= Grade II* listed buildings in Babergh =

There are over 20,000 Grade II* listed buildings in England. This page is a list of these buildings in the district of Babergh in Suffolk.

== List of buildings ==
Name	Location	Type	Completed (Note: The date given is the date used by Historic England as significant for the initial building or that of an important part in the structure's description.)	Date designated	Grid ref. (Note: The grid reference is based on the British national grid reference system, sometimes known as OSGB36, used by the Ordnance Survey.) Geo-coordinates	Entry number (Note: The "List Entry Number" is a unique number assigned to each listed building and scheduled monument by Historic England.)	Image
Mill House	Alpheton	House	15th century	10 January 1953	TL8785349205; 52°06′33″N 0°44′31″E	1285943	Upload Photo
Erwarton Hall	Erwarton	House	c.1575	23 February 1989	TM2229735122; 51°58′12″N 1°14′05″E	1351638	Erwarton Hall More images
Belstead Hall	Belstead	House	17th century	22 February 1955	TM1273041246; 52°01′44″N 1°05′59″E	1351648	Belstead Hall More images
Church of St Mary	Belstead	Church	14th century	22 February 1955	TM1265941098; 52°01′39″N 1°05′54″E	1194048	Church of St Mary More images
Bentley Hall	Bentley	House	18th century	22 February 1955	TM1187038395; 52°00′13″N 1°05′07″E	1351964	Upload Photo
Meeting Hall/Stables, approximately 30 metres south of Bentley Hall	Bentley	Jettied house	15th/16th century	22 February 1955	TM1187738372; 52°00′12″N 1°05′07″E	1033423	Upload Photo
Church of St Mary	Bentley	Church	12th century nave	22 February 1955	TM1186038142; 52°00′05″N 1°05′06″E	1193823	Church of St Mary More images
Bentley Old Hall	Bentley	House	13th/14th century	30 October 1990	TM1187139700; 52°00′55″N 1°05′10″E	1193864	Upload Photo
Newbury Farmhouse	Bildeston	House	15th–16th century	23 January 1958	TL9939949075; 52°06′15″N 0°54′36″E	1037409	Newbury Farmhouse More images
Bec Cottage, 15 Chapel Street	Bildeston	House	Medieval	23 January 1958	TL9921649421; 52°06′26″N 0°54′28″E	1351383	Bec Cottage, 15 Chapel Street More images
23–33 Chapel Street	Bildeston	House	15th–16th century	23 January 1958	TL9918149403; 52°06′25″N 0°54′26″E	1193239	23–33 Chapel Street More images
Spinners Cottage and Weavers Cottage, 35 and 37 Chapel Street	Bildeston	House	15th–16th century	23 January 1958	TL9917249398; 52°06′25″N 0°54′25″E	1037448	Spinners Cottage and Weavers Cottage, 35 and 37 Chapel Street More images
The Crown Inn	Bildeston	Jettied house	1495	23 January 1958	TL9931049430; 52°06′26″N 0°54′32″E	1286228	The Crown Inn More images
The Fleece Hotel	Boxford	House	18th century	23 January 1958	TL9629040564; 52°01′43″N 0°51′36″E	1037389	The Fleece Hotel More images
Boxted Hall	Boxted	House	16th century	10 January 1953	TL8276850570; 52°07′24″N 0°40′06″E	1351740	Boxted Hall More images
Fishers	Boxted	Hall house	15th century	10 January 1953	TL8076050394; 52°07′20″N 0°38′20″E	1036708	Upload Photo
Church of St Michael the Archangel	Brantham	Church	14th century	22 February 1955	TM1121634195; 51°57′58″N 1°04′24″E	1033431	Church of St Michael the Archangel More images
Corner Farmhouse	Brent Eleigh	Jettied house	16th century	23 January 1958	TL9424147879; 52°05′43″N 0°50′03″E	1285914	Corner Farmhouse More images
Wall and gateway southwest of Wells Hall	Brent Eleigh	Gate	16th century	23 January 1958	TL9457147304; 52°05′24″N 0°50′19″E	1037386	Wall and gateway southwest of Wells Hall More images
Old Buckenham Hall School	Brettenham Park, Brettenham	Country house	16th century	23 January 1958	TL9571652965; 52°08′25″N 0°51′31″E	1037349	Old Buckenham Hall School More images
Poplars Farmhouse	Brettenham	House	15th century and later	23 January 1958	TL9527052710; 52°08′17″N 0°51′07″E	1351456	Poplars Farmhouse More images
Great Bevills	Bures St. Mary	House	c.1490	10 January 1953	TL9070934684; 51°58′40″N 0°46′31″E	1036684	Upload Photo
Malthouse and premises occupied by W A Church (Bures) Ltd	Bures St. Mary	House	16th–17th century	10 January 1953	TL9078534135; 51°58′23″N 0°46′34″E	1036677	Malthouse and premises occupied by W A Church (Bures) Ltd More images
Sawyer's Farmhouse	Little Cornard, Bures St. Mary	House	16th century	9 February 1978	TL9068737192; 52°00′01″N 0°46′35″E	1036687	Upload Photo
Smallbridge Hall	Bures St. Mary	Country house	c.1550	10 January 1953	TL9293933065; 51°57′45″N 0°48′25″E	1194489	Smallbridge Hall More images
The Old Bakery	Bures St. Mary	Jettied house	16th century	10 January 1973	TL9075934171; 51°58′24″N 0°46′33″E	1351766	The Old Bakery More images
Boynton Hall	Capel St. Mary	House	16th century	16 March 1972	TM0917037231; 51°59′39″N 1°02′43″E	1033394	Boynton Hall More images
Church of St Mary	Capel St. Mary	Church	13th/14th century	22 February 1955	TM0858338242; 52°00′12″N 1°02′15″E	1285712	Church of St Mary More images
Church of All Saints	Chattisham	Church	Early 14th century	22 February 1955	TM0922642150; 52°02′18″N 1°02′57″E	1351620	Church of All Saints More images
Princhetts	Chelsworth	House	Probably 16th–17th century	23 January 1958	TL9827148058; 52°05′43″N 0°53′35″E	1037362	Princhetts More images
The Grange	Chelsworth	House	17th century	10 July 1980	TL9807247982; 52°05′41″N 0°53′24″E	1037325	The Grange More images
The Old Forge	Chelsworth	Jettied house	15th–16th century	23 January 1958	TL9832548085; 52°05′44″N 0°53′38″E	1351422	The Old Forge More images
Chilton Hall	Chilton	House	Late 15th century	10 January 1953	TL8904342716; 52°03′02″N 0°45′20″E	1036689	Chilton Hall More images
Church House	Cockfield	Cruck house	Medieval	23 January 1958	TL9037954944; 52°09′36″N 0°46′55″E	1194237	Church House More images
Church of St Mary	Washbrook, Copdock and Washbrook	Church	12th century	22 February 1955	TM1095342589; 52°02′30″N 1°04′28″E	1194408	Church of St Mary More images
Church of St Peter	Copdock, Copdock and Washbrook	Church	14th and 15th century	22 February 1955	TM1202641531; 52°01′54″N 1°05′22″E	1194324	Church of St Peter More images
Bellcage to north side of churchyard	East Bergholt	Bell tower	Late 16th century	22 February 1955	TM0704134484; 51°58′13″N 1°00′46″E	1033451	Bellcage to north side of churchyard More images
Bridge Cottage	Flatford, East Bergholt	House	Late 16th century	22 February 1955	TM0758233336; 51°57′35″N 1°01′12″E	1033472	Bridge Cottage More images
Chaplins	Gaston End, East Bergholt	House	Early 16th century	22 February 1955	TM0743635367; 51°58′41″N 1°01′08″E	1286166	Upload Photo
Churchgate House	Rectory Hill, East Bergholt	House	c.1500	22 February 1955	TM0708634463; 51°58′12″N 1°00′48″E	1033454	Churchgate House More images
Claycotts	Flatford Road, East Bergholt	House	Early 16th century	22 February 1955	TM0776534226; 51°58′04″N 1°01′23″E	1351932	Upload Photo
The Gables	The Street, East Bergholt	House	Late 16th century	22 February 1955	TM0695834733; 51°58′21″N 1°00′42″E	1285872	Upload Photo
The Lodge	Hadleigh Rd, East Bergholt	House	18th century	22 February 1955	TM0648735428; 51°58′44″N 1°00′19″E	1286124	Upload Photo
Church of St Peter	Freston	Church	13th–14th century	22 February 1955	TM1709639511; 52°00′42″N 1°09′43″E	1036973	Church of St Peter More images
Freston Tower	Freston Park, Freston	Watchtower	c.1550	22 February 1955	TM1779239664; 52°00′46″N 1°10′20″E	1203980	Freston Tower More images
Angel House	Glemsford	Jettied house	16th century	23 March 1961	TL8287647515; 52°05′45″N 0°40′06″E	1036656	Angel House More images
Monks Hall	Low St, Glemsford	House	15th century	23 March 1961	TL8342048820; 52°06′26″N 0°40′37″E	1285414	Monks Hall More images
Peverells	21–25, Tye Green, Glemsford	Hall house	15th–16th century	10 January 1953	TL8262348025; 52°06′01″N 0°39′54″E	1036665	Peverells More images
13–17, Chequers Lane	Glemsford	Jettied house	16th and 17th century	23 March 1961	TL8298448806; 52°06′26″N 0°40′14″E	1036649	13–17, Chequers Lane More images
Poplars Farmhouse	Great Cornard	House	15th century	10 January 1953	TL9030741094; 52°02′08″N 0°46′23″E	1036630	Upload Photo
Babergh Hall	Great Waldingfield	House	Late 18th–early 19th century	10 January 1953	TL9031444498; 52°03′58″N 0°46′30″E	1036634	Babergh Hall More images
Groton Hall	Groton	House	18th century	23 January 1958	TL9597741658; 52°02′19″N 0°51′21″E	1285612	Groton Hall More images
Bank House and the White Lion Hotel	42 & 44, High St, Hadleigh	House	18th century	26 April 1950	TM0271642428; 52°02′35″N 0°57′16″E	1036802	Bank House and the White Lion Hotel More images
Barclays Bank	Hadleigh	Loggia	Early 19th century	26 April 1950	TM0272542421; 52°02′35″N 0°57′17″E	1351707	Barclays Bank More images
Benton End House	Raydon Rd, Hadleigh	House	18th century	26 April 1950	TM0334341357; 52°02′00″N 0°57′47″E	1194592	Benton End House More images
Deanery	Church Walk, Hadleigh	Deanery	1831	22 May 1972	TM0249442470; 52°02′37″N 0°57′05″E	1194061	Deanery More images
East House	George St, Hadleigh	House	18th century	26 April 1950	TM0287742615; 52°02′41″N 0°57′25″E	1036786	Upload Photo
Sun Court	12–16, Bridge St, Hadleigh	Timber-framed house	16th century	26 April 1950	TM0233042967; 52°02′53″N 0°56′57″E	1193958	Upload Photo
Sun Court	107, High St, Hadleigh	House	Early 16th century	26 April 1950	TM0252142695; 52°02′44″N 0°57′07″E	1036746	Sun Court More images
The Manse	90, Benson St, Hadleigh	House	18th century	26 April 1950	TM0294541860; 52°02′17″N 0°57′27″E	1351708	Upload Photo
Toppesfield Bridge	Hadleigh	Bridge	14th century	26 April 1950	TM0257442147; 52°02′27″N 0°57′08″E	1036780	Toppesfield Bridge More images
White Hart Inn	Hadleigh	Inn	15th/16th century	26 April 1950	TM0222843055; 52°02′56″N 0°56′52″E	1193977	White Hart Inn More images
95, 97 and 99 Angel Street	Hadleigh	House	16th century	26 April 1950	TM0289242860; 52°02′49″N 0°57′26″E	1193765	Upload Photo
13 Bridge Street	Hadleigh	Timber-framed house	17th century	26 April 1950	TM0239642836; 52°02′49″N 0°57′00″E	1036811	13 Bridge Street More images
15 Bridge Street	Hadleigh	Timber-framed house	18th century	26 April 1950	TM0238842839; 52°02′49″N 0°57′00″E	1036812	15 Bridge Street More images
21 Bridge Street	Hadleigh	House	18th century	26 April 1950	TM0229442950; 52°02′53″N 0°56′55″E	1193934	21 Bridge Street
77–81 Benton Street	Hadleigh	House	18th century	26 April 1950	TM0293941936; 52°02′19″N 0°57′27″E	1193819	Upload Photo
92 and 94 Benton Street	Hadleigh	Inn	16th century	26 April 1950	TM0299341820; 52°02′15″N 0°57′30″E	1036804	92 and 94 Benton Street More images
45 and 47 High Street	Hadleigh	Hall house	Late 18th century	26 April 1950	TM0268442443; 52°02′36″N 0°57′15″E	1036779	45 and 47 High Street More images
46 and 48 High Street	Hadleigh	Shop	17th century	26 April 1950	TM0270542444; 52°02′36″N 0°57′16″E	1036757	46 and 48 High Street More images
49 High Street	Hadleigh	Timber-framed house	1774	26 April 1950	TM0267942450; 52°02′36″N 0°57′14″E	1036735	49 High Street More images
79–83 High Street	Hadleigh	Hall house	15th century	26 April 1950	TM0258442575; 52°02′40″N 0°57′10″E	1036740	79–83 High Street More images
91 and 93 High Street	Hadleigh	Timber-framed house	17th century	26 April 1950	TM0256342623; 52°02′42″N 0°57′09″E	1194454	Upload Photo
97 and 99 High Street	Hadleigh	House	17th century	26 April 1950	TM0255042649; 52°02′43″N 0°57′08″E	1036744	97 and 99 High Street More images
124 and 126 High Street (formerly Shoulder of Mutton)	Hadleigh	House	16th century	26 April 1950	TM0252342800; 52°02′48″N 0°57′07″E	1194322	124 and 126 High Street (formerly Shoulder of Mutton) More images
108 and 110 High Street	Hadleigh	House	1649	26 April 1950	TM0255142732; 52°02′45″N 0°57′08″E	1194306	108 and 110 High Street More images
22–26 George Street	Hadleigh	Timber-framed house	15th–16th century	26 April 1950	TM0283242582; 52°02′40″N 0°57′23″E	1351701	Upload Photo
28 George Street	Hadleigh	House	17th–18th century	26 April 1950	TM0284042579; 52°02′40″N 0°57′23″E	1036785	Upload Photo
48 George Street	Hadleigh	Cross-wing house	14th/15th century	26 April 1950	TM0303742686; 52°02′43″N 0°57′34″E	1036788	Upload Photo
Church of St Mary	Harkstead	Church	12th century	22 February 1955	TM1940835280; 51°58′22″N 1°11′35″E	1286085	Church of St Mary More images
Church of St Mary	Higham	Church	13th century	22 February 1955	TM0356335232; 51°58′42″N 0°57′45″E	1351625	Church of St Mary More images
Service ranges, stables, former coachhouse and brewhouse attached to Hintlesham Hall	Hintlesham	Brewhouse	18th century	22 February 1955	TM0828243846; 52°03′14″N 1°02′11″E	1036918	Upload Photo
Royal Hospital School, main range including assembly hall, dining room, gymnasium, administration and teaching accommodation	Holbrook	Hospital school	c.1925–33	16 January 1981	TM1654335227; 51°58′24″N 1°09′05″E	1036871	Royal Hospital School, main range including assembly hall, dining room, gymnasium, administration and teaching accommodation More images
Chapel of the Royal Hospital School	Holbrook	Chapel	c.1925–33	23 February 1989	TM1672635223; 51°58′23″N 1°09′14″E	1036873	Chapel of the Royal Hospital School More images
Church of All Saints	Holbrook	Church	14th century	22 February 1955	TM1704036128; 51°58′52″N 1°09′33″E	1193727	Church of All Saints More images
Church of St Mary	Holton St. Mary	Church	13th century	22 February 1955	TM0592736787; 51°59′29″N 0°59′52″E	1351596	Church of St Mary More images
Ailsa Cottage & Greenan	Kersey	Cross-wing house	15th–16th century	23 January 1958	TM0005144050; 52°03′31″N 0°55′00″E	1037237	Ailsa Cottage & Greenan More images
Corner House	Kersey	House	15th–16th century	23 January 1958	TM0000144277; 52°03′39″N 0°54′58″E	1180414	Upload Photo
Cressland & Kedges End	Kersey	House	17th century	23 January 1958	TM0002444133; 52°03′34″N 0°54′59″E	1037247	Upload Photo
Kersey Mill	Kersey	Mill	18th–19th century	23 January 1958	TM0117444417; 52°03′42″N 0°56′00″E	1180340	Kersey Mill More images
Mill House	Kersey	Mill house	17th century	23 January 1958	TM0003544208; 52°03′36″N 0°55′00″E	1351458	Upload Photo
River House	Kersey	House	16th century	23 January 1958	TM0007244114; 52°03′33″N 0°55′01″E	1234780	River House More images
The Little Manor	Kersey	Cross-wing house	14th–15th century	23 January 1958	TM0014143987; 52°03′29″N 0°55′05″E	1351461	The Little Manor More images
1 & 2 The Street	Kersey	Jettied house	16th–17th century	23 January 1958	TM0000444180; 52°03′36″N 0°54′58″E	1351485	Upload Photo
3 & 4 The Street	Kersey	Jettied house	16th century	23 January 1958	TL9999944188; 52°03′36″N 0°54′58″E	1285468	Upload Photo
5 & 6, The Street	Kersey	Jettied house	15th–16th century	23 January 1958	TL9999844202; 52°03′36″N 0°54′58″E	1037249	Upload Photo
Angel Hotel	Lavenham	Hotel	18th century	23 January 1958	TL9161549357; 52°06′34″N 0°47′48″E	1037184	Angel Hotel More images
Little Hall	Lavenham	Cross-wing house	15th century	23 January 1958	TL9163749327; 52°06′33″N 0°47′49″E	1351533	Little Hall More images
Swan Hotel (that part formerly listed as No 102)	Lavenham	House/hotel	15th–16th century	23 January 1958	TL9153949186; 52°06′28″N 0°47′44″E	1037174	Swan Hotel (that part formerly listed as No 102) More images
Swan Hotel (that part formerly listed as Swan Inn)	Lavenham	House	16th century	23 January 1958	TL9155449185; 52°06′28″N 0°47′45″E	1037175	Swan Hotel (that part formerly listed as Swan Inn) More images
Swan Hotel (that part formerly listed as No 101)	Lavenham	House	Probably 16th century	23 January 1958	TL9153649201; 52°06′29″N 0°47′44″E	1351529	Swan Hotel (that part formerly listed as No 101) More images
The Barn	Lavenham	Barn	15th–16th century	23 January 1958	TL9169249244; 52°06′30″N 0°47′52″E	1037216	The Barn More images
The Great House	Lavenham	House	18th century	23 January 1958	TL9163049344; 52°06′33″N 0°47′49″E	1181062	The Great House More images
The Manor House	Lavenham	House	15th century	23 January 1958	TL9171849107; 52°06′25″N 0°47′53″E	1037129	The Manor House More images
Woolstaplers	Lavenham	House	Early 15th (or possibly 14th) century	23 January 1958	TL9175649454; 52°06′37″N 0°47′56″E	1037190	Woolstaplers More images
58 Water Street	Lavenham	Jettied house	1425	23 January 1958	TL9169149113; 52°06′26″N 0°47′52″E	1037130	58 Water Street More images
No 9, Church St, including outbuilding adjoining on the north, and no 10	Lavenham	House	15th century	23 January 1958	TL9153749076; 52°06′25″N 0°47′44″E	1037228	No 9, Church St, including outbuilding adjoining on the north, and no 10
Blaize House, 11 and 12 Church Street	Lavenham	Clothier's house	15th–16th century	23 January 1958	TL9152649062; 52°06′24″N 0°47′43″E	1180575	Blaize House, 11 and 12 Church Street More images
13–15 Church Street	Lavenham	Clothier's house	15th–16th century	23 January 1958	TL9152049054; 52°06′24″N 0°47′43″E	1351478	13–15 Church Street More images
81 Church Street	Lavenham	House	c.1750	23 January 1958	TL9146849054; 52°06′24″N 0°47′40″E	1351480	81 Church Street More images
85 Church Street	Lavenham	Jettied house	16th century	23 January 1958	TL9150349073; 52°06′25″N 0°47′42″E	1180676	85 Church Street More images
86 Church Street	Lavenham	Jettied house	16th century	23 January 1958	TL9150649080; 52°06′25″N 0°47′42″E	1037192	86 Church Street More images
87 Church Street	Lavenham	Jettied house	15th–16th century	23 January 1958	TL9150849087; 52°06′25″N 0°47′42″E	1351499	87 Church Street More images
88 & 89 Church Street	Lavenham	Jettied house	15th–16th century	23 January 1958	TL9151049092; 52°06′25″N 0°47′42″E	1037193	88 & 89 Church Street More images
90 Church Street	Lavenham	Jettied house	15th–16th century	23 January 1958	TL9151449102; 52°06′25″N 0°47′43″E	1037194	90 Church Street More images
91 Church Street	Lavenham	House	16th century	23 January 1958	TL9151649119; 52°06′26″N 0°47′43″E	1351500	91 Church Street More images
The Willows (92 Church Street)	Lavenham	House	c.1750	23 January 1958	TL9151449146; 52°06′27″N 0°47′43″E	1037195	The Willows (92 Church Street) More images
10–13 High Street	Lavenham	House	18th or early 19th century	23 January 1958	TL9150449271; 52°06′31″N 0°47′42″E	1285335	10–13 High Street More images
97 High Street	Lavenham	House	15th–16th century	23 January 1958	TL9153149228; 52°06′30″N 0°47′44″E	1351528	97 High Street More images
98–100 High Street	Lavenham	Cross-wing house	Early 15th century	23 January 1958	TL9153449215; 52°06′29″N 0°47′44″E	1037173	98–100 High Street More images
The Grove	Lavenham	House	15th–16th century	23 January 1958	TL9160949225; 52°06′29″N 0°47′48″E	1351531	The Grove More images
Lawshall Hall	Lawshall	House	Mid-16th century	10 January 1953	TL8633354290; 52°09′20″N 0°43′21″E	1036593	Lawshall Hall More images
Honey Hall	Honey Tye, Leavenheath	Hall house	15th century	10 January 1953	TL9559535644; 51°59′05″N 0°50′49″E	1036600	Honey Hall More images
Bourchier Galleries, House and Shop	Long Melford	House	Late 17th century	23 March 1961	TL8624745487; 52°04′35″N 0°42′59″E	1033698	Bourchier Galleries, House and Shop More images
Bridge Street Farmhouse	Bridge Street, Long Melford	House	Medieval	10 January 1953	TL8715348463; 52°06′10″N 0°43′52″E	1036574	Bridge Street Farmhouse More images
Brook House	Long Melford	House	16th and 17th century	10 January 1953	TL8642945909; 52°04′49″N 0°43′09″E	1183049	Brook House More images
Bull Hotel	Long Melford	Hotel	1580 or earlier	9 February 1978	TL8648745878; 52°04′47″N 0°43′12″E	1182781	Bull Hotel More images
Chapel at Melford Place	Long Melford	House	14th century	10 January 1953	TL8619644966; 52°04′18″N 0°42′55″E	1183356	Chapel at Melford Place More images
Dovecote to the southwest of Kentwell Hall	Kentwell, Long Melford	Dovecote	18th century	9 February 1978	TL8630447882; 52°05′52″N 0°43′07″E	1351844	Dovecote to the southwest of Kentwell Hall More images
Garden walls to Melford Hall	Long Melford	Garden wall	c.1559	9 February 1978	TL8657646198; 52°04′58″N 0°43′18″E	1351818	Garden walls to Melford Hall More images
Gateway and lodges to Melford Hall	Long Melford	Gate lodge	c.1559	16 April 1971	TL8658646294; 52°05′01″N 0°43′18″E	1033703	Gateway and lodges to Melford Hall More images
Summerhouse at Melford Hall	Long Melford	Summerhouse	16th century	10 January 1953	TL8659046257; 52°05′00″N 0°43′18″E	1351819	Summerhouse at Melford Hall More images
Premises occupied by Cadge and Son, Builders	Long Melford	Hall house	Medieval	10 January 1953	TL8627245180; 52°04′25″N 0°43′00″E	1351864	Premises occupied by Cadge and Son, Builders More images
The Elms	Long Melford	House	18th century	10 January 1953	TL8627545305; 52°04′29″N 0°43′00″E	1033641	The Elms More images
Water conduit	Long Melford	Conduit	16th century	10 January 1953	TL8659746427; 52°05′05″N 0°43′19″E	1033704	Water conduit More images
Milden Hall	Milden	Timber-framed house	18th century	23 January 1958	TL9443046274; 52°04′50″N 0°50′10″E	1181918	Upload Photo
The Fenn	Swingleton Green, Monks Eleigh	House	16th century	23 January 1958	TL9619247312; 52°05′22″N 0°51′44″E	1182166	The Fenn More images
Dresden Cottage	Nayland-with-Wissington	House	15th century	9 February 1978	TL9748534427; 51°58′24″N 0°52′26″E	1351862	Upload Photo
Odd Corners	Nayland-with-Wissington	Jettied house	16th century	10 January 1953	TL9748934404; 51°58′23″N 0°52′26″E	1033592	Upload Photo
Wiston Mill	Wiston, Nayland-with-Wissington	House	18th–19th century	9 February 1978	TL9623333282; 51°57′48″N 0°51′18″E	1033616	Wiston Mill More images
1 Birch Street	Nayland, Nayland-with-Wissington	House	16th century	10 January 1953	TL9748634392; 51°58′22″N 0°52′25″E	1033591	Upload Photo
6 and 8 Birch Street	Nayland, Nayland-with-Wissington	House	15th century	9 February 1978	TL9748034421; 51°58′23″N 0°52′25″E	1033633	Upload Photo
17 and 19 Court Street	Nayland, Nayland-with-Wissington	Timber-framed building	14th century	9 February 1978	TL9745434152; 51°58′15″N 0°52′23″E	1351850	Upload Photo
1 and 3 High Street	Nayland, Nayland-with-Wissington	House	15th century	10 January 1953	TL9748434310; 51°58′20″N 0°52′25″E	1033572	Upload Photo
Brickhouse Farmhouse	Naughton, Nedging-with-Naughton	Farmhouse	15th–16th century	10 July 1980	TM0289248998; 52°06′08″N 0°57′40″E	1037104	Upload Photo
Church of All Saints	Newton	Church	Mainly 14th century	23 March 1961	TL9197141267; 52°02′12″N 0°47′51″E	1283418	Church of All Saints More images
Rogers Farmhouse	Newton	Jettied house	c.1600	9 February 1978	TL9314241404; 52°02′15″N 0°48′52″E	1033552	Rogers Farmhouse More images
Polstead Hall	Polstead Park, Polstead, Babergh	House	16th century	23 January 1958	TL9881638157; 52°00′22″N 0°53′43″E	1037049	Polstead Hall More images
Preston Hall	Preston St. Mary	House	16th–17th century	23 January 1958	TL9465150231; 52°06′58″N 0°50′30″E	1182472	Preston Hall More images
Church of St Mary	Raydon	Church	Late 13th–early 14th century	22 February 1955	TM0493138620; 52°00′29″N 0°59′04″E	1286247	Church of St Mary More images
Church of All Saints	Shelley	Church	Early 14th century	22 February 1955	TM0308238457; 52°00′27″N 0°57′27″E	1351959	Church of All Saints More images
Church of St Mary	Shotley	Church	13th/14th century	22 February 1955	TM2370136021; 51°58′39″N 1°15′21″E	1194504	Church of St Mary More images
Church of All Saints	Sproughton	Church	Early 14th century	22 February 1955	TM1251545029; 52°03′46″N 1°05′56″E	1285956	Church of All Saints More images
Church of St James	Stanstead	Church	14th century	23 March 1961	TL8433949342; 52°06′42″N 0°41′26″E	1033528	Church of St James More images
The Oaklands	Stanstead	House	16th–17th century	10 January 1953	TL8435148590; 52°06′18″N 0°41′25″E	1033523	The Oaklands More images
Street House	Stoke-by-Nayland	Jettied house	15th–16th century	10 January 1953	TL9879636286; 51°59′22″N 0°53′38″E	1033538	Upload Photo
The Downs Farmhouse	Stoke-by-Nayland	Farmhouse	Early 16th century	9 February 1978	TL9863436054; 51°59′15″N 0°53′29″E	1200113	Upload Photo
The Maltings	Stoke-by-Nayland	House	16th century and later	23 March 1961	TL9856836306; 51°59′23″N 0°53′26″E	1033513	The Maltings More images
The Old Guildhall (Tudor Cottages)	Stoke-by-Nayland	House	16th and 17th century	10 January 1953	TL9856536258; 51°59′21″N 0°53′26″E	1200348	The Old Guildhall (Tudor Cottages) More images
Thorington Hall	Stoke-by-Nayland	Jettied house	17th century	10 January 1953	TM0131235465; 51°58′52″N 0°55′48″E	1200597	Thorington Hall More images
Lowe Hill House	Stratford St. Mary	House	Early 16th century	22 February 1955	TM0425135021; 51°58′34″N 0°58′21″E	1036991	Lowe Hill House More images
Weavers House	Stratford St. Mary	House	Early–mid-16th century	22 February 1955	TM0426033820; 51°57′55″N 0°58′19″E	1351601	Weavers House More images
Church of St Peter	Stutton	Church	15th century	22 February 1955	TM1615434462; 51°58′00″N 1°08′43″E	1285520	Church of St Peter More images
Crowe Hall	Stutton	House	c.1605	22 February 1956	TM1528034214; 51°57′53″N 1°07′56″E	1036862	Upload Photo
Garden wall and gateway attached to and enclosing a garden to north of Stutton Hall	Stutton Park, Stutton	Gate	16th century	23 February 1989	TM1403433746; 51°57′40″N 1°06′50″E	1180369	Upload Photo
Stutton Hall	Stutton Park, Stutton	House	c.1553	22 February 1955	TM1403233702; 51°57′38″N 1°06′50″E	1036866	Stutton Hall More images
30 Market Hill	Sudbury	House	18th century	3 March 1952	TL8737541274; 52°02′18″N 0°43′50″E	1351389	30 Market Hill More images
Ballingdon Hall	Sudbury	Timber-framed house	c.1593	3 March 1952	TL8626740189; 52°01′44″N 0°42′50″E	1037550	Upload Photo
Brundon Hall	Brundon, Sudbury	House	18th century	3 March 1952	TL8657242180; 52°02′48″N 0°43′09″E	1037518	Brundon Hall More images
Chapel at St Bartholomew's Priory Farm	Sudbury	Chapel	Early 15th century	3 March 1952	TL8709942803; 52°03′07″N 0°43′38″E	1037546	Chapel at St Bartholomew's Priory Farm More images
Corn Exchange & Public Library	Sudbury	Corn exchange	1841	26 October 1971	TL8735241252; 52°02′17″N 0°43′49″E	1037457	Corn Exchange & Public Library More images
Priory Gate	Sudbury	House	c.1500	3 March 1952	TL8706241036; 52°02′10″N 0°43′33″E	1285460	Priory Gate More images
Stour Hall	Sudbury	House	17th century	3 March 1952	TL8697841250; 52°02′17″N 0°43′29″E	1037437	Stour Hall More images
The Red House	Bullocks Lane, Sudbury	House	17th/18th century	3 March 1952	TL8781841412; 52°02′21″N 0°44′13″E	1351342	Upload Photo
Ye Old Moot Hall	Sudbury	House	15th century	3 March 1952	TL8682641046; 52°02′11″N 0°43′21″E	1180344	Ye Old Moot Hall More images
Church of St Mary	Tattingstone	Church	14th century	22 May 1955	TM1360437143; 51°59′30″N 1°06′35″E	1351983	Church of St Mary More images
The Tattingstone Wonder	Tattingstone	House	c.1790	22 February 1955	TM1391436285; 51°59′02″N 1°06′49″E	1033392	The Tattingstone Wonder More images
Thorpe Hall	Thorpe Morieux	House	16th century	23 January 1958	TL9432053235; 52°08′36″N 0°50′18″E	1284474	Thorpe Hall More images
Church of St Nicholas	Wattisham	Church	14th century	23 January 1958	TM0098251376; 52°07′27″N 0°56′04″E	1037033	Church of St Nicholas More images
Church of St John	Wenham Magna	Church	14th century	22 February 1955	TM0709838128; 52°00′11″N 1°00′57″E	1033403	Church of St John More images
Priory Farmhouse	Wenham Magna	House	15th century or earlier	22 February 1955	TM0726038174; 52°00′12″N 1°01′05″E	1351956	Priory Farmhouse More images
Wenham Place	Wenham Magna	House	16th century	22 February 1955	TM0719537760; 51°59′59″N 1°01′01″E	1351955	Wenham Place More images
Barn approximately 150 metres north of Little Wenham Castle and west of Church of St Lawrence	Wenham Parva	Timber-framed barn	16th century	30 October 1990	TM0803539212; 52°00′44″N 1°01′48″E	1194552	Barn approximately 150 metres north of Little Wenham Castle and west of Church of St Lawrence More images
Church of St Mary	Wherstead Park, Wherstead	Church	12th century	22 February 1955	TM1614140699; 52°01′21″N 1°08′56″E	1204027	Church of St Mary More images
Church of St Michael	Woolverstone Park, Woolverstone	Church	14th century	22 February 1955	TM1902138583; 52°00′09″N 1°11′22″E	1204060	Church of St Michael More images
Woolverstone House including walls attached to each side	Woolverstone	Jettied house	1901	16 March 1972	TM1828838758; 52°00′16″N 1°10′44″E	1204044	Upload Photo

== See also ==
- Grade I listed buildings in Babergh
- Grade II* listed buildings in Forest Heath
- Grade II* listed buildings in Ipswich
- Grade II* listed buildings in Mid Suffolk
- Grade II* listed buildings in St Edmundsbury (borough)
- Grade II* listed buildings in Suffolk Coastal
- Grade II* listed buildings in Waveney
