= Listed buildings in Chelsworth =

Civil Parish in Suffolk, England

Chelsworth is a village and civil parish in the Babergh District of Suffolk, England. It contains 33 listed buildings that are recorded in the National Heritage List for England. Of these one is grade I, three are grade II* and 29 are grade II.

This list is based on the information retrieved online from Historic England.

== Key ==
Grade	Criteria
I	Buildings that are of exceptional interest
II*	Particularly important buildings of more than special interest
II	Buildings that are of special interest

== Listing ==
Name	Grade	Location	Type	Completed (Note: The date given is the date used by Historic England as significant for the initial building or that of an important part in the structure's description.)	Date designated	Grid ref. (Note: The grid reference is based on the British national grid reference system, sometimes known as OSGB36, used by the Ordnance Survey.) Geo-coordinates	Notes	Entry number (Note: The "List Entry Number" is a unique number assigned to each listed building and scheduled monument by Historic England.)	Image	Wikidata
Church of All Saints	I		church building		23 January 1958	TL9804147920; 52°05′39″N 0°53′23″E		1037358	Church of All Saints More images	Q17541975
Swifts Garden	II	Cakebridge Lane			10 July 1980	TL9758348151; 52°05′47″N 0°52′59″E		1285833	Upload Photo	Q26574494
Lower Common Farmhouse	II	Chelsworth Common			10 July 1980	TL9861247246; 52°05′16″N 0°53′51″E		1037359	Upload Photo	Q26289076
Upper Common Cottages	II	Chelsworth Common			10 July 1980	TL9869746976; 52°05′08″N 0°53′55″E		1194108	Upload Photo	Q26488738
Bridge Farmhouse	II	Hall Road			23 January 1958	TL9825647944; 52°05′40″N 0°53′34″E		1037360	Bridge Farmhouse More images	Q26289077
Bridge Over the River Brett	II	Hall Road	road bridge		23 January 1958	TL9824447981; 52°05′41″N 0°53′33″E		1351420	Bridge Over the River Brett More images	Q17641197
Stables Cottage	II	Hall Road			10 July 1980	TL9825147884; 52°05′38″N 0°53′34″E		1194110	Upload Photo	Q26488740
The Cottage	II	Parsonage Lane			10 July 1980	TL9850248110; 52°05′45″N 0°53′47″E		1351421	Upload Photo	Q26634530
Whistlecraft Cottage	II	Parsonage Lane	cottage		10 July 1980	TL9865648029; 52°05′42″N 0°53′55″E		1285834	Whistlecraft Cottage More images	Q26574495
Rush Cottage	II	Semer Road			10 July 1980	TL9825447272; 52°05′18″N 0°53′33″E		1037361	Upload Photo	Q26289078
Church Farmhouse	II	2 and 4, The Street			10 July 1980	TL9839848134; 52°05′45″N 0°53′42″E		1194117	Upload Photo	Q26488746
Chestnut Cottages	II	9 and 11, The Street			23 January 1958	TL9836448091; 52°05′44″N 0°53′40″E		1351446	Upload Photo	Q26634553
The Old Forge	II*	10 and 12, The Street	smithy		23 January 1958	TL9832548085; 52°05′44″N 0°53′38″E		1351422	The Old Forge More images	Q17534348
Middle House the Old Manor	II	16, The Street			23 January 1958	TL9828448065; 52°05′43″N 0°53′36″E		1285839	Middle House the Old Manor More images	Q26574500
Princhetts	II*	18 and 20, The Street	building		23 January 1958	TL9827148058; 52°05′43″N 0°53′35″E		1037362	Princhetts More images	Q17533468
The Peacock Inn	II	24 and 26, The Street	inn		23 January 1958	TL9822848035; 52°05′42″N 0°53′33″E		1037363	The Peacock Inn More images	Q26289079
Jackdaws Ford	II	30 and 32, The Street			23 January 1958	TL9820848027; 52°05′42″N 0°53′32″E		1194140	Jackdaws Ford More images	Q26488771
36 and 38, the Street	II	36 and 38, The Street			23 January 1958	TL9817548015; 52°05′42″N 0°53′30″E		1037364	36 and 38, the Street More images	Q26289080
Waterfall Cottage	II	40 and 42, The Street			23 January 1958	TL9815648011; 52°05′42″N 0°53′29″E		1194147	Waterfall Cottage More images	Q26488778
The Granary the White House	II	48, The Street			10 July 1980	TL9807948034; 52°05′43″N 0°53′25″E		1351424	Upload Photo	Q26634532
Ivy House	II	58, The Street	house		26 July 1977	TL9804148096; 52°05′45″N 0°53′23″E		1194156	Ivy House More images	Q26488787
Kingswood	II	62 and 64, The Street			27 November 1975	TL9795448097; 52°05′45″N 0°53′19″E		1351444	Upload Photo	Q26634551
70-72 the Street	II	70-72, The Street, Ipswich, IP7 7HU			26 July 1977	TL9790848090; 52°05′45″N 0°53′16″E		1037322	Upload Photo	Q26289036
71, the Street	II	71, The Street			26 July 1977	TL9791648062; 52°05′44″N 0°53′16″E		1351447	Upload Photo	Q26634554
Riverside Cottage	II	73, The Street			26 July 1977	TL9786648062; 52°05′44″N 0°53′14″E		1037326	Upload Photo	Q26289039
Woodstock Cottage	II	76, The Street			26 July 1977	TL9782048073; 52°05′44″N 0°53′11″E		1351445	Upload Photo	Q26634552
Meadow Cottage	II	84 and 86, The Street			26 July 1977	TL9775648065; 52°05′44″N 0°53′08″E		1037323	Upload Photo	Q26289037
Old Farm Cottages	II	91 and 93, The Street			26 July 1977	TL9768748036; 52°05′43″N 0°53′04″E		1351448	Upload Photo	Q26634555
Weavers Cottage	II	92, The Street			26 July 1977	TL9769148063; 52°05′44″N 0°53′05″E		1037324	Upload Photo	Q26289038
K6 Telephone Kiosk (opposite Brett Cottage)	II	The Street			10 June 1988	TL9825648029; 52°05′42″N 0°53′34″E		1234823	Upload Photo	Q26528202
Stable Block to the West of Number 18 and 20 (princhetts)	II	The Street			10 July 1980	TL9824048067; 52°05′44″N 0°53′33″E		1194132	Upload Photo	Q26488764
The Grange	II*	The Street	house		10 July 1980	TL9807247982; 52°05′41″N 0°53′24″E		1037325	The Grange More images	Q17533452
The Summer House	II	The Street			10 July 1980	TL9821148071; 52°05′44″N 0°53′32″E		1351423	Upload Photo	Q26634531

== See also ==
- Grade I listed buildings in Suffolk
- Grade II* listed buildings in Suffolk

== Sources ==
- Bettely, James; Pevsner, Nikolaus (2015) [1961], Suffolk: West, The Buildings of England, New Haven and London: Yale University Press, ISBN 978-0-300-19655-9
