= Shoulder of Mutton =

Shoulder of Mutton may refer to:

- Shoulder of Mutton, Hadleigh, a listed former pub in Suffolk, England
- Shoulder of Mutton, Holcombe, a listed pub in Greater Manchester, England
- Shoulder of Mutton Green, a public open space in the London Borough of Bexley
