= Listed buildings in Wenham Magna =

Civil Parish in Suffolk, England

Wenham Magna is a village and civil parish in the Babergh District of Suffolk, England. It contains eleven listed buildings that are recorded in the National Heritage List for England. Of these three grade II* and eight are grade II.

This list is based on the information retrieved online from Historic England.

== Key ==
Grade	Criteria
I	Buildings that are of exceptional interest
II*	Particularly important buildings of more than special interest
II	Buildings that are of special interest

== Listing ==
Name	Grade	Location	Type	Completed (Note: The date given is the date used by Historic England as significant for the initial building or that of an important part in the structure's description.)	Date designated	Grid ref. (Note: The grid reference is based on the British national grid reference system, sometimes known as OSGB36, used by the Ordnance Survey.) Geo-coordinates	Notes	Entry number (Note: The "List Entry Number" is a unique number assigned to each listed building and scheduled monument by Historic England.)	Image	Wikidata
Church of St John	II*	Church Road	church building		22 February 1955	TM0709838128; 52°00′11″N 1°00′57″E		1033403	Church of St John More images	Q17532642
Walled Garden Attached to North of Wenham Place	II	Church Road			30 October 1990	TM0719237785; 51°59′59″N 1°01′01″E		1285667	Upload Photo	Q26574341
Walnut Thatch	II	Church Road			30 October 1990	TM0708138049; 52°00′08″N 1°00′56″E		1033402	Upload Photo	Q26284885
Wenham Hill	II	Church Road			22 February 1955	TM0754237305; 51°59′43″N 1°01′18″E		1285661	Upload Photo	Q26574335
Wenham Place	II*	Church Road	building		22 February 1955	TM0719537760; 51°59′59″N 1°01′01″E		1351955	Wenham Place More images	Q17534689
Priory Farmhouse	II*	Off Church Road	farmhouse		22 February 1955	TM0726038174; 52°00′12″N 1°01′05″E		1351956	Priory Farmhouse More images	Q17534700
Pump Adjacent to Scullery Wall Priory Farmhouse	II	Off Church Road			30 October 1990	TM0728038181; 52°00′12″N 1°01′06″E		1285636	Upload Photo	Q26574313
The Old Rectory	II	Off Church Road	clergy house		22 February 1955	TM0715238089; 52°00′09″N 1°00′59″E		1194528	The Old Rectory More images	Q26489150
Manor Farmhouse	II	Raydon Road			30 October 1990	TM0688339181; 52°00′45″N 1°00′48″E		1194545	Upload Photo	Q26489166
Threeways	II	Raydon Road			22 February 1955	TM0708838689; 52°00′29″N 1°00′57″E		1033404	Upload Photo	Q26284886
Vauxhall	II	Vauxhall Drive			30 October 1990	TM0720840900; 52°01′40″N 1°01′08″E		1351957	Upload Photo	Q26635017

== See also ==
- Grade I listed buildings in Suffolk
- Grade II* listed buildings in Suffolk

== Sources ==
- Bettely, James; Pevsner, Nikolaus (2015) [1961], Suffolk: West, The Buildings of England, New Haven and London: Yale University Press, ISBN 978-0-300-19655-9
