= Listed buildings in Freston, Suffolk =

Historic structures in Suffolk, England

Freston is a village and civil parish in the Babergh District of Suffolk, England. It contains ten listed buildings that are recorded in the National Heritage List for England. Of these two are grade II* and eight are grade II.

This list is based on the information retrieved online from Historic England.

== Key ==
Grade	Criteria
I	Buildings that are of exceptional interest
II*	Particularly important buildings of more than special interest
II	Buildings that are of special interest

== Listing ==
Name	Grade	Location	Type	Completed (Note: The date given is the date used by Historic England as significant for the initial building or that of an important part in the structure's description.)	Date designated	Grid ref. (Note: The grid reference is based on the British national grid reference system, sometimes known as OSGB36, used by the Ordnance Survey.) Geo-coordinates	Notes	Entry number (Note: The "List Entry Number" is a unique number assigned to each listed building and scheduled monument by Historic England.)	Image	Wikidata
Turkey Farmhouse	II	B1080			29 July 1987	TM1699038137; 51°59′57″N 1°09′35″E		1203958	Upload Photo	Q26499456
Church of St Peter	II*	Church Lane	church building		22 February 1955	TM1709639511; 52°00′42″N 1°09′43″E		1036973	Church of St Peter More images	Q17533203
Freston Lodge	II	Church Lane			29 July 1987	TM1682639437; 52°00′40″N 1°09′29″E		1203963	Upload Photo	Q26499462
Cottage Opposite the Boot Inn	II	Freston Hill			29 July 1987	TM1741639553; 52°00′42″N 1°10′00″E		1203969	Upload Photo	Q26499468
Gateway at Monkey Lodge	II	Freston Hill			29 July 1987	TM1749739967; 52°00′56″N 1°10′05″E		1203967	Upload Photo	Q26499466
Monkey Lodge	II	Freston Hill			29 July 1987	TM1750539970; 52°00′56″N 1°10′06″E		1351631	Upload Photo	Q26634715
The Boot Inn	II	Freston Hill	inn		29 July 1987	TM1738539584; 52°00′44″N 1°09′59″E		1036974	The Boot Inn More images	Q26288651
Freston Tower	II*	Freston Park	folly		22 February 1955	TM1779639664; 52°00′46″N 1°10′20″E		1203980	Freston Tower More images	Q5503214
Freston Tower House and Cottage	II	Freston Park			29 July 1987	TM1780139614; 52°00′44″N 1°10′20″E		1036975	Upload Photo	Q26288652
Bond Hall	II	Freston Street			22 February 1955	TM1667538862; 52°00′21″N 1°09′20″E		1351632	Upload Photo	Q26634716

== See also ==
- Grade I listed buildings in Suffolk
- Grade II* listed buildings in Suffolk

== Sources ==
- Bettely, James; Pevsner, Nikolaus (2015) [1961], Suffolk: West, The Buildings of England, New Haven and London: Yale University Press, ISBN 978-0-300-19655-9
