= Listed buildings in Newton, Suffolk =

Civil Parish in Suffolk, England

Newton is a village and civil parish in the Babergh District of Suffolk, England. It contains 37 listed buildings that are recorded in the National Heritage List for England. Of these two are grade II* and 35 are grade II.

This list is based on the information retrieved online from Historic England.

== Key ==
Grade	Criteria
I	Buildings that are of exceptional interest
II*	Particularly important buildings of more than special interest
II	Buildings that are of special interest

== Listing ==
Name	Grade	Location	Type	Completed (Note: The date given is the date used by Historic England as significant for the initial building or that of an important part in the structure's description.)	Date designated	Grid ref. (Note: The grid reference is based on the British national grid reference system, sometimes known as OSGB36, used by the Ordnance Survey.) Geo-coordinates	Notes	Entry number (Note: The "List Entry Number" is a unique number assigned to each listed building and scheduled monument by Historic England.)	Image	Wikidata
Barn Range at Siam Hall	II				12 November 1996	TL9378340920; 52°01′58″N 0°49′25″E		1267838	Upload Photo	Q26558207
Thatch Cottage	II				9 February 1978	TL9125139950; 52°01′30″N 0°47′10″E		1033581	Upload Photo	Q26285064
War Memorial	II		war memorial		31 May 2001	TL9163440707; 52°01′54″N 0°47′32″E		1246135	War Memorial More images	Q26538574
Jarvis Farmhouse	II	Assington Road			9 February 1978	TL9245640293; 52°01′40″N 0°48′14″E		1199284	Upload Photo	Q26495175
Sparrows	II	Assington Road			9 February 1978	TL9238440342; 52°01′41″N 0°48′10″E		1351881	Upload Photo	Q26634944
Hurrel's Farmhouse	II	Boxford Lane			9 February 1978	TL9378640466; 52°01′43″N 0°49′24″E		1033582	Upload Photo	Q26285065
Barn Immediately to the West of Butlers	II	Church Road			9 February 1978	TL9192841349; 52°02′14″N 0°47′49″E		1199333	Upload Photo	Q26495221
Butlers	II	Church Road			9 February 1978	TL9197041350; 52°02′14″N 0°47′51″E		1033587	Upload Photo	Q26285072
Church of All Saints	II*	Church Road	church building		23 March 1961	TL9197141267; 52°02′12″N 0°47′51″E		1283418	Church of All Saints More images	Q4729506
Green View	II	Church Road			9 February 1978	TL9168640783; 52°01′56″N 0°47′35″E		1283449	Upload Photo	Q26572299
Hollyhocks	II	Church Road			9 February 1978	TL9169140792; 52°01′57″N 0°47′35″E		1033583	Upload Photo	Q26285067
Newton Hall	II	Church Road			9 February 1978	TL9192341176; 52°02′09″N 0°47′48″E		1199303	Upload Photo	Q26495194
Post Office and Cottage Adjoining	II	Church Road			9 February 1978	TL9169640809; 52°01′57″N 0°47′35″E		1033584	Upload Photo	Q26285068
Stables Immediately to the East of Newton Hall	II	Church Road			9 February 1978	TL9194641169; 52°02′08″N 0°47′49″E		1033585	Upload Photo	Q26285069
Wall to the South of Newton Hall	II	Church Road			9 February 1978	TL9190741146; 52°02′08″N 0°47′47″E		1033586	Upload Photo	Q26285071
Poppy Cottage and 1 Long Gardens and Marks Cottage	II	Plampin Close, CO10 0RD			9 February 1978	TL9170440731; 52°01′55″N 0°47′36″E		1033544	Upload Photo	Q26285027
Burchetts	II	Rectory Lane			9 February 1978	TL9176240284; 52°01′40″N 0°47′38″E		1033550	Upload Photo	Q26285034
Gouldings Farmhouse	II	Rectory Lane			9 February 1978	TL9175139414; 52°01′12″N 0°47′35″E		1351904	Upload Photo	Q26634967
Little Gables	II	Rectory Lane			9 February 1978	TL9176440206; 52°01′38″N 0°47′38″E		1351903	Upload Photo	Q26634966
The Old Rectory	II	Rectory Lane			9 February 1978	TL9181739853; 52°01′26″N 0°47′40″E		1033551	Upload Photo	Q26285035
Watkinsons	II	Rectory Lane			9 February 1978	TL9179039484; 52°01′14″N 0°47′38″E		1199435	Upload Photo	Q26495320
Goulding's Farm Barn	II	Rectory Road			18 July 2011	TL9172639387; 52°01′11″N 0°47′34″E		1401175	Upload Photo	Q26675466
Rogers Farmhouse	II*	Rogers Lane	farmhouse		9 February 1978	TL9314241404; 52°02′15″N 0°48′52″E		1033552	Rogers Farmhouse More images	Q17532744
Sackers Green	II	Sackers Green			9 February 1978	TL9103339862; 52°01′27″N 0°46′59″E		1351784	Upload Photo	Q26634854
Gothic House	II	Sudbury Road			9 February 1978	TL9146040877; 52°02′00″N 0°47′23″E		1033553	Upload Photo	Q26285036
Hills Farmhouse	II	Sudbury Road			9 February 1978	TL9131441072; 52°02′06″N 0°47′16″E		1351905	Upload Photo	Q26634968
Tudor Cottage	II	Sudbury Road			9 February 1978	TL9149640882; 52°02′00″N 0°47′25″E		1199471	Upload Photo	Q26495352
Brooks Farmhouse	II	The Green			9 February 1978	TL9195240560; 52°01′49″N 0°47′48″E		1033546	Upload Photo	Q26285029
Crojons	II	The Green			9 February 1978	TL9204440502; 52°01′47″N 0°47′53″E		1033548	Upload Photo	Q26285032
Newton Green Stores and House Adjoining	II	The Green			9 February 1978	TL9167740728; 52°01′55″N 0°47′34″E		1033543	Upload Photo	Q26285026
Potash	II	The Green			9 February 1978	TL9142340572; 52°01′50″N 0°47′21″E		1033549	Upload Photo	Q26285033
Saracen's Head Inn	II	The Green	inn		9 February 1978	TL9154140785; 52°01′57″N 0°47′27″E		1033588	Saracen's Head Inn More images	Q26285074
Stow	II	The Green			9 February 1978	TL9201840490; 52°01′46″N 0°47′52″E		1033547	Upload Photo	Q26285030
The Deans	II	The Green			10 January 1953	TL9188440606; 52°01′50″N 0°47′45″E		1033545	Upload Photo	Q26285028
The Hatch	II	The Green			10 January 1953	TL9203240506; 52°01′47″N 0°47′52″E		1351902	Upload Photo	Q26634965
The Row	II	1-5, The Green			9 February 1978	TL9163140758; 52°01′56″N 0°47′32″E		1033589	Upload Photo	Q26285075
Valley Farmhouse	II	Valley Road			9 February 1978	TL9073441535; 52°02′22″N 0°46′46″E		1283344	Upload Photo	Q26572210

== See also ==
- Grade I listed buildings in Suffolk
- Grade II* listed buildings in Suffolk

== Sources ==
- Bettely, James; Pevsner, Nikolaus (2015) [1961], Suffolk: West, The Buildings of England, New Haven and London: Yale University Press, ISBN 978-0-300-19655-9
