= Listed buildings in Stutton, Suffolk =

Civil Parish in Suffolk, England

Stutton is a village and civil parish in the Babergh District of Suffolk, England. It contains 30 listed buildings that are recorded in the National Heritage List for England. Of these four are grade II* and 26 are grade II.

This list is based on the information retrieved online from Historic England.

== Key ==
Grade	Criteria
I	Buildings that are of exceptional interest
II*	Particularly important buildings of more than special interest
II	Buildings that are of special interest

== Listing ==
Name	Grade	Location	Type	Completed (Note: The date given is the date used by Historic England as significant for the initial building or that of an important part in the structure's description.)	Date designated	Grid ref. (Note: The grid reference is based on the British national grid reference system, sometimes known as OSGB36, used by the Ordnance Survey.) Geo-coordinates	Notes	Entry number (Note: The "List Entry Number" is a unique number assigned to each listed building and scheduled monument by Historic England.)	Image	Wikidata
Stutton War Memorial	II	IP9 2TA			29 May 2020	TM1448334822; 51°58′14″N 1°07′16″E		1469692	Upload Photo	Q97458237
Bakers Almshouses	II	Bentley Lane			23 February 1989	TM1463635043; 51°58′21″N 1°07′24″E		1194628	Upload Photo	Q26489244
Wall Enclosing Garden and Bakers Almshouses	II	Bentley Lane			23 February 1989	TM1461435062; 51°58′21″N 1°07′23″E		1036857	Upload Photo	Q26288535
Argent Manor House	II	Bentley Road			23 February 1989	TM1452735912; 51°58′49″N 1°07′21″E		1285608	Upload Photo	Q26574287
Cartlodge/granary Approximately 50 Metres West of Argent Manor House	II	Bentley Road			23 February 1989	TM1446535928; 51°58′49″N 1°07′17″E		1036858	Upload Photo	Q26288536
Barn Approximately 70 Metres West of Crepping Hall	II	Crepping Hall Drive			22 February 1955	TM1482834008; 51°57′47″N 1°07′32″E		1036859	Upload Photo	Q26288537
Crepping Hall	II	Crepping Hall Drive			22 February 1955	TM1489934057; 51°57′48″N 1°07′36″E		1194660	Upload Photo	Q26489275
Wall Adjacent to Road, Crowe Hall with West Return to Tudor Cottage Garden and East Return of Stutton Close	II	Lower Street			23 February 1989	TM1528634617; 51°58′06″N 1°07′57″E		1194717	Upload Photo	Q26489331
Ancient House	II	Lower Street			22 February 1955	TM1519734600; 51°58′06″N 1°07′53″E		1194705	Upload Photo	Q26489318
Barn Approximately 30 Metres South (rear) of Bay Tree Farmhouse	II	Lower Street			23 February 1989	TM1518334564; 51°58′04″N 1°07′52″E		1351656	Upload Photo	Q26634738
Barn Approximately 50 Metres North of Crowe Hall Farmhouse	II	Lower Street			23 February 1989	TM1512434171; 51°57′52″N 1°07′48″E		1351657	Upload Photo	Q26634739
Barnfield	II	Lower Street			22 February 1955	TM1510634554; 51°58′04″N 1°07′48″E		1036860	Upload Photo	Q26288538
Bay Tree Farmhouse and House to Left Now Part of the Farmhouse	II	Lower Street			23 February 1989	TM1518834594; 51°58′05″N 1°07′52″E		1285588	Upload Photo	Q26574270
Crowe Hall	II*	Lower Street			22 February 1956	TM1528034214; 51°57′53″N 1°07′56″E		1036862	Upload Photo	Q17533158
Garden Wall Attached to South West Corner and Enclosing Garden to West and North of Crowe Hall with Gateway in North Face	II	Lower Street			23 February 1989	TM1528734257; 51°57′54″N 1°07′57″E		1194756	Upload Photo	Q26489368
Grove Cottage	II	Lower Street			23 February 1989	TM1539234658; 51°58′07″N 1°08′03″E		1194676	Upload Photo	Q26489291
Rose Cottage	II	Lower Street			23 February 1989	TM1530134634; 51°58′06″N 1°07′58″E		1351655	Upload Photo	Q26634737
Tudor Cottage	II	Lower Street			23 February 1989	TM1522134573; 51°58′05″N 1°07′54″E		1036861	Upload Photo	Q26288540
Chapel Cottage	II	Manningtree Road			23 February 1989	TM1436534749; 51°58′11″N 1°07′10″E		1036863	Upload Photo	Q26288541
Kings Head Inn	II	Manningtree Road	inn		22 February 1955	TM1486134891; 51°58′15″N 1°07′36″E		1036864	Kings Head Inn More images	Q26288542
Old Manor House the White House	II	Manningtree Road			22 February 1955	TM1475034841; 51°58′14″N 1°07′30″E		1351658	Upload Photo	Q26634740
Stutton Manor	II	Manningtree Road			22 February 1955	TM1427634660; 51°58′09″N 1°07′05″E		1194764	Upload Photo	Q26489377
Utopia	II	Manningtree Road			23 February 1989	TM1480334848; 51°58′14″N 1°07′33″E		1194778	Upload Photo	Q26489390
Church of St Peter	II*	Stutton Green	church building		22 February 1955	TM1615434462; 51°58′00″N 1°08′43″E		1285520	Church of St Peter More images	Q17534172
Markwells Farmhouse	II	Stutton Green			30 October 1978	TM1639334484; 51°58′00″N 1°08′55″E		1180357	Upload Photo	Q26475572
Quarnams	II	Stutton Green			22 February 1955	TM1607634485; 51°58′01″N 1°08′39″E		1036865	Upload Photo	Q26288543
Stables and Carriage House Approximately 30 Metres West of Stutton House	II	Stutton Green			23 February 1989	TM1605634383; 51°57′57″N 1°08′37″E		1351659	Upload Photo	Q26634741
Stutton House	II	Stutton Green			23 February 1989	TM1610634358; 51°57′56″N 1°08′40″E		1285507	Upload Photo	Q26574197
Garden Wall and Gateway Attached to and Enclosing A Garden to North of Stutton Hall	II*	Stutton Park			23 February 1989	TM1403433746; 51°57′40″N 1°06′50″E		1180369	Upload Photo	Q17533637
Stutton Hall	II*	Stutton Park			22 February 1955	TM1403233702; 51°57′38″N 1°06′50″E		1036866	Upload Photo	Q17533171

== See also ==
- Grade I listed buildings in Suffolk
- Grade II* listed buildings in Suffolk

== Sources ==
- Bettely, James; Pevsner, Nikolaus (2015) [1961], Suffolk: West, The Buildings of England, New Haven and London: Yale University Press, ISBN 978-0-300-19655-9
