= Henry Edward Kendall =

English architect (1776–1875)

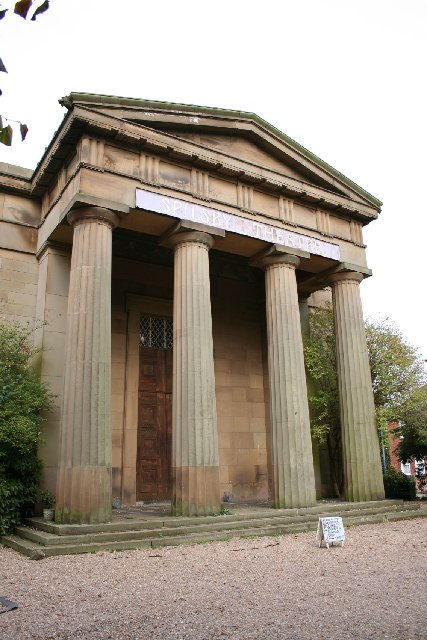
- Spilsby, Lincolnshire. Sessions House by Kendall
- Born: 23 March 1776; York, England
- Died: 1875 (aged 98–99); Westminster, England
- Occupation: Architect
- Children: Henry Edward Kendall Jr.
- Design: Kensal Green Cemetery

Henry Edward Kendall (23 March 1776 – 4 January 1875) was an English architect.

== Career ==
Kendall was a student of Thomas Leverton and possibly of John Nash. His wide-ranging styles included Greek, Italian and Tudor Revival.

His son, Henry Edward Kendall Jr. (1805–1885) was also an architect and, for a while, the two ran a practice together, which, in 1834, was located at 17, Suffolk Street, London. The Esplanade and Tunnel in Kemp Town, Brighton, dating between 1828 and 1830, was one of their notable works.

Lewis Cubitt (who married his daughter Sophia in 1830) was amongst those who worked at the practice before setting up on his own. Both were amongst the co-founders of what became the Royal Institute of British Architects.

Kendall designed many civic buildings including workhouses, hospitals and schools. In 1832 he won the hundred guinea prize for his Gothic design for Kensal Green Cemetery and his Italianate design was runner-up, yet, despite this, his designs were overlooked in favour of a Greek revival design by John Griffith. The cemetery contains a monument to Kendall's son, attributed to Kendall senior.

Henry Edward Kendall died in Westminster, 4 January 1875, aged 98.

== H.E. Kendall in Lincolnshire ==
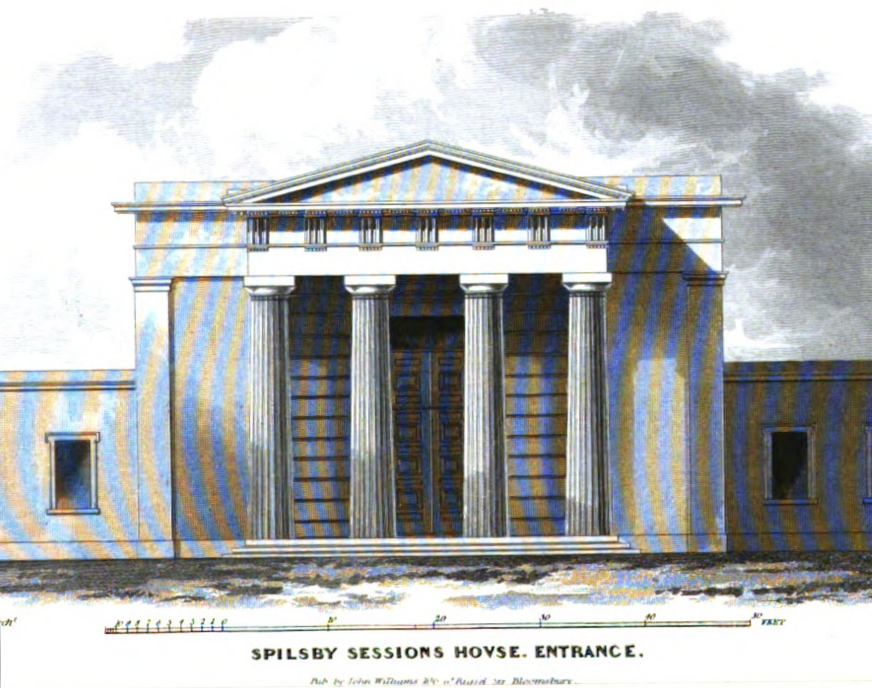
Spilsby Sessions House 1824-6

Some of Kendall's earliest work and commissions were in Lincolnshire, where he specialised in Court or Session houses and Prisons or Houses of Correction. His first works were the Spalding House of Correction in 1824 and the Spilsby Sessions House of 1824–6. The Spalding House of Correction was built in the Sheep Market at a cost of £15,000. In 1834 the prison had 45 sleeping cells and seven dayrooms or wards. In 1842 it was said to contain 48 sleeping cells, sixteen dayrooms and seven yards, as well as a governor's house, chapel and treadmill. The prison was handed over to the Prison Commissioners following nationalisation of the prison system in 1878. It closed in 1884. The prison was demolished in the 1920s when the Drill Hall was built on the site. Kendall appears to have built a very similar prison block at Spilsby in 1824–6. The plans and specifications are given in C. Davy's Architectural Precedents of 1841 At Spilsby an impressive court or Sessions House was added at the front of the prison with a Doric portico. Ancaster stone was used for the exterior of the Sessions House, but stone from quarries near Barnsley was used for the columns of the portico The Spilsby prison was followed by a further prison at Louth in Lincolnshire around 1828.

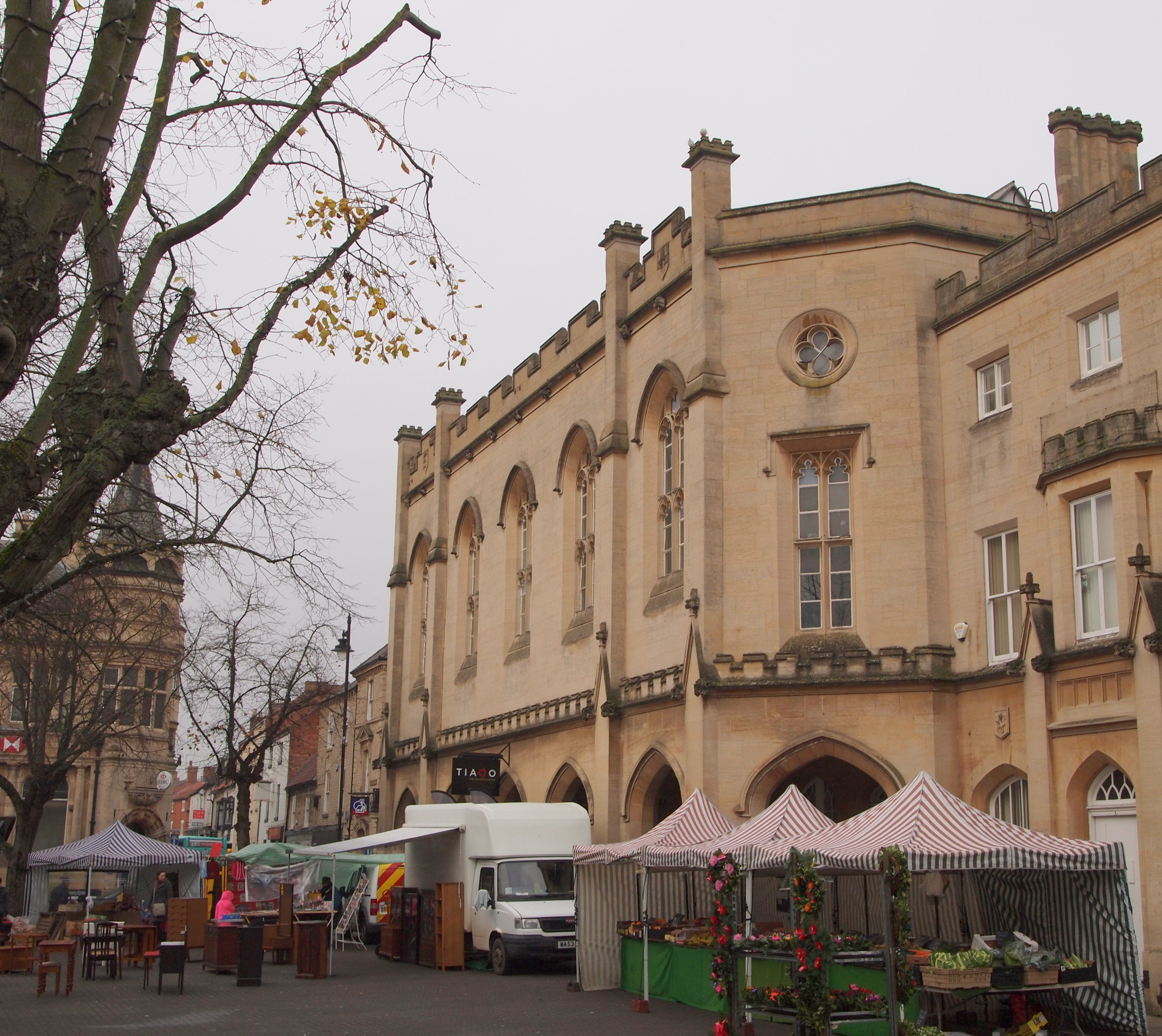
Sleaford Sessions House

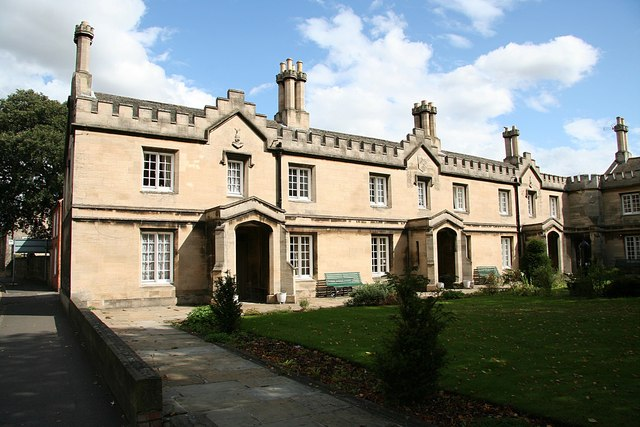
Carre's Hospital, Sleaford

In 1828 Kendall won the competition for building the Sessions House in Sleaford in a Tudor Gothic revival style for the Kesteven magistrates. Kendall was to work closely with the local builder and architect Charles Kirk on this project. This was followed by Carr's Hospital of 1830 in Sleaford. Kendall was also responsible, probably working with Kirk for the remodelling of Haverholme Priory in a Tudor Gothic style, and for additions to Aswarby Park in 1836-38. and Fishtoft Rectory.

== Paintings ==
Kendall exhibited paintings of architectural subjects at the Royal Academy between 1799 and 1843.

== Gallery : Works by Kendall ==
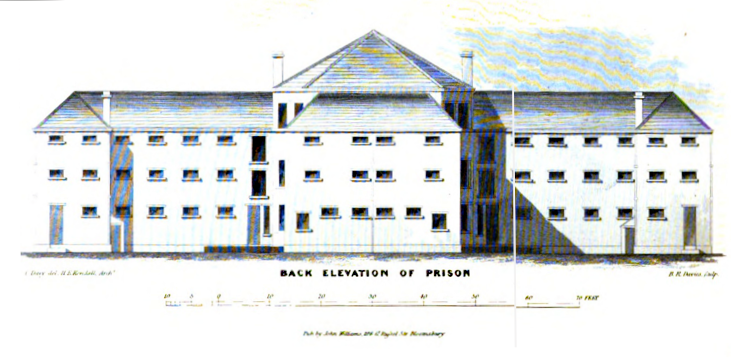
Spilsby Gaol, Rear elevation

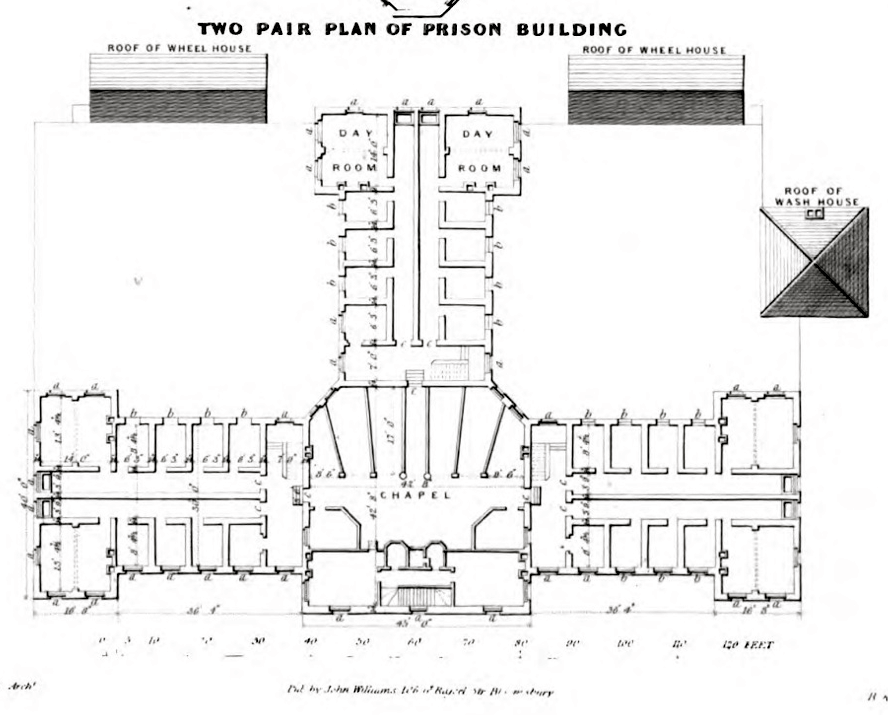
Plan of Spilsby Gaol

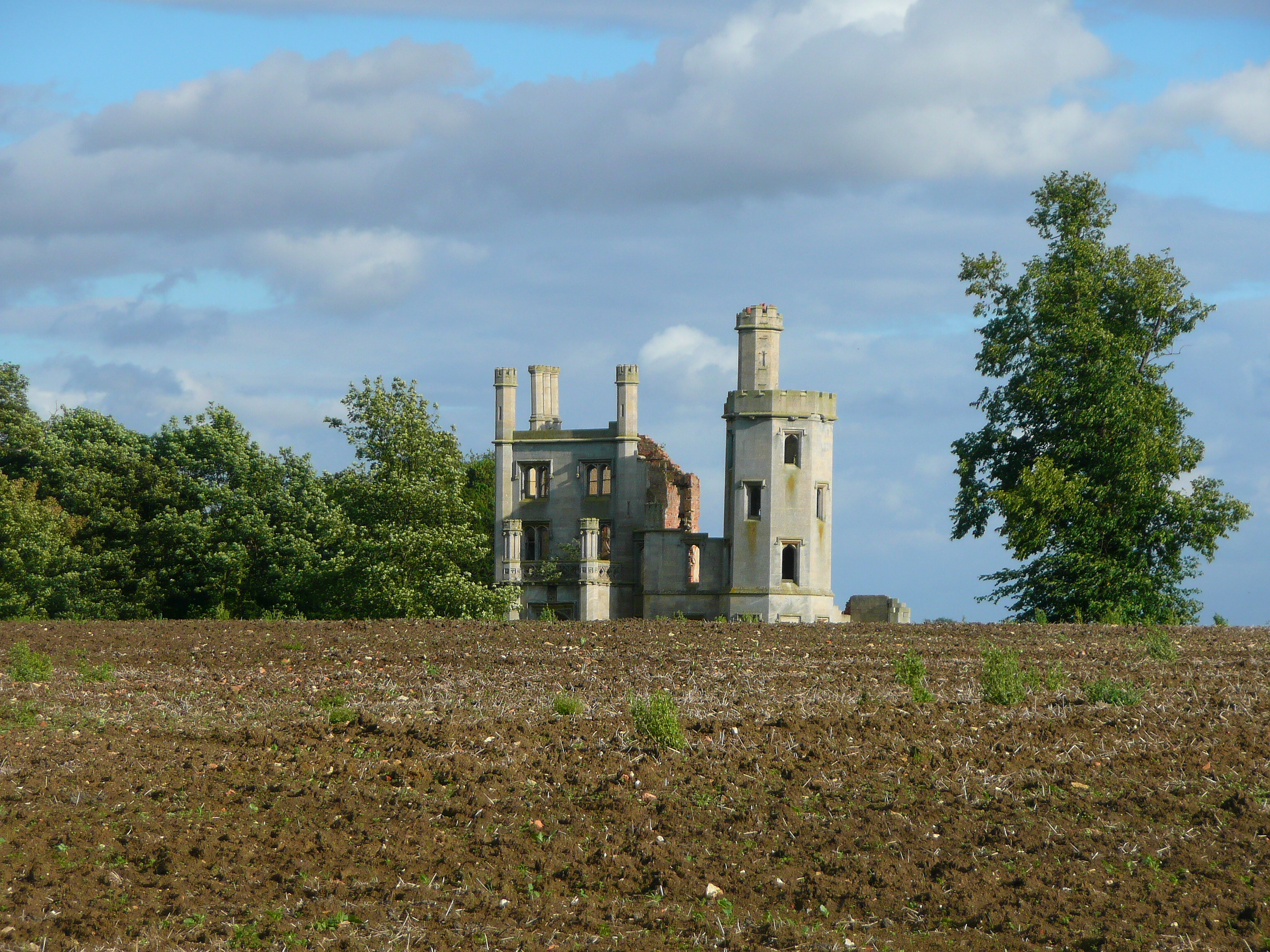
Haverholme Priory to-day

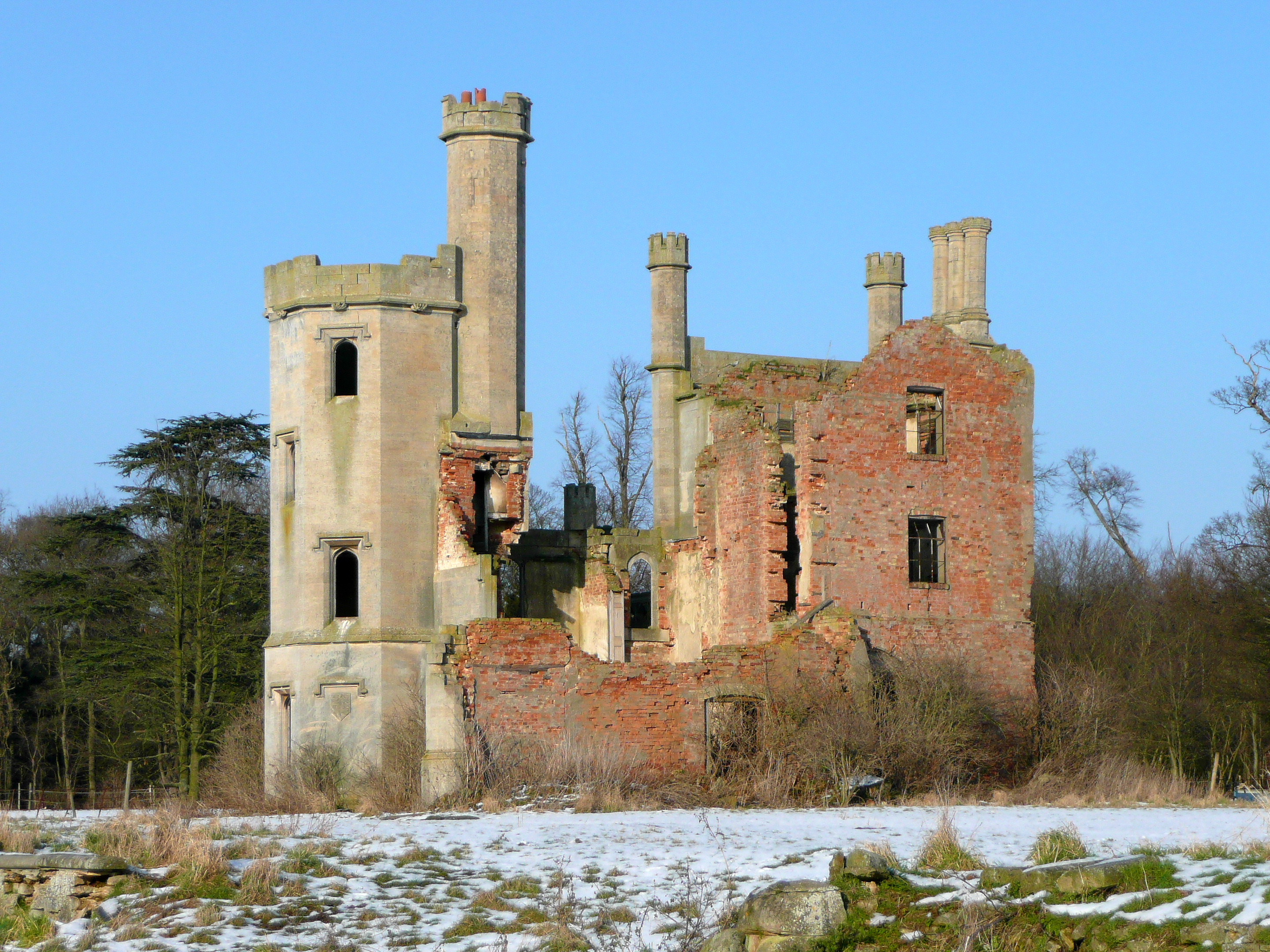
The Remains Of Haverholme Priory

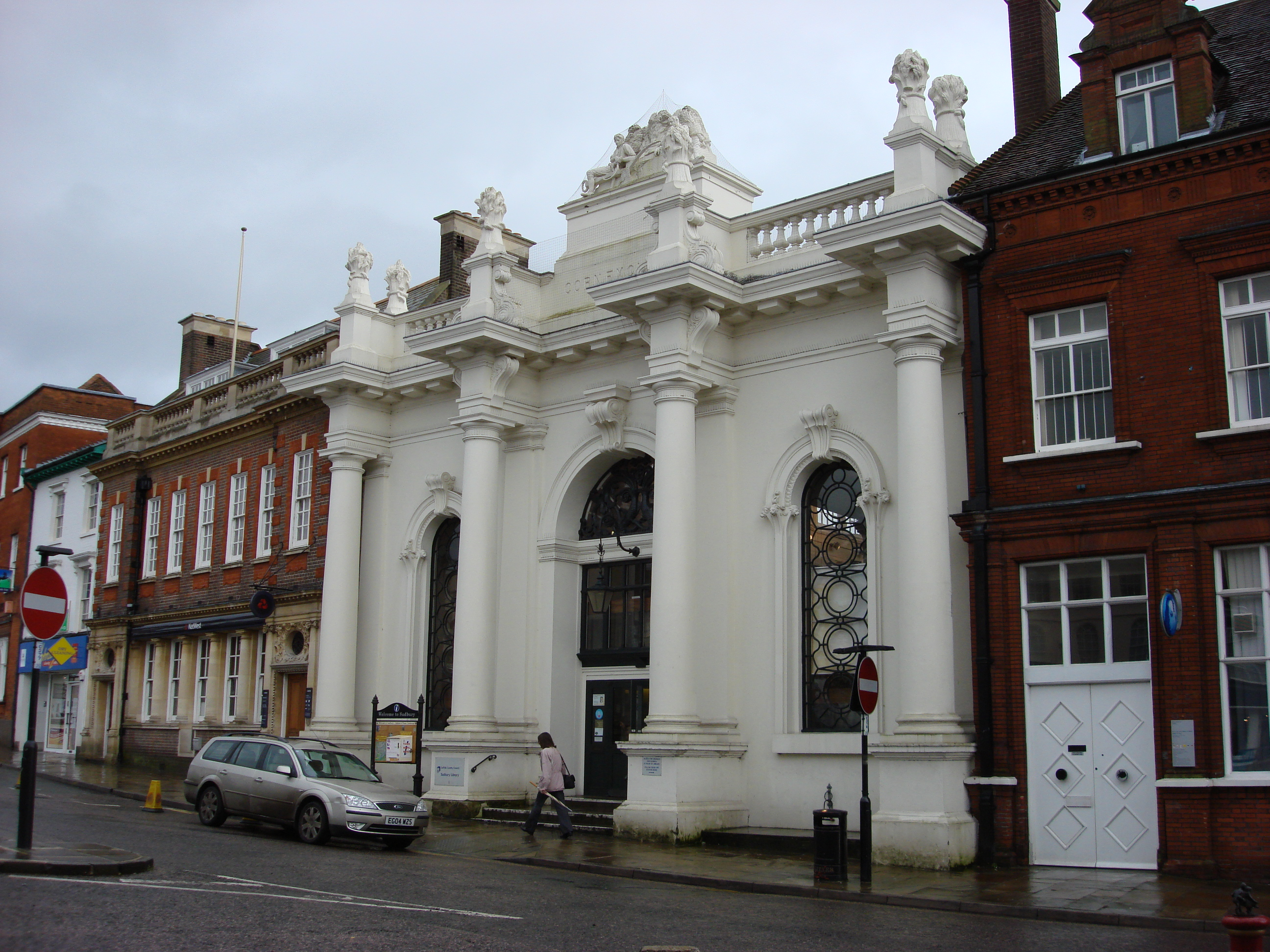
Corn Exchange, Sudbury, Suffolk 1841-2

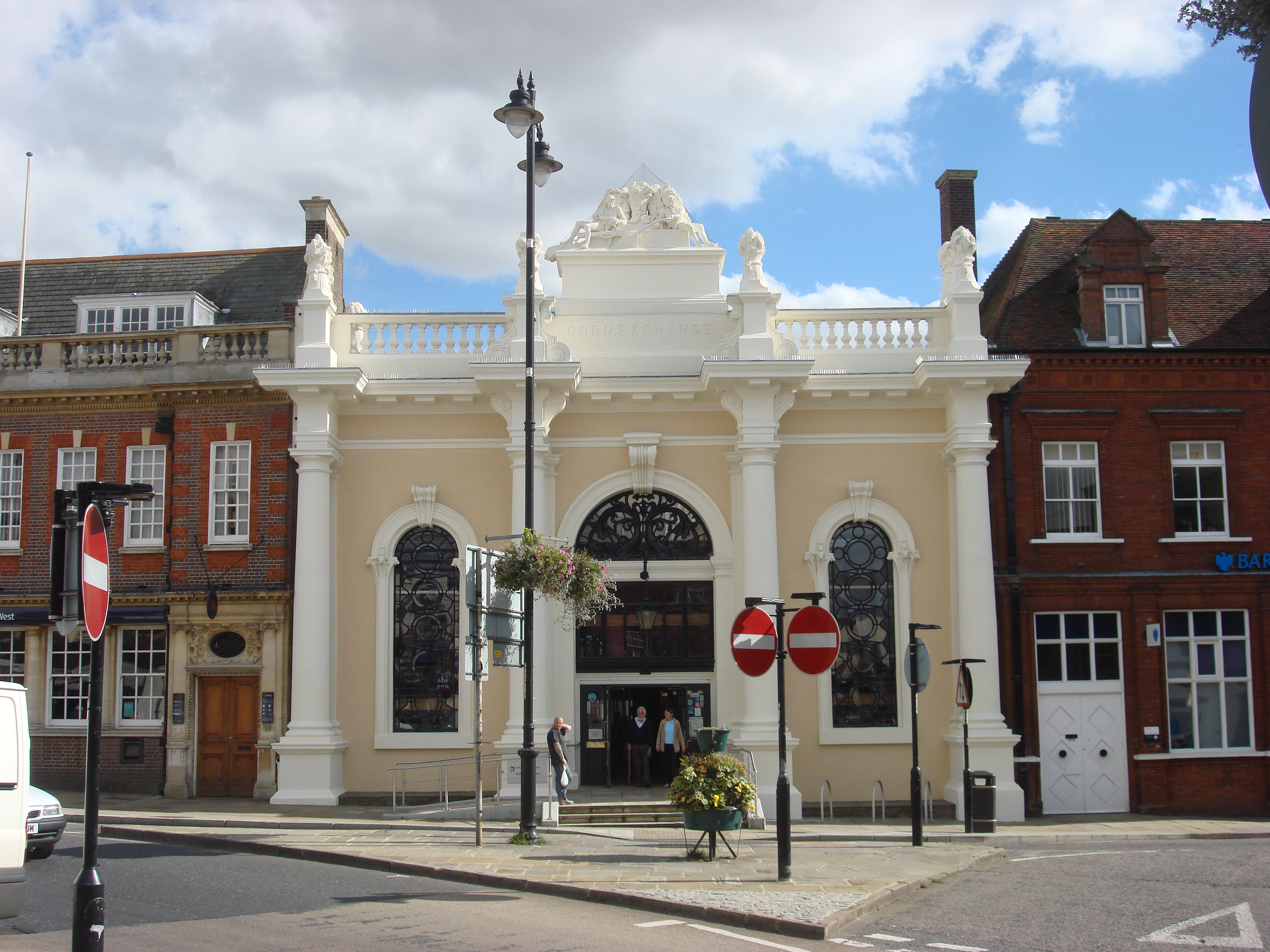
Corn Exchange, Sudbury, Suffolk

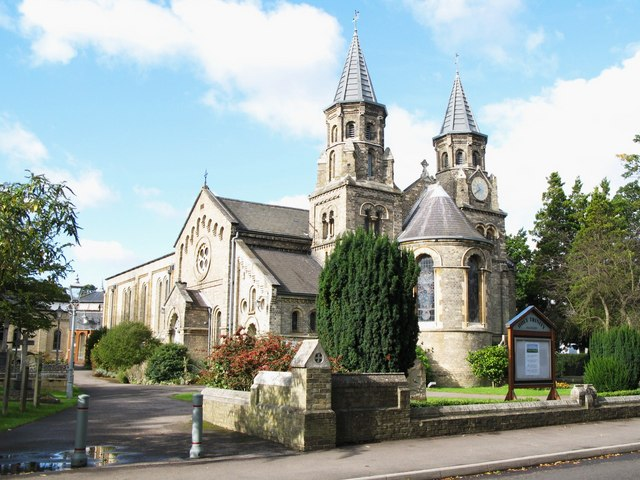
Holy Trinity Church, Claygate, Surrey, 1840

== Bibliography ==
- Colvin H. A (1995), Biographical Dictionary of British Architects 1600-1840. Yale University Press, 3rd edition London, pp. 575–76..
