= Corn Exchange, Sudbury =

Commercial building in Sudbury, Suffolk, England

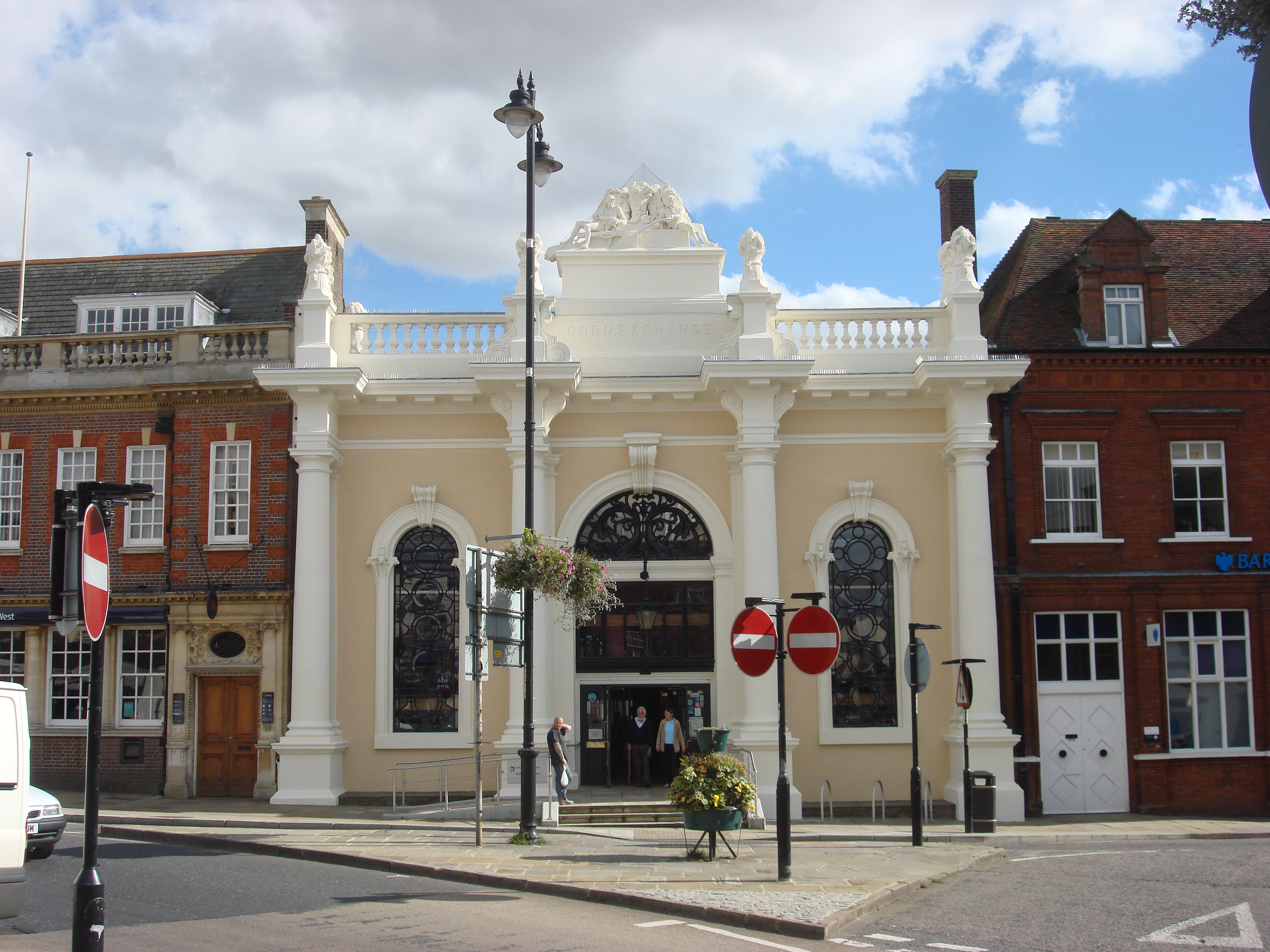
- Corn Exchange, Sudbury

- Shown in Suffolk
- 52.0381°N 0.7301°E
- Location: Market Hill, Sudbury

History
- Built: 1842

Site notes
- Architect: Henry Edward Kendall
- Architectural style: Baroque Revival style

Listed Building – Grade II*
- Official name: Corn Exchange Public Library
- Designated: 26 October 1971
- Reference no.: 1037457

The Corn Exchange is a commercial building on Market Hill, Sudbury, Suffolk, England. The structure, which is used as a public library, is a Grade II* listed building.

== History ==
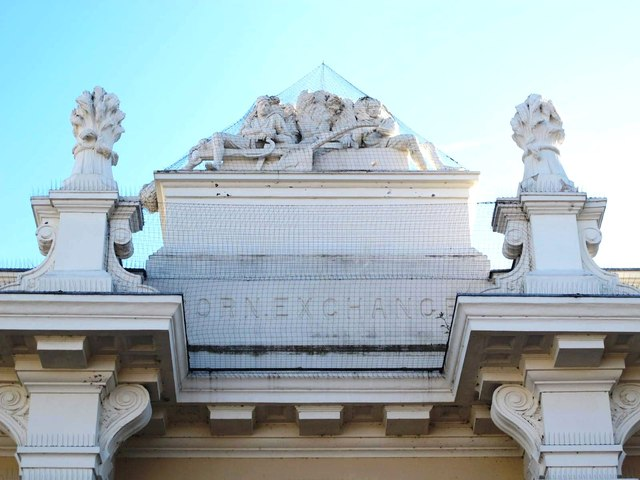
A view of the sculpture

In the late 1830s, a group of local businessmen decided to form a private company, known as the "Sudbury Market House Company", to finance and commission a purpose-built corn exchange for the town. The site selected, at the bottom of Market Hill, had been occupied by several properties including a chemist and druggist.

The building was designed by Henry Edward Kendall in the Baroque Revival style, built by Stephen Webb of Long Melford in brick with a stucco finish at a cost of £1,620, and was completed in October 1842. The design involved a symmetrical main frontage of three bays facing onto Market Hill. The central bay featured a tall round headed opening, containing a doorway, a six-part window and a fanlight, with an architrave and a keystone. The outer bays were fenestrated by tall round headed windows with architraves and keystones. The bays were flanked by full-height Tuscan order columns supporting an entablature and surmounted by carvings of wheat sheaves. At roof level, there was a central panel inscribed with the words "Corn Exchange", which was surmounted by a pedestal supporting a sculpture carved in coade stone depicting a group of agricultural labourers, with sickles and wheat sheaves. There was a balustraded parapet above the outer bays. The architectural historian, Nikolaus Pevsner, was impressed with the design, which he said "deserves a glance, if only to meditate on the early Victorian sense of security, superiority, and prosperity".

The use of the building as a corn exchange declined significantly in the wake of the Great Depression of British Agriculture in the late 19th century. Instead, it was used for concerts and public meetings: a rendition of The Messiah by George Frideric Handel was performed in the main hall in February 1886. The building acted as an air raid shelter during the Second World War.

However, by the early 1960s, the building had become dilapidated, and the owners were initially minded to sell it to Tesco, to facilitate the construction of a modern supermarket on the site. Following a successful campaign by the members of the specially formed Corn Exchange Preservation Association, led by a local solicitor, Andrew Phillips, to save the building from demolition, it was sold to West Suffolk County Council instead. After the completion of an extensive programme of works, undertaken by George Grimwood & Sons to a design by the county architect, Jack Digby, it re-opened as a public library on 24 September 1968. The exterior of the building was restored in 1993, and again in 2010.

== See also ==
- Corn exchanges in England
- Grade II* listed buildings in Babergh
