= Murder of Bernard Oliver =

Unsolved UK murder case

Bernard Oliver
- Born: Bernard Michael Oliver; 1950; England, United Kingdom
- Died: c. 14 January 1967; Unknown. Possibly Suffolk, England
- Cause of death: Strangulation
- Resting place: St Pancras Cemetery, Finchley, London, England; 51.59876°N 0.16735°W (approximate)
- Occupation: Labourer
- Known for: Victim of unsolved murder
- Height: 5 ft 3 in (1.60 m)

Bernard Michael Oliver (1950 – January 1967) was a young British warehouse worker from Muswell Hill, North London. He disappeared on 6 January 1967, and his remains were found ten days later in the village of Tattingstone, Suffolk. His body had been cut into eight pieces and left in two suitcases. For this reason the crime is sometimes referred to as the Tattingstone Suitcase Murder. The case received widespread media attention, partly because police, unable to identify the body, took the unusual step of releasing a photograph of the victim's head to the media.

The murder remains unsolved.

== Disappearance and murder ==
On Friday, 6 January 1967, Oliver did not return home after spending the evening with friends, and was reported missing by his father the following morning. Several days later, on 16 January, farm worker Fred Burggy discovered human remains in two suitcases left behind a hedge in a field near the village of Tattingstone, Suffolk. It was believed that the murder had occurred around 48 hours before the discovery of the body. Post-mortem tests showed that Oliver had been sexually assaulted and strangled before his body was dismembered. Unable to determine the identity of the victim, police took the unusual step of releasing a photograph of the victim's head to the media. Oliver's family contacted the police after seeing the photograph.

== Investigation ==
The police investigation was initially led by Detective Superintendent Tom Tarling of East Suffolk Police, before being taken over by Detective Superintendent Harry Tappin of the Metropolitan Police. The location of the murder has never been identified, although police believed that the murder and dismemberment had taken place in Suffolk.

Following the murder, witnesses reported sightings of Oliver in and around the Muswell Hill area in the time between his disappearance and the discovery of his body. In Tattingstone, a witness said she saw “a man, who was middle-aged and wearing a dark trilby and a long trench coat, walking in the direction of Tattingstone on the Harwich road, carrying a suitcase” on the night the suitcases were left.

Several pieces of physical evidence were recovered. One of the two suitcases used to contain Oliver's remains bore the initials "P.V.A.". The laundry mark "QL 42" was also found on a hand towel inside one of the two suitcases. A matchbox found in the pocket of Oliver's jacket was from a brand of matches marketed in Israel.

The investigation was re-opened in 1977. In 2012, a man reported seeing two unattended suitcases and a man wearing medical gloves in the Ipswich docks area days before Oliver's body was discovered. The investigation was once again re-opened in 2017 when police appealed for any information concerning the murder.

== Suspects ==
In 2004, documents released under the Freedom of Information Act 2000 revealed that the prime suspects in the murder were two medical doctors, Martin Reddington and John Byles.

Martin Bruce Reddington (26 June 1931 – May 1995) had a surgery in Muswell Hill. In 1965 a warrant had been issued for Reddington's arrest on charges of buggery and indecent assault of males. However, before inquiries could be completed, he left the UK for South Africa. Reddington made a number of return visits to the UK, but no evidence has been found placing him in the vicinity of the murder. In 1977, a private investigator claimed to recognise the suitcase with the initials P.V.A. on its side as belonging to three men who used a laundrette in Muswell Hill, one of whom was Reddington. Reddington was never interviewed in connection with the offence, and it was decided there was insufficient evidence to extradite him from Australia. In 1977 Reddington was charged in Sydney with committing an indecent assault on a male. He died in May 1995, aged 63.

John Roussel Byles (27 January 1933 – 19 January 1975) was acquitted along with another man in November 1963 of assaulting a 16-year-old male at their flat in Earl's Court, London. Byles left the UK for Australia in the early 1970s when inquiries began into the sexual abuse of boys aged between 9 and 14 in Huddersfield. On 17 December 1974, Byles was arrested in Sydney in relation to an alleged indecent assault on a boy, but absconded on $2,000 bail. His body was found in a room of the Prince of Wales Hotel in Proserpine, Queensland on 19 January 1975. He left two suicide notes, one addressed to Scotland Yard, the other to Reddington. The note to the police contained an apology for his actions, but no direct reference was made to the Tattingstone murder.

Reddington and Byles are also said to have been suspects in the murder of a boy in London in 1973, following an apparent homosexual relationship. At this time homosexuality was only legal between two consenting male adults aged 21 and above.

Joe Meek (5 April 1929 – 3 February 1967) was a record producer and songwriter who ran a recording studio at 304 Holloway Road, Islington, in North London. Police in the Oliver investigation announced their intent to interview all of the homosexual men in London. This would have included Meek, following a 1963 conviction for “importuning for immoral purposes” in a public toilet. Some accounts claim that Meek was afraid of being questioned. It was rumoured that Oliver had worked as a tape-stacker in Meek's studio. On 3 February 1967, Meek killed himself after murdering his landlady, Violet Shenton.

Reginald Kray (24 October 1933 – 1 October 2000) was a gangster from the East End of London, sentenced to life imprisonment along with his brother Ronald in 1969 for the murders of George Cornell and Jack McVitie. In September 2000, Kray confessed to a previously unknown murder while being interviewed for the BBC documentary Reggie Kray: The Final Word. A former cellmate of Kray's, Pete Gillett, claimed that Kray had also confessed the murder to him, and that the victim was "a young gay boy". It has been suggested that this is a reference to Oliver's murder, although the confession is widely believed to relate to the disappearance of Edward “Mad Teddy” Smith in 1967. The Kray brothers were sent to Suffolk as evacuees during World War II, and bought a house at Bildeston – approximately 16 miles (26 km) from Tattingstone – in 1968.

== In popular culture ==
The murder of Bernard Oliver forms part of the background to the 1998 novel The Long Firm, by Jake Arnott.

== See also ==
- List of solved missing person cases (1950–1969)
