= Freston Tower =

Folly tower in Freston, Suffolk, England

Coordinates: 52.0127°N 1.1723°E

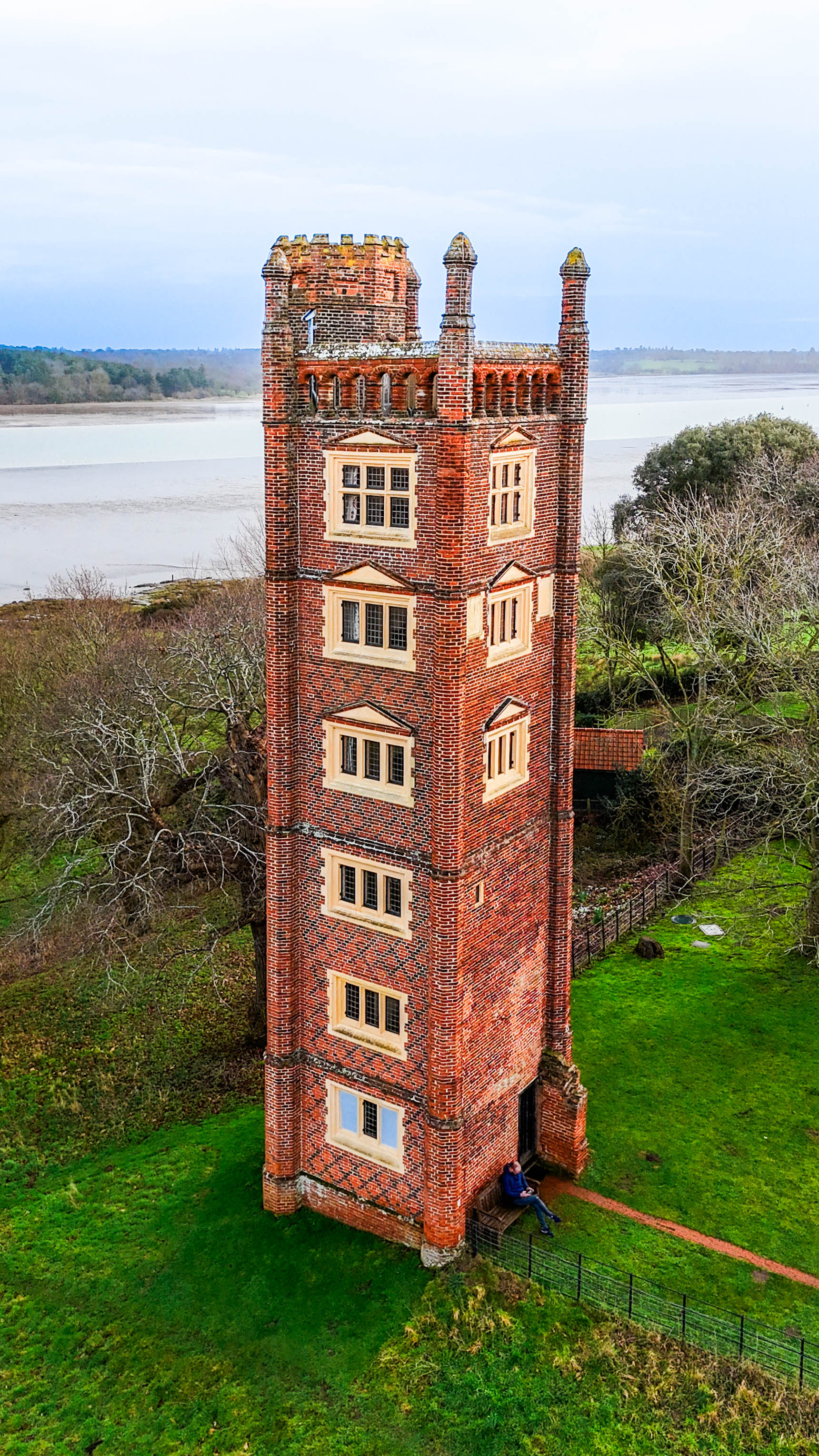
Freston Tower overlooking the river Orwell

Freston Tower is a six-storey red brick folly south of Ipswich, Suffolk in the village of Freston. It stands on the banks of the River Orwell.

== History ==
=== Construction date ===
Arguably the oldest folly in England, the tower has various claims for construction dates, ranging from the 15th to 17th centuries.

There is a legend that the tower was built by "Lord de Freston" in the 15th century for his daughter Ellen, so she could study a different subject on a different floor six days of the week: the 1st floor was dedicated to reception, the 2nd to tapestry working, the 3rd to music, the 4th to painting, the 5th to literature and the 6th to astronomy, complete with instruments for taking observations. This was written about in a novel by Reverend Richard Cobbold entitled Freston Tower: A Tale of the Times of Cardinal Wolsey (1850) and so should not be taken as fact. There is much evidence against this legend, such as documents apparently referring to the construction of the tower within the twelve years preceding 1569, and it is likely that the tower was constructed by Edward Latymer as a lookout over Freston Reach of the River Orwell. There are further descriptions suggesting a construction date of 1655.

The Landmark Trust, a historical building preservation charity and the current owner of Freston Tower, suggests the tower "was built in 1578 by a wealthy Ipswich merchant called Thomas Gooding".

=== Uses ===
By 1730, the tower was available to let, complete with furniture. Between 1772 and 1779, Freston Tower was used for smallpox patients under inoculation.

== Modern use ==
Most recently owned by Claire Hunt until 1999, Freston Tower was donated to the current owner the Landmark Trust, a charity that rescues and restores historical buildings. In 2004, the tower was being made available to let as a holiday home.
