= All Saints Church, Newton Green =

Coordinates: 52.0365°N 0.7974°E

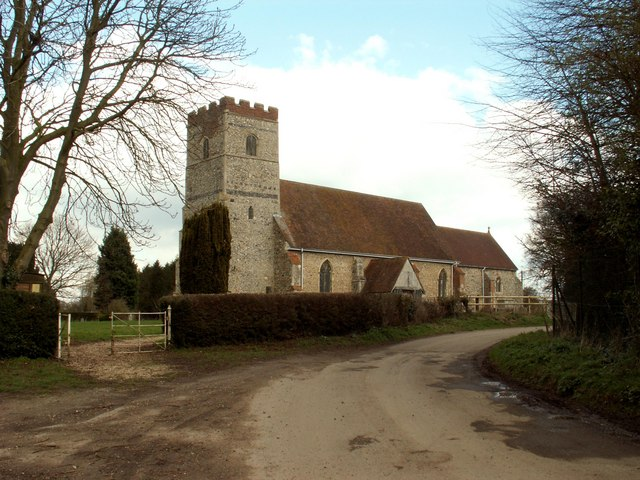
- All Saints Church, Newton Green, from the southwest

- Location in Suffolk
- OS grid reference: TL 920 413
- Location: Newton Green, Suffolk
- Country: England
- Denomination: Anglican
- Website: Churches Conservation Trust

Architecture
- Functional status: Part redundant, part active
- Heritage designation: Grade II*
- Designated: 23 March 1961
- Architectural type: Church
- Style: Norman, Gothic

Specifications
- Materials: Flint with stone dressings and some brick

Clergy
- Rector: Revd Judith Sweetman

All Saints Church is a partly redundant Anglican church in the village of Newton Green, Suffolk, England. It is recorded in the National Heritage List for England as a designated Grade II* listed building. The chancel is still in use for worship, but the nave, porch and tower are redundant and vested in the care of the Churches Conservation Trust. The church stands towards the north of the village, some two miles east of Sudbury.

== History ==
Most of the church was rebuilt in the 14th century, replacing an earlier Norman church. The south porch was added in the 15th century, and restored in 1975. By the 1960s the church had fallen into disrepair, and it was divided at the chancel arch, the chancel continuing in use for worship.

== Architecture ==
=== Exterior ===
All Saints is constructed in flint with stone dressings, and some brick. The porch is timber-framed. Its plan consists of a nave with a south porch, a chancel with a north vestry, and a west tower. The tower has diagonal buttresses, and its battlemented parapet is constructed in brick. The north doorway in the nave is Norman, dating from the 12th century, probably from the 1130s or 1140s. It is round-arched, has two orders, scalloped capitals, and arches decorated with chevrons. The doorway has been partly blocked, forming a window in the upper part. The south doorway dates from the 13th century. The east window in the chancel has a 14th-century five-light window.

=== Interior ===
Inside the church, the chancel arch is blocked with glass in the upper part, and glazed doors in the lower part. On the south side of the nave is a tomb dating from about 1300 containing the effigy of a female. On the north wall is a series of 14th-century wall paintings depicting scenes relating to the Incarnation. In front of the paintings is a pre-Reformation pulpit in the shape of an hourglass. In the chancel are a piscina and a sedilia, both dating from the 14th century, and the elaborate tomb of Margaret Boteler who died in 1410. In the chancel windows are fragments of medieval stained glass. The font is octagonal, and dates from the 15th century.

== See also ==
- List of churches preserved by the Churches Conservation Trust in the East of England
