= Tattingstone Wonder =

Folly at Tattingstone in Suffolk, England

Coordinates: 51.9838°N 1.1137°E

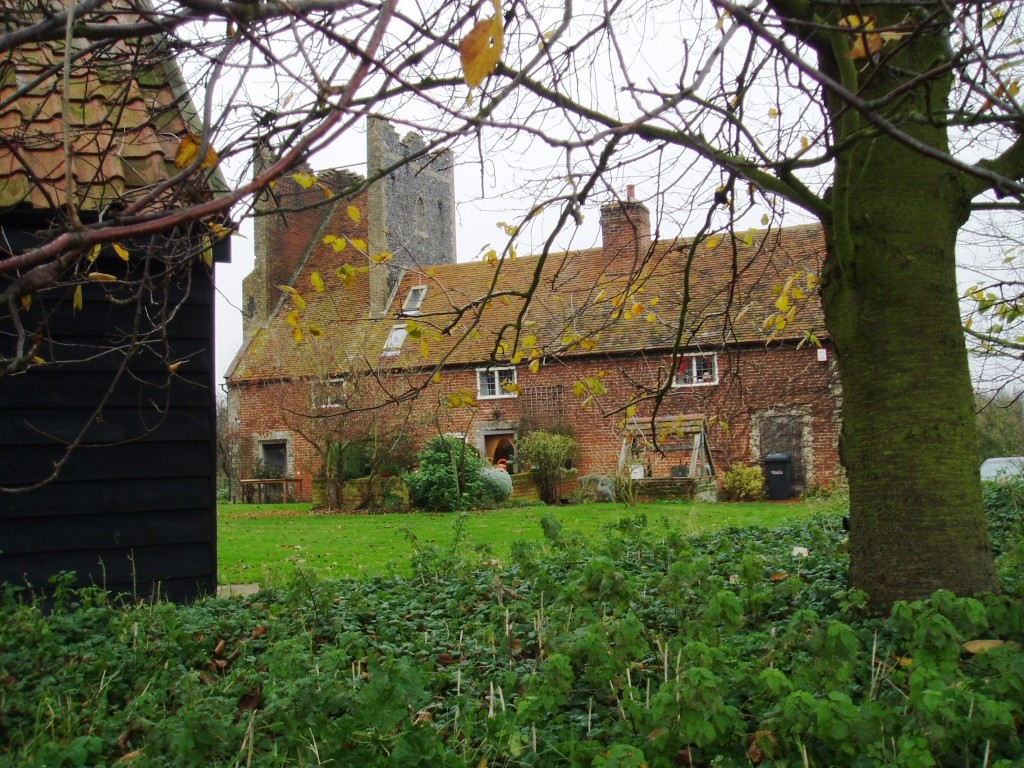
Tattingstone Folly, rear view (cottages)

The Tattingstone Wonder is a folly at Tattingstone in Suffolk, England.

Located some 6 miles (9.7 km) south of Ipswich the Tattingstone Wonder was originally two cottages. In 1790 Edward White, (Note: English Heritage gives the name of the squire as Thomas White.) the local squire, did not like his view of the cottages from Tattingstone Place. He decided to add a third cottage and finished them to look like a church by adding a fake tower and flint façade. It has become a famous Suffolk landmark.

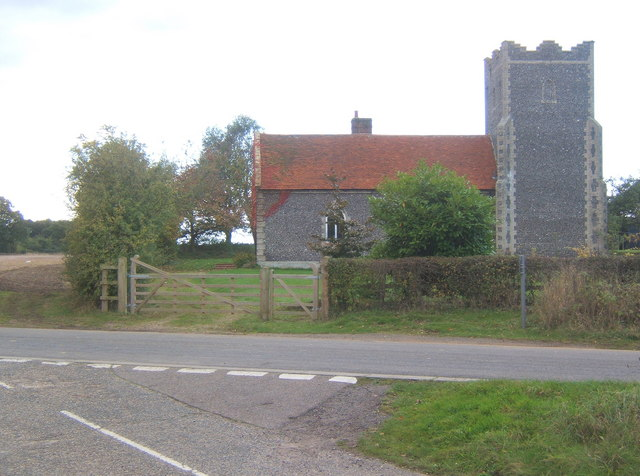
Tattingstone Folly, front view
