= Thorington Street =

Hamlet in Suffolk, England

Coordinates: 51.979°N 0.928°E

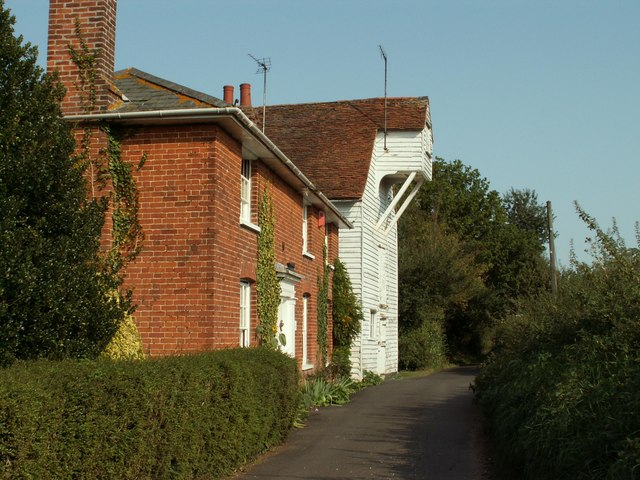

- Location within Suffolk
- Civil parish: Stoke-by-Nayland
- District: Babergh
- Shire county: Suffolk
- Region: East
- Country: England
- Sovereign state: United Kingdom
- Police: Suffolk
- Fire: Suffolk
- Ambulance: East of England

Thorington Street is a hamlet on the B1068 road, in the civil parish of Stoke-by-Nayland, in the Babergh district, in the county of Suffolk, England. The hamlet is in between the villages of Stoke-by-Nayland and Higham.. The hamlet has approximately 40 houses.

In 2026 Thorington Street was designated England's first International Dark Sky Community and hosts a Dark Sky Discovery Centre.

== Thorington Hall ==
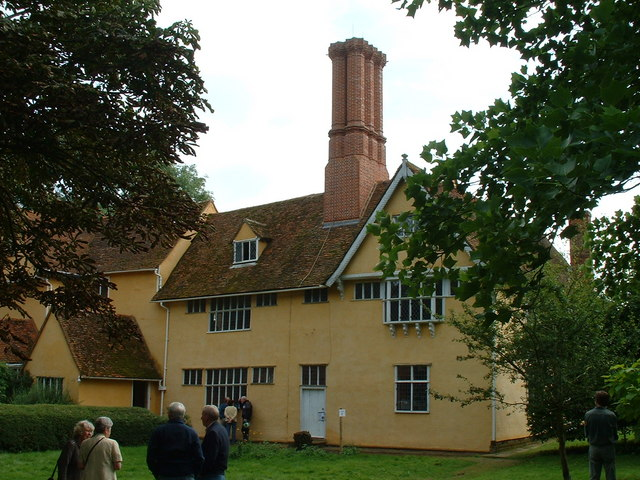
Thorington Hall

Thorington Hall is a Grade-II* Listed manor house, owned and managed by the National Trust, but not regularly open to the public. It is described as "one of the best timber-framed houses in Suffolk".

The building is timber-framed and plastered. The original house dated from the 16th-century, but little is known about it. The core of the house dates from the 17th-century, but was extended in the following century. The house also displays Witches' Mark (also known as Apotropaic Marks), and several other superstitious practices, including shoes which were left behind walls, bones under the floors and burns on the attic ceilings caused by candles (all thought to ward off evil spirits).

The house was owned by Thomas May until his death in 1645, after which passed through two more generations of his family, both also called Thomas May. In 1700 Thorington Hall was bought by a London Merchant called Bedingfield Heighman and his wife Esther. They extended the house and changed which way the house faced, creating the current entrance. Following their deaths Thorington Hall passed to their daughter, Hester Wade and then, in 1741, to her uncle Thomas White.

Thomas White sold the house in 1746 to Vice-Admiral Sir Joshua Rowley, Bart, of nearby Tendring Hall. Thorington Hall was then incorporated into the Tendring Hall estate and leased as a farmhouse. The same family held the tenancy from 1784 to 1901. The English physician Henry Bence Jones, son of Lieutenant-Colonel William Jones, was born in the Hall on 31 December 1813.

By 1912, Thorington Hall had fallen into disrepair, and by 1937 was "practically derelict". It was purchased the same year by Professor Lionel Penrose who restored the house and donated it to the National Trust in 1940. The Penrose family continued to live in the house until 1973.

During the Penrose's tennancy, the house was used as an evacuation hostel for the Friends Relief Service. Elderly Londoners who had lost their homes during World War II came to live at the Hall. These residents included "an old lady with a fondness for yodelling" and two widowed evacuees who married after meeting at the hall.

The Penrose family left in 1973. In 1976 the National Trust leased the house to "Mr and Mrs Wollaston" who lived in the hall until 2007. The house required modernisation as there was "stinging nettles growing under bookshelves and toothpaste freezing in the tube in winter". The house was modernised following the departure of the Wollastons, which included installing new plumbing and heating systems and upgrading the bathrooms and kitchen.

The house is again leased to a private tenant but is still owned and managed by the National Trust. The house is not regularly open to the public but has been known to take part in Heritage Open Days.
