= Chilton Hall =

Historic building in Suffolk, England

Coordinates: 52°03′02″N 0°45′20″E

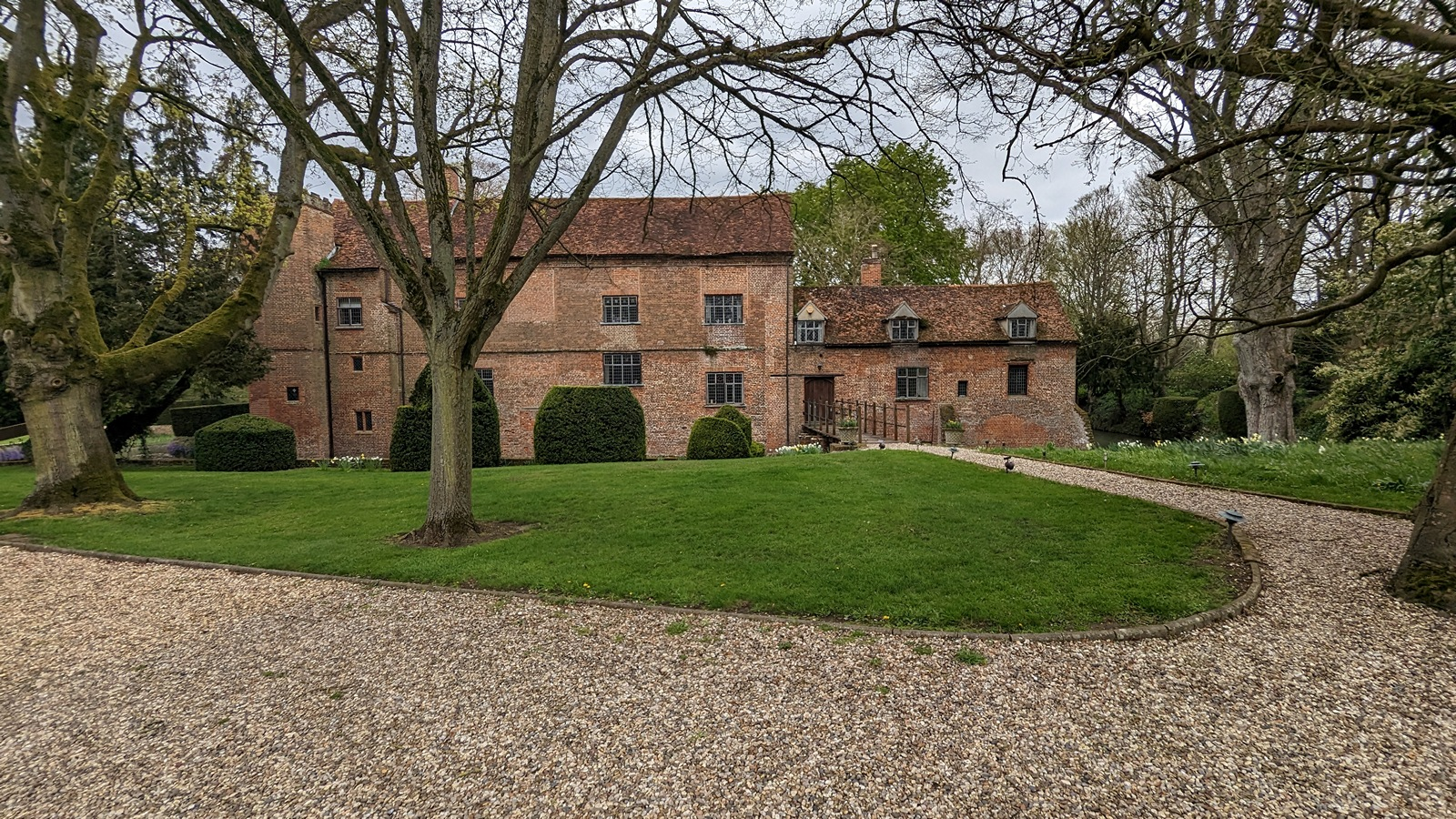

Chilton Hall is a Grade II* listed building in Chilton, Suffolk, England.

The current building replaced an important moated medieval house.

Of the original fifteenth century brickwork only one wing remains, as much of the house was destroyed by fire around 1800.
