= Bridge Cottage =

Historic cottage in Flatford, Suffolk, England

Coordinates: 51.95945°N 1.01866°E

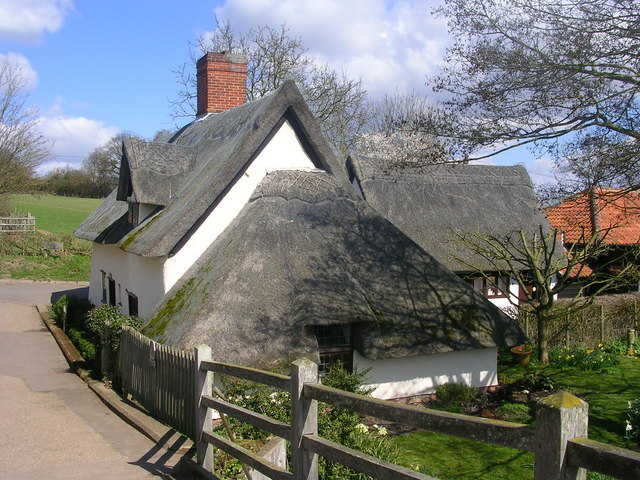
Bridge Cottage

Bridge Cottage is a 16th-century thatched cottage in Flatford, East Bergholt, Suffolk, England. It has been a National Trust property since 1943 and a Grade II* listed building since 1955. The National Trust market the property under the name "Flatford: Bridge Cottage". The building is timber framed, but this is not evident from the outside as it is rendered. The II* grading, unusual for an architecturally unremarkable cottage, "reflects the importance of the cottage as part of the Flatford Mill group and its significance in the work of John Constable".

The property is located in the heart of Dedham Vale, a typical Suffolk rural landscape. It is noted as the location for works by John Constable, and presents an exhibition of his paintings.

The cottage is located just upstream from Flatford Mill which, along with neighbouring Valley Farm and Willy Lott's Cottage, are leased to the Field Studies Council; a group uses them as locations for arts-based courses.

The property provides access to a number of walks along the River Stour.
