= Tattingstone =

Village in Suffolk, England

Coordinates: 51.99°N 1.110°E

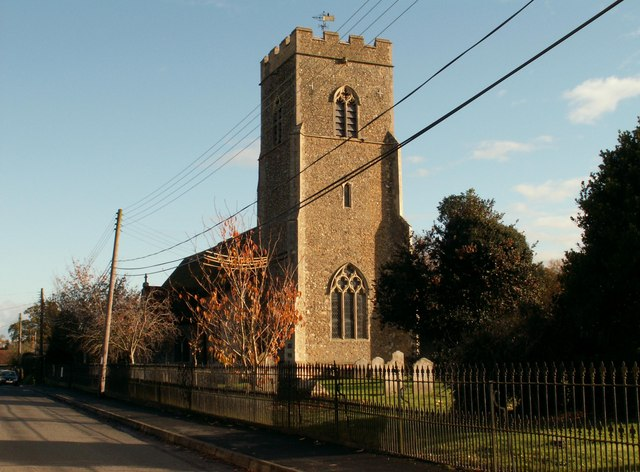
- St Mary's parish church

- Location within Suffolk
- Population: 540 (2011 Census)
- OS grid reference: TM1337
- Civil parish: Tattingstone
- District: Babergh
- Shire county: Suffolk
- Region: East
- Country: England
- Sovereign state: United Kingdom
- Post town: Ipswich
- Postcode district: IP9
- Dialling code: 01473
- Police: Suffolk
- Fire: Suffolk
- Ambulance: East of England
- Website: Tattingstone Village

Tattingstone is a village and civil parish in Suffolk, England. It is situated on the Shotley peninsula, about 5 miles (8 km) south of Ipswich. The 2011 Census recorded the population as 540.

== History ==
The Domesday Book of 1086 records the toponym as Tatituna or Tatistuna. It the location of Tattingstone Place and a folly known as the Tattingstone Wonder, a row of cottages disguised as a church by adding a flint façade and a dummy tower.

The parish has three distinct settlements. The main settlement includes the church, Tattingstone Park and the former Samford House of Industry, or Workhouse (1766–1930). This site was used as St Mary's hospital until it was redeveloped for housing in 1991. Tattingstone Heath is located on the A137, whilst a small hamlet close to the White Horse is connected to the rest of the parish by Lemons Hill bridge over the western end of Alton reservoir.

The Tattingstone Estate was bequeathed to Mr Western by his father's first cousin Thomas White in 1808. Tattingstone Church (OS grid TM1337) has a vault dedicated for Thomas Western (died 1814) and his wife Giulietta Roman (died 1850) and Thomas White (died 1808). The church was robbed on Thursday, 16 October 2008.

=== Tattingstone suitcases murder ===
In 1967 the remains of murder victim Bernard Oliver, a boy of sixteen or seventeen, were found in two suitcases in a field in Tattingstone on 16 January 1967, 10 days after his family reported him missing. Nobody was ever charged, though two now-deceased doctors were considered prime suspects.

== Reservoir ==
The village was split into two halves in the 1970s when the valley was flooded to make a 400-acre (1.6 km^{2}) reservoir. Alton Mill, which once stood in the way of the development, was dismantled and re-erected at the Museum of East Anglian Life in Stowmarket.

However, Tattingstone Alton Hall was not preserved and disappeared into the water. Over twenty houses and two farms were flooded to make way for the reservoir.

The pavilion which resides on the playing field in the village was constructed using the doors and some of the structural timbers from the boat house that was situated on the lakes that were in the valley prior to the flooding. The pavilion was built by five local men who used to live in the village.

The reservoir is managed by Anglian Water and is known as Alton Water or Alton Reservoir. It is now a haven for wildlife and is used by cyclists, walkers and fishermen and for other watersports.

== Notable buildings ==
There are twenty listed buildings in the parish, two of which are grade II* listed; the church of St Mary and the Tattingstone Wonder.

The Tattingstone Wonder is a strange folly built in about 1790 for the local Squire, Edward White, who then lived in the Hall. Originally a pair of cottages, a third was added together with a mock church tower and facade to give his neighbours "something to wonder at".

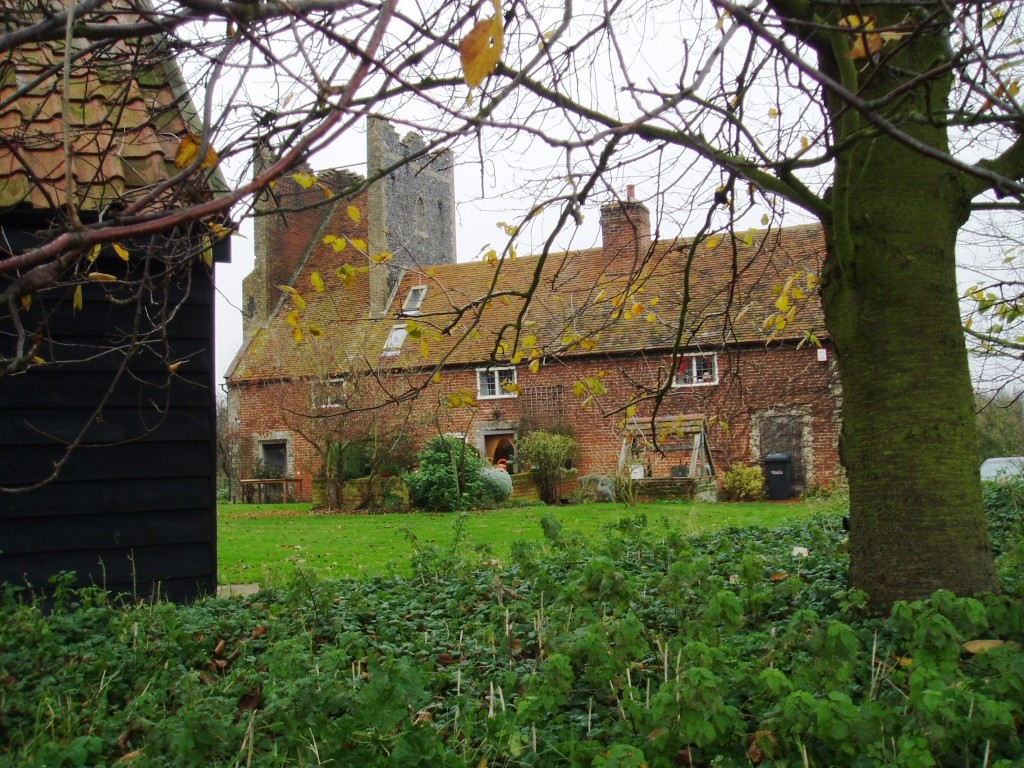
The Tattingstone Wonder from behind

The village has two pubs, the Wheatsheaf and the White Horse. A third, the Orange Box (formally called the Waterloo House, opposite the school) was closed in 2000; the building, which also had a village shop and post office, was demolished the same year.

== Notable residents ==
- Ann Candler (1740–1814), destitute poet known as The Suffolk Cottager.
- Edward Pearson (1756–1811), academic and theologian, Master of Sidney Sussex College, Cambridge and Vice chancellor of the University of Cambridge.
- John Preston Neale (1780–1847), architectural and landscape draughtsman.
- Charles Boileau Elliott (1803–1875), travel writer, Anglican clergyman, and rector of the parish.
- Basil Snell (1907-1986), Anglican clergyman, Archdeacon of Bedford, Archdeacon of St Albans, and rector of the parish.
- John Lyall (1940-2006), footballer and manager at West Ham United and Ipswich Town F.C.
- Rear Admiral Thomas Western (1761-1814) - his monument in the church is by John Flaxman
