= Shoulder of Mutton, Hadleigh =

Building in Hadleigh, Suffolk, England

Coordinates: 52°02′48″N 0°57′07″E

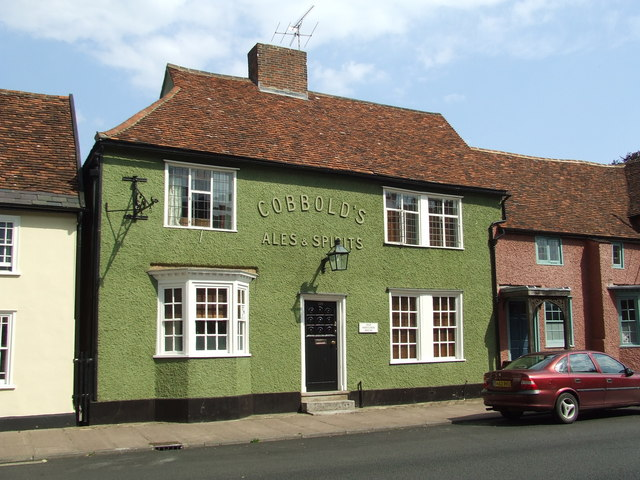
Premises of the former Shoulder of Mutton, now a residential house, 2009

The Shoulder of Mutton was a public house in Hadleigh, Suffolk, England. It originally occupied 124 and 126 Hadleigh High Street.

The Grade II* listed building dates back to the sixteenth century, but it had become a pub by 1796. The Sporting Magazine reported a wager over a run to the Fox.

The buildings were first listed in 1950. At that time it was a Tolly Cobbold pub, and a Tolly Cobbold agreement concerning the pub dates from 1961. However, by 1968 the premises were used as an antique shop.
