= Chelsworth =

Village and civil parish in Suffolk, England

Coordinates: 52.095°N 0.890°E

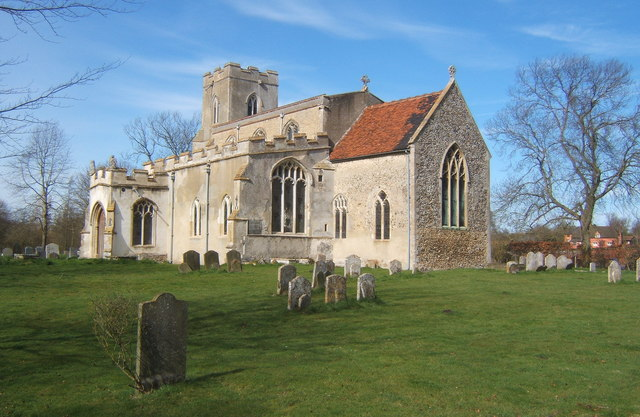
- All Saints' Church, Chelsworth

- Location within Suffolk
- Population: 206 (2011)
- OS grid reference: TL9847
- Civil parish: Chelsworth
- District: Babergh
- Shire county: Suffolk
- Region: East
- Country: England
- Sovereign state: United Kingdom
- Post town: Ipswich
- Postcode district: IP7
- UK Parliament: South Suffolk

Chelsworth is a village and civil parish in the Babergh district, in the county of Suffolk, England. It lies on the B1115 road, 10 miles in either direction from Sudbury and Stowmarket. The parish also contains the hamlet of Chelsworth Common. In 2011 the parish had a population of 206.

Built on the north bank of the River Brett, the entire village is classified as a conservation area, and contains numerous listed buildings.

The Saxons called the area Ceorleswyrthe. Recorded in Domesday as "Cerleswrda". Also be listed historically as Cheilesworth.

== History ==
Chelsworth has been settled for at least 1,000 years, as there are documents recording that King Edgar gave the village to Queen Æthelflæd in 962.

An old church stood in the village as far back as a 926 as mentioned in a charter to King Edgar, and a Domesday church was first recorded in 1086.

All Saints', the present church building in the west of the village, is mainly 14th and 15th century and is completely cement rendered. It has an entrance through someone’s front garden, so many churches must have been like this, but they have all had their access rerouted along driveways.

The manor anciently belonged to the Howards, and afterwards to the family of De Vere. In 1737 it became, by purchase, the property of Robert Pocklington Esq., who erected Chelsworth House. Chelsworth House is situated 330 yards further south from the bridge and Chelsworth Park and Common further out still.

A narrow hump-backed bridge to the south, part of which dates from 1754, crosses the river.

Charles Peck, the only one of its sons lost to the horror of the First World War, was 19 when he died in September 1917. He is remembered by a little war memorial in the church. George Stracey Smyth (1767 – 1823), the 2nd Lieutenant-Governor of New Brunswick, is also commemorated here.

The Grange was close to the church.

== Present day ==
The Peacock Inn, which has been in existence over 400 years, is on the B1115 in the centre of the village and up to 1976 was the village shop as well.

The famous ‘Chelsworth Open Gardens Day’ has been held on the last Sunday in June for nearly 50 years.
