= Newton, Suffolk =

Village in Suffolk, England

Coordinates: 52.032°N 0.792°E

Newton
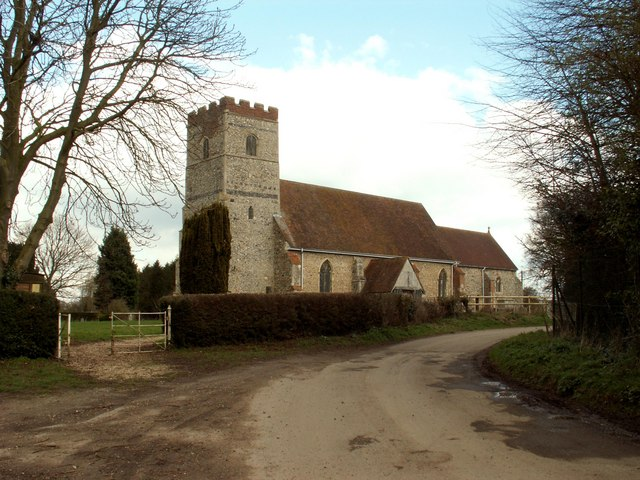
- All Saints Church, Newton

- Location within Suffolk
- Population: 495 (2011)
- OS grid reference: TL9140
- District: Babergh
- Shire county: Suffolk
- Region: East
- Country: England
- Sovereign state: United Kingdom
- Post town: Sudbury
- Postcode district: CO10
- Dialling code: 01787
- Police: Suffolk
- Fire: Suffolk
- Ambulance: East of England

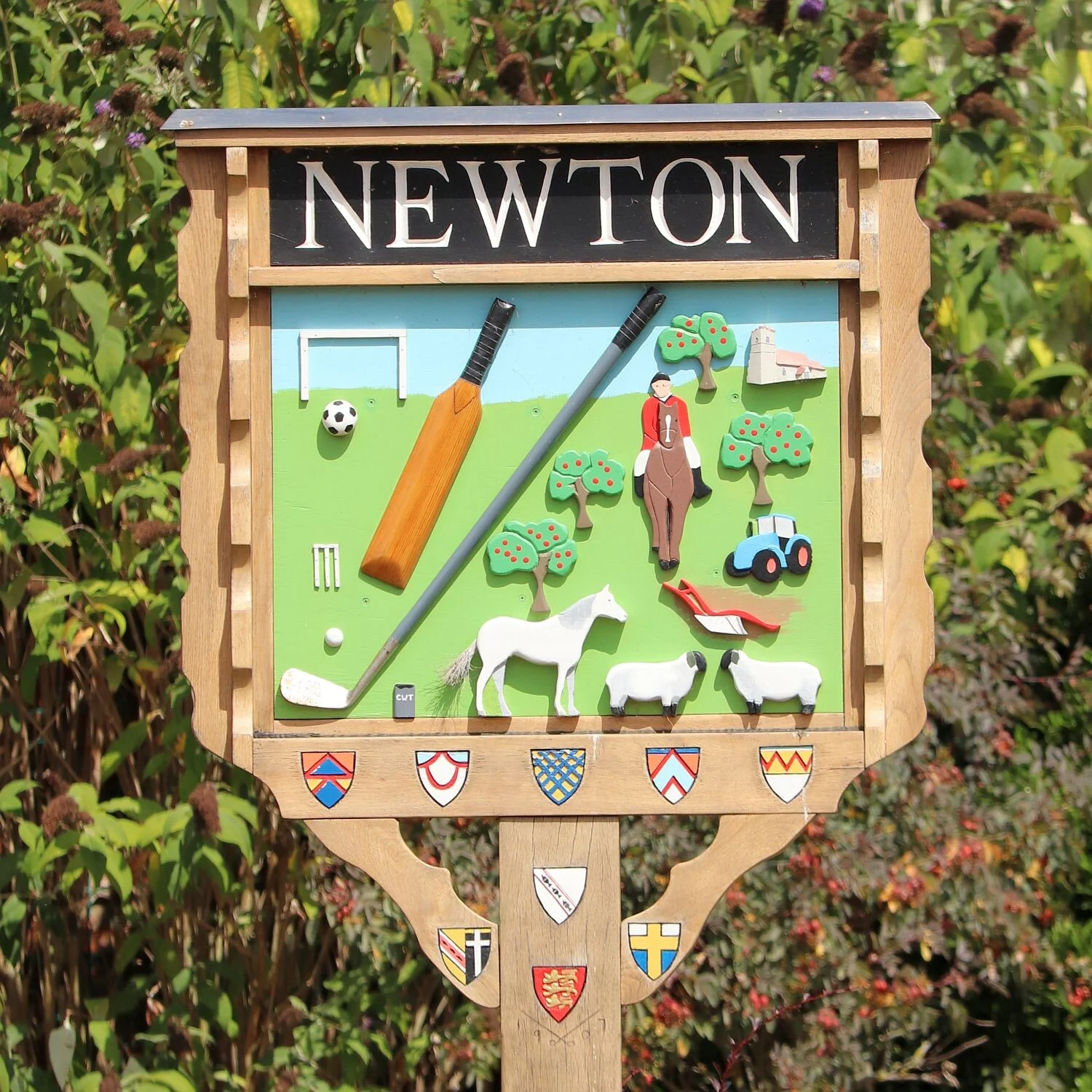
Newton Village Sign

Newton, also known as Newton Green to distinguish it from Nowton near Bury St Edmunds, and Old Newton near Stowmarket, is a small village and civil parish in Suffolk, England. Part of Babergh district, it is located on the A134 (Assington Road) between Sudbury and Colchester, around three miles from the former.

Newton was recorded in Domesday as "Niwetuna".

Church Road leads north off A134 towards Newton Hall and All Saints Church (both 1 km from the village centre).

Unusually, the village green to the south and west has been converted to a 9-hole common land course in 1907. It is one of the oldest golf clubs in Suffolk. Residents are entitled to membership of the local golf club, though are limited to using the holes on the village green and cannot use the clubhouse. The green is also a wildlife site.

The parish contains Alstrop Wood and part of the Edwardstone Woods SSSI, both of which are classified as ancient woodland. The small hamlet of Sackers Green is also within the parish.

The village previously had a school, but it was closed in 1938. The building is today used as the village hall.

== Present day ==
Village of the Year 2009-2010

The only pub in the Village is a 15th-century pub close to the golf course. The pub was renamed Saracens (formerly Saracens Head) in early 2010.

Several farms in the area, Hill Farm to the west and Jarvis Farm to the southeast.
