= Wenham Magna =

Village in Suffolk, England

Coordinates: 52.003714°N 1.014304°E

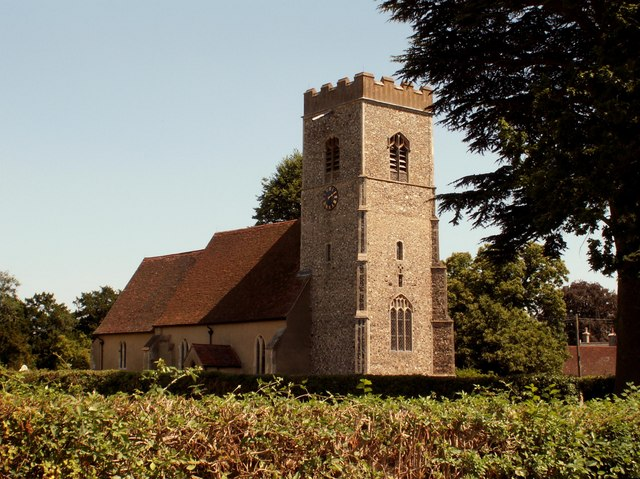
- St. John's Church

- Location within Suffolk
- Population: 150 (2005); 185 (2011)
- District: Babergh
- Shire county: Suffolk
- Region: East
- Country: England
- Sovereign state: United Kingdom
- Post town: Colchester
- Postcode district: CO7
- Police: Suffolk
- Fire: Suffolk
- Ambulance: East of England

Wenham Magna, also known as Great Wenham, is a village and a civil parish in the Babergh district of Suffolk in eastern England.

The parish also contains the hamlets of Gipsy Row, Vauxhall and Wenham Hill. In 2005 it had a population of 150, increasing to 185 at the 2011 Census.

Wenham Magna is the birthplace of Matthew Hopkins, the infamous witchfinder general. His father, James Hopkins, was vicar of St John's Church and the family held land in the area. James Hopkins appears to have been popular with his parishioners, one of whom left him money to purchase bibles for his children.

== Church of St John ==
The parish church of St John is a Grade II* listed building.

The chancel is 14th-century with a later, timber-framed, south porch. There is a 14th-century nave with north and south porches and a 15th-century west tower of flint with stone dressings. The rest of the church is plastered with only the stone windows exposed. The church has red plain tiled roofs.
