= Freston, Suffolk =

Village in Suffolk, England

Coordinates: 52°00′27″N 1°09′36″E

Freston
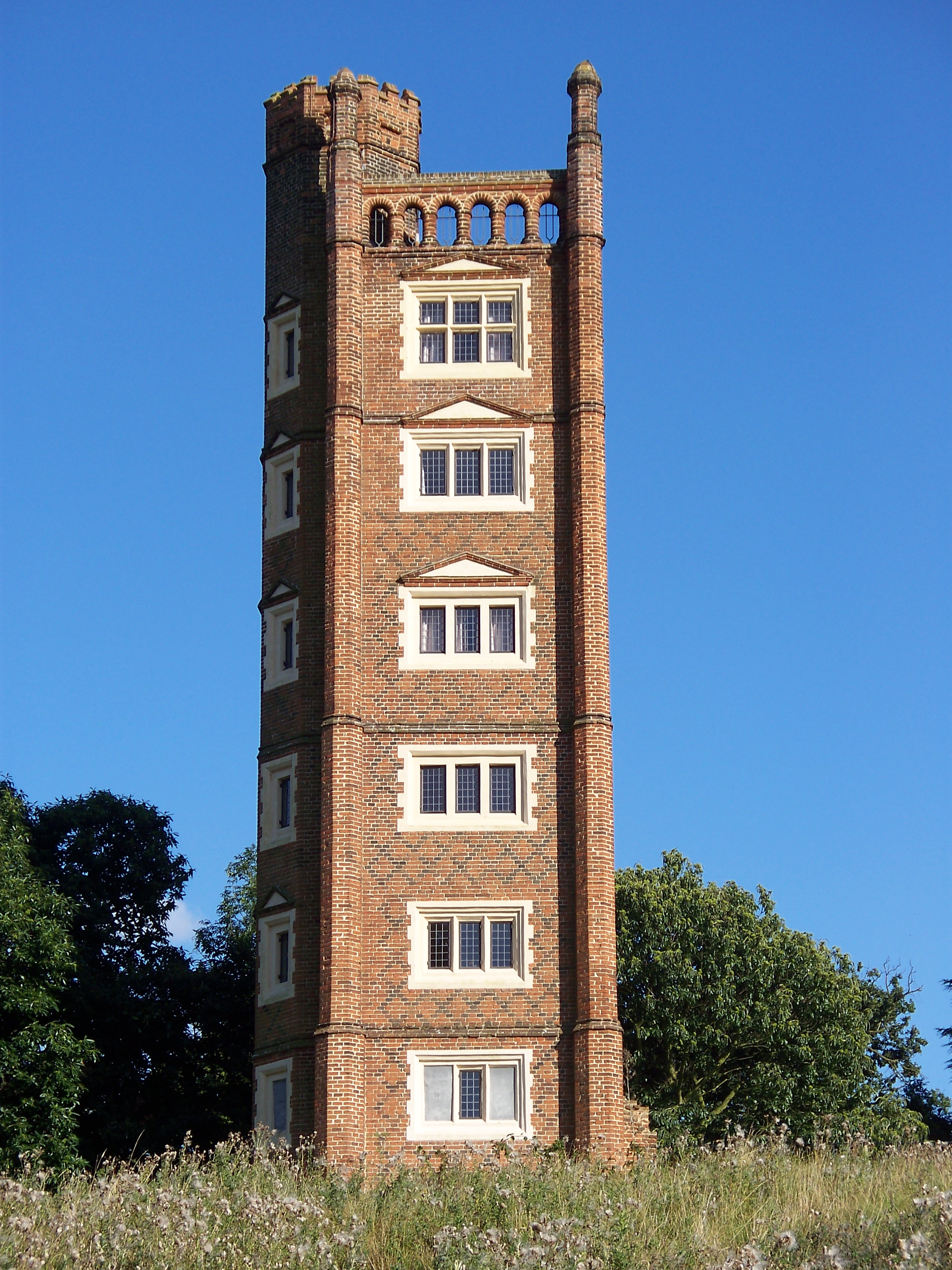
- Freston Tower

- Location within Suffolk
- Population: 120 (2011)
- OS grid reference: TM 17043 39037
- Civil parish: Freston
- District: Babergh
- Shire county: Suffolk
- Region: East
- Country: England
- Sovereign state: United Kingdom
- Post town: IPSWICH
- Postcode district: IP9
- Police: Suffolk
- Fire: Suffolk
- Ambulance: East of England
- UK Parliament: South Suffolk

Freston is a small village and civil parish in the Babergh district, in the county of Suffolk, England, located on the Shotley Peninsula, 4 miles south-east of Ipswich. In 2001, the parish had a population of 122, reducing slightly to 120 at the 2011 Census.

== History ==
=== Bubonic plague ===
Freston is notable as the location of the last outbreak of bubonic plague in England, in 1910. The centre of the outbreak was Latimer Cottages, where it is thought plague-bearing rats may have come ashore with smuggled goods. However, the diagnosis of plague has been disputed.

A Neolithic causewayed enclosure lies just south of the village.

== Amenities and places of interest ==
- St. Peter's Church
- The Freston Boot public house, which closed in 2010 and reopened in 2018
- Freston Wood
- Freston Tower, either a lookout tower or a folly

== Transport ==
For transport there is the B1456 road nearby.

== Notable residents ==
- William Latymer (1499–1583), evangelical clergyman, Dean of Peterborough from 1560. He was chaplain to Anne Boleyn
- Isaac Eastey (1627–1712), husband of Mary Eastey, who was executed during the Salem Witch Trials
- Clara Reeve (1729–1807), novelist best known for the Gothic novel The Old English Baron
- Foster Barham Zincke (1817–1893), clergyman, a traveller, and an antiquary

== Sources ==
- Carter, Tristan; Jackson, Nathaniel; Moir, Rose; Challinor, Dana; Diffey, Charlotte (2021). "The Freston causewayed enclosure: new research on the Early Neolithic of Eastern England (Suffolk)". Documenta Praehistorica. XLVIII: 118–141. doi:10.4312/dp.48.6.
