= Thomas Marshall (abbot of Colchester) =

English Roman Catholic monk and martyr

Blessed John Beche O.S.B.

Abbot of Colchester, Martyr
- Born: Thomas Marshall; Colchester, England
- Died: 1 December 1539 probably at the Abbey's gallows at Greenstead
- Honored in: Roman Catholic Church
- Beatified: 13 May 1895 by Pope Leo XIII
- Feast: 1 December
- Attributes: Bible

Thomas Marshall (the Blessed John Beche), also known as John Beche, (died 1 December 1539) was the last Abbot of Colchester Abbey.

== Life ==
Thomas Marshall, commonly known as John Beche, was a member of the Colchester Beche family, who were a dynasty of renowned pewtersmiths in the town. He was educated at Oxford University (probably Gloucester Hall now Worcester College) where he took his degree of Doctor of Divinity in 1515. He then became the twenty-sixth Abbot of St. Werburgh's, Chester (now Chester Cathedral) and went on to become Abbot of St. John the Baptist's, Colchester on 10 June 1530.

On 30 March 1534, Abbot Beche took his seat in the House of Lords. In that year, the Act of Supremacy was passed by which Henry VIII made himself Head of the Church in England, and on 7 July he, the Prior, and the community of 14, signed their agreement to the Act. Many clergymen considered the break with Rome of a temporary nature, and that it was possible to distinguish between the king as head of the Church in temporal matters, though not in matters spiritual.

The Abbot was a strong opponent of the King's new policy, and a friend and admirer of Thomas More and John Fisher. Following the execution of three Carthusian priors, Fisher and More during 1535, his expressions of reverence for them was reported to the authorities.

In November, 1538, Beche denied the legal right of Henry VIII's royal commission to confiscate his abbey. He was then committed to the Tower of London on a charge of treason; despite being discharged, he was rearrested and taken back to Colchester.

The Abbot's servant said that his master denied that the king could suppress the Abbey because it was above the yearly value of 300 marks specified in the statute. Other witnesses testified that Beche had said that God would "take vengeance for the putting down of these houses of religion", that Fisher and More "died like good men and it was pity of their deaths", and he claimed that the king had broken with the Catholic Church because he wanted to marry Anne Boleyn. Beche denied these charges but at his trial in Colchester, in November, 1539, he no longer pleaded against the charges. He was convicted and executed. The execution occurred on the Abbot's demesne lands, probably at the Abbey's gallows at Greenstead. His pectoral cross was rescued by the Mannock family of Giffords Hall, Stoke-by-Nayland, who entrusted it to Buckfast Abbey in Devon, where it still remains.

== Beatification ==
Pope Leo XIII decreed the beatification of Abbot John Beche on 13 May 1895. His feast is kept on 1 December in the diocese of Brentwood and by the English Benedictine Congregation.

== See also ==
- Hugh Faringdon, last Abbot of Reading Abbey
- Richard Whiting, last Abbot of Glastonbury Abbey
- Dissolution of the Monasteries
