= Gifford's Hall =

Gifford's Hall and Giffords Hall are frequently interchanged names for two historic buildings of similar periods in Suffolk, United Kingdom.

- Giffords Hall, Stoke-by-Nayland, a timber framed manor house in southern Suffolk with a brick gatehouse and famous for its hammerbeam roof.
- Gifford's Hall, Wickhambrook, an entirely timber framed manor house in northern Suffolk.
