= St John's Abbey, Colchester =

Monastery in Colchester, England

St John's Abbey
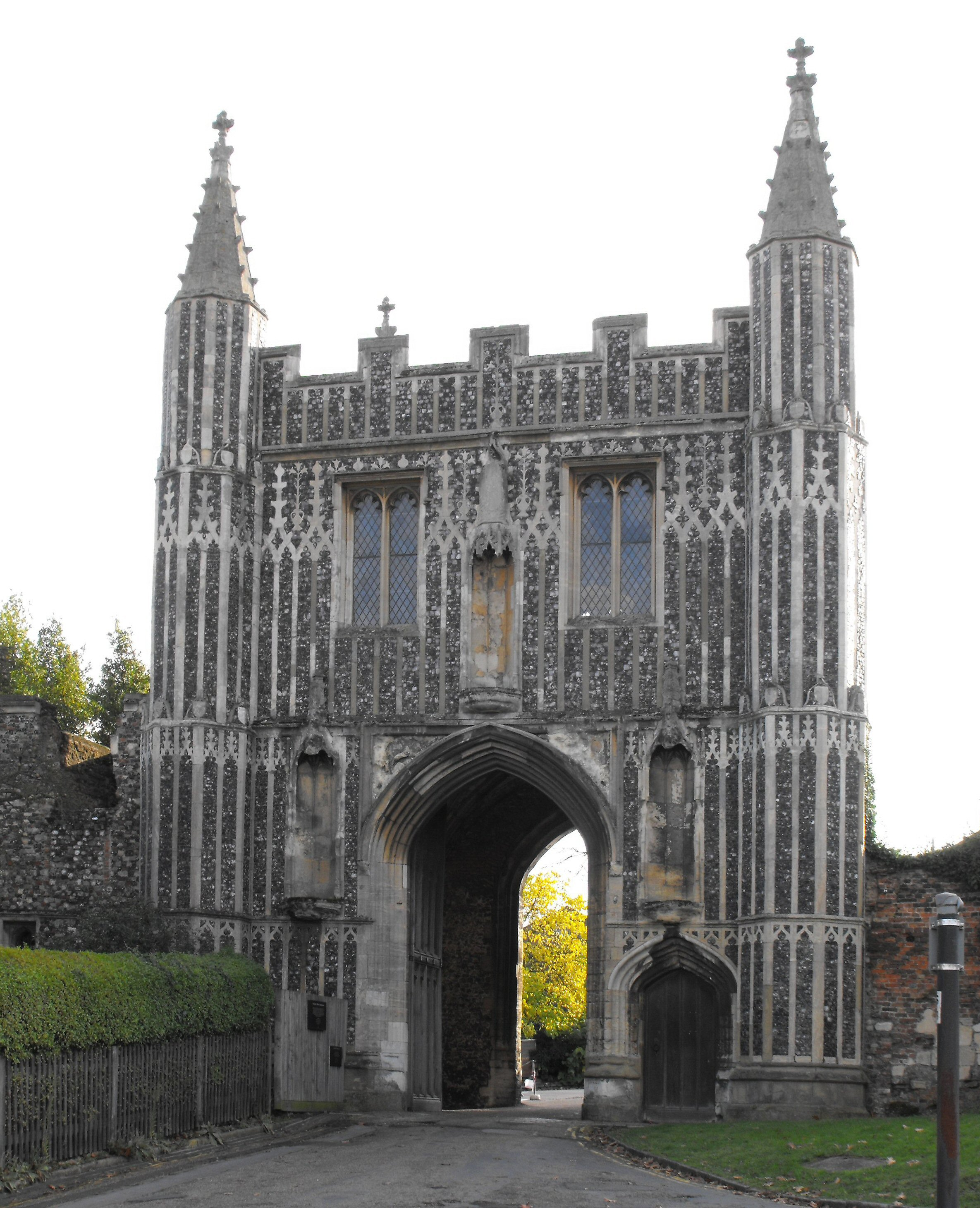
- Gatehouse of St John's Abbey
- Interactive map of St John's Abbey

Monastery information
- Other name: Colchester Abbey
- Order: Order of St Benedict
- Established: 1096
- Disestablished: 1539
- Dedication: St John the Baptist
- Controlled churches: St Giles

People
- Founder: Eudo Dapifer
- Important associated figures: Thomas Marshall, John Howard, 1st Duke of Norfolk

Architecture
- Status: Dissolved
- Functional status: Largely demolished
- Heritage designation: Grade I

Site
- Location: Colchester, Essex, United Kingdom
- Coordinates: 51°53′7.96″N 0°54′5.67″E
- Visible remains: Abbey Gate, Precinct Wall, St Giles Church
- Public access: yes

St John's Abbey, also called Colchester Abbey, was a Benedictine monastic institution in Colchester, Essex, founded in 1095. It was dissolved in 1539. Most of the abbey buildings were subsequently demolished to construct a large private house on the site, which was itself destroyed in fighting during the 1648 siege of Colchester. The only substantial remnant is the elaborate gatehouse, while the foundations of the abbey church were only rediscovered in 2010.

== History ==
=== Founding ===
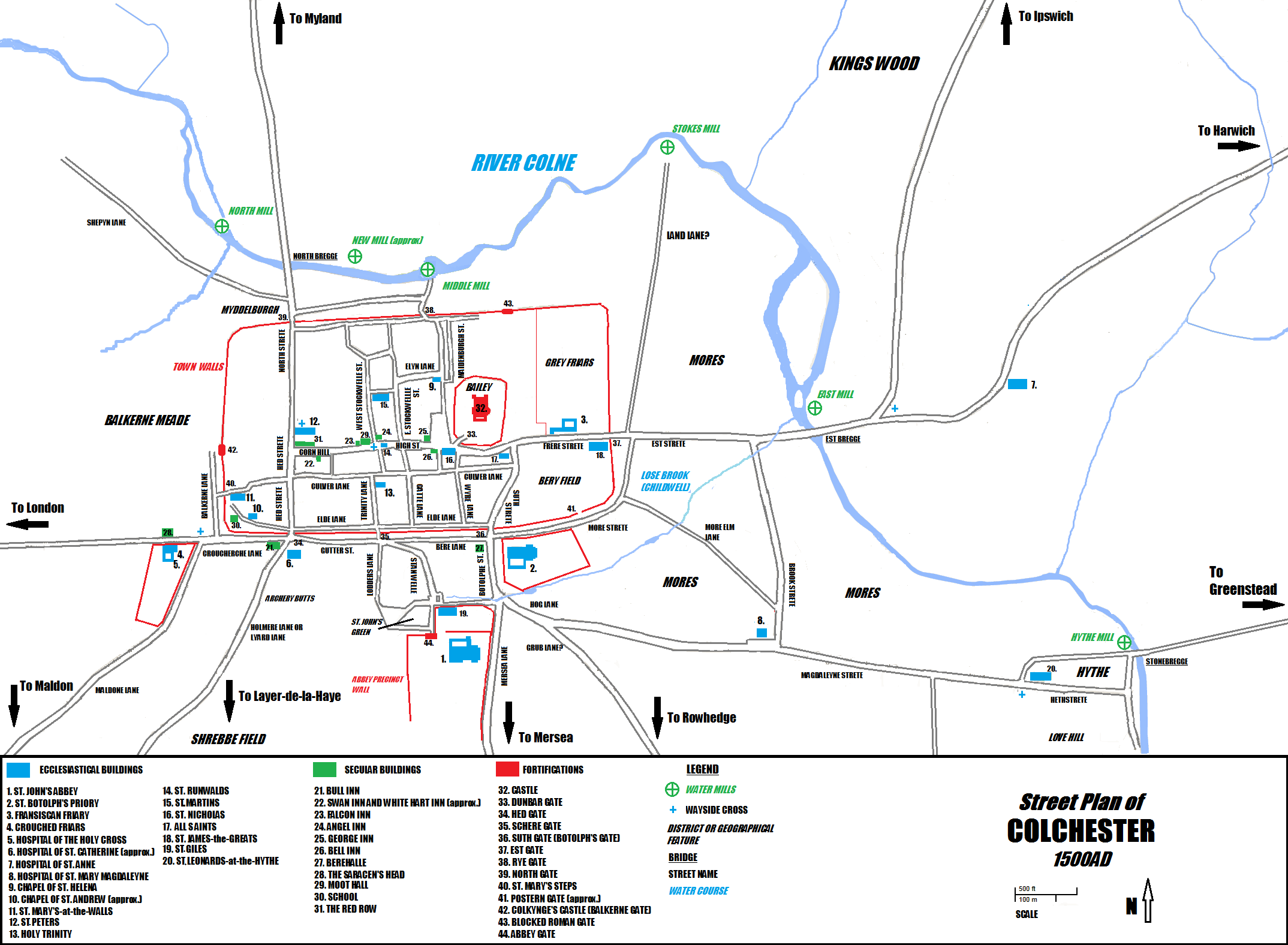
Colchester in 1500AD, showing the location of the Abbey of St John's

The site of the abbey, to the south of the walled part of the town near the road to Mersea Island, was originally the location of a Saxon church dedicated to either St John the Baptist or St John the Evangelist. This church was supposedly where "miraculous voices" could be heard. The Saxon church was excavated in the 1970s, and was revealed to be a three celled structure built from Roman rubble. Originally it was thought that the church began life as a Late Roman martyrium, although it was later concluded that this was an error based on the fact that the church had been built on a former Roman cemetery, rather than as part of it. The final priest of the church was a man called Siric or Sigeric at the time of the Domesday Survey. Following the Norman conquest of England in 1066 the town eventually came into the possession of Eudo Dapifer, steward of William I and King William II. Eudo claimed to have witnessed a miracle at St John's Church in 1095, and used this as an excuse to found a Benedictine monastery on the site. He obtained the support of the Bishop of London in 1096, and began work on the monastery to the north of the original church.

The outline of the building was marked on the ground on the 29 August 1096, and construction took place between 1096 and 1115, with Eudo himself supposedly laying the first stone. The abbey and its associated buildings would have been constructed out of Roman rubble quarried from the ruins of Roman Colchester, and lime kilns, used to create lime for mortar from baking oyster shells, have been found which would have been used by the builders. As Eudo was a layman he had no authority to found an abbey, and so it was a priory in its early years.

The first attempt to populate the monastery came when the Bishop of Rochester sent two monks from his diocese to the town, but they subsequently returned and were replaced by a larger contingent under the leadership of a man called Ralph. Ralph negotiated with Eudo the extent of the monastery's authority in the town, becoming its first prior, although he and his monks later left after a dispute. Eudo despaired of the project, until he met with Abbot Stephen of York, who sent thirteen monks to Colchester from York, which roughly coincided with Pope Paschal II's granting of abbey status to the institution on 10 January 1104. The leader of the monks from York, Hugh, was ordained as the first abbot of St John's Abbey by the Bishop of London. Upon Eudo’s death in 1120 on his estate at Préaux in Normandy his remains were brought to England to be interred at the abbey on 28 February 1120.

=== Medieval history ===
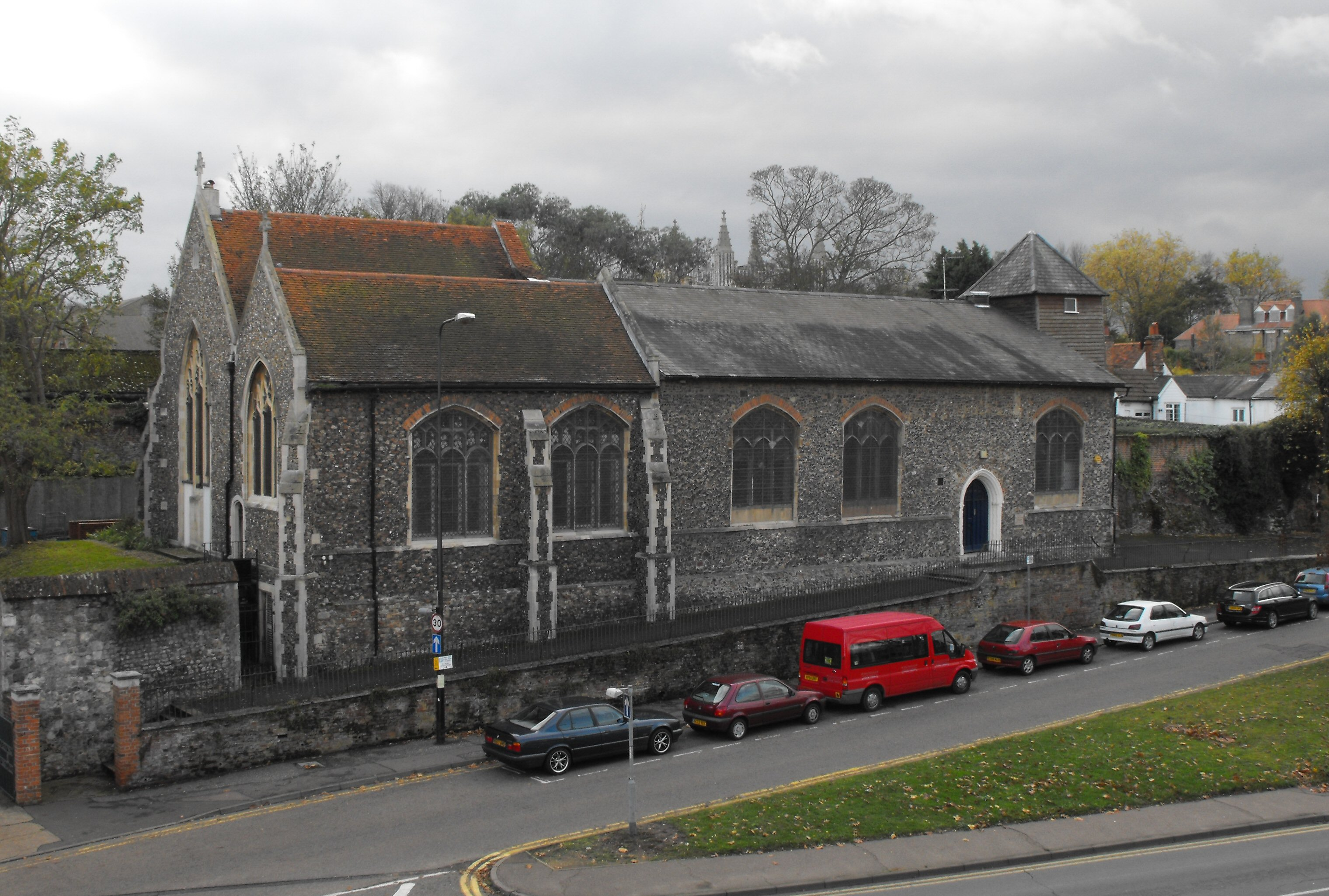
St Giles church, the parish church for the abbey's lay community. Heavily damaged during the 1648 Siege of Colchester.

The abbey suffered a disaster in its early years, when a large fire in 1133, which burned much of Colchester, severely affected the monastery. Following the destruction caused by the fire major reconstruction occurred. This involved landscaping much of the area around the abbey, moving the officine (offices) and habitula (monks' quarters) from the north side of the abbey to the south side, and rebuilding the abbey itself in a cruciform layout. As the abbey building was forbidden to lay worshippers a parish church, St Giles's Church, was built to serve them sometime between 1133 and 1171. This replaced St John's Church as the parish church, which was demolished down to its foundations and covered by the spoil from the landscaping. The Church of St Giles was built to the north of the abbey on the early lay burial ground, which included many graves lined with Roman rubble.

Sometime around 1170 the monastery received a vial of St Thomas Becket's blood from a monk called Ralph, who had once stayed at St John's Abbey during Becket's exile, and who had been present at Becket's murder in Canterbury. Supposedly Ralph only caught a few drops of Becket's blood in the vial, but when he sent it to Colchester it was miraculously overflowing. This vial became the abbey's most treasured relic, with supernatural healing powers attributed to it. King Henry III gave the abbey 15 oaks for upgrading the building in 1235. The abbey was embroiled in long standing disputes with the townspeople of Colchester throughout the Thirteenth, Fourteenth and Fifteenth Centuries, as well as several sometimes violent confrontations with the Augustinian convent of St Botolph's Priory which stood across the road from it.

In 1253, following long standing dispute over access to the free warren in West Donyland, to the south of the town, and the extent of the abbot's jurisdiction, a group of forty Colchester men attacked and destroyed the abbey's gallows and tumbrels at Greenstead to the East of the town, before cutting the ropes of the abbey’s ships at Brightlingsea. By 1255 these particular disagreements were settled, although in 1270 the king had to order the abbot to desist from distraining the Colchester men in matters of trespass of bread and ale, as it was outside of his jurisdiction. An anti-abbey riot broke out at the Midsummers Fair in 1272 on St John's Green outside of the abbey, and the following day the monks showed the Colchester coroner a dead body on the Green, purportedly one of their number killed by the townspeople. The subsequent investigation, however, found that the body was of a criminal taken down from the town gallows and placed on the Green by the monks in an attempt to defame the burgesses of Colchester. In 1310 an episcopal visit by Bishop Baldock found the abbey's monks had fallen slack in observing the rules regarding the periods of silence, abstinence from consuming meat (except in times of illness) and stabilitas (which stated that Benedictine monks may not move from their monastery to other ones).

The abbey found itself in trouble with the Crown in 1346, when a French prisoner, Berengar de Monte Alto, said to be the archdeacon of Paris, who had been captured at the Battle of Crécy by the English was sold in England for £50. He came into the possession of the abbot, who sold him in London, in direct defiance of the king's writ ordering his detention. In the winter of 1348-49 the Black Death struck the town, killing up to 1,500 people including the abbot and prior of St John's Abbey by the time it began to die down in August 1349. The abbey had pleaded poverty in the 14th century in order abstain from obligations to the King. A conflict arose with the nearby St Botolph's Priory, reported by the abbot to the pope, that the canons of St Botolph's, with two hundred supporters, attacked a monk of the abbey called Thomas Stuckele, whilst laying siege to the abbey. Some of them had forced their way inside, and injured the abbot and convent. The cause of the riot is not stated, but it may have arisen through a dispute about a pension out of the church of St Peter's, in Colchester, which was settled the following year.

The abbey suffered attacks from rebels during the Peasants' Revolt of 1381. The rebels who had assembled in Colchester had marched south to join Wat Tyler on the 14 June, whilst those who stayed behind attacked the town's Moot Hall and St John's Abbey on 15 and 16 June, forcing the law courts to shut for five weeks, and carrying off the court rolls of the abbey. Following the attack by the disgruntled rebels on the abbey its walls and gatehouse were strengthened. Further conflict involving St John's occurred when twelve armed horsemen from the abbey were involved in a fight with townspeople outside of Colkynge's Castle (modern Balkerne Gate on the western walls of Colchester) in 1391 over grazing rights to the meadows in the area. The following year in 1392 the abbot and his supporters got into a fight with his own monks, which spilled over onto St John's Green outside of the abbey gate.

In 1396, a monk of the abbey, John Colschestre was appointed bishop of Orkney by Pope Boniface IX, who on 25 February 1399 also granted the abbots of Colchester the use of the mitre and permission to gives solemn blessings at the end of mass and vespers. However the abbot during this time was frequently reprimanded for mismanagement of the abbey. In 1404 the abbot, alongside other leading Colcestrians and the abbot of St Osyth's Priory, were charged with being part of an earlier conspiracy to put the deposed Richard II back on Henry IV's throne. Although the abbot was acquitted in 1405, the case led to several leading burgesses of Colchester taking legal actions against him, all of which were resolved by 1415. King Henry V later censured the abbey for building a tower in defence of the monastery on Royal land. In 1429 and 1430, during a dispute with the townsfolk over the ownership of the Hythe water mill at Colchester's port, the abbot of St John's called the town a nest of Lollards, intending it as an insult, and claimed that the town owed St John's £228 in arrears over payments for the abbey infirmary. However it was the abbot who had to pay arrears for failing alongside his predecessors of the last 130 years to find a chaplain to celebrate mass on three days in each week in St Helen's chapel in the town, something they should have done in accordance with a judgment of 1290.

The abbey, which harboured strong pro-Plantagenet feelings, became embroiled in the politics surrounding the Wars of the Roses. In the 1460s the abbey had close links with John Howard, 1st Duke of Norfolk, Constable of Colchester Castle and a supporter of the Yorkist cause. Howard interfered with the abbatial elections following the death of Abbot Ardeley in 1464, helping John Canon to win the election. Howard then appears to have interfered again in support of Abbot Stansted's election following Canon's death in 1464, both suspecting of being pro-Yorkist. During the brief restoration of the House of Lancaster in 1470–71 Howard took advantage of the abbey's charter-enshrined sanctuary status by taking refuge there. Richard III had visited Colchester several times in the 15th century, in 1467–68, staying at the pro-Yorkist St John's Abbey each time. Following the Plantagenet defeat at the Battle of Bosworth Field the abbey provided a sanctuary for Yorkists, including briefly Viscount Lovell and perhaps also Richard of Shrewsbury, Duke of York. The abbey's sympathies were remembered in the early Tudor period by Edward IV and Richard III's mother Cecily Neville who left a large sum to the abbey in her will.

=== Dissolution ===
Following the Tudor victory in the Wars of the Roses King Henry VII appears to have viewed the abbey with suspicion, although he stayed there during his visit to Colchester. Catherine of Aragon also stayed at the abbey during her visit to the town in 1515. Following Henry VIII's divorce of Catherine, he began the Dissolution of the Monasteries in 1536. Already in 1534 schisms within the abbey between supporters of the king and detractors, although the abbey survived the initial dissolutions thanks to the intervention of Thomas Audley, Lord Keeper of the Great Seal. However, St John's Abbey was dissolved in 1539, following the trial and execution of the abbey's last abbot, John Beche (alias Thomas Marshall). Abbot Beche had refused to hand the Abbey over to the king, and so was taken to the Tower of London before facing a trial in Colchester in front of a jury headed by the Earl of Essex. After being found guilty of treason he was hanged on his own demesne lands at Colchester on 1 December 1539. His pectoral cross was rescued by the Mannock Family of Stoke-by-Nayland in Suffolk, who gave it to Buckfast Abbey in Devon. The abbey monks were granted small pensions, whilst the abbey itself fell into the hands of the crown.

=== Post-dissolution ===
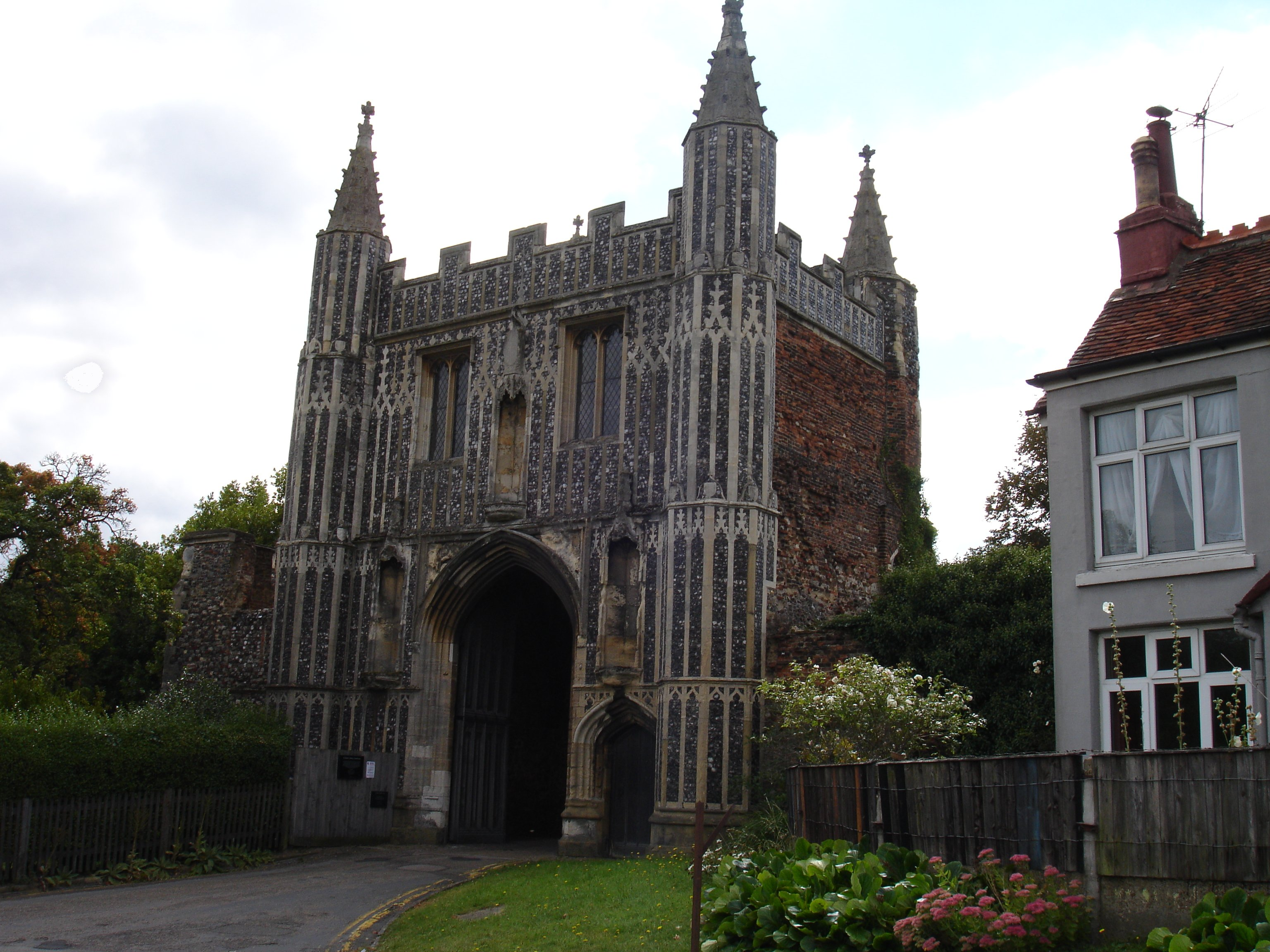
The gatehouse of St John's Abbey, Colchester

Following the dissolution the abbey was leased by the crown to Sir Thomas Darcy, before eventually being bought by the Lucas Family in 1548. The abbey church was slowly demolished during the late 16th century and early 17th century, with the Lucas family building a large manor house in its grounds, retaining the precinct wall with its large abbey gate around the old grounds. St Giles's Church was retained as a parish church, housing the tombs of the Lucas family. Fragments of the abbey were reused in Bourne Mill (built 1591), whilst other fragments of stone from the church are scattered around the former grounds. Depictions of Colchester on John Speed's map of 1607 show the Lucas mansion in the southern part of the abbey grounds and what appears to be the central tower of the abbey with its lantern window on top still standing. In 1648, during the English Civil War, Colchester was seized by Royalist forces and besieged by the Parliamentarians. Sir Charles Lucas, one of the Royalist commanders, was a native of the Lucas manor in the abbey grounds. As part of the siege of the town the Parliamentarians ejected the Royalist troops from the abbey grounds after a long fight, destroying the Lucas mansion, St Giles's Church, parts of the old abbey precinct walls and parts of the abbey gate in the process.

In 1860 the War Office bought the abbey grounds from the Baring family, and it became part of Colchester Garrison. The Abbey Fields, south of the old abbey precinct and once part of the garrison grounds, still bear the name of the abbey.

The abbey church building was rediscovered during excavations in 2010 by Colchester Archaeological Trust. In these excavations the church was found to have been much larger than expected at 90m long, longer than the nearby St Botolph's Priory.

== The monastic institution ==
=== The abbey church ===
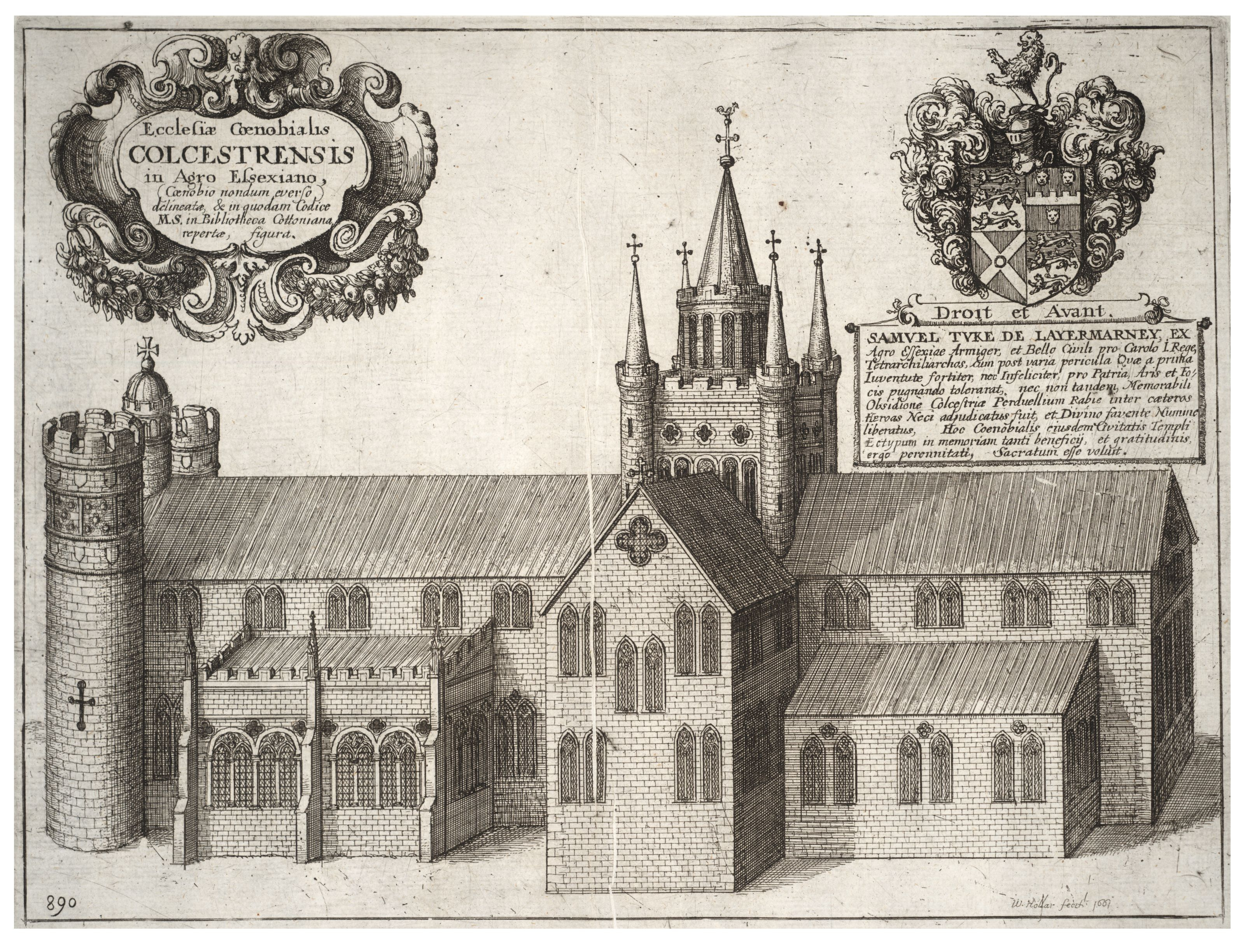
A mid-17th century depiction of the abbey church by Wenceslas Hollar, based on an earlier drawing.

The abbey church was rediscovered in 2010 but many of the associated buildings have yet to be identified archaeologically, although contemporary descriptions and images of the abbey have allowed some reconstruction of the church. The abbey church was cruciform in layout, with two western towers and a squat central tower over the central crossing of the transepts, topped by a large cylindrical roof lantern. It had about seven bays (pairs of arches on either side of the nave, and a least two chapels attached to the south side of the building. The church contained a clock, one of two in Medieval Colchester, the second being at St Leonards-at-the-Hythe. The church contained an image of The Blessed Virgin Mary, with a sanctuary lamp, and a relic consisting of a vial of Thomas Becket's blood. The abbey church and associated buildings, such as the abbot's residence and chapter house, were located within a walled precinct which enclosed an area of roughly 13 acres. Sections of this wall remain along Mersea Road, although large portions were pulled down in the 1970s. The precinct wall enclosed the site of the north, east and west sides, with the south side apparently open to the countryside. The main entrance into the precinct from St John's Green was the Abbey Gate, which still stands and is a Grade I listed building. The parish church of St Giles's Church, which served the lay community around the church, was located in its own precinct attached to the north of the main precinct. St Giles's was heavily damaged during fighting in the 1648 Siege of Colchester, but was rebuilt and is now Colchester's Mason centre.

The head of the abbey was an abbot, assisted by a prior. From 1399 the abbot was permitted to wear a mitre, and sat in the House of Lords. The seal of the abbey is circular, with a diameter of three inches, and has the following appearance: The obverse represents St John the Baptist seated in a canopied niche, holding in his left hand the Agnus Dei on a plaque, whilst pointing to it with his right hand. In smaller canopied niches on the left and right are Saints Peter and Paul. In the base is a shield of the arms of the abbey—a cross within a bordure, over all an escarbuncle of eight stavesfleury. The legend reads SIGILLUM COMUNE MONASTERII SANCTIIOHIS BAPTISTE COLCESTRIE. The reverse represents St John the Evangelist seated in a canopied niche, holding in his right hand a chalice with a dragon, and in his left hand a palm branch. In canopied niches to either side are angels. Outside these on either side is a penthouse, on which is an angel holding out a shield of arms; on the left those of France and England quartered, and on the right those of the abbey. In the base under an arch is an abbot kneeling, with figures in niches on each side. The legend on the reverse reads O MATRIS . . . ALNE IOHS CONSERBES OMESCCIB[UD] . . . ATQ . . . DS.

=== Possessions ===
The lands and endowments of the abbey were recorded and confirmed in several charters. The first charter from 1104 confirms the possession of the manors of Weeley and Pitsea, a four-day fair at the feast of St John at Colchester, the churches of Turnecruft, at Leatherhead in Surrey, and St Mary Woolchurch, in London, various other lands and tithes, and grants by other donors. In addition the charter granted that the abbey shall have the same liberties as Westminster. A second charter in 1119 confirms a further list of possessions, the principal additions being the manor of Mundon and the church of Nieweseles, in Barkway, Hertfordshire. A charter from the reign of William II confirms the grants made by Eudo to the abbey, and mentions the manors of Brightlingsea, Weeley and Great Hallingbury, and the churches of Lillechurch, St Mary Woolchurch, and Leatherhead. However the grants may have been partially revoked at a later date, as Brightlingsea and Hallingbury are not mentioned in the charters of Henry I.

The church of Lillechurch remained in the possession of the abbey until the reign of King Stephen, when it was exchanged for lands in East Donyland, to the south of Colchester. The chapel of St Helen at Colchester along with a fair of two days at the feast of the Invention of the Cross were granted to the abbey by Henry II. Other manors granted to the abbey included Wickham Skeith, in Suffolk, Greenstead manor and church (now part of Colchester), Little Bardfield, Ardleigh, Boxted, Berechurch (now part of Colchester), the churches of St Giles, St Leonard, St Nicholas and Holy Trinity in Colchester, East Donyland, Takeley, St Stephen Walbrook in London, Walkern in Hertfordshire, Hamerton in Huntingdonshire, Aldeburgh and Hemingstone in Suffolk, and St George, Norwich. The abbey also owned Bourne Mill, a water mill on a brook just to the south of Colchester.

A small cell of the abbey was founded at Writtle called Bedemannesberg by a monk called Robert, and Henry II confirmed the abbey's possession and granted various privileges, including the right to gather nuts in the forest round, under the condition that two monks should dwell perpetually in the hermitage to pray for the safety of the king and the souls of dead kings. A second cell existed at Snape Priory near Aldeburgh, which was granted to the abbey on the agreement that there should be a prior and monks, who should be under the obedience of the abbey and render to it a yearly pension of half a mark. The abbot was to visit the priory twice a year with twelve horses for a stay of four days, or more often in cases of necessity. A third institution nominally owned by the abbey was St Mary Magdalene's Hospital on the road between the walled part of Colchester and its port. This had also been founded by Eudo as a leper hospital at the behest of Henry I, to be maintained by a £6 grant from the abbey's manor at Brightlingsea. However, the rector of the hospital had to resort to petitioning Parliament in the early fourteenth century because of the abbot's heavy-handed attempts to control the hospital. At one point the abbot of St John's arrived to demand the charters and common seal of St Mary Magdalene's, and when he was refused these he threw the master, Simon de la Naylonde, and one William de Langham out of the building. In a later inquest into this and other abuses the abbot was found innocent.

At the time of the dissolution the plate of the abbey amounted to 2,244¼ ounces besides two mytors garnished with silver and gilte, small seade perles and counterfeete stones or glasses, lackinge parte of the garnisshinge.

=== List of abbots ===
A list of the abbots of St John's Abbey has survived:

- Hugh of York, the first abbot, 1104.
- Gilbert de Lungrill, c. 1104-1129.
- William de Scuri, c. 1129-1132.
- Hugh de Haya, c. 1132-1148.
- Gilbert de Wicham, c. 1148-1164.
- Walter Walensis, c. 1164-1179.
- Osbert, c. 1179-1195.
- Adam de Campes, c. 1195-1238.
- William de Wande, 1238-1245.
- William de Spaldwic, 1245-1272.
- Robert de Grenstede, elected 1272, died 1306.
- John de Bruges, elected 1306, died 1311.
- Walter de Huntingfeld, elected 1311.
- William de Glemham, elected 1326, died 1327.
- John de Wymondham, elected 1327, died 1349.
- Simon de Blyton, elected 1349, resigned 1353.
- Thomas Moveron, elected 1353.
- Simon, occurs 1358, died 1368.
- Thomas Stukelee, elected 1368, died 1369.
- Richard de Colne, elected 1369, died 1375.
- John Dedham, elected 1375, died 1377.
- William de Gritton, elected 1377, died 1380.
- Geoffrey Story or de Sancta Ositha, elected 1380, died 1405.
- Roger Best, elected 1405, died 1418.
- Robert Gryttone, elected 1418, died 1432.
- William Ardeley, elected 1432, died 1464.
- John Canon, elected 1464, died 1468.
- Walter Stansted, elected 1468, died 1497.
- William Lyndesey or Sprowton, elected 1498, died 1517.
- John Stoke, elected 1517, resigned 1523.
- Thomas Barton, elected 1523, died 1533.
- Thomas Marshall (alias John Beche), elected 1533, executed 1539. The last abbot.

=== Burials ===
- Eudo Dapifer and wife Rohais (daughter of Richard Fitz Gilbert)
- Sir Lawrence Raynsford (High sheriff of Essex (1465) and Wiltshire (1470))

== See also ==
- List of monasteries dissolved by Henry VIII of England
- History of Colchester
- Order of St Benedict
- Monastery
- Colchester churches

== Bibliography ==
- Houses of Benedictine monks: Abbey of Colchester, A History of the County of Essex: Volume 2 (1907), pp. 93–102.
- Anthony New. A Guide to the Abbeys of England And Wales, pp. 119–20. Constable.
