= Arthur Webb =

English cricketer

Personal information
- Full name: Arthur Stuart Webb
- Born: 6 August 1868; Bridge, Kent, England
- Died: 3 December 1952 (aged 84); Briton Ferry, Glamorgan, Wales
- Batting: Right-handed
- Bowling: Right-arm medium
- Relatives: George Webb (brother)

Domestic team information
- Years: Team
- 1895–1904: Hampshire
- 1912: Glamorgan

Career statistics
Competition	First-class
Matches	151
Runs scored	5,515
Batting average	21.54
100s/50s	2/28
Top score	162*
Balls bowled	1,821
Wickets	22
Bowling average	46.50
5 wickets in innings	–
10 wickets in match	–
Best bowling	2/18
Catches/stumpings	83/–
- Source: Cricinfo, 20 February 2010

Arthur Stuart Webb (6 August 1868 – 3 December 1952) was an English cricketer who made nearly 150 appearances in first-class cricket for Hampshire between 1895 and 1904. He later relocated to South Wales, where he was a prolific runscorer in club cricket and coached at Christ College, Brecon.

== Career with Hampshire ==
Webb was born at Bridge in Kent in August 1868, where his father, James, was a publican who ran The White Horse. His mother, Harriet, came from Newmarket in Suffolk. Webb made his debut in first-class cricket for Hampshire against Essex at Leyton in the 1895 County Championship, with him appearing twice more in 1895. He established himself in the Hampshire team in 1896, making fifteen appearances in the County Championship, as well as appearing against the touring Australians at Southampton. Webb scored his maiden first-class century the following season, making 111 against Sussex, which accounted for over half of Hampshire's runs in their first innings of 218 all out. His sixteen first-class appearances in 1897 yielded 584 runs at an average of 20.85; it was in 1897 that his native county, Kent, made an unsuccessful attempt to sign Webb.

His batting average dropped to 12.25 from eighteen appearances in 1898, but improved over the following seasons. In 1899, he scored 640 runs at an average of 23.70 from sixteen matches, while in 1900 he scored 830 runs at an average of 25.93 from seventeen matches. His improved returns culminated in 1901, when he passed a thousand runs in a season for the only time, having scored 1,020 at an average of exactly 34 from nineteen matches. In 1902 and 1903, his effectiveness as a batsman decreased, with 458 and 197 runs respectively. He played his final season for Hampshire in 1904, a season in which he was granted a benefit against Surrey; it was in his benefit match that he made his career high score of 162 not out, having batted all day on the third day. The match was badly affected by rain, with no play being possible on the second day of the match. As a result, the ticket revenue raised for his benefit was restricted to £150. In 149 first-class appearances for Hampshire, he scored 5,475 runs at an average of 21.72, making two centuries and 28 half centuries. Lamenting on his batting in the 1904 season, the Southampton Observer and Hampshire News remarked "while he is batting Webb never looks like getting out, but he does get out all too often". Besides playing first-class cricket for Hampshire, Webb made one appearance in 1904 for the Players of the South against the Gentlemen of England at Bournemouth.

== Move to Wales ==
Webb moved to South Wales after the conclusion of his Hampshire career, where he played club cricket for Hill's Plymouth Cricket Club in Merthyr Tydfil, and for the Briton Ferry steelworks team, for whom he was also their groundsman. He also played club cricket for Llanelli and Panteg. His prolific run scoring saw him play minor counties cricket for Glamorgan in June 1912, with a single appearance in the Minor Counties Championship. In the same month, he made a final appearance in first-class cricket when he played for the South Wales cricket team against the touring South Africans at Swansea.

During the First World War, Webb served in the Sportsmen's Battalions (which formed part of the Royal Fusiliers); his two sons served on the Western Front, with both being killed in action. After the war, he returned to South Wales, where he coached at Christ College, Brecon. He continued as groundsman at Briton Ferry into the 1930s, before his retirement in May 1940. During his time with Briton Ferry, he coached the future Test cricketer Cyril Walters. He was appointed Glamorgan's assistant coach in the 1930s. Webb died in Briton Ferry on 3 December 1952; his wife, Ethel, predeceased him by nearly fifteen years. His brother, George, was also a first-class cricketer.
