= Snape Priory =

Monastery in Suffolk, England

Coordinates: 52.168379°N 1.493951°E

Snape Priory was a priory in Suffolk, England. It was founded as a cell of the Benedictine St John's Abbey, Colchester in Essex.

Cardinal Wolsey obtained a Papal Bull for the suppression of this house in 1527–28, towards his foundation of The King's School, Ipswich. After Wolsey's attainder and fall, the priory site and its possessions were granted to Thomas, Duke of Norfolk in 1532.
