= George Webb (cricketer) =

English cricketer (1857–1931)

Personal information
- Full name: George William Webb
- Born: 23 October 1857; Derringstone, Barham, Kent
- Died: 26 December 1931 (aged 74); Stoke-by-Nayland, Suffolk
- Batting: Right-handed
- Bowling: Right-arm fast-medium
- Role: Bowler
- Relatives: Arthur Webb (brother); Fred Webb (brother)

Domestic team information
- Years: Team
- 1880–1892: Kent

Umpiring information
- Tests umpired: 3 (1912)

Career statistics
Competition	First-class
Matches	2
Runs scored	5
Batting average	5.00
100s/50s	0/0
Top score	5*
Balls bowled	134
Wickets	1
Bowling average	134.00
5 wickets in innings	0
10 wickets in match	0
Best bowling	1/75
Catches/stumpings	4/–
- Source: Carlaw, p.555, 19 December 2020 (Note: CricInfo has two separate George Webbs, both playing a single match for Kent, one born in 1857 and the other born in 1859. Derek Carlaw's research suggests that these are the same person. CricketArchive has only one George Webb, born in 1857, playing two matches for Kent.)

George William Webb (23 October 1857 – 26 December 1931) was an English professional cricketer, umpire and cricket coach. Webb played in two first-class cricket matches for Kent County Cricket Club.

== Early life ==
Webb was born at Derringstone, part of Barham in Kent in 1857. His father, James, was a publican who ran The White Horse in nearby Bridge. His mother, Harriet, came from Newmarket in Suffolk.

== Cricket career ==
After playing for Kent Colts in 1879, Webb made his first-class debut for the county in 1880 against Sussex. He was employed as a professional cricketer and coach throughout the 1880s, working at locations such as Westminster School, Croome Court and Oxford University and by the early 1890s was working at Tonbridge School and playing for Tonbridge Cricket Club. After a good performance for a team of professionals against the Gentlemen of Kent in 1892, he made his second and final first-class appearance for Kent, taking a single wicket against Somerset at Taunton. After the establishment of the Tonbridge Nursery in 1897, Webb was employed as a coach at the Nursery until 1900.

Webb stood as an umpire between 1883 and 1913, umpiring Oxford University matches until 1905 when he umpired county cricket matches. He umpired 133 first-class matches in total, and stood in three Test matches during the 1912 Triangular Tournament. He also operated a sport outfitters shop in Tonbridge from the 1890s.

== Family ==
Webb's brother, Arthur Webb, almost eleven years his junior, played for Hampshire between 1895 and 1904, scoring over 5,000 runs in 49 first-class matches. He later played as an amateur for Glamorgan in the Minor Counties Championship. Another brother Fred Webb was a well known jockey, winning the Epsom Derby on Doncaster in 1873 after the original jockey engaged was found to be drunk before the race. He won many other significant races and later had a distinguished career as a trainer.

Webb married Margaret Redfern in 1894; the couple had two daughters. He died in 1931 at Stoke-by-Nayland in Suffolk aged 74.

== Bibliography ==
- Carlaw, Derek (2020). Kent County Cricketers, A to Z: Part One (1806–1914) (PDF). Cardiff: ACS.
