= Withermarsh Green =

Village in Suffolk, England

Coordinates: 51.995056°N 0.92635964°E

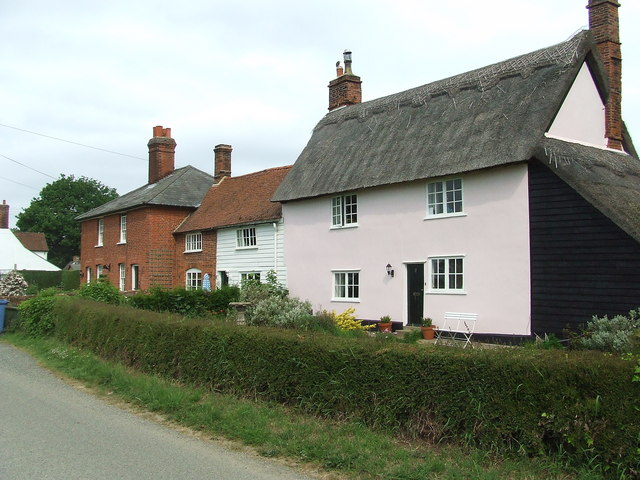

- Location within Suffolk
- Civil parish: Stoke-by-Nayland
- District: Babergh
- Shire county: Suffolk
- Region: East
- Country: England
- Sovereign state: United Kingdom
- Police: Suffolk
- Fire: Suffolk
- Ambulance: East of England

Withermarsh Green is a village in the civil parish of Stoke-by-Nayland, in the Babergh district, in the county of Suffolk, England. It is located near the villages of Stoke-by-Nayland and Shelley. Withermarsh Green has a recusant Catholic chapel called Our Lady Immaculate and St Edmund. The current situation of Withermarsh green is a church with Fr Henry Whisenant as its current priest. It has been there since August 2020.

== History ==
The name "Withermarsh" means 'the quivering marsh' or 'the quaking bog'. Withermarsh was recorded in Ælfflæd's will of 1000–1002 as "Wifærmyrsc" and "Hwifermirsce". Withermarsh Green was recorded in the Domesday Book as Withermers. Withermarsh may have been called "Wythermerested" in 1327. The Withermarsh family derive their name from Withermarsh.
