= Giffords Hall, Stoke-by-Nayland =

Giffords Hall
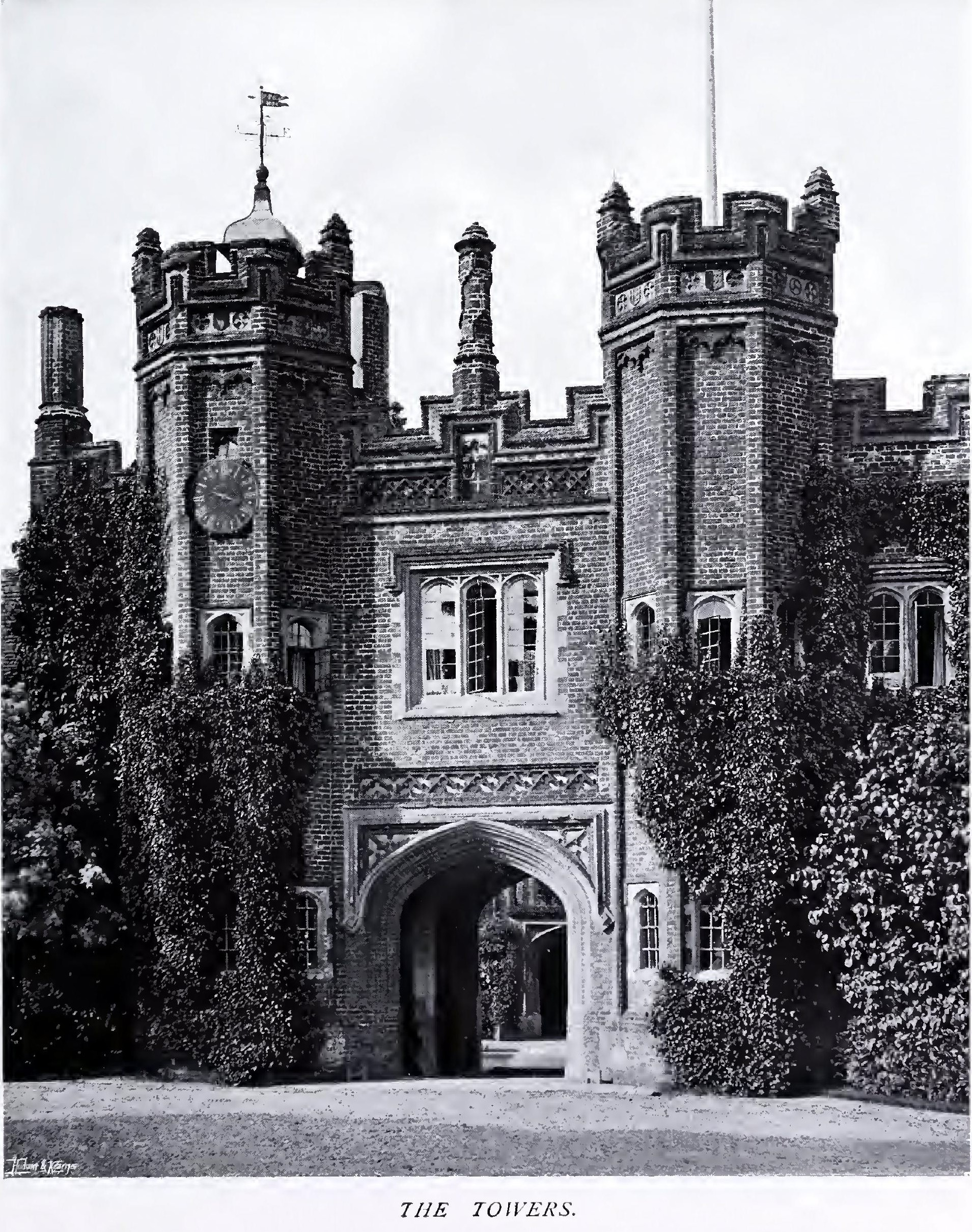
- Giffords Hall Gatehouse

Quick reference
Location within Suffolk
51°59′55″N 0°56′18″E
Type	Tudor Manor House
Location	Stoke-by-Nayland
History
Built for	Mannock family
Site notes
Area	Suffolk
Architectural style	Tudor
Listed Building – Grade I
Official name	Giffords Hall
Designated	10 Jan 1953
Reference no.	1283138

Giffords Hall (also called Gifford's Hall) is a Tudor manor house two miles north-east of Stoke-by-Nayland in Suffolk, England. It was described by Nikolaus Pevsner as "one of the loveliest houses of its date in England". It takes its name from the powerful Gifford family, who owned it in the 13th century, alongside the similarly named Gifford's Hall, Wickhambrook.

== History ==
Sir Bernard Burke reported in 1854 that the then owner of the house had records for leases of parts of the estate dating from the reign of Henry II.

=== The Constables ===
In 1216, Richard Constable began the now-ruinous chapel near the house, dedicating it to Saint Nicholas. Richard's son, William, would later "amply" endow the chapel.

=== The Giffords ===
The manor of Giffords would gain its name from the Gifford family, who had large landholdings in the area, when Peter Gifford came to hold the manor in the reign of Henry III.

=== The Mannocks ===
The Mannock family was said to have hailed originally from Denmark, flourishing under England's Danish Monarchs. Branches of the family had significant landholdings in Huntingdonshire, Cambridgeshire, Essex, and Suffolk, with one established in Stoke-by-Nayland from the time of Edward III.

Robert Mannock, alive in Edward's reign, was the great-grandfather of Philip Mannock, who purchased the Giffords manor in 1427 or 1428. The Mannock family and their successors would hold the house for nearly 500 years. Following Philip's purchase, the estate would be expanded, for instance acquiring the manor of Raven's Hall in 1464. remaining largely of only local importance. Philip may have built the main ranges of the house today, such as the Great Hall, at times (therefore incorrectly) called "King John's Banqueting Hall".

Philip would be succeeded by his son John, who would be succeeded by his son, George. George married Catherine, a daughter of Thomas Waldegrave of Smallbridge, Suffolk, and died on the 22 August 1541. His eldest son, William, succeeded him.

William would marry Audrie, a daughter of John Allington of Westley, Cambridgeshire and die on 8 July "6 Philip and Mary", i.e., 1558. His son, Francis, was five years old at the inquisition a year later. He would later marry Mary, a daughter of William Fitch of Little Canfield, Essex, and kinswoman of Benet Canfield. When he died on 2 November 1590, he had multiple daughters but only one son, William (d.1617), who was 34 at the time. William (d.1617) would marry Etheldred, a daughter of Ferdinando Parys of Linton and die on 15 March "15 James I", i.e., 1617. His eldest son, Francis (d.1634) succeeded him

Francis (d.1634) was created a baronet in 1627. He married Anna, daughter of William Saunders of Blofield, Norfolk, having three sons and a daughter with her, and dying on 20 November 1634. Francis's (d.1634) eldest son, Francis (d.1686), succeeded to the baronetcy on his father's death and married Dorothy, the daughter of Sir George Heneage of Hainton, where the Heneage family had been established since the 12th century, in 1636. They had four sons and five daughters, with one daughter, Mary, marrying John Petre, a son of the fourth son of the 2nd Baron Petre. Francis (d.1686) died on 26 April 1686 and was succeeded by his son, William (d.1713-14).

Major Francis Gresley, a former East India Company officer descended from the Gresley baronets, lived in the house after retiring in 1844. He was a member of the Amateur Photographic Association. The house and its then occupants were photographed several times by Calvert Richard Jones between c.1845 and c.1851.

== Architecture ==
The current house is a mainly 16th century house built for the Mannocks, incorporating older fabric, some of which may date to the Gifford family's ownership. Its hall has a hammerbeam roof and a 2-storey Tudor red brick gatehouse.

== Gallery ==
=== Exterior ===
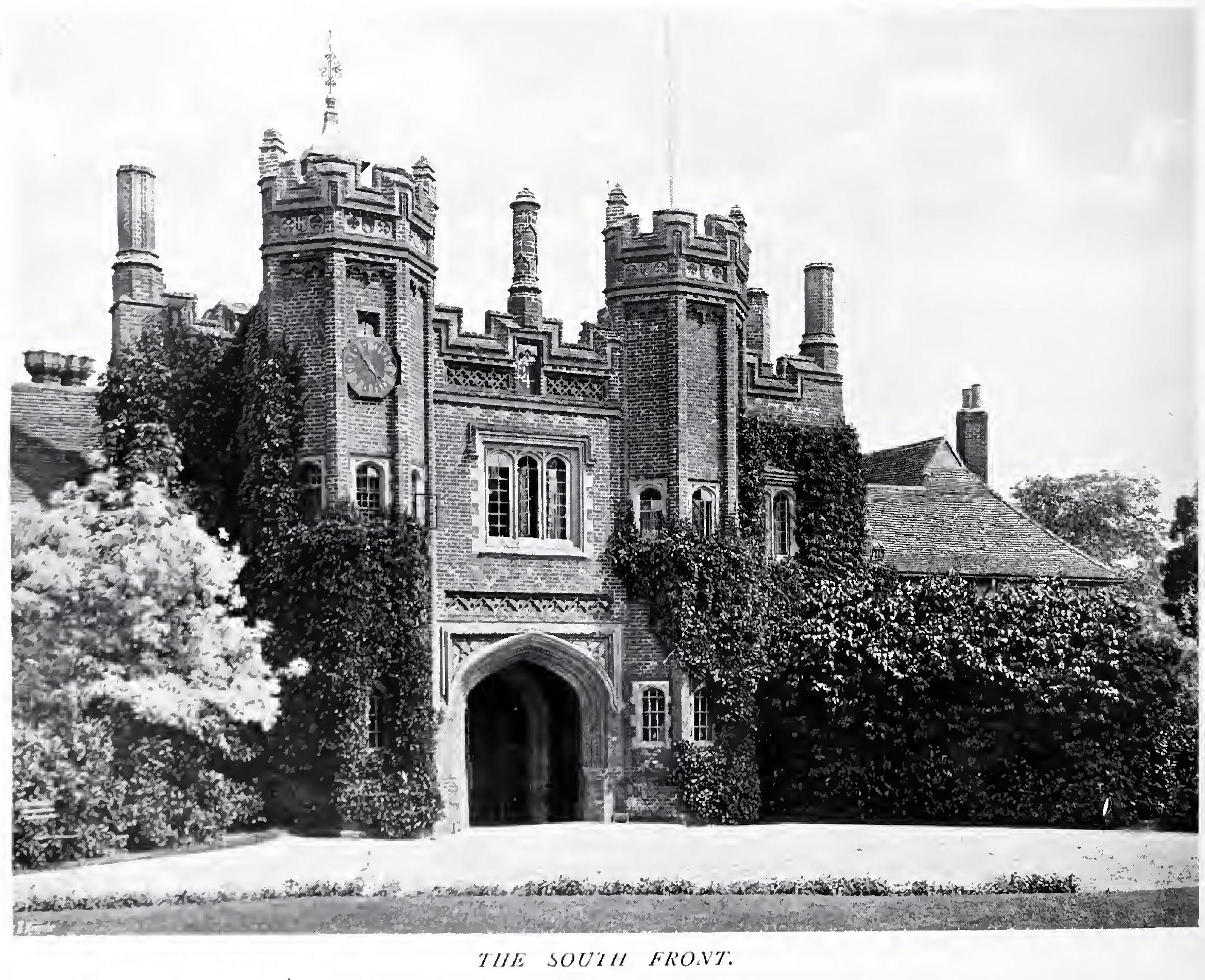
Giffords Hall gatehouse from the South-West, pre-1900

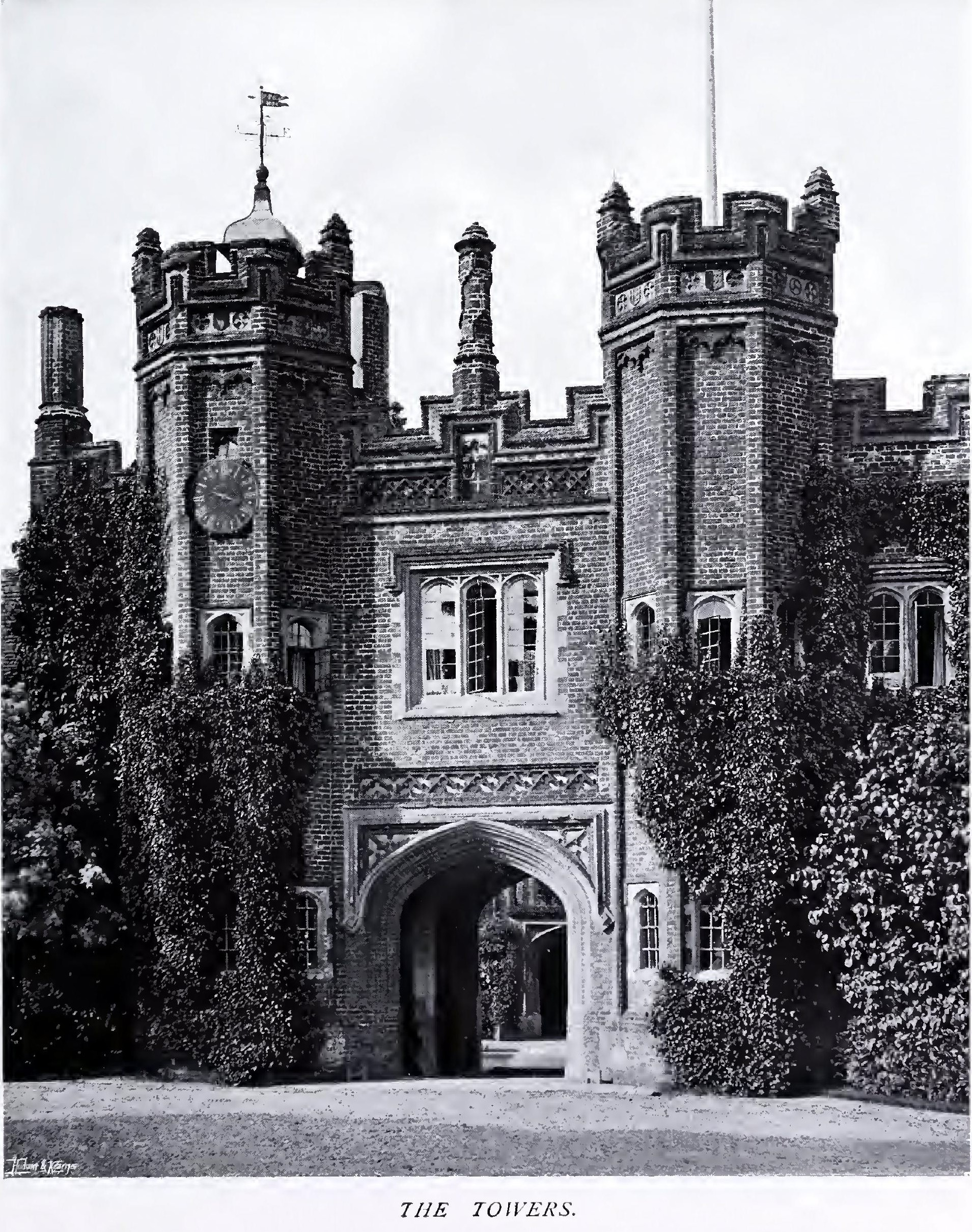
Giffords Hall gatehouse from the South-East, pre-1900

=== Courtyard and interior ===
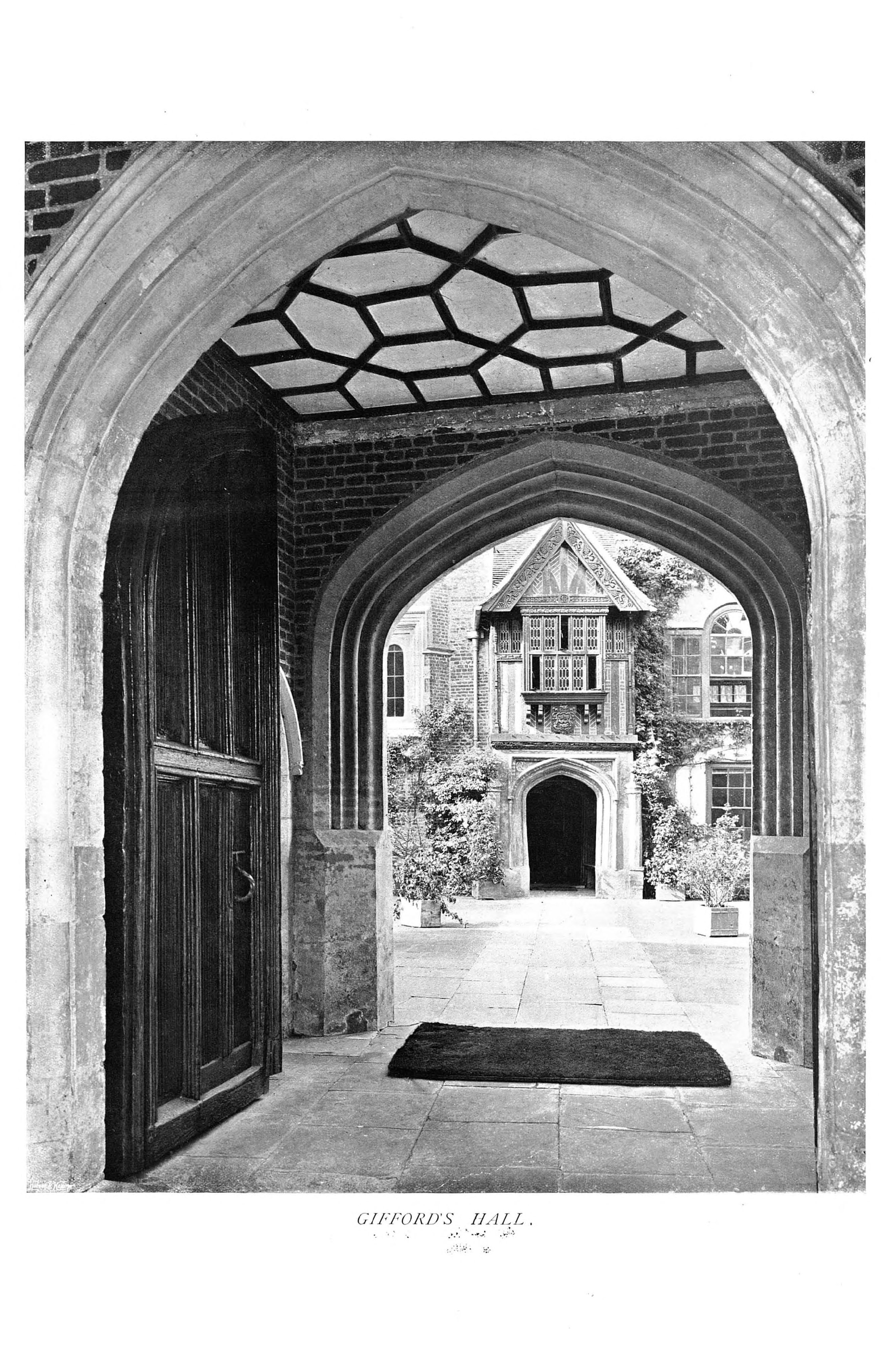
Giffords Hall courtyard and porch through the gatehouse

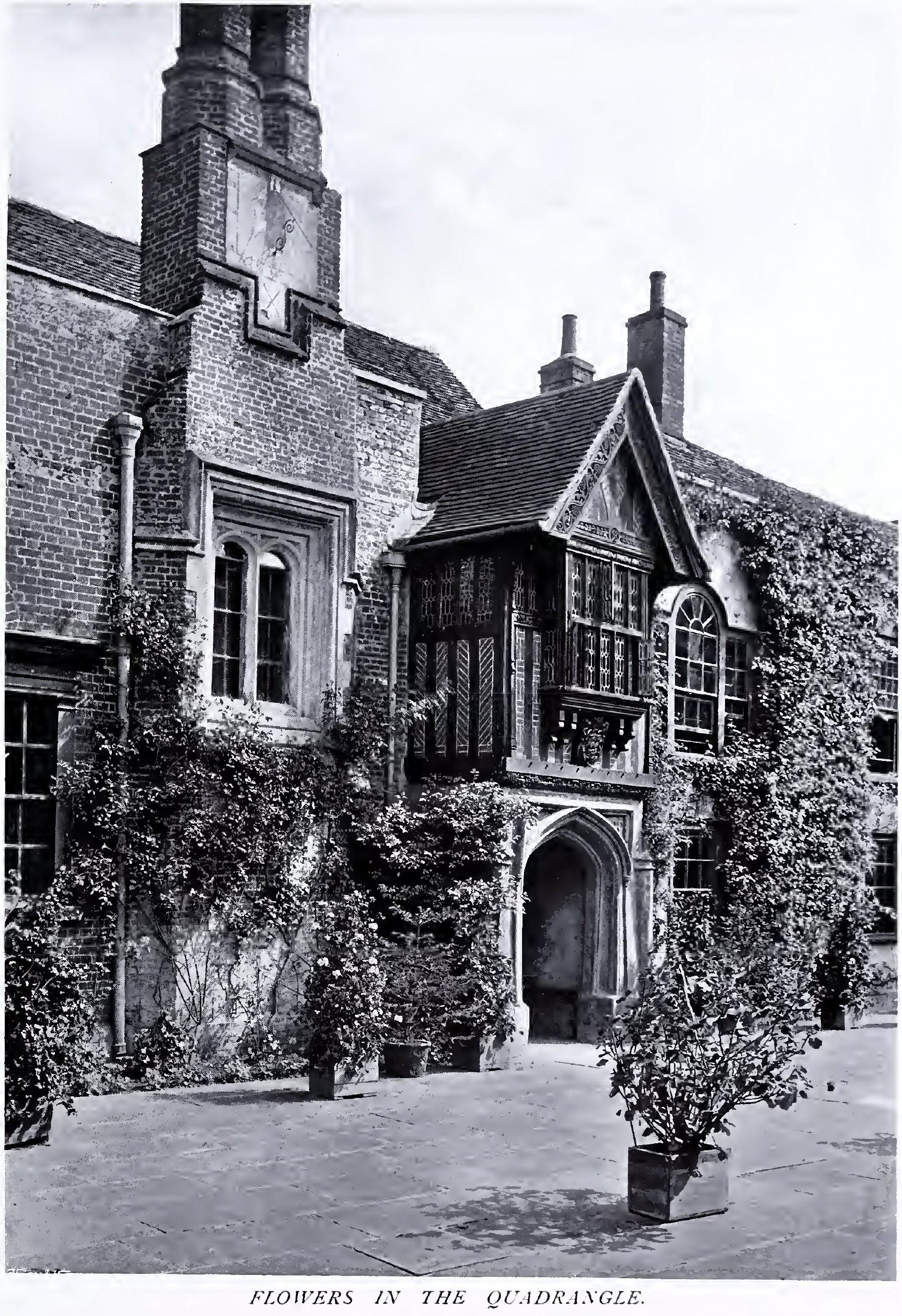
Giffords Hall courtyard and hall range from the West, pre-1900

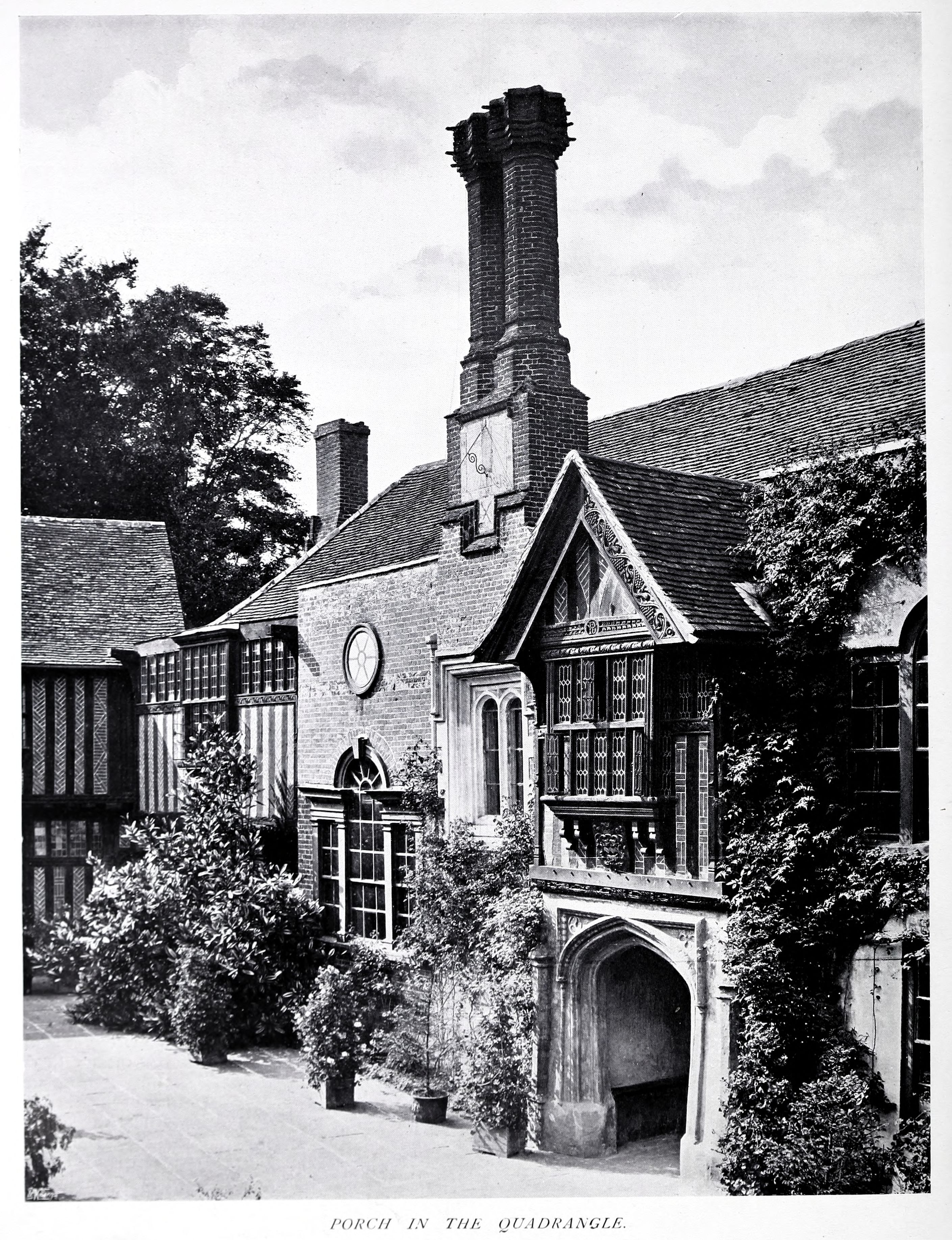
Giffords Hall courtyard and hall range from the East

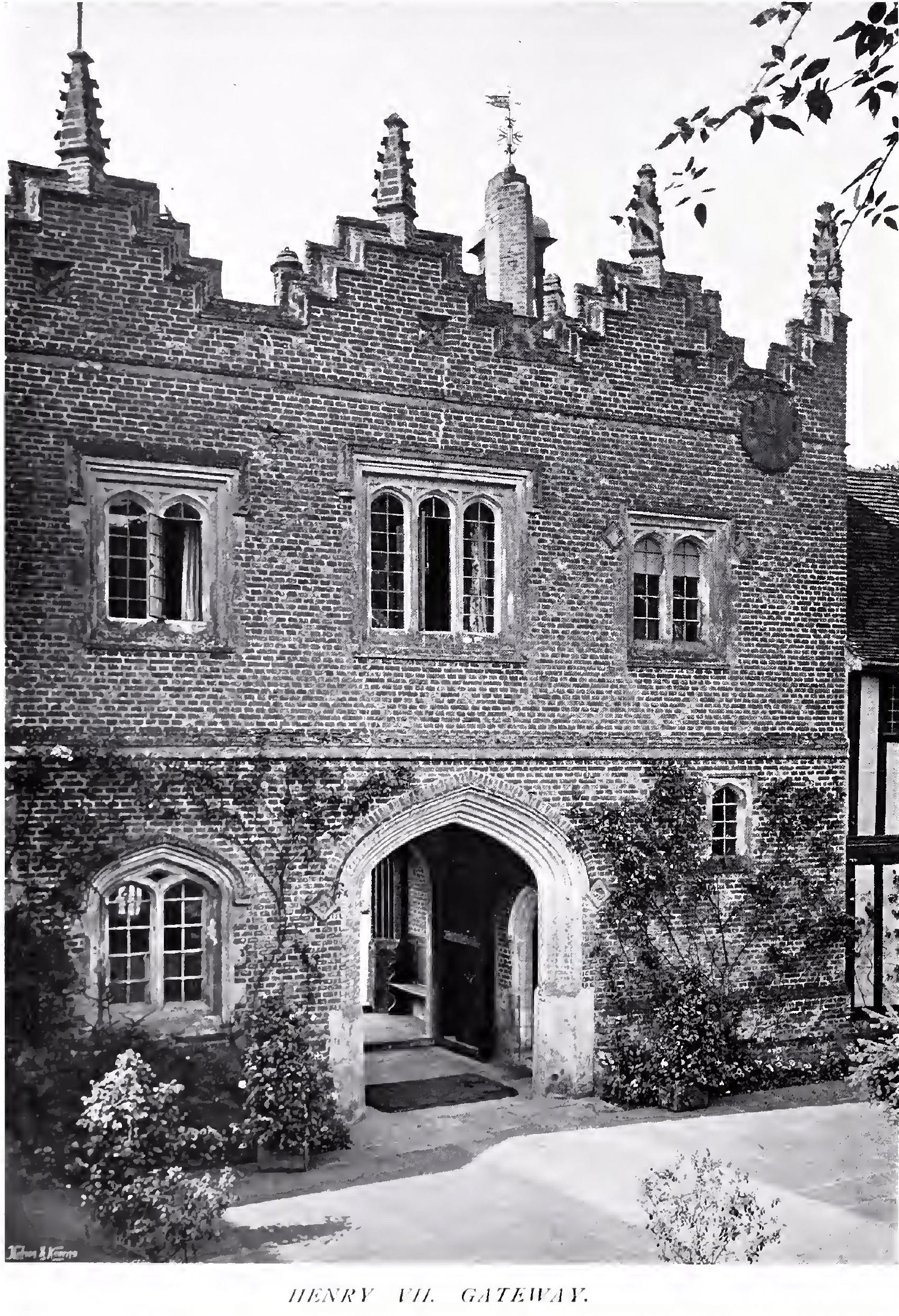
Giffords Hall gatehouse's North façade from the courtyard, pre-1900

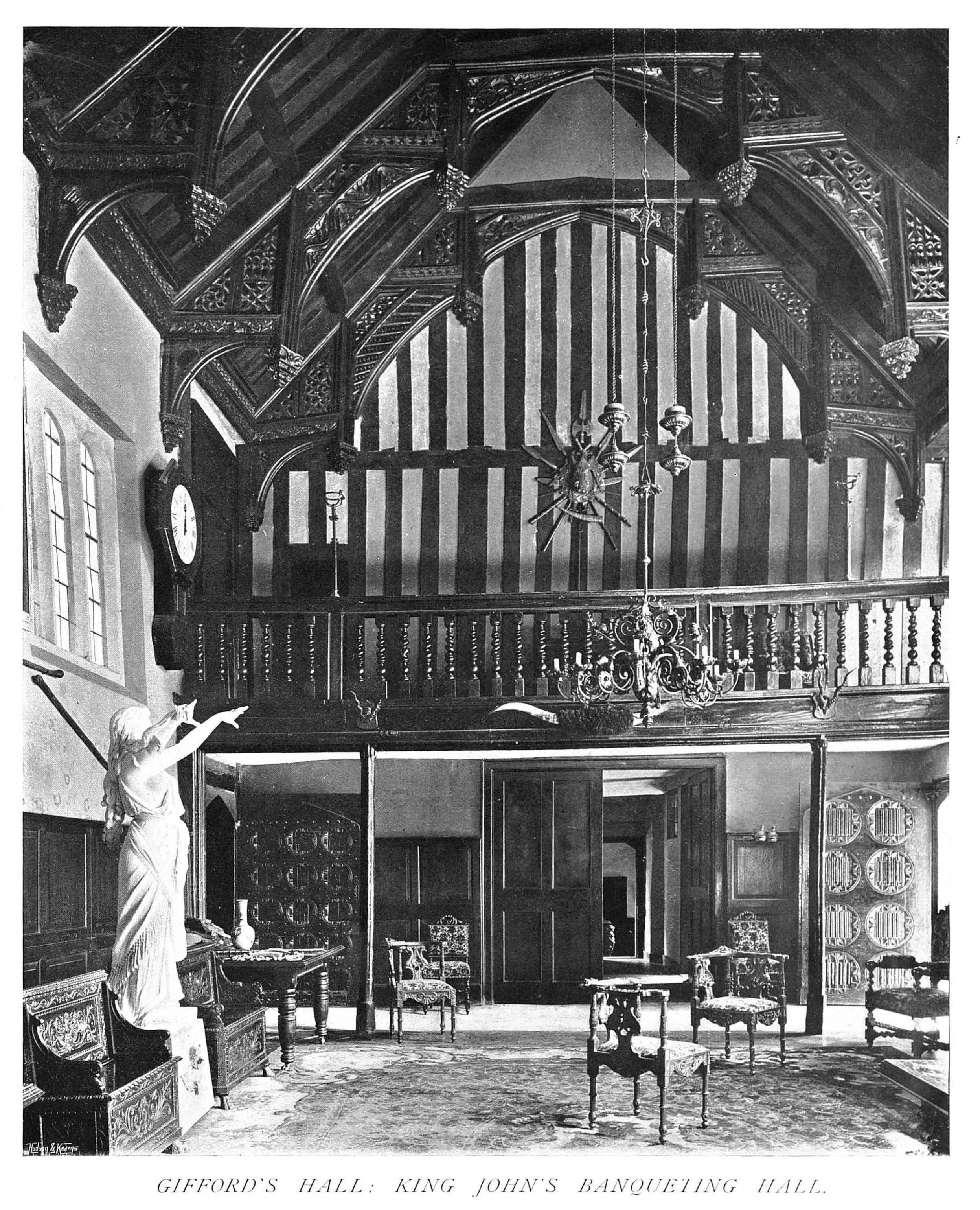
Giffords Hall great hall from the West

== Estate ==
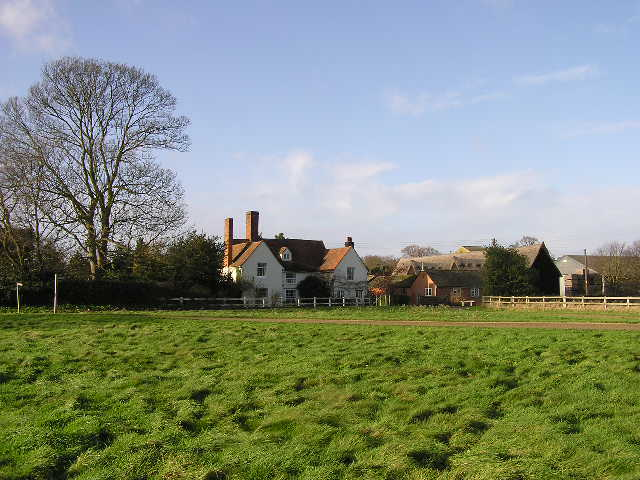
Giffords Hall Farm

The house is set within an agricultural estate. It totalled 1,512 acres (612 ha) in 1918.
