= Gifford's Hall, Wickhambrook =

Grade I listed building in the United Kingdom

Coordinates: 52°09′16″N 0°35′14″E

Gifford's Hall is a manor house in the civil parish of Wickhambrook, in the West Suffolk district, in the county of Suffolk, England. It is Grade I listed. Its name derives from the same Gifford family who also owned Giffords Hall, Stoke-by-Nayland.

In the reign of Edward I, Peter Giffard held half a fee here and by 1321 William Giffard received the grant of a free warren.

The Wickhambrook house passed to the Clopton family in the fourteenth century and subsequently to the Highams in the seventeenth century. After a period as a farm in the Victorian era it was divided into tenements before being bought by Seymour Lucas in 1904 who restored and modernised the building.
