= Stoke-by-Nayland =

Village in Suffolk, England

Coordinates: 51.98755°N 0.89171°E

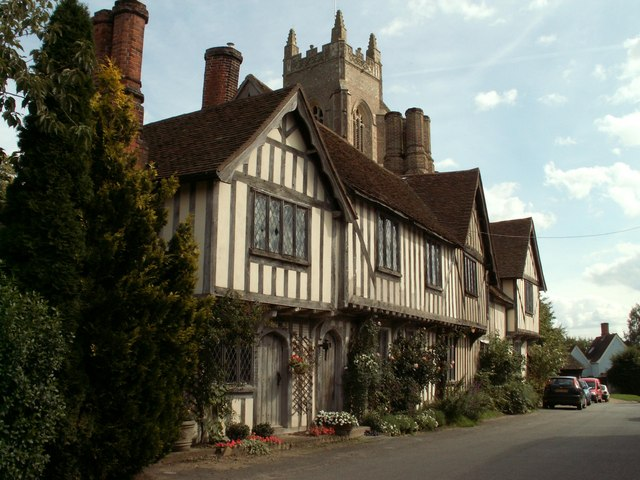
- Stoke-by-Nayland

- Location within Suffolk
- Population: 682 (2011)
- OS grid reference: TL986360
- Civil parish: Stoke-by-Nayland
- District: Babergh
- Shire county: Suffolk
- Region: East
- Country: England
- Sovereign state: United Kingdom
- Post town: COLCHESTER
- Postcode district: CO6
- Dialling code: 01206
- Police: Suffolk
- Fire: Suffolk
- Ambulance: East of England
- UK Parliament: South Suffolk
- Website: Stoke-by-Nayland Parish Council

Stoke-by-Nayland is a village and civil parish in the Babergh district, in the county Suffolk, England, close to the border with Essex. The parish includes the village Withermarsh Green and the hamlets Thorington Street and Scotland Street. The village has many cottages and timber-framed houses, all surrounding a recreation field. Possibly once the site of a monastery, the civil parish had a population of 703 at the 2001 Census, falling to 682 at the 2011 Census.

== History ==
The village was first recorded on 946 in the will of Ælfgar, an earl, where he endowed land to a community in the village, possibly a monastery.

=== St Mary's Church ===
The church was rebuilt in the 15th century and renovated in 1865. It appears several times in John Constable's paintings, though not always in the right place. The most notable feature is the red-brick tower; completed at around 1470 and surmounted by stone spires. Its buttresses are laced with canopied image niches. On its northern side is a Tudor porch, but the south porch, the main entrance, was entirely refaced by the Victorians. However, the windows and corbels reveal it to be one of the earliest parts of the church, an early-14th-century addition of two storeys to the building that was then replaced in the late 15th century. The tower is 126 feet (38 metres) high to the pinnacles. Of note is a brass memorial to Lady Catherine Howard, nee Molyns, who was the great grandmother of both Anne Boleyn and Catherine Howard, the second and fifth wives of Henry VIII.

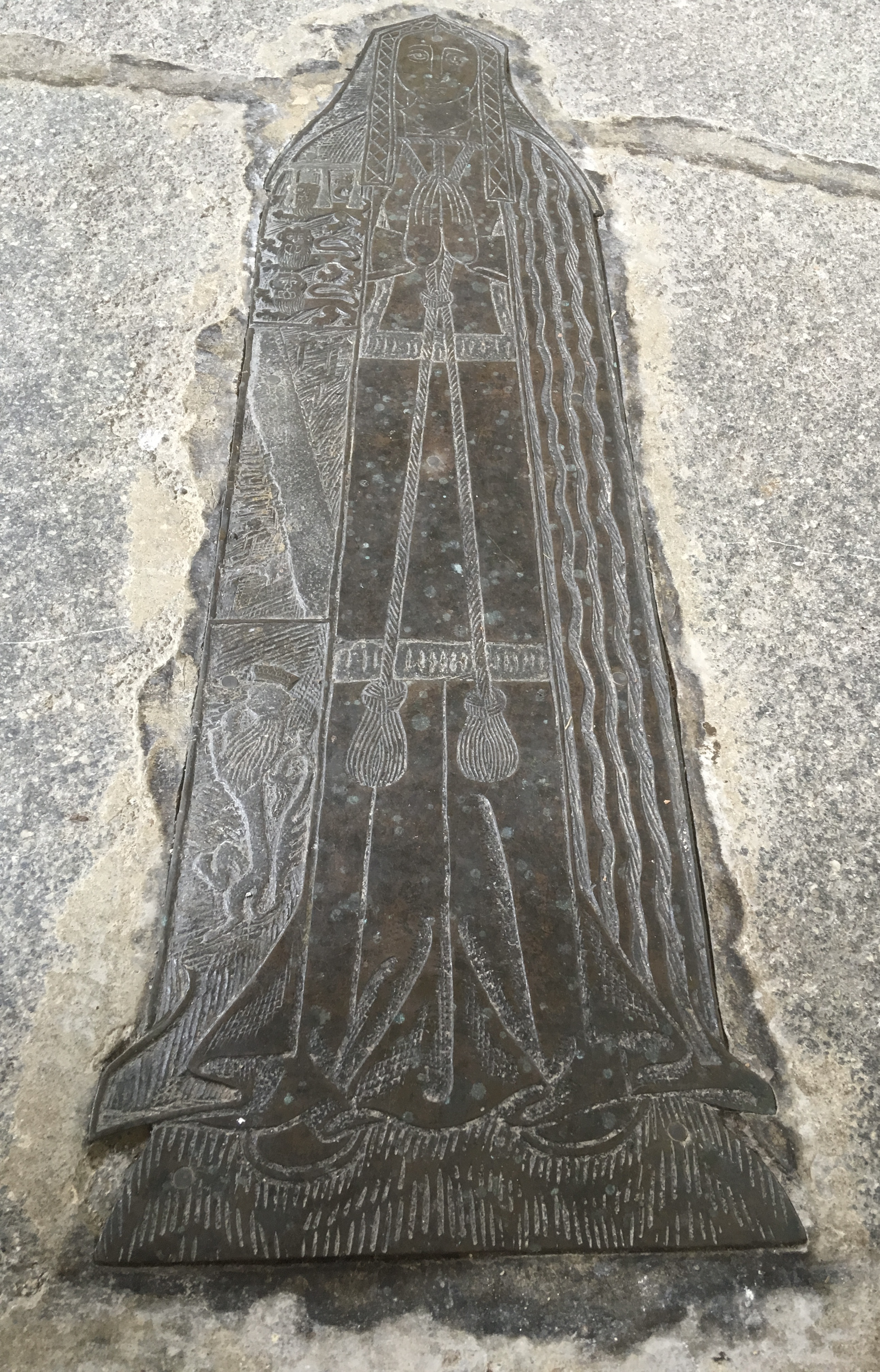
Lady Catherine Howard nee Molyns, died 16 January 1465 at Stoke-by-Nayland, Suffolk. She was the great-grandmother of both Anne Boleyn and Catherine Howard, the second and fifth wives of Henry VIII

=== Listed buildings ===
Stoke-by-Nayland's many listed buildings consist primarily of Grade II houses and cottages, mostly timber-framed and rendered, with plain-tile roofs, although some are thatched or slated. Many of the houses were built by the John Howard, 1st Duke of Norfolk and his family.

'''Giffords Hall''', Stoke-by-Nayland was described by Nikolaus Pevsner as “one of the loveliest houses of its date in England”.[1]

Thorington Hall, in a separate hamlet to the south-east of the village, is a 17th-century timber-framed and plastered house with much original detail. There are cross wings at the north-east and south-west ends, and a staircase wing which rises to above eaves level on the south-east front. The north-east wing has a jettied gable on both fronts, carved bressummer and bargeboards. The south-west wing has an oriel window on the upper storey on the north-west side, on four shaped brackets. It also includes a jettied gable with carved bressummer and bargeboards. The windows are mostly mullioned and transomed casements with leaded lights, some with the original 17th-century fastenings. There are some original windows, blocked. On the south-east front includes a modern glazed door with an 18th-century door-case and a scroll pediment on brackets. There are two heavy chimney stacks, one finely done with 6 grouped octagonal shafts.

Downs Farmhouse, no longer used as such, dates from the early 16th century, with later extensions. It is timber-framed and rendered; with rear extensions partly faced in 19th-century red brick. Of two storeys and on a 3-cell plan, its roofs are plain-tiled with the original chimney-stack set externally on the rear wall of the hall, and a cross entry. The stack has been rebuilt in plain red brick.

Street House is in Church Street and has a plain-tile roof above timber-framed construction behind a render finish.

The Maltings, backing onto the churchyard, and the Old Guildhall, facing it across the road, each has exposed timber-framing and jettied fronts designed to be seen. Both these buildings are of four bays divided into tenements.

Tendring Hall, which was demolished in 1954, was the home of John Howard, 1st Duke of Norfolk.

=== Historical writings ===
The village features in the 1868 National Gazetteer of Great Britain, volume 10, as:

STOKE-BY-NAYLAND, a parish in the hundred of Babergh, county Suffolk, 1½ mile N.E. of Nayland, and 5 miles E. of Bures railway station. Colchester is its post town. The village, which was formerly a market town, is situated near the river Stour. The par. contains the chapelry of Leavenheath, and had a monastery endowed by the Saxon Earl of Algar, traces of which are still existing. The living is a vicarage in the diocese of Ely, value £278. The church, dedicated to St. Mary, is an ancient structure, with a tower and six bells. There is also a district church at Leavenheath, the living of which is a perpetual curacy, value £56. The parochial charities produce about £25 per annum, exclusive of some almshouses. £8 go towards Lady Windsor's hospital. There is a National school for both sexes. Tendring Hall is the principal residence.

In 1870–72, John Marius Wilson's Imperial Gazetteer of England and Wales described the village as:

STOKE-BY-NAYLAND, a parish, with a village, in Sudbury district, Suffolk; 1½ mile NE of Nayland, and 6 E by N of Bures r. station. It has a post-office under Colchester. Acres, 5,277. Real property, £9,299. Pop. in 1851, 1,406; in 1861, 1,275. Houses, 302. The decrease of pop. was caused partly by the closing of silk-mills. The property is divided among a few. Tendring Hall is the seat of Sir R. Rowley, Bart.; and Giffords Hall, of P. Mannock, Esq. A monastery was founded here by the Saxon Earl A1gar. The living is a vicarage the diocese of Ely. Value, £355.* Patron, Sir R.Rowley, Bart. The church is later English, with a lofty tower; and was restored in 1865. The p. curacy of Leavenheath is a separate benefice. There are a Roman Catholic chapel, a national school, alms houses, and other charities £25. Lord mayor Capel, ancestor of the Earl of Essex, was a native.

In 1887, John Bartholomew also wrote an entry on Stoke Nayland in the Gazetteer of the British Isles with a much shorter description:

Stoke (by Nayland), par. and vil., Suffolk - par. 5277 ac., pop. 1150; vil., 2 miles NE. of Nay land and 6 miles E. of Bures; P.O.

== Amenities ==
Stoke-by-Nayland contains two schools, one primary, Stoke by Nayland Church of England Primary School, and one independent school, OneSchool Global UK. The village hall was established in 1911 as the Stoke by Nayland Institute. Now a registered charity the hall is now a general meeting place and hosts variety of events. Stoke By Nayland Hotel Golf and Spa is home to a golf course with two 18 hole courses. The club hosts two international PGA Tour events; the Senior Tour since 2006 and the EuroPro Tour since 2004. James Andrews Golf School moved to Stoke by Nayland Hotel, Golf and Spa in 2018 https://www.jamesandrewsgolfschool.co.uk

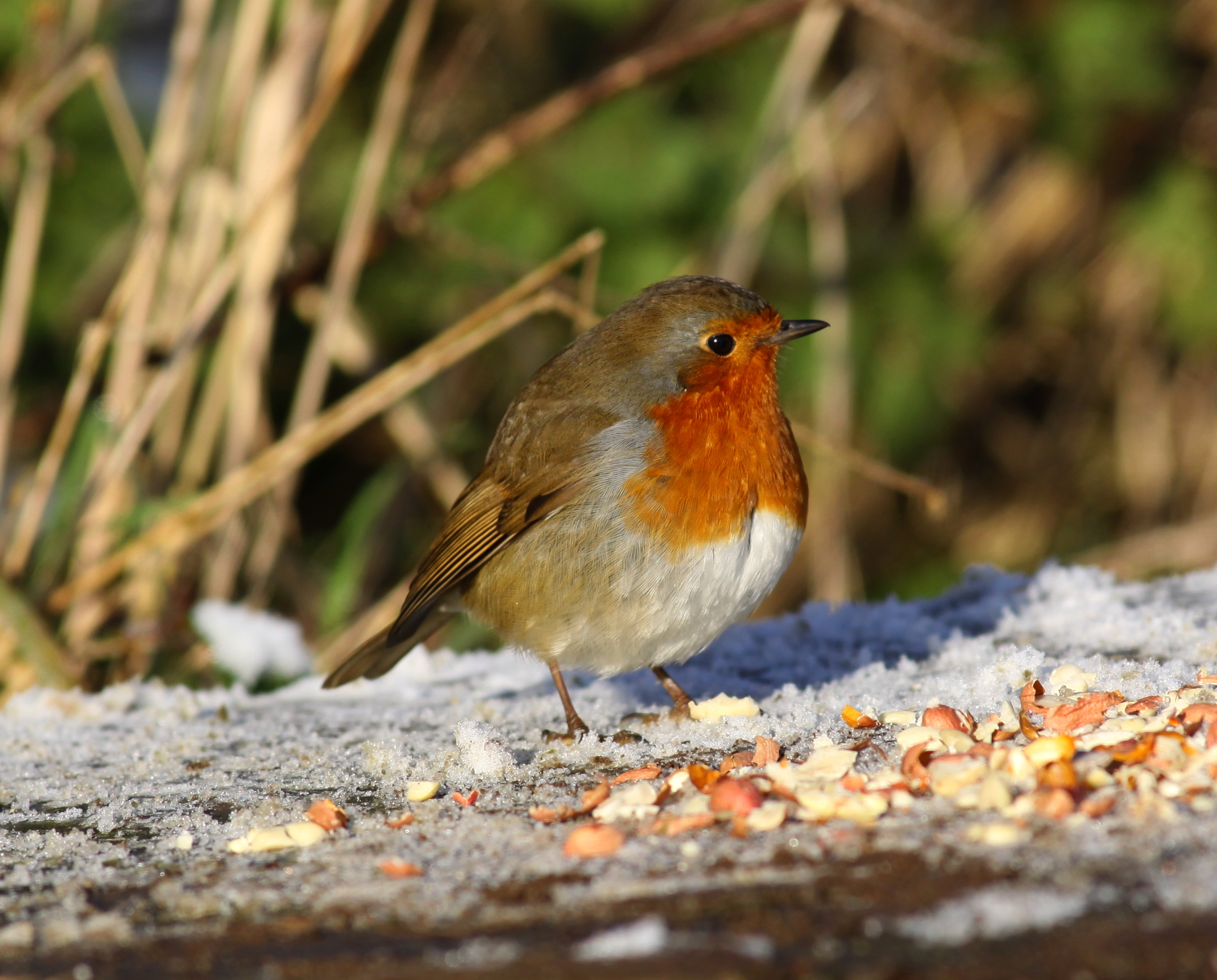
A Robin in Cherry Wood

== Transport ==
The village is served by buses connecting it to Hadleigh, Polstead, Langham, Colchester, Ipswich, Sudbury, Leavenheath, and Great Horkesley.

== Notable persons with connections to Stoke-by-Nayland ==
- John Howard, 1st Duke of Norfolk.
- Lady Catherine Howard nee Molyns, d 1465, the great grandmother of both Anne Boleyn and Catherine Howard, the second and fifth wives of Henry VIII.
- The Mannock baronets of Giffords Hall, Stoke-by-Nayland.
- William Songer, who travelled to Nelson, New Zealand on the Whitby as Captain Arthur Wakefield's servant in 1841, was born in the village of Stoke-by-Nayland, and suggested naming the township of Stoke in New Zealand after his birthplace. (The name "Nayland" also features prominently near New Zealand's Stoke.)

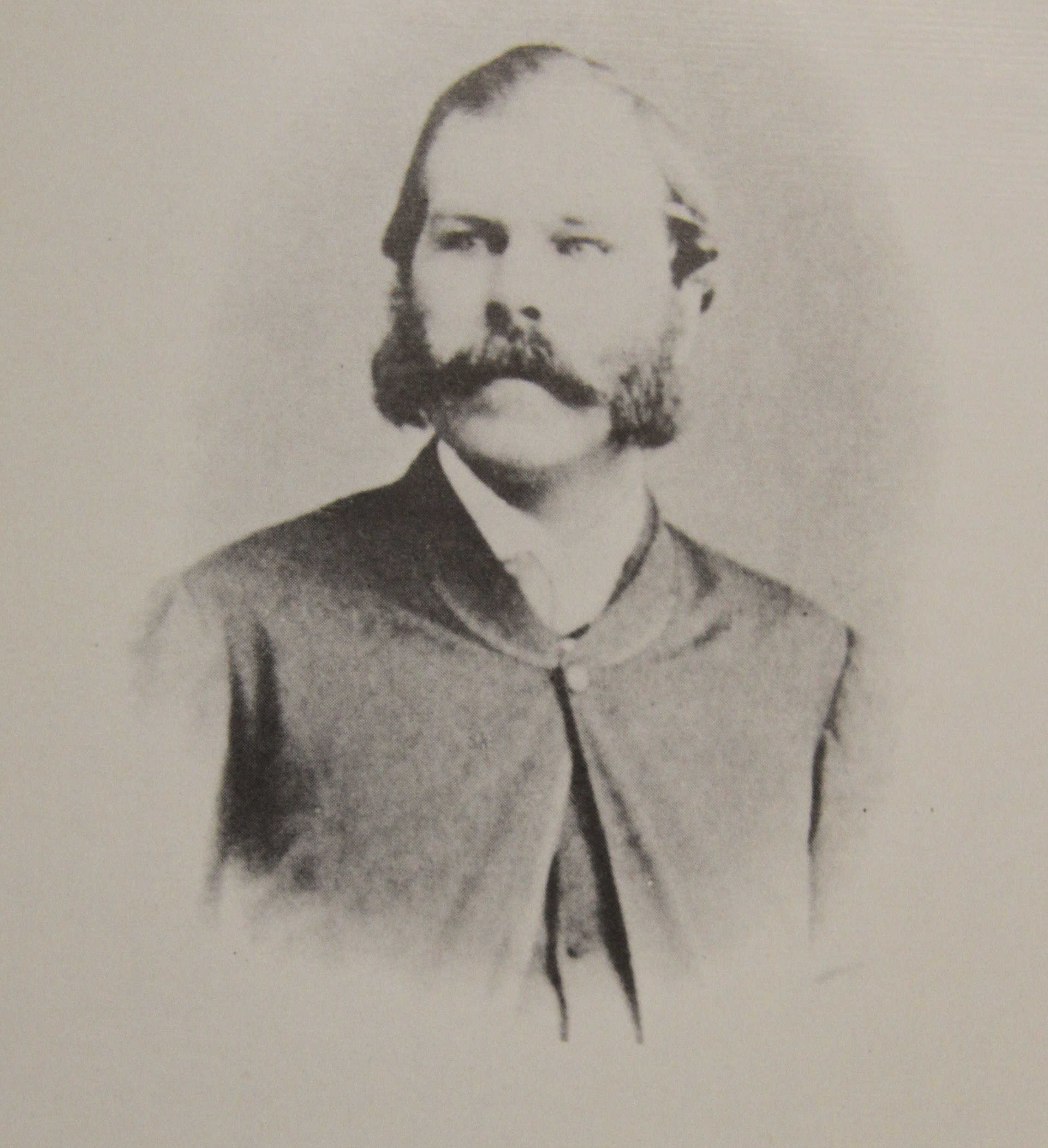
Charles Torlesse

- Charles Torlesse (1825 – 14 November 1866) was born in Stoke-by-Nayland and worked as a prominent surveyor for the Canterbury Association in Canterbury, New Zealand. He returned to England due to ill health and died in 1866. He is buried in Stoke-by-Nayland.
- Rowley Baronets: Rear-Admiral Sir Joshua Rowley, 1st Baronet (1 May 1734 – 26 February 1790) was a Royal Navy officer.
- Lady Anne Windsor married Henry Windsor, 5th Baron Windsor, son of Edward Windsor, 3rd Baron Windsor, and of Lady Katherine de Vere, daughter of John de Vere, 16th Earl of Oxford. Henry Lord Windsor died in 1605, aged 43. Lady Anne Windsor died in 1615 and is buried in St Mary's Church.

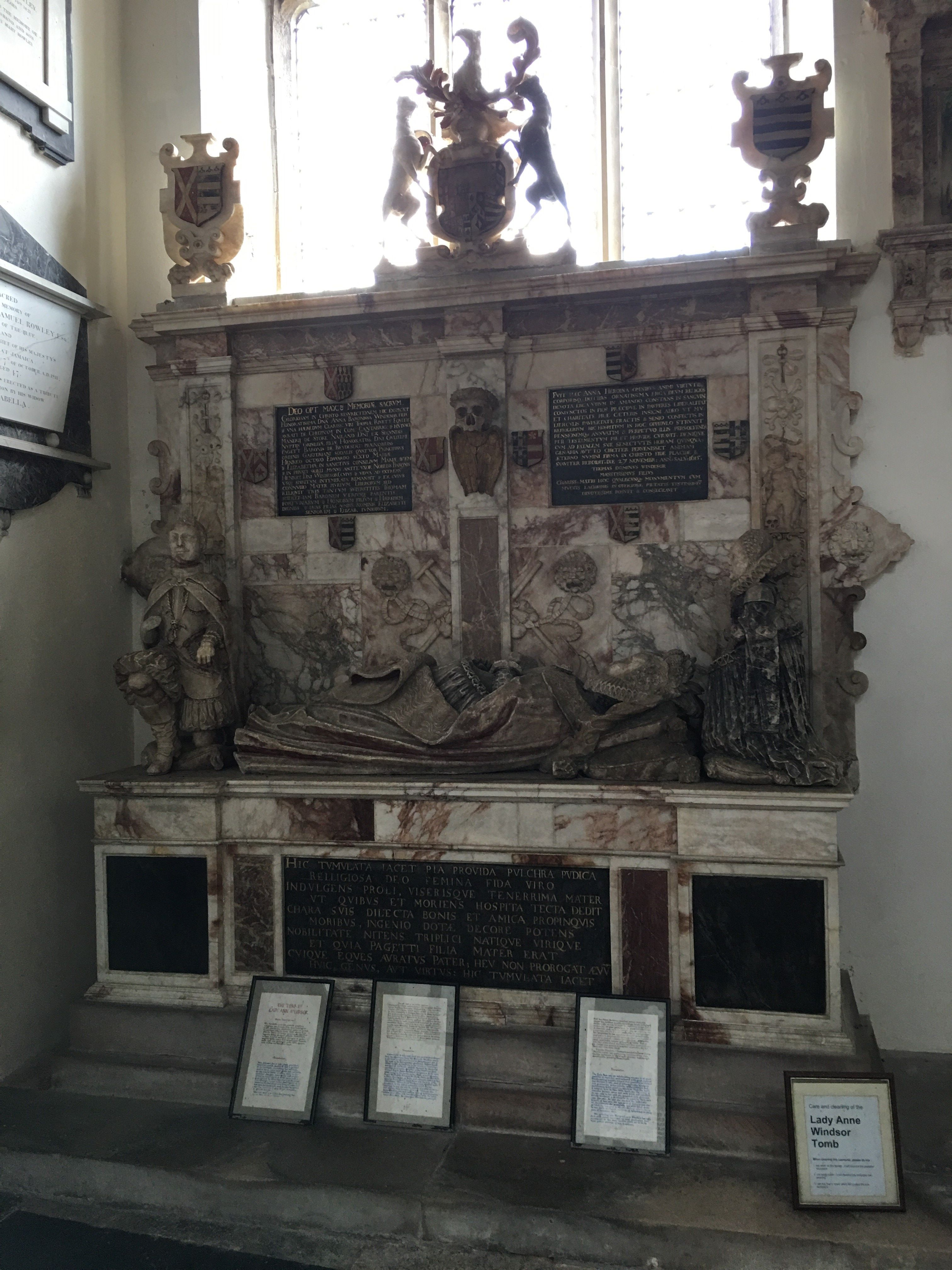
Tomb of Lady Anne Windsor, St Mary's Church, Stoke-by-Nayland

- Æthelflæd of Damerham: Æthelflæd (known as Æthelflæd of Damerham), the second wife of King Edmund I of England
- David Hicks, interior designer
- Ralph Agas (or Radulph Agas) (c. 1540 – 26 November 1621), English land-surveyor, was born at Stoke-by-Nayland, Suffolk, about 1540, and entered upon the practice of his profession in 1566.
- Edward Aggas (fl. 1564–1601)], bookseller, printer, translator, and son of Robert Aggas of Stoke-by-Nayland.
- Sir William Capell, son of John Capell, held the office of Alderman of London and the office of Lord Mayor of London from 1503 to 1504 and from 1509 to 1510.
- Thomas St Lawrence, 11th Baron Howth (Earl of Howth) lived at Stoke-by-Nayland. He succeeded to the title of 11th Baron Howth in 1643.
- George Webb (cricketer, born 1857)
- Beryl Cook, OBE (1926 – 2008), English artist best known for her original and instantly recognisable paintings.

== Pictures of Stoke by Nayland ==
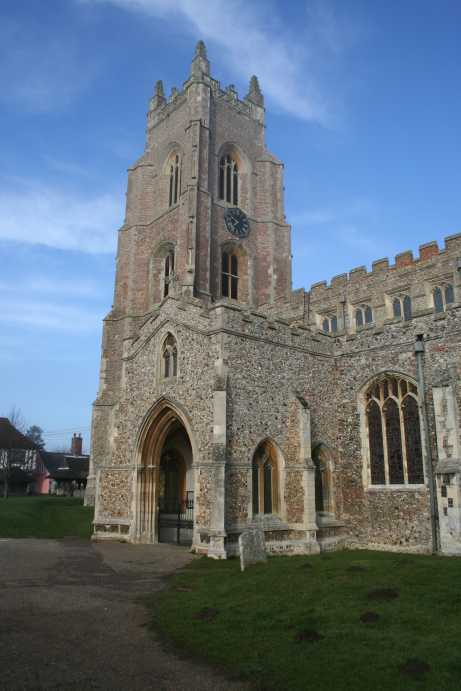
St Mary's Church

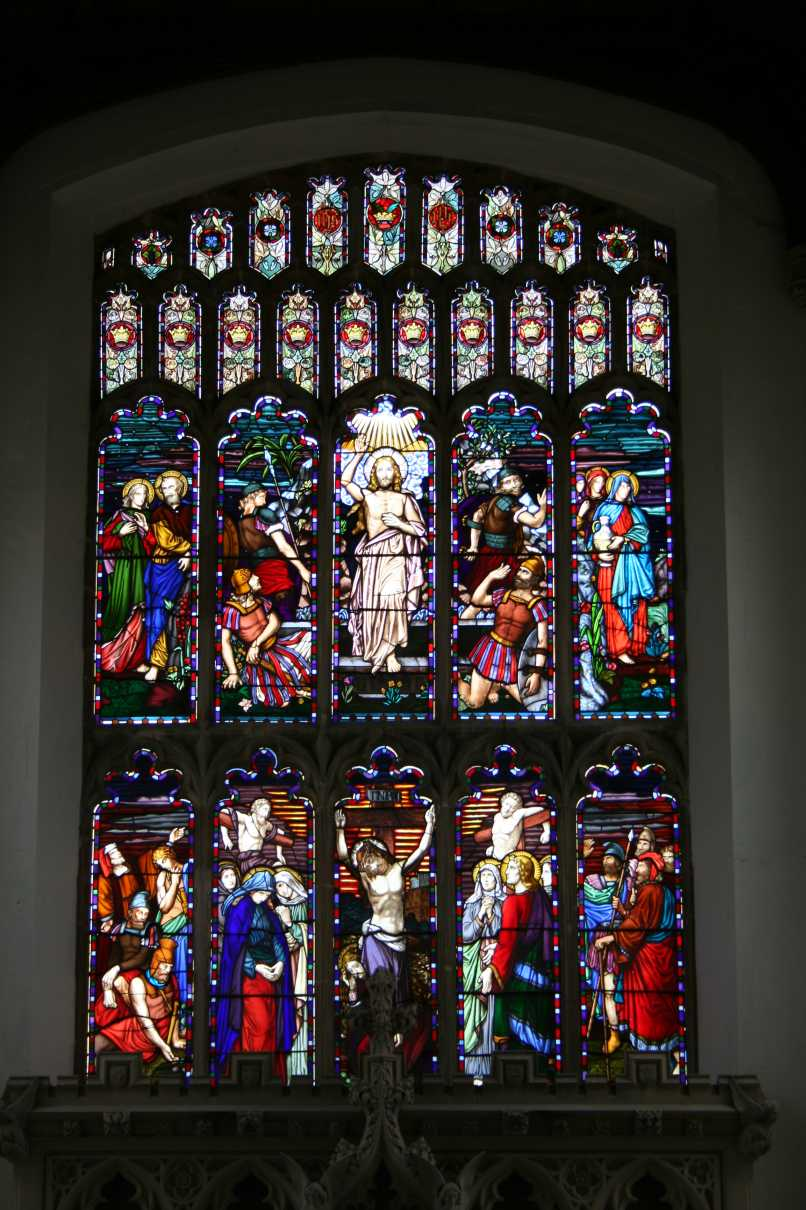
The East Window

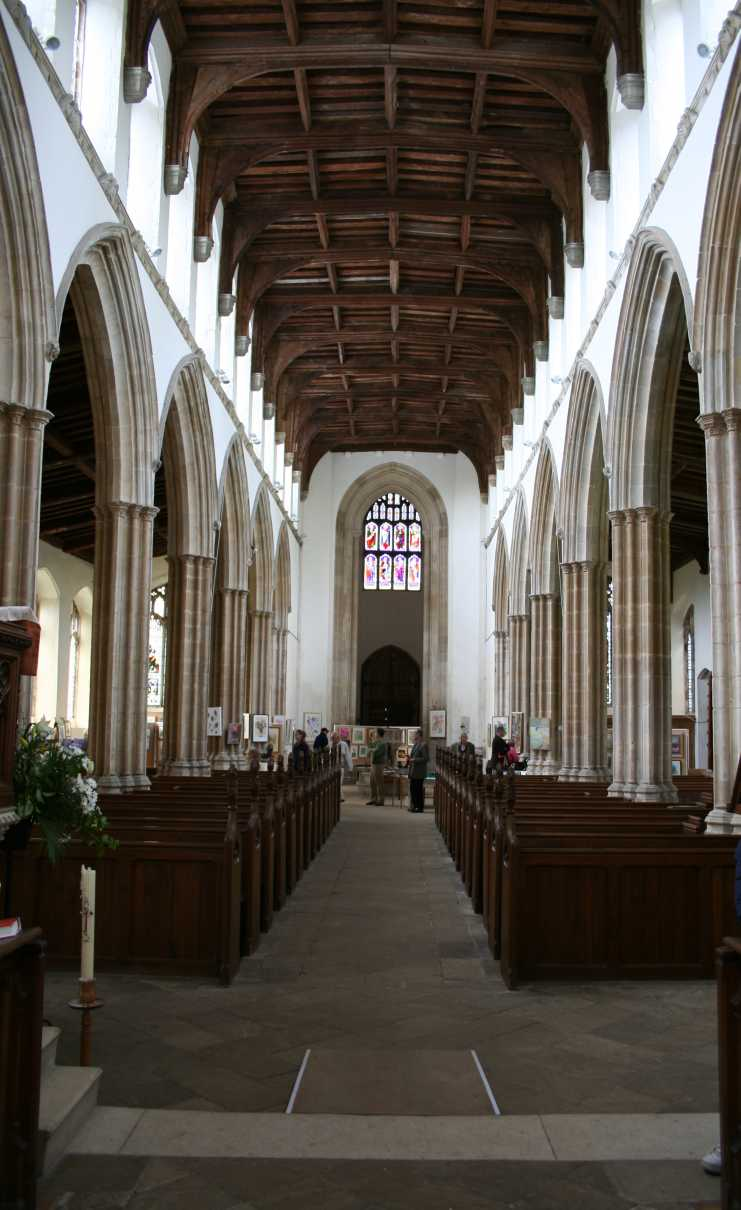
The West Window

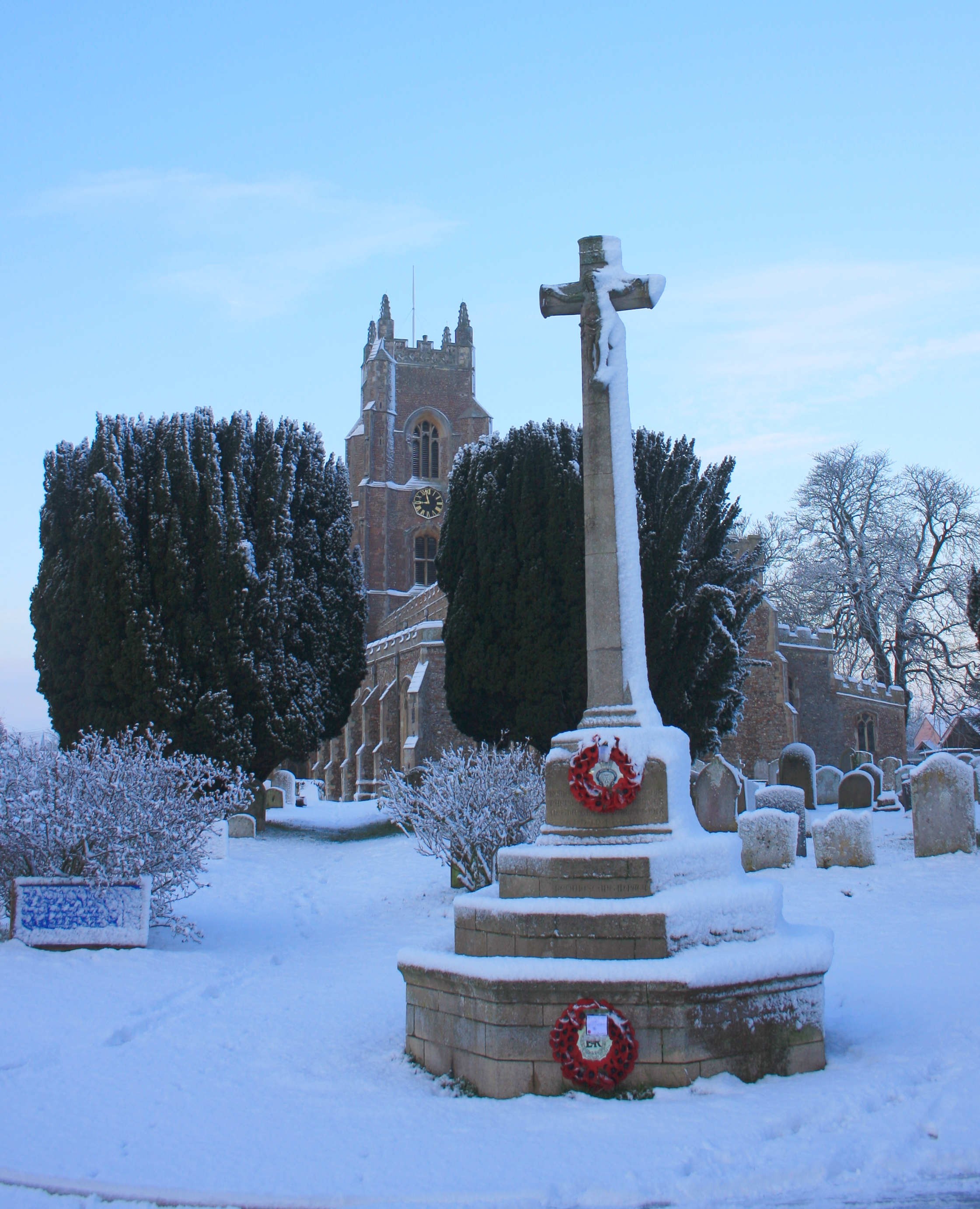
St Mary's Church Churchyard

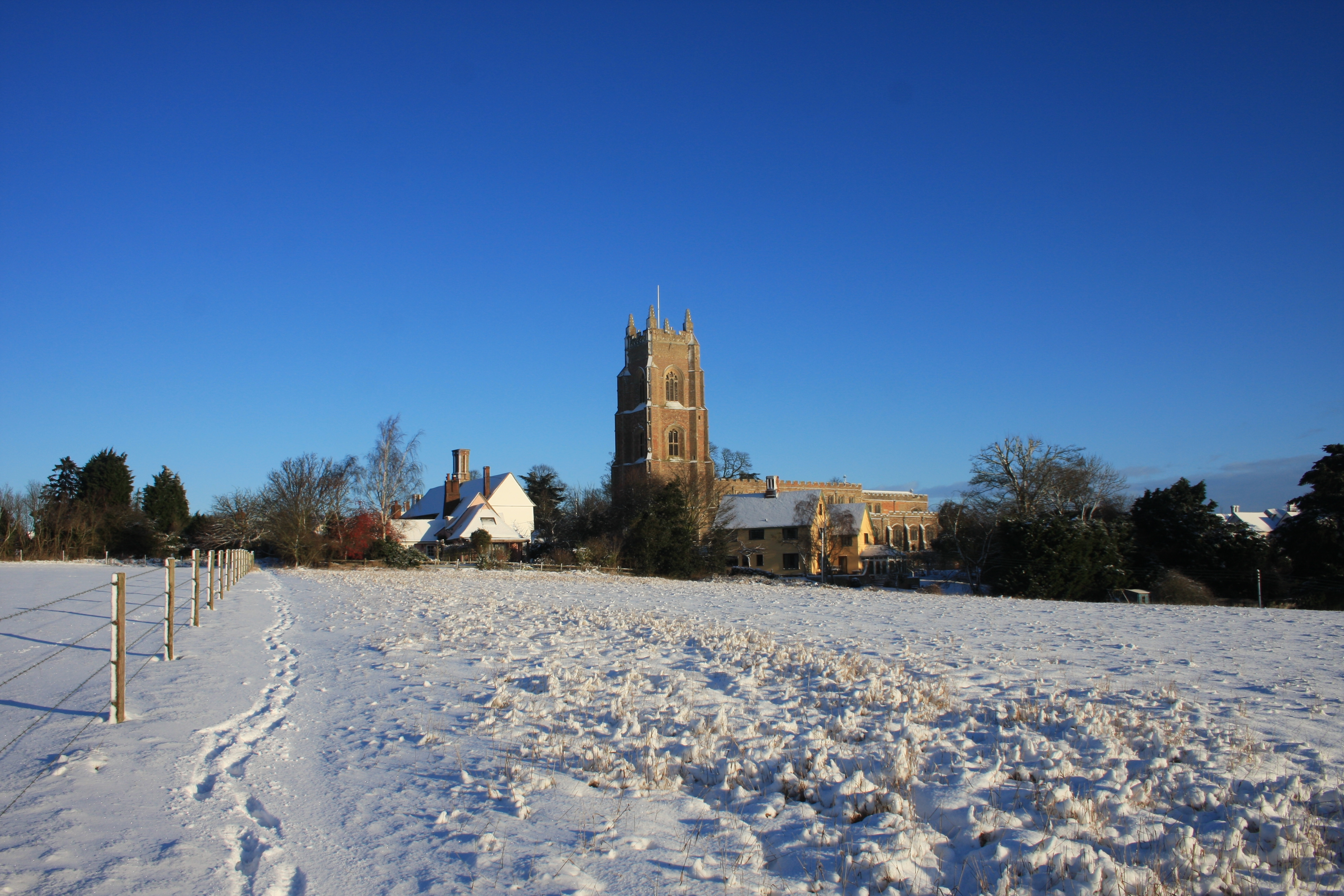
St Mary's Church

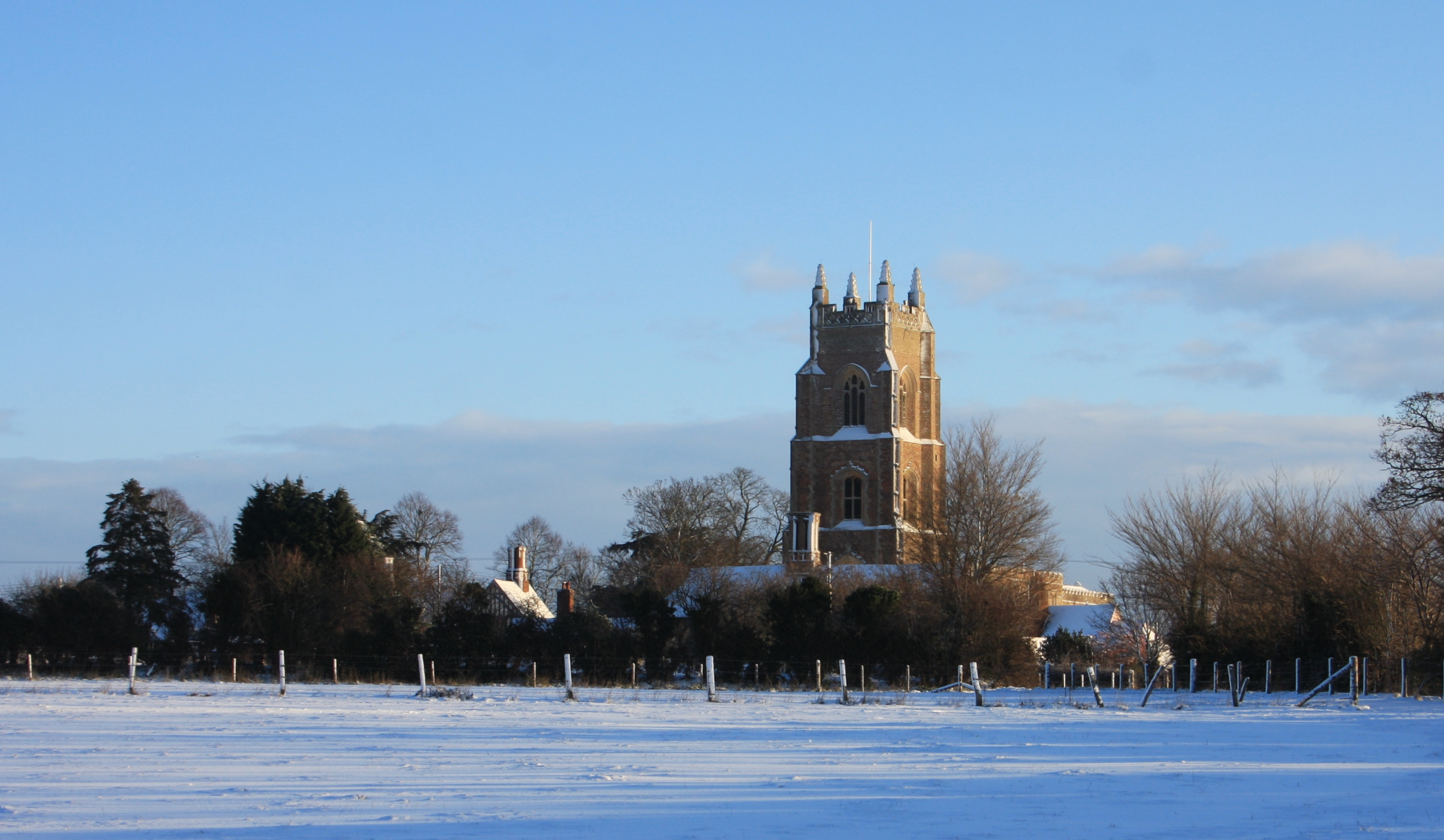
St Mary's Church, from the West

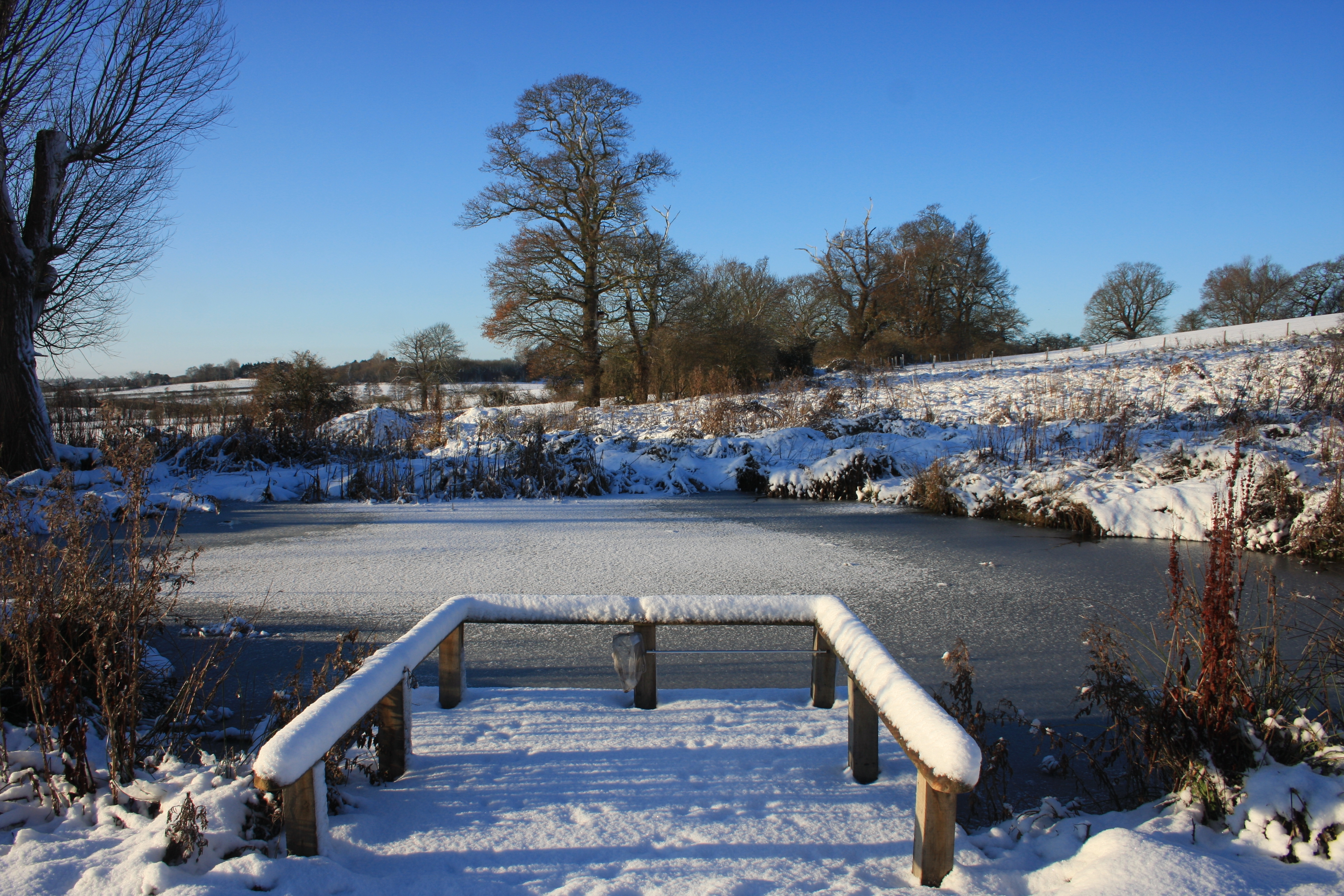
Cherry Wood Community Woodland

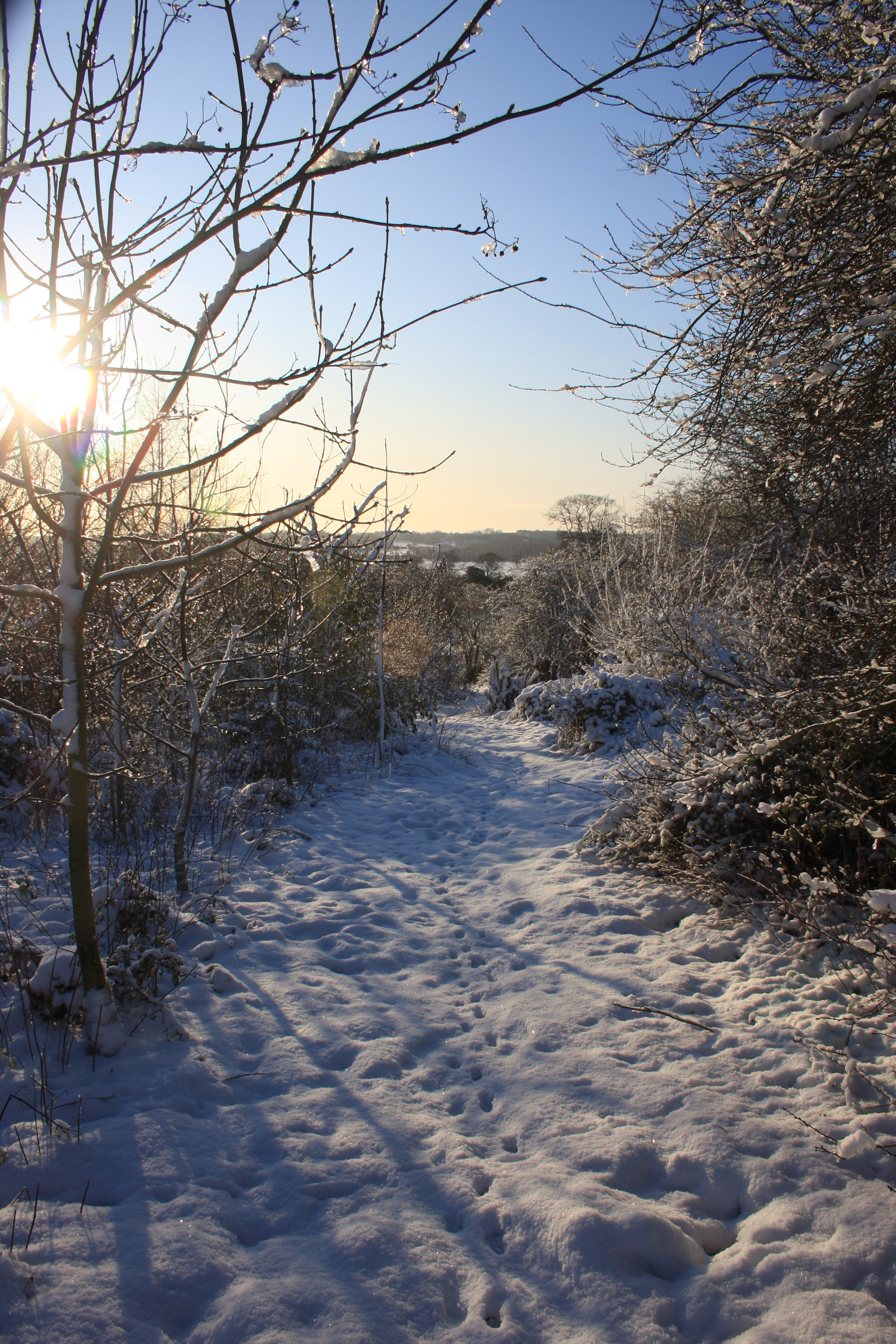
Cherry Wood Community Woodland

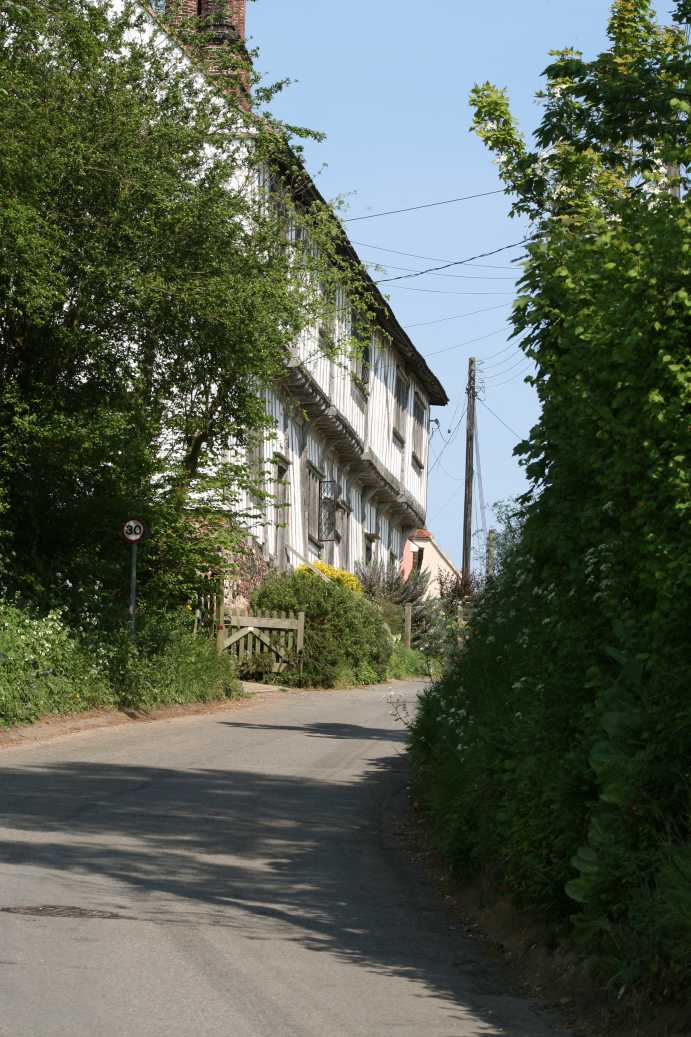
School Street (formerly Back Lane)

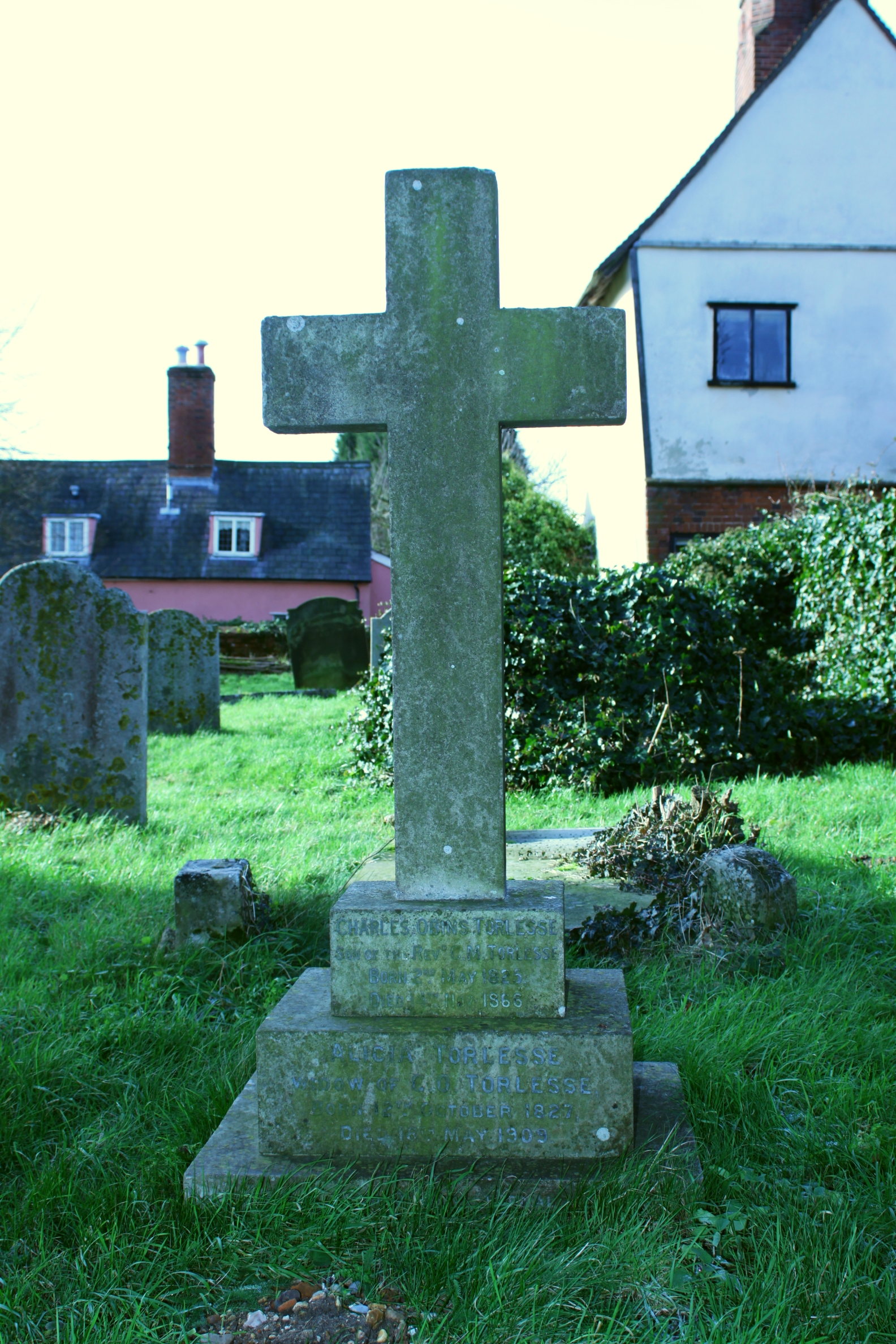
Headstone of Charles Obins Torlesse

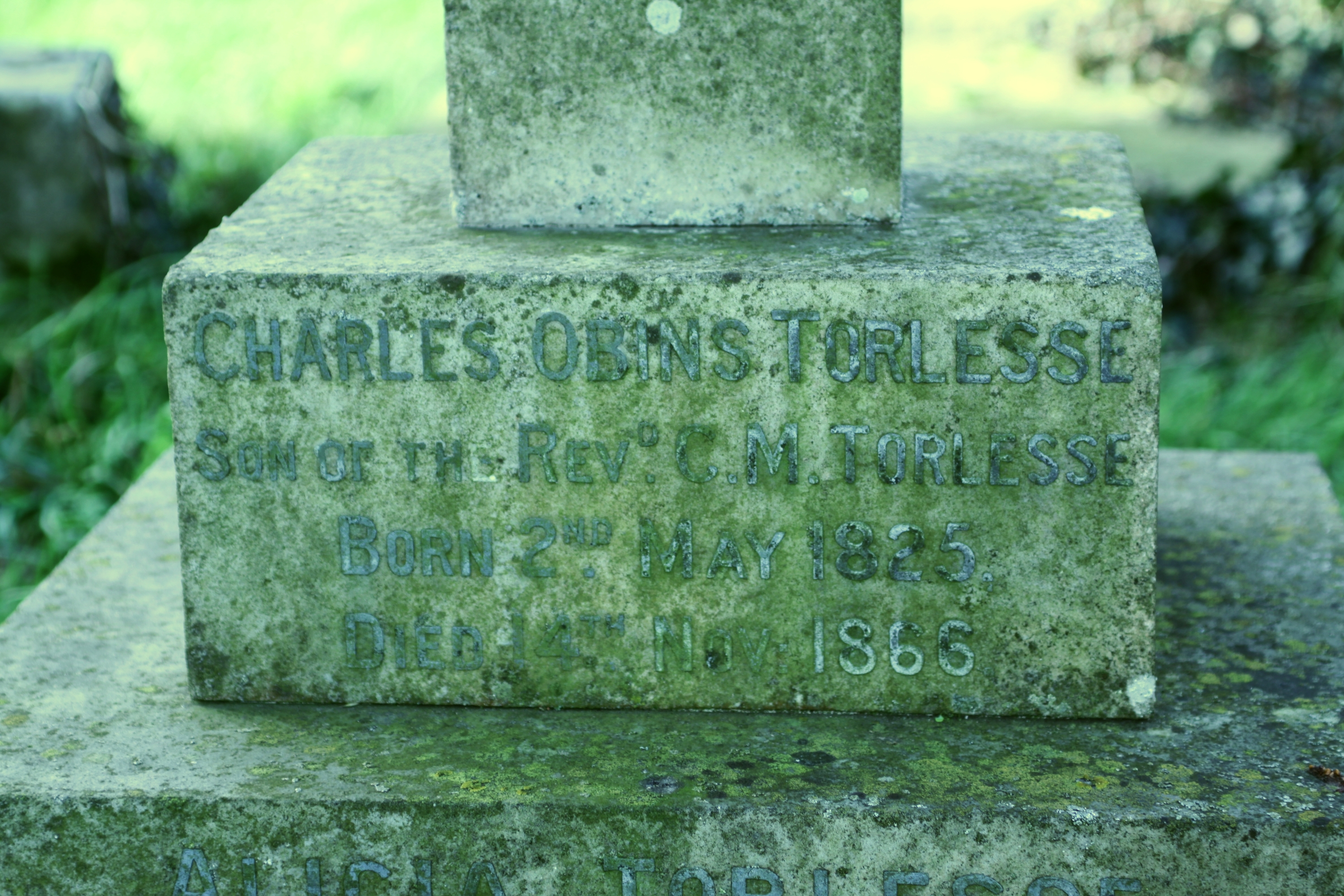
Headstone of Charles Obins Torlesse
