= Mannock baronets =

Extinct baronetcy in the Baronetage of England

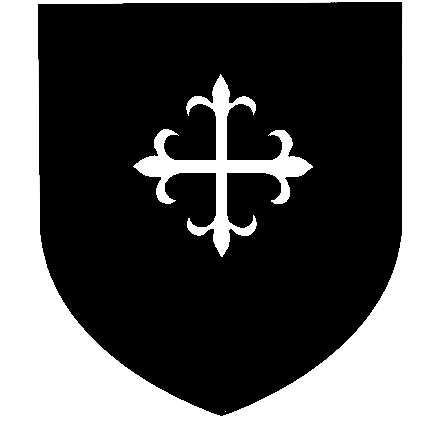
Arms of the baronets Mannock of Gifford's Hall. Recreated from the blazon: "sable, cross flory, argent".

The Mannock Baronetcy, of Gifford's Hall near Stoke-by-Nayland in the County of Suffolk, was a title in the Baronetage of England. It was created on 1 June 1627 for Francis Mannock. The title became extinct on the death of the ninth Baronet in 1787.

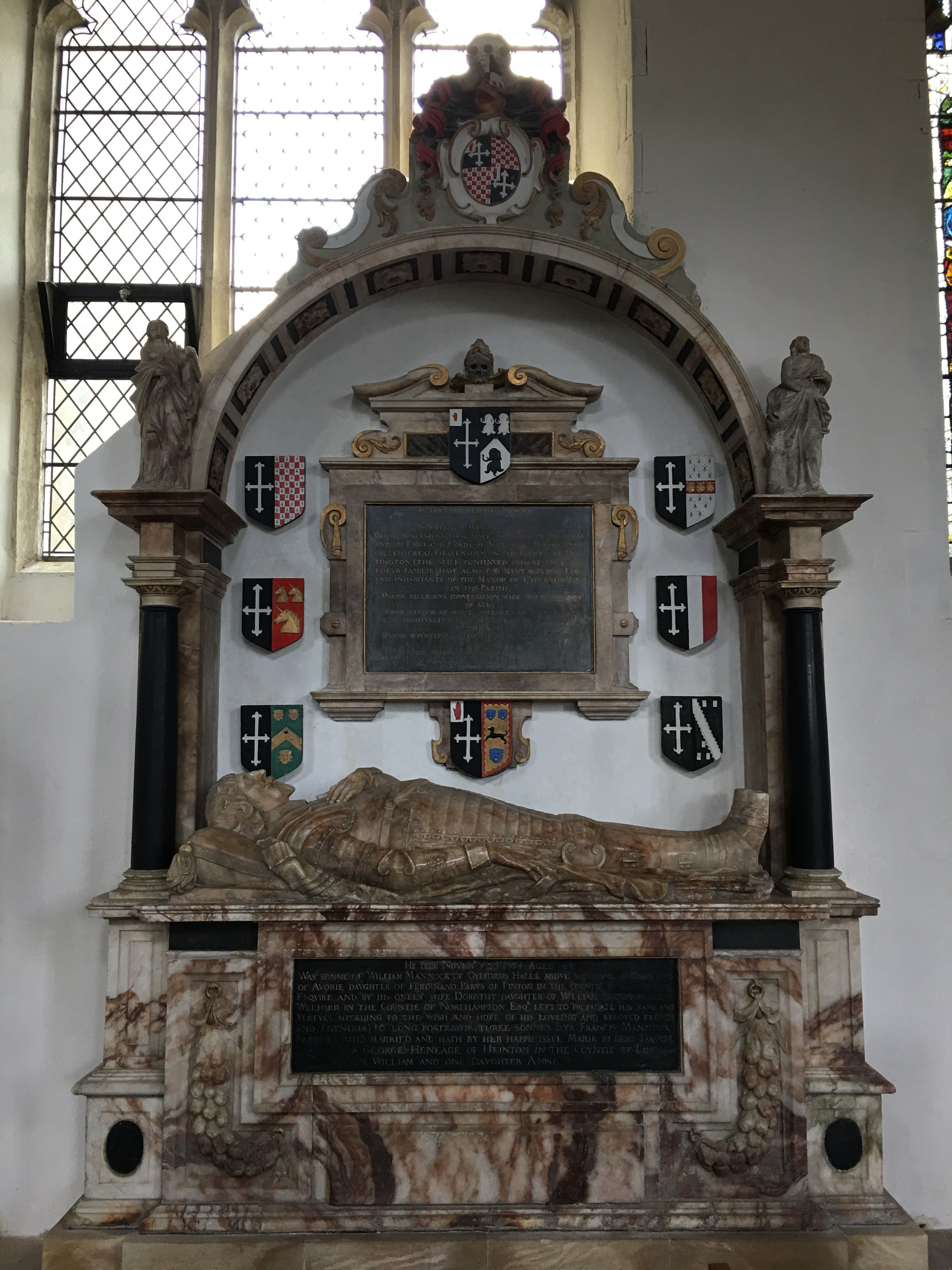
Tomb of Sir Francis Mannock, 1st Baronet, St Mary's Church, Stoke-by-Nayland

== Mannock baronets, of Gifford's Hall (1627) ==
- Sir Francis Mannock, 1st Baronet (died 1634)
- Sir Francis Mannock, 2nd Baronet (died 1687)
- Sir William Mannock, 3rd Baronet (died 1714)
- Sir Francis Mannock, 4th Baronet (1675–1758)
- Sir William Mannock, 5th Baronet (died 1764)
- Sir William Anthony Mannock, 6th Baronet (1759–1776)
- Sir Francis Mannock, 7th Baronet (1710–1778)
- Sir Thomas Mannock, 8th Baronet (died 1781)
- Sir George Mannock, 9th Baronet (died 1787)
