= Cosford =

Cosford may refer to:

- Cosford, Shropshire, a village
  - RAF Cosford, a Royal Air Force station, formerly DCAE Cosford
  - Royal Air Force Museum Cosford
- Cosford Hundred, Suffolk, a former government administrative division
- Cosford Rural District, a former rural district in West Suffolk
- Cosford, Warwickshire, a village and civil parish
- Cosford Container Park, a shopping mall in Changi, Singapore
- Cosford (surname), list of notable people with the surname
