= Cosford Rural District =

Rural district in West Suffolk, England

Cosford
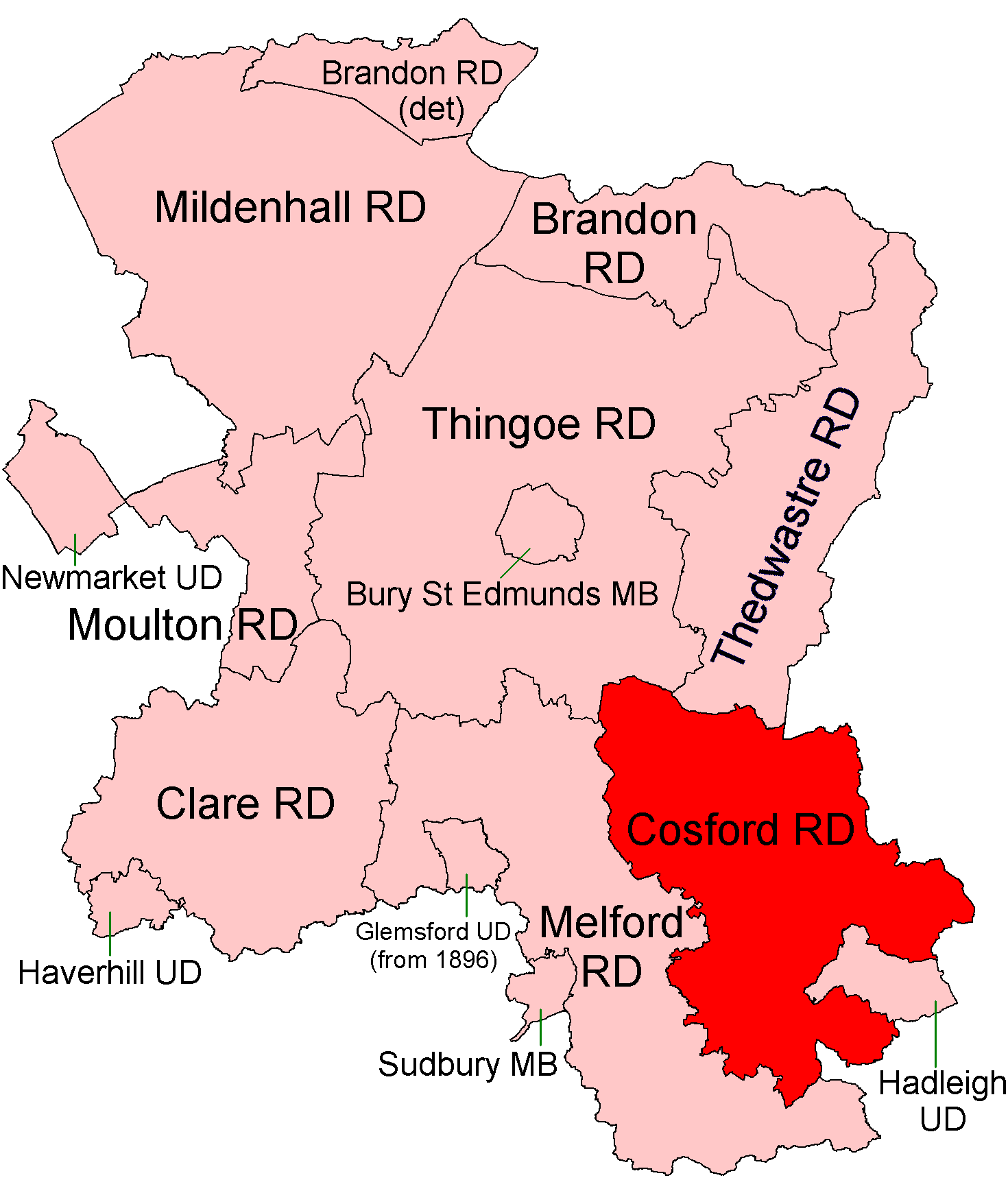
- Location within West Suffolk, 1894
- History
  - Created: 1894
  - Abolished: 1974
  - Succeeded by: Babergh
- Status: Rural district

Cosford Rural District was a rural district in the administrative county of West Suffolk, England. It was created in 1894 out of the earlier Cosford rural sanitary district, except for Hadleigh parish which was made a separate urban district. Only minor adjustments were made to its boundary in the reorganisation of 1935. It was named after the historic hundred of Cosford, although the rural district covered a significantly larger area that included most of Cosford hundred (with the notable exception of Hadleigh) and part of the neighbouring hundred of Babergh.

Since 1 April 1974 it has formed part of the local government district of Babergh.

== Parishes ==
Cosford RD contained the parishes of

1. Aldham,
2. Bildeston,
3. Boxford,
4. Brent Eleigh,
5. Brettenham,
6. Chelsworth,
7. Cockfield,
8. Edwardstone,
9. Elmsett,
10. Groton,
11. Hadleigh Hamlet (abolished 1935),
12. Hitcham,
13. Kersey,
14. Kettlebaston,
15. Lavenham,
16. Layham,
17. Lindsey,
18. Milden,
19. Monks Eleigh,
20. Nedging with Naughton (2 parishes before 1935),
21. Polstead,
22. Preston St Mary,
23. Semer,
24. Thorpe Morieux,
25. Wattisham
26. Whatfield.

== Statistics ==
Year	Area		Population	Density (pop/ha)
Year	acres	ha	Population	Density (pop/ha)
1911	48,573	19,657	11,808	0.60
1921	48,573	19,657	10,392	0.53
1931	48,573	19,657	9,551	0.49
1951	48,530	19,640	9,536	0.49
1961	48,529	19,639	9,068	0.46
