= Cosford Hundred =

Hundred of Suffolk, England

Coordinates: 52.1°N 0.9°E

Cosford Hundred

Cosford was a hundred of Suffolk, consisting of 30,712 acres (124.29 km^{2}).

The hundred consisted of Hadleigh, the only town of any size, and seventeen other parishes in western Suffolk. The area is undulating and agriculturally-fertile with clay soil, watered by the River Brett and its tributary streams. It is about twelve miles (19 km) in length from north to south and around five wide, and is bounded by the Hundreds of Samford, Babergh, Thedwestry, Stow and Bosmere and Claydon.

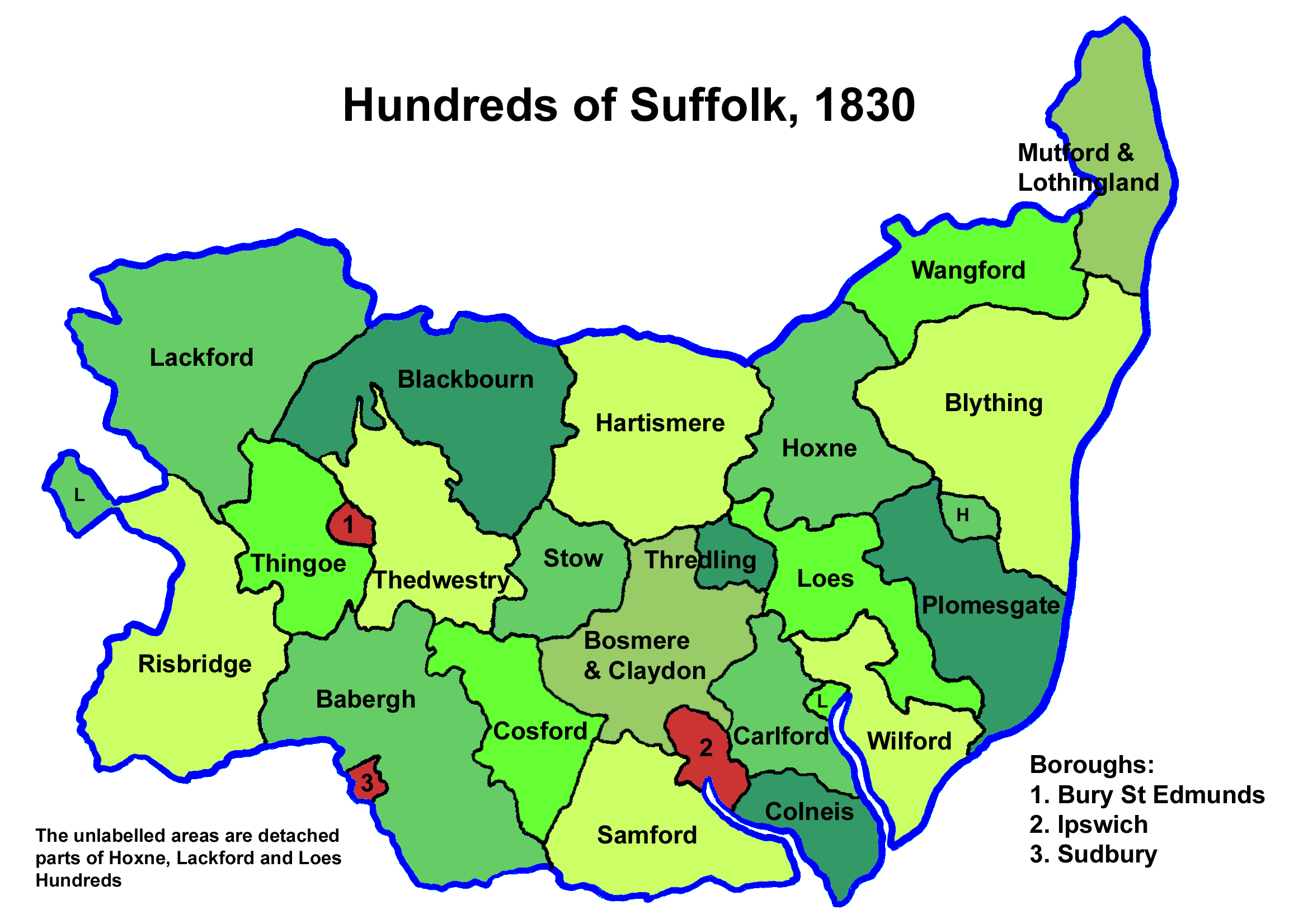
Suffolk hundreds

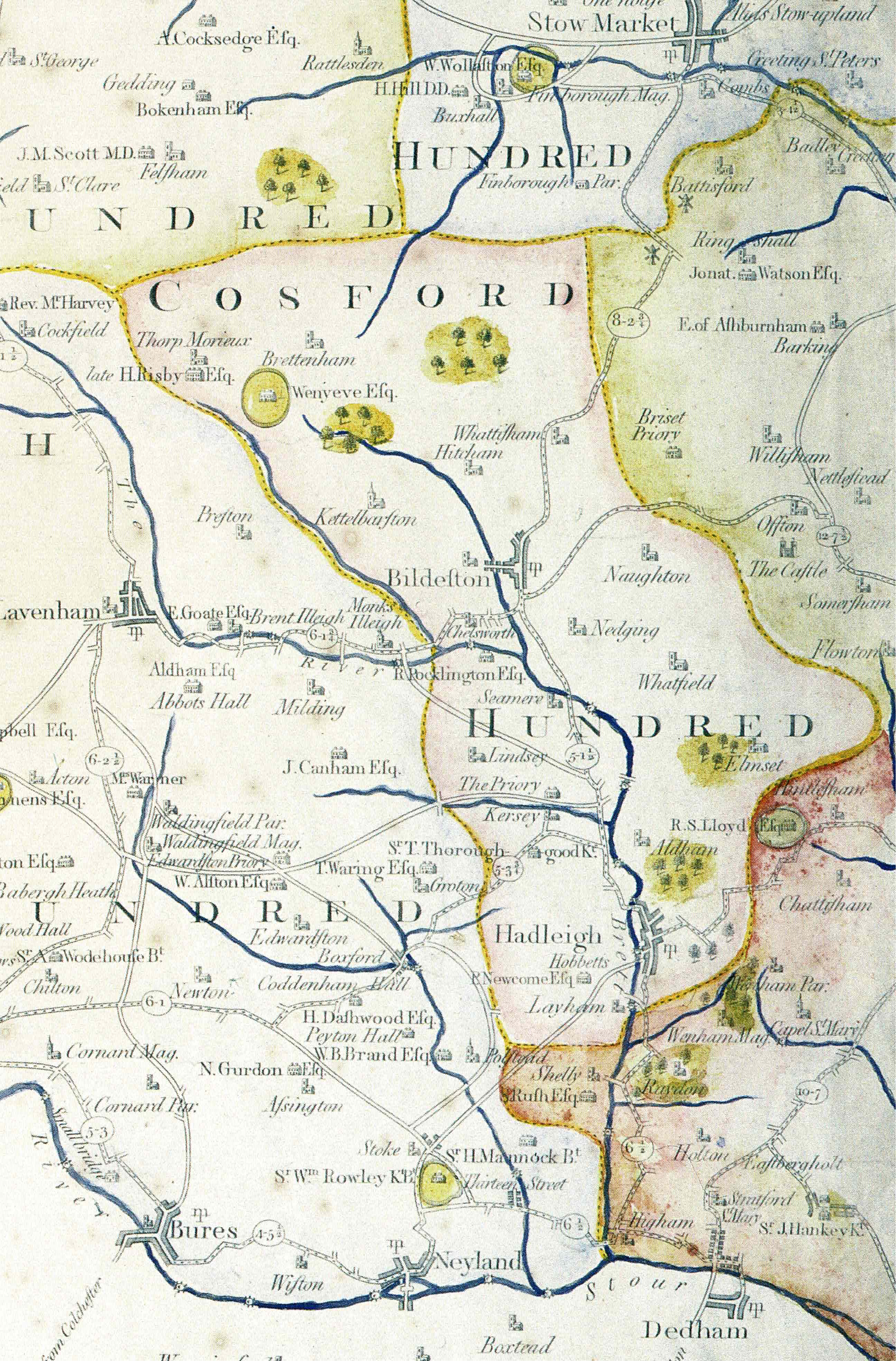
Cosford Hundred, John Lirby, 1766

Cosford was in Coxford Union in the Liberty of St Edmund and in the Deanery and Archdeaconry of Sudbury. The area was until the nineteenth century part of the diocese of Norwich until it was moved to that of Ely. Hadleigh itself however is a peculiar of the Archbishop of Canterbury.

Listed as Cursforde in the Domesday Book of 1086 and subsequently known for a period as Corsford or Corsforth, the name Cosford means "ford of the river Cors or Corsa".

== Parishes ==
Cosford Hundred consisted of the following 17 parishes:

Parish	Area (acres)
Aldham	1715
Bildeston	1240
Brettenham	1550
Chelsworth	860
Elmsett	1974
Hadleigh	4288
Hadleigh Hamlet†	610
Hitcham	4056
Kersey	1510
Kettlebaston	1006
Layham	2489
Lindsey	1246
Naughton	854
Nedging	810
Semer	1206
Thorpe Morieux	2428
Wattisham	1299
Whatfield	1571

†Hadleigh hamlet is a separate township and part of Boxford parish in Babergh hundred.
