= Listed buildings in Nedging-with-Naughton =

Civil Parish in Suffolk, England

Nedging-with-Naughton is a village and civil parish in the Babergh District of Suffolk, England. It contains 30 listed buildings that are recorded in the National Heritage List for England. Of these two are grade I, one is grade II* and 27 are grade II.

This list is based on the information retrieved online from Historic England.

== Key ==
| Grade | Criteria |
|---|---|
| I | Buildings that are of exceptional interest |
| II* | Particularly important buildings of more than special interest |
| II | Buildings that are of special interest |

== Listing ==
| Name | Grade | Location | Type | Completed (Note: The date given is the date used by Historic England as significant for the initial building or that of an important part in the structure's description.) | Date designated | Grid ref. (Note: The grid reference is based on the British national grid reference system, sometimes known as OSGB36, used by the Ordnance Survey.) Geo-coordinates | Notes | Entry number (Note: The "List Entry Number" is a unique number assigned to each listed building and scheduled monument by Historic England.) | Image | Wikidata |
|---|---|---|---|---|---|---|---|---|---|---|
| Hill Farmhouse | II | | | | 10 July 1980 | TM0088949095; 52°06′13″N 0°55′55″E | | 1037064 | Upload Photo | Q26288760 |
| The Bungalow | II | | | | 10 July 1980 | TM0067948969; 52°06′10″N 0°55′43″E | | 1351558 | Upload Photo | Q26634648 |
| Willow Cottage | II | | | | 10 July 1980 | TM0060048907; 52°06′08″N 0°55′39″E | | 1037065 | Upload Photo | Q26288761 |
| Plumtree Cottage and Crocus Cottage | II | Ipswich Road, Nedging With Naughton, Ipswich, IP7 7DA, Naughton | | | 10 July 1980 | TM0300149272; 52°06′16″N 0°57′46″E | | 1182206 | Upload Photo | Q26477471 |
| Barn to the West of Naughton Hall | II | Naughton | | | 10 July 1980 | TM0222848992; 52°06′08″N 0°57′05″E | | 1182181 | Upload Photo | Q26477451 |
| Brickhouse Farmhouse | II* | Naughton | | | 10 July 1980 | TM0289248998; 52°06′08″N 0°57′40″E | | 1037104 | Upload Photo | Q17533251 |
| Church of St Mary | I | Naughton | church building | | 23 January 1958 | TM0224648932; 52°06′06″N 0°57′06″E | | 1284646 | Church of St Mary More images | Q17542314 |
| Cooper's Farmhouse | II | Naughton | | | 10 July 1980 | TM0247049196; 52°06′14″N 0°57′18″E | | 1182196 | Upload Photo | Q26477464 |
| Ladies Cottage | II | Naughton | | | 10 July 1980 | TM0231648866; 52°06′04″N 0°57′09″E | | 1351536 | Upload Photo | Q26634627 |
| Naughton Hall | II | Naughton | building | | 23 January 1958 | TM0227249018; 52°06′09″N 0°57′07″E | | 1037102 | Naughton Hall More images | Q26288800 |
| Pond Cottage | II | Naughton | | | 10 July 1980 | TM0245749128; 52°06′12″N 0°57′17″E | | 1182189 | Upload Photo | Q26477458 |
| The Cottage | II | Naughton | | | 16 February 1976 | TM0243349123; 52°06′12″N 0°57′16″E | | 1037103 | Upload Photo | Q26288801 |
| Underwood Grange | II | Naughton | | | 10 July 1980 | TM0362249351; 52°06′18″N 0°58′19″E | | 1037105 | Upload Photo | Q26288802 |
| Wheelers Arms Inn | II | Naughton | thatched pub | | 16 February 1976 | TM0243349106; 52°06′12″N 0°57′16″E | | 1351535 | Wheelers Arms Inn More images | Q26634626 |
| Barn to the West of Vine Farmhouse | II | Nedging Road | | | 10 July 1980 | TM0091649145; 52°06′15″N 0°55′56″E | | 1037063 | Upload Photo | Q26288759 |
| Church of St Mary | I | Nedging Road | church building | | 23 January 1958 | TL9984948202; 52°05′46″N 0°54′58″E | | 1351560 | Church of St Mary More images | Q17542483 |
| Prospect House | II | Nedging Road | | | 10 July 1980 | TM0048948775; 52°06′03″N 0°55′33″E | | 1351559 | Upload Photo | Q26634649 |
| The Old Mill House | II | Nedging Road | | | 10 July 1980 | TM0155149506; 52°06′26″N 0°56′30″E | | 1182211 | Upload Photo | Q26477475 |
| The Thatched Cottage | II | Nedging Road | | | 10 July 1980 | TL9996648290; 52°05′48″N 0°55′05″E | | 1037066 | Upload Photo | Q26288762 |
| The Thatches | II | Nedging Road | | | 10 July 1980 | TM0113149245; 52°06′18″N 0°56′08″E | | 1037062 | Upload Photo | Q26288758 |
| Vine Cottage | II | Nedging Road | | | 10 July 1980 | TM0113349292; 52°06′19″N 0°56′08″E | | 1037106 | Upload Photo | Q26288804 |
| Vine Farmhouse | II | Nedging Road | | | 10 July 1980 | TM0094449160; 52°06′15″N 0°55′58″E | | 1351557 | Upload Photo | Q26634647 |
| Braemar | II | Nedging Tye | | | 10 July 1980 | TM0225249535; 52°06′26″N 0°57′07″E | | 1037067 | Upload Photo | Q26288763 |
| Jasmine Cottage | II | Nedging Tye | | | 10 July 1980 | TM0188749794; 52°06′35″N 0°56′49″E | | 1037068 | Upload Photo | Q26288764 |
| Lavender Cottage | II | Nedging Tye | | | 10 July 1980 | TM0186449817; 52°06′35″N 0°56′47″E | | 1037069 | Upload Photo | Q26288765 |
| Tye Cottage | II | Nedging Tye | | | 10 July 1980 | TM0216349633; 52°06′29″N 0°57′03″E | | 1182227 | Upload Photo | Q26477490 |
| High Tree Farmhouse | II | Semer Road | | | 10 July 1980 | TM0173448275; 52°05′46″N 0°56′37″E | | 1037070 | Upload Photo | Q26288766 |
| Naughton Manor House | II | Semer Road | | | 10 July 1980 | TM0212148712; 52°05′59″N 0°56′59″E | | 1284610 | Upload Photo | Q26573363 |
| Appletree House | II | Straight Road | | | 10 July 1980 | TM0279548280; 52°05′44″N 0°57′33″E | | 1037071 | Upload Photo | Q26288768 |
| The Old House | II | Straight Road | | | 10 July 1980 | TM0248648778; 52°06′01″N 0°57′18″E | | 1182257 | Upload Photo | Q26477518 |

== See also ==
- Grade I listed buildings in Suffolk
- Grade II* listed buildings in Suffolk

== Sources ==
- Bettely, James; Pevsner, Nikolaus (2015) [1961], Suffolk: West, The Buildings of England, New Haven and London: Yale University Press, ISBN 978-0-300-19655-9
