= Listed buildings in Little Waldingfield =

Civil Parish in Suffolk, England

Little Waldingfield is a village and civil parish in the Babergh District of Suffolk, England. It contains 25 listed buildings that are recorded in the National Heritage List for England. Of these one is grade I and 24 are grade II.

This list is based on the information retrieved online from Historic England.

== Key ==
Grade	Criteria
I	Buildings that are of exceptional interest
II*	Particularly important buildings of more than special interest
II	Buildings that are of special interest

== Listing ==
Name	Grade	Location	Type	Completed (Note: The date given is the date used by Historic England as significant for the initial building or that of an important part in the structure's description.)	Date designated	Grid ref. (Note: The grid reference is based on the British national grid reference system, sometimes known as OSGB36, used by the Ordnance Survey.) Geo-coordinates	Notes	Entry number (Note: The "List Entry Number" is a unique number assigned to each listed building and scheduled monument by Historic England.)	Image	Wikidata
Archers Farmhouse	II				9 February 1978	TL9298044562; 52°03′57″N 0°48′50″E		1351793	Upload Photo	Q26634863
Little Waldingfield War Memorial	II	CO10 0SW	war memorial		1 April 2020	TL9240145145; 52°04′16″N 0°48′21″E		1466686	Little Waldingfield War Memorial More images	Q97457200
Slough Hall	II				3 February 1987	TL9395944412; 52°03′51″N 0°49′41″E		1234081	Upload Photo	Q26527505
1 and 2, Church Road	II	1 and 2, Church Road, CO10 0SN			9 February 1978	TL9230045186; 52°04′18″N 0°48′16″E		1036565	Upload Photo	Q26288247
Church of St Lawrence	I	Church Road	church building		23 March 1961	TL9241745158; 52°04′17″N 0°48′22″E		1181618	Church of St Lawrence More images	Q17542189
Churchside	II	Church Road			10 January 1953	TL9238445162; 52°04′17″N 0°48′20″E		1036564	Upload Photo	Q26288246
Pink Cottage	II	Church Road			9 February 1978	TL9254945035; 52°04′13″N 0°48′29″E		1351794	Upload Photo	Q26634864
The Priory	II	Church Road			10 January 1953	TL9237045119; 52°04′16″N 0°48′19″E		1284913	Upload Photo	Q26573647
Priory Farmhouse	II	Priory Green	farmhouse		23 January 1958	TL9404943792; 52°03′31″N 0°49′45″E		1194553	Priory Farmhouse More images	Q26489174
Barn to the North of Maltings Farmhouse	II	The Street			9 February 1978	TL9246845556; 52°04′30″N 0°48′25″E		1036568	Upload Photo	Q26288251
Barn to the South West of Maltings Farmhouse	II	The Street			9 February 1978	TL9244445505; 52°04′28″N 0°48′24″E		1181667	Upload Photo	Q26476970
Brand Cottage and Butchers Cottage	II	The Street, CO10 0SQ			9 February 1978	TL9228845183; 52°04′18″N 0°48′15″E		1036572	Upload Photo	Q26288255
Enniskillen	II	The Street			9 February 1978	TL9228445230; 52°04′19″N 0°48′15″E		1351795	Upload Photo	Q26634865
K6 Telephone Kiosk	II	The Street			5 April 1994	TL9230745227; 52°04′19″N 0°48′16″E		1234160	Upload Photo	Q26527580
Maltings Cottage	II	The Street			9 February 1978	TL9258545604; 52°04′31″N 0°48′32″E		1284894	Upload Photo	Q26573629
Maltings Farmhouse	II	The Street			10 January 1953	TL9248845519; 52°04′28″N 0°48′26″E		1181657	Upload Photo	Q26476960
Morning Dawn and Kiln Cottage	II	The Street			9 February 1978	TL9223745147; 52°04′17″N 0°48′12″E		1284899	Upload Photo	Q26573634
Park Farmhouse	II	The Street			9 February 1978	TL9204245042; 52°04′14″N 0°48′02″E		1036566	Upload Photo	Q26288248
Stores Cottage	II	The Street			9 February 1978	TL9233845270; 52°04′21″N 0°48′18″E		1036571	Upload Photo	Q26288254
Swan Inn	II	The Street	inn		9 February 1978	TL9224945208; 52°04′19″N 0°48′13″E		1181644	Swan Inn More images	Q26476949
The Cottage	II	The Street			9 February 1978	TL9251645526; 52°04′29″N 0°48′28″E		1036569	Upload Photo	Q26288252
The Grange	II	The Street			9 February 1978	TL9205345014; 52°04′13″N 0°48′03″E		1181691	Upload Photo	Q26476994
The Old Vicarage	II	The Street			9 February 1978	TL9254845554; 52°04′30″N 0°48′30″E		1036570	Upload Photo	Q26288253
White Horse Inn	II	The Street			9 February 1978	TL9222745136; 52°04′16″N 0°48′12″E		1036573	Upload Photo	Q26288256
Wood Hall Farmhouse	II	The Street			23 March 1961	TL9240845460; 52°04′27″N 0°48′22″E		1036567	Upload Photo	Q26288249

== See also ==
- Grade I listed buildings in Suffolk
- Grade II* listed buildings in Suffolk

== Sources ==
- Bettely, James; Pevsner, Nikolaus (2015) [1961], Suffolk: West, The Buildings of England, New Haven and London: Yale University Press, ISBN 978-0-300-19655-9
