= Listed buildings in Boxford, Suffolk =

Civil Parish in England

Boxford is a village and civil parish in the Babergh District of Suffolk, England. It contains 87 listed buildings that are recorded in the National Heritage List for England. Of these one is grade I, one is grade II* and 85 are grade II.

This list is based on the information retrieved online from Historic England.

== Key ==
Grade	Criteria
I	Buildings that are of exceptional interest
II*	Particularly important buildings of more than special interest
II	Buildings that are of special interest

== Listing ==
Name	Grade	Location	Type	Completed (Note: The date given is the date used by Historic England as significant for the initial building or that of an important part in the structure's description.)	Date designated	Grid ref. (Note: The grid reference is based on the British national grid reference system, sometimes known as OSGB36, used by the Ordnance Survey.) Geo-coordinates	Notes	Entry number (Note: The "List Entry Number" is a unique number assigned to each listed building and scheduled monument by Historic England.)	Image	Wikidata
Peyton Hall (map Reference 967387)	II				23 January 1958	TL9668638685; 52°00′42″N 0°51′52″E		1286092	Upload Photo	Q26574729
Knollgate	II	Boxford Lane			10 July 1980	TL9621340418; 52°01′39″N 0°51′31″E		1351414	Upload Photo	Q26634523
The Old School House	II	Boxford Lane			23 January 1958	TL9614040303; 52°01′35″N 0°51′27″E		1193560	Upload Photo	Q26488217
Brick Kiln Hill Cottages	II	2 and 4, Brick Kiln Hill			10 July 1980	TL9612939262; 52°01′02″N 0°51′24″E		1351434	Upload Photo	Q26634541
Belsize the Close	II	1, Broad Street			10 July 1980	TL9626440531; 52°01′42″N 0°51′34″E		1351437	Upload Photo	Q26634544
2 and 4 Broad Street	II	2 and 4, Broad Street			23 January 1958	TL9625740556; 52°01′43″N 0°51′34″E		1037388	Upload Photo	Q26289107
Graham House	II	6, Broad Street			23 January 1958	TL9627340561; 52°01′43″N 0°51′35″E		1351435	Upload Photo	Q26634542
Riverside House	II	7 and 9, Broad Street			23 January 1958	TL9629340529; 52°01′42″N 0°51′36″E		1037392	Upload Photo	Q26289110
The Fleece Hotel	II*	8 and 10, Broad Street	hotel		23 January 1958	TL9629040564; 52°01′43″N 0°51′36″E		1037389	The Fleece Hotel More images	Q17533500
White Hart Inn	II	11, Broad Street			23 January 1958	TL9632940550; 52°01′43″N 0°51′38″E		1351398	Upload Photo	Q26634506
12 and 14, Broad Street	II	12 and 14, Broad Street			23 January 1958	TL9630440569; 52°01′44″N 0°51′36″E		1037390	Upload Photo	Q26289108
18 and 20, Broad Street	II	18 and 20, Broad Street			23 January 1958	TL9633340593; 52°01′44″N 0°51′38″E		1351436	Upload Photo	Q26634543
Kemball House	II	22, Broad Street			23 January 1958	TL9633440602; 52°01′45″N 0°51′38″E		1037391	Upload Photo	Q26289109
K6 Telephone Kiosk	II	Broad Street			14 February 1989	TL9630940550; 52°01′43″N 0°51′37″E		1037017	Upload Photo	Q26288701
Old Gaol	II	Broad Street	architectural structure		10 July 1980	TL9630440546; 52°01′43″N 0°51′36″E		1193614	Old Gaol More images	Q26488264
The Maltings	II	2, Butcher's Lane			23 January 1958	TL9635640613; 52°01′45″N 0°51′39″E		1037393	Upload Photo	Q26289111
4 and 6, Butcher's Lane	II	4 and 6, Butcher's Lane			23 January 1958	TL9636740617; 52°01′45″N 0°51′40″E		1193620	Upload Photo	Q26488269
Sunny Bank	II	Butcher's Lane			10 July 1980	TL9646140778; 52°01′50″N 0°51′45″E		1037394	Upload Photo	Q26289112
Street Farmhouse	II	1 and 2, Calais Street			10 July 1980	TL9736239939; 52°01′22″N 0°52′30″E		1193625	Upload Photo	Q26488273
Corner Cottage	II	Calais Street			10 July 1980	TL9736939907; 52°01′21″N 0°52′31″E		1193630	Upload Photo	Q26488278
Fourways	II	Calais Street			10 July 1980	TL9740439905; 52°01′21″N 0°52′33″E		1037395	Upload Photo	Q26289113
1 and 3, Church Street	II	1 and 3, Church Street			23 January 1958	TL9621840510; 52°01′42″N 0°51′32″E		1286088	Upload Photo	Q26574725
5, Church Street	II	5, Church Street			23 January 1958	TL9622640501; 52°01′42″N 0°51′32″E		1037397	Upload Photo	Q26289114
The Old Chequers	II	7, Church Street			23 January 1958	TL9622640480; 52°01′41″N 0°51′32″E		1037398	Upload Photo	Q26289115
The Old Forge	II	9 and 11, Church Street			23 January 1958	TL9622540467; 52°01′40″N 0°51′32″E		1193643	Upload Photo	Q26488290
13, Church Street	II	13, Church Street			10 July 1980	TL9622840455; 52°01′40″N 0°51′32″E		1037399	Upload Photo	Q26289116
15, Church Street	II	15, Church Street			10 July 1980	TL9622840448; 52°01′40″N 0°51′32″E		1193649	Upload Photo	Q26488297
Church of St Mary	I	Church Street	church building		23 January 1958	TL9626140491; 52°01′41″N 0°51′34″E		1037396	Church of St Mary More images	Q17541994
War Memorial in St Marys Churchyard	II	Church Street	war memorial		24 September 2003	TL9625540509; 52°01′42″N 0°51′34″E		1390730	War Memorial in St Marys Churchyard More images	Q26670111
Cox Farmhouse	II	Cox Hill			23 January 1958	TL9700841104; 52°02′00″N 0°52′14″E		1037400	Upload Photo	Q26289118
Peyton House	II	2, Ellis Street			10 July 1980	TL9639240602; 52°01′45″N 0°51′41″E		1193660	Upload Photo	Q26488307
Riverhall	II	3, Ellis Street			23 January 1958	TL9648440560; 52°01′43″N 0°51′46″E		1037403	Upload Photo	Q26289121
Greenbank	II	5, Ellis Street			23 January 1958	TL9652140530; 52°01′42″N 0°51′48″E		1193681	Upload Photo	Q26488326
6, Ellis Street	II	6, Ellis Street			10 July 1980	TL9647540586; 52°01′44″N 0°51′45″E		1037401	Upload Photo	Q26289119
8 and 10, Ellis Street	II	8 and 10, Ellis Street			10 July 1980	TL9648740582; 52°01′44″N 0°51′46″E		1193664	Upload Photo	Q26488309
16 and 18, Ellis Street	II	16 and 18, Ellis Street			23 January 1958	TL9651240570; 52°01′43″N 0°51′47″E		1351399	Upload Photo	Q26634507
22, 24 and 26, Ellis Street	II	22, 24 and 26, Ellis Street			10 July 1980	TL9653740541; 52°01′42″N 0°51′48″E		1193677	Upload Photo	Q26488323
Hillside Rosalee	II	40, Ellis Street			10 July 1980	TL9659740487; 52°01′41″N 0°51′52″E		1037402	Upload Photo	Q26289120
Thatch End	II	1, Stone Street			10 July 1980	TL9645239786; 52°01′18″N 0°51′42″E		1351400	Upload Photo	Q26634509
Glovers	II	2-6, Stone Street			23 January 1958	TL9644439766; 52°01′17″N 0°51′42″E		1037405	Upload Photo	Q26289123
The Little House	II	8, Stone Street			10 July 1980	TL9644639755; 52°01′17″N 0°51′42″E		1037406	Upload Photo	Q26289124
Compasses Inn	II	11, Stone Street	inn		23 January 1958	TL9646639715; 52°01′16″N 0°51′43″E		1286037	Compasses Inn More images	Q26574677
13, Stone Street	II	13, Stone Street			23 January 1958	TL9646839678; 52°01′15″N 0°51′43″E		1037404	Upload Photo	Q26289122
Renaissance Cottage	II	15, Stone Street, Sudbury, CO10 5NR			23 January 1958	TL9646639663; 52°01′14″N 0°51′43″E		1193696	Upload Photo	Q26488341
17 and 19, Stone Street	II	17 and 19, Stone Street			23 January 1958	TL9646439651; 52°01′14″N 0°51′43″E		1351401	Upload Photo	Q26634510
Balham House	II	22, Stone Street			10 July 1980	TL9645239699; 52°01′15″N 0°51′42″E		1193706	Upload Photo	Q26488351
The Firs	II	24, Stone Street			23 January 1958	TL9645239695; 52°01′15″N 0°51′42″E		1351402	Upload Photo	Q26634511
25 and 27, Stone Street	II	25 and 27, Stone Street			10 July 1980	TL9640539583; 52°01′12″N 0°51′40″E		1193703	Upload Photo	Q26488348
26-30, Stone Street	II	26-30, Stone Street			23 January 1958	TL9645339675; 52°01′15″N 0°51′42″E		1193710	Upload Photo	Q26488355
32 and 34, Stone Street	II	32 and 34, Stone Street			10 July 1980	TL9641239618; 52°01′13″N 0°51′40″E		1037407	Upload Photo	Q26289125
K6 Telephone Kiosk	II	Stone Street			29 July 1992	TL9646639729; 52°01′16″N 0°51′43″E		1036977	Upload Photo	Q26288654
Boxford House	II	Stone Street Road			10 July 1980	TL9613540192; 52°01′32″N 0°51′27″E		1193712	Upload Photo	Q26488357
Dovecote to the North of Parsonage Farmhouse	II	Stone Street Road			10 July 1980	TL9638640180; 52°01′31″N 0°51′40″E		1193715	Upload Photo	Q26488360
Parsonage Farmhouse	II	Stone Street Road			10 July 1980	TL9638440151; 52°01′30″N 0°51′40″E		1351403	Upload Photo	Q26634512
Bridge House and Boxford Stores	II	1, Swan Street			17 October 1975	TL9623440534; 52°01′43″N 0°51′33″E		1037370	Upload Photo	Q26289088
2 and 4 Swan Street	II	2 and 4, Swan Street			10 July 1980	TL9624040561; 52°01′43″N 0°51′33″E		1037408	Upload Photo	Q26289126
3 and 5, Swan Street	II	3 and 5, Swan Street			10 July 1980	TL9622840546; 52°01′43″N 0°51′32″E		1351428	Upload Photo	Q26634536
7 Swan Street	II	7, Swan Street			10 July 1980	TL9622140557; 52°01′43″N 0°51′32″E		1037371	Upload Photo	Q26289089
Hendrick House	II	9, Swan Street			23 January 1958	TL9620740566; 52°01′44″N 0°51′31″E		1193760	Upload Photo	Q26488403
11 and 13 Swan Street	II	11, Swan Street, CO10 5NZ			23 January 1958	TL9619440575; 52°01′44″N 0°51′31″E		1037372	Upload Photo	Q26289090
12 Swan Street	II	12, Swan Street			23 January 1958	TL9621340583; 52°01′44″N 0°51′32″E		1193720	Upload Photo	Q26488365
15 Swan Street	II	15, Swan Street			23 January 1958	TL9618840579; 52°01′44″N 0°51′30″E		1193769	Upload Photo	Q26488412
16-20 Swan Street	II	16-20, Swan Street			23 January 1958	TL9619440594; 52°01′45″N 0°51′31″E		1037365	Upload Photo	Q26289082
Swan Inn	II	17, Swan Street			23 January 1958	TL9618040583; 52°01′44″N 0°51′30″E		1037373	Upload Photo	Q26289091
19 Swan Street	II	19, Swan Street			23 January 1958	TL9616940588; 52°01′44″N 0°51′29″E		1286005	Upload Photo	Q26574649
Penn Cottage and the Old Castle House	II	21, Swan Street			10 July 1980	TL9616140595; 52°01′45″N 0°51′29″E		1037374	Upload Photo	Q26289093
22 Swan Street	II	22, Swan Street			10 July 1980	TL9618540600; 52°01′45″N 0°51′30″E		1037366	Upload Photo	Q26289083
24 Swan Street	II	24, Swan Street			10 July 1980	TL9617840606; 52°01′45″N 0°51′30″E		1351425	Upload Photo	Q26634533
Victoria Cottage	II	25, Swan Street			10 July 1980	TL9615440601; 52°01′45″N 0°51′29″E		1037375	Upload Photo	Q26289094
26 Swan Street	II	26, Swan Street			10 July 1980	TL9617340610; 52°01′45″N 0°51′30″E		1037367	Upload Photo	Q26289084
27 Swan Street	II	27, Swan Street			10 July 1980	TL9615040607; 52°01′45″N 0°51′28″E		1193804	Upload Photo	Q26488449
28 and 30 Swan Street	II	28 and 30, Swan Street			10 July 1980	TL9616640615; 52°01′45″N 0°51′29″E		1351426	Upload Photo	Q26634534
Commerce House	II	29, Swan Street			23 January 1958	TL9613840615; 52°01′45″N 0°51′28″E		1037376	Upload Photo	Q26289095
31 and 33 Swan Street	II	31 and 33, Swan Street			10 July 1980	TL9612740627; 52°01′46″N 0°51′27″E		1285973	Upload Photo	Q26574619
34 Swan Street	II	34, Swan Street			10 July 1980	TL9614240636; 52°01′46″N 0°51′28″E		1037368	Upload Photo	Q26289085
35 Swan Street	II	35, Swan Street			10 July 1980	TL9611940638; 52°01′46″N 0°51′27″E		1037377	Upload Photo	Q26289096
37 and 39 Swan Street	II	37 and 39, Swan Street			10 July 1980	TL9610540653; 52°01′47″N 0°51′26″E		1285978	Upload Photo	Q26574623
41 Swan Street	II	41, Swan Street			10 July 1980	TL9609940662; 52°01′47″N 0°51′26″E		1037378	Upload Photo	Q26289097
43 and 45 Swan Street	II	43 and 45, Swan Street			10 July 1980	TL9608940673; 52°01′47″N 0°51′25″E		1193829	Upload Photo	Q26488471
Wynne House	II	46, Swan Street			23 January 1958	TL9608140714; 52°01′49″N 0°51′25″E		1351427	Upload Photo	Q26634535
47, Swan Street	II	47, Swan Street			10 July 1980	TL9608040682; 52°01′48″N 0°51′25″E		1037379	Upload Photo	Q26289098
Edwardstone Almshouses	II	57-61, Swan Street			10 July 1980	TL9605440710; 52°01′48″N 0°51′24″E		1037380	Upload Photo	Q26289099
Barn Immediately South East of Goodlands Farmhouse	II	Swan Street			7 January 1991	TL9604140666; 52°01′47″N 0°51′23″E		1234888	Upload Photo	Q26528260
The Old Manse	II	Swan Street			10 July 1980	TL9601440759; 52°01′50″N 0°51′22″E		1351429	Upload Photo	Q26634537
United Reformed Church	II	Swan Street			10 July 1980	TL9601940731; 52°01′49″N 0°51′22″E		1285985	Upload Photo	Q26574630
No. 1 Cherry Ground Cottages	II	Wash Lane, CO10 5JE			10 July 1980	TL9688839601; 52°01′12″N 0°52′05″E		1193840	Upload Photo	Q26488484

== See also ==
- Grade I listed buildings in Suffolk
- Grade II* listed buildings in Suffolk

== Sources ==
- Bettely, James; Pevsner, Nikolaus (2015) [1961], Suffolk: West, The Buildings of England, New Haven and London: Yale University Press, ISBN 978-0-300-19655-9
