= Groton, Suffolk =

Village in Suffolk, England

Coordinates: 52.038°N 0.857°E

Groton
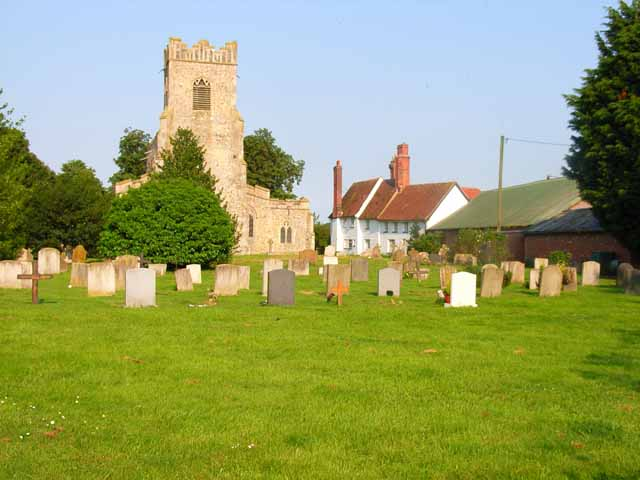
- St Bartholomew's Church, Groton

- Location within Suffolk
- Area: 6.239 km^{2} (2.409 sq mi)
- Population: 299 (2021 census)
  - Density: 48/km^{2} (120/sq mi)
- Civil parish: Groton
- District: Babergh
- Shire county: Suffolk
- Region: East
- Country: England
- Sovereign state: United Kingdom
- Post town: Sudbury
- Postcode district: CO10
- UK Parliament: South Suffolk

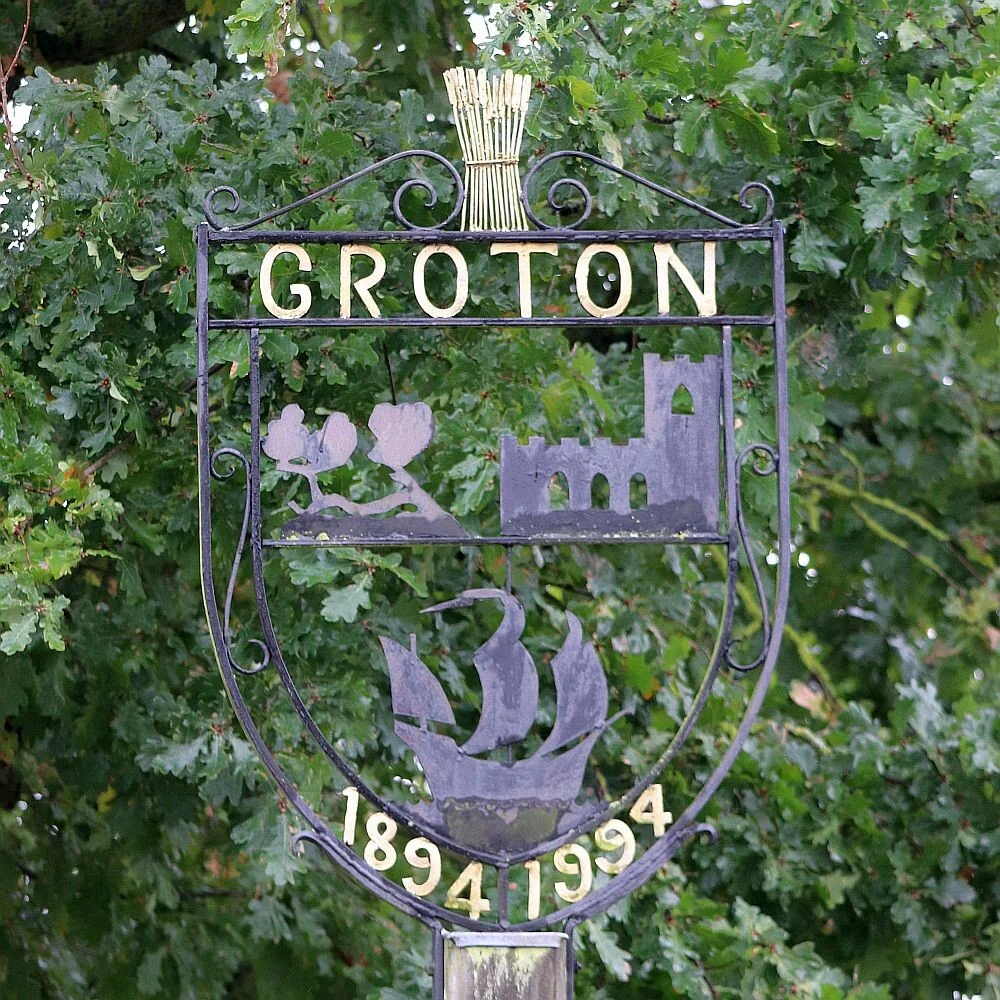
Groton village sign

Groton is a village and civil parish in the Babergh district, Suffolk, England, located around a mile north of the A1071 between Hadleigh and Sudbury. In 2021 the parish had a population of 299.

The parish church is dedicated to Saint Bartholomew. The village has no shops but does have the pub the Fox and Hounds. In addition to Groton village, the parish contains the hamlets of Broad Street, Castling's Heath, Gosling Green, Horner's Green, and Parliament Heath. It is home to several Ancient Woodlands: the Groton Wood SSSI, the Mill Wood and Winding Wood nature reserves, and a section of Bull's Cross Wood (part of the Milden Thicks SSSI). Also found in the parish are a tributary to the River Box and Pitches Mount, the remaining earthworks of a wooden castle.

The parish borders Boxford, Edwardstone, Kersey, Lindsey and Milden. There are 21 listed buildings in Groton.

== History ==
The name "Groton" is derived from the Old English for 'Sandy or gravelly stream'. In 1086, Groton was listed in the Domesday Book as Grotena in the hundred of Babergh. The lord of the manor was originally the Abbot of Bury St Edmunds but, at the Dissolution, it was granted to the Winthrops. Groton, Massachusetts, is named after the village, as it was founded by a member of the Winthrop family. John Winthrop was born at Groton Manor in 1587; he became the leader of the Winthrop Fleet, a founder of the city of Boston, and one of the first Governors of the Massachusetts Bay Colony. The church has a Victorian stained glass window in his memory.

Groton, Connecticut, was also named after the village by Winthrop's son John Winthrop the Younger who settled in that area in 1646. On a common called "The Croft" in the village is an old Mulberry tree said to have been planted by Adam Winthrop, the grandfather of John the elder.

There are other locations named Groton in the United States, which are generally named after the Massachusetts town.

In 1894 it became part of Cosford Rural District which became part of the administrative county of West Suffolk in 1889. In 1974 it became part of Babergh non-metropolitan district in the non-metropolitan county of Suffolk.

== St Bartholomew's Church ==
The parish church is dedicated to Saint Bartholomew. It is flint faced and has some 15th-century features; it was heavily restored in the 19th century. It is a Commonwealth War Grave site. St Bartholomew's is a Grade I listed building.

== Broad Street ==
Broad Street a hamlet in the parish, it is located near Mill Green. It is also the location of Pytches Mount.

== Pitches Mount ==
In Groton Park, Pitches Mount or Pytches is an example of a Norman motte and bailey castle. It may have been built in the 12th Century by Adam de Cockfield. Only the motte or mound survives, which is 200 feet in diameter and covered in bushes and undergrowth. The name is thought by some to come from the Pecche family, who held Groton for the Abbot of Bury St Edmunds in 1200. It is more likely to be named after John Pytches who bought Groton Great House in 1805.

== Castling's Heath ==
Castling's Heath is a hamlet in the parish. It has a barn called Castling's Hall, which is also called Dove Barn, where weddings take place.

== Gosling Green ==
Gosling Green is a hamlet in the parish, It is just by Groton Wood SSSI.

== Notable residents ==
- John Winthrop (1587–1649), founder of Boston and second governor of the Massachusetts Bay Colony
- John Winthrop the Younger (1606–1676), governor of the Connecticut Colony.
- Elizabeth Fones (1610–1673), early settler in the Massachusetts Bay Colony and founder of Greenwich, Connecticut.
- Deane Winthrop (1623–1704), Puritan colonist and first settler of Nashoba Valley.
- Lord Frederick Beauclerk (1773-1850), a notable cricketer during the single-wicket era.
- Robert Longden (1817–1895), clergyman and a cricketer.
- Robert MacBryde (1913–1966), artist, had a studio with Robert Colquhoun during the 1950s.
- Robert Colquhoun (1914–1962), artist and partner of Robert MacBryde.
- Ruth Rendell (1930–2015), award-winning crime writer.
