= Robert Longden =

Robert Longden may refer to:

- Robert Longden (cricketer) (1817–1895), English clergyman and cricketer
- Robert Longden (actor) (born 1951), British composer, director and actor
