= Winding Wood =

Winding Wood may refer to the following places in England:

- Winding Wood, Berkshire, a hamlet and a wood in Berkshire near Clapton
- Winding Wood, Suffolk, a wood in Suffolk near Round Maple
