= Stow Mill, Paston =

Windmill in Paston, Norfolk, England

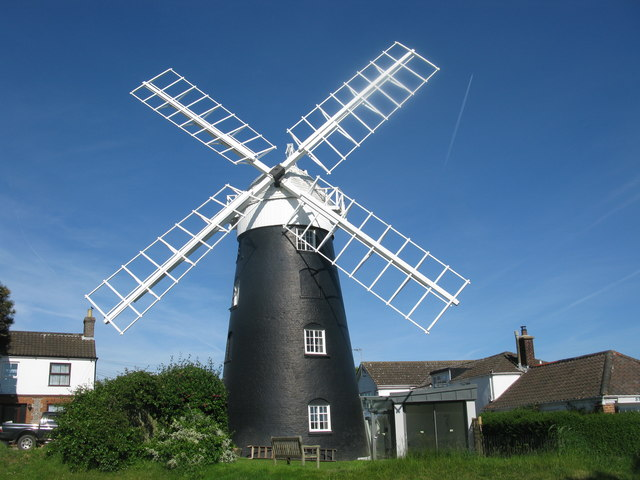
- Stow Mill, May 2017
- Interactive map of Stow Mill, Paston

Origin
- Mill name: Stow Mill
- Mill location: Paston, Norfolk, United Kingdom
- Grid reference: TG 3162 3578
- Coordinates: 52°52′11″N 1°26′23″E
- Year built: 1827

Information
- Purpose: Corn mill
- Type: Tower mill
- Storeys: Four storeys
- No. of sails: Four
- Type of sails: Common sails, later Patent sails
- Windshaft: Wood, later cast iron
- Winding: Fantail
- Fantail blades: Eight
- Auxiliary power: Steam engine
- No. of pairs of millstones: Two pairs, plus two pairs driven by steam
- Size of millstones: 4 feet 0 inches (1.22 m) diameter (as restored)

Stow Mill is a Grade II listed tower mill in Paston, Norfolk, United Kingdom. Built in 1827, the mill worked until 1930. It was then converted to residential accommodation. The mill has been restored so that the sails can turn.

== History ==
Stow Mill was built in 1827 for Thomas Gaze. There was a smock mill 1 3/4 miles (2.8 km) south of Stow Mill which was demolished in 1840. Some of its materials may have been installed in Stow Mill. Thomas Gaze Jr. was the owner in 1841. He worked the mill until his death in 1872. He had a 5hp steam engine installed, driving a further two pairs of millstones. The mill was offered for sale by auction in November 1872, but was not sold. It was worked by Gaze's son, William. The mill was conveyed to William Gaze on 30 December 1875. He worked the mill until his death in 1906. The mill was sold to Mary Ann Harper on 15 December 1906. On 3 April 1907, her cousin Thomas Pilgrim Gladby Livermore took the mill on a yearly tenancy. Two sails from Witard's Mill, Upper Hellesdon, Norwich were fitted to the mill at some point in the 1910s. Witard's mill had been severely damaged by fire in 1913 and was demolished in 1920. The sails were shortened by two bays to fit. Harper died on 2 January 1928, leaving the mill to Livermore. He worked the mill until 1930, selling it on 30 December to Cicely Margaret Bell.

Bell had the mill stripped of machinery and converted to residential use. All machinery below the brake wheel being removed. Rex Wailes had a bolter from the mill sent to the Science Museum, London. The mill was sold on 24 May 1938 to Douglas Sidney Arundel McDougall. The mill was listed Grade II on 16 April 1955. C. 1960, the mill was bought by Christopher Michael Boyd Newton. In 1961, restoration of the mill began with assistance from Norfolk County Council. Messrs. Thompsons, millwrights of Alford, Lincolnshire carried out the work. On 25 October 1977, the mill was leased to Norfolk County Council on a peppercorn rent by the owner Mr. Newton. The lease was terminated on 1 December 1981. In 1976, one of the mill's Columbian pine stocks was rotten, and it was removed with the intention of replacing it with a steel stock. On 11 September 1978, the other pair of sails were blown off the mill in a strong wind. The first steel stock and sails were erected on 27 September by Lennard & Lawn, millwrights of Caston, Norfolk. The second steel stock was fitted on 14 July 1981 by John Lawn. A replacement fantail was fitted about this time. The second pair of sails were fitted in June 1982. On 30 May 1983, an replacement upright shaft with wallower and crown wheel were fitted to the mill. These came from a tower mill at Houghton Conquest, Bedfordshire. A great spur wheel from Chalkrow Lane Mill, Gooderstone, Norfolk was acquired for later fitting to the mill, although it was never fitted. The great spur wheel was moved outside the mill in 2000 due to woodworm. It was rescued in 2020 and taken into storage. Two pairs of 4 feet 0 inches (1.22 m) diameter millstones were acquired. These came from a post mill at Nedging Tye, Suffolk, which had burnt down in 1909.

The mill was bought by Roger and Andrea Hough in January 1999. In October 2008, they sought planning permission to convert the mill to residential use. The Society for the Protection of Ancient Buildings lodged an objection to this proposal. Full restoration of the mill started in August 2018. the mill's cap was removed in spring 2019. Following repairs, it was replaced on the mill on 16 March 2020. New wooden stocks were fitted on 1 June and four new sails had been fitted by 5 June.

== Description ==
Stow Mill is a four storey tower mill. As built, it had a twelve-sided dome shape cap with a petticoat and gallery. The cap ran on a shot curb. Originally, four Common sails would have been carried on a wooden windshaft. The mill was originally painted white, as shown in a photograph dated c.1890. Later, it was tarred. Latterly, four double Patent sails were carried on a cast iron windshaft. The wooden brake wheel was of clasp arm construction. One pair of sails had seven bays of three shutters, the other pair had eight bays of three shutters. The mill was winded by an eight-bladed fantail. Two pairs of millstones were driven by wind, and two more by steam.
