= Hadleigh Hamlet =

Former civil parish in Suffolk, England

Coordinates: 52.040322°N 0.88218221°E

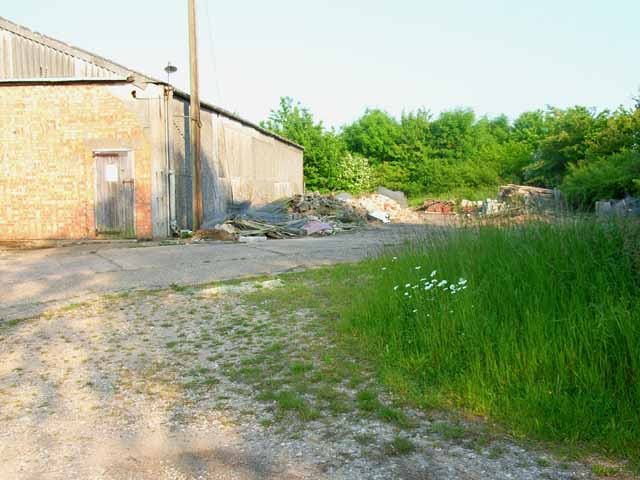
- Barn at Redhouse Farm, Wicker Street Green

- Location within Suffolk
- Civil parish: Boxford; Kersey
- District: Babergh
- Shire county: Suffolk
- Region: East
- Country: England
- Sovereign state: United Kingdom

Hadleigh Hamlet was formerly a civil parish in Suffolk, England. It included part of the village of Boxford and rural areas to the north-east of Boxford, including the hamlet of Wicker Street Green. The parish was abolished in 1935, when its area was divided between Boxford and Kersey.

== History ==
Hadleigh Hamlet was historically a detached part of the ancient parish and manor of Hadleigh. By the 16th century, Hadleigh Hamlet had become part of the ecclesiastical parish of Boxford, whilst remaining part of the manor of Hadleigh.

From the 17th century onwards, parishes were gradually given various civil functions under the poor laws, in addition to their original ecclesiastical functions. The civil functions were sometimes exercised by subdivisions of the parish rather than the parish as a whole, including at Hadleigh Hamlet, which had its own overseers of the poor. In 1866, the legal definition of 'parish' was changed to be the areas used for administering the poor laws, and so Hadleigh Hamlet became a civil parish.

In 1889 it became part of the administrative county of West Suffolk. When elected parish and district council were created in 1894 it became part of Cosford Rural District. On 1 April 1935 the parish was abolished. The majority of the area of the former parish, including Wicker Street Green, was added to Kersey parish. A smaller area was added to Boxford; the majority of the population was in the area added to Boxford, which included parts of Boxford village.

In 1931 (the last census before the abolition of the parish) Hadleigh Hamlet had a population of 153.

Boxford and Kersey both became part of the non-metropolitan district of Babergh in the non-metropolitan county of Suffolk in 1974.
