= Groton Wood =

Nature reserve in Suffolk, England

Coordinates: 52.051°N 0.882°E

- Site of Special Scientific Interest
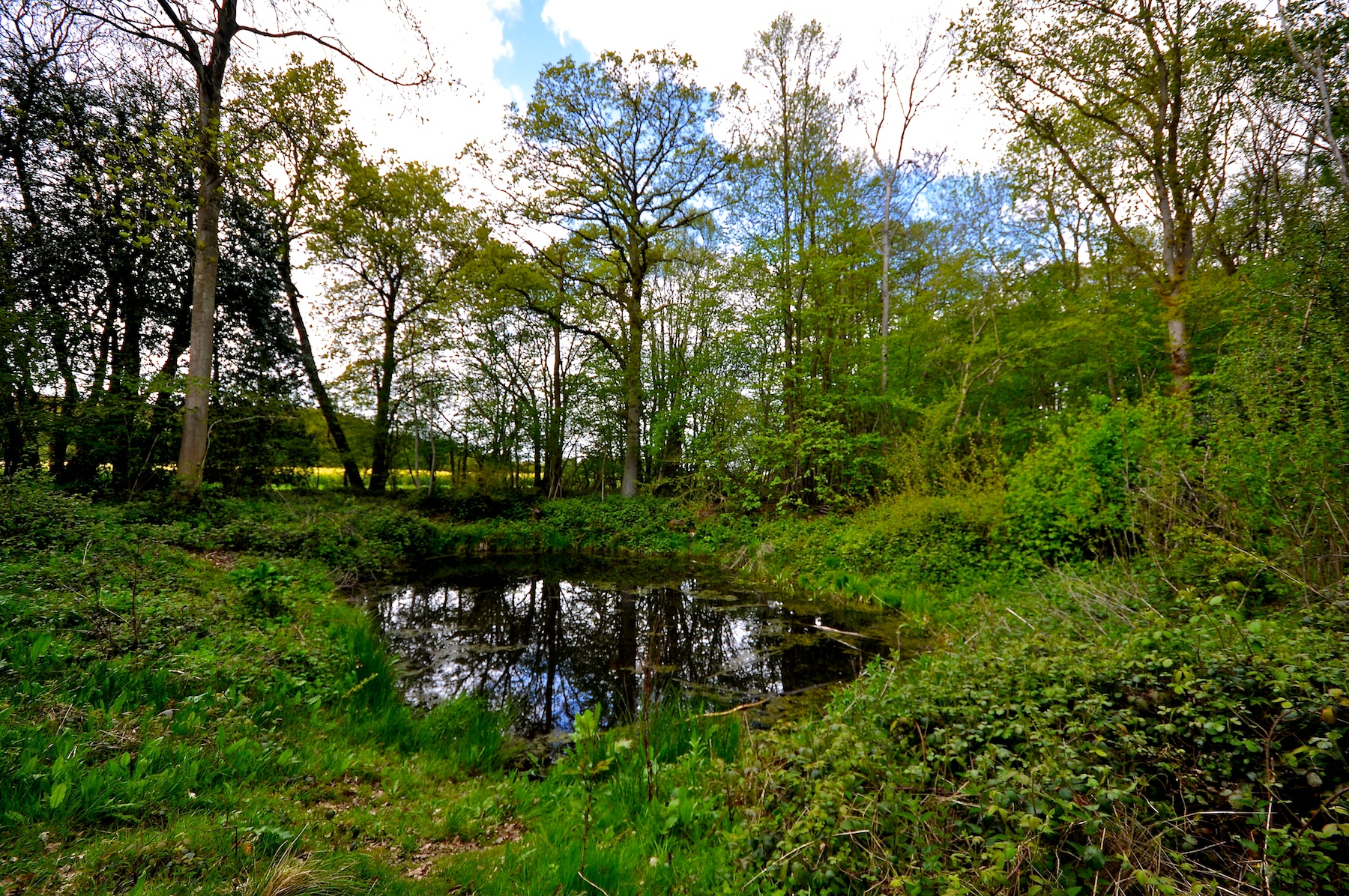
- Location of Groton Wood.
- Area of search: Suffolk
- Grid reference: TL 977 431
- Interest: Biological
- Area: 20.2 hectares
- Notification date: 1985
- Location map: Magic Map

Groton Wood is a 20.2-hectare (50-acre) biological Site of Special Scientific Interest north-east of Groton in Suffolk. It is owned and managed by the Suffolk Wildlife Trust.

Fifteen species of butterfly have been recorded in this wood, including brimstones, speckled woods and purple hairstreaks. There are many wild cherry trees, and twenty-two seasonal ponds, which have scarce and protected great crested newts.

There is access from Howe Road.
