= Naughton, Suffolk =

Village in Suffolk, England

Coordinates: 52.1023°N 0.9529°E

Naughton
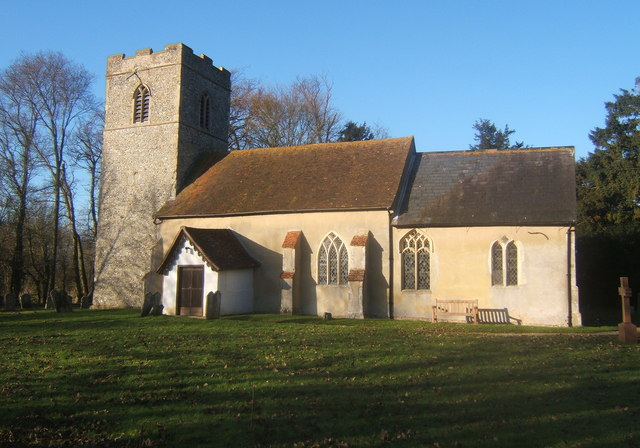

- Location within Suffolk
- OS grid reference: TM020480
- Civil parish: Nedging-with-Naughton
- District: Babergh
- Shire county: Suffolk
- Region: East
- Country: England
- Sovereign state: United Kingdom
- Post town: Ipswich
- Postcode district: IP7

Naughton is a village and former civil parish, now in the civil parish of Nedging-with-Naughton, in the Babergh district, in the county of Suffolk, England. It is 10 miles (16 km) north-west of Ipswich and 7 miles (11 km) south-west of Stowmarket. It was historically within the Cosford Hundred of Suffolk. The civil parish was merged with Nedging on 1 April 1935 to create "Nedging with Naughton". In 1931 the civil parish had a population of 98.

Naughton is formed from the junction of two roads, the Whatfield Road which comes in from the south-west and heads north to Nedging Tye and New Road which comes in from the south-east. St. Mary's church is a 14th-century flint built church stands at the centre of the village, just west of this junction.

== History ==
Sir Henry Adair was lord of the manor in the past.

== Present day ==
It lies just to the south of RAF Wattisham. There is one pub in the village, the Wheelhouse (formerly Wheeler's Arms), that dates from the 17th century.

There are four farms in the area: Cooper's Farm (to the north), Brickhouse Farm (to the east), Fidget's Farm (to the south-west), and High Tree Farm (to the south).
