= Listed buildings in Kersey, Suffolk =

Civil Parish in Suffolk, England

Kersey is a village and civil parish in the Babergh District of Suffolk, England. It contains 62 listed buildings that are recorded in the National Heritage List for England. Of these two are grade I, ten are grade II* and 49 are grade II.

This list is based on the information retrieved online from Historic England.

== Key ==
| Grade | Criteria |
|---|---|
| I | Buildings that are of exceptional interest |
| II* | Particularly important buildings of more than special interest |
| II | Buildings that are of special interest |

== Listing ==
| Name | Grade | Location | Type | Completed (Note: The date given is the date used by Historic England as significant for the initial building or that of an important part in the structure's description.) | Date designated | Grid ref. (Note: The grid reference is based on the British national grid reference system, sometimes known as OSGB36, used by the Ordnance Survey.) Geo-coordinates | Notes | Entry number (Note: The "List Entry Number" is a unique number assigned to each listed building and scheduled monument by Historic England.) | Image | Wikidata |
|---|---|---|---|---|---|---|---|---|---|---|
| Hall House | II | | | | 23 January 1958 | TM0008344009; 52°03′30″N 0°55′02″E | | 1351482 | Upload Photo | Q26634583 |
| Kersey Mill | II* | | mill | | 23 January 1958 | TM0127244430; 52°03′42″N 0°56′05″E | | 1180340 | Kersey Mill More images | Q17533612 |
| Kersey Vale Farmhouse | II | | | | 30 January 1981 | TM0026043062; 52°02′59″N 0°55′09″E | | 1037000 | Upload Photo | Q26288681 |
| Mill House | II* | | | | 23 January 1958 | TM0125444437; 52°03′42″N 0°56′04″E | | 1351458 | Upload Photo | Q17534376 |
| Outbuildings to the West of Mill House | II | | | | 17 October 1975 | TM0123544433; 52°03′42″N 0°56′03″E | | 1180343 | Upload Photo | Q26475554 |
| Priory Chapel (remains) | II | | | | 23 January 1958 | TL9989244436; 52°03′44″N 0°54′53″E | | 1037273 | Upload Photo | Q26288972 |
| Rushes Cottage | II | | | | 10 July 1980 | TM0081244729; 52°03′52″N 0°55′41″E | | 1180347 | Upload Photo | Q26475558 |
| The Priory | II | | | | 23 January 1958 | TL9984644454; 52°03′45″N 0°54′50″E | | 1037272 | Upload Photo | Q26288970 |
| 7, Church Hill | II | 7, Church Hill | | | 23 January 1958 | TM0013244032; 52°03′31″N 0°55′04″E | | 1037274 | Upload Photo | Q26288973 |
| Church Steps | II | Church Hill | | | 23 January 1958 | TM0017243981; 52°03′29″N 0°55′06″E | | 1285508 | Upload Photo | Q26574198 |
| Church of St Mary | I | Church Hill | church building | | 23 January 1958 | TM0020743946; 52°03′28″N 0°55′08″E | | 1351459 | Church of St Mary More images | Q15979421 |
| Cobblers Goose | II | Church Hill | | | 23 January 1958 | TM0012744014; 52°03′30″N 0°55′04″E | | 1037276 | Upload Photo | Q26288977 |
| Park Place | II | Church Hill | | | 10 July 1980 | TM0009944069; 52°03′32″N 0°55′03″E | | 1180359 | Upload Photo | Q26475575 |
| River House | II* | Church Hill | house | | 23 January 1958 | TM0006944111; 52°03′33″N 0°55′01″E | | 1234780 | River House More images | Q17534103 |
| River View | II | Church Hill | | | 23 January 1958 | TM0007344074; 52°03′32″N 0°55′01″E | | 1037234 | Upload Photo | Q26288933 |
| The Chapel House | II | Church Hill | | | 10 July 1980 | TM0011444060; 52°03′32″N 0°55′03″E | | 1351460 | Upload Photo | Q26634564 |
| The Cottage | II | Church Hill | | | 23 January 1958 | TM0009444047; 52°03′31″N 0°55′02″E | | 1285517 | Upload Photo | Q26683442 |
| The Little Manor | II* | Church Hill | manor house | | 23 January 1958 | TM0014143987; 52°03′29″N 0°55′05″E | | 1351461 | The Little Manor More images | Q17534395 |
| The Reading Room (kersey Village Produce Association) | II | Church Hill | | | 10 July 1980 | TM0008044071; 52°03′32″N 0°55′02″E | | 1351481 | Upload Photo | Q26634582 |
| View Leys | II | Church Hill | | | 23 January 1958 | TM0011844046; 52°03′31″N 0°55′04″E | | 1180354 | Upload Photo | Q26475568 |
| West View | II | Church Hill | | | 10 July 1980 | TM0010544062; 52°03′32″N 0°55′03″E | | 1037275 | Upload Photo | Q26288975 |
| Woodbine Cottage | II | Church Hill | | | 23 January 1958 | TM0013544003; 52°03′30″N 0°55′04″E | | 1285515 | Upload Photo | Q26574203 |
| Bridges Farmhouse | II | Kersey Tye | | | 5 March 1998 | TL9876943537; 52°03′16″N 0°53′52″E | | 1376752 | Upload Photo | Q26657277 |
| Boxford Road Farmhouse | II | Kersey Upland | | | 10 July 1980 | TL9902442956; 52°02′57″N 0°54′04″E | | 1351484 | Upload Photo | Q26634585 |
| Hart's Cottage | II | Kersey Upland | | | 10 July 1980 | TL9920542834; 52°02′53″N 0°54′13″E | | 1037239 | Upload Photo | Q26288938 |
| Sampson's Hall | II | Kersey Upland | | | 10 July 1980 | TL9947343262; 52°03′07″N 0°54′28″E | | 1180386 | Upload Photo | Q26475608 |
| The Forge | II | Kersey Upland | | | 10 July 1980 | TL9913342965; 52°02′57″N 0°54′10″E | | 1285487 | Upload Photo | Q26574177 |
| West Sampson's Hall | II | Kersey Upland | | | 10 July 1980 | TL9934643134; 52°03′03″N 0°54′21″E | | 1037240 | Upload Photo | Q26288939 |
| Ailsa Cottage Greenan | II* | The Green | thatched cottage | | 23 January 1958 | TM0005144050; 52°03′31″N 0°55′00″E | | 1037237 | Ailsa Cottage Greenan More images | Q17533420 |
| Ayres End | II | The Green | | | 23 January 1958 | TL9999744040; 52°03′31″N 0°54′57″E | | 1037238 | Upload Photo | Q26288937 |
| Green Gables | II | The Green | | | 23 January 1958 | TM0005644037; 52°03′31″N 0°55′00″E | | 1351483 | Upload Photo | Q26634584 |
| Olde Drift House | II | The Green | house | | 23 January 1958 | TM0009344017; 52°03′30″N 0°55′02″E | | 1037235 | Olde Drift House More images | Q26288935 |
| The Cottage | II | The Green | | | 10 July 1980 | TM0008644030; 52°03′31″N 0°55′02″E | | 1037236 | Upload Photo | Q26288936 |
| Mount Cottage | II | The Row | | | 10 July 1980 | TL9998844309; 52°03′40″N 0°54′57″E | | 1037241 | Upload Photo | Q26288940 |
| The Tapers and Bumble Cottage | II* | 2, The Street, Ipswich, IP7 6ED | | | 23 January 1958 | TM0000444180; 52°03′36″N 0°54′58″E | | 1351485 | Upload Photo | Q17534431 |
| 3 and 4, the Street | II* | 3 and 4, The Street | | | 23 January 1958 | TL9999944188; 52°03′36″N 0°54′58″E | | 1285468 | Upload Photo | Q17534160 |
| 5 and 6, the Street | II* | 5 and 6, The Street | | | 23 January 1958 | TL9999844202; 52°03′36″N 0°54′58″E | | 1037249 | Upload Photo | Q17533442 |
| Bellevue and Tenement Adjoining Bellevue on the South (owned by P S Ryde) | II | The Street | architectural structure | | 23 January 1958 | TM0003244164; 52°03′35″N 0°54′59″E | | 1285491 | Bellevue and Tenement Adjoining Bellevue on the South (owned by P S Ryde) More images | Q26574181 |
| Bouttles | II | The Street | | | 23 January 1958 | TL9999744253; 52°03′38″N 0°54′58″E | | 1285496 | Upload Photo | Q26574186 |
| Bridge House Riverside House | II | The Street | | | 23 January 1958 | TM0006044128; 52°03′34″N 0°55′01″E | | 1037242 | Upload Photo | Q26288941 |
| Brook Cottage | II | The Street | | | 23 January 1958 | TM0004544146; 52°03′34″N 0°55′00″E | | 1037243 | Upload Photo | Q26288942 |
| Carlton House | II | The Street | | | 23 January 1958 | TM0001844149; 52°03′35″N 0°54′59″E | | 1037248 | Upload Photo | Q26288947 |
| Corner House | II* | The Street | | | 23 January 1958 | TL9998844286; 52°03′39″N 0°54′57″E | | 1180414 | Upload Photo | Q17533647 |
| Cressland Kedges End | II* | The Street | | | 23 January 1958 | TM0002444133; 52°03′34″N 0°54′59″E | | 1037247 | Upload Photo | Q17533430 |
| Linton House | II | The Street | | | 10 July 1980 | TM0001444219; 52°03′37″N 0°54′58″E | | 1037245 | Upload Photo | Q26288944 |
| Numbers 1-4 Ancient Houses | I | The Street | building | | 23 January 1958 | TL9997644265; 52°03′38″N 0°54′57″E | | 1037250 | Numbers 1-4 Ancient Houses More images | Q17541886 |
| Numbers 1-4 Ancient Houses | I | The Street | | | 23 January 1958 | TL9998044254; 52°03′38″N 0°54′57″E | | 1180431 | Upload Photo | Q17542081 |
| Priory Holme | II | The Street | | | 10 July 1980 | TL9996144302; 52°03′40″N 0°54′56″E | | 1351486 | Upload Photo | Q26634586 |
| Quilly | II | The Street | | | 23 January 1958 | TM0002544175; 52°03′35″N 0°54′59″E | | 1037244 | Upload Photo | Q26288943 |
| Row View | II | The Street | | | 23 January 1958 | TL9996944279; 52°03′39″N 0°54′56″E | | 1180445 | Upload Photo | Q26475686 |
| Stone House | II | The Street | | | 23 January 1958 | TM0002044188; 52°03′36″N 0°54′59″E | | 1180399 | Upload Photo | Q26475623 |
| The Bell Inn | II | The Street | inn | | 23 January 1958 | TM0001244160; 52°03′35″N 0°54′58″E | | 1285465 | The Bell Inn More images | Q26574157 |
| Water Cottage | II | The Street | | | 23 January 1958 | TM0005144138; 52°03′34″N 0°55′00″E | | 1180393 | Upload Photo | Q26475616 |
| White Horse Inn | II | The Street | | | 23 January 1958 | TL9998944272; 52°03′39″N 0°54′57″E | | 1037246 | Upload Photo | Q26288946 |
| Vale Lane Corner | II | Vale Lane | | | 10 July 1980 | TM0039643633; 52°03′17″N 0°55′17″E | | 1037251 | Upload Photo | Q26288948 |
| Curtis Farmhouse | II | Wicker Street Green | | | 10 July 1980 | TL9809842241; 52°02′35″N 0°53′14″E | | 1285443 | Upload Photo | Q26574136 |
| Elm Farmhouse | II | Wicker Street Green | | | 10 July 1980 | TL9808842133; 52°02′32″N 0°53′13″E | | 1285442 | Upload Photo | Q26574135 |
| Hollies Cottage | II | Wicker Street Green | | | 10 July 1980 | TL9772542009; 52°02′28″N 0°52′54″E | | 1351487 | Upload Photo | Q26634587 |
| Lodge Farmhouse | II | Wicker Street Green | | | 10 July 1980 | TL9793642023; 52°02′29″N 0°53′05″E | | 1037252 | Upload Photo | Q26288949 |
| Red House Farmhouse | II | Wicker Street Green | | | 10 July 1980 | TL9778241854; 52°02′23″N 0°52′56″E | | 1180454 | Upload Photo | Q26475699 |
| Wicker Street House | II | Wicker Street Green | | | 10 July 1980 | TL9769441892; 52°02′25″N 0°52′52″E | | 1285440 | Upload Photo | Q26574133 |
| Manor Farmhouse | II | Williams Green | | | 10 July 1980 | TL9899942530; 52°02′44″N 0°54′02″E | | 1351488 | Upload Photo | Q26634588 |

== See also ==
- Grade I listed buildings in Suffolk
- Grade II* listed buildings in Suffolk

== Sources ==
- Bettely, James; Pevsner, Nikolaus (2015) [1961], Suffolk: West, The Buildings of England, New Haven and London: Yale University Press, ISBN 978-0-300-19655-9
