= Hagmore Green =

Hamlet in Suffolk, England

Coordinates: 52.0165°N 0.8455°E

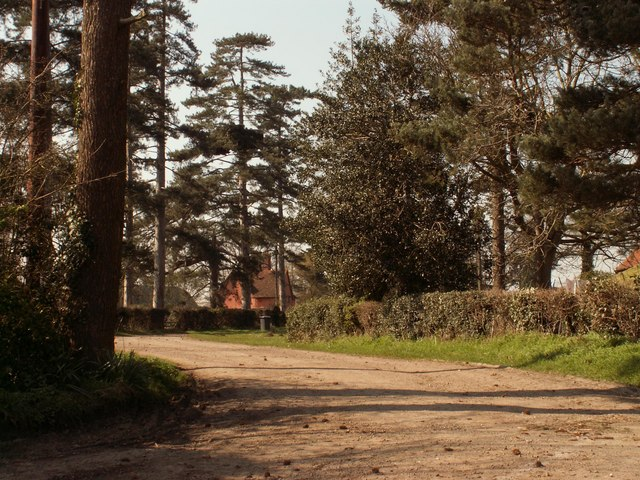
- Road to Firs Farm

- Location within Suffolk
- Civil parish: Boxford
- District: Babergh
- Shire county: Suffolk
- Region: East
- Country: England
- Sovereign state: United Kingdom

Hagmore Green is a hamlet in the civil parish of Boxford, in the Babergh district, in the county of Suffolk, England. The nearest village is Boxford, the A134 and A1071 roads are nearby.

== History ==
Hagmore Green was formerly called Hagmer.
