= Old Buckenham Hall School =

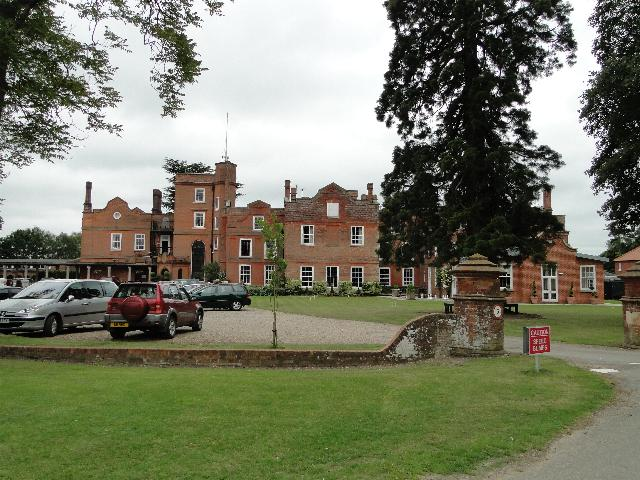

Location
- Brettenham Park; Brettenham, Suffolk, IP7 7PH; England; 52.1397°N 0.8585°E

Information
- Type: Preparatory day and boarding
- Motto: Spero (I hope)
- Established: 1862
- Founders: Ellen and Margaret Ringer
- Department for Education URN: 124873 Tables
- Chairman of Governors: Philip Howell
- Headmaster: James Large
- Gender: Coeducational
- Age: 2 to 13
- Enrolment: 220
- Houses: Jupiter, Mars, Mercury, Saturn
- Colour: Navy Blue
- Publication: The OBH Magazine
- Website: http://www.obh.co.uk

Old Buckenham Hall School (commonly known as OBH) is a day and boarding preparatory school with pre-prep for boys and girls in the village of Brettenham, Suffolk, England.

Founded in 1862, the school has been on its current site since 1956, and currently accommodates 250 girls and boys between the ages of 2 and 13 years.

The school is located in Brettenham Park, a grade II* listed building in 85 acres (340,000 m^{2}) of parkland in the Suffolk village of Brettenham. Its pupils take the Common Entrance exam, going on to a range of public schools such as Uppingham, Oundle, Harrow, Rugby, Framlingham and The Leys.

Since 5 January 2026, the school has been part of the Rugby Schools Group, which currently includes Bilton Grange School and Aysgarth School.

== History ==
The school was founded as a dame school in 1862 by Misses Ellen and Margaret Ringer in the Suffolk coastal town of Lowestoft in a terraced house on Wellington Esplanade. In 1872 they built South Lodge, and the school was known by the name 'South Lodge Preparatory School'. The school remained there for over 50 years before moving in 1936 to much larger premises at Old Buckenham Hall in the village of Old Buckenham, Norfolk, previously the residence of financier Lionel Robinson. In December 1952, disaster struck and the Hall was burnt down by fire. In January of the following year the school found new premises at Merton Hall near Thetford, Norfolk. Disaster struck again with a second fire in January 1956. After various options were considered, the school became aware that Brettenham Park in Suffolk had come onto the market and the property was acquired. The school, by then known as Old Buckenham Hall School, moved there in September 1956. The school has been on this site since, first taking on girls in the 1990s. It became fully co-educational in 1998.

The school celebrated its centenary in 1962, which included the commissioning of an anthem setting the text of Psalm 150 by Benjamin Britten, an alumnus. The work was also performed at the school's 150th anniversary celebrations in 2012.

== Present school ==
The School is currently divided into the three parts:

- Pre-Prep School (Nursery - Year 2)
- Middle School (Years 3 & 4)
- Prep School (Years 5 – 8)

The prep school is also split vertically into four houses:

- Jupiter
- Mars
- Mercury
- Saturn

These houses were chosen in the 1960s to link the Ancient Greeks and the Space Age.

== Facilities and activities ==
The school makes use of its sports pitches and facilities including three rugby pitches, two football pitches, five football and six hockey pitches, five cricket squares, seven tennis courts, two squash courts, all-weather netball courts, a 2,000-yard (1,800 m) nine-hole golf course, and an outdoor heated swimming pool. Pupils spend five of six afternoons a week playing games. Pupils at OBH play a wide variety of sports including rugby, hockey, cricket, tennis, football, athletics, gymnastics, cross country running, golf, swimming, and netball.

Being a predominantly day and transitional boarding school, the school offers a wide range of activities for the pupils including archery, sailing, and clay pigeon shooting.

The school has landscaped Japanese Gardens, located to the south of the Stable Yard. There are three ponds on the estate: the island pond, the mirror (South) pond and Dragonfly pond (in the Japanese Gardens). The school maintains an orchard, a historic arboretum, the big woods, two outdoor classrooms, owl boxes, beehives and also keeps chickens and ducks. The school's famous Thatched Pavilion played host to an England XI versus the touring Australian Ashes side in 1921 when it was located in Old Buckenham.

The main multi-purpose hall, the Britten Hall, is named for the school's most distinguished alumnus, Benjamin Britten.

The school is also home to the Brettenham Village Cricket Club and hosts an annual fireworks event for the local community.

== Notable former pupils ==
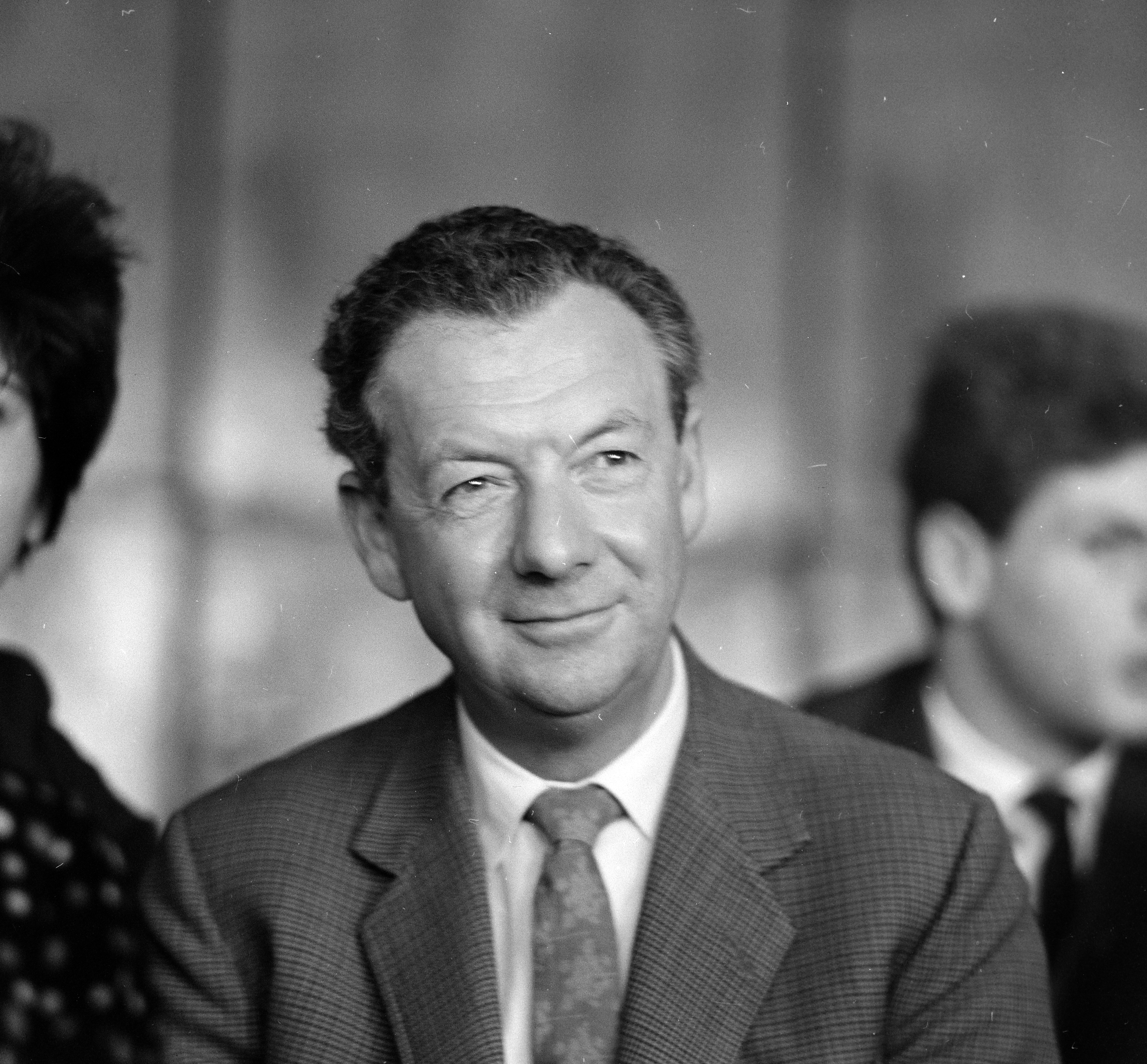
Benjamin Britten, alumnus of South Lodge School

- Jaime Alguersuari spent one year at the school
- W. J. Birkbeck, scholar of Russia, the Balkans and the Orthodox Church
- George Blagden, actor most famous for his starring role in the BBC series, Versailles
- Charles Bowman (Lord Mayor of London)
- Benjamin Britten, composer
- Robert Brooke-Popham, Governor of Singapore
- Harry Judd, drummer for McFly and McBusted
- Bill Sharpe, founder member of Shakatak
- Clive Stafford Smith, human rights lawyer
- Laura Wright, singer from All Angels
- Tom West, Wasps and England Rugby Union player

== Head Masters ==
"Five heads in 130 years" is the subtitle of J. D. Sewell's 1992 history of the school.

1862–1890 Ellen and Margaret Ringer (However "there was only one master, Mr Annesley")

1891–1923 The Rev. W. Richmond Phillips

1923–1967 Thomas J. Elliott Sewell

1967–1991 J. Donald Sewell

1991–1997 Hugh Cocke

1997–2010 Martin Ives

2010–2014 John A. Brett

2015–2018 Thomas O'Sullivan

2018–2023 David W. Griffiths

2023– James P. I. Large

== Brettenham Park ==
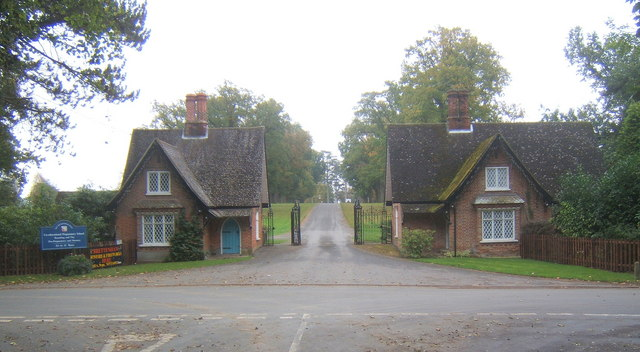
The North and South lodges at the end of the school drive

The school has occupied Brettenham Park since 1956. It was purchased from the Warner family, whose lineage includes Courtenay Warner, and from whom the school derives its coat of arms and motto.

The Grade II* listed house is of C16 origin and built upon the site of a much earlier residence. It was enlarged in the C19 as the residence of Joseph Bonaparte.
