= Brettenham, Suffolk =

Village in Suffolk, England

Coordinates: 52.145°N 0.872°E

Brettenham
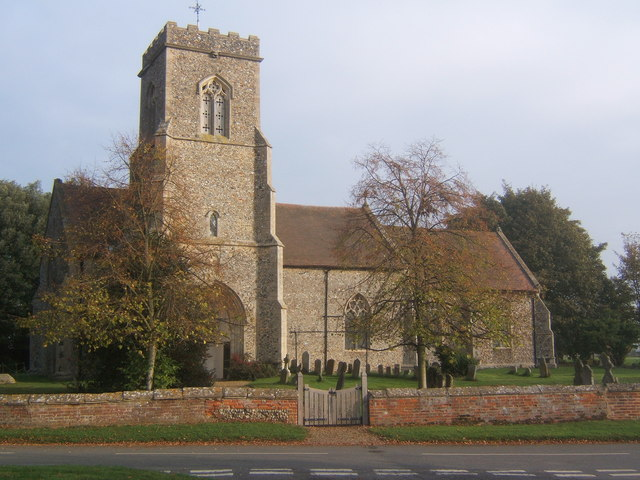
- St Mary's Church, Brettenham

- Location within Suffolk
- Area: 7.35 km^{2} (2.84 sq mi)
- Population: 353 (2011)
  - Density: 48/km^{2} (120/sq mi)
- District: Babergh
- Shire county: Suffolk
- Region: East
- Country: England
- Sovereign state: United Kingdom
- Post town: Ipswich
- Postcode district: IP7
- Dialling code: 01449

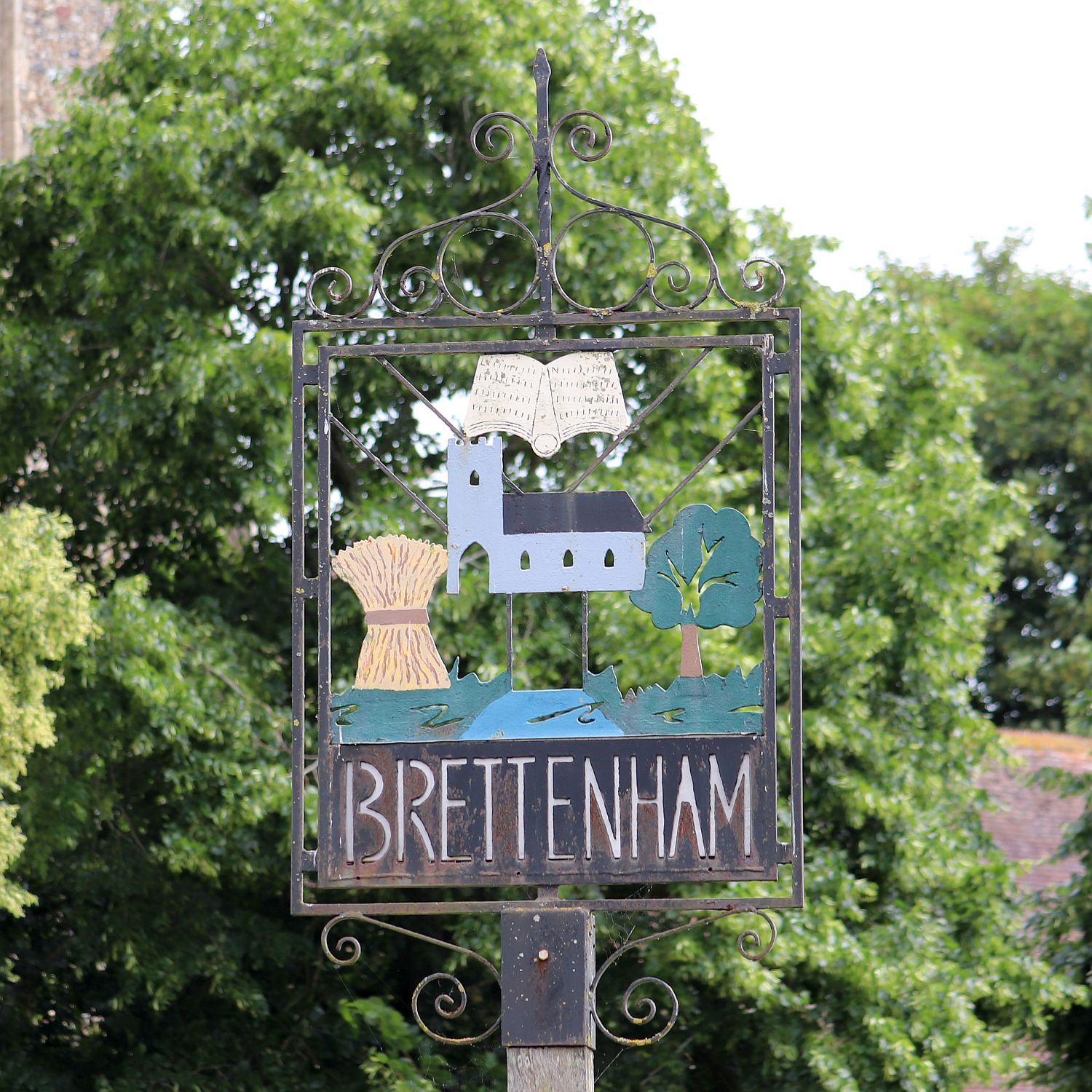
Brettenham Village Sign

Brettenham is a village and civil parish in the Babergh district of Suffolk, England. In 2005 it had a population of 270, increasing to 353 at the 2011 Census, and reduced to 321 in the 2021 census.

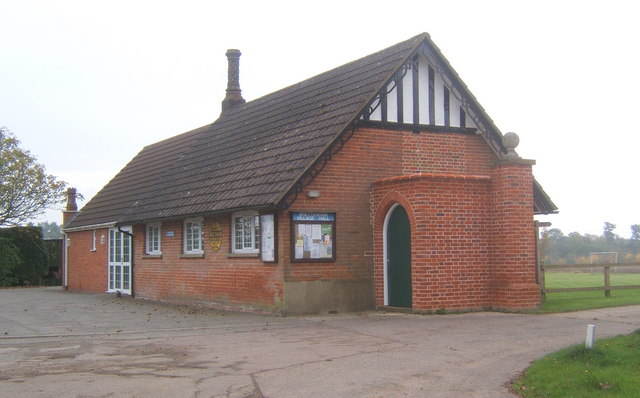
Brettenham village hall

Almost the entire built-up area is defined as a conservation area, and the parish also contains some ancient woodland at Ram's Wood. The village is home to independent prep school, Old Buckenham Hall.

== History ==
The ancient village is recorded about 1086 in Little Domesday as being within the hundred of Cosford.

The parish became part of Babergh district when it was formed on 1 April 1974 by the merger of Cosford Rural District (1882–1974) with other units of government.

== Governance ==
Brettenham is part of the electoral ward called Brett Vale. The population of this ward at the 2011 Census was 2,181.
