= Kersey Priory =

Medieval priory of canons regular in Kersey, Suffolk, England

Coordinates: 52.0625°N 0.9146°E

Kersey Priory was a priory in Kersey, Suffolk, England. It was founded before 1218 by Thomas de Burgh, Castellan of Norwich, and brother of Hubert de Burgh, Earl of Kent, as a hospital dedicated to St Mary the Blessed Virgin and St Anthony the Abbot until it was later converted into a monastery for a community of Austin Canons. The hospital itself became the house of the prior. The priory was dissolved in 1443 and the next year ownership of the property was granted to King's College, Cambridge.

Kersey Priory is a scheduled monument. The house on the site called "The Priory" became a Grade II listed building on 23 January 1958, part of the priory kitchen is said to be incorporated in the house.

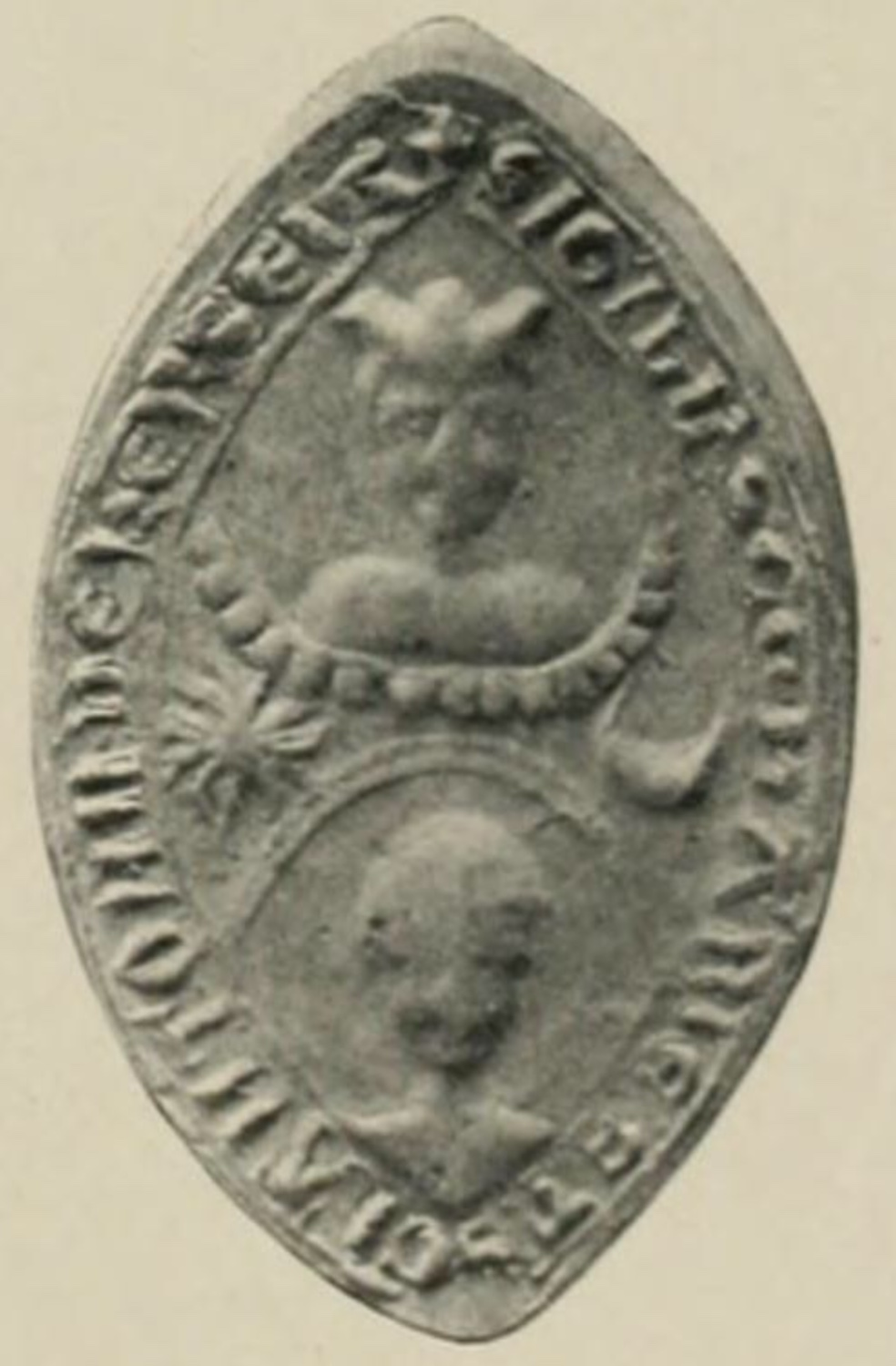
12th Century Seal of Kersey Priory

== Seal ==
The twelfth-century seal of Kersey Priory is a pointed oval bearing a bust of the Blessed Virgin crowned in clouds, below is the head of St. Anthony between them is a sun and crescent moon. It has the legend round the edge of ‘Sigill' sce Marie et sci Antonii de Kerseia’

== Priors of Kersey ==
- Richard Waleys, died 1331
- Robert de Akenham, elected 1331
- John Calle, resigned 1387
- John de Polstede, elected 1387
- John Buche, elected 1394
- John Dewche, elected 1411
- Nicholas Bungaye, resigned 1422
- Richard Fyn, elected 1422
- John Duch, elected 1431
- William Woodbridge, elected 1432

== Dissolution ==
When King's College took over the Manor property, the village church tower was completed and the building enlarged to compensate for the loss of the Priory church. Today the Priory chapel is a ruin situated on private property next to a medieval farmhouse. The walls of the chapel were 49 ft long and there were two 11 ft wide bays with arches. The arch from transept to choir was 10 feet wide and the transept 21 feet long.
