= Babergh Hundred =

Historical division of Suffolk, England

Coordinates: 52.06°N 0.79°E

Babergh Hundred

Babergh was a hundred of Suffolk, consisting of 71,882 acres (290.90 km^{2}). Its name survives in that of Babergh District, the local government district of southern Suffolk that includes the former hundred as well as those of Cosford and Samford.

It consisted of the land to the north, east and south-east of Sudbury, the hundred's largest town, and its southern boundary forms the border with Essex. The majority of the land is rural.

It was listed as Baberga in the Domesday Book of 1086, and the name is believed to mean "Mound of a man called Babba".

The name derives from Babergh Heath, an area of land around the villages of Great and Little Waldingfield. The village of Great Waldingfield is home to Babergh Hall, the ancient meeting place of the hundred.

== Parishes ==
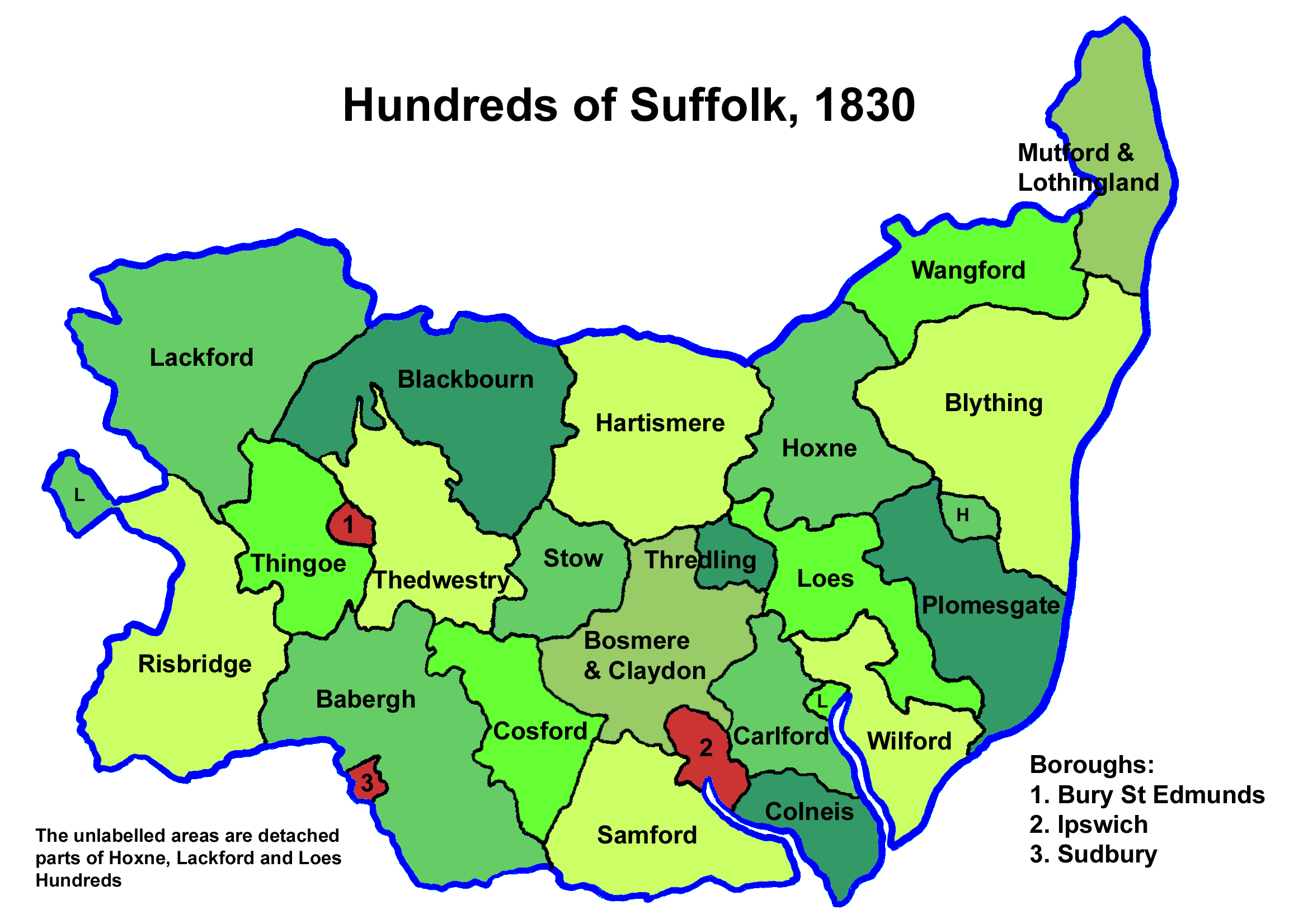
Suffolk hundreds

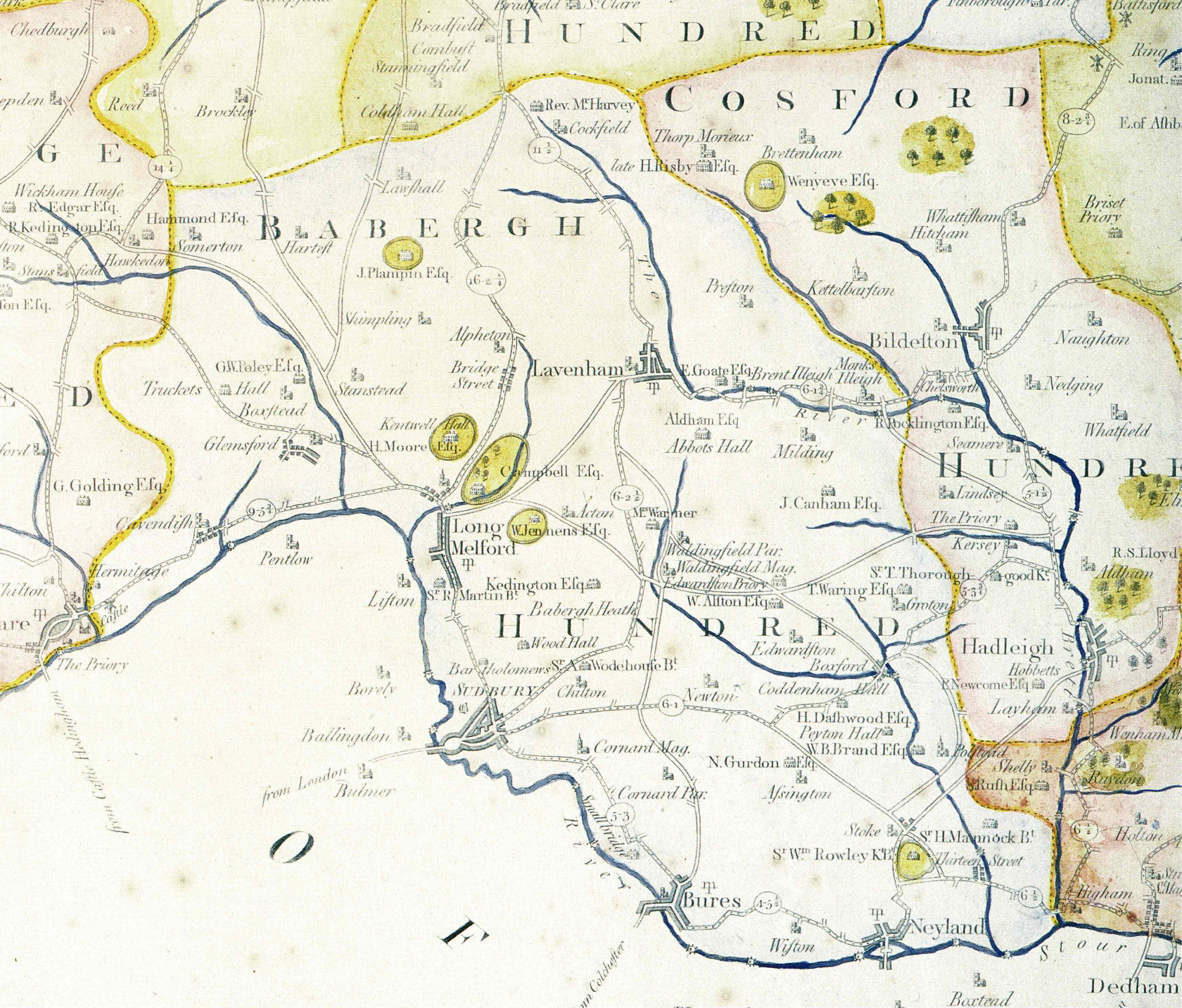
Babergh Hundred, (Kirby 1766)

Babergh Hundred consisted of the following 33 parishes:

Parish	Area (acres)
Acton	2729
Alpheton	1212
Assington	2974
Boxford	1802
Boxted	1367
Brent Eleigh	1625
Bures St Mary	2542
Cavendish	3393
Chilton	868
Cockfield	3626
Edwardstone	1872
Glemsford	2293
Great Cornard	1550
Great Waldingfield	2424
Groton	1572
Hartest	1964
Lavenham	2812
Lawshall	2907
Little Cornard	1600
Little Waldingfield	1700
Long Melford	5186
Milden	1332
Monks Eleigh	2099
Nayland	942
Newton	2198
Polstead	3402
Preston	1970
Shimpling	2699
Somerton	1040
Stanstead	1162
Stoke-by-Nayland	4600
Sudbury	1250
Wiston	1170
