= River Box =

River in Suffolk, England

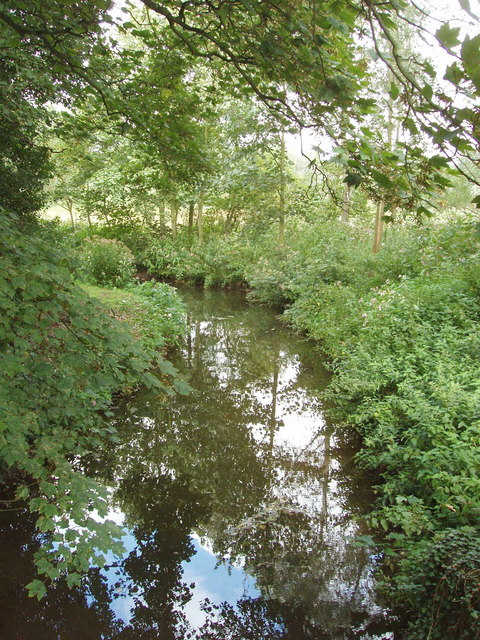
- River Box near Scotland Street

Location
- Country: England
- Counties: Suffolk
- Villages: Boxford

Physical characteristics
- Source
  - location: Humble Green, Suffolk
  - coordinates: 52.0836°N 0.8114°E
- Mouth
  - location: Higham, Suffolk
  - coordinates: 51.975°N 0.953°E
- Length: 23 km (14 mi)
- Basin size: 67 km^{2} (26 sq mi)
- Discharge
  - location: Polstead
  - average: 0.22 m^{3}/s (7.8 cu ft/s)
  - maximum: 10 m^{3}/s (350 cu ft/s)
- Progression : River Box—Stour—North Sea

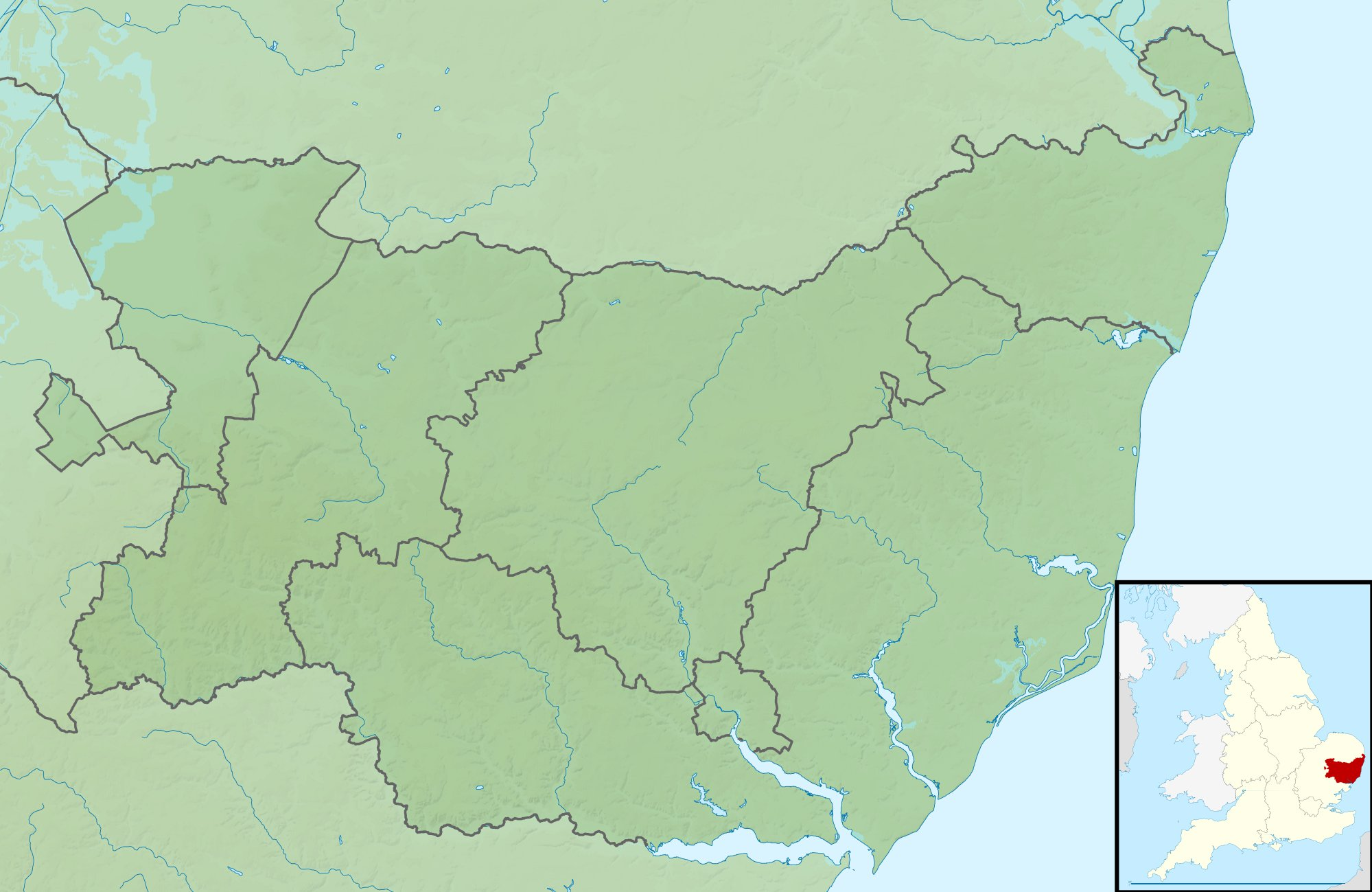
Map of Suffolk - showing the source and mouth of the Box

The River Box is a small river, 14 miles (23 km) in length, that flows through Suffolk, England. It is a tributary of the River Stour.

== Toponymy ==
The present name is a back-formation from Boxford. A previous name Amalburna is found in an Old English text dated after 991, published in the Cartularium Saxonicum (p. 1289). Eilert Ekwall discusses various possible roots, including the British (i.e. pre-English) root ambro meaning "water".

== Course ==
The river rises to the north of Little Waldingfield, near to where two other small streams also rise, which converge with the Box at Upsher Green.

From this point the river flows south-east, past Edwardstone towards the large village of Boxford, where it is crossed by the A1071. The river then continues in the same direction and passes a number of villages and hamlets, which are suffixed by the name street. These include Stone Street and to the south of Polstead, Mill Street. The river then passes Scotland Street before reaching the village of Thorington Street, and Thorington Hall. It continues flowing southeast to meet the Stour, between Langham and Higham, which is also close to the confluence of the River Brett and Stour.

== Hydrology ==
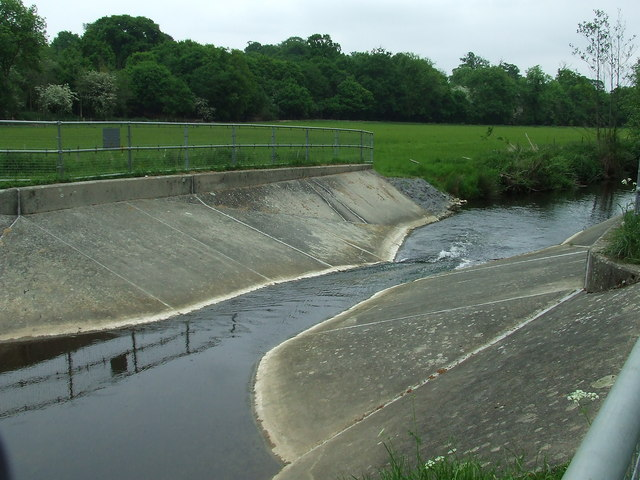
Polstead measurement flume

Since 1960 the flow of the River Box, has been measured in its middle reaches at a flume near Polstead. The fifty four year record shows that the catchment of 54 square kilometres (21 sq mi) to the gauging station yields an average flow of 0.22 cubic metres per second (7.8 cu ft/s). The highest river level recorded was in January 1998 with a height of 1.25 metres (4 ft 1 in) through the flume, which was estimated to have a flow of 10 cubic metres per second (350 cu ft/s).

The catchment upstream of the gauging station has an average annual rainfall of 566 millimetres (22.3 in) and a maximum altitude of 83.6 metres (274 ft). Land use is mostly rural, consisting of arable farming.

The River Box has been classed as having moderate ecological quality under the Water Framework Directive. This is the middle band in the five part framework scale, which ranges from high, good, and moderate, through to poor and finally bad.
