= Nedging =

Village in Suffolk, England

Coordinates: 52.105°N 0.935°E

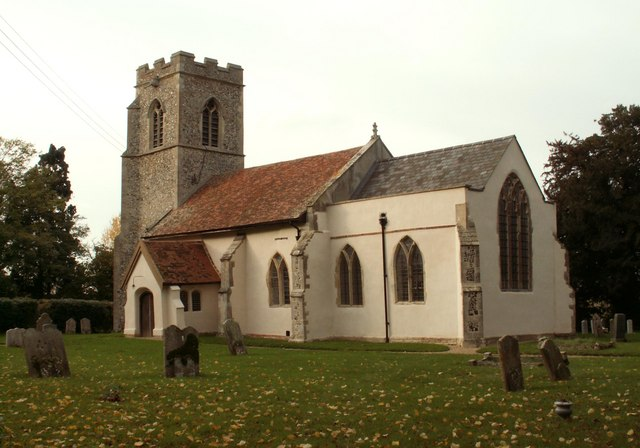
- St Mary's parish church

- Location within Suffolk
- Civil parish: Nedging-with-Naughton
- District: Babergh
- Shire county: Suffolk
- Region: East
- Country: England
- Sovereign state: United Kingdom
- Post town: Ipswich
- Postcode district: IP7
- Police: Suffolk
- Fire: Suffolk
- Ambulance: East of England

Nedging is a village and former civil parish on the B1115 road, now in the parish of Nedging-with-Naughton, in the Babergh district, in the county of Suffolk, England. The nearest town is Hadleigh, there is also the hamlet of Nedging Tye nearby. In 1931 the civil parish had a population of 155. On 1 April 1935 it was merged with Naughton to create Nedging-with-Naughton.

The parish church of St Mary is a Grade I listed medieval church.

== Nedging-with-Naughton parish make-up ==
- Naughton
- Nedging
- Nedging Tye

== Other sources ==
- Philip's Street Atlas: Suffolk (2007). Philip's, p. 79.
