= Cosford (surname) =

Cosford is a surname. Notable people with the surname include:

- Becky Cosford (born 1986), Canadian pair skater
- Paul Cosford (1963–2021), British medical administrator
