= Robert Longden (cricketer) =

English clergyman and cricketer

Robert Knight Longden (27 May 1817 – 19 June 1895) was an English clergyman and a cricketer who played first-class cricket fleetingly for Cambridge University in 1837. He was born at Marylebone in London and died at Lavenham, Suffolk.

Educated at Winchester College and Trinity Hall, Cambridge, Longden took a Bachelor of Laws degree at Cambridge, graduating in 1841. His cricket at Cambridge was limited to two games for the university against the Marylebone Cricket Club (MCC) in which he batted in the lower middle order and does not appear to have bowled: in both cases, the full scorecard has not survived, and it is not known if he was right- or left-handed. There was no University Match against Oxford in the 1837 season.

After leaving Cambridge, Longden was ordained as a Church of England priest; he was curate at Groton, Suffolk from 1851 and rector of Brent Eleigh, also in Suffolk, from 1860 until his death in 1895. The account of his funeral in the Bury and Norwich Post newspaper indicates that he was married and had three sons.
