= Nedging Tye =

Hamlet in Suffolk, England

Coordinates: 52.108°N 0.949°E

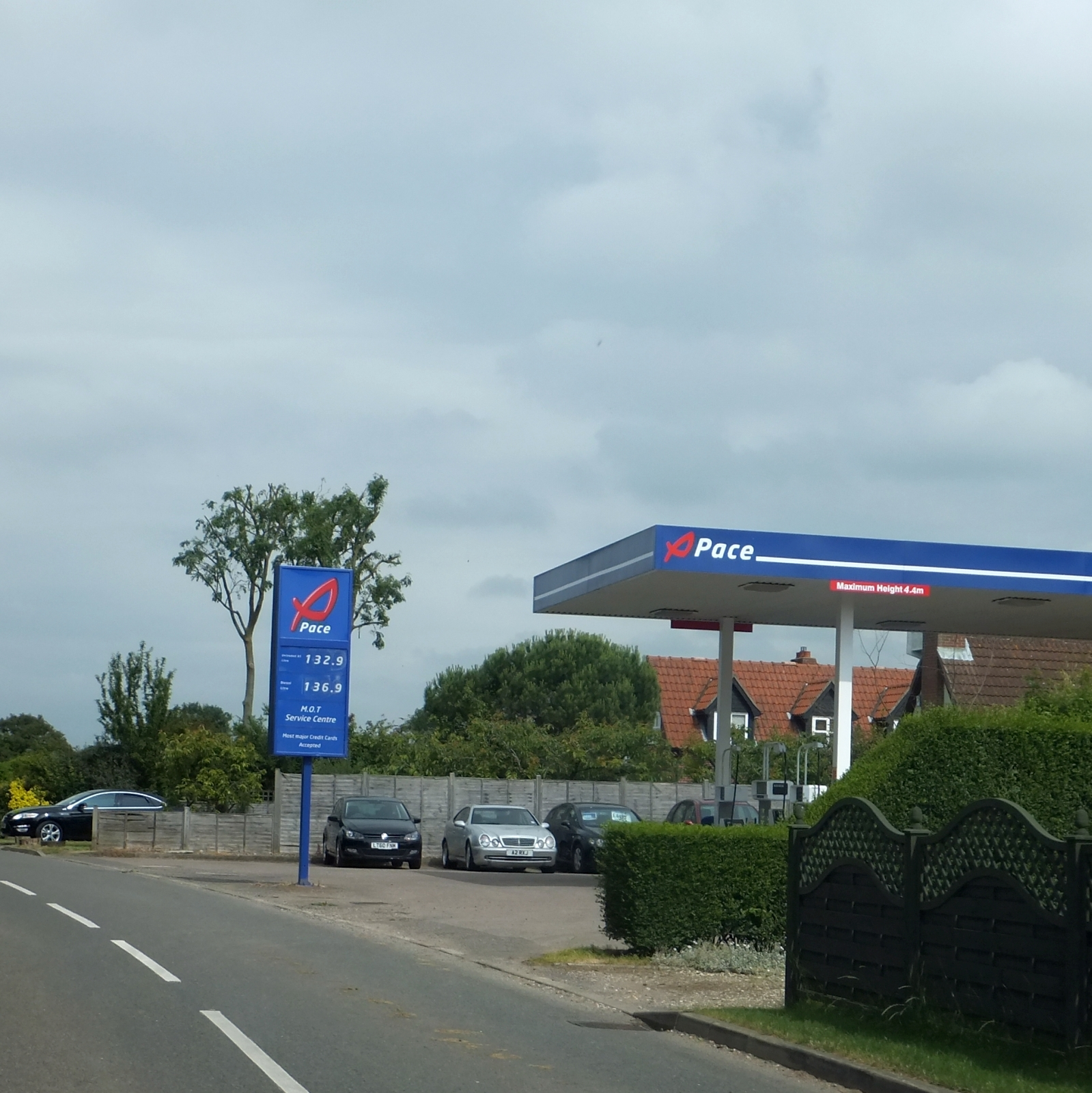

- Location within Suffolk
- Civil parish: Nedging-with-Naughton
- District: Babergh
- Shire county: Suffolk
- Region: East
- Country: England
- Sovereign state: United Kingdom
- Police: Suffolk
- Fire: Suffolk
- Ambulance: East of England

Nedging Tye is a hamlet on the B1078 road, in the civil parish of Nedging-with-Naughton, in the Babergh district, in the county of Suffolk, England. The nearest town is Hadleigh. There is also the village of Naughton nearby.

== Nedging-with-Naughton parish make-up ==
- Naughton
- Nedging
- Nedging Tye
