= Boxford, Suffolk =

Village in Suffolk, England

Coordinates: 52.033°N 0.867°E

Boxford
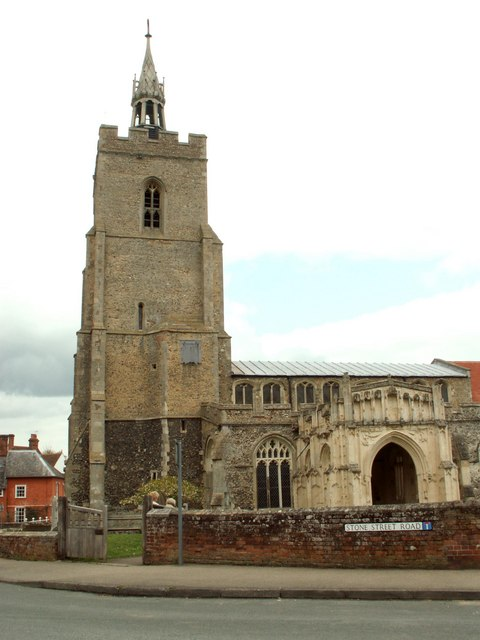
- St. Mary's Church, Boxford

- Location within Suffolk
- Interactive map of Boxford
- Area: 0.5143 km^{2} (0.1986 sq mi)
- Population: 1,403 (2021)
  - Density: 2,728/km^{2} (7,070/sq mi)
- District: Babergh
- Shire county: Suffolk
- Region: East
- Country: England
- Sovereign state: United Kingdom
- Post town: Sudbury
- Postcode district: CO10
- Dialling code: 01787
- Police: Suffolk
- Fire: Suffolk
- Ambulance: East of England
- UK Parliament: South Suffolk
- Website: www.boxfordsuffolk.com

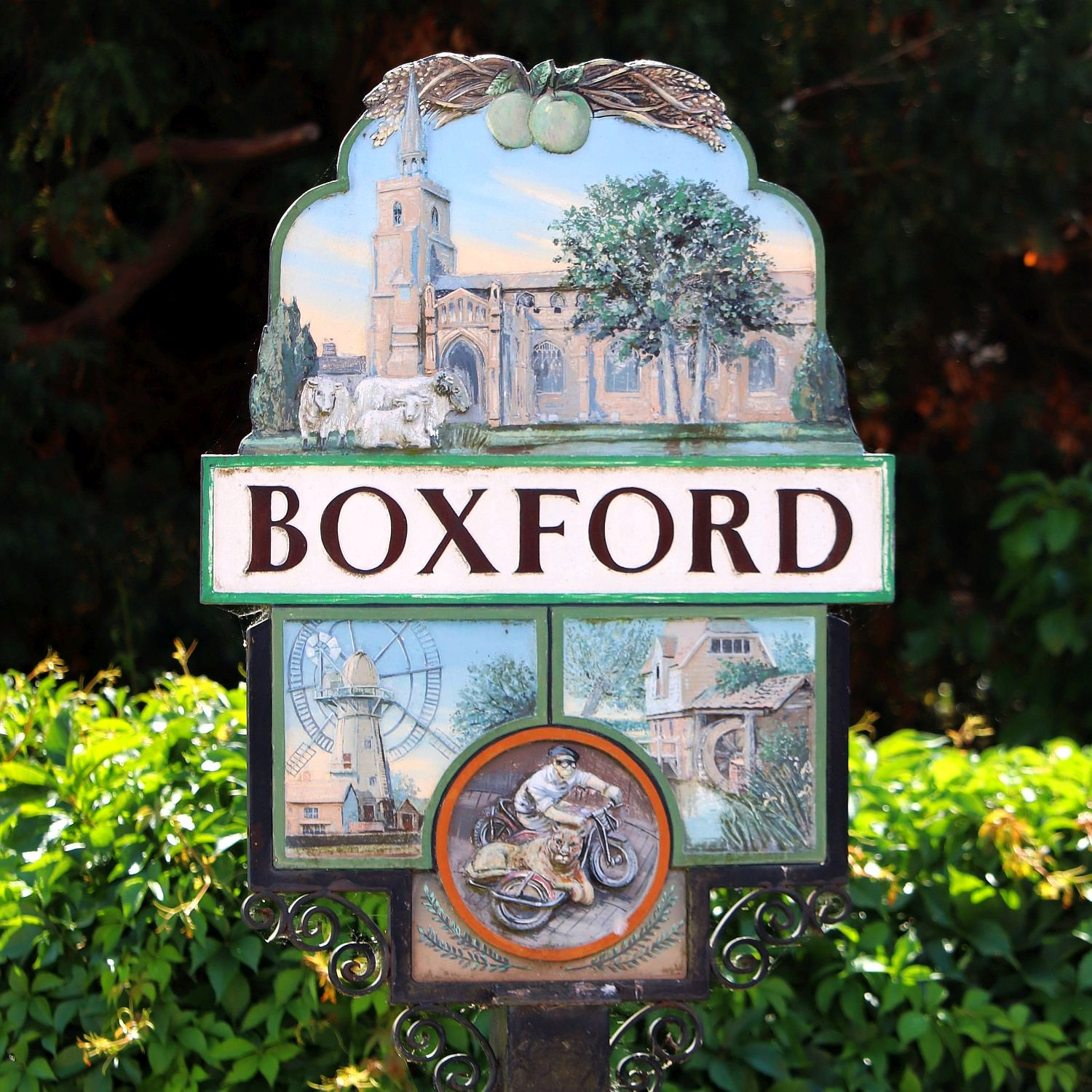
Boxford Village Sign

Boxford is a village and civil parish in the Babergh district of Suffolk, England. Located around six miles east of Sudbury straddling the River Box and skirted by the Holbrook. The parish includes the hamlets of Calais Street, Hagmore Green and Stone Street. In 2021 the built-up area had a population of 833. In 2021 the parish had a population of 1403. The parish borders Assington, Edwardstone, Groton, Kersey, Newton and Polstead. There are 87 listed buildings in Boxford. Boxford became a conservation area in 1973.

== History ==
According to Eilert Ekwall the meaning of the village name is "the ford where box trees grow". During the Middle Ages, Boxford was a wool town.

=== Historical writings ===
In 1870–72, John Marius Wilson's Imperial Gazetteer of England and Wales described the village as:

BOXFORD, a village and a parish in Gosford district, Suffolk. The village stands on an affluent of the river Stour, 4½ miles WSW of Hadleigh r. station, and 6 ESE of Sudbury; and has a post office† under Colchester, and fairs on Easter Monday and 21 Dec.—The parish includes also the hamlet of Hadleigh. Acres, 1,820. Real property, £4,174. Pop., 986. Houses, 236. The property is subdivided. The living is a rectory in the diocese of Ely. Value, £710.* Patron, the Crown. The church is good; and there are an Independent chapel, an endowed grammar school, and charities £58.

In 1887, John Bartholomew also wrote an entry on Boxford in the Gazetteer of the British Isles with a much shorter description:

Boxford, par. and vil., W. Suffolk, 6 miles SE. of Sudbury, 1820 ac., pop. 864; P.O., T.O.

== Governance ==
A electoral ward with the same name existed until 2019. The population of this ward stretched north to Milden with a total population of 2,170.

Boxford was in the Babergh hundred, in 1894 it became part of Cosford Rural District which became part of the administrative county of West Suffolk in 1889. In 1974 it became part of Babergh non-metropolitan district in the non-metropolitan county of Suffolk.

== International connections ==
As part of the American Bicentennial celebrations the townspeople of Boxford, Massachusetts, visited the villages of Boxford (there are three) in England during 1975 looking for the source of the name of their own village and decided that Boxford in Suffolk was likely to be where the name of their own town came from.

As a result of this the villagers of Boxford, Suffolk, were invited to Boxford, MA, the following summer. This drew attention from the media: the Evening Standard incorporated a photograph of the villagers in a centre-page spread in one of their November 1975 editions, and a TV crew led by Bernard Falk for the BBC Nationwide programme accompanied the villagers when they left for a two-week stay on 23 July 1976. A TWA Boeing 707 was hired which flew the villagers from London Heathrow to Boston Logan, from where they were bussed to Boxford, MA, and dispersed amongst receiving families.

== Economy ==
There are two pubs in Boxford: The Fleece, (a 16th-century grade II* listed coaching inn) and the White Hart. Boxford has a church called St Mary's which is Grade I listed and a primary school.

Riddelsdell Brothers was established here in 1900 and is believed to be Europe's oldest recorded working garage.

Copella fruit juices are made at orchards at Hill Farm on the outskirts of Boxford.

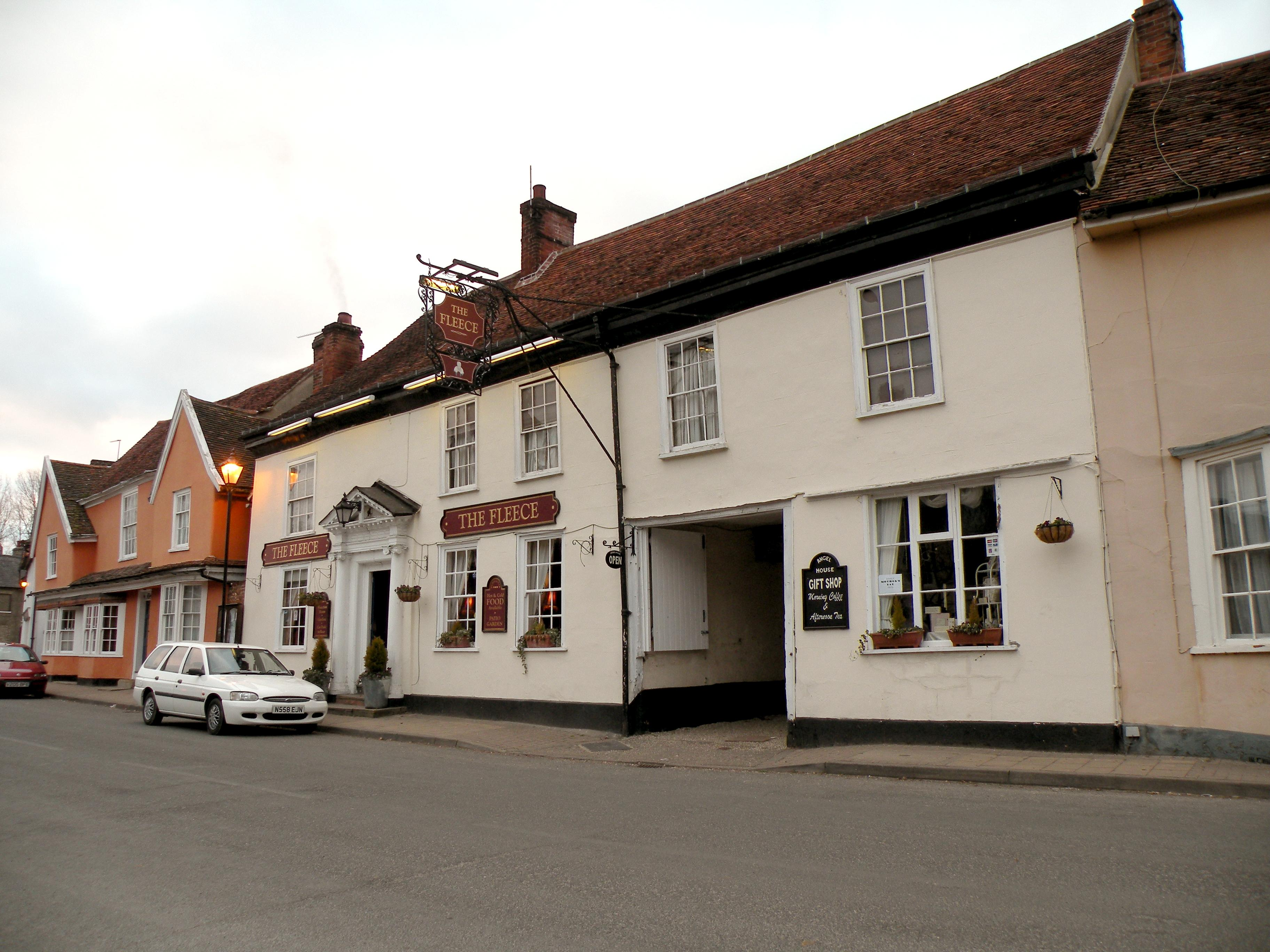
The Fleece Hotel in Broad Street

== Geography ==
=== Localities ===
Intrinsic to the parish of Boxford are 3 hamlets, Stone Street south of the church and the A1071 and that to the east as Calais Street, neither separated by buffer zones of more than 250 metres and well connected by pavements/footpaths as well as roads. Hagmore Green is south west of Stone Street.

== Notable people ==
- Robert Coe (1596–1689), early settler of New England.
- John Kingsbury (?–1660), a representative of Dedham, Massachusetts to the Great and General Court in 1647, originally from Boxford.
- Joseph Kingsbury (1600–1676), early settler and selectman in Dedham, Massachusetts.
- Elinor Bellingham-Smith (1906–1988), painter of landscapes and still life.
- Hardiman Scott (1920–1999), journalist, broadcaster and writer. He served as the BBC's first political editor, from 1970 to 1975.
