= Little Waldingfield =

Village in Suffolk, England

Coordinates: 52.071°N 0.804°E

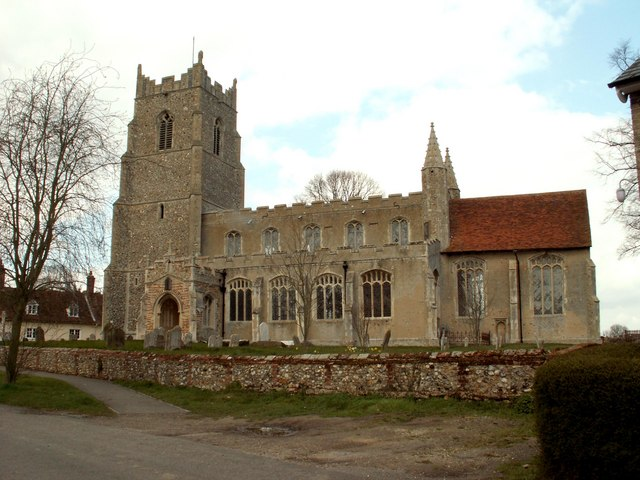
- St. Lawrence's church, Little Waldingfield

- Location within Suffolk
- Population: 364 (2021)
- District: Babergh
- Shire county: Suffolk
- Region: East
- Country: England
- Sovereign state: United Kingdom
- Post town: Sudbury
- Postcode district: CO10
- Dialling code: 01787

Little Waldingfield is a village and civil parish in Suffolk, England. Located two miles from its sister village, Great Waldingfield, it is part of the Babergh district, and includes the hamlet of Humble Green. In 2021 its population was 364.

Around half the village is a designated conservation area, and the parish also contains part of the Milden Thicks SSSI and two of the sources of the River Box.

Robert Branford, thought to be the first black Metropolitan Police officer, died in 1869 and is buried in the parish churchyard.
