= Nedging-with-Naughton =

Civil parish in Suffolk, England

Coordinates: 52.1040°N 0.9458°E

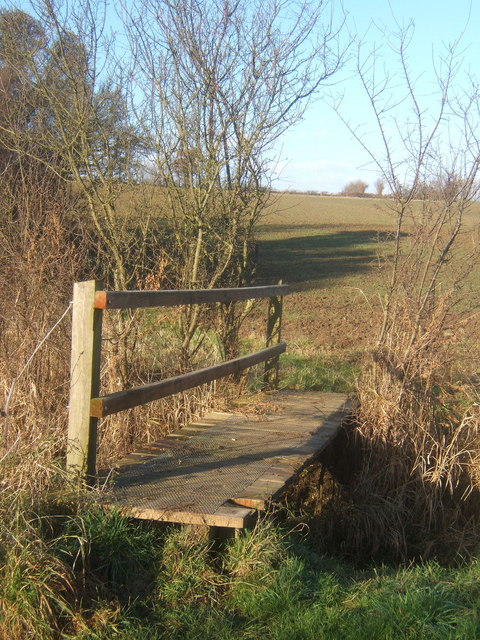

- Location within Suffolk
- Population: 404 (2011 census)
- Civil parish: Nedging-with-Naughton
- District: Babergh
- Shire county: Suffolk
- Region: East
- Country: England
- Sovereign state: United Kingdom

Nedging-with-Naughton is a civil parish in the Babergh District of the county of Suffolk, England. Located on the B1078 between Bildeston and Needham Market, it consists of three settlements;

- Naughton
- Nedging
- Nedging Tye

The parish contains two areas classified as Ancient Woodland; Glebe Town Grove and Tyrell's Grove. Both sites are also nature reserves. In 2001 the population of the parish was 388, increasing to 404 at the 2011 Census. The parish was formed on 1 April 1935 from the parishes of "Nedging" and "Naughton" and part of Bildeston.
