= Kersey, Suffolk =

Village in Suffolk, England

Coordinates: 52.05°N 0.917°E

Kersey
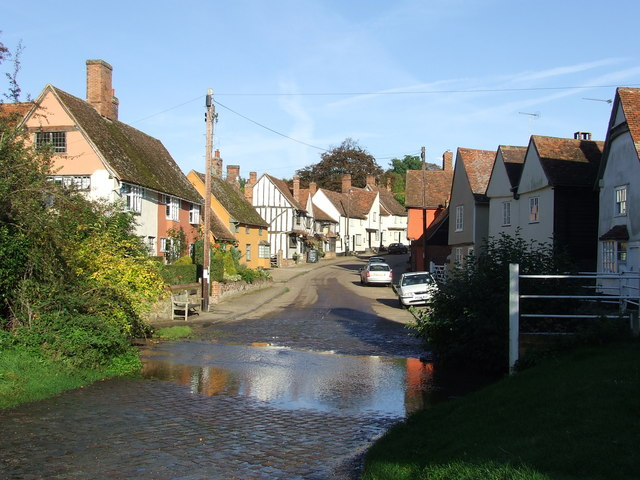
- Kersey ford

- Location within Suffolk
- Population: 359 (2011)
- Civil parish: Kersey
- District: Babergh
- Shire county: Suffolk
- Region: East
- Country: England
- Sovereign state: United Kingdom
- Post town: IPSWICH
- Postcode district: IP7
- UK Parliament: South Suffolk

Kersey is a village and civil parish in the Babergh district in Suffolk, in the east of England. The main street has a ford across a stream. Its principal claim to fame is that a coarse woollen cloth called Kersey cloth takes its name from it. A particular green colour is known as Kersey Green. The cloth was presumably originally made there, but later in many other places too.

== Geography and demographics ==
The parish contains the village of Kersey and the hamlets of Kersey Tye, Kersey Upland, Wicker Street Green and William's Green. Kersey's church is St Mary's, and the village also contains a primary school.

The population of the parish at the 2011 Census was 359.

== Village ==
The village is known for its picturesque main street with medieval timber-framed houses and a ford of a tributary of the River Brett known locally as "The Splash".

Kersey was the location of an alleged paranormal incident known as 'The Kersey Time Slip' where three Royal Navy cadets; William Laing, Michael Crowley and Ray Baker, are said to have travelled back in time when entering the village in 1957 on a training exercise.

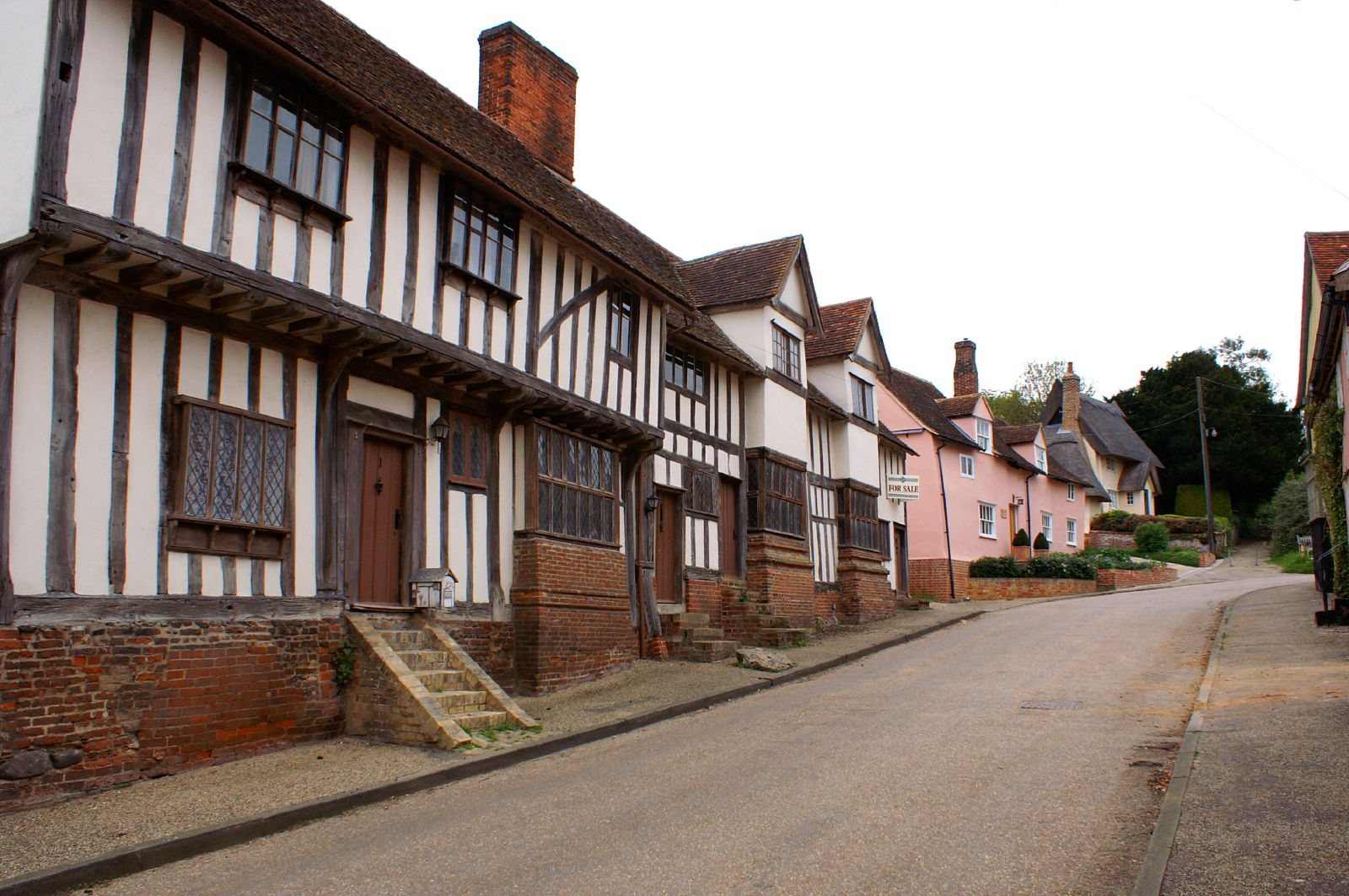
Traditional cottages in Kersey

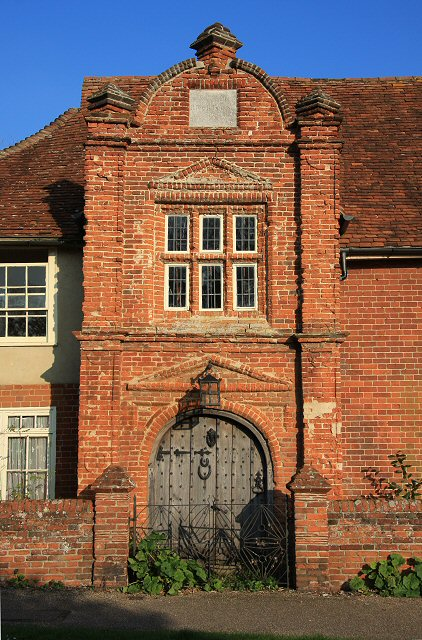
River House, gateway built 1490

== Filming ==
The village has been used as a filming location, including for Lovejoy, Magpie Murders and the advert launching the Austin Metro. Kersey is also the subject of Penelope Keith's TV series "Hidden Villages", season 1/ episode 1 (2014).

== Notable residents ==
- Robert Gordon-Finlayson (1881–1956), Adjutant-General to the Forces; he was created a Knight Commander of the Order of the Bath in 1937, Companion of the Order of St Michael and St George in 1918, and Companion of the Distinguished Service Order in 1915.
- Lewis Lyne, (1899–1970), a Major-General who served before and during World War II and was created a Companion of the Order of the Bath in 1945 and Companion of the Distinguished Service Order in 1943.
- Hammond Innes (1913–1998), novelist.
- Peter Vansittart (1920–2008), novelist.

== See also ==
- Kersey Priory
- Listed buildings in Kersey, Suffolk
