= Grade I listed buildings in Babergh =

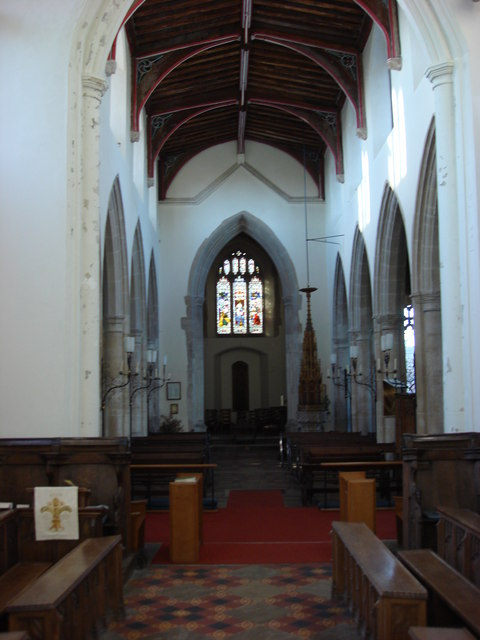
The interior of St Gregory's, the main parish church of Sudbury.

There are many Grade I listed buildings in Babergh, a non-metropolitan district of in the county of Suffolk in England.

In the United Kingdom, the term listed building refers to a building or other structure officially designated as being of "exceptional architectural or historic special interest"; Grade I structures are those considered to be "buildings of "exceptional interest, sometimes considered to be internationally important. Just 2.5% of listed buildings are Grade I." The total number of listed buildings in England is 372,905. Listing was begun by a provision in the Town and Country Planning Act 1947. Listing a building imposes severe restrictions on what the owner might wish to change or modify in the structure or its fittings. In England, the authority for listing under the Planning (Listed Buildings and Conservation Areas) Act 1990 rests with English Heritage, a non-departmental public body sponsored by the Department for Culture, Media and Sport.

Babergh is a local government district with its administrative headquarters at Ipswich (outside the district, previously being Hadleigh), while the main town in the district is Sudbury. The number of inhabitants of the area is 86,700 with a density of 146 inhabitants per km^{2}. The whole district is parished and divided among 76 civil parishes, of which only 21 in 2006 had a population over 1,000 inhabitants and 18 were provided with key facilities.

The district is well known due to its natural environment as "Constable Country" after the landscapes painted by John Constable in the Area of Outstanding Natural Beauty of Dedham Vale; it is famed also for the medieval wool villages of Lavenham and Kersey. Summing up Babergh has in its territory 4,000 listed buildings, 34 scheduled monuments, 5 registered Parks and Gardens of Special Historic Interest, 28 conservation areas, 53 Sites of Special Scientific Interest and 231 County Wildlife Sites.

== List ==
Name	Location	Type	Completed (Note: The date given is the date used by Historic England as significant for the initial building or that of an important part in the structure's description.)	Date designated	Grid ref. (Note: The grid reference is based on the British national grid reference system, sometimes known as OSGB36, used by the Ordnance Survey.) Geo-coordinates	Notes	Entry number (Note: The "List Entry Number" is a unique number assigned to each listed building and scheduled monument by Historic England.)	Image
Church of All Saints	Acton	Church	13th century	23 March 1961	TL8922345230; 52°04′23″N 0°45′35″E		1036718	Church of All Saints More images
Church of St Mary	Aldham	Church	c.1340	23 January 1958	TM0407244439; 52°03′39″N 0°58′32″E		1037438	Church of St Mary More images
Church of St Peter and St Paul	Alpheton	Church	15th century	23 March 1961	TL8734650474; 52°07′15″N 0°44′06″E		1036728	Church of St Peter and St Paul More images
Church of St Mary	Erwarton	Church	15th century	22 February 1955	TM2208334670; 51°57′58″N 1°13′53″E		1286145	Church of St Mary More images
Erwarton Hall Gatehouse	Arwarton	Gatehouse	c.1549	23 February 1989	TM2232535206; 51°58′15″N 1°14′07″E		1193599	Erwarton Hall Gatehouse More images
Church of St Edmund	Assington	Church	15th century	23 March 1961	TL9357438796; 52°00′50″N 0°49′10″E		1036733	Church of St Edmund More images
Barn on opposite side of road and approximately 100 metres north east of Bentley Hall	Bentley	Barn	Early 16th century	22 February 1955	TM1193738462; 52°00′15″N 1°05′11″E		1351965	Barn on opposite side of road and approximately 100 metres north east of Bentley Hall More images
Church of St Mary Magdalene	Bildeston	Church	16th century	23 January 1958	TL9856749208; 52°06′20″N 0°53′53″E		1037449	Church of St Mary Magdalene More images
Church of St Mary	Boxford	Church	15th century	23 January 1958	TL9626140491; 52°01′41″N 0°51′34″E		1037396	Church of St Mary More images
Church of All Saints	Boxted	Church	15th century	23 March 1961	TL8248450465; 52°07′21″N 0°39′51″E		1351739	Church of All Saints More images
Brent Eleigh Hall	Brent Eleigh	House	18th century	23 January 1958	TL9412248225; 52°05′54″N 0°49′58″E		1285950	Brent Eleigh Hall More images
Church of St Mary the Virgin	Brent Eleigh	Church	14th century	23 January 1958	TL9420848244; 52°05′54″N 0°50′02″E		1351432	Church of St Mary the Virgin More images
Church of St Mary the Virgin	Brettenham	Church	14th century	23 January 1958	TL9672654200; 52°09′04″N 0°52′27″E		1037350	Church of St Mary the Virgin More images
Chapel of St Stephen	Bures St Mary	Church	13th century	10 January 1953	TL9177034441; 51°58′31″N 0°47′26″E		1351742	Chapel of St Stephen More images
Church of St Mary the Virgin	Bures St Mary	Church	14th century	23 March 1961	TL9068634021; 51°58′19″N 0°46′29″E		1036711	Church of St Mary the Virgin More images
Church of St Mary	Burstall	Church	14th century	22 February 1955	TM0971644579; 52°03′36″N 1°03′28″E		1036948	Church of St Mary More images
Church of All Saints	Chelsworth	Church	14th century	23 January 1958	TL9804147920; 52°05′39″N 0°53′23″E		1037358	Church of All Saints More images
Church of St Mary	Chilton	Church	15th century	23 March 1961	TL8896942215; 52°02′46″N 0°45′15″E		1351732	Church of St Mary More images
Church of St Peter	Cockfield	Church	15th century	23 January 1958	TL9039654991; 52°09′37″N 0°46′56″E		1037333	Church of St Peter More images
Church of St Mary	East Bergholt	Church	16th century	22 February 1955	TM0703334456; 51°58′12″N 1°00′45″E		1193803	Church of St Mary More images
Flatford Mill	Flatford	Mill	1733	22 February 1955	TM0770833249; 51°57′32″N 1°01′18″E		1351931	Flatford Mill More images
Millers House and Cottage	Flatford	House	17th century	22 February 1955	TM0769833220; 51°57′31″N 1°01′17″E		1033437	Millers House and Cottage More images
Valley Farmhouse	Flatford	House	15th century	22 February 1955	TM0775233269; 51°57′33″N 1°01′20″E		1033473	Valley Farmhouse More images
Willy Lott's Cottage	Flatford	House	17th century	22 February 1955	TM0773433187; 51°57′30″N 1°01′19″E		1033438	Willy Lott's Cottage More images
Church of St Mary the Virgin	Edwardstone	Church	15th century	23 January 1958	TL9402442071; 52°02′35″N 0°49′40″E		1194451	Church of St Mary the Virgin More images
Church of St Peter	Elmsett	Church	15th century	23 January 1958	TM0588347205; 52°05′06″N 1°00′13″E		1194594	Church of St Peter More images
Church of St Mary	Glemsford	Church	15th century	9 February 1978	TL8341648388; 52°06′12″N 0°40′36″E		1036650	Church of St Mary More images
Abbas Hall	Great Cornard	Timber framed house	13th century	16 April 1971	TL9009740408; 52°01′46″N 0°46′11″E		1180619	Abbas Hall More images
Church of St Andrew	Great Cornard	Church	15th century	23 March 1961	TL8833040401; 52°01′48″N 0°44′38″E		1180669	Church of St Andrew More images
Church of St Lawrence	Great Waldingfield	Church	14th century	9 February 1978	TL9120343914; 52°03′38″N 0°47′16″E		1351751	Church of St Lawrence More images
Church of St Bartholomew	Groton	Church	15th century	23 January 1958	TL9596941680; 52°02′20″N 0°51′21″E		1037284	Church of St Bartholomew More images
Church of St Mary	Hadleigh	Church	15th century	26 April 1950	TM0258442469; 52°02′37″N 0°57′09″E		1036820	Church of St Mary More images
Deanery Tower	Hadleigh	Deanery	1495	26 April 1950	TM0254542442; 52°02′36″N 0°57′07″E		1194031	Deanery Tower More images
Hadleigh Guildhall	Hadleigh	Guildhall	15th century	26 April 1950	TM0259342421; 52°02′35″N 0°57′10″E		1194046	Hadleigh Guildhall More images
Coffee Tavern	Hadleigh	Shop	17th century	26 April 1950	TM0266242524; 52°02′39″N 0°57′14″E		1351730	Coffee Tavern More images
Church of All Saints	Hartest	Church	15th century	23 March 1961	TL8346952388; 52°08′22″N 0°40′46″E		1351776	Church of All Saints More images
Hintlesham Hall	Hintlesham	House	1740	22 February 1955	TM0831743823; 52°03′13″N 1°02′13″E		1036917	Hintlesham Hall More images
Church of All Saints	Hitcham	Church	15th century	23 January 1958	TL9845051105; 52°07′21″N 0°53′51″E		1285593	Church of All Saints More images
Ancient Cottages: House adjoining	Kersey	House	16th century	23 January 1958	TL9997844258; 52°03′38″N 0°54′57″E		1180431	Ancient Cottages: House adjoining More images
Ancient Cottages	Kersey	House	16th century	23 January 1958	TL9998044252; 52°03′38″N 0°54′57″E		1037250	Ancient Cottages More images
Church of St Mary	Kersey	Church	15th century	23 January 1958	TM0020743946; 52°03′28″N 0°55′08″E		1351459	Church of St Mary More images
Church of St Mary	Kettlebaston	Church	14th century	23 January 1958	TL9657850287; 52°06′57″N 0°52′11″E		1037253	Church of St Mary More images
Church of Saint Peter and Saint Paul	Lavenham	Church	16th century	23 January 1958	TL9128349021; 52°06′23″N 0°47′30″E		1037230	Church of Saint Peter and Saint Paul More images
Molet House	Lavenham	Clothiers house	Early 16th century	23 January 1958	TL9165649273; 52°06′31″N 0°47′50″E		1037218	Molet House More images
De Vere House	Lavenham	House	15th century	23 January 1958	TL9166849119; 52°06′26″N 0°47′51″E		1037131	De Vere House More images
Shilling Old Grange	Lavenham	House	15th century	23 January 1958	TL9180049192; 52°06′28″N 0°47′58″E		1285097	Shilling Old Grange More images
Old Wool Hall	Lavenham	House	15th century	23 January 1958	TL9159549177; 52°06′28″N 0°47′47″E		1285221	Old Wool Hall More images
Lavenham Guildhall	Lavenham	Guildhall	c.1529	23 January 1958	TL9160249285; 52°06′31″N 0°47′48″E		1037186	Lavenham Guildhall More images
The Old Grammar School	Lavenham	School	16th century	23 January 1958	TL9172449175; 52°06′28″N 0°47′54″E		1351513	The Old Grammar School More images
Lavenham Priory	Lavenham	Priory	15th century	23 January 1958	TL9160949130; 52°06′26″N 0°47′48″E		1285004	Lavenham Priory More images
Tudor Shops	Lavenham	Shop	16th century	23 January 1958	TL9161449163; 52°06′27″N 0°47′48″E		1351532	Tudor Shops More images
Rose and Crown	Lavenham	Jettied house	15th century	23 January 1958	TL9161849300; 52°06′32″N 0°47′48″E		1181069	Rose and Crown More images
Water Street: Nos 7-9	Lavenham	Cross-wing house	15th century	23 January 1958	TL9163549148; 52°06′27″N 0°47′49″E		1285044	Water Street: Nos 7-9 More images
Market Place: Nos 27 & 28	Lavenham	Jettied house	16th century	23 January 1958	TL9160949293; 52°06′32″N 0°47′48″E		1351534	Market Place: Nos 27 & 28 More images
Water Street: Nos 67 & 68	Lavenham	Cross-wing house	16th century	23 January 1958	TL9161249129; 52°06′26″N 0°47′48″E		1037134	Water Street: Nos 67 & 68 More images
Church of All Saints	Lawshall	Church	15th century	23 March 1961	TL8643654260; 52°09′18″N 0°43′26″E		1036594	Church of All Saints More images
Chapel of St James	Lindsey	Chapel	c.1250	23 January 1958	TL9778944378; 52°03′45″N 0°53′02″E		1351517	Chapel of St James More images
Church of St Peter	Lindsey	Church	14th century	23 January 1958	TL9778744931; 52°04′03″N 0°53′03″E		1284818	Church of St Peter More images
Church of All Saints	Little Cornard	Church	15th century	23 March 1961	TL9016639096; 52°01′04″N 0°46′12″E		1181529	Church of All Saints More images
Church of St Lawrence	Little Waldingfield	Church	15th century	23 March 1961	TL9241745158; 52°04′17″N 0°48′22″E		1181618	Church of St Lawrence More images
Church of the Holy Trinity	Long Melford	Church	1495	9 February 1978	TL8650946760; 52°05′16″N 0°43′15″E		1182550	Church of the Holy Trinity More images
Kentwell Hall including detached building to the west, brick revetment of moat and two bridges over moat.	Long Melford	Country house	16th century	10 January 1953	TL8633047945; 52°05′54″N 0°43′08″E		1183113	Kentwell Hall including detached building to the west, brick revetment of moat and two bridges over moat. More images
Melford Hall	Long Melford	Country house	1559	10 January 1953	TL8665146181; 52°04′57″N 0°43′21″E		1033702	Melford Hall More images
Trinity Hospital	Long Melford	Almshouse	1573	10 January 1953	TL8652946698; 52°05′14″N 0°43′16″E		1036554	Trinity Hospital More images
Church of St Peter	Milden	Church	13th century	23 January 1958	TL9584446541; 52°04′57″N 0°51′25″E		1037111	Church of St Peter More images
Church of St Peter	Monks Eleigh	Church	15th century	23 January 1958	TL9662147752; 52°05′35″N 0°52′08″E		1351546	Church of St Peter More images
Alston Court	Nayland	House	15th century	10 January 1953	TL9750634206; 51°58′16″N 0°52′26″E		1033571	Alston Court More images
Church of St James	Nayland	Church	15th century	23 March 1961	TL9756434223; 51°58′17″N 0°52′29″E		1033597	Church of St James More images
Church of St Mary Wiston	Wissington	Church	11th century	23 March 1961	TL9546033265; 51°57′49″N 0°50′37″E		1351854	Church of St Mary Wiston More images
Church of St Mary	Naughton	Church	14th century	23 January 1958	TM0224648932; 52°06′06″N 0°57′06″E		1284646	Church of St Mary More images
Church of St Mary	Nedging	Church	Late Norman	23 January 1958	TL9984948202; 52°05′46″N 0°54′58″E		1351560	Church of St Mary More images
Church of St Mary	Polstead	Church	12th century	23 January 1958	TL9890338073; 52°00′20″N 0°53′47″E		1284554	Church of St Mary More images
Church of St Mary	Preston St Mary	Church	15th century	23 January 1958	TL9460250276; 52°07′00″N 0°50′27″E		1037055	Church of St Mary More images
Church of St George	Shimpling	Church	12th century	23 March 1961	TL8596451289; 52°07′43″N 0°42′55″E		1033556	Church of St George More images
Church of All Saints	Upper Somerton	Church	13th century	23 March 1961	TL8108653015; 52°08′45″N 0°38′42″E		1033564	Church of All Saints More images
Church of St Mary	Stoke-by-Nayland	Church	15th century	23 March 1961	TL9862836281; 51°59′22″N 0°53′29″E		1200030	Church of St Mary More images
Giffords Hall	Stoke-by-Nayland	House	16th century	10 January 1953	TM0180837432; 51°59′55″N 0°56′18″E		1283138	Giffords Hall More images
Church of St Mary	Stratford St Mary	Church	14th century	22 February 1955	TM0522134610; 51°58′19″N 0°59′11″E		1283820	Church of St Mary More images
Church of All Saints	Sudbury	Church	15th century	3 March 1952	TL8687440974; 52°02′08″N 0°43′23″E		1037522	Church of All Saints More images
Church of St Gregory	Sudbury	Church	14th century	3 March 1952	TL8705441486; 52°02′25″N 0°43′33″E		1037548	Church of St Gregory More images
Church of St Peter	Sudbury	Church	c.1485	3 March 1952	TL8743841325; 52°02′19″N 0°43′53″E		1180665	Church of St Peter More images
Gainsborough's House	Sudbury	House	17th century	3 March 1952	TL8723141269; 52°02′18″N 0°43′42″E		1037480	Gainsborough's House More images
Salter's Hall	Sudbury	House	c.1450	3 March 1952	TL8698041232; 52°02′17″N 0°43′29″E		1181004	Salter's Hall More images
The Chantry	Sudbury	House	Post 15th century	3 March 1952	TL8699741232; 52°02′17″N 0°43′30″E		1351381	The Chantry More images
Church of St Mary the Virgin	Thorpe Morieux	Church	14th century	23 January 1958	TL9435353351; 52°08′39″N 0°50′20″E		1351578	Church of St Mary the Virgin More images
Church of St Lawrence, formerly Church of All Saints	Little Wenham	Church	13th century	22 February 1955	TM0809639171; 52°00′43″N 1°01′51″E		1033410	Church of St Lawrence, formerly Church of All Saints More images
Little Wenham Castle	Little Wenham	House	c.1290	22 February 1955	TM0807739069; 52°00′40″N 1°01′50″E		1033405	Little Wenham Castle More images
Church of St Margaret	Whatfield	Church	14th century	23 January 1958	TM0249546630; 52°04′52″N 0°57′14″E		1284413	Church of St Margaret More images
Woolverstone Hall	Woolverstone Park, Woolverstone	Country house	1776	22 February 1955	TM1938838662; 52°00′11″N 1°11′41″E		1204081	Woolverstone Hall More images

== See also ==
- Grade II* listed buildings in Babergh
- List of Grade I listed buildings in Suffolk
