= Cornard =

Cornard may refer to:

- Cornard Tye, a hamlet in Suffolk, England
- Great Cornard, a village in Suffolk, England
  - Cornard United F.C., a football team from Great Cornard
- Little Cornard, a village in Suffolk, England
