= Lavenham Priory =

Priory in Suffolk, England

Coordinates: 52.1073°N 0.7965°E

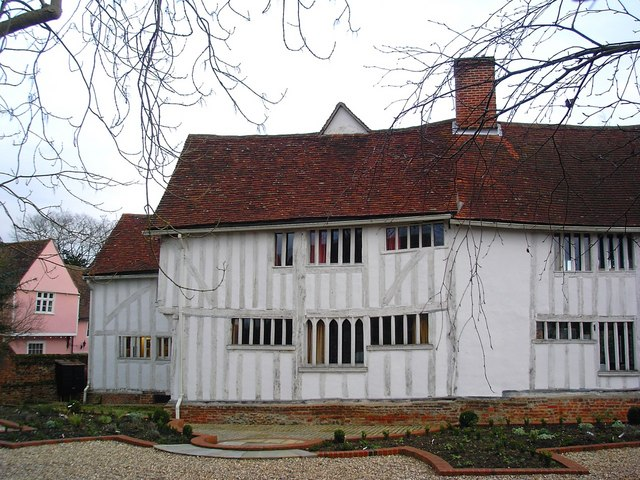
Lavenham Priory - rear view

Lavenham Priory is a 13th-century Grade I listed building in Lavenham, Suffolk, England.

Aubrey de Vere I was the Lord of the manor, according to the Domesday Book of 1086. In the early 13th Century De Vere gifted the property to an Order of Benedictine Monks. It was a monastic house until probably the early part of the 15th Century, after which it was acquired by Roger Ruggles - who made a fortune from the cloth industry. It is rumoured that Henry VIII's Comptroller was dispatched to Lavenham (and specifically to Lavenham Priory) and fined the then owner the equivalent today of £1 million for "displaying too much ostentatious wealth". This may explain the Tudor pargeting on the front of the building.

For the past 20 years Lavenham Priory has operated as a boutique guest house.
