= Willy Lott's Cottage =

Suffolk house depicted in famous painting

Coordinates: 51°57′30″N 1°1′19″E

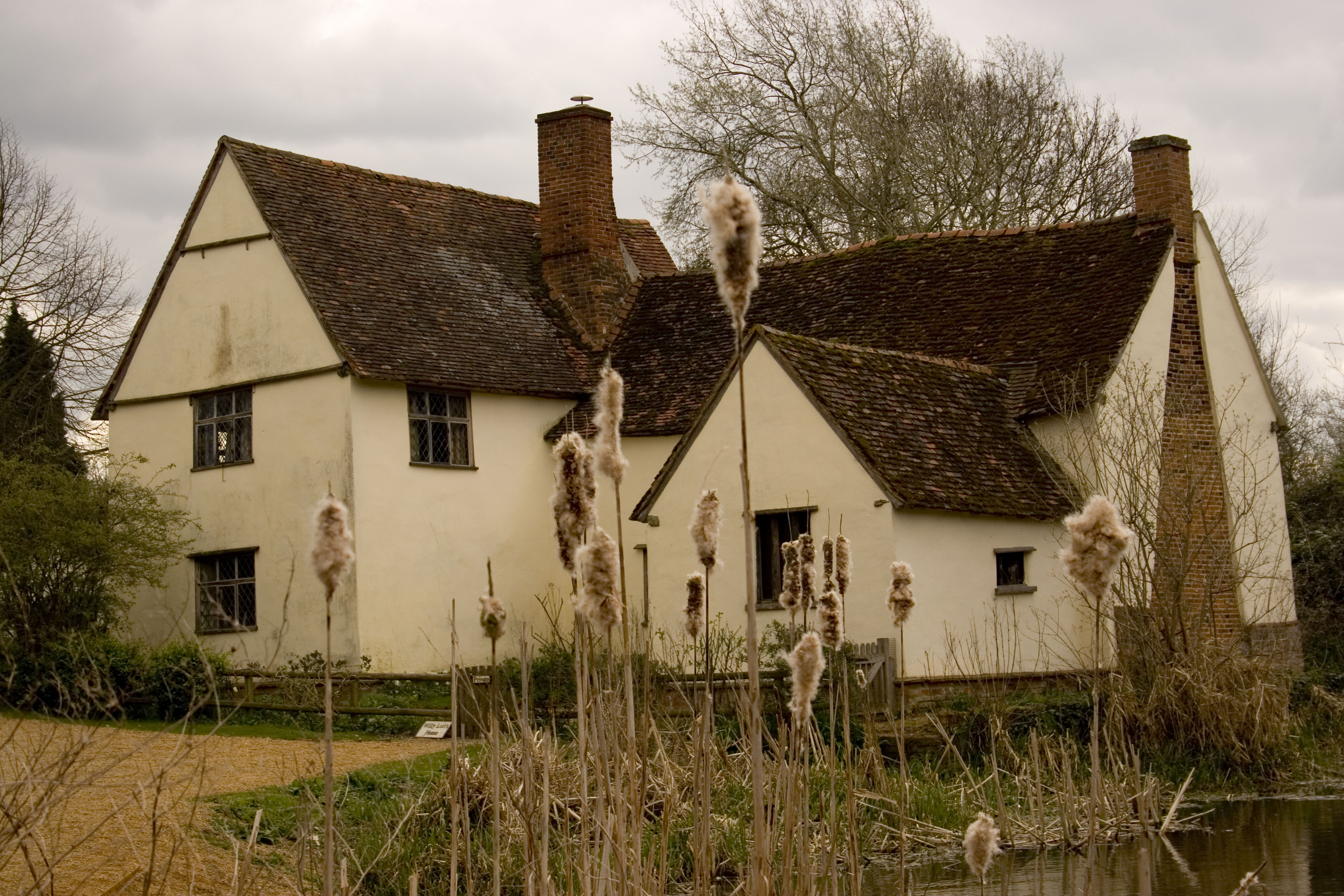
Willy Lott's Cottage

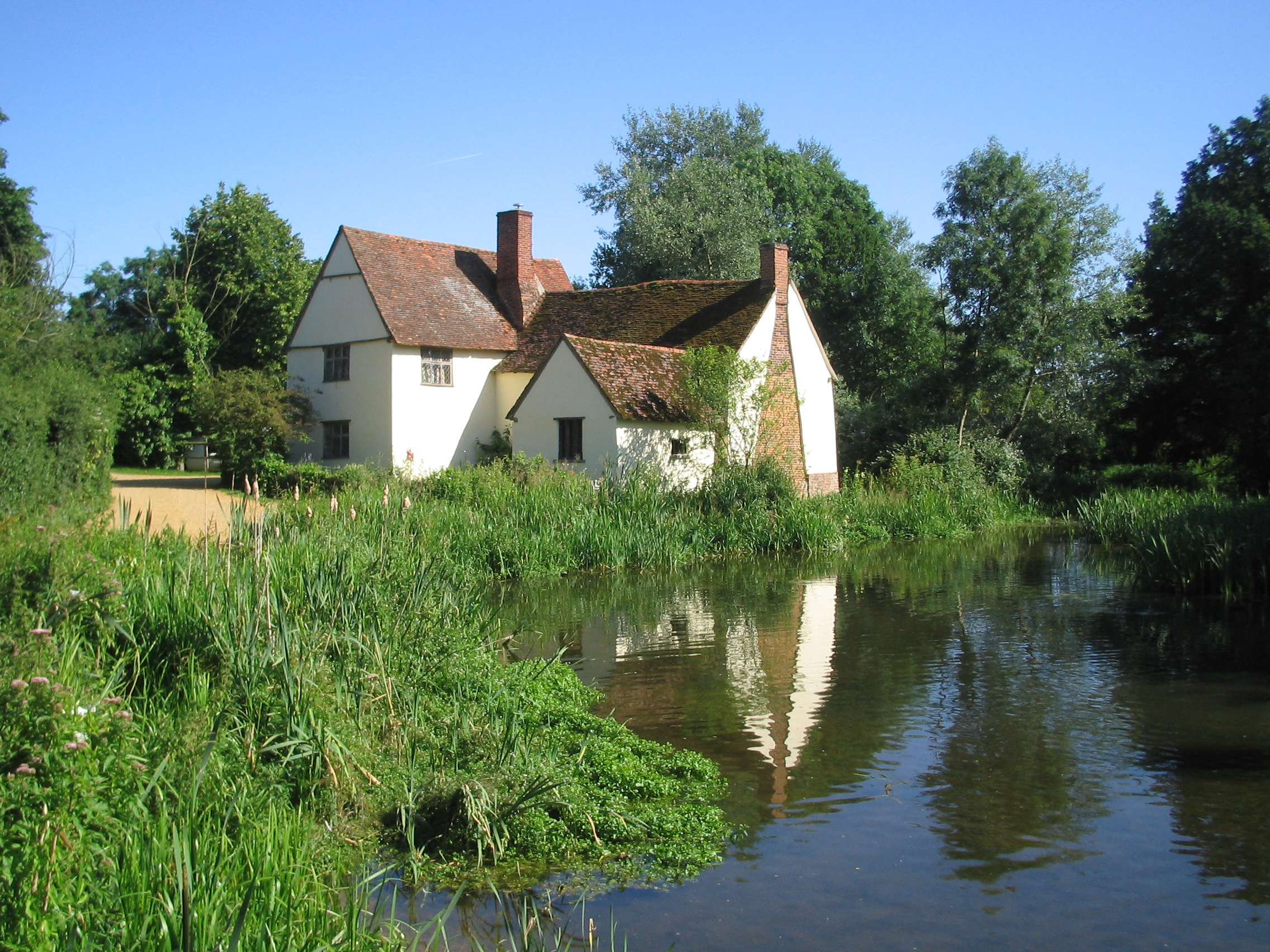
Willy Lott's Cottage

Willy Lott's Cottage (or Willy Lott's House) is a building in Flatford, East Bergholt, Suffolk, England, which appears in several paintings by John Constable, notably The Hay Wain.

The property is a Grade I listed building, reflecting its importance "as part of the Flatford Mill group" and "its significance in the work of the artist John Constable".

The earliest part of the building is sixteenth century. It was restored in the 1920s after a revival of interest in Constable's paintings. It has been renamed Willy Lott's House as that is the name Constable used in his paintings. It is owned by the National Trust. The cottage was purchased in 1926 by Thomas Parkington; after his death in 1943, the National Trust purchased it from his estate.

The cottage is located on the bank of the River Stour, just downstream from Flatford Mill in the heart of Dedham Vale, a typically English rural landscape. Flatford Mill, along with neighbouring Valley Farm and Bridge Cottage, are leased to the Field Studies Council, which uses them as locations for arts-based courses such as painting, and as accommodation for science-based courses such as residential ecology trips for students up to A-level.

== William Lott ==
The cottage takes its name from its resident at the time John Constable did his paintings, when the house was known as Gibeons Gate Farm. William Lott (1761–1849), a tenant farmer, lived at Gibeons Farm and spent only four nights away from this house in his life. According to a 2020 article, "Willy Lott himself became famous thanks to Constable, but only after his death".

The Story of Willy Lott and his Cottage (2023) has been published by Brian Lott, the gt-gt-gt-grandson of Willy's brother John Lott (1758-1827).

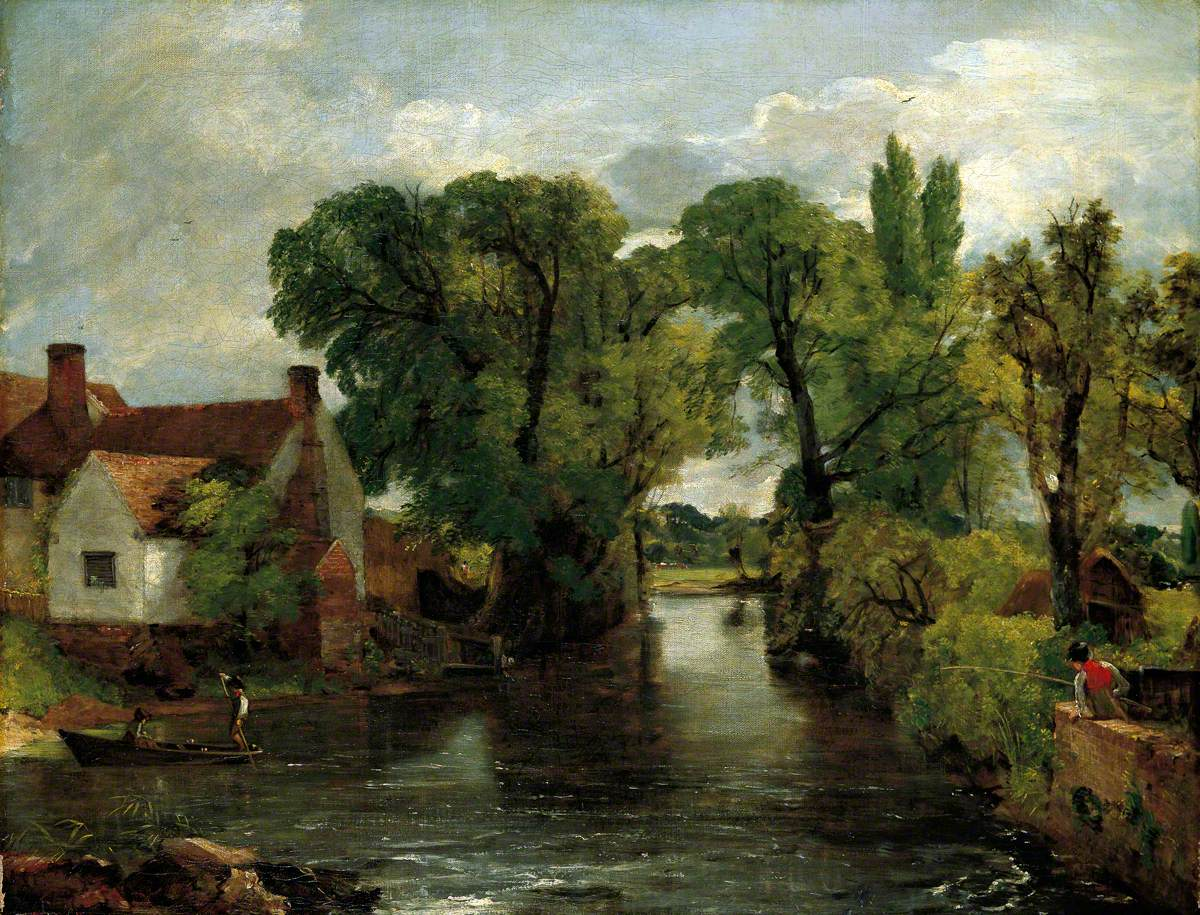
The Mill Stream, 1814

Willy Lott's House from the Stour, 1818

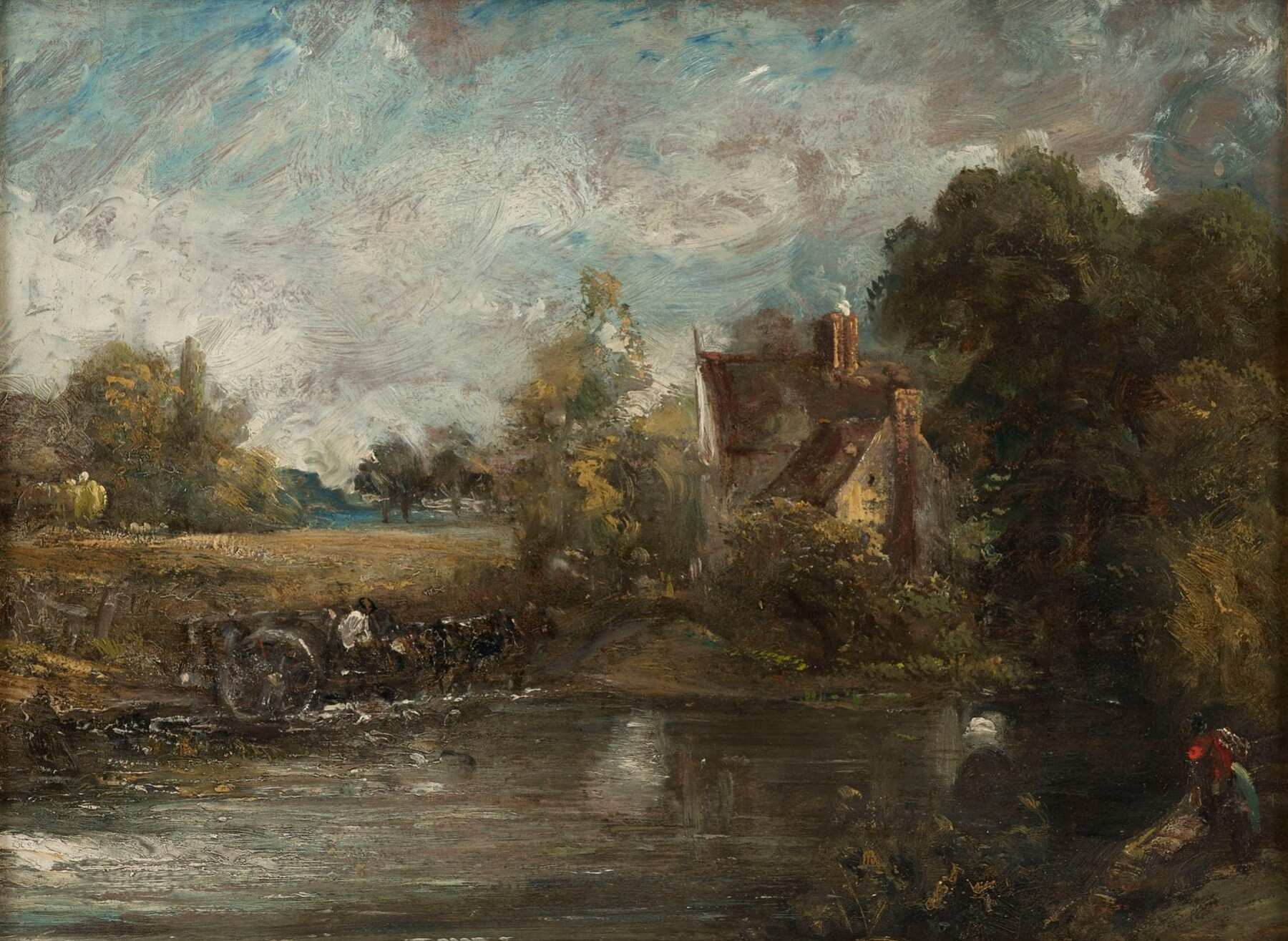
Willy Lott's Cottage by John Constable, circa 1820

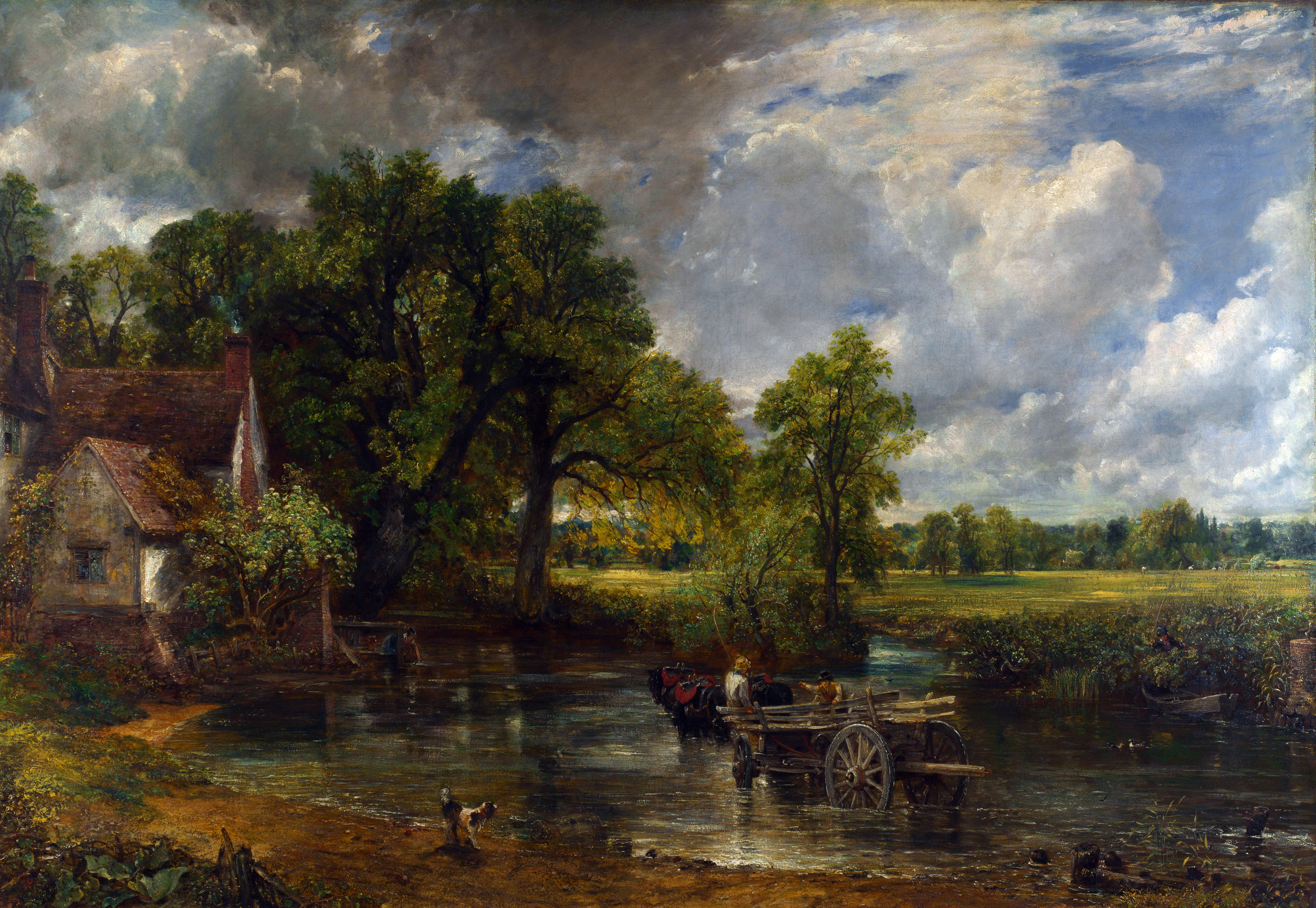
The Hay Wain by John Constable, 1821

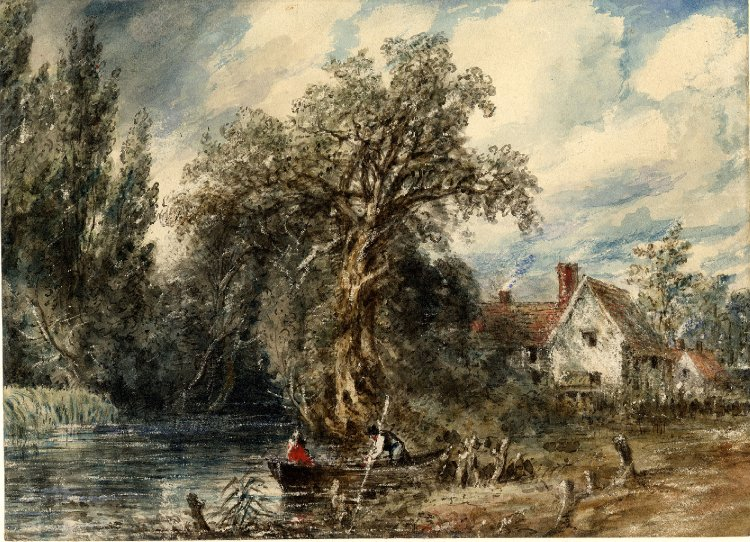
Willy Lott's Cottage by John Constable, 1832
