= St James' Chapel, Lindsey =

Church in Lindsey, Suffolk, England

Coordinates: 52.06267°N 0.88383°E

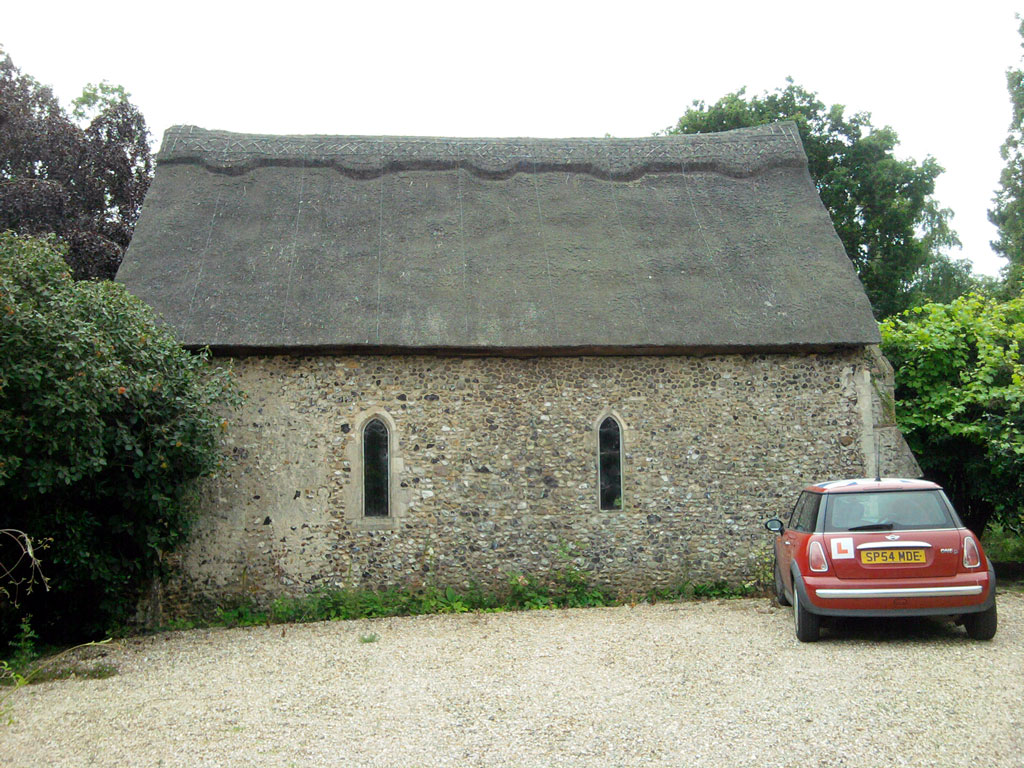
St James' Chapel, north side

St James' Chapel is a 13th-century chapel located near the village of Lindsey, Suffolk, which served as a chantry chapel for nearby Lindsey castle. It is recorded in the National Heritage List for England as a designated Grade I listed building and scheduled monument.

== Origins ==
The foundation date of the chapel is unknown, and whilst a majority of the stonework is 13th century, earlier stone has been reused in the construction. The chapel was in use until 1545 when it was dissolved. After dissolution, the King granted the property to Thomas Turner, who converted the building into a barn.

== Description ==
The medieval church was constructed with brick, stone and flint. It measures 8.8 m (29 ft) x 4.87 m (16.0 ft), and is also 3.3 metres (11 ft) in height, from floor to roof line. The 13th century structure was also includes reused stones from an earlier era. Lancet windows and a stone arched doorway survive in the original south wall. On the north wall, two original windows have been bricked in and plastered over. A third original window was converted to a doorway. A three-light window remains in the east wall. The west wall contains a bricked up window and a brick doorway. The church also contains a late 13th-century piscina (shallow basin) with trefoil arch.

== History ==
The chapel was dedicated to St James the Apostle and originated as a chantry chapel serving nearby Lindsey Castle, of which only earthwork remains survive just over 200 metres (660 ft) to the south-east of the chapel. In 1240 Nesta de Cockfield, mistress of Lindsey Castle, granted the churches in Lindsey and Kersey to Kersey Priory, and in 1242 imposed an extra tax on Cockfield to help keep maintain a constant lighting within the chapel. These form the first documentary evidence of the chapel. It was later repaired in the late 15th or early 16th centuries. The repairs included the lowering of the roof and the installation of roof timbers. The chapel was possibly shortened in length during this time. St James' continued as a chapel until 1545 when it was dissolved as a "free chapel". In 1545, Thomas Turner was granted the chapel by the king, which he later into a barn. It is believed that the tie-beam roof covered with thatch was added during the barn conversion, replacing the original tile roof.

== Gallery ==
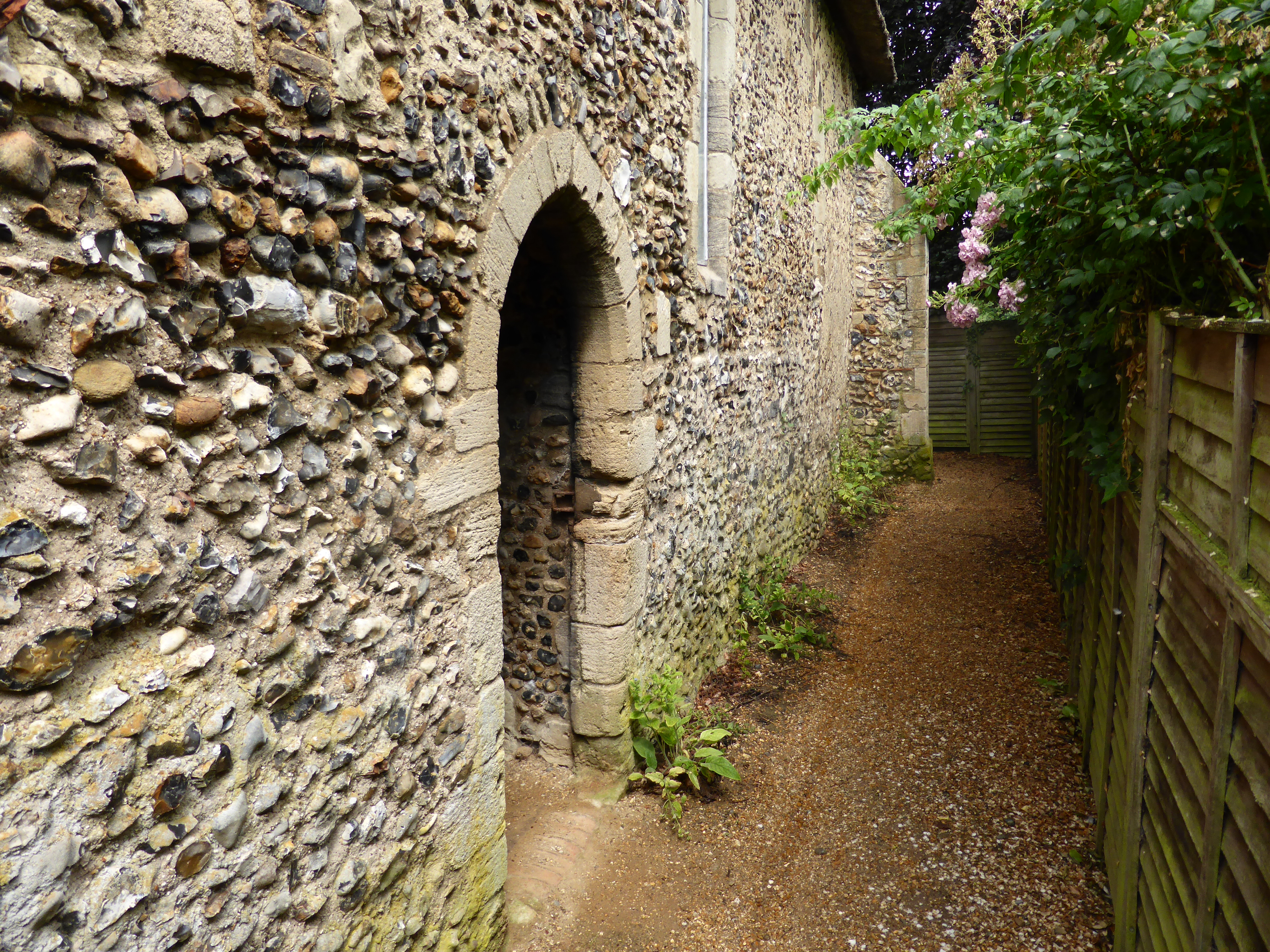
Exterior wall, St James

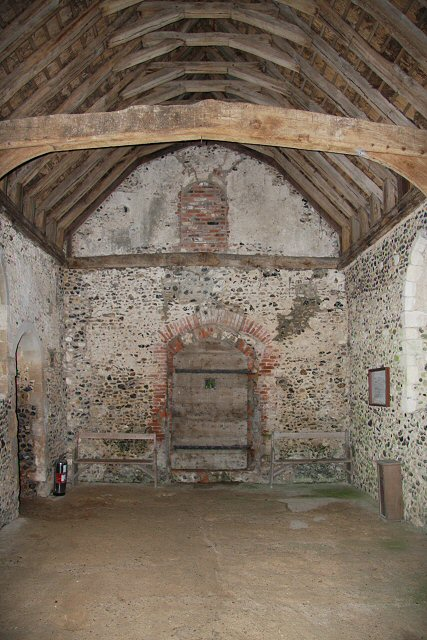
St James interior

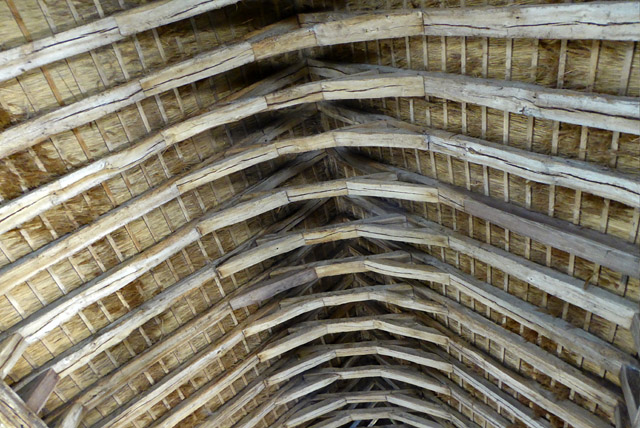
St James roof

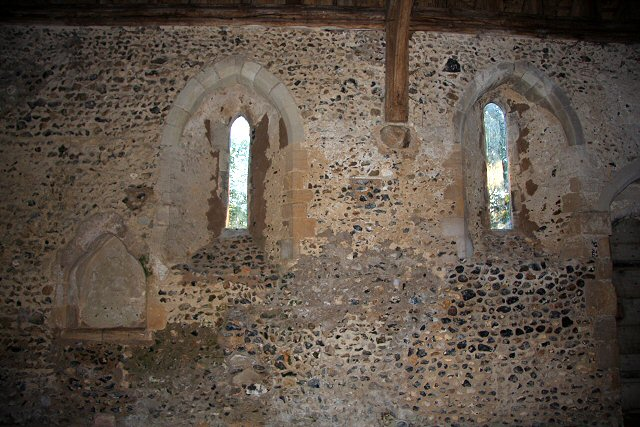
Lancet windows, St James
