= Alpheton =

Village in Suffolk, England

Coordinates: 52.12294°N 0.74866°E

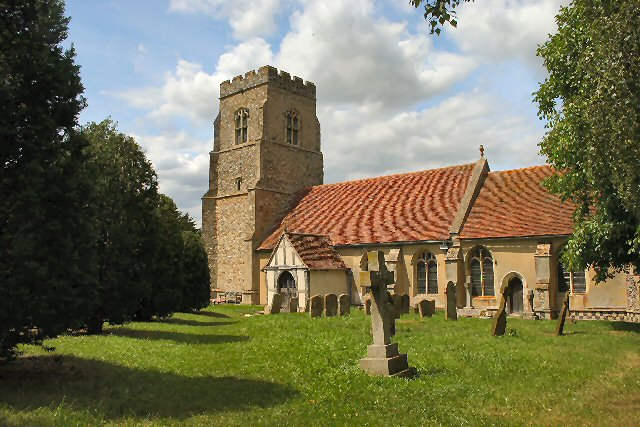
- Church of St Peter and St Paul, Alpheton

- Location within Suffolk
- Interactive map of Alpheton
- Area: 4.94 km^{2} (1.91 sq mi)
- Population: 256 (2011)
  - Density: 52/km^{2} (130/sq mi)
- OS grid reference: TL882507
- District: Babergh
- Shire county: Suffolk
- Region: East
- Country: England
- Sovereign state: United Kingdom
- Post town: SUDBURY
- Postcode district: CO10
- Dialling code: 01284
- Police: Suffolk
- Fire: Suffolk
- Ambulance: East of England
- UK Parliament: South Suffolk

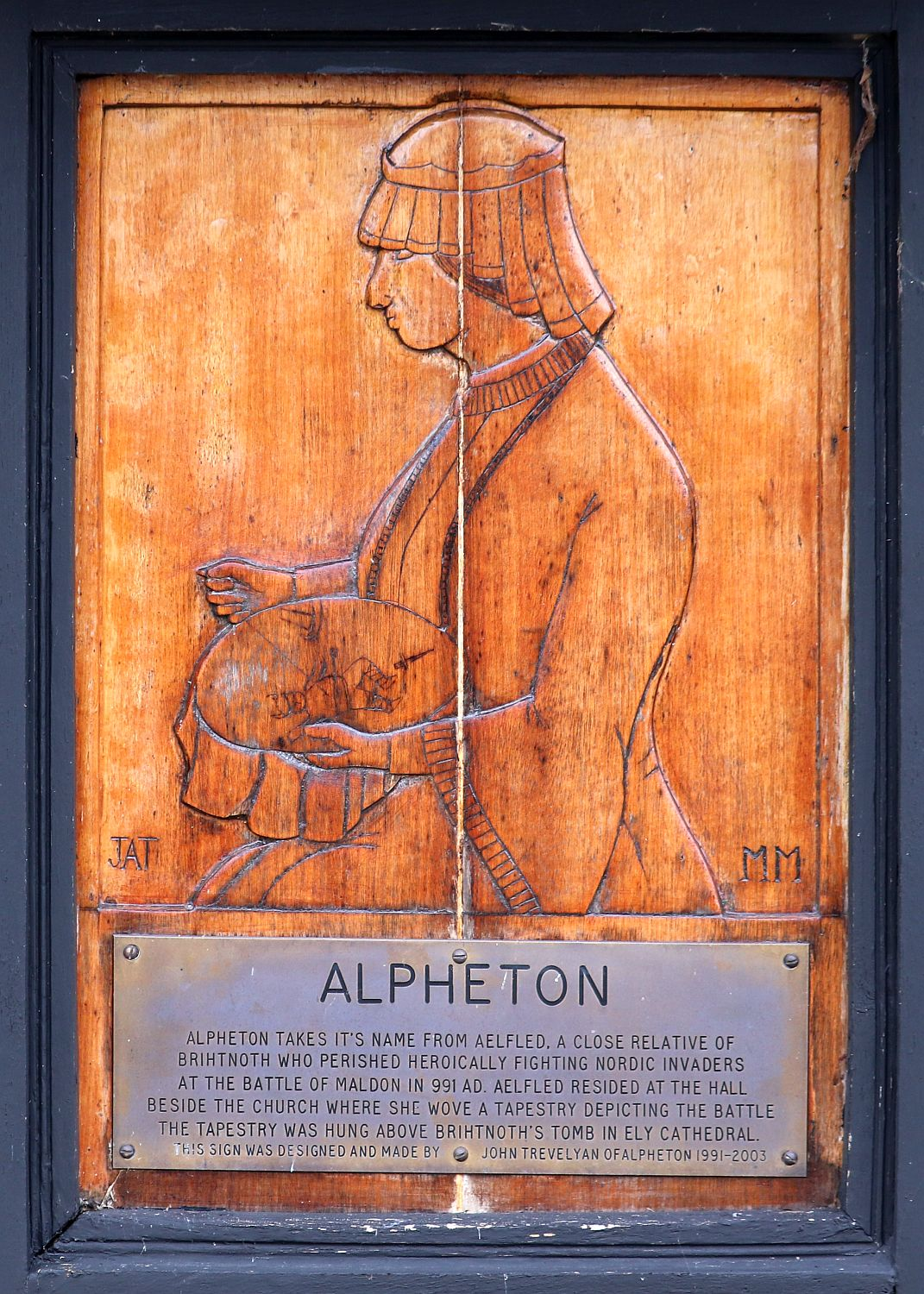
Alpheton village sign detail

Alpheton is a village and civil parish in the Babergh district of Suffolk, England. Located on the A134 road about six miles north of Sudbury, in 2005 it had a population of 260, reducing to 256 at the 2011 Census. According to Eilert Ekwall the meaning of the village name is the homestead of Aelfled.

== History ==
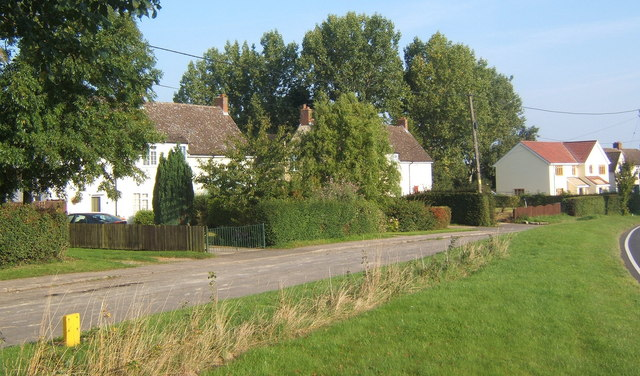
Houses in Alpheton and a stretch of the old road

=== Background ===
Alpheton is a small but active and welcoming community. The garage on Tye Green is a well-known landmark for those passing through on the A134. Homes, both old and new, are situated along the main road (also known as Old Bury Road), Church Lane and Roseacre to the south-west of Tye Green, The Glebe and Old Bury Road to the north of the village. To the south of the Alpheton is the hamlet of Bridge Street which is also transected by the A134.

=== Early records ===
Although the records are sketchy, Alpheton was founded, it is believed, by Aefflead, whose husband Byrthnoth, Earl of Essex, was killed at the Battle of Maldon, on the Blackwater River in Essex, in AD 991.

Aefflead was the sister-in-law of the Saxon king Edmund the Elder, and following the battle and the death of her husband, she moved north from Maldon and settled in what was originally called Aefflead's Tun (estate) and probably lived in Alpheton Hall. The name was altered through the ages and is described as Alfreton in the Domesday Book. The origin of the present name is not known, but it would appear that it was a variation on the previous ones.

=== Later history ===
The village has changed little over the centuries and has maintained a rural farming existence. There are now four farms in the village, Alpheton Hall, Clapstile Farm, Tye Farm and the largest, Lavenham Lodge. Before the war many of the properties in the village were occupied by people working on the farms. Housing is now a mixture of local authority and privately owned homes.

=== Two World Wars ===
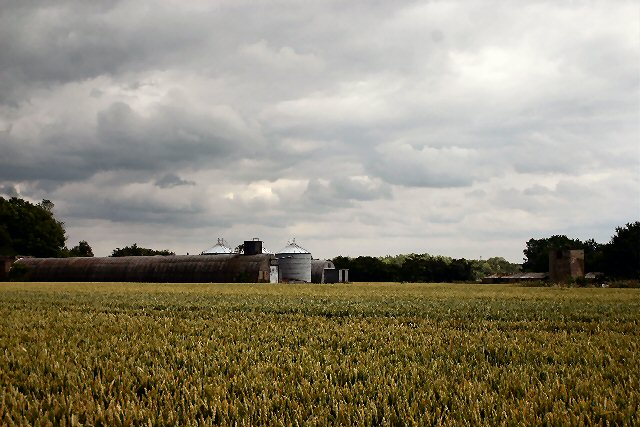
Former airfield buildings at Clapstile Farm

Many of the young men of the village fought in The First World War and the names of those who died are inscribed on a marble tablet in the Church. In 1936 the School in the Glebe closed and all the Alpheton pupils had to go to Shimpling. The school building initially became the Village Hall and then a private house when the new hall was built.

In 1939, the Land Girls of the Women's Land Army appeared in Alpheton. They came to help with the work in the fields and they were billeted in homes around the village. The Old Rectory alone had 30 living in all the rooms, which were converted to make dormitories and a sitting room. Other newcomers were the evacuees from the East End of London.

In 1941 construction of the Alpheton/Lavenham Airfield began on the land belonging to Lavenham Lodge Farm. Many Irish workers moved in to work for the construction giant Laings and were accommodated in the Old School. Work on the airfield was completed by 1943 and operational aircraft arrived in 1944. They were B24H and B24J Liberator bombers of 487th Bombardment Group, part of 8th Airforce of the United States. They were later reinforced by B17 Flying Fortresses who remained for a year until the end of the war.

=== Post-war changes ===
The Red Lion, known as "The 'alf eaton lion", suffered so much loss of trade from the diversion of the road that it could not keep going and closed in 1964. The closure of the Post Office and the village shop followed in 1975.

== Governance ==
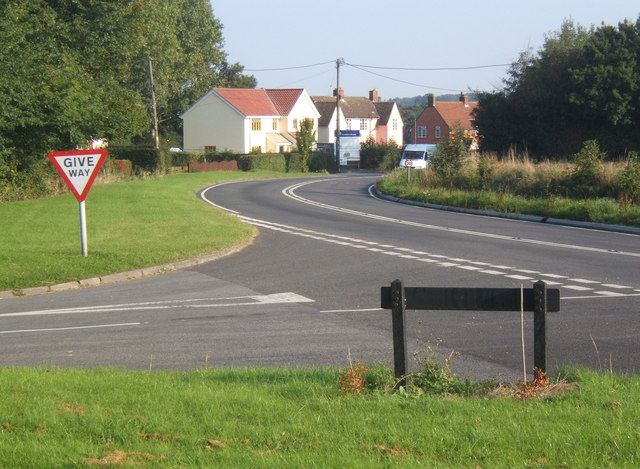
A134 curving north through Alpheton

Alpheton lies in the Babergh district of the shire county of Suffolk. The three tiers of local government are administered by Suffolk County Council, Babergh District Council, and the 7-member Alpheton Parish Council. The parish does not currently have a Parish Plan or Village Design Statement.

== Community facilities ==
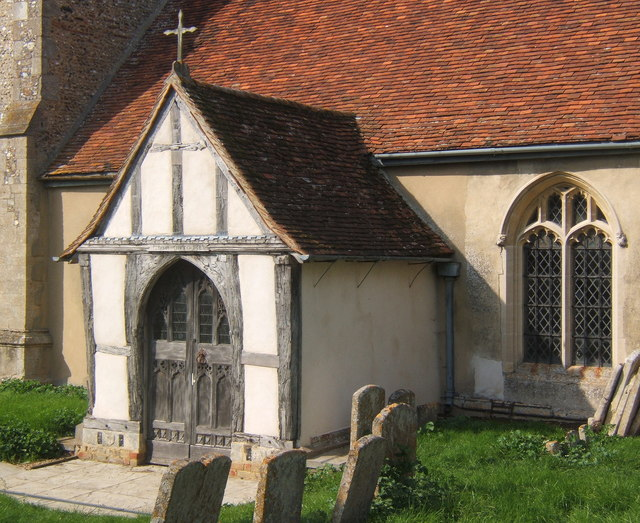
Alpheton Church entrance

The church of St Peter and St Paul, at the end of Church Lane next to Alpheton Hall, is believed to date from the 10th century. Although there is no indication of its dedication prior to the Reformation, it probably served as a Chapel for the residents of the Hall. The Village Hall was built in 1977 for the Elizabeth II's Silver Jubilee and is the focal point for many village activities. There is a small recreation ground next to the Village Hall.

== Listed buildings ==
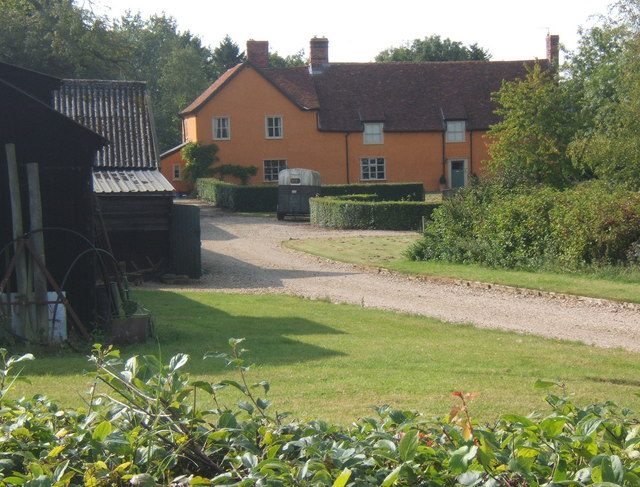
Alpheton Hall

English Heritage lists the following listed buildings within the parish of Alpheton.

=== Grade I ===
- St Peter and St Paul Church

=== Grade II* ===
- Mill House, Bridge Street

=== Grade II ===
- Alpheton Hall
- Barn at Old Hall Farm
- Elms Farmhouse
- Old Rectory
- Post Office and House adjoining
- Clapstile Farmhouse
- Bridge Cottage, Bridge Street
- Wash Farmhouse, Bridge Street
- Tye Farmhouse, Church Lane
- Thatched Cottage, Church Lane
- Tallage, The Tye
- Woodhall, The Green
- Smithy Cottage, Tye Green
- Tye Green Cottage, Tye Green

NB: The above property details represent the names and addresses that were used at the time that the buildings were listed. In some instances the name of the building may have changed over the intervening years

== Planning ==
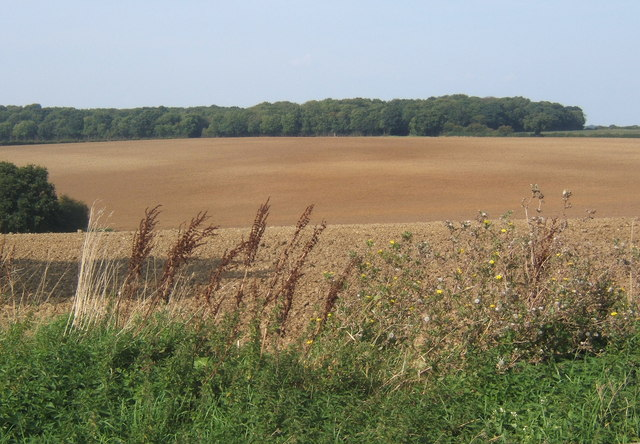
Fields north of Church Lane, Alpheton

In the adopted Babergh Local Plan Alteration No. 2 (2006) Alpheton does not have a defined Built-up area boundary on the Proposals Map and there are no sites allocated for new residential development.

Much of the parish is within an area defined as Special Landscape Area.

== Landscape ==
Within the Suffolk Landscape Character Assessment the parish of Alpheton is within an area defined as

- Rolling valley farmlands – This landscape has small and medium-sized fields on the valley sides with an organic form which was created by the piecemeal enclosure of common arable and pasture lands. As with the other valley side landscapes the field size tends to increase on the upper sides and plateaux edges of these valleys. Overall the growth and development of villages and small towns in this landscape has been driven by the quality of the land and the agricultural prosperity that it brought. Ancient woodland is mainly confined to the upper slopes of the valleys and is mostly in relatively small parcels.
- Ancient rolling farmlands – This is a rolling arable landscape of chalky clays and loams. The enclosure over a lot of the landscape retains much of the organic pattern of ancient and species-rich hedgerows and associated ditches. There are however some areas of field amalgamation and boundary loss, especially on the interfluves between the small valleys. The settlement pattern is dispersed farmsteads of mediaeval origin interspersed with some larger hamlets and occasional villages. The farms are large but are mainly owner-occupied rather than estate owned. The hedgerow trees are of typical clayland composition: oak, ash and field maple, with suckering elm. Although there are some areas of extensive field amalgamation, overall the landscape is largely intact, and accessible thorough a dense network of winding roads with wide verges.

== Transport ==
Shimpling is served by one bus service operated by Hedingham & Chambers:

- 375: Glemsford / Long Melford – Alpheton – Shimpling – Lawshall – Hawstead – Bury St Edmunds (sponsored by Suffolk County Council)

== Education ==
The village is served by All Saint's CEVCP School, Lawshall, a primary school currently catering for pupils aged 5–11.

Older children attend Hardwick Middle School and King Edward VI CEVC Upper School in Bury St Edmunds.

== Local Organisations ==
- Alpheton Women's Institute

== Demography ==
According to the Office for National Statistics, at the time of the United Kingdom Census 2001, Alpheton had a population of 242 with 96 households., increasing to 256 at the 2011 Census.

Patrick Jordan, tv and film character actor, died here, on 10 January 2020.

=== Population change ===
Population growth in Alpheton from 1801 to 1891
Year	1801	1811	1821	1831	1841	1851	1881	1891
Population	204	208	264	309	321	370	249	234
Source: A Vision of Britain Through Time

Population growth in Alpheton from 1901 to 2001
Year	1901	1911	1921	1931	1951	1961	2001
Population	244	229	213	189	219	203	242
Source: A Vision of Britain Through Time
