= Valley Farm, East Bergholt =

Farmhouse in Suffolk, England

Coordinates: 51.9591°N 1.0223°E

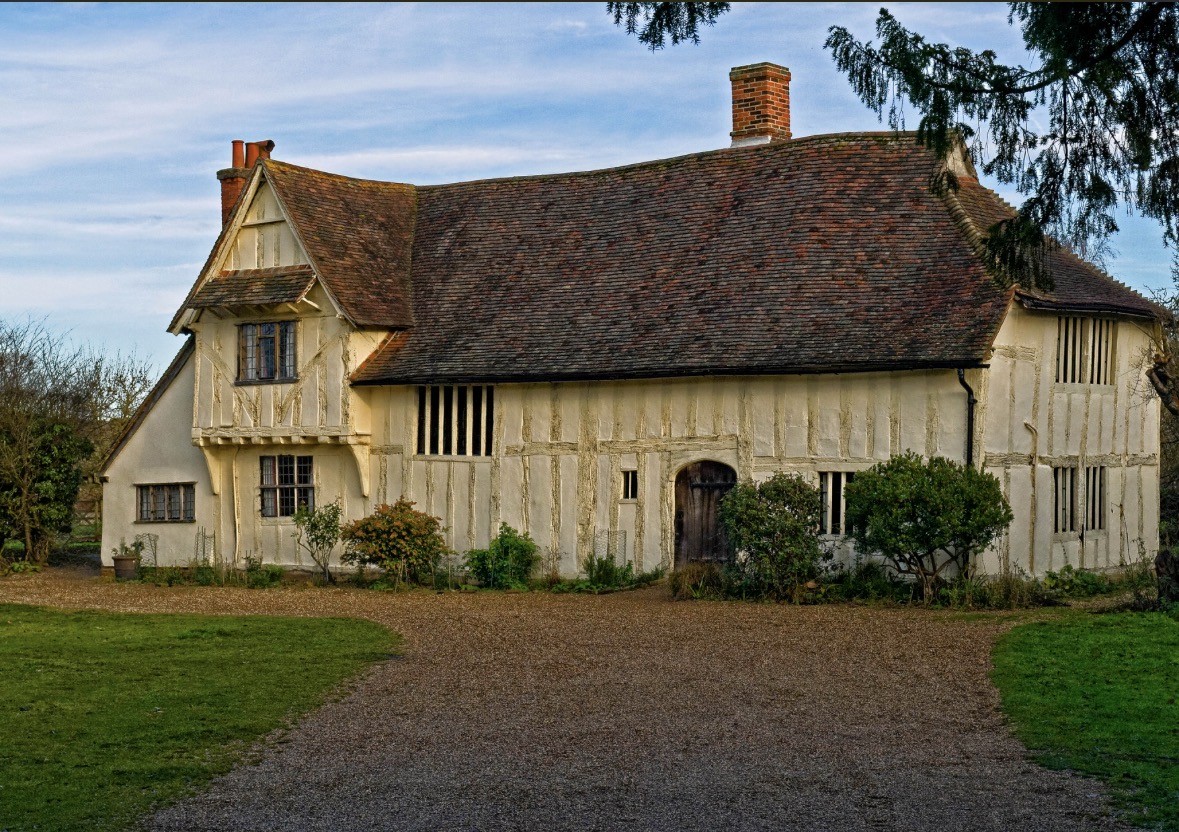
Valley Farmhouse in East Bergholt, Suffolk

Valley Farm is a farmhouse in Flatford, Suffolk. The building is a Grade I listed building, parts of which date back to the 15th century.

== Architecture ==
It has a late-15th-century open hall, with some 14th-century elements incorporated in a cross wing.
