= Lindsey, Suffolk =

Village in Suffolk, England

Coordinates: 52.067°N 0.885°E

Lindsey
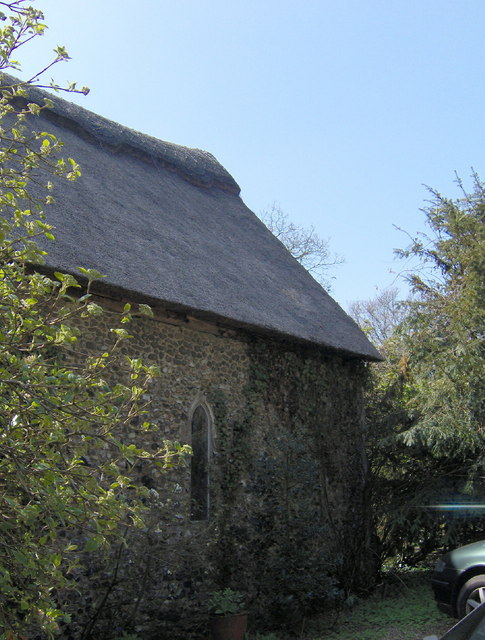
- St James Chapel, Lindsey

- Location within Suffolk
- Population: 208 (2011)
- OS grid reference: TL977449
- Civil parish: Lindsey
- District: Babergh
- Shire county: Suffolk
- Region: East
- Country: England
- Sovereign state: United Kingdom
- Post town: Ipswich
- Postcode district: IP7
- Dialling code: 01449 / 01787 (Split)

Lindsey is a village and civil parish in the Babergh district, in mid-to-south Suffolk, England. In 2011 the parish had a population of 208.

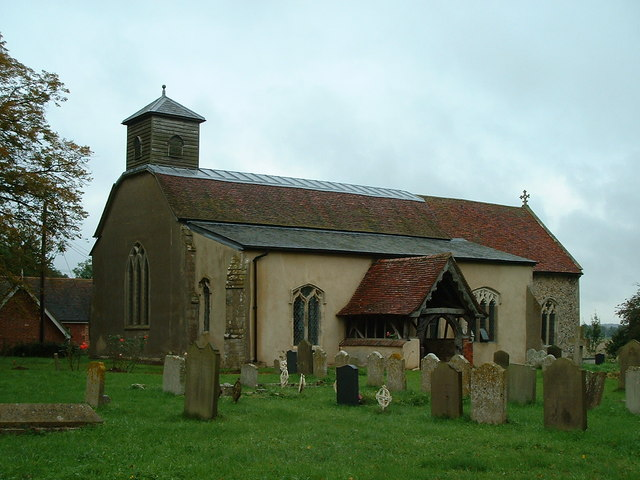
St Peter's church

== History ==
The name Lindsey derives from the Old English personal name "Lelli", and the Anglian term "ēg", which in this context likely refers to dry land surrounded by wetland and marsh.

By 1086, the village was of some size, comprising 50 households of whom 38 were the property of the Abbey of (Bury) St Edmunds, and 12 belonged to Richard Fitz Gilbert (De Clare). In contrast, the modern town of Hadleigh nearby had 49 households, and the neighbouring village of Kersey only 28.

At some stage during the eleventh and twelfth centuries Lindsey castle, otherwise known as "Boars Hill", was constructed within the parish. The site was owned by Adam de Cockfield during the Anarchy. During this period, the strength of the castle saw the Abbot of St Edmunds grant him control of the nearby parishes of Groton and Semer in order to defend them. It later passed to Thomas de Burgh through marriage to Nesta De Cockfield, and he applied for a licence to crenellate the site in 1204. The couple, and Nesta in particular, were frequent donors to nearby Kersey Priory. As a consequence, the existence of a medieval mill within Lindsey is shown when Nesta donated the tithes from the site to the priory in the thirteenth century.

== Layout ==
The parish contains the villages and hamlets of Lindsey, Lindsey Tye (grid reference TL982459) and Rose Green and collectively they contain about 92 households, albeit over a wide area.

Rose Green contains four listed buildings: Chapel of St James, Rose Green Farmhouse, White Rose Inn, and an unnamed cottage.

Sights in the area include St James's Chapel, a thirteenth-century thatched chapel under the protection of English Heritage.
