= St Mary's Church, Brent Eleigh =

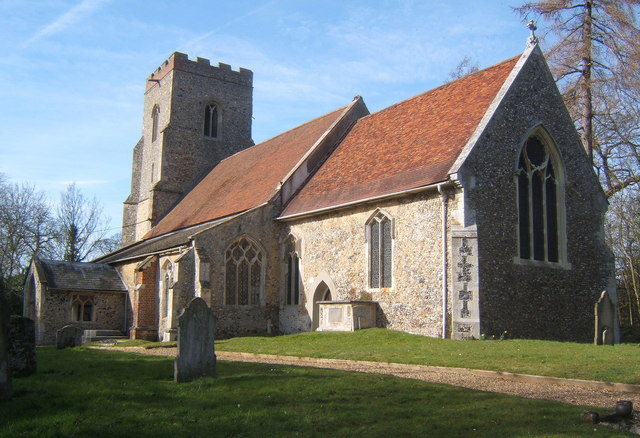
- St Mary's Church, Brent Eleigh
- 52.0984°N 0.833944°E
- Address: Hall Road, Brent Eleigh
- Denomination: Church of England

History
- Dedication: St Mary the Virgin

Administration
- Diocese: Diocese of St Edmundsbury and Ipswich
- Deanery: Lavenham
- Parish: Brent Eleigh

The church of St Mary the Virgin is the parish church of Brent Eleigh, Suffolk, England. It is a Grade I listed building. It was built around 1250.

== History ==
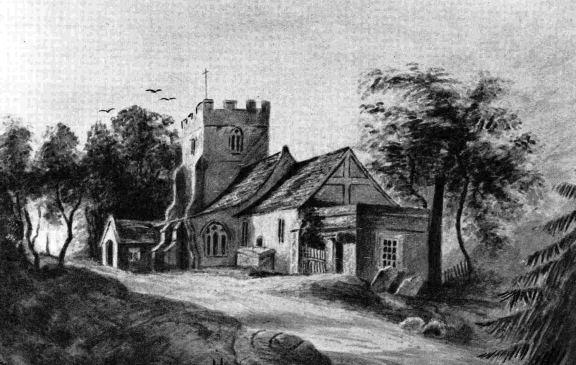
St Mary's Church, Brent Eleigh, early 19th century showing brick-built library building

John Fitch, the Rector in 1986 described the church as exhibiting the Decorated Gothic style by which he dates the building to the late 13th- to early 14th-century period. Other features

In 1709 Henry Colman left his substantial library to the "use of the Church of Brentily that is the incumbent Minister there". In 1720 Nicholas Thurloe, the vicar, signed a bond with Charles Trimnell, the Bishop of Norwich wherein he took responsibility for 1700 volumes covering over 1500 titles. These were housed in a brick-built building added to the eastern end of the church.

=== Rectors ===
- 1586 Henry Dawson
- 1594 John Bulbrooke
- 1625 Thomas Colman, father of Edward Colman, the Catholic courtier targeted by Titus Oates as being involved in the fictitious "Popish Plot" and subsequently executed in 1678.
- 1662 William Gilbert, cousin of Edward Colman.

== Features in church ==
=== Font and box pews ===
The font is often described as exhibiting the Early English Gothic style associated with a period slightly earlier in the 13th century than the rest of the church. The nave features 18th-century box pews which enclose some earlier 17th-century bench ends.

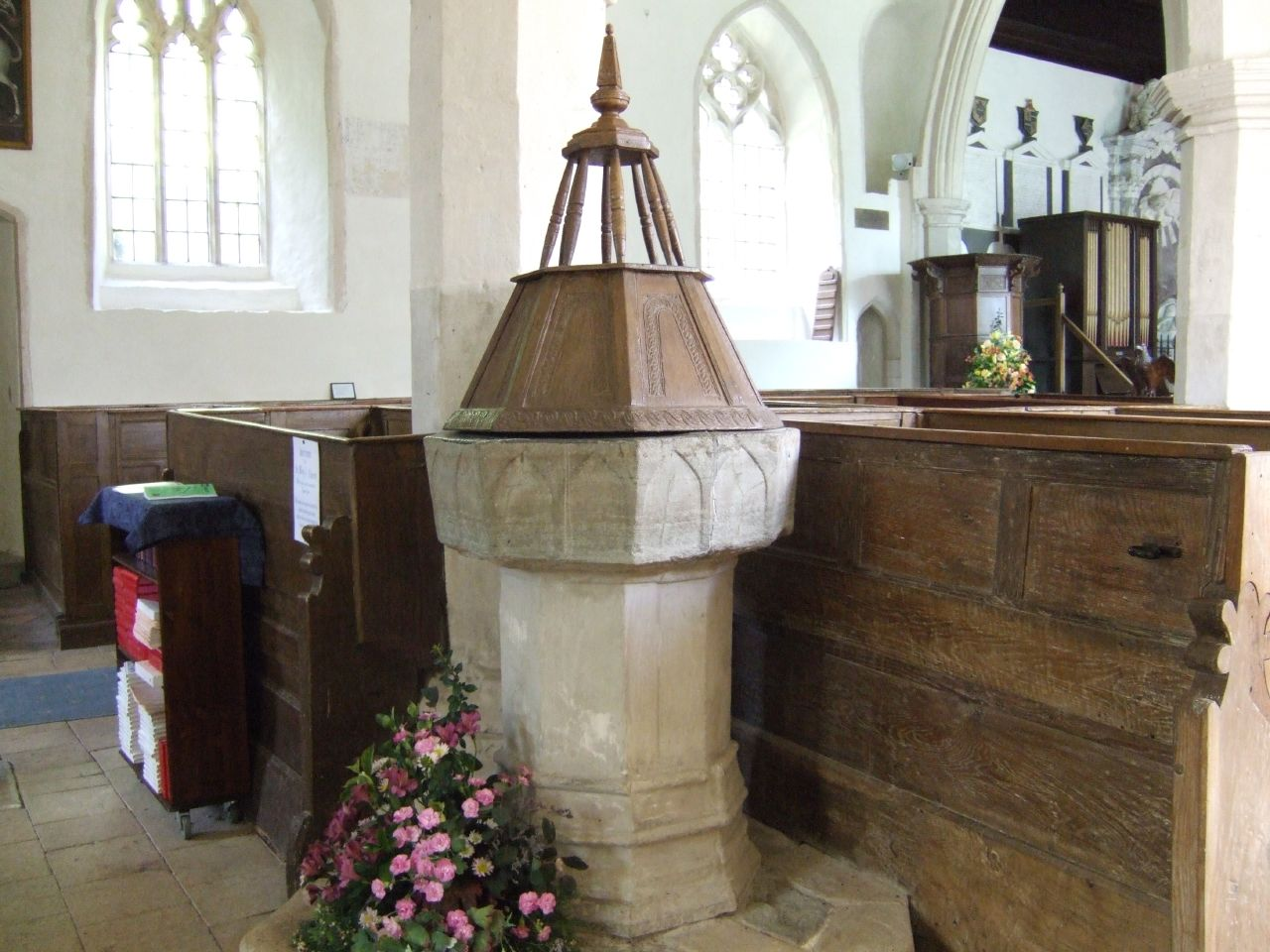

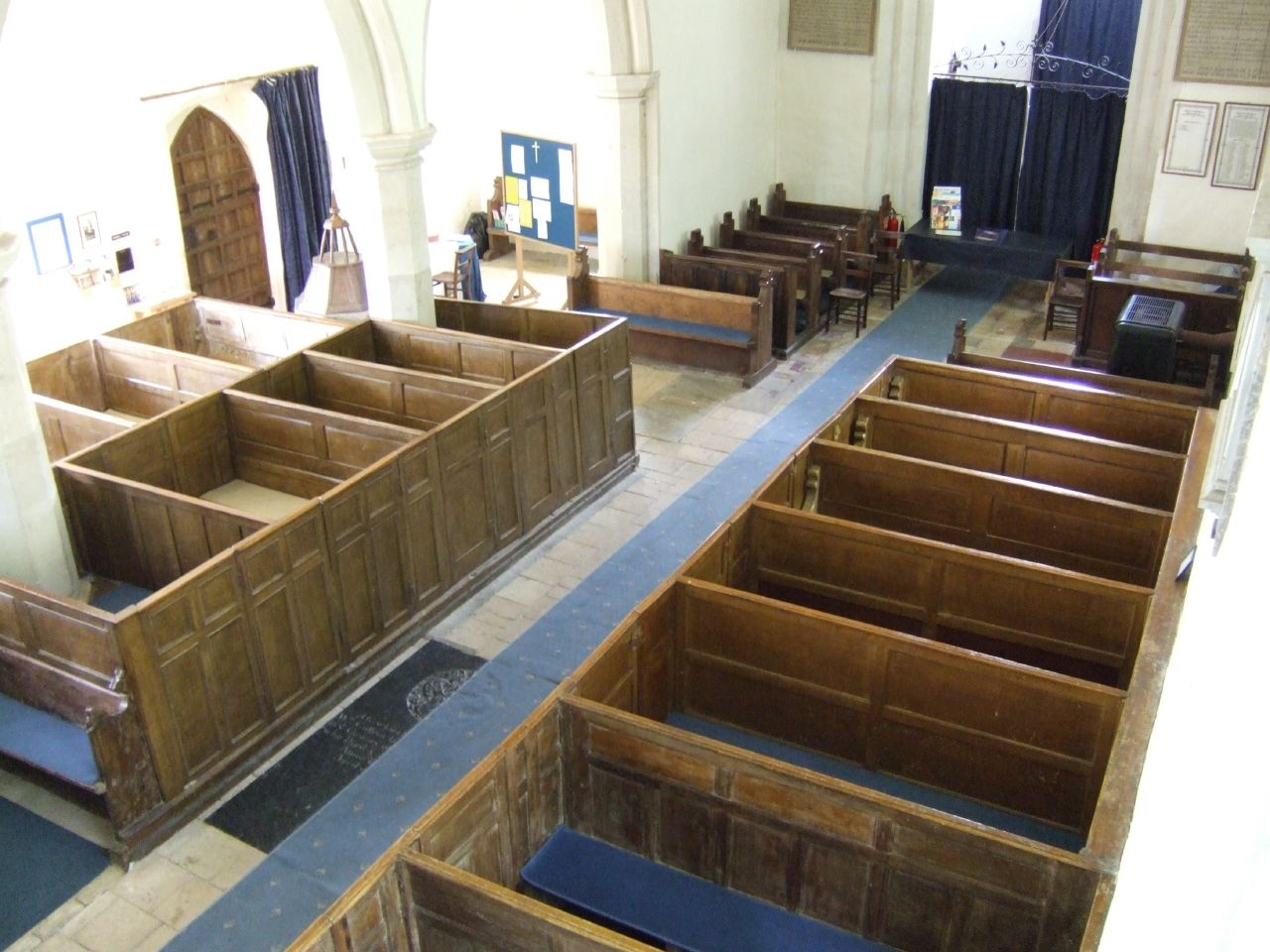

=== 14th-century paintings ===
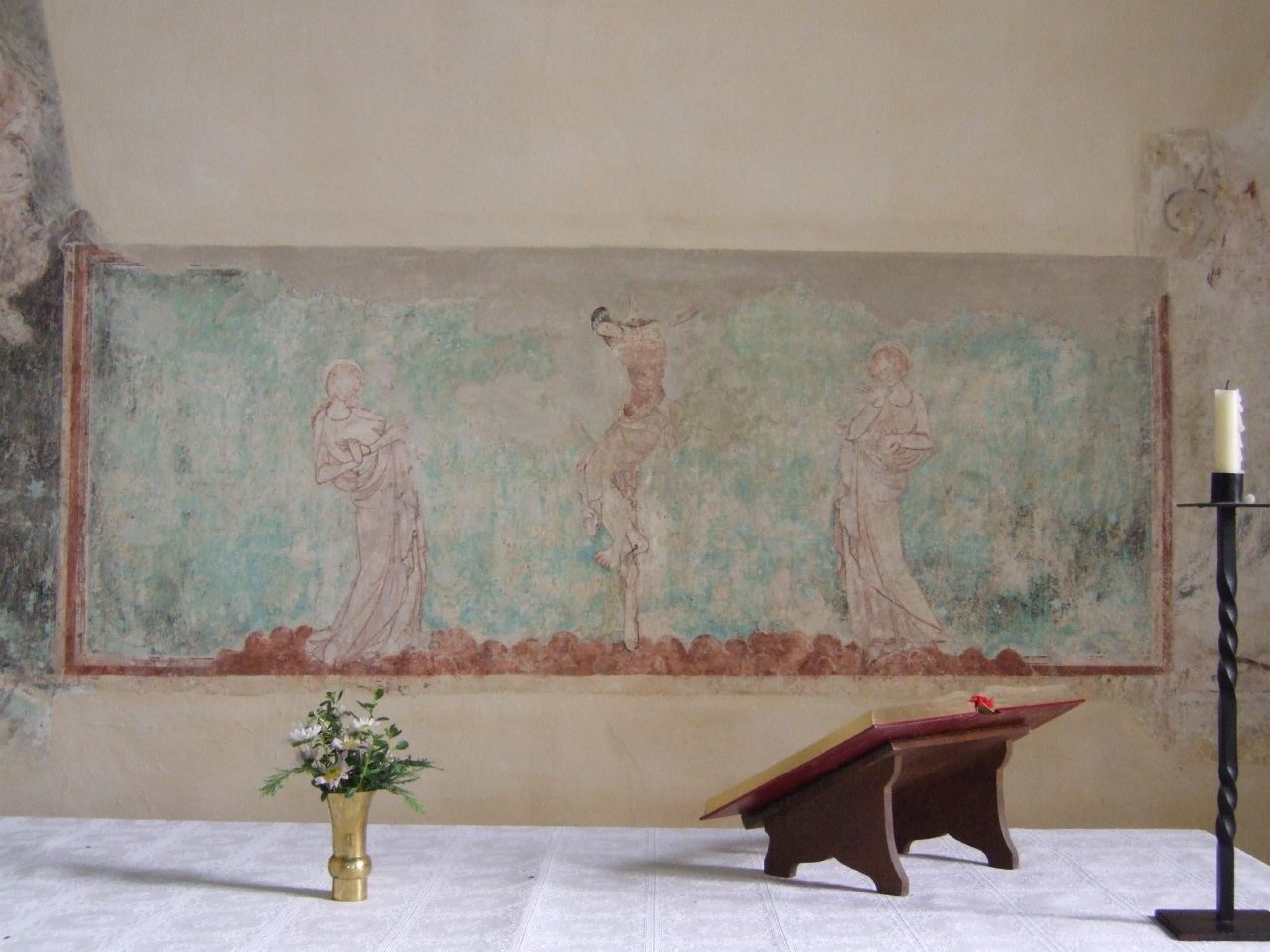

In 1961 a set of three paintings were discovered on the east wall. These had previously been hidden by a Victorian reredos.They have been dated to the 14th century.

=== Edward Colman memorial ===
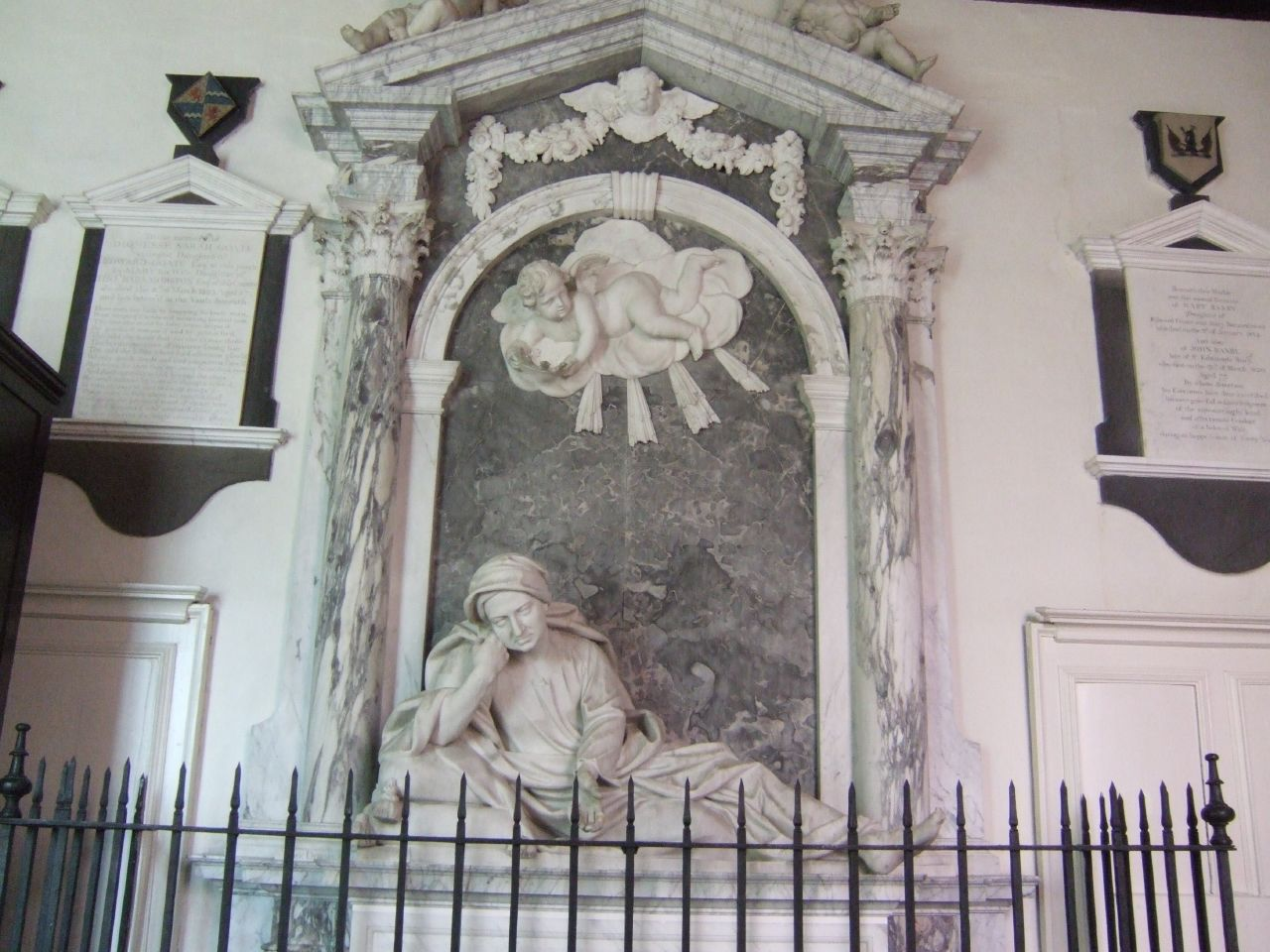

Edward Colman (died 1739) is commemorated in the chancel by a memorial, created by Thomas Dunn.
