= St Peter and St Paul Church, Alpheton =

- St Peter and St Paul Church, Alpheton
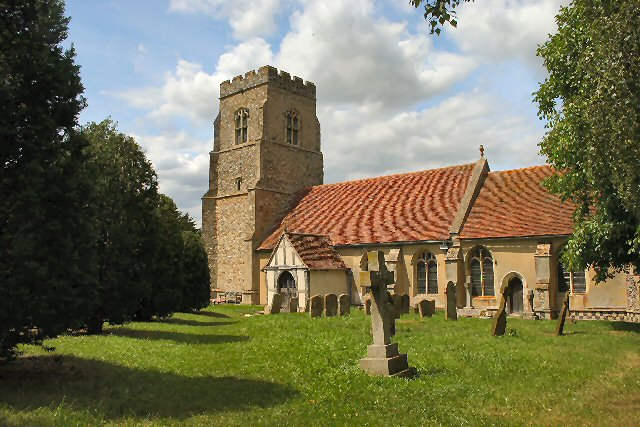
- St Peter and St Paul Church, Alpheton

- Location in Suffolk
- 52°7′14.880″N 0°44′6.407″E
- Location: Alpheton
- Address: Church Lane, Alpheton, Suffolk, CO10 9BL
- Country: England
- Denomination: Church of England

Specifications
- Materials: flint and stone rubble

Administration
- Diocese: St Edmundsbury and Ipswich
- Parish: Alpheton

The St Peter and St Paul Church, Alpheton is the parish church of Alpheton, Suffolk, England. Built in the 14th century it is a Grade I listed building.

The 14th century font is made from Purbeck marble.
