= Abbas Hall =

Grade I listed building in Babergh, United Kingdom

Coordinates: 52°1′46.19″N 0°46′10.84″E

Abbas Hall is a small country house in Great Cornard, a village located near the town of Sudbury, Suffolk in England, the Elizabethan exterior of which masks a medieval two-bay aisled hall of c.1290, from which two massive oak posts with moulded capitals and two arches of the screens passage survive. The inserted floor in the great hall was put in about 1548–49. The house was originally the house of West Malling Abbey's manorial steward here. The house, from the grounds of which Thomas Gainsborough painted his celebrated view of Great Cornard Wood, was restored by the present owner, Stefan Kosciuszko, Chief of Staff Hinduja Group, and chief executive AMAS-IPS, the project development company for the Group, after 1995.

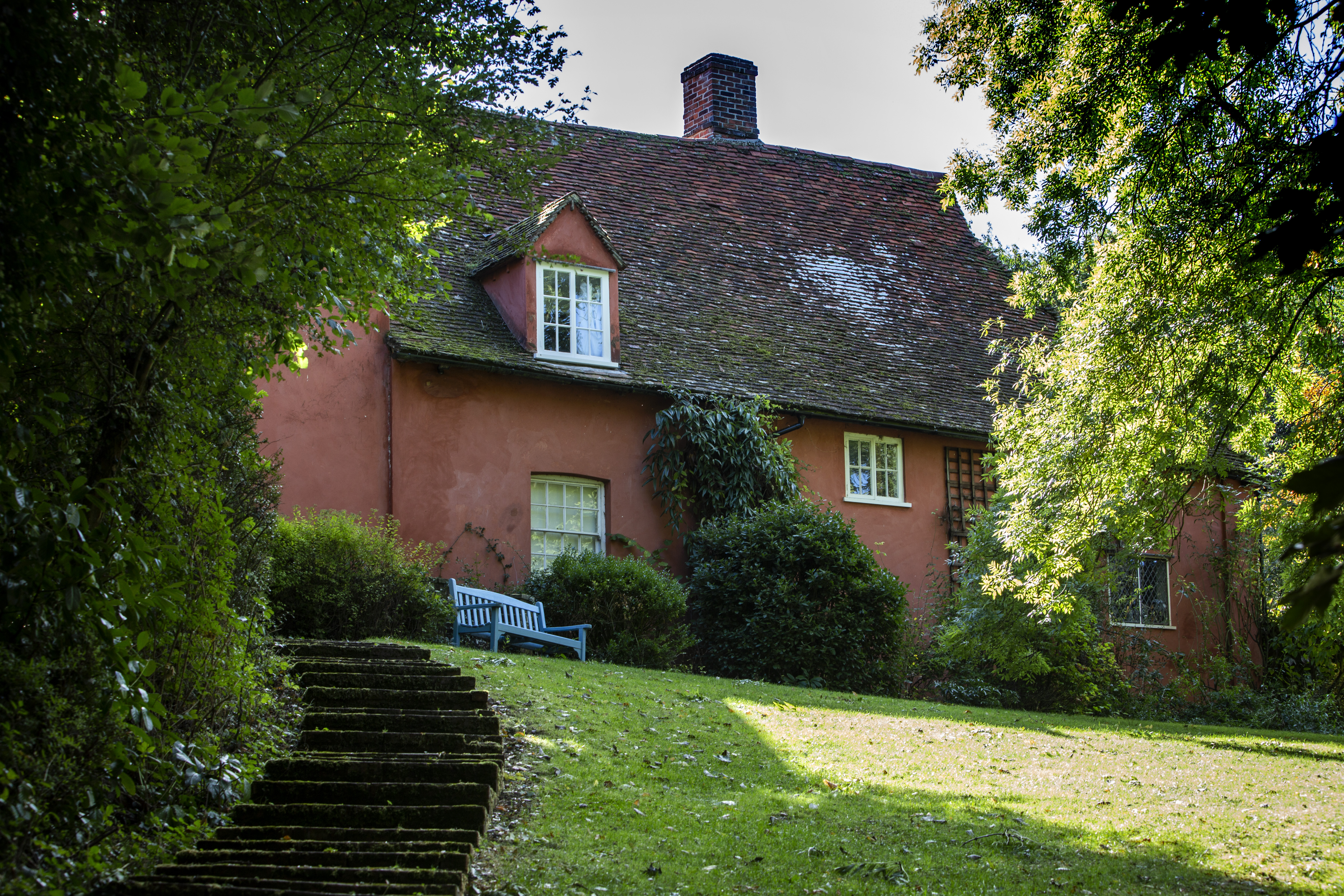
Abbas Hall
