= Flatford Mill =

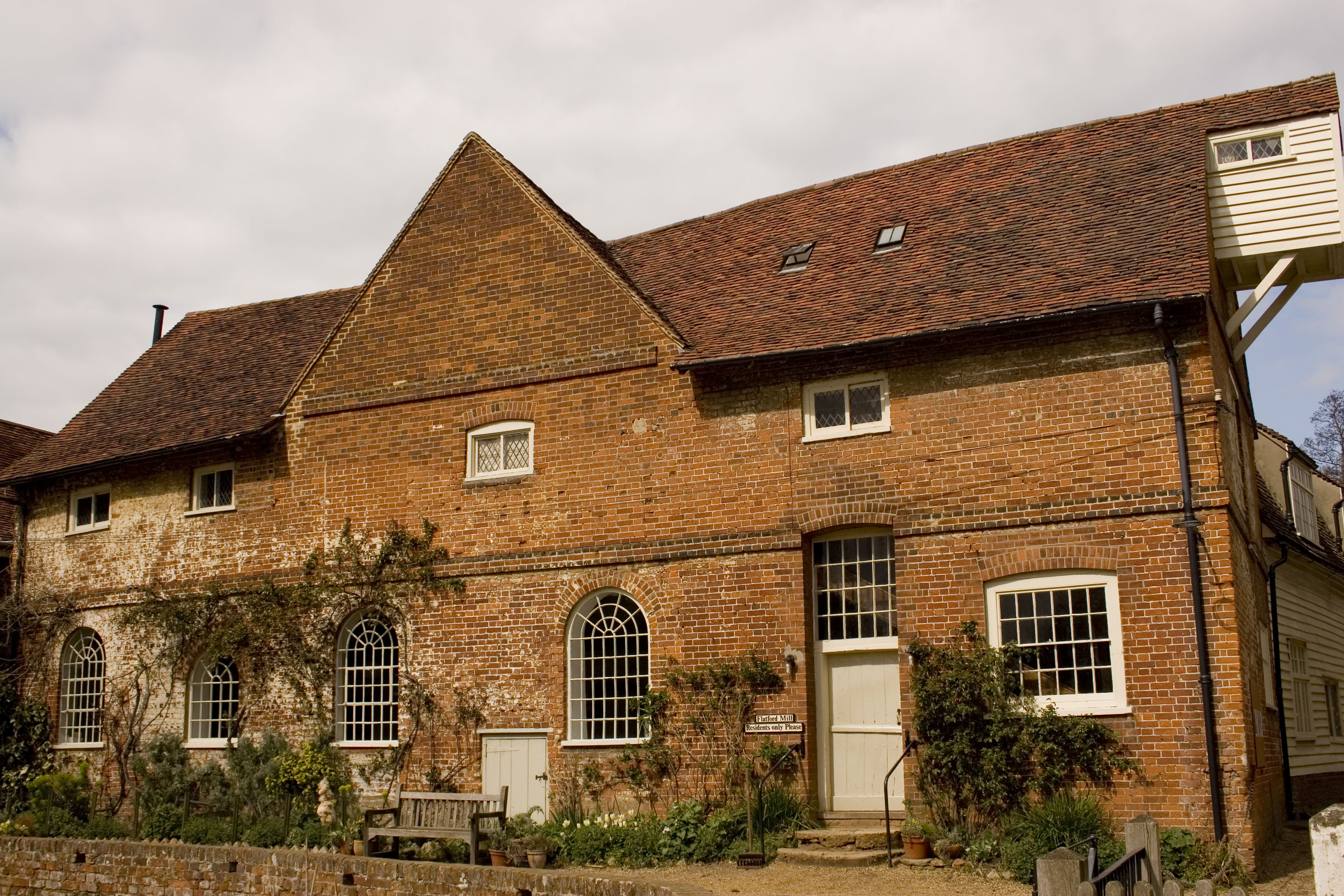
- Flatford Mill
- Interactive map of the Flatford Mill area

General information
- Status: Completed
- Type: Watermill
- Architectural style: Beam
- Location: East Bergholt, United Kingdom
- Coordinates: 51.9588°N 1.0215°E
- Elevation: 3 m (10 ft)
- Current tenants: Field Studies Council
- Completed: 1733
- Owner: National Trust

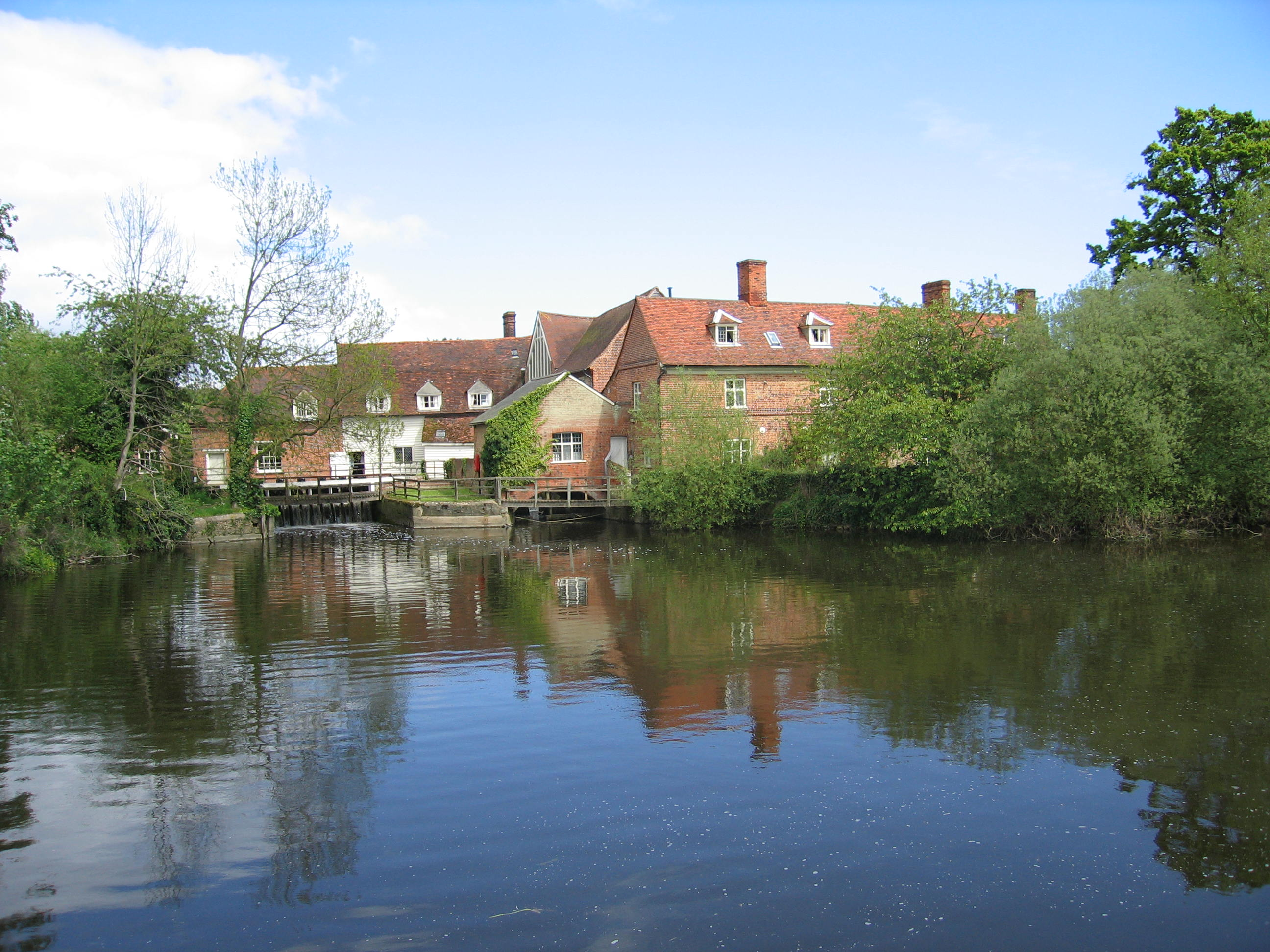
Another view of the mill

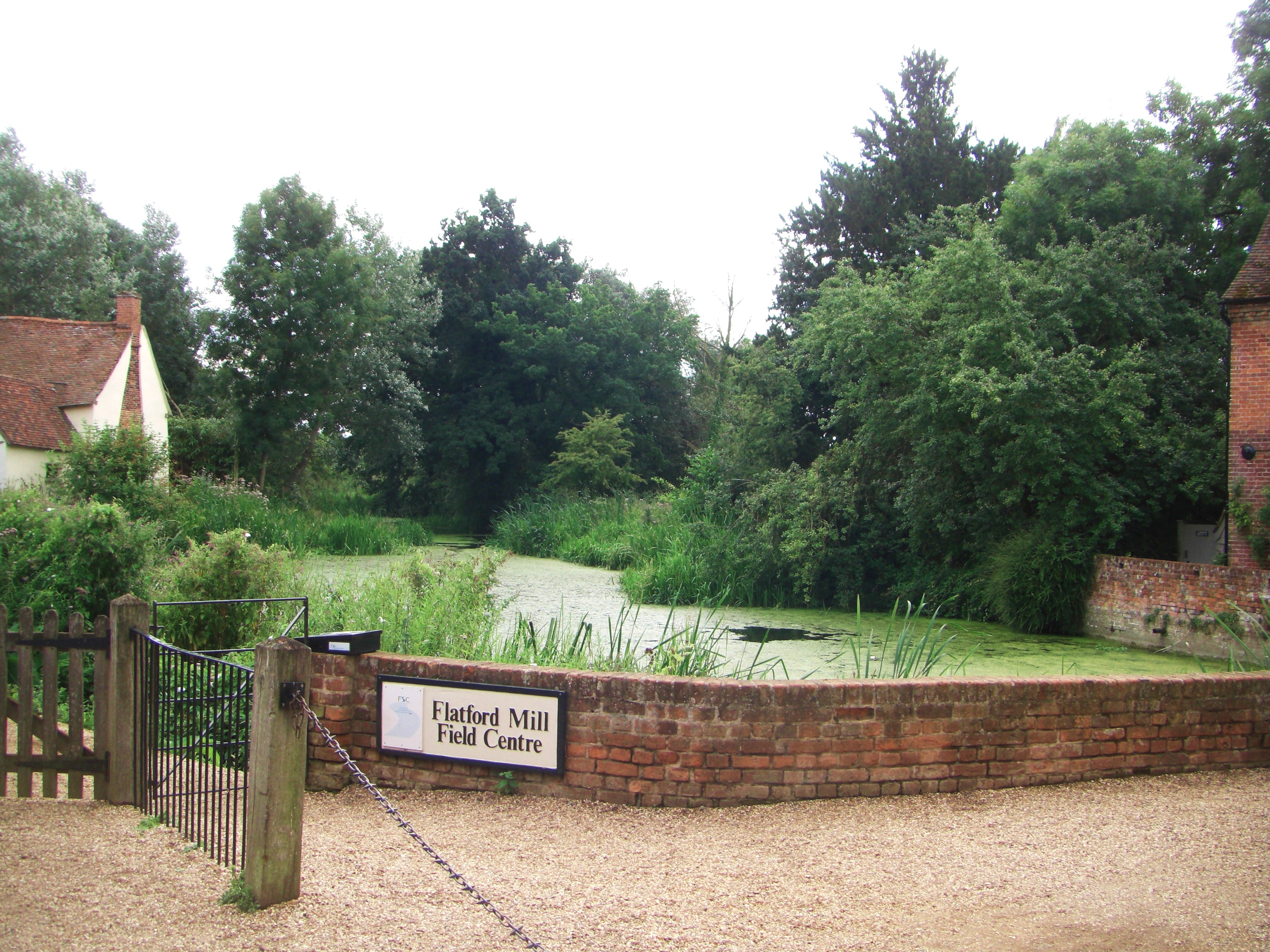
The site where The Hay Wain was painted, as it exists in 2010, where it is primarily a tourist destination.

Flatford Mill is a Grade I listed watermill on the River Stour at Flatford in East Bergholt, Suffolk, England. According to the date-stone the mill was built in 1733, but some of the structure may be earlier. Attached to the mill is a 17th-century miller's cottage which is also Grade I listed. The property is in Dedham Vale, a typically English rural landscape.

The mill was owned by the artist John Constable's father and is noted, along with its immediate surroundings as the location for many of Constable's works. It is referred to in the title of one of his most iconic paintings, Flatford Mill (Scene on a Navigable River), and mentioned in the title or is the subject of several others including: Flatford Mill from a lock on the river Stour; Flatford Mill from the lock (A water mill); The Lock. The Hay Wain, which features Willy Lott's Cottage, was painted from the front of the mill.

== Current use ==
The mill was listed in 1955. It is owned by the National Trust which leases it to the Field Studies Council. who have run it as a field centre since 1943. The National Trust also owns nearby properties, Bridge Cottage, Valley Farm and Willy Lott's Cottage.
