= St Mary's Church, Kersey =

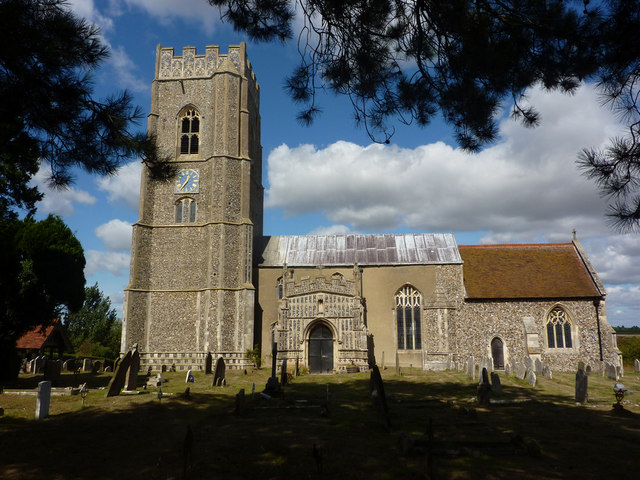
- St Mary's Church, Kersey
- St Mary's Church, Kersey
- 52°3′27.21″N 0°55′9.16″W
- OS grid reference: TM 00207 43946
- Location: Kersey, Suffolk
- Country: England
- Denomination: Church of England

History
- Dedication: St Mary

Architecture
- Heritage designation: Grade I listed

Administration
- Diocese: Diocese of St Edmundsbury and Ipswich
- Archdeaconry: Ipswich
- Deanery: Hadleigh
- Parish: Kersey

St Mary's Church is a Grade I listed parish church in the Church of England in Kersey, Suffolk.

== The Shrine at St Mary's ==
In medieval times St Mary's was an important site of pilgrimage with a shrine filling the whole north aisle. This survived Henry VIII's dissolution programme but was destroyed around the time of the Civil War. On 8 March 2020 the shrine was re-hallowed and more information can be found at www.kerseychurch.org

The newly re-hallowed Shrine and church is host to arts and music events. Jazz evenings take place twice a year, classical music concerts, film evenings, dances and various other events happen regularly. The co-ordinator can be reached at kerseychurch.org/fosm

The Shrine was rehallowed in the presence of Leading Aircraftman Dougie Vince. The bomber on which he served as a flight engineer was attacked by a Messerschmitt Bf 109 as they returned from a raid on western Germany. The navigation instruments were destroyed and a fire started toward the rear of the aircraft. The navigator had no positional fix and fuel was critically low. The RAF, however, had installed two searchlights in the churchyard of St Mary's which illuminated the church tower, giving pilots a known navigational reference point. As a result, the church gained the nickname of the “Thank God Church”. Mr Vince's bomber fixed their position and landed at a nearby airfield. The rear gunner, Mick McGoven, died in the fire and Leading Aircraftman Vince's hand was almost burnt away as he fought the flames using an extinguisher that had become red hot in the flames.

== History ==
The oldest parts of the church date to the twelfth century. A reconstruction of the church is thought to have started with the north aisle which was joined to the nave by an arcade and completed in 1335. Work then started on the tower, but was delayed by the outbreak of the black death in 1349. The tower was completed in 1481 and the north and south porches were then added.

== External and internal architecture ==
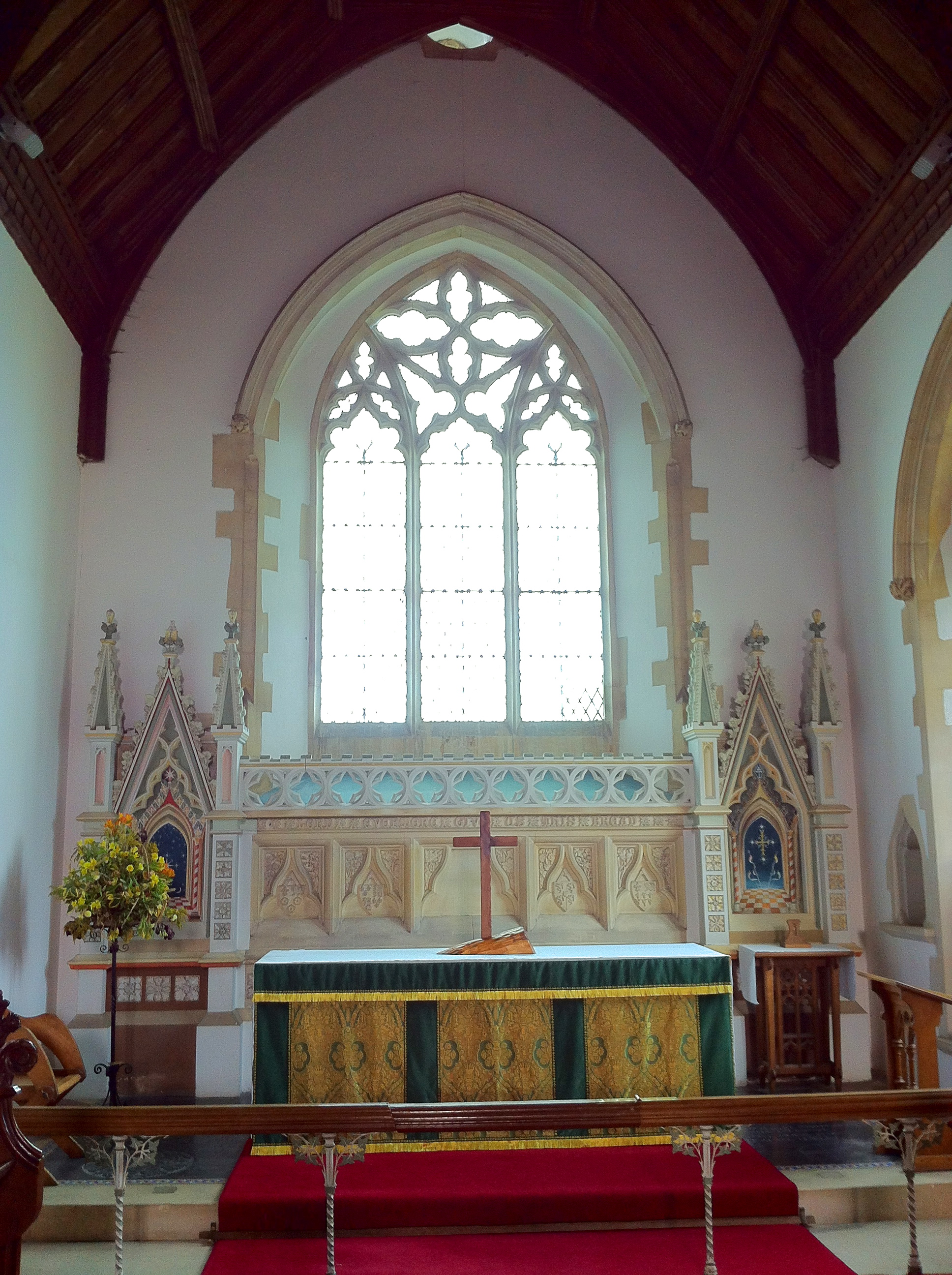
The chancel.

The church is of flint and stone and stands on high ground to the south of the village. In about 1335 the north aisle was built and the tower's foundations laid. The tower was completed in 1481. The tower has four stages. There are diagonal buttresses, a castellated parapet with flint chequerwork and an octagonal stair turret. The south porch has two bays with buttresses rising to crocketted pinnacles. The north porch is similar but less elaborate.

Inside the church, the ceiling has moulded and carved beams and carved panels. The nave roof has hammer beams alternating with tie beams with arched braces meeting in the centre. There are two baptismal fonts, one 12th-century and another 15th-century. There is a 15th-century lectern and chancel screen. The north aisle has a defaced stone carved frieze.

The chancel was rebuilt in 1862 by King's College, Cambridge, and a small vestry was added in the north east corner.

== Internal fittings ==
=== Organ ===
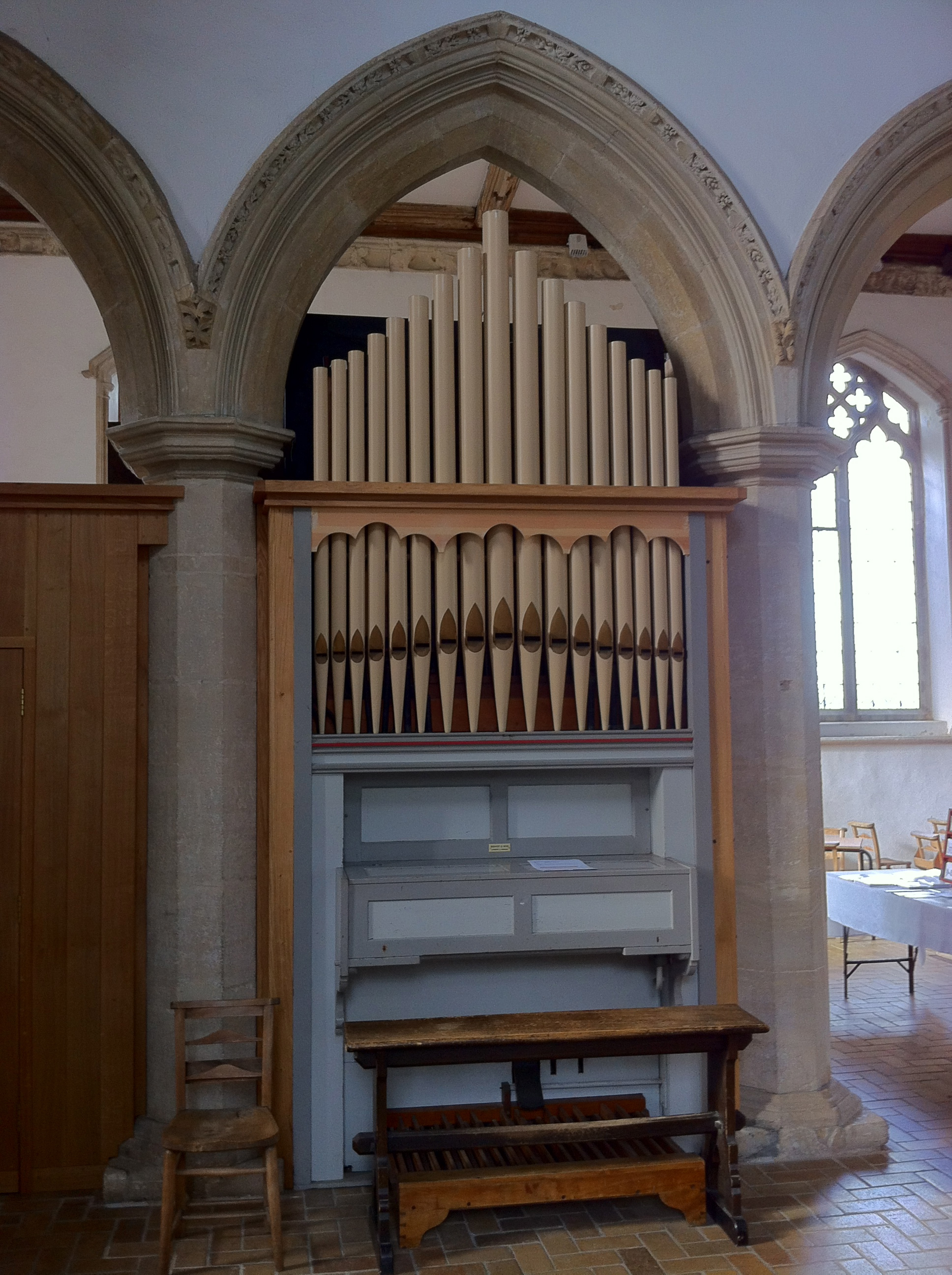
The organ by Bishop & Son in 2013.

The church contains a two manual pipe organ by Bishop & Son of Ipswich and London. A specification of the organ may be found on the National Pipe Organ Register. It was resited in 2012–3 to make room for kitchen and toilet facilities at the west end of the north aisle.

=== Tower ===
The tower is home to a community book crossing, housing over one hundred books. The resource was used extensively during Covid times and is much loved by the community. Weddings and funerals enter through the 15th century West doors, noting the curiously off-set tower, nave and chancel. The tower contains eight bells.

=== Rood screen ===
The church is noted for retaining a small section of its medieval rood screen. It was recovered from a local farm and restored. The panels show saints and kings, one of the Kings being Edmund the Martyr, shown holding an arrow.

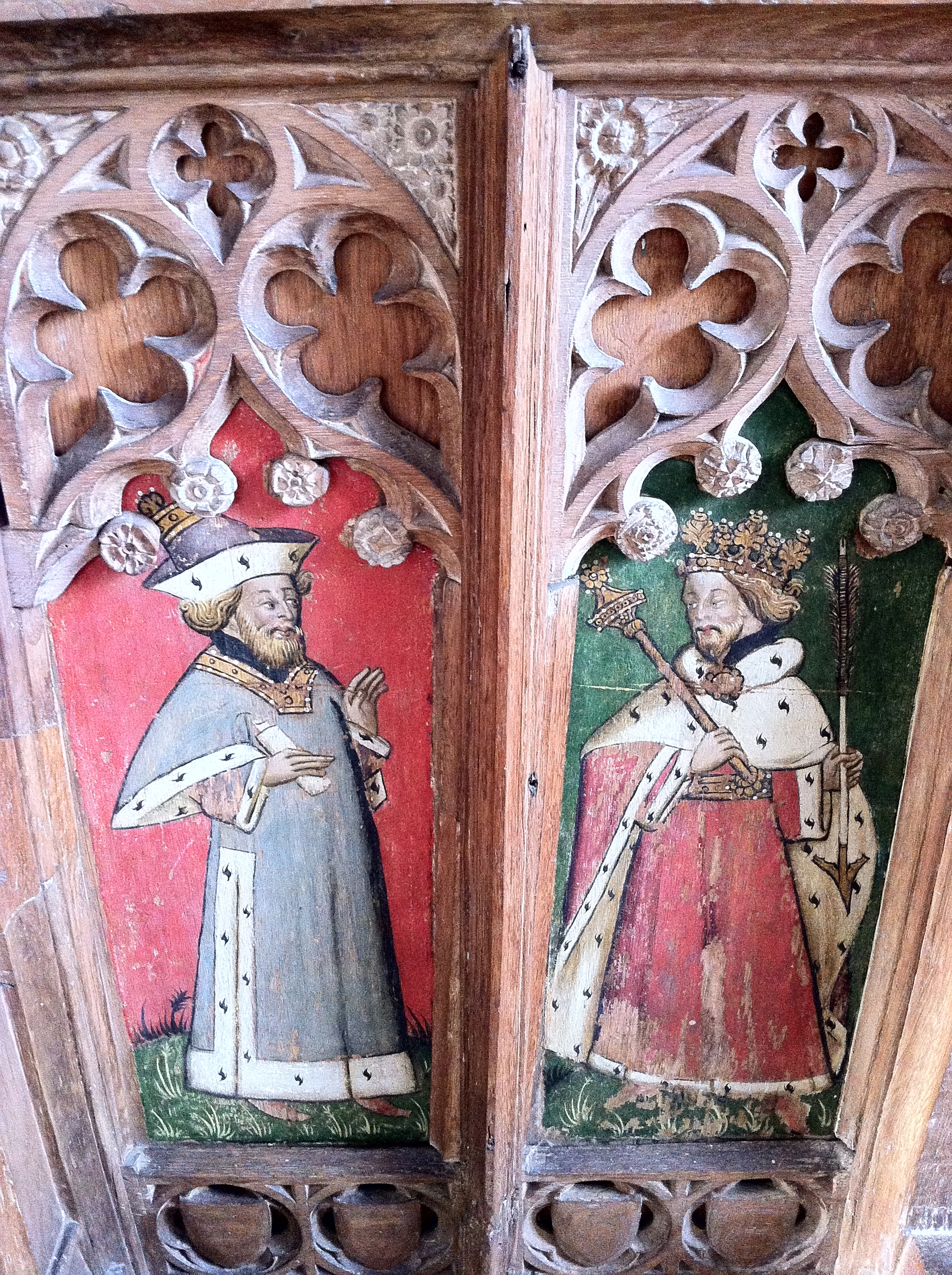

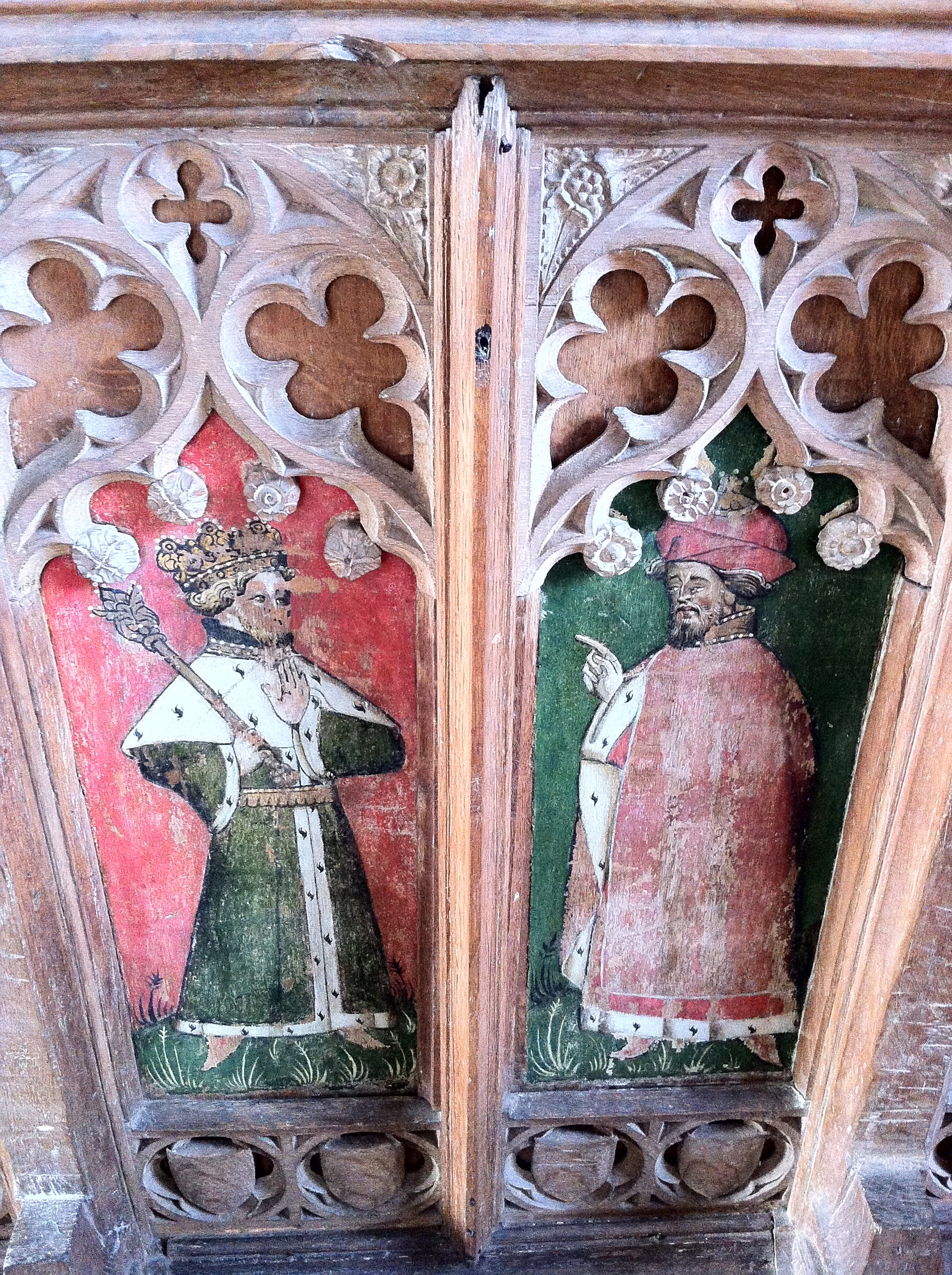

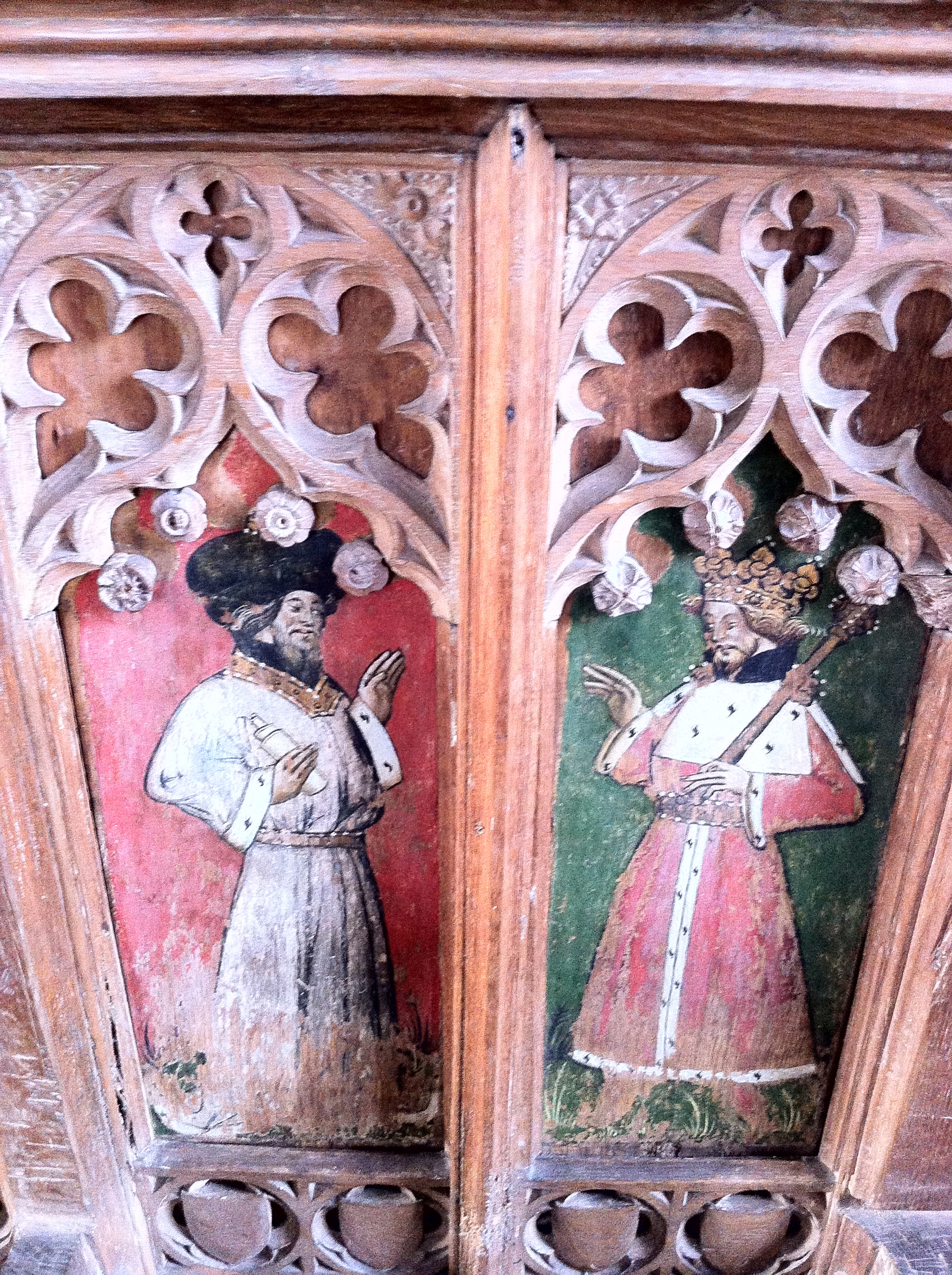

== Parish status ==
The church is part of a benefice which includes four other parishes:

- St Mary's Church, Aldham
- St Peter's Church, Elmsett
- St Nicholas' Church, Hintlesham
- All Saints and St Margaret's Church, Chattisham

== Clergy ==
- Thomas Clarke 158
- Robert Gumyill 1607 - 1613
- Thomas Miller 1635
- John Sloper 1638 - 1644
- John Burgess 1644 - 1646
- William Alcocke 1647 - 1653
- Nathaniel Snow 1654 - 1666
- Thomas Horne 1670 - 1683
- George Wroth 1683 - 1686
- George Williams 1686 - 1689
- Gregory Doughty 1689 - 1724
- Charles Thackham 1724 - 1725
- Everard Sturgis 1725
- John Lane ???? - 1740
- Nathaniel Kent 1740 - 1766
- John Howes 1766 - 1773
- Henry Ingles 1773 - 1774
- Alexander Akehurst 1775 - 1777
- James Chatres 1777 - 1778
- John Gee Smith 1782 - 1785
- William Cole 1785 - 1787
- William Moore 1787 - 1789
- Thomas Barrow 1789 - 1801
- Thomas Hart during 1797
- Joshua Hird 1801 - 1803
- Joah Furey 1803 - 1807
- Sterling Kelty 1807 - 1810
- Stephen Hurnard Hawtrey 1810 - 1812
- Sterling Kelty 1812 - 1817
- Alfred James Trash 1817 - 1823
- Charles Hatch 1823 - 1836
- Charles Chapman 1836 - 1849
- Abraham Humie 1849 - 1878
- Cecil Gordon Moore 1878
- Alford Dean Mozeley 1878
- William Brice Gray 1879 - 1907
- Alford Dean Mozeley 1878
- William Brice Gray 1879 - 1907
- Frank Benet Phillips 1907 - 1915
- Thomas Harding Soulby 1915 - 1922
- Daniel Kent Ambrose 1922 - 1936
- Roger Ernest Tempest 1936 - 1942
- William Walter Lillie 1942 - 1947
- William Hugh Nottage Mumford 1947 - 1955
- Sydney Edward Caller 1955 - 1961
- Howard Donald Lewis Thomas 1961 - 1967
- Christopher R. W. Goddard 1968 - 1973
- Henry Tait 1974 - 1975
- Albert Richard Johnstone 1975 - 1980
- Gerald Harrison 1981 - 1988
- William James Sands 1989 - 1922
- Ian A Wilson 1993 - 2002
- Janet M Simpson 2003
- Trisha & Tim Ffrench 2007
- Jackson Crompton-Battersby 2018
