= Flatford =

Hamlet in Suffolk, England

Coordinates: 51.95945°N 1.01866°E

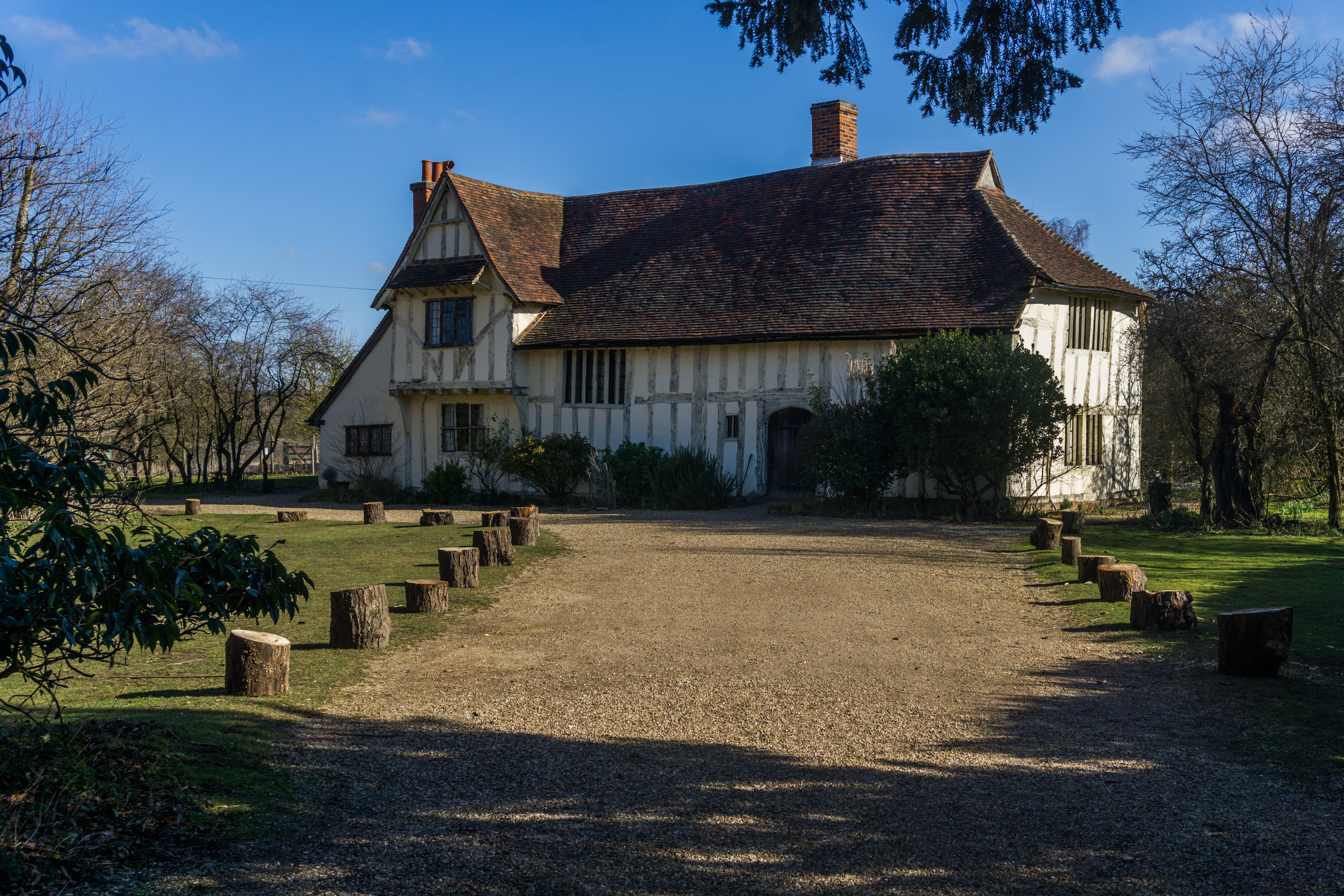
- Valley Farm - Oldest building of Flatford

- Location within Suffolk
- OS grid reference: TM075333
- Civil parish: East Bergholt
- District: Babergh
- Shire county: Suffolk
- Region: East
- Country: England
- Sovereign state: United Kingdom
- Post town: COLCHESTER
- Postcode district: CO7
- Dialling code: 01206
- Police: Suffolk
- Fire: Suffolk
- Ambulance: East of England
- UK Parliament: South Suffolk

Flatford is a small hamlet in the civil parish of East Bergholt, in the Babergh district, in the county of Suffolk, England. It is most famous for Flatford Mill, Willy Lott's Cottage and Bridge Cottage, immortalised in the paintings of John Constable.

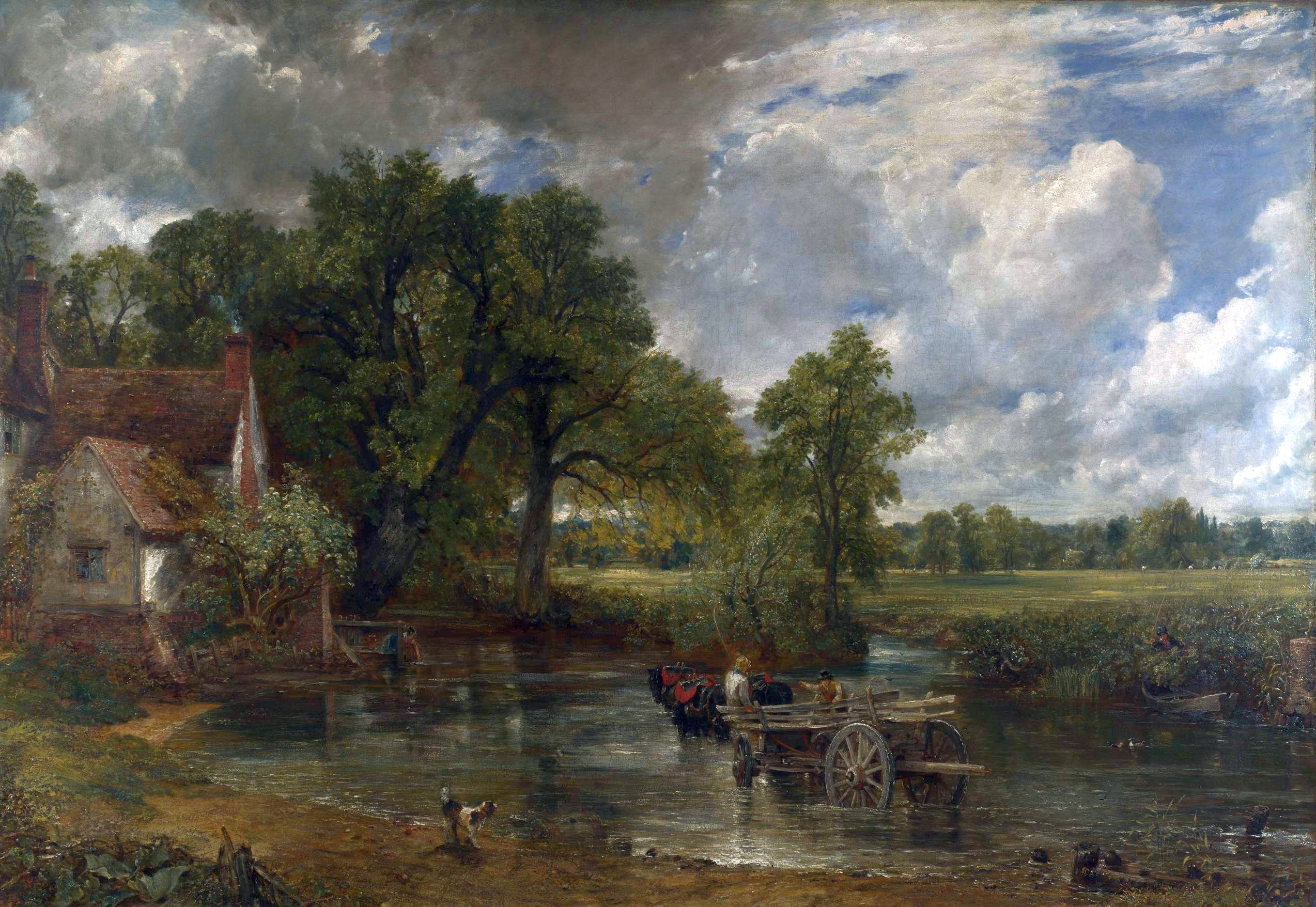
The Haywain - showing Willy Lott's Cottage - possibly John Constable's most famous image.

== Access ==
Flatford is accessible by road from East Bergholt, with a limited access route looping down to the main Flatford car park. The route is a two way road at the top section, allowing access to the properties there. From the car park onwards though the route is one way, back into East Bergholt, emerging near the village War Memorial and the church. The hamlet can also be accessed on foot from Manningtree and Dedham, Essex. Flatford is approximately 1.5 miles (2.4 km) from Manningtree railway station, to which it is linked by an off-road footpath.
