= Great Cornard =

Village in Suffolk, England

Coordinates: 52.02453°N 0.74966°E

Cornard
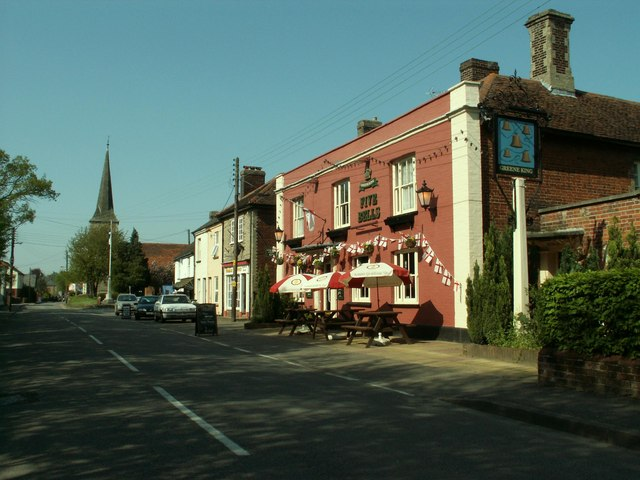
- 'Five Bells' inn, Great Cornard

- Location within Suffolk
- Population: 8,908 (2011)
- OS grid reference: TL887398
- District: Babergh
- Shire county: Suffolk
- Region: East
- Country: England
- Sovereign state: United Kingdom
- Post town: SUDBURY
- Postcode district: CO10
- Dialling code: 01787
- Police: Suffolk
- Fire: Suffolk
- Ambulance: East of England
- UK Parliament: South Suffolk

Great Cornard is a large village and civil parish that is part of the town of Sudbury, in the Babergh district, in the county of Suffolk, England.

== History ==
The area now called Great Cornard has been occupied since pre-history, with evidence of Palaeolithic, Bronze Age and Roman settlements in the parish. The village is accounted for in the Domesday Book of 1086 as the manor of Cornard. A small undated ringwork, located to the south of Abbas Hall, may have been a manorial centre pre-Norman conquest. Alternatively, it may have been a post-conquest manor or ringwork castle.

The village was consistently a small one until the 20th century. Following the turn of the century the population steadily increased and a council estate was built in the 1960s. In the 1950s and 60s the village was greatly expanded following the County of London Plan, with the village taking in London overspill. By the beginning of the 21st century the population of Great Cornard was approaching that of the town of Sudbury.

== Sport and leisure ==
Great Cornard has two Non-League football clubs, Cornard United and Kings Park Rangers, both of whom play at Blackhouse Lane. The village is also the homes of the hockey and rugby union teams for neighbouring Sudbury, also the home of the Sudbury Motor Cycle Club track at Tye Farm.

On the outskirts of the village lies Cornard Country Park, a nature reserve containing wild flower meadows and woodland.

== Education ==
Secondary education is provided by Thomas Gainsborough School, which also houses the village's sports centre, library and theatre. Primary schools include Wells Hall Primary School and Pot Kiln Primary School.

== Notable residents ==
Former Arsenal footballer, Perry Groves grew up in Great Cornard, playing for youth team Cornard Dynamos Football Club as a boy.

== See also ==
- Little Cornard

== Sources ==
- The Great Cornard Information Website - Cornard History
