= Listed buildings in Babergh District =

There are around 3,000 listed buildings in the Babergh District, Suffolk, which are buildings of architectural or historic interest.

- Grade I buildings are of exceptional interest.
- Grade II* buildings are particularly important buildings of more than special interest.
- Grade II buildings are of special interest.

The lists follow Historic England’s geographical organisation, with entries grouped by county, local authority, and parish (civil and non-civil). The following lists are arranged by parish.

Parish	List of listed buildings	Grade I	Grade II*	Grade II	Total
Acton	Listed buildings in Acton, Suffolk	1		18	19
Aldham	Listed buildings in Aldham, Suffolk	1		5	6
Alpheton	Listed buildings in Alpheton				
Arwarton	Listed buildings in Arwarton				
Assington	Listed buildings in Assington				
Belstead	Listed buildings in Belstead				
Bentley	Listed buildings in Bentley, Suffolk				
Bildeston	Listed buildings in Bildeston				
Boxford	Listed buildings in Boxford, Suffolk				
Boxted	Listed buildings in Boxted, Suffolk				
Brantham	Listed buildings in Brantham				
Brent Eleigh	Listed buildings in Brent Eleigh				
Brettenham	Listed buildings in Brettenham, Suffolk				
Bures St Mary	Listed buildings in Bures St. Mary				
Burstall	Listed buildings in Burstall, Suffolk				
Capel St Mary	Listed buildings in Capel St Mary				
Chattisham	Listed buildings in Chattisham				
Chelmondiston	Listed buildings in Chelmondiston				
Chelsworth	Listed buildings in Chelsworth				
Chilton	Listed buildings in Chilton, Suffolk				
Cockfield	Listed buildings in Cockfield, Suffolk				
Copdock and Washbrook	Listed buildings in Copdock and Washbrook				
East Bergholt	Listed buildings in East Bergholt				
Edwardstone	Listed buildings in Edwardstone				
Elmsett	Listed buildings in Elmsett				
Freston	Listed buildings in Freston, Suffolk				
Glemsford	Listed buildings in Glemsford				
Great Cornard	Listed buildings in Great Cornard				
Great Waldingfield	Listed buildings in Great Waldingfield				
Groton	Listed buildings in Groton, Suffolk				
Hadleigh	Listed buildings in Hadleigh, Suffolk				
Harkstead	Listed buildings in Harkstead				
Hartest	Listed buildings in Hartest				
Higham	Listed buildings in Higham, Babergh				
Hintlesham	Listed buildings in Hintlesham				
Hitcham	Listed buildings in Hitcham, Suffolk				
Holbrook	Listed buildings in Holbrook, Suffolk				
Holton St Mary	Listed buildings in Holton St Mary				
Kersey	Listed buildings in Kersey, Suffolk				
Kettlebaston	Listed buildings in Kettlebaston				
Lavenham	Listed buildings in Lavenham				
Lawshall	Listed buildings in Lawshall				
Layham	Listed buildings in Layham				
Leavenheath	Listed buildings in Leavenheath				
Lindsey	Listed buildings in Lindsey, Suffolk				
Little Cornard	Listed buildings in Little Cornard				
Little Waldingfield	Listed buildings in Little Waldingfield				
Long Melford	Listed buildings in Long Melford				
Milden	Listed buildings in Milden, Suffolk				
Monks Eleigh	Listed buildings in Monks Eleigh				
Nayland-with-Wissington	Listed buildings in Nayland-with-Wissington				
Nedging-with-Naughton	Listed buildings in Nedging-with-Naughton				
Newton	Listed buildings in Newton, Suffolk				
Pinewood	Listed buildings in Pinewood, Suffolk				
Polstead	Listed buildings in Polstead				
Preston St Mary	Listed buildings in Preston St Mary				
Raydon	Listed buildings in Raydon				
Semer	Listed buildings in Semer, Suffolk				
Shelley	Listed buildings in Shelley, Suffolk				
Shimpling	Listed buildings in Shimpling				
Shotley	Listed buildings in Shotley, Suffolk				
Somerton	Listed buildings in Somerton, Suffolk				
Sproughton	Listed buildings in Sproughton				
Stanstead	Listed buildings in Stanstead, Suffolk				
Stoke-by-Nayland	Listed buildings in Stoke-by-Nayland				
Stratford St Mary	Listed buildings in Stratford St Mary				
Stutton	Listed buildings in Stutton, Suffolk				
Sudbury	Listed buildings in Sudbury, Suffolk				
Tattingstone	Listed buildings in Tattingstone				
Thorpe Morieux	Listed buildings in Thorpe Morieux				
Wattisham	Listed buildings in Wattisham				
Wenham Magna	Listed buildings in Wenham Magna				
Wenham Parva	Listed buildings in Wenham Parva				
Whatfield	Listed buildings in Whatfield				
Wherstead	Listed buildings in Wherstead				
Woolverstone	Listed buildings in Woolverstone				

== See also ==
- Grade I listed buildings in Suffolk
- Grade II* listed buildings in Suffolk

== Sources ==
- Bettely, James; Pevsner, Nikolaus (2015) [1961], Suffolk: West, The Buildings of England, New Haven and London: Yale University Press, ISBN 978-0-300-19655-9
