= Listed buildings in Sudbury, Suffolk =

Civil Parish in Suffolk, England

Sudbury is a town and civil parish in the Babergh District of Suffolk, England. It contains 239 listed buildings that are recorded in the National Heritage List for England. Of these six grade I, ten are grade II* and 223 are grade II.

This list is based on the information retrieved online from Historic England.

== Key ==
Grade	Criteria
I	Buildings that are of exceptional interest
II*	Particularly important buildings of more than special interest
II	Buildings that are of special interest

== Listing ==
Name	Grade	Location	Type	Completed (Note: The date given is the date used by Historic England as significant for the initial building or that of an important part in the structure's description.)	Date designated	Grid ref. (Note: The grid reference is based on the British national grid reference system, sometimes known as OSGB36, used by the Ordnance Survey.) Geo-coordinates	Notes	Entry number (Note: The "List Entry Number" is a unique number assigned to each listed building and scheduled monument by Historic England.)	Image	Wikidata
2 Friar's Street and 40 Market Hill	II	2 Friar's Street And 40 Market Hill, CO10 2AA	building		26 October 1971	TL8730241225; 52°02′16″N 0°43′46″E		1180424	2 Friar's Street and 40 Market Hill More images	Q26475657
62a-64 Friars Street, Sudbury	II	62a - 64 Friars Street, CO10 2AG			26 October 1971	TL8709041065; 52°02′11″N 0°43′34″E		1037510	Upload Photo	Q26289232
Ballingdon Grove	II				26 October 1971	TL8690140371; 52°01′49″N 0°43′23″E		1351355	Upload Photo	Q26634465
Ballingdon Hall	II*				3 March 1952	TL8626740189; 52°01′44″N 0°42′50″E		1037550	Upload Photo	Q17533596
Church of St Gregory	I		church building		3 March 1952	TL8705441486; 52°02′25″N 0°43′33″E		1037548	Church of St Gregory More images	Q17542064
Churchyard Walls	II				26 October 1971	TL8704841549; 52°02′27″N 0°43′33″E		1037549	Upload Photo	Q26289269
Sudbury Quaker Meeting House	II	CO10 2AA			26 October 1971	TL8731441131; 52°02′13″N 0°43′46″E		1037493	Upload Photo	Q26289214
1-6, Ballingdon Street	II	1-6, Ballingdon Street			3 March 1952	TL8673040883; 52°02′06″N 0°43′15″E		1037551	Upload Photo	Q26289270
10-13, Ballingdon Street	II	10-13, Ballingdon Street			26 October 1971	TL8662040833; 52°02′04″N 0°43′09″E		1351356	Upload Photo	Q26634466
14 and 15, Ballingdon Street	II	14 and 15, Ballingdon Street			26 October 1971	TL8658640826; 52°02′04″N 0°43′08″E		1037552	Upload Photo	Q26289271
Blue Boar	II	16, Ballingdon Street			26 October 1971	TL8657240820; 52°02′04″N 0°43′07″E		1194702	Upload Photo	Q26489316
17 and 18, Ballingdon Street	II	17 and 18, Ballingdon Street			26 October 1971	TL8655840815; 52°02′04″N 0°43′06″E		1351357	Upload Photo	Q26634467
19 and 20, Ballingdon Street	II	19 and 20, Ballingdon Street			9 November 1999	TL8655040811; 52°02′04″N 0°43′06″E		1379433	Upload Photo	Q26659683
23, Ballingdon Street	II	23, Ballingdon Street			26 October 1971	TL8652140798; 52°02′03″N 0°43′04″E		1037553	Upload Photo	Q26289272
50, Ballingdon Street	II	50, Ballingdon Street			26 October 1971	TL8642340707; 52°02′00″N 0°42′59″E		1194713	Upload Photo	Q26489327
West House	II	60 and 61, Ballingdon Street			26 October 1971	TL8641240738; 52°02′01″N 0°42′58″E		1037554	Upload Photo	Q26289273
62, Ballingdon Street	II	62, Ballingdon Street			26 October 1971	TL8642240745; 52°02′02″N 0°42′59″E		1285564	Upload Photo	Q26574247
63, Ballingdon Street	II	63, Ballingdon Street			26 October 1971	TL8642740749; 52°02′02″N 0°42′59″E		1351358	Upload Photo	Q26634468
64, Ballingdon Street	II	64, Ballingdon Street			26 October 1971	TL8643940758; 52°02′02″N 0°43′00″E		1037555	Upload Photo	Q26289274
74, Ballingdon Street	II	74, Ballingdon Street			26 October 1971	TL8647040788; 52°02′03″N 0°43′01″E		1194736	Upload Photo	Q26489349
75-77, Ballingdon Street	II	75-77, Ballingdon Street			26 October 1971	TL8647440791; 52°02′03″N 0°43′02″E		1351359	Upload Photo	Q26634469
78, Ballingdon Street	II	78, Ballingdon Street			26 October 1971	TL8648840804; 52°02′03″N 0°43′02″E		1194742	Upload Photo	Q26489355
79, Ballingdon Street	II	79, Ballingdon Street			26 October 1971	TL8649540810; 52°02′04″N 0°43′03″E		1037556	Upload Photo	Q26289275
80-83, Ballingdon Street	II	80-83, Ballingdon Street			26 October 1971	TL8650440815; 52°02′04″N 0°43′03″E		1037557	Upload Photo	Q26289276
St Bernard	II	85, Ballingdon Street			26 October 1971	TL8652040829; 52°02′04″N 0°43′04″E		1285541	Upload Photo	Q26574228
86-88, Ballingdon Street	II	86-88, Ballingdon Street			26 October 1971	TL8652940833; 52°02′04″N 0°43′05″E		1351320	Upload Photo	Q26634434
89, Ballingdon Street	II	89, Ballingdon Street			26 October 1971	TL8654740843; 52°02′05″N 0°43′06″E		1037513	Upload Photo	Q26289236
90, Ballingdon Street	II	90, Ballingdon Street			26 October 1971	TL8655440845; 52°02′05″N 0°43′06″E		1037514	Upload Photo	Q26289237
91 and 92, Ballingdon Street	II	91 and 92, Ballingdon Street			26 October 1971	TL8655940846; 52°02′05″N 0°43′06″E		1351379	Upload Photo	Q26634490
93, Ballingdon Street	II	93, Ballingdon Street			26 October 1971	TL8657440856; 52°02′05″N 0°43′07″E		1037515	Upload Photo	Q26289238
St Mary's	II	98, Ballingdon Street			26 October 1971	TL8666840876; 52°02′06″N 0°43′12″E		1351340	Upload Photo	Q26685429
99-102, Ballingdon Street	II	99-102, Ballingdon Street			26 October 1971	TL8670240891; 52°02′06″N 0°43′14″E		1037516	Upload Photo	Q26289239
Bridge House	II	Ballingdon Street			3 March 1952	TL8670340867; 52°02′05″N 0°43′14″E		1285591	Upload Photo	Q26574273
Brundon Hall Cottages	II	1-3, Brundon			3 March 1952	TL8647142226; 52°02′49″N 0°43′04″E		1351341	Upload Photo	Q26634453
Brundon Hall	II*	Brundon			3 March 1952	TL8657242180; 52°02′48″N 0°43′09″E		1037518	Upload Photo	Q17533558
Brundon Mill	II	Brundon	watermill		3 March 1952	TL8645142264; 52°02′51″N 0°43′03″E		1037517	Brundon Mill More images	Q26289240
Gazebo in Garden of the Red House	II	Bullocks Lane			26 October 1971	TL8733041036; 52°02′10″N 0°43′47″E		1351343	Upload Photo	Q26634454
Serpentine Walls of Garden of the Red House	II	Bullocks Lane			26 October 1971	TL8735841094; 52°02′12″N 0°43′49″E		1037519	Upload Photo	Q26289241
The Red House	II*	Bullocks Lane			3 March 1952	TL8731741071; 52°02′11″N 0°43′46″E		1351342	Upload Photo	Q17534318
The King's Head Public House	II	Bulmer Road			26 October 1971	TL8638540693; 52°02′00″N 0°42′57″E		1037520	Upload Photo	Q26289242
The Transport Cafe	II	Bulmer Road			26 October 1971	TL8637740698; 52°02′00″N 0°42′56″E		1037521	Upload Photo	Q26289243
3 and 40, Burkitts Lane	II	3 and 40, Burkitts Lane, CO10 1HB			26 October 1971	TL8730141292; 52°02′18″N 0°43′46″E		1285555	Upload Photo	Q26574242
3 and 4, Church Street	II	3 and 4, Church Street			26 October 1971	TL8694941058; 52°02′11″N 0°43′27″E		1037523	Upload Photo	Q26289245
5-7, Church Street	II	5-7, Church Street			3 March 1952	TL8694041043; 52°02′11″N 0°43′26″E		1194779	Upload Photo	Q26489392
12, Church Street	II	12, Church Street			22 September 1972	TL8691941001; 52°02′09″N 0°43′25″E		1051961	Upload Photo	Q26303777
14-16 Church Street	II	14-16, Church Street			26 October 1971	TL8690540972; 52°02′08″N 0°43′25″E		1037524	Upload Photo	Q26289246
17-20, Church Street	II	17-20, Church Street			26 October 1971	TL8690240968; 52°02′08″N 0°43′24″E		1194784	Upload Photo	Q26489399
21-25, Church Street	II	21-25, Church Street			26 October 1971	TL8689440952; 52°02′08″N 0°43′24″E		1037525	Upload Photo	Q26289247
Tyne House Wing of Number 26	II	26, Church Street			26 October 1971	TL8685240937; 52°02′07″N 0°43′22″E		1285521	Upload Photo	Q26574207
29 and 30, Church Street	II	29 and 30, Church Street			26 October 1971	TL8683340940; 52°02′07″N 0°43′21″E		1037527	Upload Photo	Q26289249
35 and 36, Church Street	II	35 and 36, Church Street	building		3 March 1952	TL8681440969; 52°02′08″N 0°43′20″E		1194792	35 and 36, Church Street More images	Q26489408
51, Church Street	II	51, Church Street			26 October 1971	TL8691941045; 52°02′11″N 0°43′25″E		1351344	Upload Photo	Q26634455
52, Church Street	II	52, Church Street			26 October 1971	TL8692241049; 52°02′11″N 0°43′26″E		1285526	Upload Photo	Q26574213
Church of All Saints	I	Church Street	church building		3 March 1952	TL8687440974; 52°02′08″N 0°43′23″E		1037522	Church of All Saints More images	Q17542045
School Hall	II	Church Street			26 October 1971	TL8686940931; 52°02′07″N 0°43′23″E		1037526	Upload Photo	Q26289248
The Old Vicarage	II	Church Street, CO10 2BL			26 October 1971	TL8684540998; 52°02′09″N 0°43′21″E		1037528	Upload Photo	Q26289250
Grammar School Hall, Cloister, and Former Headmaster's House	II	Cloister, And Former Headmaster's House, Old Market Place			3 March 1952	TL8709941194; 52°02′15″N 0°43′35″E		1180935	Upload Photo	Q26476273
12, Cross Street	II	12, Cross Street			26 October 1971	TL8684841112; 52°02′13″N 0°43′22″E		1285504	Upload Photo	Q26574194
15 and 16, Cross Street	II	15 and 16, Cross Street			26 October 1971	TL8684341095; 52°02′12″N 0°43′22″E		1351347	Upload Photo	Q26634458
21 and 22, Cross Street	II	21 and 22, Cross Street			26 October 1971	TL8683241067; 52°02′11″N 0°43′21″E		1037533	Upload Photo	Q26289255
Ye Old Moot Hall	II*	26, Cross Street	architectural structure		3 March 1952	TL8682641046; 52°02′11″N 0°43′21″E		1180344	Ye Old Moot Hall More images	Q17533624
55,56 and 58, Cross Street	II	55, 56 and 58, Cross Street			15 May 1996	TL8679241008; 52°02′10″N 0°43′19″E		1268467	Upload Photo	Q26558774
White Hart House	II	59 and 60, Cross Street			5 August 1992	TL8679441022; 52°02′10″N 0°43′19″E		1372435	Upload Photo	Q26653557
75-78, Cross Street	II	75-78, Cross Street			26 October 1971	TL8682641103; 52°02′13″N 0°43′21″E		1194830	Upload Photo	Q26489447
House and Small Shop (r B Maswell) Adjacent Stour Cottage on West	II	Cross Street			26 October 1971	TL8688341202; 52°02′16″N 0°43′24″E		1037532	Upload Photo	Q26289254
52-59, East Street	II	52-59, East Street			22 October 1973	TL8764841625; 52°02′29″N 0°44′05″E		1372436	Upload Photo	Q26653558
60-71, East Street	II	60-71, East Street			26 October 1971	TL8762141593; 52°02′28″N 0°44′03″E		1351348	Upload Photo	Q26634459
House and Office (peatling Cawdron) A Few Yards South East of White Horse Inn in North Street and with White Horse Yard Behind It	II	East Street			26 October 1971	TL8747541431; 52°02′22″N 0°43′55″E		1037534	Upload Photo	Q26289257
The Gainsborough Cinema	II	East Street			27 November 1973	TL8751241436; 52°02′23″N 0°43′57″E		1052001	Upload Photo	Q26303815
4 and 6, Friars Street	II	4 and 6, Friars Street			26 October 1971	TL8730241215; 52°02′16″N 0°43′46″E		1180439	Upload Photo	Q26475677
7 and 9, Friars Street	II	7 and 9, Friars Street			26 October 1971	TL8731541196; 52°02′15″N 0°43′46″E		1037535	Upload Photo	Q26289258
11 and 13, Friars Street	II	11 and 13, Friars Street			26 October 1971	TL8731341184; 52°02′15″N 0°43′46″E		1285512	Upload Photo	Q26574200
14 and 16, Friars Street	II	14 and 16, Friars Street			26 October 1971	TL8728541184; 52°02′15″N 0°43′45″E		1351373	Upload Photo	Q26634483
15, Friars Street	II	15, Friars Street			26 October 1971	TL8730341174; 52°02′14″N 0°43′46″E		1351349	Upload Photo	Q26634460
17, Friars Street	II*	17, Friars Street			3 March 1952	TL8730041167; 52°02′14″N 0°43′46″E		1037492	Upload Photo	Q26263402
18, Friars Street	II	18, Friars Street			26 October 1971	TL8728341175; 52°02′14″N 0°43′45″E		1037506	Upload Photo	Q26289228
20, Friars Street	II	20, Friars Street			26 October 1971	TL8727241170; 52°02′14″N 0°43′44″E		1180442	Upload Photo	Q26475682
21 and 23, Friars Street	II	21 and 23, Friars Street			3 March 1952	TL8729341153; 52°02′14″N 0°43′45″E		1351368	Upload Photo	Q26634478
24, Friars Street	II	24, Friars Street			26 October 1971	TL8724841124; 52°02′13″N 0°43′43″E		1037507	Upload Photo	Q26289229
25, Friars Street	II	25, Friars Street			26 October 1971	TL8728241134; 52°02′13″N 0°43′45″E		1037494	Upload Photo	Q26289215
26, Friars Street	II	26, Friars Street			26 October 1971	TL8724241116; 52°02′13″N 0°43′42″E		1351374	Upload Photo	Q26634484
27 and 29, Friars Street	II	27 and 29, Friars Street			26 October 1971	TL8727441123; 52°02′13″N 0°43′44″E		1037495	Upload Photo	Q26289216
28, Friars Street	II	28, Friars Street			26 October 1971	TL8723741110; 52°02′12″N 0°43′42″E		1285478	Upload Photo	Q26574168
31 and 31a, Friars Street	II	31 and 31a, Friars Street			3 March 1952	TL8726241106; 52°02′12″N 0°43′43″E		1351370	Upload Photo	Q26634480
32-38, Friars Street	II	32-38, Friars Street			26 October 1971	TL8722341094; 52°02′12″N 0°43′41″E		1037508	Upload Photo	Q26289230
The Friars	II	33, Friars Street			26 October 1971	TL8725041089; 52°02′12″N 0°43′43″E		1037496	Upload Photo	Q26289217
35, Friars Street and the Old Print Works, 35a Friars Street	II	35, Friars Street, CO10 2AG			3 March 1952	TL8724341080; 52°02′11″N 0°43′42″E		1351371	Upload Photo	Q26634481
37, Friars Street	II	37, Friars Street			3 March 1952	TL8723341076; 52°02′11″N 0°43′42″E		1037497	Upload Photo	Q26289218
Crantock	II	39, Friars Street			26 October 1971	TL8723041061; 52°02′11″N 0°43′42″E		1037498	Upload Photo	Q26289220
Grey Friars	II	40, Friars Street			26 October 1971	TL8721441086; 52°02′12″N 0°43′41″E		1351375	Upload Photo	Q26634485
41, Friars Street	II	41, Friars Street			26 October 1971	TL8721641062; 52°02′11″N 0°43′41″E		1351372	Upload Photo	Q26634482
42-50, Friars Street	II	42-50, Friars Street			3 March 1952	TL8718241066; 52°02′11″N 0°43′39″E		1180455	Upload Photo	Q26475700
Angel Inn	II	43, Friars Street			26 October 1971	TL8720941058; 52°02′11″N 0°43′41″E		1180391	Upload Photo	Q26475614
45, Friars Street	II	45, Friars Street			26 October 1971	TL8719741054; 52°02′11″N 0°43′40″E		1037499	Upload Photo	Q26289221
49, Friars Street	II	49, Friars Street			26 October 1971	TL8718841048; 52°02′10″N 0°43′40″E		1037500	Upload Photo	Q26289222
51, Friars Street	II	51, Friars Street			26 October 1971	TL8718041047; 52°02′10″N 0°43′39″E		1285493	Upload Photo	Q26574183
52, Friars Street	II	52, Friars Street			3 March 1952	TL8717041060; 52°02′11″N 0°43′39″E		1037509	Upload Photo	Q26289231
Priory Cottage	II	53, Friars Street			26 October 1971	TL8707141016; 52°02′10″N 0°43′33″E		1037502	Upload Photo	Q26289224
54 and 56, Friars Street	II	54 and 56, Friars Street, CO10 2AG			3 March 1952	TL8714541055; 52°02′11″N 0°43′37″E		1180466	Upload Photo	Q26475714
55, Friars Street	II	55, Friars Street			26 October 1971	TL8707341035; 52°02′10″N 0°43′33″E		1037503	Upload Photo	Q26289225
Priory Gate	II*	57, Friars Street	gate		3 March 1952	TL8706241036; 52°02′10″N 0°43′33″E		1285460	Priory Gate More images	Q17534150
58, Friars Street	II	58, Friars Street			3 March 1952	TL8712741049; 52°02′11″N 0°43′36″E		1351376	Upload Photo	Q26634486
Ship and Star Inn	II	59 and 61, Friars Street			3 March 1952	TL8702741042; 52°02′10″N 0°43′31″E		1037505	Upload Photo	Q26289227
66 and 68, Friars Street	II	66 and 68, Friars Street			26 October 1971	TL8707341062; 52°02′11″N 0°43′34″E		1180472	Upload Photo	Q26475720
74 and 76, Friars Street	II	74 and 76, Friars Street			26 October 1971	TL8701241065; 52°02′11″N 0°43′30″E		1037511	Upload Photo	Q26289233
86-88, Friars Street	II	86-88, Friars Street			26 October 1971	TL8696841092; 52°02′12″N 0°43′28″E		1351377	Upload Photo	Q26634487
Ancient Wall Remains in the Garden of Number 57	II	Friars Street			26 October 1971	TL8705240982; 52°02′08″N 0°43′32″E		1037504	Upload Photo	Q26289226
Ancient Wall in Garden of Number 53a	II	Friars Street			26 October 1971	TL8709040981; 52°02′08″N 0°43′34″E		1180402	Upload Photo	Q26475627
Wall North West of Sports Ground	II	Friars Street			26 October 1971	TL8710641035; 52°02′10″N 0°43′35″E		1037501	Upload Photo	Q26289223
Walls of Burial Ground of Friends Meeting House	II	Friars Street			26 October 1971	TL8734441118; 52°02′13″N 0°43′48″E		1351369	Upload Photo	Q26634479
6, Gainsborough Street	II	6, Gainsborough Street			26 October 1971	TL8727241250; 52°02′17″N 0°43′44″E		1180475	Upload Photo	Q26475722
7, Gainsborough Street	II	7, Gainsborough Street			26 October 1971	TL8726241250; 52°02′17″N 0°43′44″E		1037512	Upload Photo	Q26289235
The Christopher Inn	II	9 and 10, Gainsborough Street			26 October 1971	TL8723941251; 52°02′17″N 0°43′43″E		1180477	Upload Photo	Q26475724
Treasure Chest	II	11, Gainsborough Street			26 October 1971	TL8722641250; 52°02′17″N 0°43′42″E		1351378	Upload Photo	Q26634489
The Gainsborough Bookshop	II	12, Gainsborough Street			26 October 1971	TL8722041250; 52°02′17″N 0°43′42″E		1037471	Upload Photo	Q26289190
13-15, Gainsborough Street	II	13-15, Gainsborough Street			26 October 1971	TL8721441248; 52°02′17″N 0°43′41″E		1037472	Upload Photo	Q26289192
18, Gainsborough Street	II	18, Gainsborough Street			26 October 1971	TL8719041220; 52°02′16″N 0°43′40″E		1351396	Upload Photo	Q26634504
Rectory	II	19, Gainsborough Street			26 October 1971	TL8716841234; 52°02′16″N 0°43′39″E		1037473	Upload Photo	Q26289195
24-27, Gainsborough Street	II	24-27, Gainsborough Street			26 October 1971	TL8710841241; 52°02′17″N 0°43′36″E		1037474	Upload Photo	Q26289196
28-30, Gainsborough Street	II	28-30, Gainsborough Street			26 October 1971	TL8711241258; 52°02′17″N 0°43′36″E		1037475	Upload Photo	Q26289197
Karl Lindekam	II	31, Gainsborough Street			26 October 1971	TL8712741256; 52°02′17″N 0°43′37″E		1351360	Upload Photo	Q26634470
32, Gainsborough Street	II	32, Gainsborough Street			26 October 1971	TL8713441257; 52°02′17″N 0°43′37″E		1037476	Upload Photo	Q26289198
33, Gainsborough Street	II	33, Gainsborough Street			26 October 1971	TL8714241257; 52°02′17″N 0°43′38″E		1351361	Upload Photo	Q26634471
34 and 35, Gainsborough Street	II	34 and 35, Gainsborough Street			26 October 1971	TL8714941258; 52°02′17″N 0°43′38″E		1037477	Upload Photo	Q26289199
36, Gainsborough Street	II	36, Gainsborough Street			26 October 1971	TL8716641258; 52°02′17″N 0°43′39″E		1351362	Upload Photo	Q26634472
37 and 38, Gainsborough Street	II	37 and 38, Gainsborough Street			26 October 1971	TL8717441263; 52°02′17″N 0°43′39″E		1037478	Upload Photo	Q26289200
41, Gainsborough Street	II	41, Gainsborough Street			26 October 1971	TL8719941264; 52°02′17″N 0°43′41″E		1285426	Upload Photo	Q26574119
42 and 43, Gainsborough Street	II	42 and 43, Gainsborough Street			26 October 1971	TL8720541267; 52°02′17″N 0°43′41″E		1037479	Upload Photo	Q26289201
44 and 45, Gainsborough Street	II	44 and 45, Gainsborough Street			26 October 1971	TL8721541268; 52°02′18″N 0°43′41″E		1180519	Upload Photo	Q26475775
Gainsborough's House	I	46, Gainsborough Street	historic house museum		3 March 1952	TL8723141269; 52°02′18″N 0°43′42″E		1037480	Gainsborough's House More images	Q16981573
47, Gainsborough Street	II	47, Gainsborough Street			26 October 1971	TL8724141271; 52°02′18″N 0°43′43″E		1037481	Upload Photo	Q26289202
53, Gainsborough Street	II	53, Gainsborough Street			3 March 1952	TL8728441278; 52°02′18″N 0°43′45″E		1180539	Upload Photo	Q26475801
54 and 55, Gainsborough Street	II	54 and 55, Gainsborough Street			26 October 1971	TL8728941282; 52°02′18″N 0°43′45″E		1037482	Upload Photo	Q26289203
Outbuilding to Number 19	II	Gainsborough Street			26 October 1971	TL8714941237; 52°02′17″N 0°43′38″E		1351397	Upload Photo	Q26634505
Archway of Former Gaol	II	Gaol Lane			26 October 1971	TL8741241373; 52°02′21″N 0°43′52″E		1037483	Upload Photo	Q26289204
39, Gregory Street	II	39, Gregory Street			26 October 1971	TL8707841409; 52°02′22″N 0°43′34″E		1180553	Upload Photo	Q26475819
41 and 43, Gregory Street	II	41 and 43, Gregory Street			26 October 1971	TL8707641417; 52°02′23″N 0°43′34″E		1037484	Upload Photo	Q26289205
47-51 and 53 (gregory Cottage)	II	47-51, Gregory Street			26 October 1971	TL8706441432; 52°02′23″N 0°43′34″E		1285419	Upload Photo	Q26574113
War Memorial Opposite St Gregory's Church	II	Gregory Street	war memorial		12 December 2000	TL8708141439; 52°02′23″N 0°43′35″E		1389148	War Memorial Opposite St Gregory's Church More images	Q26668591
1 and 2, King Street	II	1 and 2, King Street			3 March 1952	TL8747341342; 52°02′20″N 0°43′55″E		1037485	Upload Photo	Q26289206
5, King Street	II	5, King Street			15 June 1971	TL8750441320; 52°02′19″N 0°43′57″E		1180596	Upload Photo	Q26475875
6, King Street	II	6, King Street			15 June 1971	TL8751241323; 52°02′19″N 0°43′57″E		1351363	Upload Photo	Q26634473
Royal Oak Inn	II	7 and 8, King Street			26 October 1971	TL8752341319; 52°02′19″N 0°43′58″E		1037486	Upload Photo	Q26289207
9, King Street	II	9, King Street			26 October 1971	TL8753441319; 52°02′19″N 0°43′58″E		1285396	Upload Photo	Q26574092
10 and 11, King Street	II	10 and 11, King Street			26 October 1971	TL8754241318; 52°02′19″N 0°43′59″E		1037487	Upload Photo	Q26289209
22, King Street	II	22, King Street			26 October 1971	TL8742541295; 52°02′18″N 0°43′52″E		1037488	Upload Photo	Q26289210
32, King Street	II	32, King Street			26 October 1971	TL8749541299; 52°02′18″N 0°43′56″E		1351364	Upload Photo	Q26634474
Bear Hotel	II	King Street	hotel		26 October 1971	TL8755841321; 52°02′19″N 0°43′59″E		1285362	Bear Hotel More images	Q26574061
1, 2 and 2a, Market Hill	II	1, 2 and 2a, Market Hill, CO10 2EA			26 October 1971	TL8730541286; 52°02′18″N 0°43′46″E		1351365	Upload Photo	Q26634475
3 and 4, Market Hill	II	3 and 4, Market Hill			26 October 1971	TL8731041289; 52°02′18″N 0°43′46″E		1285345	Upload Photo	Q26574044
5, 6 and 6a, Market Hill	II	5, 6 and 6a, Market Hill			3 August 1971	TL8732641308; 52°02′19″N 0°43′47″E		1037489	Upload Photo	Q26289211
8, Market Hill	II	8, Market Hill			26 October 1971	TL8734341311; 52°02′19″N 0°43′48″E		1180688	Upload Photo	Q26475994
9, Market Hill	II	9, Market Hill			26 October 1971	TL8734941314; 52°02′19″N 0°43′48″E		1351366	Upload Photo	Q26634476
10 and 11, Market Hill	II	10 and 11, Market Hill			26 October 1971	TL8735241319; 52°02′19″N 0°43′49″E		1285355	Upload Photo	Q26574054
12, Market Hill	II	12, Market Hill			26 October 1971	TL8736041333; 52°02′19″N 0°43′49″E		1037491	Upload Photo	Q26289213
13 and 14, Market Hill	II	13 and 14, Market Hill			26 October 1971	TL8736741338; 52°02′20″N 0°43′49″E		1351367	Upload Photo	Q26634477
15 and 16, Market Hill	II	15 and 16, Market Hill			10 November 1969	TL8737841342; 52°02′20″N 0°43′50″E		1285360	Upload Photo	Q26574059
17, 18 and 18a, Market Hill	II	17, 18 and 18a, Market Hill			26 October 1971	TL8739041337; 52°02′20″N 0°43′51″E		1031580	Upload Photo	Q26282965
23 and 24, Market Hill	II	23 and 24, Market Hill			26 October 1971	TL8741341294; 52°02′18″N 0°43′52″E		1037453	Upload Photo	Q26289171
25-27, Market Hill	II	25-27, Market Hill			26 October 1971	TL8740541294; 52°02′18″N 0°43′51″E		1351388	Upload Photo	Q26634497
28, Market Hill	II	28, Market Hill			26 October 1971	TL8739141285; 52°02′18″N 0°43′51″E		1037454	Upload Photo	Q26289172
29, Market Hill	II	29, Market Hill			26 October 1971	TL8738441281; 52°02′18″N 0°43′50″E		1037455	Upload Photo	Q26289173
30, Market Hill	II*	30, Market Hill			3 March 1952	TL8737541274; 52°02′18″N 0°43′50″E		1351389	Upload Photo	Q26268217
31, Market Hill	II	31, Market Hill			26 October 1971	TL8737041266; 52°02′17″N 0°43′49″E		1037456	Upload Photo	Q26289174
Barclays Bank	II	35, Market Hill			26 October 1971	TL8734441240; 52°02′16″N 0°43′48″E		1037458	Upload Photo	Q26289175
36 and 37, Market Hill	II	36 and 37, Market Hill			26 October 1971	TL8733441231; 52°02′16″N 0°43′48″E		1180788	Upload Photo	Q26476105
38 and 39, Market Hill	II	38 and 39, Market Hill			26 October 1971	TL8732841223; 52°02′16″N 0°43′47″E		1037459	Upload Photo	Q26289176
40-42, Market Hill	II	40-42, Market Hill			26 October 1971	TL8730641234; 52°02′16″N 0°43′46″E		1285319	Upload Photo	Q26574023
43 and 44, Market Hill	II	43 and 44, Market Hill			26 October 1971	TL8731241255; 52°02′17″N 0°43′46″E		1037460	Upload Photo	Q26289177
Black Boy Hotel	II	Market Hill	hotel		3 March 1952	TL8733841306; 52°02′19″N 0°43′48″E		1037490	Black Boy Hotel More images	Q26289212
Church of St Peter	I	Market Hill	church building		3 March 1952	TL8743841325; 52°02′19″N 0°43′53″E		1180665	Church of St Peter More images	Q7595292
Corn Exchange Public Library	II*	Market Hill	public library		26 October 1971	TL8735241252; 52°02′17″N 0°43′49″E		1037457	Corn Exchange Public Library More images	Q17533545
Former Sudbury Institute Club (now Part of Barclays Bank)	II	Market Hill			26 October 1971	TL8734041237; 52°02′16″N 0°43′48″E		1351391	Upload Photo	Q26634499
Statue of Thomas Gainsborough	II	Market Hill	statue		26 October 1971	TL8740041314; 52°02′19″N 0°43′51″E		1351387	Statue of Thomas Gainsborough More images	Q26634496
Town Hall	II	Market Hill	city hall		3 March 1952	TL8742741371; 52°02′21″N 0°43′53″E		1037452	Town Hall More images	Q26289169
Westminster Bank	II	Market Hill			26 October 1971	TL8736041262; 52°02′17″N 0°43′49″E		1351390	Upload Photo	Q26634498
Highfield Mill Highfield Millhouse	II	Melford Road			26 October 1971	TL8657342943; 52°03′12″N 0°43′11″E		1037461	Upload Photo	Q26289178
2-10, Middleton Road	II	2-10, Middleton Road			3 March 1952	TL8640540671; 52°01′59″N 0°42′58″E		1180811	Upload Photo	Q26476128
32, Mill Lane	II	32, Mill Lane			5 March 1998	TL8689841172; 52°02′15″N 0°43′25″E		1376750	Upload Photo	Q26657275
Flint Lodge	II	Newton Road			26 October 1971	TL8807541390; 52°02′20″N 0°44′27″E		1037462	Upload Photo	Q26289179
The Folly at Oakville	II	Newton Road			18 December 1997	TL8796141315; 52°02′18″N 0°44′21″E		1031560	Upload Photo	Q26282943
1, North Street	II	1, North Street			26 October 1971	TL8743641392; 52°02′21″N 0°43′53″E		1285292	Upload Photo	Q26573998
2, North Street	II	2, North Street			3 June 1970	TL8743041401; 52°02′22″N 0°43′53″E		1037463	Upload Photo	Q26289181
3, North Street	II	3, North Street			26 October 1971	TL8742641408; 52°02′22″N 0°43′53″E		1285294	Upload Photo	Q26574000
4, North Street	II	4, North Street			26 October 1971	TL8742241417; 52°02′22″N 0°43′52″E		1037464	Upload Photo	Q26289182
5-7, North Street	II	5-7, North Street			26 October 1971	TL8741041422; 52°02′22″N 0°43′52″E		1037465	Upload Photo	Q26289183
9 and 9a, North Street	II	9 and 9a, North Street			26 October 1971	TL8740141448; 52°02′23″N 0°43′51″E		1285262	Upload Photo	Q26573969
16, North Street	II	16, North Street, CO10 1RB			26 October 1971	TL8736641503; 52°02′25″N 0°43′50″E		1180852	Upload Photo	Q26476176
17 and 17a North Street	II	17 and 17a, North Street, CO10 1RB			26 October 1971	TL8736241508; 52°02′25″N 0°43′50″E		1037466	Upload Photo	Q26289184
24, North Street	II	24, North Street			26 October 1971	TL8733741538; 52°02′26″N 0°43′48″E		1037467	Upload Photo	Q26289185
25 North Street	II	25, North Street			26 October 1971	TL8733041539; 52°02′26″N 0°43′48″E		1180862	Upload Photo	Q26476187
38 and 39, North Street	II	38 and 39, North Street			26 October 1971	TL8729941594; 52°02′28″N 0°43′46″E		1351392	Upload Photo	Q26634500
40 and 41, North Street	II	40 and 41, North Street			26 October 1971	TL8729541604; 52°02′28″N 0°43′46″E		1037468	Upload Photo	Q26289186
42, North Street	II	42, North Street			26 October 1971	TL8728941611; 52°02′29″N 0°43′46″E		1285274	Upload Photo	Q26573981
48, North Street	II	48, North Street			26 October 1971	TL8727141644; 52°02′30″N 0°43′45″E		1180880	Upload Photo	Q26476208
63, North Street	II	63, North Street			27 July 1977	TL8732241596; 52°02′28″N 0°43′48″E		1051962	Upload Photo	Q26303778
71, North Street	II	71, North Street			26 October 1971	TL8735641553; 52°02′27″N 0°43′49″E		1351393	Upload Photo	Q26634501
72 and 73, North Street	II	72 and 73, North Street			26 October 1971	TL8736041543; 52°02′26″N 0°43′49″E		1037469	Upload Photo	Q26289187
83, North Street	II	83, North Street			26 October 1971	TL8738641503; 52°02′25″N 0°43′51″E		1180889	Upload Photo	Q26476216
84, North Street	II	84, North Street			26 October 1971	TL8739141497; 52°02′25″N 0°43′51″E		1351394	Upload Photo	Q26634502
85 and 86, North Street	II	85 and 86, North Street			26 October 1971	TL8739641491; 52°02′25″N 0°43′51″E		1180896	Upload Photo	Q26476225
87 and 88, North Street	II	87 and 88, North Street			26 October 1971	TL8740241478; 52°02′24″N 0°43′52″E		1351395	Upload Photo	Q26634503
90, North Street	II	90, North Street			26 October 1971	TL8741041470; 52°02′24″N 0°43′52″E		1285247	Upload Photo	Q26573954
91, North Street	II	91, North Street			26 October 1971	TL8741641468; 52°02′24″N 0°43′52″E		1037430	Upload Photo	Q26289149
92, North Street	II	92, North Street			26 October 1971	TL8742141461; 52°02′24″N 0°43′53″E		1037431	Upload Photo	Q26289151
96, North Street	II	96, North Street			26 October 1971	TL8744341432; 52°02′23″N 0°43′54″E		1180911	Upload Photo	Q26476243
98 and 99, North Street	II	98 and 99, North Street			26 October 1971	TL8745841417; 52°02′22″N 0°43′54″E		1180923	Upload Photo	Q26476257
Archway at Entrance to Sudbury Junior School	II	North Street			26 October 1971	TL8739541484; 52°02′24″N 0°43′51″E		1037470	Upload Photo	Q26289189
White Horse Hotel	II	North Street	hotel		26 October 1971	TL8745041425; 52°02′22″N 0°43′54″E		1351415	White Horse Hotel More images	Q26634524
3, Old Market Place	II	3, Old Market Place			26 October 1971	TL8743541385; 52°02′21″N 0°43′53″E		1351416	Upload Photo	Q26634525
7, Old Market Place	II	7, Old Market Place, CO10 1TL			29 September 1971	TL8746741363; 52°02′20″N 0°43′55″E		1037432	Upload Photo	Q26289152
Chapel at St Bartholomew's Priory Farm	II*	Priory Farm, St Bartholomew's Lane	chapel		3 March 1952	TL8709942803; 52°03′07″N 0°43′38″E		1037546	Chapel at St Bartholomew's Priory Farm More images	Q17533569
Former Granary A	II	Quay Lane			27 July 1977	TL8722440821; 52°02′03″N 0°43′41″E		1051963	Upload Photo	Q26303779
Former Granary B	II	Quay Lane			27 July 1977	TL8725940852; 52°02′04″N 0°43′43″E		1372455	Upload Photo	Q26653577
Trinity House	II	School Lane			26 October 1971	TL8704741147; 52°02′14″N 0°43′32″E		1351417	Upload Photo	Q26634526
Wall Adjoining Trinity House to South	II	School Lane			26 October 1971	TL8704441115; 52°02′13″N 0°43′32″E		1180971	Upload Photo	Q26476310
Hive Community Hub	II	School Street, CO10 2HA	church building		26 October 1971	TL8711741213; 52°02′16″N 0°43′36″E		1037433	Hive Community Hub More images	Q26289153
St Bartholomew's Priory Farmhouse	II	St Bartholomew's Lane			9 April 1990	TL8712742801; 52°03′07″N 0°43′40″E		1372454	Upload Photo	Q26653576
1 (the Stone) and 2 Stour Street	II	1 (the Stone) And 2, Stour Street			3 March 1952	TL8708441244; 52°02′17″N 0°43′34″E		1037434	Upload Photo	Q26289154
3 and 4, Stour Street	II	3 and 4, Stour Street			26 October 1971	TL8707741244; 52°02′17″N 0°43′34″E		1180981	Upload Photo	Q26476321
5, Stour Street	II	5, Stour Street			3 March 1952	TL8706741243; 52°02′17″N 0°43′34″E		1037435	Upload Photo	Q26289155
6, Stour Street	II	6, Stour Street			3 March 1952	TL8706241241; 52°02′17″N 0°43′33″E		1351380	Upload Photo	Q26634491
St Mary's	II	16, Stour Street			26 October 1971	TL8703541236; 52°02′17″N 0°43′32″E		1285211	Upload Photo	Q26573923
19, Stour Street	II	19, Stour Street			3 March 1952	TL8701441234; 52°02′17″N 0°43′31″E		1037436	Upload Photo	Q26289156
Garden Wall Adjoining Stour Hall West	II	Stour Street			26 October 1971	TL8693541243; 52°02′17″N 0°43′27″E		1181015	Upload Photo	Q26476360
Hardwicke House	II	Stour Street			26 October 1971	TL8705441263; 52°02′18″N 0°43′33″E		1372433	Upload Photo	Q26653555
Salter's Hall	I	Stour Street	architectural structure		3 March 1952	TL8698041232; 52°02′17″N 0°43′29″E		1181004	Salter's Hall More images	Q17542123
Stour Hall	II*	Stour Street	house		3 March 1952	TL8697841250; 52°02′17″N 0°43′29″E		1037437	Stour Hall More images	Q17533523
Stour House (nurses Home)	II	Stour Street			26 October 1971	TL8707441283; 52°02′18″N 0°43′34″E		1051998	Upload Photo	Q26303812
The Chantry	I	Stour Street	architectural structure		3 March 1952	TL8699741232; 52°02′17″N 0°43′30″E		1351381	The Chantry More images	Q17542398
18, the Croft	II	18, The Croft			26 October 1971	TL8698041516; 52°02′26″N 0°43′30″E		1037529	Upload Photo	Q26289251
19, the Croft	II	19, The Croft			26 October 1971	TL8697941532; 52°02′26″N 0°43′30″E		1351345	Upload Photo	Q26634456
Catholic Church of Our Lady and St John the Evangelist with Attached Presbytery, Sudbury	II	The Croft, CO10 1HW	church building		26 October 1971	TL8697741544; 52°02′27″N 0°43′29″E		1285531	Catholic Church of Our Lady and St John the Evangelist with Attached Presbytery, Sudbury More images	Q26574218
Former Stable Block at River House	II	The Croft, CO10 1HW			26 October 1971	TL8696941594; 52°02′28″N 0°43′29″E		1194821	Upload Photo	Q26489438
Front Wall of Garden of the Convent	II	The Croft			26 October 1971	TL8701441622; 52°02′29″N 0°43′32″E		1351346	Upload Photo	Q26634457
River House	II	The Croft, CO10 1HW			26 October 1971	TL8696741575; 52°02′28″N 0°43′29″E		1037530	Upload Photo	Q26289252
The Convent	II	The Croft			26 October 1971	TL8701941635; 52°02′30″N 0°43′32″E		1037531	Upload Photo	Q26289253
Corn Mill (sudbury Flour Mills)	II	Walnut Tree Lane	building		26 October 1971	TL8692741302; 52°02′19″N 0°43′26″E		1051999	Corn Mill (sudbury Flour Mills) More images	Q26303813
11 and 12, Weaver's Lane	II	11 and 12, Weaver's Lane			26 October 1971	TL8724041351; 52°02′20″N 0°43′43″E		1052000	Upload Photo	Q26303814
1 and 2, Weavers Lane	II	1 and 2, Weavers Lane			26 October 1971	TL8724041290; 52°02′18″N 0°43′43″E		1372434	Upload Photo	Q26653556
Gateway to St Gregory's College (now Modern Workhouse), West Side of Churchyard	II	West Side Of Churchyard			26 October 1971	TL8703241464; 52°02′24″N 0°43′32″E		1194668	Upload Photo	Q26489283

== See also ==
- Grade I listed buildings in Suffolk
- Grade II* listed buildings in Suffolk

== Sources ==
- Bettely, James; Pevsner, Nikolaus (2015) [1961], Suffolk: West, The Buildings of England, New Haven and London: Yale University Press, ISBN 978-0-300-19655-9
