= Listed buildings in Boxted, Suffolk =

Civil Parish in Suffolk, England

Boxted is a village and civil parish in the Babergh District of Suffolk, England. It contains 13 listed buildings that are recorded in the National Heritage List for England. Of these one is grade I, two are grade II* and ten are grade II.

This list is based on the information retrieved online from Historic England.

== Key ==
Grade	Criteria
I	Buildings that are of exceptional interest
II*	Particularly important buildings of more than special interest
II	Buildings that are of special interest

== Listing ==
Name	Grade	Location	Type	Completed (Note: The date given is the date used by Historic England as significant for the initial building or that of an important part in the structure's description.)	Date designated	Grid ref. (Note: The grid reference is based on the British national grid reference system, sometimes known as OSGB36, used by the Ordnance Survey.) Geo-coordinates	Notes	Entry number (Note: The "List Entry Number" is a unique number assigned to each listed building and scheduled monument by Historic England.)	Image	Wikidata
Boxted Hall	II*		house		10 January 1953	TL8276850570; 52°07′24″N 0°40′06″E		1351740	Boxted Hall More images	Q17534608
Garden Wall and Pavilions to Boxted Hall	II				9 February 1978	TL8285650639; 52°07′26″N 0°40′11″E		1036707	Upload Photo	Q26288389
Hill House	II				9 February 1978	TL8238850412; 52°07′19″N 0°39′46″E		1036706	Upload Photo	Q26288388
Stables at Boxted Hall	II				10 January 1953	TL8269950655; 52°07′26″N 0°40′03″E		1194356	Upload Photo	Q26488983
Street House	II				15 September 2006	TL8283051183; 52°07′43″N 0°40′11″E		1391755	Upload Photo	Q26671107
Trucketts Hall	II				10 January 1953	TL8114550050; 52°07′09″N 0°38′40″E		1194317	Upload Photo	Q26488944
Church of the Holy Trinity	I	Braggon's Hill, IP29 4LN	church building		23 March 1961	TL8248450465; 52°07′21″N 0°39′51″E		1351739	Church of the Holy Trinity More images	Q17542512
Moorhouse Farm	II	Bury St Edmunds, IP29 4JR			17 April 2023	TL8209851284; 52°07′47″N 0°39′32″E		1485365	Upload Photo	Q126688912
Fishers	II*	Fenstead End			10 January 1953	TL8076050394; 52°07′20″N 0°38′20″E		1036708	Upload Photo	Q17532973
Water Hall	II	Glemsford Road			9 February 1978	TL8266651126; 52°07′42″N 0°40′02″E		1194396	Upload Photo	Q26489022
Thatched Cottages	II	1 and 2, The Street			9 February 1978	TL8268751344; 52°07′49″N 0°40′03″E		1351741	Upload Photo	Q26634815
3 and 4, the Street	II	3 and 4, The Street			10 January 1953	TL8264551320; 52°07′48″N 0°40′01″E		1285705	Upload Photo	Q26574375
Street Farm Cottage	II	The Street			9 February 1978	TL8280351193; 52°07′44″N 0°40′09″E		1036709	Upload Photo	Q26288390

== See also ==
- Grade I listed buildings in Suffolk
- Grade II* listed buildings in Suffolk

== Sources ==
- Bettely, James; Pevsner, Nikolaus (2015) [1961], Suffolk: West, The Buildings of England, New Haven and London: Yale University Press, ISBN 978-0-300-19655-9
