= Listed buildings in Glemsford =

Civil Parish in Suffolk, England

Glemsford is a village and civil parish in the Babergh District of Suffolk, England. It contains 47 listed buildings that are recorded in the National Heritage List for England. Of these one is grade I, four are grade II* and 42 are grade II.

This list is based on the information retrieved online from Historic England.

== Key ==
Grade	Criteria
I	Buildings that are of exceptional interest
II*	Particularly important buildings of more than special interest
II	Buildings that are of special interest

== Listing ==
Name	Grade	Location	Type	Completed (Note: The date given is the date used by Historic England as significant for the initial building or that of an important part in the structure's description.)	Date designated	Grid ref. (Note: The grid reference is based on the British national grid reference system, sometimes known as OSGB36, used by the Ordnance Survey.) Geo-coordinates	Notes	Entry number (Note: The "List Entry Number" is a unique number assigned to each listed building and scheduled monument by Historic England.)	Image	Wikidata
Coldhams House	II				31 August 1988	TL8255248142; 52°06′05″N 0°39′50″E		1033463	Upload Photo	Q26284945
13-15, Bells Lane	II	13-15, Bells Lane			9 February 1978	TL8306948392; 52°06′13″N 0°40′18″E		1351734	Upload Photo	Q26634811
17 and 17a, Bells Lane	II	17 and 17a, Bells Lane			9 February 1978	TL8329248280; 52°06′09″N 0°40′29″E		1285482	Upload Photo	Q26574172
6 and 8, Brook Street	II	6 and 8, Brook Street			9 February 1978	TL8295848505; 52°06′17″N 0°40′12″E		1036646	Upload Photo	Q26288332
The Crown Inn	II	38, Brook Street			9 February 1978	TL8294948770; 52°06′25″N 0°40′12″E		1036647	Upload Photo	Q26288333
Brook Street Hall, Numbers 5-11 Brook Street and Army Cadet Force Centre	II	Brook Street			31 October 1973	TL8293548550; 52°06′18″N 0°40′11″E		1351752	Upload Photo	Q26634824
Clock House	II	Cavendish Lane			9 February 1978	TL8243548054; 52°06′03″N 0°39′44″E		1351753	Upload Photo	Q26634825
Patches House	II	Cavendish Lane			9 February 1978	TL8255448064; 52°06′03″N 0°39′50″E		1036648	Upload Photo	Q26288334
2, Chequers Lane	II	2, Chequers Lane			9 February 1978	TL8301248766; 52°06′25″N 0°40′15″E		1351754	Upload Photo	Q26634826
13-17, Chequers Lane	II*	13-17, Chequers Lane	building		23 March 1961	TL8298448806; 52°06′26″N 0°40′14″E		1036649	13-17, Chequers Lane More images	Q17532892
14 and 16, Churchgate	II	14 and 16, Churchgate			9 February 1978	TL8337148328; 52°06′10″N 0°40′33″E		1351755	Upload Photo	Q26634827
Church of St Mary	I	Churchgate	church building		9 February 1978	TL8341648388; 52°06′12″N 0°40′36″E		1036650	Church of St Mary More images	Q17541702
Churchgate Farmhouse	II	Churchgate			9 September 1993	TL8335048376; 52°06′12″N 0°40′32″E		1234036	Upload Photo	Q26527463
Park Farmhouse	II	Churchgate	farmhouse		10 January 1953	TL8341448343; 52°06′11″N 0°40′36″E		1036651	Park Farmhouse More images	Q26288335
Barn and Outbuildings at Hill Farmhouse	II	Duff's Hill			9 February 1978	TL8290349036; 52°06′34″N 0°40′10″E		1351756	Upload Photo	Q26634828
Hill Farmhouse	II	Duffs Hill			9 February 1978	TL8292148961; 52°06′31″N 0°40′11″E		1036652	Upload Photo	Q26288336
4-8, Egremont Street	II	4-8, Egremont Street			10 January 1953	TL8287347563; 52°05′46″N 0°40′06″E		1036655	Upload Photo	Q26288338
5, Egremont Street	II	5, Egremont Street			9 February 1978	TL8290247544; 52°05′46″N 0°40′07″E		1285461	Upload Photo	Q26574153
Angel Inn	II	10, Egremont Street	inn		10 January 1953	TL8287247529; 52°05′45″N 0°40′06″E		1180449	Angel Inn More images	Q26475692
Angel House	II*	12 and 14, Egremont Street			23 March 1961	TL8287647515; 52°05′45″N 0°40′06″E		1036656	Upload Photo	Q17532901
16, Egremont Street	II	16, Egremont Street			9 February 1978	TL8286947495; 52°05′44″N 0°40′06″E		1285446	Upload Photo	Q26574139
22, 28 and 30, Egremont Street	II	22, 28 and 30, Egremont Street, Sudbury, CO10 7SA			9 February 1978	TL8286747444; 52°05′42″N 0°40′05″E		1180478	Upload Photo	Q26475726
24, Egremont Street	II	24, Egremont Street			9 February 1978	TL8285247450; 52°05′43″N 0°40′05″E		1036658	Upload Photo	Q26288341
32 and 34, Egremont Street	II	32 and 34, Egremont Street			10 January 1953	TL8287547430; 52°05′42″N 0°40′06″E		1036659	Upload Photo	Q26288342
Greyhound Cottage	II	42, Egremont Street			10 January 1953	TL8288847354; 52°05′39″N 0°40′06″E		1036660	Upload Photo	Q26288343
50 and 52, Egremont Street	II	50 and 52, Egremont Street			9 February 1978	TL8290447304; 52°05′38″N 0°40′07″E		1180526	Upload Photo	Q26475785
53 and 55, Egremont Street	II	53 and 55, Egremont Street			9 February 1978	TL8291847334; 52°05′39″N 0°40′08″E		1285471	Upload Photo	Q26574162
91-97, Egremont Street	II	91-97, Egremont Street			10 January 1953	TL8292147186; 52°05′34″N 0°40′08″E		1036654	Upload Photo	Q26288337
Ebenezer Baptist Chapel	II	Egremont Street			9 February 1978	TL8285347504; 52°05′44″N 0°40′05″E		1036657	Upload Photo	Q26288340
K6 Telephone Kiosk Immediately South of Nos 50 and 52	II	Egremont Street			11 March 1991	TL8290647303; 52°05′38″N 0°40′07″E		1276592	Upload Photo	Q26566094
The Little Cottage	II	Fair Green			18 February 2002	TL8289048413; 52°06′14″N 0°40′08″E		1359597	Upload Photo	Q26641822
Ferncroft	II	Fern Hill			9 February 1978	TL8246749321; 52°06′44″N 0°39′48″E		1036661	Upload Photo	Q26288344
Thatch End	II	Fern Hill			9 February 1978	TL8256349230; 52°06′41″N 0°39′53″E		1351757	Upload Photo	Q26634829
8, 10, 12 and 14, Hunts Hill	II	8, 10, 12 and 14, Hunts Hill			5 April 2000	TL8283947864; 52°05′56″N 0°40′05″E		1380204	Upload Photo	Q26660417
Glemsford County Primary School	II	Lion Road			9 February 1978	TL8269848234; 52°06′08″N 0°39′58″E		1180544	Upload Photo	Q26475807
The Black Lion Inn	II	Lion Road	inn		9 February 1978	TL8275448209; 52°06′07″N 0°40′01″E		1036662	The Black Lion Inn More images	Q26288345
1-3, Low Street	II	1-3, Low Street			9 February 1978	TL8268446594; 52°05′15″N 0°39′54″E		1180586	Upload Photo	Q26475862
Monks Cottage	II	Low Street			9 February 1978	TL8340448777; 52°06′25″N 0°40′36″E		1351758	Upload Photo	Q26634830
Monks Hall	II*	Low Street	house		23 March 1961	TL8342048820; 52°06′26″N 0°40′37″E		1285414	Monks Hall More images	Q17534138
Place Farmhouse	II	Low Street			9 February 1978	TL8355748907; 52°06′29″N 0°40′44″E		1036663	Upload Photo	Q26288346
Millhill Cottage	II	Plum Street			9 February 1978	TL8217648884; 52°06′30″N 0°39′32″E		1351759	Upload Photo	Q26634831
Potash House	II	Skate's Hill			9 February 1978	TL8304646703; 52°05′18″N 0°40′13″E		1036664	Upload Photo	Q26288347
Skate's Hill House	II	Skate's Hill			10 January 1953	TL8291547085; 52°05′31″N 0°40′07″E		1351760	Upload Photo	Q26634832
St Anthony's	II	Skates Hill			9 February 1978	TL8291147032; 52°05′29″N 0°40′07″E		1285388	Upload Photo	Q26574084
17 and 19, Tye Green	II	17 and 19, Tye Green			9 February 1978	TL8265448015; 52°06′01″N 0°39′55″E		1180606	Upload Photo	Q26475886
Peverells	II*	21-25, Tye Green	building		10 January 1953	TL8262548028; 52°06′02″N 0°39′54″E		1036665	Peverells More images	Q17532911
31 and 33, Tye Green	II	31 and 33, Tye Green			9 February 1978	TL8259648050; 52°06′02″N 0°39′52″E		1036666	Upload Photo	Q26288348

== See also ==
- Grade I listed buildings in Suffolk
- Grade II* listed buildings in Suffolk

== Sources ==
- Bettely, James; Pevsner, Nikolaus (2015) [1961], Suffolk: West, The Buildings of England, New Haven and London: Yale University Press, ISBN 978-0-300-19655-9
