= Listed buildings in Aldham, Suffolk =

Civil Parish in Suffolk, England

Aldham is a village and civil parish in the Babergh District of Suffolk, England. It contains six listed buildings that are recorded in the National Heritage List for England. Of these one is grade I and five are grade II.

This list is based on the information retrieved online from Historic England.

== Key ==
Grade	Criteria
I	Buildings that are of exceptional interest
II*	Particularly important buildings of more than special interest
II	Buildings that are of special interest

== Listing ==
Name	Grade	Location	Type	Completed (Note: The date given is the date used by Historic England as significant for the initial building or that of an important part in the structure's description.)	Date designated	Grid ref. (Note: The grid reference is based on the British national grid reference system, sometimes known as OSGB36, used by the Ordnance Survey.) Geo-coordinates	Notes	Entry number (Note: The "List Entry Number" is a unique number assigned to each listed building and scheduled monument by Historic England.)	Image	Wikidata
Aldham Hall	II	Church Lane	building		23 January 1958	TM0399744449; 52°03′39″N 0°58′28″E		1037439	Aldham Hall More images	Q26289157
Church Lane Cottage	II	Church Lane			10 July 1980	TM0377444695; 52°03′47″N 0°58′17″E		1037440	Upload Photo	Q26289158
Church of St Mary	I	Church Lane	church building		23 January 1958	TM0408444411; 52°03′38″N 0°58′32″E		1037438	Church of St Mary More images	Q17542019
Flemish House	II	Red Hill			10 July 1980	TM0324444508; 52°03′42″N 0°57′48″E		1037441	Upload Photo	Q26289159
Redhill Cottage	II	Red Hill			10 July 1980	TM0336544182; 52°03′31″N 0°57′54″E		1037442	Upload Photo	Q26289161
Yew Tree Farmhouse	II	The Street			10 July 1980	TM0459845267; 52°04′05″N 0°59′01″E		1037443	Upload Photo	Q26289162

== See also ==
- Grade I listed buildings in Suffolk
- Grade II* listed buildings in Suffolk

== Sources ==
- Bettely, James; Pevsner, Nikolaus (2015) [1961], Suffolk: West, The Buildings of England, New Haven and London: Yale University Press, ISBN 978-0-300-19655-9
