= Listed buildings in East Bergholt =

Civil Parish in Suffolk, England

East Bergholt is a village and civil parish in the Babergh District of Suffolk, England. It contains 89 listed buildings that are recorded in the National Heritage List for England. Of these five are grade I, seven are grade II* and 77 are grade II.

This list is based on the information retrieved online from Historic England.

== Key ==
Grade	Criteria
I	Buildings that are of exceptional interest
II*	Particularly important buildings of more than special interest
II	Buildings that are of special interest

== Listing ==
Name	Grade	Location	Type	Completed (Note: The date given is the date used by Historic England as significant for the initial building or that of an important part in the structure's description.)	Date designated	Grid ref. (Note: The grid reference is based on the British national grid reference system, sometimes known as OSGB36, used by the Ordnance Survey.) Geo-coordinates	Notes	Entry number (Note: The "List Entry Number" is a unique number assigned to each listed building and scheduled monument by Historic England.)	Image	Wikidata
Bridge Cottage	II*		historic house museum		22 February 1955	TM0758233336; 51°57′35″N 1°01′12″E		1033472	Bridge Cottage More images	Q4966212
Garden Cottage Whitehorse Cottage	II	B1070			29 May 1987	TM0843634250; 51°58′03″N 1°01′58″E		1033468	Upload Photo	Q26284951
Valley Farmhouse	I		farmhouse		22 February 1955	TM0775233269; 51°57′33″N 1°01′20″E		1033473	Valley Farmhouse More images	Q17541575
The Town House	II	1-3, Burnt Oak	house		22 February 1955	TM0779134344; 51°58′07″N 1°01′25″E		1033471	The Town House More images	Q26284954
Gable Cottage Peach Cottage	II	Burnt Oak			22 February 1955	TM0778334369; 51°58′08″N 1°01′24″E		1033470	Upload Photo	Q26284953
Oak Cottage	II	Burnt Oak			22 February 1955	TM0774534377; 51°58′08″N 1°01′22″E		1351948	Upload Photo	Q26635010
The Haywain	II	Burnt Oak			22 February 1955	TM0775734373; 51°58′08″N 1°01′23″E		1033469	Upload Photo	Q26284952
The Kings Head	II	Burnt Oak	pub		22 February 1955	TM0773234347; 51°58′08″N 1°01′22″E		1351909	The Kings Head More images	Q26634972
Vale Farmhouse	II	Cemetery Lane			5 June 1987	TM0641834673; 51°58′20″N 1°00′14″E		1198508	Upload Photo	Q26494537
Orchard House	II	Cutlers Lane			4 May 1995	TM0829335761; 51°58′52″N 1°01′54″E		1221615	Upload Photo	Q26515992
1 and 2 Meadow Cottages	II	1 and 2 Meadow Cottages, East End Road			29 May 1987	TM0914035229; 51°58′34″N 1°02′37″E		1351910	Upload Photo	Q26634973
Flatford Mill	I	Flatford	watermill		22 February 1955	TM0770833249; 51°57′32″N 1°01′18″E		1351931	Flatford Mill More images	Q5457890
Millers House and Cottage	I	Flatford	building		22 February 1955	TM0769833220; 51°57′31″N 1°01′17″E		1033437	Millers House and Cottage More images	Q17541552
Willy Lotts Cottage	I	Flatford	cottage		22 February 1955	TM0773433187; 51°57′30″N 1°01′19″E		1033438	Willy Lotts Cottage More images	Q8022575
Claycotts	II*	Flatford Road			22 February 1955	TM0776534226; 51°58′04″N 1°01′23″E		1351932	Upload Photo	Q17534677
Cottages to East of Yew Tree Cottages	II	Gandish Road			29 May 1987	TM0820534740; 51°58′20″N 1°01′47″E		1351933	Upload Photo	Q26634995
Gandish House	II	Gandish Road			29 May 1987	TM0813834718; 51°58′19″N 1°01′44″E		1033439	Upload Photo	Q26284919
Old Mill House	II	Gandish Road			29 May 1987	TM0826234893; 51°58′24″N 1°01′51″E		1033440	Upload Photo	Q26284920
Carriers Arms	II	Gaston End	pub		29 May 1987	TM0737135334; 51°58′40″N 1°01′05″E		1351934	Carriers Arms More images	Q26634996
Chaplains Cottage Gascoignes	II	Gaston End			29 May 1987	TM0746835391; 51°58′42″N 1°01′10″E		1033442	Upload Photo	Q26284923
Chaplins	II*	Gaston End			22 February 1955	TM0743635367; 51°58′41″N 1°01′08″E		1286166	Upload Photo	Q17534280
Stuarts	II	Gaston End			29 May 1987	TM0733735345; 51°58′40″N 1°01′03″E		1033441	Upload Photo	Q26284921
Fuschia Cottage	II	Gaston Street			29 May 1987	TM0717035068; 51°58′32″N 1°00′54″E		1033445	Upload Photo	Q26284926
Gaston House Including Front Garden Railings and Gate	II	Gaston Street			26 January 1967	TM0705834791; 51°58′23″N 1°00′47″E		1193473	Upload Photo	Q26488133
Richardsons Farmhouse	II	Gaston Street			22 February 1955	TM0721135069; 51°58′32″N 1°00′56″E		1193464	Upload Photo	Q26488123
Short Acre	II	Gaston Street			22 February 1955	TM0704234742; 51°58′21″N 1°00′46″E		1351936	Upload Photo	Q26634998
St Martins	II	Gaston Street			29 May 1987	TM0713834943; 51°58′28″N 1°00′52″E		1193465	Upload Photo	Q26488124
The Lambe School	II	Gaston Street			29 May 1987	TM0707834843; 51°58′24″N 1°00′48″E		1033444	Upload Photo	Q26284925
Throwers	II	Gaston Street			31 March 1987	TM0716035037; 51°58′31″N 1°00′53″E		1193497	Upload Photo	Q26488156
Tudor Cottage	II	Gaston Street			29 May 1987	TM0713435014; 51°58′30″N 1°00′52″E		1351937	Upload Photo	Q26685449
Tuffnells Including Gatepiers to Front Garden	II	Gaston Street			22 February 1955	TM0727635144; 51°58′34″N 1°00′59″E		1351935	Upload Photo	Q26634997
Wistaria Cottage	II	Gaston Street			29 May 1987	TM0715834992; 51°58′29″N 1°00′53″E		1033443	Upload Photo	Q26284924
Ackworth House	II	Hadleigh Road			29 May 1987	TM0654135039; 51°58′32″N 1°00′21″E		1033446	Upload Photo	Q26284928
Gatton House	II	Hadleigh Road			29 May 1987	TM0684334938; 51°58′28″N 1°00′36″E		1193513	Upload Photo	Q26488171
The Lodge	II*	Hadleigh Road			22 February 1955	TM0648735428; 51°58′44″N 1°00′19″E		1286124	Upload Photo	Q17534271
The Lodge Cottage	II	Hadleigh Road			22 February 1955	TM0651035460; 51°58′45″N 1°00′20″E		1351938	Upload Photo	Q26635000
The Hare and Hounds	II	Heath Road	pub		22 February 1955	TM0757435388; 51°58′41″N 1°01′16″E		1033447	The Hare and Hounds More images	Q26284929
Gothic House, Little Gothics and Commandree	II	Little Gothics And Commandree, Gaston Street, CO7 6SE			22 February 1955	TM0703634713; 51°58′20″N 1°00′46″E		1286137	Upload Photo	Q26574770
Tudor Cottage	II	Mission Lane			22 February 1955	TM0998535092; 51°58′29″N 1°03′21″E		1286129	Upload Photo	Q26574764
Park House	II	Park Road			22 February 1955	TM0974034707; 51°58′16″N 1°03′07″E		1033448	Upload Photo	Q26284930
Rookery Farmhouse	II	Putticks Lane			29 May 1987	TM0824335656; 51°58′49″N 1°01′51″E		1193563	Upload Photo	Q26488220
Blacksmiths Cottage	II	Quinton Road			29 May 1987	TM0752035531; 51°58′46″N 1°01′13″E		1193768	Upload Photo	Q26488411
Smithy	II	Quinton Road			29 May 1987	TM0753335533; 51°58′46″N 1°01′14″E		1351940	Upload Photo	Q26635002
Quintons Cottage	II	Quintons Corner, Woodgates Road, CO7 6RG			29 May 1987	TM0765635594; 51°58′48″N 1°01′20″E		1286029	Upload Photo	Q26574669
Quintons House	II	Quintons Corner, Woodgates Road, CO7 6RG			29 May 1987	TM0767135584; 51°58′48″N 1°01′21″E		1351939	Upload Photo	Q26635001
High Trees Farmhouse	II	Quintons Road			22 February 1955	TM0755435577; 51°58′48″N 1°01′15″E		1033450	Upload Photo	Q26284932
The Hermitage	II	Quintons Road			22 February 1955	TM0745035425; 51°58′43″N 1°01′09″E		1033449	Upload Photo	Q26284931
The Linnets	II	Quintons Road			29 May 1987	TM0755235555; 51°58′47″N 1°01′15″E		1193779	Upload Photo	Q26488424
Dairy Farm Cottages	II	1 and 2, Rectory Hill			29 May 1987	TM0742634482; 51°58′12″N 1°01′06″E		1285896	Upload Photo	Q26574553
Bellcage to North Side of Churchyard	II*	Rectory Hill	building		22 February 1955	TM0704134484; 51°58′13″N 1°00′46″E		1033451	Bellcage to North Side of Churchyard More images	Q17532678
Church of St Mary	I	Rectory Hill	church building		22 February 1955	TM0703334456; 51°58′12″N 1°00′45″E		1193803	Church of St Mary More images	Q17542216
Churchgate House	II*	Rectory Hill	house		22 February 1955	TM0708634463; 51°58′12″N 1°00′48″E		1033454	Churchgate House More images	Q17532689
Coach House to the Old Rectory	II	Rectory Hill			29 May 1987	TM0757734503; 51°58′13″N 1°01′14″E		1193992	Upload Photo	Q26488631
Gissings	II	Rectory Hill			22 February 1955	TM0741134487; 51°58′12″N 1°01′05″E		1033456	Upload Photo	Q26284937
Old Chapel House	II	Rectory Hill			22 February 1955	TM0715734485; 51°58′13″N 1°00′52″E		1193966	Upload Photo	Q26488605
Pair of Tombs to Revans Family in Churchyard of Church of St Mary	II	Rectory Hill			29 May 1987	TM0706834484; 51°58′13″N 1°00′47″E		1193939	Upload Photo	Q26488578
Rectory Hill Cottage Numbers 1 and 2 and St Marys Cottage	II	Rectory Hill			22 February 1955	TM0729434502; 51°58′13″N 1°00′59″E		1033455	Upload Photo	Q26284936
The Old Hall	II	Rectory Hill	house		22 February 1955	TM0710534362; 51°58′09″N 1°00′49″E		1033458	The Old Hall More images	Q26284939
The Old Rectory	II	Rectory Hill			22 February 1955	TM0759934479; 51°58′12″N 1°01′15″E		1033457	Upload Photo	Q26284938
Tomb to Golding and Ann Constable in Churchyard of Church of St Mary	II	Rectory Hill			29 May 1987	TM0706734487; 51°58′13″N 1°00′47″E		1033453	Upload Photo	Q26284934
Tomb to John Dunthorne in Churchyard of Church of St Mary	II	Rectory Hill			29 May 1987	TM0705434430; 51°58′11″N 1°00′46″E		1193884	Upload Photo	Q26488525
Tomb to John Lewis in Churchyard of St Mary	II	Rectory Hill			29 May 1987	TM0706234444; 51°58′12″N 1°00′47″E		1033452	Upload Photo	Q26284933
White House	II	Rectory Hill			29 May 1987	TM0736134506; 51°58′13″N 1°01′03″E		1193984	Upload Photo	Q26488623
Elm Farm, East Bergholt	II	Straight Road, Colchester, CO7 6UT			2 August 2011	TM0873735092; 51°58′30″N 1°02′16″E		1401377	Upload Photo	Q26675480
West Lodge Cottages	II	1, The Street			22 February 1955	TM0693534566; 51°58′16″N 1°00′40″E		1033420	Upload Photo	Q26284901
West Lodge Cottages	II	2, The Street			22 February 1955	TM0693134559; 51°58′15″N 1°00′40″E		1351963	Upload Photo	Q26685451
Beaufort Cottage and Former Barclays Bank	II	The Street, CO7 6TF			22 February 1955	TM0693734576; 51°58′16″N 1°00′40″E		1194143	Upload Photo	Q26488774
Chapel House Post Office the Old Manse	II	The Street			22 February 1955	TM0691934617; 51°58′17″N 1°00′40″E		1033419	Upload Photo	Q26284900
Constables	II	The Street			22 February 1955	TM0696434571; 51°58′16″N 1°00′42″E		1033417	Upload Photo	Q26284898
Cottage Adjoining Paper Shop to West	II	The Street			22 February 1955	TM0692334587; 51°58′16″N 1°00′40″E		1351962	Upload Photo	Q26635022
Cottage to North of the Red Lion	II	The Street			22 February 1955	TM0694134663; 51°58′19″N 1°00′41″E		1033418	Upload Photo	Q26284899
Fountain House	II	The Street			22 February 1955	TM0695434596; 51°58′17″N 1°00′41″E		1351960	Upload Photo	Q26635019
Hatters the Old House	II	The Street			22 February 1955	TM0694934625; 51°58′18″N 1°00′41″E		1194049	Upload Photo	Q26488682
Ivy Cottage and Cottage Adjoining to Right	II	The Street			22 February 1957	TM0697034649; 51°58′18″N 1°00′42″E		1033416	Upload Photo	Q26284897
K6 Telephone Kiosk by the Red Lion Public House	II	The Street			11 May 1989	TM0693734634; 51°58′18″N 1°00′41″E		1221606	Upload Photo	Q26515983
Little Court Including Railings and Gate to Front Garden	II	The Street			22 February 1955	TM0699434523; 51°58′14″N 1°00′43″E		1351961	Upload Photo	Q26635020
Moss Cottage	II	The Street			29 May 1987	TM0691634590; 51°58′16″N 1°00′39″E		1194133	Upload Photo	Q26488765
Railings and Gates to Front Gardens of Constables and Five Firs	II	The Street			29 May 1987	TM0696334559; 51°58′15″N 1°00′42″E		1194077	Upload Photo	Q26488709
Stour	II	The Street			17 September 1986	TM0694534509; 51°58′14″N 1°00′41″E		1194193	Upload Photo	Q26488824
Stour Cottage	II	The Street			22 February 1955	TM0692234556; 51°58′15″N 1°00′40″E		1285819	Upload Photo	Q26574481
The Chemist	II	The Street			22 February 1955	TM0699734685; 51°58′19″N 1°00′44″E		1033415	Upload Photo	Q26284896
The Court	II	The Street			22 February 1955	TM0699834591; 51°58′16″N 1°00′44″E		1194064	Upload Photo	Q26488696
The Gables	II*	The Street			22 February 1955	TM0695834733; 51°58′21″N 1°00′42″E		1285872	Upload Photo	Q17534209
The Red Lion	II	The Street	pub		22 February 1955	TM0693434648; 51°58′18″N 1°00′40″E		1194113	The Red Lion More images	Q26488743
War Memorial	II	The Street	war memorial		12 December 2000	TM0701834427; 51°58′11″N 1°00′44″E		1389147	War Memorial More images	Q26668590
West Lodge Stables	II	The Street			22 February 1955	TM0691734538; 51°58′15″N 1°00′39″E		1033421	Upload Photo	Q26284903
Wren Cottage	II	The Street			22 February 1955	TM0700234695; 51°58′20″N 1°00′44″E		1285875	Upload Photo	Q26574532
Orvis Croft	II	White Horse Road			22 February 1955	TM0818534290; 51°58′05″N 1°01′45″E		1033422	Upload Photo	Q26284904
Woodgates Farmhouse	II	Woodgates Road			29 May 1987	TM0755036067; 51°59′03″N 1°01′16″E		1194209	Upload Photo	Q26488839

== See also ==
- Grade I listed buildings in Suffolk
- Grade II* listed buildings in Suffolk

== Sources ==
- Bettely, James; Pevsner, Nikolaus (2015) [1961], Suffolk: West, The Buildings of England, New Haven and London: Yale University Press, ISBN 978-0-300-19655-9
