= Listed buildings in Hadleigh, Suffolk =

Historic structures in Suffolk, England

Hadleigh is a town and civil parish in the Babergh District of Suffolk, England. It contains 245 listed buildings that are recorded in the National Heritage List for England. Of these four are grade I, 26 are grade II* and 215 are grade II.

This list is based on the information retrieved online from Historic England.

== Key ==
Grade	Criteria
I	Buildings that are of exceptional interest
II*	Particularly important buildings of more than special interest
II	Buildings that are of special interest

== Listing ==
Name	Grade	Location	Type	Completed (Note: The date given is the date used by Historic England as significant for the initial building or that of an important part in the structure's description.)	Date designated	Grid ref. (Note: The grid reference is based on the British national grid reference system, sometimes known as OSGB36, used by the Ordnance Survey.) Geo-coordinates	Notes	Entry number (Note: The "List Entry Number" is a unique number assigned to each listed building and scheduled monument by Historic England.)	Image	Wikidata
Barn to the East of Cosford Hall	II				22 May 1972	TM0138044563; 52°03′46″N 0°56′11″E		1036868	Upload Photo	Q26288545
Cosford Hall	II				22 May 1972	TM0135644568; 52°03′46″N 0°56′10″E		1036867	Upload Photo	Q26288544
Monument to Doctor Rowland Taylor	II	Aldham Common	monument		22 May 1972	TM0373543611; 52°03′12″N 0°58′12″E		1351660	Monument to Doctor Rowland Taylor More images	Q26634742
Aldham Mill	II	Aldham Mill Hill, Ipswich, IP7 6LE, River Brett			22 May 1972	TM0244643761; 52°03′19″N 0°57′05″E		1036755	Upload Photo	Q26288433
20, Angel Street	II	20, Angel Street			22 May 1972	TM0268342675; 52°02′43″N 0°57′15″E		1351679	Upload Photo	Q26634761
24, Angel Street	II	24, Angel Street			22 May 1972	TM0268742680; 52°02′44″N 0°57′15″E		1036825	Upload Photo	Q26288499
34, 36 and 36a, Angel Street	II	34, 36 and 36a, Angel Street			22 May 1972	TM0270942692; 52°02′44″N 0°57′17″E		1036826	Upload Photo	Q26288501
The Pink House	II	49, Angel Street			26 April 1950	TM0275842759; 52°02′46″N 0°57′19″E		1036834	Upload Photo	Q26288509
51-55 Angel Street	II	51-55, Angel Street			22 May 1972	TM0278442774; 52°02′47″N 0°57′21″E		1193737	Upload Photo	Q26488381
57 and 59 Angel Street	II	57 and 59, Angel Street			22 May 1972	TM0279542783; 52°02′47″N 0°57′21″E		1036835	Upload Photo	Q26288511
58 and 60 Angel Street	II	58 and 60, Angel Street			22 May 1972	TM0280342763; 52°02′46″N 0°57′22″E		1351680	Upload Photo	Q26634762
63-67 Angel Street	II	63-67, Angel Street			26 April 1950	TM0280742792; 52°02′47″N 0°57′22″E		1193744	Upload Photo	Q26488388
66 Angel Street	II	66, Angel Street			22 May 1972	TM0283742786; 52°02′47″N 0°57′23″E		1036827	Upload Photo	Q26288502
68 Angel Street	II	68, Angel Street			22 May 1972	TM0284442790; 52°02′47″N 0°57′24″E		1351681	Upload Photo	Q26634763
69 and 71 Angel Street	II	69 and 71, Angel Street			26 April 1950	TM0281842798; 52°02′47″N 0°57′22″E		1036836	Upload Photo	Q26288512
70 Angel Street	II	70, Angel Street			22 May 1972	TM0285042794; 52°02′47″N 0°57′24″E		1036828	Upload Photo	Q26288503
72 Angel Street	II	72, Angel Street			22 May 1972	TM0285642798; 52°02′47″N 0°57′24″E		1036829	Upload Photo	Q26288504
73-79 Angel Street	II	73-79, Angel Street			22 May 1972	TM0282842806; 52°02′47″N 0°57′23″E		1351683	Upload Photo	Q26634765
76 Angel Street	II	76, Angel Street			22 May 1972	TM0286242801; 52°02′47″N 0°57′25″E		1351682	Upload Photo	Q26634764
78-88 Angel Street	II	78-88, Angel Street			22 May 1972	TM0287442809; 52°02′48″N 0°57′25″E		1036830	Upload Photo	Q26288505
85a and 87 Angel Street	II	85a and 87, Angel Street			22 May 1972	TM0286042829; 52°02′48″N 0°57′25″E		1286028	Upload Photo	Q26574668
89 and 91 Angel Street	II	89 and 91, Angel Street			22 May 1972	TM0286842834; 52°02′48″N 0°57′25″E		1036837	Upload Photo	Q26288513
Eight Bells Inn	II	90, Angel Street			22 May 1972	TM0289742819; 52°02′48″N 0°57′27″E		1036831	Upload Photo	Q26288506
94 and 96 Angel Street	II	94 and 96, Angel Street			22 May 1972	TM0291642832; 52°02′48″N 0°57′28″E		1036832	Upload Photo	Q26288507
95, 97 and 99 Angel Street	II*	95, 97 and 99, Angel Street			26 April 1950	TM0289542853; 52°02′49″N 0°57′27″E		1193765	Upload Photo	Q17533813
Mathouse	II	98 and 100, Angel Street			26 April 1950	TM0296242855; 52°02′49″N 0°57′30″E		1036833	Upload Photo	Q26288508
101 Angel Street	II	101, Angel Street			22 May 1972	TM0291042854; 52°02′49″N 0°57′27″E		1036838	Upload Photo	Q26288514
111-115 Angel Street	II	111-115, Angel Street			22 May 1972	TM0294142868; 52°02′49″N 0°57′29″E		1351684	Upload Photo	Q26634766
145, Angel Street	II	145, Angel Street			22 May 1972	TM0302442908; 52°02′51″N 0°57′33″E		1285993	Upload Photo	Q26574637
147, Angel Street	II	147, Angel Street			22 May 1972	TM0304242919; 52°02′51″N 0°57′34″E		1036839	Upload Photo	Q26288515
149 and 151, Angel Street	II	149 and 151, Angel Street			26 April 1950	TM0305442922; 52°02′51″N 0°57′35″E		1351685	149 and 151, Angel Street More images	Q26634767
1-5, Benton Street	II	1-5, Benton Street			22 May 1972	TM0282742184; 52°02′27″N 0°57′22″E		1285999	1-5, Benton Street More images	Q26574643
11, Benton Street	II	11, Benton Street			22 May 1972	TM0283642164; 52°02′27″N 0°57′22″E		1036840	11, Benton Street More images	Q26288516
13-17, Benton Street	II	13-17, Benton Street			22 May 1972	TM0283942155; 52°02′26″N 0°57′22″E		1193780	13-17, Benton Street	Q26488425
28, 30 and 32, Benton Street	II	28, 30 and 32, Benton Street			26 April 1950	TM0285042088; 52°02′24″N 0°57′23″E		1351689	28, 30 and 32, Benton Street More images	Q26634771
29, Benton Street	II	29, Benton Street			26 April 1950	TM0285442123; 52°02′25″N 0°57′23″E		1036841	29, Benton Street More images	Q26288517
31-35, Benton Street	II	31-35, Benton Street			26 April 1950	TM0285942118; 52°02′25″N 0°57′23″E	1351686 II 31-35, BENTON STREET Hadleigh 20260525 0002.jpg	1351686	Upload Photo	Q26634768
37-41, Benton Street	II	37-41, Benton Street			22 May 1972	TM0286442104; 52°02′25″N 0°57′23″E		1193796	37-41, Benton Street More images	Q26488442
43, Benton Street	II	43, Benton Street			22 May 1972	TM0287542084; 52°02′24″N 0°57′24″E		1036842	Upload Photo	Q26288519
69 and 71, Benton Street	II	69 and 71, Benton Street			26 April 1950	TM0290641969; 52°02′20″N 0°57′25″E		1351687	Upload Photo	Q26634769
70, Benton Street	II	70, Benton Street			22 May 1972	TM0289541952; 52°02′20″N 0°57′25″E		1193844	Upload Photo	Q26488488
Sideways	II	72, Benton Street			22 May 1972	TM0290241939; 52°02′19″N 0°57′25″E		1036846	Upload Photo	Q26288523
73 and 75, Benton Street	II	73 and 75, Benton Street			26 April 1950	TM0291941962; 52°02′20″N 0°57′26″E		1036843	Upload Photo	Q26288520
77-81, Benton Street	II*	77-81, Benton Street			26 April 1950	TM0293941936; 52°02′19″N 0°57′27″E		1193819	Upload Photo	Q17533825
Front Wall of Number 81	II	81, Benton Street			22 May 1972	TM0294441917; 52°02′19″N 0°57′27″E		1351688	Upload Photo	Q26634770
86, Benton Street	II	86, Benton Street			22 May 1972	TM0294141883; 52°02′17″N 0°57′27″E		1351690	Upload Photo	Q26634772
Garden Wall North, East and South of Number 90 (the Manse)	II	East And South Of Number 90 (the Manse), Benton Street			22 May 1972	TM0297241855; 52°02′17″N 0°57′29″E		1351709	Upload Photo	Q26634788
Outbuilding at Rear South of Number 90 (the Manse)	II	90, Benton Street			22 May 1972	TM0294841840; 52°02′16″N 0°57′27″E		1036803	Upload Photo	Q26288479
The Manse	II*	90, Benton Street			26 April 1950	TM0295241858; 52°02′17″N 0°57′27″E		1351708	Upload Photo	Q17534599
92 and 94 Benton Street	II*	92 and 94, Benton Street			26 April 1950	TM0299741818; 52°02′15″N 0°57′30″E		1036804	92 and 94 Benton Street More images	Q17533120
96-100 Benton Street	II	96-100, Benton Street			22 May 1972	TM0301241800; 52°02′15″N 0°57′30″E		1036805	Upload Photo	Q26288480
102-108 Benton Street	II	102-108, Benton Street			22 May 1972	TM0302041784; 52°02′14″N 0°57′31″E		1351710	Upload Photo	Q26634789
109-113 Benton Street	II	109-113, Benton Street			22 May 1972	TM0298641859; 52°02′17″N 0°57′29″E		1193827	Upload Photo	Q26488469
110-118 Benton Street	II	110-118, Benton Street			26 April 1950	TM0304841750; 52°02′13″N 0°57′32″E		1036806	Upload Photo	Q26288481
124 and 126, Benton Street	II	124 and 126, Benton Street			26 April 1950	TM0313241594; 52°02′08″N 0°57′36″E		1036807	Upload Photo	Q26288483
125 and 127 Benton Street	II	125 and 127, Benton Street			22 May 1972	TM0305141776; 52°02′14″N 0°57′32″E		1036845	Upload Photo	Q26288522
130-134, Benton Street	II	130-134, Benton Street			22 May 1972	TM0315841564; 52°02′07″N 0°57′38″E		1036808	Upload Photo	Q26288484
Barn of Priory Farm	II	Benton Street			22 May 1972	TM0307541681; 52°02′11″N 0°57′34″E		1351711	Upload Photo	Q26634790
Falcon Inn	II	Benton Street			22 May 1972	TM0289541998; 52°02′21″N 0°57′25″E		1193805	Upload Photo	Q26488450
King's Arms Inn	II	Benton Street	house		26 April 1950	TM0299841848; 52°02′16″N 0°57′30″E		1036844	King's Arms Inn More images	Q26288521
The Manor	II	Benton Street			22 May 1972	TM0314241675; 52°02′11″N 0°57′37″E		1193833	Upload Photo	Q26488475
1, Bridge Street	II	1, Bridge Street			22 May 1972	TM0248342836; 52°02′49″N 0°57′05″E		1036810	Upload Photo	Q26288486
2, Bridge Street	II	2, Bridge Street			22 May 1972	TM0248742854; 52°02′49″N 0°57′05″E		1036814	2, Bridge Street More images	Q26288488
Outbuilding next to and to East of number 2	II	2, Bridge Street			22 May 1972	TM0249842851; 52°02′49″N 0°57′06″E		1036815	Outbuilding next to and to East of number 2	Q26288489
11 and 13, Bridge Street	II*	11 and 13, Bridge Street	building		26 April 1950	TM0239642836; 52°02′49″N 0°57′00″E		1036811	11 and 13, Bridge Street More images	Q17533134
Sun Court	II*	12-16, Bridge Street			26 April 1950	TM0233842975; 52°02′54″N 0°56′58″E		1193958	Sun Court More images	Q17533873
15, Bridge Street	II*	15, Bridge Street	building		26 April 1950	TM0238842839; 52°02′49″N 0°57′00″E		1036812	15, Bridge Street More images	Q17533147
21, Bridge Street	II*	21, Bridge Street			26 April 1950	TM0229742953; 52°02′53″N 0°56′55″E		1193934	21, Bridge Street More images	Q17533860
23, Bridge Street	II	23, Bridge Street			22 May 1972	TM0228542975; 52°02′54″N 0°56′55″E		1036813	Upload Photo	Q26288487
28-34, Bridge Street	II	28-34, Bridge Street, IP7 6DB			22 May 1972	TM0228443009; 52°02′55″N 0°56′55″E		1351672	Upload Photo	Q26634754
38 and 40, Bridge Street	II	38 and 40, Bridge Street			22 May 1972	TM0227343024; 52°02′55″N 0°56′54″E		1193972	Upload Photo	Q26488612
Myholme	II	42, Bridge Street			26 April 1950	TM0226543035; 52°02′56″N 0°56′54″E		1036816	Upload Photo	Q26288491
44, Bridge Street	II	44, Bridge Street			22 May 1972	TM0224043053; 52°02′56″N 0°56′53″E		1351673	Upload Photo	Q26634755
Bridge Over the River Brett	II	Bridge Street, River Brett	bridge		22 May 1972	TM0234542884; 52°02′51″N 0°56′58″E		1036809	Bridge Over the River Brett More images	Q26288485
Malthouse Adjoining Number 23	II	Bridge Street			22 May 1972	TM0225942970; 52°02′54″N 0°56′54″E		1193944	Upload Photo	Q26488583
White Hart Inn	II*	Bridge Street	inn		26 April 1950	TM0222643053; 52°02′56″N 0°56′52″E		1193977	White Hart Inn More images	Q17533894
Wall on North Boundary of Grounds of the Castle	II	Castle Road			22 May 1972	TM0193543083; 52°02′58″N 0°56′37″E		1036817	Upload Photo	Q26288492
2, Church Street	II	2, Church Street			22 May 1972	TM0264742500; 52°02′38″N 0°57′13″E		1285893	Upload Photo	Q26574550
3 and 5, Church Street	II	3 and 5, Church Street			22 May 1972	TM0265742478; 52°02′37″N 0°57′13″E		1351674	3 and 5, Church Street More images	Q26634756
4, Church Street	II	4, Church Street			26 April 1950	TM0263642498; 52°02′38″N 0°57′12″E		1036819	4, Church Street More images	Q26288494
6, Church Street	II	6, Church Street			26 April 1950	TM0262342491; 52°02′38″N 0°57′12″E		1351675	Upload Photo	Q26634757
8, Church Street	II	8, Church Street	house		26 April 1950	TM0261242489; 52°02′38″N 0°57′11″E		1194021	8, Church Street More images	Q26488658
Shrub End	II	9 and 11, Church Street			26 April 1950	TM0262542463; 52°02′37″N 0°57′12″E		1036818	Shrub End More images	Q26288493
K6 Telephone Kiosk Outside the Old Post Office	II	Church Street			1 September 1987	TM0263742479; 52°02′37″N 0°57′12″E		1036716	K6 Telephone Kiosk Outside the Old Post Office More images	Q26288397
Post Office	II	Church Street			22 May 1972	TM0264342473; 52°02′37″N 0°57′13″E		1193982	Post Office More images	Q26488621
Church of St Mary	I	Church Walk	church building		26 April 1950	TM0258442469; 52°02′37″N 0°57′09″E		1036820	Church of St Mary More images	Q7594546
Deanery	II*	Church Walk	building		22 May 1972	TM0253642452; 52°02′36″N 0°57′07″E		1194061	Deanery More images	Q17533914
Deanery Tower	I	Church Walk	tower		26 April 1950	TM0254542442; 52°02′36″N 0°57′07″E		1194031	Deanery Tower More images	Q17542227
Front Wall Adjoining and to West of the Guildhall	II	Church Walk			22 May 1972	TM0257142414; 52°02′35″N 0°57′09″E		1036822	Upload Photo	Q26288496
Front Wall of Garden of Deanery Lodge	II	Church Walk			22 May 1972	TM0252542488; 52°02′38″N 0°57′06″E		1194068	Upload Photo	Q26488700
Front Wall of Garden of Deanery to North	II	Church Walk			22 May 1972	TM0253542467; 52°02′37″N 0°57′07″E		1351677	Upload Photo	Q26634759
Guildhall	I	Church Walk	city hall		26 April 1950	TM0259342421; 52°02′35″N 0°57′10″E		1194046	Guildhall More images	Q17542234
Old Bakehouse in Grounds of Guildhall to Southwest	II	Church Walk			22 May 1972	TM0258042398; 52°02′35″N 0°57′09″E		1036821	Upload Photo	Q26288495
Wall on West Side of Churchyard South of Deanery Tower	II	Church Walk			22 May 1972	TM0255342426; 52°02′36″N 0°57′08″E		1351676	Upload Photo	Q26634758
Coram Farmhouse	II	Coram Street			5 June 1978	TM0040642257; 52°02′33″N 0°55′15″E		1351746	Upload Photo	Q26634819
Coram Street Farmhouse	II	Coram Street			22 May 1972	TM0086242645; 52°02′45″N 0°55′40″E		1036824	Upload Photo	Q26288498
Friars Hall Farmhouse	II	Coram Street			22 May 1972	TM0165442841; 52°02′50″N 0°56′22″E		1194074	Upload Photo	Q26488706
River View	II	Corks Lane			22 May 1972	TM0227442935; 52°02′52″N 0°56′54″E		1036823	Upload Photo	Q26288497
The Cottage	II	Corks Lane			22 May 1972	TM0225042937; 52°02′52″N 0°56′53″E		1351678	Upload Photo	Q26634760
1, Duke Street	II	1, Duke Street			22 May 1972	TM0270742335; 52°02′32″N 0°57′16″E		1351698	Upload Photo	Q26634780
2, Duke Street	II	2, Duke Street			26 April 1950	TM0263942330; 52°02′32″N 0°57′12″E		1036783	Upload Photo	Q26288462
4-8 Duke Street	II	4-8, Duke Street			22 May 1972	TM0263142325; 52°02′32″N 0°57′12″E		1351700	Upload Photo	Q26634782
9, Duke Street	II	9, Duke Street			22 May 1972	TM0267442328; 52°02′32″N 0°57′14″E		1036781	Upload Photo	Q26288460
11, Duke Street	II	11, Duke Street			22 May 1972	TM0266542321; 52°02′32″N 0°57′13″E		1351699	Upload Photo	Q26634781
Toppesfield Bridge	II*	Duke Street	road bridge		26 April 1950	TM0257442147; 52°02′27″N 0°57′08″E		1036780	Toppesfield Bridge More images	Q17533059
Wilson's Malthouse	II	Duke Street			22 May 1972	TM0262842281; 52°02′31″N 0°57′11″E		1036782	Upload Photo	Q26288461
Cemetery Lodge	II	Friars Road			30 March 1999	TM0205442952; 52°02′53″N 0°56′43″E		1113275	Upload Photo	Q26407155
1, George Street	II	1, George Street			26 April 1950	TM0269042507; 52°02′38″N 0°57′15″E		1194115	1, George Street More images	Q26488744
3 and 5, George Street	II	3 and 5, George Street			26 April 1950	TM0270642515; 52°02′38″N 0°57′16″E		1036790	Upload Photo	Q26288466
11 and 13, George Street	II	11 and 13, George Street			22 May 1972	TM0278142566; 52°02′40″N 0°57′20″E		1285836	Upload Photo	Q26574497
15, George Street	II	15, George Street			22 May 1972	TM0279642577; 52°02′40″N 0°57′21″E		1036791	Upload Photo	Q26288467
The Old House	II	19 and 21, George Street			26 April 1950	TM0280642586; 52°02′40″N 0°57′21″E		1036792	Upload Photo	Q26288468
22-26, George Street	II*	22-26, George Street			26 April 1950	TM0282742581; 52°02′40″N 0°57′22″E		1351701	Upload Photo	Q17534574
23, George Street	II	23, George Street			22 May 1972	TM0281242591; 52°02′41″N 0°57′22″E		1194123	Upload Photo	Q26488754
25-27 and 29, George Street	II	25-27 and 29, George Street, Ipswich, IP7 5BD			22 May 1972	TM0281842596; 52°02′41″N 0°57′22″E		1036793	Upload Photo	Q26288469
28, George Street	II*	28, George Street			26 April 1950	TM0284042579; 52°02′40″N 0°57′23″E		1036785	Upload Photo	Q17533069
31 and 33, George Street	II	31 and 33, George Street			22 May 1972	TM0283642613; 52°02′41″N 0°57′23″E		1194128	Upload Photo	Q26488760
35 and 37, George Street	II	35 and 37, George Street			22 May 1972	TM0285242625; 52°02′42″N 0°57′24″E		1351702	Upload Photo	Q26634783
39-45, George Street	II	39-45, George Street			26 April 1950	TM0286442634; 52°02′42″N 0°57′25″E		1036794	Upload Photo	Q26288470
40 and 42, George Street	II	40 and 42, George Street			26 April 1950	TM0295542669; 52°02′43″N 0°57′29″E		1036787	Upload Photo	Q26288464
47 and 49, George Street	II	47 and 49, George Street			22 May 1972	TM0287342640; 52°02′42″N 0°57′25″E		1194139	Upload Photo	Q26488770
48, George Street	II*	48, George Street			26 April 1950	TM0302842685; 52°02′43″N 0°57′33″E		1036788	Upload Photo	Q17533094
83-87, George Street	II	83-87, George Street			22 May 1972	TM0296442686; 52°02′43″N 0°57′30″E		1036795	Upload Photo	Q26288471
Cock Inn	II	89, George Street	inn		26 April 1950	TM0298842698; 52°02′44″N 0°57′31″E		1351703	Cock Inn More images	Q26634784
Tudor House	II	91, George Street			26 April 1950	TM0300542703; 52°02′44″N 0°57′32″E		1194153	Upload Photo	Q26488784
93-99, George Street	II	93-99, George Street			26 April 1950	TM0301842705; 52°02′44″N 0°57′33″E		1036796	Upload Photo	Q26288472
109, George Street	II	109, George Street			22 May 1972	TM0304842717; 52°02′44″N 0°57′34″E		1285814	Upload Photo	Q26574476
111, George Street	II	111, George Street			26 April 1950	TM0306842725; 52°02′45″N 0°57′35″E		1351704	Upload Photo	Q26634785
Baptist Chapel	II	George Street			22 May 1972	TM0281642554; 52°02′39″N 0°57′22″E		1036784	Upload Photo	Q26288463
Chapel to Almshouses	II	George Street			26 April 1950	TM0317942778; 52°02′46″N 0°57′41″E		1036797	Upload Photo	Q26288473
East House	II*	George Street			26 April 1950	TM0287742615; 52°02′41″N 0°57′25″E		1036786	Upload Photo	Q17533082
Methodist Chapel	II	George Street			22 May 1972	TM0305442691; 52°02′43″N 0°57′35″E		1036789	Upload Photo	Q26288465
2, High Street	II	2, High Street			26 April 1950	TM0280742235; 52°02′29″N 0°57′21″E		1194179	2, High Street More images	Q26488809
3 and 5, High Street	II	3 and 5, High Street			22 May 1972	TM0275742225; 52°02′29″N 0°57′18″E		1194334	Upload Photo	Q26488961
6, High Street	II	6, High Street			22 May 1972	TM0278742281; 52°02′31″N 0°57′20″E		1036798	6, High Street More images	Q26288475
7, High Street	II	7, High Street			22 May 1972	TM0277442246; 52°02′29″N 0°57′19″E		1351694	7, High Street More images	Q26634776
8, High Street	II	8, High Street			22 May 1972	TM0278742287; 52°02′31″N 0°57′20″E		1194183	8, High Street More images	Q26488814
9, High Street	II	9, High Street			22 May 1972	TM0276642253; 52°02′30″N 0°57′19″E		1036775	9, High Street More images	Q26288455
10 and 12, High Street	II	10 and 12, High Street			26 April 1950	TM0277542304; 52°02′31″N 0°57′19″E		1351705	10 and 12, High Street More images	Q26634786
11, High Street	II	11, High Street			22 May 1972	TM0276842260; 52°02′30″N 0°57′19″E		1194341	11, High Street More images	Q26488968
14, High Street	II	14, High Street			22 May 1972	TM0277042313; 52°02′32″N 0°57′19″E		1036799	14, High Street More images	Q26288476
15, High Street	II	15, High Street			26 April 1950	TM0275142276; 52°02′30″N 0°57′18″E		1036776	15, High Street More images	Q26288456
16 and 18, High Street	II	16 and 18, High Street			26 April 1950	TM0276742318; 52°02′32″N 0°57′19″E		1194202	16 and 18, High Street More images	Q26488831
17 and 19, High Street	II	17 and 19, High Street			22 May 1972	TM0275542298; 52°02′31″N 0°57′18″E		1194344	17 and 19, High Street More images	Q26488971
20, High Street	II	20, High Street			22 May 1972	TM0276442333; 52°02′32″N 0°57′19″E		1351706	20, High Street More images	Q26634787
21 and 23, High Street	II	21 and 23, High Street			22 May 1972	TM0275142306; 52°02′31″N 0°57′18″E		1351695	21 and 23, High Street More images	Q26634777
22-26, High Street	II	22-26, High Street			22 May 1972	TM0276242337; 52°02′32″N 0°57′19″E		1285798	22-26, High Street More images	Q26574462
25 and 27, High Street	II	25 and 27, High Street			22 May 1972	TM0274542318; 52°02′32″N 0°57′18″E		1036777	Upload Photo	Q26288458
28, High Street	II	28, High Street			22 May 1972	TM0275342354; 52°02′33″N 0°57′18″E		1036800	Upload Photo	Q26288477
Police Station	II	29, High Street			22 May 1972	TM0272842353; 52°02′33″N 0°57′17″E		1351696	Police Station More images	Q26634778
30, High Street	II	30, High Street			22 May 1972	TM0274642361; 52°02′33″N 0°57′18″E		1036801	Upload Photo	Q26288478
31, High Street	II	31, High Street			22 May 1972	TM0271942373; 52°02′34″N 0°57′16″E		1036778	Upload Photo	Q26288459
32, High Street	II	32, High Street			22 May 1972	TM0274542374; 52°02′34″N 0°57′18″E		1285802	Upload Photo	Q26574465
33, High Street	II	33, High Street			22 May 1972	TM0271442386; 52°02′34″N 0°57′16″E		1194355	33, High Street More images	Q26488982
35, High Street	II	35, High Street			22 May 1972	TM0271142393; 52°02′34″N 0°57′16″E		1351697	Upload Photo	Q26634779
37 and 39, High Street	II	37 and 39, High Street			22 May 1972	TM0270742402; 52°02′35″N 0°57′16″E		1285751	37 and 39, High Street More images	Q26574415
Barclays Bank	II*	40, High Street			26 April 1950	TM0272542421; 52°02′35″N 0°57′17″E		1351707	Barclays Bank More images	Q17534587
Bank House and the White Lion Hotel	II*	42 and 44, High Street	hotel		26 April 1950	TM0271642428; 52°02′35″N 0°57′16″E		1036802	Bank House and the White Lion Hotel More images	Q17533107
45 and 47, High Street	II*	45 and 47, High Street			26 April 1950	TM0268442443; 52°02′36″N 0°57′15″E		1036779	45 and 47, High Street More images	Q17533047
46 and 48, High Street	II*	46 and 48, High Street	building		26 April 1950	TM0270542444; 52°02′36″N 0°57′16″E		1036757	46 and 48, High Street More images	Q17533032
49, High Street	II*	49, High Street			26 April 1950	TM0267942450; 52°02′36″N 0°57′14″E		1036735	49, High Street More images	Q17532985
50, High Street	II	50, High Street			22 May 1972	TM0270142455; 52°02′36″N 0°57′16″E		1036758	50, High Street More images	Q26288436
51, High Street	II	51, High Street			26 April 1950	TM0267442454; 52°02′36″N 0°57′14″E		1351717	51, High Street More images	Q26634796
George Inn	II	52, High Street	inn		26 April 1950	TM0269642464; 52°02′37″N 0°57′15″E		1351728	George Inn More images	Q26634807
53, High Street	II	53, High Street			26 April 1950	TM0267142463; 52°02′37″N 0°57′14″E		1036736	53, High Street More images	Q26288415
54, High Street	II	54, High Street			26 April 1950	TM0269142475; 52°02′37″N 0°57′15″E		1036759	54, High Street More images	Q26288438
55, High Street	II	55, High Street			26 April 1950	TM0266642479; 52°02′37″N 0°57′14″E		1351718	55, High Street More images	Q26634797
56 and 58, High Street	II	56 and 58, High Street			22 May 1972	TM0268742485; 52°02′37″N 0°57′15″E		1351729	56 and 58, High Street More images	Q26634808
57 and 59, High Street	II	57 and 59, High Street			22 May 1972	TM0264842507; 52°02′38″N 0°57′13″E		1036737	57 and 59, High Street More images	Q26288416
60, High Street	II	60, High Street	building		22 May 1972	TM0267242505; 52°02′38″N 0°57′14″E		1036761	60, High Street More images	Q26288440
62-66, High Street	I	62-66, High Street	building		26 April 1950	TM0266242524; 52°02′39″N 0°57′14″E		1351730	62-66, High Street More images	Q17542501
65, High Street	II	65, High Street			22 May 1972	TM0263242524; 52°02′39″N 0°57′12″E		1351719	65, High Street More images	Q26634798
67-71, High Street	II	67-71, High Street			22 May 1972	TM0262842537; 52°02′39″N 0°57′12″E		1036739	67-71, High Street More images	Q26288418
68, High Street	II	68, High Street			26 April 1950	TM0265942541; 52°02′39″N 0°57′14″E		1036762	68, High Street More images	Q26288441
72 and 74, High Street	II	72 and 74, High Street			22 May 1972	TM0266142568; 52°02′40″N 0°57′14″E		1351731	72 and 74, High Street More images	Q26634809
73-77, High Street	II	73-77, High Street			22 May 1972	TM0261342556; 52°02′40″N 0°57′11″E		1351720	Upload Photo	Q26634799
76, High Street	II	76, High Street			22 May 1972	TM0264242572; 52°02′40″N 0°57′13″E		1036763	76, High Street More images	Q26288442
78 and 80, High Street	II	78 and 80, High Street			22 May 1972	TM0263942583; 52°02′41″N 0°57′13″E		1036764	78 and 80, High Street More images	Q26288443
79-83, High Street	II*	79-83, High Street			26 April 1950	TM0258442575; 52°02′40″N 0°57′10″E		1036740	79-83, High Street More images	Q17532998
82, High Street	II	82, High Street			8 January 1970	TM0263542590; 52°02′41″N 0°57′12″E		1285788	82, High Street More images	Q26574452
84, High Street	II	84, High Street			26 April 1950	TM0262242585; 52°02′41″N 0°57′12″E		1036765	Upload Photo	Q26288444
85, High Street	II	85, High Street			22 May 1972	TM0258742588; 52°02′41″N 0°57′10″E		1036741	85, High Street More images	Q26288419
86 and 88, High Street	II	86 and 88, High Street			22 May 1972	TM0261742605; 52°02′41″N 0°57′11″E		1036766	86 and 88, High Street More images	Q26288445
87, High Street	II	87, High Street			22 May 1972	TM0258742596; 52°02′41″N 0°57′10″E		1351721	87, High Street More images	Q26634800
89, High Street	II	89, High Street			26 April 1950	TM0257142603; 52°02′41″N 0°57′09″E		1036742	89, High Street More images	Q26288421
91 and 93 High Street	II	91 and 93, High Street			26 April 1950	TM0256342623; 52°02′42″N 0°57′09″E		1194454	91 and 93 High Street More images	Q17533976
96, High Street	II	96, High Street			22 May 1972	TM0258942649; 52°02′43″N 0°57′10″E		1036767	96, High Street More images	Q26288446
97 and 99, High Street	II*	97 and 99, High Street	building		26 April 1950	TM0255042649; 52°02′43″N 0°57′08″E		1036744	97 and 99, High Street More images	Q17533010
Cherry Tree Cafe	II	98, High Street			22 May 1972	TM0258242656; 52°02′43″N 0°57′10″E		1036768	Upload Photo	Q26288448
100, High Street	II	100, High Street			22 May 1972	TM0258142664; 52°02′43″N 0°57′10″E		1194288	100, High Street More images	Q26488915
101, High Street	II	101, High Street			26 April 1950	TM0253742670; 52°02′43″N 0°57′07″E		1194462	101, High Street More images	Q26489087
102, 102a and 102b, High Street	II	102, 102a and 102b, High Street			22 May 1972	TM0258242672; 52°02′43″N 0°57′10″E		1036769	102, 102a and 102b, High Street More images	Q26288449
Taviton House	II	103, High Street			26 April 1950	TM0253242676; 52°02′44″N 0°57′07″E		1036745	Taviton House More images	Q26288424
104, High Street	II	104, High Street, Ipswich, IP7 5EL			26 April 1950	TM0255742698; 52°02′44″N 0°57′09″E		1285760	104, High Street More images	Q26574424
Ashwood	II	104A, High Street, IP7 5EL			26 April 1950	TM0256042692; 52°02′44″N 0°57′09″E		1036770	Ashwood More images	Q26288450
105, High Street	II	105, High Street			26 April 1950	TM0252342685; 52°02′44″N 0°57′07″E		1194465	105, High Street More images	Q26489090
106, High Street	II	106, High Street, Ipswich, IP7 5EL			26 April 1950	TM0255642708; 52°02′45″N 0°57′09″E		1036771	106, High Street More images	Q26288451
Sun Court	II*	107, High Street			26 April 1950	TM0252142695; 52°02′44″N 0°57′07″E		1036746	Upload Photo	Q17533020
108 and 110, High Street	II*	108 and 110, High Street	building		26 April 1950	TM0254542725; 52°02′45″N 0°57′08″E		1194306	108 and 110, High Street More images	Q17533939
111 and 113, High Street	II	111 and 113, High Street			22 May 1972	TM0251242725; 52°02′45″N 0°57′06″E		1036747	111 and 113, High Street More images	Q26288425
114, High Street	II	114, High Street			26 April 1950	TM0254242753; 52°02′46″N 0°57′08″E		1036772	114, High Street More images	Q26288452
116, High Street	II	116, High Street			26 April 1950	TM0254542763; 52°02′46″N 0°57′08″E		1194315	116, High Street More images	Q26488942
117 and 119, High Street	II	117 and 119, High Street			22 May 1972	TM0250742749; 52°02′46″N 0°57′06″E		1285683	117 and 119, High Street More images	Q26574354
120 and 122, High Street	II	120 and 122, High Street			26 April 1950	TM0253042780; 52°02′47″N 0°57′07″E		1036773	120 and 122, High Street More images	Q26288453
121, High Street	II	121, High Street			22 May 1972	TM0250842759; 52°02′46″N 0°57′06″E		1036748	121, High Street More images	Q26288426
123-129, High Street	II	123-129, High Street			22 May 1972	TM0249742787; 52°02′47″N 0°57′06″E		1036749	123-129, High Street More images	Q26288427
124 and 126, High Street	II*	124 and 126, High Street	building		26 April 1950	TM0252342800; 52°02′48″N 0°57′07″E		1194322	124 and 126, High Street More images	Q17533951
128, High Street	II	128, High Street			22 May 1972	TM0251942815; 52°02′48″N 0°57′07″E		1351693	128, High Street More images	Q26634775
Tring House	II	130, High Street			22 May 1972	TM0251642829; 52°02′49″N 0°57′07″E		1036774	Tring House More images	Q26288454
131, High Street	II	131, High Street			22 May 1972	TM0249242816; 52°02′48″N 0°57′05″E		1194477	131, High Street More images	Q26489102
133, High Street	II	133, High Street			22 May 1972	TM0249242831; 52°02′49″N 0°57′05″E		1351722	Upload Photo	Q26634801
Groves Garage	II	High Street			22 May 1972	TM0274042332; 52°02′32″N 0°57′17″E		1194348	Groves Garage More images	Q26488975
King's Head Inn	II	High Street	inn		26 April 1950	TM0261042628; 52°02′42″N 0°57′11″E		1194279	King's Head Inn More images	Q26488906
Milestone Obelisk Adjacent to Number 55 and at the Junction with Church Street	II	High Street	milestone		22 May 1972	TM0266742487; 52°02′37″N 0°57′14″E		1036738	Milestone Obelisk Adjacent to Number 55 and at the Junction with Church Street More images	Q26288417
Premises Occupied by Tooks (wing on Return Rear of Number 56 Facing George Street)	II	High Street			22 May 1972	TM0269742497; 52°02′38″N 0°57′15″E		1036760	Premises Occupied by Tooks (wing on Return Rear of Number 56 Facing George Street) More images	Q26288439
The War Memorial	II	High Street	war memorial		25 August 2000	TM0279242204; 52°02′28″N 0°57′20″E		1381824	The War Memorial More images	Q26661908
Tye House	II	High Street			26 April 1950	TM0255742642; 52°02′43″N 0°57′08″E		1036743	Tye House	Q26288422
Holbeck's Cottage	II	Layham Road			22 May 1972	TM0262541859; 52°02′17″N 0°57′10″E		1285654	Upload Photo	Q26574328
The Lawns	II	3, Market Place			22 May 1972	TM0266042386; 52°02′34″N 0°57′13″E		1036750	Upload Photo	Q26288428
6 and 8, Market Place	II	6 and 8, Market Place			26 April 1950	TM0264542414; 52°02′35″N 0°57′13″E		1194509	Upload Photo	Q26489131
Ancient Walls North and East Toppersfield Hall	II	Market Place			22 May 1972	TM0258142380; 52°02′34″N 0°57′09″E		1194519	Upload Photo	Q26489140
Congregational Church	II	Market Place			22 May 1972	TM0264342351; 52°02′33″N 0°57′12″E		1036751	Upload Photo	Q26288429
Corn Exchange	II	Market Place	corn exchange		22 May 1972	TM0261742413; 52°02′35″N 0°57′11″E		1351724	Corn Exchange More images	Q26634803
Pump at South West Corner of Town Hall	II	Market Place			22 May 1972	TM0259542378; 52°02′34″N 0°57′10″E		1036753	Upload Photo	Q26288431
Ram Inn	II	Market Place	inn		22 May 1972	TM0260242368; 52°02′34″N 0°57′10″E		1285659	Ram Inn More images	Q26574333
Sunday School and Meeting Hall (formerly Congregational Day School)	II	Market Place			22 May 1972	TM0261942348; 52°02′33″N 0°57′11″E		1036752	Upload Photo	Q26288430
Toppesfield Hall (urban District Council Offices)	II	Market Place			22 May 1972	TM0254842341; 52°02′33″N 0°57′07″E		1036754	Upload Photo	Q26288432
Town Hall	II	Market Place	city hall		22 May 1972	TM0260242389; 52°02′34″N 0°57′10″E		1194514	Town Hall More images	Q26489136
Wing to East of Ram Inn	II	Market Place			22 May 1972	TM0261342375; 52°02′34″N 0°57′11″E		1351723	Upload Photo	Q26634802
Peyton Hall	II	Peyton Hall Lane			26 April 1950	TM0216943798; 52°03′20″N 0°56′51″E		1351725	Upload Photo	Q26634804
Walls Both Bordering the Road and Within the Site at Samsons Motorworks	II	Place Farm			17 May 2005	TM0326943055; 52°02′55″N 0°57′47″E		1408083	Upload Photo	Q26675973
Pond Hall	II	Pond Hall Road			26 April 1950	TM0516741877; 52°02′14″N 0°59′24″E		1194559	Upload Photo	Q26489180
5, Pound Lane	II	5, Pound Lane			22 May 1972	TM0257042551; 52°02′40″N 0°57′09″E		1194568	5, Pound Lane More images	Q26489188
Hadleigh School	II	Pound Lane			22 May 1972	TM0250642513; 52°02′38″N 0°57′05″E		1351726	Upload Photo	Q26634805
1-9, Queen Street	II	1-9, Queen Street			22 May 1972	TM0260342524; 52°02′39″N 0°57′11″E		1036756	1-9, Queen Street More images	Q26288434
2-10, Queen Street	II	2-10, Queen Street			22 May 1972	TM0259542553; 52°02′40″N 0°57′10″E		1351727	2-10, Queen Street More images	Q26634806
Benton End House	II*	Raydon Road	house		26 April 1950	TM0333941358; 52°02′00″N 0°57′47″E		1194592	Benton End House More images	Q17534014
Outbuildings Including Granary of Benton End House to the South East of the House	II	Raydon Road			22 May 1972	TM0336041339; 52°01′59″N 0°57′48″E		1194597	Upload Photo	Q26489216
2, Station Road	II	2, Station Road			22 May 1972	TM0282042192; 52°02′28″N 0°57′21″E		1036713	2, Station Road More images	Q26288394
Former Hadleigh Railway Station	II	Station Road	railway station		20 October 1988	TM0313342171; 52°02′27″N 0°57′38″E		1351747	Former Hadleigh Railway Station More images	Q5637943
Kerseys Building	II	Station Road			22 May 1972	TM0322242161; 52°02′26″N 0°57′42″E		1036714	Upload Photo	Q26288395
Malthouse Range to West of the Store and Kerseys Building	II	Station Road			22 May 1972	TM0314942206; 52°02′28″N 0°57′39″E		1351745	Upload Photo	Q26634818
The Store	II	Station Road			22 May 1972	TM0317842210; 52°02′28″N 0°57′40″E		1285628	Upload Photo	Q26574305
Stoneleigh	II	5 and 7, Stone Street			22 May 1972	TM0186043662; 52°03′16″N 0°56′34″E		1036715	Upload Photo	Q26288396
Primrose Cottage	II	Stone Street			26 April 1950	TM0182243686; 52°03′17″N 0°56′32″E		1194614	Upload Photo	Q26489232

== See also ==
- Grade I listed buildings in Suffolk
- Grade II* listed buildings in Suffolk

== Sources ==
- Bettely, James; Pevsner, Nikolaus (2015) [1961], Suffolk: West, The Buildings of England, New Haven and London: Yale University Press, ISBN 978-0-300-19655-9
