= Listed buildings in Thorpe Morieux =

Civil Parish in Suffolk, England

Thorpe Morieux is a village and civil parish in the Babergh District of Suffolk, England. It contains 14 listed buildings that are recorded in the National Heritage List for England. Of these one is grade I, one is grade II* and twelve are grade II.

This list is based on the information retrieved online from Historic England.

== Key ==
Grade	Criteria
I	Buildings that are of exceptional interest
II*	Particularly important buildings of more than special interest
II	Buildings that are of special interest

== Listing ==
Name	Grade	Location	Type	Completed (Note: The date given is the date used by Historic England as significant for the initial building or that of an important part in the structure's description.)	Date designated	Grid ref. (Note: The grid reference is based on the British national grid reference system, sometimes known as OSGB36, used by the Ordnance Survey.) Geo-coordinates	Notes	Entry number (Note: The "List Entry Number" is a unique number assigned to each listed building and scheduled monument by Historic England.)	Image	Wikidata
Barn to the West of the Old Rectory	II				10 July 1980	TL9397853418; 52°08′42″N 0°50′01″E		1182565	Upload Photo	Q26477810
Church of St Mary the Virgin	I		church building		23 January 1958	TL9435353351; 52°08′39″N 0°50′20″E		1351578	Church of St Mary the Virgin More images	Q17542493
Flemings	II				10 July 1980	TL9246252112; 52°08′02″N 0°48′38″E		1182574	Upload Photo	Q26477819
Grove Farmhouse	II				4 July 1986	TL9462854663; 52°09′21″N 0°50′37″E		1351610	Upload Photo	Q26634696
Newsons Farmhouse	II				21 December 1995	TL9328654899; 52°09′31″N 0°49′27″E		1272984	Upload Photo	Q26562777
Pink Cottage	II				10 July 1980	TL9414453482; 52°08′44″N 0°50′10″E		1037025	Upload Photo	Q26288715
Stable Block to the West of the Old Rectory	II				10 July 1980	TL9397653441; 52°08′43″N 0°50′01″E		1037027	Upload Photo	Q26288717
The Old Rectory	II				23 January 1958	TL9401653405; 52°08′41″N 0°50′03″E		1037026	Upload Photo	Q26288716
Thorpe Hall	II*		house		23 January 1958	TL9432053235; 52°08′36″N 0°50′18″E		1284474	Thorpe Hall More images	Q17534114
Moat Farm Cottage	II	Bury Road			10 July 1980	TL9421253858; 52°08′56″N 0°50′14″E		1037029	Upload Photo	Q26288719
Sunnyside	II	Bury Road			10 July 1980	TL9415753736; 52°08′52″N 0°50′11″E		1182582	Upload Photo	Q26477827
Wheelwrights	II	Bury Road			10 July 1980	TL9415453557; 52°08′46″N 0°50′10″E		1037028	Upload Photo	Q26288718
Willow Cottage	II	Bury Road			10 July 1980	TL9420154688; 52°09′23″N 0°50′15″E		1182590	Upload Photo	Q26477835
The Stone	II	Cockfield			10 July 1980	TL9259956016; 52°10′08″N 0°48′54″E		1037030	Upload Photo	Q26288721

== See also ==
- Grade I listed buildings in Suffolk
- Grade II* listed buildings in Suffolk

== Sources ==
- Bettely, James; Pevsner, Nikolaus (2015) [1961], Suffolk: West, The Buildings of England, New Haven and London: Yale University Press, ISBN 978-0-300-19655-9
