= Listed buildings in Acton, Suffolk =

Civil Parish in Suffolk, England

Acton is a village and civil parish in the Babergh District of Suffolk, England. It contains 19 listed buildings that are recorded in the National Heritage List for England. Of these one is grade I and 18 are grade II.

This list is based on the information retrieved online from Historic England.

== Key ==
Grade	Criteria
I	Buildings that are of exceptional interest
II*	Particularly important buildings of more than special interest
II	Buildings that are of special interest

== Listing ==
Name	Grade	Location	Type	Completed (Note: The date given is the date used by Historic England as significant for the initial building or that of an important part in the structure's description.)	Date designated	Grid ref. (Note: The grid reference is based on the British national grid reference system, sometimes known as OSGB36, used by the Ordnance Survey.) Geo-coordinates	Notes	Entry number (Note: The "List Entry Number" is a unique number assigned to each listed building and scheduled monument by Historic England.)	Image	Wikidata
Balsdon Hall Farmhouse	II	Bridge Street Road			22 October 1978	TL8988448427; 52°06′06″N 0°46′16″E		1351941	Upload Photo	Q26635003
Oak Cottage and Park View	II	Bull Lane, CO10 0BE			9 February 1978	TL8780045984; 52°04′49″N 0°44′21″E		1351748	Upload Photo	Q26634821
Puddledock Garden	II	Clay Hall Lane			9 February 1978	TL9012944610; 52°04′02″N 0°46′21″E		1180829	Upload Photo	Q26476147
1-4 Long Gardens	II	1-4 Long Gardens, High Street			23 March 1961	TL8926544950; 52°04′14″N 0°45′36″E		1036721	Upload Photo	Q26288402
Church of All Saints	I	High Street	church building		23 March 1961	TL8922345230; 52°04′23″N 0°45′35″E		1036718	Church of All Saints More images	Q17541735
Crown Inn	II	High Street	inn		9 February 1978	TL8922545036; 52°04′17″N 0°45′34″E		1036719	Crown Inn More images	Q26288399
Rose Cottage	II	High Street			9 February 1978	TL8924744954; 52°04′14″N 0°45′35″E		1036720	Upload Photo	Q26288401
Spe-dives	II	High Street			9 February 1978	TL8961344759; 52°04′07″N 0°45′54″E		1036723	Upload Photo	Q26288404
Spring Cottage	II	High Street			9 February 1978	TL8964344776; 52°04′08″N 0°45′56″E		1036724	Upload Photo	Q26288405
Sunflower Cottage and Lilac Cottage	II	High Street			9 February 1978	TL8979444729; 52°04′06″N 0°46′03″E		1036725	Upload Photo	Q26288406
The Pool Cottage	II	High Street			9 February 1978	TL8949444847; 52°04′10″N 0°45′48″E		1036722	Upload Photo	Q26288403
Rookery Farm	II	Lavenham Road, CO10 0BJ			10 January 1953	TL8964147039; 52°05′21″N 0°46′00″E		1036717	Upload Photo	Q26288398
Clarkes Farm Cottage	II	Newmans Green			9 February 1978	TL8796943981; 52°03′44″N 0°44′26″E		1193806	Upload Photo	Q26488451
Noil Cottage	II	Newmans Green			9 February 1978	TL8845943883; 52°03′41″N 0°44′52″E		1036726	Upload Photo	Q26288407
Post Office Row	II	1-7, Post Office Row, High Street			9 February 1978	TL8921844961; 52°04′14″N 0°45′34″E		1351749	Upload Photo	Q26634822
Slough Farmhouse	II	Slough Lane			10 January 1953	TL8997846760; 52°05′12″N 0°46′17″E		1351750	Upload Photo	Q26634823
Barn, Stable and Cartlodge at Green Farm	II	Newman's Green			3 February 1987	TL8848643878; 52°03′40″N 0°44′53″E		1234017	Upload Photo	Q26527444
1-3, Sudbury Road	II	1-3, Sudbury Road			9 February 1978	TL8919744964; 52°04′15″N 0°45′33″E		1193831	Upload Photo	Q26488473
The Old Vicarage	II	Vicarage Lane			10 January 1953	TL8943144465; 52°03′58″N 0°45′44″E		1036727	Upload Photo	Q26288408

== See also ==
- Grade I listed buildings in Suffolk
- Grade II* listed buildings in Suffolk

== Sources ==
- Bettely, James; Pevsner, Nikolaus (2015) [1961], Suffolk: West, The Buildings of England, New Haven and London: Yale University Press, ISBN 978-0-300-19655-9
