= Listed buildings in Elmsett =

Civil Parish in Suffolk, England

Elmsett is a village and civil parish in the Babergh District of Suffolk, England. It contains 17 listed buildings that are recorded in the National Heritage List for England. Of these one is grade I and 16 are grade II.

This list is based on the information retrieved online from Historic England.

== Key ==
Grade	Criteria
I	Buildings that are of exceptional interest
II*	Particularly important buildings of more than special interest
II	Buildings that are of special interest

== Listing ==
Name	Grade	Location	Type	Completed (Note: The date given is the date used by Historic England as significant for the initial building or that of an important part in the structure's description.)	Date designated	Grid ref. (Note: The grid reference is based on the British national grid reference system, sometimes known as OSGB36, used by the Ordnance Survey.) Geo-coordinates	Notes	Entry number (Note: The "List Entry Number" is a unique number assigned to each listed building and scheduled monument by Historic England.)	Image	Wikidata
Church Farm	II	Church Road			10 July 1980	TM0592647189; 52°05′05″N 1°00′15″E		1037319	Upload Photo	Q26289032
Church of St Peter	I	Church Road	church building		23 January 1958	TM0588347205; 52°05′06″N 1°00′13″E		1194594	Church of St Peter More images	Q17542256
Barn to East of Laurel Cottage	II	Flowton Road			10 July 1980	TM0606746950; 52°04′57″N 1°00′22″E		1351443	Upload Photo	Q26634550
Hill Farmhouse	II	Flowton Road			10 July 1980	TM0706246814; 52°04′51″N 1°01′14″E		1037320	Upload Photo	Q26289034
Laurel Cottage	II	Flowton Road			10 July 1980	TM0602646961; 52°04′58″N 1°00′20″E		1194605	Upload Photo	Q26489224
Redhouse Farmhouse	II	Flowton Road			23 January 1958	TM0672746924; 52°04′55″N 1°00′56″E		1194612	Upload Photo	Q26489230
Eleys Cottage	II	Hadleigh Road			10 July 1980	TM0508445789; 52°04′21″N 0°59′28″E		1037321	Upload Photo	Q26289035
Twin Gables	II	Ipswich Road			10 July 1980	TM0573446639; 52°04′48″N 1°00′04″E		1037277	Upload Photo	Q26288979
Wall Farmhouse	II	Ipswich Road			10 July 1980	TM0579646616; 52°04′47″N 1°00′07″E		1351462	Upload Photo	Q26634565
Rookery Farmhouse	II	Manor Road			10 June 1996	TM0447947462; 52°05′16″N 0°59′00″E		1268459	Upload Photo	Q26558766
Mannings Cottage	II	The Green			21 July 1981	TM0537446706; 52°04′50″N 0°59′45″E		1351609	Upload Photo	Q26634695
Wheelwright Cottages	II	The Street			10 July 1980	TM0565646656; 52°04′48″N 1°00′00″E		1351463	Upload Photo	Q26634566
Yew Tree Cottages	II	The Street			10 July 1980	TM0557646591; 52°04′46″N 0°59′55″E		1037278	Upload Photo	Q26288981
Elm Farmhouse	II	Whatfield Road			10 July 1980	TM0499946626; 52°04′48″N 0°59′25″E		1351464	Upload Photo	Q26634567
Poplar Hall Farmhouse	II	Whatfield Road			10 July 1980	TM0413846533; 52°04′46″N 0°58′40″E		1037281	Upload Photo	Q26288984
Rectory	II	Whatfield Road			23 January 1958	TM0549546692; 52°04′50″N 0°59′51″E		1037279	Upload Photo	Q26288982
The Chequers	II	Whatfield Road			10 July 1980	TM0516646593; 52°04′47″N 0°59′34″E		1037280	Upload Photo	Q26288983

== See also ==
- Grade I listed buildings in Suffolk
- Grade II* listed buildings in Suffolk

== Sources ==
- Bettely, James; Pevsner, Nikolaus (2015) [1961], Suffolk: West, The Buildings of England, New Haven and London: Yale University Press, ISBN 978-0-300-19655-9
