= Listed buildings in Brettenham, Suffolk =

Civil Parish in Suffolk, England

Brettenham is a village and civil parish in the Babergh District of Suffolk, England. It contains 24 listed buildings that are recorded in the National Heritage List for England. Of these one is grade I, two are grade II* and 21 are grade II.

This list is based on the information retrieved online from Historic England.

== Key ==
Grade	Criteria
I	Buildings that are of exceptional interest
II*	Particularly important buildings of more than special interest
II	Buildings that are of special interest

== Listing ==
Name	Grade	Location	Type	Completed (Note: The date given is the date used by Historic England as significant for the initial building or that of an important part in the structure's description.)	Date designated	Grid ref. (Note: The grid reference is based on the British national grid reference system, sometimes known as OSGB36, used by the Ordnance Survey.) Geo-coordinates	Notes	Entry number (Note: The "List Entry Number" is a unique number assigned to each listed building and scheduled monument by Historic England.)	Image	Wikidata
Chapel Hill	II				10 July 1980	TL9518953170; 52°08′32″N 0°51′04″E		1351457	Upload Photo	Q26634563
Hitcham Lodge	II				10 July 1980	TL9617552223; 52°08′01″N 0°51′54″E		1037347	Upload Photo	Q26289063
Poplars Farmhouse	II*		farmhouse		23 January 1958	TL9527052710; 52°08′17″N 0°51′07″E		1351456	Poplars Farmhouse More images	Q17534364
Old Buckenham Hall School	II*	Brettenham Park	boarding school		23 January 1958	TL9571652965; 52°08′25″N 0°51′31″E		1037349	Old Buckenham Hall School More images	Q7083554
Dove Farmhouse	II	Bury Road			23 January 1958	TL9523152852; 52°08′22″N 0°51′05″E		1351418	Upload Photo	Q26634527
West Lodges and Gates to Brettenham Park	II	Bury Road			10 July 1980	TL9539253108; 52°08′30″N 0°51′14″E		1285873	Upload Photo	Q26574530
Barn to the North of Charlie's Cottage	II	Church Road			10 July 1980	TL9670554488; 52°09′13″N 0°52′26″E		1285877	Upload Photo	Q26574534
Charlies Cottage	II	Church Road			10 July 1980	TL9670954473; 52°09′13″N 0°52′26″E		1037351	Upload Photo	Q26289066
Church of St Mary the Virgin	I	Church Road	church building		23 January 1958	TL9672654200; 52°09′04″N 0°52′27″E		1037350	Church of St Mary the Virgin More images	Q17541953
Cock Farmhouse	II	Church Road			10 July 1980	TL9667554222; 52°09′04″N 0°52′24″E		1194034	Upload Photo	Q26488669
Ryece Hall	II	Dux Street			10 July 1980	TL9572054612; 52°09′18″N 0°51′35″E		1037352	Upload Photo	Q26289068
Tudor Lodge	II	Dux Street			10 July 1980	TL9581954870; 52°09′27″N 0°51′40″E		1037353	Upload Photo	Q26289069
Walnut Tree Cottage	II	Dux Street			10 July 1980	TL9579654792; 52°09′24″N 0°51′39″E		1194042	Upload Photo	Q26488677
Church Farmhouse	II	Old School Road			23 January 1958	TL9680454090; 52°09′00″N 0°52′31″E		1194047	Upload Photo	Q26488681
Crownings	II	Old School Road			10 July 1980	TL9726854140; 52°09′01″N 0°52′55″E		1037354	Upload Photo	Q26289070
Francis House	II	Old School Road			10 July 1980	TL9754354226; 52°09′03″N 0°53′10″E		1194062	Upload Photo	Q26488694
The Poplars	II	Old School Road			13 August 1987	TL9739454130; 52°09′01″N 0°53′02″E		1234805	Upload Photo	Q26528185
8 and 9, the Street	II	8 and 9, The Street			10 July 1980	TL9656154003; 52°08′58″N 0°52′18″E		1037356	Upload Photo	Q26289073
23 and 24, the Street	II	23 and 24, The Street			10 July 1980	TL9625253625; 52°08′46″N 0°52′01″E		1037357	Upload Photo	Q26289075
Brewers Cottage	II	The Street			10 July 1980	TL9582553557; 52°08′44″N 0°51′38″E		1351419	Upload Photo	Q26634528
Pound Farmhouse	II	The Street			23 January 1958	TL9540453221; 52°08′34″N 0°51′15″E		1194086	Upload Photo	Q26488717
Rose Farmhouse	II	The Street			10 July 1980	TL9582053637; 52°08′47″N 0°51′38″E		1194075	Upload Photo	Q26488707
Sparrows Pond	II	The Street			10 July 1980	TL9656654060; 52°08′59″N 0°52′18″E		1037355	Upload Photo	Q26289071
Thatched House	II	The Street			10 July 1980	TL9644853873; 52°08′53″N 0°52′11″E		1194069	Upload Photo	Q26488701

== See also ==
- Grade I listed buildings in Suffolk
- Grade II* listed buildings in Suffolk

== Sources ==
- Bettely, James; Pevsner, Nikolaus (2015) [1961], Suffolk: West, The Buildings of England, New Haven and London: Yale University Press, ISBN 978-0-300-19655-9
