= Listed buildings in Wattisham =

Civil Parish in Suffolk, England

Wattisham is a village and civil parish in the Babergh District of Suffolk, England. It contains 21 listed buildings that are recorded in the National Heritage List for England. Of these one is grade II* and 20 are grade II.

This list is based on the information retrieved online from Historic England.

== Key ==
Grade	Criteria
I	Buildings that are of exceptional interest
II*	Particularly important buildings of more than special interest
II	Buildings that are of special interest

== Listing ==
Name	Grade	Location	Type	Completed (Note: The date given is the date used by Historic England as significant for the initial building or that of an important part in the structure's description.)	Date designated	Grid ref. (Note: The grid reference is based on the British national grid reference system, sometimes known as OSGB36, used by the Ordnance Survey.) Geo-coordinates	Notes	Entry number (Note: The "List Entry Number" is a unique number assigned to each listed building and scheduled monument by Historic England.)	Image	Wikidata
Ailsed Barn at Ngr Tm 013 5145	II				24 October 1997	TM0104351425; 52°07′28″N 0°56′08″E		1031511	Upload Photo	Q26282890
Linked Barns Approximately 40 Metres North East of Wattisham Hall	II				24 October 1997	TM0108351357; 52°07′26″N 0°56′10″E		1031512	Upload Photo	Q26282891
Box Tree Cottage	II				10 July 1980	TM0125451686; 52°07′37″N 0°56′19″E		1284451	Upload Photo	Q26573218
Box Tree Farmhouse	II				10 July 1980	TM0125551631; 52°07′35″N 0°56′19″E		1351579	Upload Photo	Q26634667
Corner Cottage	II				10 July 1980	TM0121451480; 52°07′30″N 0°56′17″E		1182608	Upload Photo	Q26477853
Bay Tree Farmhouse	II	Bildeston Road			10 July 1980	TM0067751320; 52°07′26″N 0°55′48″E		1351580	Upload Photo	Q26634668
Clayhill Farm	II	Clayhill Lane			20 May 2005	TL9977451312; 52°07′26″N 0°55′01″E		1393786	Upload Photo	Q26672929
Edleigh	II	Crowcroft Road			10 July 1980	TM0144051502; 52°07′30″N 0°56′29″E		1182613	Upload Photo	Q26477859
Rose Cottage the Firs	II	Crowcroft Road			10 July 1980	TM0146451499; 52°07′30″N 0°56′30″E		1037032	Upload Photo	Q26288723
The Smithy	II	Crowcroft Road			10 July 1980	TM0149551428; 52°07′28″N 0°56′31″E		1284459	Upload Photo	Q26573225
Baptist Chapel	II	Hitcham Road	church building		10 July 1980	TM0098852007; 52°07′47″N 0°56′06″E		1182650	Baptist Chapel More images	Q2912422
The Castle	II	Hitcham Road			10 July 1980	TM0093151981; 52°07′47″N 0°56′03″E		1351582	Upload Photo	Q26634670
The Pheasantry	II	Hitcham Road, Ipswich, IP7 7LA			10 July 1980	TM0119051698; 52°07′37″N 0°56′16″E		1037031	Upload Photo	Q26288722
Church of St Nicholas	II*	The Green	church building		23 January 1958	TM0098251376; 52°07′27″N 0°56′04″E		1037033	Church of St Nicholas More images	Q17533227
Manor Cottage	II	The Green			10 July 1980	TM0101851485; 52°07′30″N 0°56′07″E		1351581	Upload Photo	Q26634669
The Cottage	II	The Green			10 July 1980	TM0105851511; 52°07′31″N 0°56′09″E		1037034	Upload Photo	Q26288725
Wattisham Hall	II	The Green			23 January 1958	TM0104651314; 52°07′25″N 0°56′08″E		1284430	Upload Photo	Q26573202
Ware Cottages	II	Ware Road			10 July 1980	TM0169852197; 52°07′53″N 0°56′44″E		1284440	Upload Photo	Q26573210
Cottage Farm Cottage	II	Wattisham Stone			25 January 1993	TM0036651138; 52°07′20″N 0°55′32″E		1036978	Upload Photo	Q26288655
Primrose Cottage	II	Wattisham Stone			10 July 1980	TM0033751188; 52°07′22″N 0°55′30″E		1037035	Upload Photo	Q26288726
Stone Cottage and Hilbre Cottage	II	Wattisham Stone			10 July 1980	TM0036451208; 52°07′22″N 0°55′32″E		1182669	Upload Photo	Q26477911

== See also ==
- Grade I listed buildings in Suffolk
- Grade II* listed buildings in Suffolk

== Sources ==
- Bettely, James; Pevsner, Nikolaus (2015) [1961], Suffolk: West, The Buildings of England, New Haven and London: Yale University Press, ISBN 978-0-300-19655-9
