= Listed buildings in Pinewood, Suffolk =

Civil Parish in Suffolk, England

Pinewood is a village and civil parish in the Babergh District of Suffolk, England. It contains one grade II listed building that are recorded in the National Heritage List for England.

This list is based on the information retrieved online from Historic England.

== Key ==
Grade	Criteria
I	Buildings that are of exceptional interest
II*	Particularly important buildings of more than special interest
II	Buildings that are of special interest

== Listing ==
Name	Grade	Location	Type	Completed (Note: The date given is the date used by Historic England as significant for the initial building or that of an important part in the structure's description.)	Date designated	Grid ref. (Note: The grid reference is based on the British national grid reference system, sometimes known as OSGB36, used by the Ordnance Survey.) Geo-coordinates	Notes	Entry number (Note: The "List Entry Number" is a unique number assigned to each listed building and scheduled monument by Historic England.)	Image	Wikidata
Belstead House	II				7 March 1988	TM1315742156; 52°02′13″N 1°06′23″E		1036928	Upload Photo	Q26288602

== See also ==
- Grade I listed buildings in Suffolk
- Grade II* listed buildings in Suffolk

== Sources ==
- Bettely, James; Pevsner, Nikolaus (2015) [1961], Suffolk: West, The Buildings of England, New Haven and London: Yale University Press, ISBN 978-0-300-19655-9
