= Listed buildings in Tattingstone =

Civil Parish in Suffolk, England

Tattingstone is a village and civil parish in the Babergh District of Suffolk, England. It contains 20 listed buildings that are recorded in the National Heritage List for England. Of these two are grade II* and 18 are grade II.

This list is based on the information retrieved online from Historic England.

== Key ==
Grade	Criteria
I	Buildings that are of exceptional interest
II*	Particularly important buildings of more than special interest
II	Buildings that are of special interest

== Listing ==
Name	Grade	Location	Type	Completed (Note: The date given is the date used by Historic England as significant for the initial building or that of an important part in the structure's description.)	Date designated	Grid ref. (Note: The grid reference is based on the British national grid reference system, sometimes known as OSGB36, used by the Ordnance Survey.) Geo-coordinates	Notes	Entry number (Note: The "List Entry Number" is a unique number assigned to each listed building and scheduled monument by Historic England.)	Image	Wikidata
Cragpit Farm Cottage	II	Ipswich Road (a137)			30 October 1990	TM1309237732; 51°59′50″N 1°06′10″E		1180437	Upload Photo	Q26475675
Cragpit Farmhouse	II	Ipswich Road (a137)			30 October 1990	TM1334537859; 51°59′53″N 1°06′23″E		1033391	Upload Photo	Q26284875
Lodge Cottages	II	1, 2 and 3, Church Road			30 October 1990	TM1380137083; 51°59′28″N 1°06′45″E		1180411	Upload Photo	Q26475641
30 and 31, Church Road	II	30 and 31, Church Road			22 February 1955	TM1355637167; 51°59′31″N 1°06′33″E		1033389	Upload Photo	Q26284872
Ayre Lodge	II	Church Road	gatehouse		22 February 1955	TM1376736966; 51°59′24″N 1°06′43″E		1033388	Ayre Lodge More images	Q26284871
Barn Adjacent to Road and Approximately 10 Metres South of Pond Hall Farmhouse	II	Church Road	barn		30 October 1990	TM1373736879; 51°59′21″N 1°06′41″E		1351984	Barn Adjacent to Road and Approximately 10 Metres South of Pond Hall Farmhouse More images	Q26635041
Cast Iron Railings Enclosing the Churchyard to North (church Road)	II	Church Road			30 October 1990	TM1360437152; 51°59′30″N 1°06′35″E		1180371	Upload Photo	Q26475589
Church of St Mary	II*	Church Road	church building		22 May 1955	TM1360437143; 51°59′30″N 1°06′35″E		1351983	Church of St Mary More images	Q17534738
Garden Wall Attached to Eastern Face of Tattingstone Place	II	Church Road			30 October 1990	TM1400536798; 51°59′18″N 1°06′55″E		1180425	Upload Photo	Q26475658
Pond Hall Farmhouse	II	Church Road	farmhouse		30 October 1990	TM1373036915; 51°59′22″N 1°06′41″E		1285484	Pond Hall Farmhouse More images	Q26574174
St Mary's Hospital	II	Church Road			30 October 1990	TM1360037275; 51°59′34″N 1°06′35″E		1285485	Upload Photo	Q26574175
Stables/cartlodge Approximately Metres North West of St Mary's Hospital	II	Church Road			30 October 1990	TM1355937322; 51°59′36″N 1°06′33″E		1033390	Upload Photo	Q26284873
Tattingstone Place	II	Church Road			22 February 1955	TM1392236777; 51°59′18″N 1°06′51″E		1351985	Upload Photo	Q26635042
The Walk	II	Lemons Hill			30 October 1990	TM1370237918; 51°59′55″N 1°06′42″E		1351986	Upload Photo	Q26635043
Road Farmhouse	II	Main Road			30 October 1990	TM1396438661; 52°00′18″N 1°06′57″E		1180444	Upload Photo	Q26475685
The Tattingstone Wonder	II*	The Wonder	folly		22 February 1955	TM1391336282; 51°59′02″N 1°06′49″E		1033392	The Tattingstone Wonder More images	Q7688415
Ceduna Cosy Nook	II	White Horse Hill			30 October 1990	TM1364338238; 52°00′05″N 1°06′40″E		1033393	Upload Photo	Q26284876
Inn Sign in Front (south) of White Horse Inn	II	White Horse Hill			30 October 1990	TM1363538272; 52°00′06″N 1°06′39″E		1351987	Upload Photo	Q26635044
Pump Approximately 6 Metres South of White Horse Inn	II	White Horse Hill			30 October 1990	TM1363138268; 52°00′06″N 1°06′39″E		1285444	Upload Photo	Q26574137
White Horse Inn	II	White Horse Hill	inn		30 October 1990	TM1363538279; 52°00′07″N 1°06′39″E		1180457	White Horse Inn More images	Q26475703

== See also ==
- Grade I listed buildings in Suffolk
- Grade II* listed buildings in Suffolk

== Sources ==
- Bettely, James; Pevsner, Nikolaus (2015) [1961], Suffolk: West, The Buildings of England, New Haven and London: Yale University Press, ISBN 978-0-300-19655-9
