= Listed buildings in Great Cornard =

Civil Parish in Suffolk, England

Great Cornard is a village and civil parish in the Babergh District of Suffolk, England. It contains 27 listed buildings that are recorded in the National Heritage List for England. Of these two are grade I, one is grade II* and 24 are grade II.

This list is based on the information retrieved online from Historic England.

== Key ==
Grade	Criteria
I	Buildings that are of exceptional interest
II*	Particularly important buildings of more than special interest
II	Buildings that are of special interest

== Listing ==
Name	Grade	Location	Type	Completed (Note: The date given is the date used by Historic England as significant for the initial building or that of an important part in the structure's description.)	Date designated	Grid ref. (Note: The grid reference is based on the British national grid reference system, sometimes known as OSGB36, used by the Ordnance Survey.) Geo-coordinates	Notes	Entry number (Note: The "List Entry Number" is a unique number assigned to each listed building and scheduled monument by Historic England.)	Image	Wikidata
Abbas Hall	I		English country house		16 April 1971	TL9009740408; 52°01′46″N 0°46′11″E		1180619	Abbas Hall More images	Q4663753
120, 122 and 124, Bures Road	II	120, 122 and 124, Bures Road			9 February 1978	TL8837539919; 52°01′32″N 0°44′39″E		1036667	Upload Photo	Q26288349
Brook House	II	Bures Road			9 February 1978	TL8854539344; 52°01′14″N 0°44′47″E		1351762	Upload Photo	Q26634834
The Kings Head Inn	II	Bures Road			9 February 1978	TL8838239974; 52°01′34″N 0°44′40″E		1351761	Upload Photo	Q26634833
The Red House	II	Bures Road			9 February 1978	TL8837939895; 52°01′32″N 0°44′40″E		1180656	Upload Photo	Q26475947
Maldon Grey Inn	II	Cats Lane			9 February 1978	TL8854141336; 52°02′18″N 0°44′51″E		1180345	Upload Photo	Q26475555
Church of St Andrew	I	Church Road	church building		23 March 1961	TL8833040401; 52°01′48″N 0°44′38″E		1180669	Church of St Andrew More images	Q17542104
The Old Rectory	II	Church Road			9 February 1978	TL8846940406; 52°01′48″N 0°44′45″E		1351780	Upload Photo	Q26634850
Kiln Farm	II	Crab Lane			9 July 1998	TL8977239990; 52°01′33″N 0°45′53″E		1375633	Upload Photo	Q26656396
Barn at Greys Hall	II	Greys Hall Corner			9 February 1978	TL9086939535; 52°01′17″N 0°46′49″E		1036625	Upload Photo	Q26288310
Greys Hall	II	Greys Hall Corner			9 February 1978	TL9079539563; 52°01′18″N 0°46′46″E		1036624	Upload Photo	Q26288309
Greys Hall Cottage	II	Greys Hall Corner			9 February 1978	TL9082639616; 52°01′20″N 0°46′47″E		1351781	Upload Photo	Q26634851
Little Greys	II	Greys Hall Corner			9 February 1978	TL9089639840; 52°01′27″N 0°46′51″E		1036626	Upload Photo	Q26288312
Grassmere Cottage	II	Joes Road			9 February 1978	TL9069740344; 52°01′43″N 0°46′42″E		1351782	Upload Photo	Q26634852
1 and 2 (mill Tye Cottage) Mill Tye	II	1 and 2 (mill Tye Cottage), Mill Tye, Sudbury, CO10 0JA			9 February 1978	TL8836039926; 52°01′33″N 0°44′39″E		1036627	Upload Photo	Q26288313
Mill House	II	Mill Tye			9 February 1978	TL8826239916; 52°01′33″N 0°44′34″E		1036628	Upload Photo	Q26288314
Corrie Hall	II	Prospect Hill			9 February 1978	TL8973239472; 52°01′16″N 0°45′50″E		1351783	Upload Photo	Q26634853
Prospect Hill Farmhouse	II	Prospect Hill			9 February 1978	TL8985239480; 52°01′16″N 0°45′56″E		1036629	Upload Photo	Q26288315
Great Cornard War Memorial	II	St Andrew's Churchyard, Church Road, CO10 0EL	war memorial		11 May 2020	TL8832040364; 52°01′47″N 0°44′37″E		1470081	Great Cornard War Memorial More images	Q94770154
Elm House	II	Upper Tye			9 February 1978	TL9050741342; 52°02′16″N 0°46′34″E		1285312	Upload Photo	Q26574016
Hundred House	II	Upper Tye			9 February 1978	TL9025641148; 52°02′10″N 0°46′21″E		1351785	Upload Photo	Q26634855
Lawn Farmhouse	II	Upper Tye			9 February 1978	TL9035841130; 52°02′09″N 0°46′26″E		1180733	Upload Photo	Q26476044
Poplars Farmhouse	II*	Upper Tye			10 January 1953	TL9030741094; 52°02′08″N 0°46′23″E		1036630	Upload Photo	Q17532869
Tye Cottage	II	Upper Tye			9 February 1978	TL9042741147; 52°02′10″N 0°46′29″E		1036631	Upload Photo	Q26288316
Cloggs Hall Farmhouse	II	Wells Hall Road			10 January 1953	TL8904240030; 52°01′35″N 0°45′15″E		1036632	Upload Photo	Q26288317
Flemings	II	Wells Hall Road			9 February 1978	TL8905840018; 52°01′35″N 0°45′15″E		1036633	Upload Photo	Q26288318
Wrongs Farmhouse	II	Wells Hall Road			9 February 1978	TL8932239812; 52°01′28″N 0°45′29″E		1180785	Upload Photo	Q26476101

== See also ==
- Grade I listed buildings in Suffolk
- Grade II* listed buildings in Suffolk

== Sources ==
- Bettely, James; Pevsner, Nikolaus (2015) [1961], Suffolk: West, The Buildings of England, New Haven and London: Yale University Press, ISBN 978-0-300-19655-9
