= Listed buildings in West Suffolk District =

There are around 2,900 listed buildings in the West Suffolk District, Suffolk, which are buildings of architectural or historic interest.

- Grade I buildings are of exceptional interest.
- Grade II* buildings are particularly important buildings of more than special interest.
- Grade II buildings are of special interest.

The lists follow Historic England’s geographical organisation, with entries grouped by county, local authority, and parish (civil and non-civil). The following lists are arranged by parish.

Parish	List of listed buildings	Grade I	Grade II*	Grade II	Total
Ampton	Listed buildings in Ampton				13
Bardwell	Listed buildings in Bardwell, Suffolk				50
Barnardiston	Listed buildings in Barnardiston				2
Barnham	Listed buildings in Barnham, Suffolk				28
Barningham	Listed buildings in Barningham, Suffolk				19
Barrow	Listed buildings in Barrow, Suffolk				23
Barton Mills	Listed buildings in Barton Mills				9
Beck Row, Holywell Row and Kenny Hill	Listed buildings in Beck Row, Holywell Row and Kenny Hill				9
Bradfield Combust with Stanningfield	Listed buildings in Bradfield Combust with Stanningfield				32
Bradfield St Clare	Listed buildings in Bradfield St Clare				11
Bradfield St George	Listed buildings in Bradfield St George				12
Brandon	Listed buildings in Brandon, Suffolk				17
Brockley	Listed buildings in Brockley, Suffolk				15
Bury St Edmunds	Listed buildings in Bury St Edmunds (western part); Listed buildings in Bury St Edmunds (eastern part)				737
Cavendish	Listed buildings in Cavendish, Suffolk				67
Cavenham	Listed buildings in Cavenham				6
Chedburgh	Listed buildings in Chedburgh				6
Chevington	Listed buildings in Chevington, Suffolk				29
Clare	Listed buildings in Clare, Suffolk				183
Coney Weston	Listed buildings in Coney Weston				19
Cowlinge	Listed buildings in Cowlinge				33
Culford	Listed buildings in Culford				15
Dalham	Listed buildings in Dalham				41
Denham	Listed buildings in Denham, St Edmundsbury				9
Denston	Listed buildings in Denston				22
Depden	Listed buildings in Depden				16
Elveden	Listed buildings in Elveden				7
Eriswell	Listed buildings in Eriswell				11
Euston	Listed buildings in Euston, Suffolk				34
Exning	Listed buildings in Exning				21
Fakenham Magna	Listed buildings in Fakenham Magna				19
Flempton	Listed buildings in Flempton				15
Fornham All Saints	Listed buildings in Fornham All Saints				21
Fornham St Genevieve	Listed buildings in Fornham St Genevieve				9
Fornham St Martin	Listed buildings in Fornham St Martin				10
Freckenham	Listed buildings in Freckenham				10
Gazeley	Listed buildings in Gazeley				9
Great Barton	Listed buildings in Great Barton				22
Great Bradley	Listed buildings in Great Bradley				7
Great Livermere	Listed buildings in Great Livermere				14
Great Thurlow	Listed buildings in Great Thurlow				25
Great Whelnetham	Listed buildings in Great Whelnetham				16
Great Wratting	Listed buildings in Great Wratting				18
Hargrave	Listed buildings in Hargrave, Suffolk				14
Haverhill (town)	Listed buildings in Haverhill, Suffolk				36
Hawkedon	Listed buildings in Hawkedon				20
Hawstead	Listed buildings in Hawstead				30
Hengrave	Listed buildings in Hengrave				21
Hepworth	Listed buildings in Hepworth, Suffolk				23
Herringswell	Listed buildings in Herringswell				8
Higham	Listed buildings in Higham, Forest Heath				6
Honington	Listed buildings in Honington, Suffolk				15
Hopton	Listed buildings in Hopton, Suffolk				20
Horringer	Listed buildings in Horringer				43
Hundon	Listed buildings in Hundon				31
Icklingham	Listed buildings in Icklingham				11
Ickworth	Listed buildings in Ickworth				14
Ingham	Listed buildings in Ingham, Suffolk				8
Ixworth	Listed buildings in Ixworth				72
Ixworth Thorpe	Listed buildings in Ixworth Thorpe				1
Kedington	Listed buildings in Kedington				34
Kentford	Listed buildings in Kentford				4
Knettishall	Listed buildings in Knettishall				3
Lackford	Listed buildings in Lackford				10
Lakenheath	Listed buildings in Lakenheath				8
Lidgate	Listed buildings in Lidgate				24
Little Bradley	Listed buildings in Little Bradley				5
Little Livermere	Listed buildings in Little Livermere				5
Little Thurlow	Listed buildings in Little Thurlow				30
Little Whelnetham	Listed buildings in Little Whelnetham				5
Little Wratting	Listed buildings in Little Wratting				4
Market Weston	Listed buildings in Market Weston				14
Mildenhall (town)	Listed buildings in Mildenhall, Suffolk				51
Moulton	Listed buildings in Moulton, Suffolk				20
Newmarket (town)	Listed buildings in Newmarket, Suffolk				109
Nowton	Listed buildings in Nowton				10
Ousden	Listed buildings in Ousden				21
Pakenham	Listed buildings in Pakenham, Suffolk				54
Poslingford	Listed buildings in Poslingford				18
Rede	Listed buildings in Rede, Suffolk				9
Risby	Listed buildings in Risby, Suffolk				23
Rushbrooke with Rougham	Listed buildings in Rushbrooke with Rougham				34
Santon Downham	Listed buildings in Santon Downham				3
Sapiston	Listed buildings in Sapiston				16
Stansfield	Listed buildings in Stansfield				29
Stanton	Listed buildings in Stanton, Suffolk				42
Stoke-by-Clare	Listed buildings in Stoke-by-Clare				44
Stradishall	Listed buildings in Stradishall				22
The Saxhams	Listed buildings in The Saxhams				31
Thelnetham	Listed buildings in Thelnetham				28
Timworth	Listed buildings in Timworth				2
Troston	Listed buildings in Troston				16
Tuddenham	Listed buildings in Tuddenham				'6
West Row	Listed buildings in West Row				9
West Stow	Listed buildings in West Stow				8
Westley	Listed buildings in Westley, Suffolk				5
Whepstead	Listed buildings in Whepstead				34
Wickhambrook	Listed buildings in Wickhambrook				60
Withersfield	Listed buildings in Withersfield				24
Wixoe	Listed buildings in Wixoe				12
Wordwell	Listed buildings in Wordwell				3
Worlington	Listed buildings in Worlington, Suffolk				11

== See also ==
- Grade I listed buildings in Suffolk
- Grade II* listed buildings in Suffolk

== Sources ==
- Bettely, James; Pevsner, Nikolaus (2015) [1961], Suffolk: West, The Buildings of England, New Haven and London: Yale University Press, ISBN 978-0-300-19655-9
