= Listed buildings in Chilton, Suffolk =

Historic structures in Suffolk, England

Chilton is a village and civil parish in the Babergh District of Suffolk, England. It contains six listed buildings that are recorded in the National Heritage List for England. Of these one is grade I, one is grade II* and four are grade II.

This list is based on the information retrieved online from Historic England.

== Key ==
Grade	Criteria
I	Buildings that are of exceptional interest
II*	Particularly important buildings of more than special interest
II	Buildings that are of special interest

== Listing ==
Name	Grade	Location	Type	Completed (Note: The date given is the date used by Historic England as significant for the initial building or that of an important part in the structure's description.)	Date designated	Grid ref. (Note: The grid reference is based on the British national grid reference system, sometimes known as OSGB36, used by the Ordnance Survey.) Geo-coordinates	Notes	Entry number (Note: The "List Entry Number" is a unique number assigned to each listed building and scheduled monument by Historic England.)	Image	Wikidata
Church of St Mary	I		church building		23 March 1961	TL8896942215; 52°02′46″N 0°45′15″E		1351732	Church of St Mary More images	Q7594302
Chilton Cottage	II	Chilton Corner			9 February 1978	TL9020743031; 52°03′11″N 0°46′22″E		1180352	Upload Photo	Q26475564
Thatch Cottage	II	Chilton Corner			9 February 1978	TL9017943031; 52°03′11″N 0°46′20″E		1036688	Upload Photo	Q26288367
1-3, Valley Road	II	1-3, Valley Road			9 February 1978	TL9022143012; 52°03′10″N 0°46′22″E		1351733	Upload Photo	Q26634810
Chilton Hall	II*	Waldingfield Road	house		10 January 1953	TL8904342716; 52°03′02″N 0°45′20″E		1036689	Chilton Hall More images	Q17532962
Garden Wall to East of Chilton Hall	II	Waldingfield Road			9 February 1978	TL8894842664; 52°03′01″N 0°45′15″E		1180362	Upload Photo	Q26475578

== See also ==
- Grade I listed buildings in Suffolk
- Grade II* listed buildings in Suffolk

== Sources ==
- Bettely, James; Pevsner, Nikolaus (2015) [1961], Suffolk: West, The Buildings of England, New Haven and London: Yale University Press, ISBN 978-0-300-19655-9
