= Listed buildings in Horringer =

Historic structures in Suffolk, England

Horringer is a village and civil parish in the West Suffolk District of Suffolk, England. It contains 43 listed buildings that are recorded in the National Heritage List for England. Of these one is grade II* and 40 are grade II.

This list is based on the information retrieved online from Historic England.

== Key ==
Grade	Criteria
I	Buildings that are of exceptional interest
II*	Particularly important buildings of more than special interest
II	Buildings that are of special interest

== Listing ==
Name	Grade	Location	Type	Completed (Note: The date given is the date used by Historic England as significant for the initial building or that of an important part in the structure's description.)	Date designated	Grid ref. (Note: The grid reference is based on the British national grid reference system, sometimes known as OSGB36, used by the Ordnance Survey.) Geo-coordinates	Notes	Entry number (Note: The "List Entry Number" is a unique number assigned to each listed building and scheduled monument by Historic England.)	Image	Wikidata
K6 Telephone Kiosk, Horringer	II	IP29 5SJ			3 September 1987	TL8254061725; 52°13′25″N 0°40′16″E		1298918	Upload Photo	Q26586357
Great Horringer Hall	II	Bury Road			25 August 1983	TL8319562578; 52°13′51″N 0°40′52″E		1280806	Upload Photo	Q26569898
Entrance Gates, Gatepiers and Railings to Ickworth Park	II	Gatepiers And Railings To Ickworth Park, The Street			25 August 1983	TL8254561963; 52°13′32″N 0°40′16″E		1205277	Upload Photo	Q26500636
Horsecroft Hall	II	Horsecroft Road			25 August 1983	TL8425161834; 52°13′26″N 0°41′46″E		1186983	Upload Photo	Q26482220
Little Horsecroft Cottage	II	Horsecroft Road			25 August 1983	TL8447961607; 52°13′18″N 0°41′58″E		1186984	Upload Photo	Q26482221
Lodge Cottage	II	Horsecroft Road			25 August 1983	TL8437362209; 52°13′38″N 0°41′53″E		1205254	Upload Photo	Q26500615
Briar Cottage	II	Ickworth Park			25 August 1983	TL8227262598; 52°13′53″N 0°40′03″E		1205255	Upload Photo	Q26500616
Little Horringer Hall and Cottages	II	Little Horringer			14 July 1955	TL8181962851; 52°14′02″N 0°39′40″E		1186985	Upload Photo	Q26482222
Horringer Manor	II	Manor Lane			25 August 1983	TL8297661971; 52°13′32″N 0°40′39″E		1298942	Upload Photo	Q26586379
The Cottage	II	Manor Lane			25 August 1983	TL8305061800; 52°13′26″N 0°40′43″E		1205261	Upload Photo	Q26500622
The Forge	II	Manor Lane			25 August 1983	TL8270862038; 52°13′34″N 0°40′25″E		1205259	Upload Photo	Q26500620
The Gables	II	Manor Lane			25 August 1983	TL8280561968; 52°13′32″N 0°40′30″E		1186986	Upload Photo	Q26482223
Meadow Cottage	II	Sharps Lane			21 February 1972	TL8288860856; 52°12′56″N 0°40′32″E		1298943	Upload Photo	Q26586380
Shrubland Lodge	II	Sharps Lane			25 August 1983	TL8286160986; 52°13′00″N 0°40′31″E		1280808	Upload Photo	Q26569900
1, 2 and 3 the Gildhall	II	1, 2 and 3 The Gildhall, The Street			21 February 1972	TL8262061903; 52°13′30″N 0°40′20″E		1186990	Upload Photo	Q26482227
The Cottage, 1 the Gildhall	II	1 The Gildhall, The Street			25 August 1983	TL8260661891; 52°13′30″N 0°40′20″E		1298946	Upload Photo	Q26586383
Weavers Cottages	II	1 and 2, The Street			14 July 1955	TL8257061803; 52°13′27″N 0°40′17″E		1186988	Upload Photo	Q26482225
3 and 4 Godfreys Cottages	II	3 and 4 Godfreys Cottages, The Street			25 August 1983	TL8251060931; 52°12′59″N 0°40′13″E		1280785	Upload Photo	Q26569877
Anne Corders Cottage	II	The Street			25 August 1983	TL8269362079; 52°13′36″N 0°40′25″E		1186992	Upload Photo	Q26482229
Ashdown Cottage	II	The Street			25 August 1983	TL8249161742; 52°13′25″N 0°40′13″E		1298911	Upload Photo	Q26586350
Cedar Cottage	II	The Street			25 August 1983	TL8254461904; 52°13′30″N 0°40′16″E		1298910	Upload Photo	Q26586349
Church of St Leonard	II*	The Street	church building		14 July 1955	TL8257862025; 52°13′34″N 0°40′18″E		1298948	Church of St Leonard More images	Q17545668
Highlands	II	The Street			14 July 1955	TL8258461836; 52°13′28″N 0°40′18″E		1186989	Upload Photo	Q26482226
Home Cottage and Little Home Cottage	II	The Street			25 August 1983	TL8260161040; 52°13′02″N 0°40′18″E		1205264	Upload Photo	Q26500624
Horringer House	II	The Street			25 August 1983	TL8252560700; 52°12′51″N 0°40′13″E		1186987	Upload Photo	Q26482224
King William Cottage the Post Office	II	The Street			25 August 1983	TL8258961884; 52°13′30″N 0°40′19″E		1298945	Upload Photo	Q26586382
Mansard House	II	The Street			25 August 1983	TL8270262091; 52°13′36″N 0°40′25″E		1298947	Upload Photo	Q26586384
Mulberry Cottage	II	The Street			25 August 1983	TL8251661819; 52°13′28″N 0°40′15″E		1205282	Upload Photo	Q26500640
Nutshell Cottage	II	The Street			25 August 1983	TL8248060849; 52°12′56″N 0°40′11″E		1298912	Upload Photo	Q26586351
Park Gates	II	The Street	architectural structure		25 August 1983	TL8253661979; 52°13′33″N 0°40′16″E		1186994	Park Gates More images	Q26482231
Pheasant Cottage	II	The Street			25 August 1983	TL8252461678; 52°13′23″N 0°40′15″E		1298944	Upload Photo	Q26586381
Primary School and School House	II	The Street			25 August 1983	TL8264362067; 52°13′35″N 0°40′22″E		1186993	Upload Photo	Q26482230
Rose Cottage	II	The Street			25 August 1983	TL8251261474; 52°13′16″N 0°40′14″E		1186996	Upload Photo	Q26482233
Street Farmhouse	II	The Street			14 July 1955	TL8253761197; 52°13′07″N 0°40′15″E		1186997	Upload Photo	Q26482234
Sycamores	II	The Street			25 August 1983	TL8252061850; 52°13′29″N 0°40′15″E		1186995	Upload Photo	Q26482232
The Beehive Public House	II	The Street	pub		25 August 1983	TL8251361498; 52°13′17″N 0°40′14″E		1205286	The Beehive Public House More images	Q26500644
The Green	II	The Street			25 August 1983	TL8269161972; 52°13′32″N 0°40′24″E		1186991	Upload Photo	Q26482228
The Laurels	II	The Street			25 August 1983	TL8251061451; 52°13′16″N 0°40′14″E		1280782	Upload Photo	Q26569874
The Cottage	II	Westley Lane			25 August 1983	TL8271162174; 52°13′39″N 0°40′26″E		1205295	Upload Photo	Q26678927
Cullums Cottage	II	Whepstead Road			25 August 1983	TL8364460870; 52°12′56″N 0°41′12″E		1298913	Upload Photo	Q26586352
Halfway House	II	Whepstead Road			25 August 1983	TL8361461007; 52°13′00″N 0°41′11″E		1186999	Upload Photo	Q26482236
Harram House	II	Whepstead Road			25 August 1983	TL8316360131; 52°12′32″N 0°40′45″E		1205296	Upload Photo	Q26500652
Hopleys Lodge	II	Whepstead Road			25 August 1983	TL8379561647; 52°13′20″N 0°41′22″E		1186998	Upload Photo	Q26482235

== See also ==
- Grade I listed buildings in Suffolk
- Grade II* listed buildings in Suffolk

== Sources ==
- Bettely, James; Pevsner, Nikolaus (2015) [1961], Suffolk: West, The Buildings of England, New Haven and London: Yale University Press, ISBN 978-0-300-19655-9
