= Listed buildings in Stanton, Suffolk =

Civil Parish in Suffolk, England

Stanton is a village and civil parish in the West Suffolk District of Suffolk, England. It contains 42 listed buildings that are recorded in the National Heritage List for England. Of these five are grade II* and 65 are grade II.

This list is based on the information retrieved online from Historic England.

== Key ==
Grade	Criteria
I	Buildings that are of exceptional interest
II*	Particularly important buildings of more than special interest
II	Buildings that are of special interest

== Listing ==
Name	Grade	Location	Type	Completed (Note: The date given is the date used by Historic England as significant for the initial building or that of an important part in the structure's description.)	Date designated	Grid ref. (Note: The grid reference is based on the British national grid reference system, sometimes known as OSGB36, used by the Ordnance Survey.) Geo-coordinates	Notes	Entry number (Note: The "List Entry Number" is a unique number assigned to each listed building and scheduled monument by Historic England.)	Image	Wikidata
Church of St John	II*	Bardwell Road	church building		14 July 1955	TL9620073752; 52°19′36″N 0°52′40″E		1031224	Church of St John More images	Q7593734
Upper Church House	II	Bardwell Road			27 September 1984	TL9617773771; 52°19′37″N 0°52′39″E		1194057	Upload Photo	Q26488690
Chare Farmhouse	II	Barningham Road			27 September 1984	TL9634674050; 52°19′46″N 0°52′48″E		1031225	Upload Photo	Q26282579
George Hill House	II	Barningham Road			27 September 1984	TL9646174250; 52°19′52″N 0°52′55″E		1285854	Upload Photo	Q26574515
Hill Farmhouse	II	Barningham Road			27 September 1984	TL9649074492; 52°20′00″N 0°52′57″E		1031226	Upload Photo	Q26282580
Dorset Cottage	II	Bury Lane			27 September 1984	TL9645873201; 52°19′18″N 0°52′52″E		1031227	Upload Photo	Q26282581
Foundry House	II	Bury Road			14 July 1955	TL9672573456; 52°19′26″N 0°53′07″E		1031228	Upload Photo	Q26282582
Gable End	II	Bury Road			27 September 1984	TL9669273458; 52°19′26″N 0°53′05″E		1194126	Upload Photo	Q26488757
Manor Farmhouse	II	Bury Road			27 September 1984	TL9658073483; 52°19′27″N 0°52′59″E		1376947	Upload Photo	Q26657452
Rose and Crown Inn	II	Bury Road	inn		14 July 1955	TL9590673198; 52°19′19″N 0°52′23″E		1194081	Rose and Crown Inn More images	Q26488712
Courtfield Tradescant Cottage	II	Bury Road (the Walks), The Walks			27 September 1984	TL9668673442; 52°19′26″N 0°53′05″E		1194144	Upload Photo	Q26488775
New Delight	II	Dale Road			27 September 1984	TL9625174522; 52°20′01″N 0°52′44″E		1194180	Upload Photo	Q26488810
Corner Cottage, Dawn Cottage and Rosley	II	Duke Street			14 July 1955	TL9665173470; 52°19′27″N 0°53′03″E		1194203	Upload Photo	Q26488832
Priory Cottage	II	Duke Street			27 September 1984	TL9657773877; 52°19′40″N 0°53′00″E		1376949	Upload Photo	Q26657454
Rose Cottage	II	Duke Street			27 September 1984	TL9647673952; 52°19′42″N 0°52′55″E		1031230	Upload Photo	Q26282585
Willow House	II	Duke Street			27 September 1984	TL9667073466; 52°19′27″N 0°53′04″E		1031229	Upload Photo	Q26282583
Stanton War Memorial	II	Junction Of The Street, St Edmundsbury, IP31 2DB			22 May 2020	TL9664273451; 52°19′26″N 0°53′03″E		1469926	Upload Photo	Q97457816
Park Farmhouse	II	Park Farm Drive			14 July 1955	TL9705472528; 52°18′56″N 0°53′22″E		1031231	Upload Photo	Q26282586
The Lodge	II	Park Farm Drive			27 September 1984	TL9673673027; 52°19′12″N 0°53′07″E		1285811	Upload Photo	Q26574473
Gayfield	II	The Chare, Lower Chare			27 September 1984	TL9562574308; 52°19′55″N 0°52′11″E		1376948	Upload Photo	Q26657453
Grundle House	II*	The Grundle			14 July 1955	TL9675173103; 52°19′15″N 0°53′08″E		1285805	Upload Photo	Q17545657
1 and 2, the Street	II	1 and 2, The Street			27 September 1984	TL9665973421; 52°19′25″N 0°53′03″E		1376969	Upload Photo	Q26657473
Beech Cottage and Ivy Cottage	II	The Street			27 September 1984	TL9668573165; 52°19′17″N 0°53′04″E		1031192	Upload Photo	Q26282544
Church of All Saints	II*	The Street	church building		14 July 1955	TL9658873443; 52°19′26″N 0°53′00″E		1376971	Church of All Saints More images	Q17545814
Jasmine Cottage	II	The Street			27 September 1984	TL9668873311; 52°19′22″N 0°53′05″E		1376970	Upload Photo	Q26657474
London House	II	The Street			27 September 1984	TL9665873446; 52°19′26″N 0°53′03″E		1376950	Upload Photo	Q26657455
Street Farmhouse	II	The Street			27 September 1984	TL9672473213; 52°19′18″N 0°53′06″E		1031191	Upload Photo	Q26282543
The Cock Inn	II	The Street	inn		27 September 1984	TL9667473360; 52°19′23″N 0°53′04″E		1031190	The Cock Inn More images	Q26282542
Barn to South of Wrenshall Farmhouse	II	Upthorpe Road			27 September 1984	TL9842672017; 52°18′37″N 0°54′34″E		1031196	Upload Photo	Q26282548
High Elm Farmhouse	II	Upthorpe Road			27 September 1984	TL9808272689; 52°19′00″N 0°54′17″E		1031195	Upload Photo	Q26282547
Knowle Lodge	II	Upthorpe Road			27 September 1984	TL9676573414; 52°19′25″N 0°53′09″E		1031193	Upload Photo	Q26282545
Mill Farmhouse	II	Upthorpe Road			27 September 1984	TL9713073272; 52°19′20″N 0°53′28″E		1031194	Upload Photo	Q26282546
Pond Farmhouse	II	Upthorpe Road			27 September 1984	TL9794672695; 52°19′00″N 0°54′10″E		1376973	Upload Photo	Q26657475
Stables to South of Wrenshall Farmhouse	II	Upthorpe Road			27 September 1984	TL9844772012; 52°18′37″N 0°54′35″E		1285708	Upload Photo	Q26574378
Upthorpe Windmill	II*	Upthorpe Road	post mill		10 June 1970	TL9713373299; 52°19′21″N 0°53′28″E		1376972	Upthorpe Windmill More images	Q7899339
Wrenshall Cottages	II	Upthorpe Road			27 September 1984	TL9851571988; 52°18′36″N 0°54′38″E		1376974	Upload Photo	Q26657476
Wrenshall Farmhouse	II	Upthorpe Road			27 September 1984	TL9840172068; 52°18′39″N 0°54′32″E		1194403	Upload Photo	Q26489027
Barn to North West of Wyken Hall	II	Wyken Road			14 December 1983	TL9648971660; 52°18′28″N 0°52′51″E		1031324	Upload Photo	Q26282680
Cart Lodge to North West of Wyken Hall	II	Wyken Road			14 December 1983	TL9651971664; 52°18′28″N 0°52′52″E		1181898	Upload Photo	Q26477182
Grindle Cottage	II	Wyken Road			27 September 1984	TL9671673107; 52°19′15″N 0°53′06″E		1031197	Upload Photo	Q26282550
The Gables	II	Wyken Road			27 September 1984	TL9666873089; 52°19′14″N 0°53′03″E		1285675	Upload Photo	Q26574348
Wyken Hall	II*	Wyken Road			14 December 1983	TL9656271606; 52°18′27″N 0°52′55″E		1031323	Wyken Hall	Q17540527

== See also ==
- Grade I listed buildings in Suffolk
- Grade II* listed buildings in Suffolk

== Sources ==
- Bettely, James; Pevsner, Nikolaus (2015) [1961], Suffolk: West, The Buildings of England, New Haven and London: Yale University Press, ISBN 978-0-300-19655-9
