= Listed buildings in Stoke-by-Clare =

Civil Parish in Suffolk, England

Stoke-by-Clare is a village and civil parish in the West Suffolk District of Suffolk, England. It contains 44 listed buildings that are recorded in the National Heritage List for England. Of these one is grade I, five are grade II* and 38 are grade II.

This list is based on the information retrieved online from Historic England.

== Key ==
Grade	Criteria
I	Buildings that are of exceptional interest
II*	Particularly important buildings of more than special interest
II	Buildings that are of special interest

== Listing ==
Name	Grade	Location	Type	Completed (Note: The date given is the date used by Historic England as significant for the initial building or that of an important part in the structure's description.)	Date designated	Grid ref. (Note: The grid reference is based on the British national grid reference system, sometimes known as OSGB36, used by the Ordnance Survey.) Geo-coordinates	Notes	Entry number (Note: The "List Entry Number" is a unique number assigned to each listed building and scheduled monument by Historic England.)	Image	Wikidata
Boyton End House	II				20 May 1974	TL7192344679; 52°04′26″N 0°30′26″E		1235380	Upload Photo	Q26528713
Burnthouse Farmhouse	II				20 May 1974	TL7336644490; 52°04′18″N 0°31′41″E		1235381	Upload Photo	Q26528714
Canham's Farmhouse	II				20 May 1974	TL7454445424; 52°04′47″N 0°32′45″E		1235383	Upload Photo	Q26528716
Church of St John the Baptist	I		church building		19 December 1955	TL7410243342; 52°03′40″N 0°32′18″E		1235153	Church of St John the Baptist More images	Q17526722
Crooks Hall	II				20 May 1974	TL7210945417; 52°04′49″N 0°30′37″E		1182379	Upload Photo	Q26477633
Stables to Stoke College	II				20 May 1974	TL7417443178; 52°03′35″N 0°32′21″E		1235154	Upload Photo	Q26528507
Stoke College	II*				19 December 1961	TL7413643168; 52°03′34″N 0°32′19″E		1265211	Upload Photo	Q7618449
Hill Farmhouse	II	Boyton End			20 May 1974	TL7180544328; 52°04′14″N 0°30′19″E		1235155	Upload Photo	Q26528508
31,32, Chapel Street	II	31, 32, Chapel Street, Stoke By Clare			20 May 1974	TL7366943484; 52°03′45″N 0°31′55″E		1235385	Upload Photo	Q26528718
43, Chapel Street	II	43, Chapel Street, Stoke By Clare			20 May 1974	TL7299943367; 52°03′42″N 0°31′20″E		1235388	Upload Photo	Q26528721
Chapel Street Farmhouse	II	Chapel Street, Stoke By Clare			20 May 1974	TL7305543420; 52°03′44″N 0°31′23″E		1235387	Upload Photo	Q26528720
The Willows	II	Chapel Street, Stoke By Clare			20 May 1974	TL7361943497; 52°03′46″N 0°31′53″E		1235386	Upload Photo	Q26528719
Virginia Cottage	II	Chapel Street, Stoke By Clare			20 May 1974	TL7355043496; 52°03′46″N 0°31′49″E		1265088	Upload Photo	Q26555712
Yew Tree Cottage and the Forge	II	Chapel Street, Stoke By Clare			20 May 1974	TL7373043454; 52°03′44″N 0°31′58″E		1235384	Upload Photo	Q26528717
7,8, School Green	II	7, 8, School Green, Stoke By Clare			20 May 1974	TL7425043697; 52°03′51″N 0°32′26″E		1235438	Upload Photo	Q26528767
9, School Green	II	9, School Green, Stoke By Clare			20 May 1974	TL7426443673; 52°03′50″N 0°32′27″E		1365754	Upload Photo	Q26647411
Vicarage	II	School Green, Stoke By Clare			20 May 1974	TL7424043612; 52°03′49″N 0°32′25″E		1235439	Upload Photo	Q26528768
Boyton End Barn Immediately South of Boyton End Farmhouse	II	Stoke By Clare			14 April 1989	TL7198044518; 52°04′20″N 0°30′28″E		1264705	Upload Photo	Q26555378
Dovecote, Stoke College	II*	Stoke College			19 December 1961	TL7402443380; 52°03′41″N 0°32′14″E		1235337	Upload Photo	Q17545515
Barn at Moor Hall	II	Stoke Road, Stoke By Clare			19 December 1961	TL7460244143; 52°04′05″N 0°32′45″E		1235440	Upload Photo	Q26528769
Cloverlea	II	Stoke Road, Stoke By Clare			20 May 1974	TL7447343924; 52°03′58″N 0°32′38″E		1235446	Upload Photo	Q26528774
Moor Hall	II	Stoke Road, Stoke By Clare			19 December 1961	TL7464344078; 52°04′03″N 0°32′47″E		1365755	Upload Photo	Q26647412
5,6, the Green (lower)	II	5, 6, The Green (lower), Stoke By Clare			20 May 1974	TL7413643662; 52°03′50″N 0°32′20″E		1235435	Upload Photo	Q26528764
7, the Green (lower)	II	7, The Green (lower), Stoke By Clare			20 May 1974	TL7413243667; 52°03′50″N 0°32′20″E		1365752	Upload Photo	Q26647409
Green Farmhouse	II*	The Green (lower), Stoke By Clare			19 December 1961	TL7415043601; 52°03′48″N 0°32′21″E		1265089	Green Farmhouse More images	Q17545596
Hainault Cottage	II	5, 6, The Green (upper)			20 May 1974	TL7416343820; 52°03′55″N 0°32′22″E		1235436	Upload Photo	Q26528765
House Approximately 20 Yards North East of Nos 5 and 6 (hainault Cottage)	II	The Green (upper), Stoke By Clare			20 May 1974	TL7419043841; 52°03′56″N 0°32′23″E		1235437	Upload Photo	Q26528766
Tudor Cottage	II	The Green (upper), Stoke By Clare			20 May 1974	TL7421843883; 52°03′57″N 0°32′25″E		1365753	Upload Photo	Q26647410
7-9, the Street	II	7-9, The Street, Stoke By Clare			19 December 1961	TL7414043561; 52°03′47″N 0°32′20″E		1235448	7-9, the Street More images	Q26528775
10-15, the Street	II	10-15, The Street, Stoke By Clare			20 May 1974	TL7409143484; 52°03′45″N 0°32′17″E		1235565	10-15, the Street More images	Q26528882
16-19 the Street	II	16-19, The Street, Stoke By Clare			19 December 1961	TL7408843418; 52°03′42″N 0°32′17″E		1265038	16-19 the Street More images	Q26555668
20, the Street	II	20, The Street			24 August 1995	TL7405443377; 52°03′41″N 0°32′15″E		1236458	Upload Photo	Q26529685
Ardath Cottage	II	The Street, Stoke By Clare			19 December 1961	TL7412743536; 52°03′46″N 0°32′19″E		1235449	Ardath Cottage More images	Q26528776
Cellarers Cottage	II*	The Street, Stoke By Clare			19 December 1961	TL7407943398; 52°03′42″N 0°32′17″E		1235566	Cellarers Cottage More images	Q17545527
Garage (w G Pryce) and House Adjoining	II	The Street, Stoke By Clare			19 December 1961	TL7415843548; 52°03′47″N 0°32′21″E		1264963	Garage (w G Pryce) and House Adjoining More images	Q26555596
Green Farm Cottage	II*	The Street, Stoke By Clare			19 December 1961	TL7414743572; 52°03′47″N 0°32′20″E		1235447	Green Farm Cottage More images	Q17545521
K6 Telephone Kiosk Opposite the Red Lion Public House	II	The Street, Stoke By Clare			15 February 1990	TL7412843506; 52°03′45″N 0°32′19″E		1236256	K6 Telephone Kiosk Opposite the Red Lion Public House More images	Q26529501
Layer Cottage	II	The Street, Stoke By Clare			19 December 1961	TL7410743452; 52°03′43″N 0°32′18″E		1235577	Layer Cottage More images	Q26528889
Lion Inn	II	The Street, Stoke By Clare	inn		19 December 1961	TL7410543504; 52°03′45″N 0°32′18″E		1235450	Lion Inn More images	Q26528777
Silver Farmhouse	II	The Street, Stoke By Clare			19 December 1961	TL7419043581; 52°03′48″N 0°32′23″E		1265003	Silver Farmhouse More images	Q26555634
Stoke House	II	The Street, Stoke By Clare			19 December 1961	TL7416643507; 52°03′45″N 0°32′21″E		1265002	Stoke House More images	Q26555633
Stoke-by-clare War Memorial	II	The Street, Stoke By Clare, Sudbury, CO10 8HW	war memorial		21 September 2021	TL7420243644; 52°03′50″N 0°32′23″E		1477163	Stoke-by-clare War Memorial More images	Q111853462
Thatchetty	II	The Street, Stoke By Clare			19 December 1961	TL7412643485; 52°03′45″N 0°32′19″E		1235642	Thatchetty More images	Q26528949
The Stores (premises Occupied by G Bean and Son)	II	The Street, Stoke By Clare			19 December 1961	TL7417243568; 52°03′47″N 0°32′22″E		1235578	The Stores (premises Occupied by G Bean and Son) More images	Q26528890

== See also ==
- Grade I listed buildings in Suffolk
- Grade II* listed buildings in Suffolk

== Sources ==
- Bettely, James; Pevsner, Nikolaus (2015) [1961], Suffolk: West, The Buildings of England, New Haven and London: Yale University Press, ISBN 978-0-300-19655-9
