= Listed buildings in Ixworth =

Historic structures in Suffolk, England

Ixworth is a village and civil parish in the West Suffolk District of Suffolk, England. It contains 72 listed buildings that are recorded in the National Heritage List for England. Of these two grade I, three are grade II* and 65 are grade II.

This list is based on the information retrieved online from Historic England.

== Key ==
Grade	Criteria
I	Buildings that are of exceptional interest
II*	Particularly important buildings of more than special interest
II	Buildings that are of special interest

== Listing ==
Name	Grade	Location	Type	Completed (Note: The date given is the date used by Historic England as significant for the initial building or that of an important part in the structure's description.)	Date designated	Grid ref. (Note: The grid reference is based on the British national grid reference system, sometimes known as OSGB36, used by the Ordnance Survey.) Geo-coordinates	Notes	Entry number (Note: The "List Entry Number" is a unique number assigned to each listed building and scheduled monument by Historic England.)	Image	Wikidata
Ixworth Abbey	I		house		14 July 1955	TL9298270435; 52°17′53″N 0°49′43″E		1031475	Ixworth Abbey More images	Q6101204
Tudor Cottage	II	Bury St Edmunds			11 July 1983	TL9314270497; 52°17′55″N 0°49′52″E		1376840	Tudor Cottage More images	Q26657354
Stable, Coachhouse and Linking Wall to the Beeches	II	Coachhouse And Linking Wall To The Beeches, High Street			5 March 1973	TL9327070531; 52°17′56″N 0°49′59″E		1181019	Upload Photo	Q26476365
Abbey Farmhouse	II	Heath Road			11 July 1983	TL9234171461; 52°18′27″N 0°49′12″E		1031476	Upload Photo	Q26282850
Barn Adjacent to Abbey Farmhouse on West	II	Heath Road			11 July 1983	TL9232571465; 52°18′27″N 0°49′11″E		1031477	Upload Photo	Q26282851
The Elms	II	7, High Street			14 July 1955	TL9315470325; 52°17′49″N 0°49′52″E		1031492	Upload Photo	Q26282869
Warrens General Store	II	9, High Street			11 July 1983	TL9316270342; 52°17′50″N 0°49′53″E		1031493	Upload Photo	Q26282870
10, High Street	II	10, High Street			11 July 1983	TL9315670293; 52°17′48″N 0°49′52″E		1376842	Upload Photo	Q26657356
Nos. 12-14, High Street	II	12-14, High Street, IP31 2HH			11 July 1983	TL9316470306; 52°17′49″N 0°49′53″E		1031479	Nos. 12-14, High Street More images	Q26282854
15, High Street	II	15, High Street			11 July 1983	TL9320070410; 52°17′52″N 0°49′55″E		1376825	Upload Photo	Q26657341
16, High Street	II	16, High Street			11 July 1983	TL9317070312; 52°17′49″N 0°49′53″E		1376843	Upload Photo	Q26657357
17, High Street	II	17, High Street			11 July 1983	TL9320270417; 52°17′52″N 0°49′55″E		1180997	Upload Photo	Q26476339
18, High Street	II	18, High Street	building		11 July 1983	TL9317370322; 52°17′49″N 0°49′53″E		1031480	18, High Street More images	Q26282855
19, High Street	II	19, High Street			11 July 1983	TL9320570425; 52°17′53″N 0°49′55″E		1031494	Upload Photo	Q26282871
20 and 22, High Street	II	20 and 22, High Street			11 July 1983	TL9318070334; 52°17′50″N 0°49′54″E		1285350	Upload Photo	Q26574049
23 and 25, High Street	II	23 and 25, High Street			11 July 1983	TL9322270455; 52°17′54″N 0°49′56″E		1181010	Upload Photo	Q26476353
24, High Street	II	24, High Street			1 June 1979	TL9318670345; 52°17′50″N 0°49′54″E		1031481	Upload Photo	Q26282857
26-30, High Street	II	26-30, High Street			11 July 1983	TL9319770366; 52°17′51″N 0°49′55″E		1376844	Upload Photo	Q26657358
Mulley's Motorways and House	II	29, High Street			11 July 1983	TL9324070484; 52°17′55″N 0°49′57″E		1376826	Upload Photo	Q26657342
32, High Street	II	32, High Street, IP31 2HH			11 July 1983	TL9320570379; 52°17′51″N 0°49′55″E		1285323	Upload Photo	Q26574026
Beech Cottage	II	35, High Street			14 July 1955	TL9325870516; 52°17′56″N 0°49′58″E		1031495	Upload Photo	Q26282873
Saddlers	II	36, High Street			11 July 1983	TL9322270412; 52°17′52″N 0°49′56″E		1031482	Upload Photo	Q26282858
40 and 42, High Street	II	40 and 42, High Street			11 July 1983	TL9324070444; 52°17′53″N 0°49′57″E		1180757	Upload Photo	Q26476070
Seamans Dairies	II	45, High Street			11 July 1983	TL9329870583; 52°17′58″N 0°50′00″E		1181027	Seamans Dairies More images	Q26476374
48, High Street	II	48, High Street			11 July 1983	TL9326870490; 52°17′55″N 0°49′59″E		1031483	Upload Photo	Q26282859
Giffords	II	51, High Street			14 July 1955	TL9332770637; 52°17′59″N 0°50′02″E		1031453	Upload Photo	Q26282825
52, High Street	II	52, High Street			11 July 1983	TL9327770512; 52°17′55″N 0°49′59″E		1285305	Upload Photo	Q26574009
53, High Street	II	53, High Street			11 July 1983	TL9333870656; 52°18′00″N 0°50′03″E		1031454	Upload Photo	Q26282826
54 and 56, High Street	II	54 and 56, High Street, St Edmundsbury, IP31 2HJ			11 July 1983	TL9328370518; 52°17′56″N 0°49′59″E		1031484	Upload Photo	Q26282860
Shambles	II	55 and 57, High Street			11 July 1983	TL9334870675; 52°18′01″N 0°50′03″E		1376829	Upload Photo	Q26657345
59, High Street	II	59, High Street			11 July 1983	TL9335870688; 52°18′01″N 0°50′04″E		1031455	Upload Photo	Q26282828
Park House	II	64, High Street			11 July 1983	TL9335170530; 52°17′56″N 0°50′03″E		1031485	Upload Photo	Q26282861
Orchard Cottage	II	66, High Street			11 July 1983	TL9330570561; 52°17′57″N 0°50′01″E		1180770	Orchard Cottage More images	Q26476086
68, High Street	II	68, High Street			11 July 1983	TL9331870582; 52°17′58″N 0°50′01″E		1031486	Upload Photo	Q26282862
70, High Street	II	70, High Street			11 July 1983	TL9332670593; 52°17′58″N 0°50′02″E		1180780	Upload Photo	Q26476096
72, High Street	II	72, High Street			11 July 1983	TL9332970599; 52°17′58″N 0°50′02″E		1031487	Upload Photo	Q26282863
Crown House	II	74, High Street			11 July 1983	TL9333870612; 52°17′59″N 0°50′02″E		1285314	Upload Photo	Q26574018
78, High Street	II	78, High Street			11 July 1983	TL9334670626; 52°17′59″N 0°50′03″E		1031488	Upload Photo	Q26282865
Church of St Mary	I	High Street	church building		3 February 1950	TL9314070390; 52°17′52″N 0°49′52″E		1180826	Church of St Mary More images	Q17526614
Hill House	II	High Street			11 July 1983	TL9338470736; 52°18′02″N 0°50′05″E		1376830	Upload Photo	Q26657346
Holmlea	II	High Street	building		11 July 1983	TL9313170293; 52°17′48″N 0°49′51″E		1376824	Holmlea More images	Q26657340
Ixworth War Memorial	II	High Street, Bury St Edmunds, IP31 2HH	war memorial		16 January 2020	TL9315270372; 52°17′51″N 0°49′52″E		1467918	Ixworth War Memorial More images	Q97450467
Office and Two Outbuildings Adjoining Cyder House	II	High Street			11 July 1983	TL9308470259; 52°17′47″N 0°49′48″E		1376841	Upload Photo	Q26657355
Priory Cottage	II	High Street			11 July 1983	TL9309870299; 52°17′49″N 0°49′49″E		1031491	Upload Photo	Q26282868
Priory Lodge and Outbuildings	II	High Street			11 July 1983	TL9302470220; 52°17′46″N 0°49′45″E		1376823	Upload Photo	Q26657339
Smithy to South of Holmlea	II	High Street			11 July 1983	TL9311570293; 52°17′49″N 0°49′50″E		1180907	Upload Photo	Q26476238
Stable to Pickerel Inn	II*	High Street			14 July 1955	TL9325670421; 52°17′52″N 0°49′58″E		1376845	Stable to Pickerel Inn More images	Q17545796
Stables to Number 78	II	High Street			11 July 1983	TL9335870633; 52°17′59″N 0°50′04″E		1031489	Upload Photo	Q26282866
The Beeches	II	High Street			14 July 1955	TL9328170552; 52°17′57″N 0°49′59″E		1031496	Upload Photo	Q26282874
The Cyder House	II	High Street			11 July 1983	TL9309770261; 52°17′47″N 0°49′49″E		1031478	Upload Photo	Q26282852
The Langridge	II	High Street			11 July 1983	TL9346870838; 52°18′06″N 0°50′10″E		1031490	Upload Photo	Q26282867
The Nook	II	High Street			14 July 1955	TL9346670829; 52°18′05″N 0°50′10″E		1180817	Upload Photo	Q26476134
The Old Vicarage	II	High Street			11 July 1983	TL9318370382; 52°17′51″N 0°49′54″E		1180987	Upload Photo	Q26476328
The Pickerel Inn	II	High Street	pub		14 July 1955	TL9323470433; 52°17′53″N 0°49′57″E		1285327	The Pickerel Inn More images	Q26574028
The Priory	II	High Street	house		11 July 1983	TL9306470304; 52°17′49″N 0°49′47″E		1180900	The Priory More images	Q26476230
The Robert Peel Guest House	II	High Street			11 July 1983	TL9314070308; 52°17′49″N 0°49′51″E		1285222	Upload Photo	Q26573933
Three Links	II	Park Yard			11 July 1983	TL9330270522; 52°17′56″N 0°50′00″E		1031456	Upload Photo	Q26282829
1 and 2, Stow Road	II	1 and 2, Stow Road			28 September 1998	TL9335070214; 52°17′46″N 0°50′02″E		1378381	Upload Photo	Q26658789
3 and 4, Stow Road	II	3 and 4, Stow Road			28 September 1998	TL9337870204; 52°17′45″N 0°50′04″E		1378382	Upload Photo	Q26658790
5 and 6, Stow Road	II	5 and 6, Stow Road			28 September 1998	TL9341170195; 52°17′45″N 0°50′05″E		1378383	Upload Photo	Q26658791
7 and 8, Stow Road	II	7 and 8, Stow Road			28 September 1998	TL9344070184; 52°17′45″N 0°50′07″E		1378384	Upload Photo	Q26658792
Barn South East to Dover House	II	Stow Road			11 July 1983	TL9317070224; 52°17′46″N 0°49′53″E		1376832	Upload Photo	Q26657348
Cross House	II	Stow Road			11 July 1983	TL9351870133; 52°17′43″N 0°50′11″E		1031457	Upload Photo	Q26282830
Dover House and Garden Wall Adjoining on West	II*	Stow Road	architectural structure		11 July 1983	TL9315770252; 52°17′47″N 0°49′52″E		1031458	Dover House and Garden Wall Adjoining on West More images	Q17540595
The Blooms	II	Stow Road			11 July 1983	TL9328270221; 52°17′46″N 0°49′59″E		1376831	Upload Photo	Q26657347
Barns to the North of Dairy Farm	II	Thetford Road			11 July 1983	TL9289571120; 52°18′16″N 0°49′40″E		1031460	Upload Photo	Q26282833
Dairy Farmhouse	II	Thetford Road			14 July 1955	TL9288971078; 52°18′14″N 0°49′40″E		1376834	Upload Photo	Q26657349
Mill Barn	II	Thetford Road			11 July 1983	TL9272071127; 52°18′16″N 0°49′31″E		1285145	Upload Photo	Q26573859
The Crown Public House	II	Thetford Road			11 July 1983	TL9323170702; 52°18′02″N 0°49′57″E		1181127	Upload Photo	Q26476467
The Round House	II	Thetford Road			11 July 1983	TL9286070996; 52°18′12″N 0°49′38″E		1181094	Upload Photo	Q26476438
The White House	II	Thetford Road			11 July 1983	TL9301870839; 52°18′06″N 0°49′46″E		1031459	Upload Photo	Q26282832
Water Mill and Mill House	II*	Thetford Road			14 July 1955	TL9274671094; 52°18′15″N 0°49′32″E		1376833	Upload Photo	Q17545785

== See also ==
- Grade I listed buildings in Suffolk
- Grade II* listed buildings in Suffolk

== Sources ==
- Bettely, James; Pevsner, Nikolaus (2015) [1961], Suffolk: West, The Buildings of England, New Haven and London: Yale University Press, ISBN 978-0-300-19655-9
