= Listed buildings in Dalham =

Historic structures in Suffolk, England

Dalham is a village and civil parish in the West Suffolk District of Suffolk, England. It contains 41 listed buildings that are recorded in the National Heritage List for England. Of these one is grade I, one is grade II* and 39 are grade II.

This list is based on the information retrieved online from Historic England.

== Key ==
Grade	Criteria
I	Buildings that are of exceptional interest
II*	Particularly important buildings of more than special interest
II	Buildings that are of special interest

== Listing ==
Name	Grade	Location	Type	Completed (Note: The date given is the date used by Historic England as significant for the initial building or that of an important part in the structure's description.)	Date designated	Grid ref. (Note: The grid reference is based on the British national grid reference system, sometimes known as OSGB36, used by the Ordnance Survey.) Geo-coordinates	Notes	Entry number (Note: The "List Entry Number" is a unique number assigned to each listed building and scheduled monument by Historic England.)	Image	Wikidata
West Gate Lodge to Dalham Hall with Gates Piers and Walling	II	Ashley Road			27 January 1972	TL7128262878; 52°14′15″N 0°30′25″E		1037695	Upload Photo	Q26289410
5 Brookside	II	5, Brookside			7 May 1954	TL7222161633; 52°13′33″N 0°31′12″E		1037697	Upload Photo	Q26289412
K6 Telephone Kiosk by General Stores	II	Brookside			11 May 1989	TL7223361671; 52°13′35″N 0°31′13″E		1351302	Upload Photo	Q26634419
The Affleck Arms Public House	II	Brookside	thatched pub		7 May 1954	TL7223661702; 52°13′36″N 0°31′13″E		1037696	The Affleck Arms Public House More images	Q26289411
1, Church Lane	II	1, Church Lane			7 May 1954	TL7224362092; 52°13′48″N 0°31′14″E		1037698	Upload Photo	Q26289413
2, Church Lane	II	2, Church Lane			26 June 1984	TL7226462055; 52°13′47″N 0°31′15″E		1037699	Upload Photo	Q26289414
5, Church Lane	II	5, Church Lane			7 May 1954	TL7228762099; 52°13′48″N 0°31′17″E		1037700	Upload Photo	Q26289415
Church of St Mary	I	Church Lane	church building		7 May 1954	TL7242962556; 52°14′03″N 0°31′25″E		1037701	Church of St Mary More images	Q17542639
Monument to General Sir James Affleck Baronet Adjacent to South Side of Church of St Mary	II	Church Lane			26 June 1984	TL7241262546; 52°14′03″N 0°31′24″E		1374814	Upload Photo	Q26655652
3 Ranges of Garden Walling with Linking Ha Ha Piers and Gates South of Dalham Hall	II	3 Ranges Of Garden Walling With Linking Ha Ha Piers And Gates South Of Dalham Hall, Dalham Hall			26 June 1984	TL7236962542; 52°14′03″N 0°31′22″E		1037702	Upload Photo	Q26289416
Dalham Hall	II	Dalham Hall	house		7 May 1954	TL7241662672; 52°14′07″N 0°31′24″E		1037703	Dalham Hall More images	Q5210851
Stables and Coach House 30m North West of Dalham Hall	II	Dalham Hall			7 May 1954	TL7238662714; 52°14′08″N 0°31′23″E		1192925	Upload Photo	Q26487595
Barn 30m North East of Dunstall Green Farmhouse	II	Dunstall Green			26 June 1984	TL7489860050; 52°12′39″N 0°33′30″E		1192944	Upload Photo	Q26487614
3, Dunstall Green Road	II	3, Dunstall Green Road			26 June 1984	TL7481960539; 52°12′55″N 0°33′27″E		1374816	Upload Photo	Q26655654
Appletree Cottage	II	Dunstall Green Road			22 April 1990	TL7473560793; 52°13′03″N 0°33′23″E		1037601	Upload Photo	Q26289318
Byway	II	Dunstall Green Road			26 June 1984	TL7475460776; 52°13′03″N 0°33′24″E		1037704	Upload Photo	Q26289417
Moat Farmhouse	II	Dunstall Green Road			26 June 1984	TL7471660581; 52°12′57″N 0°33′22″E		1192940	Upload Photo	Q26487610
Seven Elms Cottage	II	Dunstall Green Road			26 June 1984	TL7478860558; 52°12′56″N 0°33′25″E		1192936	Upload Photo	Q26487606
Snapes Farmhouse	II	Dunstall Green Road			26 June 1984	TL7482860271; 52°12′47″N 0°33′27″E		1037705	Upload Photo	Q26289418
St Francis	II	Dunstall Green Road			26 June 1984	TL7471460853; 52°13′05″N 0°33′22″E		1374815	Upload Photo	Q26655653
Malting Farmhouse	II	Gazeley Road			26 June 1984	TL7218162130; 52°13′50″N 0°31′11″E		1374817	Upload Photo	Q26655655
Malting Kiln 80m South East of Malting Farmhouse	II	Gazeley Road			26 June 1984	TL7223962063; 52°13′47″N 0°31′14″E		1286382	Upload Photo	Q26574985
End Cottage	II	Lidgate Road			26 June 1984	TL7225161472; 52°13′28″N 0°31′14″E		1037663	Upload Photo	Q26289381
Meadow Cottage	II	Lidgate Road			26 June 1984	TL7216661534; 52°13′30″N 0°31′09″E		1351294	Upload Photo	Q26634411
Robin Hill	II	Lidgate Road			26 June 1984	TL7215161483; 52°13′29″N 0°31′08″E		1037664	Upload Photo	Q26289383
2 and 4 Stores Hill	II	2 and 4, Stores Hill			7 May 1954	TL7224061722; 52°13′36″N 0°31′13″E		1351296	2 and 4 Stores Hill More images	Q26634413
Lower Mill	II*	Stores Hill	mill		7 May 1954	TL7198261665; 52°13′35″N 0°31′00″E		1037666	Lower Mill More images	Q6693616
10, the Sounds	II	10, The Sounds			27 January 1972	TL7213861176; 52°13′19″N 0°31′07″E		1037665	Upload Photo	Q26289384
12, the Sounds	II	12, The Sounds			27 January 1972	TL7216361152; 52°13′18″N 0°31′08″E		1351295	Upload Photo	Q26634412
4 the Street	II	4, The Street			7 May 1954	TL7225861652; 52°13′34″N 0°31′14″E		1351297	4 the Street More images	Q26634414
6 and 8 the Street	II	6 and 8, The Street			7 May 1954	TL7230261670; 52°13′35″N 0°31′17″E		1037668	Upload Photo	Q26289386
27, 29, 31 and 33 the Street	II	27-33, The Street, CB8 8TF			7 May 1954	TL7220261864; 52°13′41″N 0°31′12″E		1037670	Upload Photo	Q26289388
30 the Street	II	30, The Street			7 May 1954	TL7227561930; 52°13′43″N 0°31′16″E		1193083	Upload Photo	Q26487747
Woodbine Cottage	II	32, The Street			7 May 1954	TL7227161939; 52°13′43″N 0°31′16″E		1351299	Upload Photo	Q26634416
36 the Street	II	36, The Street			7 May 1954	TL7227061953; 52°13′44″N 0°31′15″E		1286301	Upload Photo	Q26574913
40, the Street	II	40, The Street			7 May 1954	TL7227962021; 52°13′46″N 0°31′16″E		1037671	Upload Photo	Q26289389
46, the Street	II	46, The Street			26 June 1984	TL7226762048; 52°13′47″N 0°31′15″E		1193125	Upload Photo	Q26487786
Dairy Farmhouse	II	The Street			7 May 1954	TL7226861632; 52°13′33″N 0°31′15″E		1037667	Upload Photo	Q26289385
Ford Cottage	II	The Street			7 May 1954	TL7228561702; 52°13′36″N 0°31′16″E		1351298	Upload Photo	Q26634415
The Heritage	II	The Street			7 May 1954	TL7227561691; 52°13′35″N 0°31′15″E		1037669	Upload Photo	Q26289387
The Old Manor	II	The Street			26 June 1984	TL7229461840; 52°13′40″N 0°31′17″E		1193036	Upload Photo	Q26487698

== See also ==
- Grade I listed buildings in Suffolk
- Grade II* listed buildings in Suffolk

== Sources ==
- Bettely, James; Pevsner, Nikolaus (2015) [1961], Suffolk: West, The Buildings of England, New Haven and London: Yale University Press, ISBN 978-0-300-19655-9
