= Listed buildings in Wickhambrook =

Civil Parish in Suffolk, England

Wickhambrook is a village and civil parish in the West Suffolk District of Suffolk, England. It contains 60 listed buildings that are recorded in the National Heritage List for England. Of these two are grade I, two are grade II* and 56 are grade II.

This list is based on the information retrieved online from Historic England.

== Key ==
Grade	Criteria
I	Buildings that are of exceptional interest
II*	Particularly important buildings of more than special interest
II	Buildings that are of special interest

== Listing ==
Name	Grade	Location	Type	Completed (Note: The date given is the date used by Historic England as significant for the initial building or that of an important part in the structure's description.)	Date designated	Grid ref. (Note: The grid reference is based on the British national grid reference system, sometimes known as OSGB36, used by the Ordnance Survey.) Geo-coordinates	Notes	Entry number (Note: The "List Entry Number" is a unique number assigned to each listed building and scheduled monument by Historic England.)	Image	Wikidata
Almshouses	II				19 December 1961	TL7531554473; 52°09′38″N 0°33′42″E		1235841	Upload Photo	Q26529132
Badmondisfield Hall	II*		house		19 December 1961	TL7473257021; 52°11′02″N 0°33′16″E		1235891	Badmondisfield Hall More images	Q17545532
Blackhorse Farmhouse	II				20 May 1974	TL7686457172; 52°11′04″N 0°35′08″E		1235867	Upload Photo	Q26529153
Brook Cottage	II				20 May 1974	TL7493754765; 52°09′48″N 0°33′23″E		1264872	Upload Photo	Q26555515
Church of All Saints	I		church building		19 December 1961	TL7534654444; 52°09′38″N 0°33′43″E		1264889	Church of All Saints More images	Q17526758
Clopton Green Farmhouse	II				20 May 1974	TL7687954332; 52°09′32″N 0°35′04″E		1235915	Upload Photo	Q26529197
Commerce House	II				19 December 1961	TL7479554736; 52°09′48″N 0°33′15″E		1235861	Upload Photo	Q26529149
Cottage at Giffords Hall	II				19 December 1961	TL7702253767; 52°09′14″N 0°35′10″E		1235865	Upload Photo	Q26529151
Gifford's Hall	I				19 December 1961	TL7708353842; 52°09′16″N 0°35′14″E		1235864	Upload Photo	Q17526734
Layham Place	II				20 May 1974	TL7481454614; 52°09′44″N 0°33′16″E		1235863	Upload Photo	Q26529150
Meadow Cottage	II				20 May 1974	TL7341653624; 52°09′13″N 0°32′00″E		1235892	Upload Photo	Q26529177
Peacocks Farmhouse	II				20 May 1974	TL7334253795; 52°09′19″N 0°31′57″E		1264845	Upload Photo	Q26555497
Rolfes Farmhouse	II				19 December 1961	TL7506554766; 52°09′48″N 0°33′29″E		1235860	Upload Photo	Q26529148
Sunnyside	II				20 May 1974	TL7528654520; 52°09′40″N 0°33′40″E		1264871	Upload Photo	Q26555514
The Old Vicarage	II				19 December 1961	TL7538754420; 52°09′37″N 0°33′46″E		1235791	Upload Photo	Q26529091
The White House	II				20 May 1974	TL7539354486; 52°09′39″N 0°33′46″E		1235792	Upload Photo	Q26529092
Tithe Barn to the Old Vicarage	II				19 December 1961	TL7540854431; 52°09′37″N 0°33′47″E		1235853	Upload Photo	Q26529142
Wickham House	II				19 December 1961	TL7735453489; 52°09′04″N 0°35′27″E		1235866	Upload Photo	Q26529152
Alderfield Hall	II	Ashfield Green			20 May 1974	TL7636456171; 52°10′32″N 0°34′40″E		1235894	Upload Photo	Q26529179
Ashfield Green Cottage	II	Ashfield Green, CB8 8UZ			20 May 1974	TL7596455778; 52°10′20″N 0°34′18″E		1235893	Upload Photo	Q26529178
Home Farmhouse	II	Ashfield Green			20 May 1974	TL7598655668; 52°10′16″N 0°34′19″E		1264846	Upload Photo	Q26555498
Little Timbers	II	Ashfield Green			20 May 1974	TL7605655883; 52°10′23″N 0°34′23″E		1264847	Upload Photo	Q26555499
Attleton Green Farmhouse	II	Attleton Green			20 May 1974	TL7381154943; 52°09′55″N 0°32′24″E		1235895	Upload Photo	Q26529180
Butler's Hall	II	Attleton Green			20 May 1974	TL7400954820; 52°09′51″N 0°32′34″E		1264848	Upload Photo	Q26555500
Gaines Hall	II	Attleton Green			20 May 1974	TL7403155149; 52°10′02″N 0°32′36″E		1235896	Upload Photo	Q26529181
Woodlea and West Cottage	II	Attleton Green			20 May 1974	TL7416454857; 52°09′52″N 0°32′42″E		1264855	Upload Photo	Q26555504
Byford House	II	Barber's Lane			20 May 1974	TL7536258322; 52°11′43″N 0°33′52″E		1235911	Upload Photo	Q26529193
Newhouse Farmhouse	II	Baxter's Green			20 May 1974	TL7548157937; 52°11′30″N 0°33′57″E		1264856	Upload Photo	Q26555505
Boyden End Cottages	II	Boyden End			20 May 1974	TL7388255873; 52°10′25″N 0°32′29″E		1264857	Upload Photo	Q26555506
Boyden End Stables	II	Boyden End			20 May 1974	TL7393355852; 52°10′25″N 0°32′32″E		1235912	Upload Photo	Q26529194
Rookery Farmhouse	II	Bury Lane			20 May 1974	TL7435357764; 52°11′26″N 0°32′57″E		1235914	Upload Photo	Q26529196
Wickhambrook War Memorial	II	Cemetery Road, CB8 8UW	war memorial		1 November 2019	TL7457855466; 52°10′11″N 0°33′05″E		1464940	Wickhambrook War Memorial More images	Q73273493
Clopton Hall	II*	Clopton Green			19 December 1961	TL7668554737; 52°09′45″N 0°34′54″E		1264858	Upload Photo	Q17545591
Alyssum Cottage	II	Coltsfoot Green			7 October 1986	TL7498655489; 52°10′12″N 0°33′26″E		1236192	Upload Photo	Q26529442
Lane Cottage	II	Coltsfoot Green			20 May 1974	TL7494155512; 52°10′12″N 0°33′24″E		1264859	Upload Photo	Q26555507
Cutt Bush	II	Cutt Bush			20 May 1974	TL7451255112; 52°10′00″N 0°33′01″E		1235918	Upload Photo	Q26529200
Paddock Cottage	II	Genesis Green			20 May 1974	TL7492457615; 52°11′21″N 0°33′27″E		1235919	Upload Photo	Q26529201
Wakelins	II	Genesis Green			20 May 1974	TL7493957452; 52°11′15″N 0°33′28″E		1264861	Upload Photo	Q26555509
East View	II	Malting End			19 December 1961	TL7481854403; 52°09′37″N 0°33′16″E		1235921	Upload Photo	Q26529203
Hill House	II	Malting End			19 December 1961	TL7482154414; 52°09′37″N 0°33′16″E		1235920	Upload Photo	Q26529202
Selwood	II	Malting End			20 May 1974	TL7491954410; 52°09′37″N 0°33′21″E		1235922	Upload Photo	Q26529204
Thatched Cottage	II	Malting End			20 May 1974	TL7485654298; 52°09′33″N 0°33′17″E		1264824	Upload Photo	Q26555481
Beechwood House	II	Meeting Green			20 May 1974	TL7468455759; 52°10′21″N 0°33′11″E		1235923	Upload Photo	Q26529205
Clematis Cottage	II	Meeting Green			20 May 1974	TL7458055654; 52°10′18″N 0°33′05″E		1264825	Upload Photo	Q26555482
The Poplars	II	Meeting Green			20 May 1974	TL7477055893; 52°10′25″N 0°33′16″E		1235951	Upload Photo	Q26529228
United Reformed Church	II	Meeting Green			18 April 1986	TL7463055697; 52°10′19″N 0°33′08″E		1236189	Upload Photo	Q26529440
Old High Hall	II	Newmarket, CB8 8XX			20 May 1974	TL7400055899; 52°10′26″N 0°32′35″E		1235913	Upload Photo	Q26529195
Park Gate House	II	Ousden Road, CB8 8UT			20 May 1974	TL7502956484; 52°10′44″N 0°33′31″E		1264835	Upload Photo	Q26555488
Innisfree	II	Park Gate			20 May 1974	TL7491256378; 52°10′41″N 0°33′24″E		1235953	Upload Photo	Q26529230
Gaines Cottage	II	Thornes			20 May 1974	TL7437955353; 52°10′08″N 0°32′54″E		1235996	Upload Photo	Q26529269
Brookhouse Farmhouse	II	Wickham Street			20 May 1974	TL7577254115; 52°09′26″N 0°34′05″E		1236001	Upload Photo	Q26529273
Brooklyn House	II	Wickham Street, Denston			19 December 1961	TL7578854134; 52°09′27″N 0°34′06″E		1031667	Upload Photo	Q26283055
Fort George	II	Wickham Street			20 May 1974	TL7566254008; 52°09′23″N 0°33′59″E		1235958	Upload Photo	Q26529234
Hollyhocks	II	Wickham Street, Denston			20 May 1974	TL7591054222; 52°09′30″N 0°34′13″E		1181313	Upload Photo	Q26476639
Manor Cottage	II	Wickham Street			19 December 1961	TL7576954084; 52°09′25″N 0°34′05″E		1235955	Upload Photo	Q26529232
Manor Farm Barn	II	Wickham Street			27 February 2008	TL7574554160; 52°09′28″N 0°34′04″E		1392431	Upload Photo	Q26671651
Old Timbers	II	Wickham Street, Denston			20 May 1974	TL7591454234; 52°09′30″N 0°34′13″E		1376704	Upload Photo	Q26657233
Plumbers Arms	II	Wickham Street, Denston	pub		19 December 1961	TL7580454141; 52°09′27″N 0°34′07″E		1376703	Plumbers Arms More images	Q26657232
Street Farmhouse	II	Wickham Street			19 December 1961	TL7583854133; 52°09′27″N 0°34′09″E		1235954	Upload Photo	Q26529231
The Cottage	II	Wickham Street			20 May 1974	TL7568454029; 52°09′24″N 0°34′00″E		1235957	Upload Photo	Q26529233

== See also ==
- Grade I listed buildings in Suffolk
- Grade II* listed buildings in Suffolk

== Sources ==
- Bettely, James; Pevsner, Nikolaus (2015) [1961], Suffolk: West, The Buildings of England, New Haven and London: Yale University Press, ISBN 978-0-300-19655-9
