= Listed buildings in Pakenham, Suffolk =

Historic structures in Suffolk, England

Pakenham is a village and civil parish in the West Suffolk District of Suffolk, England. It contains 54 listed buildings that are recorded in the National Heritage List for England. Of these one is grade I, five are grade II* and 48 are grade II.

This list is based on the information retrieved online from Historic England.

== Key ==
Grade	Criteria
I	Buildings that are of exceptional interest
II*	Particularly important buildings of more than special interest
II	Buildings that are of special interest

== Listing ==
Name	Grade	Location	Type	Completed (Note: The date given is the date used by Historic England as significant for the initial building or that of an important part in the structure's description.)	Date designated	Grid ref. (Note: The grid reference is based on the British national grid reference system, sometimes known as OSGB36, used by the Ordnance Survey.) Geo-coordinates	Notes	Entry number (Note: The "List Entry Number" is a unique number assigned to each listed building and scheduled monument by Historic England.)	Image	Wikidata
Barton Mere House	II*	Barton Mere			14 July 1955	TL9109366950; 52°16′03″N 0°47′57″E		1031462	Upload Photo	Q17540608
Garden Walls and Gate Piers to Barton Mere House	II	Barton Mere			11 July 1983	TL9105066930; 52°16′02″N 0°47′54″E		1181175	Upload Photo	Q26476512
Lodge Cottage to Barton Mere House	II	Barton Mere			11 July 1983	TL9126166793; 52°15′58″N 0°48′05″E		1031463	Upload Photo	Q26282834
Dovecote to Redcastle Farm	II	Brand Road			14 July 1955	TL9020769332; 52°17′21″N 0°47′15″E		1031464	Upload Photo	Q26282835
Redcastle Farmhouse	II	Brand Road			14 July 1955	TL9018369328; 52°17′21″N 0°47′13″E		1181186	Upload Photo	Q26476522
Bridge Farm Cottages	II	Bury Road			11 July 1983	TL9301470131; 52°17′43″N 0°49′44″E		1181248	Upload Photo	Q26476579
Bridge Farmhouse	II	Bury Road			11 July 1983	TL9300670153; 52°17′44″N 0°49′44″E		1031468	Upload Photo	Q26282840
Cosycot	II	Bury Road			11 July 1983	TL9302470099; 52°17′42″N 0°49′45″E		1031467	Upload Photo	Q26282839
Priory Farmhouse	II	Bury Road			29 October 1968	TL9304070110; 52°17′43″N 0°49′46″E		1181203	Upload Photo	Q26476537
Stayer Cottage	II	Bury Road			11 July 1983	TL9301970055; 52°17′41″N 0°49′44″E		1031466	Upload Photo	Q26282838
Summer House to Stayer Cottage	II	Bury Road			11 July 1983	TL9301770020; 52°17′40″N 0°49′44″E		1181222	Upload Photo	Q26476555
The Old Woolpack Public House	II	Bury Road			11 July 1983	TL9302270106; 52°17′43″N 0°49′45″E		1181227	Upload Photo	Q26476561
The Willows	II	Bury Road			11 July 1983	TL9288569741; 52°17′31″N 0°49′37″E		1031465	Upload Photo	Q26282836
Woolpack Cottage	II	Bury Road			11 July 1983	TL9301770119; 52°17′43″N 0°49′45″E		1376835	Upload Photo	Q26657350
Avenue Cottage Nether Hall Farmhouse	II	1, Church Hill			11 July 1983	TL9275866923; 52°16′00″N 0°49′24″E		1265392	Upload Photo	Q26555990
Church Green	II	Church Hill			11 July 1983	TL9287967144; 52°16′07″N 0°49′31″E		1181322	Upload Photo	Q26476648
Church of St Mary	I	Church Hill	church building		14 July 1955	TL9298867063; 52°16′04″N 0°49′37″E		1181353	Church of St Mary More images	Q17526618
Mulberry House	II	Church Hill			11 July 1983	TL9293967162; 52°16′08″N 0°49′34″E		1285073	Upload Photo	Q26573793
The Ecke	II	Church Hill			11 July 1983	TL9292067203; 52°16′09″N 0°49′33″E		1376836	Upload Photo	Q26657351
The Old School House	II	Church Hill			11 July 1983	TL9288367173; 52°16′08″N 0°49′31″E		1031469	Upload Photo	Q26282842
1 and 2 Maulkins Cottages	II	1 and 2 Maulkins Cottages, Fen Road			11 July 1983	TL9337767699; 52°16′24″N 0°49′58″E		1376837	Upload Photo	Q26687194
3 and 4 Maulkins Cottages	II	3 and 4 Maulkins Cottages, Fen Road			11 July 1983	TL9337867719; 52°16′25″N 0°49′59″E		1181388	Upload Photo	Q26476710
Compton Cottage	II	Fen Road			11 July 1983	TL9296667237; 52°16′10″N 0°49′36″E		1031470	Upload Photo	Q26282843
Newe House	II*	Fen Road	house		14 July 1955	TL9310967257; 52°16′10″N 0°49′43″E		1181365	Newe House More images	Q7017669
Oak Cottage	II	Fen Road			11 July 1983	TL9353268562; 52°16′52″N 0°50′08″E		1031472	Upload Photo	Q26282845
The Old Royal Oak	II	Fen Road			11 July 1983	TL9355668529; 52°16′51″N 0°50′10″E		1181430	Upload Photo	Q26476749
Whiting Farm Cottage	II	Fen Road			11 July 1983	TL9344467843; 52°16′29″N 0°50′02″E		1031471	Upload Photo	Q26282844
Whitings	II	Fen Road			11 July 1983	TL9343867855; 52°16′29″N 0°50′02″E		1376838	Upload Photo	Q26657353
Grimstone Cottage	II	Grimstone End			11 July 1983	TL9374169135; 52°17′10″N 0°50′21″E		1181454	Upload Photo	Q26476773
House to South of Grimstone Cottage (the Old Shop)	II	Grimstone End			11 July 1983	TL9372669118; 52°17′10″N 0°50′20″E		1031473	Upload Photo	Q26282848
Watermill	II*	Grimstone End	museum		11 July 1983	TL9371869439; 52°17′20″N 0°50′20″E		1285022	Watermill More images	Q17545630
Watermill Farmhouse	II*	Grimstone End	farmhouse		11 July 1983	TL9371469450; 52°17′21″N 0°50′20″E		1376839	Watermill Farmhouse More images	Q17545791
The Old Farmhouse	II	Home Farm Lane			11 July 1983	TL9255867254; 52°16′11″N 0°49′14″E		1031474	Upload Photo	Q26282849
The Plains	II	The Queach			11 July 1983	TL9163369083; 52°17′11″N 0°48′29″E		1376857	Upload Photo	Q26657370
The Queach House	II	The Queach			11 July 1983	TL9105969239; 52°17′17″N 0°47′59″E		1284999	Upload Photo	Q26573727
8 the Street	II	8, The Street			11 July 1983	TL9284467243; 52°16′10″N 0°49′29″E		1031438	Upload Photo	Q26282807
Bell House	II	The Street			11 July 1983	TL9288167234; 52°16′10″N 0°49′31″E		1284957	Upload Photo	Q26573688
Bridge House	II	The Street			11 July 1983	TL9278467308; 52°16′12″N 0°49′26″E		1181549	Upload Photo	Q26476863
Brookside	II	The Street			11 July 1983	TL9274267281; 52°16′12″N 0°49′24″E		1376860	Upload Photo	Q26657373
Home Farmhouse	II	The Street			11 July 1983	TL9255967336; 52°16′14″N 0°49′15″E		1376858	Upload Photo	Q26657371
House to East of the Old Shop (mr R Bailey)	II	The Street			11 July 1983	TL9271567269; 52°16′11″N 0°49′23″E		1031437	Upload Photo	Q26282805
Laundry Cottage	II	The Street			11 July 1983	TL9267367272; 52°16′11″N 0°49′21″E		1181516	Upload Photo	Q26476834
Lodge Cottage on Nether Hall Estate	II	The Street			11 July 1983	TL9260067303; 52°16′13″N 0°49′17″E		1284966	Upload Photo	Q26573696
Nether Hall	II	The Street	building		15 November 1954	TL9267866886; 52°15′59″N 0°49′20″E		1031435	Nether Hall More images	Q26282803
Pakenham Lodge	II	The Street			11 July 1983	TL9244267357; 52°16′14″N 0°49′09″E		1031434	Upload Photo	Q26282802
Pips Cottage	II	The Street, IP31 2JU			11 July 1983	TL9265867278; 52°16′12″N 0°49′20″E		1376859	Upload Photo	Q26657372
The Old Shop	II	The Street			11 July 1983	TL9269867274; 52°16′11″N 0°49′22″E		1031436	Upload Photo	Q26282804
White Cottage	II	The Street			11 July 1983	TL9269667295; 52°16′12″N 0°49′22″E		1181526	Upload Photo	Q26476843
Pakenham Windmill	II*	Thieves Lane	windmill		14 July 1955	TL9309369414; 52°17′20″N 0°49′47″E		1376861	Pakenham Windmill More images	Q7125453
3, Upper Town	II	3, Upper Town			11 July 1983	TL9221967705; 52°16′26″N 0°48′57″E		1031439	Upload Photo	Q26282808
Well Cottage and Penn Cottage	II	Upper Town			11 July 1983	TL9218567736; 52°16′27″N 0°48′56″E		1031440	Upload Photo	Q26282809
Whits Cottages	II	Upper Town			11 July 1983	TL9216767722; 52°16′27″N 0°48′55″E		1181567	Upload Photo	Q26476881

== See also ==
- Grade I listed buildings in Suffolk
- Grade II* listed buildings in Suffolk

== Sources ==
- Bettely, James; Pevsner, Nikolaus (2015) [1961], Suffolk: West, The Buildings of England, New Haven and London: Yale University Press, ISBN 978-0-300-19655-9
