= Listed buildings in Bardwell, Suffolk =

Civil Parish in Suffolk, England

Bardwell is a village and civil parish in the West Suffolk District of Suffolk, England. It contains 50 listed buildings that are recorded in the National Heritage List for England. Of these one is grade I, two are grade II* and 47 are grade II.

This list is based on the information retrieved online from Historic England.

== Key ==
Grade	Criteria
I	Buildings that are of exceptional interest
II*	Particularly important buildings of more than special interest
II	Buildings that are of special interest

== Listing ==
Name	Grade	Location	Type	Completed (Note: The date given is the date used by Historic England as significant for the initial building or that of an important part in the structure's description.)	Date designated	Grid ref. (Note: The grid reference is based on the British national grid reference system, sometimes known as OSGB36, used by the Ordnance Survey.) Geo-coordinates	Notes	Entry number (Note: The "List Entry Number" is a unique number assigned to each listed building and scheduled monument by Historic England.)	Image	Wikidata
Barn to South West of Barningham Park	II	Barningham Road, Barningham			14 December 1983	TL9427177763; 52°21′49″N 0°51′07″E		1031341	Upload Photo	Q26282699
Barningham Park	II	Barningham Road, Barningham			14 December 1983	TL9432577799; 52°21′50″N 0°51′09″E		1376888	Upload Photo	Q26657398
Bowbeck House	II	Bowbeck			14 December 1983	TL9410575307; 52°20′29″N 0°50′53″E		1031342	Upload Photo	Q26282701
Lavender Barn	II	Bowbeck, IP31 1BA			14 July 1955	TL9444875265; 52°20′28″N 0°51′11″E		1031343	Upload Photo	Q26282702
Minden House	II	Bowbeck, IP31 1BA			14 July 1955	TL9444775295; 52°20′29″N 0°51′11″E		1376889	Upload Photo	Q26657399
Bell Cottage	II	Church Road			14 December 1983	TL9409273579; 52°19′33″N 0°50′48″E		1031344	Upload Photo	Q26282703
Church Cottage	II	Church Road			14 December 1983	TL9412073502; 52°19′31″N 0°50′50″E		1031345	Upload Photo	Q26282704
Church House	II	Church Road			14 December 1983	TL9408673563; 52°19′33″N 0°50′48″E		1031346	Upload Photo	Q26282705
Church of Ss Peter and Paul	I	Church Road	church building		14 July 1955	TL9410673620; 52°19′35″N 0°50′49″E		1376891	Church of Ss Peter and Paul More images	Q17526944
The Old Post Office	II	Church Road			14 December 1983	TL9413173554; 52°19′33″N 0°50′50″E		1376890	Upload Photo	Q26657400
Place Farmhouse	II	Ixworth Thorpe Road			14 December 1983	TL9363473698; 52°19′38″N 0°50′24″E		1031349	Upload Photo	Q26282708
Elm Tree Cottage	II	Knox Lane			14 December 1983	TL9443673075; 52°19′17″N 0°51′05″E		1031308	Upload Photo	Q26282665
Ghent Cottage Merrow Cottage the Cottage Timberscombe	II	2, Low Street			14 December 1983	TL9416472997; 52°19′15″N 0°50′51″E		1031312	Upload Photo	Q26282668
Baptist Church	II	Low Street			14 December 1983	TL9400472812; 52°19′09″N 0°50′42″E		1376912	Upload Photo	Q26657420
Bardwell Hall	II*	Low Street	house		14 July 1955	TL9400272615; 52°19′02″N 0°50′42″E		1031309	Bardwell Hall More images	Q17540514
Barn to Bardwell Hall	II	Low Street			14 December 1983	TL9404572655; 52°19′04″N 0°50′44″E		1031310	Upload Photo	Q26282666
Brook House	II	Low Street, IP31 1AS			14 December 1983	TL9415373027; 52°19′16″N 0°50′50″E		1031318	Upload Photo	Q26282675
Garden Wall and Gate Piers to Pelham House	II	Low Street			14 December 1983	TL9410172930; 52°19′13″N 0°50′47″E		1376913	Upload Photo	Q26657421
Hillfield Cottage	II	Low Street			14 December 1983	TL9424373242; 52°19′22″N 0°50′56″E		1031313	Upload Photo	Q26282669
Mothersoles	II	Low Street			14 July 1955	TL9410972896; 52°19′11″N 0°50′48″E		1031311	Upload Photo	Q26282667
Pelham House	II	Low Street			14 July 1955	TL9407972908; 52°19′12″N 0°50′46″E		1031315	Upload Photo	Q26282671
Rowan Cottage	II	Low Street			14 December 1983	TL9415073004; 52°19′15″N 0°50′50″E		1376914	Upload Photo	Q26657422
Street Farmhouse	II	Low Street			14 July 1955	TL9421573307; 52°19′25″N 0°50′54″E		1284833	Upload Photo	Q26573572
The Maltings	II	Low Street			14 December 1983	TL9415373010; 52°19′15″N 0°50′50″E		1181809	Upload Photo	Q26477104
The Old Green Man	II	Low Street			14 December 1983	TL9424373287; 52°19′24″N 0°50′56″E		1031314	Upload Photo	Q26282670
The Willows	II	Low Street			14 December 1983	TL9413072978; 52°19′14″N 0°50′49″E		1181806	Upload Photo	Q26477100
Willow Cottage	II	Low Street			14 December 1983	TL9414572996; 52°19′15″N 0°50′50″E		1031317	Upload Photo	Q26282673
The Old Guildhall	II	Quaker Lane			14 July 1955	TL9416073622; 52°19′35″N 0°50′52″E		1376915	Upload Photo	Q26657423
Bardwell Voluntary Controlled School	II	School Lane			14 December 1983	TL9411273891; 52°19′44″N 0°50′50″E		1031320	Upload Photo	Q26282677
Barn 200 Yards North of Watermill Farmhouse	II	School Lane			14 December 1983	TL9361074324; 52°19′58″N 0°50′24″E		1181851	Upload Photo	Q26477141
The School House	II	School Lane			14 December 1983	TL9410273896; 52°19′44″N 0°50′50″E		1376916	Upload Photo	Q26657424
Watermill	II	School Lane			14 December 1983	TL9356474240; 52°19′56″N 0°50′22″E		1284834	Upload Photo	Q26573573
Watermill Farmhouse	II	School Lane			14 December 1983	TL9358074236; 52°19′55″N 0°50′23″E		1031319	Upload Photo	Q26282676
Windmill	II*	School Lane	windmill		14 December 1983	TL9410773806; 52°19′41″N 0°50′50″E		1181859	Windmill More images	Q4860242
Foxglove Cottage	II	Spring Road, IP31 1AY			14 December 1983	TL9420774307; 52°19′57″N 0°50′56″E		1284820	Upload Photo	Q26573559
Moat House	II	Spring Road			14 December 1983	TL9432274076; 52°19′49″N 0°51′02″E		1031321	Upload Photo	Q26282678
The Cottage	II	Spring Road			14 December 1983	TL9428973917; 52°19′44″N 0°50′59″E		1376917	Upload Photo	Q26657425
The Old Barn, Stable End	II	Stable End, Low Street			14 December 1983	TL9409972938; 52°19′13″N 0°50′47″E		1031316	Upload Photo	Q26282672
Booty Hall	II	The Green			14 December 1983	TL9446973659; 52°19′36″N 0°51′08″E		1031348	Upload Photo	Q26282707
Croft House	II	The Green			14 December 1983	TL9437473723; 52°19′38″N 0°51′04″E		1376894	Upload Photo	Q26657403
Holly House	II	The Green			14 December 1983	TL9441573791; 52°19′40″N 0°51′06″E		1376892	Upload Photo	Q26657401
Littlemoor Hall	II	The Green			14 July 1955	TL9456373811; 52°19′40″N 0°51′14″E		1031347	Upload Photo	Q26282706
Six Bells Inn	II	The Green	inn		14 December 1983	TL9466673711; 52°19′37″N 0°51′19″E		1376893	Six Bells Inn More images	Q26657402
The Chestnuts	II	The Green			14 December 1983	TL9439473766; 52°19′39″N 0°51′05″E		1181788	Upload Photo	Q26477085
The Old Farmhouse	II	The Green			14 December 1983	TL9438973675; 52°19′36″N 0°51′04″E		1181785	Upload Photo	Q26477082
Dun Cow Cottage	II	Up Street			14 December 1983	TL9432173881; 52°19′43″N 0°51′01″E		1376918	Upload Photo	Q26657426
Ivydene	II	Up Street			14 December 1983	TL9431173892; 52°19′43″N 0°51′01″E		1284791	Upload Photo	Q26573535
The Dun Cow Public House	II	Up Street	pub		14 December 1983	TL9430873854; 52°19′42″N 0°51′00″E		1284786	The Dun Cow Public House More images	Q26573530
The Old Rectory	II	Up Street			14 December 1983	TL9431573778; 52°19′40″N 0°51′01″E		1181871	Upload Photo	Q26477158
Vine Farmhouse	II	Up Street			14 December 1983	TL9432073833; 52°19′41″N 0°51′01″E		1031322	Upload Photo	Q26282679

== See also ==
- Grade I listed buildings in Suffolk
- Grade II* listed buildings in Suffolk

== Sources ==
- Bettely, James; Pevsner, Nikolaus (2015) [1961], Suffolk: West, The Buildings of England, New Haven and London: Yale University Press, ISBN 978-0-300-19655-9
