= Listed buildings in Mildenhall, Suffolk =

Civil Parish in Suffolk, England

Mildenhall is a town and civil parish in the West Suffolk District of Suffolk, England. It contains 51 listed buildings that are recorded in the National Heritage List for England. Of these one is grade I and 50 are grade II.

This list is based on the information retrieved online from Historic England.

== Key ==
Grade	Criteria
I	Buildings that are of exceptional interest
II*	Particularly important buildings of more than special interest
II	Buildings that are of special interest

== Listing ==
Name	Grade	Location	Type	Completed (Note: The date given is the date used by Historic England as significant for the initial building or that of an important part in the structure's description.)	Date designated	Grid ref. (Note: The grid reference is based on the British national grid reference system, sometimes known as OSGB36, used by the Ordnance Survey.) Geo-coordinates	Notes	Entry number (Note: The "List Entry Number" is a unique number assigned to each listed building and scheduled monument by Historic England.)	Image	Wikidata
Mildenhall War Memorial	II		war memorial		20 June 2022	TL7117974750; 52°20′39″N 0°30′41″E		1481073	Mildenhall War Memorial More images	Q104758736
Springvale	II	1, High Street			2 October 1984	TL7109374783; 52°20′40″N 0°30′37″E		1037564	Upload Photo	Q26289283
4, High Street	II	4, High Street			2 October 1984	TL7106074760; 52°20′39″N 0°30′35″E		1194145	Upload Photo	Q26488776
The Chess Gallery	II	6, High Street			2 October 1984	TL7105574754; 52°20′39″N 0°30′35″E		1037565	Upload Photo	Q26289284
14, High Street	II	14, High Street			2 October 1984	TL7103374691; 52°20′37″N 0°30′34″E		1194164	Upload Photo	Q26488795
16, High Street	II	16, High Street			2 October 1984	TL7104274675; 52°20′37″N 0°30′34″E		1037566	Upload Photo	Q26289285
17 and 19, High Street	II	17 and 19, High Street			7 May 1954	TL7107274630; 52°20′35″N 0°30′36″E		1285808	Upload Photo	Q26574470
22, 24 and 26, High Street	II	22, 24 and 26, High Street			2 October 1984	TL7105274634; 52°20′35″N 0°30′34″E		1194207	Upload Photo	Q26488837
30 and 32 High Street	II	30 and 32, High Street			2 October 1984	TL7106574550; 52°20′32″N 0°30′35″E		1037567	Upload Photo	Q26289286
Hutchinson Opticians Sugar and Spice	II	37, High Street			2 October 1984	TL7109974535; 52°20′32″N 0°30′37″E		1037569	Upload Photo	Q26289289
45, High Street	II	45, High Street			2 October 1984	TL7109874494; 52°20′31″N 0°30′37″E		1285789	Upload Photo	Q26574453
Lloyds Bank	II	High Street			2 October 1984	TL7108074516; 52°20′31″N 0°30′36″E		1037570	Lloyds Bank More images	Q26289290
Methodist Church	II	High Street			7 May 1954	TL7107874776; 52°20′40″N 0°30′36″E		1351325	Upload Photo	Q26634439
The Bell Hotel	II	High Street	hotel		2 October 1984	TL7108274591; 52°20′34″N 0°30′36″E		1037568	The Bell Hotel More images	Q26289288
Shrubland House	II	2, King Street			7 May 1954	TL7115674744; 52°20′39″N 0°30′40″E		1285754	Upload Photo	Q26574418
12, Kingsway	II	12, Kingsway			20 August 1991	TL7130574771; 52°20′39″N 0°30′48″E		1277763	Upload Photo	Q26567155
1 and 2, Market Place	II	1 and 2, Market Place			7 May 1954	TL7106274673; 52°20′36″N 0°30′35″E		1037571	Upload Photo	Q26289291
3 Market Place	II	3, Market Place			2 October 1990	TL7107074675; 52°20′36″N 0°30′36″E		1037544	Upload Photo	Q26289267
4, Market Place	II	4, Market Place			2 October 1984	TL7107774675; 52°20′36″N 0°30′36″E		1285765	Upload Photo	Q26574429
Oak House Part of Doctors Surgery the Old Gift Shop	II	6, Market Place			7 May 1954	TL7108674678; 52°20′37″N 0°30′36″E		1037572	Upload Photo	Q26289292
Part of Doctors Surgery the Market Cafe	II	8 and 9, Market Place			7 May 1954	TL7110274683; 52°20′37″N 0°30′37″E		1194330	Upload Photo	Q26488957
Nationwide Building Society	II	11, Market Place			4 June 1992	TL7112674676; 52°20′36″N 0°30′38″E		1037545	Upload Photo	Q26289268
Parish Pump, 25 Metres East of the Market Cross	II	25 Metres East Of The Market Cross, Market Place			2 October 1984	TL7109374670; 52°20′36″N 0°30′37″E		1037573	Upload Photo	Q26289293
33, Market Place	II	33, Market Place			6 March 1986	TL7109474657; 52°20′36″N 0°30′37″E		1351354	Upload Photo	Q26634464
Rutters and Former Museum	II	Market Place			2 October 1984	TL7108274639; 52°20′35″N 0°30′36″E		1037574	Upload Photo	Q26289294
The Cobbles Restaurant	II	Market Place			2 October 1984	TL7111874656; 52°20′36″N 0°30′38″E		1194352	Upload Photo	Q26488979
The Market Cross	II	Market Place	building		7 May 1954	TL7106974660; 52°20′36″N 0°30′35″E		1351326	The Market Cross More images	Q17641609
The Dome Sports Centre	II	Mildenhall, Bury St. Edmunds, IP28 7HT			9 August 2021	TL7211574595; 52°20′33″N 0°31′31″E		1476650	Upload Photo	Q111853393
1, Mill Street	II	1, Mill Street			2 October 1984	TL7106774510; 52°20′31″N 0°30′35″E		1194368	Upload Photo	Q26488993
34, High Street (see Details for Further Address Information)	II	2, Mill Street			2 October 1984	TL7106474537; 52°20′32″N 0°30′35″E		1194419	Upload Photo	Q26489045
4, Mill Street	II	4, Mill Street			2 October 1984	TL7105674529; 52°20′32″N 0°30′35″E		1037576	Upload Photo	Q26289296
5, Mill Street	II	5, Mill Street			2 October 1984	TL7104674499; 52°20′31″N 0°30′34″E		1351327	Upload Photo	Q26634441
6, Mill Street	II	6, Mill Street			2 October 1984	TL7104974522; 52°20′32″N 0°30′34″E		1037577	Upload Photo	Q26289298
7 and 7a, Mill Street	II	7 and 7a, Mill Street			2 October 1984	TL7103574490; 52°20′31″N 0°30′33″E		1194381	Upload Photo	Q26489007
9 Mill Street	II	9, Mill Street			2 October 1984	TL7102874482; 52°20′30″N 0°30′33″E		1037575	Upload Photo	Q26289295
13, Mill Street	II	13, Mill Street			27 January 1972	TL7100674465; 52°20′30″N 0°30′32″E		1194405	Upload Photo	Q26489029
16, Mill Street	II	16, Mill Street			2 October 1984	TL7101474496; 52°20′31″N 0°30′32″E		1194437	Upload Photo	Q26489063
Clinton House	II	22, Mill Street			7 May 1954	TL7096774457; 52°20′30″N 0°30′30″E		1351329	Upload Photo	Q26634443
Mill House	II	32, Mill Street			7 May 1954	TL7095674411; 52°20′28″N 0°30′29″E		1194443	Upload Photo	Q26489069
The Riverside Hotel	II	Mill Street	hotel		7 May 1954	TL7098474416; 52°20′28″N 0°30′31″E		1351328	The Riverside Hotel More images	Q26634442
The Courthouse	II	Queensway			2 October 1984	TL7111174810; 52°20′41″N 0°30′38″E		1351330	Upload Photo	Q26634444
31, 33 and 35 High Street and 2 St Andrew's Street	II	2, St Andrew's Street			2 October 1984	TL7108374549; 52°20′32″N 0°30′36″E		1194259	Upload Photo	Q26488888
11, St Andrew's Street	II	11, St Andrew's Street			2 October 1984	TL7113974585; 52°20′33″N 0°30′39″E		1285684	Upload Photo	Q26574355
The Priory	II	12, The Church Yard			7 May 1954	TL7097374560; 52°20′33″N 0°30′30″E		1037562	Upload Photo	Q26289281
Hanmer Almshouses	II	14 - 17, The Church Yard	almshouse		7 May 1954	TL7097874598; 52°20′34″N 0°30′31″E		1351324	Hanmer Almshouses More images	Q26634438
Ruin of Charnel House About 10 Metres South of the South Aisle of Church of St Mary	II	The Churchard			7 May 1954	TL7104574579; 52°20′33″N 0°30′34″E		1351323	Upload Photo	Q26634437
13, the Churchyard	II	13, The Churchyard			25 November 1994	TL7097974573; 52°20′33″N 0°30′31″E		1248756	Upload Photo	Q26540947
Church of St Mary	I	The Churchyard	church building		7 May 1954	TL7102674598; 52°20′34″N 0°30′33″E		1037561	Church of St Mary More images	Q15979423
Barn 100 Metres South East of Wamil Hall	II	Wamil			2 October 1984	TL6962274315; 52°20′26″N 0°29′18″E		1037541	Upload Photo	Q26289264
Wamil Hall	II	Wamil			7 May 1954	TL6955774403; 52°20′29″N 0°29′15″E		1351352	Upload Photo	Q26634463
Entrance Gateway 15 Metres North of Wamil Hall, with Attached Flanking Walls Which Return Towards Wamil Hall	II	With Attached Flanking Walls Which Return Towards Wamil Hall			2 October 1984	TL6955074424; 52°20′30″N 0°29′15″E		1037540	Upload Photo	Q26289263

== See also ==
- Grade I listed buildings in Suffolk
- Grade II* listed buildings in Suffolk

== Sources ==
- Bettely, James; Pevsner, Nikolaus (2015) [1961], Suffolk: West, The Buildings of England, New Haven and London: Yale University Press, ISBN 978-0-300-19655-9
