= Listed buildings in Ickworth =

Historic structures in Suffolk, England

Ickworth is a village and civil parish in the West Suffolk District of Suffolk, England. It contains 14 listed buildings that are recorded in the National Heritage List for England. Of these one is grade I, one is grade II* and twelve are grade II.

This list is based on the information retrieved online from Historic England.

== Key ==
| Grade | Criteria |
|---|---|
| I | Buildings that are of exceptional interest |
| II* | Particularly important buildings of more than special interest |
| II | Buildings that are of special interest |

== Listing ==
| Name | Grade | Location | Type | Completed (Note: The date given is the date used by Historic England as significant for the initial building or that of an important part in the structure's description.) | Date designated | Grid ref. (Note: The grid reference is based on the British national grid reference system, sometimes known as OSGB36, used by the Ordnance Survey.) Geo-coordinates | Notes | Entry number (Note: The "List Entry Number" is a unique number assigned to each listed building and scheduled monument by Historic England.) | Image | Wikidata |
|---|---|---|---|---|---|---|---|---|---|---|
| Ickworth House | I | | English country house | | 14 July 1955 | TL8158161332; 52°13′13″N 0°39′25″E | | 1205300 | Ickworth House More images | Q5986517 |
| Balustrading, 20 Yards North of Main Entrance | II | 20 Yards North Of Main Entrance, Ickworth House | | | 25 August 1983 | TL8159761374; 52°13′14″N 0°39′25″E | | 1298914 | Upload Photo | Q26586353 |
| Ha Ha, 80 Yards South of Rotunda | II | 80 Yards South Of Rotunda, Ickworth House | | | 25 August 1983 | TL8154561238; 52°13′10″N 0°39′22″E | | 1280794 | Upload Photo | Q26569886 |
| Coach House 180 Yards East of Main Entrance | II | Ickworth House | | | 25 August 1983 | TL8176061414; 52°13′15″N 0°39′34″E | | 1280759 | Upload Photo | Q26569853 |
| Stable Block 180 Yards East of Main Entrance | II | Ickworth House | | | 25 August 1983 | TL8177461395; 52°13′15″N 0°39′35″E | | 1187000 | Upload Photo | Q26482237 |
| Monument Meadow | II | 5, Ickworth Park | | | 25 August 1983 | TL8092859799; 52°12′24″N 0°38′47″E | | 1187004 | Upload Photo | Q26482240 |
| Dairy Cottages | II | 18 and 19, Ickworth Park | | | 25 August 1983 | TL8130161965; 52°13′34″N 0°39′11″E | | 1187005 | Upload Photo | Q26482241 |
| Church of St Mary | II* | Ickworth Park | church building | | 14 July 1955 | TL8124861115; 52°13′06″N 0°39′07″E | | 1187001 | Church of St Mary More images | Q7594354 |
| Garden Wall 100 Yards South of St Marys Church | II | Ickworth Park | | | 25 August 1983 | TL8114761035; 52°13′04″N 0°39′01″E | | 1280763 | Upload Photo | Q26569857 |
| Garden Walling 50 Yards West of Sir John Hervey's Summerhouse | II | Ickworth Park | | | 25 August 1983 | TL8106960960; 52°13′02″N 0°38′57″E | | 1187003 | Upload Photo | Q26482239 |
| Ickworth Lodge | II | Ickworth Park | | | 25 August 1983 | TL8140162013; 52°13′35″N 0°39′16″E | | 1280769 | Upload Photo | Q26569861 |
| Mordaboys | II | Ickworth Park | | | 25 August 1983 | TL8113463027; 52°14′08″N 0°39′04″E | | 1280771 | Upload Photo | Q26569863 |
| Roundhouse Cottage | II | Ickworth Park | | | 25 August 1983 | TL8169860229; 52°12′37″N 0°39′29″E | | 1205334 | Upload Photo | Q26500686 |
| Sir John Hervey's Summerhouse | II | Ickworth Park | | | 25 August 1983 | TL8112160959; 52°13′01″N 0°39′00″E | | 1187002 | Upload Photo | Q26482238 |

== See also ==
- Grade I listed buildings in Suffolk
- Grade II* listed buildings in Suffolk

== Sources ==
- Bettely, James; Pevsner, Nikolaus (2015) [1961], Suffolk: West, The Buildings of England, New Haven and London: Yale University Press, ISBN 978-0-300-19655-9
