= Listed buildings in Clare, Suffolk =

Historic structures in Suffolk, England

Clare is a village and civil parish in the West Suffolk District of Suffolk, England. It contains 133 listed buildings that are recorded in the National Heritage List for England. Of these six are grade I, twelve are grade II* and 115 are grade II.

This list is based on the information retrieved online from Historic England.

== Key ==
Grade	Criteria
I	Buildings that are of exceptional interest
II*	Particularly important buildings of more than special interest
II	Buildings that are of special interest

== Listing ==
Name	Grade	Location	Type	Completed (Note: The date given is the date used by Historic England as significant for the initial building or that of an important part in the structure's description.)	Date designated	Grid ref. (Note: The grid reference is based on the British national grid reference system, sometimes known as OSGB36, used by the Ordnance Survey.) Geo-coordinates	Notes	Entry number (Note: The "List Entry Number" is a unique number assigned to each listed building and scheduled monument by Historic England.)	Image	Wikidata
Road Bridge Over the River Stour on the Great Yeldham Road Approximately 84 Yards South-east of the Junction with Nethergate Street	II				20 May 1974	TL7677544896; 52°04′27″N 0°34′41″E		1194234	Upload Photo	Q26488864
Broadway House and Tudor Cottage	II				19 December 1961	TL7693845211; 52°04′37″N 0°34′50″E		1031717	Broadway House and Tudor Cottage More images	Q26283106
Clare Castle	II*		castle		19 December 1961	TL7703545201; 52°04′37″N 0°34′55″E		1031764	Clare Castle More images	Q5126141
Clare Priory	I		English country house		19 December 1961	TL7694745010; 52°04′31″N 0°34′50″E		1376670	Clare Priory More images	Q5126238
Hermitage Farmhouse	II				20 May 1974	TL7738646338; 52°05′13″N 0°35′16″E		1031765	Upload Photo	Q26283152
Parish Church of Ss Peter and Paul	I		church building		19 December 1961	TL7696445461; 52°04′45″N 0°34′52″E		1194114	Parish Church of Ss Peter and Paul More images	Q15979483
Clare Priory Farmhouse	II	Ashen Road			30 May 1990	TL7701444925; 52°04′28″N 0°34′53″E		1264628	Upload Photo	Q26555307
1-4, Bridewell Street	II	1-4, Bridewell Street			20 May 1974	TL7699645750; 52°04′55″N 0°34′54″E		1031766	1-4, Bridewell Street More images	Q26283153
5-8, Bridewell Street	II	5-8, Bridewell Street			20 May 1974	TL7699645767; 52°04′55″N 0°34′54″E		1285778	5-8, Bridewell Street More images	Q26574442
13-15, Bridewell Street	II	13-15, Bridewell Street			20 May 1974	TL7700045807; 52°04′56″N 0°34′54″E		1031767	13-15, Bridewell Street More images	Q26283154
30-34, Bridewell Street	II	30-34, Bridewell Street			20 May 1974	TL7702145841; 52°04′57″N 0°34′55″E		1194265	30-34, Bridewell Street More images	Q26488894
37, Bridewell Street	II	37, Bridewell Street			20 May 1974	TL7702245823; 52°04′57″N 0°34′55″E		1031768	37, Bridewell Street More images	Q26283155
38, Bridewell Street	II	38, Bridewell Street			20 May 1974	TL7701945813; 52°04′57″N 0°34′55″E		1194300	38, Bridewell Street More images	Q26488927
46 and 47, Bridewell Street	II	46 and 47, Bridewell Street			20 May 1974	TL7701645764; 52°04′55″N 0°34′55″E		1194319	46 and 47, Bridewell Street More images	Q26488946
48, Bridewell Street	II	48, Bridewell Street			20 May 1974	TL7702045754; 52°04′55″N 0°34′55″E		1031770	48, Bridewell Street More images	Q26283158
Red Lion Inn	II	Bridewell Street			20 May 1974	TL7702045779; 52°04′55″N 0°34′55″E		1031769	Red Lion Inn More images	Q26283157
2, Callis Street	II	2, Callis Street			19 December 1961	TL7694245574; 52°04′49″N 0°34′51″E		1031771	2, Callis Street More images	Q26283159
Cock Inn and Peterhouse	II	3, Callis Street	inn		19 December 1961	TL7694645592; 52°04′49″N 0°34′51″E		1285750	Cock Inn and Peterhouse More images	Q26574414
6-9, Callis Street	II	6-9, Callis Street			19 December 1961	TL7695045611; 52°04′50″N 0°34′51″E		1031772	6-9, Callis Street More images	Q26283160
Globe Inn	II	10, Callis Street	inn		19 December 1961	TL7695245627; 52°04′51″N 0°34′51″E		1194394	Globe Inn More images	Q26489020
11 and 12, Callis Street	II	11 and 12, Callis Street, Sudbury, CO10 8PX			19 December 1961	TL7695945632; 52°04′51″N 0°34′52″E		1376671	11 and 12, Callis Street More images	Q26687188
Malting House	II	13, Callis Street			19 December 1961	TL7696145640; 52°04′51″N 0°34′52″E		1376690	Malting House More images	Q26657220
22 and 23, Callis Street	II	22 and 23, Callis Street			20 May 1974	TL7700645684; 52°04′52″N 0°34′54″E		1376691	22 and 23, Callis Street More images	Q26657221
Callis House	II	27, Callis Street, Sudbury, CO10 8PX			20 May 1974	TL7700045644; 52°04′51″N 0°34′54″E		1031731	Upload Photo	Q26283118
Brookside	II	28, Callis Street			20 May 1974	TL7700045625; 52°04′50″N 0°34′54″E		1376692	Brookside More images	Q26657222
Grove House	II	30, Callis Street			20 May 1974	TL7700045575; 52°04′49″N 0°34′54″E		1031732	Grove House More images	Q26283119
31-33, Callis Street	II	31-33, Callis Street			19 December 1961	TL7698245561; 52°04′48″N 0°34′53″E		1031733	31-33, Callis Street More images	Q26283120
34 and 35, Callis Street	II	34 and 35, Callis Street			19 December 1961	TL7697545548; 52°04′48″N 0°34′52″E		1376693	34 and 35, Callis Street More images	Q26657223
36, Callis Street	II	36, Callis Street			20 May 1974	TL7697445542; 52°04′48″N 0°34′52″E		1031734	36, Callis Street More images	Q26283122
37, Callis Street	II	37, Callis Street			20 May 1974	TL7697445537; 52°04′48″N 0°34′52″E		1376694	37, Callis Street More images	Q26657224
Clare Board School	II	Callis Street	school building		2 May 1985	TL7694045549; 52°04′48″N 0°34′51″E		1264713	Clare Board School More images	Q26555386
The Maltings	II	Callis Street			19 December 1961	TL7696245643; 52°04′51″N 0°34′52″E		1031730	The Maltings More images	Q26283117
Premises Occupied by Scarffs (deep Freeze), Castle House and Adjoining Shop Premises	II	Castle House And Adjoining Shop Premises, Well Lane			19 December 1961	TL7696645235; 52°04′38″N 0°34′51″E		1031689	Premises Occupied by Scarffs (deep Freeze), Castle House and Adjoining Shop Premises More images	Q26283077
Sunnybank	II	32, Cavendish Road			20 May 1974	TL7710245419; 52°04′44″N 0°34′59″E		1031735	Upload Photo	Q26283123
Hillside	II	33, Cavendish Road			20 May 1974	TL7711745422; 52°04′44″N 0°35′00″E		1285657	Upload Photo	Q26574331
Clare Hall	II	Cavendish Road			20 May 1974	TL7786245535; 52°04′47″N 0°35′39″E		1194490	Upload Photo	Q26489113
Chapel Cottage	II*	Chilton Road	cottage		19 December 1961	TL7678146497; 52°05′19″N 0°34′44″E		1031736	Chapel Cottage More images	Q17545302
Chilton Hall	II	Chilton Street			19 December 1961	TL7541047025; 52°05′38″N 0°33′33″E		1031737	Upload Photo	Q26283124
Chilton Lodge Farm Farmhouse	II	Chilton Street			20 May 1974	TL7517446971; 52°05′36″N 0°33′21″E		1376696	Upload Photo	Q26657226
Gates to Chilton Hall	II	Chilton Street			20 May 1974	TL7539947031; 52°05′38″N 0°33′33″E		1285647	Upload Photo	Q26574322
Granary to Home Farm	II	Chilton Street			20 May 1974	TL7575846981; 52°05′36″N 0°33′51″E		1194585	Upload Photo	Q26489205
Home Farm Farmhouse	II	Chilton Street			19 December 1961	TL7572546949; 52°05′35″N 0°33′49″E		1376695	Upload Photo	Q26657225
Motts Farmhouse	II	Chilton Street			19 December 1961	TL7564747015; 52°05′37″N 0°33′45″E		1285650	Upload Photo	Q26574325
Row of Cottages Between Motts Farm and Home Farm	II	Chilton Street			10 August 1973	TL7568046999; 52°05′36″N 0°33′47″E		1031738	Upload Photo	Q26283125
Strutt's House	II	Chilton Street, CO10 8QS			20 May 1974	TL7580946877; 52°05′32″N 0°33′54″E		1285660	Upload Photo	Q26574334
3, Church Street	II	3, Church Street			20 May 1974	TL7699345409; 52°04′43″N 0°34′53″E		1376697	3, Church Street More images	Q26657227
8-10, Church Street	II	8-10, Church Street			20 May 1974	TL7700245472; 52°04′46″N 0°34′54″E		1285627	8-10, Church Street More images	Q26574304
11, Church Street	II	11, Church Street			20 May 1974	TL7700545464; 52°04′45″N 0°34′54″E		1031740	11, Church Street More images	Q26283127
12 and 13, Church Street	II	12 and 13, Church Street			20 May 1974	TL7700545453; 52°04′45″N 0°34′54″E		1376698	12 and 13, Church Street More images	Q26657228
14, 15, Church Street	II	14, 15, Church Street			20 May 1974	TL7700945441; 52°04′45″N 0°34′54″E		1285598	14, 15, Church Street More images	Q26574277
Rosina Cottage	II	16, Church Street			20 May 1974	TL7700845434; 52°04′44″N 0°34′54″E		1031741	Rosina Cottage More images	Q26283128
17 and 18, Church Street	II	17 and 18, Church Street			20 May 1974	TL7700845426; 52°04′44″N 0°34′54″E		1194632	17 and 18, Church Street More images	Q26489248
19 and 20, Church Street	II	19 and 20, Church Street			20 May 1974	TL7701045414; 52°04′44″N 0°34′54″E		1376699	19 and 20, Church Street More images	Q26657229
Gothic House	II	Church Street			20 May 1974	TL7700345495; 52°04′46″N 0°34′54″E		1031739	Gothic House More images	Q26283126
Merton House	II	Church Street			20 May 1974	TL7699045530; 52°04′47″N 0°34′53″E		1194593	Merton House More images	Q26489213
Chapel to Clare Priory	I	Clare Priory	chapel		19 December 1961	TL7700045000; 52°04′30″N 0°34′53″E		1285828	Chapel to Clare Priory More images	Q17526806
Half Moon House	II	2, High Street	house		19 December 1961	TL7694645266; 52°04′39″N 0°34′50″E		1031742	Half Moon House More images	Q26283130
3, High Street	II	3, High Street			19 December 1961	TL7694145277; 52°04′39″N 0°34′50″E		1285576	3, High Street More images	Q26574258
The Swan Inn	II*	4, High Street	inn		19 December 1961	TL7693945293; 52°04′40″N 0°34′50″E		1031743	The Swan Inn More images	Q17545306
5, High Street	II	5, High Street			20 May 1974	TL7693745303; 52°04′40″N 0°34′50″E		1031744	5, High Street More images	Q26283131
6, High Street	II	6, High Street			20 May 1974	TL7693645313; 52°04′40″N 0°34′50″E		1194687	6, High Street More images	Q26489301
7 and 8, High Street	II	7 and 8, High Street			20 May 1974	TL7693445322; 52°04′41″N 0°34′50″E		1031745	7 and 8, High Street More images	Q26283132
11-13, High Street	II*	11-13, High Street	building		19 December 1961	TL7692745346; 52°04′42″N 0°34′50″E		1194690	11-13, High Street More images	Q17545464
The Vicarage	II*	15, High Street			19 December 1961	TL7692445397; 52°04′43″N 0°34′50″E		1031746	The Vicarage More images	Q17545311
Galloway House	II	16, High Street			19 December 1961	TL7692345420; 52°04′44″N 0°34′49″E		1031747	Galloway House More images	Q26283133
17-19, High Street	II	17-19, High Street			20 May 1974	TL7692245439; 52°04′45″N 0°34′49″E		1194706	17-19, High Street More images	Q26489319
20 and 21, High Street	II	20 and 21, High Street			19 December 1961	TL7691945454; 52°04′45″N 0°34′49″E		1031748	20 and 21, High Street More images	Q26283134
22, High Street	II	22, High Street			19 December 1961	TL7692045469; 52°04′46″N 0°34′49″E		1031749	22, High Street More images	Q26283135
Church Farmhouse	II*	23, High Street			19 December 1961	TL7691945489; 52°04′46″N 0°34′49″E		1285562	Church Farmhouse More images	Q17545651
27, High Street	II	27, High Street			19 December 1961	TL7694845386; 52°04′43″N 0°34′51″E		1285573	27, High Street More images	Q26574255
28 and 29, High Street	II	28 and 29, High Street			20 May 1974	TL7695345320; 52°04′41″N 0°34′51″E		1031707	28 and 29, High Street More images	Q26283095
31, High Street	II	31, High Street			20 May 1974	TL7696645277; 52°04′39″N 0°34′51″E		1031708	31, High Street More images	Q26283096
Baptist Chapel	II	High Street	chapel		20 May 1974	TL7689945532; 52°04′48″N 0°34′48″E		1194735	Baptist Chapel More images	Q26489348
Dovecote at Church Farm	II	High Street			20 May 1974	TL7681445463; 52°04′45″N 0°34′44″E		1031750	Upload Photo	Q26283136
The Ancient House	I	High Street	local museum		20 February 1958	TL7694445415; 52°04′44″N 0°34′51″E		1376700	The Ancient House More images	Q4752861
Wall to the Vicarage	II	High Street			20 May 1974	TL7692645413; 52°04′44″N 0°34′50″E		1194695	Wall to the Vicarage More images	Q26489308
Clare Station and Platform Shelter	II	Malting Lane, CO10 8NW			19 February 2013	TL7719345182; 52°04′36″N 0°35′03″E		1412333	Clare Station and Platform Shelter More images	Q26676268
Goods Shed at Clare Railway Station	II	Malting Lane, CO10 8NW			19 February 2013	TL7707045153; 52°04′35″N 0°34′57″E		1413396	Goods Shed at Clare Railway Station More images	Q26676339
Beverley House	II	1, Market Hill			20 May 1974	TL7698045305; 52°04′40″N 0°34′52″E		1031709	Beverley House More images	Q26283097
Brundon	II	2, Market Hill			20 May 1974	TL7698045313; 52°04′40″N 0°34′52″E		1376682	Brundon More images	Q26657213
3, Market Hill	II	3, Market Hill			20 May 1974	TL7698045319; 52°04′41″N 0°34′52″E		1031710	3, Market Hill More images	Q26283098
4 Market Hill	II	4, Market Hill			19 December 1961	TL7697845327; 52°04′41″N 0°34′52″E		1031711	4 Market Hill More images	Q26283099
5, Market Hill	II	5, Market Hill			20 May 1974	TL7697645339; 52°04′41″N 0°34′52″E		1376683	5, Market Hill More images	Q26657214
Orbells Garage	II	6, Market Hill			20 May 1974	TL7697245349; 52°04′42″N 0°34′52″E		1031712	Orbells Garage More images	Q26283100
7 and 8, Market Hill	II	7 and 8, Market Hill			20 May 1974	TL7697245361; 52°04′42″N 0°34′52″E		1376684	7 and 8, Market Hill More images	Q26657215
9, Market Hill	II	9, Market Hill			19 December 1961	TL7697745396; 52°04′43″N 0°34′52″E		1031713	9, Market Hill More images	Q26283102
10, Market Hill	II	10, Market Hill			19 December 1961	TL7698445395; 52°04′43″N 0°34′53″E		1194788	10, Market Hill More images	Q26489403
11, Market Hill	II	11, Market Hill			19 December 1961	TL7699145398; 52°04′43″N 0°34′53″E		1031714	11, Market Hill More images	Q26283103
Bell Hotel	II	12, Market Hill	hotel		19 December 1961	TL7701245392; 52°04′43″N 0°34′54″E		1194809	Bell Hotel More images	Q26489426
Hope Cottage	II	13, Market Hill			19 December 1961	TL7701445376; 52°04′42″N 0°34′54″E		1376685	Hope Cottage More images	Q26657216
14, Market Hill	II	14, Market Hill			19 December 1961	TL7701245372; 52°04′42″N 0°34′54″E		1180336	14, Market Hill More images	Q26475546
15, Market Hill	II	15, Market Hill			19 December 1961	TL7701345366; 52°04′42″N 0°34′54″E		1031715	15, Market Hill More images	Q26283104
16, Market Hill	II	16, Market Hill			19 December 1961	TL7701345361; 52°04′42″N 0°34′54″E		1180346	16, Market Hill More images	Q26475556
17, Market Hill	II	17, Market Hill			20 May 1974	TL7700245355; 52°04′42″N 0°34′54″E		1376686	17, Market Hill More images	Q26657217
Lloyds Bank	II	18, Market Hill	bank building		20 May 1974	TL7700445333; 52°04′41″N 0°34′54″E		1031716	Lloyds Bank More images	Q26283105
The Old Bear and Crown Hotel	II*	20, Market Hill	hotel		19 December 1961	TL7700445310; 52°04′40″N 0°34′54″E		1285511	The Old Bear and Crown Hotel More images	Q17545645
Clare War Memorial	II	Market Hill, Sudbury	war memorial		9 November 2016	TL7698845373; 52°04′42″N 0°34′53″E		1436461	Clare War Memorial More images	Q66477707
K6 Telephone Kiosk (between Lloyd's Bank and the Old Bear and Crown Public House)	II	Market Hill			11 May 1989	TL7700545323; 52°04′41″N 0°34′54″E		1236255	K6 Telephone Kiosk (between Lloyd's Bank and the Old Bear and Crown Public House) More images	Q26529500
Mill House	II	Mill Road			20 May 1974	TL7742645140; 52°04′34″N 0°35′15″E		1376687	Upload Photo	Q26657218
2, Nethergate Street	II	2, Nethergate Street			19 December 1961	TL7692945202; 52°04′37″N 0°34′49″E		1180382	2, Nethergate Street More images	Q26475604
Rochford	II	4, Nethergate Street			19 December 1961	TL7690445176; 52°04′36″N 0°34′48″E		1031718	Upload Photo	Q26283107
Clarence House	II	5, Nethergate Street			19 December 1961	TL7689645166; 52°04′36″N 0°34′48″E		1180429	Clarence House More images	Q26475664
Medina House	II	6, Nethergate Street			19 December 1961	TL7688645159; 52°04′36″N 0°34′47″E		1376688	Upload Photo	Q26657219
Nethergate Hotel	I	8, Nethergate Street	hotel		19 December 1961	TL7686645130; 52°04′35″N 0°34′46″E		1031719	Nethergate Hotel More images	Q17526573
White House	II	9, Nethergate Street			19 December 1961	TL7685345112; 52°04′34″N 0°34′45″E		1180452	White House More images	Q26475696
Verandah House	II*	10, Nethergate Street	house		19 December 1961	TL7674244969; 52°04′30″N 0°34′39″E		1376689	Verandah House More images	Q17545771
Cliftons	I	11, Nethergate Street	building		19 December 1961	TL7675245043; 52°04′32″N 0°34′40″E		1180531	Cliftons More images	Q17526609
13, Nethergate Street	II	13, Nethergate Street			19 December 1961	TL7677945079; 52°04′33″N 0°34′41″E		1285405	13, Nethergate Street More images	Q26574100
14, Nethergate Street	II	14, Nethergate Street			19 December 1961	TL7678945088; 52°04′33″N 0°34′42″E		1031721	14, Nethergate Street More images	Q26283110
Netheridge	II*	15, Nethergate Street	building		19 December 1961	TL7679345102; 52°04′34″N 0°34′42″E		1180568	Netheridge More images	Q17545386
Red House	II*	17, Nethergate Street	house		19 December 1961	TL7680445116; 52°04′34″N 0°34′43″E		1031722	Red House More images	Q17540701
18, Nethergate Street	II	18, Nethergate Street			19 December 1961	TL7681745123; 52°04′34″N 0°34′43″E		1031723	18, Nethergate Street More images	Q26283111
Richmond House	II	20 Nethergate Street			19 December 1961	TL7683545145; 52°04′35″N 0°34′44″E		1031724	Richmond House More images	Q26283112
23, Nethergate Street	II	23, Nethergate Street			19 December 1961	TL7685645164; 52°04′36″N 0°34′46″E		1031725	23, Nethergate Street More images	Q26283113
24-6, Nethergate Street	II	24-6, Nethergate Street			19 December 1961	TL7686945175; 52°04′36″N 0°34′46″E		1180612	24-6, Nethergate Street More images	Q26475895
39 and 40, Nethergate Street	II	39 and 40, Nethergate Street			19 December 1961	TL7694245241; 52°04′38″N 0°34′50″E		1031727	39 and 40, Nethergate Street More images	Q26283115
Post Office and House, 1 High Street and 41 Nethergate Street	II	41 Nethergate Street			19 December 1961	TL7695445251; 52°04′38″N 0°34′51″E		1194646	Post Office and House, 1 High Street and 41 Nethergate Street More images	Q26489262
Barns at Cliftons	II	Nethergate Street			20 May 1974	TL7671845095; 52°04′34″N 0°34′38″E		1031720	Upload Photo	Q26283108
No 22 and Orchard House	II	Nethergate Street			19 December 1961	TL7684445154; 52°04′35″N 0°34′45″E		1180589	No 22 and Orchard House More images	Q26475866
Rose and Crown Public House	II	Nethergate Street			19 December 1961	TL7682545134; 52°04′35″N 0°34′44″E		1180579	Rose and Crown Public House More images	Q26475852
Stone Hall (clare Rural District Council Offices)	II	Nethergate Street			19 December 1961	TL7691145214; 52°04′37″N 0°34′48″E		1031726	Stone Hall (clare Rural District Council Offices) More images	Q26283114
3-7, Station Road	II	3-7, Station Road			20 May 1974	TL7704845317; 52°04′40″N 0°34′56″E		1031728	3-7, Station Road	Q26283116
8 and 9, Station Road	II	8 and 9, Station Road			20 May 1974	TL7705445301; 52°04′40″N 0°34′56″E		1180660	8 and 9, Station Road More images	Q26475955
Halfway House Farmhouse	II	Stoke Road			19 December 1961	TL7516244677; 52°04′22″N 0°33′16″E		1031685	Upload Photo	Q26283073
Riverside	II*	Stoke Road			19 December 1961	TL7664344870; 52°04′26″N 0°34′34″E		1285380	Upload Photo	Q17545634
Stour House	II*	Stoke Road	house		19 December 1961	TL7668444907; 52°04′28″N 0°34′36″E		1031729	Stour House More images	Q17540710
Premises Occupied by Charles Boardman and Son, Saddlers Cottage and Premises Occupied by P Carrington	II	Well Lane			19 December 1961	TL7700345280; 52°04′39″N 0°34′53″E		1376711	Premises Occupied by Charles Boardman and Son, Saddlers Cottage and Premises Occupied by P Carrington More images	Q26657240
4-7, Well Lane	II	4-7, Well Lane, CO10 8NH			15 May 1970	TL7698245289; 52°04′40″N 0°34′52″E		1376721	4-7, Well Lane More images	Q26657249
Commerce House (wt Ward)	II	Well Lane			19 December 1961	TL7697645255; 52°04′39″N 0°34′52″E		1376712	Commerce House (wt Ward) More images	Q26657241
Membury House and Adjoining Premises	II	Well Lane			19 December 1961	TL7699145273; 52°04′39″N 0°34′53″E		1031687	Membury House and Adjoining Premises More images	Q26283075
Moot Hall	II	Well Lane			19 December 1961	TL7700945286; 52°04′39″N 0°34′54″E		1031686	Moot Hall More images	Q26283074
Premises Occupied by SW Vosper (greengrocer)	II	Well Lane			19 December 1961	TL7697345280; 52°04′39″N 0°34′52″E		1376710	Premises Occupied by SW Vosper (greengrocer) More images	Q26657239
The Pharmacy	II	Well Lane			19 December 1961	TL7698645264; 52°04′39″N 0°34′53″E		1031688	Upload Photo	Q26283076

== See also ==
- Grade I listed buildings in Suffolk
- Grade II* listed buildings in Suffolk

== Sources ==
- Bettely, James; Pevsner, Nikolaus (2015) [1961], Suffolk: West, The Buildings of England, New Haven and London: Yale University Press, ISBN 978-0-300-19655-9
