= Listed buildings in Haverhill, Suffolk =

Civil Parish in Suffolk, England

Haverhill is a town and civil parish in the West Suffolk District of Suffolk, England. It contains 36 listed buildings that are recorded in the National Heritage List for England. Of these three are grade II* and 33 are grade II.

This list is based on the information retrieved online from Historic England.

== Key ==
Grade	Criteria
I	Buildings that are of exceptional interest
II*	Particularly important buildings of more than special interest
II	Buildings that are of special interest

== Listing ==
Name	Grade	Location	Type	Completed (Note: The date given is the date used by Historic England as significant for the initial building or that of an important part in the structure's description.)	Date designated	Grid ref. (Note: The grid reference is based on the British national grid reference system, sometimes known as OSGB36, used by the Ordnance Survey.) Geo-coordinates	Notes	Entry number (Note: The "List Entry Number" is a unique number assigned to each listed building and scheduled monument by Historic England.)	Image	Wikidata
Cowslip Pightle (number 2)	II	1 and 2, Burton End, Hazel Stub			9 May 1973	TL6549645051; 52°04′45″N 0°24′49″E		1375502	Upload Photo	Q26656298
78, Burton End	II	78, Burton End			24 February 1993	TL6649145372; 52°04′54″N 0°25′42″E		1375500	Upload Photo	Q26656296
Rope House	II	117, Burton End			9 May 1973	TL6602545230; 52°04′50″N 0°25′17″E		1375501	Upload Photo	Q26656297
Hazel Stub Farm	II	Burton End, Hazel Stub			19 November 1993	TL6551144994; 52°04′43″N 0°24′50″E		1375503	Upload Photo	Q26656299
18 and 20, Camps Road	II	18 and 20, Camps Road			9 May 1973	TL6693845492; 52°04′57″N 0°26′06″E		1375504	Upload Photo	Q26656300
The Thatches	II	22, Camps Road			9 May 1973	TL6692945490; 52°04′57″N 0°26′05″E		1375505	Upload Photo	Q26656301
Heazworth House	II	19, Hamlet Road			9 May 1973	TL6756645100; 52°04′44″N 0°26′38″E		1375506	Upload Photo	Q26656302
Hamlet House and Railings to Front Steps	II	35, Hamlet Road			26 June 1952	TL6772744921; 52°04′38″N 0°26′46″E		1375507	Upload Photo	Q26656303
Anne of Cleves House	II*	Hamlet Road	architectural structure		26 June 1952	TL6756045068; 52°04′43″N 0°26′37″E		1375508	Anne of Cleves House More images	Q17545751
Front Garden Wall to Vicarage Approximately 7 Metres to East (vicarage Not Included)	II	Hamlet Road			9 May 1973	TL6758445052; 52°04′42″N 0°26′39″E		1375511	Upload Photo	Q26656305
Garden Wall Approximately 5 Metres South West of Weavers	II	Hamlet Road			9 May 1973	TL6749045117; 52°04′45″N 0°26′34″E		1375513	Upload Photo	Q26656307
Old Independent Church	II*	Hamlet Road	church building		9 May 1973	TL6751045161; 52°04′46″N 0°26′35″E		1375509	Old Independent Church More images	Q17545756
Schoolroom and Meeting Hall	II	Hamlet Road			9 May 1973	TL6752445182; 52°04′47″N 0°26′36″E		1375510	Upload Photo	Q26656304
Weavers	II	Hamlet Road			9 May 1973	TL6748545147; 52°04′46″N 0°26′34″E		1375512	Upload Photo	Q26656306
Hanchet End Cottage	II	Hanchet End			9 May 1973	TL6516546447; 52°05′30″N 0°24′34″E		1375498	Upload Photo	Q26656294
Hanchet End Farmhouse	II	Hanchet End			7 November 1996	TL6501046323; 52°05′26″N 0°24′26″E		1375499	Upload Photo	Q26656295
Barn Approximately 10 Metres West of Haverhill Hall	II	Helion Bumpstead Road			9 May 1973	TL6630644152; 52°04′15″N 0°25′30″E		1375515	Upload Photo	Q26656309
Haverhill Hall	II	Helion Bumpstead Road			9 May 1973	TL6635844146; 52°04′15″N 0°25′33″E		1375514	Upload Photo	Q26656308
2 and 4, High Street	II	2 and 4, High Street			9 May 1973	TL6718445491; 52°04′57″N 0°26′19″E		1375516	Upload Photo	Q26656310
Barclays Bank	II	39, High Street			26 June 1952	TL6728745417; 52°04′55″N 0°26′24″E		1375517	Upload Photo	Q26656311
72, High Street	II	72, High Street			1 October 1985	TL6741645209; 52°04′48″N 0°26′30″E		1375518	Upload Photo	Q26656312
Chauntry Clothing Mills	II	High Street			9 May 1973	TL6715145416; 52°04′55″N 0°26′17″E		1375519	Upload Photo	Q26656313
Church of St Mary	II*	High Street	church building		26 June 1952	TL6715345520; 52°04′58″N 0°26′17″E		1375520	Church of St Mary More images	Q17545760
Town Hall Arts Centre	II	High Street			9 May 1973	TL6733745299; 52°04′51″N 0°26′26″E		1375521	Upload Photo	Q26656314
1 and 2, Quakers Lane	II	1 and 2, Quakers Lane			9 May 1973	TL6721645406; 52°04′54″N 0°26′20″E		1375522	Upload Photo	Q26656315
Woolpack Inn	II	52, Queen Street	pub		9 May 1973	TL6706345710; 52°05′04″N 0°26′13″E		1375523	Woolpack Inn More images	Q26656316
Queens Head Public House	II	Queen Street			4 November 1997	TL6711545604; 52°05′01″N 0°26′15″E		1375525	Upload Photo	Q26656318
The Sturmer Arches	II	Sturmer Road			9 May 1973	TL6797944775; 52°04′33″N 0°26′59″E		1375527	Upload Photo	Q26656320
Vale Place	II	Sturmer Road			26 June 1952	TL6788544782; 52°04′33″N 0°26′54″E		1375528	Upload Photo	Q26656321
Wall Approximately 40 Metres East of Vale Place	II	Sturmer Road			9 May 1973	TL6793344778; 52°04′33″N 0°26′57″E		1375529	Upload Photo	Q26656322
Baptist Chapel	II	Upper Downs Slade	chapel		26 June 1952	TL6699745550; 52°04′59″N 0°26′09″E		1375530	Baptist Chapel More images	Q26656323
Corn Exchange	II	Withersfield Road	corn exchange		9 May 1973	TL6699145749; 52°05′06″N 0°26′09″E		1375531	Corn Exchange More images	Q26656324
Haverhill War Memorial	II	Withersfield Road, CB9 9HY	war memorial		21 February 2017	TL6671345809; 52°05′08″N 0°25′54″E		1441787	Haverhill War Memorial More images	Q66478377
Rose and Crown Hotel	II	Withersfield Road			26 June 1952	TL6701945721; 52°05′05″N 0°26′10″E		1375532	Upload Photo	Q26656325
The Cangle County Primary School	II	Withersfield Road			9 May 1973	TL6702545775; 52°05′06″N 0°26′11″E		1375533	Upload Photo	Q26656326
Chapel Farm Cottage	II	Wratting Road			9 May 1973	TL6739646703; 52°05′36″N 0°26′32″E		1375534	Upload Photo	Q26656327

== See also ==
- Grade I listed buildings in Suffolk
- Grade II* listed buildings in Suffolk

== Sources ==
- Bettely, James; Pevsner, Nikolaus (2015) [1961], Suffolk: West, The Buildings of England, New Haven and London: Yale University Press, ISBN 978-0-300-19655-9
