= Listed buildings in Newmarket, Suffolk =

Historic structures in Suffolk, England

Newmarket is a town and civil parish in the West Suffolk District of Suffolk, England. It contains 109 listed buildings that are recorded in the National Heritage List for England. Of these four are grade II* and 105 are grade II.

This list is based on the information retrieved online from Historic England.

== Key ==
Grade	Criteria
I	Buildings that are of exceptional interest
II*	Particularly important buildings of more than special interest
II	Buildings that are of special interest

== Listing ==
Name	Grade	Location	Type	Completed (Note: The date given is the date used by Historic England as significant for the initial building or that of an important part in the structure's description.)	Date designated	Grid ref. (Note: The grid reference is based on the British national grid reference system, sometimes known as OSGB36, used by the Ordnance Survey.) Geo-coordinates	Notes	Entry number (Note: The "List Entry Number" is a unique number assigned to each listed building and scheduled monument by Historic England.)	Image	Wikidata
South Lodge and Attached Gate Piers	II	1 Duchess Drive Newmarket Suffolk CB8 8AG, CB8 8AG			26 June 1984	TL6539362962; 52°14′24″N 0°25′15″E		1374826	Upload Photo	Q26655662
Soham House	II	CB8 7DN			10 April 2017	TL6446264658; 52°15′20″N 0°24′29″E		1443694	Upload Photo	Q66478570
Church of All Saints	II	All Saints Road	church building		28 November 1950	TL6444063272; 52°14′35″N 0°24′25″E		1193518	Church of All Saints More images	Q26488176
Sefton Lodge	II	8, Bury Road			6 August 1999	TL6492163882; 52°14′54″N 0°24′52″E		1388305	Upload Photo	Q26667861
Sefton Lodge Stables and Trainers Cottage	II	10, Bury Road			6 August 1999	TL6494863937; 52°14′56″N 0°24′53″E		1388307	Upload Photo	Q26667862
Bedford Lodge Hotel	II	11, Bury Road			30 October 2006	TL6496464189; 52°15′04″N 0°24′55″E		1392777	Upload Photo	Q26671987
Abington Place and Abington Place Stables	II	44, Bury Road			30 October 2006	TL6545564535; 52°15′15″N 0°25′21″E		1392767	Upload Photo	Q26671975
Bedford House Stables	II	Bury Road			30 October 2006	TL6491464030; 52°14′59″N 0°24′52″E		1392768	Upload Photo	Q23018592
Church of St Agnes	II*	Bury Road	church building		26 June 1984	TL6501764006; 52°14′58″N 0°24′57″E		1037643	Church of St Agnes More images	Q17534828
Entrance Gateway and Gates at No.44 (abington Place Stables)	II	Bury Road			30 October 2006	TL6540664504; 52°15′14″N 0°25′19″E		1392766	Upload Photo	Q26671974
Highfield Stables	II	Bury Road			19 October 1994	TL6500864242; 52°15′06″N 0°24′57″E		1263720	Upload Photo	Q26554491
Newmarket War Memorial	II	Bury Road, Junction With Fordham Road, CB8 7BP	war memorial		22 February 2018	TL6458463613; 52°14′46″N 0°24′34″E		1453400	Newmarket War Memorial More images	Q66479393
Range of Stables in East Corner of Front Paddock Bordering Road at Shalfleet Stables	II	Bury Road			30 October 2006	TL6510964268; 52°15′07″N 0°25′02″E		1392769	Upload Photo	Q26671977
Brickfield Stud	II	Cemetery Hill, Exning, CB8 7JH			7 December 2023	TL6272265212; 52°15′40″N 0°22′58″E		1487747	Upload Photo	Q126688945
The Bushel Public House	II	Drapery Row	pub		28 November 1950	TL6431663442; 52°14′41″N 0°24′19″E		1193792	The Bushel Public House More images	Q26488438
Exeter House and Exeter House Stables Including Central Lamp Post	II	Exeter Road			30 October 2006	TL6425363673; 52°14′48″N 0°24′16″E		1392771	Upload Photo	Q26671980
Newmarket General Hospital	II	Exning Road	hospital building		26 June 1984	TL6376764160; 52°15′04″N 0°23′52″E		1193799	Newmarket General Hospital More images	Q26488445
The Mount Public House	II	Exning Road			26 June 1984	TL6406363706; 52°14′49″N 0°24′06″E		1037649	Upload Photo	Q26289366
Bloomsbury Cottage and Attached Stables	II	7, Fitzroy Street			30 October 2006	TL6404163311; 52°14′37″N 0°24′05″E		1392764	Upload Photo	Q26671972
The Grosvenor Arms Public House	II	Grosvenor Yard			26 June 1984	TL6412363234; 52°14′34″N 0°24′09″E		1351289	Upload Photo	Q26634406
29, High Street	II	29, High Street	building		26 June 1984	TL6451863464; 52°14′41″N 0°24′30″E		1351290	29, High Street More images	Q26634407
Waggon and Horses Public House	II	34, High Street	pub		10 March 1970	TL6449263496; 52°14′42″N 0°24′29″E		1037650	Waggon and Horses Public House More images	Q26289367
35 and 37, High Street	II	35 and 37, High Street			26 June 1984	TL6443963417; 52°14′40″N 0°24′26″E		1037659	Upload Photo	Q26289377
Cramphorns and Cartwrights	II	36-40, High Street			10 March 1970	TL6447563491; 52°14′42″N 0°24′28″E		1193865	Upload Photo	Q26488507
43-47, High Street	II	43-47, High Street			10 March 1970	TL6442863403; 52°14′39″N 0°24′25″E		1285897	Upload Photo	Q26574554
Barlcays Bank	II	58 and 60, High Street			28 November 1950	TL6440963458; 52°14′41″N 0°24′24″E		1037651	Upload Photo	Q26289368
75, High Street	II	75, High Street			28 November 1950	TL6437963331; 52°14′37″N 0°24′22″E		1351291	Upload Photo	Q26634408
84 and 86, High Street	II	84 and 86, High Street			26 June 1984	TL6434063387; 52°14′39″N 0°24′20″E		1037653	Upload Photo	Q26289370
86 and 88, High Street	II	86 and 88, High Street			26 June 1984	TL6433863378; 52°14′39″N 0°24′20″E		1193910	Upload Photo	Q26488551
87, High Street	II	87, High Street			26 June 1984	TL6433363278; 52°14′35″N 0°24′20″E		1037661	Upload Photo	Q26289379
94, High Street	II	94, High Street			26 June 1984	TL6433163373; 52°14′38″N 0°24′20″E		1037654	Upload Photo	Q26289371
105, High Street	II	105, High Street			26 June 1984	TL6423063234; 52°14′34″N 0°24′14″E		1037662	Upload Photo	Q26289380
Masonic Club Including Area Railings	II	115, High Street			10 March 1970	TL6416163207; 52°14′33″N 0°24′11″E		1194120	Upload Photo	Q26488749
121, High Street	II	121, High Street			10 March 1970	TL6407063147; 52°14′31″N 0°24′06″E		1351313	Upload Photo	Q26634428
123, High Street	II	123, High Street			26 June 1984	TL6405563141; 52°14′31″N 0°24′05″E		1037622	Upload Photo	Q26289336
Terrace House	II	125, High Street			10 March 1970	TL6404163131; 52°14′31″N 0°24′04″E		1037623	Upload Photo	Q26289338
152 and 154, High Street	II	152 and 154, High Street			26 June 1984	TL6413763227; 52°14′34″N 0°24′09″E		1285942	Upload Photo	Q26574594
Burchley House	II	164, High Street			26 June 1984	TL6410263209; 52°14′33″N 0°24′08″E		1037655	Upload Photo	Q26289373
Windsor House	II	184, High Street			26 June 1984	TL6401763146; 52°14′31″N 0°24′03″E		1193933	Upload Photo	Q26488573
Cranworth	II	186, High Street			26 June 1984	TL6400963142; 52°14′31″N 0°24′03″E		1037656	Upload Photo	Q26289374
Portland House	II	188, High Street			26 June 1984	TL6400663139; 52°14′31″N 0°24′02″E		1037657	Upload Photo	Q26289375
Stockbridge House	II	192, High Street			26 June 1984	TL6398563126; 52°14′31″N 0°24′01″E		1285916	Upload Photo	Q26574571
Clarendon House Including Railings	II	194, High Street			10 March 1970	TL6397463122; 52°14′31″N 0°24′01″E		1037658	Upload Photo	Q26289376
Queensbury Cottage	II	196, High Street			3 August 1995	TL6394963104; 52°14′30″N 0°23′59″E		1249492	Upload Photo	Q26541622
Queensbury Lodge and Attached Wall	II	198, High Street	architectural structure		8 June 1984	TL6391563086; 52°14′30″N 0°23′57″E		1193974	Queensbury Lodge and Attached Wall More images	Q26488614
Ashfords (york Buildings)	II	High Street			26 June 1984	TL6431163306; 52°14′36″N 0°24′19″E		1285883	Upload Photo	Q26574540
Boundary Walls and Gate Piers to Queensberry House	II	High Street			4 December 1987	TL6395863089; 52°14′30″N 0°24′00″E		1374824	Upload Photo	Q26655661
Brick Boundary Wall Extending North Eastwards from Number 119 High Street	II	High Street			26 June 1984	TL6411163182; 52°14′32″N 0°24′08″E		1351293	Upload Photo	Q26634410
Drinking Fountain	II	High Street	drinking fountain		10 March 1970	TL6372662952; 52°14′25″N 0°23′47″E		1351314	Drinking Fountain More images	Q26634429
Forge and Attached Office Immediately East of No.166 (not Included)	II	High Street			30 October 2006	TL6409063205; 52°14′33″N 0°24′07″E		1392765	Upload Photo	Q26671973
Horse Racing Museum	II	High Street			26 June 1984	TL6431363284; 52°14′36″N 0°24′19″E		1351292	Upload Photo	Q26634409
Jubilee Clock Tower	II	High Street			26 June 1984	TL6457263547; 52°14′44″N 0°24′33″E		1285983	Upload Photo	Q26574628
Number 119 (lushington House) and Number 119a	II	119a, High Street			10 March 1970	TL6408463158; 52°14′32″N 0°24′07″E		1037621	Upload Photo	Q26289335
Number 85 and Moons	II	High Street			26 June 1984	TL6434763286; 52°14′36″N 0°24′21″E		1037660	Upload Photo	Q26289378
Queensbrry House	II	High Street			4 December 1987	TL6396463071; 52°14′29″N 0°24′00″E		1249462	Upload Photo	Q26541594
Queensbury Stables and Yard Wall	II	High Street			3 August 1995	TL6393663143; 52°14′31″N 0°23′59″E		1249493	Upload Photo	Q26541623
Rutland Arms Hotel	II	High Street	hotel		28 November 1950	TL6447263415; 52°14′40″N 0°24′27″E		1193987	Rutland Arms Hotel More images	Q26488626
The Bull Public House	II	High Street	pub		26 June 1984	TL6440063428; 52°14′40″N 0°24′24″E		1193890	The Bull Public House More images	Q26488531
The Jockey Club	II	High Street			16 January 1981	TL6430663252; 52°14′35″N 0°24′18″E		1285869	Upload Photo	Q26574527
The Old Bank House at Rear of Numbers 58 and 60 (barclays Bank)	II	High Street			26 June 1984	TL6439863480; 52°14′42″N 0°24′24″E		1037652	Upload Photo	Q26289369
Marlborough Club	II	Kingston Passage			26 June 1984	TL6436963286; 52°14′36″N 0°24′22″E		1037624	Upload Photo	Q26289339
Palace House Stables and Trainer's House Including Fountain, Lamp Standard and Former Dung Pits	II	Lamp Standard And Former Dung Pits, Palace Street			30 October 2006	TL6448063319; 52°14′37″N 0°24′28″E		1392780	Upload Photo	Q26541621
Number 4 (north West Part)	II	5 and 6, Market Street			26 June 1984	TL6436763431; 52°14′40″N 0°24′22″E		1351315	Upload Photo	Q26634430
Numbers 3 and 4 (south East Part)	II	Market Street			26 June 1984	TL6437363422; 52°14′40″N 0°24′22″E		1037625	Upload Photo	Q26289341
Berners House	II	2, Mill Hill			26 June 1984	TL6417063546; 52°14′44″N 0°24′12″E		1037640	Upload Photo	Q26289358
Albert House	II	Moulton Road			26 June 1984	TL6463763562; 52°14′44″N 0°24′36″E		1037626	Upload Photo	Q26289342
Albert House Stables Including Boundary Wall	II	Moulton Road			12 March 1997	TL6464963588; 52°14′45″N 0°24′37″E		1257700	Upload Photo	Q26549032
Range of Stables on North Side of Stable Yard at Heath House Stables	II	Moulton Road			30 October 2006	TL6475163673; 52°14′48″N 0°24′43″E		1392772	Upload Photo	Q26671981
Range of Stables on West Side of Stable Yard at Heath House Stables	II	Moulton Road			30 October 2006	TL6474363604; 52°14′45″N 0°24′42″E		1392773	Upload Photo	Q26671982
Southfields Rubbing House	II	Newmarket Heath			30 October 2006	TL6044863126; 52°14′35″N 0°20′55″E		1392757	Upload Photo	Q26671965
4 Piers and Walling Attached to East Side of Number 31	II	4 Piers And Walling Attached To East Side Of Number 31, Old Station Road			26 June 1984	TL6477463485; 52°14′42″N 0°24′43″E		1194376	Upload Photo	Q26489002
Ashley House and Stable Wing Behind	II	13, Old Station Road			26 June 1984	TL6468563523; 52°14′43″N 0°24′39″E		1351317	Upload Photo	Q26634432
Cadland House and Cadland House Stables	II	35, Old Station Road			30 October 2006	TL6480863550; 52°14′44″N 0°24′45″E		1392770	Upload Photo	Q26671978
Wroughton House	II	37, Old Station Road			26 June 1984	TL6480463485; 52°14′42″N 0°24′45″E		1392858	Upload Photo	Q26672060
Cleveland House	II*	Old Station Road			10 March 1970	TL6483763476; 52°14′41″N 0°24′47″E		1351318	Upload Photo	Q17534946
Machell Place	II	Old Station Road			30 October 2006	TL6491163397; 52°14′39″N 0°24′50″E		1392774	Upload Photo	Q26671983
Machell Place Stables	II	Old Station Road			30 October 2006	TL6489263335; 52°14′37″N 0°24′49″E		1392779	Upload Photo	Q26671989
Two Stable Ranges, One Attached to and the Other Immediately North of Wroughton House	II	One Attached To And The Other Immediately North Of Wroughton House, Old Station Road			30 October 2006	TL6480063503; 52°14′42″N 0°24′45″E		1393003	Upload Photo	Q26672198
Gwynne Cottage Nell Gwynnes House	II	4, Palace Street			28 November 1950	TL6447663386; 52°14′39″N 0°24′28″E		1037630	Upload Photo	Q26289348
Palace House Stables and Trainers House	II	Palace Street			13 October 1989	TL6448063320; 52°14′37″N 0°24′28″E		1249491	Upload Photo	Q26541621
Palace House and Entrance Steps	II*	Palace Street, CB8 8EP			26 June 1984	TL6443363358; 52°14′38″N 0°24′25″E		1285676	Upload Photo	Q17534913
4 and 6, Park Lane	II	4 and 6, Park Lane			26 June 1984	TL6440963290; 52°14′36″N 0°24′24″E		1194476	Upload Photo	Q26489101
Tattershalls Arch	II	Park Paddocks			10 March 1970	TL6420462949; 52°14′25″N 0°24′12″E		1037632	Upload Photo	Q26289350
The Fox Rotunda	II	Park Paddocks			26 June 1984	TL6413163036; 52°14′28″N 0°24′09″E		1037631	Upload Photo	Q26289349
Boyce House	II	Sackville Street			10 March 1970	TL6473763529; 52°14′43″N 0°24′42″E		1194510	Upload Photo	Q26489132
Chesterfield House Shagbag Coltings and Stable Range	II	Sackville Street			26 June 1984	TL6474263558; 52°14′44″N 0°24′42″E		1285666	Upload Photo	Q26574340
Eagle House	II	Sackville Street			26 June 1984	TL6471863531; 52°14′43″N 0°24′41″E		1194507	Upload Photo	Q26489129
Havelock House	II	Sackville Street			26 June 1984	TL6472863531; 52°14′43″N 0°24′41″E		1037633	Upload Photo	Q26289352
Sackville House	II	Sackville Street			30 October 2006	TL6476363534; 52°14′43″N 0°24′43″E		1392781	Upload Photo	Q26671991
Sackville House Stables	II	Sackville Street			30 October 2006	TL6478063536; 52°14′43″N 0°24′44″E		1392775	Upload Photo	Q26671984
Sandover House and Stafford House	II	12 and 13, St Mary's Square			26 June 1984	TL6416963534; 52°14′44″N 0°24′12″E		1194716	Upload Photo	Q26489330
The Five Bells Public House	II	16, St Mary's Square			26 June 1984	TL6418763511; 52°14′43″N 0°24′13″E		1194522	Upload Photo	Q26489143
Clermont House and Bevys House	II	18, St Mary's Square			26 June 1984	TL6419363503; 52°14′43″N 0°24′13″E		1351319	Upload Photo	Q26634433
Brooks Place	II	22-25, St Mary's Square			26 June 1984	TL6416363466; 52°14′42″N 0°24′11″E		1037635	Upload Photo	Q26289353
10 Limestone Headstones Between 6 and 15m West of Church of St Mary	II	10 Limestone Headstones Between 6 and 15m West Of Church Of St Mary, St Marys Square			26 June 1984	TL6409063405; 52°14′40″N 0°24′07″E		1194527	Upload Photo	Q26489149
Church of St Mary	II*	St Marys Square	church building		28 November 1950	TL6412563419; 52°14′40″N 0°24′09″E		1037636	Church of St Mary More images	Q17534817
Godophin House and the Scotch Tea Rooms Including Area Railings	II	2, The Avenue			10 March 1970	TL6418563210; 52°14′33″N 0°24′12″E		1037641	Upload Photo	Q26289359
Covered Ride	II	The Water Course			30 October 2006	TL6422563617; 52°14′46″N 0°24′15″E		1392778	Upload Photo	Q26671988
Rous Memorial Cottages (north Wing)	II	1-4, Vicarage Road			10 March 1970	TL6479263451; 52°14′40″N 0°24′44″E		1374822	Upload Photo	Q26655659
Rous Memorial Cottages (south Wing)	II	5-8, Vicarage Road			10 March 1970	TL6477863412; 52°14′39″N 0°24′44″E		1194658	Upload Photo	Q26489273
Gates and Gatepiers 40 Metres East of Rous Memeorial Hospital (centre Block)	II	Vicarage Road			10 March 1970	TL6480863422; 52°14′40″N 0°24′45″E		1037637	Upload Photo	Q26289354
Rous Memorial Hospital (centre Block)	II	Vicarage Road			10 March 1970	TL6476063435; 52°14′40″N 0°24′43″E		1194618	Upload Photo	Q26489236
Chilham Cottage , Norwood House and Hogg's	II	Wellington Street			26 June 1984	TL6418663471; 52°14′42″N 0°24′12″E		1037638	Upload Photo	Q26289356
Crawford House and St Aubyn's	II	Wellington Street, CB8 0HT			26 June 1984	TL6419263460; 52°14′41″N 0°24′13″E		1194673	Upload Photo	Q26489288
Cut Sew Fabrics	II	Wellington Street			26 June 1984	TL6428063375; 52°14′39″N 0°24′17″E		1194693	Upload Photo	Q26489306
D's Fabrics Internation Progressive Travel Jock's the Wellington Diner	II	Wellington Street			26 June 1984	TL6429163366; 52°14′38″N 0°24′18″E		1037639	Upload Photo	Q26289357
Entrance Gate Piers and Gates 20m South West of Foley House	II	Wellington Street			10 March 1970	TL6420663480; 52°14′42″N 0°24′13″E		1374823	Upload Photo	Q26655660
Osborne House, with Attached Railings, and Osborne House Stables Including Osborne Cottage	II	With Attached Railings, And Osborne House Stables Including Osborne Cottage, Moulton Road			30 October 2006	TL6480663578; 52°14′45″N 0°24′45″E		1393002	Upload Photo	Q26672197

== See also ==
- Grade I listed buildings in Suffolk
- Grade II* listed buildings in Suffolk

== Sources ==
- Bettely, James; Pevsner, Nikolaus (2015) [1961], Suffolk: West, The Buildings of England, New Haven and London: Yale University Press, ISBN 978-0-300-19655-9
