= Grade II* listed buildings in Suffolk =

Districts of Suffolk
1 Ipswich
2 East Suffolk
3 Mid Suffolk
4 Babergh
5 West Suffolk

The county of Suffolk is divided into five districts. The districts of Suffolk are Ipswich, East Suffolk, Mid Suffolk, Babergh, and West Suffolk.

As there are 800 Grade II* listed buildings in the county they have been split into separate lists for each district.

- Grade II* listed buildings in Babergh
- Grade II* listed buildings in Ipswich
- Grade II* listed buildings in Mid Suffolk
- West Suffolk
  - Grade II* listed buildings in St Edmundsbury (borough)
  - Grade II* listed buildings in Forest Heath
- East Suffolk
  - Grade II* listed buildings in Suffolk Coastal
  - Grade II* listed buildings in Waveney

== See also ==
- Grade I listed buildings in Suffolk
