= Grade I listed buildings in Suffolk =

Districts of Suffolk
1 Ipswich
2 East Suffolk
3 Mid Suffolk
4 Babergh
5 West Suffolk

As of April 2006 there were 410 Grade I listed buildings in Suffolk, England. In the United Kingdom, the term listed building refers to a building or other structure officially designated as being of "exceptional architectural or historic special interest"; Grade I structures are those considered to be "buildings of "exceptional interest, sometimes considered to be internationally important. Just 2.5% of listed buildings are Grade I." The total number of listed buildings in England is 372,905. In England, the authority for listing under the Planning (Listed Buildings and Conservation Areas) Act 1990 rests with English Heritage, a non-departmental public body sponsored by the Department for Culture, Media and Sport.

The non-metropolitan county of Suffolk consists of 5 districts: these are Ipswich, the capital, East Suffolk, Mid Suffolk, Babergh and West Suffolk.

The list has been divided into the following geographical areas, representing each all the Grade I listed buildings in a single district:

- Grade I listed buildings in Ipswich
- Grade I listed buildings in East Suffolk District
- Grade I listed buildings in Babergh
- Grade I listed buildings in Mid Suffolk
- Grade I listed buildings in Forest Heath (West Suffolk)
- Grade I listed buildings in St Edmundsbury (West Suffolk)
