= Babergh District Council elections =

Local government elections in Suffolk, England

Babergh District Council in Suffolk, England is elected every four years. Since the last boundary changes in 2019, 32 councillors have been elected from 24 wards.

== Council elections ==
Year	Conservative	Labour	Liberal Democrats (Note: Includes totals for the predecessors of the Liberal Democrats, the Liberal Party and SDP (both of which participated in the Alliance).)	Green	Independents & Others	Council control after election
Local government reorganisation; council established (38 seats)
1973	8	11	0	–	19	No overall control
1976	17	4	1	0	16	No overall control
New ward boundaries; seats increased from 38 to 42
1979	17	5	2	0	18	No overall control
1983	18	3	3	0	18	No overall control
1987	18	2	4	0	18	No overall control
1991 (Note: District boundary changes took place but the number of seats remained the same.)	15	6	5	0	16	No overall control
1995	9	12	7	0	14	No overall control
1999	10	5	13	0	14	No overall control
New ward boundaries; seats increased from 42 to 43
2003	11	6	18	0	8	No overall control
2007	19	0	16	0	8	No overall control
2011	18	3	12	0	10	No overall control
2015	31	1	3	0	8	Conservative
New ward boundaries; seats decreased from 43 to 32
2019	15	2	3	4	8	No overall control
2023	7	1	5	10	9	No overall control

== Results maps ==
1979 results map

1983 results map

1987 results map

1991 results map

1995 results map

1999 results map

2003 results map

2007 results map

2011 results map

2015 results map

2019 results map

2023 results map

== By-election results ==
A by-election occurs when seats become vacant between council elections. Below is a summary of by-elections from 1983 onwards. Full by-election results are listed under the last regular election preceding the by-election and can be found by clicking on the ward name.

=== 1983-1994 ===
Ward	Date	Incumbent party	Winning party
Lavenham	1 September 1983	Alliance	Conservative
Shotley	13 September 1984	Independent	Alliance
Great Cornard North	28 February 1985	Labour	Labour
Hadleigh	23 October 1986	Independent	Alliance
Brantham	27 November 1986	Independent	Alliance
Polstead & Layham	21 July 1988	Conservative	Independent
Sudbury South	10 November 1988	Conservative	Labour
Lavenham	17 November 1988	Conservative	Conservative
Hadleigh	7 December 1989	Independent	SLD
Bildeston	13 June 1991	Independent	Independent
Dodnash	20 August 1992	Independent	Conservative

=== 1995-2006 ===
Ward	Date	Incumbent party	Winning party
Shotley	8 August 1996	Independent	Liberal Democrats
Alton	28 May 1998	Independent	Liberal Democrats
Great Cornard North	4 May 2000	Labour	Labour

=== 2007-2018 ===
Ward	Date	Incumbent party	Winning party
Hadleigh North	8 November 2007	Liberal Democrats	Liberal Democrats
Great Cornard North	22 July 2010	Conservative	Labour
Bures St. Mary	2 May 2013	Conservative	Liberal Democrats
South Cosford	22 May 2014	Conservative	Green
sudbury South	7 September 2017	Conservative	Labour

=== 2019-present ===
Ward	Date	Incumbent party	Winning party
Great Cornard	6 May 2021	Conservative	Conservative
Copdock & Washbrook	16 October 2025	Liberal Democrats	Reform UK

== See also ==
- Politics of England
