= 2011 Babergh District Council election =

2011 English local government election

- 5 May 2011

All 42 seats to Babergh District Council 22 seats needed for a majority

	First party	Second party
Party	Conservative	Liberal Democrats
Seats won	18	12
Seat change	▼1	▼4
Popular vote	17,691	10,787
Percentage	38.6%	23.6%
Swing	▲2.0%	▼17.8%
	Third party	Fourth party
Party	Independent	Labour
Seats won	10	3
Seat change	▲2	▲3
Popular vote	7,046	7,776
Percentage	15.4%	17.0%
Swing	▲3.7%	▲10.6%
- Winner of each seat at the 2011 Babergh District Council election.
Control before election
No overall control
Control after election
No overall control

The 2011 Babergh District Council election took place on 5 May 2011 to elect members of Babergh District Council in Suffolk, England. This was on the same day as other local elections.

== Summary ==
=== Background ===
The previous election in 2007 saw no party win a majority, with the Conservatives being the largest party. Labour won no seats at the election, but recovered one seat when Tony Bavington gained a seat back in a 2010 by-election in Great Cornard. A further change in composition came in March 2010 when councillor Dean Walton defected to the Green Party from the Conservatives, but sat as an independent on Babergh Council.

A total of 122 candidates were nominated for the 43 seats being contested, which was reported to be a record for an election to Babergh Council, and up from 78 at the 2003 election and 87 in 2007. These were comprised on 34 Conservatives, 31 Labour, 27 Liberal Democrats, 14 United Kingdom Independence Party, 1 Green Party and 15 candidates from no party. The 31 candidates from Labour was a record for the party in Babergh, while the Liberal Democrat leader on Suffolk County Council, Kathy Pollard, was among the Liberal Democrat candidates.

=== Election result ===
The results saw the council remain under no overall control, with the Conservatives staying as the largest party on 18 seats. The Liberal Democrats dropped to 12 seats, while Labour increased from the 1 seat they had held after a by-election gain to 3 seats.

Individual results included an independent gain from the Conservatives in Lavenham, Liberal Democrat Kathy Pollard winning a place back on the council after 16 years, while author and Labour candidate Nicci Gerrard lost in South Cosford, coming third with 187 votes.

2011 Babergh District Council election
Party	Candidates	Seats	Gains	Losses	Net gain/loss	Seats %	Votes %	Votes	+/−
Conservative	34	18	4	5	▼1	41.9	38.6	17,691	+2.0
Liberal Democrats	27	12	1	5	▼4	27.9	23.6	10,787	–17.8
Independent	14	10	2	0	▲2	23.3	15.4	7,046	+3.7
Labour	31	3	3	0	▲3	7.0	17.0	7,776	+10.6
UKIP	14	0	0	0	Steady	0.0	4.5	2,048	+0.5
Green	1	0	0	0	Steady	0.0	0.9	428	N/A

2 Liberal Democrats and 1 Independent were elected unopposed.

== Ward results ==
Incumbent councillors standing for re-election are marked with an asterisk (*). Changes in seats do not take into account by-elections or defections.

=== Alton ===
Alton (2 seats)
Party	Candidate	Votes	%	±%
Liberal Democrats	Anthony Ward*	902	55.1	
Liberal Democrats	David Wood*	823	50.3	
Conservative	Christopher Chambers	503	30.7	
Conservative	Patricia Cave	396	24.1	
Labour	Keith Rawlings	231	14.1	
Labour	Carol Tilbury	219	13.4	
Turnout		~1,687	52.8	
Registered electors		3,195		
Liberal Democrats hold				
Liberal Democrats hold				

=== Berners ===
Berners (2 seats)
Party	Candidate	Votes	%	±%
Liberal Democrats	Charles Roberts*	Unopposed		
Liberal Democrats	Mackenzie Deacon	Unopposed		
Registered electors		3,149		
Liberal Democrats hold				
Liberal Democrats hold				

=== Boxford ===
Boxford
Party	Candidate	Votes	%	±%
Liberal Democrats	Bryn Hurren*	695	65.6	
Conservative	Tasia Kavvadias	365	34.4	
Majority		330	31.1	
Turnout		1,060	60.7	
Registered electors		1,769		
Liberal Democrats hold		Swing		

=== Brett Vale ===
Brett Vale
Party	Candidate	Votes	%	±%
Conservative	Desmond Keane*	434	50.3	
Green	Robert Lindsay	428	49.7	
Majority		6	0.7	
Turnout		862	53.7	
Registered electors		1,658		
Conservative hold		Swing		

=== Brook ===
Brook (2 seats)
Party	Candidate	Votes	%	±%
Conservative	Nicholas Ridley*	721	33.6	
Independent	Peter Jones*	598	27.9	
Liberal Democrats	Gloria Wallace	562	26.2	
Conservative	Barry Gasper	555	25.9	
Labour	Emma Cookson	264	12.3	
Turnout		~1,599	49.2	
Registered electors		3,250		
Conservative hold				
Independent hold				

=== Bures St. Mary ===
Bures St. Mary
Party	Candidate	Votes	%	±%
Conservative	Peter Holbrook*	585	82.0	
Labour	Iain Scott	128	18.0	
Majority		457	64.1	
Turnout		713	50.6	
Registered electors		1,421		
Conservative hold		Swing		

=== Chadacre ===
Chadacre
Party	Candidate	Votes	%	±%
Independent	James Long*	792	89.7	
Labour	John Finnigan	91	10.3	
Majority		701	79.4	
Turnout		883	54.9	
Registered electors		1,627		
Independent hold		Swing		

=== Dodnash ===
Dodnash (2 seats)
Party	Candidate	Votes	%	±%
Conservative	Alan Hinton*	792	41.6	
Liberal Democrats	Michael Bamford	495	26.0	
Liberal Democrats	Michael Miller*	451	23.7	
Independent	Clive Totman	354	18.6	
Labour	Joy Harrison	262	13.8	
Labour	Emma Nordon	174	9.1	
Turnout		~1,593	55.1	
Registered electors		2,889		
Conservative hold				
Liberal Democrats hold				

=== Glemsford & Stanstead ===
Glemsford & Stanstead (2 seats)
Party	Candidate	Votes	%	±%
Independent	Rex Thake*	694	53.6	
Independent	Leonard Young*	611	47.2	
Conservative	David Burch	397	30.7	
Labour	Heath Brown	203	15.7	
Labour	David Hayes	183	14.1	
Turnout		~1,234	41.6	
Registered electors		2,968		
Independent gain from Liberal Democrats				
Independent hold				

=== Great Cornard North ===
Great Cornard North (2 seats)
Party	Candidate	Votes	%	±%
Labour	Anthony Bavington	508	37.0	
Labour	Neil MacMaster	432	31.5	
Conservative	Nicholas Antill	387	28.2	
UKIP	Derek Allen	248	18.1	
Liberal Democrats	Marion Press	229	16.7	
UKIP	Cynthia Allen	207	15.1	
Turnout		~1,196	35.8	
Registered electors		3,341		
Labour gain from Conservative				
Labour gain from Conservative				

=== Great Cornard South ===
Great Cornard South (2 seats)
Party	Candidate	Votes	%	±%
Conservative	Peter Beer*	464	44.7	
Conservative	Mark Newman*	426	41.0	
Labour	To5 Bellaris	210	20.3	
Labour	Robert Porter	205	19.8	
Independent	Anthony Harman	205	19.8	
Independent	Thomas Keane	170	16.4	
Liberal Democrats	Richard Platt	158	15.2	
Liberal Democrats	Catherine Press	134	12.9	
Turnout		~1,060	31.7	
Registered electors		3,343		
Conservative hold				
Conservative hold				

=== Hadleigh North ===
Hadleigh North (2 seats)
Party	Candidate	Votes	%	±%
Conservative	Brian Riley*	595	39.5	
Liberal Democrats	Mary Munson*	448	29.8	
Liberal Democrats	Richard Whiting	367	24.4	
Labour	Angela Wiltshire	247	16.4	
Labour	David Westwood	233	15.5	
UKIP	Reginald Smith	215	14.3	
Turnout		~1,327	39.0	
Registered electors		3,402		
Conservative hold				
Liberal Democrats hold				

=== Hadleigh South ===
Hadleigh South (2 seats)
Party	Candidate	Votes	%	±%
Liberal Democrats	David Grutchfield*	659	40.6	
Conservative	Kathryn Grandon-White	508	31.3	
Liberal Democrats	Peter Matthews	380	23.4	
Labour	Susan Monks	204	12.6	
Independent	David Cooper	186	11.5	
Labour	Stephen Cockerton	158	9.7	
UKIP	John Smith	66	4.1	
UKIP	Josephine Smith	57	3.5	
Turnout		~1,332	44.4	
Registered electors		3,000		
Liberal Democrats hold				
Conservative gain from Liberal Democrats				

=== Holbrook ===
Holbrook
Party	Candidate	Votes	%	±%
Independent	David Rose*	Unopposed		
Registered electors		1,677		
Independent hold				

=== Lavenham ===
Lavenham
Party	Candidate	Votes	%	±%
Independent	Andrea Norman	411	50.3	
Conservative	Philip Gibson*	337	41.2	
Labour	James Coleman	69	8.4	
Majority		74	9.1	
Turnout		817	55.0	
Registered electors		1,492		
Independent gain from Conservative		Swing		

=== Leavenheath ===
Leavenheath
Party	Candidate	Votes	%	±%
Conservative	Jennifer Jenkins*	648	77.7	
Labour	Andrew Jameson	186	22.3	
Majority		462	55.4	
Turnout		834	58.2	
Registered electors		1,460		
Conservative hold		Swing		

=== Long Melford ===
Long Melford (2 seats)
Party	Candidate	Votes	%	±%
Independent	Richard Kemp*	1,089	63.5	
Independent	John Nunn	743	43.3	
Conservative	William Shropshire	474	27.6	
Conservative	Margaret Maybury	419	24.4	
Labour	Susan Bishop	153	8.9	
Turnout		~1,585	50.1	
Registered electors		3,161		
Independent hold				
Independent hold				

=== Lower Brett ===
Lower Brett
Party	Candidate	Votes	%	±%
Independent	Susan Wigglesworth*	592	60.3	
Conservative	John Ward	390	39.7	
Majority		202	20.6	
Turnout		982	55.2	
Registered electors		1,751		
Independent hold		Swing		

=== Mid Samford ===
Mid Samford (2 seats)
Party	Candidate	Votes	%	±%
Liberal Democrats	Susan Carpendale*	819	42.5	
Liberal Democrats	Anne Pollard	808	41.9	
Conservative	Gerald White*	766	39.8	
Conservative	Theresa Bloomfield	671	34.9	
Labour	Susan Thomas	228	11.8	
UKIP	Richard Hudson-Smith	112	5.8	
UKIP	Christopher Streatfield	108	5.6	
Turnout		~1,884	58.5	
Registered electors		3,222		
Liberal Democrats hold				
Liberal Democrats gain from Conservative				

=== Nayland ===
Nayland
Party	Candidate	Votes	%	±%
Conservative	John Cave*	498	57.3	
Labour	William Kennedy	160	18.4	
UKIP	James Carver	123	14.2	
Liberal Democrats	Michael Breeze	88	10.1	
Majority		338	38.9	
Turnout		869	58.9	
Registered electors		1,487		
Conservative hold		Swing		

=== North Cosford ===
North Cosford
Party	Candidate	Votes	%	±%
Independent	Clive Arthey*	601	59.2	
Conservative	Brian Tora	288	28.3	
Labour	Gerald Gould	127	12.5	
Majority		313	30.8	
Turnout		1,016	55.6	
Registered electors		1,837		
Independent hold		Swing		

=== Pinewood ===
Pinewood (2 seats)
Party	Candidate	Votes	%	±%
Conservative	Peter Burgoyne	423	34.1	
Liberal Democrats	David Busby*	418	33.7	
Labour	David Plowman	400	32.2	
Liberal Democrats	Leonard Johnson*	336	27.1	
Conservative	Susan Powell	327	26.4	
Turnout		~1,161	34.8	
Registered electors		3,336		
Conservative gain from Liberal Democrats				
Liberal Democrats hold				

=== South Cosford ===
South Cosford
Party	Candidate	Votes	%	±%
Conservative	Dawn Kendall	492	48.8	
Liberal Democrats	Brian Lazenby*	330	32.7	
Labour	Nicola Gerrard	187	18.5	
Majority		162	16.1	
Turnout		1,009	56.7	
Registered electors		1,789		
Conservative gain from Liberal Democrats		Swing		

=== Sudbury East ===
Sudbury East (2 seats)
Party	Candidate	Votes	%	±%
Conservative	Adrian Osborne*	500	39.4	
Labour	Jack Owen	479	37.7	
Conservative	Janice Osborne	476	37.4	
Labour	Russell Smith	392	30.8	
Liberal Democrats	Emma Hewett	153	12.1	
UKIP	Susan Smith	137	10.8	
UKIP	Donald Martin	133	10.5	
Liberal Democrats	Oliver Forder	99	7.8	
Turnout		~1,263	37.3	
Registered electors		3,386		
Conservative hold				
Labour gain from Conservative				

=== Sudbury North ===
Sudbury North (2 seats)
Party	Candidate	Votes	%	±%
Conservative	John Sayers*	690	50.3	
Conservative	Raymond Smith*	537	39.1	
Labour	Joanne Connah	405	29.5	
Labour	Ian Pointon	370	26.9	
Liberal Democrats	Andrew Welsh	277	20.2	
Turnout		~1,297	37.7	
Registered electors		3,439		
Conservative hold				
Conservative hold				

=== Sudbury South ===
Sudbury South (2 seats)
Party	Candidate	Votes	%	±%
Liberal Democrats	Nigel Bennett*	508	37.7	
Conservative	Simon Barrett	371	27.5	
Conservative	Peter Goodchild	364	27.0	
Liberal Democrats	Martyn Booth*	337	25.0	
Labour	Luke Cresswell	336	24.9	
Labour	Michael Cornish	332	24.6	
UKIP	Jane Martin	132	9.8	
UKIP	Christine Wardrop	107	7.9	
Turnout		~1,358	39.0	
Registered electors		3,481		
Liberal Democrats hold				
Conservative gain from Liberal Democrats				

=== Waldingfield ===
Waldingfield (2 seats)
Party	Candidate	Votes	%	±%
Conservative	Jennifer Antill*	1,068	66.5	
Conservative	Frank Lawrenson	824	51.3	
Liberal Democrats	Alan Scott	311	19.4	
UKIP	Robert Armstrong	228	14.2	
UKIP	Leon Stedman	175	10.9	
Turnout		~1,502	46.3	
Registered electors		3,245		
Conservative hold				
Conservative hold				

== By-elections ==
=== Bures St Mary's ===
Bures St Mary's by-elecetion: 2 May 2013
Party	Candidate	Votes	%	±%
Conservative	James Cartlidge	305	59.6	
Green	Laura Smith	136	26.6	
Labour	Hadley French Gerrard	71	13.9	
Majority		169	33.0	
Turnout		512	27.8	
Registered electors		6,633		
Conservative hold		Swing		

=== South Cosford ===
South Cosford by-election: 22 May 2014
Party	Candidate	Votes	%	±%
Green	Robert Lindsay	346	35.8	
Conservative	David Talbot Clarke	330	34.1	
UKIP	Stephen Laing	219	22.6	
Labour	Angela Wiltshire	72	7.4	
Majority		16	1.7	
Turnout		967	54.7	
Registered electors		1,768		
Green gain from Conservative		Swing		
