= Listed buildings in Alpheton =

Civil Parish in Suffolk, England

Alpheton is a village and civil parish in the Babergh District of Suffolk, England. It contains 16 listed buildings that are recorded in the National Heritage List for England. Of these one is grade I, one is grade II* and 14 are grade II.

This list is based on the information retrieved online from Historic England.

== Key ==
Grade	Criteria
I	Buildings that are of exceptional interest
II*	Particularly important buildings of more than special interest
II	Buildings that are of special interest

== Listing ==
Name	Grade	Location	Type	Completed (Note: The date given is the date used by Historic England as significant for the initial building or that of an important part in the structure's description.)	Date designated	Grid ref. (Note: The grid reference is based on the British national grid reference system, sometimes known as OSGB36, used by the Ordnance Survey.) Geo-coordinates	Notes	Entry number (Note: The "List Entry Number" is a unique number assigned to each listed building and scheduled monument by Historic England.)	Image	Wikidata
Alpheton Hall	II				9 February 1978	TL8733850505; 52°07′16″N 0°44′06″E		1285967	Upload Photo	Q26574615
Barn at Old Hall Farm	II				9 April 1990	TL8739150464; 52°07′15″N 0°44′09″E		1351945	Upload Photo	Q26635007
Church of St Peter and St Paul	I		church building		23 March 1961	TL8734650474; 52°07′15″N 0°44′06″E		1036728	Church of St Peter and St Paul More images	Q17541758
Clapstile Farmhouse	II				9 February 1978	TL8911850912; 52°07′27″N 0°45′40″E		1351713	Upload Photo	Q26634792
Elms Farmhouse	II				9 February 1978	TL8918851706; 52°07′53″N 0°45′46″E		1351712	Upload Photo	Q26634791
Old Rectory	II				9 February 1978	TL8871051182; 52°07′36″N 0°45′19″E		1036729	Upload Photo	Q26288409
Post Office and House Adjoining	II				9 February 1978	TL8865351406; 52°07′44″N 0°45′17″E		1193909	Upload Photo	Q26488550
Bridge Cottage	II	Bridge Street			9 February 1978	TL8780349142; 52°06′31″N 0°44′28″E		1036730	Upload Photo	Q26288411
Mill House	II*	Bridge Street			10 January 1953	TL8785949205; 52°06′33″N 0°44′31″E		1285943	Upload Photo	Q17534234
Wash Farmhouse	II	Bridge Street			9 February 1978	TL8762948904; 52°06′24″N 0°44′18″E		1036731	Upload Photo	Q26288412
Thatched Cottage	II	Church Lane, Tye Green			9 February 1978	TL8805050712; 52°07′22″N 0°44′44″E		1351714	Upload Photo	Q26634793
Tye Farmhouse	II	Church Lane			10 January 1953	TL8806150638; 52°07′19″N 0°44′44″E		1285947	Upload Photo	Q26574597
Woodhall	II	The Green			16 April 1971	TL8839450747; 52°07′23″N 0°45′02″E		1193951	Upload Photo	Q26488590
Tallage	II	The Tye			9 February 1978	TL8854150639; 52°07′19″N 0°45′09″E		1036732	Upload Photo	Q26288413
Smithy Cottage	II	Tye Green			16 April 1971	TL8835750750; 52°07′23″N 0°45′00″E		1351715	Upload Photo	Q26634794
Tye Green Cottage Wren Cottage	II	Tye Green			9 February 1978	TL8815850876; 52°07′27″N 0°44′50″E		1193973	Upload Photo	Q26488613

== See also ==
- Grade I listed buildings in Suffolk
- Grade II* listed buildings in Suffolk

== Sources ==
- Bettely, James; Pevsner, Nikolaus (2015) [1961], Suffolk: West, The Buildings of England, New Haven and London: Yale University Press, ISBN 978-0-300-19655-9
