= 1983 Babergh District Council election =

- 5 May 1983

All 42 seats to Babergh District Council 22 seats needed for a majority

	First party	Second party	Third party
Party	Conservative	Independent	Labour
Seats won	18	18	3
Seat change	▲1	▲1	▼2
Popular vote	9,664	8,891	8,994
Percentage	31.9%	29.4%	29.7%
Swing	▼10.7%	▲7.6%	▼2.8%
	Fourth party	Fifth party
Party	Alliance	Residents
Seats won	3	0
Seat change	▲1	▼1
Popular vote	2,710	did not stand
Percentage	9.0%	did not stand
Swing	▲5.9%	N/A
- Winner of each seat at the 1983 Babergh District Council election.
Council control before election
No overall control
Council control after election
No overall control

The 1983 Babergh District Council election took place on 5 May 1983 to elect members of Babergh District Council in Suffolk, England. This was on the same day as other local elections.

== Summary ==
=== Election result ===
1983 Babergh District Council election
Party	Candidates	Seats	Gains	Losses	Net gain/loss	Seats %	Votes %	Votes	+/−
Conservative	21	18	3	2	▲1	42.9	31.9	9,664	–10.7
Independent	25	18	2	1	▲1	42.9	29.4	8,891	+7.6
Labour	25	3	1	3	▼2	7.1	29.7	8,994	–2.8
Alliance	9	3	2	1	▲1	7.1	9.0	2,710	+5.9
Residents	0	0	0	1	▼1	0.0	N/A	N/A	N/A

== Ward results ==
Incumbent councillors standing for re-election are marked with an asterisk (*). Changes in seats do not take into account by-elections or defections.

=== Alton ===
Alton
Party	Candidate	Votes	%	±%
Independent	R. Cook*	Unopposed		
Registered electors		1,147		
Independent gain from Labour				

=== Berners ===
Berners
Party	Candidate	Votes	%	±%
Independent	E. Pollard*	Unopposed		
Registered electors		1,213		
Independent hold				

=== Bildeston ===
Bildeston
Party	Candidate	Votes	%	±%
Independent	O. Simpson*	Unopposed		
Registered electors		1,233		
Independent hold				

=== Boxford ===
Boxford
Party	Candidate	Votes	%	±%
Independent	M. Prescott	549	69.8	
Labour	M. Armstrong	238	30.2	
Majority		311	39.6	
Turnout		787	53.5	
Registered electors		1,471		
Independent hold		Swing		

=== Brantham ===
Brantham
Party	Candidate	Votes	%	±%
Independent	J. Truswell*	427	51.2	
Labour	A. Ward	407	48.8	
Majority		20	2.4	
Turnout		834	50.3	
Registered electors		1,658		
Independent hold		Swing		

=== Brett Vale ===
Brett Vale
Party	Candidate	Votes	%	±%
Conservative	E. Green*	364	59.9	
Independent	P. McQuhae	244	40.1	
Majority		120	19.8	
Turnout		608	52.3	
Registered electors		1,163		
Conservative hold		Swing		

=== Brookvale ===
Brookvale
Party	Candidate	Votes	%	±%
Independent	J. Baxter*	540	83.2	
Labour	V. Robson	109	16.8	
Majority		431	66.4	
Turnout		649	38.7	
Registered electors		1,677		
Independent hold		Swing		

=== Bures St. Mary ===
Bures St. Mary
Party	Candidate	Votes	%	±%
Conservative	H. Engleheart*	Unopposed		
Registered electors		1,312		
Conservative hold				

=== Capel & Wenham ===
Capel & Wenham (2 seats)
Party	Candidate	Votes	%	±%
Labour	R. Pearce*	541	50.5	
Conservative	C. Watson	530	49.5	
Labour	S. Thomas	438	40.9	
Turnout		~1,053	44.3	
Registered electors		2,416		
Labour hold				
Conservative hold				

=== Chadacre ===
Chadacre
Party	Candidate	Votes	%	±%
Independent	G. Ince*	Unopposed		
Registered electors		1,655		
Independent hold				

=== Copdock ===
Copdock
Party	Candidate	Votes	%	±%
Independent	P. Jones	536	62.9	
Labour	R. Maddox	316	37.1	
Majority		220	25.8	
Turnout		852	39.0	
Registered electors		2,187		
Independent hold		Swing		

=== Dodnash ===
Dodnash (2 seats)
Party	Candidate	Votes	%	±%
Independent	C. Wake-Walker*	890	48.6	
Independent	S. Cripps	608	33.2	
Alliance	J. Miller	605	33.0	
Labour	G. Reason	335	18.3	
Turnout		~1,346	66.0	
Registered electors		2,771		
Independent hold				
Independent hold				

=== Elmsett ===
Elmsett
Party	Candidate	Votes	%	±%
Independent	T. Bailey-Smith*	Unopposed		
Registered electors		1,319		
Independent hold				

=== Glemsford ===
Glemsford (2 seats)
Party	Candidate	Votes	%	±%
Conservative	A. Goodwin*	506	60.2	
Conservative	P. Kiddy*	489	58.2	
Labour	F. Housego	334	39.8	
Labour	P. Cain	260	31.0	
Turnout		~1,129	43.5	
Registered electors		1,931		
Conservative hold				
Conservative hold				

=== Great Cornard North ===
Great Cornard North (2 seats)
Party	Candidate	Votes	%	±%
Labour	V. Cocker	522	51.0	
Labour	R. Nandi	399	39.0	
Conservative	S. Berry	283	27.7	
Conservative	J. Ambrose	247	24.1	
Independent	R. Lewis	218	21.3	
Independent	D. Davis	203	19.8	
Turnout		~1,276	42.6	
Registered electors		2,401		
Labour gain from Conservative				
Labour hold				

=== Great Cornard South ===
Great Cornard South (2 seats)
Party	Candidate	Votes	%	±%
Conservative	P. Beer*	746	45.2	
Conservative	A. Eady*	735	44.6	
Labour	N. MacMaster	553	33.5	
Labour	A. Bavington	486	29.4	
Alliance	W. Street	214	13.0	
Alliance	A. Blake	181	11.0	
Independent	P. Chandler	137	8.3	
Independent	A. Henderson	134	8.1	
Turnout		~1,665	50.1	
Registered electors		3,296		
Conservative hold				
Conservative hold				

=== Hadleigh ===
Hadleigh (3 seats)
Party	Candidate	Votes	%	±%
Independent	C. Claireaux*	1,436	76.2	
Independent	S. Hogg*	965	51.3	
Independent	J. Andrews*	788	41.9	
Labour	M. Nelson	448	23.8	
Labour	C. Farr	411	21.9	
Independent	P. Branch	338	18.0	
Turnout		~1,981	42.0	
Registered electors		4,489		
Independent hold				
Independent hold				
Independent hold				

=== Holbrook ===
Holbrook
Party	Candidate	Votes	%	±%
Independent	J. Godley*	Unopposed		
Registered electors		1,471		
Independent hold				

=== Lavenham ===
Lavenham
Party	Candidate	Votes	%	±%
Alliance	L. Spraggins*	432	57.5	
Conservative	A. Skeels	319	42.5	
Majority		113	15.0	
Turnout		751	53.8	
Registered electors		1,395		
Alliance hold		Swing		

=== Leavenheath ===
Leavenheath
Party	Candidate	Votes	%	±%
Independent	A. Boram*	Unopposed		
Registered electors		1,395		
Independent hold				

=== Long Melford ===
Long Melford (2 seats)
Party	Candidate	Votes	%	±%
Alliance	R. Kemp*	Unopposed		
Conservative	K. Overman	Unopposed		
Registered electors		2,733		
Alliance gain from Labour				
Conservative gain from Residents				

=== Nayland ===
Nayland
Party	Candidate	Votes	%	±%
Independent	D. Mitchell	324	65.9	
Independent	B. Lees	168	34.1	
Majority		156	31.8	
Turnout		492	52.1	
Registered electors		944		
Independent gain from Conservative		Swing		

=== North Cosford ===
North Cosford
Party	Candidate	Votes	%	±%
Independent	D. Hodge*	386	62.9	
Alliance	D. Knight	228	37.1	
Majority		158	25.8	
Turnout		614	51.3	
Registered electors		1,198		
Independent hold		Swing		

=== Polstead & Layham ===
Polstead & Layham
Party	Candidate	Votes	%	±%
Conservative	A. Lloyd*	Unopposed		
Registered electors		1,019		
Conservative hold				

=== Shotley ===
Shotley
Party	Candidate	Votes	%	±%
Conservative	T. Lloyd*	341	57.6	
Labour	S. Bryson	251	42.4	
Majority		90	15.2	
Turnout		592	45.2	
Registered electors		1,309		
Conservative hold		Swing		

=== Sudbury East ===
Sudbury East (2 seats)
Party	Candidate	Votes	%	±%
Alliance	S. Gargiulo*	539	35.4	
Conservative	J. Colman	524	34.4	
Labour	P. Du Pave	459	30.2	
Labour	T. Richmond	433	28.5	
Alliance	H. Ebdon	318	20.9	
Turnout		~1,489	54.3	
Registered electors		2,803		
Alliance gain from Labour				
Conservative hold				

=== Sudbury North ===
Sudbury North (2 seats)
Party	Candidate	Votes	%	±%
Conservative	R. Playford*	722	64.4	
Conservative	H. Singh*	657	58.6	
Labour	G. Warren	399	35.6	
Labour	J. Hornby	395	35.2	
Turnout		~1,173	39.7	
Registered electors		2,825		
Conservative hold				
Conservative hold				

=== Sudbury South ===
Sudbury South (2 seats)
Party	Candidate	Votes	%	±%
Conservative	A. Moore*	577	52.6	
Conservative	S. Letten	527	48.1	
Labour	E. Wiles	326	29.7	
Alliance	E. Lovelock	193	17.6	
Labour	A. Ascott	182	16.6	
Turnout		~1,100	52.9	
Registered electors		2,070		
Conservative hold				
Conservative gain from Alliance				

=== Waldingfield ===
Waldingfield (2 seats)
Party	Candidate	Votes	%	±%
Conservative	C. Spence*	807	71.1	
Conservative	V. Pryke	793	69.8	
Labour	H. Morse	328	28.9	
Labour	J. Skinner	326	28.7	
Turnout		~1,135	40.2	
Registered electors		2,822		
Conservative hold				
Conservative gain from Independent				

=== West Samford ===
West Samford
Party	Candidate	Votes	%	±%
Conservative	N. Quelch	497	83.5	
Labour	D. Tolcher	98	16.5	
Majority		399	67.0	
Turnout		595	47.4	
Registered electors		1,255		
Conservative hold		Swing		

== By-elections ==
=== Lavenham ===
Lavenham by-election: 1 September 1983
Party	Candidate	Votes	%	±%
Conservative		324	46.0	
Labour		223	31.6	
Alliance		158	22.4	
Majority		101	14.4	
Turnout		705	34.7	
Registered electors		2,032		
Conservative gain from Alliance		Swing		

=== Shotley ===
Shotley by-election: 13 September 1984
Party	Candidate	Votes	%	±%
Alliance		394	64.6	
Labour		144	23.6	
Independent		72	11.8	
Majority		250	41.0	
Turnout		610	50.0	
Registered electors		1,220		
Alliance gain from Independent		Swing		

=== Great Cornard North ===
Great Cornard North by-election: 28 February 1985
Party	Candidate	Votes	%	±%
Labour		419	56.9	
Alliance		166	22.5	
Conservative		152	20.6	
Majority		253	34.3	
Turnout		737	30.0	
Registered electors		2,457		
Labour hold		Swing		

=== Hadleigh ===
Hadleigh by-election: 23 October 1986
Party	Candidate	Votes	%	±%
Alliance		644	50.0	
Labour		385	29.9	
Independent		259	20.1	
Majority		259	20.1	
Turnout		1,288	27.0	
Registered electors		4,770		
Alliance gain from Independent		Swing		

=== Brantham ===
Brantham by-election: 27 November 1986
Party	Candidate	Votes	%	±%
Alliance		437	68.8	
Labour		198	31.2	
Majority		239	37.6	
Turnout		635	32.0	
Registered electors		1,984		
Alliance gain from Independent		Swing		
