= 2015 Babergh District Council election =

2015 UK local government election

- 7 May 2015

All 42 seats to Babergh District Council 22 seats needed for a majority

	First party	Second party
Party	Conservative	Independent
Seats won	31	8
Seat change	▲13	▼2
Popular vote	29,923	9,330
Percentage	40.2%	12.5%
Swing	▲1.6%	▼2.9%
	Third party	Fourth party
Party	Liberal Democrats	Labour
Seats won	3	1
Seat change	▼9	▼2
Popular vote	8,980	13,108
Percentage	12.1%	17.6%
Swing	▼11.5%	▲0.6%
- Winner of each seat at the 2015 Babergh District Council election.
Control before election
No overall control
Control after election
Conservative

The 2015 Babergh District Council election took place on 7 May 2015 to elect members of Babergh District Council in Suffolk, England. This was on the same day as the 2015 general election and other local elections.

== Summary ==
=== Election result ===
The results saw the Conservatives gain 14 seats and take 31 of the 43 seats to get an overall majority on the council. This was the first time since the formation of the council that any party had a majority of the seats. As was the case nationally, the Liberal Democrats suffered heavy losses. Meanwhile, Labour lost two of its three seats and held onto its last seat in Great Cornard North by 1 vote. The Green Party lost South Cosford to the Conservatives, a seat they had gained in a 2014 by-election, and subsequently lost all representation on the Council.

2015 Babergh District Council election
Party	Candidates	Seats	Gains	Losses	Net gain/loss	Seats %	Votes %	Votes	+/−
Conservative	35	31	13	0	▲13	72.1	40.2	29,923	+1.6
Independent	13	8	2	4	▼2	18.6	12.5	9,330	–2.9
Liberal Democrats	18	3	0	9	▼9	7.0	12.1	8,980	–11.5
Labour	37	1	0	2	▼2	2.3	17.6	13,108	+0.6
Green	43	0	0	0	Steady	0.0	12.7	9,458	+11.8
UKIP	10	0	0	0	Steady	0.0	4.9	3,622	+0.4

== Ward results ==
Incumbent councillors standing for re-election are marked with an asterisk (*). Changes in seats do not take into account by-elections or defections.

=== Alton ===
Alton (2 seats)
Party	Candidate	Votes	%	±%
Independent	Alastair McCraw	1,025	42.4	
Conservative	Harriet Steer	767	31.7	
Liberal Democrats	David Wood	664	27.4	
Labour	Phil Dunnett	428	17.7	
UKIP	Patrick O'Sullivan	423	17.5	
Liberal Democrats	Tony Roberts	251	10.4	
Labour	Liz Perryman	215	8.9	
Green	Lyndon Ship	140	5.8	
Green	Giles Ship	97	4.0	
Turnout		2,420	75.4	
Independent gain from Liberal Democrats				
Conservative gain from Liberal Democrats				

=== Berners ===
Berners (2 seats)
Party	Candidate	Votes	%	±%
Conservative	Peter Patrick	847	37.6	
Independent	Derek Davis	778	34.5	
Liberal Democrats	Tony Ingram	492	21.8	
Liberal Democrats	Malcolm Harding	475	21.1	
Green	Jane Gould	468	20.8	
Green	Andrew Sterling	337	14.9	
Labour	Graham Manuel	253	11.2	
Labour	Anne Manuel	170	7.5	
Turnout		2,255	71.5	
Conservative gain from Liberal Democrats				
Independent gain from Liberal Democrats				

=== Boxford ===
Boxford
Party	Candidate	Votes	%	±%
Liberal Democrats	Bryn Hurren	654	45.3	
Conservative	David Talbot Clarke	583	40.3	
Labour	Andrew Hathaway	127	8.8	
Green	Felix Reeves Whymark	81	5.6	
Majority		71	5.0	
Turnout		1,445	80.6	
Liberal Democrats hold		Swing		

=== Brett Vale ===
Brett Vale
Party	Candidate	Votes	%	±%
Conservative	Michael Creffield	693	56.4	
Green	Colin Widdup	400	32.6	
Labour	David Hayes	135	11.0	
Majority		293	23.8	
Turnout		1,228	72.7	
Conservative hold		Swing		

=== Brook ===
Brook (2 seats)
Party	Candidate	Votes	%	±%
Conservative	Nick Ridley	1,117	46.4	
Conservative	Barry Gasper	1,034	43.0	
Independent	John Whyman	775	32.2	
Labour	Keith Wade	410	17.0	
Green	Nikki O'Hagan	372	15.5	
Green	Caroline Daldry	197	8.2	
Turnout		2,405	72.4	
Conservative hold				
Conservative gain from Independent				

=== Bures St Mary ===
Bures St Mary
Party	Candidate	Votes	%	±%
Conservative	Lee Parker	760	69.2	
Green	Laura Smith	174	15.8	
Labour	Liz Dunnett	165	15.0	
Majority		586	53.4	
Turnout		1,099	74.1	
Conservative hold		Swing		

=== Chadacre ===
Chadacre
Party	Candidate	Votes	%	±%
Independent	James Long	917	72.1	
Green	Joseph Manning	207	16.3	
Labour	Elvina Williams	147	11.6	
Majority		710	55.8	
Turnout		1,271	75.6	
Independent hold		Swing		

=== Dodnash ===
Dodnash (2 seats)
Party	Candidate	Votes	%	±%
Conservative	John Hinton	1,021	46.0	
Conservative	Stephen Williams	784	35.3	
Liberal Democrats	Michael Bamford	677	30.5	
UKIP	Steven Whalley	308	13.9	
Green	Miriam Burns	301	13.6	
Labour	Iain Scott	301	13.6	
UKIP	Cavan O'Connell	273	12.3	
Green	Sallie Davies	200	9.0	
Turnout		2,219	76.1	
Conservative hold				
Conservative gain from Liberal Democrats				

=== Glemsford & Stanstead ===
Glemsford & Stanstead (2 seats)
Party	Candidate	Votes	%	±%
Conservative	Michael Holt	1,033	49.0	
Independent	Stephen Plumb	649	30.8	
Conservative	Liz Malvisi	562	26.7	
Independent	Anne Mallalieu	559	26.5	
Labour	Flavia Popescu-Richardson	307	14.6	
Green	Graham Manning	239	11.3	
Green	Richard Skeates	149	7.1	
Turnout		2,108	68.8	
Conservative gain from Independent				
Independent hold				

=== Great Cornard North ===
Great Cornard North (2 seats)
Party	Candidate	Votes	%	±%
Conservative	Tom Burrows	832	39.9	
Labour	Tony Bavington	700	33.6	
Conservative	David Stenson	699	33.5	
Labour	Becca Page-Wright	527	25.3	
Green	Isla Kaye	260	12.5	
Liberal Democrats	Colin Wright	258	12.4	
Green	Emily Adams	199	9.5	
Turnout		2,086	60.3	
Conservative gain from Labour				
Labour hold				

=== Great Cornard South ===
Great Cornard South (2 seats)
Party	Candidate	Votes	%	±%
Conservative	Peter Beer	1,095	48.6	
Conservative	Mark Newman	996	44.2	
Labour	Mick Cornish	577	25.6	
Labour	Tom Keane	534	23.7	
Liberal Democrats	Nigel Adam	265	11.8	
Green	Dean Walton	261	11.6	
Green	Heather Sainsbury	182	8.1	
Turnout		2,253	62.9	
Conservative hold				
Conservative hold				

=== Hadleigh North ===
Hadleigh North (2 seats)
Party	Candidate	Votes	%	±%
Conservative	Sian Dawson	927	39.6	
Conservative	Christina Campbell	818	34.9	
Labour	Angela Wiltshire	482	20.6	
UKIP	Reginald Smith	480	20.5	
Labour	Mark Sutcliffe	432	18.4	
Liberal Democrats	Trevor Sheldrick	401	17.1	
Independent	Peter Matthews	290	12.4	
Green	Peter Lynn	175	7.5	
Green	Lisa Gordon	169	7.2	
Turnout		2,343	64.2	
Conservative hold				
Conservative gain from Liberal Democrats				

=== Hadleigh South ===
Hadleigh South (2 seats)
Party	Candidate	Votes	%	±%
Conservative	Kathryn Grandon-White	884	43.5	
Conservative	Sue Burgoyne	834	41.0	
Labour	Sue Monks	462	22.7	
Liberal Democrats	Phil Neville	439	21.6	
Labour	Tony Boxford	364	17.9	
Green	Amy Aylett	252	12.4	
Green	Polly Huggett	145	7.1	
Turnout		2,034	68.0	
Conservative hold				
Conservative gain from Liberal Democrats				

=== Holbrook ===
Holbrook
Party	Candidate	Votes	%	±%
Independent	David Rose	795	67.0	
Green	Ralph Carpenter	229	19.3	
Labour	Carol Tilbury	162	13.7	
Majority		566	47.7	
Turnout		1,186	72.9	
Independent hold		Swing		

=== Lavenham ===
Lavenham
Party	Candidate	Votes	%	±%
Conservative	William Shropshire	515	48.0	
Independent	Jack Norman	353	32.9	
Labour	Emma Cookson	123	11.5	
Green	Ralph Crawshaw	82	7.6	
Majority		162	15.1	
Turnout		1,073	72.9	
Conservative gain from Independent		Swing		

=== Leavenheath ===
Leavenheath
Party	Candidate	Votes	%	±%
Conservative	Jennie Jenkins	841	72.0	
Labour	Andrew Jameson	160	13.7	
Green	Oliver Jerrold	148	12.7	
Majority		681	58.3	
Turnout		1,168	79.1	
Conservative hold		Swing		

=== Long Melford ===
Long Melford (2 seats)
Party	Candidate	Votes	%	±%
Independent	Richard Kemp	1,294	57.7	
Independent	John Nunn	833	37.1	
Conservative	Paul Moreton	733	32.7	
UKIP	Aidan Powlesland	301	13.4	
Labour	John Phillips	264	11.8	
Green	John Smith	157	7.0	
Green	Janet Smith	150	6.7	
Turnout		2,244	71.2	
Independent hold				
Independent hold				

=== Lower Brett ===
Lower Brett
Party	Candidate	Votes	%	±%
Conservative	John Ward	753	53.9	
UKIP	Stephen Laing	346	24.8	
Labour	Susan Hemmings	159	11.4	
Green	Jon Daldry	132	9.5	
Majority		407	29.2	
Turnout		1,396	77.4	
Conservative gain from Independent		Swing		

=== Mid Samford ===
Mid Samford (2 seats)
Party	Candidate	Votes	%	±%
Liberal Democrats	Sue Carpendale	1,196	46.3	
Conservative	Fenella Swan	1,145	44.3	
Liberal Democrats	Kathy Pollard	1,104	42.7	
Labour	Paul Cowell	300	11.6	
Green	Tanya Griffiths	212	8.2	
Green	James Molloy	130	5.0	
Turnout		2,584	78.3	
Liberal Democrats hold				
Conservative gain from Liberal Democrats				

=== Nayland ===
Nayland
Party	Candidate	Votes	%	±%
Conservative	Melanie Barrett	599	54.0	
Labour	Emma Bishton	224	20.2	
UKIP	James Carver	210	18.9	
Green	Hayley Brett	74	6.7	
Majority		375	33.8	
Turnout		1,109	73.4	
Conservative hold		Swing		

=== North Cosford ===
North Cosford
Party	Candidate	Votes	%	±%
Independent	Clive Arthey	854	61.3	
Green	Sandra Townsend	303	21.7	
Labour	Heath Brown	203	14.6	
Majority		551	39.6	
Turnout		1,394	74.8	
Independent hold		Swing		

=== Pinewood ===
Pinewood (2 seats)
Party	Candidate	Votes	%	±%
Conservative	Peter Burgoyne	1,049	49.2	
Liberal Democrats	David Busby	879	41.2	
Labour	David Plowman	613	28.7	
Labour	Sue Thomas	384	18.0	
Green	Lois Hickey	221	10.4	
Green	Christopher Pearson	101	4.7	
Turnout		2,133	63.3	
Conservative hold				
Liberal Democrats hold				

=== South Cosford ===
South Cosford
Party	Candidate	Votes	%	±%
Conservative	Alan Ferguson	684	48.4	
Green	Robert Lindsay	646	45.7	
Labour	Annabel Hathaway	72	5.1	
Majority		38	2.7	
Turnout		1,413	78.2	
Conservative hold		Swing		

=== Sudbury East ===
Sudbury East (2 seats)
Party	Candidate	Votes	%	±%
Conservative	Adrian Osborne	952	46.8	
Conservative	Jan Osborne	883	43.4	
Labour	Jack Owen	682	33.5	
Labour	Sarah Page	533	26.2	
Green	Julie Fowles-Smith	259	12.7	
Green	Arthur Tunley	203	10.0	
Liberal Democrats	Andrew Welsh	166	8.2	
Turnout		2,033	61.1	
Conservative hold				
Conservative gain from Labour				

=== Sudbury North ===
Sudbury North (2 seats)
Party	Candidate	Votes	%	±%
Conservative	Sue Ayres	989	45.0	
Conservative	Ray Smith	867	39.5	
Labour	Linda Gregory	558	25.4	
Labour	Sandra Stark	486	22.1	
Green	Steve May	331	15.1	
Green	Simon Edge	282	12.8	
Liberal Democrats	Oliver Forder	282	12.8	
Turnout		2,196	63.2	
Conservative hold				
Conservative hold				

=== Sudbury South ===
Sudbury South (2 seats)
Party	Candidate	Votes	%	±%
Conservative	Simon Barrett	756	35.9	
Conservative	David Holland	540	25.7	
Labour	Luke Cresswell	535	25.4	
Labour	Joanne Connah	478	22.7	
UKIP	Peter St John Howe	367	17.4	
Liberal Democrats	Robert Spivey	267	12.7	
Green	John Burch	263	12.5	
Liberal Democrats	Tony Platt	247	11.7	
Independent	Theodore Bird	208	9.9	
Green	Melanie Sainsbury	170	8.1	
Turnout		2,104	61.6	
Conservative hold				
Conservative gain from Liberal Democrats				

=== Waldingfield ===
Waldingfield (2 seats)
Party	Candidate	Votes	%	±%
Conservative	Frank Lawrenson	1,217	49.9	
Conservative	Margaret Maybury	1,114	45.7	
UKIP	Stuart Armstrong	545	22.4	
Labour	Alison Owen	436	17.9	
UKIP	Leon Stedman	369	15.1	
Liberal Democrats	Alan Scott	263	10.8	
Green	Daynore Cameron	234	9.6	
Green	Jonathan Schofield	126	5.2	
Turnout		2,439	71.3	
Conservative hold				
Conservative hold				

== By-elections ==
=== Sudbury South ===
Sudbury South By-Election 7 September 2017
Party	Candidate	Votes	%	±%
Labour	Luke Cresswell	336	42.7	+20.4
Conservative	Simon Sudbury	335	42.6	+11.0
Liberal Democrats	Andrew Welsh	116	14.7	+3.6
Majority		1	0.1	
Turnout		787	22.7	
Registered electors		3,467		
Labour gain from Conservative		Swing		
