= 1999 Babergh District Council election =

1999 English local government election

- 6 May 1999

All 42 seats to Babergh District Council 22 seats needed for a majority

	First party	Second party
Party	Independent	Liberal Democrats
Seats won	14	13
Seat change	▼1	▲6
Popular vote	6,894	9,199
Percentage	22.9%	30.5%
Swing	▼0.2%	▲9.5%
	Third party	Fourth party
Party	Conservative	Labour
Seats won	10	5
Seat change	▲2	▼7
Popular vote	9,024	5,021
Percentage	29.9%	16.7%
Swing	▲8.1%	▼17.4%
- Winner of each seat at the 1999 Babergh District Council election.
Control before election
No overall control
Control after election
No overall control

The 1999 Babergh District Council election took place on 6 May 1999 to elect members of Babergh District Council in Suffolk, England. This was on the same day as other local elections.

== Summary ==
=== Election result ===
1999 Babergh District Council election
Party	Candidates	Seats	Gains	Losses	Net gain/loss	Seats %	Votes %	Votes	+/−
Independent	22	14	4	5	▼1	26.3	22.9	6,894	–0.2
Liberal Democrats	21	13	6	0	▲6	34.2	30.5	9,199	+9.5
Conservative	28	10	4	2	▲2	26.3	29.9	9,024	+8.1
Labour	17	5	0	7	▼7	13.2	16.7	5,021	–17.4

== Ward results ==
Incumbent councillors standing for re-election are marked with an asterisk (*). Changes in seats do not take into account by-elections or defections.

=== Alton ===
Alton
Party	Candidate	Votes	%	±%
Liberal Democrats	David Wood*	399	71.8	
Conservative	Christopher Thomas	157	28.2	
Majority		242	43.6	
Turnout		556	53.0	
Registered electors		1,055		
Liberal Democrats gain from Independent		Swing		

=== Berners ===
Berners
Party	Candidate	Votes	%	±%
Liberal Democrats	Shirley Clarke	332	65.1	
Conservative	Linda Prismall	178	34.9	
Majority		154	30.2	
Turnout		510	43.4	
Registered electors		1,181		
Liberal Democrats gain from Conservative		Swing		

=== Bildeston ===
Bildeston
Party	Candidate	Votes	%	±%
Conservative	Peter Stevens	295	52.9	
Labour	Rosemary Muntus	147	26.3	
Independent	Ruth Gregory*	116	20.8	
Majority		148	26.6	
Turnout		558	41.3	
Registered electors		1,353		
Conservative gain from Independent		Swing		

=== Boxford ===
Boxford
Party	Candidate	Votes	%	±%
Liberal Democrats	Bryn Hurren	366	56.1	
Independent	Carol Harrison	286	43.9	
Majority		80	12.2	
Turnout		652	43.6	
Registered electors		1,502		
Liberal Democrats gain from Independent		Swing		

=== Brantham ===
Brantham
Party	Candidate	Votes	%	±%
Liberal Democrats	Duncan Read	388	59.5	
Conservative	Diana Eastman	264	40.5	
Majority		124	19.0	
Turnout		652	32.9	
Registered electors		1,982		
Liberal Democrats hold		Swing		

=== Brett Vale ===
Brett Vale
Party	Candidate	Votes	%	±%
Independent	Clive Arthey*	431	75.2	
Labour	Jocelyn Dalley	142	24.8	
Majority		289	50.4	
Turnout		573	47.6	
Registered electors		1,211		
Independent hold		Swing		

=== Brookvale ===
Brookvale
Party	Candidate	Votes	%	±%
Liberal Democrats	Ann Stephenson	259	39.9	
Conservative	Lesley Chalmers	209	32.2	
Independent	James Baxter*	181	27.9	
Majority		50	7.7	
Turnout		649	35.1	
Registered electors		1,863		
Liberal Democrats gain from Independent		Swing		

=== Bures St. Mary ===
Bures St. Mary
Party	Candidate	Votes	%	±%
Conservative	Peter Holbrook	382	71.5	
Labour	Geoffrey Hulme	152	28.5	
Majority		230	43.1	
Turnout		534	39.1	
Registered electors		1,375		
Conservative hold		Swing		

=== Capel & Wenham ===
Capel & Wenham (2 seats)
Party	Candidate	Votes	%	±%
Liberal Democrats	Susan Carpendale*	765	68.3	
Liberal Democrats	Leonard Johnson*	659	58.8	
Conservative	Colin Hucombe	458	40.9	
Turnout		~1,120	43.0	
Registered electors		2,604		
Liberal Democrats hold				
Liberal Democrats hold				

=== Chadacre ===
Chadacre
Party	Candidate	Votes	%	±%
Independent	James Long	457	71.0	
Independent	Graham Morgan	187	29.0	
Majority		270	41.9	
Turnout		644	34.9	
Registered electors		1,832		
Independent hold		Swing		

=== Copdock ===
Copdock
Party	Candidate	Votes	%	±%
Independent	Peter Jones*	Unopposed		
Registered electors		3,792		
Independent hold				

=== Dodnash ===
Dodnash (2 seats)
Party	Candidate	Votes	%	±%
Liberal Democrats	Jacqueline Heselden*	789	53.8	
Conservative	Duncan Mansfield	677	46.2	
Liberal Democrats	John Wheals	671	45.8	
Turnout		~1,333	46.3	
Registered electors		2,877		
Liberal Democrats hold				
Conservative hold				

=== Elmsett ===
Elmsett
Party	Candidate	Votes	%	±%
Liberal Democrats	Brian Lazenby*	337	60.3	
Independent	Tony Bailey-Smith	222	39.7	
Majority		115	20.6	
Turnout		559	40.1	
Registered electors		1,408		
Liberal Democrats hold		Swing		

=== Glemsford ===
Glemsford (2 seats)
Party	Candidate	Votes	%	±%
Independent	Rex Thake	447	47.6	
Independent	Leonard Young	314	33.5	
Liberal Democrats	Stephen Clarke	289	30.8	
Conservative	Paul Edmondson*	203	21.6	
Conservative	Ian Lawrence	168	17.9	
Turnout		~776	30.9	
Registered electors		2,513		
Independent hold				
Independent gain from Conservative				

=== Great Cornard North ===
Great Cornard North (2 seats)
Party	Candidate	Votes	%	±%
Labour	Anthony Bavington*	422	52.8	
Labour	Vera Cocker*	408	51.0	
Independent	Christina Baker	164	20.5	
Liberal Democrats	Michael Gleed	113	14.1	
Conservative	Brian Rayner	101	12.6	
Turnout		~656	23.0	
Registered electors		2,853		
Labour hold				
Labour hold				

=== Great Cornard South ===
Great Cornard South (2 seats)
Party	Candidate	Votes	%	±%
Labour	Rajiv Nandi*	444	51.0	
Labour	Patrick Treacy	376	43.2	
Conservative	Peter Beer	355	40.8	
Conservative	Mark Newman	319	36.6	
Liberal Democrats	Nigel Adam	143	16.4	
Turnout		~871	28.2	
Registered electors		3,087		
Labour hold				
Labour hold				

=== Hadleigh ===
Hadleigh (3 seats)
Party	Candidate	Votes	%	±%
Liberal Democrats	David Grutchfield*	1,117	56.7	
Independent	Eileen Banks	708	36.0	
Liberal Democrats	Peter Matthews*	682	34.6	
Independent	Janetta Byrne	514	26.1	
Conservative	Vivien Chapman	441	22.4	
Conservative	Christopher Drake	361	18.3	
Turnout		~1,969	35.1	
Registered electors		5,609		
Liberal Democrats hold				
Independent gain from Labour				
Liberal Democrats hold				

=== Holbrook ===
Holbrook
Party	Candidate	Votes	%	±%
Independent	Jack Godley*	Unopposed		
Registered electors		1,675		
Independent hold				

=== Lavenham ===
Lavenham
Party	Candidate	Votes	%	±%
Conservative	John Roberts	464	57.3	
Liberal Democrats	Fiona Jenkins	346	42.7	
Majority		118	14.6	
Turnout		810	53.3	
Registered electors		1,538		
Conservative hold		Swing		

=== Leavenheath ===
Leavenheath
Party	Candidate	Votes	%	±%
Independent	Jonquil Mieville*	Unopposed		
Registered electors		2,013		
Independent hold				

=== Long Melford ===
Long Melford (2 seats)
Party	Candidate	Votes	%	±%
Independent	Richard Kemp*	921	76.4	
Independent	John Brand	788	65.4	
Conservative	Ian Dowling	285	23.6	
Turnout		~1,170	37.5	
Registered electors		3,117		
Independent hold				
Independent hold				

=== Nayland ===
Nayland
Party	Candidate	Votes	%	±%
Conservative	John Cave*	302	59.2	
Labour	Nicolette Fraser	208	40.8	
Majority		94	18.4	
Turnout		510	52.2	
Registered electors		984		
Conservative hold		Swing		

=== North Cosford ===
North Cosford
Party	Candidate	Votes	%	±%
Independent	David Hodge*	342	50.7	
Labour	Roland Bee	332	49.3	
Majority		10	1.4	
Turnout		674	52.2	
Registered electors		1,301		
Independent hold		Swing		

=== Polstead & Layham ===
Polstead & Layham
Party	Candidate	Votes	%	±%
Independent	Susan Wigglesworth*	Unopposed		
Registered electors		1,138		
Independent hold				

=== Shotley ===
Shotley
Party	Candidate	Votes	%	±%
Liberal Democrats	Joy Sadler*	541	71.5	
Conservative	Stephen Williams	216	28.5	
Majority		325	42.9	
Turnout		757	41.0	
Registered electors		1,846		
Liberal Democrats gain from Independent		Swing		

=== Sudbury East ===
Sudbury East (2 seats)
Party	Candidate	Votes	%	±%
Conservative	Sylvia Byham	374	41.9	
Independent	Sylvia Cann*	365	40.9	
Conservative	Robert Yerby	256	28.7	
Labour	Rita Titmus	222	24.9	
Labour	Sylvia Regester	221	24.8	
Liberal Democrats	Andrew Welsh	100	11.2	
Turnout		~893	31.4	
Registered electors		2,845		
Conservative gain from Labour				
Independent gain from Labour				

=== Sudbury North ===
Sudbury North (2 seats)
Party	Candidate	Votes	%	±%
Conservative	John Sayers	451	44.4	
Labour	Nicholas Irwin	419	41.3	
Conservative	Raymond Smith	358	35.3	
Labour	Valerie Waters*	299	29.5	
Liberal Democrats	Nigel Bennett	156	15.4	
Independent	Brian Cann	125	12.3	
Turnout		~1,015	29.0	
Registered electors		3,501		
Conservative gain from Labour				
Labour hold				

=== Sudbury South ===
Sudbury South (2 seats)
Party	Candidate	Votes	%	±%
Liberal Democrats	Martyn Booth	376	36.8	
Independent	Elizabeth Wiles*	326	31.9	
Conservative	John Stewart	311	30.4	
Labour	Jack Owen	287	28.1	
Labour	Timothy Richmond*	277	27.1	
Conservative	Doreen Braham	267	26.1	
Turnout		~1,022	32.6	
Registered electors		3,136		
Liberal Democrats gain from Labour				
Independent gain from Labour				

=== Waldingfield ===
Waldingfield (2 seats)
Party	Candidate	Votes	%	±%
Conservative	Colin Spence*	657	54.9	
Conservative	Leon Stedman	515	43.0	
Liberal Democrats	Elizabeth Bates	371	31.0	
Labour	Richard May	335	28.0	
Labour	John Skinner*	330	27.6	
Turnout		~1,198	38.8	
Registered electors		3,089		
Conservative hold				
Conservative gain from Labour				

=== West Samford ===
West Samford
Party	Candidate	Votes	%	±%
Conservative	Mary Bancroft*	Unopposed		
Registered electors		1,293		
Conservative hold				

== By-elections ==
=== Great Cornard North ===
Great Cornard North by-election: 4 May 2000
Party	Candidate	Votes	%	±%
Labour		309	56.4	
Independent		239	43.6	
Majority		70	12.8	
Turnout		548	19.5	
Registered electors		2,810		
Labour hold		Swing		
