= 1995 Babergh District Council election =

1995 English local government election

- 4 May 1995

All 42 seats to Babergh District Council 22 seats needed for a majority

	First party	Second party
Party	Independent	Labour
Seats won	14	12
Seat change	▼2	▲6
Popular vote	7,221	10,665
Percentage	23.1%	34.1%
Swing	▲9.2%	▲1.7%
	Third party	Fourth party
Party	Conservative	Liberal Democrats
Seats won	9	7
Seat change	▼6	▲2
Popular vote	6,833	6,586
Percentage	21.8%	21.0%
Swing	▼11.7%	▲2.1%
- Winner of each seat at the 1995 Babergh District Council election.
Council control before election
No overall control
Council control after election
No overall control

The 1995 Babergh District Council election took place on 4 May 1995 to elect members of Babergh District Council in Suffolk, England. This was on the same day as other local elections.

== Summary ==
=== Election result ===
1995 Babergh District Council election
Party	Candidates	Seats	Gains	Losses	Net gain/loss	Seats %	Votes %	Votes	+/−
Independent	22	14	1	3	▼2	33.3	23.1	7,221	+9.2
Labour	20	12	6	0	▲6	28.6	34.1	10,665	+1.7
Conservative	21	9	2	8	▼6	21.4	21.8	6,833	–11.7
Liberal Democrats	15	7	2	0	▲2	16.7	21.0	6,586	+2.1

== Ward results ==
Incumbent councillors standing for re-election are marked with an asterisk (*). Changes in seats do not take into account by-elections or defections.

=== Alton ===
Alton
Party	Candidate	Votes	%	±%
Independent	R. Cook*	Unopposed		
Registered electors		1,078		
Independent hold				

=== Berners ===
Berners
Party	Candidate	Votes	%	±%
Conservative	J. Holmes*	Unopposed		
Registered electors		1,155		
Conservative hold				

=== Bildeston ===
Bildeston
Party	Candidate	Votes	%	±%
Independent	R. Gregory*	235	37.0	
Liberal Democrats	M. Van Der Gucht	217	34.1	
Labour	V. Letton	184	28.9	
Majority		18	2.9	
Turnout		636	48.3	
Registered electors		1,318		
Independent hold		Swing		

=== Boxford ===
Boxford
Party	Candidate	Votes	%	±%
Independent	J. Lindsley*	Unopposed		
Registered electors		1,466		
Independent hold				

=== Brantham ===
Brantham
Party	Candidate	Votes	%	±%
Liberal Democrats	P. Revell*	621	76.1	
Conservative	A. Padgham	195	23.9	
Majority		426	52.2	
Turnout		816	46.9	
Registered electors		1,740		
Liberal Democrats hold		Swing		

=== Brett Vale ===
Brett Vale
Party	Candidate	Votes	%	±%
Conservative	C. Arthey*	356	51.4	
Liberal Democrats	B. Hurren	183	26.4	
Labour	E. Cocker	153	22.1	
Majority		173	25.0	
Turnout		692	58.9	
Registered electors		1,175		
Conservative hold		Swing		

=== Brookvale ===
Brookvale
Party	Candidate	Votes	%	±%
Independent	J. Baxter*	Unopposed		
Registered electors		1,907		
Independent hold				

=== Bures St. Mary ===
Bures St. Mary
Party	Candidate	Votes	%	±%
Conservative	H. Engleheart*	290	42.6	
Independent	G. Jackson	232	34.1	
Labour	T. Samuel	159	23.3	
Majority		58	8.5	
Turnout		681	51.6	
Registered electors		1,319		
Conservative hold		Swing		

=== Capel & Wenham ===
Capel & Wenham (2 seats)
Party	Candidate	Votes	%	±%
Liberal Democrats	S. Carpendale*	854	46.4	
Liberal Democrats	L. Johnson	650	35.3	
Conservative	W. Curnow	385	20.9	
Independent	W. Leay	169	9.2	
Turnout		~1,029	48.2	
Registered electors		2,479		
Liberal Democrats hold				
Liberal Democrats hold				

=== Chadacre ===
Chadacre
Party	Candidate	Votes	%	±%
Independent	G. Ince*	Unopposed		
Registered electors		1,809		
Independent hold				

=== Copdock ===
Copdock
Party	Candidate	Votes	%	±%
Independent	P. Jones*	669	58.2	
Labour	S. Soni	481	41.8	
Majority		188	16.3	
Turnout		1,150	33.3	
Registered electors		3,456		
Independent hold		Swing		

=== Dodnash ===
Dodnash (2 seats)
Party	Candidate	Votes	%	±%
Conservative	M. Nottingham*	Unopposed		
Liberal Democrats	J. Heselden*	Unopposed		
Registered electors		2,881		
Conservative gain from Independent				
Liberal Democrats hold				

=== Elmsett ===
Elmsett
Party	Candidate	Votes	%	±%
Liberal Democrats	B. Lazenby	393	58.0	
Independent	T. Bailey-Smith*	285	42.0	
Majority		108	15.9	
Turnout		678	50.6	
Registered electors		1,371		
Liberal Democrats gain from Conservative		Swing		

=== Glemsford ===
Glemsford (2 seats)
Party	Candidate	Votes	%	±%
Independent	J. Schaffer*	810	48.9	
Conservative	P. Edmondson	316	19.1	
Conservative	R. Irvine	269	16.2	
Turnout		~1,395	40.4	
Registered electors		2,463		
Independent gain from Conservative				
Conservative hold				

=== Great Cornard North ===
Great Cornard North (2 seats)
Party	Candidate	Votes	%	±%
Labour	A. Bavington*	764	42.8	
Labour	V. Cocker*	763	42.7	
Conservative	A. Eady	172	9.6	
Conservative	M. Newman	166	9.3	
Liberal Democrats	M. Earle	148	8.3	
Turnout		~1,069	37.8	
Registered electors		2,840		
Labour hold				
Labour hold				

=== Great Cornard South ===
Great Cornard South (2 seats)
Party	Candidate	Votes	%	±%
Labour	R. Nandi	652	36.7	
Labour	R. Mitchell	616	34.7	
Conservative	K. Beer*	454	25.6	
Conservative	C. Baker	436	24.6	
Liberal Democrats	M. Barran	173	9.7	
Turnout		~1,268	38.5	
Registered electors		3,113		
Labour gain from Conservative				
Labour gain from Conservative				

=== Hadleigh ===
Hadleigh (3 seats)
Party	Candidate	Votes	%	±%
Liberal Democrats	D. Grutchfield*	1,468	28.7	
Liberal Democrats	P. Matthews	860	16.8	
Labour	J. Quinlan	855	16.7	
Independent	J. Andrews*	830	16.2	
Conservative	E. Banks*	788	15.4	
Turnout		~2,301	43.3	
Registered electors		5,312		
Liberal Democrats hold				
Liberal Democrats gain from Conservative				
Labour gain from Independent				

=== Holbrook ===
Holbrook
Party	Candidate	Votes	%	±%
Independent	J. Godley*	Unopposed		
Registered electors		1,591		
Independent hold				

=== Lavenham ===
Lavenham
Party	Candidate	Votes	%	±%
Conservative	J. Hepworth*	418	56.8	
Labour	D. Hastie	318	43.2	
Majority		100	13.6	
Turnout		736	51.6	
Registered electors		1,427		
Conservative hold		Swing		

=== Leavenheath ===
Leavenheath
Party	Candidate	Votes	%	±%
Independent	J. Mieville	454	58.5	
Liberal Democrats	R. Hawes	322	41.5	
Majority		132	17.0	
Turnout		776	41.6	
Registered electors		1,866		
Independent hold		Swing		

=== Long Melford ===
Long Melford (2 seats)
Party	Candidate	Votes	%	±%
Independent	R. Kemp*	920	37.4	
Independent	R. Thake	639	26.0	
Independent	R. Michette*	386	15.7	
Labour	J. Walton	274	11.1	
Conservative	J. Colman	222	9.0	
Turnout		~1,915	48.0	
Registered electors		2,878		
Independent hold				
Independent hold				

=== Nayland ===
Nayland
Party	Candidate	Votes	%	±%
Conservative	J. Cave	275	55.2	
Labour	B. Kennedy	223	44.8	
Majority		52	10.4	
Turnout		498	52.0	
Registered electors		957		
Conservative gain from Independent		Swing		

=== North Cosford ===
North Cosford
Party	Candidate	Votes	%	±%
Independent	D. Hodge*	330	51.1	
Independent	B. Dyer	316	48.9	
Majority		14	2.2	
Turnout		646	52.9	
Registered electors		1,222		
Independent hold		Swing		

=== Polstead & Layham ===
Polstead & Layham
Party	Candidate	Votes	%	±%
Independent	S. Wigglesworth*	489	83.4	
Liberal Democrats	A. Stephenson	97	16.6	
Majority		392	66.9	
Turnout		586	54.0	
Registered electors		1,086		
Independent hold		Swing		

=== Shotley ===
Shotley
Party	Candidate	Votes	%	±%
Independent	J. Law*	Unopposed		
Registered electors		1,622		
Independent hold				

=== Sudbury East ===
Sudbury East (2 seats)
Party	Candidate	Votes	%	±%
Labour	S. Cann*	905	44.8	
Labour	R. Titmus*	702	34.7	
Conservative	A. Hewitt	291	14.4	
Liberal Democrats	A. Jervis	199	9.8	
Turnout		~2,097	45.8	
Registered electors		2,773		
Labour hold				
Labour hold				

=== Sudbury North ===
Sudbury North (2 seats)
Party	Candidate	Votes	%	±%
Labour	S. Gibbs*	631	36.4	
Labour	V. Waters	524	30.2	
Conservative	J. Sayers*	466	26.9	
Liberal Democrats	N. Bennett	401	23.1	
Turnout		~1,641	38.4	
Registered electors		3,141		
Labour hold				
Labour gain from Conservative				

=== Sudbury South ===
Sudbury South (2 seats)
Party	Candidate	Votes	%	±%
Labour	E. Wiles*	774	44.6	
Labour	T. Richmond	636	36.6	
Conservative	S. Byham*	445	25.6	
Turnout		~1,410	36.9	
Registered electors		3,137		
Labour hold				
Labour gain from Conservative				

=== Waldingfield ===
Waldingfield (2 seats)
Party	Candidate	Votes	%	±%
Labour	J. Skinner	616	33.4	
Conservative	C. Spence*	498	27.0	
Independent	V. Herbert	457	24.8	
Labour	F. Williams	435	23.6	
Conservative	D. Fletcher	371	20.1	
Turnout		~1,377	44.3	
Registered electors		3,002		
Labour gain from Conservative				
Conservative hold				

=== West Samford ===
West Samford
Party	Candidate	Votes	%	±%
Conservative	M. Bancroft*	Unopposed		
Registered electors		1,301		
Conservative hold				

== By-elections ==
=== Shotley ===
Shotley by-election: 8 August 1996
Party	Candidate	Votes	%	±%
Liberal Democrats		506	60.7	
Conservative		276	33.1	
Labour		51	6.1	
Majority		230	27.6	
Turnout		833	48.0	
Registered electors		1,735		
Liberal Democrats gain from Independent		Swing		

=== Alton ===
Alton by-election: 28 May 1998
Party	Candidate	Votes	%	±%
Liberal Democrats		327	63.4	
Conservative		189	36.6	
Majority		138	26.7	
Turnout		516	50.0	
Registered electors		1,032		
Liberal Democrats gain from Independent		Swing		
