= 1987 Babergh District Council election =

UK local election

- 7 May 1987

All 42 seats to Babergh District Council 22 seats needed for a majority

	First party	Second party
Party	Conservative	Independent
Seats won	18	18
Seat change	Steady	Steady
Popular vote	11,675	8,678
Percentage	33.1%	24.6%
Swing	▲1.2%	▼4.8%
	Third party	Fourth party
Party	Alliance	Labour
Seats won	4	2
Seat change	▲1	▼1
Popular vote	6,087	8,385
Percentage	17.2%	23.7%
Swing	▲8.2%	▼6.0%
- Winner of each seat at the 1987 Babergh District Council election.
Control before election
No overall control
Control after election
No overall control

The 1987 Babergh District Council election took place on 7 May 1987 to elect members of Babergh District Council in Suffolk, England. This was on the same day as other local elections.

== Summary ==
=== Election result ===
1987 Babergh District Council election
Party	Candidates	Seats	Gains	Losses	Net gain/loss	Seats %	Votes %	Votes	+/−
Conservative	24	18	2	2	Steady	42.9	33.1	11,675	+1.2
Independent	20	18	3	3	Steady	42.9	24.6	8,678	–4.8
Alliance	13	4	3	2	▲1	9.5	17.2	6,087	+8.2
Labour	25	2	0	1	▼1	4.8	23.7	8,385	–6.0
Green	2	0	0	0	Steady	0.0	1.4	499	N/A

== Ward results ==
Incumbent councillors standing for re-election are marked with an asterisk (*). Changes in seats do not take into account by-elections or defections.

=== Alton ===
Alton
Party	Candidate	Votes	%	±%
Independent	R. Cook*	Unopposed		
Registered electors		1,141		
Independent hold				

=== Berners ===
Berners
Party	Candidate	Votes	%	±%
Independent	E. Pollard*	Unopposed		
Registered electors		1,194		
Independent hold				

=== Bildeston ===
Bildeston
Party	Candidate	Votes	%	±%
Independent	G. Gregory	422	75.8	
Labour	J. Clandillon	135	24.2	
Majority		287	51.6	
Turnout		557	43.5	
Registered electors		1,280		
Independent hold		Swing		

=== Boxford ===
Boxford
Party	Candidate	Votes	%	±%
Independent	J. Lindsley	Unopposed		
Registered electors		1,458		
Independent hold				

=== Brantham ===
Brantham
Party	Candidate	Votes	%	±%
Independent	P. Revell	550	54.4	
Labour	W. Nixon	257	25.4	
Conservative	D. Arrow	204	20.2	
Majority		293	29.0	
Turnout		1,011	59.0	
Registered electors		1,714		
Independent hold		Swing		

=== Brett Vale ===
Brett Vale
Party	Candidate	Votes	%	±%
Independent	M. Gleed	255	39.0	
Independent	D. Randall	203	31.0	
Conservative	W. Howes-Bassett	196	30.0	
Majority		52	8.0	
Turnout		654	55.7	
Registered electors		1,174		
Independent gain from Conservative		Swing		

=== Brookvale ===
Brookvale
Party	Candidate	Votes	%	±%
Independent	J. Baxter*	426	60.4	
Alliance	P. Shearly-Sanders	279	39.6	
Majority		147	20.8	
Turnout		705	39.9	
Registered electors		1,767		
Independent hold		Swing		

=== Bures St. Mary ===
Bures St. Mary
Party	Candidate	Votes	%	±%
Conservative	H. Engleheart*	Unopposed		
Registered electors		1,319		
Conservative hold				

=== Capel & Wenham ===
Capel & Wenham (2 seats)
Party	Candidate	Votes	%	±%
Alliance	A. Pollard	634	37.1	
Conservative	C. Watson*	562	32.9	
Labour	R. Pearce*	512	30.0	
Alliance	S. Carpendale	499	29.2	
Labour	S. Thomas	324	19.0	
Turnout		~1,706	69.3	
Registered electors		2,463		
Alliance gain from Labour				
Conservative hold				

=== Chadacre ===
Chadacre
Party	Candidate	Votes	%	±%
Independent	G. Ince*	675	74.8	
Conservative	P. Drakard	228	25.2	
Majority		447	49.6	
Turnout		903	53.0	
Registered electors		1,705		
Independent hold		Swing		

=== Copdock ===
Copdock
Party	Candidate	Votes	%	±%
Independent	P. Jones*	745	77.4	
Labour	I. Grimwood	217	22.6	
Majority		528	54.8	
Turnout		962	35.5	
Registered electors		2,710		
Independent hold		Swing		

=== Dodnash ===
Dodnash (2 seats)
Party	Candidate	Votes	%	±%
Independent	S. Cripps*	840	42.5	
Alliance	M. Heselden	787	39.8	
Labour	D. Evans	349	17.7	
Turnout		~1,976	71.4	
Registered electors		2,767		
Independent hold				
Alliance gain from Independent				

=== Elmsett ===
Elmsett
Party	Candidate	Votes	%	±%
Conservative	T. Bailey-Smith*	Unopposed		
Registered electors		1,348		
Conservative gain from Independent				

=== Glemsford ===
Glemsford (2 seats)
Party	Candidate	Votes	%	±%
Conservative	J. Schaffer	570	49.2	
Conservative	P. Stevens	454	39.2	
Labour	P. Cain	333	28.7	
Green	M. Green	256	22.1	
Turnout		~1,157	52.3	
Registered electors		2,214		
Conservative hold				
Conservative hold				

=== Great Cornard North ===
Great Cornard North (2 seats)
Party	Candidate	Votes	%	±%
Labour	V. Cocker*	661	61.5	
Labour	A. Bavington	628	58.4	
Conservative	D. Simmons	413	38.5	
Conservative	G. Gilbert	390	36.4	
Turnout		~1,074	39.7	
Registered electors		2,706		
Labour hold				
Labour hold				

=== Great Cornard South ===
Great Cornard South (2 seats)
Party	Candidate	Votes	%	±%
Conservative	P. Beer*	877	48.1	
Conservative	A. Eady*	840	46.1	
Labour	M. Cornish	579	31.7	
Labour	S. Thorpe	500	27.4	
Alliance	K. Byford	368	20.2	
Turnout		~1,820	56.6	
Registered electors		3,222		
Conservative hold				
Conservative hold				

=== Hadleigh ===
Hadleigh (3 seats)
Party	Candidate	Votes	%	±%
Independent	C. Claireaux*	1,494	48.9	
Alliance	D. Grutchfield	948	31.0	
Independent	J. Andrews*	739	24.2	
Independent	J. Chisholm	415	13.6	
Labour	P. Cook	369	12.1	
Labour	M. Nelson	300	9.8	
Green	A. Gretton	243	8.0	
Labour	A. Seaborne	198	6.5	
Turnout		~3,056	63.5	
Registered electors		4,807		
Independent hold				
Alliance gain from Independent				
Independent hold				

=== Holbrook ===
Holbrook
Party	Candidate	Votes	%	±%
Independent	J. Godley*	Unopposed		
Registered electors		1,498		
Independent hold				

=== Lavenham ===
Lavenham
Party	Candidate	Votes	%	±%
Conservative	A. Skeels	550	77.8	
Labour	D. Hastie	157	22.2	
Majority		393	55.6	
Turnout		707	49.8	
Registered electors		1,420		
Conservative gain from Alliance		Swing		

=== Leavenheath ===
Leavenheath
Party	Candidate	Votes	%	±%
Independent	A. Boram*	Unopposed		
Registered electors		1,562		
Independent hold				

=== Long Melford ===
Long Melford (2 seats)
Party	Candidate	Votes	%	±%
Independent	R. Kemp*	1,090	48.1	
Conservative	K. Overman*	764	33.7	
Labour	R. Guyton	412	18.2	
Turnout		~2,266	84.6	
Registered electors		2,677		
Independent gain from Alliance				
Conservative hold				

=== Nayland ===
Nayland
Party	Candidate	Votes	%	±%
Independent	D. Mitchell*	325	53.9	
Alliance	R. Hawtin	278	46.1	
Majority		47	7.8	
Turnout		603	64.6	
Registered electors		934		
Independent hold		Swing		

=== North Cosford ===
North Cosford
Party	Candidate	Votes	%	±%
Independent	D. Hodge*	499	78.8	
Labour	G. Tyrer	134	21.2	
Majority		365	57.6	
Turnout		633	52.2	
Registered electors		1,213		
Independent hold		Swing		

=== Polstead & Layham ===
Polstead & Layham
Party	Candidate	Votes	%	±%
Conservative	A. Lloyd*	405	66.2	
Alliance	C. Edmunds	207	33.8	
Majority		198	32.4	
Turnout		612	57.0	
Registered electors		1,074		
Conservative hold		Swing		

=== Shotley ===
Shotley
Party	Candidate	Votes	%	±%
Independent	J. Law	Unopposed		
Registered electors		1,517		
Independent gain from Conservative				

=== Sudbury East ===
Sudbury East (2 seats)
Party	Candidate	Votes	%	±%
Alliance	S. Cann	716	45.8	
Conservative	J. Colman*	476	30.4	
Conservative	G. Casimir	436	27.9	
Labour	P. Du Pave	372	23.8	
Labour	T. Richmond	370	23.6	
Turnout		~1,288	55.6	
Registered electors		2,815		
Alliance hold				
Conservative hold				

=== Sudbury North ===
Sudbury North (2 seats)
Party	Candidate	Votes	%	±%
Conservative	R. Playford*	668	48.9	
Conservative	H. Singh*	637	46.7	
Alliance	T. Foy	416	30.5	
Labour	C. Lane	281	20.6	
Labour	S. Lepper	221	16.2	
Turnout		~1,223	45.6	
Registered electors		2,991		
Conservative hold				
Conservative hold				

=== Sudbury South ===
Sudbury South (2 seats)
Party	Candidate	Votes	%	±%
Conservative	S. Byham	532	43.0	
Conservative	R. Wood	446	36.0	
Alliance	B. Cann	353	28.6	
Labour	E. Wiles	351	28.4	
Labour	B. Niall	165	13.4	
Turnout		~1,236	48.8	
Registered electors		2,534		
Conservative hold				
Conservative hold				

=== Waldingfield ===
Waldingfield (2 seats)
Party	Candidate	Votes	%	±%
Conservative	V. Pryke*	810	52.8	
Conservative	C. Spence*	782	50.9	
Alliance	J. Say	417	27.2	
Labour	J. Skinner	307	20.0	
Labour	H. Morse	253	16.5	
Turnout		~1,535	53.1	
Registered electors		2,889		
Conservative hold				
Conservative hold				

=== West Samford ===
West Samford
Party	Candidate	Votes	%	±%
Conservative	N. Quelch*	435	70.2	
Alliance	E. Wheatley	185	29.8	
Majority		250	40.4	
Turnout		620	49.2	
Registered electors		1,259		
Conservative hold		Swing		

== By-elections ==
=== Polstead & Layham ===
Polstead & Layham by-election: 21 July 1988
Party	Candidate	Votes	%	±%
Independent		384	70.2	
Conservative		163	29.8	
Majority		221	40.4	
Turnout		547	52.0	
Registered electors		1,052		
Independent gain from Conservative		Swing		

=== Sudbury South ===
Sudbury South by-election: 10 November 1988
Party	Candidate	Votes	%	±%
Labour		577	56.2	
Conservative		450	43.8	
Majority		127	12.4	
Turnout		1,027	36.0	
Registered electors		2,853		
Labour gain from Conservative		Swing		

=== Lavenham ===
Lavenham by-election: 17 November 1988
Party	Candidate	Votes	%	±%
Conservative		272	41.3	
SLD		265	40.2	
Labour		122	18.5	
Majority		7	1.1	
Turnout		659	45.0	
Registered electors		1,464		
Conservative hold		Swing		

=== Hadleigh ===
Hadleigh by-election: 7 December 1989
Party	Candidate	Votes	%	±%
SLD		474	36.1	
Conservative		471	35.8	
Independent		261	19.8	
Labour		109	8.3	
Majority		3	0.2	
Turnout		1,315	25.0	
Registered electors		5,260		
SLD gain from Independent		Swing		
