= 1991 Babergh District Council election =

UK local election

- 2 May 1991

All 42 seats to Babergh District Council 22 seats needed for a majority

	First party	Second party
Party	Independent	Conservative
Seats won	16	15
Seat change	▼2	▼3
Popular vote	4,305	10,345
Percentage	13.9%	33.5%
Swing	▼10.7%	▲0.4%
	Third party	Fourth party
Party	Labour	Liberal Democrats
Seats won	6	5
Seat change	▲4	▲1
Popular vote	10,025	5,838
Percentage	32.4%	18.9%
Swing	▲8.7%	▲1.7%
- Winner of each seat at the 1991 Babergh District Council election.
Council control before election
No overall control
Council control after election
No overall control

The 1991 Babergh District Council election took place on 2 May 1991 to elect members of Babergh District Council in Suffolk, England. This was on the same day as other local elections.

== Summary ==
=== Election result ===
1991 Babergh District Council election
Party	Candidates	Seats	Gains	Losses	Net gain/loss	Seats %	Votes %	Votes	+/−
Independent	17	16	2	4	▼2	38.1	13.9	4,305	–10.7
Conservative	23	15	3	6	▼3	35.7	33.5	10,345	+0.4
Labour	22	6	4	0	▲4	14.3	32.4	10,025	+8.7
Liberal Democrats	11	5	2	1	▲1	11.9	18.9	5,838	+1.7
Ind. Conservative	2	0	0	0	Steady	0.0	1.3	410	N/A

== Ward results ==
Incumbent councillors standing for re-election are marked with an asterisk (*). Changes in seats do not take into account by-elections or defections.

=== Alton ===
Alton
Party	Candidate	Votes	%	±%
Independent	R. Cook*	Unopposed		
Registered electors		1,136		
Independent hold				

=== Berners ===
Berners
Party	Candidate	Votes	%	±%
Conservative	J. Holmes	Unopposed		
Registered electors		1,175		
Conservative gain from Independent				

=== Bildeston ===
Bildeston
Party	Candidate	Votes	%	±%
Independent	R. Gregory*	253	55.6	
Liberal Democrats	M. Gleed	116	25.5	
Labour	D. Wedderburn	86	18.9	
Majority		137	30.1	
Turnout		455	34.5	
Registered electors		1,328		
Independent hold		Swing		

=== Boxford ===
Boxford
Party	Candidate	Votes	%	±%
Independent	J. Lindsley*	Unopposed		
Registered electors		1,445		
Independent hold				

=== Brantham ===
Brantham
Party	Candidate	Votes	%	±%
Liberal Democrats	P. Revell*	Unopposed		
Registered electors		1,770		
Liberal Democrats gain from Independent				

=== Brett Vale ===
Brett Vale
Party	Candidate	Votes	%	±%
Conservative	C. Arthey	331	44.7	
Liberal Democrats	M. Gleed*	263	35.5	
Labour	G. Gould	146	19.7	
Majority		68	9.2	
Turnout		740	62.4	
Registered electors		1,186		
Conservative gain from Independent		Swing		

=== Brookvale ===
Brookvale
Party	Candidate	Votes	%	±%
Independent	J. Baxter*	Unopposed		
Registered electors		1,857		
Independent hold				

=== Bures St. Mary ===
Bures St. Mary
Party	Candidate	Votes	%	±%
Conservative	H. Engleheart*	Unopposed		
Registered electors		1,327		
Conservative hold				

=== Capel & Wenham ===
Capel & Wenham (2 seats)
Party	Candidate	Votes	%	±%
Liberal Democrats	A. Pollard*	842	38.5	
Liberal Democrats	S. Carpendale	766	35.0	
Labour	R. Pearce	308	14.1	
Labour	S. Thomas	271	12.4	
Majority		458	20.9	
Turnout		2,187	46.9	
Registered electors		2,511		
Liberal Democrats hold				
Liberal Democrats gain from Conservative				

=== Chadacre ===
Chadacre
Party	Candidate	Votes	%	±%
Independent	G. Ince*	Unopposed		
Registered electors		1,756		
Independent hold				

=== Copdock ===
Copdock
Party	Candidate	Votes	%	±%
Independent	P. Jones*	758	66.8	
Labour	J. Morton	376	33.2	
Majority		382	33.6	
Turnout		1,134	35.1	
Registered electors		3,234		
Independent hold		Swing		

=== Dodnash ===
Dodnash (2 seats)
Party	Candidate	Votes	%	±%
Independent	C. Wake-Walker	Unopposed		
Liberal Democrats	J. Heselden*	Unopposed		
Registered electors		2,763		
Independent hold				
Liberal Democrats hold				

=== Elmsett ===
Elmsett
Party	Candidate	Votes	%	±%
Conservative	T. Bailey-Smith*	Unopposed		
Registered electors		1,378		
Conservative hold				

=== Glemsford ===
Glemsford (2 seats)
Party	Candidate	Votes	%	±%
Conservative	J. Schaffer*	641	62.6	
Conservative	P. Stevens*	442	43.2	
Labour	D. Wedderburn	384	37.5	
Turnout		~1,024	41.0	
Registered electors		2,498		
Conservative hold				
Conservative hold				

=== Great Cornard North ===
Great Cornard North (2 seats)
Party	Candidate	Votes	%	±%
Labour	A. Bavington*	677	73.0	
Labour	V. Cocker*	664	71.6	
Conservative	S. Berry	261	28.1	
Conservative	D. Thomas	251	27.1	
Turnout		~928	30.8	
Registered electors		3,012		
Labour hold				
Labour hold				

=== Great Cornard South ===
Great Cornard South (2 seats)
Party	Candidate	Votes	%	±%
Conservative	P. Beer*	651	52.6	
Conservative	M. Newman	595	48.1	
Labour	R. Nandi	574	46.4	
Labour	S. Thorpe	526	42.5	
Turnout		~1,237	39.3	
Registered electors		3,149		
Conservative hold				
Conservative hold				

=== Hadleigh ===
Hadleigh (3 seats)
Party	Candidate	Votes	%	±%
Liberal Democrats	D. Grutchfield*	1,566	59.9	
Conservative	E. Banks	1,019	39.0	
Independent	J. Andrews*	925	35.4	
Liberal Democrats	R. Whiting	815	31.2	
Liberal Democrats	M. Pain	764	29.2	
Conservative	S. Williams	681	26.1	
Labour	P. Cook	500	19.1	
Turnout		~2,614	51.0	
Registered electors		5,126		
Liberal Democrats hold				
Conservative gain from Independent				
Independent hold				

=== Holbrook ===
Holbrook
Party	Candidate	Votes	%	±%
Independent	J. Godley*	Unopposed		
Registered electors		1,525		
Independent hold				

=== Lavenham ===
Lavenham
Party	Candidate	Votes	%	±%
Conservative	J. Hepworth*	395	50.2	
Independent	H. Bramer	209	26.6	
Labour	D. Hastie	183	23.3	
Majority		186	23.6	
Turnout		787	54.4	
Registered electors		1,446		
Conservative hold		Swing		

=== Leavenheath ===
Leavenheath
Party	Candidate	Votes	%	±%
Independent	A. Boram*	Unopposed		
Registered electors		1,730		
Independent hold				

=== Long Melford ===
Long Melford (2 seats)
Party	Candidate	Votes	%	±%
Independent	R. Kemp*	917	35.2	
Independent	R. Michette	504	19.4	
Conservative	K. Overman*	411	15.8	
Labour	R. Guyton	379	14.6	
Ind. Conservative	R. Roper	256	9.8	
Ind. Conservative	A. Hall	154	5.9	
Turnout		~1,341	51.1	
Registered electors		2,621		
Independent hold				
Independent gain from Conservative				

=== Nayland ===
Nayland
Party	Candidate	Votes	%	±%
Independent	D. Mitchell*	Unopposed		
Registered electors		925		
Independent hold				

=== North Cosford ===
North Cosford
Party	Candidate	Votes	%	±%
Independent	D. Hodge*	320	53.3	
Labour	S. Woods	280	46.7	
Majority		40	6.7	
Turnout		600	48.8	
Registered electors		1,229		
Independent hold		Swing		

=== Polstead & Layham ===
Polstead & Layham
Party	Candidate	Votes	%	±%
Independent	S. Wigglesworth	419	69.4	
Conservative	F. Gales	185	30.6	
Majority		234	38.7	
Turnout		604	53.5	
Registered electors		1,129		
Independent gain from Conservative		Swing		

=== Shotley ===
Shotley
Party	Candidate	Votes	%	±%
Independent	J. Law*	Unopposed		
Registered electors		1,726		
Independent hold				

=== Sudbury East ===
Sudbury East (2 seats)
Party	Candidate	Votes	%	±%
Labour	S. Cann*	910	52.7	
Labour	R. Titmus	610	35.3	
Conservative	J. Colman	546	31.6	
Turnout		~1,520	48.0	
Registered electors		2,828		
Labour gain from Liberal Democrats				
Labour gain from Conservative				

=== Sudbury North ===
Sudbury North (2 seats)
Party	Candidate	Votes	%	±%
Conservative	J. Sayers	628	33.9	
Labour	S. Gibbs	614	33.2	
Conservative	H. Singh*	553	29.9	
Labour	V. Waters	540	29.2	
Turnout		~1,242	37.0	
Registered electors		3,157		
Conservative hold				
Labour gain from Conservative				

=== Sudbury South ===
Sudbury South (2 seats)
Party	Candidate	Votes	%	±%
Labour	E. Wiles*	789	39.4	
Conservative	S. Byham*	669	33.4	
Labour	R. Foster	543	27.1	
Conservative	D. Simmons	472	23.6	
Turnout		~1,458	45.0	
Registered electors		2,998		
Labour gain from Conservative				
Conservative hold				

=== Waldingfield ===
Waldingfield (2 seats)
Party	Candidate	Votes	%	±%
Conservative	C. Spence*	646	32.2	
Conservative	A. St Aubin D'Ancey	525	26.2	
Liberal Democrats	K. Watkins	460	22.9	
Labour	J. Skinner	371	18.5	
Labour	C. Richardson	294	14.7	
Turnout		~1,291	44.7	
Registered electors		2,956		
Conservative hold				
Conservative hold				

=== West Samford ===
West Samford
Party	Candidate	Votes	%	±%
Conservative	M. Bancroft	443	64.3	
Liberal Democrats	R. Thomas	246	35.7	
Majority		197	28.6	
Turnout		689	54.5	
Registered electors		1,264		
Conservative hold		Swing		

== By-elections ==
=== Bildeston ===
Bildeston by-election: 13 June 1991
Party	Candidate	Votes	%	±%
Independent		253	55.6	
Alliance		116	25.5	
Labour		86	18.9	
Majority		137	30.1	
Turnout		455	34.5	
Registered electors		1,319		
Independent hold		Swing		

=== Dodnash ===
Dodnash by-election: 20 August 1992
Party	Candidate	Votes	%	±%
Conservative		526	53.5	
Alliance		322	32.7	
Labour		136	13.8	
Majority		204	20.7	
Turnout		984	35.6	
Registered electors		2,764		
Conservative gain from Independent		Swing		
