= 2003 Babergh District Council election =

2003 English local government election

- 1 May 2003

All 43 seats to Babergh District Council 22 seats needed for a majority

	First party	Second party
Party	Liberal Democrats	Conservative
Seats won	18	11
Seat change	▲5	▲1
Popular vote	11,025	9,440
Percentage	39.8%	34.1%
Swing	▲9.3%	▲4.2%
	Third party	Fourth party
Party	Independent	Labour
Seats won	8	6
Seat change	▼6	▲1
Popular vote	3,713	2,885
Percentage	13.4%	10.4%
Swing	▼9.5%	▼6.3%
- Winner of each seat at the 2003 Babergh District Council election.
Control before election
No overall control
Control after election
No overall control

The 2003 Babergh District Council election took place on 1 May 2003 to elect members of Babergh District Council in Suffolk, England. This was on the same day as other local elections.

== Summary ==
=== Election result ===
2003 Babergh District Council election
Party	Candidates	Seats	Gains	Losses	Net gain/loss	Seats %	Votes %	Votes	+/−
Liberal Democrats	26	18	N/A	N/A	▲5	41.9	39.8	11,025	+9.3
Conservative	27	11	N/A	N/A	▲1	25.6	34.1	9,440	+4.2
Independent	11	8	N/A	N/A	▼6	18.6	13.4	3,713	–9.5
Labour	11	6	N/A	N/A	▲1	14.0	10.4	2,885	–6.3
Green	1	0	N/A	N/A	Steady	0.0	1.1	315	N/A
UKIP	2	0	N/A	N/A	Steady	0.0	1.1	309	N/A

3 Conservatives, 3 Independents and 2 Liberal Democrats were elected unopposed.

== Ward results ==
Incumbent councillors standing for re-election are marked with an asterisk (*). Changes in seats do not take into account by-elections or defections.

=== Alton ===
Alton (2 seats)
Party	Candidate	Votes	%	±%
Liberal Democrats	David Wood*	686	58.9	
Liberal Democrats	Duncan Read*	587	50.4	
Independent	Kenneth Felstead	380	32.6	
Conservative	Patricia Cave	305	26.2	
Turnout		~1,164	37.3	
Registered electors		3,120		
Liberal Democrats hold				
Liberal Democrats win (new seat)				

=== Berners ===
Berners (2 seats)
Party	Candidate	Votes	%	±%
Liberal Democrats	Wendy Sadler	856	79.4	
Liberal Democrats	Penny Clarke*	723	67.1	
Conservative	Peter Burgoyne	267	24.8	
Turnout		~1,078	35.7	
Registered electors		3,016		
Liberal Democrats hold				
Liberal Democrats win (new seat)				

=== Boxford ===
Boxford
Party	Candidate	Votes	%	±%
Liberal Democrats	Bryn Hurren*	Unopposed		
Registered electors		1,730		
Liberal Democrats hold		Swing		

=== Brett Vale ===
Brett Vale
Party	Candidate	Votes	%	±%
Conservative	Desmond Keane	Unopposed		
Registered electors		1,634		
Conservative gain from Independent				

=== Brook ===
Brook (2 seats)
Party	Candidate	Votes	%
Independent	Peter Jones*	611	56.4
Conservative	Nicholas Ridley	492	45.4
Liberal Democrats	Dale Cartwright	471	43.4
Turnout		~1,084	34.8
Registered electors		3,114	
Independent win (new seat)			
Conservative win (new seat)			

=== Bures St. Mary ===
Bures St. Mary
Party	Candidate	Votes	%	±%
Conservative	Peter Holbrook*	Unopposed		
Registered electors		1,408		
Conservative hold				

=== Chadacre ===
Chadacre
Party	Candidate	Votes	%	±%
Independent	James Long*	Unopposed		
Registered electors		1,553		
Independent hold				

=== Dodnash ===
Dodnash (2 seats)
Party	Candidate	Votes	%	±%
Liberal Democrats	Michael Miller	753	44.2	
Conservative	John Hinton	634	37.3	
Green	Ian St John	315	18.5	
Turnout		~1,260	44.5	
Registered electors		2,831		
Liberal Democrats hold				
Conservative hold				

=== Glemsford & Stanstead ===
Glemsford & Stanstead (2 seats)
Party	Candidate	Votes	%
Liberal Democrats	Rex Thake*	Unopposed	
Independent	Len Young*	Unopposed	
Registered electors		2,901	
Liberal Democrats win (new seat)			
Independent win (new seat)			

=== Great Cornard North ===
Great Cornard North (2 seats)
Party	Candidate	Votes	%	±%
Labour	Anthony Bavington*	280	38.5	
Labour	Neil MacMaster	262	36.0	
Conservative	Carol Beer	253	34.8	
Conservative	David Thomas	218	30.0	
UKIP	Derek Allen	195	26.8	
Turnout		~673	22.1	
Registered electors		3,045		
Labour hold				
Labour hold				

=== Great Cornard South ===
Great Cornard South (2 seats)
Party	Candidate	Votes	%	±%
Conservative	Peter Beer	371	44.4	
Conservative	Humphrey Todd	353	42.2	
Labour	Susan Gibson	234	28.0	
Labour	Patrick Treacy*	215	25.7	
Liberal Democrats	Richard Platt	117	14.0	
UKIP	Cynthia Allen	114	13.6	
Turnout		~734	24.6	
Registered electors		2,986		
Conservative gain from Labour				
Conservative gain from Labour				

=== Hadleigh North ===
Hadleigh North (2 seats)
Party	Candidate	Votes	%
Labour	James Quinlan	360	34.5
Labour	Keith Grimsey	317	30.4
Independent	Eileen Banks*	269	25.8
Liberal Democrats	Peter Matthews	260	24.9
Liberal Democrats	Ann Stephenson*	251	24.1
Conservative	Pat White	154	14.8
Turnout		~866	29.9
Registered electors		2,896	
Labour win (new seat)			
Labour win (new seat)			

=== Hadleigh South ===
Hadleigh South (2 seats)
Party	Candidate	Votes	%
Liberal Democrats	David Grutchfield*	644	48.5
Liberal Democrats	Jean Chapman	369	27.8
Independent	Jan Byrne	266	20.0
Conservative	Sheila Webb	232	17.5
Labour	Penelope Cook	186	14.0
Labour	Susan Monks	151	11.4
Turnout		~1,015	34.4
Registered electors		2,951	
Liberal Democrats win (new seat)			
Liberal Democrats win (new seat)			

=== Holbrook ===
Holbrook
Party	Candidate	Votes	%	±%
Independent	David Rose	380	57.2	
Liberal Democrats	Annette Steggles	284	42.8	
Majority		96	14.5	
Turnout		664	43.9	
Registered electors		1,517		
Independent hold		Swing		

=== Lavenham ===
Lavenham
Party	Candidate	Votes	%	±%
Conservative	John Roberts*	506	73.0	
Liberal Democrats	Fiona Jenkins	187	27.0	
Majority		319	46.0	
Turnout		693	45.3	
Registered electors		1,535		
Conservative hold		Swing		

=== Leavenheath ===
Leavenheath
Party	Candidate	Votes	%	±%
Conservative	Jennifer Jenkins	Unopposed		
Registered electors		1,439		
Conservative hold				

=== Long Melford ===
Long Melford (2 seats)
Party	Candidate	Votes	%	±%
Independent	Richard Kemp*	800	65.0	
Independent	John Brand*	571	46.4	
Conservative	David Burch	430	35.0	
Turnout		~1,069	34.3	
Registered electors		3,118		
Independent hold				
Independent hold				

=== Lower Brett ===
Lower Brett
Party	Candidate	Votes	%
Independent	Susan Wigglesworth*	Unopposed	
Registered electors		1,685	
Independent win (new seat)			

=== Mid Samford ===
Mid Samford (2 seats)
Party	Candidate	Votes	%
Liberal Democrats	Susan Carpendale*	781	50.1
Conservative	Gerald White	778	49.9
Conservative	David Yorke-Edwards	648	41.5
Liberal Democrats	Leonard Johnson*	633	40.6
Turnout		~1,481	45.3
Registered electors		3,271	
Liberal Democrats win (new seat)			
Conservative win (new seat)			

=== Nayland ===
Nayland
Party	Candidate	Votes	%	±%
Liberal Democrats	Christopher Hunt	428	50.5	
Conservative	John Cave*	420	49.5	
Majority		8	0.9	
Turnout		848	53.9	
Registered electors		1,582		
Liberal Democrats gain from Conservative		Swing		

=== North Cosford ===
North Cosford
Party	Candidate	Votes	%	±%
Independent	Clive Arthey*	436	54.3	
Conservative	Dick Sands	367	45.7	
Majority		69	8.6	
Turnout		803	45.4	
Registered electors		1,793		
Independent hold		Swing		

=== Pinewood ===
Pinewood (2 seats)
Party	Candidate	Votes	%
Liberal Democrats	David Busby	358	58.4
Liberal Democrats	Colin Kerr	309	50.4
Conservative	Colin Hurcombe	255	41.6
Turnout		~625	18.7
Registered electors		3,345	
Liberal Democrats win (new seat)			
Liberal Democrats win (new seat)			

=== South Cosford ===
South Cosford
Party	Candidate	Votes	%
Liberal Democrats	Brian Lazenby*	438	62.1
Conservative	Joyce Jardine	267	37.9
Majority		171	24.2
Turnout		705	42.0
Registered electors		1,691	
Liberal Democrats win (new seat)			

=== Sudbury East ===
Sudbury East (2 seats)
Party	Candidate	Votes	%	±%
Labour	Jack Owen	396	37.0	
Liberal Democrats	Albert Pearce	343	32.1	
Conservative	Sylvia Byham*	331	30.9	
Turnout		~846	26.6	
Registered electors		3,181		
Labour gain from Conservative				
Liberal Democrats gain from Independent				

=== Sudbury North ===
Sudbury North (2 seats)
Party	Candidate	Votes	%	±%
Conservative	John Sayers*	412	43.5	
Labour	Nicholas Irwin*	322	34.0	
Conservative	Raymond Smith	303	32.0	
Liberal Democrats	Andrew Welsh	214	22.6	
Turnout		~745	24.2	
Registered electors		3,078		
Conservative hold				
Labour hold				

=== Sudbury South ===
Sudbury South (2 seats)
Party	Candidate	Votes	%	±%
Liberal Democrats	Nigel Bennett	381	46.3	
Liberal Democrats	Martyn Booth*	365	44.4	
Conservative	Peter Goodchild	280	34.0	
Labour	David Regester	162	19.7	
Turnout		~742	23.1	
Registered electors		3,199		
Liberal Democrats gain from Independent				
Liberal Democrats hold				

=== Waldingfield ===
Waldingfield (2 seats)
Party	Candidate	Votes	%	±%
Conservative	Colin Spence*	664	53.1	
Liberal Democrats	Frances Bates	587	46.9	
Conservative	David Jardine	500	39.9	
Turnout		~1,101	34.2	
Registered electors		3,220		
Conservative hold				
Liberal Democrats gain from Conservative				
