= 2019 Babergh District Council election =

2019 UK local government election

- 2 May 2019

All 32 seats for Babergh District Council 17 seats needed for a majority

	First party	Second party	Third party
Party	Conservative	Independent	Green
Seats won	15	8	4
Popular vote	11,791	6,572	7,887
Percentage	34.8%	19.5%	23.3%
Swing	▼5.5%	▲6.9%	▲10.6%
	Fourth party	Fifth party
Party	Liberal Democrats	Labour
Seats won	3	2
Popular vote	3,478	3,253
Percentage	10.3%	9.6%
Swing	▼2.1%	▼8.0%
- Winner of each seat at the 2019 Babergh District Council election
Council control before election
Conservative
Council control after election
No overall control

The 2019 Babergh District Council election took place on 2 May 2019 to elect members of Babergh District Council in England. This was on the same day as other local elections.

== Summary ==
=== Election result ===
2019 Babergh District Council election
Party	Candidates	Seats	Gains	Losses	Net gain/loss	Seats %	Votes %	Votes	+/−
Conservative	30	15	1	1	▼16	46.9	34.8	11,791	–5.5
Green	27	4	0	0	▲4	12.5	23.3	7,887	+10.6
Independent	11	8	1	1	Steady	25.0	19.5	6,572	+6.9
Liberal Democrats	11	3	0	0	Steady	9.4	10.3	3,478	–2.1
Labour	11	2	0	0	▲1	6.3	9.6	3,253	–8.0
UKIP	2	0	0	0	Steady	0.0	1.1	387	–3.2

== Ward results ==
=== Assington ===
Assington
Party	Candidate	Votes	%
Independent	Lee Parker	415	49.5
Conservative	David Holland	278	33.1
Green	Laura Smith	146	17.4
Turnout		843	39.4
Independent win (new seat)			

=== Box Vale ===
Box Vale
Party	Candidate	Votes	%
Liberal Democrats	Bryn Hurren	833	80.1
Conservative	Jacqueline Rawlinson	207	19.9
Turnout		1,059	47.8
Liberal Democrats win (new seat)			

=== Brantham ===
Brantham
Party	Candidate	Votes	%
Independent	Alastair McCraw	712	85.9
Conservative	William Shropshire	59	7.1
Green	Caroline Wheeler	58	7.0
Turnout		833	40.6
Independent win (new seat)			

=== Brett Vale ===
Brett Vale
Party	Candidate	Votes	%
Conservative	John Ward	458	46.8
Independent	Stephen Laing	314	29.7
Green	Philippa Draper	211	19.9
Independent	Stephen Williams	44	4.2
Turnout		1,033	40.8
Conservative win (new seat)			

=== Bures St. Mary & Nayland ===
Bures St. Mary & Nayland
Party	Candidate	Votes	%
Conservative	Melanie Barrett	405	53.2
Green	Miriam Burns	356	46.8
Turnout		778	34.2
Conservative win (new seat)			

=== Capel St. Mary ===
Capel St. Mary
Party	Candidate	Votes	%
Liberal Democrats	Susan Carpendale	681	79.1
Conservative	Delme Thompson	180	20.9
Turnout		892	37.6
Liberal Democrats win (new seat)			

=== Chadacre ===
Chadacre (2)
Party	Candidate	Votes	%
Independent	Stephen Plumb	983	64.9
Conservative	Michael Holt	780	51.5
Green	Luis Orna Diaz	372	24.6
Green	Felix Reeves Whymark	324	21.4
Turnout		1,514	31.3
Independent hold			
Conservative win (new seat)			

=== Copdock & Washbrook ===
Copdock & Washbrook
Party	Candidate	Votes	%
Liberal Democrats	David Busby	604	61.4
Conservative	Barry Gasper	380	38.6
Turnout		1,022	39.8
Liberal Democrats win (new seat)			

=== East Bergholt ===
East Bergholt
Party	Candidate	Votes	%
Independent	Alan Hinton	432	44.4
Conservative	Dominic Torringtom	292	30.0
Green	Sallie Davies	250	25.7
Turnout		980	42.9
Independent win (new seat)			

=== Ganges ===
Ganges
Party	Candidate	Votes	%
Independent	Derek Davis	561	70.9
Conservative	Paul Clarke	111	14.0
Green	Sharon-Anne Kennedy	65	8.2
Liberal Democrats	Anthony Ingram	54	6.8
Turnout		797	42.0
Independent win (new seat)			

=== Great Cornard ===
Great Cornard
Party	Candidate	Votes	%
Conservative	Peter Beer	703	39.3
Conservative	Mark Newman	682	38.2
Conservative	Honor Grainger-Howard	640	35.8
Labour	Anthony Bavington	553	30.9
Labour	Tracey Welsh	504	28.2
Labour	Stewart Sheridan	463	25.9
Green	Dean Walton	372	20.8
Green	Andrew Liffen	309	17.3
Green	Tobias Horkan	290	16.2
Liberal Democrats	Marjorie Bark	254	14.2
Turnout		1,787	25.4
Conservative win (new seat)			
Conservative win (new seat)			
Conservative win (new seat)			

=== Hadleigh North ===
Hadleigh North
Party	Candidate	Votes	%
Conservative	Sian Dawson	236	36.0
Liberal Democrats	Karen Harman	146	22.3
Labour	Angela Wiltshire	143	21.8
Green	Peter Lynn	131	20.0
Turnout		669	32.5
Conservative hold			

=== Hadleigh South ===
Hadleigh South
Party	Candidate	Votes	%
Independent	Kathryn Grandon-White	832	54.8
Conservative	Michael Fraser	436	28.7
Conservative	Matthew Pescott-Frost	392	25.8
Green	Amy Aylett	368	24.2
Labour	Rickaby Shearly-Sanders	328	21.6
Green	Sophie Ship	245	16.1
Turnout		1,518	34.0
Independent gain from Conservative			
Conservative hold			

=== Lavenham ===
Lavenham
Party	Candidate	Votes	%
Conservative	Margaret Maybury	745	45.9
Independent	Clive Arthey	704	43.4
Conservative	Philip Faircloth-Mutton	624	38.5
Green	Karen Marshall	541	33.4
UKIP	Leon Stedman	254	15.7
Turnout		1,622	39.1
Conservative hold			
Independent win (new seat)			

=== Long Melford ===
Long Melford
Party	Candidate	Votes	%
Independent	John Nunn	1,276	76.4
Conservative	Elisabeth Malvisi	625	37.4
Green	Janet Smith	383	22.9
Green	John Smith	206	12.3
Turnout		1,670	36.4
Independent hold			
Conservative gain from Independent			

=== North West Cosford ===
North West Cosford
Party	Candidate	Votes	%
Green	Robert Lindsay	690	70.6
Conservative	Alexandra Dawson	287	29.4
Turnout		985	45.6
Green win (new seat)			

=== Orwell ===
Orwell
Party	Candidate	Votes	%
Green	Vivienne Gould	654	72.4
Conservative	Nicholas Ridley	249	27.6
Turnout		928	44.8
Green win (new seat)			

=== South East Cosford ===
South East Cosford
Party	Candidate	Votes	%
Green	Leigh Jamieson	708	61.7
Conservative	Alan Ferguson	440	38.3
Turnout		1,163	54.9
Green win (new seat)			

=== Sproughton & Pinewood ===
Sproughton & Pinewood
Party	Candidate	Votes	%
Conservative	Zachary Norman	508	47.8
Green	Richard Hardacre	437	41.1
Labour Co-op	David Plowman	436	41.1
Conservative	Christopher Hudson	352	33.1
Turnout		1,062	24.1
Conservative win (new seat)			
Green win (new seat)			

=== Stour ===
Stour
Party	Candidate	Votes	%
Conservative	Mary McLaren	292	31.2
Independent	Christopher Sawyer	259	27.6
Liberal Democrats	Michael Bamford	225	24.0
Green	Lyndon Ship	161	17.2
Turnout		946	40.5
Conservative win (new seat)			

=== Sudbury North East ===
Sudbury North East
Party	Candidate	Votes	%
Labour	Alison Owen	190	36.4
Conservative	Gary Quinlan	136	26.1
UKIP	Paul Dalley	133	25.5
Green	Theresa Munson	63	12.1
Turnout		527	25.5
Labour win (new seat)			

=== Sudbury North West ===
Sudbury North West
Party	Candidate	Votes	%
Conservative	Janice Osborne	411	33.1
Labour	Trevor Cresswell	372	30.0
Conservative	Simon Barrett	361	29.1
Liberal Democrats	Nigel Bennett	303	24.4
Labour	Daniel Williams	285	23.0
Green	Michael Chapman	216	17.4
Liberal Democrats	Robert Spivey	212	17.1
Green	John Burch	166	13.4
Turnout		1,241	30.8
Conservative win (new seat)			
Labour win (new seat)			

=== Sudbury South East ===
Sudbury South East
Party	Candidate	Votes	%
Conservative	Adrian Osborne	260	42.2
Labour	Luke Cresswell	210	34.1
Green	Heather James	79	12.8
Liberal Democrats	Richard Platt	67	10.9
Turnout		627	30.8
Conservative win (new seat)			

=== Sudbury South West ===
Sudbury South West
Party	Candidate	Votes	%
Conservative	Susan Ayres	262	35.6
Labour	Nicola Dixon	205	27.9
Liberal Democrats	Andrew Welsh	99	13.5
Green	Julie Fowles-Smith	86	11.7
Independent	Robert Darvell	84	11.4
Turnout		745	34.8
Conservative win (new seat)			

== Changes 2019–2023 ==
- Sue Ayres (Sudbury South West) and Margaret Maybury (Lavenham), both elected as Conservatives, left the party on 26 September 2019 to sit as independents, citing policy disagreements including a proposed renaming of the council.
- John Ward (Brett Vale), Jan Osborne (Sudbury North West), Adrian Osborne (Sudbury South East) and Mary McLaren (Stour), all elected as Conservatives, left the Conservative group in late April 2022 to reform the Independent Conservative group, following a dispute over the composition of the cabinet.
- Trevor Cresswell (Sudbury North West), elected as a Labour candidate, became an independent.

== By-elections ==
=== Great Cornard ===
The Great Cornard by-election was triggered by the resignation of councillor Honor Grainger-Howard.

Great Cornard by-election: 6 May 2021
Party	Candidate	Votes	%	±%
Conservative	Simon Barrett	971	46.4	+9.0
Labour	Jake Thomas	602	28.7	−0.7
Liberal Democrats	Marjorie Bark	287	13.7	+0.2
Green	James Killbery	234	11.2	−8.6
Majority		369	17.7	
Turnout		2,130	29.8	
Registered electors		7,137		
Conservative hold		Swing	▲4.9	
