= 2007 Babergh District Council election =

2007 English local government election

- 3 May 2007

All 42 seats to Babergh District Council 22 seats needed for a majority

	First party	Second party
Party	Conservative	Liberal Democrats
Seats won	19	16
Seat change	▲8	▼2
Popular vote	13,288	15,040
Percentage	36.6%	41.4%
Swing	▲2.5%	▲1.6%
	Third party	Fourth party
Party	Independent	Labour
Seats won	8	0
Seat change	Steady	▼6
Popular vote	4,237	2,310
Percentage	11.7%	6.4%
Swing	▼1.7%	▼4.0%
- Winner of each seat at the 2007 Babergh District Council election.
Control before election
No overall control
Control after election
No overall control

The 2007 Babergh District Council election took place on 3 May 2007 to elect members of Babergh District Council in Suffolk, England. This was on the same day as other local elections.

== Summary ==
=== Election result ===
2007 Babergh District Council election
Party	Candidates	Seats	Gains	Losses	Net gain/loss	Seats %	Votes %	Votes	+/−
Conservative	30	19	8	0	▲8	44.2	36.6	13,288	+2.5
Liberal Democrats	28	16	1	3	▼2	37.2	41.4	15,040	+1.6
Independent	9	8	0	0	Steady	18.6	11.7	4,237	–1.7
Labour	9	0	0	6	▼6	0.0	6.4	2,310	–4.0
UKIP	11	0	0	0	Steady	0.0	4.0	1,459	+2.9

== Ward results ==
Incumbent councillors standing for re-election are marked with an asterisk (*). Changes in seats do not take into account by-elections or defections.

=== Alton ===
Alton (2 seats)
Party	Candidate	Votes	%	±%
Liberal Democrats	Trot Ward	971	63.5	
Liberal Democrats	David Wood*	954	62.4	
Conservative	Gordon Jones	559	36.5	
Turnout		~1,529	48.1	
Registered electors		3,197		
Liberal Democrats hold				
Liberal Democrats hold				

=== Berners ===
Berners (2 seats)
Party	Candidate	Votes	%	±%
Liberal Democrats	Penny Clarke*	802	66.2	
Liberal Democrats	Tony Roberts	762	62.9	
Conservative	Richard Searle	410	33.8	
Turnout		~1,212	39.3	
Registered electors		3,017		
Liberal Democrats hold				
Liberal Democrats hold				

=== Boxford ===
Boxford
Party	Candidate	Votes	%	±%
Liberal Democrats	Bryn Hurren*	633	68.7	
Conservative	Carey Fraulo	288	31.3	
Majority		345	37.5	
Turnout		921	53.5	
Registered electors		1,720		
Liberal Democrats hold		Swing		

=== Brett Vale ===
Brett Vale
Party	Candidate	Votes	%	±%
Conservative	Desmond Keane*	474	63.0	
Liberal Democrats	Nigel Adam	278	37.0	
Majority		196	26.0	
Turnout		752	45.6	
Registered electors		1,659		
Conservative hold		Swing		

=== Brook ===
Brook (2 seats)
Party	Candidate	Votes	%	±%
Conservative	Nick Ridley*	691	36.1	
Independent	Peter Jones*	650	34.0	
Liberal Democrats	Michael Fenwick	571	29.9	
Turnout		~1,914	38.3	
Registered electors		3,252		
Conservative hold				
Independent hold				

=== Bures St. Mary ===
Bures St. Mary
Party	Candidate	Votes	%	±%
Conservative	Peter Holbrook*	Unopposed		
Registered electors		1,449		
Conservative hold				

=== Chadacre ===
Chadacre
Party	Candidate	Votes	%	±%
Independent	James Long*	Unopposed		
Registered electors		1,610		
Independent hold				

=== Dodnash ===
Dodnash (2 seats)
Party	Candidate	Votes	%	±%
Liberal Democrats	Michael Miller*	829	48.8	
Conservative	John Hinton*	728	42.8	
UKIP	Richard Hudson-Smith	142	8.4	
UKIP	Robert Hutchinson	129	7.6	
Turnout		~1,364	46.4	
Registered electors		2,938		
Liberal Democrats hold				
Conservative hold				

=== Glemsford & Stanstead ===
Glemsford & Stanstead (2 seats)
Party	Candidate	Votes	%	±%
Liberal Democrats	Rex Thake*	613	42.5	
Independent	Len Young*	488	33.8	
Conservative	Peter Patrick	343	23.8	
Turnout		~951	32.2	
Registered electors		2,957		
Liberal Democrats hold				
Independent hold				

=== Great Cornard North ===
Great Cornard North (2 seats)
Party	Candidate	Votes	%	±%
Conservative	Carol Todd	459	57.6	
Conservative	Humphrey Todd	455	57.1	
Labour	Tony Bavington*	338	42.4	
Labour	Neil MacMaster*	322	40.4	
Turnout		~829	26.7	
Registered electors		3,106		
Conservative gain from Labour				
Conservative gain from Labour				

=== Great Cornard South ===
Great Cornard South (2 seats)
Party	Candidate	Votes	%	±%
Conservative	Peter Beer*	454	53.3	
Conservative	Mark Newman	438	51.4	
Liberal Democrats	Cathy Press	223	26.2	
Liberal Democrats	Lesley Ford-Platt	208	24.5	
Labour	Roger McCartney	174	20.4	
Labour	Pam White	162	19.0	
Turnout		~868	28.0	
Registered electors		3,102		
Conservative hold				
Conservative hold				

=== Hadleigh North ===
Hadleigh North (2 seats)
Party	Candidate	Votes	%	±%
Conservative	Brian Riley	381	25.0	
Liberal Democrats	David Warner	358	23.5	
Independent	Jan Byrne	328	21.5	
Liberal Democrats	Richard Whiting	318	20.8	
Labour	Keith Grimsey*	292	19.1	
UKIP	Reginald Smith	166	10.9	
UKIP	Roy O'Shaughnessy	118	7.7	
Turnout		~1,123	33.7	
Registered electors		3,333		
Conservative gain from Labour				
Liberal Democrats gain from Labour				

=== Hadleigh South ===
Hadleigh South (2 seats)
Party	Candidate	Votes	%	±%
Liberal Democrats	David Grutchfield*	794	70.6	
Liberal Democrats	Mary Munson	690	61.3	
Conservative	Peter Burgoyne	330	29.4	
Turnout		~1,099	36.4	
Registered electors		3,020		
Liberal Democrats hold				
Liberal Democrats hold				

=== Holbrook ===
Holbrook
Party	Candidate	Votes	%	±%
Independent	David Rose*	Unopposed		
Registered electors		1,607		
Independent hold				

=== Lavenham ===
Lavenham
Party	Candidate	Votes	%	±%
Conservative	Philip Gibson	Unopposed		
Registered electors		1,552		
Conservative hold				

=== Leavenheath ===
Leavenheath
Party	Candidate	Votes	%	±%
Conservative	Jennie Jenkins*	455	67.7	
Liberal Democrats	Peter Turner	217	32.3	
Majority		238	35.4	
Turnout		672	45.6	
Registered electors		1,481		
Conservative hold		Swing		

=== Long Melford ===
Long Melford (2 seats)
Party	Candidate	Votes	%	±%
Independent	Richard Kemp*	878	63.2	
Independent	John Brand*	696	50.1	
Conservative	David Burch	512	36.8	
Turnout		~1,229	38.7	
Registered electors		3,175		
Independent hold				
Independent hold				

=== Lower Brett ===
Lower Brett
Party	Candidate	Votes	%	±%
Independent	Sue Wigglesworth*	620	83.1	
UKIP	Linda Redford	126	16.9	
Majority		494	66.2	
Turnout		746	44.1	
Registered electors		1,716		
Independent hold		Swing		

=== Mid Samford ===
Mid Samford (2 seats)
Party	Candidate	Votes	%	±%
Liberal Democrats	Sue Carpendale*	966	51.6	
Conservative	Gerald White*	759	40.5	
Liberal Democrats	Louise Banyard	747	39.9	
UKIP	John Smith	147	7.9	
UKIP	Jo Smith	137	7.3	
Turnout		~1,590	49.3	
Registered electors		3,227		
Liberal Democrats hold				
Conservative hold				

=== Nayland ===
Nayland
Party	Candidate	Votes	%	±%
Conservative	Richard Cave	464	53.8	
Liberal Democrats	Christopher Hunt*	307	35.6	
UKIP	James Carver	92	10.7	
Majority		157	18.2	
Turnout		863	56.4	
Registered electors		1,539		
Conservative gain from Liberal Democrats		Swing		

=== North Cosford ===
North Cosford
Party	Candidate	Votes	%	±%
Independent	Clive Arthey*	577	63.5	
Conservative	Taz Kavvadias	331	36.5	
Majority		246	27.1	
Turnout		908	49.9	
Registered electors		1,836		
Independent hold		Swing		

=== Pinewood ===
Pinewood (2 seats)
Party	Candidate	Votes	%	±%
Liberal Democrats	David Busby*	473	55.5	
Liberal Democrats	Leonard Johnson*	451	52.9	
Conservative	Ian McIntyre	379	44.5	
Turnout		~847	24.8	
Registered electors		3,417		
Liberal Democrats hold				
Liberal Democrats hold				

=== South Cosford ===
South Cosford
Party	Candidate	Votes	%	±%
Liberal Democrats	Brian Lazenby*	451	59.0	
Conservative	Patricia Cave	314	41.0	
Majority		137	17.9	
Turnout		765	42.9	
Registered electors		1,796		
Liberal Democrats hold		Swing		

=== Sudbury East ===
Sudbury East (2 seats)
Party	Candidate	Votes	%	±%
Conservative	Adrian Osborne	480	42.4	
Conservative	Dean Walton	418	37.0	
Labour	Jack Owen*	341	30.2	
Liberal Democrats	Tony Platt	310	27.4	
Labour	Tim Richmond	262	23.2	
Turnout		~1,057	32.1	
Registered electors		3,294		
Conservative gain from Labour				
Conservative gain from Liberal Democrats				

=== Sudbury North ===
Sudbury North (2 seats)
Party	Candidate	Votes	%	±%
Conservative	John Sayers*	531	48.9	
Conservative	Ray Smith	403	37.1	
Liberal Democrats	Deborah Thomas	282	26.0	
Labour	Nick Irwin*	272	25.1	
Liberal Democrats	Marion Press	205	18.9	
Labour	Torsten Friedag	147	13.5	
Turnout		~970	31.0	
Registered electors		3,131		
Conservative hold				
Conservative gain from Labour				

=== Sudbury South ===
Sudbury South (2 seats)
Party	Candidate	Votes	%	±%
Liberal Democrats	Nigel Bennett*	603	58.8	
Liberal Democrats	Martyn Booth*	527	51.4	
Conservative	Errol Newman	317	30.9	
Conservative	David Thomas	275	26.8	
UKIP	Donald Martin	106	10.3	
UKIP	Jane Martin	91	8.9	
Turnout		~1,015	31.0	
Registered electors		3,275		
Liberal Democrats hold				
Liberal Democrats hold				

=== Waldingfield ===
Waldingfield (2 seats)
Party	Candidate	Votes	%	±%
Conservative	Colin Spence*	865	55.2	
Conservative	Jenny Antill	775	49.5	
Liberal Democrats	Frances Bates*	497	31.7	
UKIP	Leon Stedman	205	13.1	
Turnout		~1,312	40.4	
Registered electors		3,249		
Conservative hold				
Conservative gain from Liberal Democrats				

== By-elections ==
Hadleigh North By-Election 8 November 2007
Party	Candidate	Votes	%	±%
Liberal Democrats	Richard Whiting	446	49.0	+25.5
Conservative	Peter Burgoyne	261	28.6	+3.6
Independent	Jan Byrne	138	15.1	−6.4
UKIP	Reginald Smith	66	7.2	−3.7
Majority		185	20.4	
Turnout		911	27.4	
Liberal Democrats hold		Swing		

Great Cornard North By-Election 22 July 2010
Party	Candidate	Votes	%	±%
Labour	Anthony Bavington	340	45.1	+2.7
Conservative	Martin Fryer	201	26.7	−30.9
Liberal Democrats	Richard Platt	141	18.7	+18.7
UKIP	Leon Stedman	72	9.5	+9.5
Majority		139	18.4	
Turnout		754	22.8	
Labour gain from Conservative		Swing		
