= Babergh District =

Coordinates: 52.048°N 0.948°E

- Non-metropolitan district
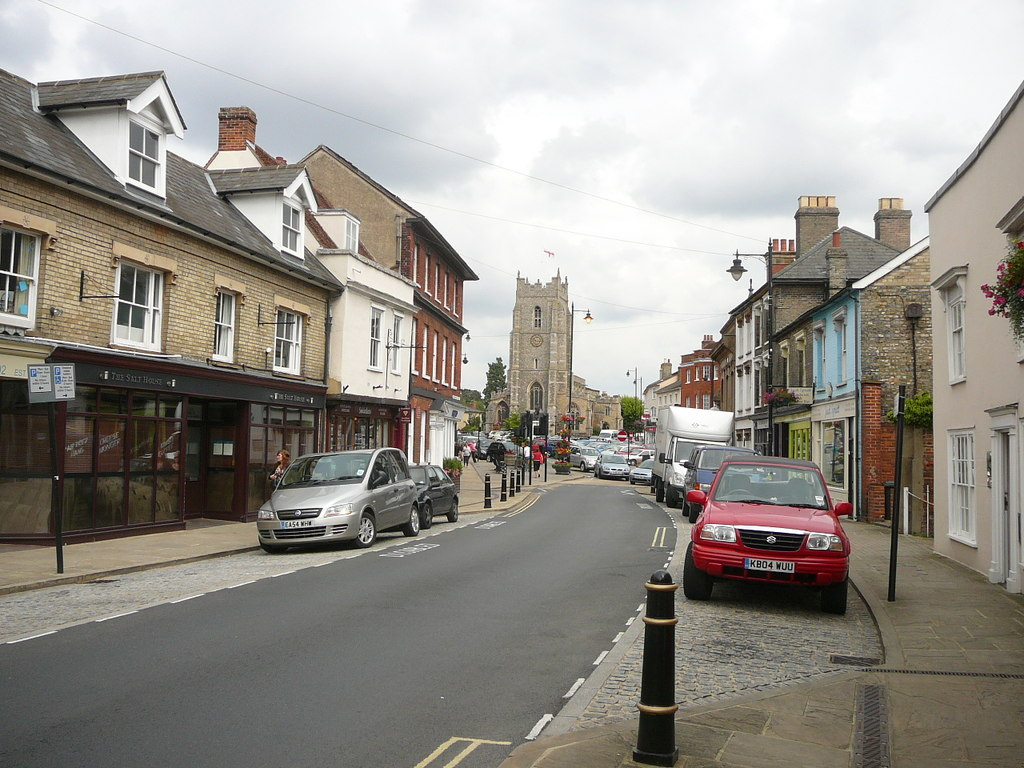
- Sudbury, the district's largest town

- Babergh shown within Suffolk
- Sovereign state: United Kingdom
- Constituent country: England
- Region: East of England
- Non-metropolitan county: Suffolk
- Status: Non-metropolitan district
- Admin HQ: Ipswich
- Incorporated: 1 April 1974

Government
  - Type: Non-metropolitan district council
  - Body: Babergh District Council
  - MPs: James Cartlidge

Area
  - Total: 229.8 sq mi (595.2 km^{2})
  - Rank: 60th (of 296)

Population (Census 2021)
  - Total: 92,300
  - Rank: 255th (of 296)
  - Density: 402/sq mi (155/km^{2})

Ethnicity (2021)
  - Ethnic groups: List: 96.7% White; 1.5% Mixed; 0.9% Asian; 0.5% Black; 0.4% other

Religion (2021)
  - Religion: List: 49.6% Christianity; 42.9% no religion; 7% other; 0.5% Islam
- Time zone: UTC0 (GMT)
  - Summer (DST): UTC+1 (BST)
- ONS code: 42UB (ONS); E07000200 (GSS)
- OS grid reference: TM021429

Babergh District (pronounced /ˈbeɪbə/, BAY-bə) is a local government district in Suffolk, England. In 2021 it had a population of 92,300. The district is primarily a rural area, containing just two towns, Sudbury and Hadleigh. The council was based in Hadleigh until 2017, when it moved to shared offices with neighbouring Mid Suffolk District Council in Ipswich, outside either district. The district is named after the medieval Babergh Hundred, which covered part of the area.

The district includes parts of two designated Areas of Outstanding Natural Beauty, Dedham Vale, known for its association with painter John Constable, and Suffolk Coast and Heaths.

The neighbouring districts are East Suffolk, Ipswich, Mid Suffolk, West Suffolk, Braintree, Colchester and Tendring.

== History ==
The district was created on 1 April 1974 under the Local Government Act 1972, covering five former districts which were all abolished at the same time:

- Cosford Rural District
- Hadleigh Urban District
- Melford Rural District
- Samford Rural District
- Sudbury Municipal Borough

Samford Rural District had been in the administrative county of East Suffolk prior to the reforms; the other districts had all been in West Suffolk.

The new district was named Babergh after the medieval hundred of Babergh, which had covered part of the area. Babergh Hundred is referred to in the Domesday Book of 1086; the modern district covers a larger area than the historic hundred, also covering the hundreds of Cosford and Samford. The council's logo now says "Babergh District Council – South Suffolk".

In March 2026, the government announced plans to abolish the district in 2028 as part of local government reorganisation across Suffolk. These proposals were withdrawn in September 2026.

== Governance ==
Babergh District Council

Type
- Type: Non-metropolitan district

Leadership
- Chair: Lee Parker, Liberal Democrat since 12 May 2026
- Leader: Deborah Saw, Green since 12 May 2026
- Chief Executive: Arthur Charvonia since 2017

Structure
- Seats: 32 councillors
- Political groups: Administration (23) Green (10) Independent (9) Liberal Democrats (4) Other parties (9) Conservative (6) Reform UK (2) Labour (1)

Elections
- Voting system: First past the post
- Last election: 4 May 2023
- Next election: 6 May 2027

Meeting place
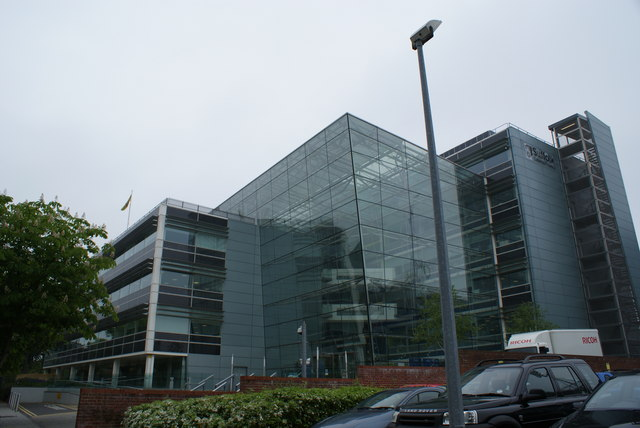
- Endeavour House, 8 Russell Road, Ipswich, IP1 2BX

Website
- www.babergh.gov.uk

Babergh District Council provides district-level services. County-level services are provided by Suffolk County Council. The whole district is also covered by civil parishes, which form a third tier of local government.

In 2011, Babergh and Mid Suffolk District Councils began working together, with one, fully integrated staff structure.

=== Political control ===
The council has been under no overall control since the 2019 election. Following the 2023 election a coalition of the Greens, independents and Liberal Democrats formed to run the council.

The first elections were held in 1973, initially operating as a shadow authority alongside the outgoing authorities until the new arrangements came into effect on 1 April 1974. Political control of the council since 1974 has been as follows:

Party in control	Years
No overall control	1974–2015
Conservative	2015–2019
No overall control	2019–present

=== Leadership ===
Prior to 2014 there was no formal position of leader of the council at Babergh, with political leadership provided instead by the chair of the policy and resources committee, or its successor, the strategy committee. From 2014 onwards, the chair of the strategy committee was also given the title of leader. The council then moved from a committee system to a leader and cabinet model in 2017, giving the leader additional powers to make executive decisions. The leaders (or chairs of policy and resources / strategy committees) since 2005 have been:

Councillor	Party	From	To
Sue Carpendale	Liberal Democrats		Apr 2005
Nick Ridley	Conservative	19 Apr 2005	2011
Jennie Jenkins	Conservative	19 May 2011	19 Dec 2017
John Ward	Conservative	4 Jan 2018	25 Apr 2022
John Ward	Independent	25 Apr 2022	23 May 2023
David Busby	Liberal Democrats	23 May 2023	20 May 2024
Deborah Saw	Green	20 May 2024	14 May 2025
John Ward	Independent	14 May 2025	12 May 2026
Deborah Saw	Green	12 May 2026	

=== Composition ===
Following the 2023 election, the composition of the council was:

Party	Councillors
Green	10
Independent	9
Conservative	7
Liberal Democrats	5
Labour	1
Total	32

The next election is due in 2027.

=== Elections ===
Since the last boundary changes in 2019 the council has comprised 32 councillors representing 24 wards, with each ward electing one, two or three councillors. Elections are held every four years.

=== Premises ===
Since 2017 Babergh and Mid Suffolk councils have their combined headquarters at Endeavour House in Ipswich, sharing the building with Suffolk County Council.

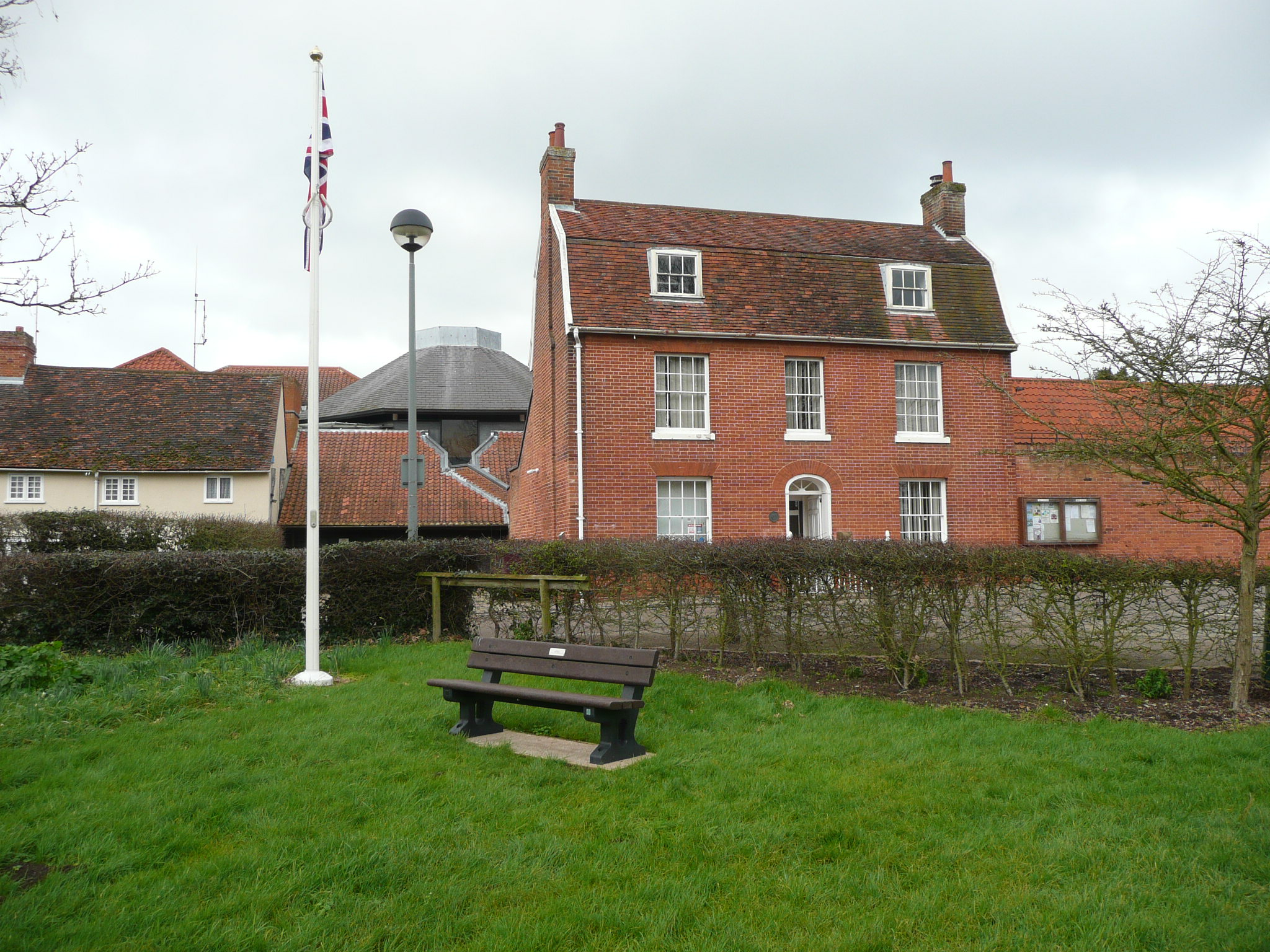
Council Offices, Corks Lane, Hadleigh: Council's headquarters 1982–2017.

When the council was first created it inherited offices in Sudbury, Hadleigh and Ipswich from its predecessor councils. The council initially based itself at the former Cosford Rural District Council's offices at 32 High Street in Hadleigh. The council built itself a new headquarters on Corks Lane in Hadleigh, incorporating existing cottages and granaries into the new building. The new complex was formally opened on 4 June 1982.

== Geography ==
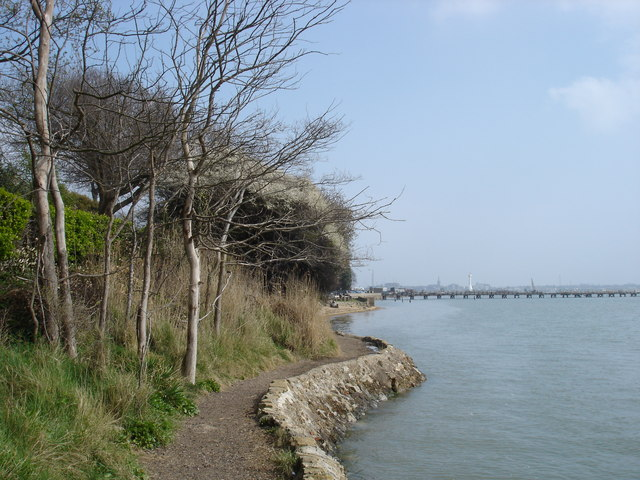
Foreshore at Shotley Gate at the eastern tip of the district.

The southern boundary of the district is marked almost exclusively by the River Stour, which also forms the border with Essex, and it is separated from East Suffolk by the River Orwell. The eastern part of the district forms a peninsula between the two tidal rivers, coming to a point at Shotley Gate.

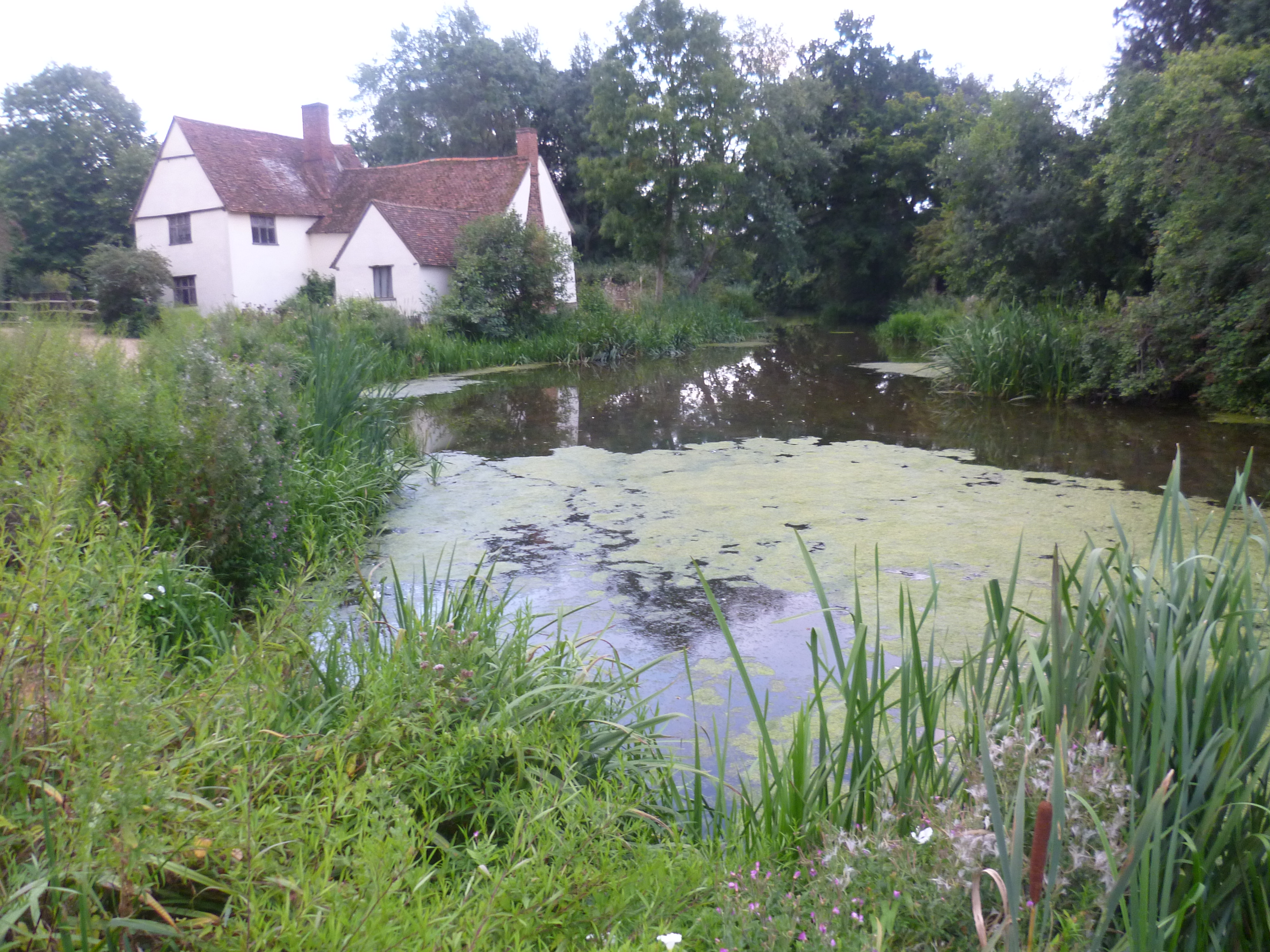
Willy Lott's Cottage at Flatford, noted for being depicted in several paintings by John Constable, including The Hay Wain.

'Constable Country' is cognate with a large tract of Babergh: drawing visitors to the Dedham Vale, a designated Area of Outstanding Natural Beauty, and the well-preserved villages of Long Melford, Lavenham and Kersey. The district also includes part of the built-up area of Ipswich at Pinewood.

== Demography ==
Babergh's population size has increased by 5.2%, from around 87,700 in 2011 to 92,300 in 2021 and covers an area of approximately 230 square miles (600 km^{2}).

== Towns and parishes ==
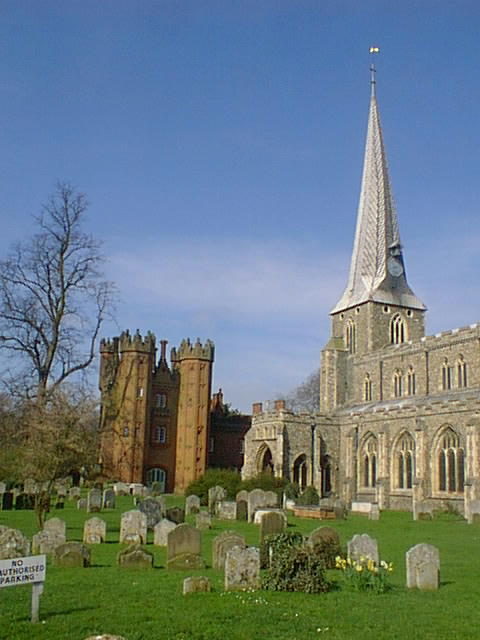
Hadleigh, the district's other town.

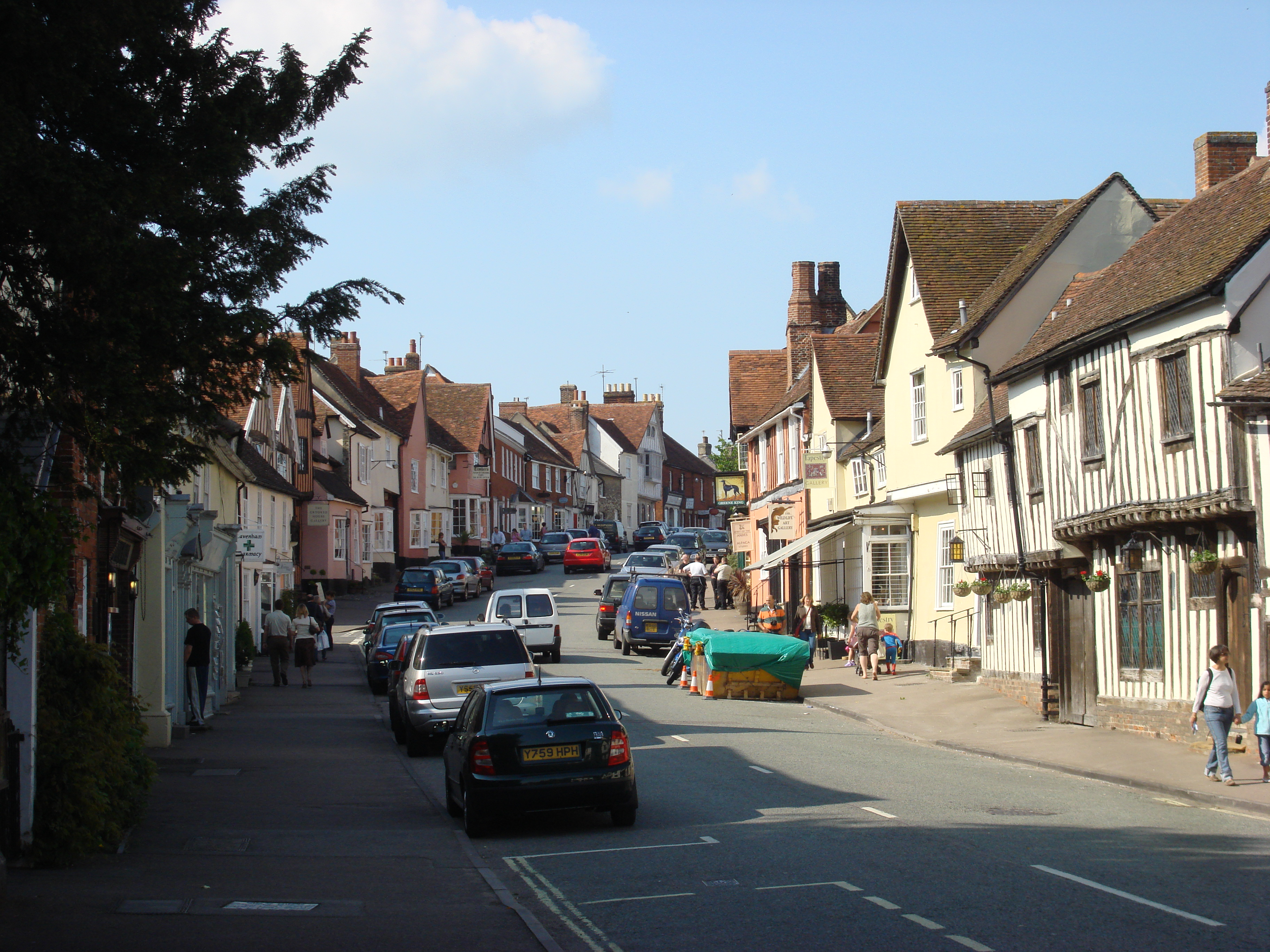
Lavenham, one of the district's many villages.

The whole district is covered by civil parishes. The parish councils for Sudbury and Hadleigh have declared their parishes to be towns, allowing them to take the style "town council". Some of the smaller parishes have a parish meeting rather than a parish council.
