= Ipswich and South Suffolk =

- Proposed unitary authority area
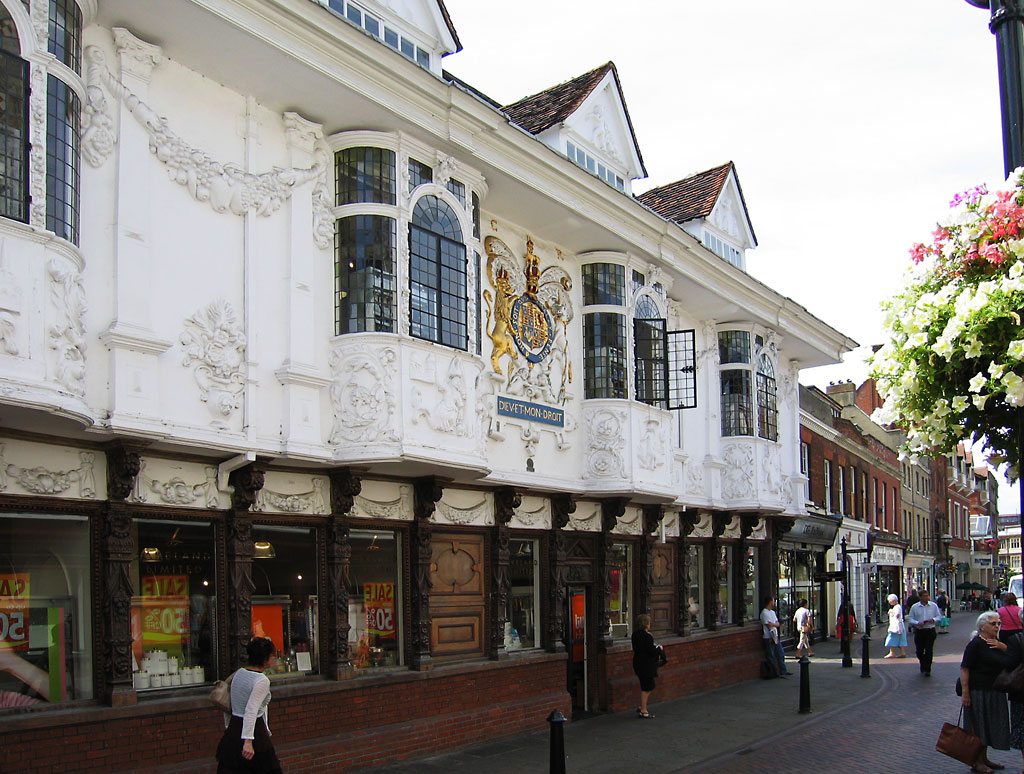
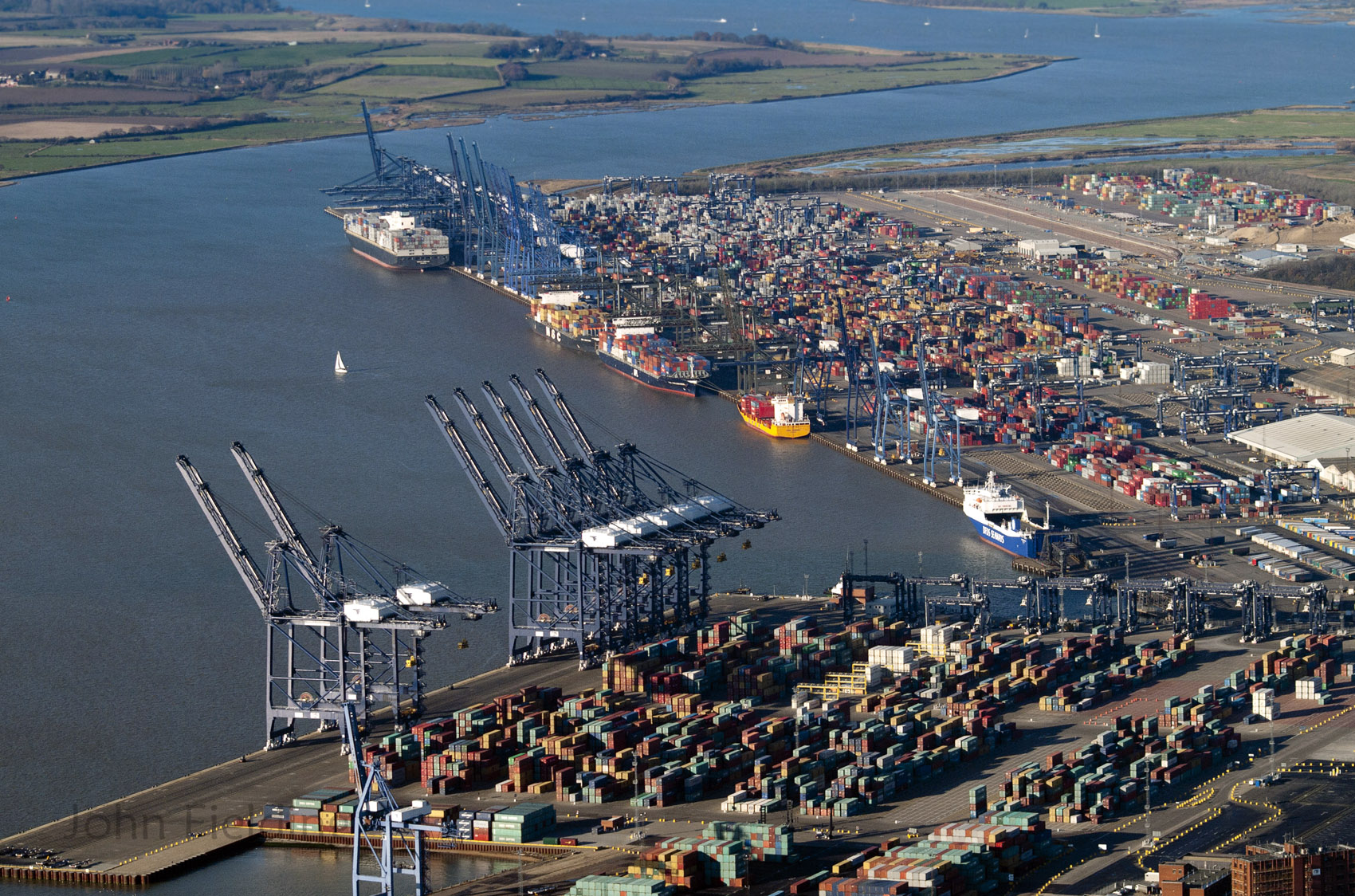
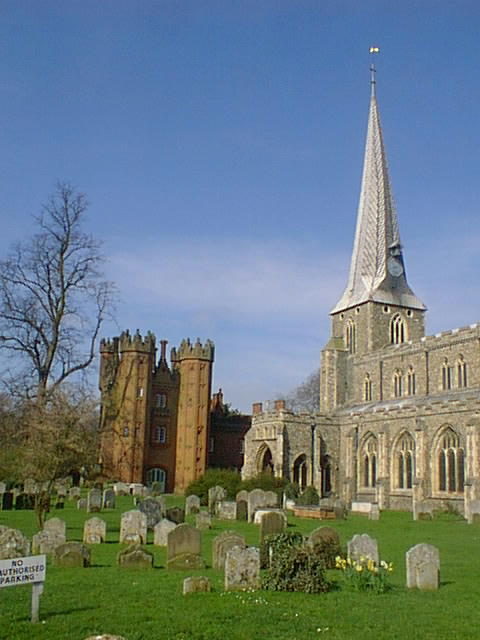
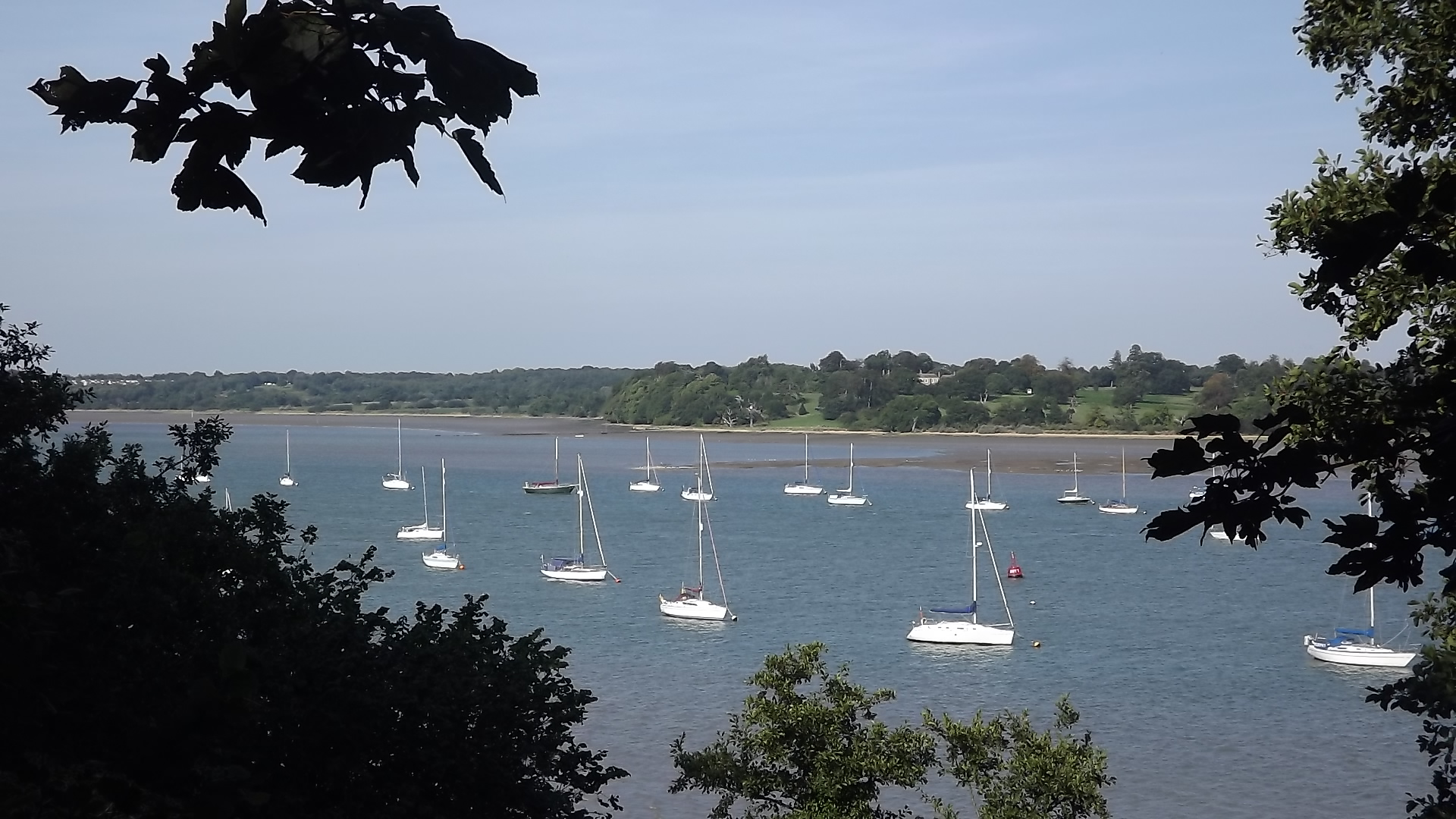
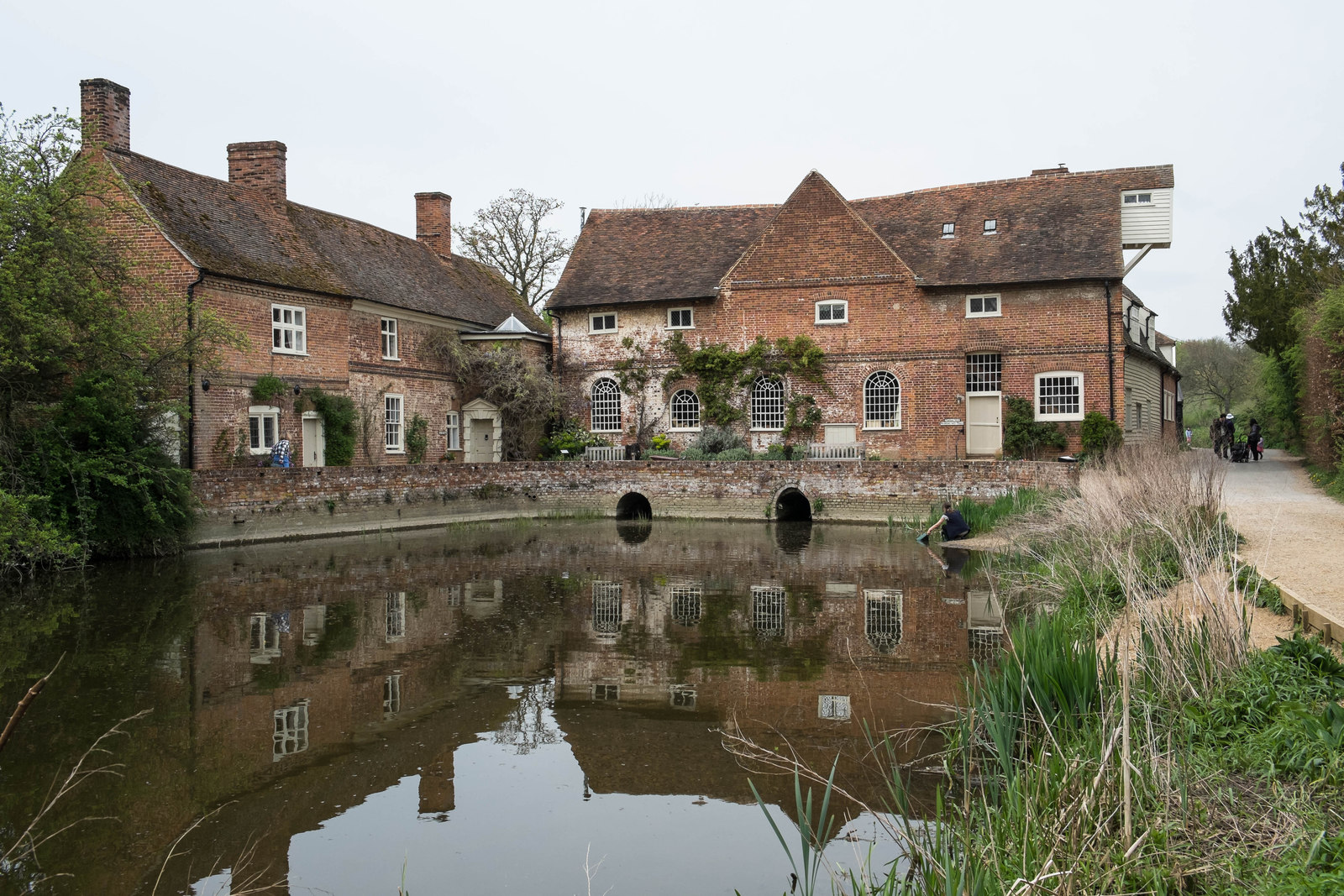
- Clockwise from upper left: Ancient House in Ipswich, Port of Felixstowe, St Mary's Church and Deanery Tower in Hadleigh, Flatford Mill, River Orwell.

- Ipswich and South Suffolk shown within Suffolk
- Interactive map
- Coordinates: 52.0536°N 1.1431°E
- Sovereign state: United Kingdom
- Country: England
- Region: East
- Ceremonial county: Suffolk

Government
  - Type: Unitary authority
  - Body: Ipswich and South Suffolk Council

Area
  - Total: 185.6 sq mi (480.7 km^{2})

Population (2024 estimate)
  - Total: 257,131
- Time zone: UTC+0 (GMT)
  - Summer (DST): UTC+1 (BST)

Ipswich and South Suffolk or Greater Ipswich was a proposed unitary authority area in the ceremonial county of Suffolk, England. It would have been formed from the Ipswich district, 31 parishes from Babergh, 8 parishes from Mid Suffolk and 25 from East Suffolk.

There would have been elections in May 2027 and the new unitary would have been created in 2028. In 2021 the population of the area was 252,552. The largest settlement would have been the county town of Ipswich, other towns include Felixstowe, Kesgrave and Hadleigh.

Despite being part of the Ipswich built-up area in the 2011 census (but not 2001 census) the town of Woodbridge was planned to be in Central and Eastern Suffolk rather than the "Ipswich and South Suffolk" unitary, it has been suggested that this could be because the people of Woodbridge strongly opposed to being linked with Ipswich.

Plans to create it were withdrawn in September 2026.

== Formation ==
In 2008 there was a similar proposal for a "North Haven" unitary authority covering Ipswich and Felixstowe and either a single "Rural Suffolk" or a split of the rest of Suffolk into eastern and western unitaries. In 2007 there was a proposal for Ipswich alone to become a unitary authority. Before 1974 Ipswich was a county borough.

In the mid 2020s a new wave of local government changes throughout England was planned that would lead to all areas of the country that have separate county councils and district councils seeing those replaced with single-tier, or unitary, local governance. The alternative proposal for a single unitary council for all of Suffolk was not chosen.

In September 2026, the Suffolk proposals were withdrawn by the government in light of new legal advice. The decision was threatened with judicial review by Suffolk County Council.

== Parishes and settlements ==
The current district of Ipswich is currently unparished but there are plans to set up a town council, the rest of the area is entirely parished and contains the following civil parishes:

- Akenham, Aldham, Arwarton
- Barham, Belstead, Bentley, Bramford, Brantham, Brightwell, Bucklesham, Burstall
- Capel St Mary, Chattisham, Chelmondiston, Claydon, Copdock and Washbrook
- East Bergholt, Elmsett
- Falkenham, Felixstowe, Flowton, Foxhall, Freston
- Great Bealings, Great Blakenham
- Hadleigh, Harkstead, Hemley, Henley, Higham, Hintlesham, Holbrook, Holton St Mary
- Kesgrave, Kirton
- Layham, Levington, Little Bealings, Little Blakenham
- Martlesham
- Nacton, Newbourne
- Pinewood, Playford, Purdis Farm
- Raydon, Rushmere St Andrew
- Shelley, Shotley, Sproughton, Stratford St. Mary, Stratton Hall, Stutton, Swilland
- Tattingstone, Trimley St Martin, Trimley St Mary, Tuddenham St Martin
- Waldringfield, Wenham Parva, Wenham Magna, Westerfield, Wherstead, Whitton, Witnesham, Woolverstone

== Governance ==
The local authority would have been Ipswich and South Suffolk Council. The first councillors would have been elected in May 2027. This election was cancelled in September 2026.

== See also ==
- Western Suffolk
