= Samford Hundred =

Historical division of Suffolk, England

Coordinates: 52.0°N 1.11°E

Samford was a hundred of Suffolk, consisting of 44,940 acres (181.9 km^{2}). It was situated to the south and south west of Ipswich.

The hundred was bounded by the River Orwell to the east, Essex to the south, the River Brett (and Shelley parish) to the west, and the parish boundaries of Burstall, Hintlesham, and Sproughton to the north.

== Parishes ==
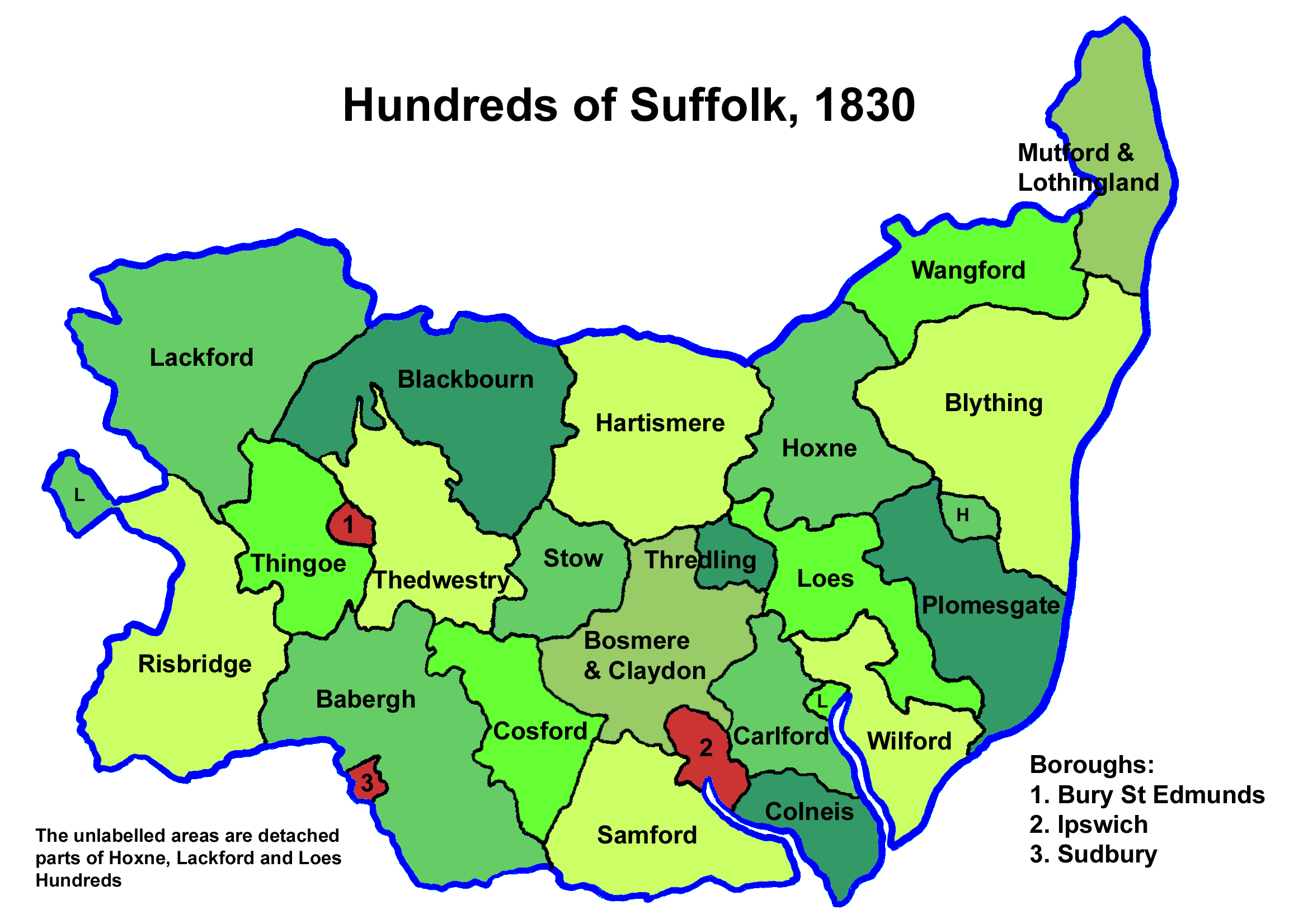
Suffolk hundreds

Samford Deanery, the modern ecclesiastic administrative area, takes its name from Samford Hundred and previously covered the whole of the old Samford Hundred. Seven of the westernmost parishes have been more recently allocated to Hadleigh Deanery. Samford Hundred consisted of the following 28 parishes:

Parish	Area (acres)	Modern Deanery
Belstead	1012	Samford
Bentley	2801	Samford
Brantham	1922	Samford
Burstall	766	Samford
Capel St Mary	1910	Samford
Chattisham	714	Hadleigh
Chelmondiston	1293	Samford
Copdock	932	Samford
East Bergholt	3064	Samford
Erwarton	1318	Samford
Freston	1414	Samford
Great Wenham	1108	Samford
Harkstead	1727	Samford
Higham	863	Hadleigh
Hintlesham	2828	Hadleigh
Holbrook	2203	Samford
Holton St Mary	810	Hadleigh
Little Wenham	970	Samford
Raydon	2335	Hadleigh
Shelley	928	Hadleigh
Shotley	2051	Samford
Sproughton	2380	Samford
Stratford St Mary	1432	Hadleigh
Stutton	2138	Samford
Tattingstone	1637	Samford
Washbrook	1414	Samford
Wherstead	2019	Samford
Woolverstone	951	Samford
