= Listed buildings in Harkstead =

Civil Parish in Suffolk, England

Harkstead is a village and civil parish in the Babergh District of Suffolk, England. It contains eleven listed buildings that are recorded in the National Heritage List for England. Of these one is grade II* and ten are grade II.

This list is based on the information retrieved online from Historic England.

== Key ==
Grade	Criteria
I	Buildings that are of exceptional interest
II*	Particularly important buildings of more than special interest
II	Buildings that are of special interest

== Listing ==
Name	Grade	Location	Type	Completed (Note: The date given is the date used by Historic England as significant for the initial building or that of an important part in the structure's description.)	Date designated	Grid ref. (Note: The grid reference is based on the British national grid reference system, sometimes known as OSGB36, used by the Ordnance Survey.) Geo-coordinates	Notes	Entry number (Note: The "List Entry Number" is a unique number assigned to each listed building and scheduled monument by Historic England.)	Image	Wikidata
Nether Hall	II	IP9 1BX			23 February 1989	TM1913034047; 51°57′42″N 1°11′17″E		1351640	Upload Photo	Q26634723
Barn Approximately 110 Metres North of Beaumont Hall	II	Beaumont Hall Chase			22 February 1955	TM2043233917; 51°57′36″N 1°12′25″E		1351639	Upload Photo	Q26634722
Beaumont Hall	II	Beaumont Hall Chase			22 February 1955	TM2045733823; 51°57′33″N 1°12′26″E		1036907	Upload Photo	Q26288583
Church of St Mary	II*	Fish Pond Hill	church building		22 February 1955	TM1940835280; 51°58′22″N 1°11′35″E		1286085	Church of St Mary More images	Q17534260
Old Hall Cottages	II	1 and 2, Harkstead Road			23 February 1989	TM1939435343; 51°58′24″N 1°11′34″E		1036908	Upload Photo	Q26288584
The Vale Farmhouse	II	Ipswich Road			23 February 1989	TM1898635586; 51°58′32″N 1°11′13″E		1193642	Upload Photo	Q26488289
Harkstead War Memorial	II	Lings Lane, IP9 1DD			16 January 2020	TM1940535246; 51°58′20″N 1°11′34″E		1468319	Upload Photo	Q97450355
Knights Farmhouse	II	Shotley Road			23 February 1989	TM2002834268; 51°57′48″N 1°12′05″E		1193666	Upload Photo	Q26488311
Wall and Railings Attached to Right and Enclosing Front Garden of Knights Farmhouse	II	Shotley Road			23 February 1989	TM2002634280; 51°57′48″N 1°12′05″E		1036909	Upload Photo	Q26288585
The Walnuts	II	Walnut Tree Lane			23 February 1989	TM1875434710; 51°58′04″N 1°10′59″E		1193675	Upload Photo	Q26488321

== See also ==
- Grade I listed buildings in Suffolk
- Grade II* listed buildings in Suffolk

== Sources ==
- Bettely, James; Pevsner, Nikolaus (2015) [1961], Suffolk: West, The Buildings of England, New Haven and London: Yale University Press, ISBN 978-0-300-19655-9
