= Listed buildings in Holbrook, Suffolk =

Historic structures in Suffolk, England

Holbrook is a village and civil parish in the Babergh District of Suffolk, England. It contains 69 listed buildings that are recorded in the National Heritage List for England. Of these three are grade II* and 66 are grade II.

This list is based on the information retrieved online from Historic England.

== Key ==
Grade	Criteria
I	Buildings that are of exceptional interest
II*	Particularly important buildings of more than special interest
II	Buildings that are of special interest

== Listing ==
Name	Grade	Location	Type	Completed (Note: The date given is the date used by Historic England as significant for the initial building or that of an important part in the structure's description.)	Date designated	Grid ref. (Note: The grid reference is based on the British national grid reference system, sometimes known as OSGB36, used by the Ordnance Survey.) Geo-coordinates	Notes	Entry number (Note: The "List Entry Number" is a unique number assigned to each listed building and scheduled monument by Historic England.)	Image	Wikidata
Marsh Gate Seaton	II				23 February 1989	TM1770735132; 51°58′19″N 1°10′05″E		1351662	Upload Photo	Q26634744
Potash Farmhouse	II	B1080			29 July 1987	TM1677337764; 51°59′46″N 1°09′22″E		1351630	Upload Photo	Q26634714
Barn Approximately 50 Metres West of Brook Farmhouse	II	Brook Farm Lane			23 February 1989	TM1631036692; 51°59′12″N 1°08′56″E		1193701	Upload Photo	Q26488346
Brook Farmhouse	II	Brook Farm Lane			23 February 1989	TM1634736680; 51°59′11″N 1°08′58″E		1036910	Upload Photo	Q26288586
Holbrook War Memorial	II	Church Hill, Junction Of Hyams Lane, IP9 2QP	war memorial		1 November 2019	TM1699436115; 51°58′52″N 1°09′30″E		1465082	Holbrook War Memorial More images	Q97362632
Group of 3 Tombs with Wrought and Cast Iron Railings, Approximately 2 to 4 Metres East of East Wall of Chancel, Church of All Saints	II	Approximately 2 To 4 Metres East Of East Wall Of Chancel, Church Of All Saints, Church Road			23 February 1989	TM1706336127; 51°58′52″N 1°09′34″E		1036911	Upload Photo	Q26288587
Church of All Saints	II*	Church Road	church building		22 February 1955	TM1704036128; 51°58′52″N 1°09′33″E		1193727	Church of All Saints More images	Q17533801
Holbrook Mill Mill House	II	Church Road			16 March 1972	TM1697335776; 51°58′41″N 1°09′28″E		1351641	Upload Photo	Q26634724
Browns Farmhouse	II	High Street			23 February 1989	TM1634136969; 51°59′20″N 1°08′58″E		1351642	Upload Photo	Q26634725
Orchard Cottage	II	High Street			23 February 1989	TM1656536839; 51°59′16″N 1°09′09″E		1286001	Upload Photo	Q26574645
Hyams House	II	Hyams Lane			4 February 1988	TM1657536169; 51°58′54″N 1°09′08″E		1193798	Upload Photo	Q26488444
1 and 2 Hither House	II	1 and 2 Hither House, Ipswich Road			23 February 1989	TM1703736922; 51°59′18″N 1°09′34″E		1351661	Upload Photo	Q26634743
Former Sunday School at Pettwood	II	Ipswich Road			15 October 2001	TM1684936712; 51°59′11″N 1°09′24″E		1389572	Upload Photo	Q26669006
Pettwood (formerly the Old Rectory)	II	Ipswich Road			15 October 2001	TM1687536693; 51°59′11″N 1°09′25″E		1389571	Upload Photo	Q26669005
The Beeches	II	Ipswich Road			22 February 1955	TM1699536579; 51°59′07″N 1°09′31″E		1036869	Upload Photo	Q26288546
Auld Reekie	II	Lower Holbrook			23 February 1989	TM1799434964; 51°58′13″N 1°10′20″E		1036870	Upload Photo	Q26288547
Royal Hospital School, Main Range Including Assembly Hall, Dining Room, Gymnasium, Administration and Teaching Accommodation	II*	Main Range Including Assembly Hall, Dining Room, Gymnasium, Administration And Teaching Accommodation, Stutton Road			16 January 1981	TM1654335227; 51°58′24″N 1°09′05″E		1036871	Upload Photo	Q17533182
East House, Royal Hospital School	II	Royal Hospital School, Stutton Road			23 February 1989	TM1679135216; 51°58′23″N 1°09′18″E		1194015	Upload Photo	Q26488652
Group of 2 Stone Benches to West of Portico of Nelson House, Royal Hospital School	II	Royal Hospital School, Stutton Road			23 February 1989	TM1688335156; 51°58′21″N 1°09′22″E		1036875	Upload Photo	Q26288550
Nelson House, Royal Hospital School	II	Royal Hospital School, Stutton Road			23 February 1989	TM1689435166; 51°58′21″N 1°09′23″E		1036874	Upload Photo	Q26288549
Raleigh House	II	Royal Hospital School, IP9 2RX			23 February 1989	TM1635235074; 51°58′19″N 1°08′54″E		1036876	Upload Photo	Q26288551
Superintendent's House, Royal Hospital School	II	Royal Hospital School, Stutton Road			23 February 1989	TM1687535439; 51°58′30″N 1°09′22″E		1036881	Upload Photo	Q26288556
West House, Royal Hospital School	II	Royal Hospital School, Stutton Road			23 February 1989	TM1632935101; 51°58′20″N 1°08′53″E		1351665	Upload Photo	Q26634747
Parade Ground Terrace, Steps, 2 Benches and Saluting Base Immediately South of the Main Range of the Royal Hospital School	II	Steps, 2 Benches And Saluting Base Immediately South Of The Main Range Of The Royal Hospital School, Stutton Road			23 February 1989	TM1655935163; 51°58′22″N 1°09′05″E		1036872	Upload Photo	Q26288548
Royal Hospital School and Attached Walls to Right and Left	II	1, Stutton Road			23 February 1989	TM1656235403; 51°58′30″N 1°09′06″E		1036882	Upload Photo	Q26288558
Royal Hospital School and Attached Walls to Right and Left	II	2-5, Stutton Road			23 February 1989	TM1654135401; 51°58′30″N 1°09′05″E		1285889	Upload Photo	Q26683455
Royal Hospital School and Attached Walls to Right and Left	II	6-11, Stutton Road			23 February 1989	TM1649835408; 51°58′30″N 1°09′03″E		1351666	Upload Photo	Q26893605
Royal Hospital School and Attached Walls to Right	II	12-15, Stutton Road			23 February 1989	TM1646435382; 51°58′29″N 1°09′01″E		1194090	Upload Photo	Q26488722
Royal Hospital School and Walls Attached to Right and Left	II	16-19, Stutton Road			23 February 1989	TM1646035326; 51°58′27″N 1°09′01″E		1036883	Upload Photo	Q26288559
Royal Hospital School and Walls Attached to Right and Left	II	20 and 21, Stutton Road			23 February 1989	TM1642835286; 51°58′26″N 1°08′59″E		1194121	Upload Photo	Q26488751
Royal Hospital School	II	22 and 23, Stutton Road			23 February 1989	TM1640035265; 51°58′25″N 1°08′57″E		1351667	Upload Photo	Q26685437
Royal Hospital School	II	24 and 25, Stutton Road			23 February 1989	TM1637235244; 51°58′25″N 1°08′56″E		1194161	Upload Photo	Q26488792
Royal Hospital School	II	26 and 27, Stutton Road			23 February 1989	TM1634435222; 51°58′24″N 1°08′54″E		1036884	Upload Photo	Q26288560
Royal Hospital School	II	28, Stutton Road			23 February 1989	TM1632135205; 51°58′23″N 1°08′53″E		1036885	Upload Photo	Q26288561
Royal Hospital School	II	31 and 32, Stutton Road			23 February 1989	TM1626535147; 51°58′22″N 1°08′50″E		1194195	Upload Photo	Q26488826
Royal Hospital School	II	33 and 34, Stutton Road			23 February 1989	TM1624135120; 51°58′21″N 1°08′49″E		1351668	Upload Photo	Q26893606
Royal Hospital School	II	35 and 36, Stutton Road			23 February 1989	TM1621835093; 51°58′20″N 1°08′47″E		1194212	Upload Photo	Q26488843
Royal Hospital School	II	37 and 38, Stutton Road			23 February 1989	TM1619435067; 51°58′19″N 1°08′46″E		1036886	Upload Photo	Q26288562
Royal Hospital School	II	39, Stutton Road			23 February 1989	TM1621435039; 51°58′18″N 1°08′47″E		1194257	Upload Photo	Q26488885
Royal Hospital School	II	40, Stutton Road			23 February 1989	TM1623735066; 51°58′19″N 1°08′48″E		1351669	Upload Photo	Q26893608
Royal Hospital School	II	41, Stutton Road			23 February 1989	TM1629335129; 51°58′21″N 1°08′51″E		1194286	Upload Photo	Q26488913
Royal Hospital School	II	42, Stutton Road			23 February 1989	TM1632335162; 51°58′22″N 1°08′53″E		1036887	Upload Photo	Q26288563
Royal Hospital School	II	43, Stutton Road			23 February 1989	TM1639135214; 51°58′24″N 1°08′57″E		1194297	Upload Photo	Q26488924
Royal Hospital School	II	44, Stutton Road			23 February 1989	TM1642335241; 51°58′25″N 1°08′58″E		1036888	Upload Photo	Q26288564
Royal Hospital School and Attached Wall and Garage to Left	II	45, Stutton Road			23 February 1989	TM1648635281; 51°58′26″N 1°09′02″E		1194323	Upload Photo	Q26488949
Royal Hospital School and Attached Wall and Garage to Right	II	46, Stutton Road			23 February 1989	TM1656835300; 51°58′26″N 1°09′06″E		1351670	Upload Photo	Q26634752
Royal Hospital School	II	47, Stutton Road			23 February 1989	TM1664835292; 51°58′26″N 1°09′10″E		1194346	Upload Photo	Q26488973
Royal Hospital School	II	48, Stutton Road			23 February 1989	TM1668735284; 51°58′26″N 1°09′12″E		1036889	Upload Photo	Q26288565
Royal Hospital School	II	49 and 50, Stutton Road			23 February 1989	TM1664535322; 51°58′27″N 1°09′10″E		1351671	Upload Photo	Q66477543
Royal Hospital School	II	51 and 52, Stutton Road			23 February 1989	TM1661135330; 51°58′27″N 1°09′08″E		1194372	Upload Photo	Q26488998
Royal Hospital School and Attached Walls to Right and Left	II	53-56, Stutton Road			23 February 1989	TM1657335353; 51°58′28″N 1°09′06″E		1036847	Upload Photo	Q26288524
Royal Hospital School and Attached Walls to Right and Left	II	57, Stutton Road			23 February 1989	TM1658635377; 51°58′29″N 1°09′07″E		1036848	Upload Photo	Q26288525
Anson	II	Stutton Road			23 February 1989	TM1675635174; 51°58′22″N 1°09′16″E		1193986	Upload Photo	Q26488625
Blake	II	Stutton Road			23 February 1989	TM1634134981; 51°58′16″N 1°08′53″E		1036877	Upload Photo	Q26288552
Chapel of the Royal Hospital School	II*	Stutton Road	school chapel		23 February 1989	TM1672635223; 51°58′24″N 1°09′14″E		1036873	Chapel of the Royal Hospital School More images	Q98825690
Collingwood	II	Stutton Road			23 February 1989	TM1669535160; 51°58′22″N 1°09′12″E		1036878	Upload Photo	Q26288553
Cornwallis	II	Stutton Road			23 February 1989	TM1671435079; 51°58′19″N 1°09′13″E		1036880	Upload Photo	Q26288555
Drake	II	Stutton Road			23 February 1989	TM1629335061; 51°58′19″N 1°08′51″E		1285951	Upload Photo	Q26574600
Group of 4 Benches Situated 2 to North and South Faces of the Chapel of Royal Hospital School	II	Stutton Road			23 February 1989	TM1673535237; 51°58′24″N 1°09′15″E		1351664	Upload Photo	Q26634746
Group of 8 Benches Situated on the Terrace to South of the Main Block of the Royal Hospital School	II	Stutton Road			23 February 1989	TM1654935170; 51°58′22″N 1°09′05″E		1351663	Upload Photo	Q26634745
Hawke	II	Stutton Road			23 February 1989	TM1681635188; 51°58′22″N 1°09′19″E		1036879	Upload Photo	Q26288554
Hood	II	Stutton Road			23 February 1989	TM1683535109; 51°58′20″N 1°09′20″E		1285903	Upload Photo	Q26574560
Howe	II	Stutton Road			23 February 1989	TM1643335008; 51°58′17″N 1°08′58″E		1285929	Upload Photo	Q26574581
Infirmary at Royal Hospital School	II	Stutton Road			23 February 1989	TM1687635312; 51°58′26″N 1°09′22″E		1285879	Upload Photo	Q26574536
K6 Telephone Kiosk	II	Stutton Road			23 February 1989	TM1629935172; 51°58′22″N 1°08′52″E		1351691	Upload Photo	Q26634773
St Vincent	II	Stutton Road			23 February 1989	TM1641335092; 51°58′20″N 1°08′58″E		1285922	Upload Photo	Q26574575
Walled Garden at Holbrook House	II	The Royal Hospital School, Ipswich, IP9 2RU			20 February 2024	TM1682735491; 51°58′32″N 1°09′20″E		1488516	Upload Photo	Q124629986
Cherry Ground	II	Woodlands Lane			23 February 1989	TM1648637316; 51°59′31″N 1°09′06″E		1351653	Upload Photo	Q26634735
Woodlands Farmhouse	II	Woodlands Lane			23 February 1989	TM1607237304; 51°59′32″N 1°08′45″E		1036849	Upload Photo	Q26288527

== See also ==
- Grade I listed buildings in Suffolk
- Grade II* listed buildings in Suffolk

== Sources ==
- Bettely, James; Pevsner, Nikolaus (2015) [1961], Suffolk: West, The Buildings of England, New Haven and London: Yale University Press, ISBN 978-0-300-19655-9
