= Holbrook High School =

Holbrook High School may refer to one of the following:

- Holbrook High School (England), Ipswich, Suffolk
- Holbrook High School (Arizona), Holbrook, Arizona
