= Arthur Lucas (disambiguation) =

Arthur Lucas (died 1962) was one of the two last people to be executed in Canada.

Arthur Lucas may also refer to:

- Arthur Lucas (educationist) (born 1941), Australian academic and Principal of King's College London
- Sir Arthur Lucas, 2nd Baronet (1853–1915), English cricketer
- Arthur Henry Shakespeare Lucas (1853–1936), English-born Australian schoolmaster and scientist
