= Listed buildings in Wherstead =

Civil Parish in Suffolk, England

Wherstead is a village and civil parish in the Babergh District of Suffolk, England. It contains 22 listed buildings that are recorded in the National Heritage List for England. Of these one is grade II* and 21 are grade II.

This list is based on the information retrieved online from Historic England.

== Key ==
| Grade | Criteria |
|---|---|
| I | Buildings that are of exceptional interest |
| II* | Particularly important buildings of more than special interest |
| II | Buildings that are of special interest |

== Listing ==
| Name | Grade | Location | Type | Completed (Note: The date given is the date used by Historic England as significant for the initial building or that of an important part in the structure's description.) | Date designated | Grid ref. (Note: The grid reference is based on the British national grid reference system, sometimes known as OSGB36, used by the Ordnance Survey.) Geo-coordinates | Notes | Entry number (Note: The "List Entry Number" is a unique number assigned to each listed building and scheduled monument by Historic England.) | Image | Wikidata |
|---|---|---|---|---|---|---|---|---|---|---|
| Bluegates Farmhouse | II | A137 | | | 29 July 1987 | TM1462239807; 52°00′55″N 1°07′34″E | | 1203987 | Upload Photo | Q26499485 |
| Pannington Hall | II | A137 | | | 29 July 1987 | TM1448240369; 52°01′13″N 1°07′28″E | | 1281450 | Upload Photo | Q26570502 |
| Rose Cottage | II | A137 | | | 29 July 1987 | TM1520940262; 52°01′08″N 1°08′06″E | | 1036976 | Upload Photo | Q26288653 |
| Barn Approximately 20 Metres to South of Thorington Hall | II | Belstead Lane | | | 29 July 1987 | TM1432241020; 52°01′34″N 1°07′21″E | | 1036934 | Upload Photo | Q26288608 |
| Cottage to West of Thorington Hall | II | Belstead Lane | | | 29 July 1987 | TM1437241056; 52°01′35″N 1°07′24″E | | 1203989 | Upload Photo | Q26499487 |
| Thorington Hall | II | Belstead Lane | | | 29 July 1987 | TM1436541038; 52°01′35″N 1°07′24″E | | 1351652 | Upload Photo | Q26634734 |
| Nos 1 and 2 Bourn Hall | II | Bourn Hill, Bourne Hill | | | 22 February 1955 | TM1611941554; 52°01′49″N 1°08′57″E | | 1036935 | Upload Photo | Q26288609 |
| Ostrich Inn | II | Bourn Hill, Bourne Hill | inn | | 22 February 1955 | TM1617441873; 52°01′59″N 1°09′00″E | | 1203993 | Ostrich Inn More images | Q26499490 |
| Barn to Redgate Farm | II | Redgate Lane | | | 29 July 1987 | TM1697340521; 52°01′14″N 1°09′39″E | | 1204001 | Upload Photo | Q26499497 |
| Redgate Farmhouse | II | Redgate Lane | | | 6 December 1985 | TM1696040556; 52°01′16″N 1°09′39″E | | 1351614 | Upload Photo | Q26634700 |
| Wherstead Hall | II | Redgate Lane | house | | 29 July 1987 | TM1661440786; 52°01′23″N 1°09′21″E | | 1281415 | Wherstead Hall More images | Q26570467 |
| Corner Cottage | II | 1 and 2, The Street | | | 1 March 1972 | TM1570840642; 52°01′20″N 1°08′33″E | | 1036936 | Upload Photo | Q26288610 |
| School House | II | 1 and 2, The Street | | | 29 July 1987 | TM1551540666; 52°01′21″N 1°08′23″E | | 1351615 | Upload Photo | Q26634701 |
| Birch Tree Cottage | II | The Street | | | 1 March 1972 | TM1566440655; 52°01′21″N 1°08′31″E | | 1204015 | Upload Photo | Q26499509 |
| Blacksmiths Cottage | II | The Street | | | 22 February 1955 | TM1544840659; 52°01′21″N 1°08′20″E | | 1204008 | Upload Photo | Q26499502 |
| Garden Cottage | II | The Street | | | 1 March 1972 | TM1571240673; 52°01′21″N 1°08′33″E | | 1351616 | Upload Photo | Q26634702 |
| Park Farmhouse | II | The Street | | | 22 February 1955 | TM1566840541; 52°01′17″N 1°08′31″E | | 1204022 | Upload Photo | Q26499515 |
| Valley Farmhouse | II | Valley Lane | | | 29 July 1987 | TM1537339316; 52°00′38″N 1°08′13″E | | 1036937 | Upload Photo | Q26288611 |
| Church of St Mary | II* | Wherstead Park | church building | | 22 February 1955 | TM1614140699; 52°01′21″N 1°08′56″E | | 1204027 | Church of St Mary More images | Q17534060 |
| Stable Block of Wherstead Park | II | Wherstead Park | | | 22 February 1955 | TM1574040693; 52°01′22″N 1°08′35″E | | 1036939 | Upload Photo | Q26288613 |
| Tombchest Approximately 15 Metres North West of Church of St Mary | II | Wherstead Park | building | | 29 July 1987 | TM1611640703; 52°01′21″N 1°08′55″E | | 1036938 | Tombchest Approximately 15 Metres North West of Church of St Mary More images | Q26288612 |
| Wherstead Park | II | Wherstead Park | English country house | | 22 February 1955 | TM1588340692; 52°01′21″N 1°08′42″E | | 1281392 | Wherstead Park More images | Q26570444 |

== See also ==
- Grade I listed buildings in Suffolk
- Grade II* listed buildings in Suffolk

== Sources ==
- Bettely, James; Pevsner, Nikolaus (2015) [1961], Suffolk: West, The Buildings of England, New Haven and London: Yale University Press, ISBN 978-0-300-19655-9
