= Pin Mill =

Hamlet in Suffolk, England

Coordinates: 51.996131°N 1.212728°E

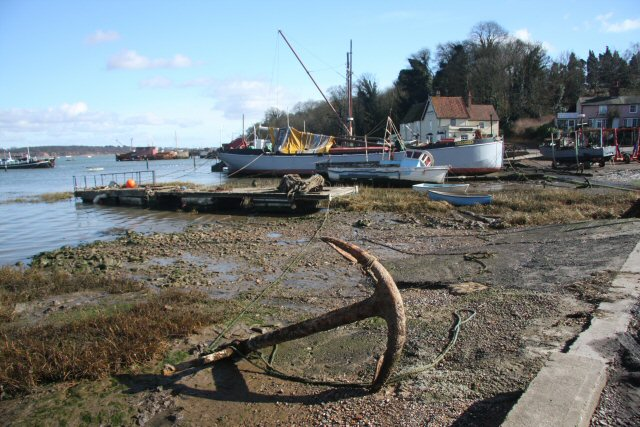
- The shoreline at Pin Mill, Chelmondiston

- Location within Suffolk
- OS grid reference: TM2052537997
- Civil parish: Chelmondiston
- District: Babergh
- Shire county: Suffolk
- Region: East
- Country: England
- Sovereign state: United Kingdom
- Post town: Ipswich
- Postcode district: IP9
- Dialling code: 01473
- Police: Suffolk
- Fire: Suffolk
- Ambulance: East of England

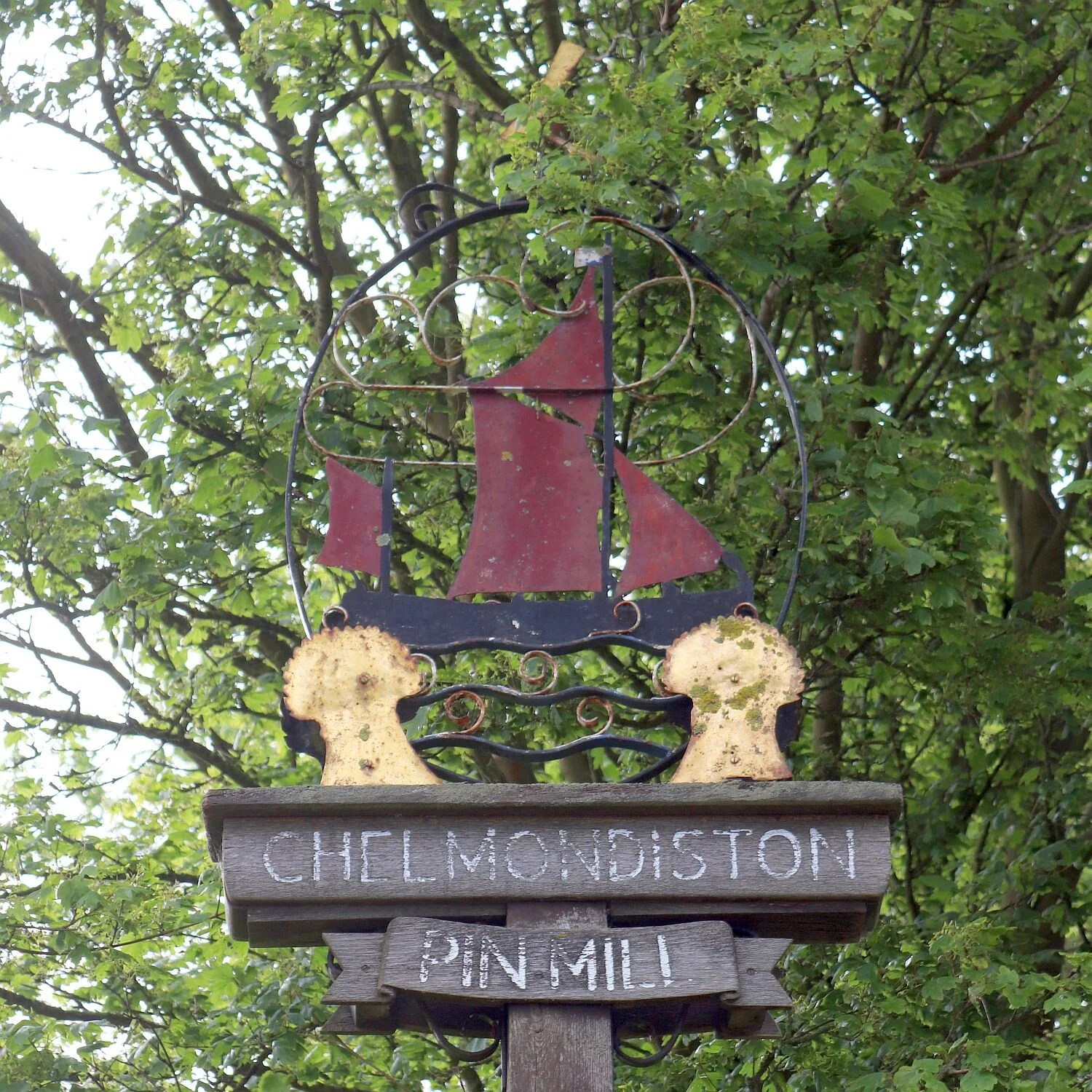
Chelmondiston and Pin Mill Village Sign

Pin Mill is a hamlet on the south bank of the tidal River Orwell, in the civil parish of Chelmondiston, on the Shotley Peninsula, in the Babergh district, in southern Suffolk, England. It lies within the Suffolk Coast and Heaths Area of Outstanding Natural Beauty and is a designated Conservation Area. It is now generally known for the historic Butt and Oyster public house, and for sailing.

== History ==
The expression "pin mill" means a pin factory, and also a word for a wheel with projecting pins used in leather production. Neither of these activities are known to have taken place at Pin Mill.

Pin Mill was once a busy landing point for ship-borne cargo, a centre for the repair of Thames sailing barges and home to many small industries such as sail making, a maltings (now a workshop) and a brickyard. The east coast has a long history of smuggling, in which Pin Mill and the Butt and Oyster pub allegedly played key parts.

During World War II Pin Mill was home to Royal Navy Motor Launches and to a degaussing vessel created from a herring drifter. Pin Mill and Woolverstone were home ports to many tank landing craft used in the invasion of Normandy in 1944.

There were later improvements in the sailing infrastructure, and responsibility for the Hard at Pin Mill was handed over to a new 'community interest' company.

== Leisure activities and places of interest ==
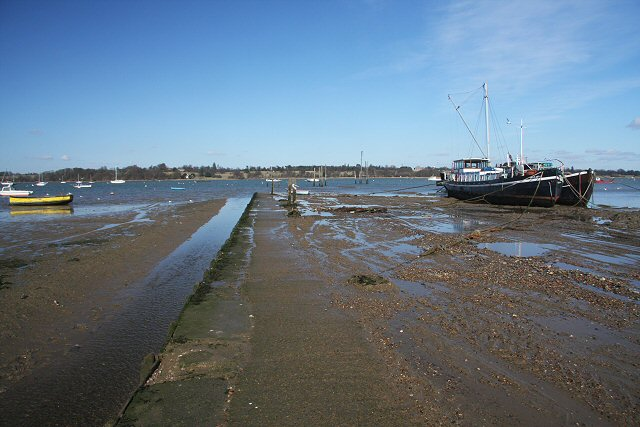
Pin Mill Hard and the Grindle stream

Pin Mill has often been the subject of painting and photography, and is a popular yacht and dinghy sailing destination. During WWII many yachts were placed for storage west of the hamlet in what were then called 'the saltings,' awaiting the cessation of hostilities. The moorings in the river were home to the Royal Harwich One Design Class boats for many years in the 1940s. There are two boatyards, and the Pin Mill Sailing Club has hosted an annual Barge Match since 1962. The Grindle is a small stream that flows alongside Pin Mill Common down to the Pin Mill Hard on the foreshore. It is used by dinghies to ferry sailors ashore.

The Butt and Oyster is a traditional 17th-century public house that serves real ale. It is a listed building with bay windows in the bar and restaurant that offer panoramic views of the Orwell estuary.

Pin Mill lies along the Stour and Orwell walk. There many signposted walks in the immediate area, including through the Cliff Plantation forest owned by the National Trust.

== In popular culture ==
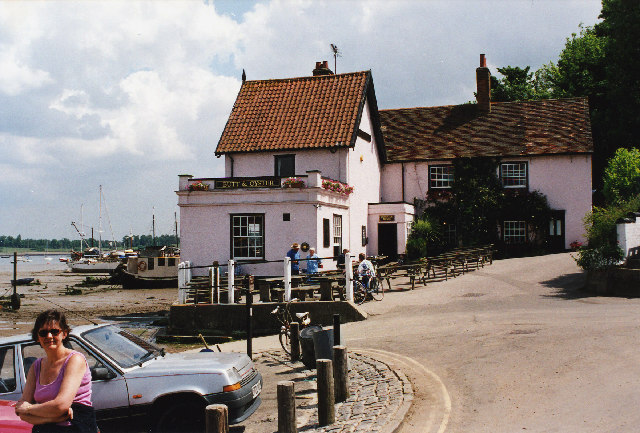
Butt and Oyster Inn, 2001

- The 1933 novel Ordinary Families by E. Arnot Robertson is the story of a young girl growing up with her family in Pin Mill.
- In Arthur Ransome's 1937 novel for children We Didn't Mean to Go to Sea, the young adventurers stay at the real-life Alma Cottage, situated just by the Butt and Oyster pub. Pin Mill also features in Ransome's next book, Secret Water. Ransome had his own boats built at Harry King's boatyard in Pin Mill and had kept his yacht Selina King at the Pin Mill anchorage in 1937–39, although he himself lived for some time at Levington on the opposite side of the Orwell. In 1911 he had declined an offer to go sailing with the bibliographer Walter Ledger, as he was told by Oscar Wilde's friend Robbie Ross that Ledger had episodes of homicidal mania. Later though he said he "always regretted that I did not sail with him, for he kept his Blue Bird at Pin Mill, and, if I had gone, I should have known that charming anchorage twenty years earlier".
- The film Ha'penny Breeze was made in Pin Mill in 1950, featuring a yacht that was based in the area.
- The Butt and Oyster pub was used as a filming location in an episode of the British TV series Lovejoy in 1993.
- Pin Mill is a setting in the Strong Winds series of children's books by Julia Jones.
