= Frederick Fryer (cricketer) =

English first-class cricketer (1849–1917)

Personal information
- Full name: Frederick Eustace Reade Fryer
- Born: 7 January 1849; Holbrook, Suffolk, England
- Died: 1 October 1917 (aged 68); Poplar, Middlesex, England
- Batting: Right-handed
- Bowling: Right-arm medium
- Relatives: Arthur Lucas (brother-in-law)

Domestic team information
- Years: Team
- 1870–1873: Cambridge University

Career statistics
| Competition | First-class |
|---|---|
| Matches | 58 |
| Runs scored | 2,149 |
| Batting average | 21.92 |
| 100s/50s | –/12 |
| Top score | 91 |
| Balls bowled | 2,290 |
| Wickets | 39 |
| Bowling average | 29.00 |
| 5 wickets in innings | 2 |
| 10 wickets in match | – |
| Best bowling | 5/49 |
| Catches/stumpings | 31/- |
- Source: Cricinfo, 24 December 2018

Frederick Eustace Reade Fryer (7 January 1849 – 1 October 1917) was an English first-class cricketer.

== Life and cricket ==
The son of Colonel Frederick Daniel Fryer, he was born at Holbrook House in Holbrook, Suffolk. He was educated at Harrow School, before going up to Caius College, Cambridge in 1869. He later migrated to Downing College, Cambridge in 1872. His debut in first-class cricket came for the Gentlemen of the South against the Players of the South at The Oval in 1869. The following year he debuted for Cambridge University at Fenner's against the Marylebone Cricket Club. He would play for Cambridge in 23 first-class matches to 1873, at a time when university cricket was particularly strong with the likes of William Yardley and Cuthbert Ottaway. He captained Cambridge in 1873, as well as receiving his cricket blue in 1870, 1871, 1872, and 1873. He remained an avid cricketer following his graduation from Cambridge, playing in first-class cricket for several teams until 1883, including the South, Gentlemen of Marylebone Cricket Club, Gentlemen, England XI, Gentlemen of England, Oxford and Cambridge Universities Past and Present, and the Orleans Club. His playing style was described by Wisden Cricketers' Almanack as:

"Upright, easy and graceful, Fryer was a beautiful bat to watch—as attractive to look at as Lionel Palairet in our own time."

Across 58 first-class appearances, Fryer scored 2,149 runs at an average of 21.92. A strong leg side player, Fryer made twelve first-class half centuries, four of which came at Fenner's and three at The Oval. He never managed to make a century, with his highest score being 91. A competent medium pace bowler, Fryer took 39 wickets at a bowling average of 29.00, twice taking a five wicket haul.

== Personal life ==
He succeeded his father as a justice of the peace for Suffolk in 1875. Fryer married Mary Alice Lucas in February 1885, the sister of the baronet and first-class cricketer Arthur Lucas, with the couple having three daughters Later in life he took up golf, becoming a skilled player. He died at Poplar in October 1917.
