= Listed buildings in Chelmondiston =

Civil Parish in Suffolk, England

Chelmondiston is a village and civil parish in the Babergh District of Suffolk, England. It contains seven grade II listed buildings that are recorded in the National Heritage List for England.

This list is based on the information retrieved online from Historic England.

== Key ==
Grade	Criteria
I	Buildings that are of exceptional interest
II*	Particularly important buildings of more than special interest
II	Buildings that are of special interest

== Listing ==
Name	Grade	Location	Type	Completed (Note: The date given is the date used by Historic England as significant for the initial building or that of an important part in the structure's description.)	Date designated	Grid ref. (Note: The grid reference is based on the British national grid reference system, sometimes known as OSGB36, used by the Ordnance Survey.) Geo-coordinates	Notes	Entry number (Note: The "List Entry Number" is a unique number assigned to each listed building and scheduled monument by Historic England.)	Image	Wikidata
Barn Approximately 50 Metres East of Hill Farmhouse	II	Hollow Lane			23 February 1989	TM2079737424; 51°59′29″N 1°12′52″E		1036901	Upload Photo	Q26288577
Cartlodge/granary Approximately 30 Metres East of Hill Farmhouse	II	Hollow Lane			23 February 1989	TM2077737400; 51°59′28″N 1°12′51″E		1036900	Upload Photo	Q26288576
Hill Farm House	II	Hollow Lane			23 February 1989	TM2074937425; 51°59′29″N 1°12′50″E		1036899	Upload Photo	Q26288575
Chelmondiston War Memorial	II	Main Road, IP9 1DX	war memorial		15 January 2020	TM2036137175; 51°59′21″N 1°12′29″E		1467909	Chelmondiston War Memorial More images	Q97449667
Mill House	II	Mill Lane			23 February 1989	TM1999637334; 51°59′27″N 1°12′10″E		1036902	Upload Photo	Q26288578
The Butt and Oyster Public House	II	Pin Mill	pub		23 February 1989	TM2064137981; 51°59′47″N 1°12′45″E		1036903	The Butt and Oyster Public House More images	Q24553434
6 and 7, Richardsons Lane	II	6 and 7, Richardsons Lane			23 February 1989	TM1987137728; 51°59′40″N 1°12′05″E		1036904	Upload Photo	Q26288580

== See also ==
- Grade I listed buildings in Suffolk
- Grade II* listed buildings in Suffolk

== Sources ==
- Bettely, James; Pevsner, Nikolaus (2015) [1961], Suffolk: West, The Buildings of England, New Haven and London: Yale University Press, ISBN 978-0-300-19655-9
