= Listed buildings in Arwarton =

Civil Parish in Suffolk, England

Arwarton is a village and civil parish in the Babergh District of Suffolk, England. It contains seven listed buildings that are recorded in the National Heritage List for England. Of these two are grade I, one is grade II* and four are grade II.

This list is based on the information retrieved online from Historic England.

== Key ==
Grade	Criteria
I	Buildings that are of exceptional interest
II*	Particularly important buildings of more than special interest
II	Buildings that are of special interest

== Listing ==
Name	Grade	Location	Type	Completed (Note: The date given is the date used by Historic England as significant for the initial building or that of an important part in the structure's description.)	Date designated	Grid ref. (Note: The grid reference is based on the British national grid reference system, sometimes known as OSGB36, used by the Ordnance Survey.) Geo-coordinates	Notes	Entry number (Note: The "List Entry Number" is a unique number assigned to each listed building and scheduled monument by Historic England.)	Image	Wikidata
Queens House	II	Queens Road, Erwarton, Ipswich, IP9 1LN	pub		13 August 1988	TM2157634580; 51°57′56″N 1°13′26″E		1351637	Queens House More images	Q26634721
Church Farmhouse	II	The Street			22 February 1955	TM2187234709; 51°58′00″N 1°13′42″E		1036906	Upload Photo	Q26288582
Church of St Mary	I	The Street	church building		22 February 1955	TM2208334670; 51°57′58″N 1°13′53″E		1286145	Church of St Mary More images	Q17542386
Erwarton Almshouses	II	The Street	almshouse		22 February 1955	TM2204434696; 51°57′59″N 1°13′51″E		1036905	Erwarton Almshouses More images	Q26288581
Erwarton Hall	II*	The Street	house		23 February 1989	TM2229735122; 51°58′12″N 1°14′05″E		1351638	Erwarton Hall More images	Q17534551
Erwarton Hall Gatehouse	I	The Street, Erwarton, IP9 1LQ	gatehouse		23 February 1989	TM2232335205; 51°58′15″N 1°14′07″E		1193599	Erwarton Hall Gatehouse More images	Q17533790
Erwarton War Memorial	II	The Street, Erwarton, IP9 1LJ			29 May 2020	TM2207334693; 51°57′59″N 1°13′53″E		1470057	Upload Photo	Q97458184

== See also ==
- Grade I listed buildings in Suffolk
- Grade II* listed buildings in Suffolk

== Sources ==
- Bettely, James; Pevsner, Nikolaus (2015) [1961], Suffolk: West, The Buildings of England, New Haven and London: Yale University Press, ISBN 978-0-300-19655-9
