= Ha'penny Breeze =

1950 film by Frank Worth

- Cover of DVD release
- Directed by: Frank Worth
- Written by: Don Sharp; Frank Worth
- Produced by: D’arcy Conyers
- Starring: Don Sharp
- Music by: Philip Green
- Production company: The Storytellers
- Release date: 1950
- Country: United Kingdom
- Language: English
- Budget: £8,000 or "well less than £20,000"

Ha'penny Breeze is a 1950 black and white British film directed by Frank Worth and starring Edwin Richfield, Don Sharp and Gwynneth Vaughan. It was the first writing credit for Sharp who also appears as an actor.

== Plot ==
David King and his Australian friend Johnny return to a Suffolk coastal village after the Second World War to find the community completely dispirited.

His mother had told him that his father had died during his absence, but not that the family boat-building business had closed. His father was also the mayor, but no-one has been elected in his place.

They have little luck encouraging the locals to rejoin them in the boatyard, but set about a project of converting one of their old boats into a pleasure yacht. However, this does little to encourage the old workers as they view yachts as "parasite" crafts in relation to the fishing vessels formerly made. Nevertheless, they determine to enter the as yet unfinished yacht, Allana, into a race. Only when they see her in sail do they start to gain interest.

However, when a new friend, Richard Martin, joins their circle, the villagers start to talk, as they know his name. Richard has a rival yacht, Moonraker. He says if Allana wins the race he will place an order with the boatyard.

David's sister Joan is romanced by Johnny and becomes part of the crew, but during the race she falls overboard and they lose the race stopping to rescue her. Richard wins the race but is chastised for not stopping to help.

== Cast ==
- Edwin Richfield as David King
- Don Sharp as Johnny Craig
- Gwynneth Vaughan as Joan King
- Terry Everitt as Brian King
- Eva Rowland as Mrs. King
- Roger Maxwell as Mr. Simmonds
- John Powe as Barney
- Darcy Conyers as Richard Martin
- Rigby Foster as Len

== Production ==
The film was an idea of Australians Don Sharp and Frank Worth who met in England. Sharp was appearing in the play Cage Me a Peacock with Conyers and Richfield. They were inspired by low budget films being made in Italy on location, which saved money by not using sets or stars. They decided to find a location and write a script around it. Conyers had an old sailing cutter at Pin Mill and suggested that as a location.

Sharp and Worth wrote the story together over a three-month period. They formed their own production company with Conyers and succeeded in raising finance with William Freshman attached as executive producer. Sharp says although the budget was eight thousand pounds "we might as well have asked for a million" and "studios didn't even want to read the script. It wasn't a big enough subject for independent producers. It wasn't violent enough for the makers of B pictures. Hopes wer raised several times bu big talking bif promising fringe people we met in the pubs of Wardour Street."

The breakthrough came when a journalist friend of theirs, Dick Richards, read the script, liked it, and ran a story on their efforts to raise funds in the Sunday Pictorial. This attracted the attention of "business men in the North to 'have a flutter' for half the £8,000" for "the fun of participating in the making of a film."

The bulk of the money came from George N. Gregory who sold his Leeds auction business to help finance. Conyers financed with some of his fee from appearing in a play. With half the budget raised, Sharp and his partners got Associated British to agree to provide the balance of the budget.

Filming took place in October 1949 on location in Suffolk. Poor weather caused the film to go over schedule and over budget. Philip Green agreed to do music in exchange for nothing and the musicians were paid by the producers selling their shares in the company.

Associated British Pathe offered to distribute on the understanding that everyone would be paid ten pounds a week. A Leeds auctioneer chipped in a few thousand pounds and the filmmakers provided money themselves. When Associated British saw the film they covered the cost of the movie.

The film was shot in Pin Mill, a small fishing village on the River Orwell in Suffolk. Some scenes were shot in the Butt and Oyster inn.

== Critical reception ==
According to Sharp the film "received a favourable press. Some notices were unreservedly enthusiastic, others were critical of naive qualities and amateur moments; but on the whole they applauded the idea and method."

The Monthly Film Bulletin wrote: "This is a worthy attempt by a new British company to make an independent, inexpensive film (without, incidentally, the help of the Film Finance Corporation). The story is simple, naive and not too well constructed, but its backgrounds are authentic and attractive. The photography is good, and the whole film has a pleasant freshness."

The Scotsman said the film had "too much of the naivete and the emotion of the amateur shine through [...] often the dialogue is trite and for most of the film the tempo is depressingly perambulatory" but praised the "camera's mobility and many a good character sketch by" the actors.

The Sunday Times wrote: "Has both charm and talent".

Kine Weekly said "Fresh, uninhibited and disarmingly ingenuous regional romantic drama. The acting of the young players and the "locals" is eager, and the backgrounds are both picturesque and authentic.Its integrity and sincerity amply atone for a somewhat untidy script. Essentially English, good humoured and thrilling, it should please on most double bills."

After finishing the film Sharp fell ill with tuberculosis and was in hospital for two years. However when he got out he was offered a job at Group Three Productions which launched his career in the British film industry. "No doubt about it, Ha'penny Breeze paid off," he said.

== Notes ==
- Sharp, Don (July 1963). "How to get into films by the people themselves". Films and Filming. pp. 13–14.
