= Erwarton Hall and Gatehouse =

Grade II* listed house and Grade I listed gatehouse in Suffolk, United Kingdom

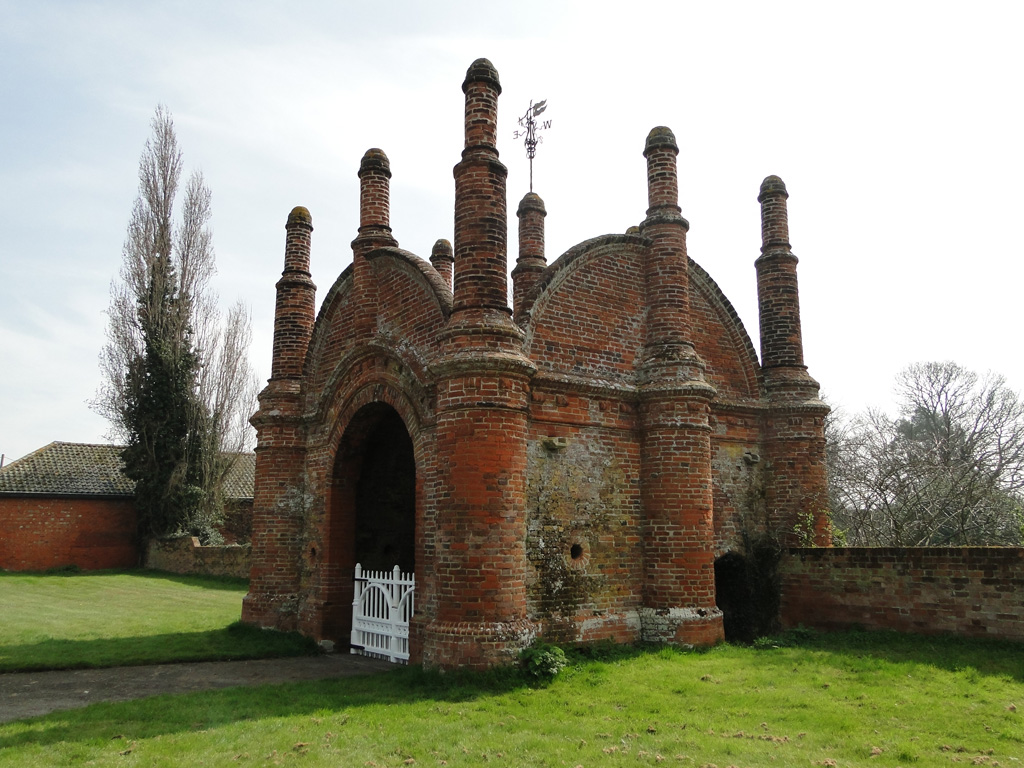
- an "outstanding early example in England of Renaissance architecture"

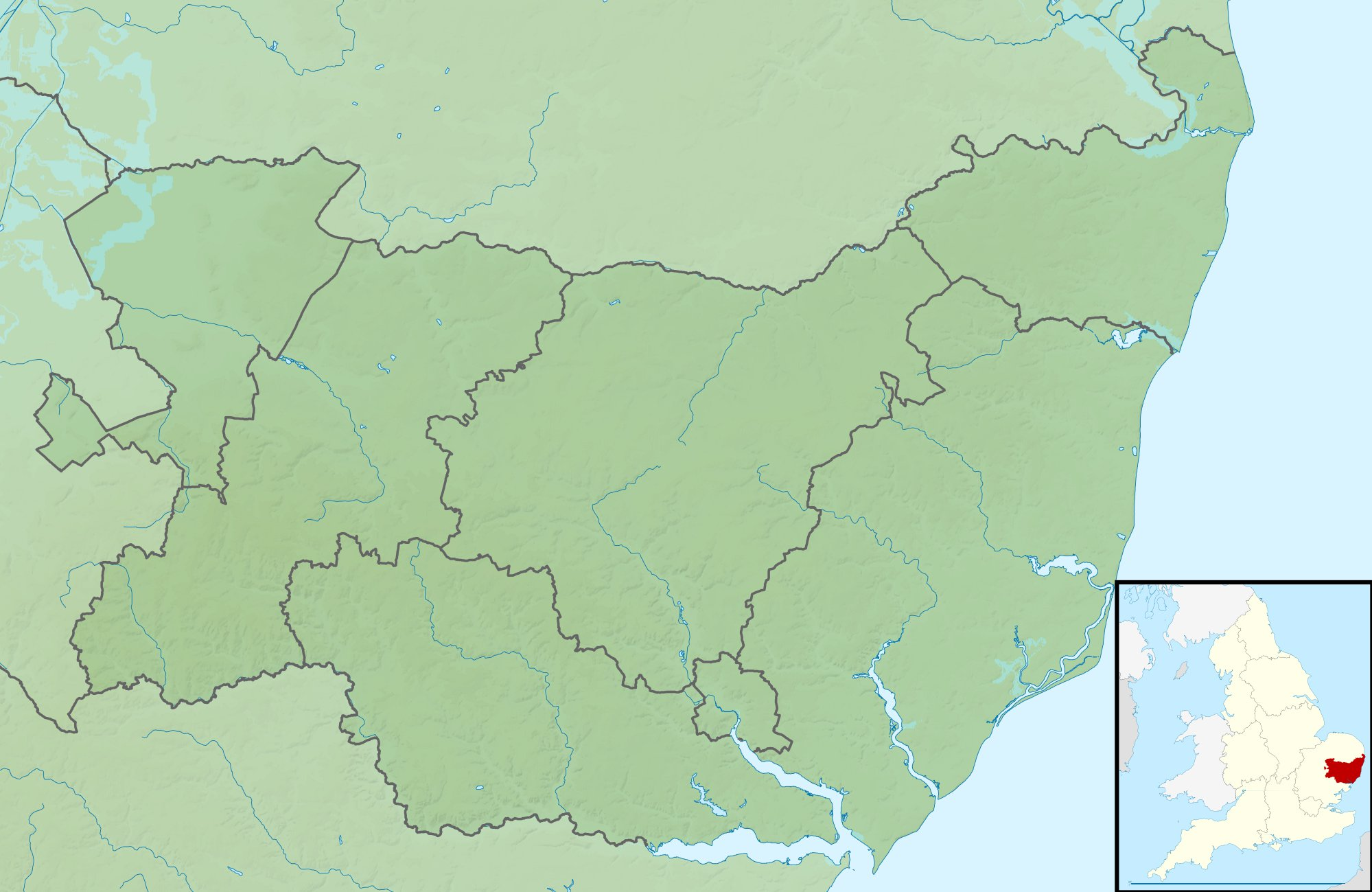
- Location within Suffolk
- 51.9701°N 1.2349°E
- Type: House and gatehouse
- Location: Erwarton, Suffolk

History
- Built: 16th century, with earlier origins and later additions

Site notes
- Architect: Sir Philip Parker
- Architectural style: Elizabethan architecture
- Owner: Private

Listed Building – Grade I
- Official name: Erwarton Hall Gatehouse
- Designated: 23 February 1989
- Reference no.: 1193599

Listed Building – Grade II*
- Official name: Erwarton Hall
- Designated: 23 February 1989
- Reference no.: 1351638

Erwarton Hall and Gatehouse stand to the north of the village of Erwarton, on the Shotley Peninsula in Suffolk, England. Although earlier structures stood on the site, the present hall was rebuilt in around 1575 by Sir Philip Parker. The gatehouse is earlier, dating to around 1549. The hall is a Grade II* listed building while the gatehouse is separately listed at Grade I.

== History ==
The village of Erwarton (alternatively Arwarton) is recorded in Domesday. The lordship of the manor was held by the D'Avillars, descending to the Calthorpes. The last of this line, Sir Philip Calthorpe, married Amata Boleyn, becoming uncle-by-marriage of Queen Anne Boleyn. Anne visited Erwarton as a child and a long-held local tradition maintains that her heart is buried in the crypt of the Church of St Mary in the village. (Note: Most sources discount the story. The popular history writer Alison Weir, in her biography of Anne, The Lady in the Tower, notes that the practice of heart-burial had fallen out of favour by the time of Anne's death, and also that the inscribed Victorian plaque in the church commemorating the supposed burial contains incorrect details.) Calthorpe died c.1549 and the Erwarton Gatehouse may have been built to commemorate his memory. The church contains his tomb, situated in the south aisle. (Note: Nikolaus Pevsner, in the second edition of his Suffolk volume in the Buildings of England series published in 1974, described the church as "nicely neglected".)

Peter Ashley, in his study Comings and goings: Gatehouses and Lodges published in association with English Heritage, notes that while gatehouses have their origins in defensive architecture, they evolved from being "the first line of defence [to] the first line in a style offensive". The Erwarton Gatehouse belongs to the second type, Historic England suggesting that a strong central gate was never installed, and that the gatehouse has always stood in isolation without the encircling curtain walls that would have been necessary to make it effective as a bar to encroachment. In the Tudor era, from which the Erwarton Lodge dates, this trend accelerated, and East Anglia contains some important examples, such as the gatehouse at Layer Marney in Essex and that at Oxburgh Hall in Norfolk. Timothy Mowl, is his work on lodges, Trumpet at a Distant Gate writes that "the desire of an owner to impress a visitor outweighed his wish to repel an attacking force".

The manor house was redeveloped by Sir Philip Parker, around 25 years after the construction of the gatehouse. The manor passed out of the ownership of the Parker family in the 18th century. For most of the 20th, the hall was leased by the Ministry of Defence for use as the official home of the commander of the HMS Ganges naval training school, located at Shotley. In the 18th and 19th centuries, the gatehouse became a favoured subject for artists touring East Anglia. It was sketched by George Frost and Thomas Hearne and a drawing of it by Francis Grose was used as an illustration on the Frog Service, a large dinner and dessert service created by Wedgwood for Catherine the Great of Russia.

In 2024 an appeal to allow a housing development at Erwarton Farm, immediately adjacent to the hall, was turned down. Objections to the proposal had been lodged by the hall's current owners, and by Griff Rhys Jones and the former Member of Parliament (MP) for Suffolk Coastal, John Gummer.

== Architecture and description ==
The "spectacular" gatehouse is of red brick with a central tunnel supported by six buttresses. These, and three cardinal points on the roof, are topped by elaborate pinnacles. The gatehouse is single-storeyed, with entrance gates set into each end. No architect is known, but the style is described by Historic England as an "outstanding early example in England of Renaissance architecture". (Note: James Bettley, in his Suffolk Pevsner attributes the 1549 dating to "heraldic reasons" and notes similarities to the gatehouse at Beckingham Hall, across the county border in Tolleshunt Major in Essex.)

The hall is of two storeys with attics, also in red brick and under a tiled roof. John Bettley, in his Suffolk: East volume in the Pevsner Buildings of England series, suggests that the hall was originally built to a typical Elizabethan H-plan but that the east and west wings were removed subsequently. It is listed at Grade II* while the gatehouse is separately listed at Grade I. (Note: The listing designation for the gatehouse was raised from Grade II* to Grade I, the highest grade, in December 2020.)

== Gallery ==
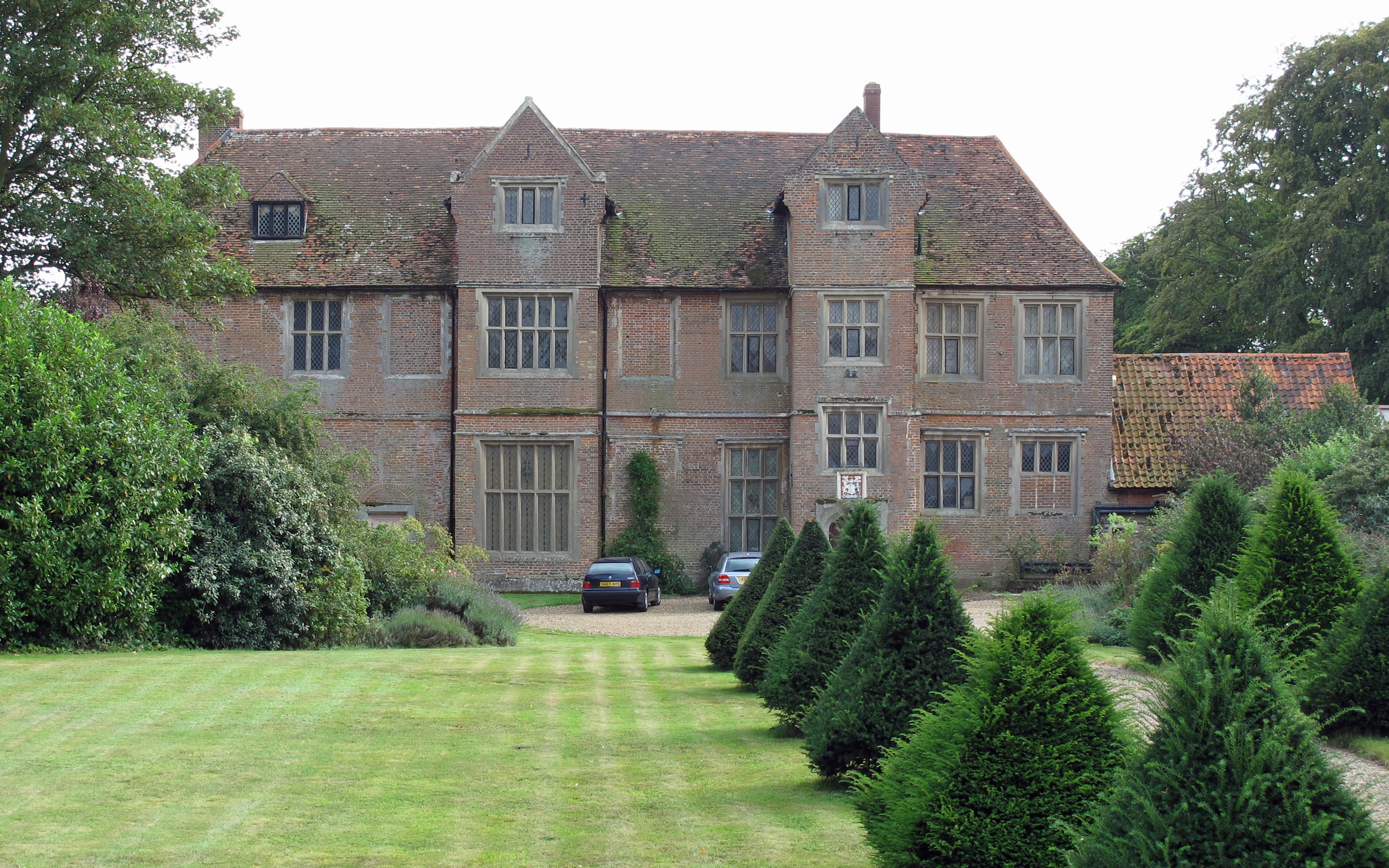
Erwarton Hall

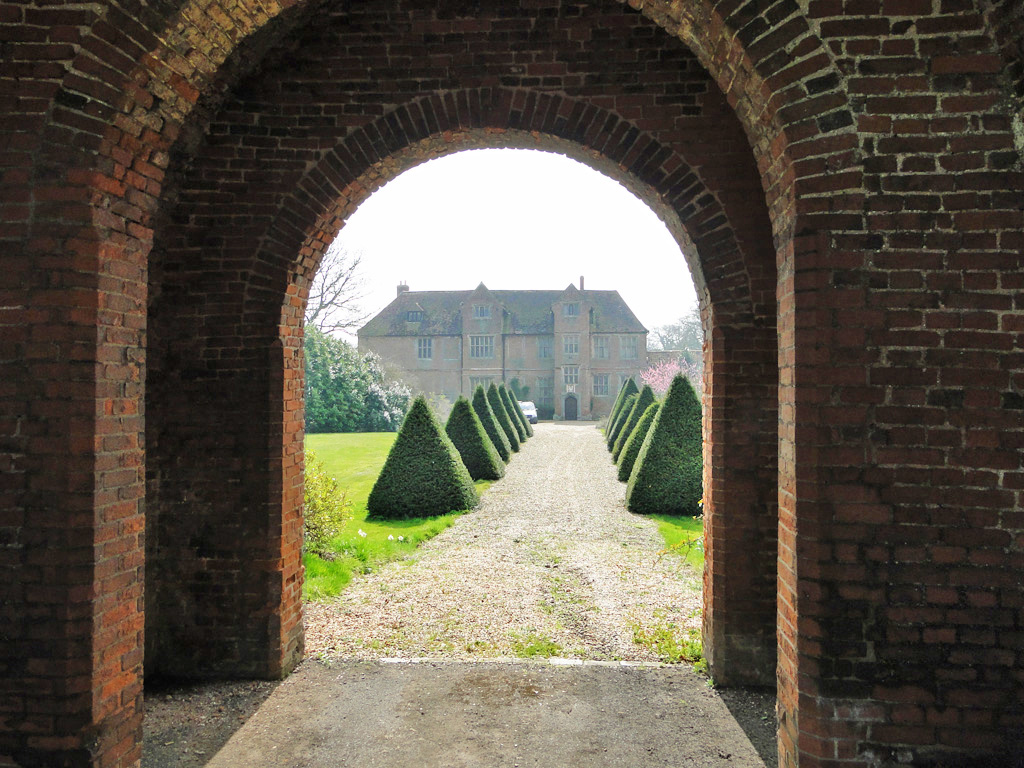
The hall viewed through the gatehouse arch

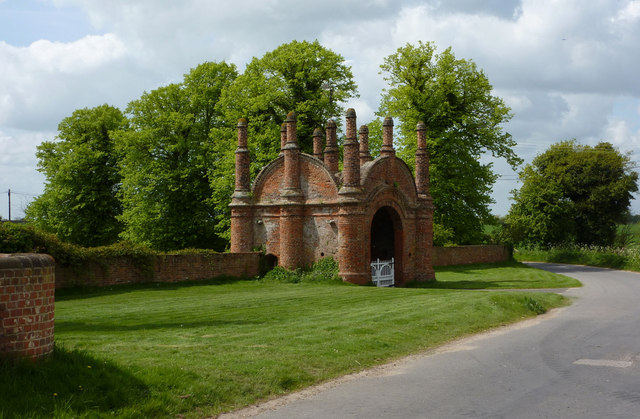
The gatehouse from the road

== Sources ==
- Ashley, Peter (2002). Comings and goings: Gatehouses and lodges. London: Everyman Publishers. ISBN 978-1-841-59081-3.
- Bettley, James; Pevsner, Nikolaus (2015). Suffolk: East. Pevsner Buildings of England. New Haven, US and London: Yale University Press. ISBN 978-0-300-19654-2. OCLC 910928847.
- Mowl, Timothy; Earnshaw, Brian (1985). Trumpet At A Distant Gate: The Lodge as Prelude to the Country House. London: Waterstone. ISBN 978-0-947-75205-7. OCLC 12530444.
- Pevsner, Nikolaus; Radcliffe, Enid (1974). Suffolk. Pevsner Buildings of England. Harmsworth, Middlesex: Penguin Books. ISBN 978-0-140-71020-5. OCLC 971119299.
- Weir, Alison (2011). The Lady in the Tower: The Fall of Anne Boleyn. London: Random House. ISBN 978-1-446-44904-2.
