= Quested =

- Language: English

Origin
- Derivation: Toponymic
- Region of origin: Wherstead, Suffolk

Other names
- Alternative spelling: Quersted, Querstede

Quested is an English surname. It originated as a toponymic surname referring to Wherstead in the county of Suffolk. Variant spellings include Quersted and Querstede. Early records of bearers of this surname include a John Querstede of Norfolk in the Close Rolls for 1376.

Data compiled by Patrick Hanks on the basis of the 2011 United Kingdom census and the Census of Ireland 2011 found 253 people with the surname Quested on the island of Great Britain and none on the island of Ireland. The 1881 United Kingdom census found 195 people with this surname, mostly in Kent.

People with this surname include:

- James Head Quested (fl. 1820s), Australian ship owner
- John Quested (RAF officer) (1893–1948), English World War I flying ace
- Len Quested (1925–2012), English footballer
- John Quested (producer) (born 1935), British film producer and owner and chairman of Goldcrest Films
- Dave Quested (born 1946), New Zealand cricket umpire
