= Wherstead =

Village in Suffolk, England

Coordinates: 52.023°N 1.139°E

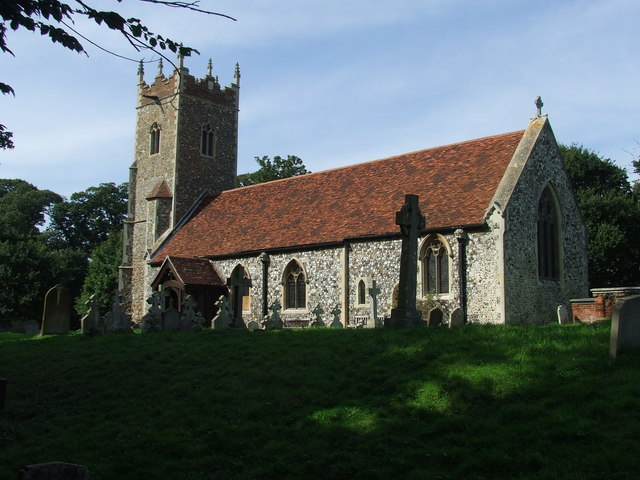
- St Mary's Church, Wherstead

- Location within Suffolk
- Population: 342 (2011)
- OS grid reference: TM157406
- District: Babergh
- Shire county: Suffolk
- Region: East
- Country: England
- Sovereign state: United Kingdom
- Post town: IPSWICH
- Postcode district: IP2, IP9
- Dialling code: 01473
- UK Parliament: South Suffolk

Wherstead is a village and a civil parish located in the county of Suffolk, England. Wherstead village lies 3 miles (4.8 km) south of Ipswich on the Shotley peninsula. It is in the Belstead Brook electoral division of Suffolk County Council.

== History ==
It is an ancient settlement, and from its soil the plough has brought to light many evidences of occupation by Romans and by early Britons. In the Domesday Book of 1086 the place is described under the Old English names Querstede and Wervesteda. Toponymic surnames which originate from Wherstead include Quested and Quersted. The name of the village and parish is in today generally pronounced Wersted or Warsted by the residents, the "a" in the latter case having the sound of "a" in father.

=== Paul family ===
The Paul farming and malting family brought land in Wherstead in 1934. The late George Paul earned an MBE, following a long had association with Suffolk Horses and horseracing. His son and nephews run Suffolk Food Hall.

== Buildings ==
=== Church of St Mary ===
The Church of St Mary, Wherstead, is an Anglican church situated on a hill top site occupied by a church since 1086. It is currently managed by the Two Rivers Benefice, which is composed of the Parishes of Stutton, Holbrook, Woolverstone and Freston, as well as Wherstead.

Foster Barham Zincke was vicar of St Mary, Wherstead when he wrote Materials for the History of Wherstead first published as a series of articles in the Suffolk Chronicle, which were later gathered into book form. Following the publication of the First Edition, in 1887. The subsequent Second Edition featured additional material gathered in Part II: Wherstead in Domesday.

=== Bourne Bridge ===
Bourne Bridge marks the boundary of Wherstead parish. Near the bridge stands the Ostrich Inn. At the time of the New England migration, oysters were abundant in the River Orwell, and some speculate that Ostrich was a corruption from 'Oyster Ridge' or 'Oyster Reach'. It is more likely that the pub name derives from the crest of lawyer and Chief Justice, Sir Edward Coke, who acquired the surrounding estate in 1609, and the pub sign is similar to others across East Anglia. In 1995 the pub was renamed from The Ostrich to The Oyster Reach. In 2017 the Oyster Reach branding was removed and it is now part of the Beefeater chain.

=== Wherstead Park ===
Wherstead Park is a notable historic house which was converted to an events venue. It closed as such Christmas 2023.
