= Philip Parker (of Erwarton) =

English politician

Sir Philip Parker (1601 – 22 June 1675) was an English politician who sat in the House of Commons from 1640 to 1648.

== Biography ==
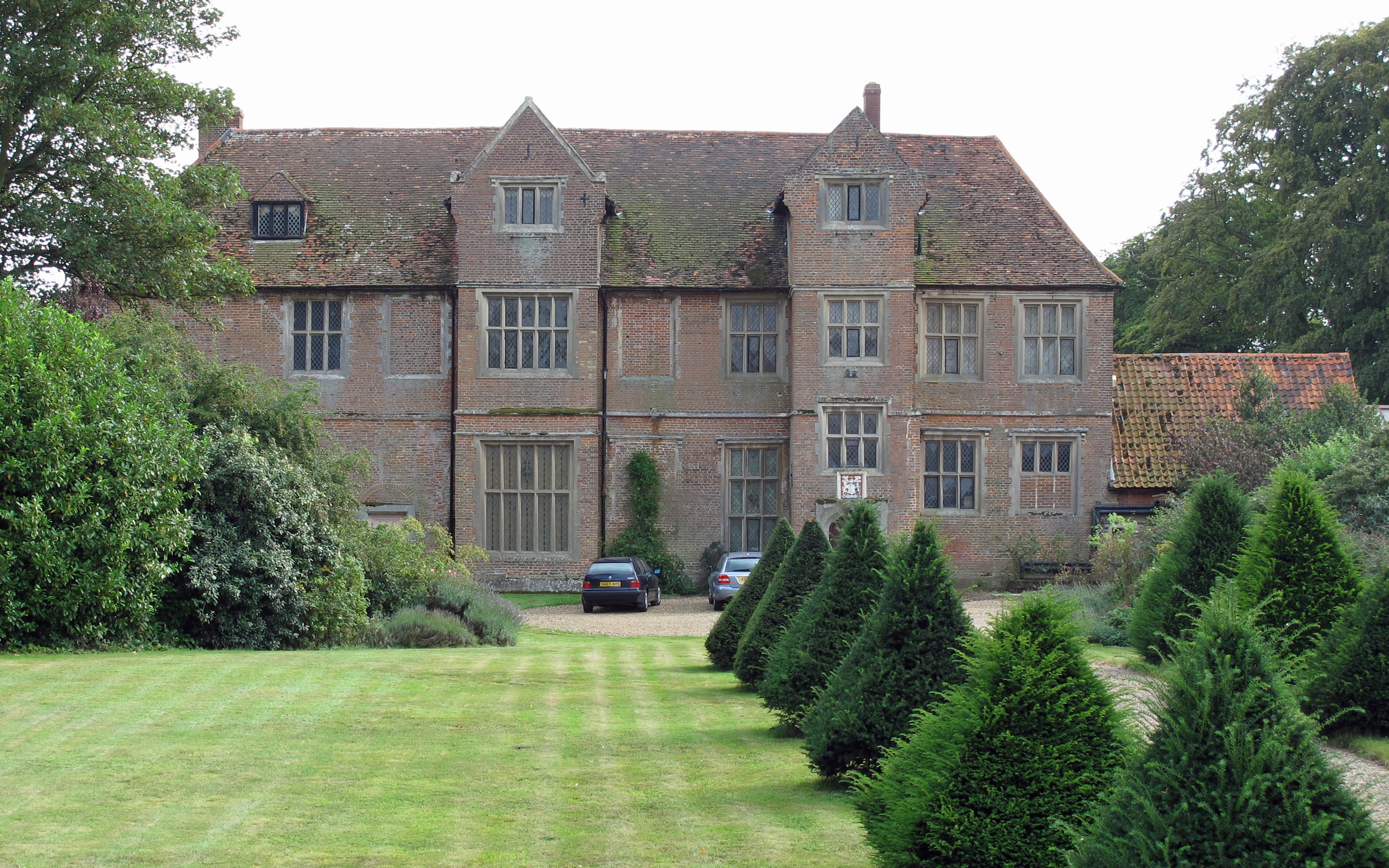
Erwarton Hall

Parker was the son of Sir Calthorpe Parker of Groton, Suffolk and his wife Mercy Soame, daughter of Sir Stephen Soame, Lord Mayor of London. He was admitted at Queens' College, Cambridge on 18 April 1618 and admitted at the Inner Temple in 1621. He was knighted on 19 November 1624. He came into possession of the family estate at Erwarton Hall and was High Sheriff of Suffolk in 1637.

In April 1640, Parker was elected Member of Parliament for Suffolk in the Short Parliament. He was re-elected in November 1640 for the Long Parliament and sat until 1648 when he was excluded under Pride's Purge.

Parker married Dorothy Gawdy, daughter of Sir Robert Gawdy of Claxton, Norfolk. Their son Philip later became a baronet.

Parliament of England
| Vacant Parliament suspended since 1629 | Member of Parliament for Suffolk; 1640–1648; With: Sir Nathaniel Barnardiston | Not represented in the Rump Parliament |
