= Butt and Oyster =

Historic inn by the River Orwell in Suffolk

The Butt and Oyster
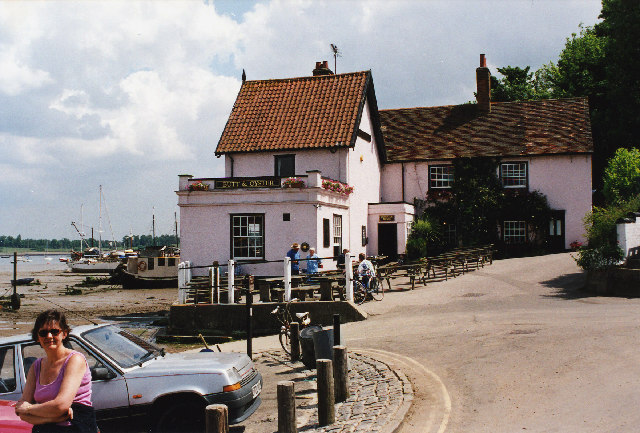
- in 2001
- Interactive map of the The Butt and Oyster area
- Alternative names: The Three Ducks

General information
- Type: Inn
- Architectural style: Timber-framed
- Location: Pin Mill
- Coordinates: 51.9964°N 1.2127°E

Website
- Deben Inns

The Butt and Oyster is an old inn on the River Orwell in Pin Mill, Suffolk.

It was listed for preservation in 1989 and English Heritage dated parts of the structure back to the 17th century. Historical records go back as far as 1456, when a water bailiff held court hearings there. It was subsequently recorded as a public house in 1553. Its name may refer to the barrels used to pack and ship oysters or flounders.

The Butt and Oyster is featured in the 1937 children's book We Didn't Mean to Go to Sea by Arthur Ransome, who patronised the inn himself. It subsequently appeared in the 1950 movie Ha'penny Breeze and the 1993 TV series Lovejoy, in which it was renamed "The Three Ducks".

Bill Bailey took Sir Trevor McDonald there in his show, Perfect Pub Walks. Ed Sheeran recorded a music video there.
