= Erwarton =

Village in Suffolk, England

Coordinates: 51.966°N 1.227°E

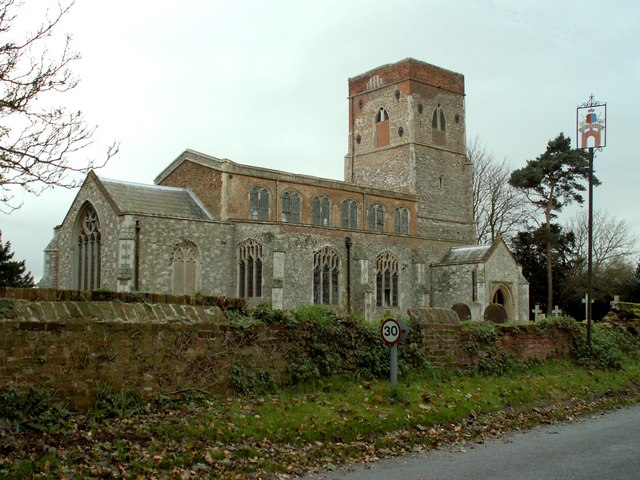
- St. Mary's Church, Erwarton

- Location within Suffolk
- Area: 5.23 km^{2} (2.02 sq mi)
- Population: 126 (2011)
  - Density: 24/km^{2} (62/sq mi)
- Civil parish: Arwarton
- District: Babergh
- Shire county: Suffolk
- Region: East
- Country: England
- Sovereign state: United Kingdom
- Post town: Ipswich
- Postcode district: IP9
- UK Parliament: South Suffolk

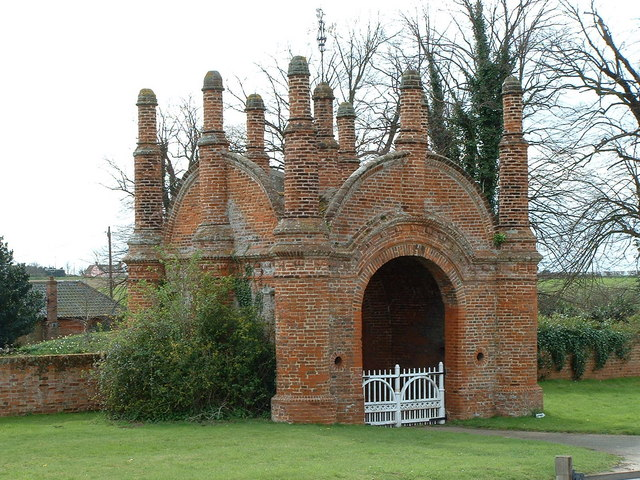
Erwarton Hall Gatehouse

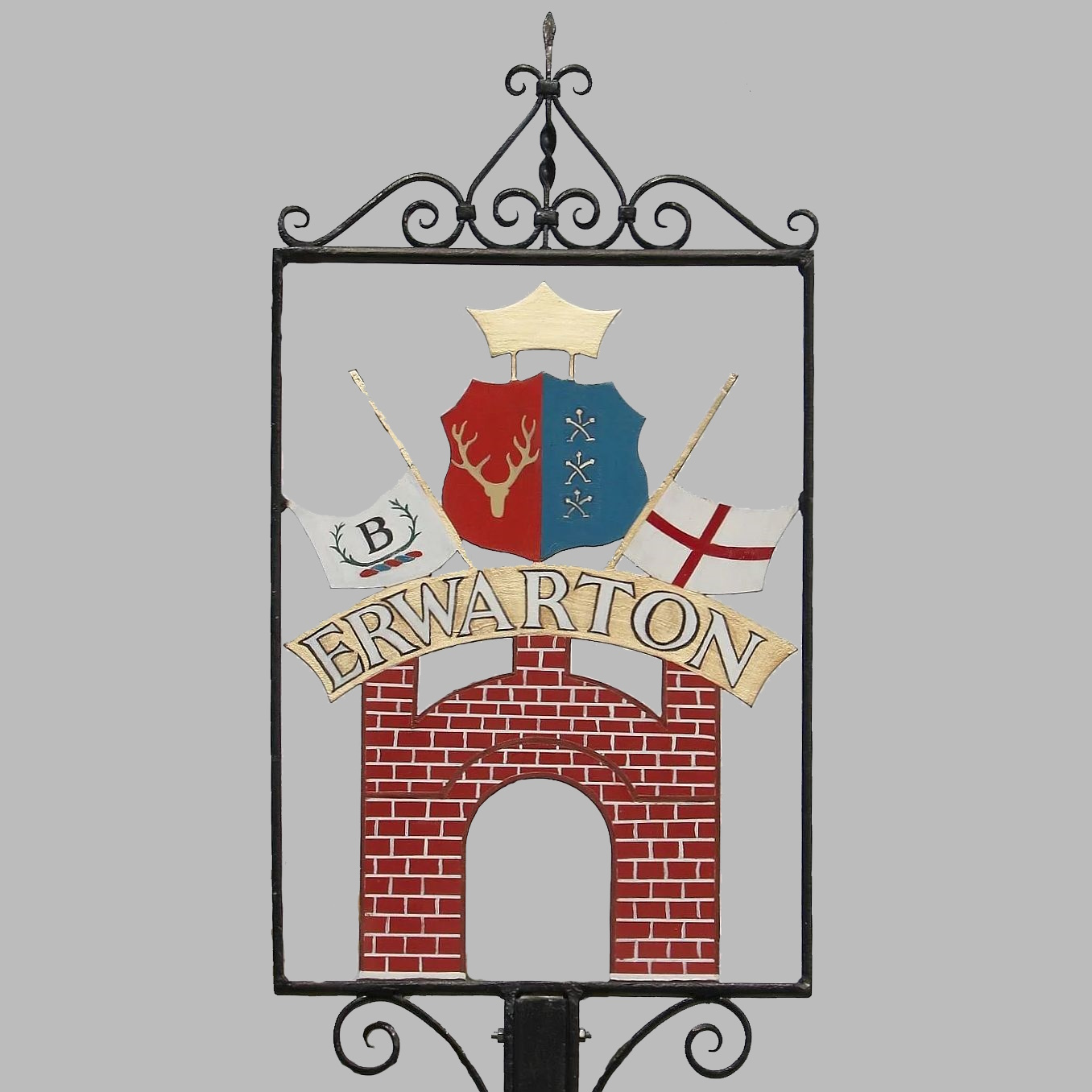
Erwarton Village Sign, Suffolk

Erwarton or Arwarton is a small village and civil parish in the Babergh district of Suffolk, England. The parish includes the hamlet of Shop Corner. Located on the Shotley peninsula around 9 miles (14 km) south of Ipswich, in 2005 it had a population of 110, increasing to 126 at the 2011 Census.

Neighbouring villages include Shotley, Shotley Gate, Harkstead, Chelmondiston and Holbrook.

The name originates from the Early Saxon Eoforweard tūn.

== Places of interest ==
=== St. Mary's church, Erwarton ===
Monuments within St. Mary's church date from the 13th century, although the present building is largely 15th century. A copy of a drawing of Queen Anne Boleyn by Holbein is attached to the 1912 organ. Under the organ is a note stating "...after her execution in the Tower of London, 19 May 1536, it was recorded that her heart was buried in this church by her Uncle, Sir Philip Parker of Erwarton Hall". In 1837 a leaden casket was discovered in the church which, by tradition, is believed to contain Boleyn's heart, although there was no inscription. The church baptismal font is adorned with a rather distinctive example of a Tudor Rose. The church tower was strengthened in the 1800s after damage by lightning, but by 2012 was in desperate need of repair.

=== Erwarton Hall ===
Erwarton Hall, a Grade II* listed building, was rebuilt in about 1575 by Sir Phillip Parker. The Grade I listed gatehouse is a well-known local landmark.

The estate passed through marriage to John Howe, 2nd Baron Chedworth in the C18 and in 1775 was sold to Charles Berners. Between 1905 and 1976 the Hall was leased to the Admiralty for the use of the Commanders of HMS Ganges, a training establishment based at Shotley Gate. It has been in private hands since the navy's departure.

=== Queens Head ===
The Queens Head, a Grade II listed public house, dates from the 17th century or earlier. This pub was formerly owned by Tolly Cobbold.

== History ==
=== Twentieth century plague outbreak ===
Between 1906 and 1918 the area saw the last outbreak of plague in England. This happened on the Shotley peninsula and in Trimley, now part of Felixstowe. A total of 22 people were affected, 6 recovered, the rest died. The last two cases were from Warren Cottages, Erwarton: On 8 June 1918, Mrs Annie Mary Bugg of Warren Lane Cottages, Erwarton aged 52, fell ill and died on 13 June 1918 and was buried in Erwarton church yard. No sign of her grave can be found now. On 16 June 1918 Bugg's neighbour Mrs Gertrude Allice Garrod, aged 42, of Warren Lane Cottages also fell ill and died on 19 June 1918, and was also buried at Erwarton graveyard. Her gravestone can still be found there.

== Notable residents ==
- Thomas Sedgwick (c. 1512 - 1573), clergyman and professor.
- Philip Parker (died 1675), Member of Parliament for Suffolk and High Sheriff of Suffolk.
- Sir Philip Parker, 1st Baronet (c. 1625 – 1690), Member of Parliament for Harwich and Sandwich.
- Henry Berners (1769 - 1852), clergyman and Archdeacon of Suffolk.
