= Shotley Peninsula =

Peninsula in Babergh, Suffolk, England

Coordinates: 51.9954°N 1.163°E

Map showing the location of the Shotley peninsula at grid reference TM1738

The Shotley Peninsula is a rural area east of the A137 Ipswich-Colchester road located between the rivers Stour and Orwell in Suffolk, England. The peninsula is named after the settlements of Shotley and Shotley Gate which are situated near its south-eastern tip. Other villages on the peninsula include Chelmondiston, Erwarton (Arwarton), Freston, Harkstead, Holbrook, Stutton, Tattingstone, Wherstead and Woolverstone.

The population was 10,310 according to the 2001 Census, approximately 12.4% of the total population of Babergh District.

== Geography ==
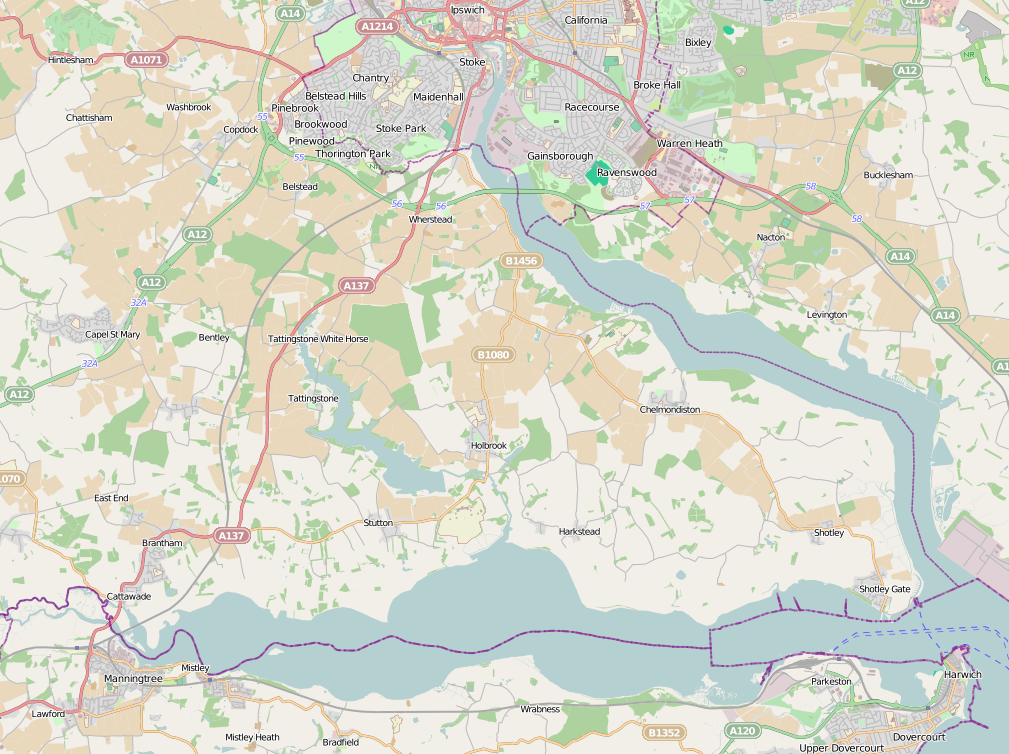
Shotley peninsula

The rivers Stour and Orwell meet at Shotley Gate and merge to join with the North Sea in Harwich Harbour. The Stour and Orwell is a designated Special Protection Area, a Site of Special Scientific Interest and a Ramsar site for wetland habitats.

The landscape is predominantly ancient estate farmlands, with salt marshes and intertidal mudflats. The mudflats are an important winter feeding area for estuary birds, wild fowl and waders. The wetlands and estuaries are home to otters and water voles. There are significant areas of woodland, parkland and hedgerows with dormouse and stag beetle populations. Trips to places of local interest can be arranged through Shotley Peninsula Tours The main crops farmed on the peninsula are winter wheat, winter and spring barley, potatoes and sugar beet. The climate and soil on the peninsula are also suitable for viticulture and a vineyard occupies the valley below St. Mary's church, Shotley.For a period in the recent past the vineyard allowed to stand fallow. Under new ownership the vineyard and grape harvest has increased in size, and won awards for both the Baccus and Pinot Noir grape varieties.

Footpaths on the peninsula shoreline are at risk of coastal erosion, which is being mitigated by the efforts of the local community. In light of climate change and the risk of rising sea levels, a farm in Shotley has been planning to breach the sea wall in a managed retreat (or coastal realignment) to create new habitats and landscapes, supporting tourism in the region.

The Shotley peninsular experiences a maritime climate with a narrow range of temperature and rainfall spread evenly throughout the year. The nearest weather station for which data is available is East Bergholt, 7 miles west of Holbrook. See Ipswich Climate data.

== History and archaeology ==
There is archaeological evidence of Bronze Age barrows, and late Iron Age or Roman field enclosures. Several groups of Iron Age coins and a small group of late Saxon finds have been discovered on the peninsula. In 1995, an Anglo-Saxon fish trap dating from between 650AD and 1050AD was found on the mudflats at Holbrook Bay.

Several settlements on the peninsula are mentioned in the Domesday survey of 1068. The peninsula lies within the historic Samford Hundred.

Deposits of clay along the shoreline were used by brick works in the 19th and early 20th centuries at Holbrook Creek, Shotley, Hare's Creek (Shotley) and Bourne Hill in Wherstead.

== Leisure activities and places of interest ==
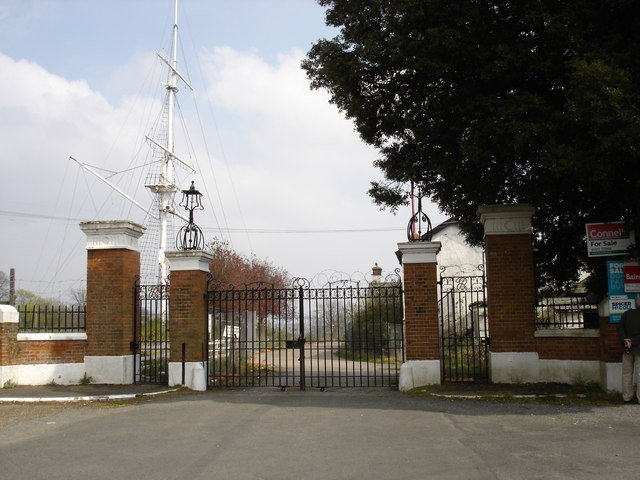
Main entrance to H.M.S. Ganges – geograph.org.uk – 1247889

The peninsula lies within the Suffolk Coast and Heaths Area of Outstanding Natural Beauty, and there are many rights of way. The Stour and Orwell Walk is a coastal footpath that starts from the Orwell Bridge and extends around the peninsula to Cattawade, providing links with the Essex Way.

Towards the tip of the peninsula there are extensive views of the Port of Felixstowe, Landguard Fort, the town of Harwich and Harwich International Port. The dense marine traffic criss-crossing the deep-water channels to the Haven ports comprises container ships, cruise ships, pleasure craft and sailboats.

The attractive riverside hamlet of Pin Mill and marinas at Woolverstone and Shotley Gate make the peninsula a popular sailing destination. Alton Water is a reservoir that offers a variety of activities such as birdwatching, sailing, windsurfing, walking and cycling.

The Old Hall at Shotley is a 16th-century grade II listed building, with evidence of a medieval moat. Erwarton Hall, Crowe Hall (Stutton) and Stutton Hall are substantial Tudor and Jacobean houses that overlook the Stour estuary to the south. The Royal Hospital School at Holbrook is a significant landmark on the peninsula, as is the mast of the former Royal Navy Training Establishment (HMS Ganges) at Shotley Gate.

== Transport ==
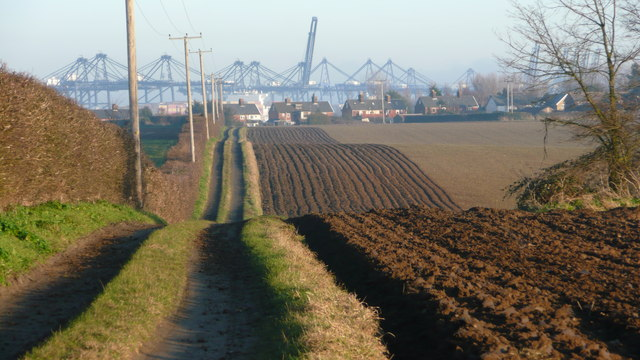
Shotley – rolling fields – geograph.org.uk – 1120722

The local transport network is limited, with the B1456, B1080 and a number of minor roads linking the settlements, no rail station and restricted bus services. The B1456 road is periodically at risk of temporary flooding along the Strand near the Orwell bridge.

In the summer months a foot and cycle ferry service licensed to carry up to 12 passengers operates between Shotley Marina, Harwich and Felixstowe.

The South Suffolk Cycle Route crosses the peninsula, and there is a campaign to create a dedicated traffic-free cycling route between Shotley Gate and Bourne Bridge, Ipswich.
