= Woolverstone =

Village in Suffolk, England

Coordinates: 52.002261°N 1.184892°E

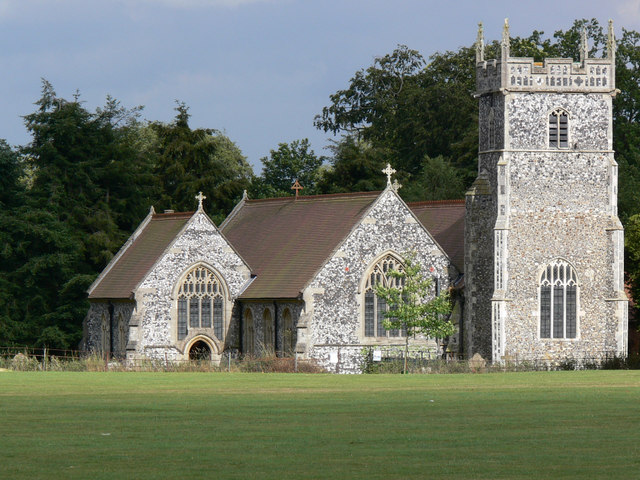
- St Michael's, Woolverstone

- Location within Suffolk
- Population: 265 (2011)
- District: Babergh
- Shire county: Suffolk
- Region: East
- Country: England
- Sovereign state: United Kingdom
- Post town: Ipswich
- Postcode district: IP9
- Police: Suffolk
- Fire: Suffolk
- Ambulance: East of England
- UK Parliament: South Suffolk

Woolverstone is a small village and civil parish in Suffolk, England located on the Shotley peninsula. It is situated about 6.4 km (4.0 mi) south of Ipswich, near the southern shore of the River Orwell. In 2005 it had a population of 240, increasing to 265 at the 2011 census.

It is now home to the Ipswich High School, which moved to the vacated premises of the former Woolverstone Hall School in 1992 after having been well established in Ipswich since 1878. The Woolverstone Marina and the Royal Harwich Yacht Club are also located in the vicinity.

HMS Woolverstone, a Royal Navy landing craft training and loading base, was housed in the school and used moorings in the River Orwell between 1943 and 1944.

== Facilities ==
The main part of the village is situated either side of the Ipswich to Shotley road (B1456). The village itself has no pubs, shops or Post Office; however, it has a village hall, a church, and a popular marina where there is a chandlery for provisions and a local bar and restaurant named Buttermans.

The area is served by primary schools at Chelmondiston, Holbrook, Tattingstone and Shotley and the nearest secondary school, Holbrook High School, which shares a site with the Peninsula Sports Centre.

There is a regular bus service (route 97) from Ipswich Old Cattle Market to Shotley Marina which passes through the village.

The parish church is dedicated to St Michael, and belongs to the Church of England's Diocese of St Edmundsbury and Ipswich.

== History ==
The name Woolverstone (originally Woluestun) is supposedly derived from Wulfhere, whose “tun” or enclosure was at its beginning. There have been numerous archaeological finds in the area, including flint axes and an arrowhead believed to be Neolithic, beaker shards and flints from the Bronze Age, shards and a brooch from the Romans, and a coin and brooch from the Saxons. Two separate holdings in Woolverstone in the hundred of Samford were recorded in the Domesday survey of 1086. The larger area, which prior to the Norman Conquest had been held by Edeva the Fair, was held in 1086 by Count Alan (of Brittany), which also included woodlands for 15 pigs and 10 acres belonging to the Church. The smaller area was held in 1086 by Robert Gernon.

There is a very detailed account of the Parish of Woolverstone and surrounding area between 1639 and 1661 in the book entitled The English Home of Mr. Timothy Dalton, B.A.

== Listed buildings ==
There are a number of notable buildings within Woolverstone, including St Michael's Church (Grade II*), Woolverstone House (Grade II*), Berners Hall (the village hall) (Grade II), The Dairy House (Grade II), The Widows' Homes (Grade II), The Cat House (Grade II) and Woolverstone Hall (Grade I).

The Widows' Homes have two stone monkeys set on the roof, said to relate to an incident where a pet monkey saved a child of the Berners family from a fire.

The Cat House (a Gothic-style house) is reputed to have belonged to a man who was sympathetic to boats carrying contraband along the river. When his favoured cat died he had it stuffed and when he could see that no customs boats were patrolling the river, he put it in the window to signal that the "coast was clear."

Woolverstone House was designed in 1901 by "arts and crafts" architect Sir Edwin Lutyens and was built for Mrs C. Berners, a lay-sister of the East End Sisters of Mercy. The original Gertrude Jekyll gardens have been restored and replanted and the sunken garden has also been given Grade II status.

== Other establishments ==
Woolverstone Marina is set in 22 acres of parkland on the River Orwell, with the Royal Harwich Yacht Club nearby. Woolverstone Marina is one of 21 locations owned and operated by Marina Developments Limited (MDL).

The nearby Royal Harwich Yacht Club is a Victorian yacht club formed in 1843 and has had many Royal connections; Before his death Prince Philip was the Patron. The yacht club moved to its present site soon after World War II after its previous premises had been demolished for the expansion of the Navy Yard at Harwich. In 1973, floating pontoons were stationed at the bottom of the club lawn, which then provided the club with its own marina. The Royal Harwich Yacht Club supports The Woolverstone Project, which has Paul Heiney as Patron and provides sailing for people with disabilities at Woolverstone and the nearby Alton Water reservoir.

Spring Lodge Care Home was formerly the parsonage to Woolverstone Hall, which explains the building's grand yet tranquil appearance. This residential and dementia care home is located at the heart of the village and provides a home to some 40 elderly people.

== Notable people ==
- John Dwight, settler of Dedham, Massachusetts
- Nathaniel Colburn, settler of Dedham, Massachusetts
