= Harkstead =

Village in Suffolk, England

Coordinates: 51.968°N 1.185°E

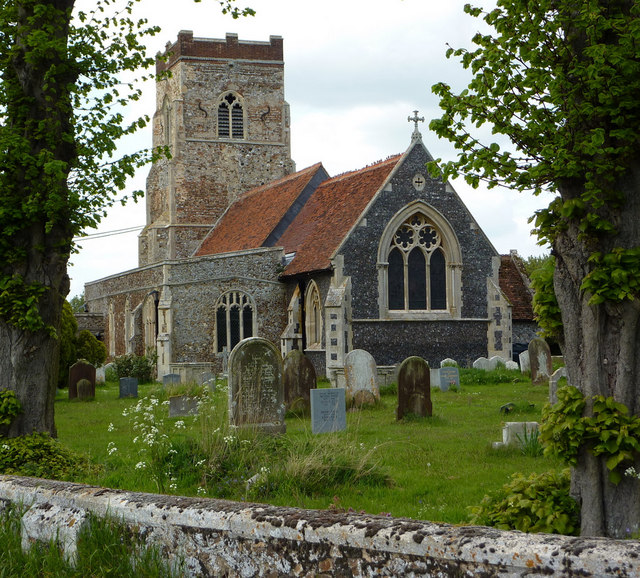
- St Mary's Church, Harkstead

- Location within Suffolk
- Population: 287 (2011)
- District: Babergh
- Shire county: Suffolk
- Region: East
- Country: England
- Sovereign state: United Kingdom
- Post town: Ipswich
- Postcode district: IP9

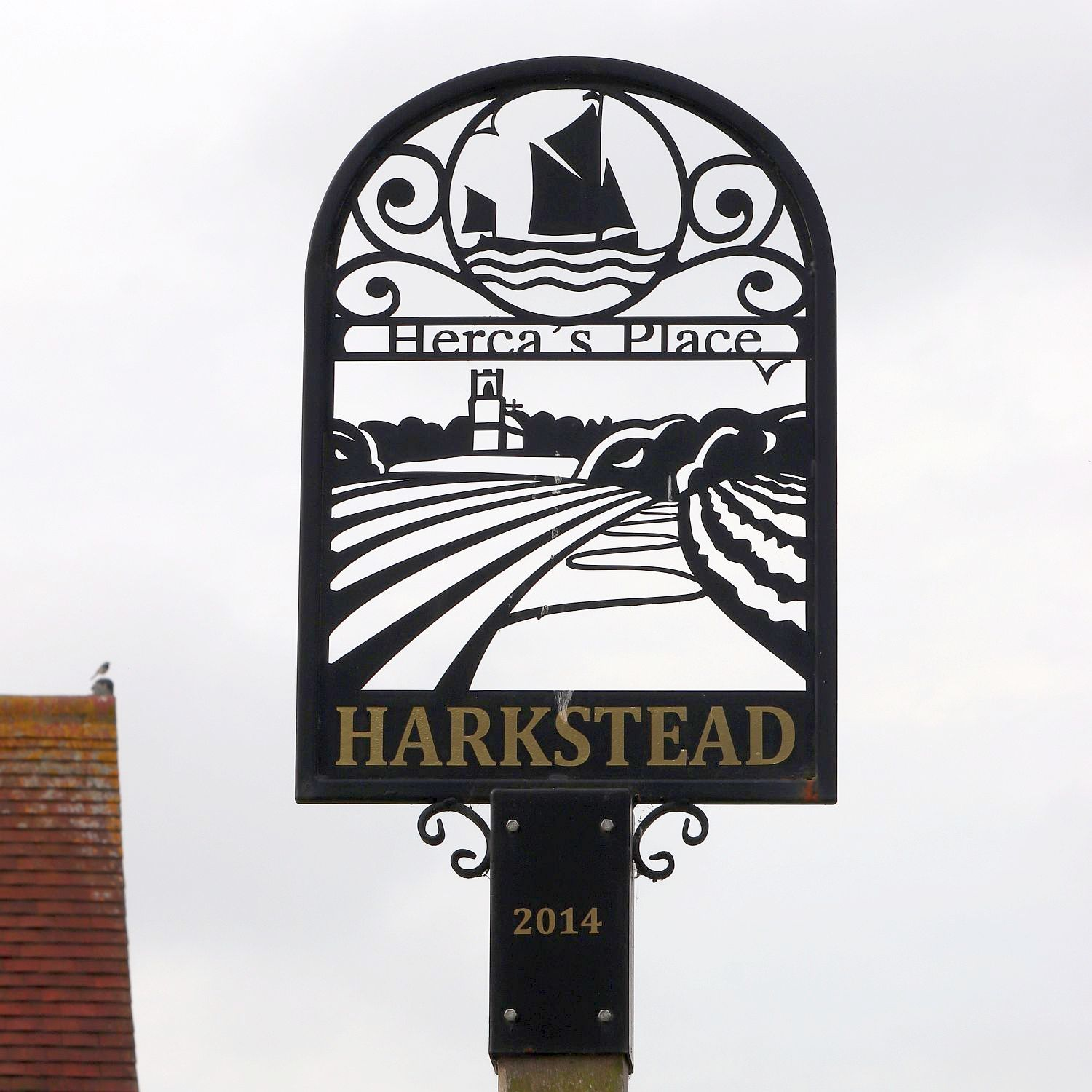
Harkstead Village Sign

Harkstead is a village and civil parish in the county of Suffolk, England. The village is located on the northern bank of the River Stour estuary at Holbrook Bay, and is situated on the Shotley peninsula, around 7 miles (11 km) south of Ipswich. It is part of Babergh local government district.

Most of the civil parish south of the road between the nearby villages of Lower Holbrook and Erwarton lies within the Suffolk Coast and Heaths Area of Outstanding Natural Beauty. The civil parish is bounded by the neighbouring civil parishes of Holbrook, Chelmondiston and Arwarton. Large areas of the civil parish are classified as Scheduled Monuments due to the presence of ring ditches, post-medieval field boundaries and later prehistoric or Roman field systems.
