= Holbrook Academy, Suffolk =

Holbrook Academy

Location
- Ipswich Road; Ipswich, Suffolk, IP9 2QX; England
- Coordinates: 51°59′20″N 1°09′24″E

Information
- Type: Academy
- Department for Education URN: 137208 Tables
- Ofsted: Reports
- Head Teacher: Claire Elliot
- Gender: Coeducational
- Age: 11 to 16
- Enrolment: 589
- Houses: Alton Deben Orwell Stour Gipping
- Colours: Green, Yellow, Blue, Red, Purple
- Website: http://holbrookacademy.org

Holbrook Academy is a secondary school with academy status located in the village of Holbrook, 5 miles (8 km) south of Ipswich in the English county of Suffolk. It currently has about 580 students aged 11–16.

The Holbrook Sports Centre is located on the school site. It was opened to the public on 20 January 2007 by Sally Kasnika (a former member of the English women's Basketball Team). The centre was built after the school received money from the Lottery Fund.

The headteacher Simon Letman died on the 13 April 2019. The interim Acting Headteacher was Nicola Mayhew. Tom Maltby was appointed as headteacher from September 2020.
