= Sir Arthur Lucas, 2nd Baronet =

English cricketer (1853-1915)

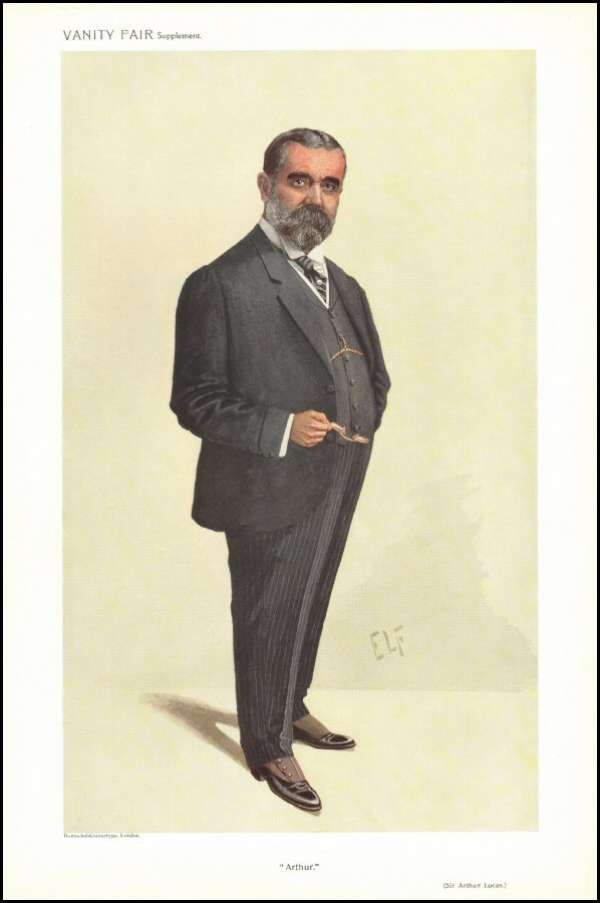
"Arthur". Caricature of Arthur Lucas by Elf published in Vanity Fair in 1909.

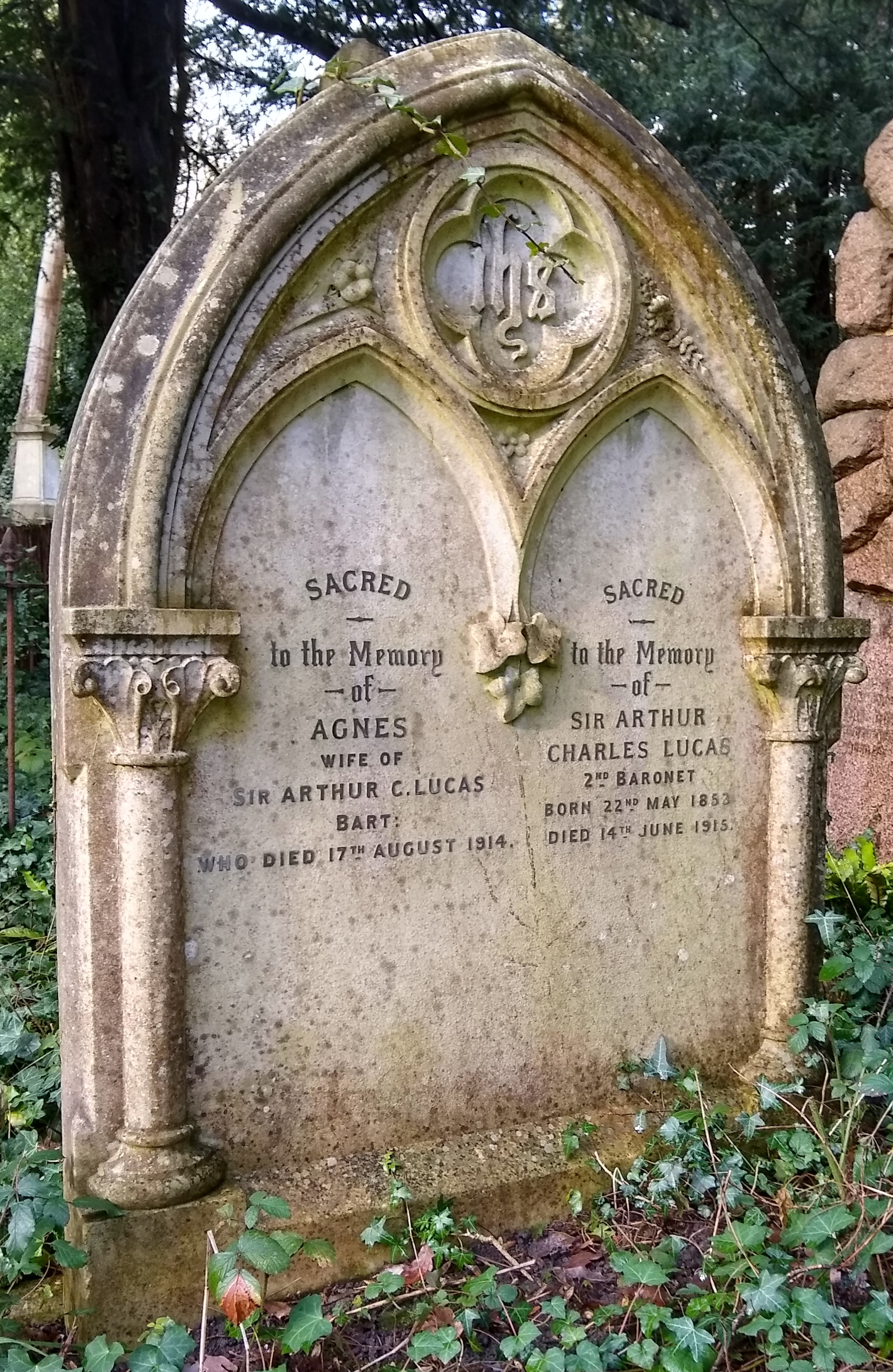
Grave of Sir Arthur Charles Lucas in Highgate Cemetery (west)

Sir Arthur Charles Lucas, 2nd Baronet (22 May 1853 – 14 June 1915) was an English first-class cricketer active 1871–81 who played for Middlesex and Surrey.

== Birth ==
He was born the son of Sir Thomas Lucas, 1st Baronet in Lowestoft, whom he succeeded in 1902.

== Career ==
He joined the British Army in the Engineering and Railway Volunteer Staff Corps, Royal Engineers, transferring as a Major to the regular Engineering and Railway Staff Corps in 1908. He was also a partner in the contract engineering firms of Lucas Brothers, Lucas and Aird, and John Aird and Company, and was actively associated with many of their major contracts, notably London Underground railways and docks, Hull and Barnsley railway and the Aswan Dam. He was additionally a director of the Hull and Barnsley Railway Company.

He served as a Justice of the Peace (JP) for both Middlesex and Suffolk.

== Personal life ==
He married Agnes Jamieson, daughter of George Jamieson, on 8 November 1876. They had no children and he was succeeded in the baronetcy by his younger brother Sir Thomas Lucas, 4th Baronet.

He died on 14 June 1915 in Marylebone and is buried at Highgate Cemetery.

Baronetage of the United Kingdom
Preceded by Thomas Lucas	Baronet (of Ashtead Park and Lowestoft); 1902–1915	Succeeded by Edward Lucas
