= Stutton, Suffolk =

Village in Suffolk, England

Coordinates: 51.971°N 1.129°E

Stutton
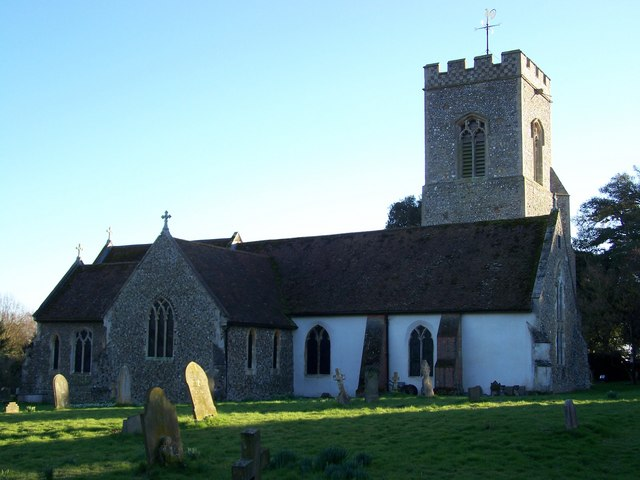
- Church of St Peter, Stutton

- Location within Suffolk
- Population: 812 (2011 census)
- District: Babergh
- Shire county: Suffolk
- Region: East
- Country: England
- Sovereign state: United Kingdom
- Post town: Ipswich
- Postcode district: IP9

Stutton is a small village and a civil parish approximately seven miles south of Ipswich in Suffolk, United Kingdom, on the Shotley peninsula. The village has two pubs, a community shop, a primary school, a village hall, a vets and a hair salon, an 18th-century period self-catering holiday cottage, bed and breakfast, and a holistic therapy centre. The village church of St. Peter's lies almost a mile from the village centre.

The village is home to Stutton Hall, a 16th-century Tudor house. Stutton Hall was built by Sir Edmund Jermy (Knight) c. 1550. The hall is a red-brick house composed of an older east wing and a newer west wing.

Stutton is surrounded by farming country. Close to the village lies Alton Water reservoir, popular for windsurfing and sailing, and about two miles east of Stutton in the neighbouring village of Holbrook is the Royal Hospital School.
