= Chelmondiston =

Village and civil parish in Suffolk, England

Coordinates: 51.98950°N 1.20861°E

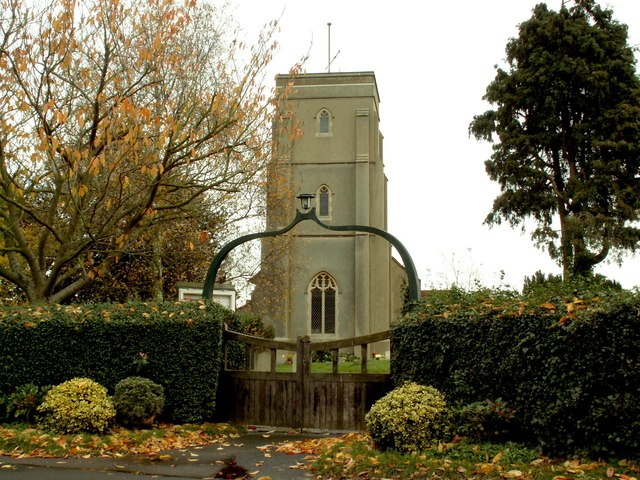
- St Andrew's Church, Chelmondiston

- Location within Suffolk
- Area: 5.17 km^{2} (2.00 sq mi)
- Population: 1,054 (2011)
  - Density: 204/km^{2} (530/sq mi)
- OS grid reference: TM204372
- District: Babergh
- Shire county: Suffolk
- Region: East
- Country: England
- Sovereign state: United Kingdom
- Post town: IPSWICH
- Postcode district: IP9
- Dialling code: 01473
- Police: Suffolk
- Fire: Suffolk
- Ambulance: East of England
- UK Parliament: South Suffolk

Chelmondiston is a small village and civil parish in Suffolk, England, located on the Shotley Peninsula, five miles south-east of Ipswich. The hamlet of Pin Mill lies within the parish on the south bank of the River Orwell. The village comprises approximately 500 dwellings and has a population of just over 1,000. It is one of the largest villages situated on the Shotley Peninsula.

== History ==
The etymology of the word Chelmondiston is perhaps ‘Ceolmund’s dwelling’. The parish contains a number of Bronze Age barrow sites. Chelmondiston and Pin Mill do not appear in the Domesday Book of 1086. It was formerly known as Chelmington and was located in the old hundred of Babergh.

== Churches ==
The original parish church of St. Andrew was described in 1865 as an "old, small, dilapidated edifice, with a square tower", and it was subsequently rebuilt by architect Edward Charles Hakewill. On 10 December 1944, during World War II, a flying bomb hit Hakewill's church and it was almost completely destroyed. In 1951, Basil Hatcher was commissioned to provide a replacement. The modern St. Andrew's church includes a set of stained glass windows made by Francis Skeat in the 1960s. There is also a Methodist church on the Main Road and a Baptist church on Pin Mill Road.

== Notable residents ==
- John Henley (1692–1756) clergyman, writer and poet, also known as 'Orator Henley' and noted for his showmanship and eccentricity.
- George Ratcliffe Woodward (1848–1934) Anglican priest, poet and musician.
- Princess Muna al-Hussein (born Antoinette Gardiner in 1941) wife of Hussein of Jordan.
