= Holbrook, Suffolk =

Village in Suffolk, England

Coordinates: 51.984°N 1.159°E

Holbrook
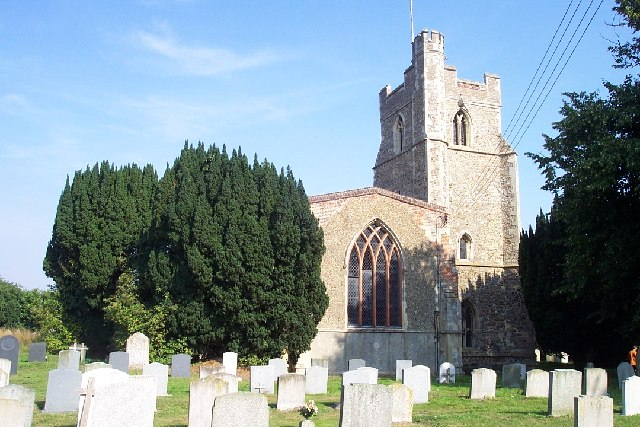
- All Saints' Church, Holbrook

- Location within Suffolk
- Population: 2,180 (2011)
- District: Babergh
- Shire county: Suffolk
- Region: East
- Country: England
- Sovereign state: United Kingdom
- Post town: Ipswich
- Postcode district: IP9

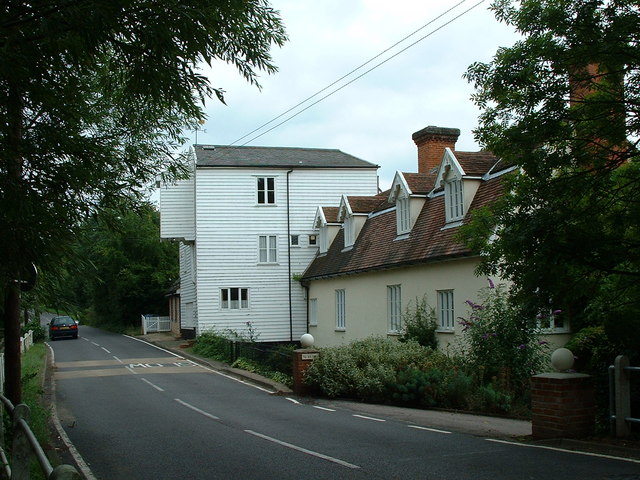
The old watermill

Holbrook is a village situated close to the northern shore of the estuary of the River Stour, in Suffolk, England. It is located on the Shotley Peninsula in Babergh district, around 5 miles (8 km) south of the centre of Ipswich.

To the south of the village is the Royal Hospital School, which moved to this site in 1933 after having been housed at Greenwich Hospital since 1693.

Lower Holbrook is a hamlet between the villages of Holbrook and Harkstead.

== Governance ==
An electoral ward of the same name exists. The population of this ward at the 2011 census was 2,467.

== Facilities ==
The village has one pub called the Swan (there was another pub called the Compasses but it closed during lockdown and never reopened), a Co-op store, a butcher, an art gallery, and a village hall. The area is served by a primary school and Holbrook Academy, which shares a site with the Dr Letman Sports Centre. The parish church, dedicated to All Saints, is a Grade II* listed building. The village also has Methodist church.

== History ==
During the Battle of Britain, a German military aircraft crashed into a field on the outskirts of the village. Contemporary newspaper accounts identified the aircraft as a Messerschmitt. Another account possibly shows it crashed into Holbrook Bay instead.

== Notable people ==
- Frederick Fryer (1849-1917), first-class cricketer, was born in the village.
- Griff Rhys Jones Welsh actor, comedian, writer and television presenter and his wife Jo Jones also own a house in Holbrook.
