= Listed buildings in Lindsey, Suffolk =

Civil Parish in Suffolk, England

Lindsey is a village and civil parish in the Babergh District of Suffolk, England. It contains 24 listed buildings that are recorded in the National Heritage List for England. Of these two are grade I and 22 are grade II.

This list is based on the information retrieved online from Historic England.

== Key ==
Grade	Criteria
I	Buildings that are of exceptional interest
II*	Particularly important buildings of more than special interest
II	Buildings that are of special interest

== Listing ==
Name	Grade	Location	Type	Completed (Note: The date given is the date used by Historic England as significant for the initial building or that of an important part in the structure's description.)	Date designated	Grid ref. (Note: The grid reference is based on the British national grid reference system, sometimes known as OSGB36, used by the Ordnance Survey.) Geo-coordinates	Notes	Entry number (Note: The "List Entry Number" is a unique number assigned to each listed building and scheduled monument by Historic England.)	Image	Wikidata
Barn to the North of Raven's Hall	II				10 July 1980	TL9887746054; 52°04′38″N 0°54′03″E		1284812	Upload Photo	Q26573553
Raven's Hall	II				10 July 1980	TL9887546029; 52°04′37″N 0°54′03″E		1351554	Upload Photo	Q26634644
Falcon Hall	II	Chelsworth Road, Lindsey Tye			10 July 1980	TL9827445959; 52°04′35″N 0°53′31″E		1181856	Upload Photo	Q26477145
Rose Cottage	II	Chelsworth Road, Lindsey Tye			10 July 1980	TL9826745709; 52°04′27″N 0°53′30″E		1037146	Upload Photo	Q26288843
Swallow's Farmhouse	II	Chelsworth Road, Lindsey Tye			23 January 1958	TL9826746014; 52°04′37″N 0°53′31″E		1037147	Upload Photo	Q26288844
Tye Cottage	II	Chelsworth Road, Lindsey Tye			10 July 1980	TL9827345811; 52°04′31″N 0°53′30″E		1181850	Upload Photo	Q26477140
Church of St Peter	I	Church Road	church building		23 January 1958	TL9778744931; 52°04′03″N 0°53′03″E		1284818	Church of St Peter More images	Q17542325
Chapel of St James	I	Kersey Road, Rose Green	church building		23 January 1958	TL9778944378; 52°03′45″N 0°53′02″E		1351517	Chapel of St James More images	Q7593420
Gooseberry	II	Lindsey Tye			10 July 1980	TL9812545649; 52°04′25″N 0°53′22″E		1181868	Upload Photo	Q26477155
Ivydene	II	Lindsey Tye			10 July 1980	TL9818545583; 52°04′23″N 0°53′25″E		1351516	Upload Photo	Q17542434
Chapel Farmhouse	II	Rose Green			3 February 1975	TL9776444384; 52°03′45″N 0°53′01″E		1181886	Upload Photo	Q26477171
White Rose Inn	II	Rose Green			10 July 1980	TL9727444403; 52°03′46″N 0°52′35″E		1037148	Upload Photo	Q26288845
Barn Approximately 40 Metres South of Rose Green Cottage	II	Rose Green Road, Ipswich, IP7 6PX, Rose Green			10 July 1980	TL9722044288; 52°03′43″N 0°52′32″E		1181878	Upload Photo	Q26477163
Rose Green Cottage	II	Rose Green Road, Ipswich, IP7 6PX, Rose Green			10 July 1980	TL9721744331; 52°03′44″N 0°52′32″E		1037149	Upload Photo	Q26288846
Barn to East of Folly Farmhouse	II	Saddlers Nap Road			10 July 1980	TL9675044520; 52°03′51″N 0°52′08″E		1351538	Upload Photo	Q26634628
Folly Farmhouse	II	Saddlers Nap Road			10 July 1980	TL9670744521; 52°03′51″N 0°52′06″E		1037150	Upload Photo	Q26288847
Cob	II	The Street			10 July 1980	TL9753144793; 52°03′59″N 0°52′49″E		1351539	Upload Photo	Q26634629
Elm Cottage	II	The Street			10 July 1980	TL9783645105; 52°04′08″N 0°53′06″E		1037110	Upload Photo	Q26288808
Hill Farm Cottages	II	The Street			10 July 1980	TL9779145109; 52°04′08″N 0°53′04″E		1351540	Upload Photo	Q26634630
Hill Farmhouse	II	The Street			10 July 1980	TL9776845065; 52°04′07″N 0°53′02″E		1037109	Upload Photo	Q26288807
Monks	II	The Street			10 July 1980	TL9773744990; 52°04′05″N 0°53′01″E		1037108	Upload Photo	Q26288806
Rose Green Farmhouse	II	The Street			10 July 1980	TL9735844593; 52°03′52″N 0°52′40″E		1037107	Upload Photo	Q26288805
Valley House	II	The Street			10 July 1980	TL9789145201; 52°04′11″N 0°53′09″E		1351541	Upload Photo	Q26634631
Tudor Cottage	II	The Tye, Ipswich, IP7 6PP, Lindsey Tye			10 July 1980	TL9826545815; 52°04′31″N 0°53′30″E		1351515	Upload Photo	Q26634612

== See also ==
- Grade I listed buildings in Suffolk
- Grade II* listed buildings in Suffolk

== Sources ==
- Bettely, James; Pevsner, Nikolaus (2015) [1961], Suffolk: West, The Buildings of England, New Haven and London: Yale University Press, ISBN 978-0-300-19655-9
