= Sidi Megdoul =

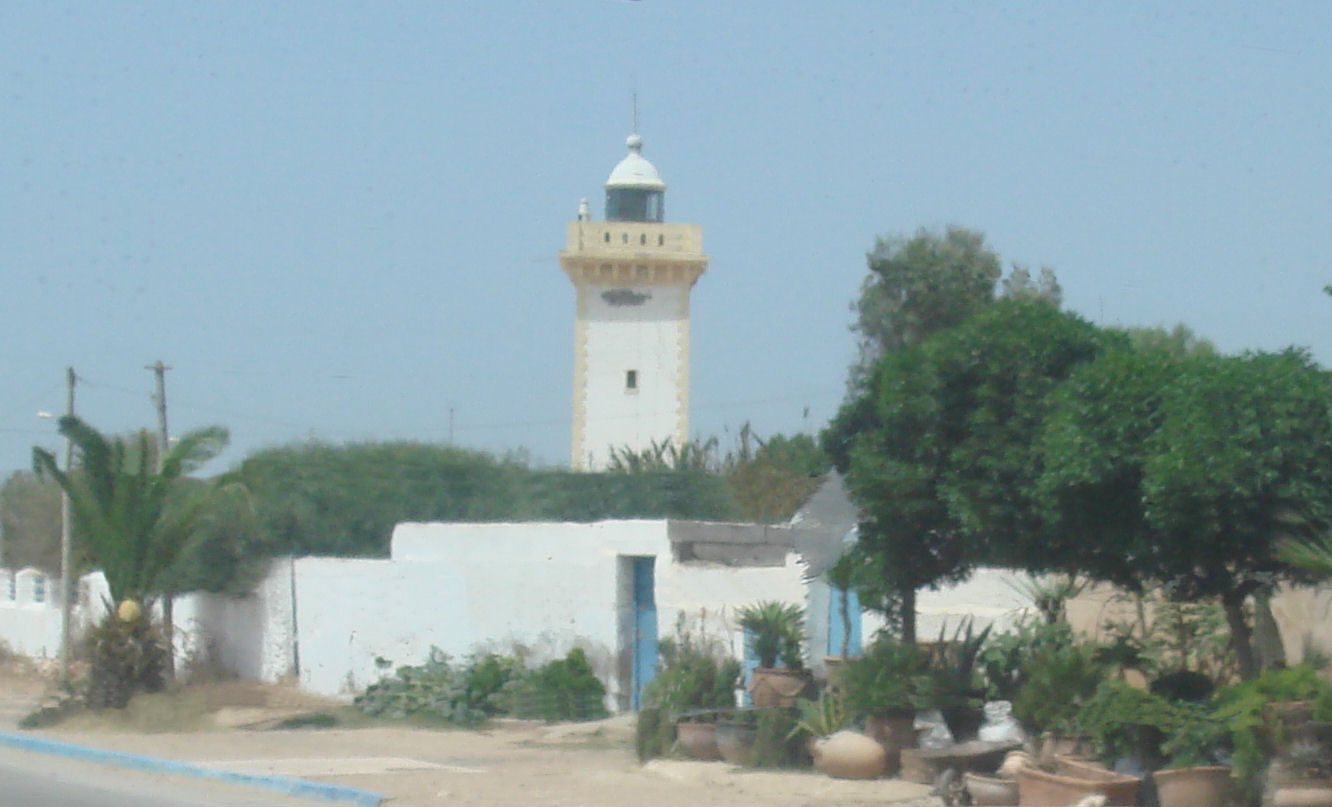
Resting place of Sidi Mogdul in Essaouira, with the Sidi Mogdoul lighthouse.

Sidi Mogdoul was a Moroccan Wali and religious leader who lived in the 11th century. He was buried in Essaouira.

Sidi Megdoul came from the noble Berber tribe of Regraga, and was credited with renewing the Ribat of Sidi Chiker. From his base in Essaouira, he fought the Berghwata confederacy and later allied with the Almoravids and participated in the propagation of their Da'wa.

The saint also gave his name to the nearby lighthouse, 17 meter high, named the Sidi Mogdoul lighthouse.
