= André Jodin =

André Jodin is an archaeologist known for explorations and excavations in North Africa, especially in Morocco. André Jodin (1921-2003) studied Phoenician and Punic sites in Morocco in the 1960s and 1970s. Mogador (Essaouira) (Kerné?) became then the most extreme place of Phoenician merchants in the South Atlantic African coast. His contribution to Volubilis (Muley Idris) followed Carcopino’s thesis about the regia of king Juba II (25 BP-23 AD) in Morocco. In the 1980s André Jodin participated in the archaeological study of the Iberian necropolis of Cabezo Lucero (Guardamar del Segura, Alicante). References: -A. Jodin: Mogador. Comptoir phénicien du Maroc atlantique, Rabat, 1966. -A. Jodin: Volubilis Regia Iubae, Paris, 1987. -A. Jodin et al.: La nécropole ibérique de Cabezo Lucero (Guardamar del Segunra, Alicante), Madrid, 1993.

Jodin – who typically signed his publications as A. Jodin – directed excavations at a number of significant sites, including Volubilis in north-east Morocco, and Mogador on Morocco's Atlantic coast.^{cf.}
