= Essaouira =

Essaouira الصويرة ⵜⴰⵚⵚⵓⵔⵜ
- City
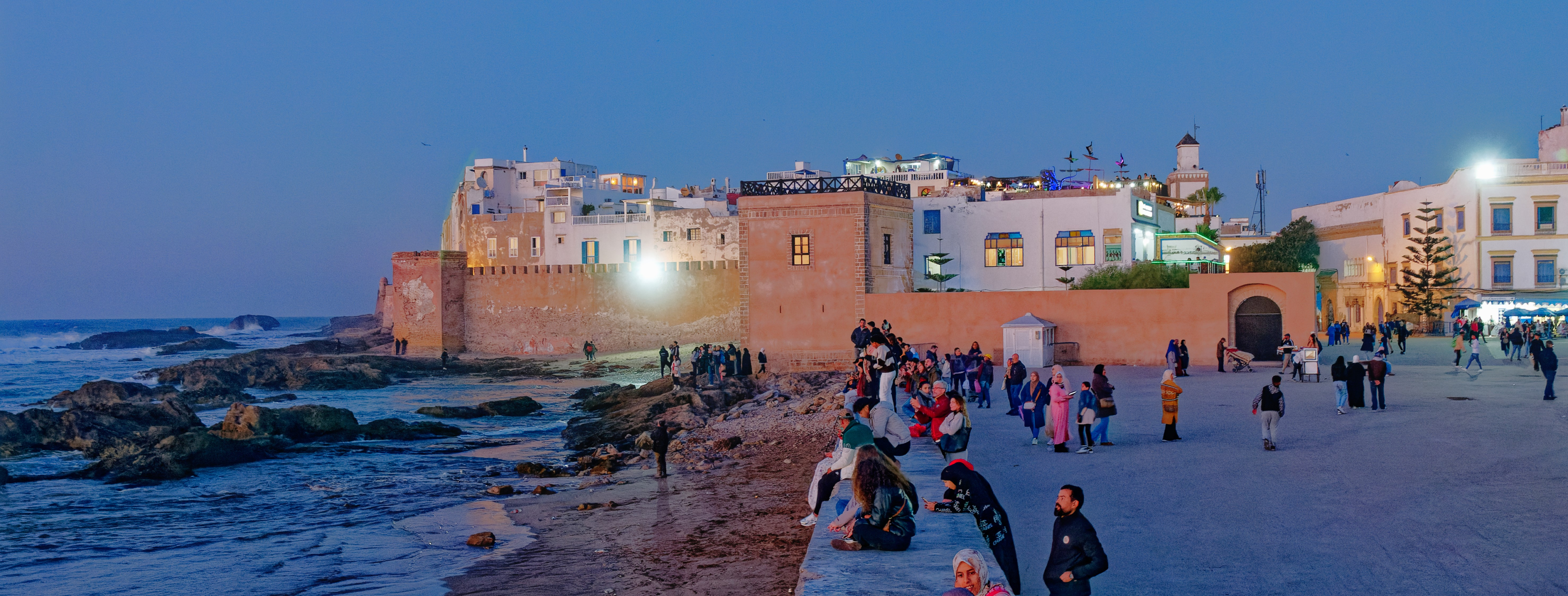
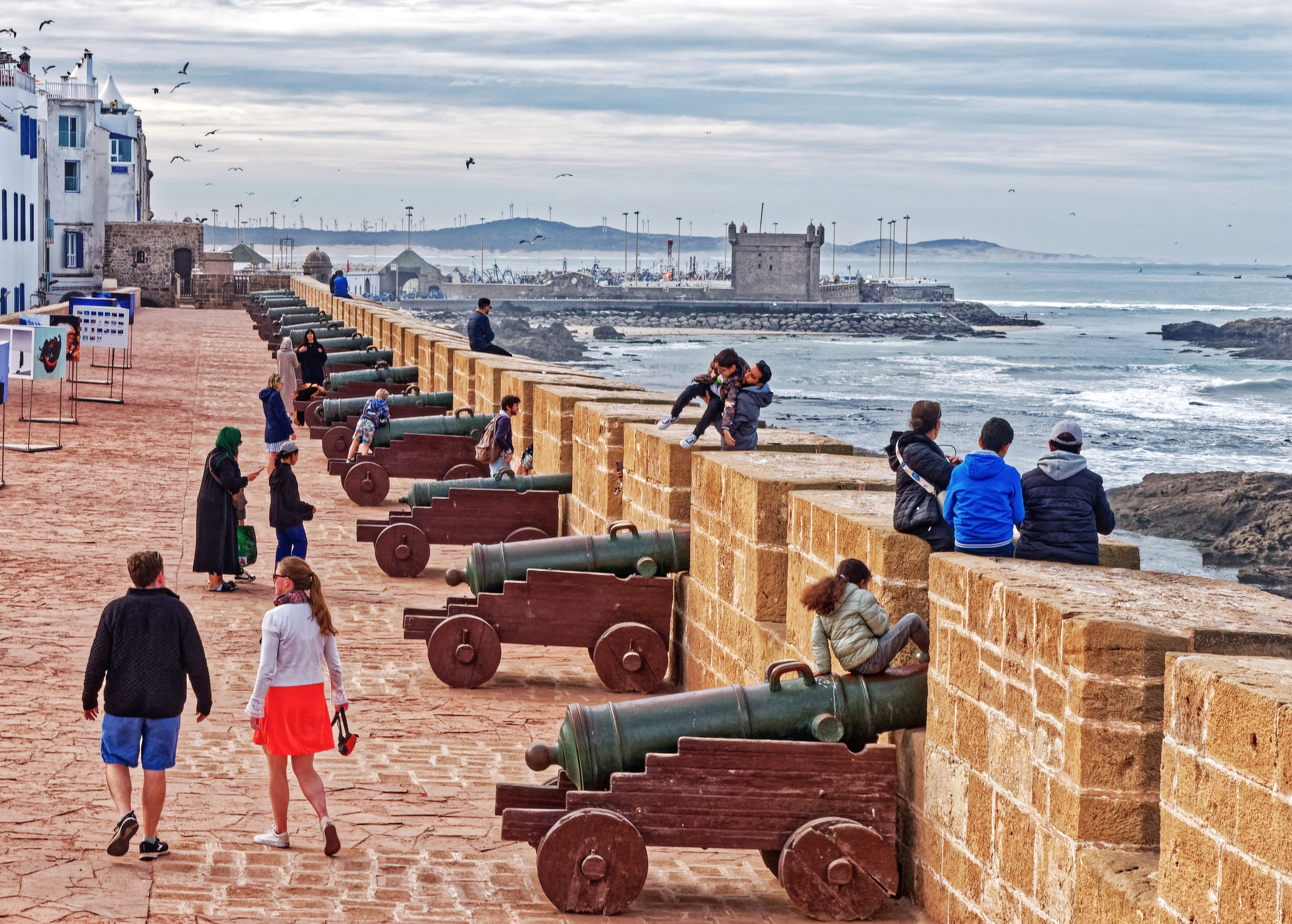
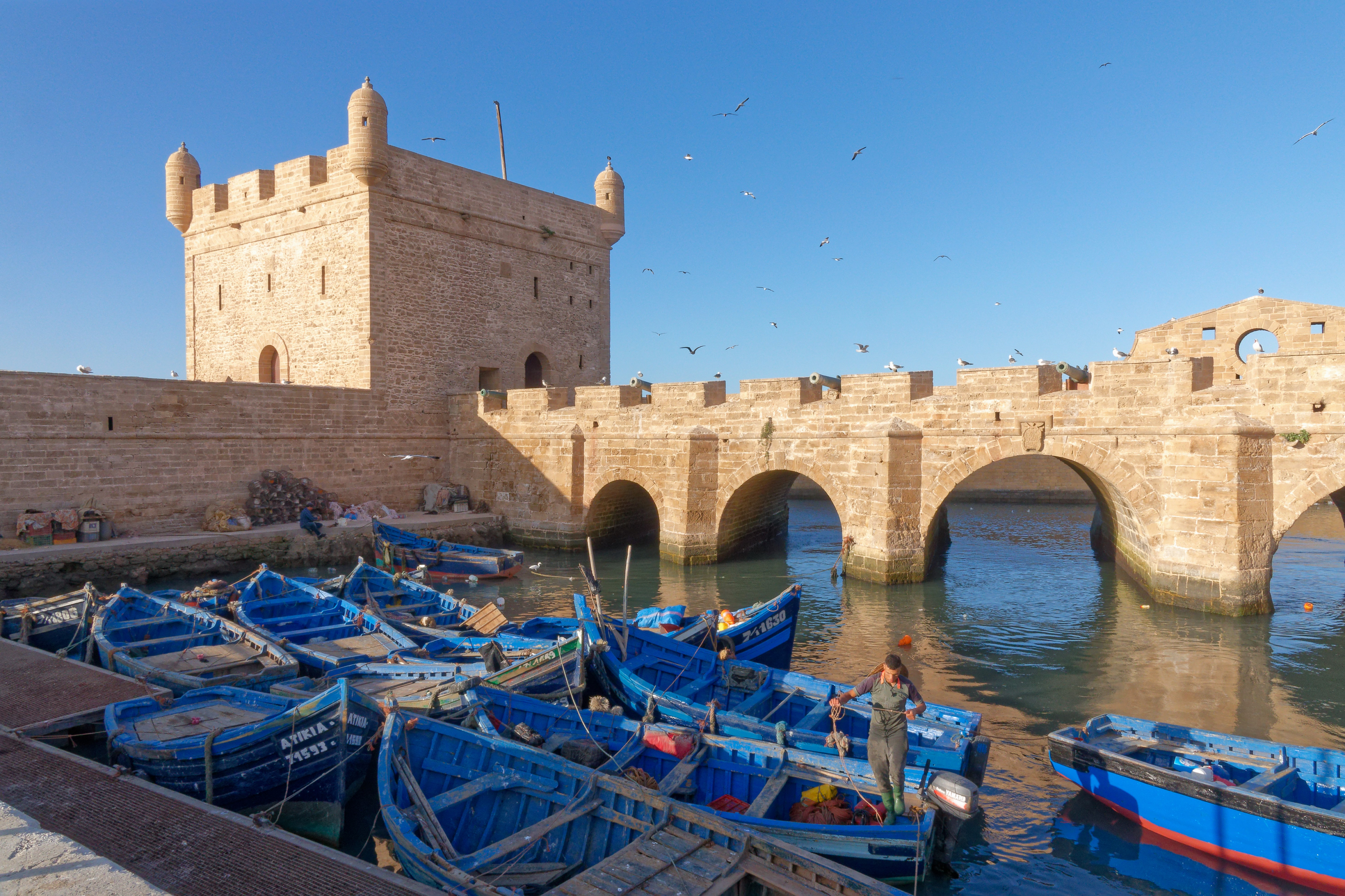
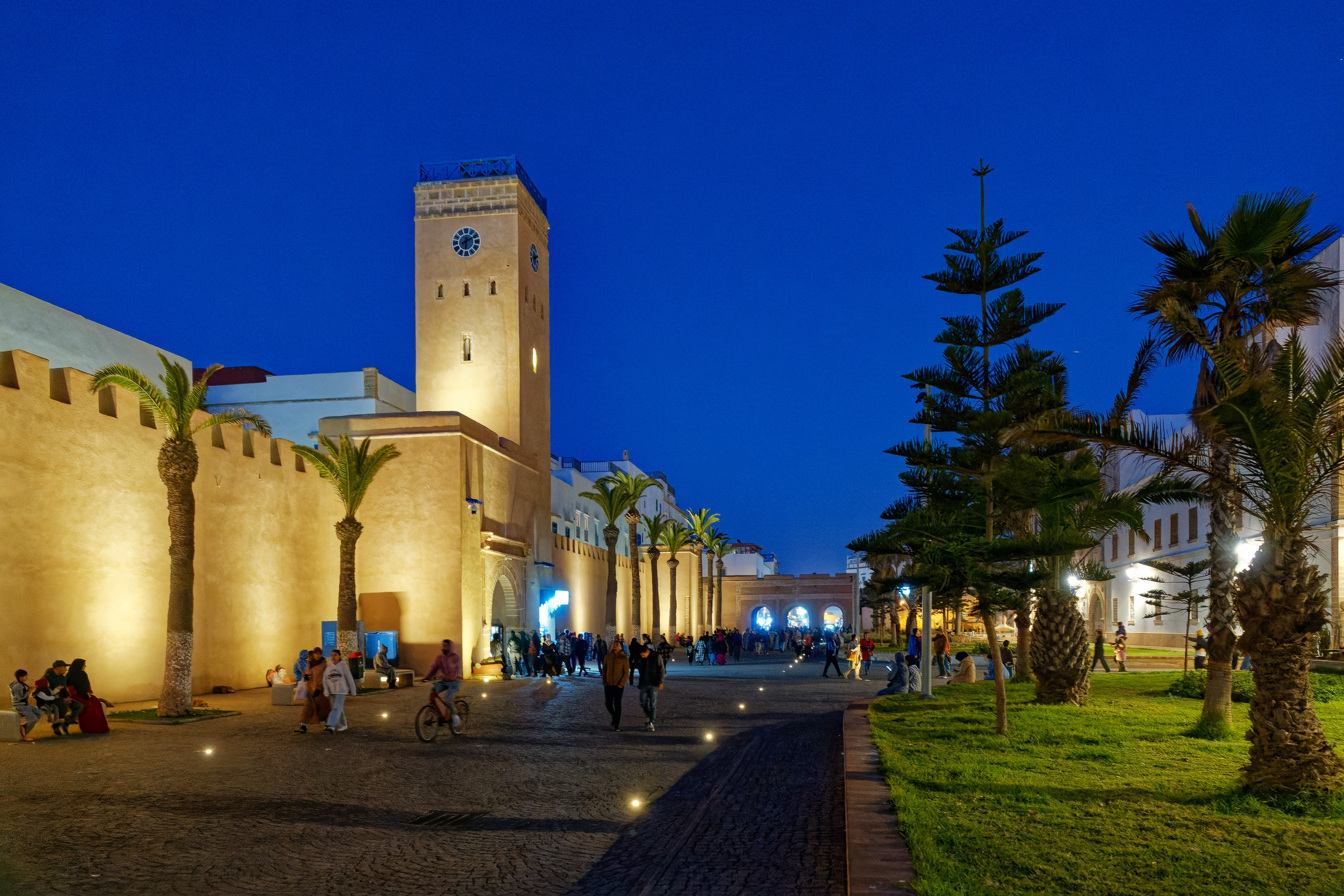
- Clockwise from top: Essaouira skyline, The Citadel by Scala harbour, Magana clocktower, cannons by the City wall

- Coat of arms
- Interactive map of Essaouira
- Coordinates: 31°30′47″N 9°46′11″W
- Country: Morocco
- Region: Marrakesh-Safi
- Province: Essaouira
- Founded: 1769
- Founder: Mohammed III

Government
  - Mayor: Tarik Ottmani (RNI)

Area
  - Total: 130.5 km^{2} (50.4 sq mi)
- Highest elevation: 50 m (160 ft)
- Lowest elevation: 0 m (0 ft)

Population (2024)
  - Total: 82,962
- Time zone: UTC+0 (GMT)

UNESCO World Heritage Site
- Official name: Medina of Essaouira (formerly Mogador)
- Criteria: Cultural: ii, iv
- Reference: 753
- Inscription: 2001 (25th Session)
- Area: 30 ha (74 acres)
- Buffer zone: 15 ha (37 acres)

Essaouira (/ˌɛsəˈwɪərə/ ESS-ə-WEER-ə; Arabic: الصويرة, romanized: aṣ-Ṣawīra, Standard Moroccan Tamazight: ⵜⴰⵚⵚⵓⵔⵜ, romanized: taṣṣurt), known until the 1960s as Mogador (Arabic: موغادور, romanized: Mūghādūr, or موݣادور, Mūgādūr), is a port city on the Atlantic coast in western Morocco. It has 82,962 inhabitants as of 2024.

The foundation of the city of Essaouira was the work of the Moroccan 'Alawid sultan Mohammed bin Abdallah, who made an original experiment by entrusting it to several architects in 1760, in particular Théodore Cornut and Ahmed al-Inglizi, who designed the city using French captives from the failed French expedition to Larache in 1765, and with the mission of building a city adapted to the needs of foreign merchants. Once built, it continued to grow and experienced a golden age and exceptional development, becoming the country's most important commercial port but also its diplomatic capital between the end of the 18th century and the first half of the 19th century.

The Medina of Essaouira was designated by the UNESCO a World Heritage Site in 2001.

== Name and etymology ==
The name of the city is usually spelled Essaouira in Latin script, and الصويرة in Arabic script. Both spellings represent its name in Moroccan Arabic, aṣ-Ṣwiṛa. This is the diminutive (with definite article) of the noun ṣuṛ which means "wall (as round a yard, city), rampart". The pronunciation with pharyngealized /sˁ/ and /rˁ/ is a typically Moroccan development. In Classical Arabic, the noun is sūr (سور, with plain /s/ and /r/), diminutive suwayrah (سويرة); this is the only form cited in all dictionaries of Classical Arabic. Hence, the spelling of the name in Arabic script according to the classical pronunciation is السويرة as-Suwayrah (with sīn not ṣād).

Until the 1960s, Essaouira was generally known by its Portuguese name, Mogador. This name is probably a corruption of Amegdul (Arabic: أمقدول, romanized: Ameqdūl), which was mentioned by the 11th-century geographer al-Bakrī. The name Mogador originated from the Phoenician word Migdol, meaning 'small fortress'.

== History ==
Archaeological research shows that Essaouira has been occupied since prehistoric times. The bay at Essaouira is partially sheltered by the island of Mogador, making it a peaceful harbor protected against strong marine winds.

=== Antiquity ===
Essaouira has long been considered one of the best anchorages of the Moroccan coast. The Carthaginian navigator Hanno visited in the 5th century BCE and established the trading post of Arambys.

Around the end of the 1st century BCE or early 1st century CE, the Berber king of Mauretania Juba II established a Tyrian purple factory, processing the murex and purpura shells found in the intertidal rocks at Essaouira and the Iles Purpuraires. This dye colored the purple stripe in the togas worn by the Senators of Imperial Rome.

A Roman villa was excavated on Mogador island. A Roman vase was found as well as coinage from the 3rd century CE. Most of the artifacts are now visible in the Sidi Mohammed ben Abdallah Museum and the Rabat Archaeological Museum.

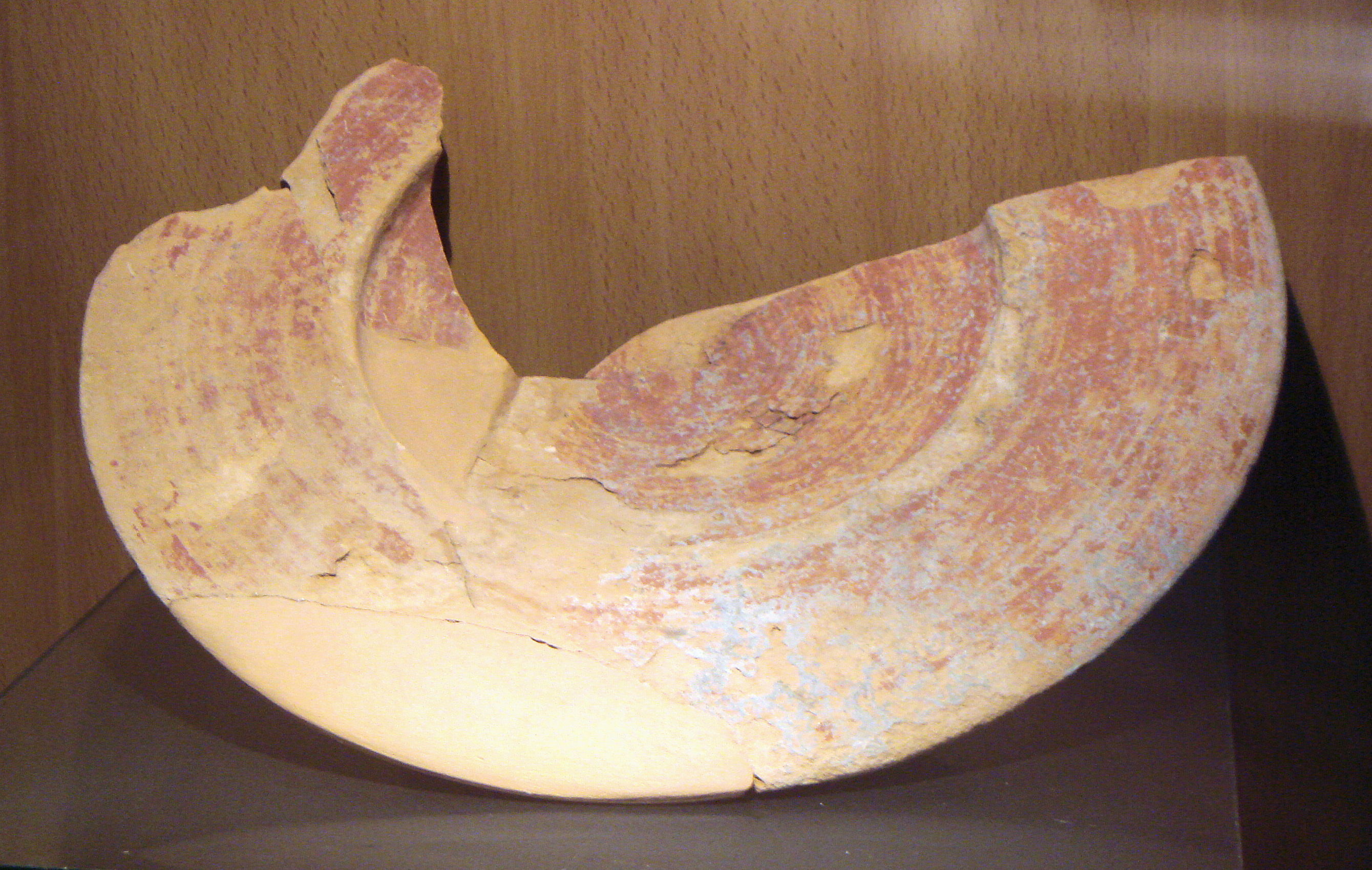
Phoenician plate with red slip, 7th century BCE, excavated in Mogador island, Essaouira. Sidi Mohammed ben Abdallah Museum.

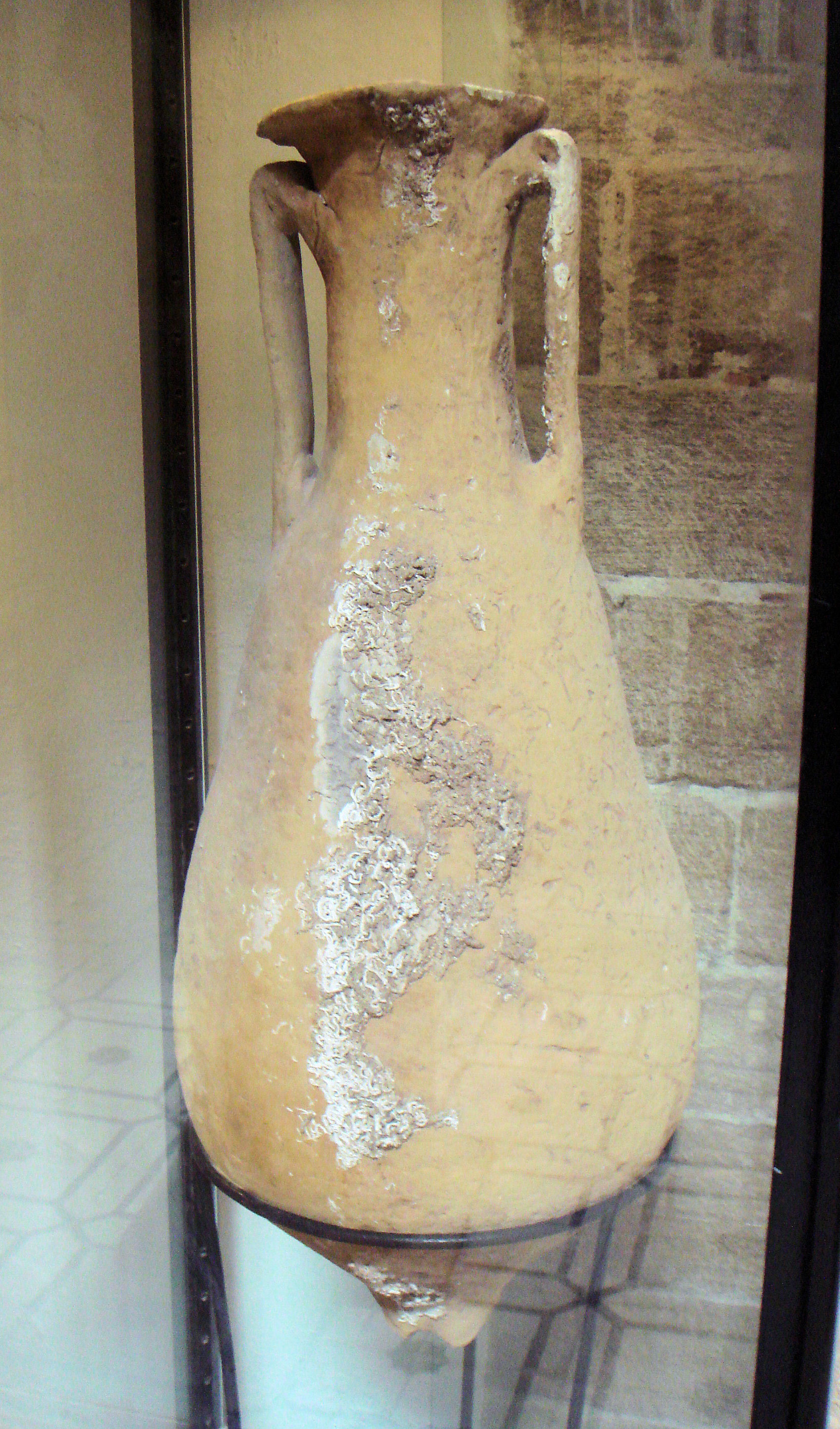
Betica amphora found in Essaouira, 1st–2nd century CE

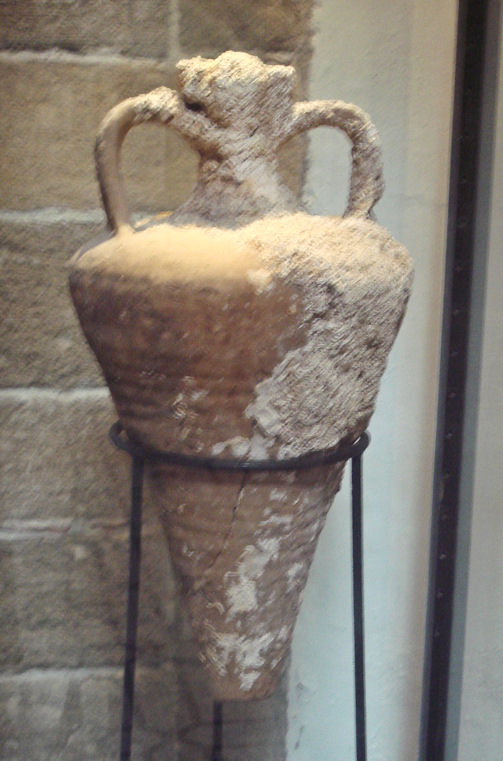
Aegean amphora found in Essaouira, 3rd–4th century CE

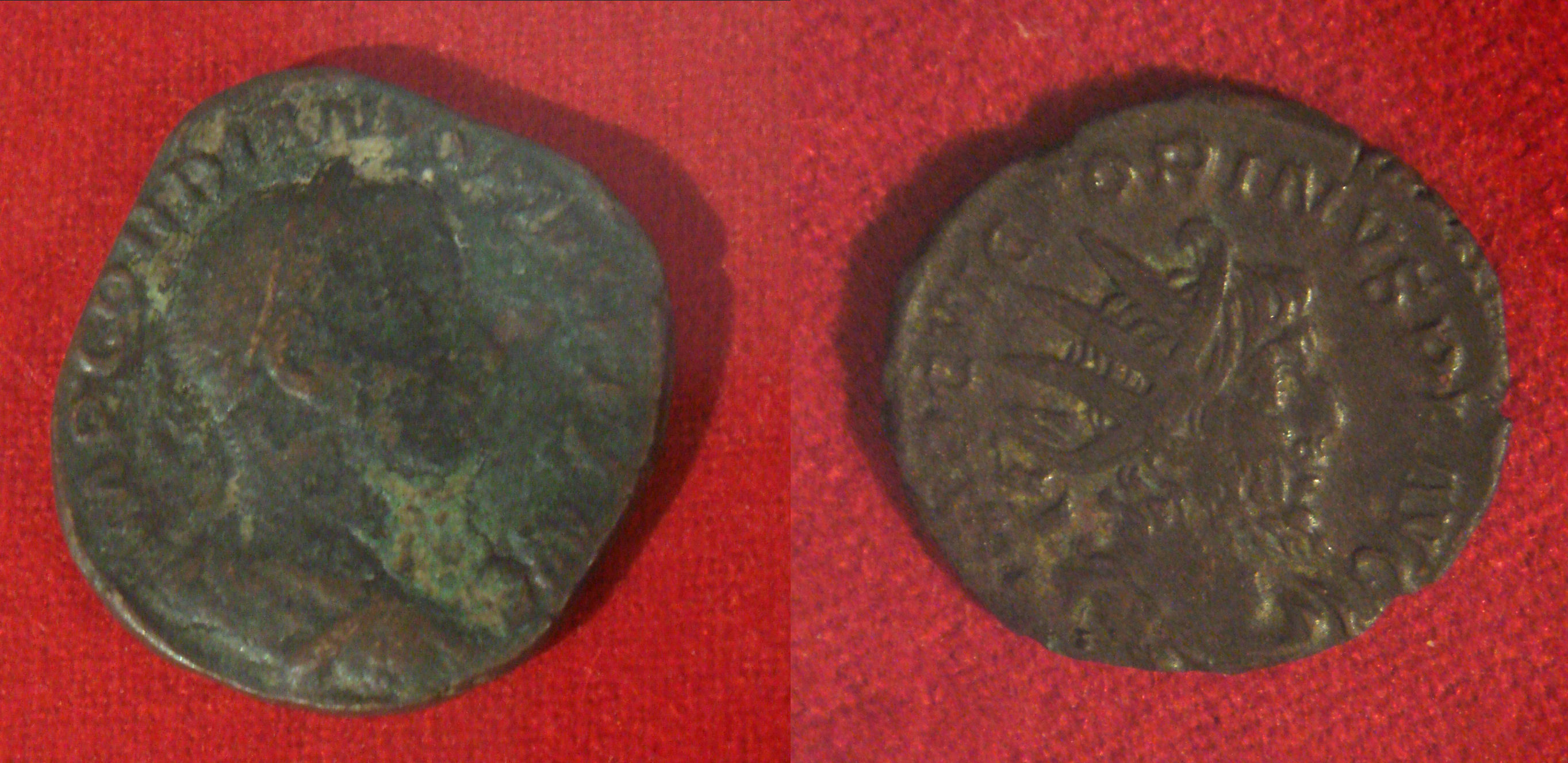
Roman coins excavated in Essaouira, 3rd century.

=== Early modern period ===
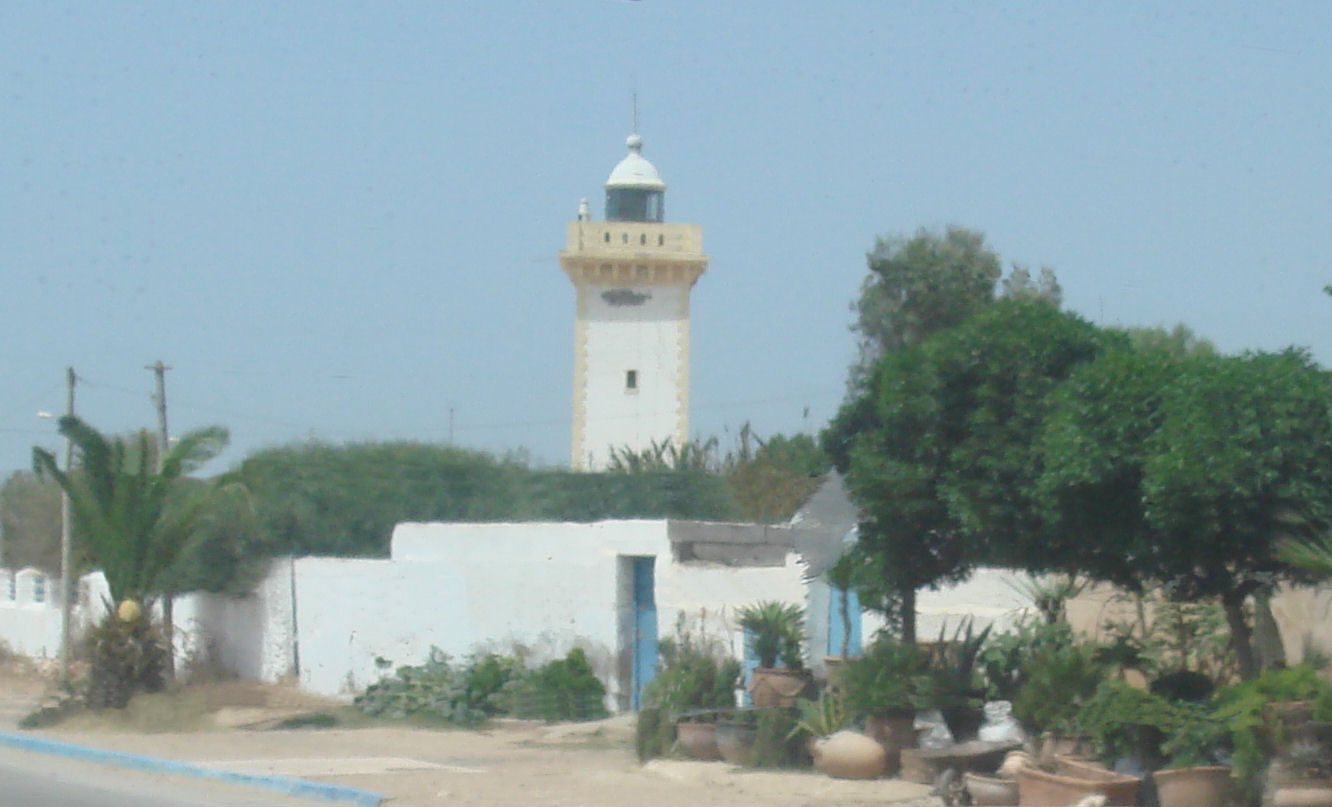
Resting place of Sidi Mogdoul in Essaouira.

During the Middle Ages, a Muslim saint named Sidi Mogdoul was buried in Essaouira, probably giving its origin to the name "Mogador".

==== Portuguese establishment (1506–1510) ====
In 1506, the king of Portugal, D. Manuel I, ordered a fortress to be built there, named Castelo Real de Mogador. Altogether, the Portuguese are documented to have seized six Moroccan towns and built six stand-alone fortresses on the Moroccan Atlantic coast, between the river Loukos in the north and the river of Sous in the south. Four of them only had a short duration: Graciosa (1489), São João da Mamora (1515), Castelo Real of Mogador (1506–1510) and Aguz (1520–1525). Two became permanent urban settlements: Santa Cruz do Cabo de Gué (modern Agadir, founded in 1505–06), and Mazagan, founded in 1514–1517. Following the 1541 Fall of Agadir, the Portuguese had to abandon most of their settlements between 1541 and 1550, although they were able to keep Ceuta, Tangier and Mazagan.

The fortress of Castelo Real of Mogador fell to the local resistance of the Regraga fraternity four years after its establishment, in 1510.

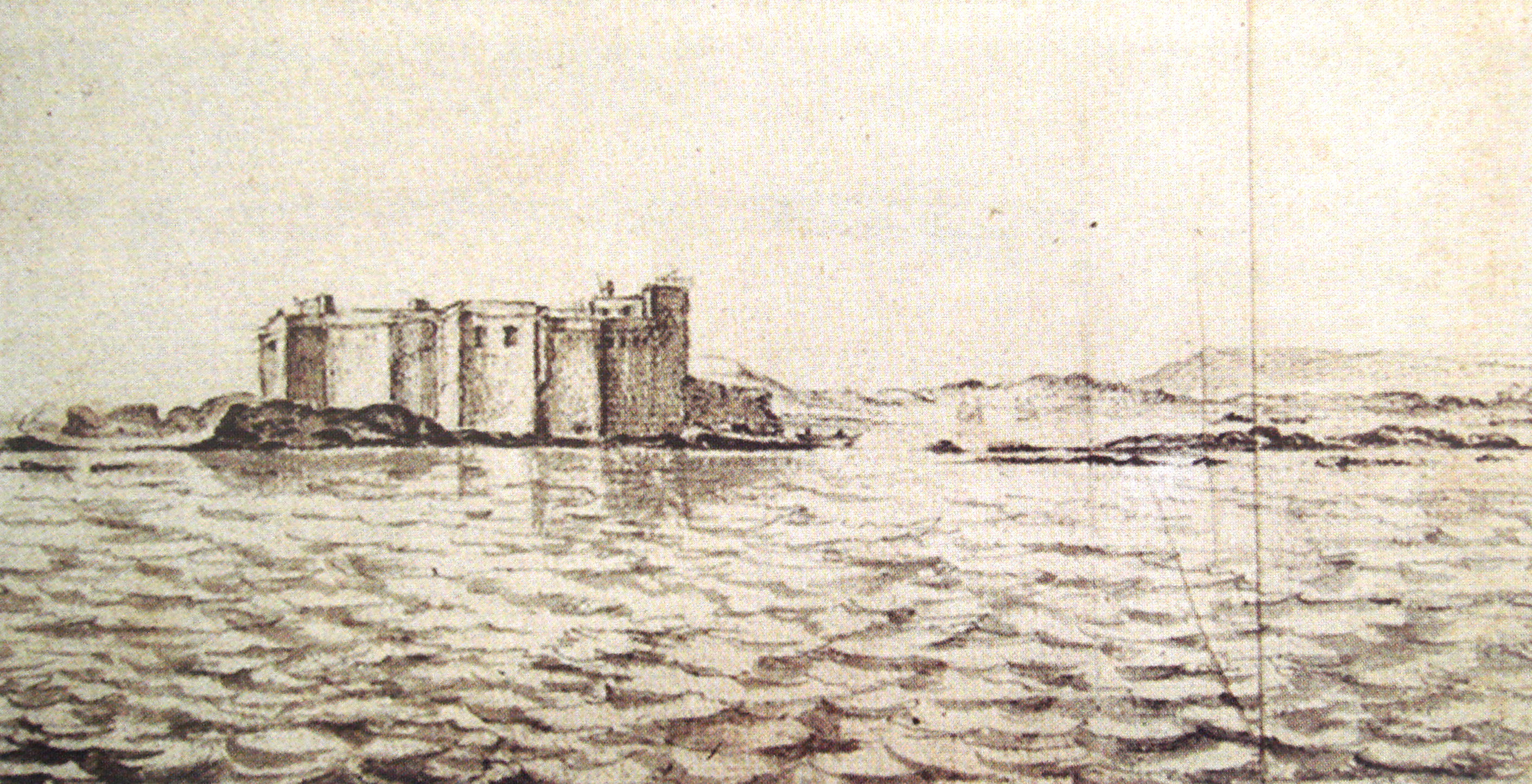
The Portuguese-built Castelo Real of Mogador was defended under Abd el-Malek II by a garrison of 100 Moroccans. It was drawn by Adriaen Matham in 1641.

During the 16th century, powers including Spain, England, the Netherlands and France tried in vain to conquer the locality. Essaouira remained a haven for the export of sugar and molasses and as an anchorage for pirates.

==== De Razilly expedition (1629) ====
France was involved in an early attempt to colonize Mogador in 1629. As Richelieu and Père Joseph were attempting to establish a colonial policy, Admiral Isaac de Razilly suggested they occupy Mogador in 1626, which he had reconnoitered in 1619. The objective was to create a base against the Sultan of Morocco and asphyxiate the harbour of Safi.

He departed for Salé on 20 July 1629 with a fleet composed of the ships Licorne, Saint-Louis, Griffon, Catherine, Hambourg, Sainte-Anne, Saint-Jean. He bombarded the city of Salé, destroyed three corsair ships, and then sent the Griffon under Captain Treillebois to Mogador. The men of Razilly saw the fortress of Castelo Real in Mogador and landed 100 men with wood and supplies on Mogador island, with the agreement of Richelieu. After a few days, however, the Griffon reembarked the colonists and departed to rejoin the fleet in Salé.

After these expeditions, France signed a treaty with Abd el-Malek II in 1631, giving France preferential treatment, known as "capitulations": preferential tariffs, the establishment of a Consulate, and freedom of religion for French subjects.

=== Foundation of modern Essaouira (1760–1770) ===
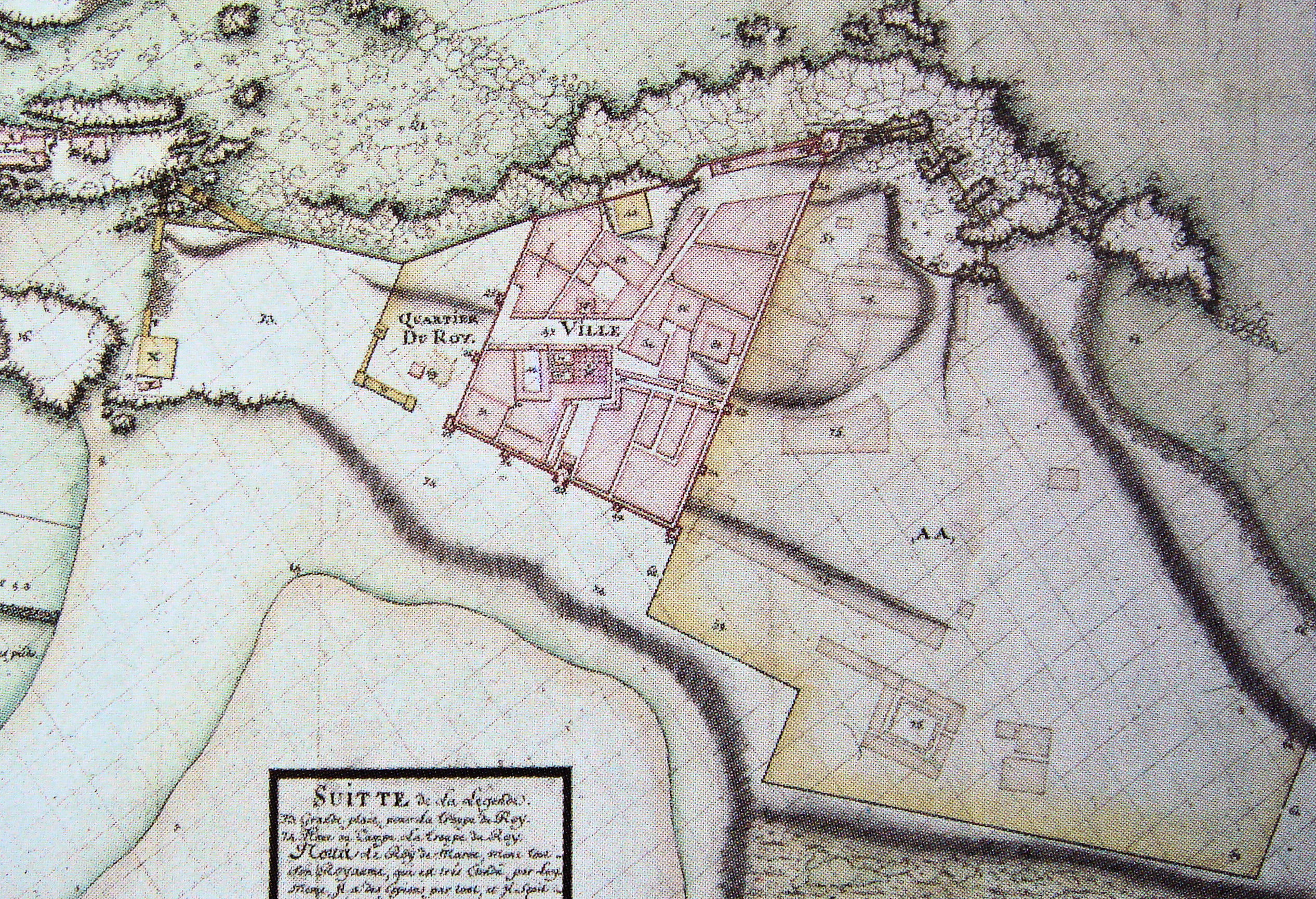
Map of Essaouira by Théodore Cornut. When he left in 1767, areas in pink were already built (streets are still recognizable); areas in yellow (harbour front and medina) were only projected.

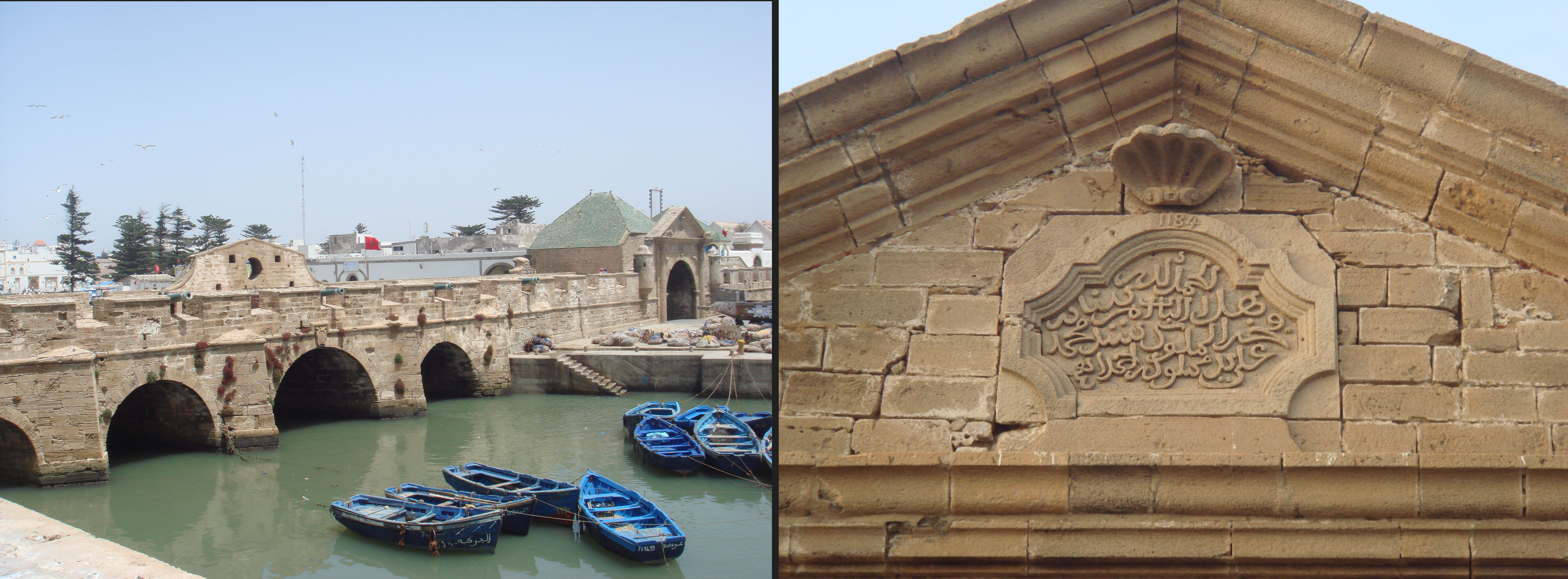
Harbour fortifications were built by an English renegade named Ahmed El Alj in 1770, as described in the sculptured inscription in Arabic (right).

The present city of Essaouira was built during the mid-eighteenth century by the Moroccan King. Mohammed III tried to reorient his kingdom toward the Atlantic for increased exchanges with European powers, choosing Mogador as his key location. One of his objectives was to establish a harbour at the closest possible point to Marrakesh. The other was to cut off trade from Agadir in the south, which had been favouring a political rival of Mohammed III, and the inhabitants of Agadir were forced to relocate to Essaouira.

For 12 years, Mohammed III directed a French engineer, Théodore Cornut, and several other Moroccan and European architects and technicians to build the fortress and city along modern lines. Originally called "Souira" ("the small fortress"), the name became "Es-Saouira" ("the beautifully designed").

Thédore Cornut designed and built the city itself, particularly the Kasbah area, corresponding to the royal quarters and the buildings for Christian merchants and diplomats. Other parts were built by other architects, including Moroccan architects especially from Fez, Marrakesh, and Rabat. The harbour entrance, with the "Porte de la Marine", was built by an English renegade by the name of Ahmed el Inglizi ("Ahmed the English") or Ahmed El Alj ("Ahmed the Renegade"). Mohammed III took numerous steps to encourage the development of Essaouira including closing off the harbour of Agadir to the south in 1767 so that southern trade could be redirected through Essaouira. European communities in the northern harbour of Rabat-Salé were ordered to move to Essaouira through an ordinance of 21 January 1765.

From the time of its rebuilding by Muhammad III until the end of the nineteenth century, Essaouira served as Morocco's principal port, offering the goods of the caravan trade to the world. The route brought goods from sub-Saharan Africa to Timbuktu, then through the desert and over the Atlas Mountains to Marrakesh. The road from Marrakesh to Essaouira is a straight line, explaining the king's choice of this port among the many others along the Moroccan coast.

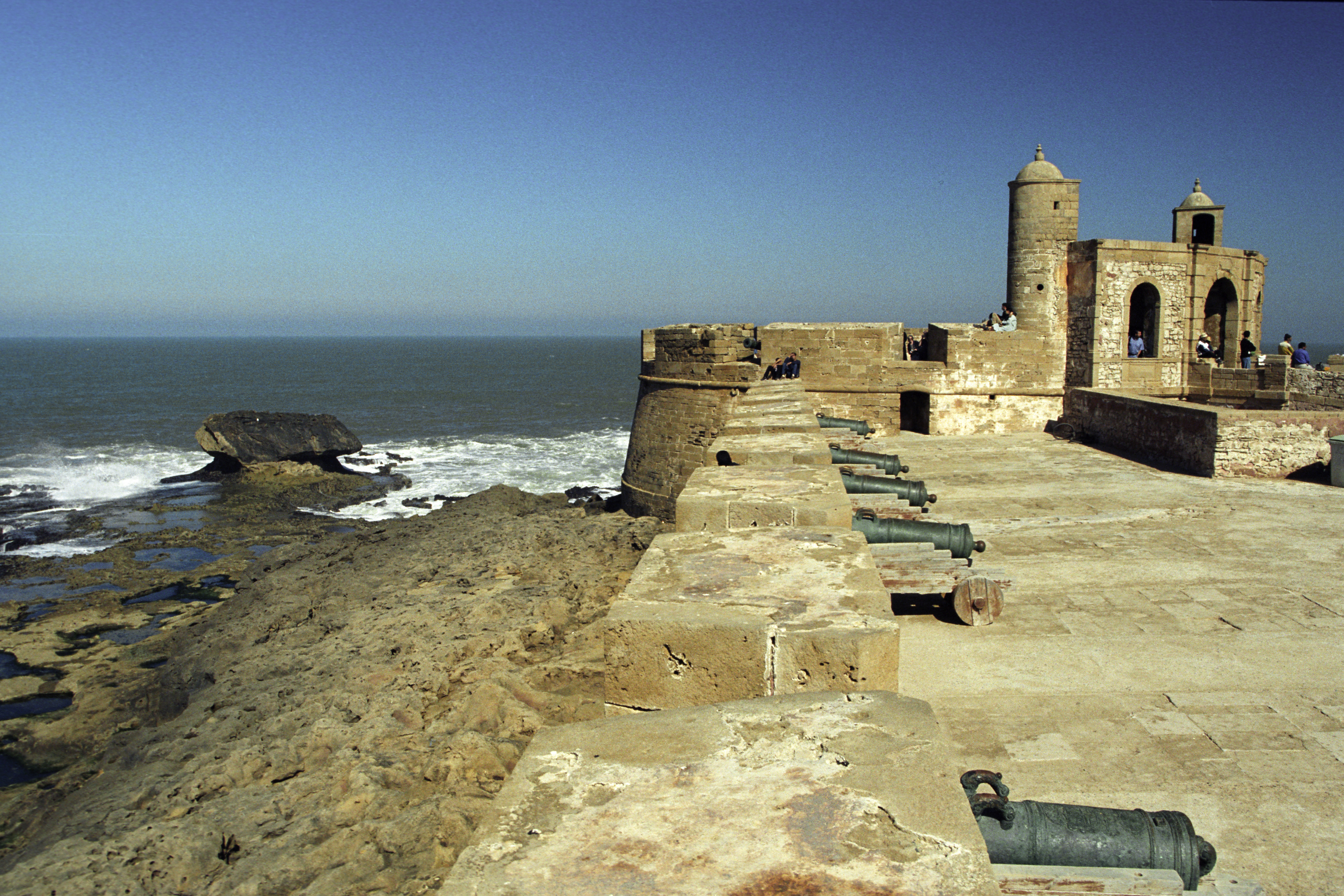
City walls.

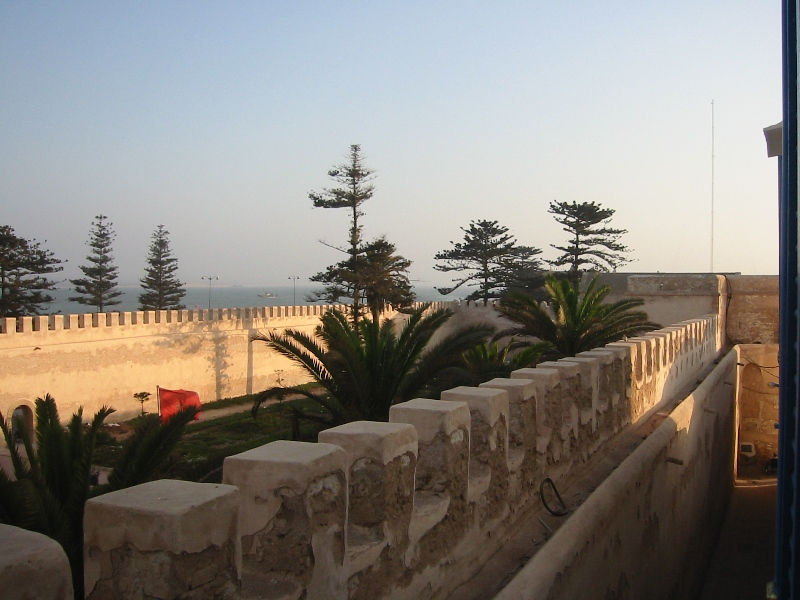
The ramparts from the Medina.

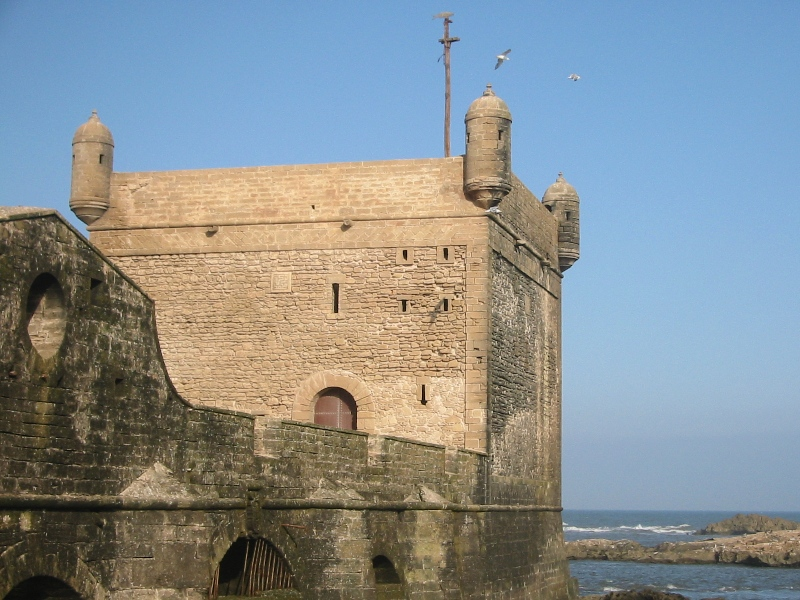
The Genoese-built citadel by the harbour.

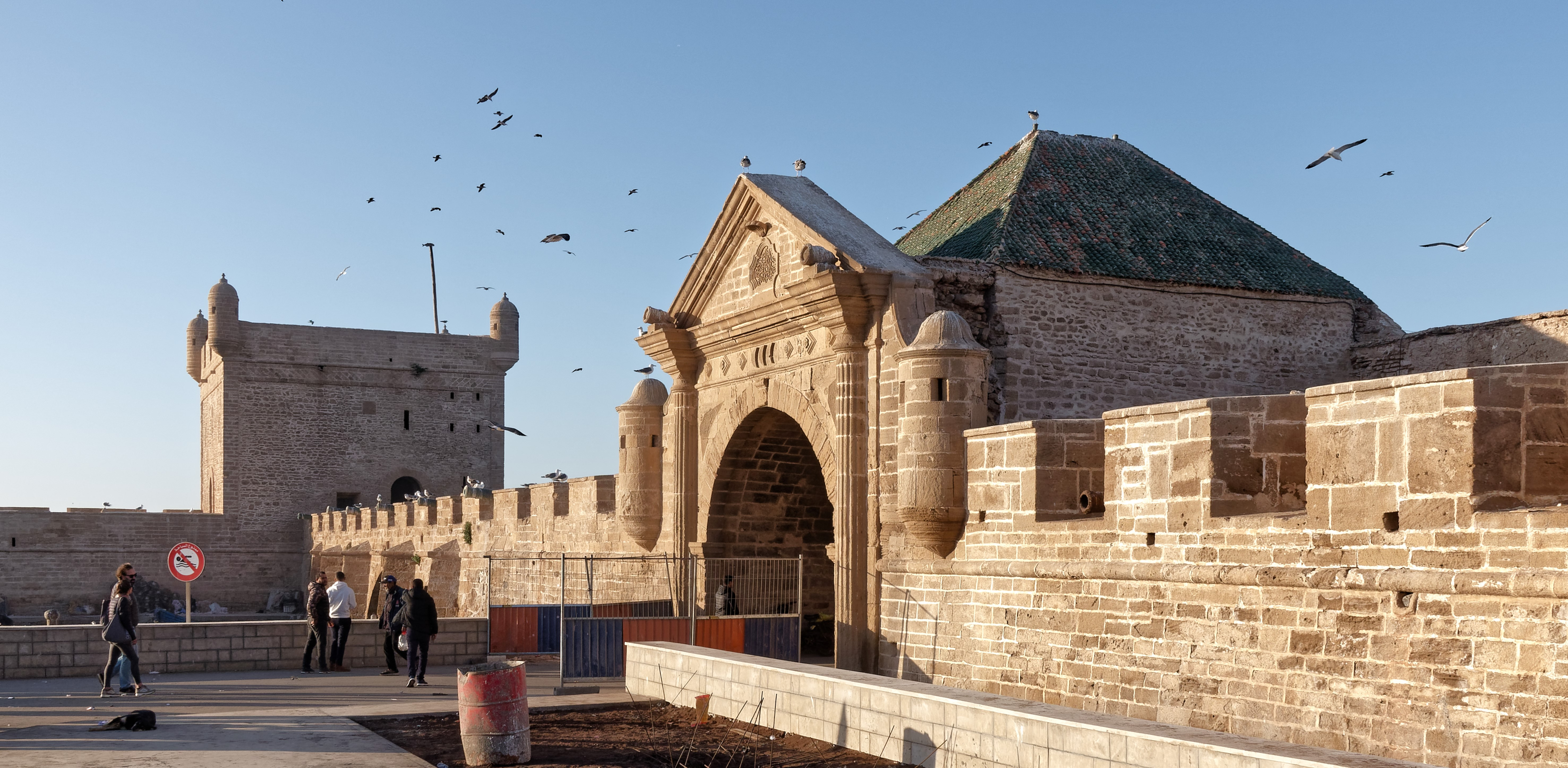
Harbour scala.

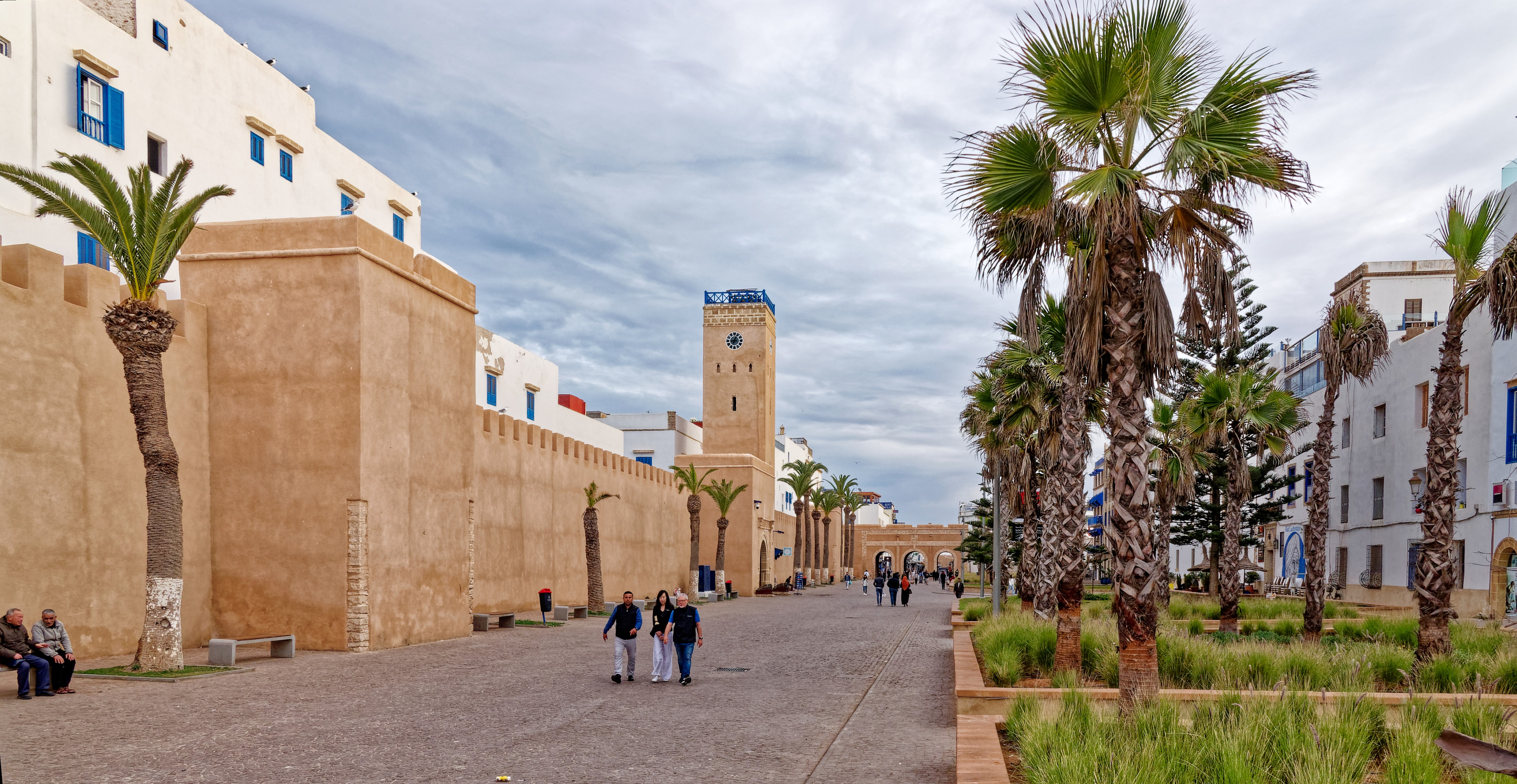
Tower and walls.

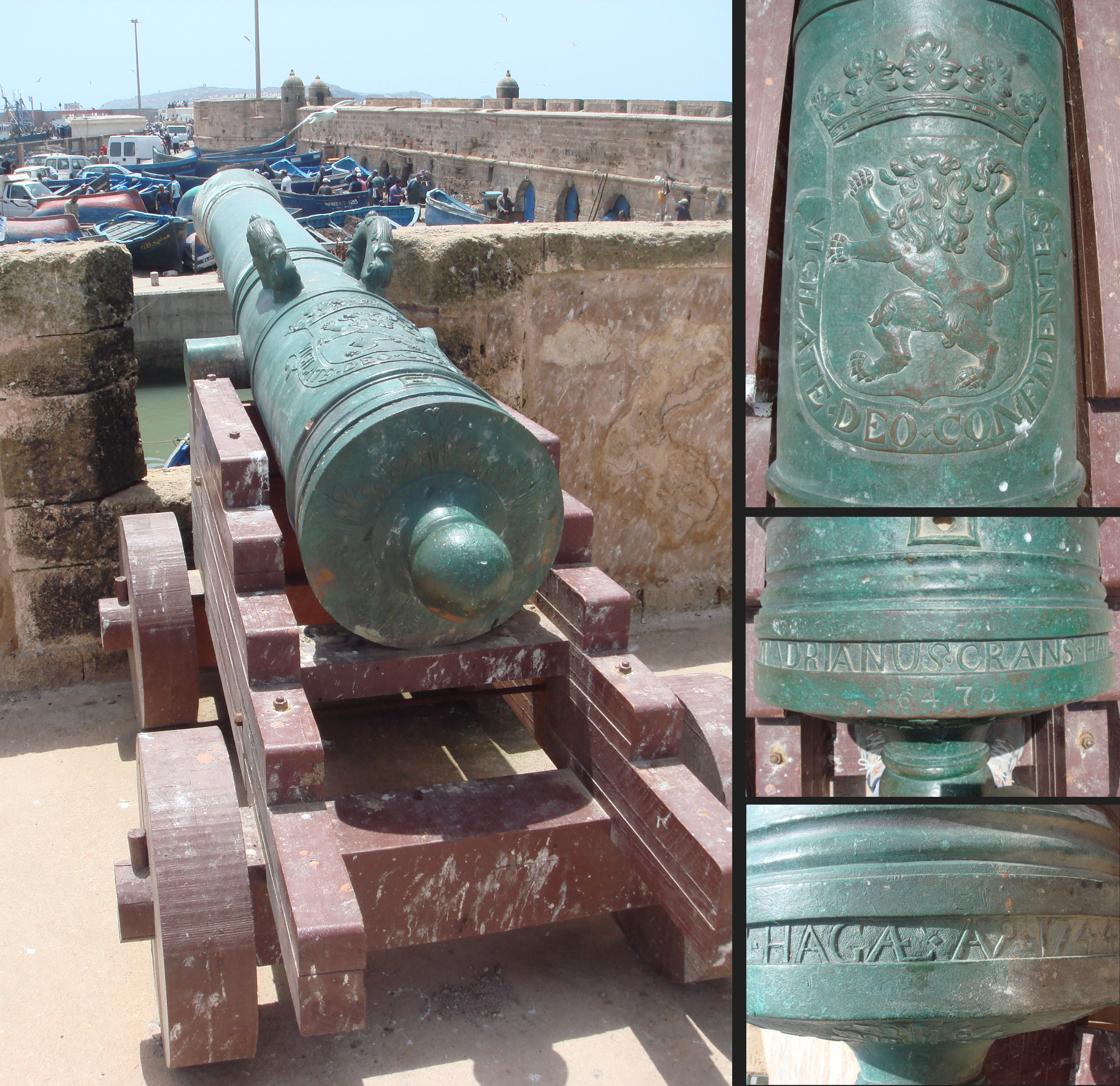
Dutch cannon made by Adrianus Crans in The Hague in 1744, installed in Essaouira.

=== Jewish presence ===
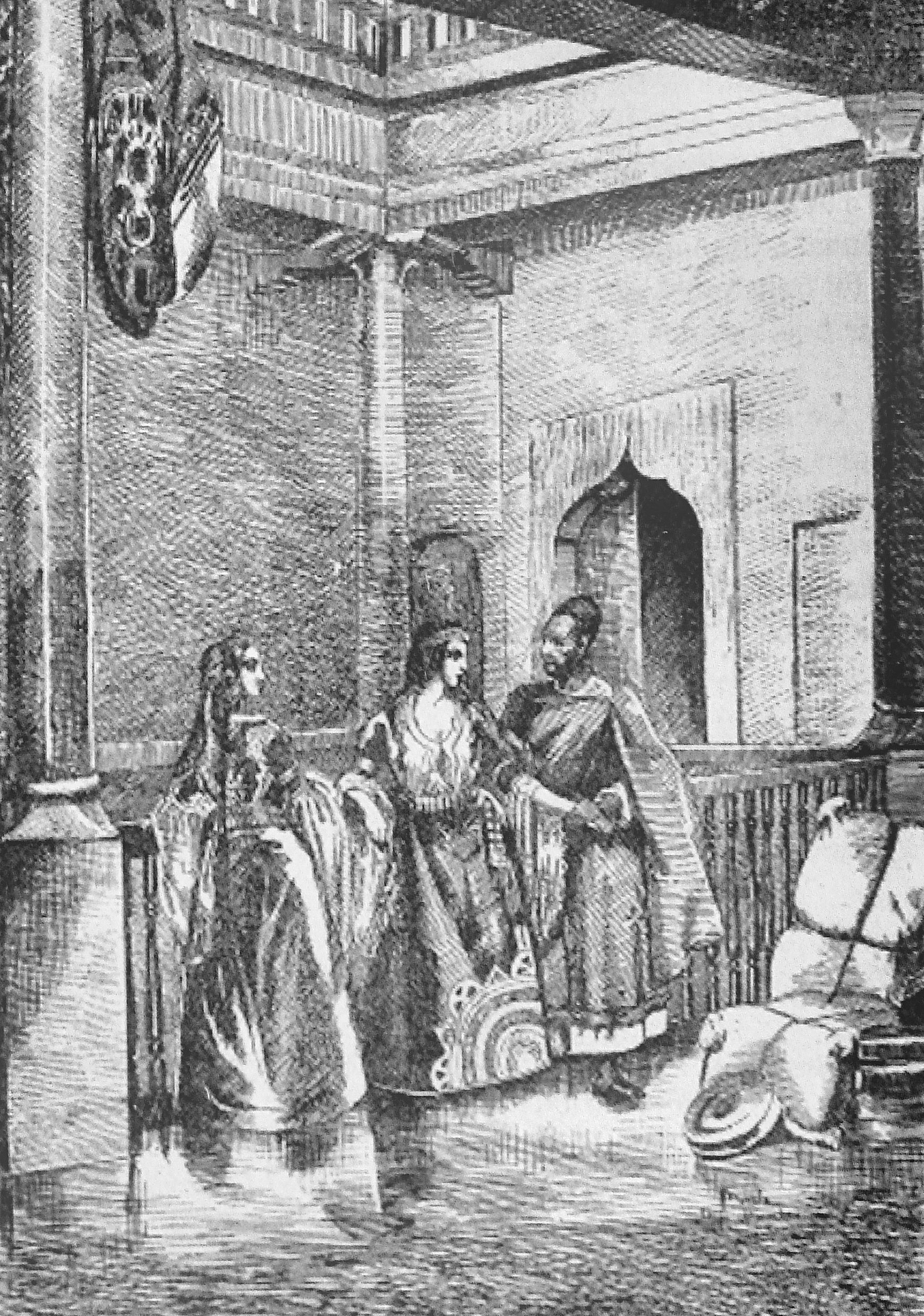
A Jewish house in Mogador, by Darondeau (1807–1841).

Mohammed III encouraged Moroccan Jews to settle in the town and handle the trade with Europe. Jews once comprised the majority of the population. According to a French botanist visiting in 1867, Jews comprised half of Essaouira's population of 12,000. The city flourished until the caravan trade died, superseded by direct European shipping trade with sub-Saharan Africa. Changes in trade, the founding of Israel, the resulting wars with Arab states, and the independence of Morocco all resulted in Sephardic Jews leaving the country. As of 2017, Essaouira had only three Jewish inhabitants.

The Jewish quarter, called the mellah, contains many old synagogues. The town also has a large Jewish cemetery. On 15 January 2020, King Mohammed VI visited Bayt Dakira, a Jewish heritage house, in Essaouira.

In May 2025, the last Jewish resident of Essaouira, Josef Sebag, died.

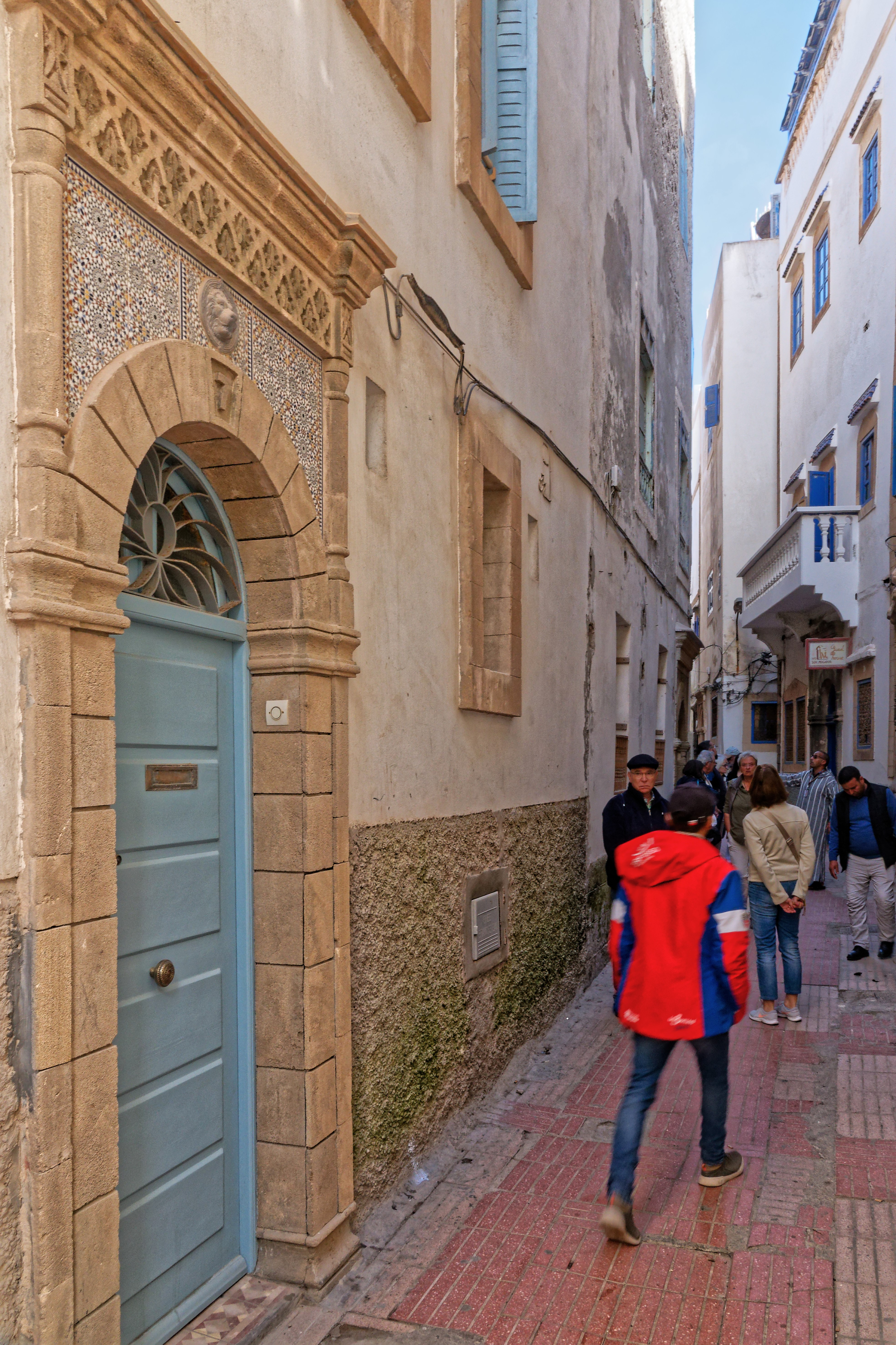
Old Jewish quarter in Essaouira.

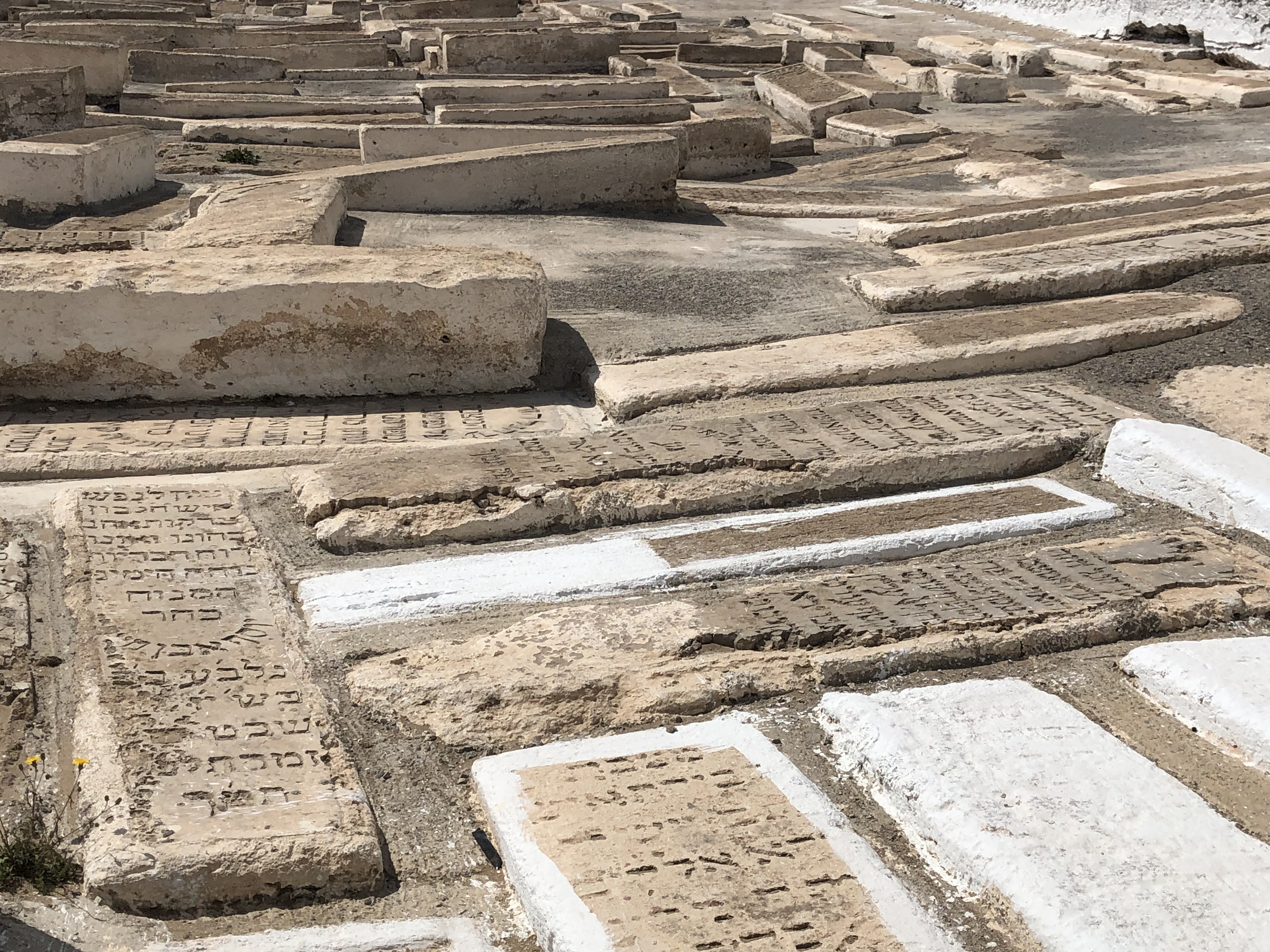
Jewish cemetery in Essaouira.

=== European trade and diplomacy ===
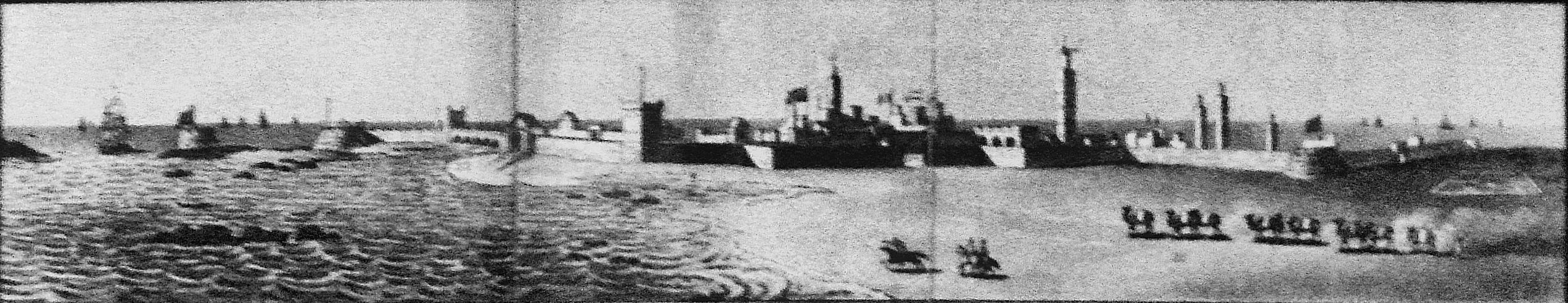
Essaouira in 1809.

In the 19th century, Essaouira became the first seaport of Morocco, with trade volumes about double those of Rabat. The city functioned as the harbour for Marrakesh, as it was only a few days from the inland city. Diplomatic and trade representations were established by European powers in Essouira. In the 1820s, European diplomats were concentrated in either Tangier or Essaouira.

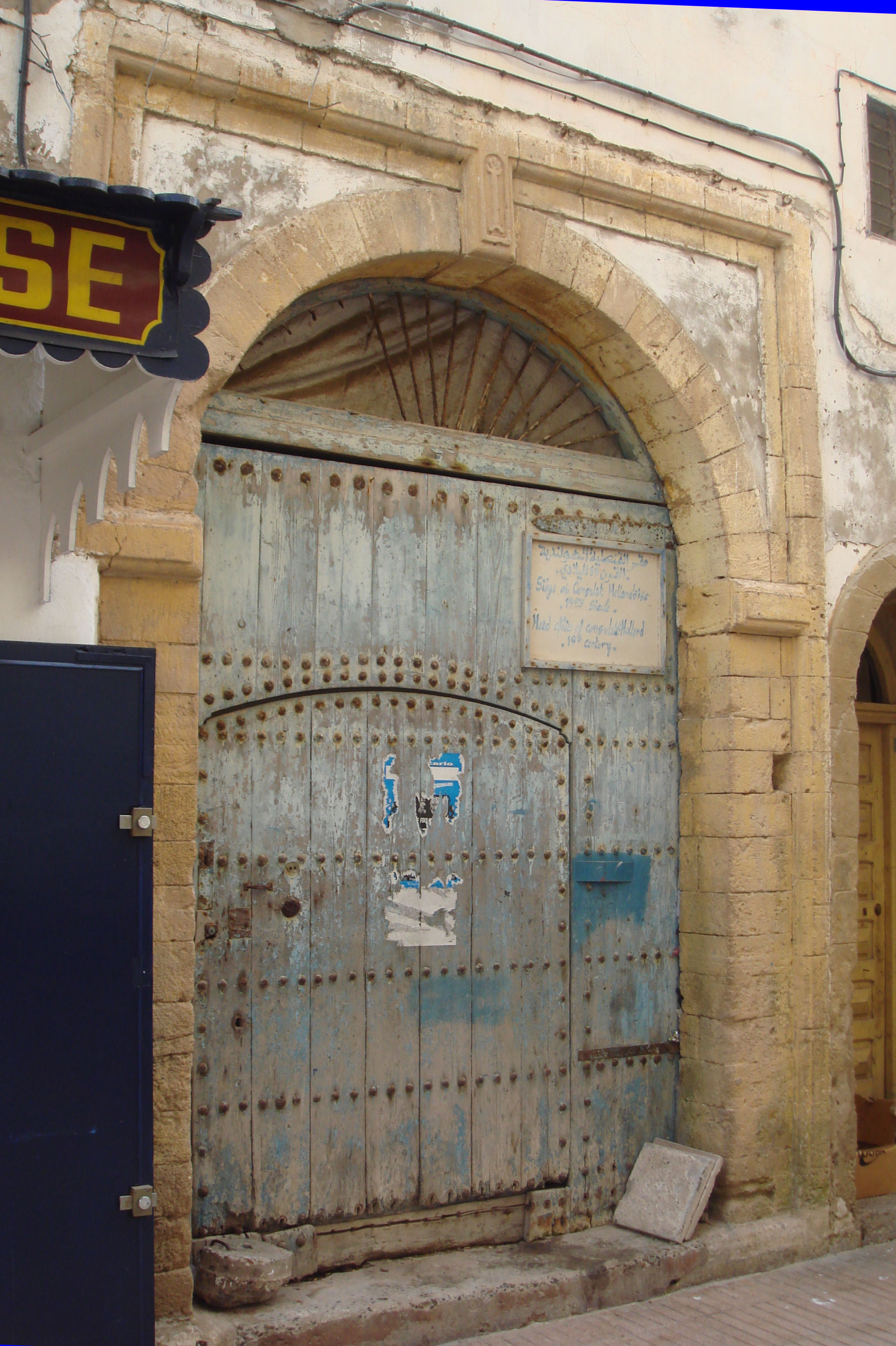
Remains of the 19th-century Dutch Consulate in Essaouira.

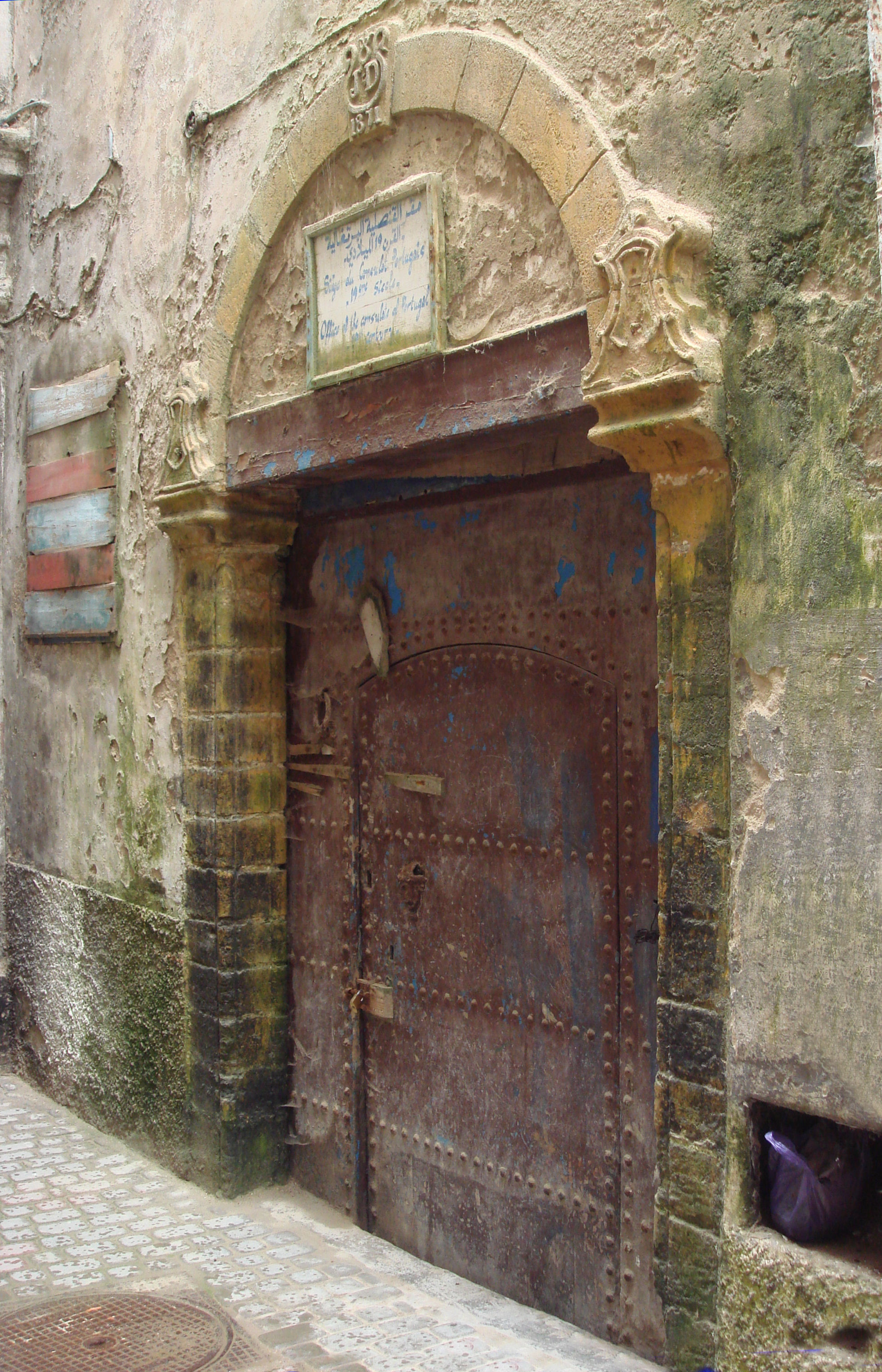
Remains of the 19th-century Portuguese Consulate in Essaouira.

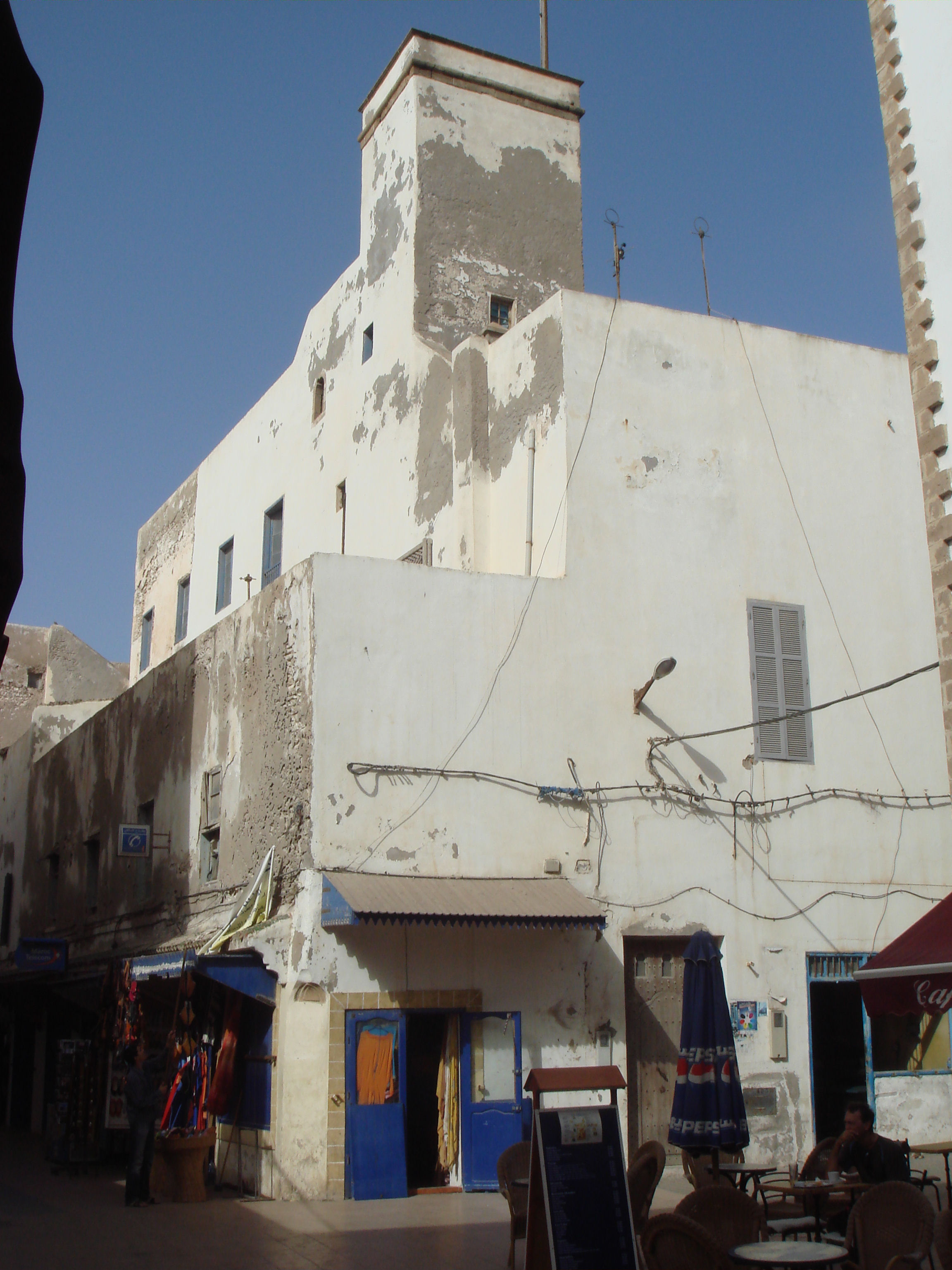
Former Essaouira English Consulate.

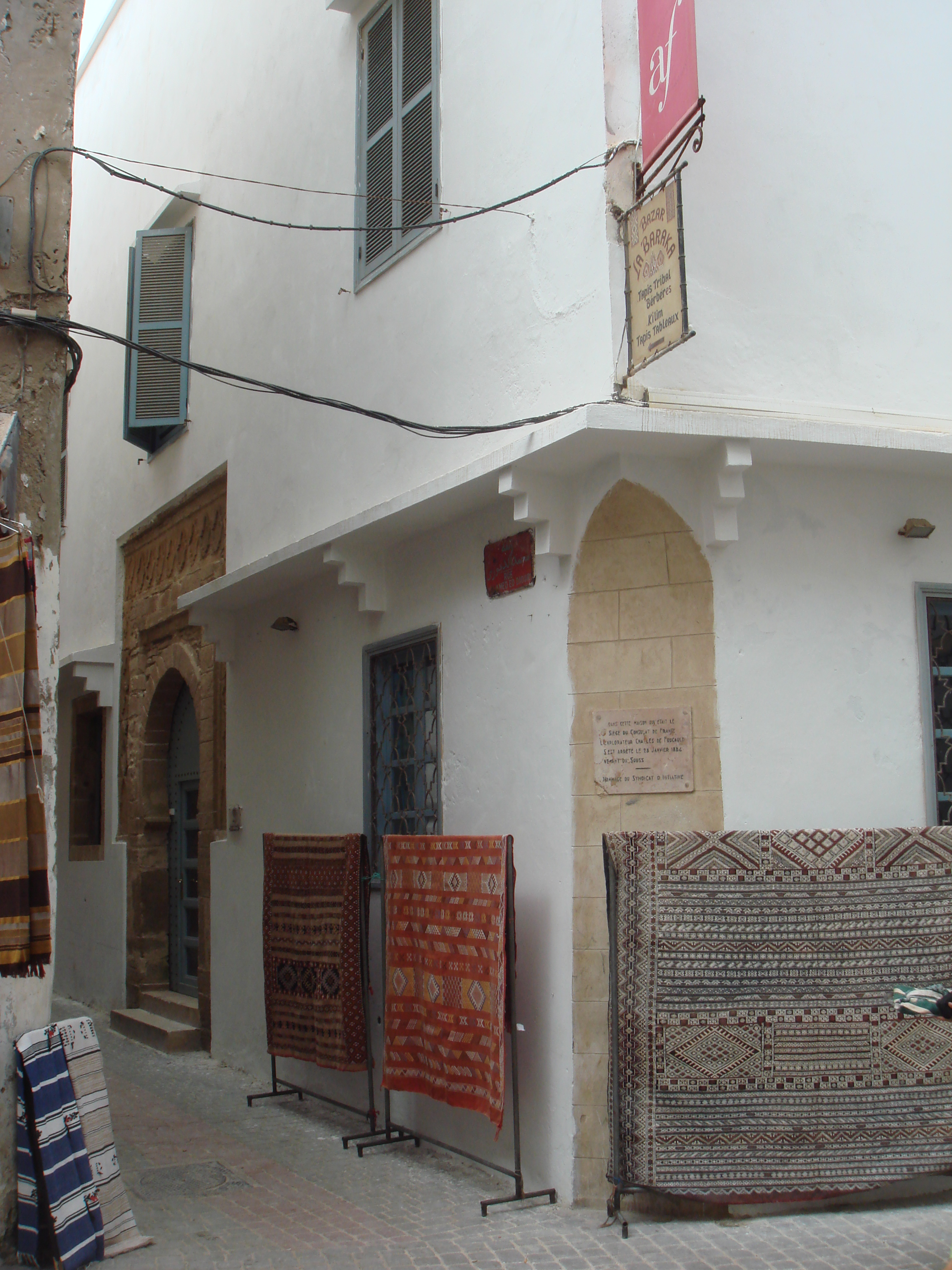
Former French Consulate in Essaouira.

=== French interventions and Protectorate ===
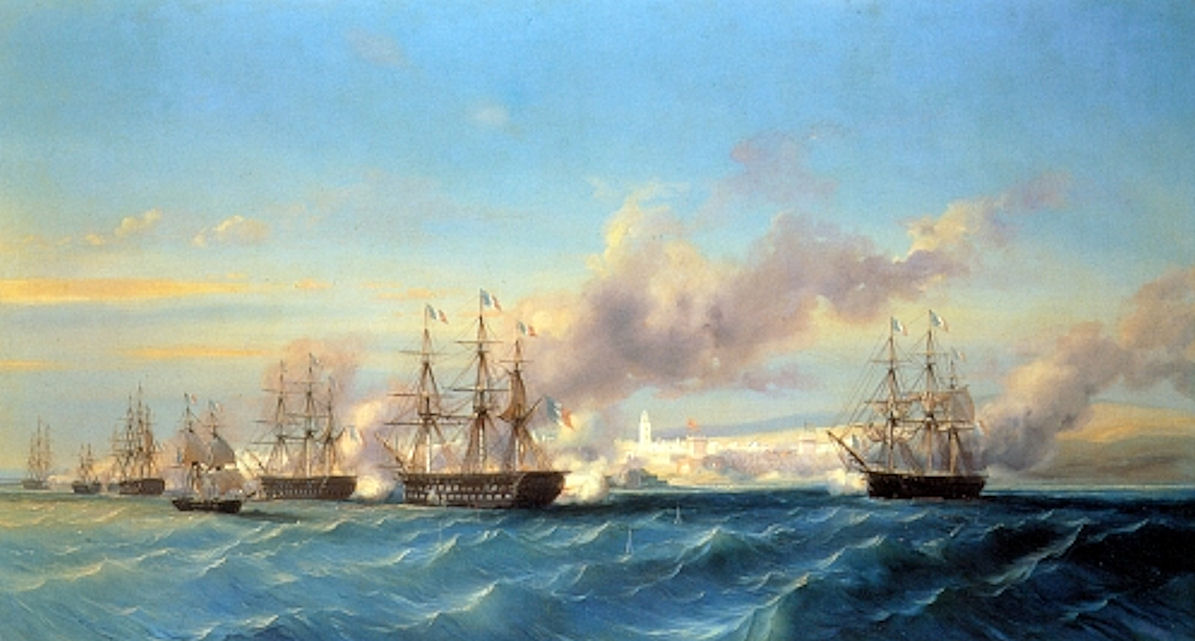
The attack of Mogador by the French fleet in August 1844, Serkis Diranian.

Following Morocco's alliance with Algeria's Abd-El-Kader against France, Essaouira was bombarded and briefly occupied by the French Navy under the Prince de Joinville on 16 August 1844, in the Bombardment of Mogador, an important battle of the First Franco-Moroccan War.

==== Bombardment by the Confederate States Navy (1864) ====
In the spring of 1864, the commerce raider CSS Georgia of the Confederate States of America's Navy arrived off of the coast of the City as a reprieve from a hard winter's sail. Upon arrival, the crew were able to lower a cutter and bend oars towards the shore. Upon landing, the crew was greeted by hostile Moroccans who knew both who they were and that their government was hostile towards them, despite spoken neutrality. The officers were then forced, at gunpoint back towards the sea and into the boats from which they arrived. Back on the ship, Captain Matthew Fontaine Maury ordered a shot from the Georgia's ten inch turret gun, followed by a salvo bombardment. No Moroccan casualties were recorded, due to their retreat from the shore during the initial shot fired. This marked the only time that Confederate guns were fired anywhere besides North America.

==== French colonial empire ====
From 1912 to 1956, Essaouira was part of the French protectorate of Morocco. Mogador was used as a base for a military expedition against Dar Anflous, when 8,000 French troops were located outside the city under the orders of Generals Franchet d'Esperey and Brulard. The Kasbah of Dar Anflous was taken on 25 January 1913. In 1930, brothers, Michel and Jean Vieuchange used Essaouira as a base before Michel set off into the Western Sahara to try to find Smara.

France had an important administrative, military and economic presence. Essaouira had a Franco-Moroccan school, still visible in Derb Dharb street. Linguistically, many Moroccans of Essaouira speak French fluently today.

=== Recent history ===
In the early 1950s, film director and actor Orson Welles stayed at the Hotel des Iles just south of the town walls during the filming of his 1952 film adaptation of Othello. Beginning in the late 1960s, Essaouira became something of a hippie hangout.

The skala or fortified harbor was used as a filming location in the third season of the American TV series Game of Thrones, representing Astapor. The beach at Essaouira was used as a location in Christopher Nolan's movie The Odyssey (2026) to film the scene of the discovery of the Trojan Horse.

== Geography ==
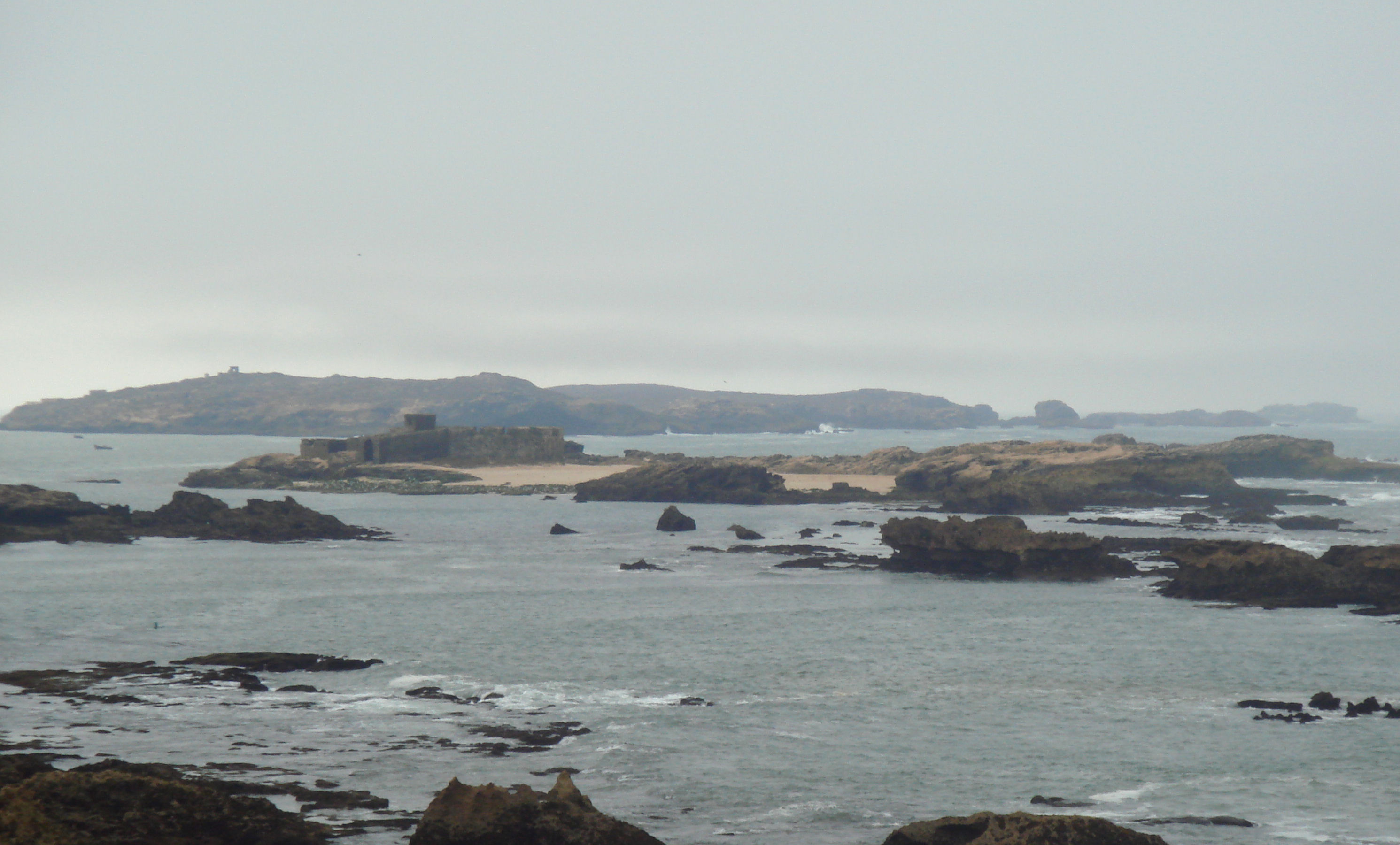
Iles Purpuraires, with Mogador island in the background seen from the ramparts of Essaouira.

Essaouira is protected by a natural bay partially shielded from wave action by the Iles Purpuraires. A broad sandy beach extends from the harbour south of Essaourira, at which point the Oued Ksob discharges to the ocean; south of the discharge lies the archaeological ruin, the Bordj El Berod. The Canary Current is responsible for the generally southward movement of ocean circulation and has led to enhancement of the local fishery. The village of Diabat lies about five kilometres (3.1 miles) south of Essaouira, immediately south of the Oued Ksob.

The Essaouira-Mogador Airport is located some 7 to 8 km (4 to 5 mi) away from the town.

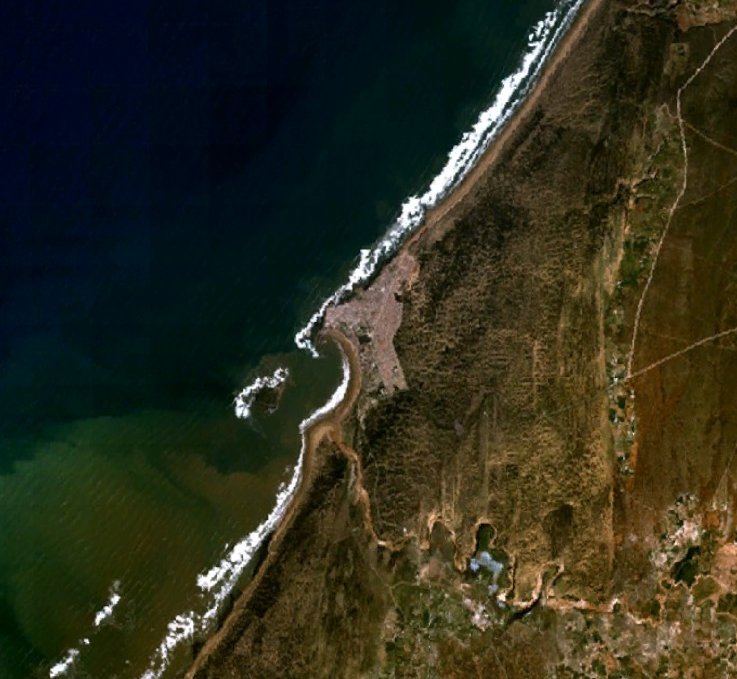
Essaouira viewed from space

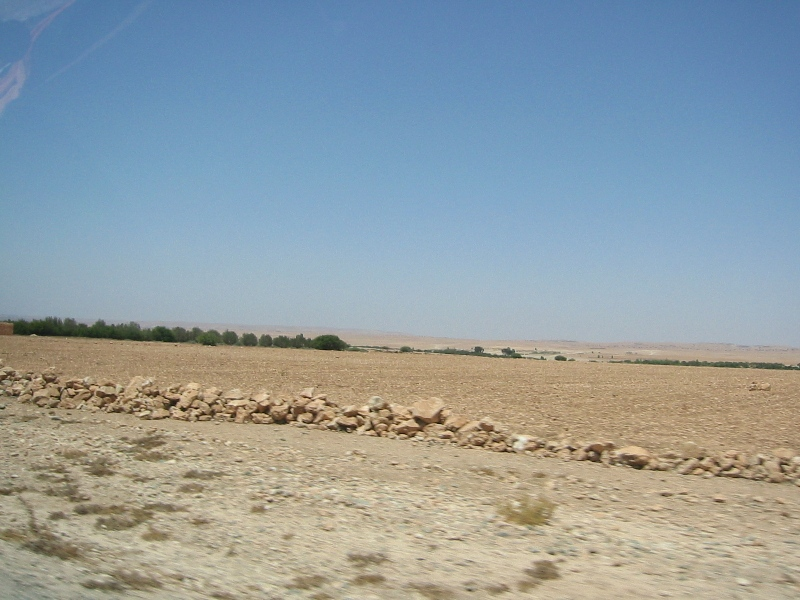
The desert road between Marrakesh and Essaouira

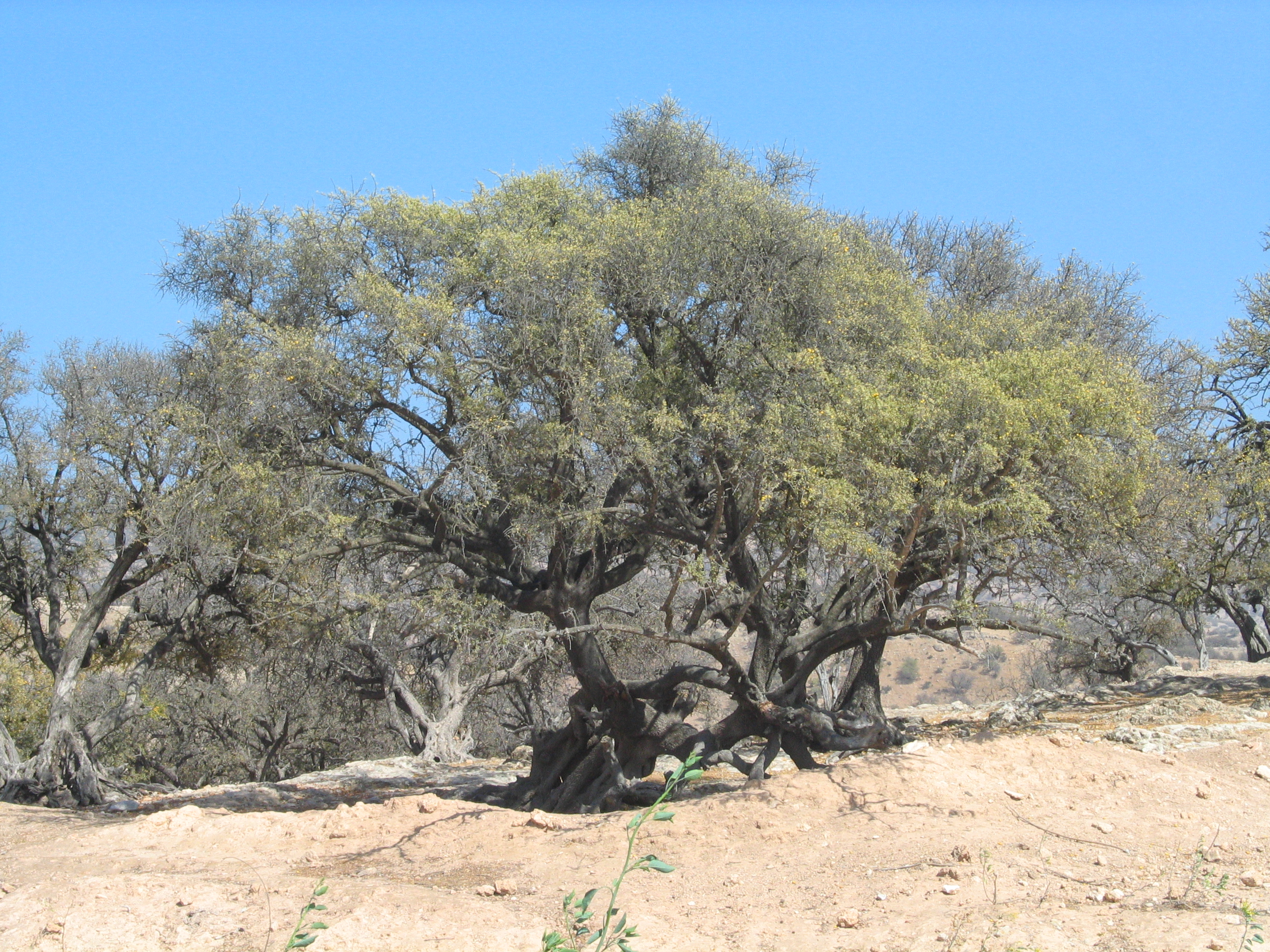
Argan tree near Essaouira

Essaouira beach

=== Climate ===
Essaouira's climate is semi-arid climate (BSk/BSh), with mild temperatures year round. The gap between highs and lows is small and summers are warm while winters are mild. Annual rainfall is usually 300 to 500 millimetres (12 to 20 in). The highest temperature ever recorded in Essaouira was 35.7 °C (96.3 °F) on 18 April 2017. The lowest temperature ever recorded was 2.2 °C (36.0 °F) on 29 January 2005. The lowest maximum temperature ever recorded was 11.8 °C (53.2 °F) on 15 February 2018. The highest minimum temperature ever recorded was 26.7 °C (80.1 °F) on 13 October 2017. The maximum amount of precipitation recorded in one day was 99.1 millimetres (3.90 in) on 8 March 2013.

Climate data for Essaouira (1991–2020, extremes 1982–present)
| Month | Jan | Feb | Mar | Apr | May | Jun | Jul | Aug | Sep | Oct | Nov | Dec | Year |
|---|---|---|---|---|---|---|---|---|---|---|---|---|---|
| Record high °C (°F) | 28.8 (83.8) | 33.9 (93.0) | 34.8 (94.6) | 35.7 (96.3) | 34.2 (93.6) | 31.8 (89.2) | 35.0 (95.0) | 34.0 (93.2) | 33.8 (92.8) | 35.0 (95.0) | 33.2 (91.8) | 30.0 (86.0) | 35.7 (96.3) |
| Mean daily maximum °C (°F) | 18.4 (65.1) | 18.7 (65.7) | 19.4 (66.9) | 19.5 (67.1) | 20.6 (69.1) | 21.4 (70.5) | 21.9 (71.4) | 22.4 (72.3) | 22.6 (72.7) | 22.2 (72.0) | 20.5 (68.9) | 19.4 (66.9) | 20.6 (69.1) |
| Daily mean °C (°F) | 14.8 (58.6) | 15.3 (59.5) | 16.3 (61.3) | 16.8 (62.2) | 18.2 (64.8) | 19.3 (66.7) | 19.8 (67.6) | 20.2 (68.4) | 20.3 (68.5) | 19.6 (67.3) | 17.5 (63.5) | 16.0 (60.8) | 17.8 (64.0) |
| Mean daily minimum °C (°F) | 11.1 (52.0) | 12.0 (53.6) | 13.3 (55.9) | 14.1 (57.4) | 15.7 (60.3) | 17.1 (62.8) | 17.7 (63.9) | 18.1 (64.6) | 18.0 (64.4) | 17.0 (62.6) | 14.4 (57.9) | 12.6 (54.7) | 15.1 (59.2) |
| Record low °C (°F) | 2.2 (36.0) | 6.2 (43.2) | 7.7 (45.9) | 10.1 (50.2) | 11.0 (51.8) | 14.0 (57.2) | 14.2 (57.6) | 14.2 (57.6) | 14.8 (58.6) | 12.2 (54.0) | 8.2 (46.8) | 6.0 (42.8) | 2.2 (36.0) |
| Average precipitation mm (inches) | 48.5 (1.91) | 37.3 (1.47) | 38.1 (1.50) | 17.3 (0.68) | 9.4 (0.37) | 0.5 (0.02) | 0.0 (0.0) | 0.8 (0.03) | 4.3 (0.17) | 33.3 (1.31) | 54.5 (2.15) | 55.7 (2.19) | 299.7 (11.80) |
| Average precipitation days (≥ 1 mm) | 4.6 | 4.2 | 4.2 | 2.6 | 1.3 | 0.1 | 0.0 | 0.2 | 0.9 | 3.3 | 4.7 | 4.8 | 30.9 |
| Average relative humidity (%) | 80 | 81 | 81 | 82 | 82 | 84 | 86 | 86 | 84 | 83 | 80 | 81 | 83 |
| Mean monthly sunshine hours | 208.5 | 204.9 | 247.2 | 264.0 | 289.5 | 290.9 | 301.6 | 291.4 | 251.8 | 234.1 | 197.0 | 197.6 | 2,978.5 |
| Mean daily sunshine hours | 6.7 | 7.3 | 8.0 | 8.8 | 9.3 | 9.7 | 9.7 | 9.4 | 8.4 | 7.6 | 6.6 | 6.4 | 8.2 |
Source 1: NOAA (sun 1961–1990)
Source 2: Deutscher Wetterdienst (humidity 1973-1992)

== Education ==
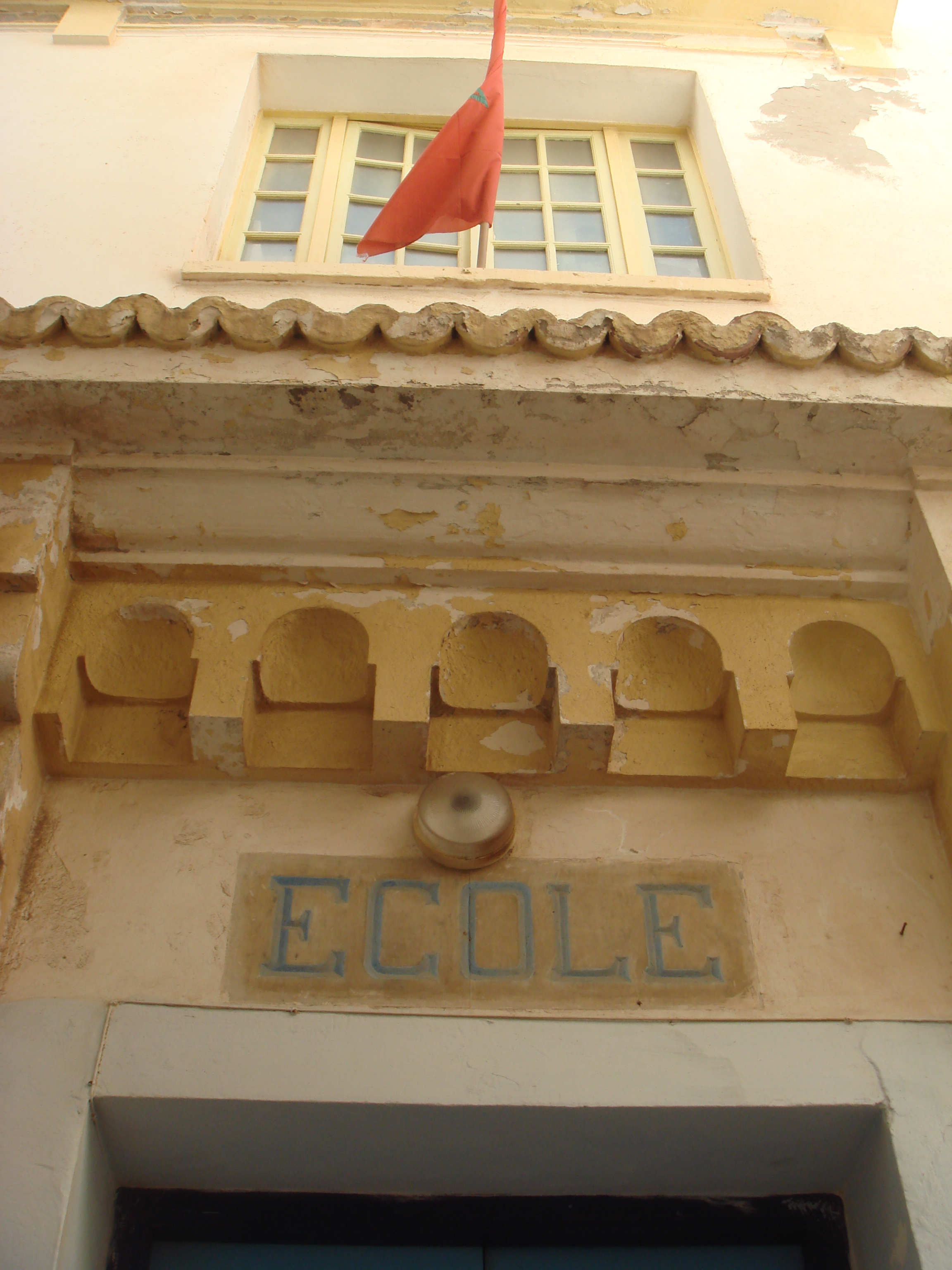
Former Franco-Moroccan school in Derb Dharb street, Essaouira.

There is a French international school in Essaouira, Groupe scolaire Eric-Tabarly.

== Economy ==
The medina is home to many small arts and crafts businesses, notably cabinet making and 'thuya' wood-carving (using roots of the Tetraclinis tree), both of which have been practised in Essaouira for centuries.

The fishing harbour, suffering from the competition of Agadir and Safi, remains rather small, although the catches (sardines, conger eels) are surprisingly abundant due to the coastal upwelling generated by the powerful trade winds and the Canaries Current. Essaouira remains one of the major fishing harbours of Morocco.

Essaouira is also a center of argan oil production.

== Culture ==
Concert at the 2025 Gnaoua World Music Festival in Essaouira

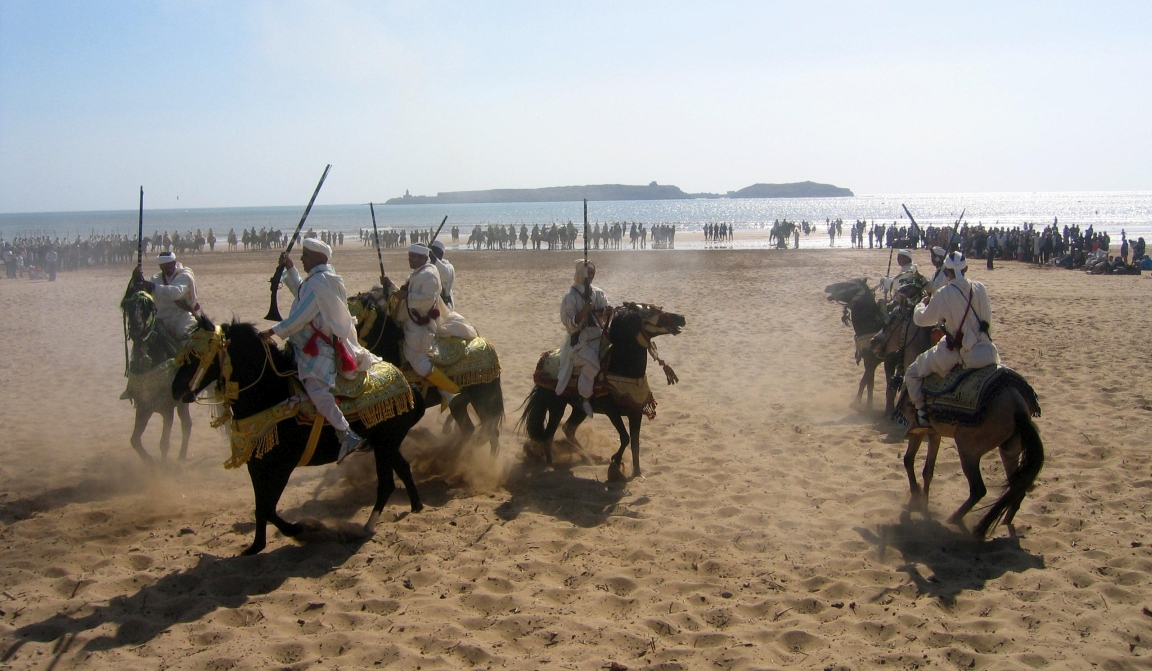
Berber horsemen during a fantasia celebration on Essaouira beach

Since 1998, the Gnaoua Festival of World Music is held in Essaouira, normally in the last week of June. It brings together artists from all over the world. Although focused on gnaoua music, it includes rock, jazz and reggae. Known as the "Moroccan Woodstock", it lasts four days and attracts around 450,000 spectators annually.

The city also hosts MOGA Festival, an Electronic music festival established in 2016. The event is split into two components: "MOGA OFF", which features free access events, art installations, surf sessions, and local electronic music showcases across different venues, riads, and rooftops in the Medina; and "MOGA IN", which features international headliners on multiple stages. In addition to performances, the festival incorporates professional initiatives like the "MOGA Academy" and "MOGA Connect," offering free training programs, workshops, and panels for young electronic music producers and DJs in partnership with organizations such as the British Council.

== Sights ==
Jewish quarter "Mellah" of Essaouira's old medina

- Bayt Dakira - "House of Memory" (Jewish museum)
- Chaim Pinto Synagogue
- Slat Lkahal Synagogue
- Jewish cemeteries of Essaouira (old and new)
  - Gravesite of Rabbi Haim Pinto
- Medina
- Fortifications:
  - Sqala du Port
  - Sqala de la Kasbah
- The most picturesque gates:
  - Port de la Marine
  - Bab Manjana with clocktower
- Tagart beach (with sand dunes)
- Notre-Dame-de-l’Assomption church (catholic, operational)
- Sidi Mogdoul mosque
- Sidi Mogdoul lighthouse
- Ben Youssef mosque

== International relations ==
Essaouira is twinned with:

- Changshu, China
- La Rochelle, France

== Notable people ==
- Albert Almoznino, hand shadow artist
- André Azoulay, adviser to the king
- David Bensoussan, memoirist
- David Hanania Pinto, rabbi
- Edmond Amran El Maleh, writer
- Jacques Amir, politician
- Mahmoud Guinia, Gnawa musician
- Meir Cohen, politician
- Victor Elmaleh, businessman and athlete

== See also ==
- Haha
- Regraga
- Tensift River
- Souira Guedima
- Gnaoua World Music Festival
- Gnaoua
- André Jodin
- William Willshire
