= Sidi Mohammed ben Abdallah Museum =

History museum in Essaouira, Morocco

- Musée Sidi Mohammed ben Abdallah
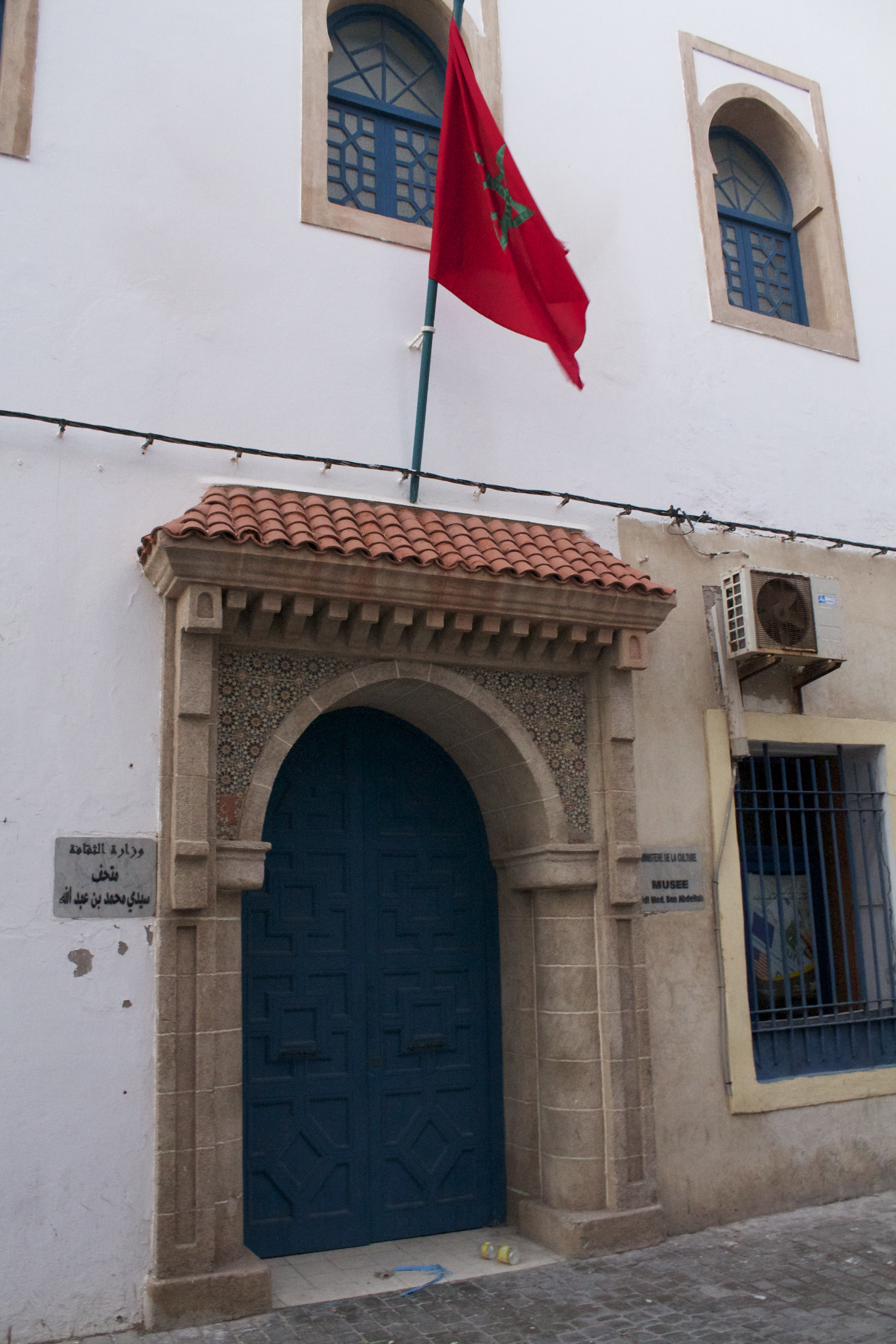
- Exterior of the Sidi Mohammed ben Abdallah Museum in Essaouira
- Established: 20 October 1980
- Location: Rue Laâlouj, Essaouira, Morocco
- Coordinates: 31.5139°N 9.7714°W
- Type: History museum
- Collections: Pottery, coins, jewellery, carpets, and historical artefacts

The Sidi Mohammed ben Abdallah Museum (French: "Musée Sidi Mohammed ben Abdallah") is a history museum in the city of Essaouira, Morocco. It was named after the founder of the city, Mohammed ben Abdallah.

It is located in a 19th-century mansion, Rue Laâlouj, a central street of the city of Essaouira.

The museum displays various historical artifacts, including ancient pottery, coins, jewellery, carpets relevant to the history of Essaouira.

== Building and collections ==
The museum is housed in a former 19th-century seigniorial residence. Its displays present the cultural heritage of Essaouira Province, including material related to the history of the city and its region from prehistoric times to the present. The museum also includes collections related to Essaouira’s craft heritage.
