= Ahmed el Inglizi =

English-Moroccan architect (fl. 1770)

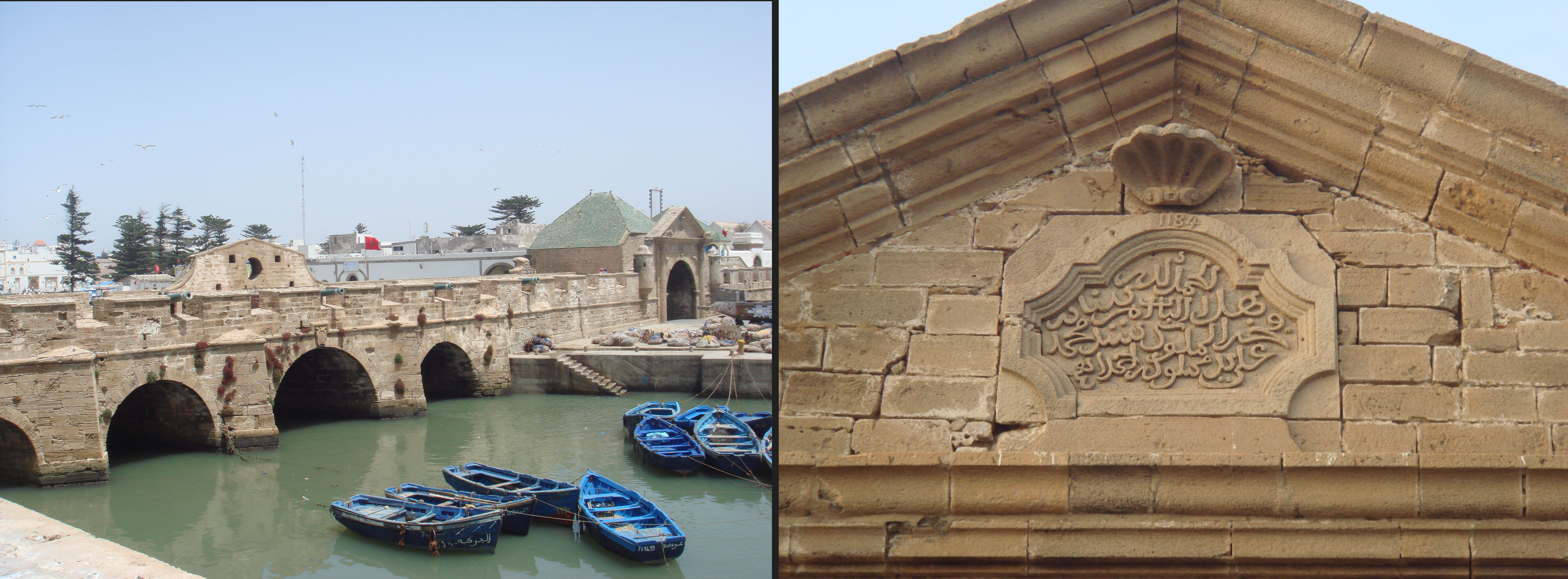
The harbour fortifications in Essaouira were partly built by Ahmed El Alj, also known as Ahmed el Inglizi, in 1770, as described in the sculptured inscription in Arabic (right).

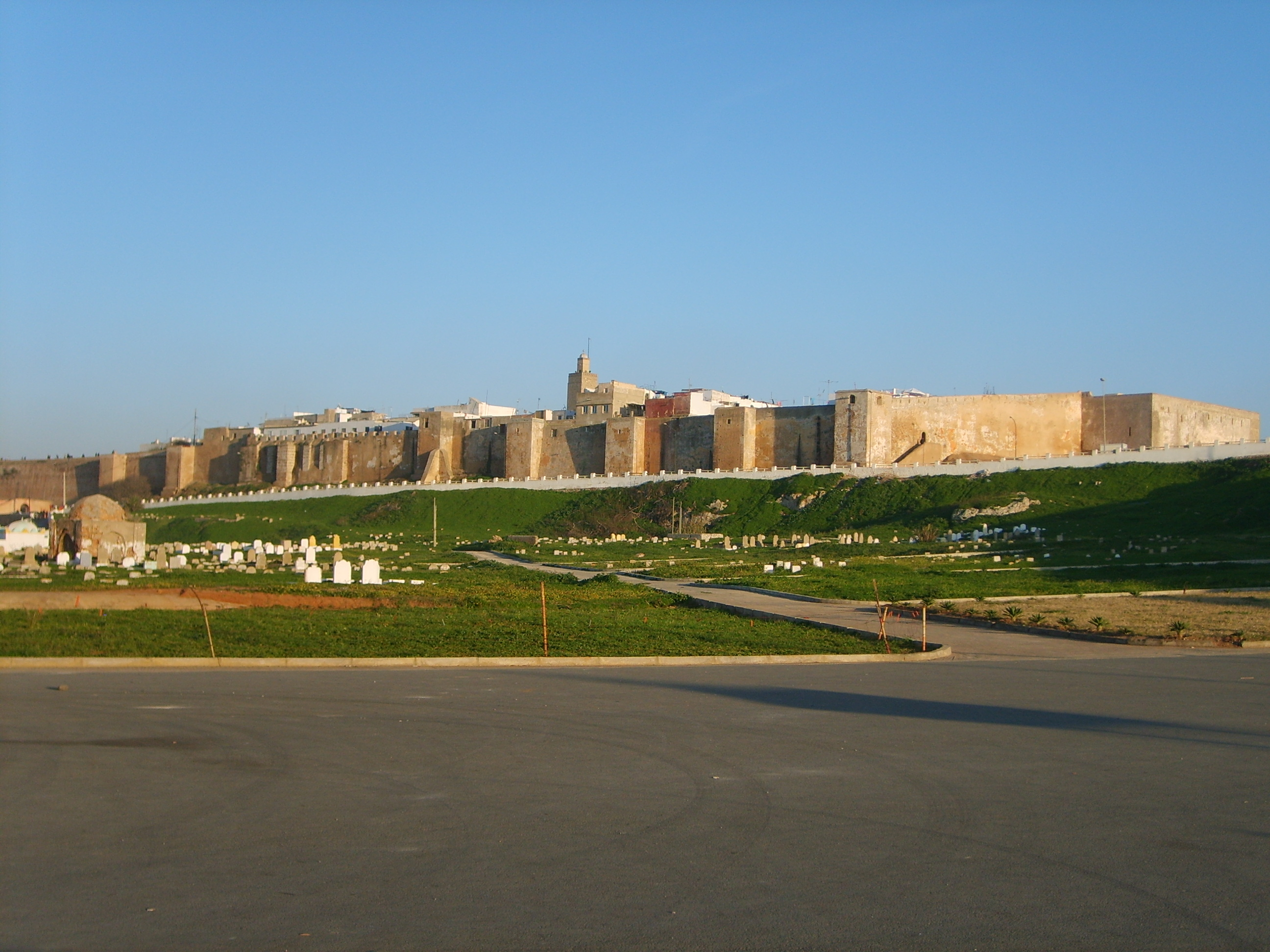
The Mosque of the Kasbah of the Udayas in Rabat was restored by Ahmed el Inglizi.

Ahmed el Inglizi (Arabic: أحمد الإنجليزي, lit. 'Ahmed the English'), also Ahmed El Alj or Ahmed Laalaj (Arabic: أحمد العلج, lit. 'Ahmed the Renegade'), was an English renegade architect and engineer who worked for the Sultan of Morocco Mohammed ben Abdallah in the 18th century. As described by his surname "El Alj", Ahmed el Inglizi was a "renegade", i.e. he had abandoned Christianity for Islam. He seems to have joined with the pirates known as the Salé Rovers.

He is known for building parts of Essaouira (particularly the harbour entrance), after Frenchman Théodore Cornut had designed and built the city itself, particularly the kasbah, corresponding to the Royal quarters and the buildings for Christian merchants and diplomats.

Ahmed el Inglizi is also known to have worked for the king in Rabat, where he restored the kasbah mosque, an old building dating to around 1150. He was also responsible for several of the fortifications built in Rabat.

== See also ==
- Anglo-Turkish piracy
