= HMS Rose =

HMS Rose and similar, is the name of several ships. These include:

== Royal Navy ships designated "HMS" ==
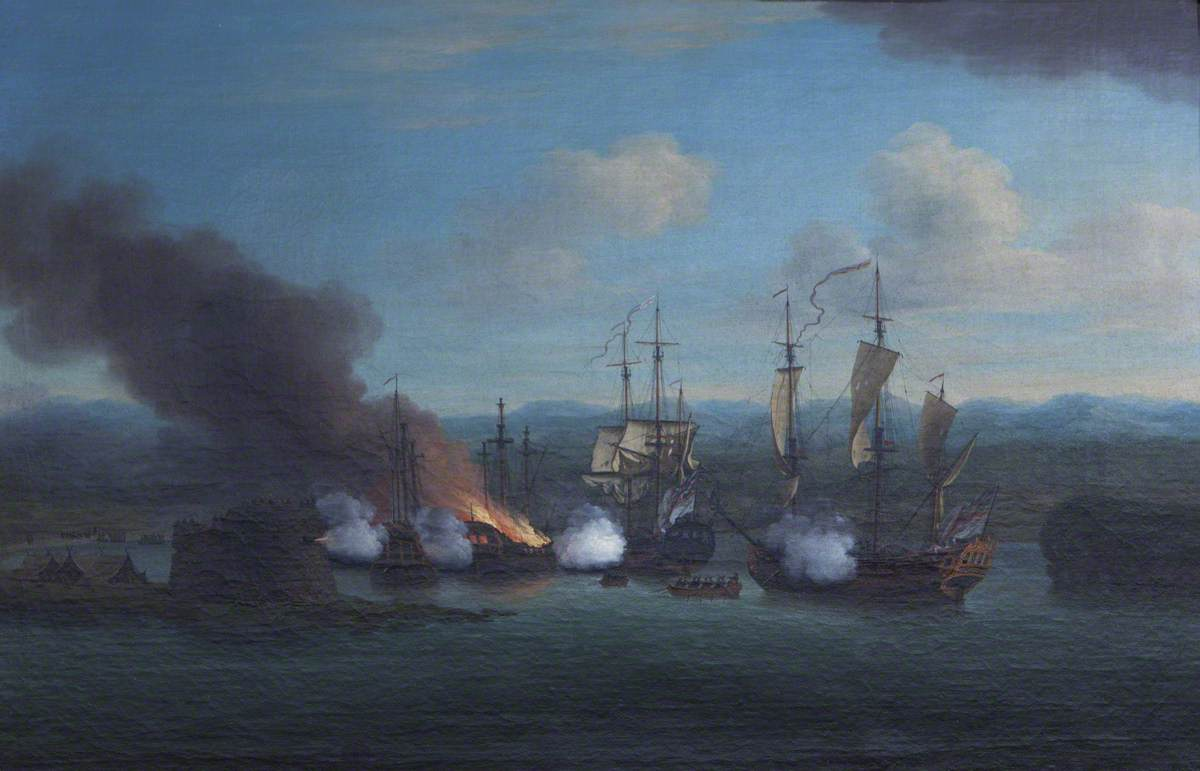
Richard Paton painting depicting HMS Rose and HMS Shoreham engaging two Salé Rovers off Mogador Island in 1734

Twenty ships of the British Royal Navy have been named Rose or HMS Rose after the rose:

- English ship Rose (1222) was a King's ship in 1222.
- English ship Rose (1300) was a Cinque Ports ship in 1300. She was captured by the French in 1338 but was retaken in 1340.
- English ship Rose (1419) was a ballinger acquired in 1419 and sold in 1425.
- English ship Rose (1512) was a galley listed from 1512 until 1521.
- English ship Rose (1657) was a 6-gun pink launched in 1657 and transferred in 1661 to the Irish Packet Service.
- HMS Rose (1670) was a 4-gun fireship captured from the Algerians in 1670 and expended in 1671.
- HMS Rose (1672) was a 6-gun dogger captured from the Dutch in 1672 and lost in 1673.
- HMS Rose (1674) was a 28-gun fifth rate launched in 1674, converted into a fireship in 1689 and sold in 1698.
- HMS Rose (1684) (also known as Sally Rose) was a 16-gun sixth rate, formerly a Salé pirate captured in 1684 and sold in 1696.
- HMS Rose (1709) was a 20-gun sixth rate purchased in 1709 and sold in 1712.
- HMS Rose (1712) was a 20-gun sixth rate launched in 1712, rebuilt in 1724, hulked in 1739 and sold in 1744.
- HMS Rose (1740) was a 24-gun sixth rate launched in 1740 and sold in 1755.
- HMS Rose (1757) was a 20-gun sixth rate launched in 1757 and sunk as a block ship in 1779.
- HMS Rose (1783) was a 28-gun sixth rate launched in 1783 and wrecked in 1794.
- HMS Rose (1805) was an 18-gun sloop launched in 1805 and sold in 1817 for breaking up.

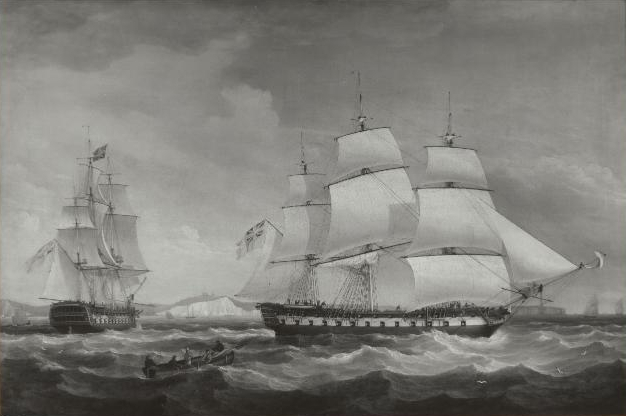
HMS Rose, commanded by Jas. Sandilands Esq., off Dover. (Note: Photo of a painting by Thomas Whitcombe, courtesy of the Paul Mellon Centre Photographic Archive.)

- HMS Rose (1821) was an 18-gun sloop launched in 1821 and broken up in 1851.
- HMS Rose (1856) was an Albacore-class gunboat launched in 1856 and broken up in 1868.
- HMS Rose (1857) was a survey cutter purchased in 1857. She was stranded in 1864 and the wreck later sold.
- HMS Rose (1880) was a coastguard yawl launched in 1880 and sold in 1906.
- HMS Rose (K102) was a Flower-class corvette launched in 1941. She was lent to the Royal Norwegian Navy and sank in 1944 after colliding with HMS Manners.

== Other vessels ==
- HM hired cutter Rose – any one of five hired armed vessels that served the Royal Navy between 1799 and 1804
- HMS Surprise (replica ship), a 1970 replica of the 1757 HMS Rose, now named HMS Surprise, originally launched as HMS Rose

== See also ==
- Rose (disambiguation)
- HMS Mary Rose
- HMS Rosebay
- English ship Rosebush
- HMS Rosemary
