= Salletine =

A Salletine (plural Salletines) is an inhabitant of the city of Salé or of the historical Republic of Salé, or one of the infamous Salé Rovers who operated out of the Port of Salé.
