= Borj Al Baroud =

Moroccan cultural heritage site

Coordinates: 31.48901°N 9.775625°W

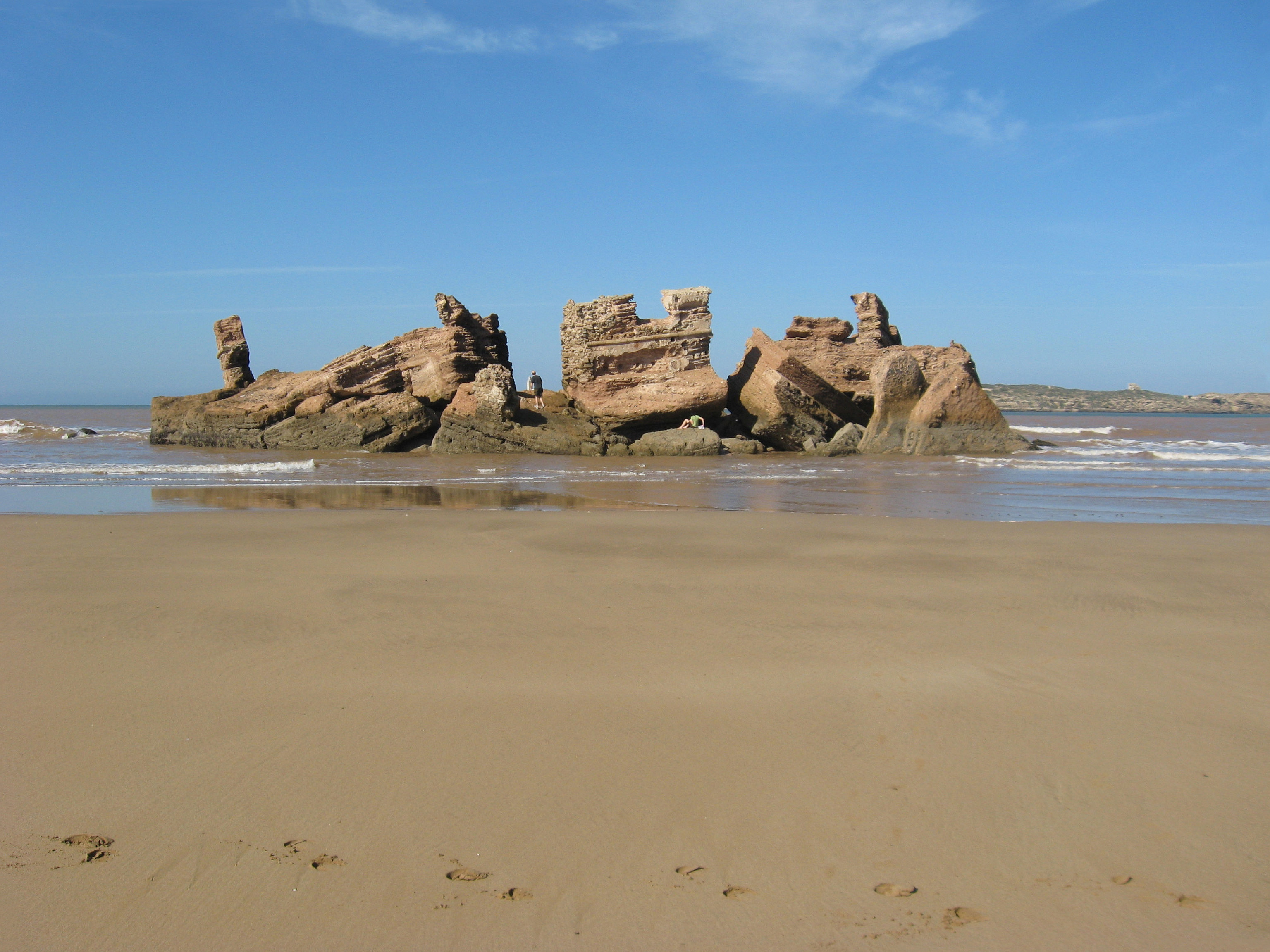
Bourj el Baroud

Bourj El Baroud is a ruined watchtower located somewhat south of the mouth of the Oued Ksob near Essaouira, Morocco. This structure is located on a broad sandy beach directly across from Phoenician ruins at the southeast tip of the main islet of Iles Purpuraires. (Hogan, 2007) This beach is likely the one referred to in Herodotus' account of the Phoenicians' trading with the indigenous peoples of this part of western Morocco. About one kilometre inland is the village of Diabat.

== In popular culture ==
The locals tell that the ruin inspired the Jimi Hendrix song "Castles Made of Sand" on The Jimi Hendrix Experience album Axis: Bold As Love. In fact, Hendrix only visited Essaouria once, in 1969, two years after that album was made, so the story is presumably false.

The castle was built by Mohammed ben Abdallah, the 'Alawi Sultan of Morocco, in the 18th century, but is mistakenly referred to as "The Portuguese Castle" by local guides. This is a confusion with the Portuguese castle built in 1506 in the Essaouira city harbour by the Portuguese, the Castelo Real.

== Literature ==
- TAST, Brigitte; TAST, Hans-Juergen. Still the wind cries Jimi. Hendrix in Marokko, Schellerten, 2012, ISBN 978-3-88842-040-5
