= Philip Saumarez =

Royal Navy officer (1710–1747)

Philip de Saumarez
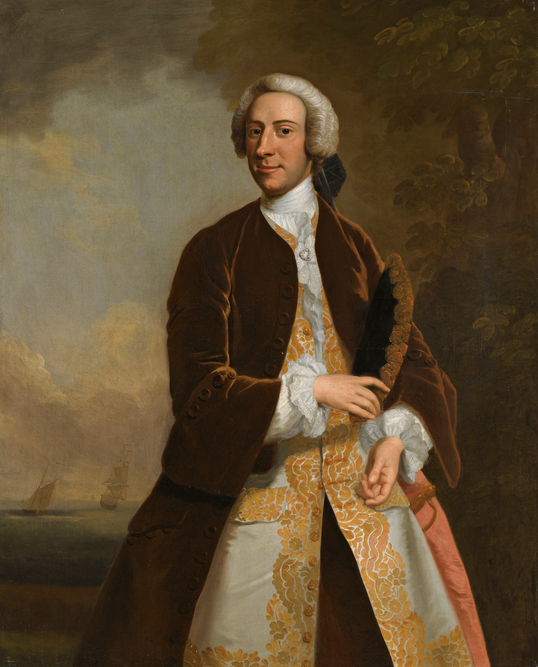
- Born: 17 November 1710; Saint Peter Port, Guernsey
- Died: 14 October 1747 (aged 36); Off Cape Finisterre, Atlantic Ocean
- Burial place: Westminster Abbey, London
- Relatives: James Saumarez, 1st Baron de Saumarez (nephew); Richard Saumarez (nephew); Thomas Saumarez (nephew)
- Military career
- Allegiance: Great Britain
- Branch: Royal Navy
- Service years: 1726–1747
- Rank: Captain
- Commands: HMS Nottingham
- Conflicts: War of Jenkins' Ear; Anson Expedition; First Battle of Cape Finisterre (1747); Second Battle of Cape Finisterre

Captain Philip de Saumarez (17 November 1710 – 14 October 1747) was a Royal Navy officer best known for his role in capturing the French ship Mars and as the first lieutenant of George Anson, 1st Baron Anson in his voyage around the world. He designed what would eventually be the first uniforms of the Royal Navy.

== Early life ==
Philip de Saumarez was born in 1710, to Matthew de Saumarez and Anne Durell, daughter of John Durell and Ann Dumaresq. Saumarez had many notable naval officers in his family. His uncle was Captain Thomas Durell, who was famous for the capture of the Spanish Princesa. His nephew was an even more famous de Saumarez, Admiral James Saumarez, 1st Baron de Saumarez. He was also cousins with Admiral Thomas Dumaresq and Vice-Admiral Philip Durell.

== Global expedition ==
Phillip de Saumarez served as first lieutenant on HMS Centurion under commodore George Anson, 1st Baron Anson, during his voyage around the world. As first lieutenant, Saumarez was very involved in the expedition, and at times took active command of Centurion, such as at the Isle of Tinian. Saumarez also took part in the boarding party and capture of the Spanish Nuestra Señora de Covadonga, and became its captain. During this expedition, Saumarez wrote logs for the Centurion that would later be used by author Leo Heaps in his novel Log of the Centurion: Based on the original papers of Captain Philip Saumarez on board HMS Centurion, Lord Anson's flagship during his circumnavigation, 1740–1744.

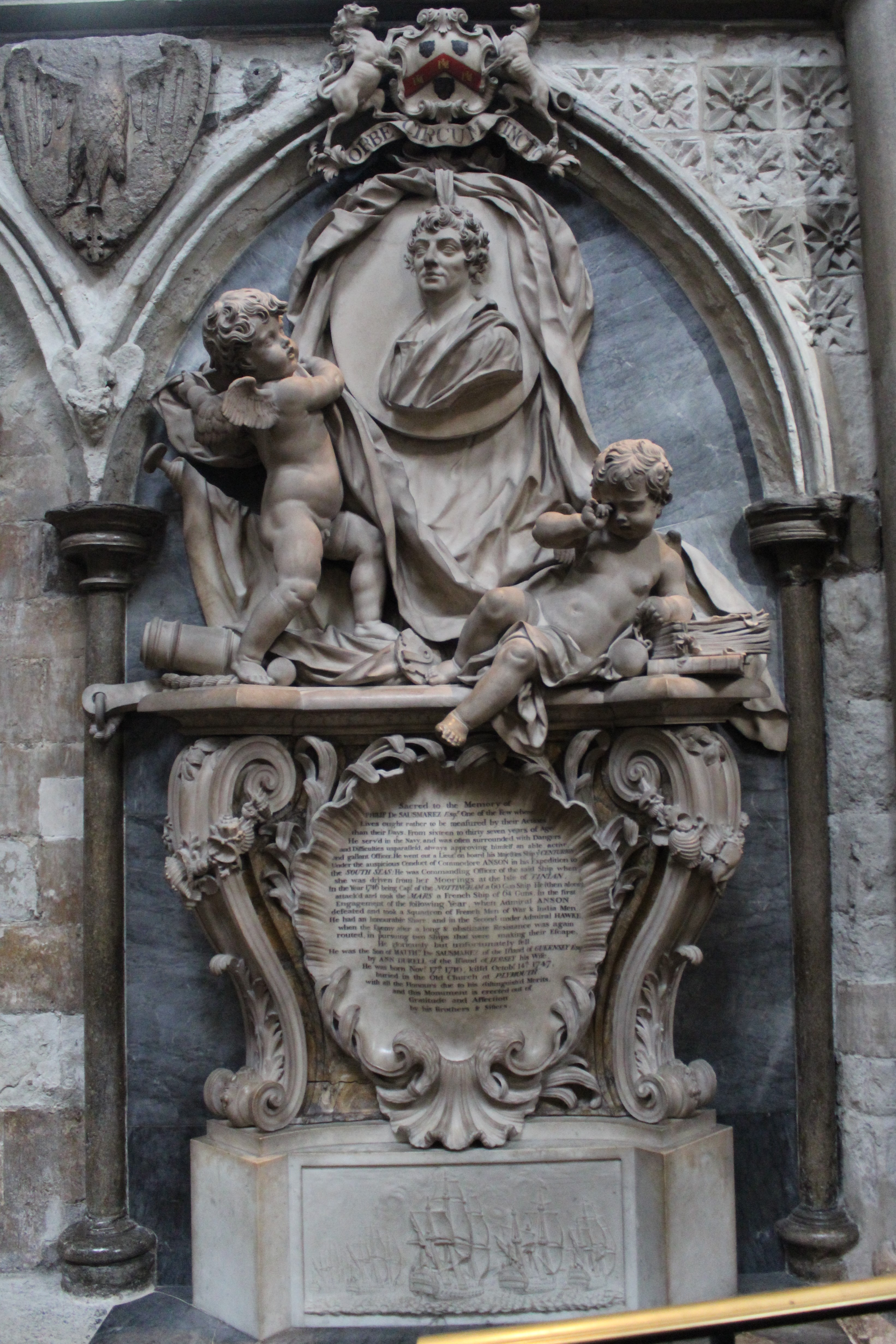
Memorial to Saumarez at Westminster Abbey

== Capture of the Mars ==
While captain of HMS Nottingham, Saumarez would be locked in combat with a French 64-gun ship, Mars. After two hours of combat, the Nottingham, under Saumarez, was able to capture the vessel and bring it to Plymouth.

== Naval uniforms ==
Philip Saumarez was the original designer of the very first naval officer uniforms for the Royal Navy, as George Anson and himself would experience the value of a uniform to symbolising service of the Crown while conducting their voyage around the world and meeting with dignitaries and officers of foreign nations. It is said that for one meeting in China the Officers resorted to wearing the uniforms of the Marines on board when such a meeting occurred. Saumarez would in large be the designer of these new uniforms, however he would die in battle before they were realised.

== Death ==
Captain Saumarez was killed in the Second Battle of Cape Finisterre while captain of HMS Nottingham under Rear-Admiral Edward Hawke, 1st Baron Hawke. Saumarez is said to have been killed at the end of the battle on October 14, 1747.

A monument was erected to his memory in Westminster Abbey sculpted by Henry Cheere.
