= Oued Ksob =

River in western Morocco

Coordinates: 31°28′N 9°44′W

- Bridge over Oued Ksob
- Native name: واد القصب (Arabic)

Location
- Country: Morocco

Oued Ksob is a river in western Morocco that discharges to the Atlantic Ocean on a broad beach slightly south of the city of Essaouira and slightly north of the village of Diabat. The mouth of the river, along with the nearby Iles Purpuraires, is known for sightings of the rare species Eleonora's falcon. To the south of the Ksob mouth is a ruined watchtower known as the Bordj El Berod.
