= Rosebush =

Rosebush may refer to:

- The rose plant
- Rosebush, Pembrokeshire, Wales
- Rosebush, Michigan, United States
- Rosebush (ship), a ship of the English Navy in the 1660s
