= Charles Cotterell (Royal Navy officer) =

Royal Navy officer (died 1754)

Rear-Admiral Charles Cotterell
- Died: 1754
- Military career
- Branch: Royal Navy
- Service years: 1712–1747
- Rank: Rear-Admiral
- Commands: HMS Happy; HMS Diamond; HMS Nottingham; HMS Princess Louisa; HMS Rose; HMS Lowestoffe; HMS Salisbury; HMS Rippon; HMS Canterbury; HMS Lion; HMS Royal Charles; Commander-in-Chief, The Nore
- Conflicts: War of Jenkins' Ear

Rear-Admiral Charles Cotterell (died 1754) was a Royal Navy officer who served as Commander-in-Chief, The Nore from 1744 to 1745.

== Naval career ==
Cotterell became commanding officer of the sloop HMS Happy in 1722. Promoted to captain in June 1726, he commanded, successively, the fifth-rate HMS Diamond, the fourth-rate HMS Nottingham, the fifth-rate HMS Princess Louisa, the sixth-rate HMS Rose, the fifth-rate HMS Lowestoffe, the fourth-rate HMS Salisbury, the fourth-rate HMS Rippon, the fourth-rate HMS Canterbury and the fourth-rate HMS Lion. He saw action at the battle of Cartagena de Indias in May 1741. After that he commanded the first-rate HMS Royal Charles and served as Commander-in-Chief, The Nore from 1744 to 1745. He died in 1754.
