= Harland baronets of Sproughton (1771) =

Escutcheon of the Harland baronets of Sproughton

The Harland baronetcy, of Sproughton in the County of Suffolk, was created in the Baronetage of Great Britain on 13 March 1771 for Admiral Robert Harland, subsequently a Lord of the Admiralty in 1782. The title became extinct on the death of his son, the second Baronet, in 1848.

== Harland baronets, of Sproughton (1771) ==
- Sir Robert Harland, 1st Baronet (1715–1784)
- Sir Robert Harland, 2nd Baronet (1765–1848)

== Notes ==
Baronetage of Great Britain
Preceded by Young baronets	Harland baronets of Sproughton; 13 March 1771	Succeeded by Cocks baronets
