= HMS Nottingham =

Four ships of the Royal Navy have borne the name HMS Nottingham, after the city of Nottingham in the East Midlands, or alternatively after Lord High Admiral Charles Howard, 1st Earl of Nottingham, who commanded the English fleet against the Spanish Armada in 1588. The first ship was rebuilt twice, and each is sometimes considered a separate ship:

- HMS Nottingham (1703) was a 60-gun fourth rate launched in 1703. She was rebuilt in 1719 and 1745, and was sunk in 1773 as a breakwater.
- HMS Nottingham (1794), was a 3-gun gunvessel, formerly a barge. She was purchased in 1796 and sold in 1800.
- HMS Nottingham (1913) was a Town-class cruiser launched in 1913 and sunk in 1916.
- HMS Nottingham (D91) was a batch two Type 42 destroyer launched in 1980, decommissioned in 2010 and scrapped from 2011.

== Battle honours ==
Ships named Nottingham have been awarded the following battle honours:

- Gibraltar, 1704
- Velez Malaga, 1704
- Marbella, 1705
- Finisterre, 1747
- Ushant, 1747
- Magnanime, 1748
- Louisburg, 1758
- Martinique, 1762
- Havana, 1762
- Heligoland, 1914
- Dogger Bank, 1915
- Jutland, 1916

== See also ==
- HMS Nottingham Prize
