= Listed buildings in Sproughton =

Civil Parish in Suffolk, England

Sproughton is a village and civil parish in the Babergh District of Suffolk, England. It contains 17 listed buildings that are recorded in the National Heritage List for England. Of these one is grade II* and 16 are grade II.

This list is based on the information retrieved online from Historic England.

== Key ==
Grade	Criteria
I	Buildings that are of exceptional interest
II*	Particularly important buildings of more than special interest
II	Buildings that are of special interest

== Listing ==
Name	Grade	Location	Type	Completed (Note: The date given is the date used by Historic England as significant for the initial building or that of an important part in the structure's description.)	Date designated	Grid ref. (Note: The grid reference is based on the British national grid reference system, sometimes known as OSGB36, used by the Ordnance Survey.) Geo-coordinates	Notes	Entry number (Note: The "List Entry Number" is a unique number assigned to each listed building and scheduled monument by Historic England.)	Image	Wikidata
Prync's Lodge	II				29 January 1988	TM1232244310; 52°03′23″N 1°05′44″E		1036921	Upload Photo	Q26288595
Sproughton Manor	II				6 March 1972	TM1278645616; 52°04′05″N 1°06′11″E		1036922	Upload Photo	Q26288596
1-4, Church Close	II	1-4, Church Close, Church Lane			22 February 1955	TM1246144997; 52°03′45″N 1°05′53″E		1036923	Upload Photo	Q26288597
Church of All Saints	II*	Church Lane	church building		22 February 1955	TM1251545029; 52°03′46″N 1°05′56″E		1285956	Church of All Saints More images	Q17534246
Barn Circa 20 Metres South East of Red House	II	Hadleigh Road			22 February 1955	TM1311643955; 52°03′11″N 1°06′25″E		1036924	Upload Photo	Q26288598
Red House	II	Hadleigh Road			22 February 1955	TM1308443953; 52°03′11″N 1°06′23″E		1285933	Upload Photo	Q26574585
Springvale	II	Hadleigh Road			29 January 1988	TM1265243737; 52°03′04″N 1°06′00″E		1193916	Upload Photo	Q26488556
The Wild Man	II	High Street	pub		29 January 1988	TM1223944979; 52°03′45″N 1°05′41″E		1351646	The Wild Man More images	Q26634729
2 and 4, Lower Street	II	2 and 4, Lower Street			22 February 1955	TM1227644978; 52°03′45″N 1°05′43″E		1193924	Upload Photo	Q26488563
Walnut Cottage	II	7, Lower Street			29 January 1988	TM1230745010; 52°03′46″N 1°05′45″E		1193937	Upload Photo	Q26488576
Barn About 50 Metres South West of Sproughton Hall	II	Lower Street			22 February 1955	TM1240445072; 52°03′48″N 1°05′50″E		1351647	Upload Photo	Q26634730
Lower House and the Stores	II	Lower Street			29 January 1988	TM1231844992; 52°03′45″N 1°05′45″E		1036925	Upload Photo	Q26288599
Mill	II	Lower Street			29 January 1988	TM1248345102; 52°03′49″N 1°05′54″E		1036927	Upload Photo	Q26288601
Mill House	II	Lower Street			29 January 1988	TM1247745079; 52°03′48″N 1°05′54″E		1193955	Upload Photo	Q26488595
Sproughton Hall	II	Lower Street			22 February 1955	TM1241845122; 52°03′49″N 1°05′51″E		1285915	Upload Photo	Q26574570
Tithe Barn	II	Lower Street			29 January 1988	TM1242945050; 52°03′47″N 1°05′51″E		1036926	Upload Photo	Q26288600
Poplar Farmhouse	II	Poplar Lane			29 January 1988	TM1263043211; 52°02′47″N 1°05′58″E		1193985	Upload Photo	Q26488624

== See also ==
- Grade I listed buildings in Suffolk
- Grade II* listed buildings in Suffolk

== Sources ==
- Bettely, James; Pevsner, Nikolaus (2015) [1961], Suffolk: West, The Buildings of England, New Haven and London: Yale University Press, ISBN 978-0-300-19655-9
