= Diabat =

Coordinates: 31°29′N 9°46′W

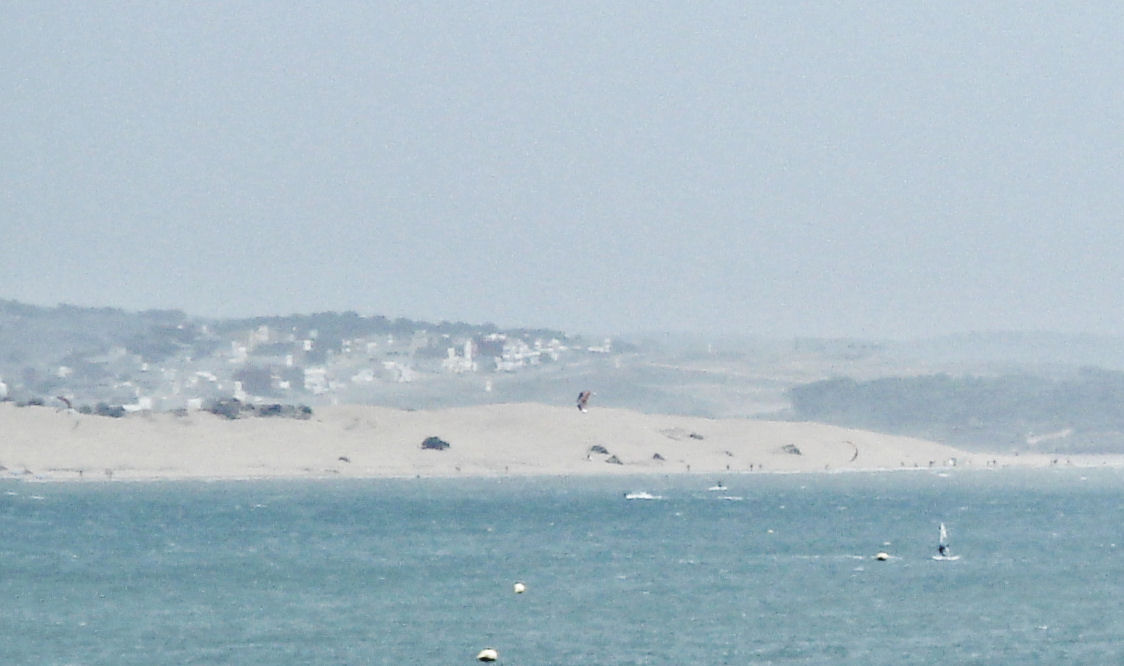
Village of Diabat seen from the north, from Essaouira.

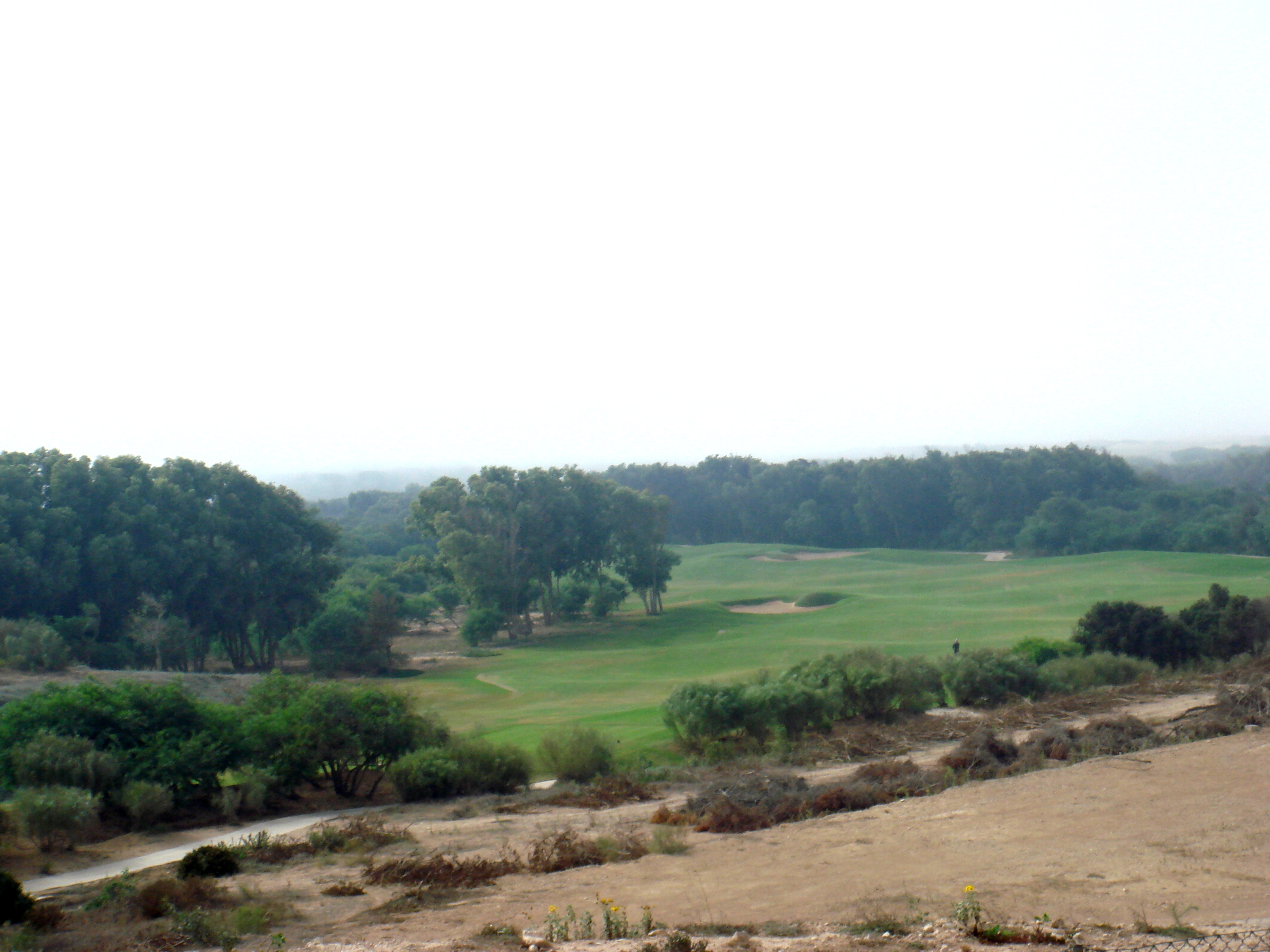
The new golf course in front of Diabat (under construction).

Diabat is a village in western Morocco near the coast of the Atlantic Ocean about five kilometres south of the city of Essaouira. (Ellingham, 2007) The Bordj El Berod is a ruined watchtower located somewhat south of the mouth of Oued Ksob (Hogan, 2007) near about one kilometre west of Diabat.

== See also ==
- Diabatic representation (Energy surfaces in Quantum Mechanics)
- Oued Ksob
- Bordj El Berod

== Literature ==
- TAST, Brigitte; TAST, Hans-Juergen. Still the wind cries Jimi. Hendrix in Marokko, Schellerten, 2012, ISBN 978-3-88842-040-5
