= HMS Shoreham (1694) =

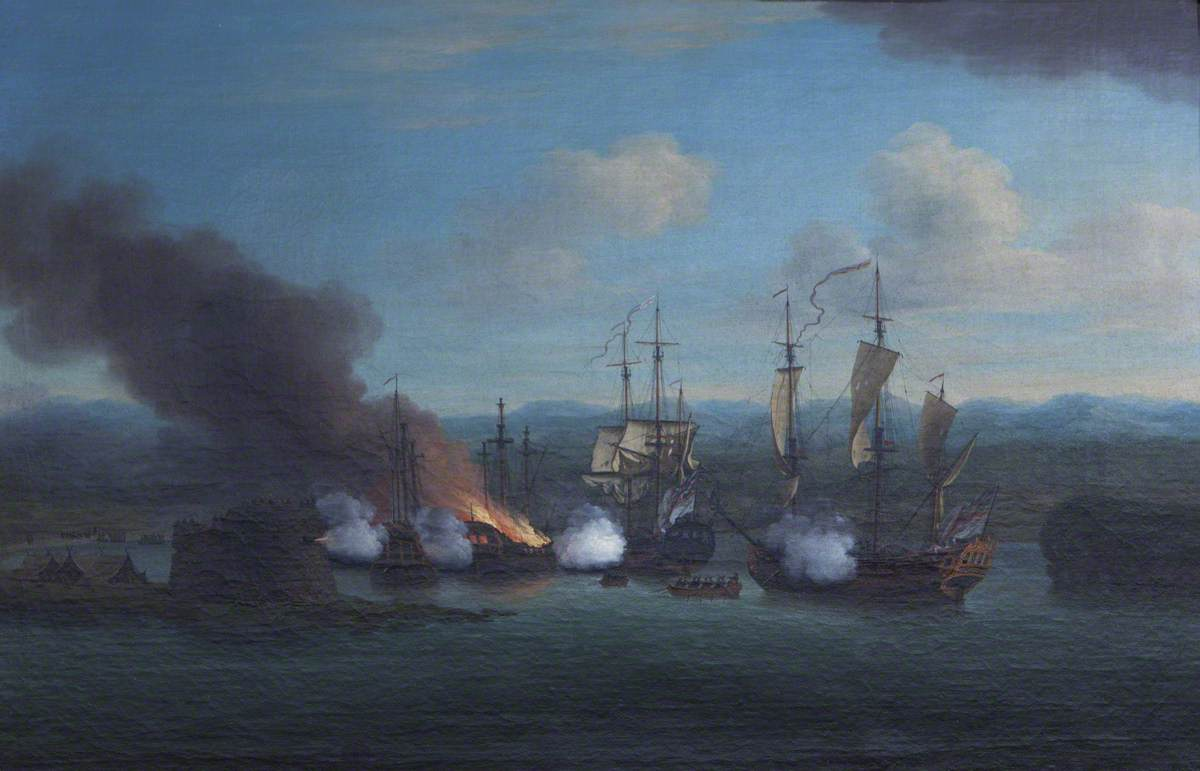
- Shoreham and HMS Rose engaging two Salé Rovers off Mogador Island in 1734

History

England
- Name: HMS Shoreham
- Ordered: 17 February 1693
- Builder: Thomas Ellis, Shoreham
- Launched: 6 January 1694
- Commissioned: January 1694

General characteristics as built
- Class & type: 30-gun fifth rate
- Tons burthen: 3608/94 tons (bm)
- Length: 103 ft 0 in (31.39 m) gundeck; 85 ft 7 in (26.09 m) keel for tonnage
- Beam: 28 ft 1.5 in (8.573 m)
- Depth of hold: 10 ft 8 in (3.25 m)
- Propulsion: Sails
- Sail plan: Full-rigged ship
- Armament: 1703 Establishment 32/28 guns; 4/4 × demi-culverins (LD); 22/20 × 6-pdr guns (UD); 6/4 × 4-pdr guns(QD)

General characteristics 1719/21 rebuild
- Class & type: 20-gun sixth rate
- Tons burthen: 37964/94 tons (bm)
- Length: 106 ft 0 in (32.31 m) gundeck; 88 ft 11 in (27.10 m) keel for tonnage
- Beam: 28 ft 4 in (8.64 m)
- Depth of hold: 9 ft 2 in (2.79 m)
- Propulsion: Sails
- Sail plan: Full-rigged ship
- Armament: 1719 Establishment 20 guns; 20 × 6-pdr guns (UD)

HMS Shoreham was a 32-gun fifth-rate frigate of the Royal Navy built under contract at Shoreham in 1693/94. During the Nine Years' War, she was involved in the unsuccessful operation at Camaret Bay (near Brest). At the end of the war she helped take half a French convoy off Ireland. She then deployed to North America and the West Indies. She was rebuilt as a 20-gun sixth rate to the 1719 Establishment in 1719/21. She served in the Baltic as a bomb vessel then reverted to a sixth rate. She participated in operations in the West Indies during the initial years of the War of Austrian Succession before being sold in 1744. She was the first vessel to bear the name Shoreham in the Royal Navy.

== Construction and specifications ==
She was ordered on 17 February 1693 to be built under contract by Thomas Ellis of Shoreham. She was launched on 6 January 1694. Her dimensions were a gundeck of 103 feet 0 inches (31.39 metres) with a keel of 85 feet 7 inches (26.09 metres) for tonnage calculation with a breadth of 28 feet 1.5 inches (8.57 metres) and a depth of hold of 10 feet 8 inches (3.25 metres). Her builder's measure tonnage was calculated as 3608/94 tons (burthen).

The gun armament initially was four demi-culverins (Note: A demi-culverin was a gun of 3,400 pounds with a four-inch bore firing a 9.5-pound shot with an eight-pound powder charge) mounted on wooden trucks on the lower deck (LD) with two pair of guns per side. The upper deck (UD) battery would consist of between twenty and twenty-two sakers (Note: A sacar or saker was a gun of 1,400 pounds with a 3.5-inch bore firing a 5.5-pound shot with a 5.5-pound powder charge.) guns mounted on wooden trucks with ten or eleven guns per side. The gun battery would be completed by four to six minions (Note: A minion was a gun of 1,000 pounds with a 3.5-inch bore firing a 4-pound shot with a 4-pound powder charge.) guns mounted on wooden trucks on the quarterdeck (QD) with two to three guns per side.

== Commissioned service ==
=== Service 1694-1719 ===
She was commissioned in January 1694 under the command of Captain John Constable. She was a member of a division under the Marquis of Carmarthen sent to Camaret Bay (near Brest) on 8 June 1694 to provide fire support for the possible landing of troops. At 7am the troops enter their boats for the landing and the squadron commenced the bombardment. The troops were withdrawn after the loss of half the force and the 32-gun Dutch vessel, the Wesp. She took the French 6-gun corvette La Farouche on 25 July 1695. In 1697 she was under the command of Captain Philip Dawes. Captain William Passenger was in command from 1699 to 1704. She was in North America and the West Indies 1700/01 and Ireland 1703/04. During March/April 1700 she took a 20-gun pirate vessel and retook the two merchantmen that were with her. Captain George Saunders held command from January 1705 until 1709. While on the Irish Station while sailing with HMS Speedwell, they fell in with a group of ten French Merchantmen sailing to the West Indies. The two British ships took five of the French merchantmen. She took the French privateer L'Esperance on 19 May 1709. Captain John Furzer took command in March 1710 followed by Captain Charles Hardy while the ship remained on the Irish Station. In February 1713 she was assigned Captain Edward Falkingham for service at New York. She was paid off in 1713. She underwent a great repair at Sheerness at a cost of £1,985.8.2d (Note: A total cost accounting for inflation of approximately £375,000 in today's money) between February 1714 and February 1715. She was recommissioned in January 1715 under the command of Captain Thomas Howard for service in Virginia. She returned in 1718 and was dismantled at Woolwich on 21 October 1719 for rebuilding as a sixth rate.

=== Rebuild as sixth rate at Woolwich Dockyard 1719-1721 ===
She was ordered rebuilt on 10 November 1719 under the 1719 Establishment as a sixth rate at Woolwich Dockyard under the guidance of Master Shipwright John Hayward. Her keel was laid in October 1719 and launched on 25 August 1720. Her dimensions were a gundeck of 106 feet 0 inches (32.31 metres) with a keel of 88 feet 11 inches (27.10 metres) for tonnage calculation with a breadth of 28 feet 4 inches (8.64 metres) and a depth of hold of 9 feet 2 inches (2.79 metres). Her builder's measure tonnage was calculated as 37964/94 tons (burthen). Her armament was changed to the 1719 Establishment for a sixth rate ship. She carried twenty 6-pounder guns on the upper deck (UD).

=== Service 1721-1743 ===
She was commissioned in 1721 under the command of Captain Coville Mayne, who held command until 1724, for service in the East Indies. She was fitted as a bomb-vessel by Admiralty Order (AO) March 1727 at a cost of 1,403.7.1d. She was commissioned in March 1727 as a bomb-vessel under the command of Captain Robert Long for service in the Baltic. After returning from the Baltic she was restored to a 20-gun sixth rate, then sailed to New York during 1728/30. She underwent a great repair at Deptford at a cost of £4,463.2.11d (Note: A total cost accounting for inflation of approximately £896,800 in today's money) between October 1730 and May 1731 then fitted for the West Indies. In April 1731 she was commissioned under the command of Captain Thomas Griffin (until the end of 1732) for service at Jamaica. She was under Captain John Towry in November 1732. Upon her return in 1732 she underwent a small repair and fitting at Deptford costing £943.14.5d (Note: A total cost accounting for inflation of approximately £194,200 in today's money) from May to December 1733. Still under Captain Towry she was off the Portuguese coast in 1734. She then sailed to Newfoundland for the period of 1735 to 1737. Her hull was sheathed against marine growth with a new composition In April/May 1737. She was fitted at Deptford for £4,183 (Note: A total cost accounting for inflation of approximately £842,800 in today's money) between April and August 1738.

In 1738 she was under the command of Commander Edward Boscawen for service in the West Indies in 1739. Shoreham joined Commodore Charles Brown's Squadron at Jamaica on 6 August. Commodore Brown carried out reprisals and a reconnaissance in force leaving Port Royal, Jamaica on the 14th for a cruise around Cuba. During this cruise, the Shoreham was the most successful. She carried out a scouting of the Port of Havana, destroyed two sloops and took another. On 15 September she carried out a landing at Porto Maria and destroyed a large quantity of Lumber and other stores. She was attack by two half-galleys and a sloop. The Spanish vessels remained in shallow water and Shoreham was not able to close with them. She went aground near Cape Antonio in October 1739 and was salved. She participated in the Georgia operations in April to June 1740. In March 1741 she was under the command of Captain Thomas Broderick for continued service at Jamaica. She participated in operations around Santiago de Cuba. She returned home in 1742 to pay off.

== Disposition ==
Under Admiralty Order (AO) 19 May 1743 she was ordered to have a new ship built in her room (replace by new construction). She was sold under AO 23 May 1744 for £195 (Note: A total cost accounting for inflation of approximately £42,000 in today's money) on 5 June 1744.
