= HMS Lowestoffe (1697) =

History

England
- Name: HMS Lowestoffe
- Ordered: 24 December 1696
- Builder: Chatham Dockyard
- Launched: 7 August 1697
- Commissioned: 1699
- Fate: Sold 12 July 1744

General characteristics as built
- Class & type: 32-gun fifth rate
- Tons burthen: 35688/94 tons (bm)
- Length: 104 ft 4 in (31.80 m) gundeck; 87 ft 8 in (26.72 m) keel for tonnage
- Beam: 27 ft 8 in (8.43 m)
- Depth of hold: 10 ft 4 in (3.15 m)
- Propulsion: Sails
- Sail plan: Full-rigged ship
- Complement: 145/110
- Armament: as built 32 guns; 4/4 × demi-culverins (LD); 22/20 × 6-pdr guns (UD); 6/4 × 4-pdr guns (QD)

General characteristics 1719 Establishment
- Class & type: 20-gun sixth rate
- Tons burthen: 37790/94 tons (bm)
- Length: 106 ft 3 in (32.39 m) gundeck; 88 ft 0 in (26.82 m) keel for tonnage
- Beam: 28 ft 5 in (8.66 m)
- Depth of hold: 9 ft 2 in (2.79 m)
- Propulsion: Sails
- Sail plan: Full-rigged ship
- Armament: 1719 Establishment 20 guns; 20 × 6-pdr guns (UD)

HMS Lowestoffe was a 32-gun fifth rate built at Chatham Dockyard in 1696/97. She spent her career on counter piracy patrols and trade Protection duties. She participated in the capture of Port Royal in Nova Scotia. She was rebuilt in 1722/24 as a 20-gun sixth rate. She was sold in July 1744.

She was the first vessel to bear the name Lowestoffe or Lowestoft in the English and Royal Navy.

== Construction and specifications ==
She was ordered on 24 December 1696 to be built at Chatham Dockyard under the guidance of Master Shipwright Robert Lee. She was launched on 7 August 1697. Her dimensions were a gundeck of 104 feet 4 inches (31.80 metres) with a keel of 87 feet 8 inches (26.72 metres) for tonnage calculation with a breadth of 27 feet 8 inches (8.43 metres) and a depth of hold of 10 feet 4 inches (3.15 metres). Her builder's measure tonnage was calculated as 35688/94 tons (burthen).

The gun armament initially was four demi-culverins (Note: A demi-culverin was a gun of 3,400 pounds with a four-inch bore firing a 9.5-pound shot with an eight-pound powder charge) on the lower deck (LD) with two pair of guns per side. The upper deck (UD) battery would consist of between twenty and twenty-two 6-pounder guns (Note: A 6-pounder was a Dutch gun used to replace the saker) with ten or eleven guns per side. The gun battery would be completed by four 4-pounder guns (Note: A minion renamed the 4-pounder was a gun of 1,000 pounds with a 3.5-inch bore firing a 4-pound shot with a 4-pound powder charge.) on the quarterdeck (QD) with two to three guns per side.

== Commissioned service ==
=== Service 1699-1722 ===
HMS Lowestoffe was commissioned around 1699 under the command of Captain John Underdown. She was at the Isle of Man in 1699 and then sailed to the Baltic Sea in 1700. She sailed with the Fleet in 1701/02. Captain Rupert Billingsley was her commander sailing to Guinea on the East Coast of Africa in 1703. Captain Charles Stukely took command off the Guinea coast in July 1703. Around July 1704 Captain George Fane took over for a voyage to New York. He held command until his death on 8 April 1709 then Captain George Gordon assumed command al New York. She participated in the capture of Port Royal on the Bay of Fundy. The attack occurred on the 26th and the town capitulated on the 2nd of October 1711. Port Royal was renamed Annapolis Royal. She returned Home in 1712. She underwent a middling repair at Sheerness at a cost of £102.14.8d (Note: A total cost accounting for inflation of approximately £18,200 in today's money) from May to June 1712. Upon completion she sailed to Bermuda in 1713. In 1717 she was under Captain Sir Hugh Middleton for service in the Baltic during 1717/18. She was dismantled at Portsmouth on 17 February 1722 with the intent of rebuilding as a 20-gun sixth rate.

=== Rebuild at Portsmouth 1722-24 ===
She was ordered rebuilt on 13 September 1722 at Portsmouth Dockyard under the guidance of Master Shipwright John Naish. As per Admiralty Order 13 September 1723 her rebuild was change to a 20-gun sixth rate in accordance to the 1719 establishment. Her keel was laid in July 1723 and launched on 18 December 1723. Her dimensions were a gundeck of 106 feet 3 inches (32.39 metres) with a keel of 88 feet 0 inches (26.82 metres) for tonnage calculation with a breadth of 28 feet 5 inches (8.66 metres) and a depth of hold of 9 feet 2 inches (2.79 metres). Her builder's measure tonnage was calculated as 37790/94 tons (burthen). Her gun armament was in accordance with the 1719 Establishment for a 20-gun sixth rate consisting of twenty 6-pounder guns on the upper Deck (UD) She was completed for sea on 21 May 1724 at a cost of £3,362.15.8d (Note: A total cost accounting for inflation of approximately £638,200 in today's money) to build and £2,475.9.1d (Note: A total cost accounting for inflation of approximately £469,900 in today's money) for fitting.

=== Service 1724-1744 ===
She was commissioned in April 1724 under the command of Captain Matthew Norris for service at New York. She was ordered to Home Waters in 1728. She was then sent to the Mediterranean followed by a deployment to South Carolina during 1730/31. She returned Home and paid off in August 1732. She was recommissioned in January 1733 under Captain Charles Wyndham for service in the North Sea and subsequently for convoy service for Russian trade. Later Captain Charles Cotterell took command until 1735. She underwent a great repair and fitting At Deptford between June 1735 and March 1736 costing £4,915.13.3d. (Note: A total cost accounting for inflation of approximately £932,900 in today's money) She was then recommissioned in January 1736 under Captain Charles Drummond for service in the Leeward Islands, returning to England in 1741.

== Disposition ==
She was surveyed in August 1741 and a new vessel was ordered to be built in her room under Admiralty Order (AO) 24 August 1741. She was sold by AO 16 June 1744 for £518 (Note: A total cost accounting for inflation of approximately £111,400 in today's money) on 12 July 1744.
