= Sir Robert Harland, 1st Baronet =

Royal Navy officer (1715–1784)

Admiral of the Blue Sir Robert Harland Bt
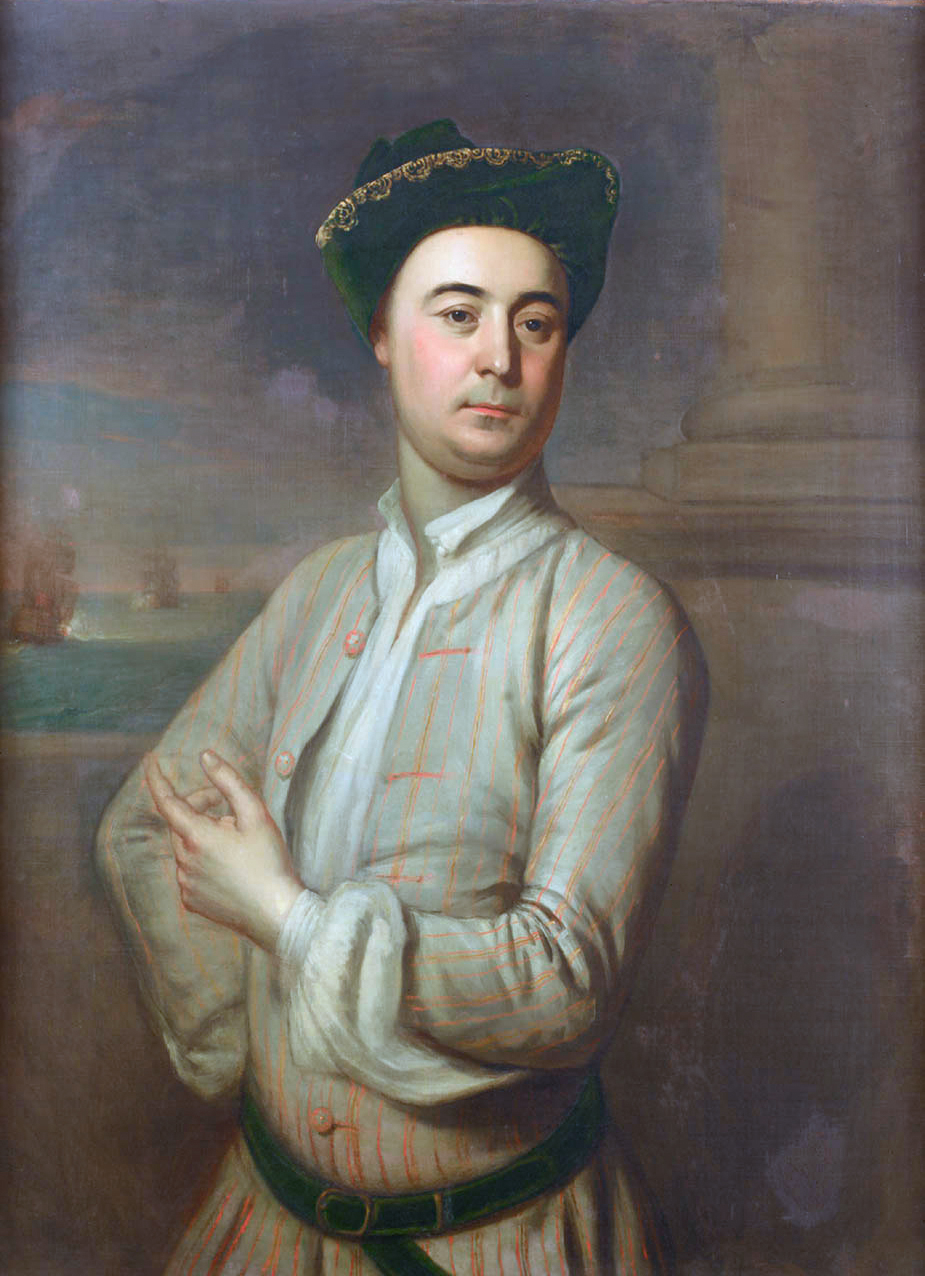
- Portrait attributed to John Theodore Heins, c. 1747–1748
- Born: c. 1715
- Died: 21 February 1784 (aged 68–69) Sproughton, Suffolk
- Allegiance: Great Britain
- Branch: Royal Navy
- Service years: 1729–1783
- Rank: Admiral of the Blue
- Commands: HMS Scipio; HMS Tilbury; HMS Nottingham; HMS Monarch; HMS Essex; HMS Conqueror; HMS Princess Louisa; East Indies Station
- Conflicts: War of the Austrian Succession; Battle of Toulon (1744); Second Battle of Cape Finisterre; Action of 31 January 1748; Seven Years' War; Battle of Lagos; American War of Independence; Battle of Ushant (1778)

Admiral of the Blue Sir Robert Harland, 1st Baronet (c. 1715 – 21 February 1784) was a Royal Navy officer who served in the War of the Austrian Succession, Seven Years' War and American War of Independence. He commanded HMS Tilbury at the Second Battle of Cape Finisterre and HMS Princess Louisa at the Battle of Lagos. Harland went on to serve as Commander-in-Chief, East Indies and subsequently as First Naval Lord.

== Life ==
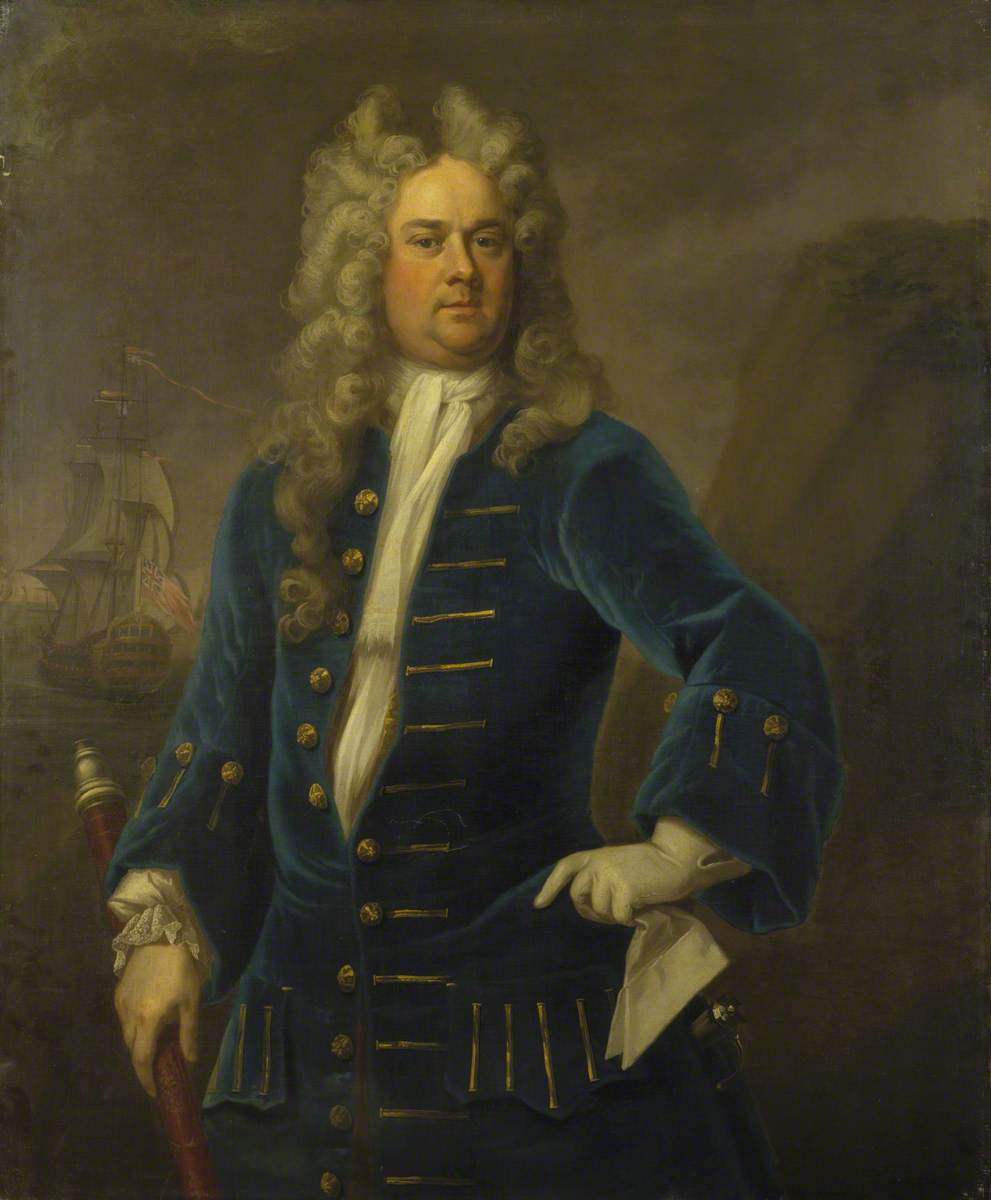
Portrait of Harland's father Robert

Robert Harland was born in c. 1715, the son of Captain Robert Harland of the Royal Navy. Harland followed his father's career and joined the British navy on 24 April 1729 as a volunteer-per-order on HMS Falkland. He was promoted to lieutenant on 24 February 1741 and served on HMS Princessa at the Battle of Toulon on 11 February 1744. Harland was promoted to master and commander and given command of HMS Scipio on 4 January 1745 and was promoted again to post-captain and made the captain of HMS Tilbury on 19 March 1746, commanding her at Second Battle of Cape Finisterre on 14 October 1747.

Harland was appointed to HMS Nottingham later that year and the following year had a major role in the capture of the French 74-gun Magnanime on 31 January 1748. He commanded HMS Monarch from 1748 and HMS Essex from 1755 before transferring to HMS Conqueror in 1758. In 1759 he transferred to HMS Princess Louisa and took part in the Battle of Lagos on 18 August 1759.

On 18 October 1770, Harland was promoted to Rear-Admiral of the Blue and in 1771 was appointed as Commander-in-Chief, East Indies, serving in the East Indies until 1775. He was given a baronetcy on 19 March 1771. Harland was subsequently promoted to Rear-Admiral of the Red on 31 March 1775, Vice-Admiral of the Blue on 7 December 1775 and Vice-Admiral of the White on 2 April 1776. He was further promoted to Vice-Admiral of the Red on 12 May 1778 and became second-in-command of the Channel Fleet, fighting at the Battle of Ushant on 27 July.

Harland was appointed to the Board of Admiralty in the second Rockingham ministry in April 1782. He was made First Naval Lord on 1 April 1782 and was promoted to Admiral of the Blue on 8 April, continuing to serve as First Naval Lord until 30 January 1783. He died at his home in Sproughton in Suffolk on 21 February 1784.

== Family ==
In 1749 he married Susanna Reynold; they had three daughters and a son.

== Sources ==
- Cock, Randolph (2004). "Sir Robert Harland, 1st Baronet". Oxford Dictionary of National Biography. Oxford Dictionary of National Biography (online ed.). Oxford University Press. doi:10.1093/ref:odnb/12333. (Subscription, Wikipedia Library access or UK public library membership required.)
- Laughton, John Knox (1890). "Harland, Robert" . In Stephen, Leslie; Lee, Sidney (eds.). Dictionary of National Biography. Vol. 24. London: Smith, Elder & Co.
- Rodger, N.A.M. (1979). The Admiralty. Offices of State. Lavenham: T. Dalton Ltd. ISBN 0900963948.

Military offices
Preceded by John Lindsay	Commander-in-Chief, East Indies Station; 1771–1775	Succeeded by Edward Hughes
Preceded by George Darby	First Naval Lord; 1782–1783	Succeeded by Hugh Pigot
Baronetage of Great Britain
New creation	Baronet (of Sproughton); 1771–1784	Succeeded by Robert Harland
