= HMS Rose (1712) =

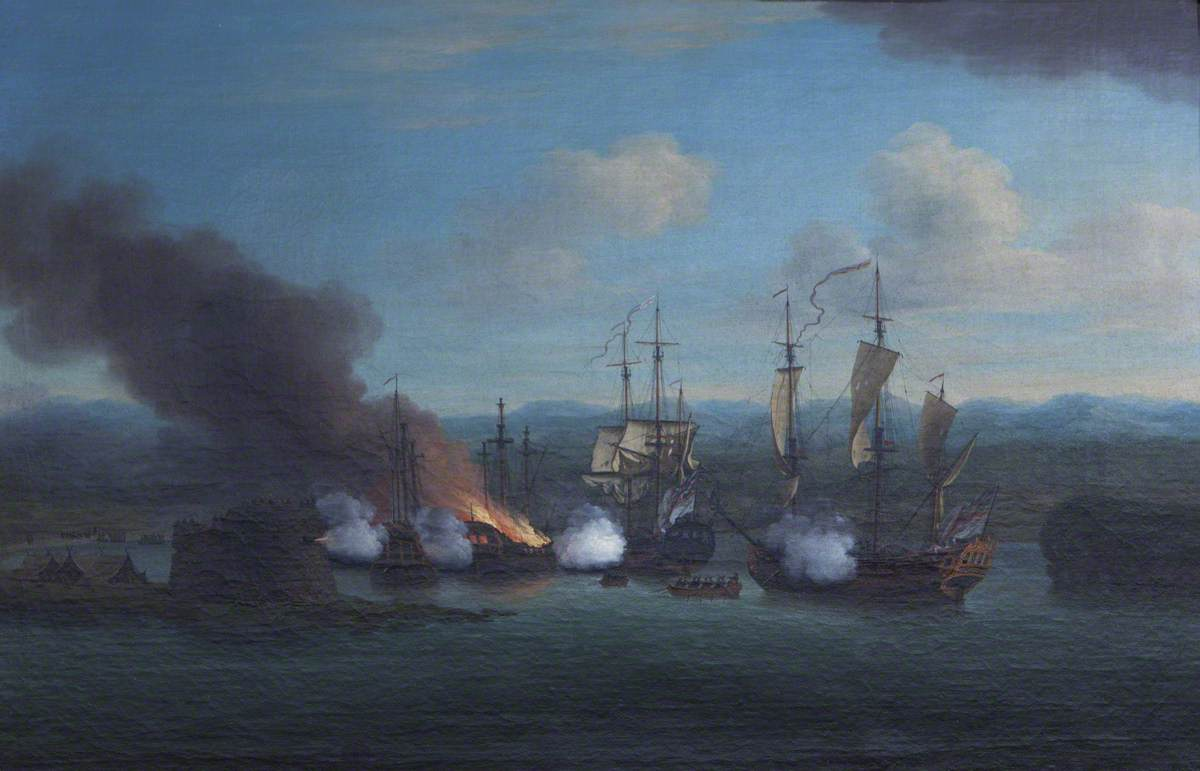
- Rose and HMS Shoreham engaging two Salé Rovers off Mogador Island in 1734

History

Great Britain
- Name: HMS Rose
- Ordered: 29 September 1711
- Builder: Royal Dockyard, Chatham
- Launched: 25 April 1712
- Commissioned: 1712
- Fate: Sold 5 June 1744

General characteristics
- Type: 24-gun Sixth Rate
- Tons burthen: 273 26/94 bm
- Length: 94 ft 0 in (28.7 m) gundeck; 76 ft 0 in (23.2 m) keel for tonnage
- Beam: 26 ft 0 in (7.9 m) for tonnage
- Depth of hold: 11 ft 6 in (3.5 m)
- Sail plan: ship-rigged
- Armament: 20 × 6-pdr 19 cwt guns on wooden trucks (UD); 4 × 4-pdr 12 cwt guns on wooden trucks (QD)

General characteristics as rebuilt 1727
- Type: 20-gun Sixth Rate
- Tons burthen: 376 85/94 bm
- Length: 106 ft 0 in (32.3 m) gundeck; 87 ft 9 in (26.7 m) keel for tonnage
- Beam: 28 ft 5 in (8.7 m) for tonnage
- Depth of hold: 9 ft 2 in (2.8 m)
- Sail plan: ship-rigged
- Armament: 20 × 6-pdr 19 cwt guns on wooden trucks (UD)

HMS Rose was a 24-gun sixth-rate frigate of the Royal Navy. After commissioning she spent her career in Home waters and North America on trade protection duties. She was rebuilt at Woolwich between 1722 and 1724. After her rebuild she served in Home Waters, North America, West Indies and the Mediterranean on trade protection. She was sold in 1744. Rose was the eleventh vessel so named, the first being a 'King's ship' 1222.

== Construction ==
She was ordered on 29 September 1711 from Chatham Dockyard to be built under the guidance of Benjamin Rosewell, Master Shipwright of Woolwich. She was launched on 25 April 1712. She was completed on 16 May 1712.

== Commissioned service ==
She was commissioned in 1712 under the command of Commander Trywit Cyley, RN (promoted to Captain January 1713) for service in the North Sea, then to New England 1715 thru 1716. She returned in 1718 for a small repair at Deptford from February to March 1718 at a cost of £1,648.9.0d. (Note: A total cost accounting for inflation of approximately £311,800 in today's money.) Upon completion she was commissioned under Captain Thomas Whitney, RN for service in the Leeward Islands. She returned Home and was surveyed at Deptford in 1722. She was removed to Woolwich on 10 November 1722.

== Rebuild at Woolwich 1722 - 1724 ==
She was dismantled at Woolwich in preparation for rebuilding as a 374 tom 20-gun sixth rate under the guidance of John Hayward, Master Shipwright of Woolwich. She was launched on 8 September 1724. The dimensions after rebuild were gundeck 106 feet 0 inches (32.3 metres) with a keel length of 87 feet 9 inches (26.7 metres) for tonnage calculation. The breadth would be 28 feet 5 inches (8.7 metres) with a depth of hold of 9 ft 2 in (2.8 m). The tonnage calculation would be 37685/94 tons. The gun armament as established in 1713 would be twenty 6-pounder 19 hundredweight (cwt) guns mounted on wooden trucks. She was completed for sea on 23 May 1725.

== Commissioned Service after Rebuild ==
She was commissioned in 1725 under the command of Captain Mungo Herdman, RN for service off the Scottish coast. Captain Herdman died on 8 March 1728. Captain John Weller, RN took over in March 1727 for service in the English Channel. She sailed to Newfoundland in 1729 then moved on to the Mediterranean in 1730. She returned home paying off on 27 December 1731. She underwent a small repair and fitted for foreign service at Portsmouth for £1,023.6.8d (Note: A total cost accounting for inflation of approximately £218,800 in today's money.) from January to May 1732. She was recommissioned in 1732 under Captain Charles Cotterell, RN for service in the English Channel. In January 1733 she came under Captain Charles Wyndham, RN for the Barbary Coast. She went to South Carolina from 1735 thru 1738. She returned home to pay off on 15 December 1738. She was reclassified as a hulk by Admiralty Order (AO) 4 October 1739.

== Disposition ==
HMS Rose was sold by Admiralty Order (AO) 23 May 1744 for £150 (Note: A total cost accounting for inflation of approximately £28,400 in today's money.) on 5 June 1744.
