= Young baronets of Dominica (1769) =

Escutcheon of the Young baronets of Dominica

The Young baronetcy, of Dominica, was created in the Baronetage of Great Britain on 2 May 1769 for William Young, Lieutenant-Governor of Dominica. The 2nd Baronet served as Governor of Tobago, while the 4th Baronet sat as Member of Parliament for Buckinghamshire.

The 5th Baronet was killed at the Battle of Alma in the Crimean War while his younger brother, the 6th Baronet, died during the Siege of Sevastopol in the same conflict. The 9th Baronet was Envoy Extraordinary to Guatemala and Yugoslavia.

== Young baronets, of Dominica (1769) ==
- Sir William Young, 1st Baronet (1725–1788)
- Sir William Young, 2nd Baronet (c. 1750–1815)
- Sir William Lawrence Young, 3rd Baronet (c. 1778–1824)
- Sir William Lawrence Young, 4th Baronet (1806–1842)
- Sir William Norris Young, 5th Baronet (1833–1854)
- Sir George John Young, 6th Baronet (1835–1854)
- Sir Charles Lawrence Young, 7th Baronet (1839–1887)
- Sir William Lawrence Young, 8th Baronet (1864–1921)
- Sir (Charles) Alban Young, 9th Baronet (1865–1944)
- Sir William Neil Young, 10th Baronet (born 1941)

The heir apparent is the present holder's son William Lawrence Elliot Young (born 1970).

== Notes ==
Baronetage of Great Britain
Preceded by Alleyne baronets	Young baronets of Dominica; 2 May 1769	Succeeded by Harland baronets
