= French ship Mars (1740) =

Ship of the line of the French Navy

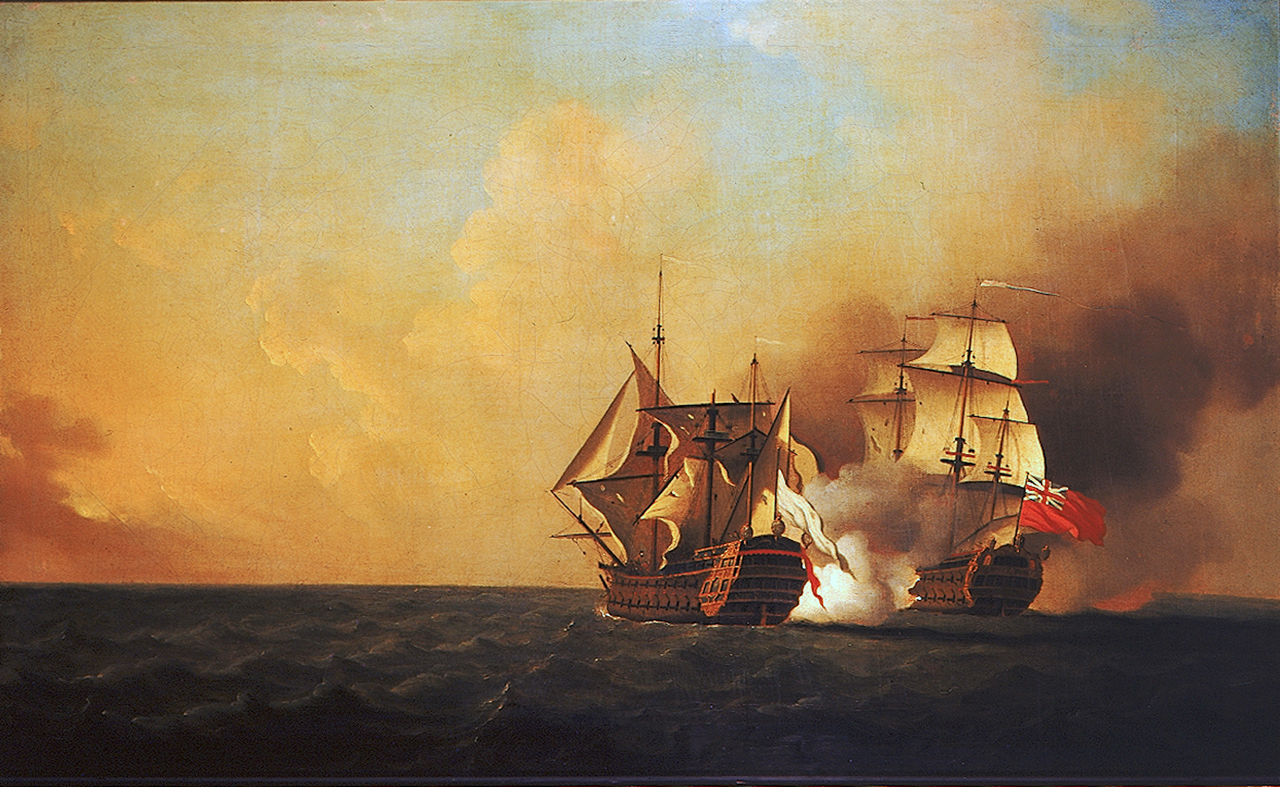
- Mars (left) being captured by HMS Nottingham on 11 October 1746

History

France
- Name: Mars
- Namesake: Mars (mythology)
- Builder: Brest
- Laid down: January 1739
- Launched: May 1740
- Commissioned: April 1741
- Fate: Captured by HMS Nottingham in 1746

Great Britain
- Name: HMS Mars
- Acquired: October 1746
- Commissioned: March 1747
- Fate: Wrecked in 1755

General characteristics
- Displacement: 2000 tonneaux
- Tons burthen: 1100 port tonneaux
- Propulsion: Sail
- Sail plan: ship-rigged

Mars was a 64-gun ship of the line of the French Navy. She was captured by HMS Nottingham off Cape Clear Island in 1746. She was taken into Royal Navy service as the third-rate ship of the line HMS Mars and was wrecked in 1755 near Halifax, Nova Scotia.

== French service ==
She took part in the action that took HMS Northumberland off Ushant on 8 May 1744. As she was returning from the failed Duc d'Anville expedition, Mars was captured by HMS Nottingham under Captain Philip Saumarez off Cape Clear Island on 11 October 1746.

== British service ==
Commissioned in March 1747, under the command of Captain Edward Hawke.

Francis Light, founder of Penang, began his Royal Navy service as a surgeon's mate on Mars in February 1754.

While on a voyage from Portsmouth to Louisbourg, Nova Scotia, she was wrecked on 25 June 1755 on a rock (now known as Mars Rock) near Halifax Harbour.
