= Salé Rovers =

17th-century band of Barbary corsairs

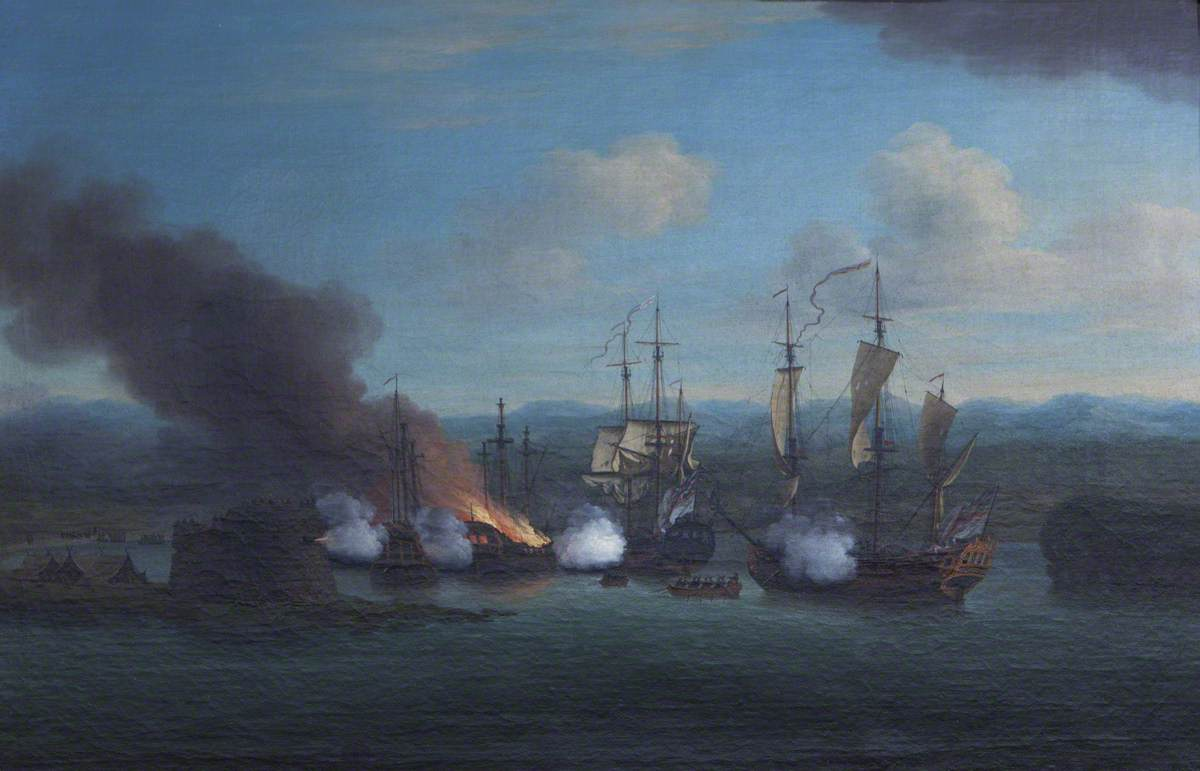
HMS Rose and HMS Shoreham engaging two Salé Rovers off Mogador Island in 1734

The Salé Rovers, also known as the Sallee Rovers, were a group of Barbary pirates active during the 17th and 18th centuries in the Mediterranean Sea and Atlantic Ocean. Like other Barbary pirates, they attacked Christian merchant shipping and ransomed or enslaved any crew members and passengers they captured. Numerous Salé Rovers operated out of the Republic of Salé, which was established on the mouth of the Bou Regreg river and existed from 1627 to 1668.

Salli was nominally under the control of the Emperor of Morocco but in 1627 it broke away and established a self-governing Moorish republic in what is now the cities of Rabat and Salé in Morocco. Most of the Sallee pirates were Muslims expelled from Spain, but also European renegades. A large number of the European renegades were former English and Dutch Protestants, but every Christian ethnicity from Europe, Asia, Africa and the New World was represented among them. One such corsair was the Dutchman Jan Janszoon, who underwent conversion to Islam after being captured by Barbary pirates in 1618 and was renamed Murat Reis.

The activities of the Sallee pirates extended into the English Channel and the Atlantic, and even as far as Newfoundland. By the 18th century, anti-piracy operations by European navies such as the British Royal Navy led to the eventual decline and disappearance of the Salé Rovers.

== See also ==
- Ahmed el Inglizi
