= Action of 31 January 1748 =

1748 naval battle

- Part of the War of the Austrian Succession
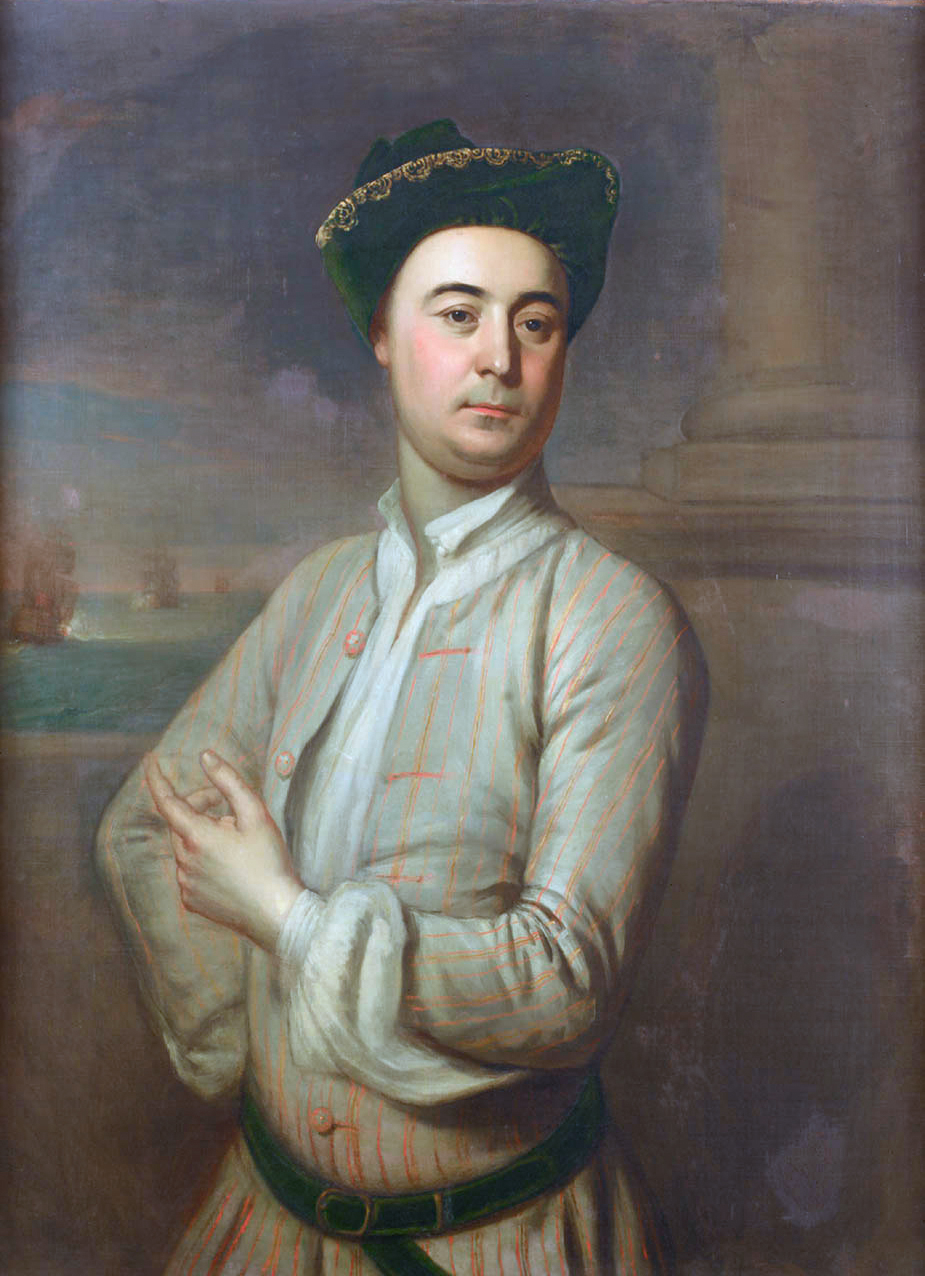
- A portrait of British commander Robert Harland
Date	31 January 1748
Location	Off Ushant, Atlantic Ocean
Result	British victory

Belligerents
Great Britain	France

Commanders and leaders
Robert Harland	Charles d'Albert du Chesne

Strength
2 ships of the line	1 ship of the line

Casualties and losses
16 killed 22 wounded	45 killed 105 wounded 530 captured 1 ship of the line captured

The action of 31 January 1748 was a minor naval battle of the War of Austrian Succession between two British Royal naval ships and a French naval ship of the line. The battle ended with the capture of the French ship of the line Le Magnanime.

In January 1748, Le Magnanime left Brest for the East Indies. She was partially dismasted in a storm off the coast of Ushant and while limping back to Brest, she was spotted by a British fleet under Edward Hawke.

All sail was immediately made; HMS Nottingham under Captain Robert Harland having at 1 am closed with the chase commenced the action and a running fight of six hours duration ensued. The rear admiral having observed the size of the ship sent the sixty gun ship HMS Portland under Captain Stevens to proceed to the Nottingham's assistance. By the time the Portland had arrived up the French ship which proved to be the Magnanime a large class 74 gun ship commanded by the Marquis d'Albert after receiving a few shot from the Portland was forced to strike

The Magnanime out of a crew of 686 men had 45 killed and 105 wounded; Nottingham had 16 killed and 18 wounded while Portland, catching up and joining the fight an hour later, had only 4 wounded.

Magnanime being a new ship of less than four years old was added to the British navy under the same name.
