= Sproughton =

Village in Suffolk, England

Coordinates: 52.062411°N 1.095272°E

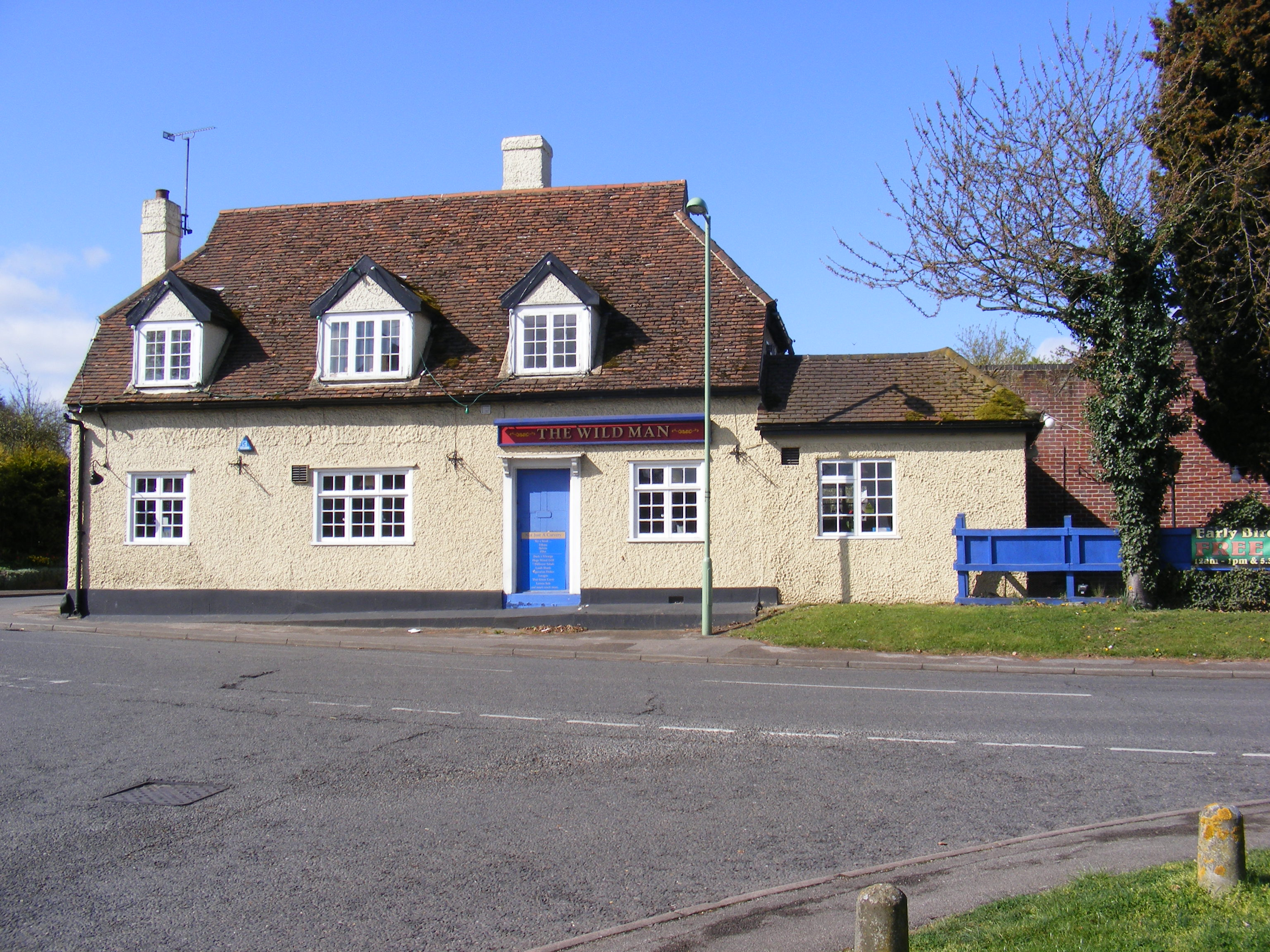
- The Wildman public house, Sproughton

- Location within Suffolk
- Area: 7.77 km^{2} (3.00 sq mi)
- Population: 1,376 (2011)
  - Density: 177/km^{2} (460/sq mi)
- District: Babergh
- Shire county: Suffolk
- Region: East
- Country: England
- Sovereign state: United Kingdom
- Post town: Ipswich
- Postcode district: IP2, IP8
- UK Parliament: South Suffolk

Sproughton (/ˈsprɔːtən/ SPRAW-tən) is a village in Suffolk, England, just to the west of Ipswich and is in the Babergh administrative district. It has a church, a primary school, a pub (the Wild Man, which has been closed since 2020), a community shop and various groups. It is in the Belstead Brook electoral division of Suffolk County Council.

The River Gipping runs through the village. Nearby villages include Bramford and Burstall.

== All Saints Church, Sproughton ==
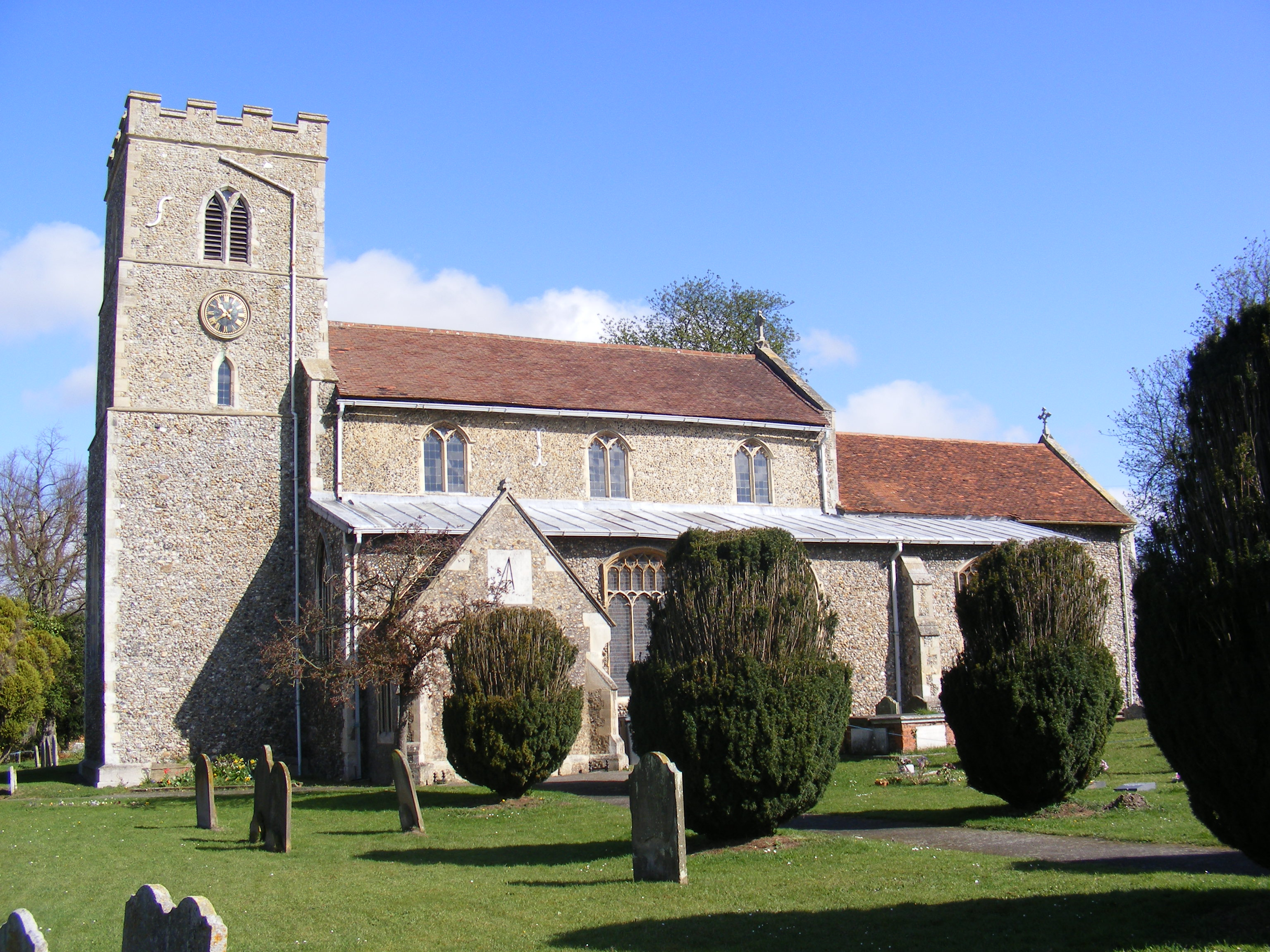
All Saints Church, Sproughton

The Anglican parish church dates from the 14th century. It was restored in the second half of the 19th century, by Frederick Barnes of Ipswich.

== Chantry estate and Sproughton Hall ==
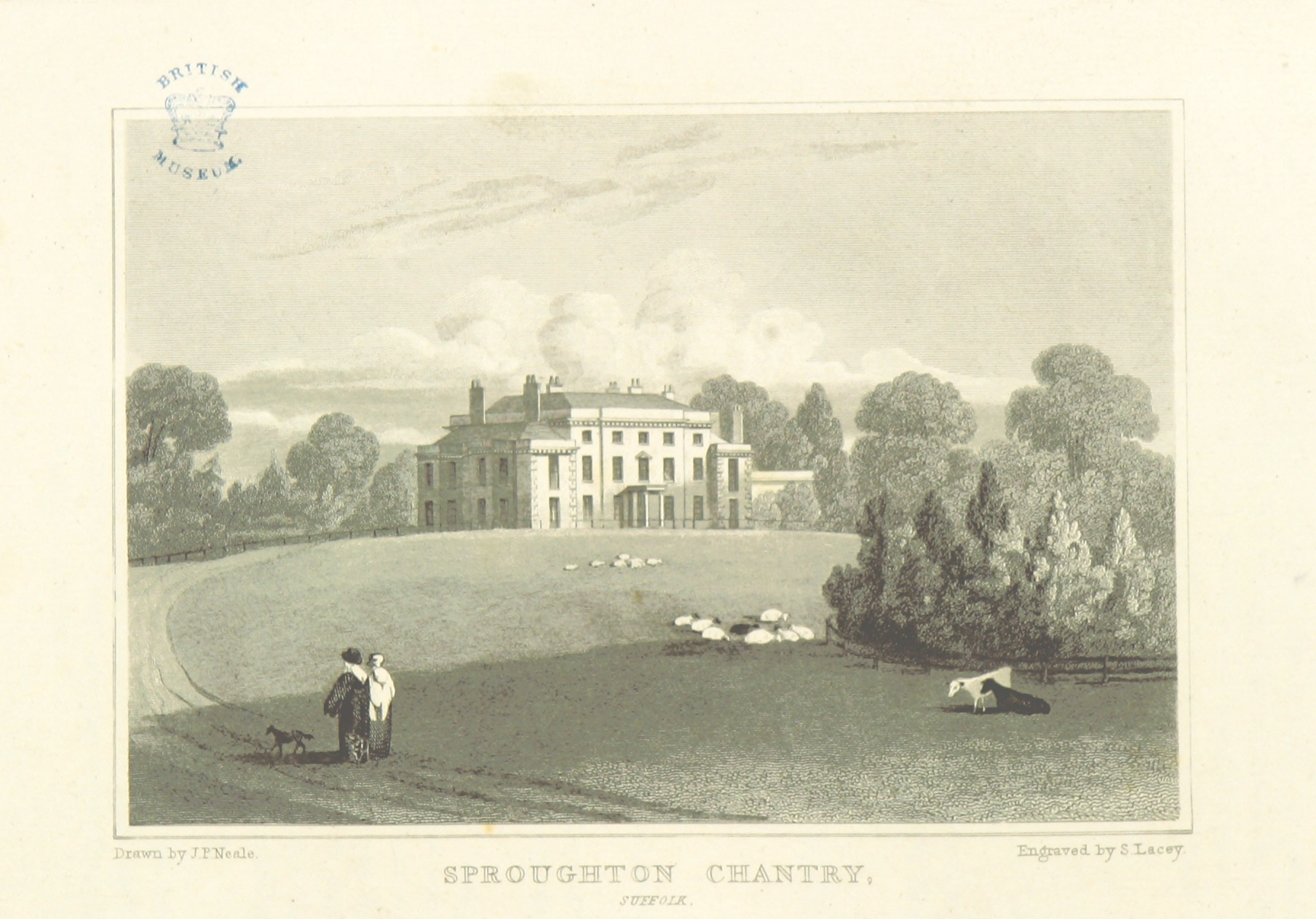
Sproughton Chantry, 1818 engraving

The historical house Sproughton Chantry, and its estate, was the origin of Chantry Park, now on the western outskirts of Ipswich.

The poet Ann Candler arrived in Sproughton on her marriage in 1762. She encountered difficulties with her absentee militiaman husband and a growing family. From the Tattingstone workhouse, she wrote verse in 1785 commemorating the death of Metcalfe Russell, a benefactor. He was a barrister of Gray's Inn, called to the bar in 1762, and had bought the Chantry in 1772. By his will it passed to Michael Collinson, a relation.

Sproughton Hall, not far from the Chantry, was built by Sir Robert Harland, 1st Baronet.
