= Iles Purpuraires =

Group of small islands off the western coast of Morocco off Essaouira

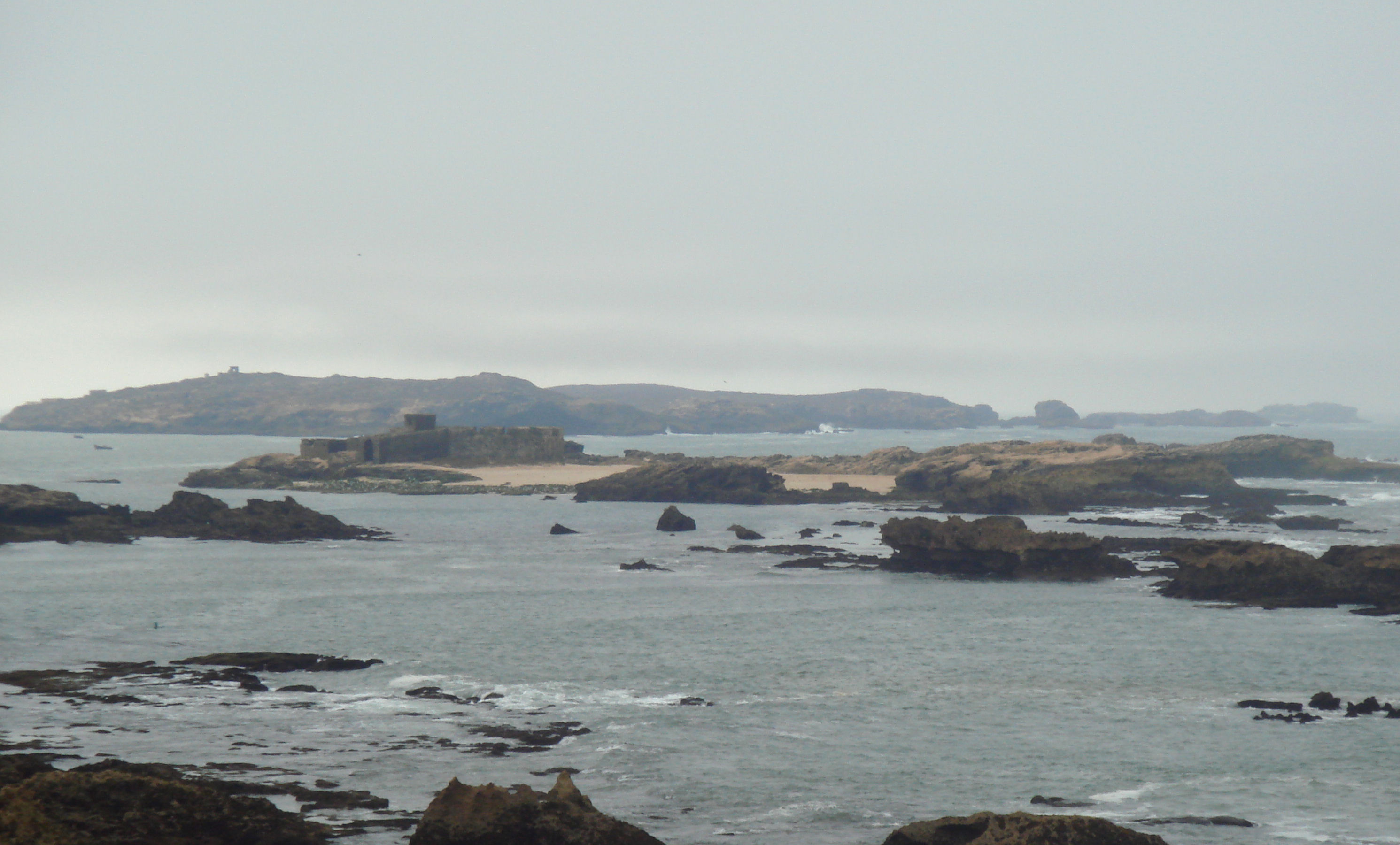
- Iles Purpuraires, including Mogador island, seen from the Essaouira citadel
- Interactive map of Iles Purpuraires

Geography
- Location: North Atlantic Ocean
- Coordinates: 31°29′50″N 9°47′12″W
- Major islands: Mogador Island

Administration
- Morocco
- Region: Marrakesh-Safi
- Province: Essaouira Province

Ramsar Wetland
- Official name: Archipel et dunes d'Essawira
- Designated: 15 January 2005
- Reference no.: 1469

Iles Purpuraires are a set of small islands off the western coast of Morocco at the bay located at Essaouira, the largest of which is Mogador Island. These islands were settled in antiquity by the Phoenicians, chiefly to exploit certain marine resources and as a promontory fort. (Hogan, 2007) Roman occupation of western Morocco beginning in the 1st century AD continued the use of the islets, principally for the manufacture of a royal blue dye from the marine organisms Murex. Ile Purpuraires is associated with the color purple, and Hanno the Navigator may have visited these islands. Neolithic archaeological studies in this area indicate indigenous peoples of western Morocco fished in this locale circa 3000 to 2000 BC. (Trakadas, 2002) The islands have been designated as a protected Ramsar site since 2005.
