= HMS Nottingham (1703) =

Ship of the line of the Royal Navy

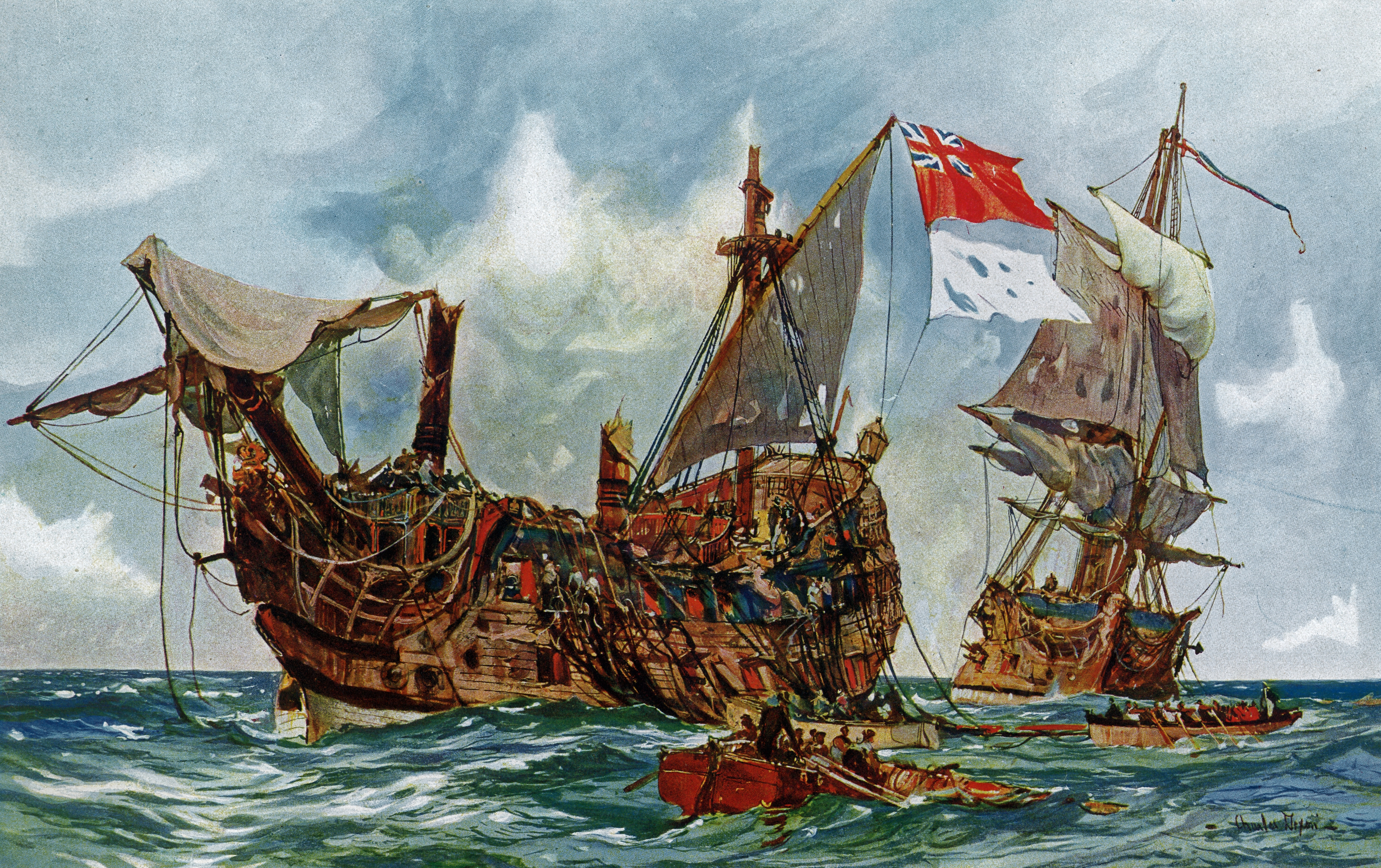
- Painting of Nottingham (right) capturing Mars on 11 October 1746 by Charles Dixon. Mars was returning to France after the failed Duc d'Anville expedition.

History

Great Britain
- Name: HMS Nottingham
- Builder: Harding, Deptford Dockyard
- Launched: 10 June 1703
- Honours and awards: Second Battle of Cape Finisterre, 1747; Battle of Cabrita Point
- Fate: Sunk as a breakwater, 1773

General characteristics as built
- Class & type: 60-gun fourth-rate ship of the line
- Tons burthen: 924 bm
- Length: 145 ft 9.5 in (44.4 m) (gundeck)
- Beam: 38 ft (11.6 m)
- Depth of hold: 15 ft 11 in (4.9 m)
- Propulsion: Sails
- Sail plan: Full-rigged ship
- Complement: 365 officers and men
- Armament: 60 guns of various weights of shot

General characteristics after 1719 rebuild
- Class & type: 1706 Establishment 60-gun fourth-rate ship of the line
- Tons burthen: 928 bm
- Length: 144 ft (43.9 m) (gundeck)
- Beam: 38 ft (11.6 m)
- Depth of hold: 15 ft 8 in (4.8 m)
- Propulsion: Sails
- Sail plan: Full-rigged ship
- Armament: 60 guns: Gundeck: 24 × 24-pdrs; Upper gundeck: 26 × 9-pdrs; Quarterdeck: 8 × 6-pdrs; Forecastle: 2 × 6-pdrs

General characteristics after 1745 rebuild
- Class & type: 1733 proposals 60-gun fourth-rate ship of the line
- Tons burthen: 1,077 bm
- Length: 144 ft (43.9 m) (gundeck)
- Beam: 41 ft 5 in (12.6 m)
- Depth of hold: 16 ft 11 in (5.2 m)
- Propulsion: Sails
- Sail plan: Full-rigged ship
- Armament: 60 guns: Gundeck: 24 × 24-pdrs; Upper gundeck: 26 × 9-pdrs; Quarterdeck: 8 × 6-pdrs; Forecastle: 2 × 6-pdrs

HMS Nottingham was a 60-gun fourth-rate ship of the line of the Royal Navy, built at Deptford Dockyard and launched on 10 June 1703. She was the first ship to bear the name.

Commissioned under Captain Samuel Whitaker, she formed part of Admiral Cloudesley Shovell's fleet that sailed with Admiral Rooke to attack and take the formidable Rock of Gibraltar in 1704. The ship also saw action in the Battle of Cabrita point in March 1705 and in the Mediterranean in 1711.

Nottingham was rebuilt according to the 1706 Establishment at Deptford, from where she was relaunched on 5 October 1719. On 18 May 1739, orders were issued directing that Nottingham be taken to pieces and rebuilt according to the 1733 proposals of the 1719 Establishment at Sheerness, from where she was relaunched on 17 August 1745.

The ship, when captained by Philip Saumarez, also attacked and captured the French ship Mars, which was returning to France after the failed Duc d'Anville Expedition, 11 October 1746. Nottingham took Augustin de Boschenry de Drucour captive.

Nottingham gained more success with the capture of the French 74-gun Magnanime on 31 January 1748 under Captain Robert Harland.

Nottingham continued in service until 1773, when she was sunk to form part of a breakwater.

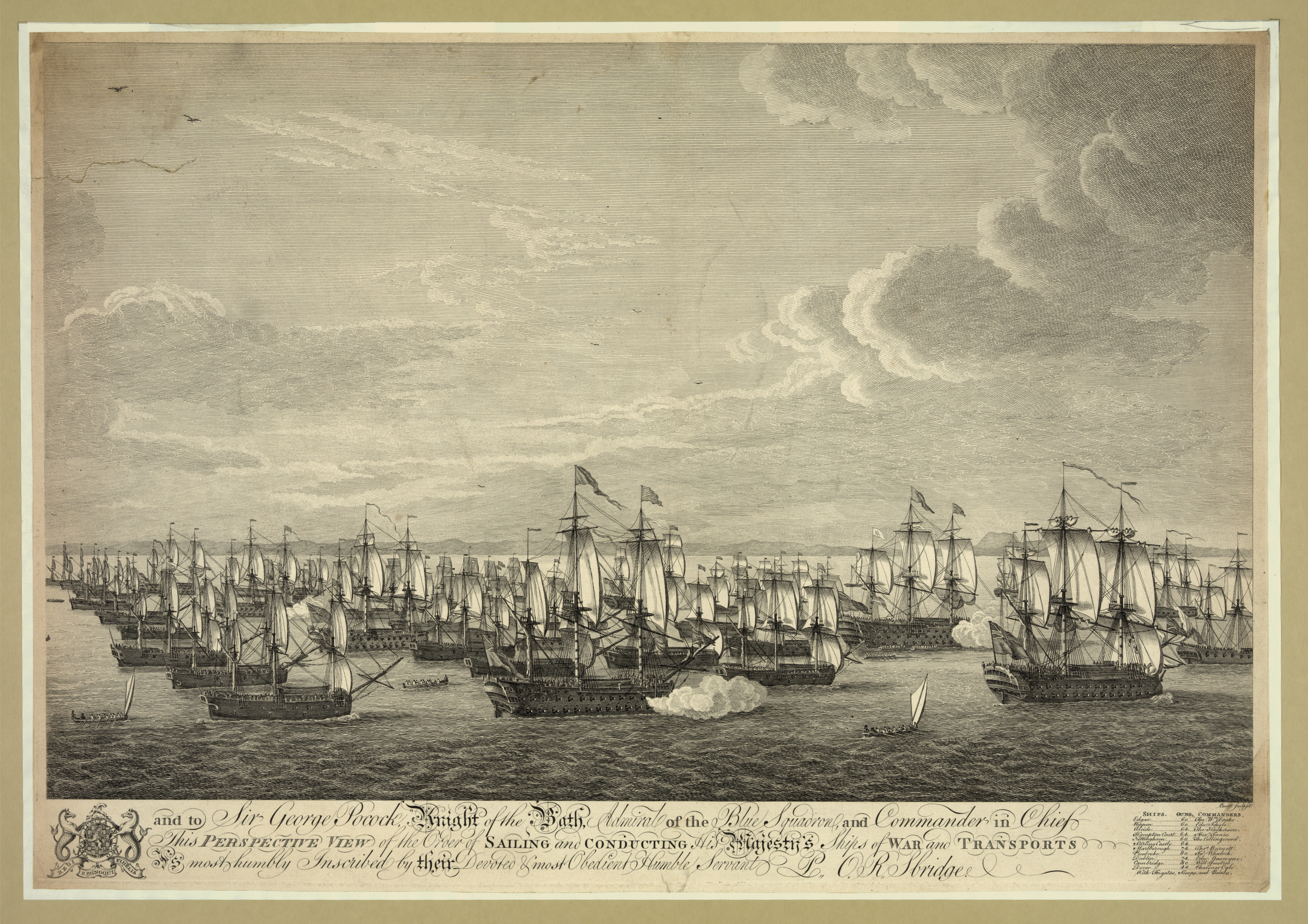
Shown here as a member Sir George Pocock's Blue Squadron, circa 1762
