= English ship Rosebush =

Rosebush was a vessel of the English Navy, originally in the Commonwealth of England, but in 1660 transferred to the English Royal Navy at the Stuart Restoration. She is named as one of his Majesty's ships in 1660, commissioned by James, Duke of York who at that time was commander (Lord High Admiral of England) of the Royal Navy.

== Origin ==
Rosebush was originally a Dutch armed merchant ship (Dutch Rozenboom or Rooseboom of the Amsterdam Directors) captured during the 1st Anglo Dutch war. Built in Amsterdam in March 1651/52, it was present at the Battle of Dover on 19 May 1652 (commanded by Kapitein Gerrit Schuyt). It was among five ships that were taken by the English on 4 June 1653 during the Battle of the Gabbard (commanded by Kapitein Bartolomeus Riesbeeck).

== Ships particulars ==
Detail	Description	Type	Metric equivalent
Dimension	84 ft 0 in keel x 24ft 6in x 11 ft 6 in	Imperial feet	25.60 x 7.42 x 3.44
Tonnage	268 ^{18}/_{94} bm	tons burthen	
Draft	14 ft 0in	Imperial feet	4.27
Armament	32 guns later reduced to 24		
Crew complement	130 Later 100 / 85 / 70		

== Commonwealth period ==
Rosebush was commissioned as a fourth rate being fitted out in June of 1653 under command of Captain Valentine Tatnell (1653 - 1654), and was stationed at St Helen's in the winter of 1653-54. Later in 1654 she was under command of Captain Richard Hodges who held her until 1656, stationed with Sir William Penn's fleet in the West Indies (1655-56).

== Restoration period ==
On 1 January 1660, by order of James, the vessel was to be fitted out "for a voyage to Jamaica" and to be "delivered into possession of Colonel Thomas Middleton". Around this time Rosebush was one of 37 vessels designated as a fifth rate. Captain Seth Hawley commanded the vessel until June 1660, the vessel being for Iceland Fishery protection.

The ship is mentioned in the diary of Samuel Pepys, as being captained by John Browne of Walthamstow, Essex. Browne's wife Elizabeth was sister of Sir William Batten.

Pepys mentions the vessel as Rose-bush being at Woolwich on 14 February 1661, as being dinner guests of Captain Browne. Elsewhere the vessel has been erroneously named Rosebud.

The ship again comes into the fore when on 31 July 1662, Pepys in the company of William Coventry, witnesses Captain Browne being chastised by Coventry in the streets of London for not having sailed. Later in the same day at Woolwich visiting Rosebush which was in a state of disarray, not being ready for dispatch on account of officer delinquency.

A later entry in Pepys diary on 16 December 1662 makes note of an official complaint made by the purser Thomas Strutt against Browne causing Pepys to have a headache on account of Strutt. William G. Matthews notes that Strutt was discharged from Rosebush in July 1662 at his own request, while his successor resigned in March 1663.

The last entry Pepys makes is on hearing of Captain Browne's death on 25 April 1663 caused by a blow to the forehead by a stone in some altercation with one of his seaman, his servant.

Rosebush remained in service to the Royal Navy until 1664 in close relationship to Sir William Batten. It is mentioned in several letters pertaining to Harwich. On 19 October the vessel was at Deptford being made ready for a voyage to Harwich. The Master-Attendant at Deptford Capt. William Badiley however on 1 November objected of fitting the main mast of the Dunkirk to Rosebush and suggests she be towed by the Harwich hoy instead. By 16 December Rosebush had arrived at Harwich as noted by Anthony Deane who in October 1664 was appointed as the Navy Board's master shipwright on Pepys' recommendation of reopening the derelict Harwich Dockyard. Batten's boatswain William Baker sends word to Sir William noting of the ship's arrival at Harwich and his need for a house for lodging and provisions for fitting Rosebush for a hulk. She was finally sold in November 1668.
