= Mogador Island =

Island in Morocco

Native name: جزيرة موغادور (Arabic) ⴰⵎⴳⴷⵓⵍ (Berber)
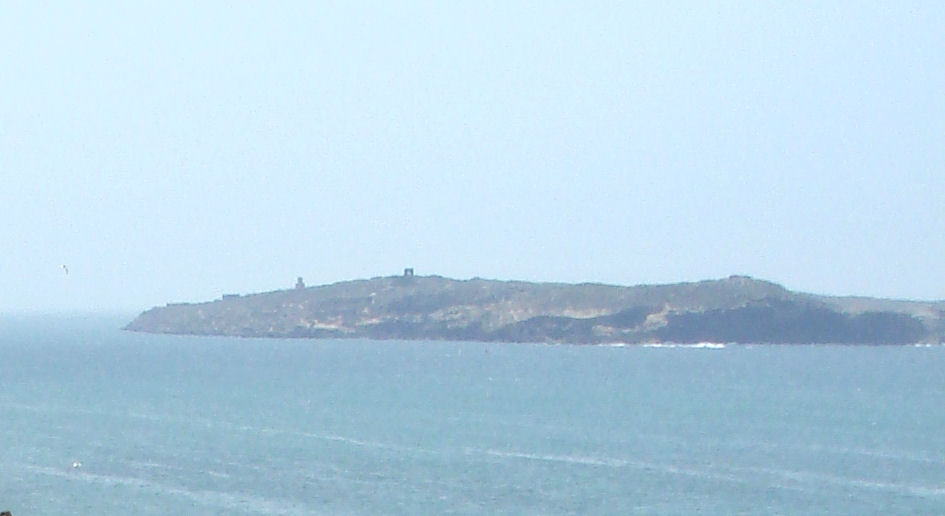
- The island as viewed from the mainland
- Interactive map of Mogador Island

Geography
- Location: North Atlantic Ocean
- Coordinates: 31°29′44″N 9°47′11″W
- Archipelago: Iles Purpuraires

Administration
- Morocco
- Region: Marrakesh-Safi
- Province: Essaouira Province

Ramsar Wetland
- Official name: Archipel et dunes d'Essawira
- Designated: 15 January 2005
- Reference no.: 1469

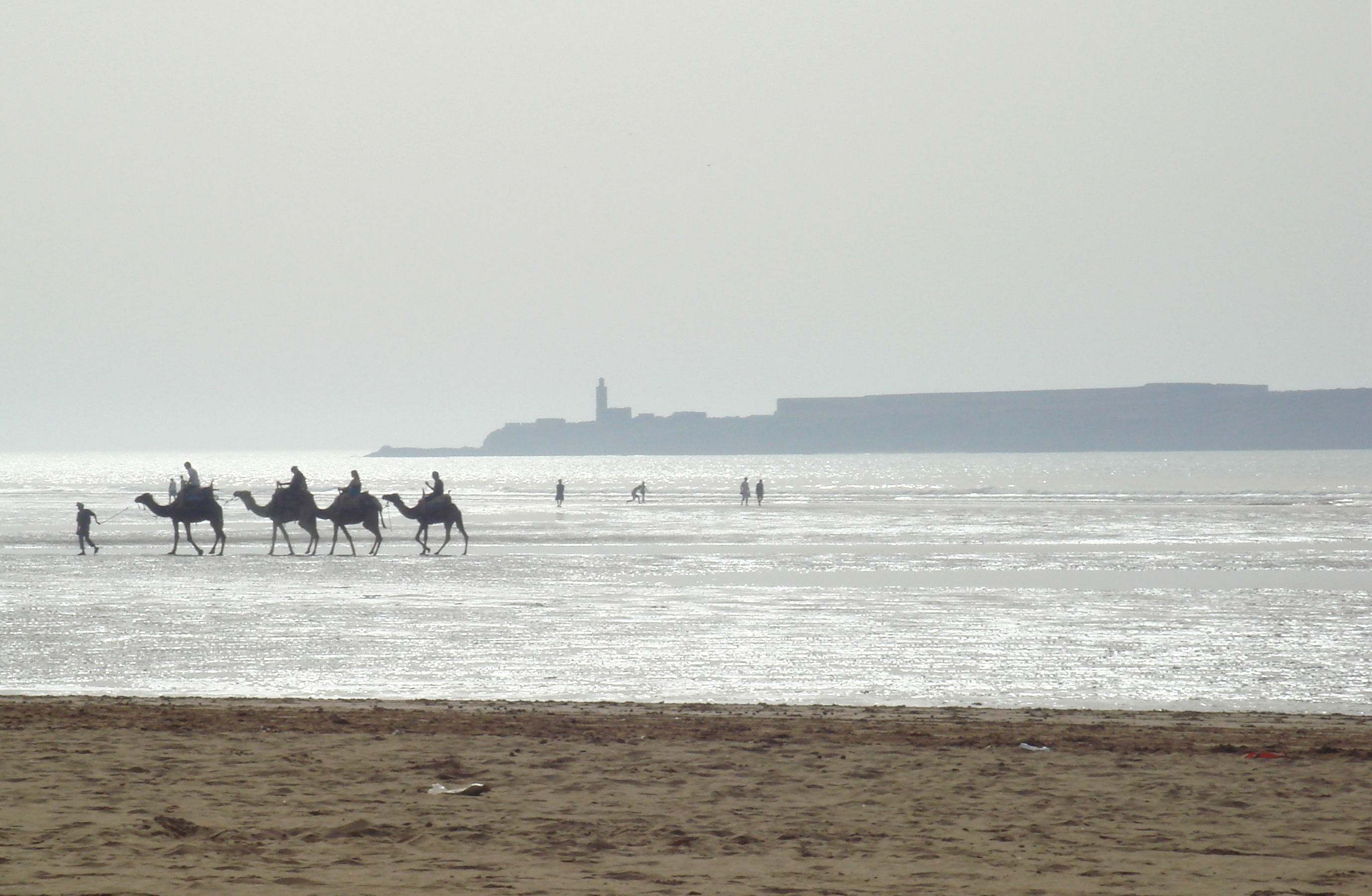
Mogador Island, seen from Essaouira beach.

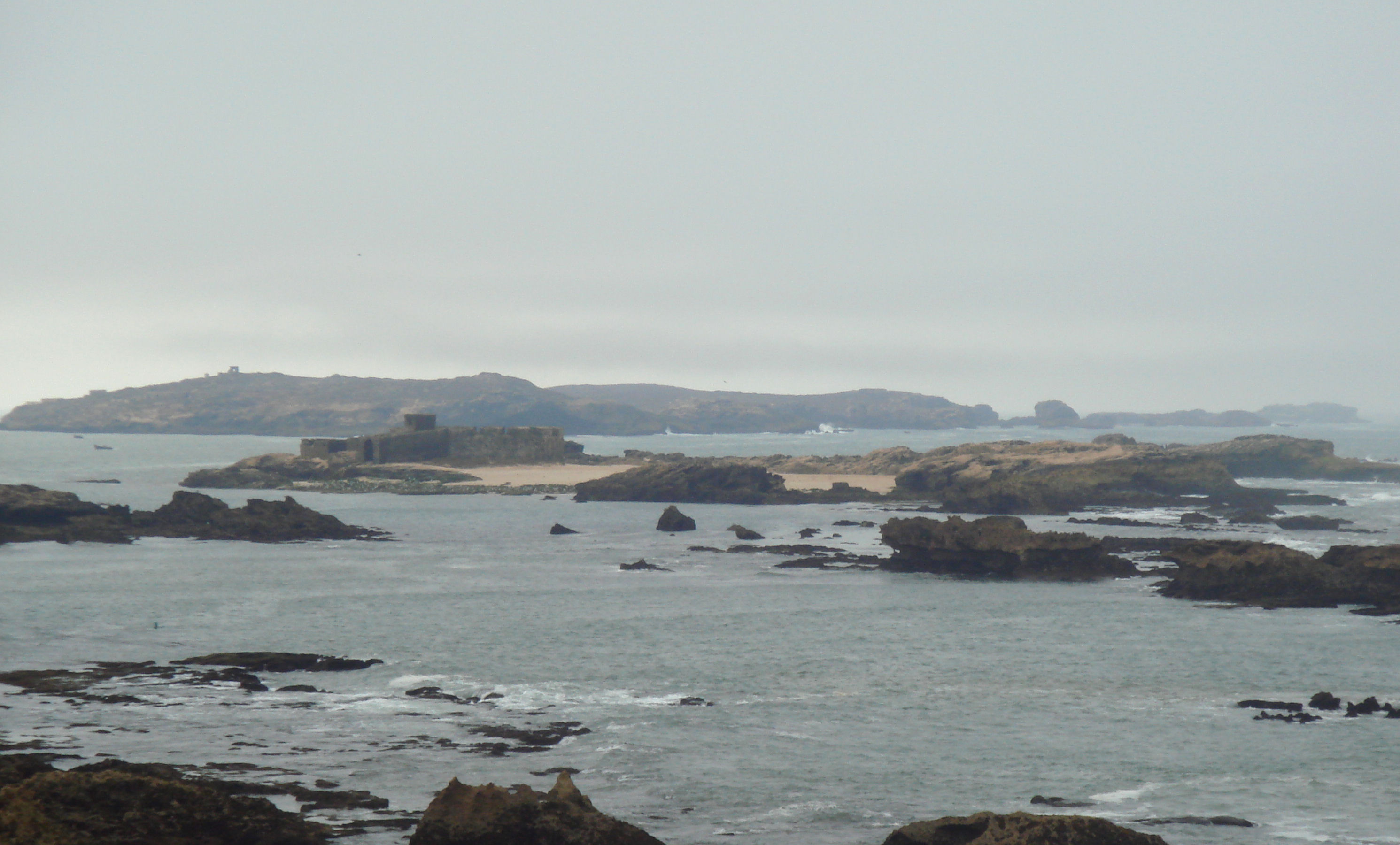
Iles Purpuraires, with Mogador Island in the background seen from the Essaouira citadel.

Mogador Island (Arabic: جزيرة موݣادور, romanized: Jazīrat Mūgādūr; Standard Moroccan Tamazight: ⴰⵎⴳⴷⵓⵍ, romanized: Amegdul) is the main island of the Iles Purpuraires near Essaouira in Morocco. It is about 3 kilometres (2 miles) long and 1.5 kilometres (1 mile) wide, and lies about 1.5 kilometres (1 mile) from Essaouira.

== History ==
The Carthaginian navigator Hanno visited and established a trading post in the area in the 5th century BC, and Phoenician artifacts have been found on the island.

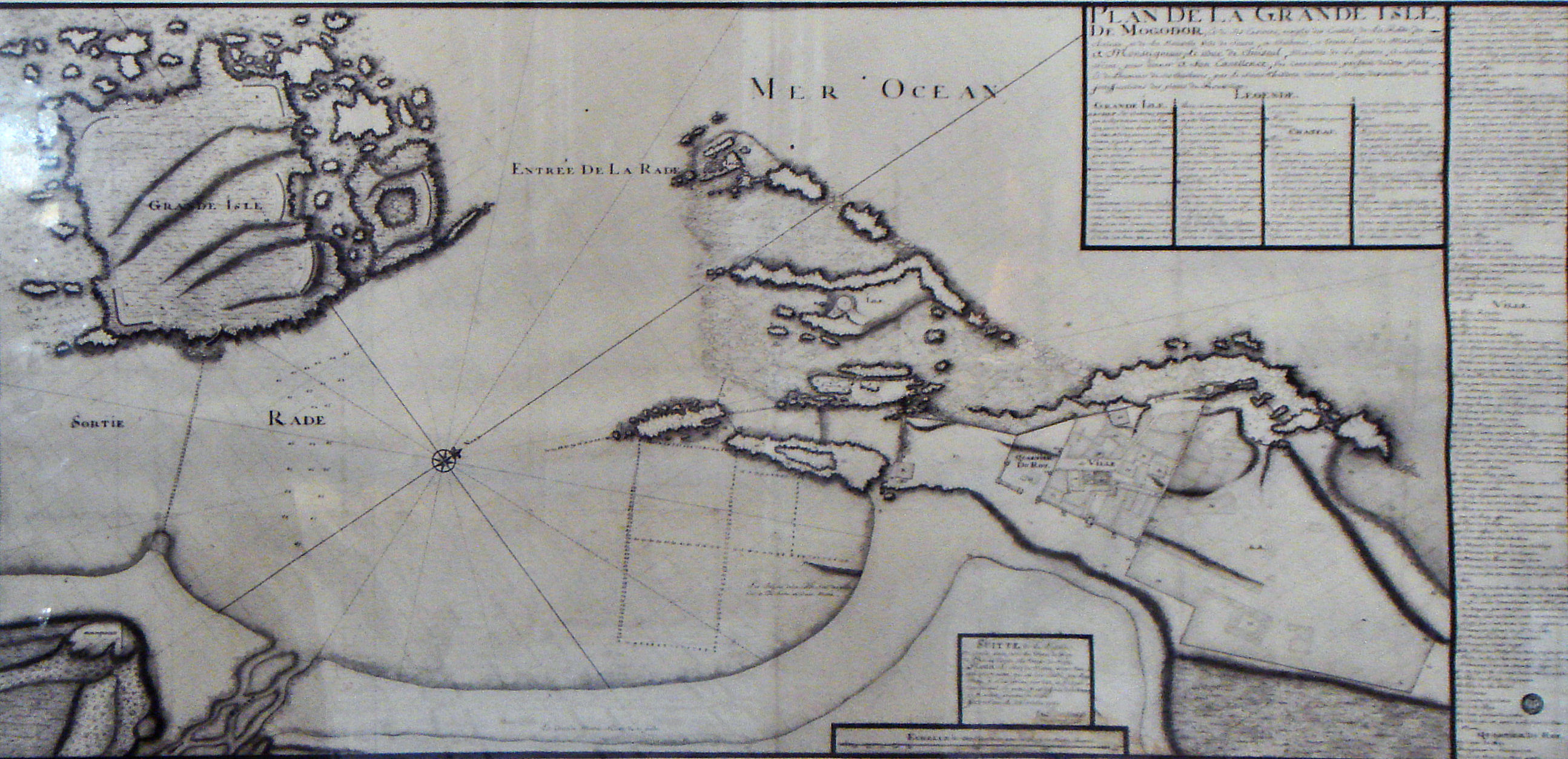
Map of Mogador Island (upper left) in Essaouira bay, by Théodore Cornut, 1767.

Around the end of the 1st century BC or early 1st century AD, Juba II established a Tyrian purple factory, processing the murex and purpura shells found in the intertidal rocks at Essaouira and the Iles Purpuraires. This dye colored the purple stripe in Imperial Roman Senatorial togas.

Roman merchants settled in the island under Augustus creating a small village: a Roman house with foundations, and also artifacts and coins, were also found on the island. Mogador and the nearby Iles Purpuraires were tied to Mauretania Tingitana by merchant ships in the first and second centuries of the Roman Empire.

Some historians think that from Mogador Island the Roman merchants reached the Cape Verde islands and possibly went south until the Gulf of Guinea. Indeed, according to Roman Pliny the Elder, an expedition of Mauretanians sent by Juba II to the Canary archipelago visited the Cape Verde islands: when King Juba II dispatched a contingent to re-open the dye production facility at Mogador (historical name of Essaouira, Morocco) in the early 1st century AD, Juba's naval force was subsequently sent on an exploration of the Canary Islands, Madeira and probably the Cape Verde islands, using Mogador as their mission base.

After the fall of the Roman empire the commerce from Mogador Island practically disappeared and the island lost most of its importance during the Middle Ages.

In 1844, the French Navy besieged the island, and it fell to the French in France's brutal Bombardment of Mogador.

In 1866, the Moroccan Sultan Mohammed IV agreed, and issued a Dahir on 18 November, to use the island as a Lazaretto, for pilgrims who were returning from the Hajj and might be carrying any number of diseases prevalent in the world at that time.

It has now been designated as a nature reserve, and it cannot be visited without an official authorization. The island has been designated as a protected Ramsar site since 2005.

== Flora and fauna ==
A survey of falcons on the island in 2014 found evidence of Eleonora's falcon (Falco eleonorae) crippling and imprisoning live prey for later use. Abdeljebbar Qninba of Mohammed V University, Rabat, and colleagues, found small birds with missing flight and tail feathers trapped, or hiding in small holes or cavities. It is thought either the falcons plucked feathers to keep the birds as a food source for later, or alternatively, the prey are escaping from the falcons by finding refuge in nearby holes.

== See also ==
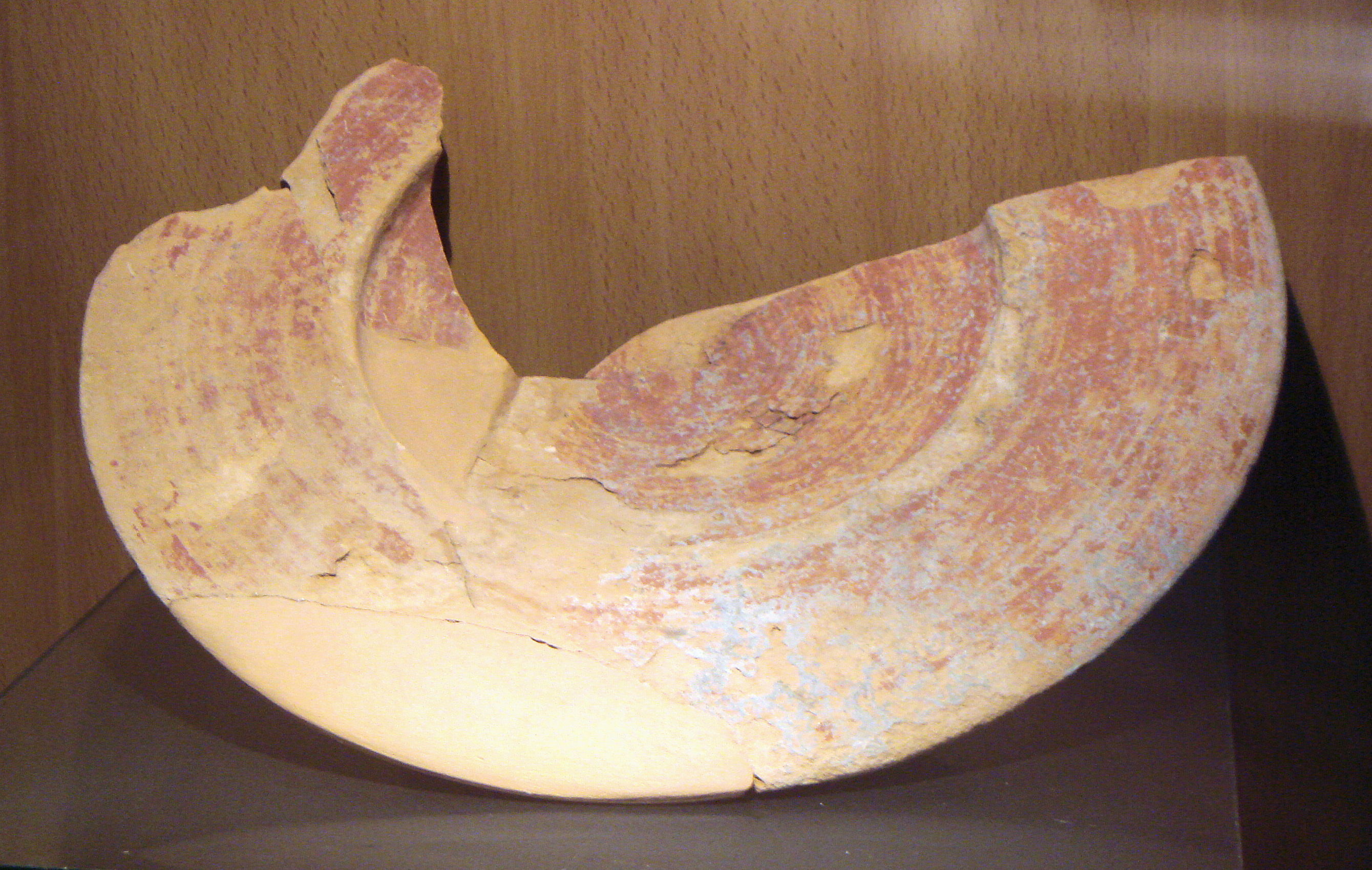
Phoenician plate with red slip, 7th century BCE, excavated in Mogador Island, Essaouira. Sidi Mohammed ben Abdallah Museum

- Mauretania Tingitana

== Bibliography ==
- Lipiński, Edward. Itineraria Phoenicia Peeters Publishers. Paris, 2004. ISBN 9042913444. ()
