= Temple Beth-El (Casablanca) =

Orthodox synagogue in Casablanca, Morocco

Beth-El Synagogue
- Hebrew: בית הכנסת בית־אל; Arabic: معبد بيت إيل
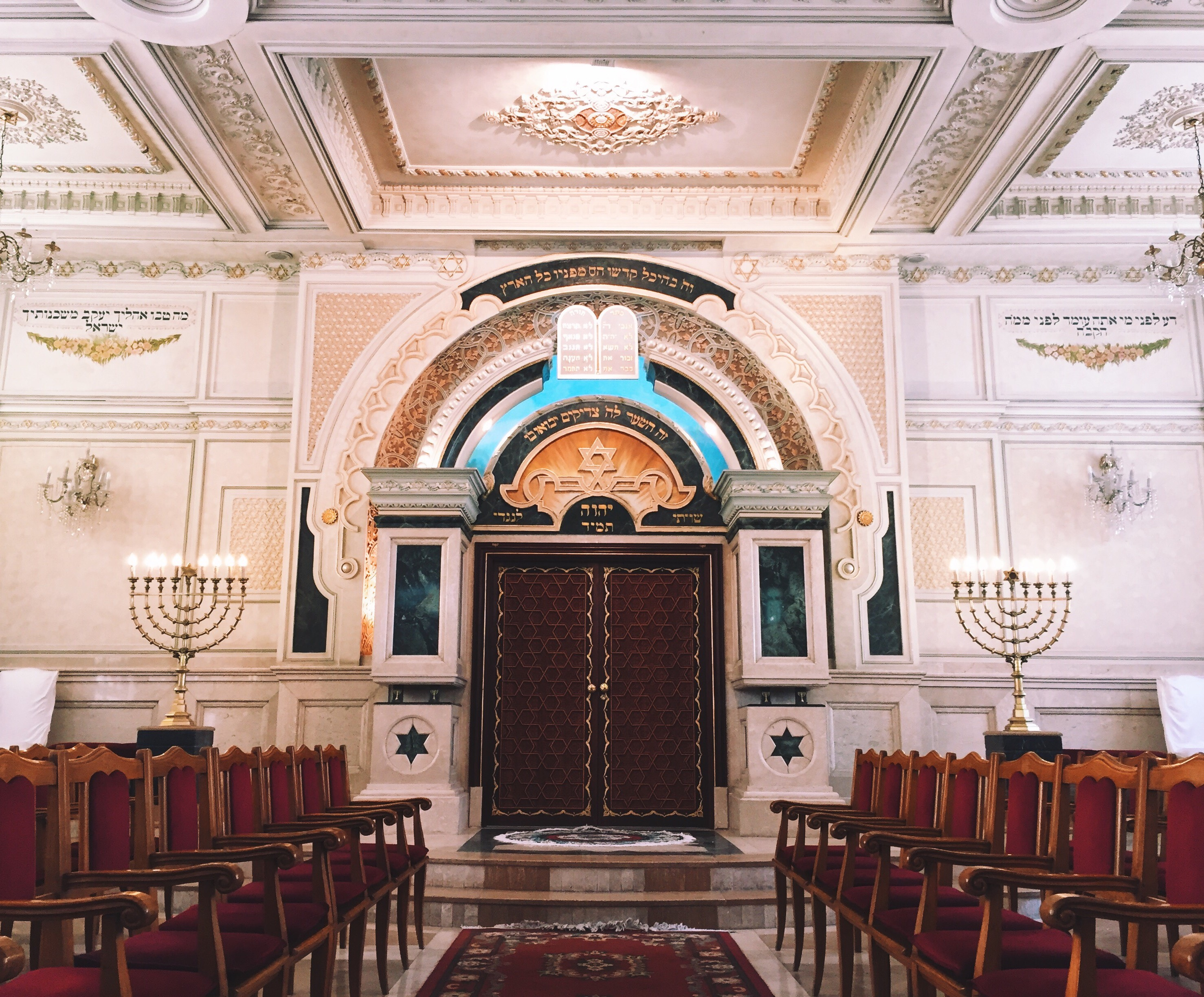
- The synagogue interior, in 2017

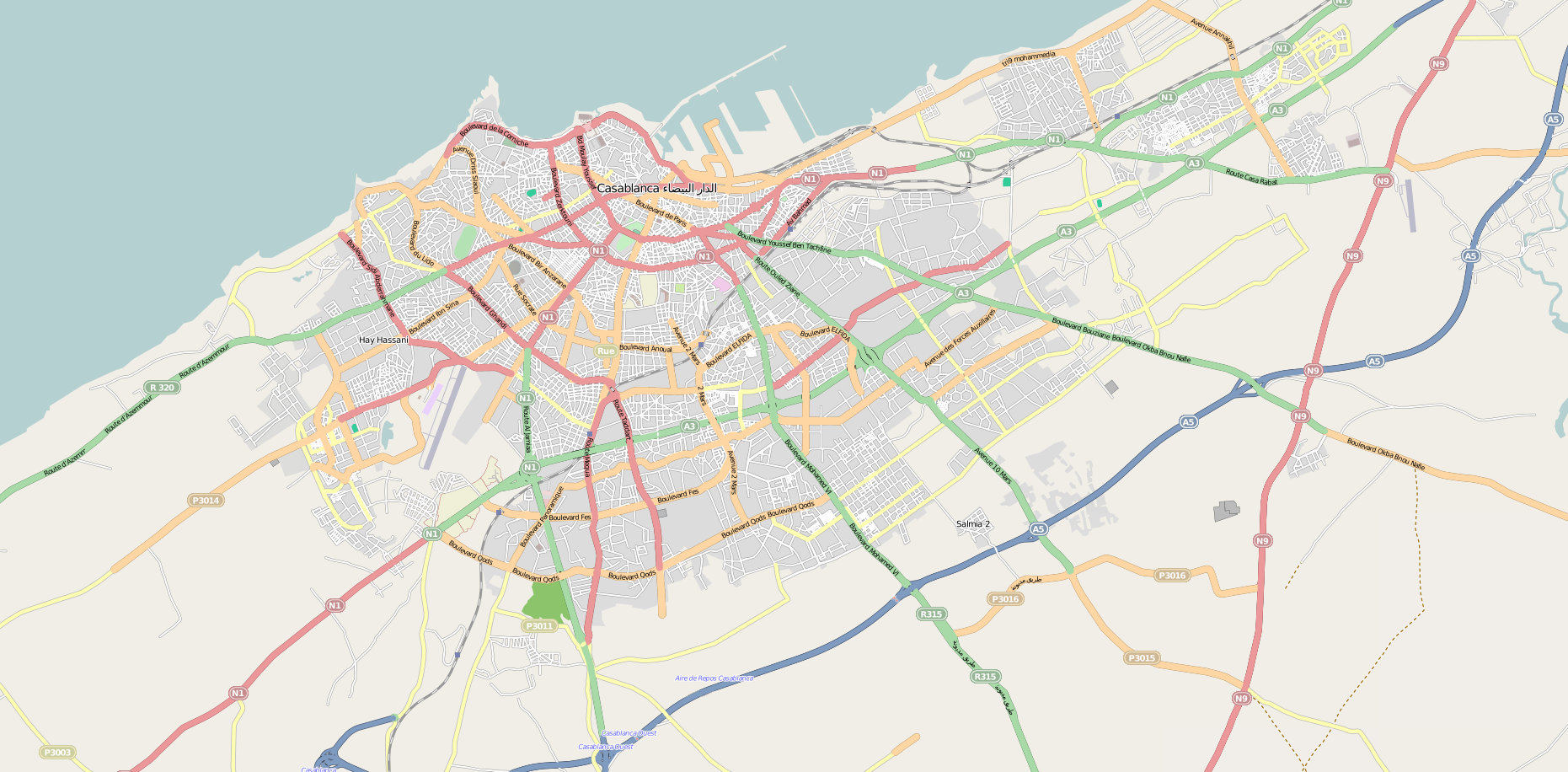
- Location of the synagogue in Greater Casablanca

Religion
- Affiliation: Orthodox Judaism
- Rite: Nusach Sefard
- Ecclesiastical or organisational status: Synagogue
- Leadership: Rabbi J. Azuelos
- Status: Active
- Notable artworks: Marc Chagall-inspired stained glass windows

Location
- Location: 67, Rue Jaber ben Hayane (ex. Verlet Hanus), Sidi Belyout, Casablanca
- Country: Morocco
- Coordinates: 33°35′48.54″N 7°37′46.74″W

Architecture
- Completed: 1949
- Capacity: 500 worshippers

The Temple Beth-El (Hebrew: בית הכנסת בית־אל, romanized: Béit hak'néset Bēṯ-ʾEl, lit. 'Synagogue of the House of God'; Arabic: معبد بيت إيل, romanized: Maʿbad bayt ʾĪl, lit. 'Temple of the House of El') also called Beit-El or the Algerian Temple, (Note: Le Temple Algérien) is an Orthodox Jewish congregation and synagogue in the Sidi Belyout district of Casablanca, Morocco.

== Overview ==
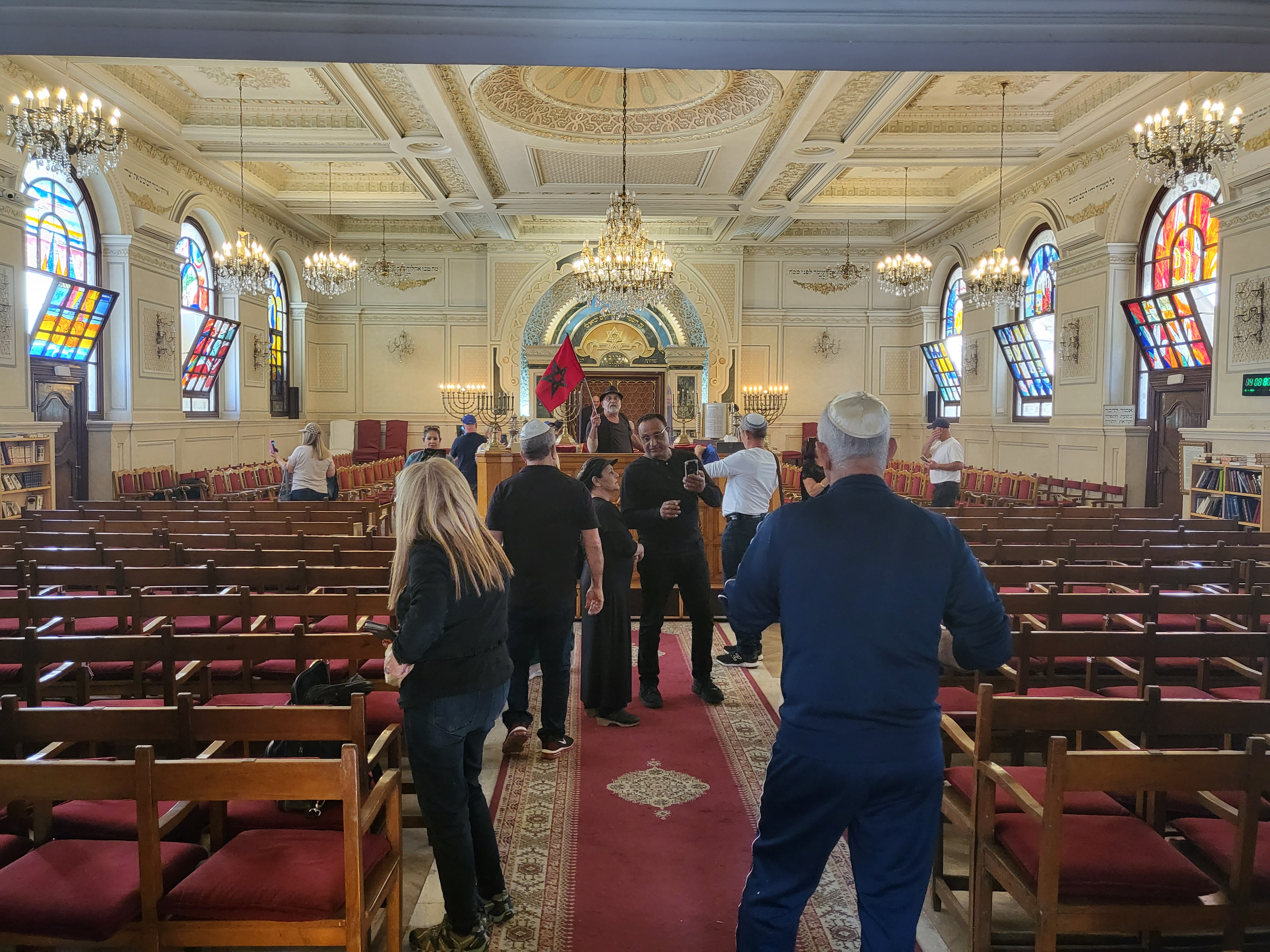
Tourists visiting Beth-El in 2022.

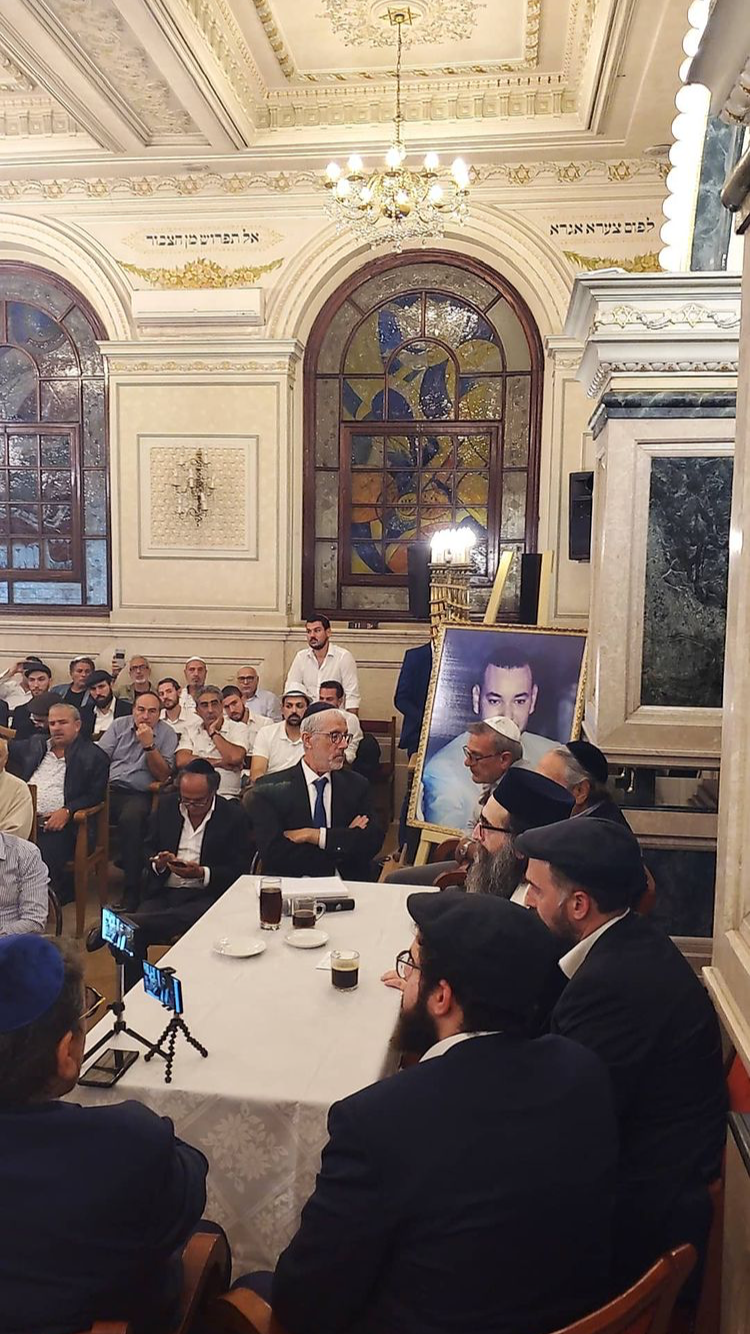
Services at Beth El in 2022. A portrait of Mohammed VI is visible.

While Casablanca has more than 30 synagogues, (Note: However, by 2020, it was claimed that only 16 synagogues were in operation.) Beth-El is often considered the center piece of a once vibrant Jewish community. Its Marc Chagall-inspired stained glass windows and other artistic elements, attract tourists to the synagogue.

== History ==
It was established in 1949 by Algerian Jewish immigrants. Maurice Bengio led a mixed-gender choir that sang during weddings and certain holidays in the 1960s and 1970s, but it was cancelled after Eastern European rabbinic emissaries from a Hasidic community in Brooklyn pressured the leadership of the synagogue.

The temple was completely refurbished in 1997.

== See also ==
- History of the Jews in Morocco
- List of synagogues in Morocco
- Yoshiyahu Yosef Pinto, the Chief Rabbi of Morocco
