= List of synagogues in Morocco =

A partial list of synagogues in Morocco:

== Agadir ==
- Beth-El Synagogue

== Amzrou ==
- Synagogue Amezrou Hadioui

== Arazan ==
- Synagogue Arazane

== Asilah ==
- Kahal Synagogue

== Azemmour ==
- Rabbi Abraham Moul Niss Synagogue

== El Jadida ==
- Bensimon Synagogue

== Casablanca ==
- Anfa Synagogue
- Benarrosh Synagogue
- Beth Avraham Synagogue
- Em Habanim Synagogue
- Tehila Le David Synagogue
- Temple Beth-El (Casablanca)
- Ettedgui Synagogue
- Rabbi Amram Ben Diwan Synagogue

== Debdou ==
- Beit Ha-Knesset Selat Cohanim

== Errachidia ==
- Leshem Yikhoud Synagogue

== Essaouira ==
- Chaim Pinto Synagogue
- Rabbi David Bel Hazan Synagogue
- Simon Attias Synagogue, repurposed as a museum
- Slat Lkahal Synagogue

== Fez ==
Upper Mellah:

- Mansano Synagogue
- Ibn Attar Synagogue
- Synagogue of Rabbi Yehuda ben Attar
- Synagogue of Rabbi Haim Cohen
- Synagogue of Haham Abensur
- Synagogue of Saba
- Gozlan Synagogue

Lower Mellah:

- Shlomo Ibn Danan Synagogue (or Ibn Danan Synagogue)
- Slat al-Fassiyin Synagogue (or al-Fassiyin Synagogue)
- Bar Yochai Synagogue
- Obayd Synagogue
- Dbaba Synagogue
- Synagogue of Rabbi Raphael Abensur

En-Nowawel quarter:

- Synagogue of Aharon Cohen
- Synagogue of Saadian Danan
- Synagogue of Hachuel
- Synagogue of Rabbi El Baz
- Reuven Bensadoun Synagogue

== Gourrama ==
- Gourrama Synagogue

== Ifrane ==
- Synagoque Ifrane Anti-Atlas

== Ksar el-Kebir ==
- Rebbi Mose Synagogue, in ruins

== Larache ==
- Berdugo Synagogue, turned into a house
- Pariente Synagogue

== Marrakech ==
- Al Fassayn Synagogue
- Beth-El Synagogue
- Joseph Bitton Synagogue
- Rabbi Pichas HaCohen Azog Synagogue
- Rabbi Ya’akov Attias Synagogue
- Slat al-Azama Synagogue
- Slat Skaya Synagogue

== Meknes ==
- Etz Hayeem Synagogue
- Rabbi Meir Toledano Synagogue

== Ouarzazate ==
- Bet Knesset Synagogue

== Oujda ==
- Grande Synagogue of Oujda
- Spanish Synagogue

== Rabat ==
- Rabbi Shalom Zaoui Synagogue
- Talmud Torah Synagogue

== Salé ==
- Rafael Synagogue

== Sefrou ==
- Em Habanim Synagogue

== Tangier ==
- Avraham Toledano Synagogue, closed in 1981
- Beit Yehuda Synagogue, repurposed as a museum
- Benseloum Synagogue, closed in the 1980s
- Moshe Nahon Synagogue, open to visitors
- Rabbi Akiba Synagogue, also known as Moshe Laredo Synagogue, open to visitors
- Rabbi Mordechai Bengio Synagogue, preserved as Fondation Lorin Museum
- Shaar Rafael Synagogue, still functioning
- Shaarei Yosef Synagogue

== Taroudant ==
- Synagogue of Taroudant, transformed into an antique shop

== Tétouan ==
- Crudo Synagogue, turned into a house
- Isaac Ben Walid Synagogue
- Pintada Synagogue, turned into a house
- Yagdil Torah

== See also ==
- History of the Jews in Morocco
- List of synagogues in Algeria
- List of synagogues in Tunisia
