= List of World Heritage Sites in Morocco =

Location of World Heritage Sites in Morocco

The United Nations Educational, Scientific and Cultural Organization (UNESCO) World Heritage Sites are places of importance to cultural or natural heritage as described in the UNESCO World Heritage Convention, established in 1972. Cultural heritage consists of monuments (such as architectural works, monumental sculptures, or inscriptions), groups of buildings, and sites (including archaeological sites). Natural heritage consists of natural features (physical and biological formations), geological and physiographical formations (including habitats of threatened species of animals and plants), and natural sites which are important from the point of view of science, conservation, or natural beauty. The Kingdom of Morocco accepted the convention on 28 October 1975, making its historical sites eligible for inclusion on the list. There are nine World Heritage Sites in Morocco, all selected for their cultural significance.

Morocco's first site, Medina of Fez, was inscribed on the list at the 5th Session of the World Heritage Committee, held in Paris, France in 1981. The most recent inscription, Rabat, Modern Capital and Historic City: a Shared Heritage, was added to the list in 2012. In addition, Morocco maintains a further 13 properties on the tentative list. Morocco has served on the World Heritage Committee twice.

== World Heritage Sites ==
UNESCO lists sites under ten criteria; each entry must meet at least one of the criteria. Criteria i through vi are cultural, and vii through x are natural.

World Heritage Sites
Site	Image	Location (region)	Year listed	UNESCO data	Description
Medina of Fez	A view of the medina, with several old buildings and two minarets	Fès-Meknès	1981	170; ii, v (cultural)	Fez was founded in the 9th century, reached its apogee as the capital of the Marinid Sultanate in the 13th and 14th centuries, and remained the capital of the country until 1912. The medina is one of the most extensive and best preserved old towns in the Muslim world. The main monuments date to the medieval period and include mosques, madrasas, palaces, and fountains.
Medina of Marrakesh	A minaret in brick with detailed decorations, some palm trees around	Marrakesh–Safi	1985	331; i, ii, iv, v (cultural)	Marrakesh was founded in the 1070s as the capital of the Almoravid dynasty. It later became the capital of the Almohad dynasty, until the 13th century when the capital was moved to Fez. There are numerous monuments in the city including the Koutoubia Mosque (pictured), Jemaa el-Fnaa square, El Badi Palace, Bahia Palace, Saadian Tombs, several mosques, and madrasas. The medina remains a living town, preserving its traditional architecture, crafts, and trades.
Ksar of Ait-Ben-Haddou	A fortified settlement with densely packed buildings and watchtowers in an arid environment	Drâa-Tafilalet	1987	444; iv, v (cultural)	Ait-Ben-Haddou is a ksar, a fortified village, a representative example of a settlement in southern Morocco. It was located on a trans-Saharan trade route. Earthen buildings are packed close together and defensive walls are fortified by towers at the corners. Some of the houses are decorated with motifs in clay brick. The earliest buildings of Ait-Ben-Haddou date from the 17th century although the construction techniques were already present in earlier periods in the region.
Historic City of Meknes	Richly decorated city gates, with tiles and stonework	Fès-Meknès	1996	793; iv (cultural)	Meknes was founded in the 11th century by the Almoravids. In the 17th century, Sultan Moulay Isma'il ibn Sharif of the Alawi dynasty made it his capital and commissioned substantial construction projects, including monumental defensive walls and ramparts and the Kasbah of Moulay Ismail. The city layout incorporates both Islamic and European aspects of architecture and town planning. Bab Mansur al-'Alj is pictured.
Archaeological site of Volubilis	Ruins of a Roman city. A large mosaic in front and columns in the background	Fès-Meknès	1997	836bis; ii, iii, iv, vi (cultural)	Volubilis was founded in the 3rd century BCE as the capital of Mauretania. It was then an important Roman outpost and in the 8th century briefly the capital of the Idrisid dynasty. Afterwards, the site was not occupied for nearly a thousand years. This resulted in remains having been well preserved, making Volubilis one of the richest sites for archeology in North Africa. The remains demonstrate the interactions of different cultures of the Mediterranean through centuries. A mosaic from the Roman period is pictured. A minor boundary modification took place in 2008.
Medina of Tétouan (formerly known as Titawin)	Densely packed buildings of the medina. Houses have white walls and there are walls and some minarets	Tanger-Tetouan-Al Hoceima	1997	837; ii, iv, v (cultural)	Located just south of the Strait of Gibraltar, Tétouan served as the connection point between Morocco and Andalusia from the 8th century onward. Following the Reconquista, it was rebuilt by refugees expelled by the Spanish, and the Andalusian influence is clearly visible in arts and architecture. In the following centuries, it served as the meeting point between the Spanish and Arab civilizations. The medina quarter is among the smallest in Morocco but it is well preserved.
Medina of Essaouira (formerly Mogador)	A view on the city walls and houses from the shore	Marrakesh-Safi	2001	753rev; ii, iv (cultural)	Essaouira was founded by the Alawi Sultan Mohammed ben Abdallah in the second half of the 18th century, with the aim of establishing a major port and trading centre. The city was designed by French architects who followed the principles of French military engineer Marquis of Vauban. In the late 18th and 19th centuries, Essaouira was one of the major Atlantic trading centres between Africa and Europe. Today, the city mainly preserves its European appearance.
Portuguese City of Mazagan (El Jadida)	A view of the city, with houses and minarets	Casablanca-Settat	2004	1058rev; ii, iv (cultural)	In the early 16th century, the Portuguese built the fortified colony of Mazagão as one of the stops on the route to India. They kept it until 1769. The city fortifications followed the principles of Renaissance military engineering, with a star fort plan. Inside the walls, several historic buildings have been preserved, including the Manueline Church of the Assumption and the cistern.
Rabat, Modern Capital and Historic City: a Shared Heritage	People walking along the monumental fortress walls	Rabat-Salé-Kénitra	2012	1401; ii, iv (cultural)	Rabat was rebuilt as the capital of the French protectorate from 1912 to the 1930s. The city is a good example of early 20th century urban planning and is one of the biggest and most ambitious urban projects of the period in Africa. The modern city integrates the buildings from the earlier periods, including the 12th century Kasbah of the Udayas (walls pictured), Hassan Tower, and the Almohad walls and ramparts.

== Tentative list ==
In addition to sites inscribed on the World Heritage List, member states can maintain a list of tentative sites that they may consider for nomination. Nominations for the World Heritage List are only accepted if the site was previously listed on the tentative list. Morocco lists 14 properties on its tentative list.

Tentative sites
Site	Image	Location (region)	Year listed	UNESCO criteria	Description
Moulay Idriss Zerhoun	Inner court of a mosque with tiles on the floor and a yellow minaret	Fès-Meknès	1995	ii, iv, vi (cultural)	The town was founded on the slopes of Zerhoun mountain in the 8th century by Idris I, the first major Muslim ruler of Morocco. There are numerous religious monuments in the town, including the mausoleum complex of Idris I (pictured).
Taza and the Great Mosque		Fès-Meknès	1995	ii (cultural)	Strategically located on the crossroads between the east and west of the country, Taza rose to prominence in the 12th century during the Almohad period when several defensive structures, including walls and bastions, were built. The Great Mosque also dates to that period. It houses a massive chandelier (pictured).
Tinmal Mosque	Horseshoe arches in the mosque	Marrakesh–Safi	1995	ii, v (cultural)	The mosque, located in the village of Tinmel in the High Atlas, was built to commemorate Ibn Tumart, the founder of the Almohad dynasty.
The city of Lixus	Ancient ruins with remains of standing columns	Tanger-Tetouan-Al Hoceima	1995	ii, iii, iv (cultural)	According to ancient authors, Lixus was one of the first cities in the western Mediterranean. It was occupied from the 8th century BCE to 14th century CE. There are five major stratigraphic phases, Phoenician, Punic, Mauretanian, Roman, and Islamic. The complex includes the remains of several pre-Roman and Roman temples and a large complex to produce salted meat.
El Gour	A large burial mound made of stone blocks	Fès-Meknès	1995	iii (cultural)	El Gour is a tumulus, or a burial mound, built in the 4th century BCE for an important person. It is constructed from cut stone blocks arranged in the form of circular steps.
Taforalt Cave	Entrance to a cave, archaeological equipment	Oriental	1995	v (cultural)	Taforalt Cave is an important archaeological site from the Paleolithic period. Excavations have uncovered artifacts form the Iberomaurusian lithic industry, as well as a necropolis with about one hundred individuals from the Mechta-Afalou people, dating back around 20,000 years.
Talassemtane National Park	A river gorge and a broken bridge	Tanger-Tetouan-Al Hoceima	1998	vii, x (natural)	The national park, located close to Chefchaouen, features limestone formations such as mountain peaks, gorges, caves, and cliffs. It is home to the endemic Moroccan fir.
The area of the dragon tree ajgal	Dragon tree in front of a building	Souss-Massa	1998	vii, viii, ix, x (natural)	The area features a pre-steppe ecosystem and is home to endemic plant species, including Dracaena draco ajgal, also known as the dragon tree (pictured), and the argan tree.
Khnifiss Lagoon	Desert dunes with some water in the background	Guelmim-Oued Noun	1998	vii, x (natural)	The lagoon, covering 60,000 ha (150,000 acres), offers different habitats in an otherwise austere desert environment. Prehistoric archaeological remains have been found in the area.
Dakhla National Park		Dakhla-Oued Ed-Dahab	1998	x (natural)	The area is rich in numerous animal and plant species that live in arid climates. The coast is home to a population of monk seals. The park is located in the disputed territory of Western Sahara.
Figuig Oasis	Settlement in an oasis, a minaret, palm trees and mountains in the background	Oriental	2011	iii, iv, v (cultural)	The oasis in the Ksour Range close to the border with Algeria is characterized by traditional earthen architecture. Water sources support growing of date palms, and there are numerous gardens, irrigation channels, and ponds that create a micro climate different than in the surrounding desert.
Casablanca, a twentieth-century city, crossroads of influences	Buildings in Casablanca from the early 20th century	Casablanca-Settat	2013	ii, iv (cultural)	The centre of Casablanca was entirely built in the 20th century. The architecture reflects the ideas and influences of different architectural styles from North Africa, Europe, and the United States, including Neo-Moorish, Neoclassical, and Art Deco.
String of oases at Tighmert, pre-Saharan region of Wad Noun		Guelmim-Oued Noun	2016	iii, iv, v (cultural)	The string of oases is located along the Wad Noun across a length of 30 km (19 mi). They support fortified villages, or ksars and palm groves. Due to the location on trans-Saharan trade routes, the oases are centres of annual and weekly markets. There are numerous archaeological remains in the area.
The Historic Centre of Tétouan	Fountain with palms and city with white houses going uphill in the background	Tanger-Tetouan-Al Hoceima	2024	ii, iv, v (cultural)	Tétouan is strategically located close to the Strait of Gibraltar. It was settled by the families leaving Andalusia in the 15th century. In the early 20th century, it became the capital of the Spanish protectorate in Morocco. The historic centre has two sections, the medina with traditional Islamic architecture, and the Ensanche ("an extension"), which was built by the Spanish following the urban plan typical of 19th century Spanish cities.

== See also ==
- List of intangible cultural heritage in Morocco
