= Medina of Essaouira =

World Heritage site in Morocco

Coordinates: 31.5144°N 9.7689°W

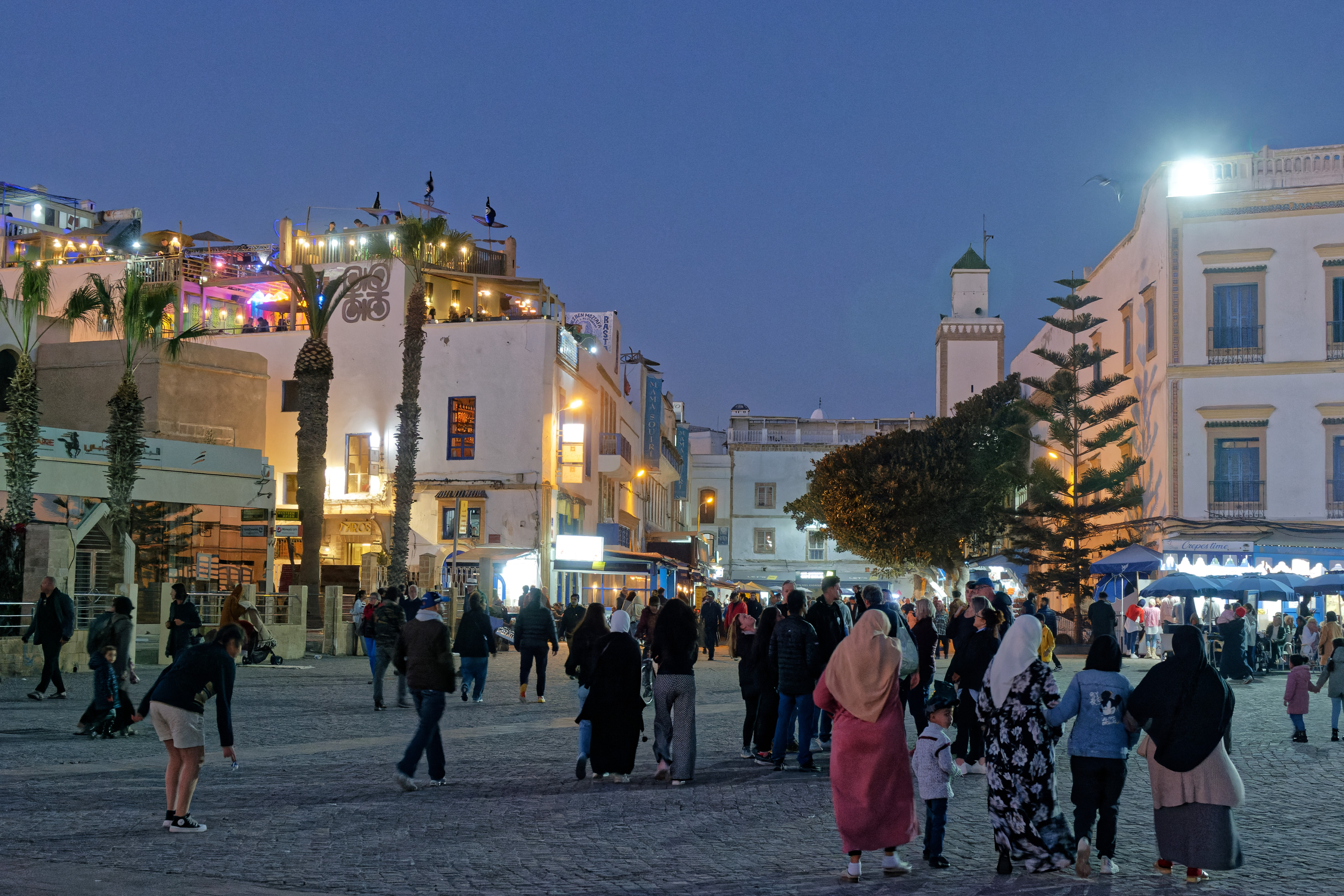
Medina square near the waterfront.

The Medina of Essaouira, formerly Mogador, is a Medina quarter in Essaouira, Morocco. It was designated by the UNESCO as a World Heritage Site in 2001.

== History ==
Essaouira is an exceptional example of a late-18th-century fortified town, built according to the principles of contemporary European military architecture in a North African context. Since its foundation, it has been a major international trading seaport, linking Morocco and its Saharan hinterland with Europe and the rest of the world.

Early individuals responsible for the foundation and architecture of the city include Sultan Mohammed ben Abdallah and architect Théodore Cornut. From 1767, Ahmed El Eulj managed the design of the city and medina.

== Description ==
Essaouira was a planned city, and the medina took on a degree of symmetry featuring four general quadrants. It was constructed to the limits of the rocky peninsula, and fortified city walls further define the boundaries of the medina. The fortified port, also an element of the medina, is detached from the walled portion by a stretch of land to the west. Churches and a palace were also historically located in this western portion, while the Jewish Quarter found itself within the walls of the medina. Other elements of the medina include city gates, towers, markets, and alleyways.

=== Streets ===
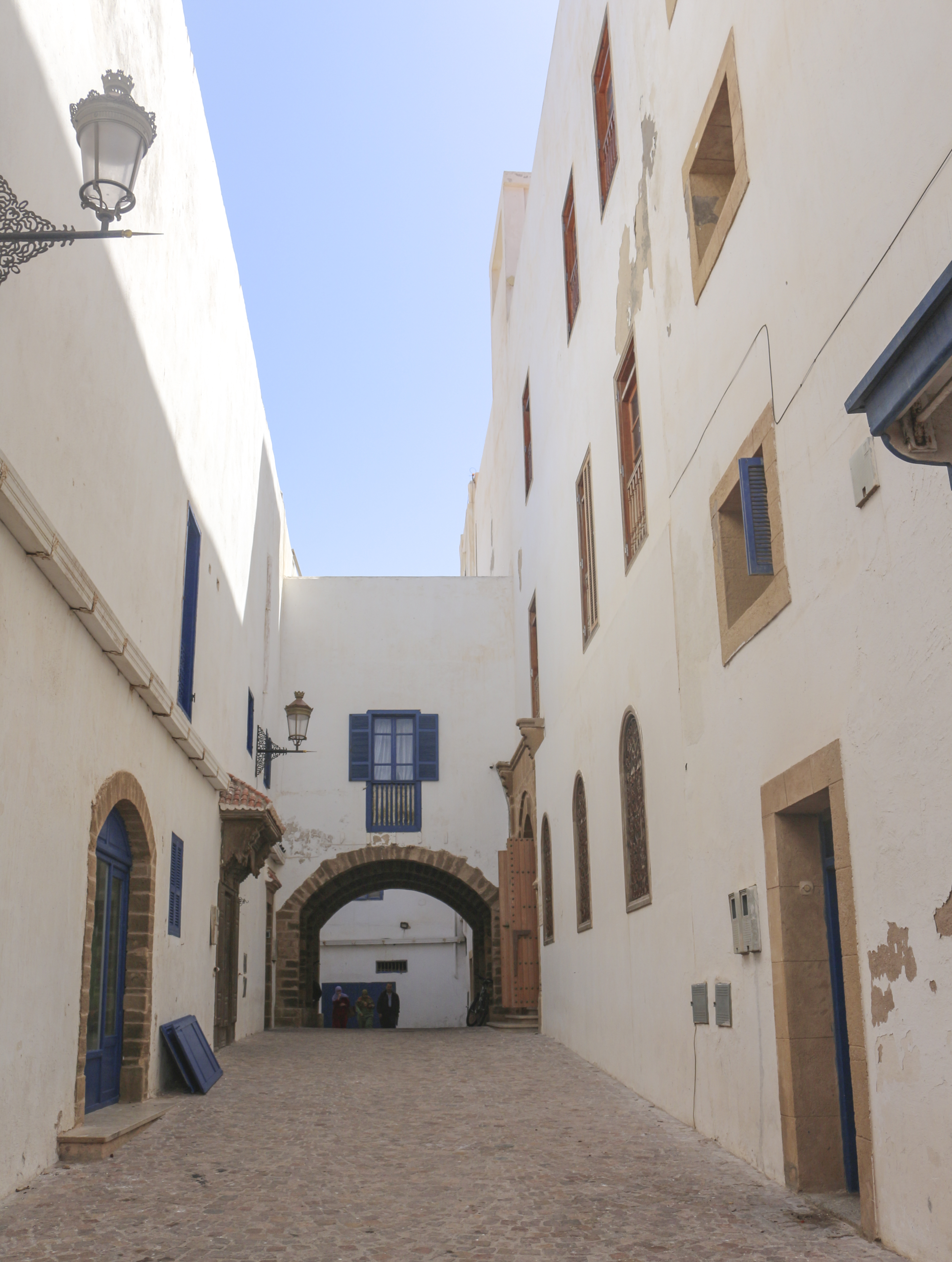
Medina alleyway

In the modern period, the two primary perpendicular streets are Rue Mohamed El Qory and Avenue Mohamed Zerktouni. Within the medina, each street leads to a city gate or bab, except the northern terminus of Rue Mohamed El Qory which ends at the city wall. The streets are primarily used by pedestrians.

=== City Gates ===
The medina has several city gates. Notable gates include Bab Doukkala to the northeast, Bab Marrakesh to the southeast, and the gate to the port to the southwest. The port gate features a Hijri calendar date of 1184. In the 19th century, writer Donald Mackenzie reported that the gates were closed for the evenings at sunset.

=== Jewish Quarter ===
The Jewish Quarter, or mellah, was developed around 1807 or 1808 in the northeast corner of the medina. The population of Jews in the city reached approximately 10,000 at its peak, and a small population of Jews lived outside of the quarter. In the late 1990s, the population of the traditional mellah district was about 7,000. The quarter contains the Slat Lkahal Synagogue.

=== Kasbah District ===
The Kasbah District is located near the port in the western portion of the medina, and it historically contained merchants, affluent Muslims and Jews, foreigners, government officials, and Anglo influences. Historically, up to 1000 wealthier Jews resided in the kasbah instead of the mellah. The district also contained a synagogue.

== Gallery ==
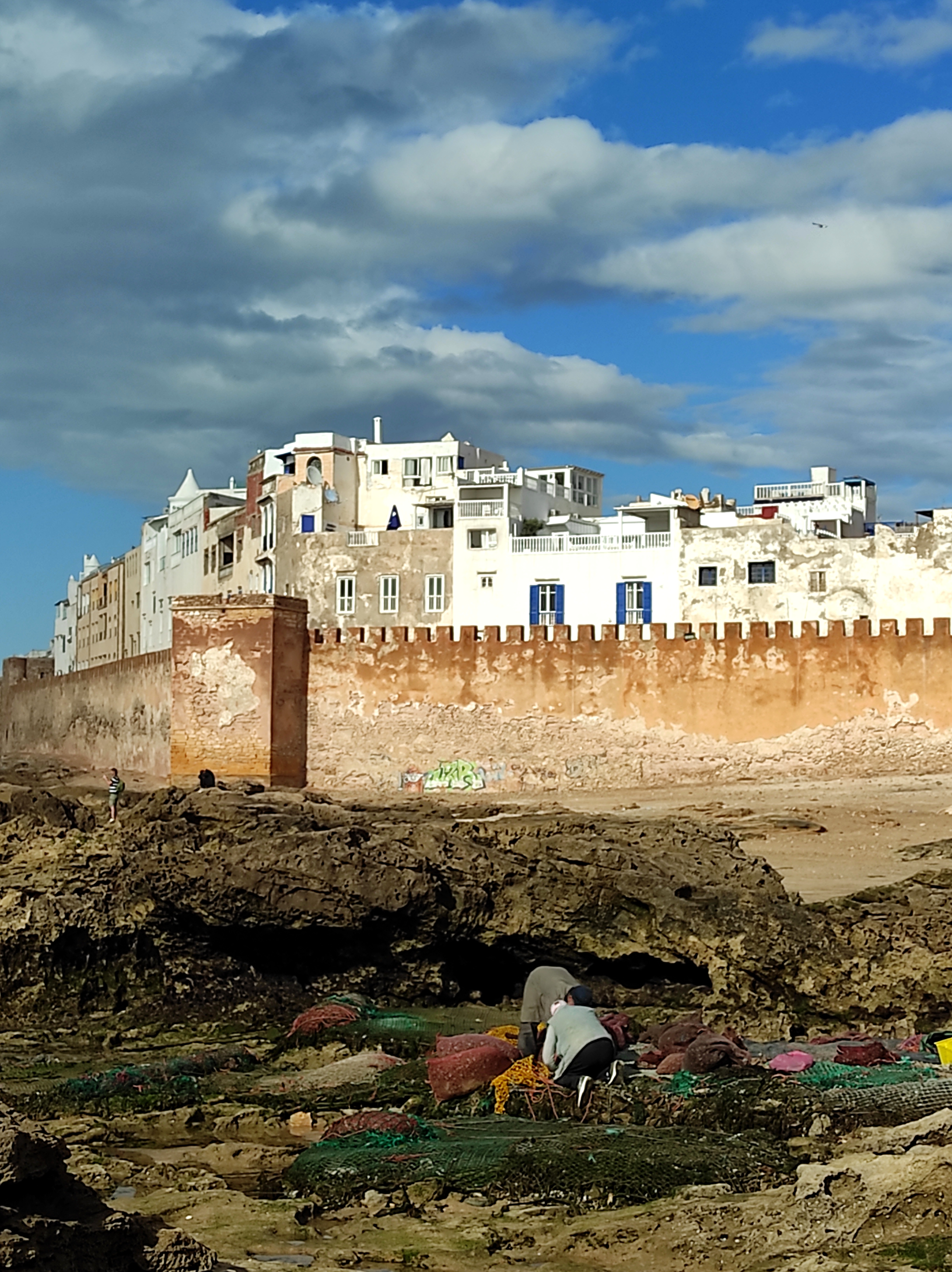
Seaward Walls of the Medina of Essaouira

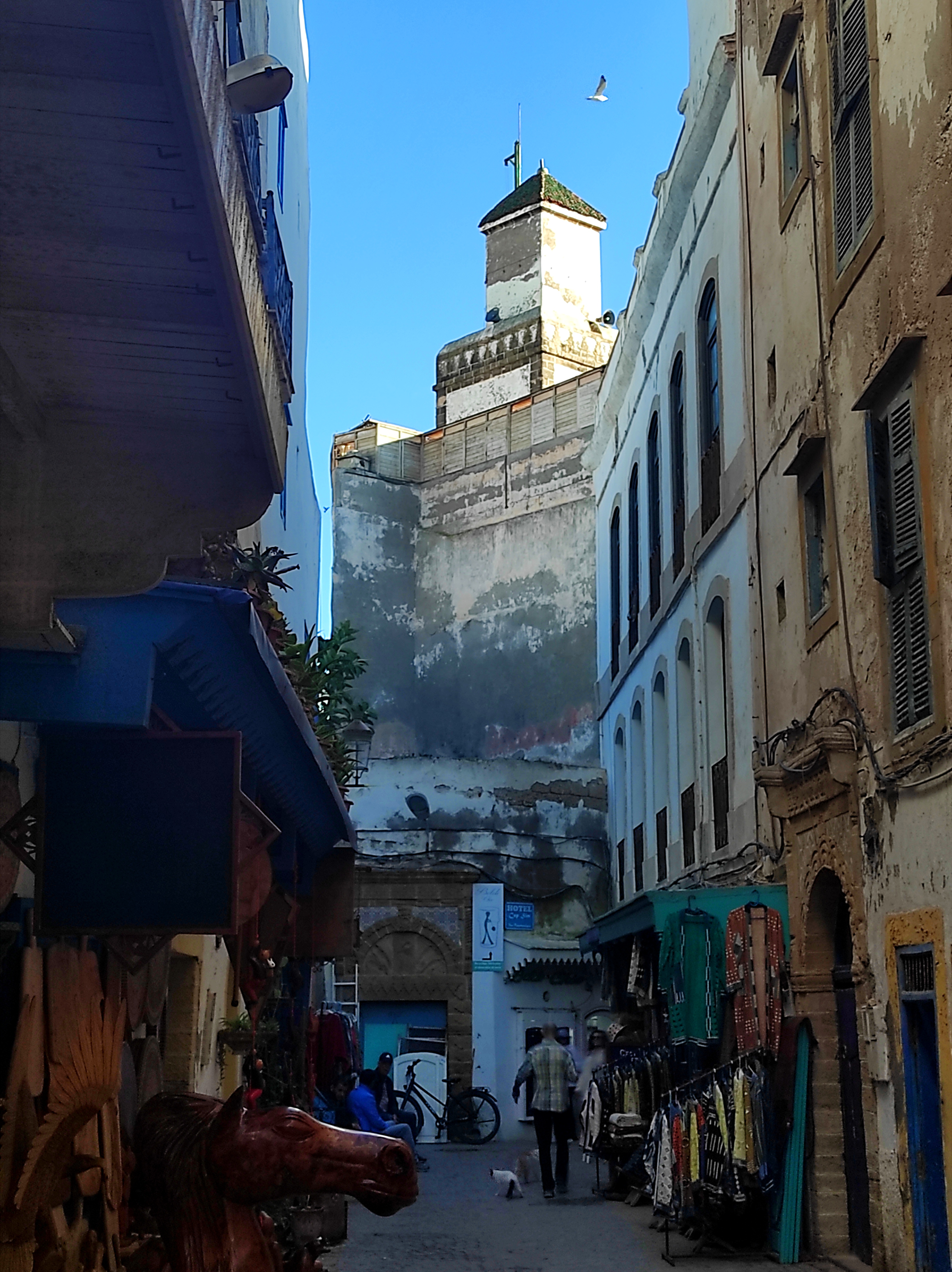
Medina Street and Fortified Tower

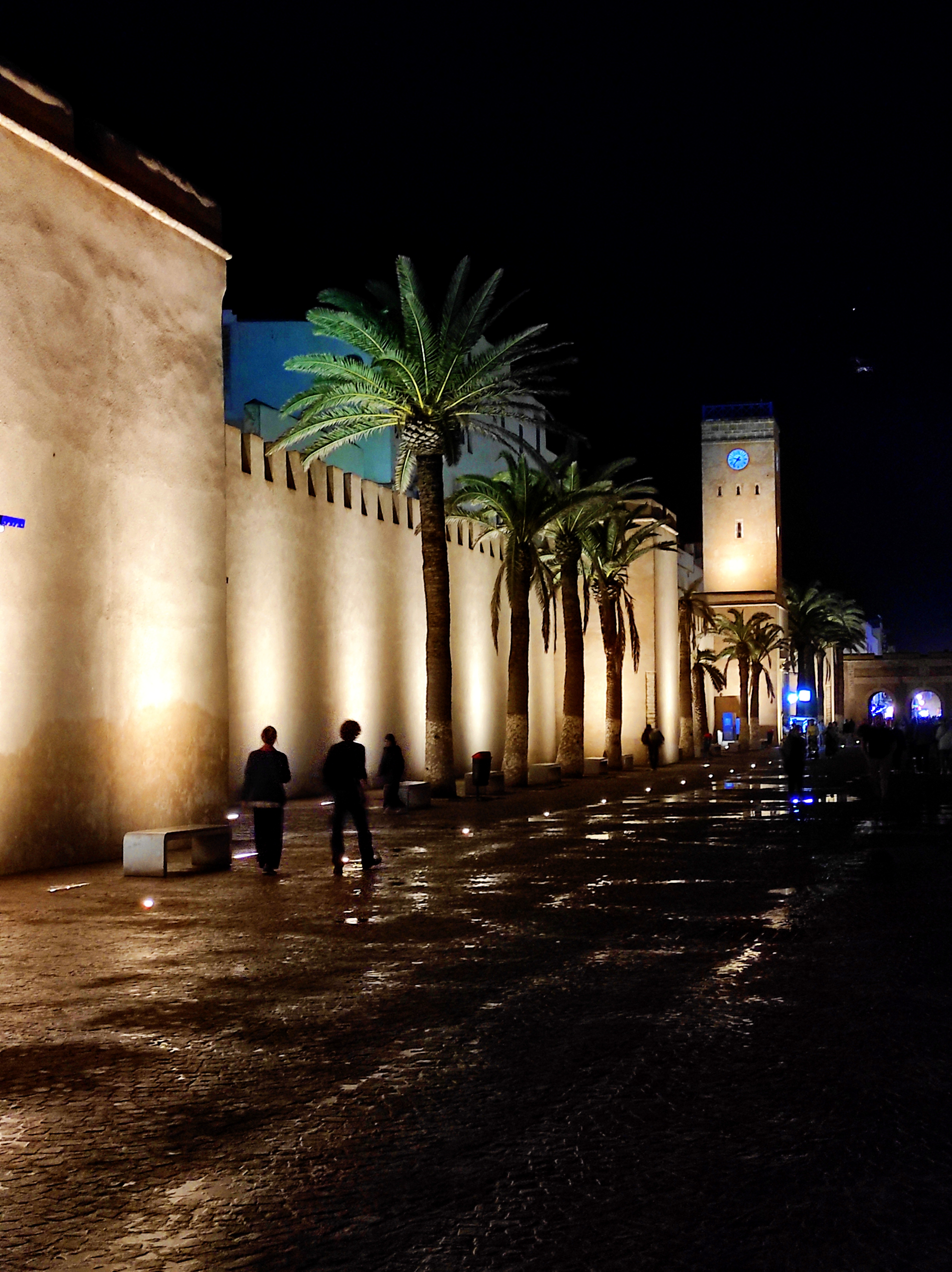
Essaouira Ramparts at Night

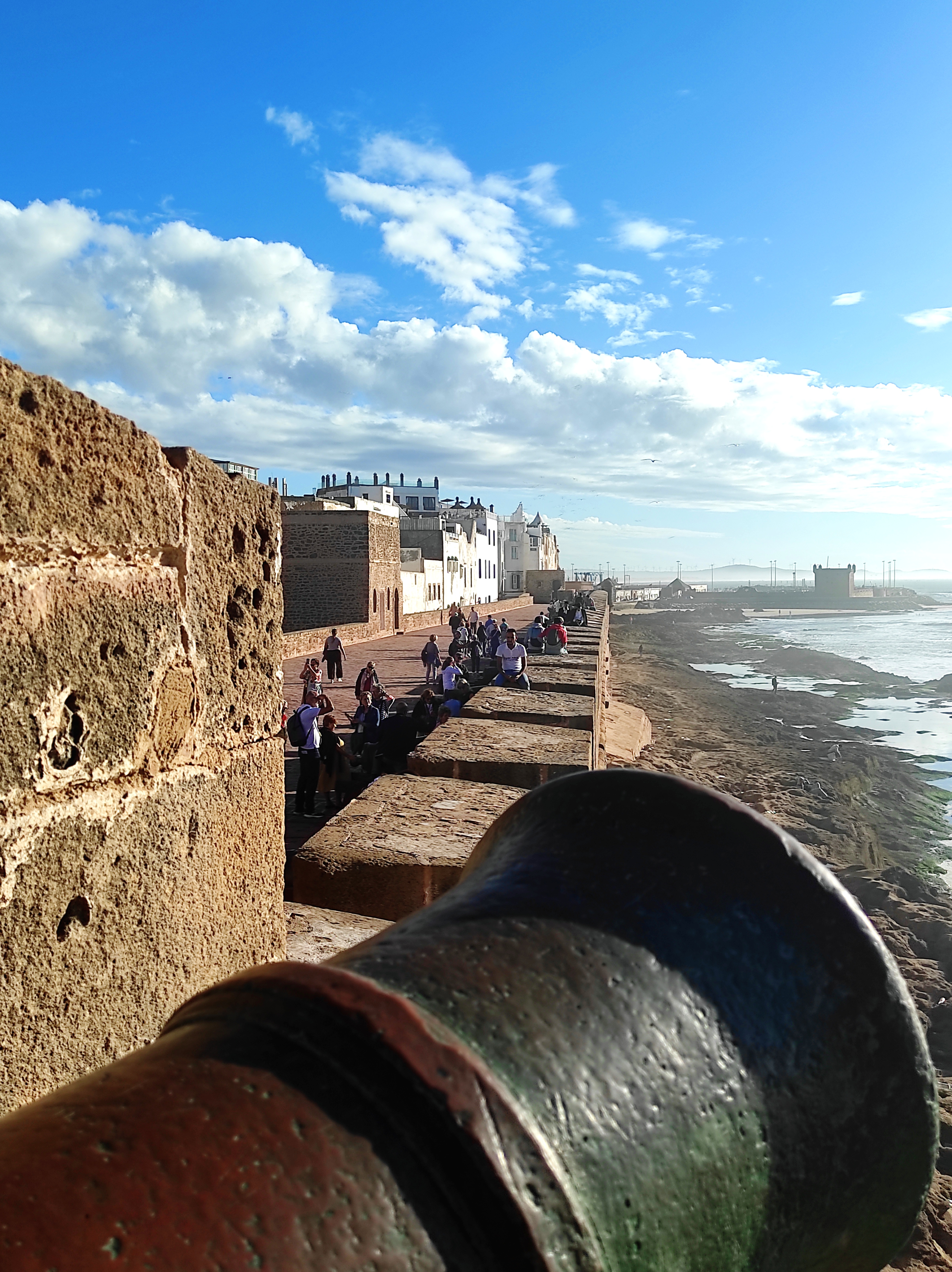
Cannon on Skala de la Ville

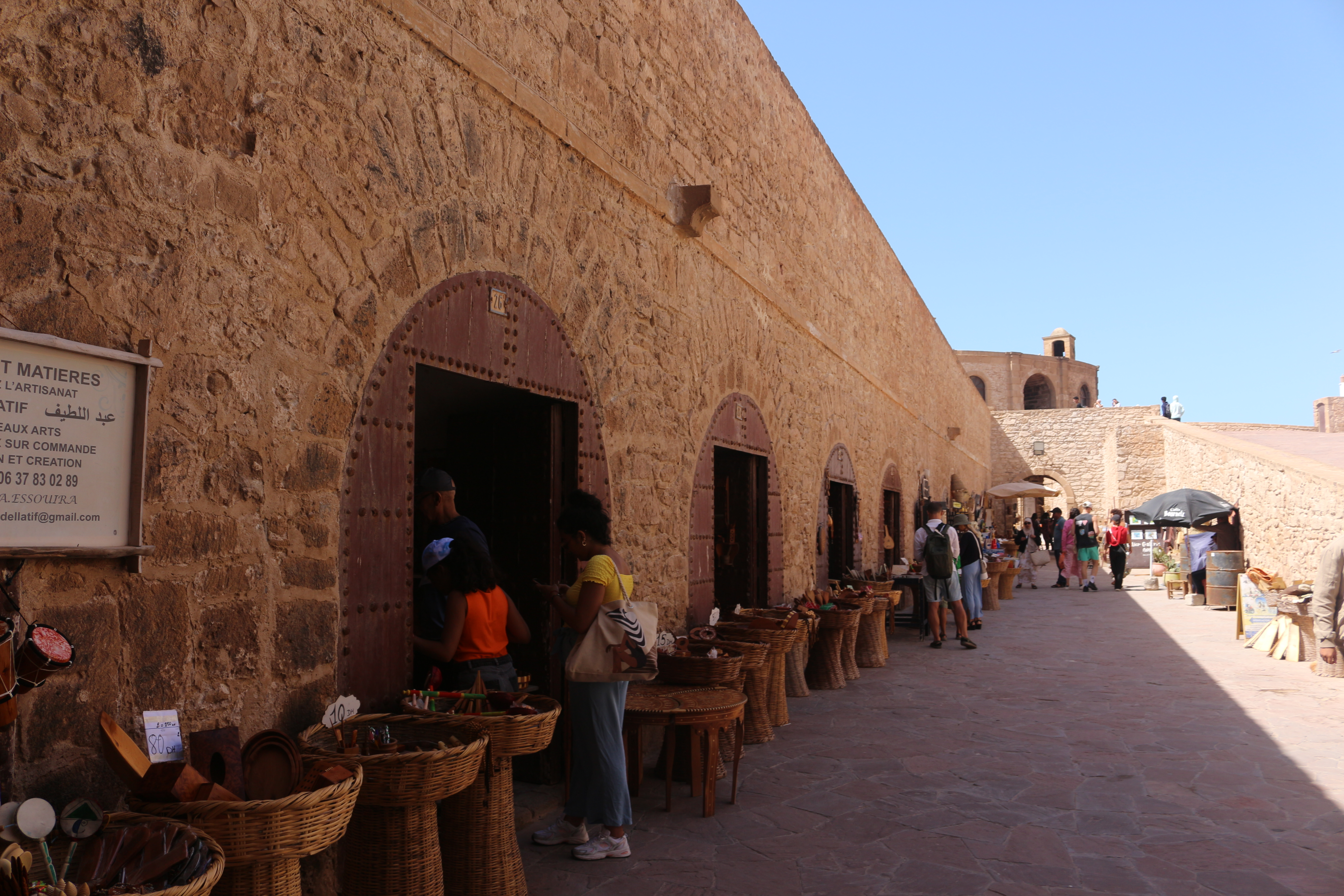
Traditional Handicrafts Market

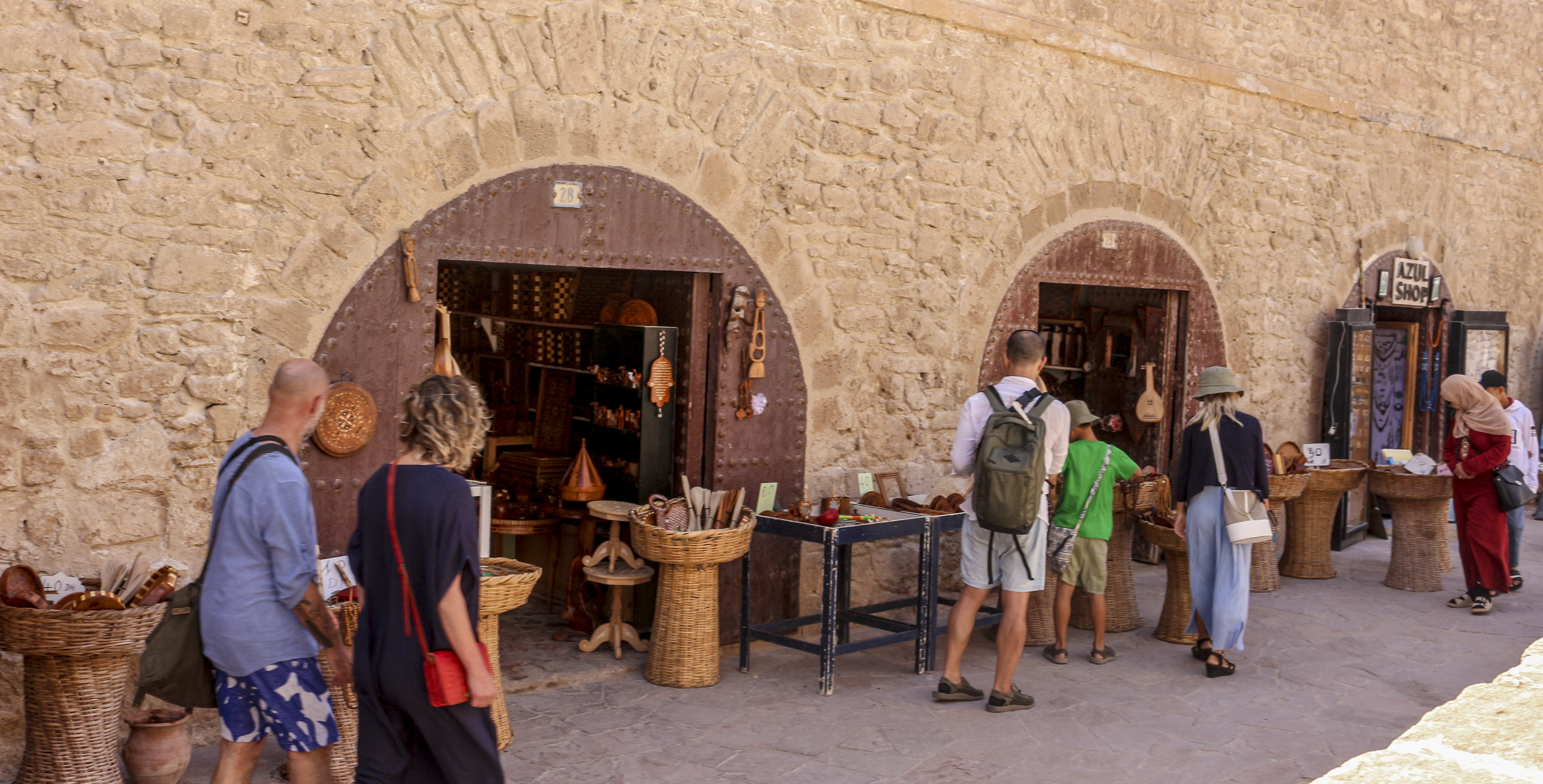
Traditional Handicrafts Market

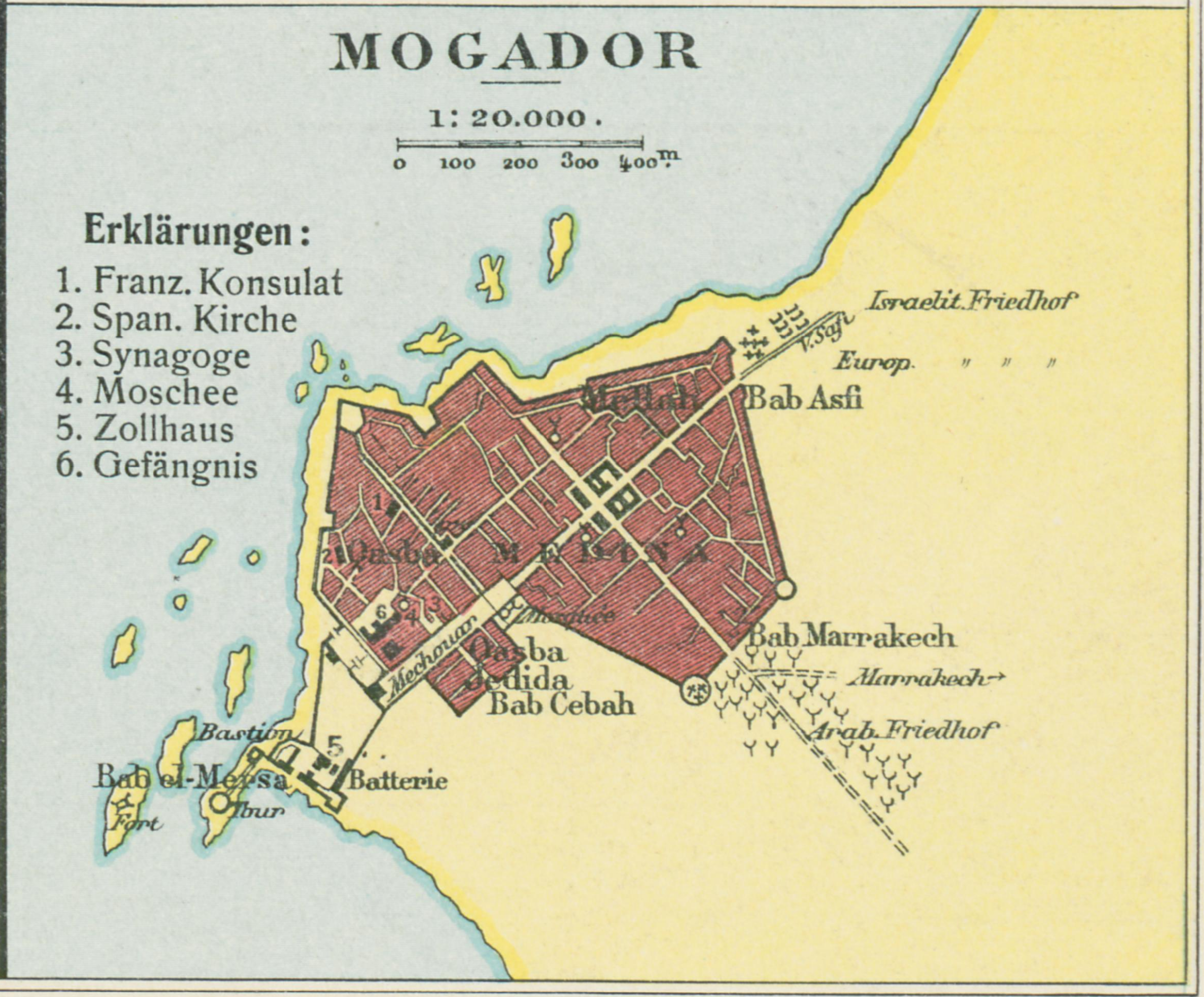
Layout of the medina. Note the two perpendicular streets that form the quadrants.

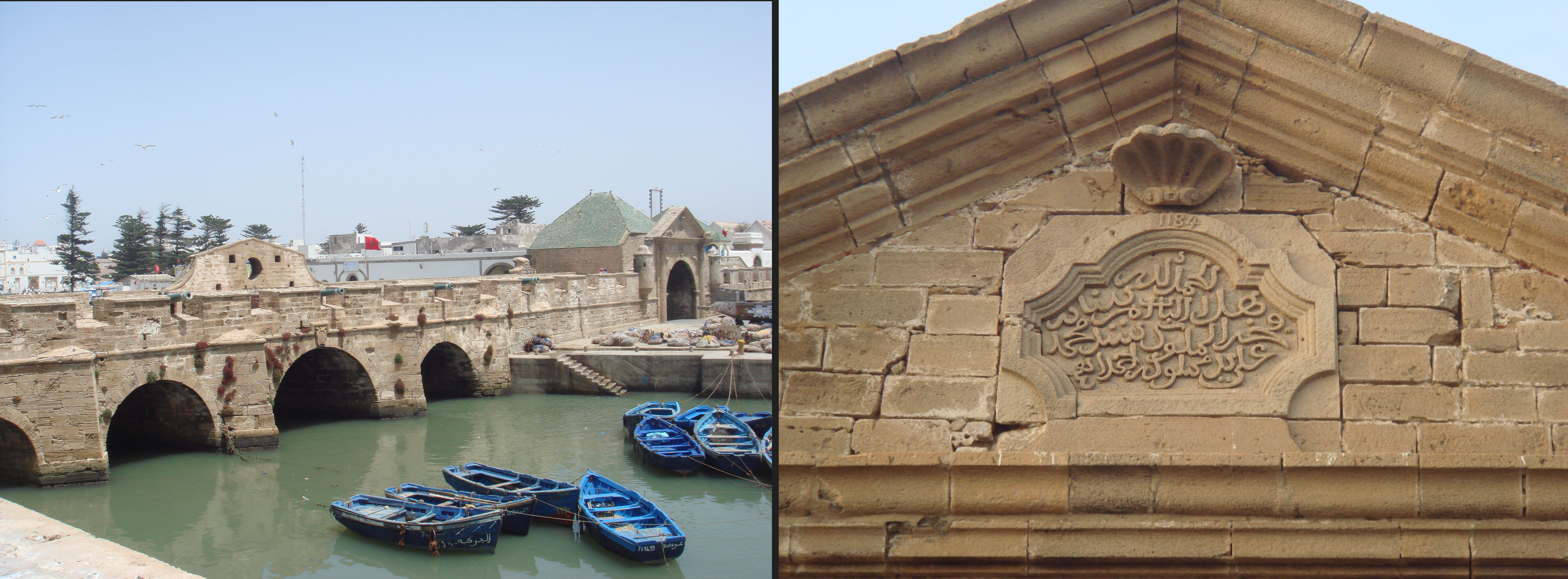
Port gate with 1184 AH visible in pediment

== See also ==
- List of World Heritage Sites in Morocco

== Sources ==
This article incorporates text from a free content work. Licensed under CC BY-SA IGO 3.0 (license statement/permission). Text taken from Medina of Essaouira (formerly Mogador), UNESCO World Heritage Centre.
