= Chaim Pinto Synagogue =

Synagogue in Essaouira, Morocco

- Arabic: كنيس حاييم بينتو
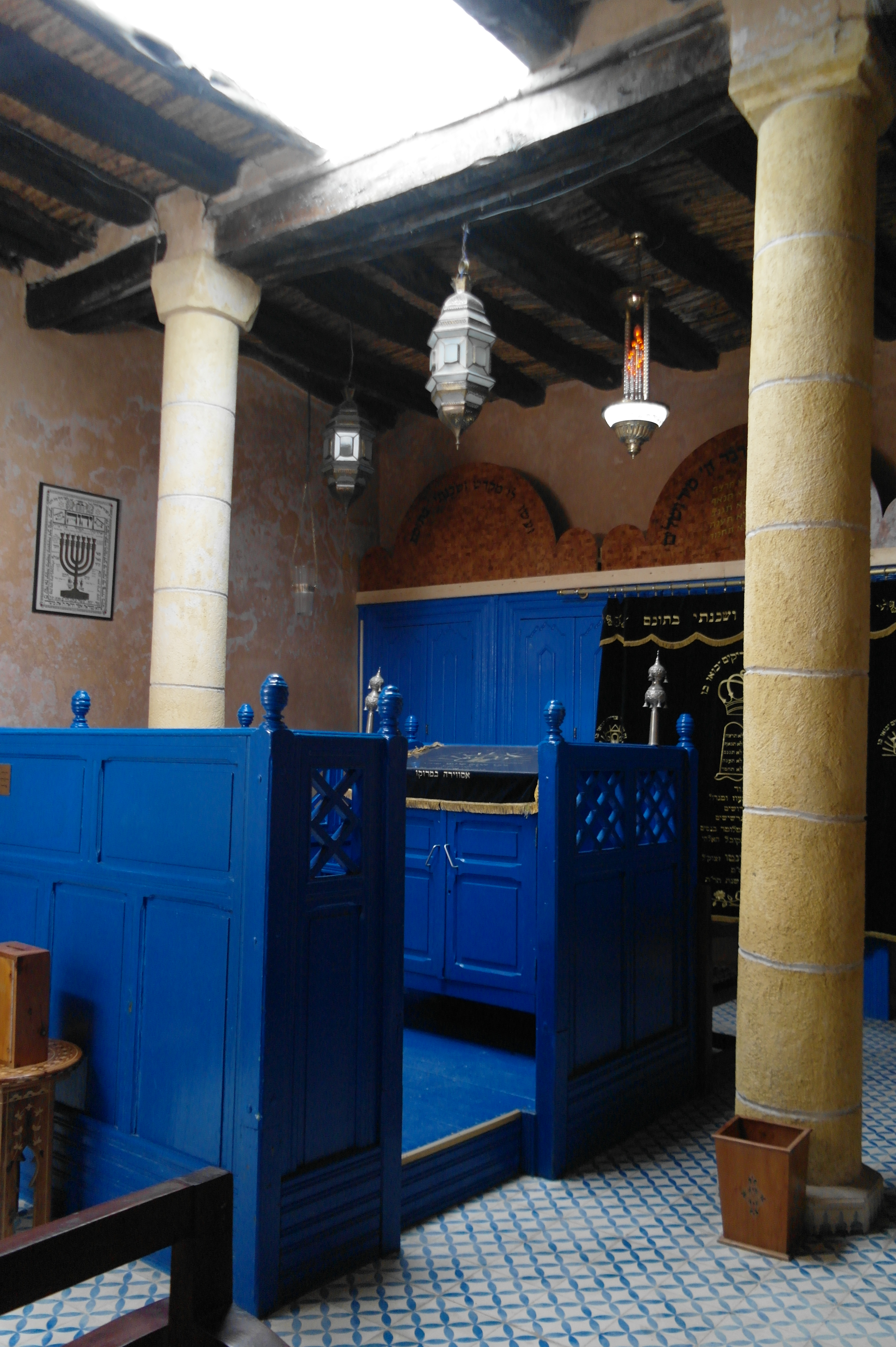
- The synagogue interior, in 2018

- Location of the synagogue in Morocco

Religion
- Affiliation: Judaism
- Ecclesiastical or organizational status: Synagogue
- Status: Active (visitors only)

Location
- Location: Essaouira, Marrakesh-Safi
- Country: Morocco
- Interactive map of Chaim Pinto Synagogue
- Coordinates: 31°30′57″N 9°46′02″W

Architecture
- Type: Synagogue architecture

The Chaim Pinto Synagogue (Arabic: كنيس حاييم بينتو), an historic site in Essaouira, Marrakesh-Safi, Morocco, formerly known as Mogador, Morocco, was the home and synagogue of Rabbi Chaim Pinto. Although there is no longer a Jewish community in Essaouira, the building is an active synagogue, used when pilgrims or Jewish tour groups visit the city. The synagogue is on the second floor of a three-story, courtyard building inside the walls of the old city that also contained Rabbi Pinto's home and office. The building is of whitewashed plaster over masonry. The synagogue consists of a single large room. There are two women's sections, one across the courtyard and one on the third floor, both with windows looking into the synagogue. The synagogue room underwent a modern renovation, concealing the ceiling and column capitals, and painting the wood of the Torah ark and bimah light blue.

== See also ==
- History of the Jews in Morocco
- List of synagogues in Morocco
- Hiloula of Rabbi Haim Pinto
- Yoshiyahu Yosef Pinto, the Chief Rabbi of Morocco
