= Rabbi Meir Toledano Synagogue =

Synagogue in Meknes, Morocco

- Hebrew: בית הכנסת הרב מאיר טולדנו; Arabic: كنيس ربي مير طوليدانو
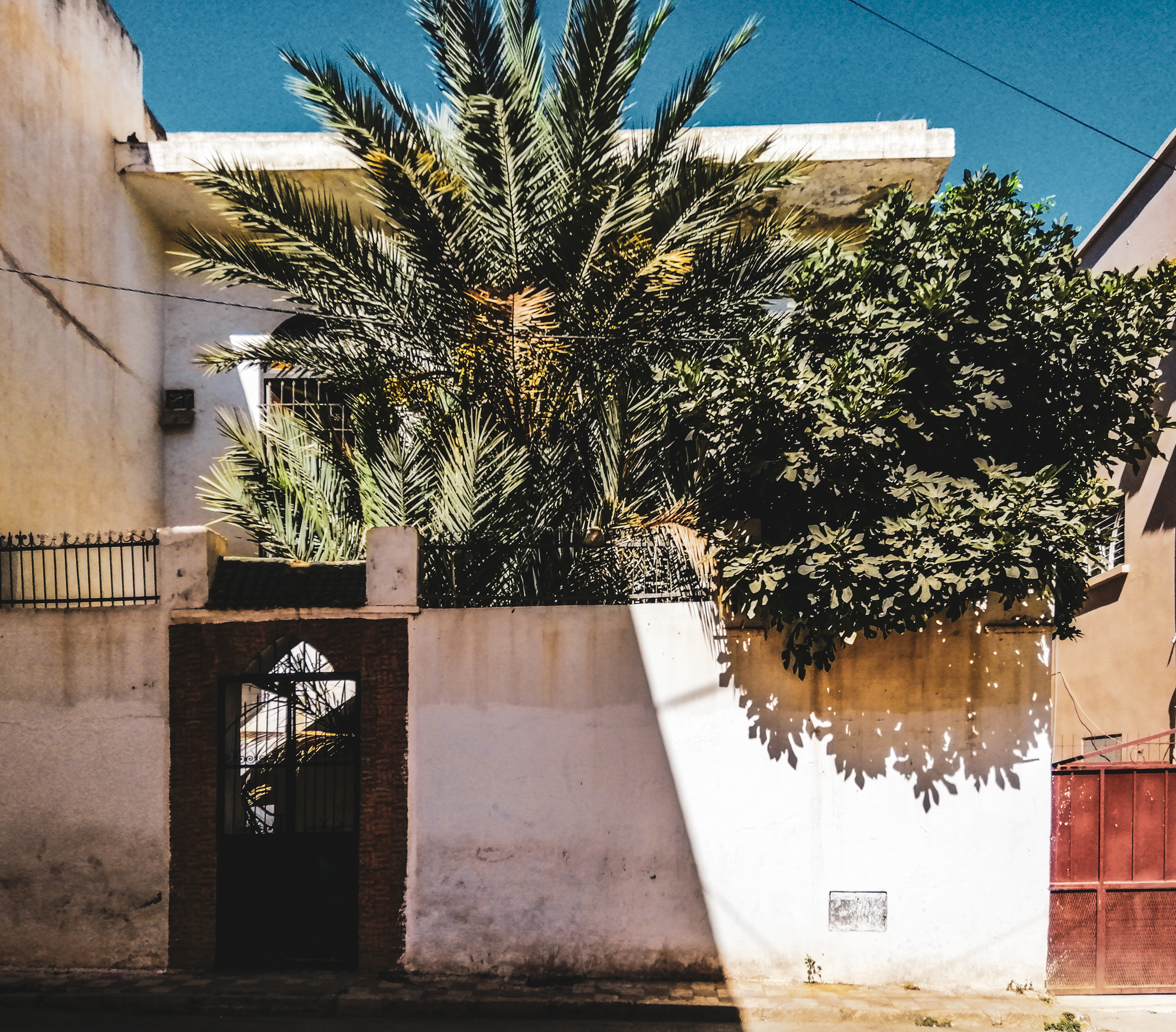
- The synagogue in 2020

- Location of the synagogue in Morocco

Religion
- Affiliation: Judaism
- Ecclesiastical or organizational status: Synagogue
- Status: Active

Location
- Location: Meknes
- Country: Morocco
- Interactive map of Rabbi Meir Toledano Synagogue
- Coordinates: 33°53′20″N 5°34′16″W

Architecture
- Type: Synagogue architecture
- Funded by: Toledano family
- Established: 13th century (as a congregation)
- Completed: 1646

The Rabbi Meir Toledano Synagogue (Hebrew: בית הכנסת הרב מאיר טולדנו; Arabic: كنيس ربي مير طوليدانو) is a synagogue located in the medina of Meknes, Morocco.

== History ==
According to tradition, the first construction of the synagogue occurred in the 13th century, known then as the Mahrit Synagogue. It was destroyed by an earthquake in 1630. It was rebuilt by the Toledano family (originally from Toledo) in 1646, following their arrival in Meknes.

The synagogue is named after Rabbi Meir Toledano, a rabbi of the Toledano family, who rose to fame by editing and publishing in 1803 his stepfather Moses ben Daniel's works on the Torah under the name Melekhet ha-Kodesh.

== See also ==
- History of the Jews in Morocco
- List of synagogues in Morocco
