= Jewish cemeteries, Essaouira =

Two cemeteries in Marrakech, Morocco

Coordinates: 31°31′03″N 9°45′50″W

The Jewish cemeteries of Essaouira are in the city of Essaouira, Morocco. They include the old cemetery which is located by the sea and the new cemetery located opposite the old one.

== Old cemetery ==
The old cemetery, also called the marine cemetery, is separated from the ocean by a single wall. It has 2400 tombstones all made of rocky stones, the oldest of which date from 1775. Very visited because it hosts the mausoleum of Rabbi Ḥaim Pinto, the old cemetery served until around 1875 as the main cemetery of the city which had a large Jewish community.

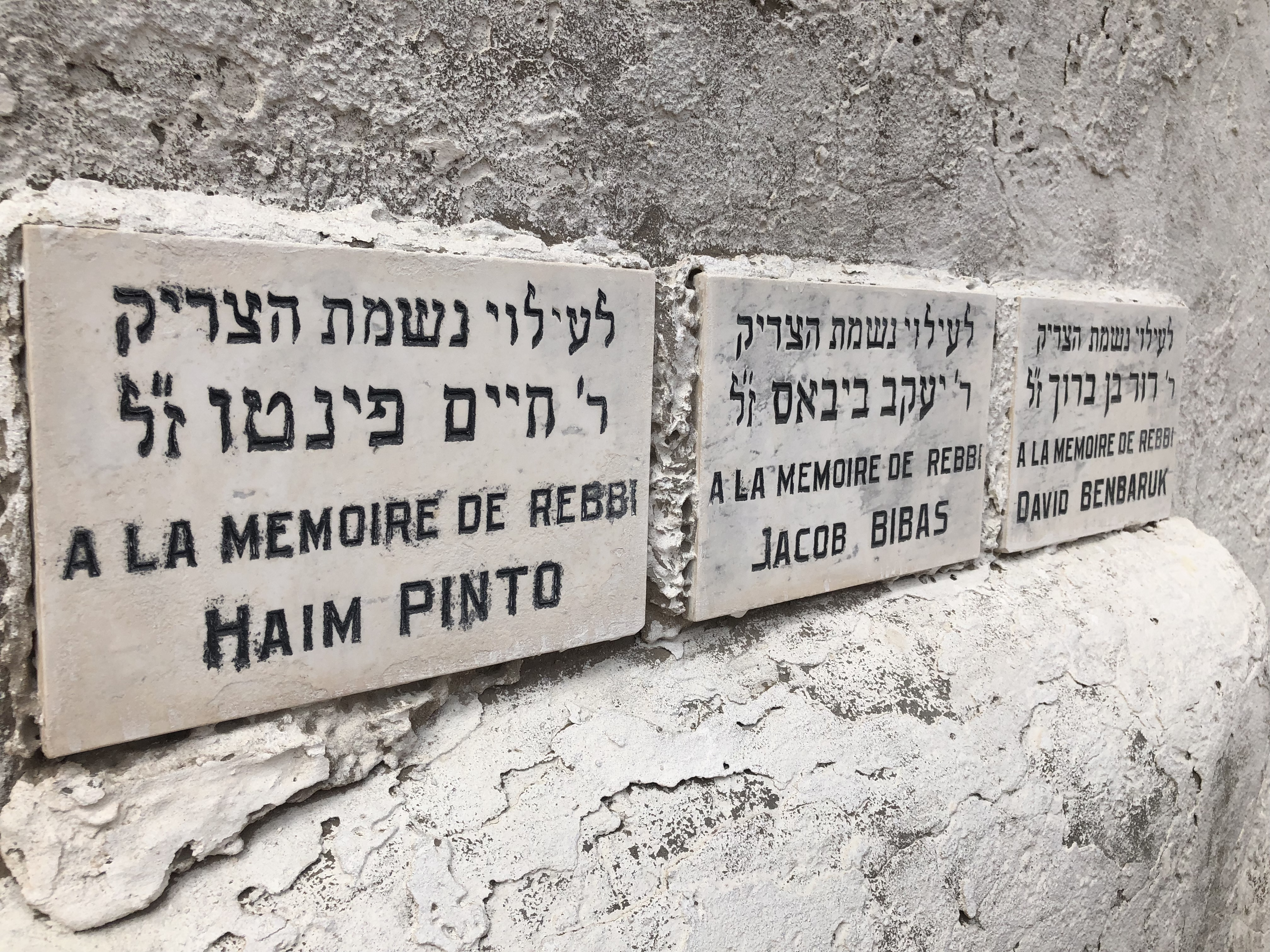
Tribute to the Rabbis of the city

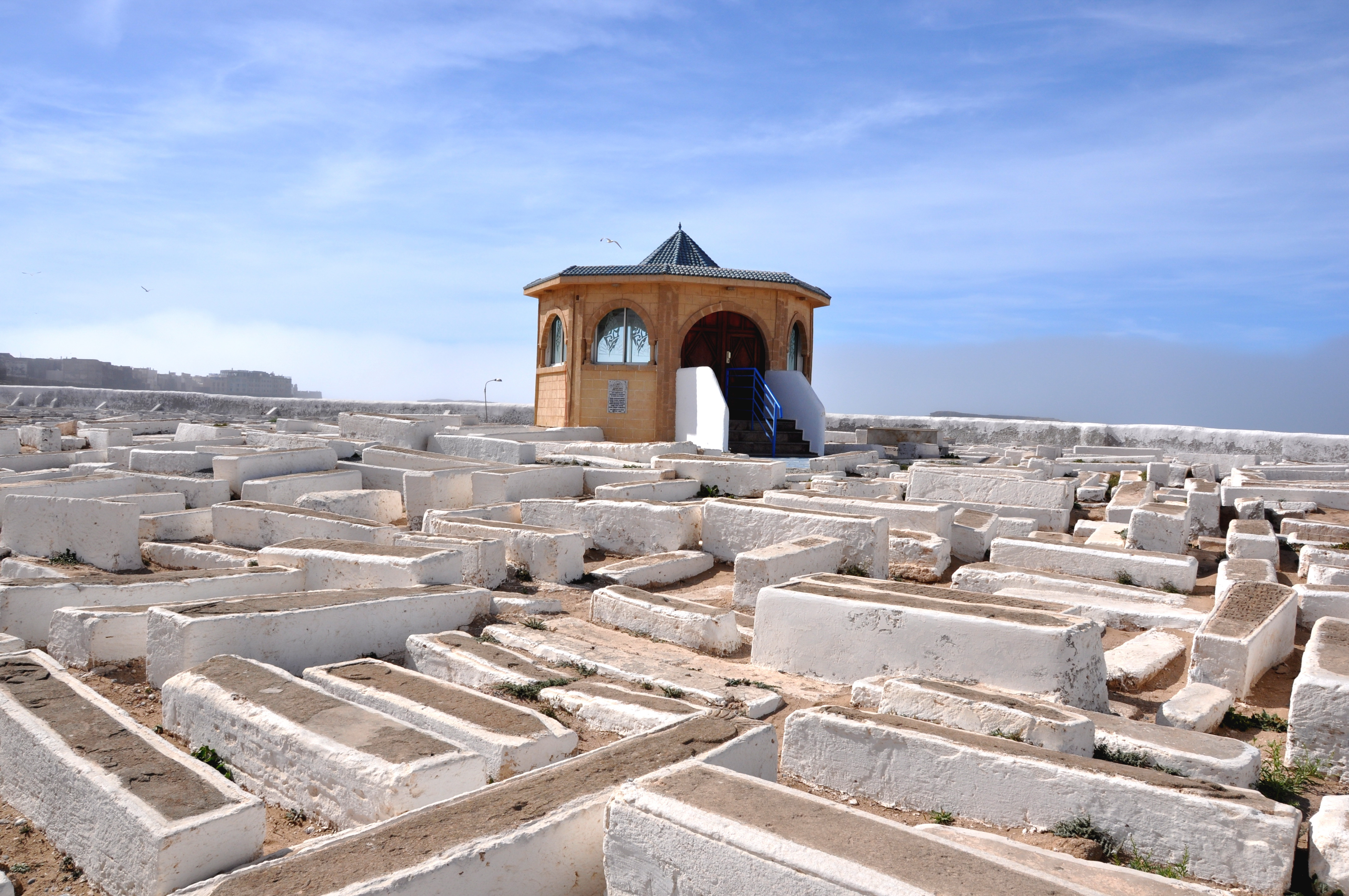
Mausoleum of Rabbi Haim Pinto

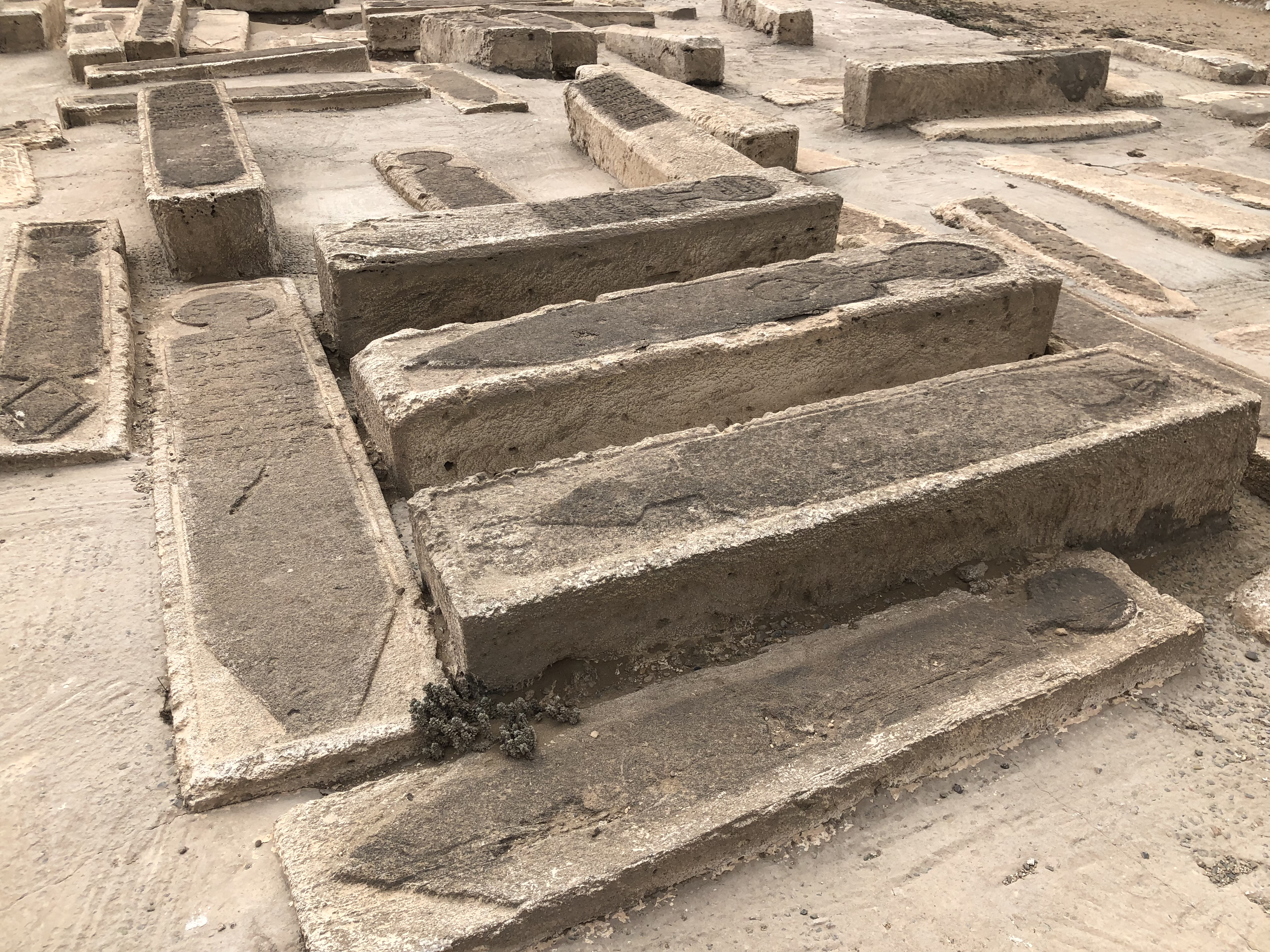
Tombstones of the old cemetery

== New cemetery ==
The new cemetery was founded in 1892, located opposite the old one. However, in 2010, Edmond Amran El Maleh was buried in the old cemetery at his request.

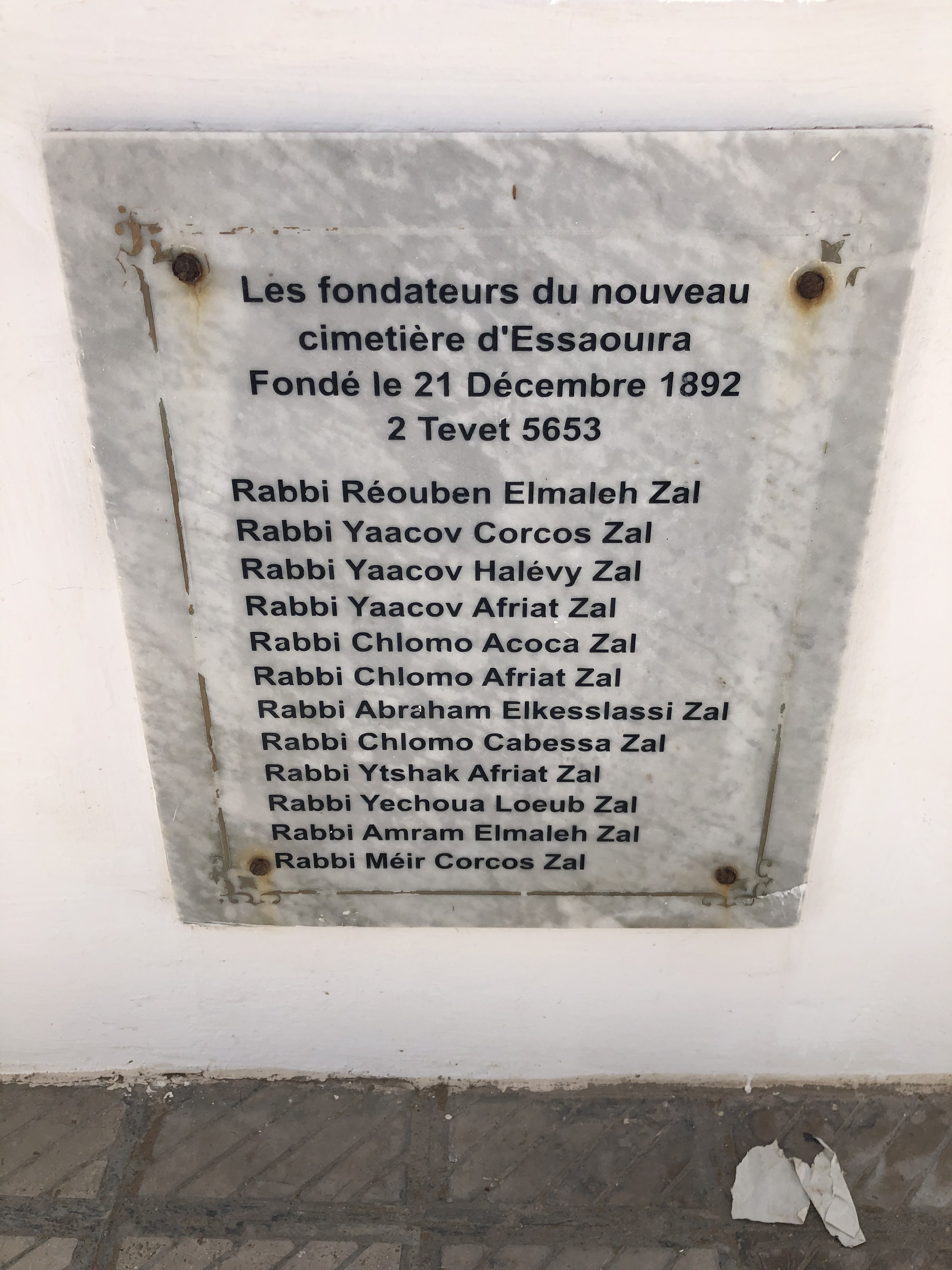
Tribute to the founders of the new cemetery

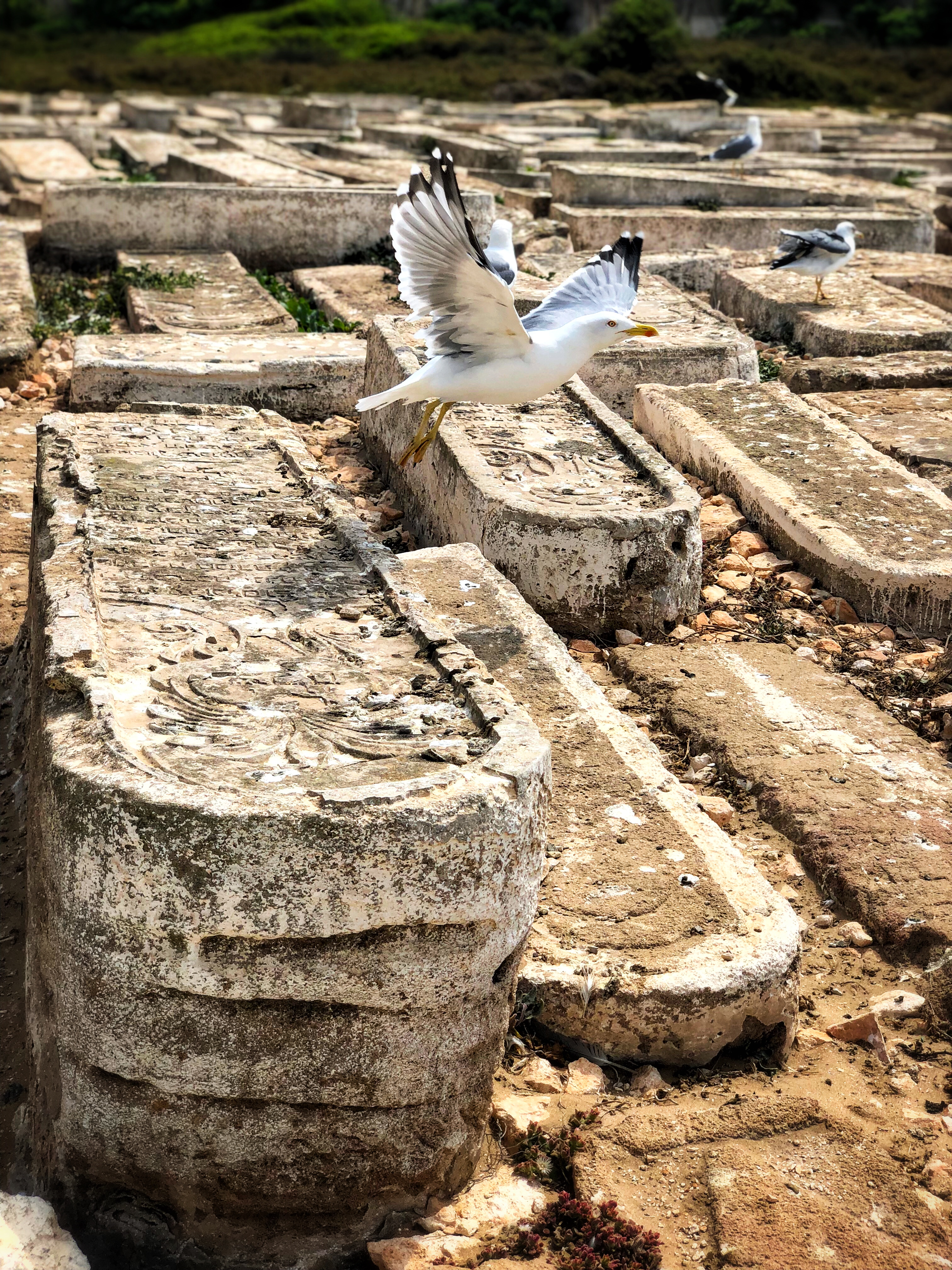
Tombstones of the new cemetery

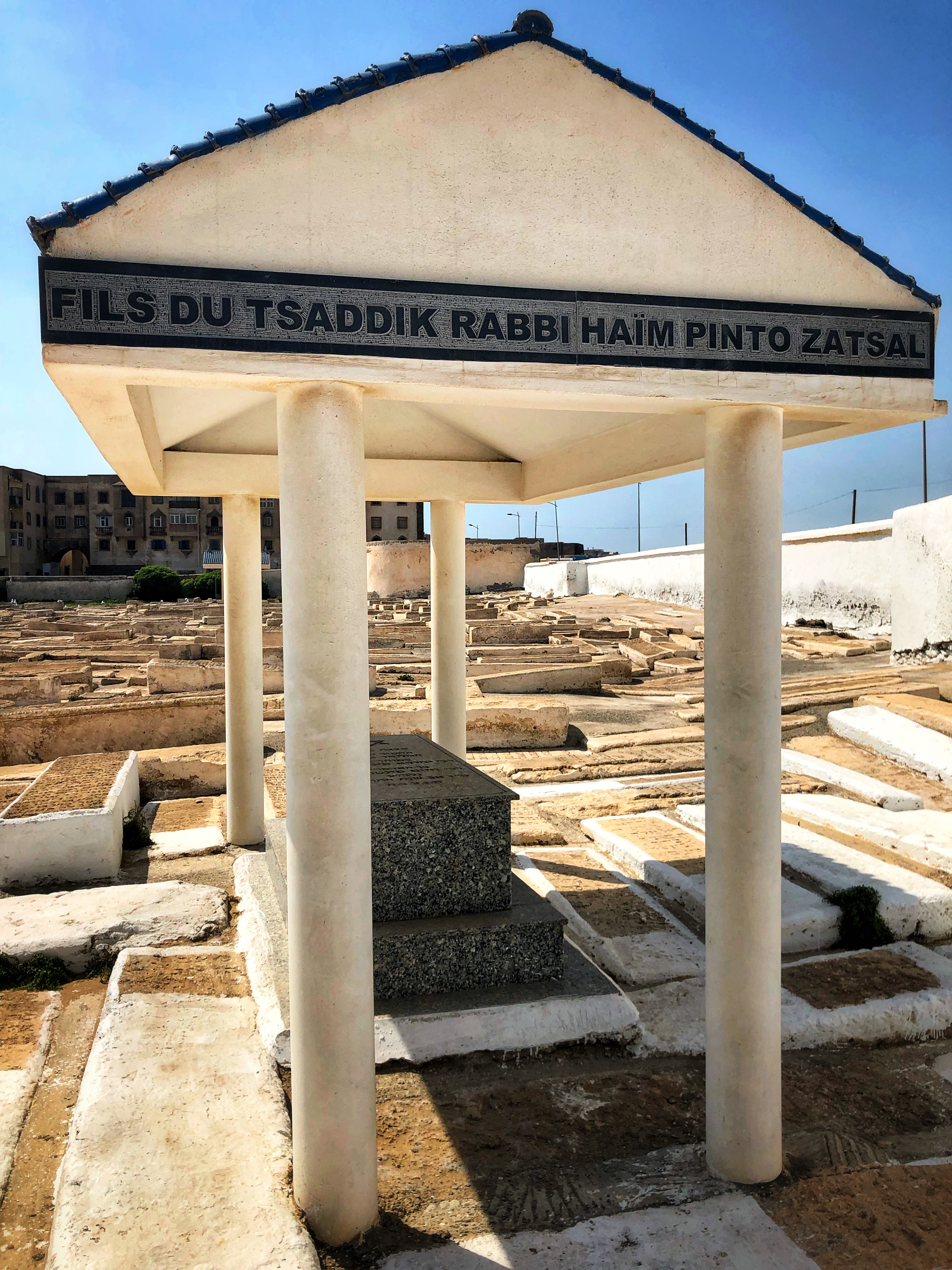
Tomb of the son of Rabbi Haim Pinto
