= Chaim Pinto =

Moroccan rabbi (1748–1845)

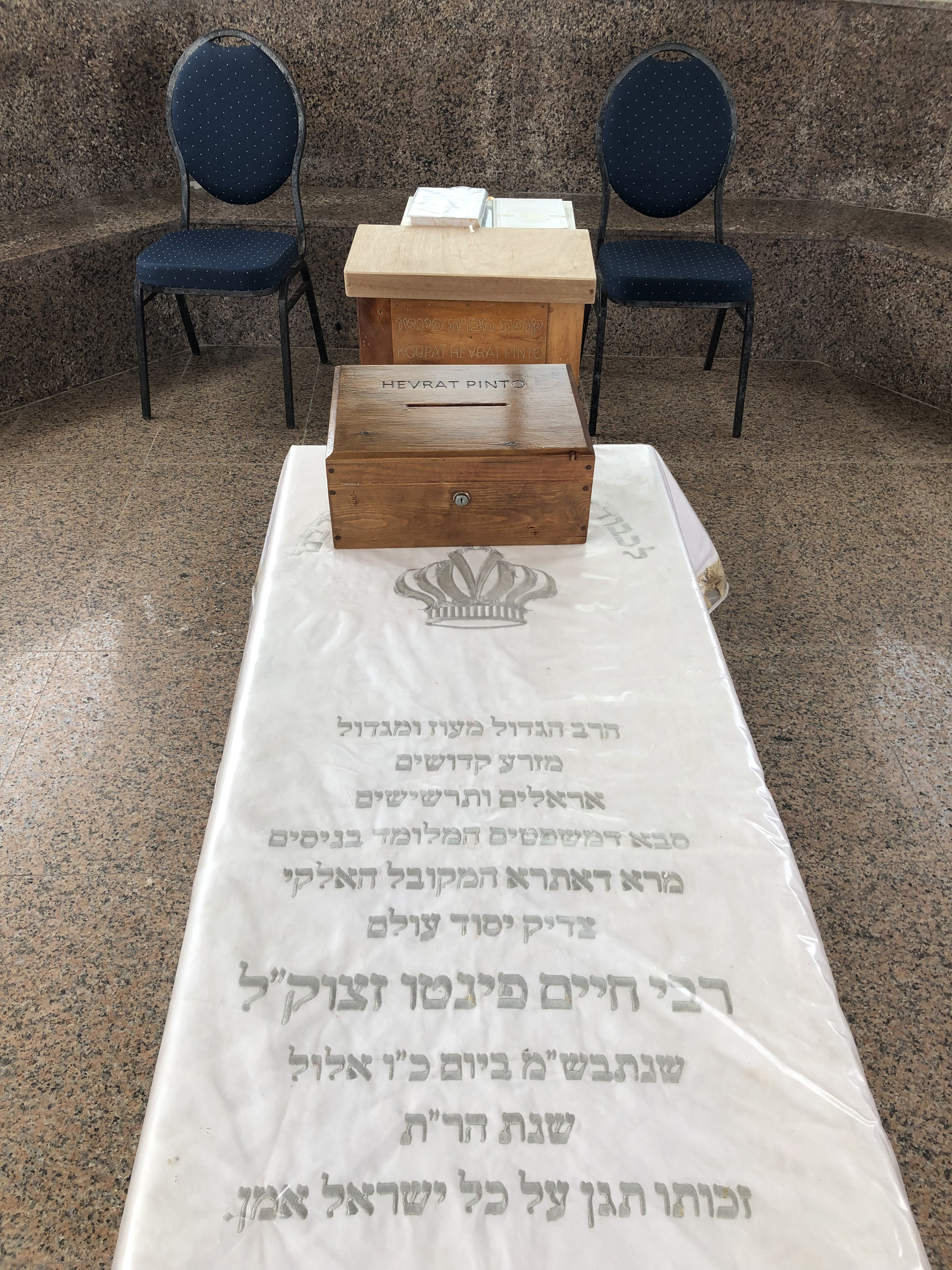
Pinto's tomb

Ḥaim Pinto (Hebrew: חיים פינטו; 1748–1845) was the leading rabbi in the seaport city of Essaouira, Morocco, known in his lifetime as Mogador, Morocco.

Annually on the anniversary of Pinto's death, (26 Elloul 5605, in the Hebrew calendar) Jews from around the world come on pilgrimage to pray at his grave in the old jewish cemetery of Essaouira.

According to legend his prayers were received in heaven in such a way that miracles resulted.

The Chaim Pinto Synagogue, the building that was Pinto's home, office and synagogue is preserved as an historic site.

His descendants include Yishayahu Yosef Pinto.
