= Rabbi Shalom Zaoui Synagogue =

Synagogue in Rabat, Morocco

- Hebrew: בית הכנסת רבי שלום זאווי; Arabic: كنيس ربي شالوم الزاوي
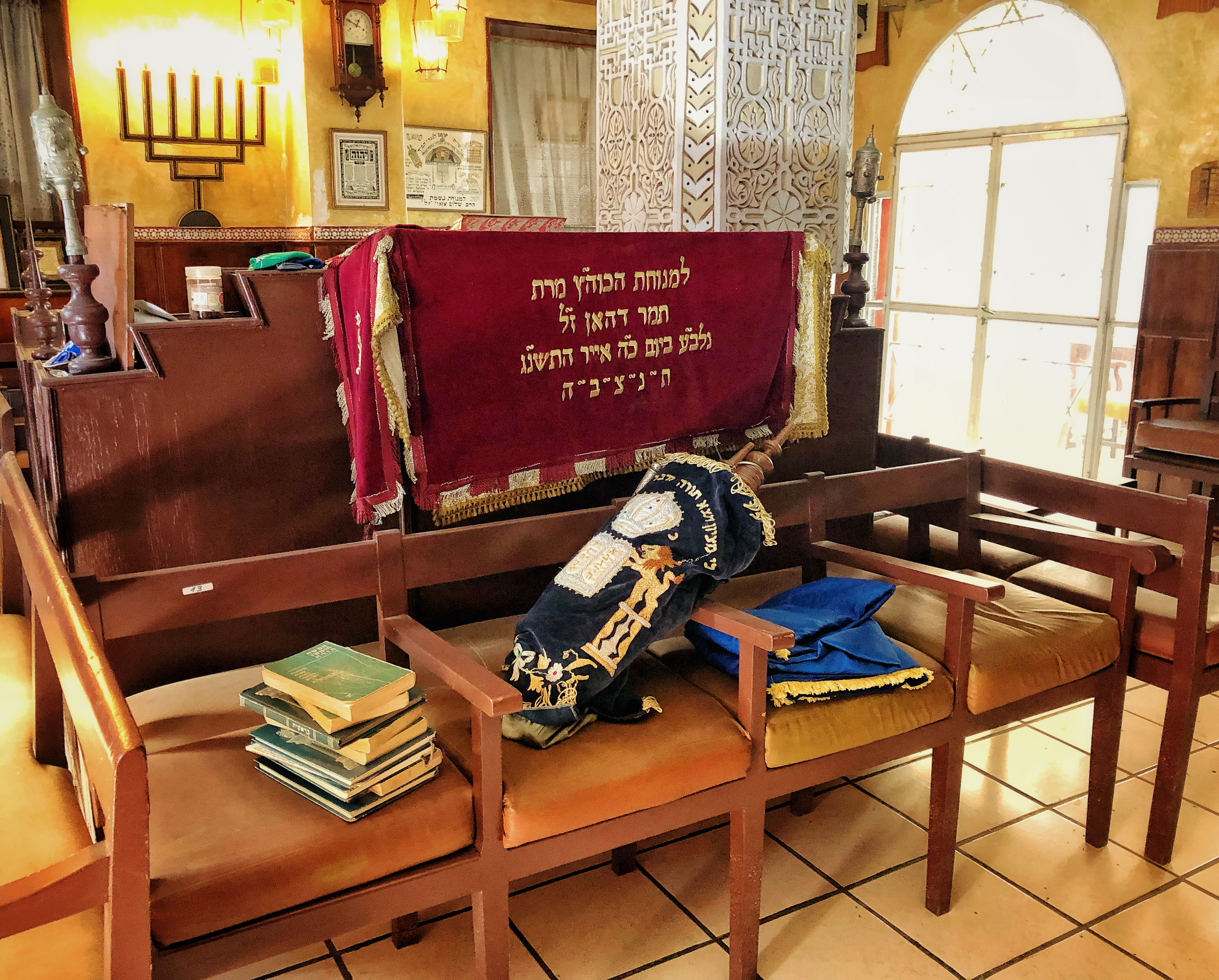
- The synagogue interior, in 2010

- Location of the synagogue in Morocco

Religion
- Affiliation: Judaism
- Ecclesiastical or organizational status: Synagogue
- Status: Active

Location
- Location: Rabat
- Country: Morocco
- Interactive map of Rabbi Shalom Zaoui Synagogue
- Coordinates: 34°01′34″N 6°49′40″W

Architecture
- Type: Synagogue architecture

The Rabbi Shalom Zaoui Synagogue (Hebrew: בית הכנסת רבי שלום זאווי; Arabic: كنيس ربي شالوم الزاوي) is a synagogue located in the Mellah (Jewish quarter) of the medina of Rabat, Morocco.

The synagogue is located near Bab Diouana and contiguous to the Andalusian wall of the medina. It was named after Rabbi Shalom Zaoui (born circa 1839 and died circa 1918) who was respected and revered by his community, as it used to be his house.

== Building ==
The synagogue is accessible by a courtyard painted in bright red. It follows the Moorish architectural style that can be identified through the three-lobed shapes on the windows and the lamps similar to the lamps in mosques.

== See also ==
- History of the Jews in Morocco
- List of synagogues in Morocco
