= Slat Lkahal Synagogue =

Synagogue in Essaouira, Morocco

- Hebrew: בית כנסת צלאת לקהל; Arabic: كنيس صلاة القهال
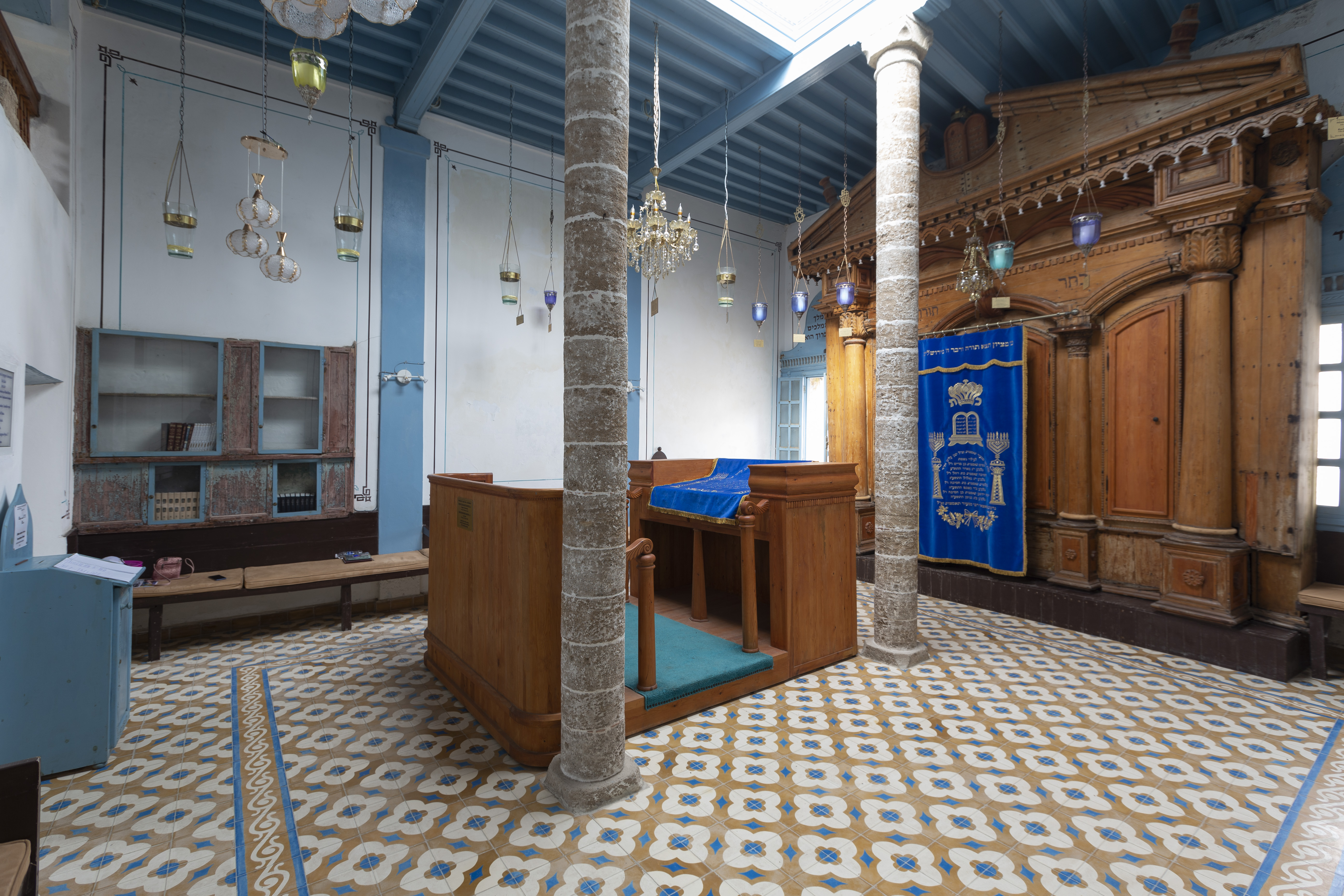
- The synagogue interior, in 2020

- Location of the synagogue in Morocco

Religion
- Affiliation: Judaism
- Ecclesiastical or organisational status: Synagogue
- Status: Active

Location
- Location: Essaouira, Marrakesh-Safi
- Country: Morocco
- Coordinates: 31°30′57″N 9°46′05″W

Architecture
- Type: Synagogue architecture
- Groundbreaking: 1850
- Completed: 1859

The Slat Lkahal Synagogue (Hebrew: בית כנסת צלאת לקהל; Arabic: كنيس صلاة القهال) is a synagogue located in the Mellah (Jewish quarter) of the medina of Essaouira, in Marrakesh-Safi, Morocco.

The synagogue was built from 1850 with funds raised by members of the community who mingled with the crowds at funeral ceremonies and begged for alms, and was inaugurated in 1859.

Paul Bowles recorded "Podhe Adonai Nefech Adadav" and "Chalom lakha yom chebii" by Hazan Semtob Knafo and Amram Castiel as well as other prayers and piyyutim at the Elkahal Synagogue in 1959.

"Slat Lkahal" which means "Synagogue of the Community" is also called the "Synagogue of the Poor". It has also served as a Hebrew learning facility for children.

== See also ==
- History of the Jews in Morocco
- List of synagogues in Morocco
