= Hiloula of Rabbi Haim Pinto =

Anniversary of Moroccan rabbi's death

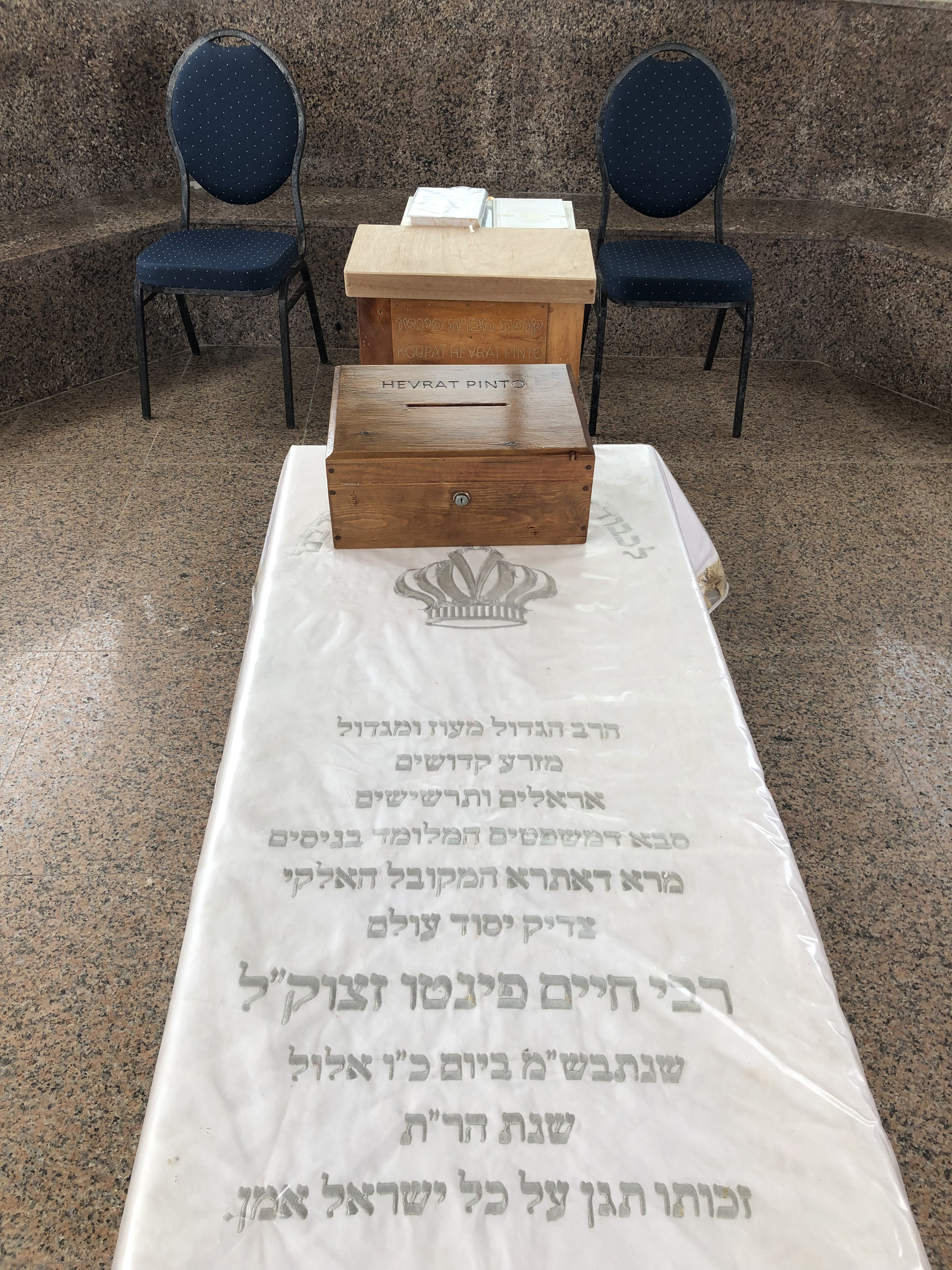
- Tomb of Rabbi Haim Pinto
- Official name: Hiloula of Rabbi Haim Pinto
- Observed by: Jews
- Type: Jewish
- Significance: Commemoration of the anniversary of death of Rabbi Haim Pinto
- Observances: Social gatherings
- Begins: 26 Elul

Hiloula of Rabbi Haïm Pinto is the Yom Hillula, or anniversary of the death of Rabbi Haïm Pinto. It is celebrated in Essaouira, Morocco.

Every year, more than 2000 Jewish pilgrims visit the city for a four-days celebration to commemorate the memory of the Rabbi.

== History ==
Rabbi Haïm Pinto (1743–1845) was the chief rabbi of the city of Essaouira, and part of a distinguished rabbinic family. After his death on 26 Elul of the year 5605 of the Hebrew calendar, his mausoleum, as well as his house became places of pilgrimage and Jews from all over the world come to pray in the family synagogue, and at his grave in the old Jewish cemetery of the city.

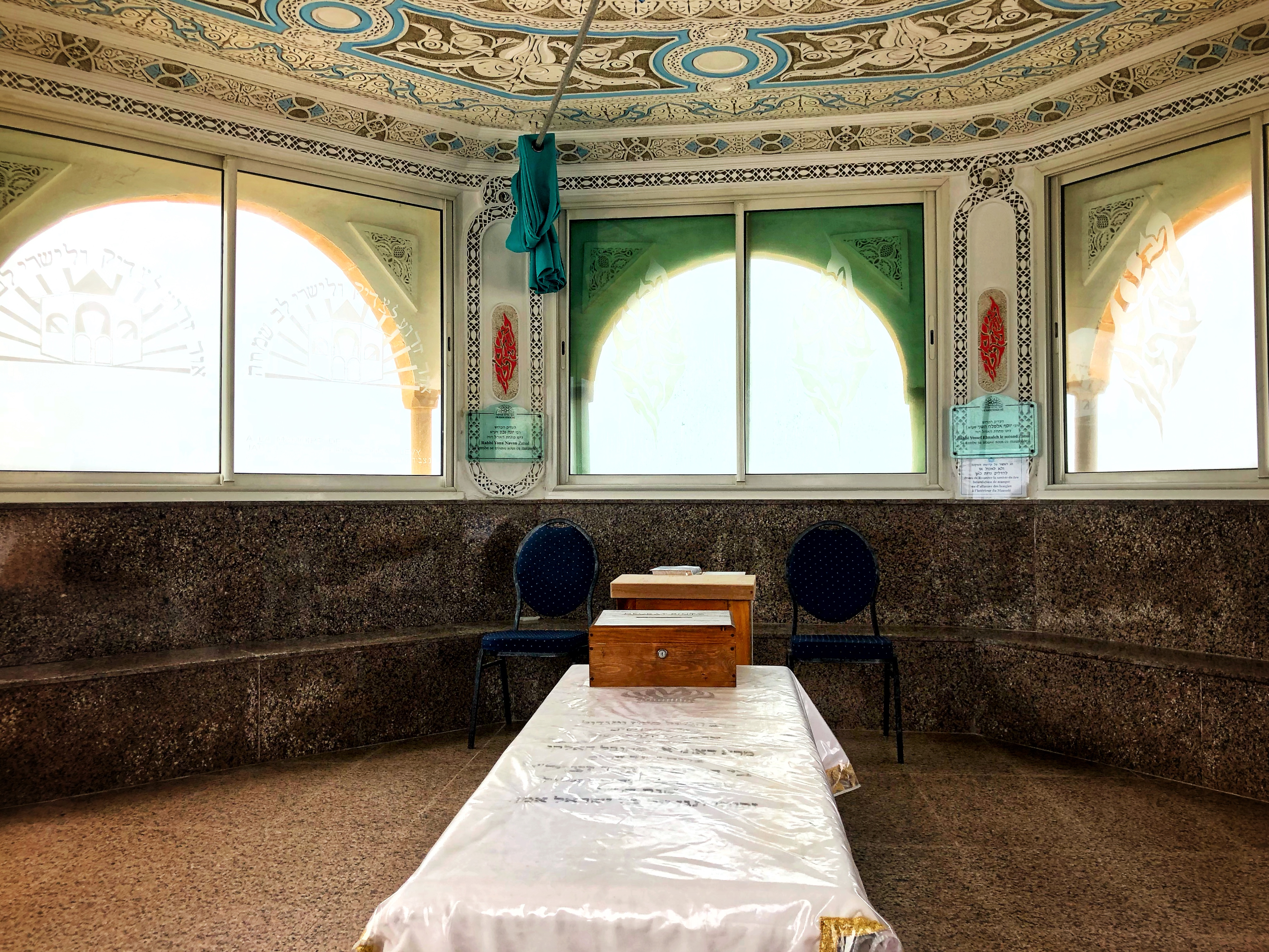
Tomb of Rabbi Haïm Pinto

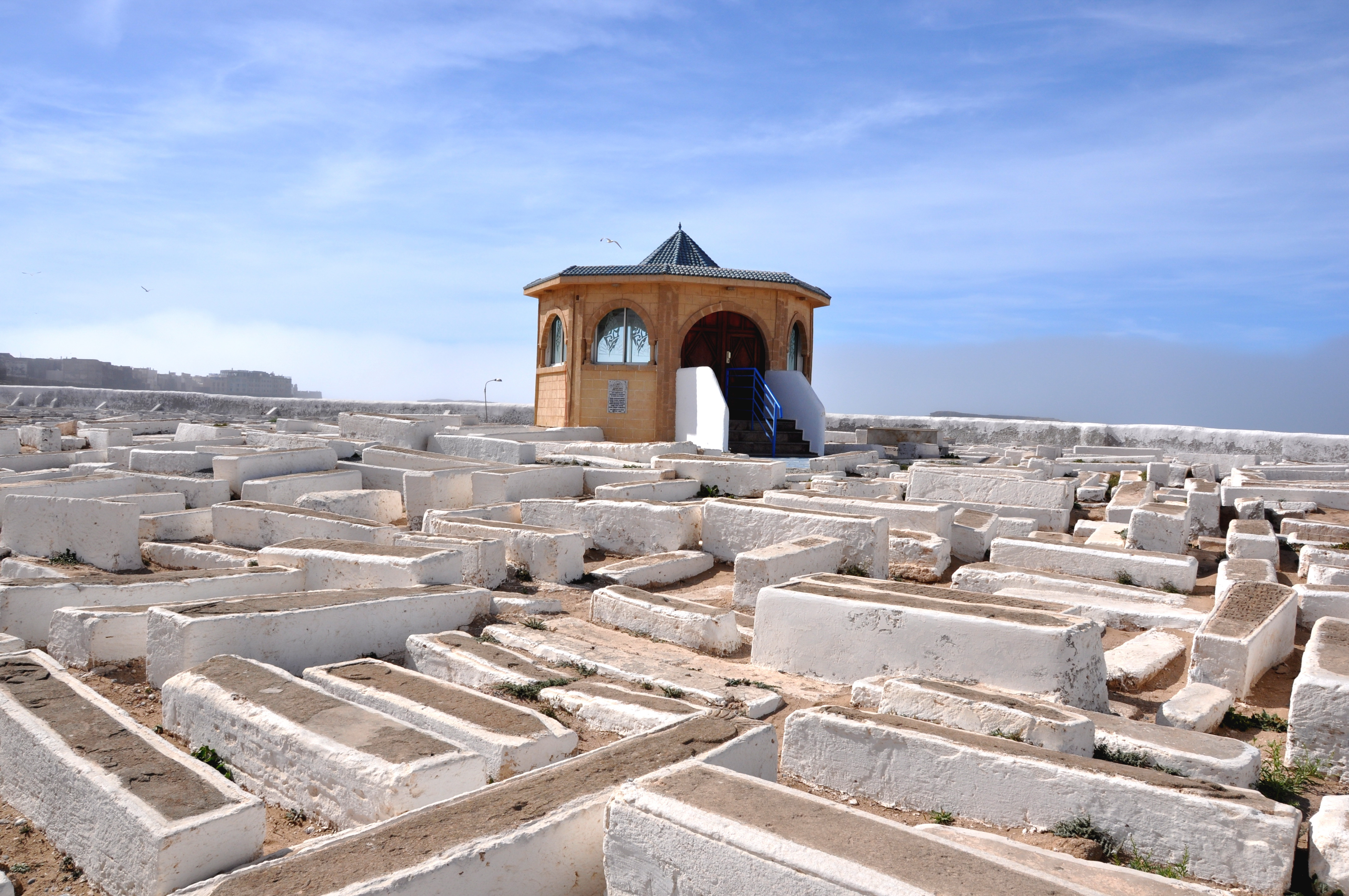
Mausoleum of Rabbi Haïm Pinto

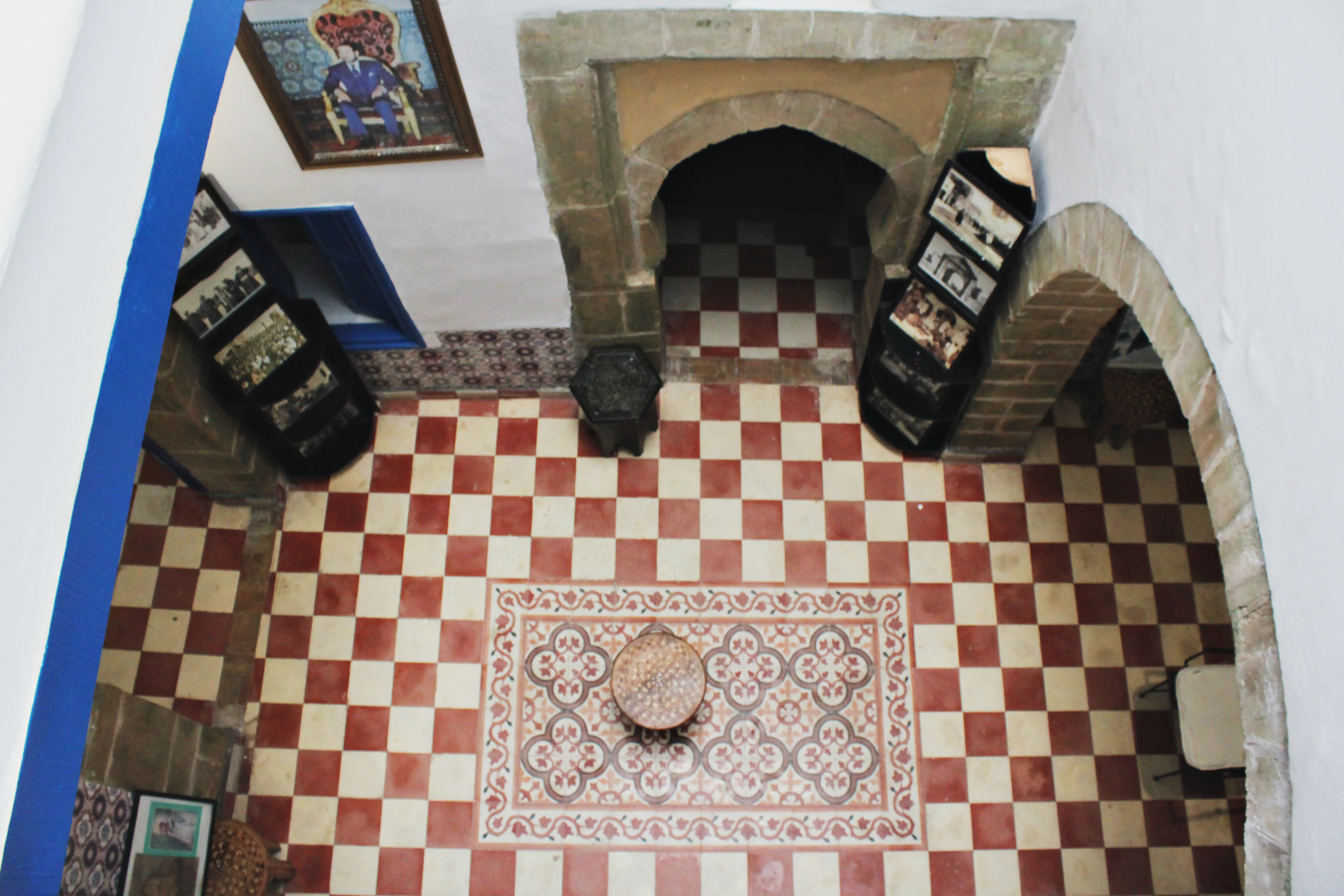
Synagogue of Rabbi Haïm Pinto

== See also ==
- Chaim Pinto
- Chaim Pinto Synagogue
