= Sidi Belyout =

Sidi Belyout سيدي بليوط
- Arrondissement of Casablanca
- Interactive map of Sidi Belyout
- Coordinates: 33°36′02″N 7°38′02″W
- Country: Morocco
- Region: Casablanca-Settat
- Prefecture: Casablanca

Population (2004)
  - Total: 218,918
- Time zone: UTC+0 (GMT)

Sidi Belyout (Arabic: سيدي بليوط) is one of the 16 arrondissements of Casablanca, the largest city in the Casablanca-Settat region of Morocco. As of 2004 it had 218,918 inhabitants.

The name comes from a ḍarīḥ (ضَرِيْح 'mausoleum') dedicated to Sidi Belyout, or Abu al-Liyuth (أبو الليوث 'father of the lions'), regarded as a walī ṣāliḥ (ولي صالح 'saint').

The current President of this district is Kenza Chraibi. (كنزة شرايبي بوهالي)

== District ==
=== Meetings ===
The members of the Sidi Belyout council meet 3 times a year to discuss local matters. They meet during the first week of january, june and september.

These meetings are generally open to the public.

=== Representatives ===
Since the 2021 local elections, the President of the Sidi Belyout arrondissement is Kenza Chraibi (كنزة شرايبي بوهالي).

List of local representatives for Sidi Belyout
| Kenza Chraibi | كنزة شرايبي بوهالي | President of Sidi Belyout |
| Moulay Youssef El Alaoui El Mahmadi | مولاي يوسف العلوي المحمدي | Member of the Council |
| | سناء الجاوي | Member of the Council |
| | رضوان زرندي | Member of the Council |
| | لطيفة مورني | Member of the Council |
| | زكرياء مدركة | Member of the Council |
| | مينة الجنزري | Member of the Council |
| Youssef Boukhechba | يوسف بوخشبة | Member of the Council |
| Redouane Karbani | رضوان الكرباني | Member of the Council |
| | عزيز شبين | Member of the Council |
| Zakia El Alaoui | زكية العلوي | Member of the Council |
| | موسى سراج الدين | Member of the Council |
| Fatima Agoumi | فاطمة اكومي | Member of the Council |
| | محمد فارح | Member of the Council |
| Said Naciri | سعيد الناصري | Member of the Council |
| | ناصر كرطومي | Member of the Council |
| | غزلان زهيري | Member of the Council |
| | عبد الحق الناجحي | Member of the Council |
| | نجية بلكحل | Member of the Council |
| | جهاد سلمات | Member of the Council |
| | أسية ايت محرابي | Member of the Council |
| | عبد الواحد ملياني | Member of the Council |
| | ايات كرداش | Member of the Council |
| | فؤاد رويس | Member of the Council |
| | عمر نارس | Member of the Council |
| | وفاء بنمنصور حسني | Member of the Council |
| | جواد رسام | Member of the Council |
| | لعلى محسن | Member of the Council |
| | سعيد الصبيطي | Member of the Council |
| | عبدالصمد ثابت | Member of the Council |
