= Stoke, Suffolk =

Area of Ipswich, Suffolk, England

Coordinates: 52.04840°N 1.15451°E

Stoke
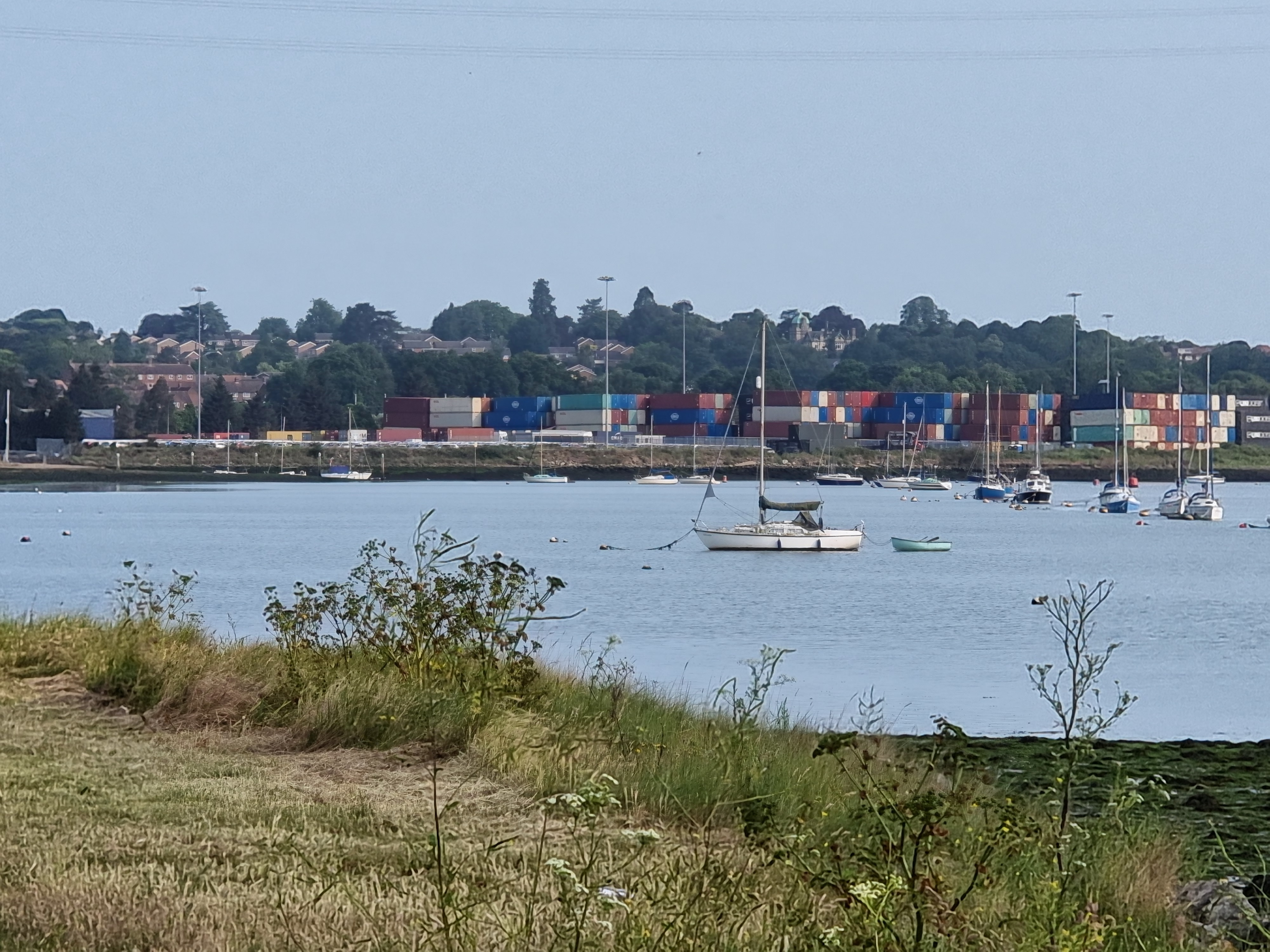
- Oak Hill area, viewed from the Strand, Wherstead

- Location within Suffolk
- District: Ipswich
- Shire county: Suffolk
- Region: East
- Country: England
- Sovereign state: United Kingdom

Stoke is a residential and commercial area in the south west of the town of Ipswich, Suffolk.

== Location ==
Stoke lies to the south west of Ipswich town centre. The longest populated area, just over the river from the town centre, is called Over Stoke.

Stoke is full of suburban housing estates, including Maidenhall, Stoke Park, Chantry, Belstead Hills, and part of Pinewood.

Its ancient boundaries were the River Gipping to the north, which becomes the River Orwell to the east. The area extended south to Belstead Brook, and west to the London Road (A1214).

== Administration ==
For administrative and electoral purposes, the area next to Stoke Bridge, is Bridge Ward. The area near Bourne Bridge is Stoke Park Ward.

== Geography ==
Where the River Orwell swells out over mud to form a lagoon, a western ridge runs parallel for over a mile. It is 164 feet above sea level at its highest point, the highest point in Ipswich. Where the ridge meets the river, close to the town centre, it drops steeply and the river narrows to ordinary dimensions and is renamed as the River Gipping.

Stoke Hills offers a panoramic view of Stoke.

== Amenities ==
Near Stoke Bridge, Grade I listed Anglican church St Mary at Stoke is on Stoke Street, which leads into Belstead Road. There is a Co-op and adjacent parade of shops and food outlets. On New Cut is the Steamboat Tavern.

In the Maidenhall Estate are Hillside Primary School, Stoke High School with Stoke Library, a nursery and a parade of shops, then Stoke Green Baptist Church.

Just up the hill, Halifax Primary School serves the Stoke Park area, which has ASDA supermarket, Bourne Park and Anglican church St Peter's Stoke Park. Farther west are primary schools The Willows and Gusford, and a Special School StoneLodge Academy.

Independent school St Jo's property includes Birkfield House and The Goldrood, and formerly, Oak Hill.

To the south are Belstead Brook Hotel and nature reserves, including Bourne Park Reed Beds. Close to Bourne Bridge are Bourne Garden Centre and Orwell Yacht Club, as well as the ABP West Bank Terminal.

There are several social clubs and a community garden.

== History ==
Stoke was a small hamlet by the river, which rapidly expanded with the coming of the railway and industrialisation in the Victorian Era.

Over the water too, past the dirty ancient suburb a small town of cottages has been built. One former resident remembers Over Stoke being referred to as "The Garden of Eden". In July 1987, part of Stoke became a conservation area.

Adjacent to the small agricultural community was estate land bordering the Orwell used for shooting. Stoke is derived from the Saxon, meaning "the stoke" or stockade; a fortified place. Stoke was placed in the hundred of Ipswich in 1086 in the Domesday Book as one of 470 places under the control of the Abbey of Ely St Etheldreda. Stoke used to be known for its mills. One is mentioned in the Domesday Book. The last was removed late in the 19th century. John Constable painted A Windmill at Stoke in 1814.

One very old house is Gippeswyk Hall. It was once known as "New Place" (New Palace). By tradition, the wife of King Edward (Confessor) lived here when she could be spared from Court. She received a grant of 2/3 of the revenues due to the king because Ipswich was a royal burgh. The Domesday Book records that the Queen had a grange here. The house was restored by Lord Gwydyr, when they found an inscription on a very ancient wall; He that sitteth down to meat and letteth grace pass, sitteth down like an ox and riseth like an ass. It was hired by an apothecary in 1766, who used it as a residential clinic for inoculation against smallpox.

A wooden bridge crossed from Stoke to the town, probably from pre-medieval times. In 1477, it was ordered that carts should not cross the bridge. There was once a ford, probably between Whip Street and St. Peter's dock. The residents of Stoke were sometimes (e.g. 1776) troubled by livestock, driven through from the Samford Hundred on their way to town, which were allowed into their fields to feed. The Bailiffs of Ipswich used to patrol from the Bull Stake on Corn Hill to the middle arch of Bourne Bridge (which had 7 arches in all).

In 1695, the population of the parish was 357 of which 2/3 were male (232 males and 125 females), when the total population of Ipswich was 12,371. Then, the parish included an area on the other bank of the Orwell/Gipping, covering Russell Road and Portmans Walk. In 1801 the population was still only 385, while the total for Ipswich had dropped to 10,043, but climbed steadily, to 992 in 1841. In 1831 there were 127 houses, occupied by 158 families. There were now more females (421) than males (368).

Nathaniel Turner died 15 June 1791 at Stoke Hall, which can be seen top right of a painting of Stoke Bridge by Isaac Sheppard. Stoke Hall was then indentured to P.R.Burrell. In 1864, Burrell gave a 99 year lease of land abutting Willoughby Road to Henry Taylor of Ipswich, builder. The Burrells lived at Stoke Park, which had shooting over 1200 acres, ornamental timber and three lodges. The first Lord Gwydyr received his baronetcy in 1766. He was Governor of the Bank of England and MP for Marlow and later Grampound. The title passed to the Hon. Willoughby Burrell, and from him to John Percy Burrell.

In 1846 the Eastern Union Railway company joined Ipswich to Colchester with a 5 ft gauge line. Three years later the link to Norwich was finished. The original Ipswich station was at Croft Street, Stoke, until 1 July 1860, when the tunnel was opened. The line was taken over by the Great Eastern Railway. Terraces of houses were built in Stoke for the people who ran the railway. The population doubled in ten years, to 2055 in 1851, and continued to increase, rising to 4096 in 1891. The Ipswich Union recorded the parish as 1446 acres in 1883, and 1819 acres in 1891.

The Ordnance Survey map of 1885 shows Belstead Road, Stone Lodge Lane and Birkfield Lane. Along Belstead Road there were several substantial houses; Highland House, Fern Villas, High View, Oakhill, Broadwater House, Orwell Lodge, Stoke House, Mansards. Towards the west, there were Goldrood and Birkfield Lodge, to the south, Maiden Hall and Stoke Park. Alongside the Orwell was Nova Scotia, once a shipyard, the residence of the naval Gower family. Stoke Hall was built next to the church in the 18th Century by a famous wine merchant, Thomas Cartwright, and had extensive vaults able to hold 1,500 pipes of wine. It had its own gate to the church, which lay behind the parish workhouse. The parish workhouse became a school, about 1861, despite the misgivings of those who questioned whether it should be turned over to secular use.

In 1885, between Luther Road and Belstead Road there was a brick works and kiln, and an old windmill, and on Austin Street a vicarage. Ransomes and Rapier had a big engineering works by the Orwell, making railway plant. Robert Charles Ransome was leader of the town's Liberals. The "Waterside Works" had its own tramway in 1885.

The Ordnance Survey map of 1905 shows not only the parish church of St Mary, overlooking the town, but also Stoke Green Chapel (Particular Baptist) opposite Station Street, and a Mission Church opposite Cowell Street. Life near the docks may have been a bit smelly, as there was a manure works on Griffin Wharf, as well as the sewage pumping station on the north bank of the river. There were saw pits in Bath Street, and an Ipswich Union Workhouse in Great Whip Street. Farther south along the river bank, stood Halifax Works (corn and coprolite) and a Tar Works. Up to the 1950s a ferry ran from New Cut East to Bath Street.

In 1924, there were allotments by the railway which are still used today. Between 1928 and 1938, the Holywells estate was built opposite Stoke. On the map of 1938, Hillside School and Belstead Avenue are visible. By 1958, the house of Maiden Hall had gone, to be replaced by the council estate (Glamorgan, Cardiff, Swansea, Tenby, Montgomery Road, Conway and Flint Close, and Maidenhall Approach), and the area by the railway had become Halifax sports pavilion and sports ground. There was a house called Broomhayes close to Home Farm. By 1973, Birkfield Lodge had become a college and chapel. The first stage of the Stoke Park housing estates had been built, including Prince of Wales Drive and Lanercost Way. Stoke Park Drive petered out well short of the Fishpond Covert next to Bourne Park.

In the early 1980's the "hayes" estate was built on the grounds of what had been Orwell Lodge, in the steep area between "Over Stoke" and Stoke Park. Hayes is an old word for meadows. The landscape and urban Suffolk inspired Frederick Forsyth to write his spy thriller The Fourth Protocol, ending with a gang of terrorists holed up in a house in the mythical Cherryhayes. The film of the book features helicopters chasing between the pillars of the Orwell Bridge.

Until 2007, The Old Bell was the oldest working pub in Ipswich.

== Archaeology ==
Fossils were found when the railway tunnel was dug. The Stoke Tunnel Cutting site is preserved. Dating from the Middle Saxon period, an Ipswich Ware pottery kiln was excavated south of the river in Stoke, and a Christian burial ground on Philip Road. On Stoke Quay, 20 Saxon burials, including seven under barrows, were found, dating from the late 6th to early eighth century, also the medieval remains of St Augustine's church with burials of people of several nations. Pottery found in the allotments at Maidenhall may indicate a small medieval hamlet or farm in Stoke.
