= Withersdale =

Village in Suffolk, England

Coordinates: 52.377106°N 1.3542044°E

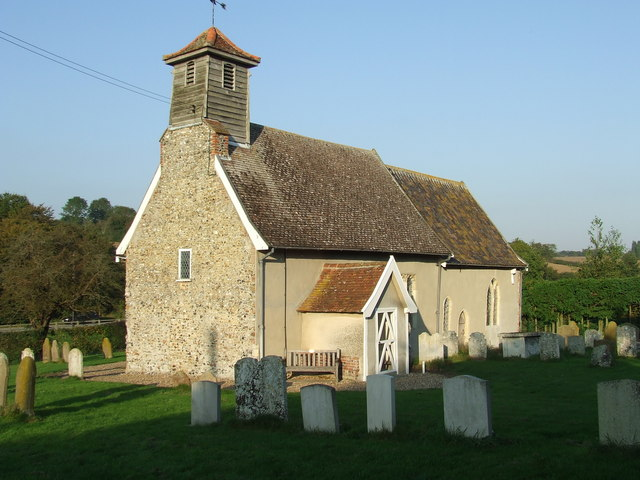

- Location within Suffolk
- Civil parish: Mendham
- District: Mid Suffolk
- Shire county: Suffolk
- Region: East
- Country: England
- Sovereign state: United Kingdom
- Police: Suffolk
- Fire: Suffolk
- Ambulance: East of England

Withersdale is a village in the civil parish of Mendham, in the Mid Suffolk district, in the county of Suffolk, England. In 1881 the parish had a population of 158. Withersdale has a church called St Mary Magdalene.

== History ==
The name "Withersdale" means 'Wether valley' or possibly 'Vithar's valley'. Witherdale was recorded in the Domesday Book as Weresdel. Withersdale was in the Hoxne hundred. On 25 March 1885 the parish was abolished and merged with Metfield, Mendham and Linstead Parva.

== See also ==
- Withersdale Street
