= Copdock and Washbrook =

Civil parish in England

Coordinates: 52.029°N 1.069°E

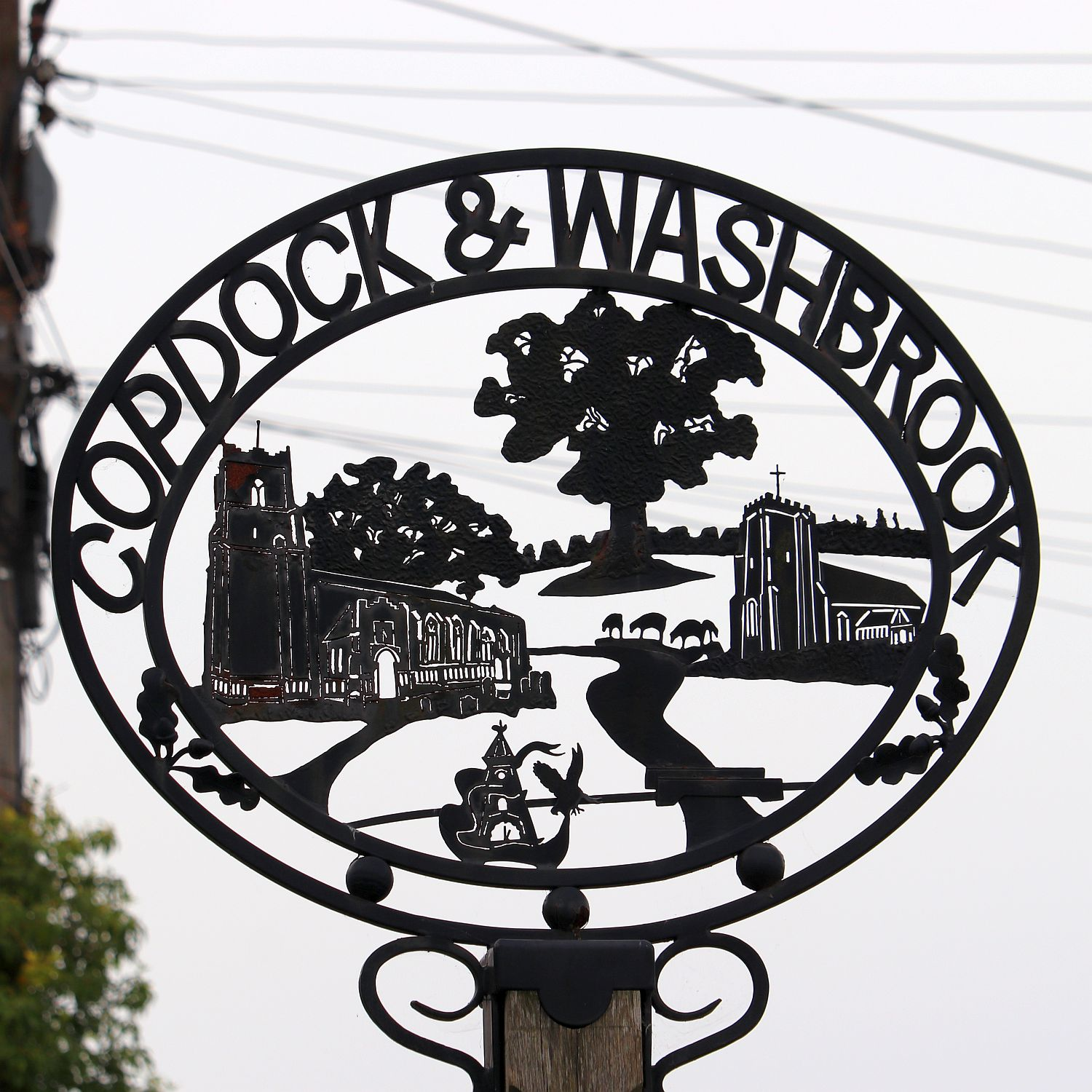
Copdock and Washbrook village sign

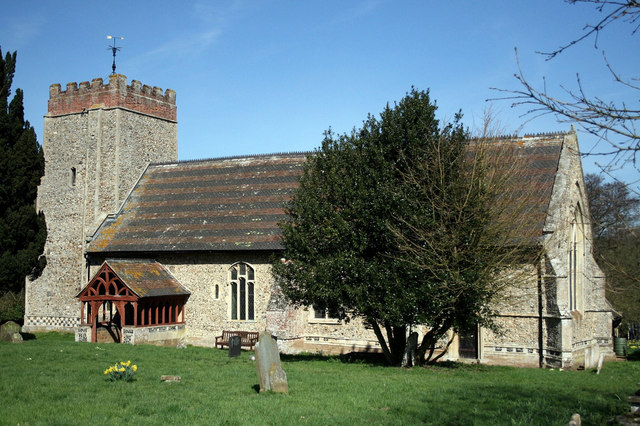
St Mary's Church, Washbrook

Copdock and Washbrook is a civil parish in the Babergh district in the county of Suffolk, England. It covers the villages of Copdock and Washbrook, as well as the hamlets of Coles Green, Mace Green and Washbrook Street.

In 2006 the parish had an estimated population of 1,130. The population was measured at 1,114 in the 2011 Census. It is in the Belstead Brook electoral division of Suffolk County Council.

== Geography ==
The parish was formed in 1994 by a merger of the individual parishes of Copdock and Washbrook. However Washbrook lost some of its north-eastern land area to Sproughton and Pinewood, whilst Copdock's eastern boundary with Belstead was redrawn to match the new route of the A12.

The A12 previously ran through both Copdock and Washbrook, but the villages were bypassed when the A12-A14 Copdock interchange was built. The old A12 is now a C road (the C475), with the new A12 marking the parish's eastern boundary with Belstead and Bentley.
