= Listed buildings in Belstead =

Civil Parish in Suffolk, England

Belstead is a village and civil parish in the Babergh District of Suffolk, England. It contains 16 listed buildings that are recorded in the National Heritage List for England. Of these two are grade II* and 14 are grade II.

This list is based on the information retrieved online from Historic England.

== Key ==
Grade	Criteria
I	Buildings that are of exceptional interest
II*	Particularly important buildings of more than special interest
II	Buildings that are of special interest

== Listing ==
Name	Grade	Location	Type	Completed (Note: The date given is the date used by Historic England as significant for the initial building or that of an important part in the structure's description.)	Date designated	Grid ref. (Note: The grid reference is based on the British national grid reference system, sometimes known as OSGB36, used by the Ordnance Survey.) Geo-coordinates	Notes	Entry number (Note: The "List Entry Number" is a unique number assigned to each listed building and scheduled monument by Historic England.)	Image	Wikidata
Barn at Belstead Hall	II				7 March 1988	TM1270541312; 52°01′46″N 1°05′57″E		1285906	Upload Photo	Q26574563
Belstead Hall	II*		house		22 February 1955	TM1273041246; 52°01′44″N 1°05′59″E		1351648	Belstead Hall More images	Q17534562
Church of St Mary	II*		church building		22 February 1955	TM1265941098; 52°01′39″N 1°05′54″E		1194048	Church of St Mary More images	Q17533905
Blacksmiths Shop	II	Blacksmith's Corner			16 March 1972	TM1310440627; 52°01′23″N 1°06′17″E		1036929	Upload Photo	Q26288603
38 and 38a, Blacksmiths Corner	II	38 and 38a, Blacksmiths Corner			7 March 1988	TM1312040592; 52°01′22″N 1°06′17″E		1285846	Upload Photo	Q26574507
Horsestock	II	Blacksmiths Corner			16 March 1972	TM1309140628; 52°01′23″N 1°06′16″E		1351649	Upload Photo	Q26634731
The Round House	II	10, Chapel Lane			21 September 1972	TM1329941246; 52°01′43″N 1°06′28″E		1036930	Upload Photo	Q26288604
21 and 22, Chapel Lane	II	21 and 22, Chapel Lane			7 March 1988	TM1322841215; 52°01′42″N 1°06′25″E		1285821	Upload Photo	Q26574483
25 and 26, Chapel Lane	II	25 and 26, Chapel Lane			7 March 1988	TM1317241188; 52°01′41″N 1°06′22″E		1351650	Upload Photo	Q26634732
27 and 28, Chapel Lane	II	27 and 28, Chapel Lane			7 March 1988	TM1316241193; 52°01′41″N 1°06′21″E		1194186	Upload Photo	Q26488817
29 and 30, Chapel Lane	II	29 and 30, Chapel Lane			7 March 1988	TM1309841162; 52°01′40″N 1°06′18″E		1036931	Upload Photo	Q26288605
31 and 32, Chapel Lane	II	31 and 32, Chapel Lane			7 March 1988	TM1311641002; 52°01′35″N 1°06′18″E		1194200	Upload Photo	Q26488830
Charity Farmhouse	II	Charity Lane			7 March 1988	TM1228040419; 52°01′18″N 1°05′33″E		1036932	Upload Photo	Q26288606
Crope Hall	II	Charity Lane			7 March 1988	TM1242640518; 52°01′21″N 1°05′41″E		1194206	Upload Photo	Q26488836
4 and 5, Holly Lane	II	4 and 5, Holly Lane			7 March 1988	TM1332641577; 52°01′54″N 1°06′30″E		1351651	Upload Photo	Q26634733
Belstead War Memorial	II	Junction Of Chapel Lane And Grove Hill, IP8 3LP	war memorial		2 February 2018	TM1314041032; 52°01′36″N 1°06′20″E		1452387	Belstead War Memorial More images	Q66479264

== See also ==
- Grade I listed buildings in Suffolk
- Grade II* listed buildings in Suffolk

== Sources ==
- Bettely, James; Pevsner, Nikolaus (2015) [1961], Suffolk: West, The Buildings of England, New Haven and London: Yale University Press, ISBN 978-0-300-19655-9
