= Listed buildings in Copdock and Washbrook =

Civil Parish in Suffolk, England

Copdock and Washbrook is a village and civil parish in the Babergh District of Suffolk, England. It contains 24 listed buildings that are recorded in the National Heritage List for England. Of these two are grade II* and 22 are grade II.

This list is based on the information retrieved online from Historic England.

== Key ==
Grade	Criteria
I	Buildings that are of exceptional interest
II*	Particularly important buildings of more than special interest
II	Buildings that are of special interest

== Listing ==
Name	Grade	Location	Type	Completed (Note: The date given is the date used by Historic England as significant for the initial building or that of an important part in the structure's description.)	Date designated	Grid ref. (Note: The grid reference is based on the British national grid reference system, sometimes known as OSGB36, used by the Ordnance Survey.) Geo-coordinates	Notes	Entry number (Note: The "List Entry Number" is a unique number assigned to each listed building and scheduled monument by Historic England.)	Image	Wikidata
Chelmesis Gainsborough Inglenook	II	Back Lane			7 March 1988	TM1161841980; 52°02′09″N 1°05′02″E		1194377	Upload Photo	Q26489003
Cherry Cottage Cherry Orchard	II	Back Lane			7 March 1988	TM1159841976; 52°02′09″N 1°05′01″E		1351636	Upload Photo	Q26634720
Coles Green Farmhouse	II	Chattisham Road			7 March 1988	TM0994241772; 52°02′05″N 1°03′34″E		1285727	Upload Photo	Q26574394
The Orchards	II	Chattisham Road			7 March 1988	TM1007841608; 52°01′59″N 1°03′40″E		1036894	Upload Photo	Q26288570
Church of St Mary	II*	Church Lane	church building		22 February 1955	TM1095342589; 52°02′30″N 1°04′28″E		1194408	Church of St Mary More images	Q7594449
Tudor Cottage	II	Elm Lane			7 March 1988	TM1124241543; 52°01′55″N 1°04′41″E		1036933	Upload Photo	Q26288607
Fen Farmhouse	II	Hollow Lane			7 March 1988	TM1100942078; 52°02′13″N 1°04′30″E		1036895	Upload Photo	Q26288571
Barns at Redhouse Farm	II	London Road			7 March 1988	TM1097340100; 52°01′09″N 1°04′24″E		1285790	Upload Photo	Q26574454
Belldown	II	London Road			22 February 1955	TM1153341443; 52°01′52″N 1°04′56″E		1194246	Upload Photo	Q26488874
Copdock Lodge	II	London Road			22 February 1955	TM1143241262; 52°01′46″N 1°04′51″E		1036890	Upload Photo	Q26288566
Redhouse Farmhouse	II	London Road			22 February 1955	TM1095840145; 52°01′11″N 1°04′23″E		1351634	Upload Photo	Q26634718
Woodsend and No 1 Woodsend	II	London Road			22 February 1955	TM1075739788; 52°00′59″N 1°04′12″E		1036891	Upload Photo	Q26288567
Copdock Mill	II	Mill Lane			22 February 1955	TM1221341954; 52°02′07″N 1°05′33″E		1285761	Upload Photo	Q26574425
Mill House	II	Mill Lane			22 February 1955	TM1222741925; 52°02′06″N 1°05′34″E		1036892	Upload Photo	Q26288568
Barn at Copdock Hall	II	Pound Lane			22 February 1955	TM1192541576; 52°01′55″N 1°05′17″E		1351635	Upload Photo	Q26634719
Church of St Peter	II*	Pound Lane	church building		22 February 1955	TM1202641531; 52°01′54″N 1°05′22″E		1194324	Church of St Peter More images	Q17533964
Felcourt	II	The Avenue			7 March 1988	TM1171541104; 52°01′41″N 1°05′05″E		1194223	Upload Photo	Q26488854
Amor Hall	II	The Street			22 February 1955	TM1162342372; 52°02′22″N 1°05′03″E		1194446	Upload Photo	Q26489072
Chaloners Cottage	II	The Street			7 March 1988	TM1178742141; 52°02′14″N 1°05′11″E		1036896	Upload Photo	Q26288572
Huntley House	II	The Street			7 March 1988	TM1172642044; 52°02′11″N 1°05′08″E		1285748	Upload Photo	Q26574412
Rosemary Cottage and Hillside	II	The Street			7 March 1988	TM1176042020; 52°02′10″N 1°05′09″E		1036893	Upload Photo	Q26288569
Dakons	II	Washbrook Street			7 March 1988	TM1109342856; 52°02′38″N 1°04′36″E		1036897	Upload Photo	Q26288573
The Grange	II	Washbrook Street			22 February 1955	TM1124442920; 52°02′40″N 1°04′44″E		1194480	Upload Photo	Q26489105
Birch House Farmhouse	II	Wenham Road			7 March 1988	TM0830441051; 52°01′43″N 1°02′06″E		1036898	Upload Photo	Q26288574

== See also ==
- Grade I listed buildings in Suffolk
- Grade II* listed buildings in Suffolk

== Sources ==
- Bettely, James; Pevsner, Nikolaus (2015) [1961], Suffolk: West, The Buildings of England, New Haven and London: Yale University Press, ISBN 978-0-300-19655-9
