= Belstead Brook Hotel =

Country house hotel in Suffolk, England

Coordinates: 52°2′7.4″N 1°7′24.4″E

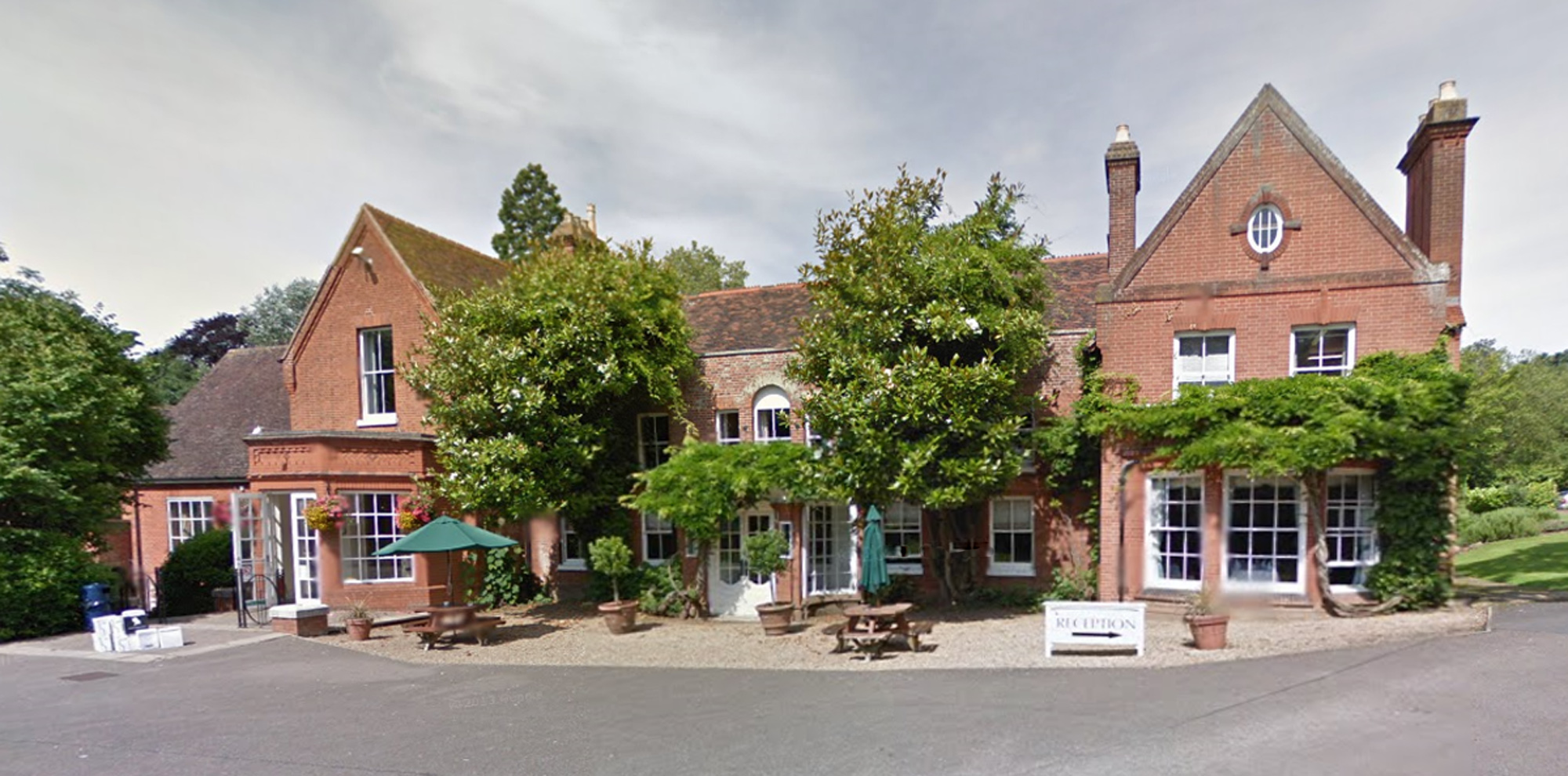
Belstead Brook Hotel

The Belstead Brook Hotel in Ipswich, Suffolk is a building of historical significance. It was originally a 16th-century hunting lodge but was used later as a family residence. The property was then converted to a hotel which now provides accommodation and restaurant facilities. It also caters for special events particularly weddings.

The Cinema Museum in London holds home movie footage of the Hotel in about 1962.

== Nineteenth-century residents ==
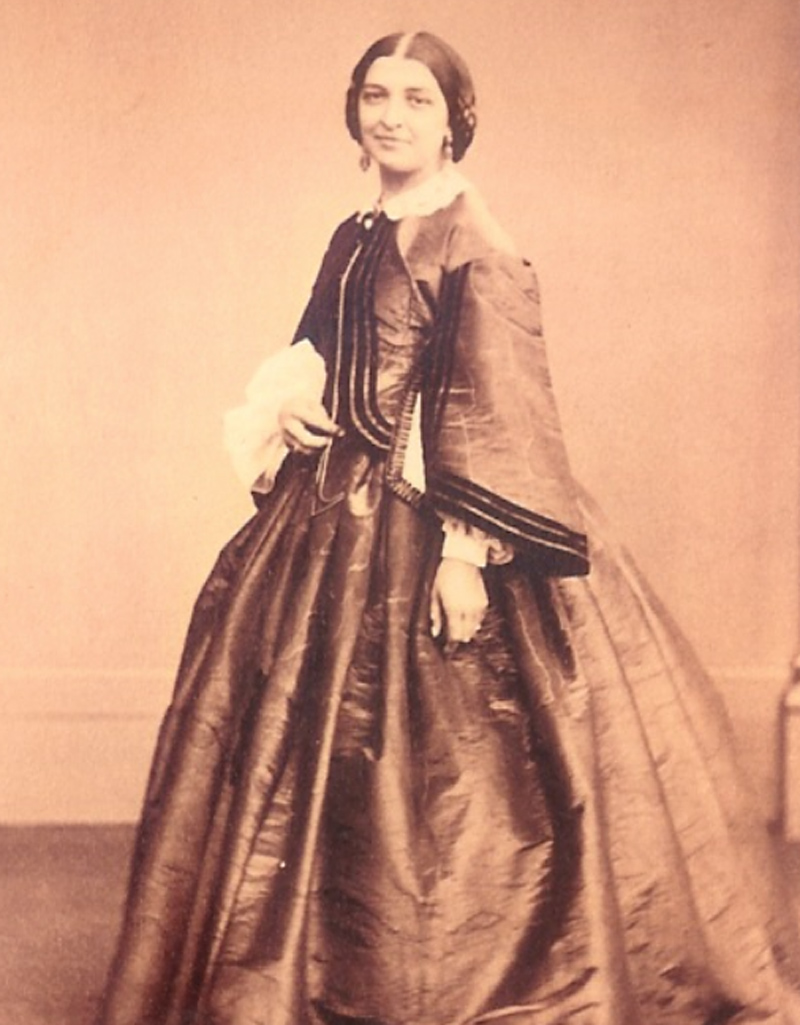
Marian Vink

Belstead Brook Hotel was called Belstead Lodge during the 19th century. Some of the residents were Robert Pretyman and his wife Mary (née Suggate) who owned the house until 1821. It was then the home of the Collins family.

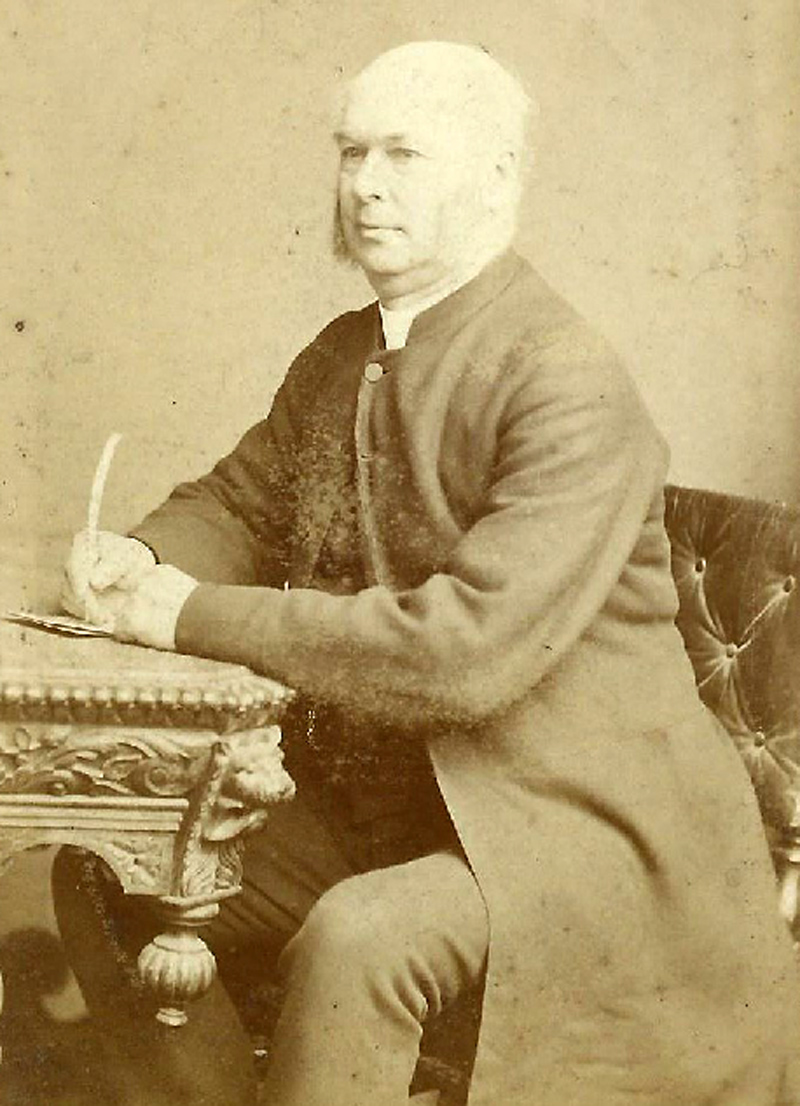
Reverend John Brewster Meadows

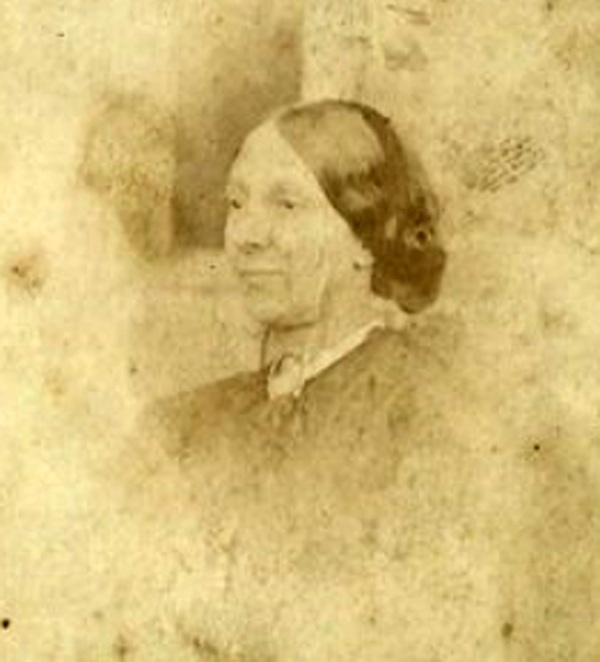
Rose Meadows

In 1831 John Josselyn (1802–1869) and his new bride Emily moved into the house and remained there for about 15 years. John was part of the Josselyn family who owned Belstead Hall, which is not far from this property. After this family left, Charles Deane and his new wife Catherine Pytches lived there for a few years.

In the 1850s Peter and Marian Vink became residents of the house. Peter (Petrus) Vink was born in 1824 in London. His father came from Belgium and settled in England in the early 1820s. Peter became an iron merchant and had a business in Ipswich. He died in 1863 at the age of only 40, leaving Marian a widow with two young children.

Marian was born in 1831 in Wetheringsett, Suffolk. Her father was Henry Woodward, a prosperous farmer. When Peter died she remained at Belstead Lodge for some time, and then in 1867 she married Henry Waspe, who was the owner of the nearby property called Gusford Hall. She lived at Gusford Hall for the rest of her life at died there aged 93.

The Reverend John Brewster Meadows and his wife Rose were the next residents. He lived there from 1866 until 1879 when he was the clergyman for Copdock and Washbrook. John Meadows was born in 1813 in Witnesham, Suffolk. His father was the Reverend Philip Meadows. His grandfather owned Witnesham Hall. He was educated at Cambridge University and became a deacon at the age of 24. His wife Rose was born in Ufford, Suffolk in 1822. Her father was Samuel Armstrong, a surgeon in Melton. The couple was married in 1844 and had four daughters.

== Willoughby Merrik Campbell Burrell, 5th Baron Gywdyr ==
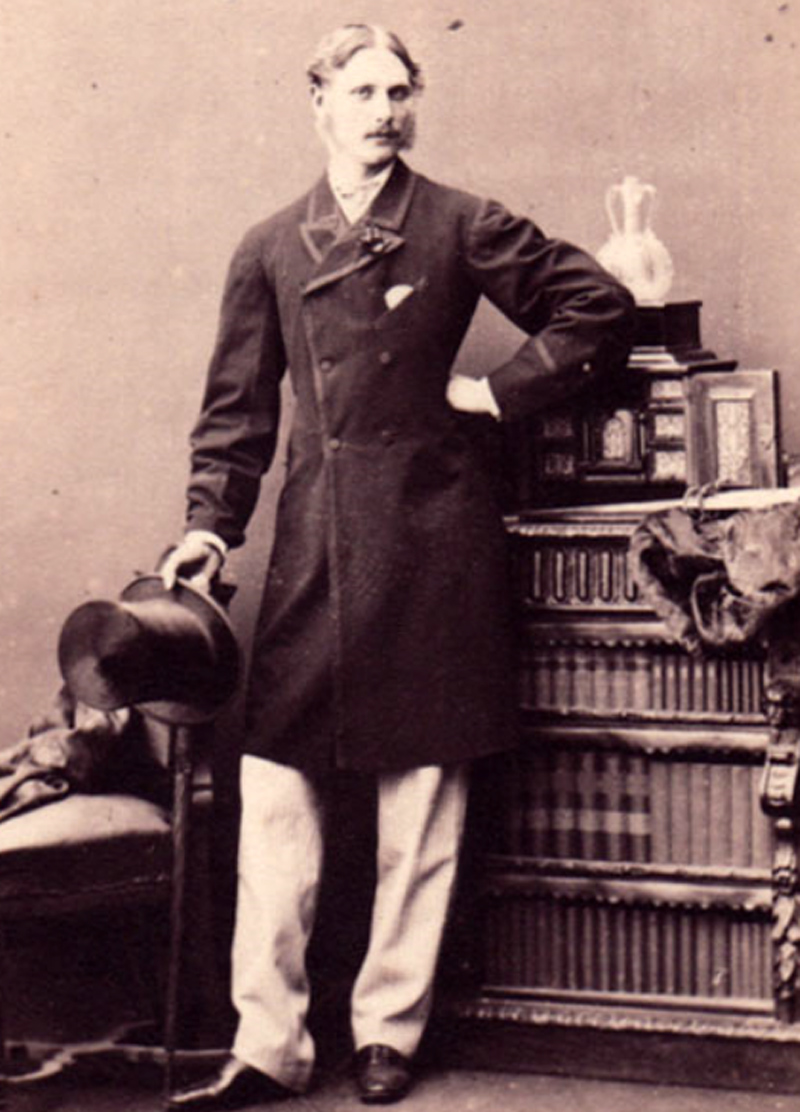
Willoughby Burrell

Willoughby Burrell (Lord Gywdyr) and his wife Mary came to Belstead Lodge in about 1879. Willoughby was born in 1841 in Ipswich. His father was Peter Burrell, 4th Baron Gywdyr who owned Stoke Hall, Ipswich. In 1873 he married Mary Banks who was the daughter of Sir John Banks of Ireland. The couple had three children – one daughter and two sons.

Mary became interested in the life and works of Richard Wagner, the famous composer. She collected letters and memorabilia about his life and wrote several books which are still regarded as valuable references. In 1887 a garden party was held by the Burrells (Lord and Lady Gywdyr) at Belstead Lodge and it was reported in the newspaper as follows.

On Saturday afternoon Belstead Lodge, the present residence of Lord and Lady Gwydyr was the scene of a large and exceedingly pleasant reunion of the leading inhabitants of the town who had been invited to a garden party in the comparatively small but trim and picturesque demesne near Belstead Brook with its beautiful level lawn its umbrageous nooks its rippling rill and sylvan scenery on all sides. Lawn tennis was indulged in by many of the visitors, while others strolled about the path-divided lawn and shrubbery adjacent, partaking meanwhile of the “cup that cheers” iced fruit and many other luxuries which the season affords.

In 1894 the Burrells sold the Lodge.
