= St Mary at Stoke =

Coordinates: 52.050202°N 1.152956°E

St Mary at Stoke, Ipswich
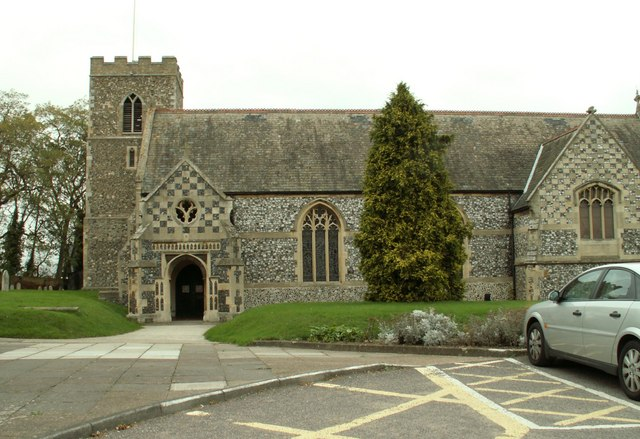
- Saint Mary at Stoke from the front entrance

- Location in Suffolk
- Location: Ipswich, Suffolk
- Country: England
- Denomination: Anglican

Saint Mary at Stoke is a Grade I listed Anglican church in the Over Stoke area of Ipswich.

The church stands in a prominent position at the foot of a ridge near Stoke Bridge and the town centre. Its parish was a small farming community which saw a great increase in population with the coming of the railway to this part of Ipswich.

== Architecture ==
The building is made up of a small medieval church and a large Victorian extension designed by William Butterfield in 1872.

The original nave (now the north aisle) has a medieval single hammer beam roof, with moulded wall plates, angels with shields at the ends of the hammer beams, and figures underneath. The angels are Victorian replacements for those destroyed by iconoclasts. The church was visited by William Dowsing. There is a medieval piscina.

Richard Hall Gower is buried in a vault of the church.

== History ==
A church has existed on this site since the 10th Century. It is likely that it was one of the St Marys mentioned in the Domesday Book. The first church was probably made of wood. It was once governed by Ely, a fact lightly made much of by a politician of Stoke. In 970, King Edgar endowed St. Ethelreda (i.e. the Prior and Convent of Ely) with lands in the parish and moiety of jurisdiction beyond the bridge (3 carnicates, peopled by 9 villans, 5 bordars rising to 15, 1 serf, several plough teams). The ceremony for the donation was an occasion of great solemnity, attended by the Queen and the great churchman Dunstan. It remained the property of the convent until the Dissolution of the monasteries.The church hiring was listed as 40 acres of free land, 1 mill, 20 acres meadow, 12 beasts, 20 hogs, 24 sheep and 14 goats.

There is a tradition which says that churches in this area of Suffolk go by the name of St Mary if they were used by pilgrims on their way to the great shrine at Walsingham, Norfolk. In medieval times, Ipswich had its own shrine of Mary, still marked today by the plaque for the Black Virgin on Lady Lane. In medieval Ipswich there were five Religious Houses, and many of the parish churches were annexed or appropriated to them. Just over the river from Stoke lay the parish of St. Nicholas and the Franciscan Friary dating from 1297. A little farther on, the Priory of St. Peter and St. Paul, a community of Augustinian Canons, had appropriated St. Mary at the Quay and others.

In medieval times, Stoke was known for its gold cross or rood stood, which was reputed to be gifted with miraculous powers. The Gold Rood of Stoke was probably deliberately destroyed by Puritans, but a house was named after it, which stood until the beginning of the twentieth century, near where the water tower now is. In 1547, an edict was given by King Edward that all 'superstitious' objects be removed from the kingdom. During the Revolution, Ipswich had a strong following for Cromwell and the puritan movement. The Parliamentary visitor, William Dowsing, records the desecration of Crosses in Wood, and 2 Cherubim painted; and one Inscription in Brass with `ora pro nobis' on his visit 29–30 January 1643.

Some of the men of the fleet in the Second Dutch War were buried in the churchyard in 1665, from the ships Royal James, Royal Oak, Henry, Lyon, Monck and St Andrew.

The Rectory used to be situated between what is now the entrance to the railway tunnel and Hillside Junior School. It had substantial lands, which provided an income for the Rector. In 1763, the then Rector, Revd. Cuthbert Douthwaite, wrote This parish to a large extent consists chiefly of farmhouses, and is one of the suburbs of Ipswich, containing 60 families. There is one family of note, viz, Nathaniel Turner, Esq. There are no Papists in my parish. There are Presbyterians, and their teachers are Thomas Scott and... Their numbers were decreased lately, some having removed into other parishes, and others conformd to the Church. There are no Quakers in my parish. There are not many who commonly absent themselves from public worship on the Lord's Day, and those of the lowest rank. There are no parish schools or hospital (or almshouses).

April 1782 Revd Mr Baily Wallis was appointed Rector, and he died 30 May 1820, after 36 years service. There is a memorial tablet for him in the church. Some hundred years after his appointment, the parish meeting laughed on noting that in that time there had been 9 parish clerks, 3 of whom had been women! They assumed that the women had to have been the widows of former clerks. 6 August 1811, the vestry purchased a "Burn's Justice" for the use of the parish, but whether it was because of the people's pugilistic tendency or not it does not say. From 1812, the parish clerk was chosen by the Rector.

Service only once a day - in the morning - there was a very small choir - Mr Wasper family at Gusper Hall and Mr Gowers of Nova Scotia were the only people of distinction who regularly attended the service - sometimes Mr Steward of Stoke Park would attend but not often - occasionally when they arrived at Church they were told there would be no service as the parson was not very well, which they took to mean that he had been too convivial on the previous evening. In 1818, when the expenditure of the parish was £84 6s 8d and income £57 3s 4d, a bell was sold for £25 10s 9d to make up the deficit. Some of the Clergy were accustomed, in the case of Christenings, to go to the houses of the principal parishioners and Christian the child at home, but Baily Wallis stuck against that practice and would have the infants christened at church, as he said according to the Rubric.

A sketch made in 1839, by Davy, shows the parish church to be a small building with a low western tower and elaborate brick two-storeyed south porch.It had a plaster-covered nave and chancel continuous under a medieval single hammer-beam roof. In 1824 the ceiling was painted sky-blue and the backboard of the pulpit was lined with blue velvet bordered with broad gold lace. The church probably dated from the late 15th Century, and seated 120. We can still see a medieval piscina in the south east corner. The church was described as being remarkable for being very plain if we do not say ugly. Another commentator noted that the building was chiefly remarkable for its ugliness and for the circumstance that it was the last church in the town, if not in the county, in which instrumental music was still supplied by one or two dashing fiddlers, a wheezy trombone, and a squalling clarinet.

In 1864, nearly twenty years after the population explosion began (when the railway came), the old church was restored, and a small north transept added. Under the direction of Revd Stephen Croft, the seating was increased to nearly 200. P.R.Burrell did much of the design, although R.M.Phipson is also named. The high pews removed from the nave (neat benches substituted), the plaster knocked off the walls, and the hammer beams were adorned with carved angels. The carved angels replaced those defaced by the ill-directed zeal of the Puritans.

In 1868 Revd J.H.Henderson was presented the living. The first ever Curate for the parish was also appointed. Revd. Henderson was an energetic man who soon decided that the church was too small for a parish of nearly 3000 people. He began to stir the matter, well seconded by leading parishioners. There was an appeal for funds, and Lord Gwydyr of Stoke Park headed the list, followed by Miss Lacon and the Rector. The Dean and Chapter of Ely contributed £100.

1870–2, the architect William Butterfield designed a new nave, chancel and south porch, more than doubling the size of the original church, which was left as the north aisle and Lady Chapel. Traditional East Anglian flint and the Perpendicular style of architecture were used, as commonly found in the medieval churches locally.The choir stalls were of Riga wainscot oak, poppy heads richly carved. The large east window glass was donated by Mrs Lacon of the Goldrood, in memory of her husband Capt. Lacon RN. The west window glass was donated by Mr Charles Forte Gower. In February 1872 the church was reopened. In his sermon, the Venerable Archdeacon Emery BC Canon of Ely preached on Romans 12:4-5, and commented that a new organ was needed. In December 1872 a new organ by GM Holdich was opened, although it was still being paid for, and it was observed that it was too pent up in its chamber. The sermon then was on Galatians 6:7.

December 1875 saw the service for the reredos given by Miss Lacon, executed by the Ipswich School of Art. Formerly merely striped with red tile, the stone panels were now filled with full-length figures in oil painting on a gold background in the style of the early Italian school. There were 8 panels; 4 major prophets and 4 evangelists, each with a scroll quoting their words. On the North side, Isaiah, Daniel, St Matthew and St Mark. On the South side, St Luke, St John, Jeremiah and Ezekiel. In the centre were 4 angels and a central cross in white marble on a gold background with a broad border of red, gold and black.

Within 12 months of his appointment as Rector, Revd Canon Bulstrode was considered a front rank preacher in the town. His voice was not strong, and his delivery hurried, but he was admired for the originality and freshness of his thoughts, and his ability to hit out right and left at his congregation. He was considered a Broad Churchman, in sympathy with ornate ritual, but who disfavoured Romish practices and respected the dissenters. There are a number of records of his parish meetings, and review of his sermons, available from the Records Office. At one meeting, they discussed how to get the congregation to sit down promptly at the beginning of the service, comparing their practice against that of St. Peter's, where directly the bell stopped tolling all vacant seats were immediately filled up. They decided that they did the same thing - in which case, said the Rector if that is the custom there is an end to it. His churchwarden Mr Grimsey concluded by saying Those who expect to find their seats unoccupied should come regularly and early for them.

In Victorian times, the Rectory moved to a house on the corner of Willoughby Road, 56 Belstead Road. In 1962 it was considered cold, damp, far too big and it had a huge garden and expensive upkeep costs. By 1976, the Rectory had moved to 8 Belstead Road. In the early 80's another Rectory was built at 74 Ancaster Road.

Robert Bernard Godfrey came as Rector in November 1962, with his wife Joy, to a parish which was run down. Houses were being demolished under clearance schemes, and people were moving out rather than in. The parish had a down-at-heel feel, little changed since the Second World War. "Canon Bob", as he later came to be known, set to work to renovate the buildings and mobilise the people. The Parish church was badly in need of costly maintenance, and was hemmed in by very old and almost derelict buildings; the former Stoke School and one time Workhouse. Within months he questioned the sense of having a great Parish Hall in Luther Road - remote from the Church - and proposed to knock down the old school and build a new hall there. We can't afford things like that! said the Treasurer. Then, two Church Wardens held office at a time; the Rector picked one, the parish chose the other.

Canon Bob managed to persuade a contractor to demolish the old buildings by the church for nothing except the value of those bricks and timbers not used to fill in the vast cellars. By 1965, the Parish Hall and the daughter churches of St Edmund's and St Ethelreda's were sold. The £15,000 so raised paid for a new church hall next to the church, with a flat on top for the Verger, and a car park in front. The hall has been regularly used, not only by the church congregation, but by other groups including the Red Cross and a ballet school.

Not long after, plans were drafted for a vast new housing estate at Stoke Park . With support from the Ganzoni family, Canon Bob got the developers to allocate a site to Stoke Church for community use. It was a pond, near Bourne Park. After the land drainage specialists and pile drivers had done their bit, it was the turn of the Hon. Jill Ganzoni, who laid the dedication foundation stone of St Peter Stoke Park in 1975. Canon Bob organised endless fund raising efforts; not only fetes and bazaars, but a vegetable stall outside the church hall, and the Rector's Shop in Wherstead Road, which sold virtually anything anyone could lay hands on. Canon Bob left the parish in 1976, to take up the living of Sproughton with Burstall. On retirement, he returned as Honorary Assistant Priest, and was a much appreciated `father' to the church. Canon Bob died in October 1995, and many were those who came to St. Mary Stoke to his funeral, in grateful memory of his passion for his Lord and his leadership from the front during those years. November 1995 saw the death of Eddie Griggs, Verger from 1966 until the time of his death. Persuaded by Canon Bob to move to the small flat above the church hall, with his wife Wyn and four children, Eddie was a dedicated and thorough servant of the church. He is irreplaceable.The red and white altar frontal of the Lady Chapel is dedicated in his memory. Arnold Stiff donated a painted plaque, which can be seen on the north wall, to commemorate St Mary at Stoke's long association with the people of the railway. The names and dates of all past and present Rectors and Vicar are on display in the church, with a new board presented in 1996 in memory of the late Treasurer, Mr John Wells.

In the 1980s the Rector was Revd Canon Dennis Yates, and the benefice included St Mary Wherstead. In 1995 the Church Of England subsumed St Mary Stoke and St Peter Stoke Park into the "South West Ipswich Team Ministry" in the Diocese of St Edmundsbury and Ipswich. During the Covid outbreak, the team ministry disbanded and separate parishes were created for each church. St Mary Stoke has the opportunity to focus on the needs of the folk who live on the ridge west of the river.
