= Stoke Bridge =

Bridge in Ipswich, England

Coordinates: 52.051647°N 1.153664°E

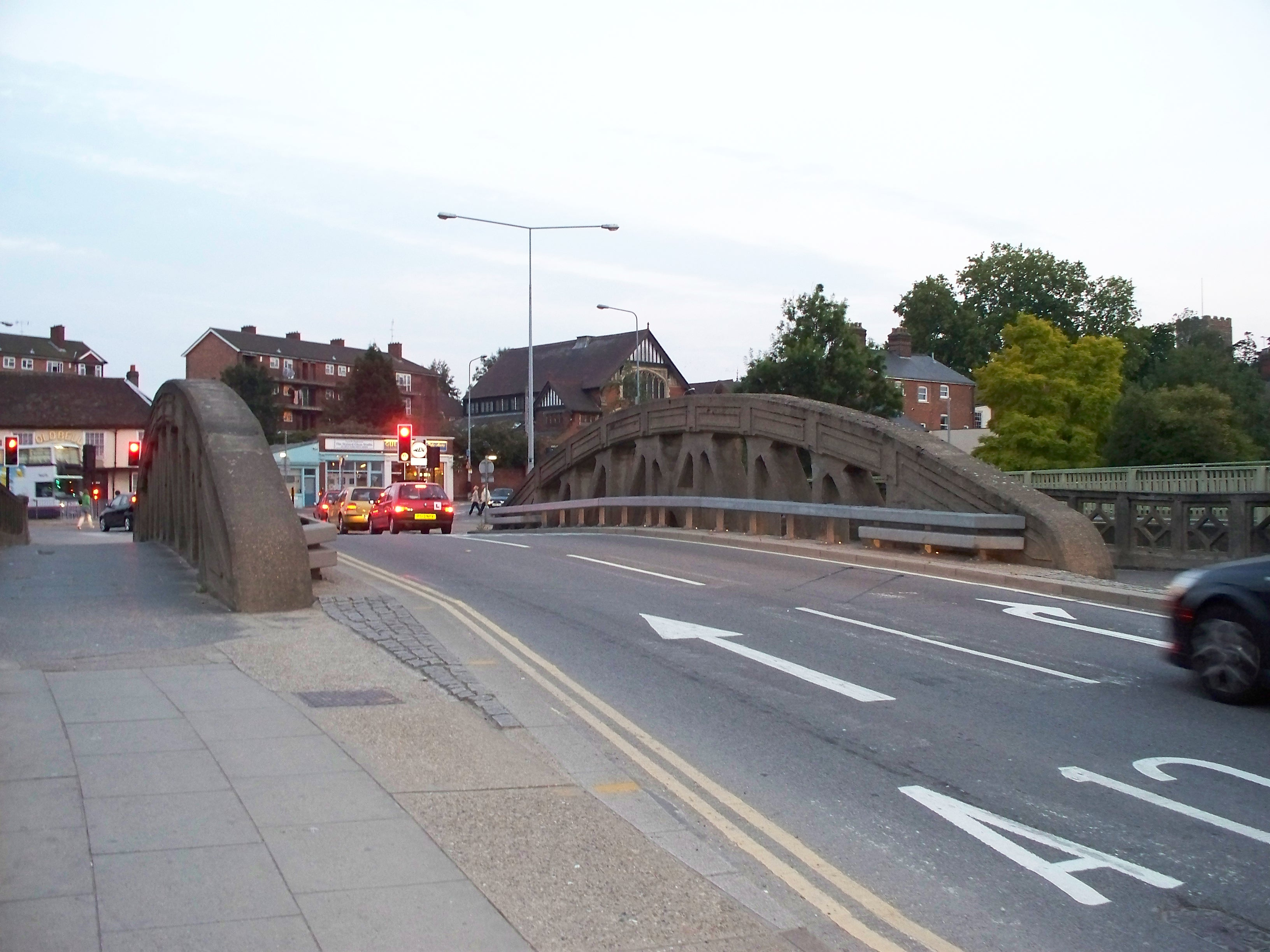
Stoke Bridge, from town centre side

Stoke Bridge in Ipswich carries Bridge Street (A137) over the point at which the River Gipping becomes the River Orwell. It carries traffic into Ipswich from the suburb of Over Stoke. The bridge consists of two separate structures and is just upstream from Ipswich dock on a tidal section of the river.

== History ==
There are records of a bridge existing on the site from the late 13th Century. The fact that the Domesday Book mentions Saint Mary at Stoke implies that a crossing existed much earlier. The bridge was built close to where there was formerly a ford. Near the ford, at Stoke Quay, archaeological evidence of Saxon occupation has been found.

The town records of the reign of Elizabeth I note that 28 loads of timber were transported from Whitton for the building of Stoke Bridge.

Stoke Bridge is featured in John Speed's map of Ipswich of 1610 and Joseph Hodskinson's map of 1783. In 1779, there is a record of two sturdy beggars, who stood on Stoke Bridge on a Sunday morning, insulting any who did not give them money.

By 1801 the bridge was made of brick and stone, but no records of its construction have been found in the Corporation Records. On the 12th April 1818, the bridge collapsed after much rain and heavy flooding, such that "the whole valley resembled a huge lake". Three men were standing on it at the time, admiring the rushing waters, and were tipped in. Two were rescued, but one was drowned, his body recovered days later. Engineer William Cubitt succeeded in constructing a temporary floating bridge. His firm, Ransomes, erected a cast-iron bridge. The ironwork was made in Dudley, Worcestershire, sent in sections by canal to Gainsborough on the Trent, and then to Ipswich by sea.

A concrete bridge replaced the cqst-iron one in the 1920s, with a second being added alongside in 1982-3. The current southbound bridge has a plaque celebrating the bridge's erection over 1924 and 1925. The bridge was the southernmost crossing of the river in Ipswich until the construction of Orwell Bridge in the 1980s.

== See also ==
- Map sources for Stoke Bridge
