= IP postcode area =

Postcode area within the United Kingdom

Ipswich
- Postcode area
- Coordinates: 52.202°N 1.084°E
- Country: United Kingdom
- Postcode area: IP
- Postcode area name: Ipswich
- Post towns: 15
- Postcode districts: 34
- Postcode sectors: 115
- Postcodes (live): 20,616
- Postcodes (total): 26,871
- Statistics as at May 2020

The IP postcode area, also known as the Ipswich postcode area, is a group of 33 postcode districts in the east of England, within 15 post towns. These cover most of Suffolk (including Ipswich, Bury St Edmunds, Aldeburgh, Brandon, Eye, Felixstowe, Halesworth, Leiston, Saxmundham, Southwold, Stowmarket and Woodbridge), southern and southwestern Norfolk (including Thetford, Diss and Harleston), and a very small part of Cambridgeshire.

== Coverage ==
The approximate coverage of the postcode districts:

Postcode district	Post town	Coverage	Local authority area(s)
IP1	IPSWICH	North West Ipswich, Akenham	Ipswich
IP2	IPSWICH	South West Ipswich, Belstead, Wherstead, Stoke Park	Ipswich
IP3	IPSWICH	South East Ipswich, Ravenswood	Ipswich
IP4	IPSWICH	North East Ipswich	Ipswich
IP5	IPSWICH	Rushmere St Andrew, Kesgrave, Martlesham Heath	East Suffolk
IP6	IPSWICH	Needham Market, Creeting St. Mary, Barham, Henley, Claydon, Witnesham	Mid Suffolk, East Suffolk
IP7	IPSWICH	Hadleigh, Milden	Babergh
IP8	IPSWICH	Copdock, Belstead	Babergh
IP9	IPSWICH	Shotley Peninsula: Capel St Mary, Chelmondiston, Shotley	Babergh
IP10	IPSWICH	Kirton, Nacton, Levington	East Suffolk
IP11	FELIXSTOWE	Felixstowe, Trimley St. Martin, Trimley St. Mary	East Suffolk
IP12	WOODBRIDGE	Woodbridge, Melton, Orford	East Suffolk
IP13	WOODBRIDGE	Woodbridge, Easton, Framlingham, Little Bealings, Laxfield,	East Suffolk, Mid Suffolk
IP14	STOWMARKET	Stowmarket, Stowupland	Mid Suffolk
IP15	ALDEBURGH	Aldeburgh	East Suffolk
IP16	LEISTON	Leiston, Aldringham, Eastbridge, Sizewell, Theberton, Thorpeness	East Suffolk
IP17	SAXMUNDHAM	Saxmundham, Yoxford, Darsham	East Suffolk
IP18	SOUTHWOLD	Southwold, Easton Bavents, Reydon, Walberswick	East Suffolk
IP19	HALESWORTH	Cratfield, Ubbeston, Halesworth, Walpole, Rumburgh	East Suffolk
IP20	HARLESTON	Harleston, Mendham, Withersdale Street, Metfield, Wortwell, Redenhall, Needham	South Norfolk, East Suffolk
IP21	DISS	Thorpe Abbotts, Pulham Market, Pulham St Mary, Wingfield	South Norfolk, Mid Suffolk
IP21	EYE	Stradbroke, Fressingfield, Syleham	Mid Suffolk, South Norfolk
IP22	DISS	Diss, Winfarthing, Burston, Roydon, Garboldisham, Botesdale	South Norfolk, Mid Suffolk
IP23	EYE	Eye, Thorndon, Thwaite, Brome	Mid Suffolk
IP24	THETFORD	Thetford, Barnham, Great Hockham	Breckland, West Suffolk
IP25	THETFORD	Watton, Shipdham, Saham Toney	Breckland
IP26	THETFORD	Hilborough, Feltwell, Methwold, Hockwold cum Wilton, Northwold	Breckland, King's Lynn and West Norfolk
IP27	BRANDON	Brandon, Lakenheath, Weeting	West Suffolk, Breckland, King's Lynn and West Norfolk
IP28	BURY ST. EDMUNDS	Mildenhall, Culford, Red Lodge	West Suffolk, East Cambridgeshire
IP29	BURY ST. EDMUNDS	Barrow, Shimpling	West Suffolk
IP30	BURY ST. EDMUNDS	Elmswell, Cockfield, Woolpit	West Suffolk, Mid Suffolk
IP31	BURY ST. EDMUNDS	Ixworth, Thurston, Great Barton, Stanton	West Suffolk, Mid Suffolk
IP32	BURY ST. EDMUNDS	Bury St Edmunds (north and east)	West Suffolk
IP33	BURY ST. EDMUNDS	Bury St Edmunds (south, west and town centre), Westley	West Suffolk
IP98	DISS	Bulk Mail	non-geographic

== Map ==
IP postcode area map, showing postcode districts in red and post towns in grey text, with links to nearby CB, CO, NR and PE postcode areas.

== See also ==
- Postcode Address File
- List of postcode areas in the United Kingdom
