= Washbrook =

Village in Suffolk, England

Coordinates: 52.035934°N 1.086523°E

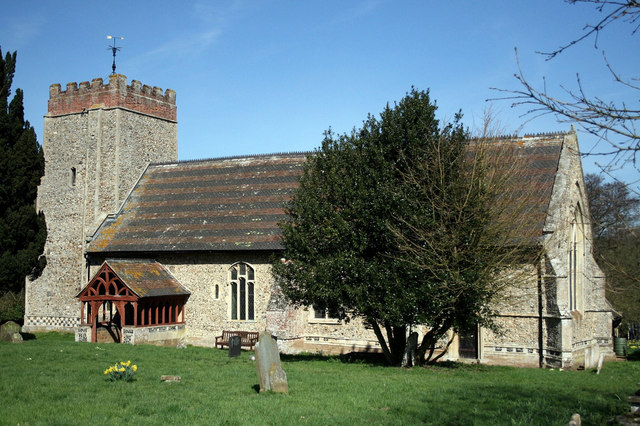
- St Mary's Church

- Location within Suffolk
- Area: 0.2175 km^{2} (0.0840 sq mi)
- Population: 517 (2011 census)
  - Density: 2,377/km^{2} (6,160/sq mi)
- OS grid reference: TM118420
- Civil parish: Copdock and Washbrook
- District: Babergh
- Shire county: Suffolk
- Region: East
- Country: England
- Sovereign state: United Kingdom
- Police: Suffolk
- Fire: Suffolk
- Ambulance: East of England

Washbrook is a village and former civil parish 3 miles (4.8 km) south west of Ipswich, now in the parish of Copdock and Washbrook, in the Babergh district, in the county of Suffolk, England. In 2011 the built-up area had a population of 517.

== Features ==
Washbrook has a church called St Mary's Church. Washbrook had a Sunday school that was established in 1833. Washbrook formerly had a second church.

== History ==
The name "Washbrook" means 'Washing brook' or 'flooding brook'. Washbrook was called "Great Belstead" in Saxon times while the present Belstead was called "Little Belstead". The village is likely one of the sources of the surname Washbrook. As of 1958 Washbrook Street was a secondary settlement for Washbrook. In 1961 the parish had a population of 368. On 1 April 1994 the parish was abolished and merged with Copdock to form Copdock and Washbrook. Parts of Washbrook went to form the new parish of Pinewood and parts went to Chattisham, Sproughton and Belstead.
