= Washbrook (surname) =

Washbrook is a locational surname of British origin, named after villages such as Washbrook in Suffolk. The name may refer to:

- Cyril Washbrook (1914–1999), British cricket player
- Danny Washbrook (born 1985), British rugby league player
