= Belstead Brook Division, Suffolk =

Electoral division in Suffolk, England

Belstead Brook
- County Council constituency for the Suffolk County Council
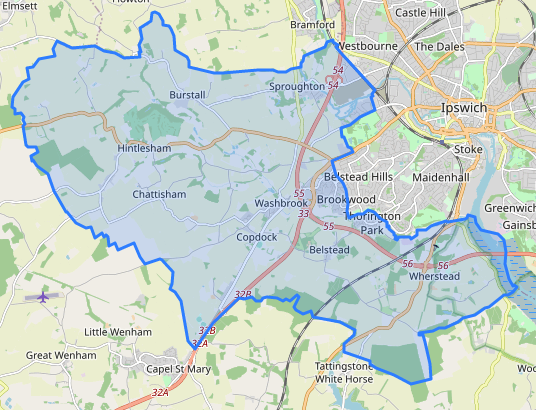
- Belstead Brook Electoral Division
- District: Babergh
- Region: East of England
- Population: 8,619 (2019)
- Electorate: 6,613 (2021)
- Major settlements: Pinewood, Sproughton

Current constituency
- Created: 1985
- Seats: 1
- Councillor: Christopher Hudson (Reform UK)
- Local council: Babergh District Council

Belstead Brook Division is an electoral division in Babergh District, Suffolk which returns a single County Councillor to Suffolk County Council.

== Geography ==
Named for the Belstead Brook watercourse, it comprises two wards, Brook and Pinewood.

=== Parishes ===
The following parishes are in the Belstead Brook Division.

- Belstead
- Burstall
- Chattisham
- Copdock and Washbrook
- Hintlesham
- Pinewood
- Sproughton
- Wherstead

== Members for Belstead Brook ==
Member	Party	Term
J Clayton	Conservative	1985–1989
K Linge	Conservative	1989–1993
Kathy Pollard	Liberal Democrats	1993–2013
David Busby	Liberal Democrats	2013–2017
Christopher Hudson	Conservative	2017–2024
Christopher Hudson	Reform UK	2024–present

== Election results ==
=== Elections in the 2020s ===
2021 Suffolk County Council election: Belstead Brook
Party	Candidate	Votes	%	±%
Conservative	Christopher Hudson	1,087	50.8	+9.9
Liberal Democrats	David Busby	721	33.7	–3.7
Labour	Keith Wade	333	15.6	+2.9
Majority		366	17.1	+13.6
Turnout		2,160	32.7	+0.9
Registered electors		6,613		
Conservative hold		Swing	–6.8	

Preceded by Chantry	Division held by the Opposition leader of SCC; 2009–2013	Succeeded by St John's
