= Belstead Brook =

Watercourse in Suffolk, England

Coordinates: 52.034°N 1.1494°E

Belstead Brook, or the Bourne, rises in Naughton in Suffolk, and passes south of Ipswich past the Pinewood district which is southwest of the town. It enters the River Orwell at Bourne Bridge. At Ipswich, it is bordered by Bourne Park Reed Beds and Ostrich Meadow, Bourne Park, Ashground Plantation, Bobbits Hole SSSI, Kiln Meadow and Belstead Brook Park.

There is a Belstead Brook electoral division of Suffolk County Council.
