= Withersdale Street =

Village in Suffolk, England

Coordinates: 52.380586°N 1.334848°E

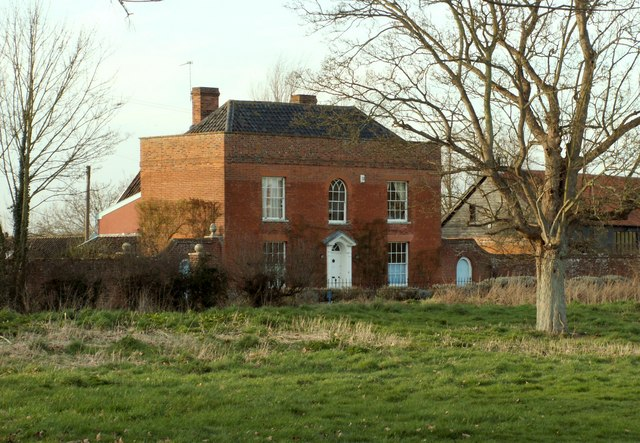

- Location within Suffolk
- Civil parish: Mendham
- District: East Suffolk
- Shire county: Suffolk
- Region: East
- Country: England
- Sovereign state: United Kingdom
- Post town: HARLESTON
- Postcode district: IP20
- Dialling code: 01379
- Police: Suffolk
- Fire: Suffolk
- Ambulance: East of England
- UK Parliament: Waveney Valley

Withersdale Street is a village in the civil parish of Mendham, in the East Suffolk district, on the Norfolk/Suffolk border, in the Waveney Valley. The village is predominantly a ribbon development, along the B1123, from Harleston to Halesworth. To the west of the village lies Mendham Priory, an early 19th century neo-classical mansion, with a Doric style porch, whilst to the east, the Red House, a later Georgian red brick building also mentioned by Pevsner, faces towards the new village hall and overlooks the playing field.

The original Mendham Priory was founded in the middle of the 12th Century and fell into decay. There is still a mound of flint relating to the medieval Cluniac Priory of St Mary on the marshes beside the River Waveney, to the north of the present Mendham Priory. However, much of the building material of the original Priory was removed and used in the surrounding parishes. This was located at a different site to the present house called Mendham Priory. Much of this material however can be found in the walled garden and in the Lodge of the present building. The estate was purchased in 1824 by Alexander Adair and by the mid-1870s Mendham Priory was home to the Dimmock family and formed the centre of a working estate. The Dimmock family remained at Mendham Priory well into the 20th Century. Mendham Priory also survived a nearby bomb blast during the Second World War which is said to have lifted the entire roof of the conservatory without breaking a single pane of glass.

Each village had its own brickworks - Withersdale is no exception. Kiln House has its own kiln in the back garden and there is a clay pit at the top of Pegg's Hill, overlooking the village from the south. Other bricks have been used in local houses from nearby villages. St Cross South Elmham had its own brickworks, with the mark of a cross within the face of the brick, only revealed now when a wall is knocked down and the structure of the brick revealed. Grange Lodge was the old police station, whilst the Old Post House originally had petrol pumps outside. Withersdale Cross was once the village pub, the Golden Cross, the sign for which can still be seen in the roof tiles. This also housed Withersdale Ceramics, founded by John and Fiona Cutting in the early 1970s, examples of whose tiles in clock faces and pot stands still appear in local auctions or houses within the village. The designs were screen printed on to the tiles and then hand painted, often by people from the village.

In November 2009, the new village hall was opened by Rebecca Knight from OperaBabes, having been built on land to the east of the village. It was the culmination of funding from, amongst others, Suffolk County Council, Mid Suffolk District Council, Suffolk Environmental Trust, Adnams, the Clothworkers' Foundation, Garfield Weston, the Rank Foundation and the Suffolk Foundation and including much effort from the local community. In 2012, a Multi-Use Games Area or MUGA was added to the north side of the village hall. It has flood lights so that it can be used in the evenings. Two new storage buildings were added to the village hall site in 2015, together subsequently with two boules boulodromes or pitches.
