= Pinewood, Suffolk =

Civil parish in Suffolk, England

Coordinates: 52.037°N 1.110°E

Pinewood
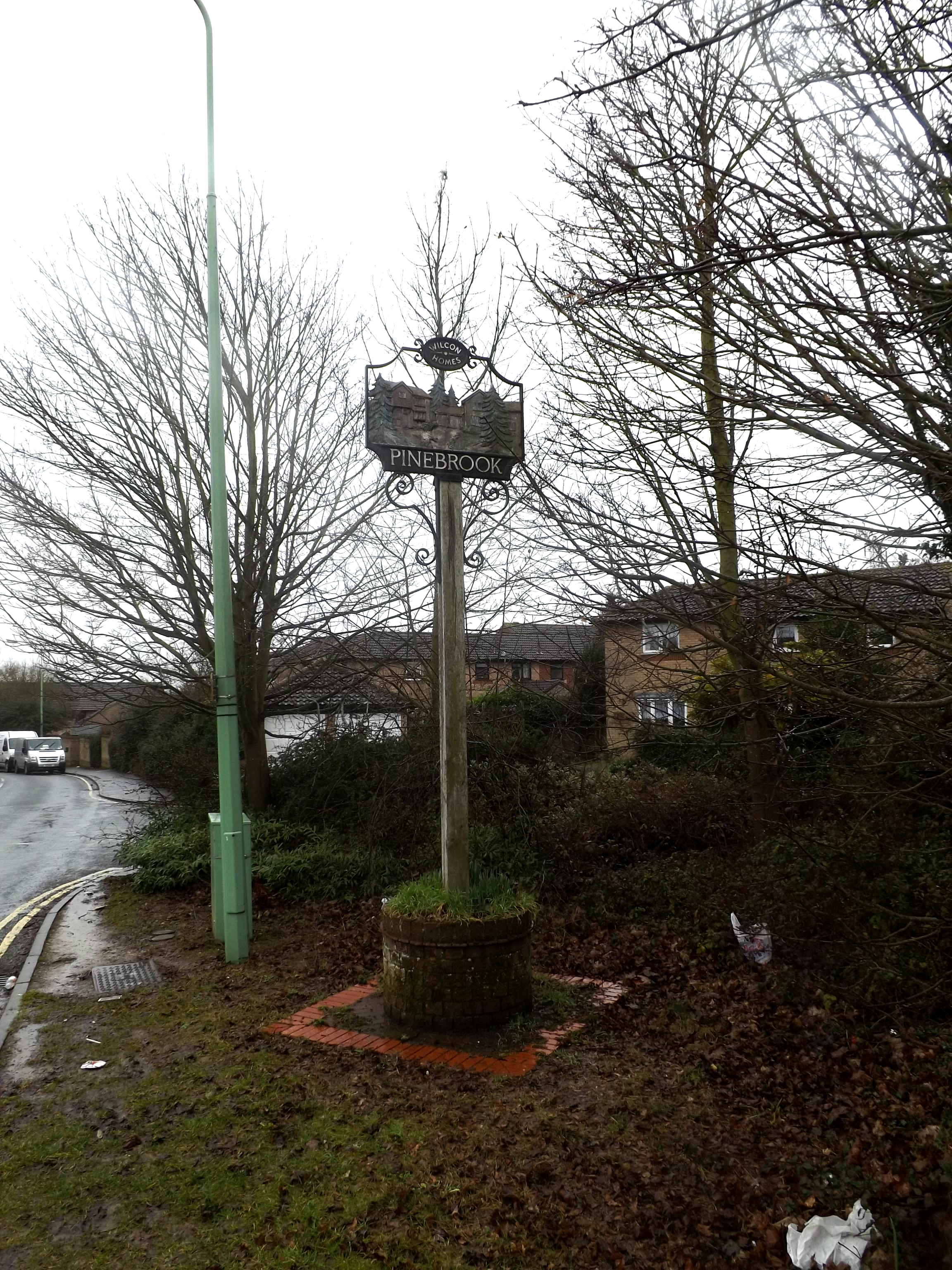
- Pinebrook Village Sign

- Location within Suffolk
- Population: 4,342 (2011 census)
- Civil parish: Pinewood
- District: Babergh
- Shire county: Suffolk
- Region: East
- Country: England
- Sovereign state: United Kingdom
- Post town: Ipswich
- Postcode district: IP2, IP8
- UK Parliament: South Suffolk

Pinewood is a civil parish and electoral ward in the Babergh district of the English county of Suffolk. Whilst not part of the borough, it forms part of the town of Ipswich although part of the parish is separated from it by Belstead Brook, a tributary of the River Orwell. The parish was formed on 1 April 1994 from parts of Washbrook, Belstead and Wherstead. It is in the Belstead Brook electoral division of Suffolk County Council. In 2011 it had a population of 4342.

== Bobbitshole SSSI ==
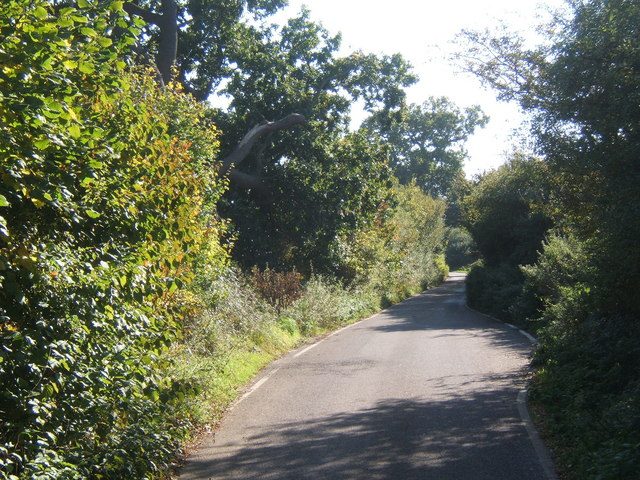
Bobbits Lane, 2008

Bobbitshole is a 1.8 hectares (4.4 acres) Site of Special Scientific Interest (SSSI) designated for its geological importance. The site is to the east of the parish, located on a sewage works site to the south of Belstead Brook. It is a nationally important reference site for the study of the Pleistocene, providing a record of the buildup of sediment and organic material during the last inter-glacial period. The site was discovered during excavation of the sewage works site and was designated in 1987.
