= Copdock =

Village and former civil parish in Suffolk, England

Coordinates: 52.030687°N 1.081595°E

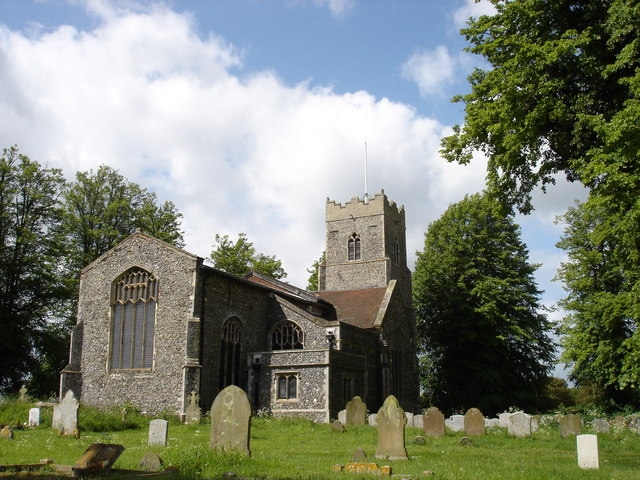
- St. Peter's, Copdock

- Location within Suffolk
- OS grid reference: TM1141
- Civil parish: Copdock and Washbrook
- District: Babergh
- Shire county: Suffolk
- Region: East
- Country: England
- Sovereign state: United Kingdom
- Post town: IPSWICH
- Postcode district: IP8
- Dialling code: 01473
- Police: Suffolk
- Fire: Suffolk
- Ambulance: East of England

Copdock is a village and former civil parish, now in the parish of Copdock and Washbrook, in the Babergh district, in the county of Suffolk, England. In 1961 the civil parish had a population of 399.

== Location ==
Copdock is 4.8 kilometres (3 mi) south-west of Ipswich. It is located on the former A12 road (now designated as the C475), which was blocked off at Whights Corner after the construction of the Copdock Interchange and the A14 road Ipswich bypass.

== Governance ==
On 1 April 1994 the parish was merged with Washbrook to form "Copdock and Washbrook".

== Description ==
It has a local primary school called Copdock Primary School, and the local church is called St. Peter's Copdock and is a Church of England. The local village hall, located on the old A12, was built in 1991, and is situated within the grounds of the local playing fields. Various sports clubs use the playing fields; and they are home to a thriving cricket team, Copdock & Old Ipswichian CC. The Best Western Ipswich Hotel is located opposite the village hall.

== Notable persons ==
William Henry Hewitt, recipient of the Victoria Cross, was born in Copdock in 1884.
