= Bourne Bridge, Suffolk =

Bridge in Suffolk, England

Coordinates: 52.034°N 1.1494°E

Bourne Bridge in Suffolk is an historic bridge over Belstead Brook. It provided the boundary mark between Ipswich and Wherstead. The date at which a bridge replaced the previous ford is unknown, but the bridge was mentioned in 1352/3 in the reign of Edward III. To the west of the bridge is Bourne Park, to the east, a marina and the pub formerly called The Ostrich.
