= Stoke High School – Ormiston Academy =

Stoke High School

Location
- Maidenhall Approach; Ipswich, Suffolk, IP2 8PL; England
- Coordinates: 52.04312°N 1.14905°E

Information
- Type: Academy
- Department for Education URN: 140032 Tables
- Ofsted: Reports
- Principal: Ms K Baldwin
- Gender: Coeducational
- Age: 11 to 16
- Website: www.stokehighoa.co.uk

Stoke High School is a coeducational secondary school with academy status, located in Maidenhall, Ipswich, Suffolk, England.

The school converted to academy status in October 2013 and is sponsored by the Ormiston Academies Trust.

In late 2018, the school was involved in a scandal in which an adult asylum seeker aged approximately 30 attended classes purporting to be a 15-year-old boy.

== See also ==
- List of schools in Suffolk
