= Maidenhall Estate =

Housing estate in Ipswich, Suffolk, England

Coordinates: 52.045919°N 1.145797°E

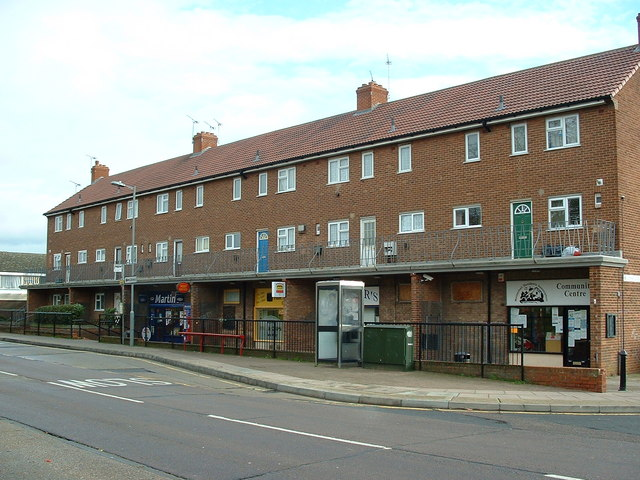
Shops, including the offices of the Maidenhall Residents Association

The Maidenhall Estate is a council estate in Ipswich, in the Ipswich district, in the county of Suffolk, England. In 1975 the remains of a mammoth were excavated at Stoke High School, some of the bones of which are on display at Ipswich Museum.

== Amenities ==
Maidenhall has the Hillside Primary School, Stoke High School, Stoke Green Baptist Church and a sports centre.

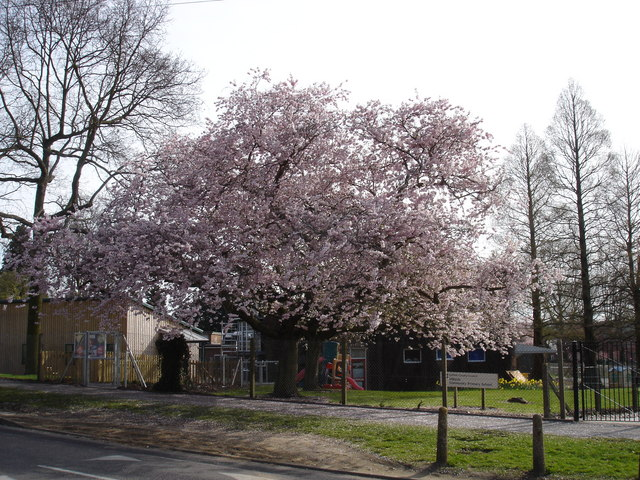
Hillside Primary school
