= Mendham, Suffolk =

Village in Suffolk, England

Coordinates: 52.397669°N 1.337629°E

Mendham
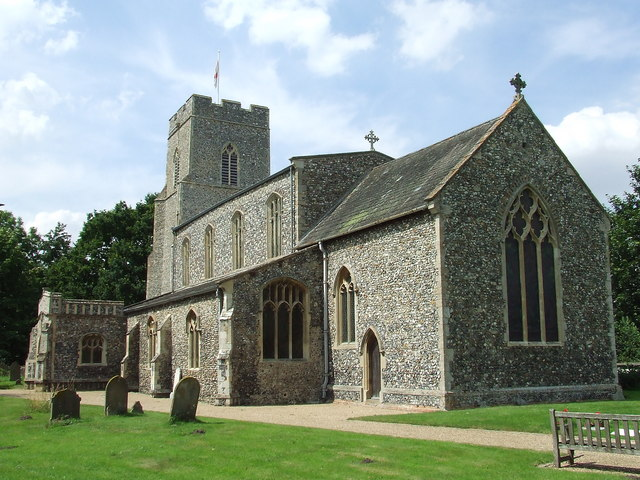
- Church of All Saints

- Location within Suffolk
- Population: 451
- District: Mid Suffolk
- Shire county: Suffolk
- Region: East
- Country: England
- Sovereign state: United Kingdom
- Post town: HARLESTON
- Postcode district: IP20
- Dialling code: 01379
- Police: Suffolk
- Fire: Suffolk
- Ambulance: East of England
- UK Parliament: Waveney Valley

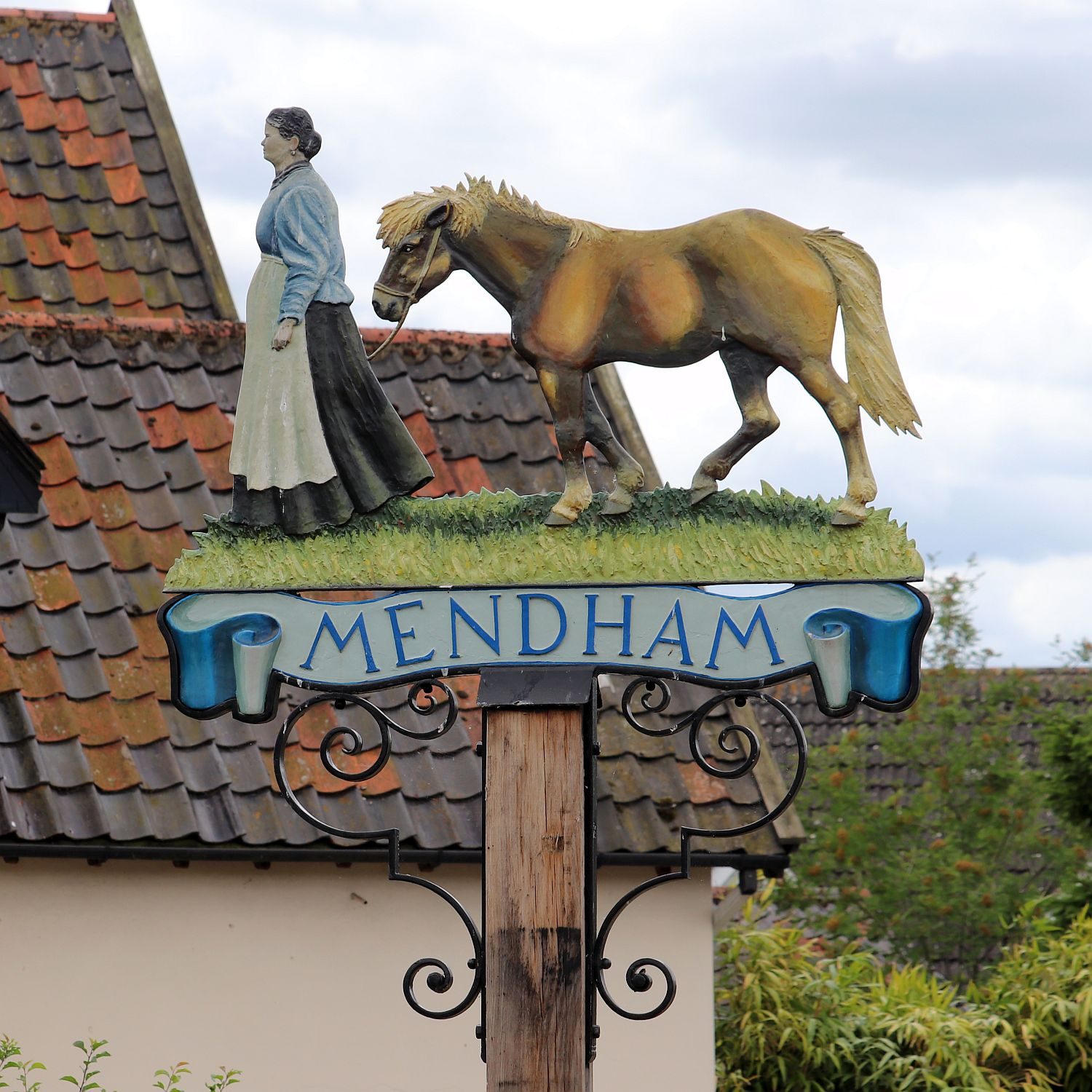
Mendham village sign

Mendham is a village and civil parish in the Mid Suffolk district of Suffolk in eastern England. Located on the east bank of the River Waveney around a mile east of Harleston, the parish includes the hamlets of Withersdale Street. The Mendham Marshes are also within the parish boundaries.

All Saints Church is a medieval church, Grade I listed, that was restored in the 1860s. It is now one of six churches in the Sancroft Benefice. The village of Mendham came under Mendham Priory until the dissolution of the monasteries. Mendham Priory then became a private house. The present house is an early 19th century neo-classical mansion, with a Doric style porch, built for Alexander Adair. The Priory was later the home of the Dimmock family.

Until the 19th century, around 25% of the parish fell in Norfolk and 75% in Suffolk.

Mendham's most famous son, born to a local miller, was Alfred Munnings KCVO, PRA (8 October 1878 – 17 July 1959), known as one of England's finest painters of horses, and as an outspoken enemy of Modernism. An extract of one of his paintings, featuring gypsy Charlotte Gray leading a pony, has been incorporated into the Mendham village sign. Her husband, Frederick "Nobby" Gray, was one of Munnings' closest friends and a model in some of his paintings. Both Nobby and Charlotte are buried in All Saints churchyard in Mendham.

Two-time world champion darts player Peter Wright also lives in Mendham.
