= Stoke Tunnel Cutting, Ipswich =

Site of Special Scientific Interest in Ipswich, Suffolk

Coordinates: 52.046°N 1.15°E

- Site of Special Scientific Interest
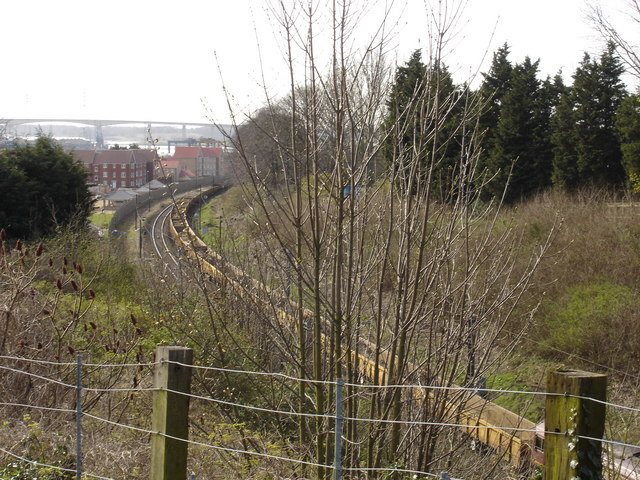
- Location of Stoke Tunnel Cutting, Ipswich.
- Area of search: Suffolk
- Grid reference: TM 161 433
- Interest: Geological
- Area: 2.2 hectares
- Notification date: 1990
- Location map: Magic Map

Stoke Tunnel Cutting, Ipswich is a 2.2-hectare (5.4-acre) geological Site of Special Scientific Interest in Ipswich in Suffolk. It is a Geological Conservation Review site.

This fossiliferous site dates to the late Marine Isotope Stage 7, around 190,000 years ago. It is part of a high level terrace of the River Orwell and it has European pond tortoises, lions, mammoths, woolly rhinoceroses, horses and voles.

There is no public access to the site.
