= St Mary's Church, Washbrook =

Coordinates: 52.0415°N 1.0746°E

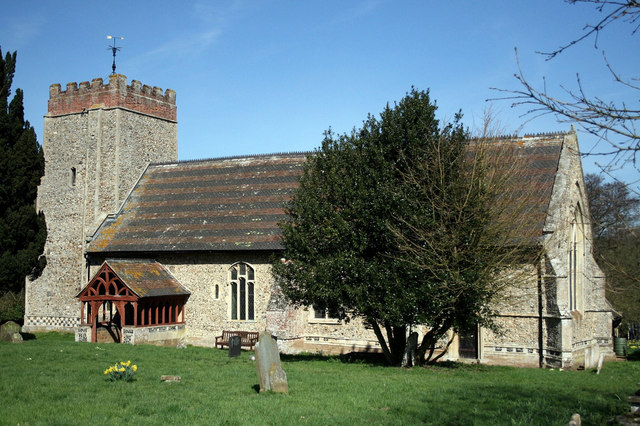
- St Mary's Church, Washbrook, from the south

- Location in Suffolk
- OS grid reference: TM 110 426
- Location: Washbrook, Suffolk
- Country: England
- Denomination: Anglican
- Website: Churches Conservation Trust

Architecture
- Functional status: Redundant
- Heritage designation: Grade II*
- Designated: 22 February 1955
- Architect: Edmund Buckton Lamb (restoration)
- Architectural type: Church
- Style: Norman, Gothic
- Groundbreaking: 12th century
- Completed: 1866

Specifications
- Materials: Flint with some brick and stone dressings, tiled roof

St Mary's Church is a redundant Anglican church in the village of Washbrook, Suffolk, England. It is recorded in the National Heritage List for England as a designated Grade II* listed building, and is under the care of the Churches Conservation Trust. It stands in an isolated position in fields about 3 miles (5 km) west of the centre of Ipswich.

== History ==
The oldest fabric in the church dates from the 12th century, but most is from the 14th century. In 1866 the church was restored by Edmund Buckton Lamb, and a north baptistry was added.

== Architecture ==
=== Exterior ===
St Mary's is constructed in flint rubble and some brick, with stone dressings. The roof is tiled, with alternating bands of red and black fishscale tiles. Its plan consists of a nave and a chancel, with a south porch, a north vestry and baptistry, and a west tower. The flint tower is in three stages with a brick battlemented parapet. There are angled buttresses on the west corners and a stair turret at the southeast corner. The turret contains vertical slit openings. The tower stands on a plinth, above which is a band of stone and flint flushwork in a chequerboard pattern. On the west side of the tower is a three-light window dating from the 19th century. There are single bell openings on the north, west and south sides. The south porch dates from the 19th century and is in timber on a brick and flint base. Its roof is in banded tiles. The porch leads to a 19th-century doorway in the style of the 14th century. The nave and chancel also stand on a plinth, which is rendered, above which is a band of alternate stone and flushwork panels, which continues round the church, including the buttresses. To the left of the porch is a two-light window with late Decorated or early Perpendicular tracery and, to its right is a small lancet window, probably dating from the 12th century. To the west of this are two 19th-century three-light windows between which is a buttress and, to the west of these, a chancel door. At the east end are diagonal buttresses. The 19th-century east window has three lights. The windows in the north wall are similar to those on the south side.

=== Interior ===
The 14th-century stone carving in the chancel is "exquisite". This is to be found in the six-bay arcades, the window tracery, the stalls with canopies, the sedilia and piscina, and an Easter sepulchre. In the baptistry is a 15th-century font with an octagonal bowl. This is carried on pilaster shafts with four carved lions. Under the bowl are carvings of angels holding shields, alternating with roses and acanthus-like leaves.

== See also ==
- List of churches preserved by the Churches Conservation Trust in the East of England
