= Bourne Park Reed Beds =

Nature reserve in Suffolk, United Kingdom

Coordinates: 52.032°N 1.139°E

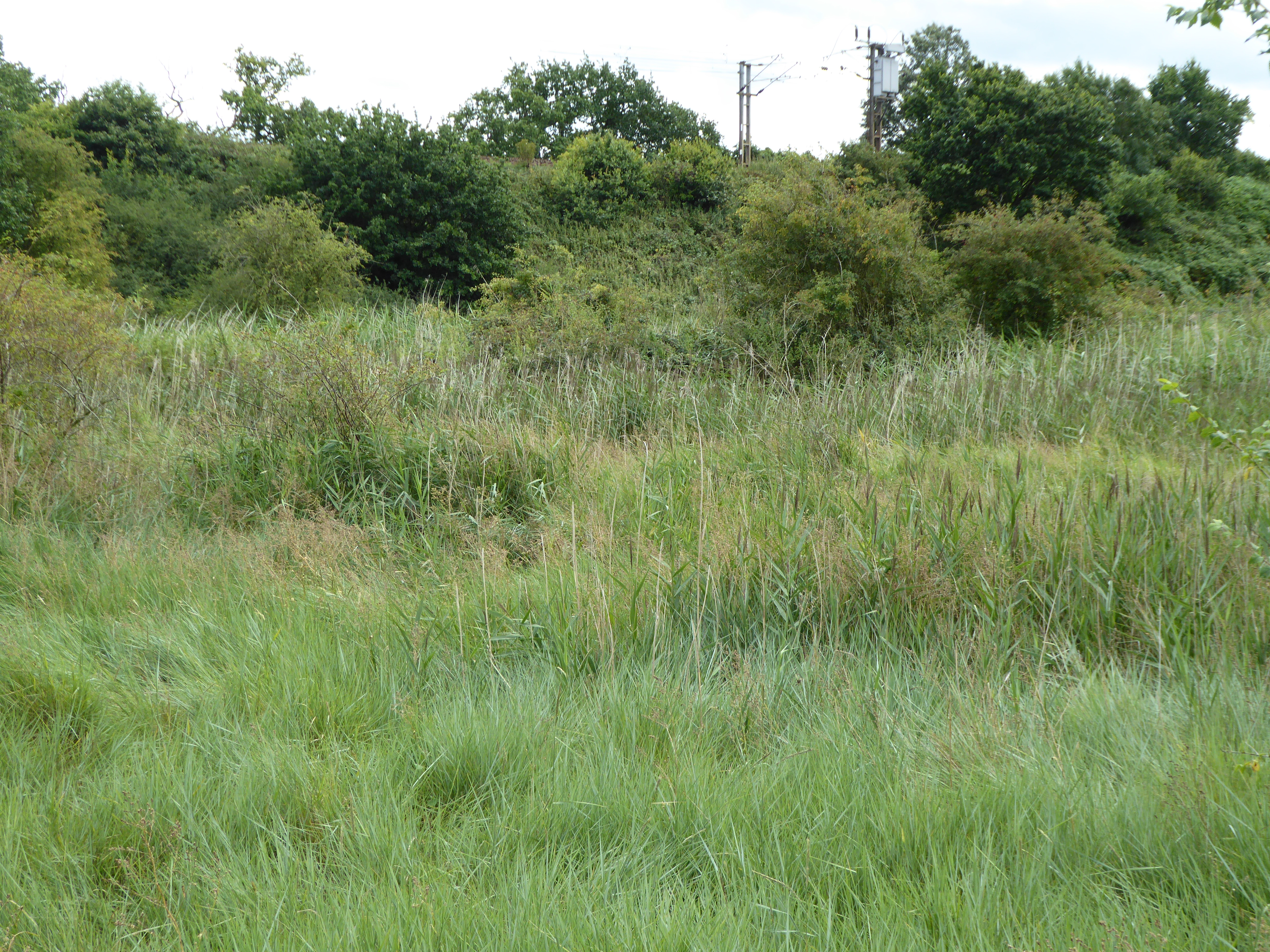
- Interactive map of Bourne Park Reed Beds
- Type: Local Nature Reserve
- Location: Ipswich, Suffolk
- OS grid: TM 154417
- Area: 7.4 hectares (18 acres)
- Manager: Greenways Project, Ipswich Borough Council

Bourne Park Reed Beds is a 7.4 hectare Local Nature Reserve on the southern outskirts of Ipswich in Suffolk, United Kingdom. It is owned and managed by Ipswich Borough Council.

This nature reserve in Bourne Park is a linear area of reed beds, scrub woodland and tall herb fen, along the north bank of Belstead Brook.
