= Stoke Park, Suffolk =

Suburb in Ipswich, Suffolk, England

Coordinates: 52.03533°N 1.13142°E

Stoke Park
- St Peter's Church

- Location within Suffolk
- District: Ipswich
- Shire county: Suffolk
- Region: East
- Country: England
- Sovereign state: United Kingdom
- Police: Suffolk
- Fire: Suffolk
- Ambulance: East of England

Stoke Park was a country estate located at the southern edge of the Stoke ridge. The estate was owned by the Barons Gwydyr, and sold in the 1920s to pay death duties. The main estate house was demolished in the 1930s. Located about where Glastonbury Close now is, the house was formally approached from Belstead Road, and could also be approached through what is now Bourne Park. The pond below the house was filled in and became the site of St Peter's Church, Stoke Park during the 1970s.

Stoke Park is now a residential area which gave its name to Stoke Park Ward located in the South West Area of Ipswich, in the English county of Suffolk.
