= Belstead =

Village in Suffolk, England

Coordinates: 52.027887°N 1.106375°E

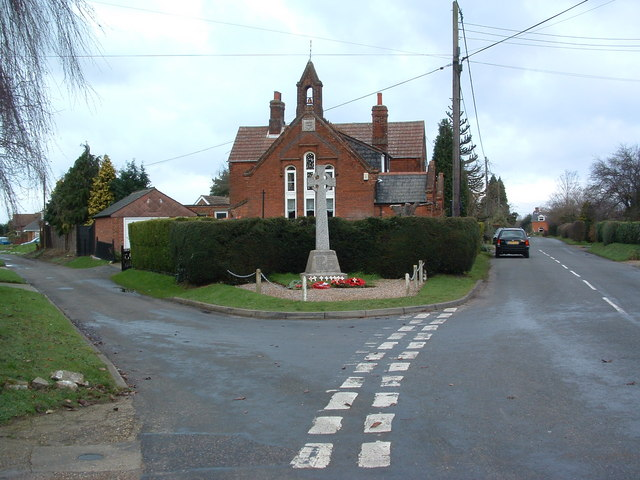
- Belstead War Memorial

- Location within Suffolk
- Interactive map of Belstead
- Area: 3.06 km^{2} (1.18 sq mi)
- Population: 202 Census, 2011
  - Density: 66/km^{2} (170/sq mi)
- OS grid reference: TM1341
- District: Babergh
- Shire county: Suffolk
- Region: East
- Country: England
- Sovereign state: United Kingdom
- Post town: IPSWICH
- Postcode district: IP8
- Dialling code: 01473

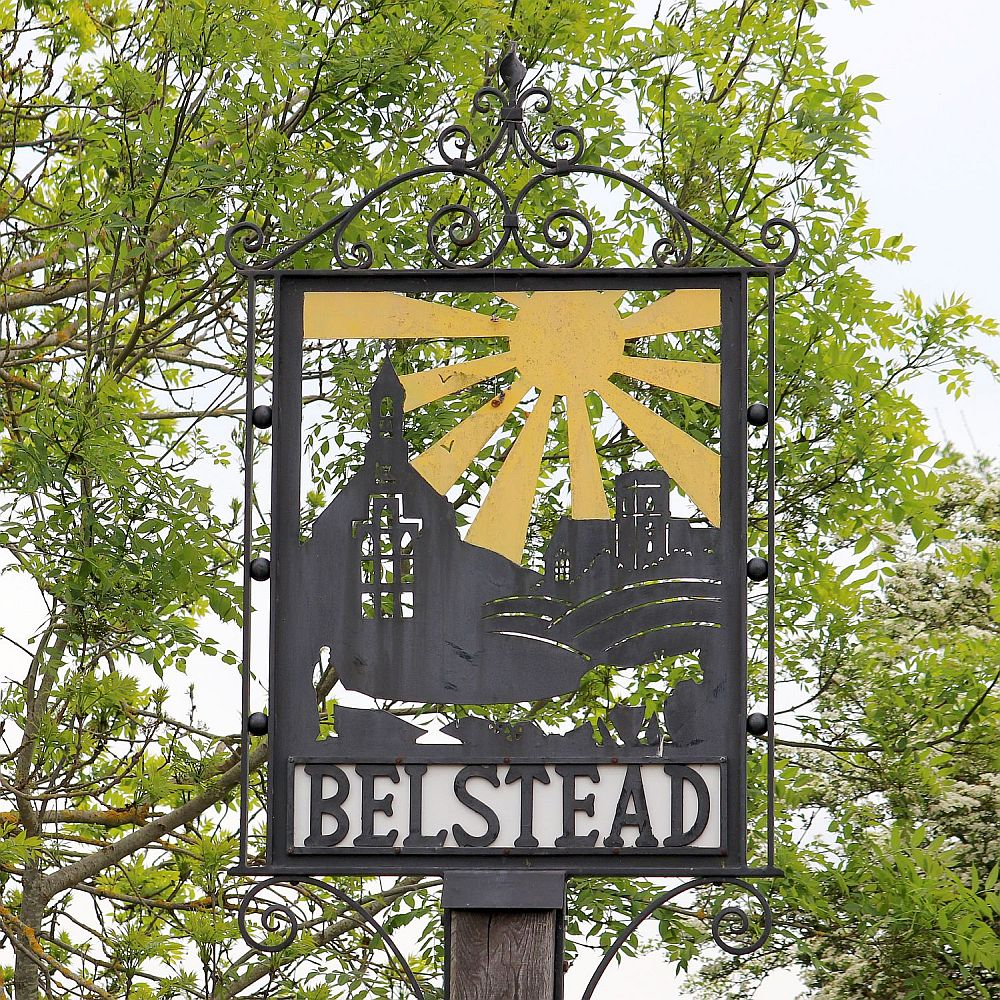
Belstead Village Sign

Belstead is a village and civil parish in the Babergh district of the English county of Suffolk. Located on the southern edge of Ipswich, around 3 miles (5 km) south-west of Ipswich town centre. It had a population of 202 according to the 2011 census. Belstead has amenities such as a village hall, St Mary's the Virgin Church, The bridge school for children with learning difficulties and Belstead Brook Hotel and Spa. It is in the Belstead Brook electoral division of Suffolk County Council.

== History ==
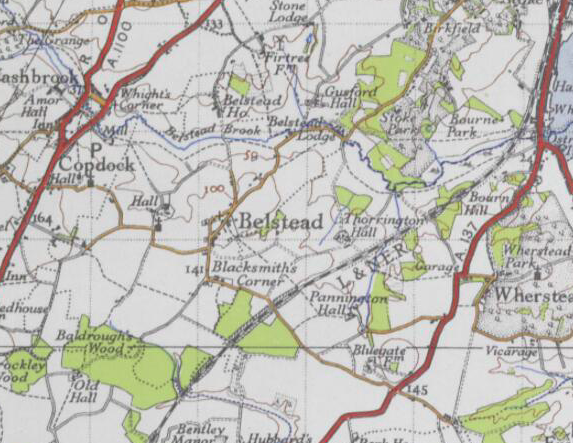
Map of Belstead in Suffolk, 1946.

In John Marius Wilson's Imperial Gazetteer of England and Wales Vol. I, p.151 (1870) Belstead is described like this:

BELSTEAD, a parish in Samford district, Suffolk; near the Eastern Union railway, 3½ miles SW of Ipswich. Post Town, Ipswich. Acres, 1,022. Real property, £1,849. Pop., 292. Houses, 57. The property is divided among a few. The living is a rectory in the diocese of Norwich. Value, £370.* Patron, the Rev. E. J. Lockwood. The church is tolerable; and there is an Independent chapel.

The Ipswich Hoard was found near Belstead in 1968. It is now in the British Museum, but there are copies of the gold torcs in the Ipswich Museum.

== The Bridge School ==
The Bridge School is situated 1.9 miles from Belstead on Sprites Lane. The school is a special school for children aged between three and sixteen years which have severe, profound and complex learning difficulties. The school aims to create a supportive learning environment and to allow their pupils to learn through their achievements. The Ofsted inspection of the school which was carried out in January 2015 gave the school a ‘good’ rating overall.

== St Mary's the Virgin ==
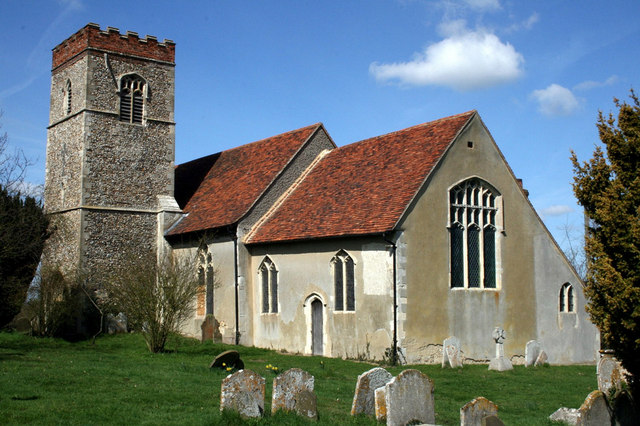
St Mary's Church, Belstead

St Mary's church is located in Belstead. The church holds services for special events such as Remembrance Sunday and a Christmas Carol function as well as monthly events.

In 2005 the church almost became redundant with it needing repairs. With support from the community it became possible for St Mary's Church to remain open as there was support from the community of Belstead. Work took place to clear the graveyard and clean the church.

The structure of the church is believed to be 700 years old. The church is described as below on its website.

Graves & memorials have been identified from 1611 onwards by our village historian. The building is of simple design, unpretentious and attractively rustic, the tower dates from the early 14th century, and is one of only 22 Suffolk towers which form porches. The interior is graced with a number of fittings and memorials dating from its earliest days, including the 15th-century rood screen with paintings of saints and others, all of which were mutilated by Tudor reformers or later by Puritans in the 1640s, a rood loft staircase set into the thickness of the outer wall, monumental brasses, and wooden pews.

== Population ==
Total population of Belstead Suffolk civil parish according to census data from 1881–2011

The population graph from 1881–2011 shows an increase in population up until 1851 when the population was at its highest total population with 308 people living in Belstead. The population then began to decrease with the lowest total population occurring in 2001 when 189 people were living in the village. The decline in population began in the 1850s. In 2005 it had an estimated population of 190.

== Occupation ==
Bar graph showing the occupations of residents in Belstead in 1881.

Graph showing Occupations in Belstead according to the 2011 Census

1881 Occupations - The occupations in 1881 as shown in the graph represent both types of work undertaken by both male and females in the village. In the graph it can be seen that the total highest number of workers for one particular occupation was in the agriculture sector with a total of 50, all male, workers. Females dominated more in domestic office or services as well as all professionals living in the village being female. There were only males working in most other sectors with many females having unknown or being without specified occupations.

2011 Occupations - The total number of residents of a working age of 17 to 74 in 2011 has decreased to a total of 105 workers in employment. Most employed people have professional occupations, at a total of 17 residents. The lowest employment area, with a total of seven people being employed, was in sales and customer service occupations. There has been a vast decrease in the number or residents being employed in the agricultural sector with a decrease from 50 workers in 1881 to 8 in 2011.

== See also ==
- Bobbitshole Site of Special Scientific Interest
