= William Cordell =

English politician (died 1581)

The Right Honourable Sir William Cordell
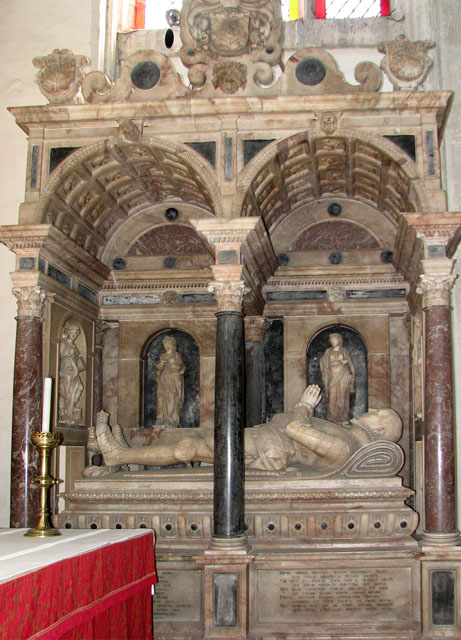
- Monument and effigy of Sir William Cordell, Long Melford Church, Suffolk

Speaker of the House of Commons
- In office 1558–1559
- Monarchs: Mary I Elizabeth I
- Preceded by: Clement Higham
- Succeeded by: Thomas Gargrave

Personal details
- Born: about 1522
- Died: 1581 City of London
- Spouse: Mary Clopton
- Relations: no children
- Profession: Barrister

Sir William Cordell (about 1522 – 17 May 1581) of Melford Hall in the parish of Long Melford, Suffolk, was an English lawyer, landowner, administrator and politician who held high offices under both the Catholic Queen Mary I and the Protestant Queen Elizabeth I.

== Early life ==
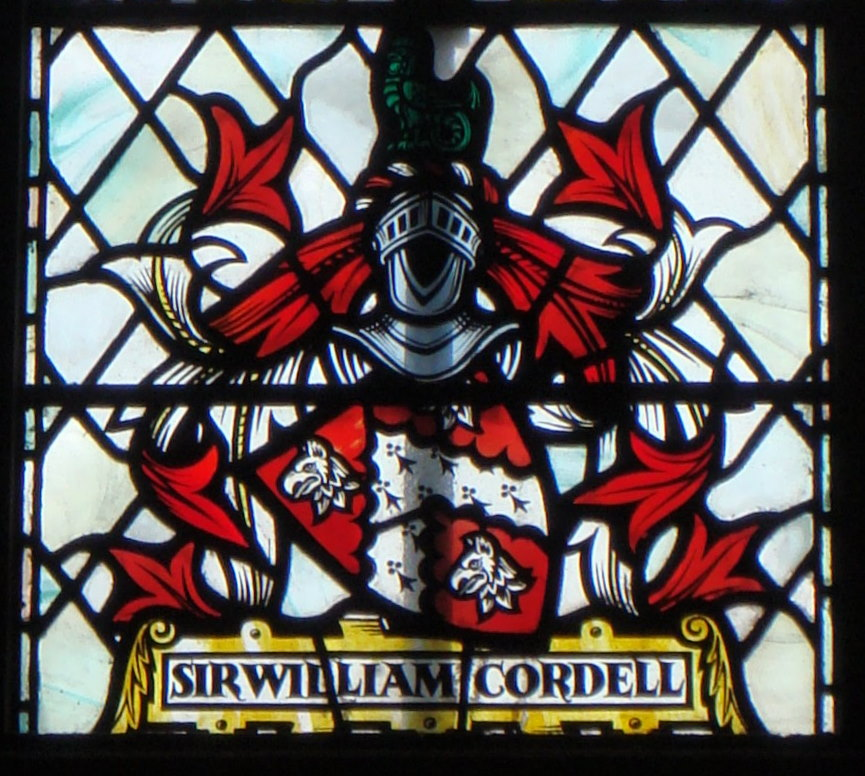
Arms of Sir William Cordell, stained glass window in Lincoln's Inn

Born about 1522, he was the eldest son of John Cordell (died 1553), from Edmonton in Middlesex, and his wife Emma (died 1554), daughter of Henry Webb who lived at Kimbolton in Huntingdonshire. His younger brother Edward also became a lawyer and politician. His father was principal aide to Sir William Clopton (died 1531), an influential lawyer at Lincoln's Inn and owner of Kentwell Hall at Long Melford in Suffolk. Probably brought up in the Clopton household, at age 16 he was sent to study law at Lincoln's Inn, being called to the bar very young in 1544.

== Career ==
He advanced rapidly in both law and politics, acquiring important clients and entering Parliament. He sat for Dunheved in 1545 and 1547, Steyning in March 1553, Suffolk in 1558, Middlesex in 1563 and Westminster in 1571. As well as sitting in the House of Commons, he also held legal posts in the House of Lords.

In 1548 he obtained a grant of arms for his father and in 1549 one for himself, quartering Cordell with his mother's Webb. In 1553 he was appointed Solicitor General, a position he held until 1557 when he became Master of the Rolls and a member of the Privy Council. In 1554 he was appointed to the commission of the peace for the counties of Essex and Suffolk, adding Middlesex in 1561 and sitting on all for life. In 1555 he was a founder member of the Russia Company and a supporter of the foundation of St John's College, Oxford, of which he was appointed first Visitor. In 1558 he was elected Speaker of the House of Commons and knighted. In that year he was executor to Queen Mary and to Cardinal Pole and later, in 1575, to Archbishop Parker. Queen Elizabeth did not include him in her Privy Council but he continued as Master of the Rolls until his death.

In 1554 he had bought the manor of Long Melford and other lands, formerly owned by Bury St Edmunds Abbey, from the crown and started building Melford Hall. Completed in 1559, he entertained Queen Elizabeth lavishly there in 1578.

He died at his official residence in Chancery Lane on 17 May 1581 and was buried in Holy Trinity Church at Long Melford, where his monument stands. At Long Melford he founded the Hospital of the Holy Trinity and in his will left charitable bequests to both Cambridge University, where he may have studied when young, and Oxford University, including £20 to be distributed among the poor scholars of the two universities ‘'unto suche as be moste towardes in vertewe and learninge'’.

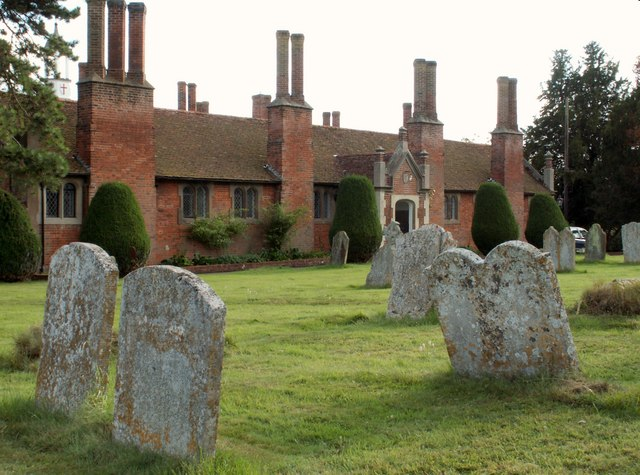
The Hospital of the Holy and Blessed Trinity at Long Melford established in 1573 by Sir William Cordell as an almshouse for 12 aged men and a warden and still serving its original purpose, though now accepting single women and married couples.

== Family ==
His wife was Mary (died 1584), granddaughter of his father's employer Sir William Clopton and daughter of Richard Clopton by his first wife, Margaret, daughter of Sir Richard Bozun of Barrowby in Lincolnshire and his wife Thomasine, daughter and heiress of James Dene. Through her he acquired lands in Lincolnshire and Yorkshire. None of their children survived and his estate passed to his sister Jane (died 1604), who had married Richard Alington.

By 1643 Melford Hall was in the hands of Robert Cordell, first of the Cordell baronets, great-grandson of William's uncle Robert Cordell (died 1548), a brewer in the City of London, and his wife Margaret Hodge.

Political offices
Preceded by Sir John Pollard	Speaker of the House of Commons; 1558	Succeeded by Sir Thomas Gargrave
