= Holy Trinity Church, Long Melford =

Church in Suffolk, England

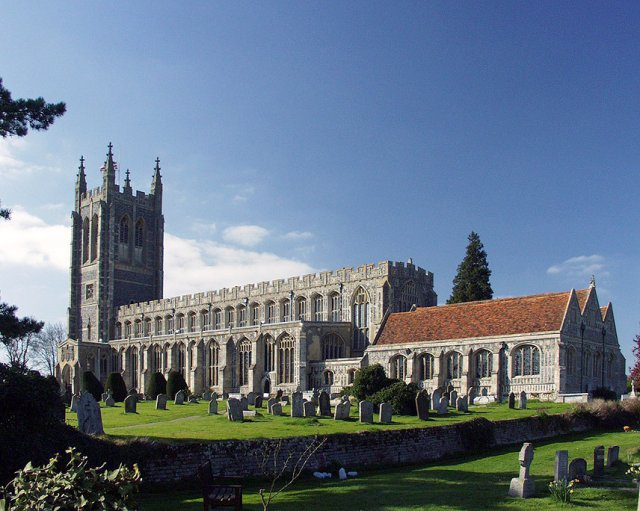
- Holy Trinity Church, Long Melford
- Holy Trinity Church, Long Melford
- 52°5′15.27″N 0°43′15.67″E
- OS grid reference: TL 865 467
- Location: Long Melford
- Country: England
- Denomination: Church of England
- Website: http://longmelfordchurch.com

History
- Dedication: Holy Trinity

Architecture
- Heritage designation: Grade I listed

Specifications
- Length: 153 feet (47 m)

Administration
- Province: Canterbury
- Diocese: Diocese of St Edmundsbury and Ipswich
- Archdeaconry: Sudbury
- Deanery: Sudbury
- Parish: Long Melford

Clergy
- Rector: The Rev'd. Matthew Lawson

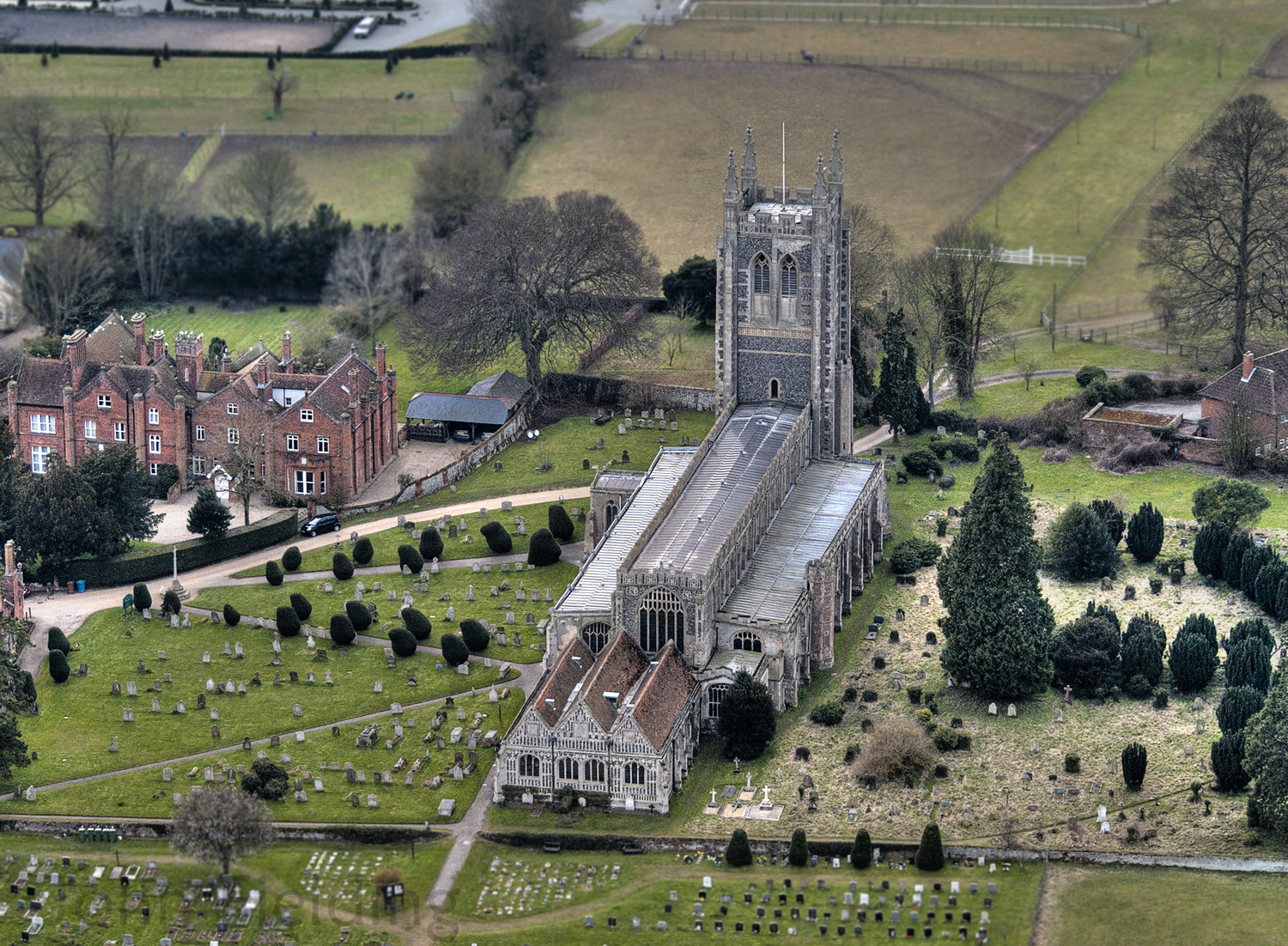
Holy Trinity Church aerial view

The Church of the Holy Trinity is a Grade I listed parish church of the Church of England in Long Melford, Suffolk, England. It is one of 310 medieval English churches dedicated to the Holy Trinity.

The church was constructed between 1467 and 1497 in the late Perpendicular Gothic style. It is a noted example of a Suffolk medieval wool church, founded and financed by wealthy wool merchants in the medieval period as impressive visual statements of their prosperity.

It is chiefly known for its relatively large array of surviving medieval stained glass, described by a leading expert at the Victoria and Albert Museum as a ‘very special and extremely rare collection’.

The church structure is highly regarded by many observers. Its cathedral-like proportions and distinctive style, along with its many original features that survived the religious upheavals of the 16th and 17th centuries, have attracted critical acclaim. Nikolaus Pevsner called it ‘one of the most moving parish churches of England, large, proud and noble’. In Simon Jenkins' England’s Thousand Best Churches, it is one of only 18 churches to be rated with a maximum five stars – and the only one in Suffolk. The church features in many episodes of Michael Wood's BBC television history series Great British Story, filmed during 2011.

== History ==
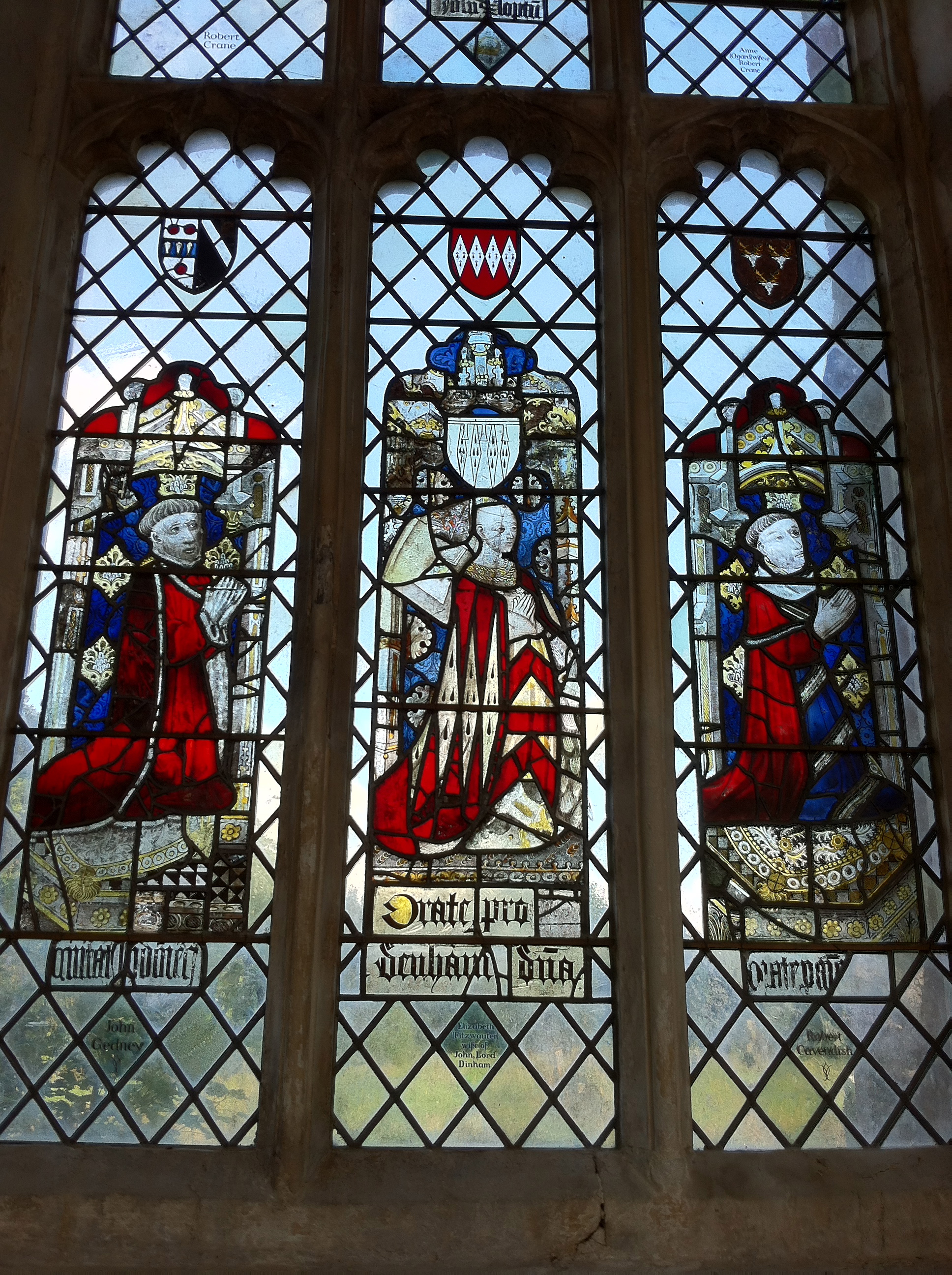
Medieval stained glass window, north aisle.

=== Origins ===
A church is recorded as having been on the site since the reign of King Edward the Confessor (1042–1066). It was originally endowed by the Saxon Earl Alric, who bequeathed the patronage of the church, along with his manor at Melford Hall and about 261 acres of land, to the successive Abbots of the Benedictine Abbey of Bury St Edmund's. There are no surviving descriptions of the original Saxon structure, although the roll of the clergy (see below) and the history of the site extend back to the 12th century.

=== 15th-century reconstruction ===
The church was substantially rebuilt between 1467 and 1497. Of the earlier structures, only the former Lady Chapel (now the Clopton Chantry Chapel) and the nave arcades survive.

The principal benefactor who financed the reconstruction was wealthy local wool merchant John Clopton, who resided at neighbouring Kentwell Hall. Clopton was a supporter of the Lancastrian cause during the Wars of the Roses and in 1462 was imprisoned in the Tower of London with John de Vere, 12th Earl of Oxford and a number of others, charged with corresponding treasonably with Margaret of Anjou. All of those imprisoned were eventually executed except Clopton, who somehow made his peace with his accusers and lived to see the Lancastrians eventually triumphant at the Battle of Bosworth in 1485.

The dates of the reconstruction of the church are derived from contemporary wills, which provided endowments to finance the work.

=== Reconstruction of main tower ===
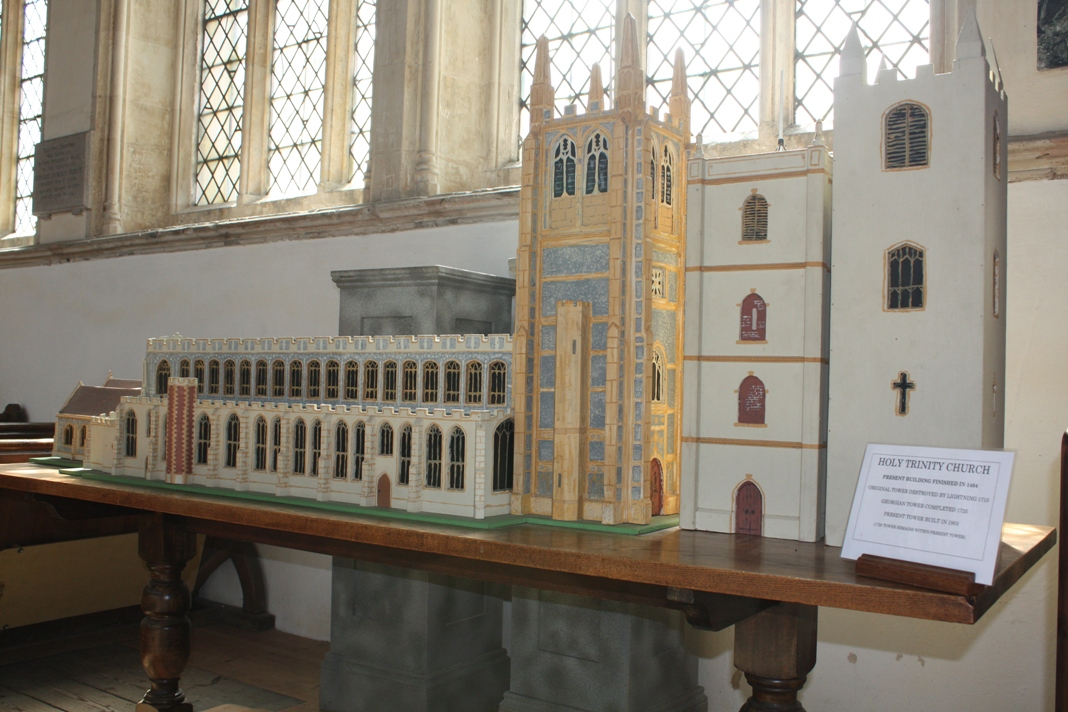
Scale model of the church, showing the successive changes of appearance of the main tower.

In 1710 the main tower was damaged by a lightning strike. It was replaced with a brick-built structure in the 18th century and subsequently remodelled between 1898 and 1903 to its present-day appearance, designed by George Frederick Bodley (Founder of Watts & Co. ) in the Victorian Gothic Revival style. The new tower was closer to its original form with stone and flint facing and the addition of four new pinnacles.

== Description ==
=== Dimensions ===
The dimensions of the church are:

Total length of church and Lady Chapel	245 feet (75 m)
Length of nave	152 feet 6 inches (46.48 m)
Height of nave	41 feet 6 inches (12.65 m)
Length of aisles	135 feet 4 inches (41.25 m)
Height of aisles	24 feet (7.3 m)

=== Nave ===
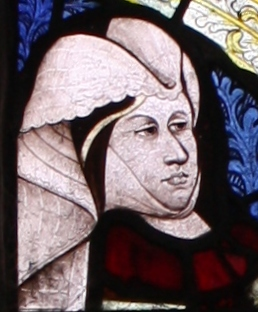
Image of Elizabeth de Mowbray, Duchess of Norfolk in one of the medieval stained glass windows.

The nave, at 152.6 feet (46.5 m), is believed to be the longest of any parish church in England. There are nine bays, of which the first five at the western end are believed to date from an earlier structure.

The interior is lit by 74 tracery windows, many of which retain original medieval glass. These include the image of Elizabeth de Mowbray, Duchess of Norfolk, said to have provided the inspiration for John Tenniel's illustration of the Queen of Hearts in Lewis Carroll's Alice's Adventures in Wonderland.

=== Sanctuary ===
The sanctuary is dominated by the large reredos, of Caen stone and inspired by the works of Albrecht Dürer. It was installed in 1877, having been donated by the mother of the then Rector Charles Martyn.

On the north side is the alabaster and marble tomb of Sir William Cordell who was the first Patron of the Church after the dissolution of the Abbey of Bury St Edmund's in 1539. On either side of the tomb are niches containing figures that represent the four Cardinal virtues of Prudence, Justice, Temperance and Fortitude.

The sanctuary also holds one of the earliest extant alabaster bas relief panels, a nativity from the second half of the 14th century. The panel was hidden under the floor of chancel, probably early in the reign of Elizabeth I, and was rediscovered in the 18th century. The panel, which may be part of an altar piece destroyed during the Reformation, includes a midwife arranging Mary's pillows and two cows looking from under her bed.

=== Clopton Chapel ===
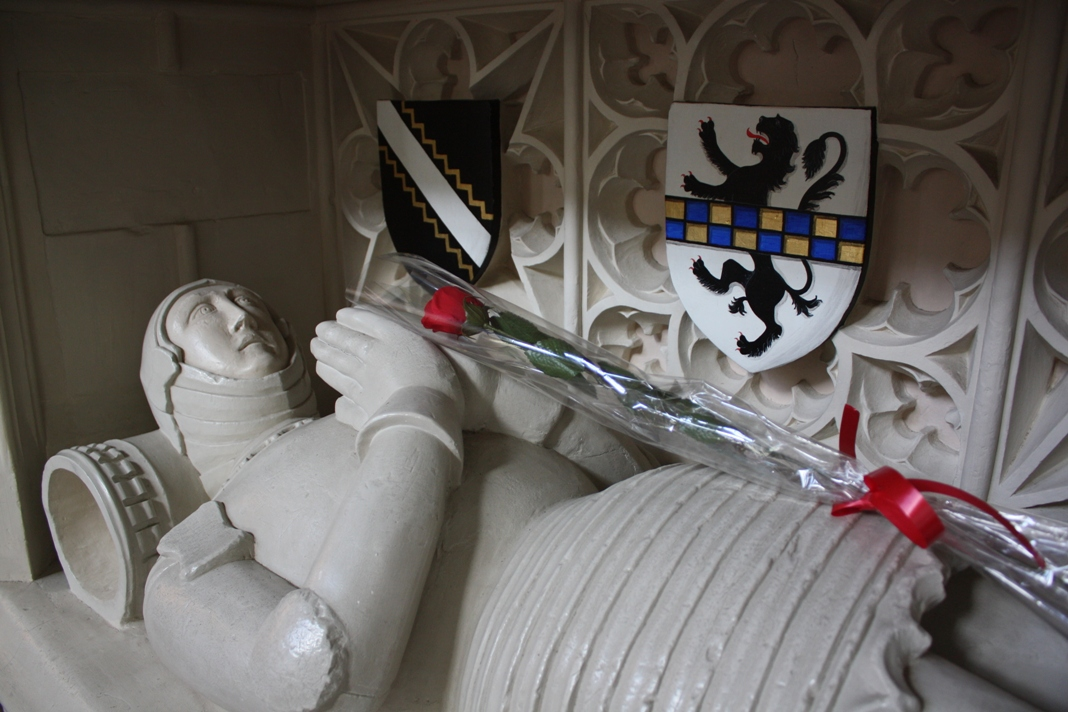
The tomb of Sir William Clopton in the Clopton Chapel. The red rose is the annual rent for Market House, Hadleigh, Suffolk – paid since 1438 and believed to be the oldest continuous rental arrangement in the United Kingdom.

The Clopton Chapel is in the north east corner of the church. It commemorates various Clopton family members and was used by the family as a place of private worship.

The tomb of Sir William Clopton is set into an alcove here, in the north wall. An effigy of Sir William, wearing chain mail and plate armour, is set on top of the tomb. Sir William is known to have died in 1446 and it is therefore believed that this corner of the church predates the late 15th-century reconstruction. There are numerous brasses set in the floor commemorating other members of the Clopton family; two date from 1420, another shows two women wearing head attire in the butterfly style from around 1480, and a third depicts Francis Clopton who died in 1558.

There is an altar set against the east wall of the chapel and a double squint designed to provide priests with a view of the high altar when conducting Masses.

=== Clopton Chantry Chapel ===
The Clopton Chantry Chapel is a small chapel at the far north east corner of the church, accessed from the Clopton Chapel. This was the original Lady Chapel and is the oldest part of the current structure. After John Clopton's death in 1497, his will made provision for the chapel to be extended and refurbished and for him to be buried alongside his wife there. The chapel was then renamed, while the intended Chantry Chapel became the Lady Chapel.

The tomb of John Clopton and his wife is set in the wall leading into the chapel. Inside, the canopy vault displays faded portraits of the couple. Also displayed is a portrait of the risen Christ with a Latin text which, translated, reads Everyone who lives and believes in me shall never die. A series of empty niches in the south wall most likely once held statues of saints. Around the cornice, John Lydgate's poem "Testament" is presented in the form of a scroll along the roof, while his "Lamentation of our Lady Maria" is along the west wall.

=== Lady Chapel ===
The Lady Chapel is a separate building attached to the east end of the main church. In an unusual layout, it has a central sanctuary surrounded by a pillared ambulatory, reflecting its original intended use as a chantry chapel with John Clopton's tomb in its centre. Clopton was forced to abandon this plan when his wife died before the new building was completed and consecrated; so she was buried in the former Lady Chapel and John Clopton was subsequently interred next to her.

The stone carving seen in the Lady Chapel bears similarities to work at King's College Chapel, Cambridge and at Burwell Church in Cambridgeshire. It is known that the master mason employed there was Reginald Ely, the King's Mason, and although there is no documentary proof, it is believed that Ely was also responsible for the work at Holy Trinity, Long Melford.

The chapel was used as a school from 1670 until the early 18th century, and a multiplication table on the east wall serves as a reminder of this use. The steep gables of the roof also date from this period.

=== Martyn Chapel ===
The Martyn Chapel is situated to the south of the chancel. It contains the tombs of several members of the Martyn family, who were prominent local wool merchants in the 15th and 16th centuries, and who also acted as benefactors of the church. These include the tomb chest of Lawrence Martyn (died 1460) and his two wives. On the floor are the tomb slabs of Roger Martyn (died 1615) and his two wives Ursula and Margaret; and of Richard Martyn (died 1624) and his three wives.

Originally, the Martyn chapel contained an altar flanked by two gilded tabernacles, one displaying an image of Christ and the other an image of Our Lady of Pity. These tabernacles reached to the ceiling of the chapel, but were removed or destroyed during the English Reformation in the reign of King Edward VI.

== Organ ==
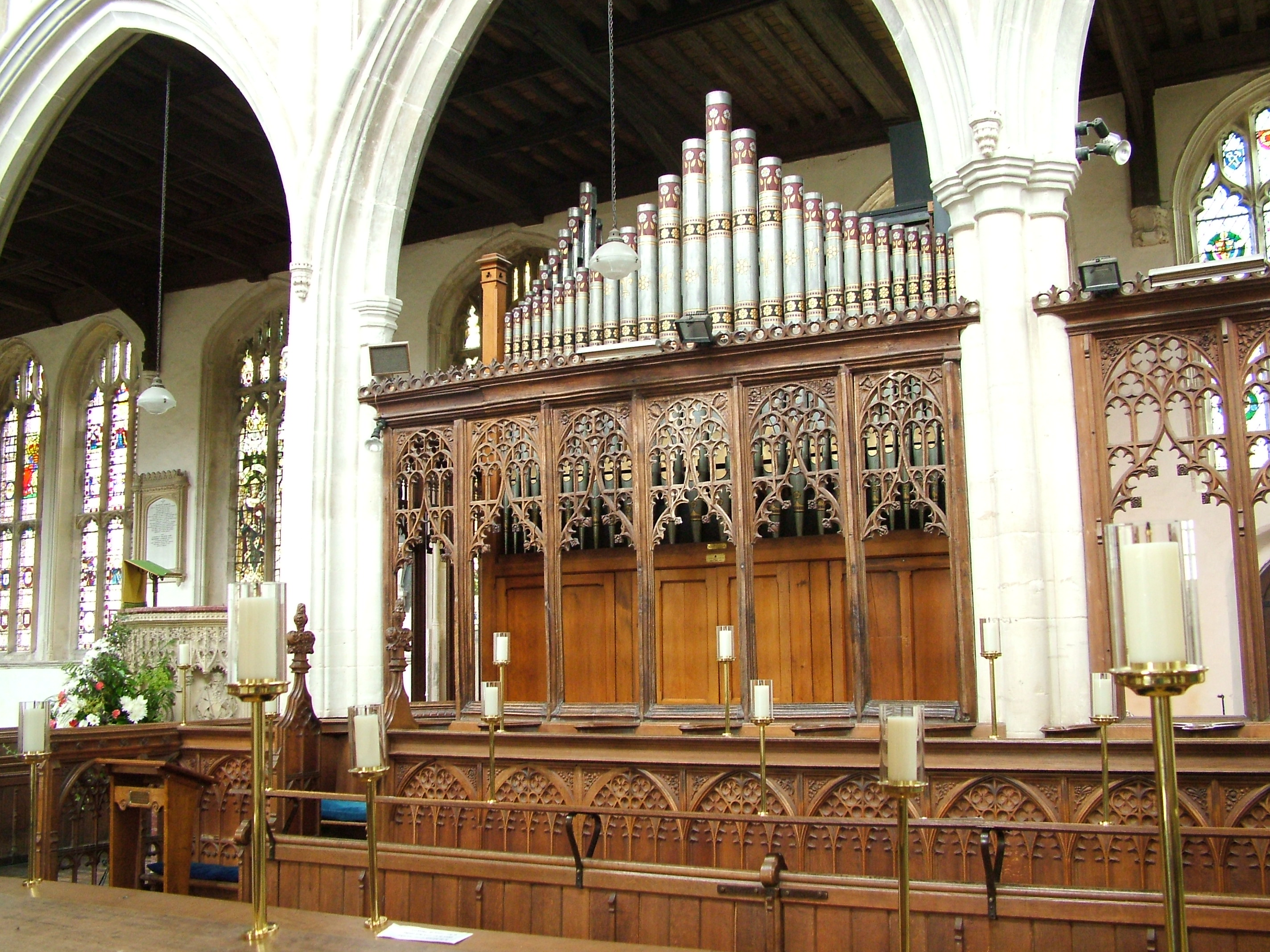
The organ

The church has two pipe organs. The organ in the church is a two manual pipe organ dating from 1867 by J. W. Walker. A specification of this organ can be found on the National Pipe Organ Register.

The organ in the Lady Chapel is a small positive pipe organ. A specification of this organ can be found on the National Pipe Organ Register.

== Glass ==
While most of the country’s medieval stained glass was destroyed in the Reformation and the English Civil War, Long Melford’s glass is a rare survival. The church contains eight medieval windows, including a rare Pieta image of the Virgin Mary, believed to be only one of three of its kind in England. Most of the surviving windows feature what Pevsner called ‘a unique collection of kneeling donors’ – leading figures from public life in the 15th century, including Elizabeth Talbot, Duchess of Norfolk, two lord mayors of London, three royal justices, two knights of the garter and various members of the Clopton family of Kentwell Hall, who were the driving force behind the construction of the church. The medieval glass is attributed to the Norwich School and dates, like the church itself, from the mid- to the late-15th century. Described as "the best collection of medieval glass in Suffolk", it was recollected to its present location, in the north aisle, in the 1960s.

== List of rectors ==
In common with other English churches, for much of its lifetime, the Rector was "presented" (appointed) by the church patron. Until its dissolution in 1539, the patron was the incumbent Abbot of the Benedictine Abbey of Bury St Edmunds; after this date, the patronage was held by a prominent local person, transferring either by bequest or by sale.

The list of rectors of Holy Trinity dates back to the 12th century, but there are gaps prior to 1309.

Dates	Name	Comments
1198 and earlier	Hugh, the Clerk	Rector of Melford before the approbation of part of Melford Church property to the Hospital of St Saviour at Bury.
1199–1200 and after	Walter Hervey	Then known as Vicar of Melford.
1200–1309	(no records)	
10 October 1309	Dominus Simon de Clayber, Priest	Presented by Abbott Thomas de Tottington
5 December 1311	Henry de Stanton	Presented by Abbott Thomas de Tottington
9 October 1312	Dominus Allanus de Ely, Priest	Presented by Abbott Thomas de Tottington
(no date)	Dominus .... de Welbourne	
9 December 1326	Dominus Thomas de Chedworth, Priest	On the resignation of de Welbourne; presented by Abbot Richard de Draughton.
3 April 1333	Magister Simon de Draughton	Presented by Abbot Richard de Draughton.
7 June 1334	Richard de Harlinge, Priest	Presented by Abbot Richard de Draughton.
6 February 1364	Magister Theodorus de Otlania, Priest	Presented by John de Brinkdale, Abbot of St Edmund's.
30 July 1371	Thomas de Grynesby	Presented by John de Brinkdale, Abbot of St Edmund's.
25 August 1410	Magister William Wygor de Cavendish, Priest	On the resignation of Thomas Grynesby; presented by Abbot William Cratfield
1 April 1417	Nicholaus Mansel, Priest	Presented by Brother Robert, Prior of the Monastery of St Edmund of Bury and Brother William of the same Monastery, the Abbot being absent in foreign parts
2 February 1419	Magister Thomas Barnsley, Priest	Presented by William Exeter, Abbot of St Edmund's.
6 December 1429	Stephanus Wilton, in Doctor's orders	On the resignation of Thomas Barnsley; presented by William Curteys, Abbot of St Edmund's.
7 February 1433	Johannes Enachdunensis Episcopus, Venerable Father in God	Presented by William Curteys, Abbot of St Edmund's. This prelate was John, Lord Bishop of Enachdun (now Annaghdown), Ireland.
3 August 1439	Dominus Thomas Lewysham	Presented by William Curteys, Abbot of Bury St Edmund's.
19 July 1441	Thomas Crameworth, Priest	Presented by William Curteys, Abbot of St Edmund's.
5 March 1446	William Hannibald	Presented by William Curteys, Abbot of Bury St Edmund's.
21 June 1454	William Coxe, Bachelor of Laws, Priest	Presented by John Boone, Abbot of Bury St Edmund's.
21 December 1456	John Mydwell	Presented by John Boone, Abbot of Bury St Edmund's.
21 April 1460	Thomas Warden, Professor of Theology	Presented by John Boone, Abbot of Bury St Edmund's.
8 April 1474	Aegidius Dent, Bachelor of Theology	Presented by Richard Hengham, Abbot of Bury St Edmund's.
14 September 1484	Thomas Aleyn, alias Carver, Priest	Presented by Thomas Racclesden, Abbot of Bury St Edmund's.
9 March 1504	William Skern or Skeyne	Presented by William Codenham, Abbot of Bury St Edmund's.
5 March 1514	Magister Robert Stourton, Professor of Theology	Presented by Abbot John Reeve of Bury St Edmund's. Reeve was the last Abbot of Bury – the Abbey was dissolved in 1539.
21 July 1514	Magister Johannes Maltby	Presented by John Reeve, Abbot of Bury St Edmund's.
1534 (approx)	William Newton	Presented by John Reeve, Abbot of Bury St Edmund's.
20 July 1548	Henry Mallet, Clerk	Presented by Princess Mary (later Queen Mary I). Henry Mallet was the Princess Mary's chaplain.
30 March 1558	Magister Christopherus Hill, Bachelor of Theology	Presented by Sir William Cordell, knight, Master of the Court of Chancery of King Philip and Queen Mary and patron of the church. Cordell was a prominent lawyer and politician who lived at neighbouring Melford Hall.
1560 (approx)	Edmund Humphrey	Known to have held his first manor court for the Rectory of Melford on 17 July 1560.
6 February 1583	Ralph Jones, Professor of Theology	Presented by Dame Mary Cordell, widow of Sir William Cordell, the late patron, who had died in 1581.
28 November 1590	Peter Wentworth, Clerk	Presented by Jane Allington, widow, patron of the church in her own right. She was the sister and heiress of Sir William Cordell.
4 September 1599	William Gilbert, Clerk, Master of Arts	On the right of presentation belonging to Queen Elizabeth I. He was chaplain to Gilbert Talbot, 7th Earl of Shrewsbury.
23 September 1618	Robert Wareyn, Clerk, Master of Arts	Presented by Thomas Savage, knight and baron. Wareyn, a Royalist, was turned out of the living in October 1643 at the beginning of the English Civil War. Upon the Restoration of the Monarchy in 1660, he was reinstated, but resigned on 24 November 1660 – he was then 96 years old. He died the following year.
1643–1660	Seth Wood, Samuel Boardman, Ralph Brideoak, Seth Wood, Peter Sainthill, Claudius Salmarius Gilbert	Puritan Ministers – exact dates unknown.
12 November 1660	Nathaniel Bisbie	Presented by Sir Robert Cordell, Bart., on the resignation of Robert Wareyn. In 1689, Bisbie was deprived of the Rectory of Melford for refusing to take the oath of allegiance to King William III.
26 July 1689	Henry Felton, LLD., Fellow of St Peter's College, Cambridge	On the deprivation of Nathaniel Bisbie.
1701	James Johnson	Presented by Sir John Cordell, 3rd Bart.
1741	Abraham Oakes, LL.D.	Presented by Sir Cordell Firebrace, Bart.
1758	John Jacob Oakes	Presented by Sir Cordell Firebrace, Bart. Eldest son of the previous Rector.
1771	Robert Butts	Eldest son of the Bishop of Ely.
1790	John Leroo	On his own presentation, having purchased the advowson two years earlier for £2,400. He insured the life of Robert Butts, the previous incumbent, for this sum; so the living cost him only two years premiums.
1819	Bransby Francis	Presented by the Rev. William Tylney Spurdens.
1830	Edward Cobbold	Presented by his father, John Cobbold. The living was for many years in sequestration because of his debts. He committed suicide in London.
1862	William Wallis, M.A.	Presented by John Chevalier Cobbold, M.P.
1869	Charles John Martyn, M.A., Christchurch, Oxford	On his own presentation, having purchased the advowson.
1892	George St John Topham M.A.	
1902	Frederick Trevor Bamber	
1922–1923	Herbert Reginald Stapylton Bree	
1933–1938	Gordon Bourchier Ince	
1939–1953	Charles Sydney Hardy M.A.	
1955–1960	Fred Stanley Wood Simpson M.A.	
1962–1977	Charles Robert Valentine Herbert	
1978–1999	Christopher John Sansbury M.A.	
2001–2014	Ian M. G. Friars	
2015–Present	Matthew Lawson	

== Parish status ==
The Parish of Long Melford is part of the Chadbrook Benefice. The other churches in the group are:

- St George's Church, Shimplingthorne
- St Peter and St Paul's Church, Alpheton
- St Catherine's Church, Long Melford

== See also ==
- Three hares
