= John Clopton (died 1497) =

John Clopton (1423–1497) was the sheriff of Suffolk and Norfolk and a member of John de Vere, 12th Earl of Oxford’s ill-fated conspiracy against Edward IV. Clopton was the only conspirator to receive a pardon and escape with his life. He was the principal benefactor of Holy Trinity Church, Long Melford, described by Sir Nikolaus Pevsner as ‘one of the most moving parish churches of England’.

== Life ==
Clopton was born in 1423, the son of Sir William Clopton, the most important member of the gentry in the prosperous wool town of Long Melford, Suffolk, and his second wife Margery Francis. Sir William had inherited the family seat of Kentwell Hall from his mother, Katherine Mylde.

As a young man, John Clopton trained as a lawyer at the Inns of Court in London and was a member of the Inner Temple. He was sheriff of Suffolk and Norfolk (1451-2), a justice of the peace in the eastern counties through four successive reigns, and a member of many royal commissions dealing with subjects as varied as the raising or armies and fleets, combating piracy, investigating felonies, murders and treason, and the taxing of aliens. His final appointment as justice of the peace came in February 1497, in the year of his death, when he was 74 years old.

== Arrest for treason ==
In 1461 he was arrested along with his close friend and neighbour John de Vere, 12th Earl of Oxford on charges of conspiring with the exiled Margaret of Anjou to restore her husband Henry VI to the throne. Also arrested were De Vere's son Aubrey, Sir Thomas Tuddenham, and Clopton's brothers-in-law Sir John Montgomery and Sir William Tyrrell. It is likely the group were plotting to help Henry Beaufort, 3rd Duke of Somerset, then in Bruges, to land with an army in Essex; they seem to have been betrayed by a messenger carrying a letter from De Vere to the exiled queen.

All six men were held at the Tower of London before being arraigned before John Tiptoft, Edward IV's newly appointed Lord High Constable. The De Veres, Tuddenham, Montgomery and Tyrrell were found guilty and executed on Tower Hill in February 1462. Only Clopton was spared. He was later pardoned.

== Building the church ==
Returning to Long Melford, Clopton set about organising the reconstruction of Holy Trinity Church, adding a new north and south aisle and rebuilding the chancel and nave. Clopton was the fundraiser and chief benefactor, which has been widely interpreted as an offering of thanks for his life being spared. The stained glass windows in the new church included portraits of donors and other distinguished connections of Clopton's. These survived the widespread destruction of religious images in the Reformation and Civil War, representing what Simon Jenkins in his book England's Thousand Best Churches calls "a rollcall of kneeling donors and associated saints and heraldry, God and mammon in magnificent unison".

Clopton saw his church completed in 1496 but died the following year. He was buried next to the high altar, the most prestigious position in the church.

== Family ==
Clopton married Alice Darcy, daughter of Robert Darcy, the member of parliament for Essex. They were said to have had sixteen children. Of these, their son William inherited the Kentwell estate. Clopton's daughter Ann married Sir Thomas Rokewode.

Alice Darcy's sister Anne married John Montgomery (c.1426–1462) and her sister Elinor married William Tyrrell, which made Montgomery and Tyrrell – co-conspirators arrested and condemned by Tiptoft – Clopton's brothers-in-laws.

Political offices
Preceded by John Jermyn	Sheriff of Norfolk and Suffolk; 1451–1452	Succeeded by Thomas Sharnebourne
Preceded by John Wingfield	Sheriff of Norfolk and Suffolk; 1455–1456	Succeeded by Richard Bothe
