= Long Melford =

Village in Suffolk, England

Coordinates: 52.077°N 0.718°E

- Village and civil parish
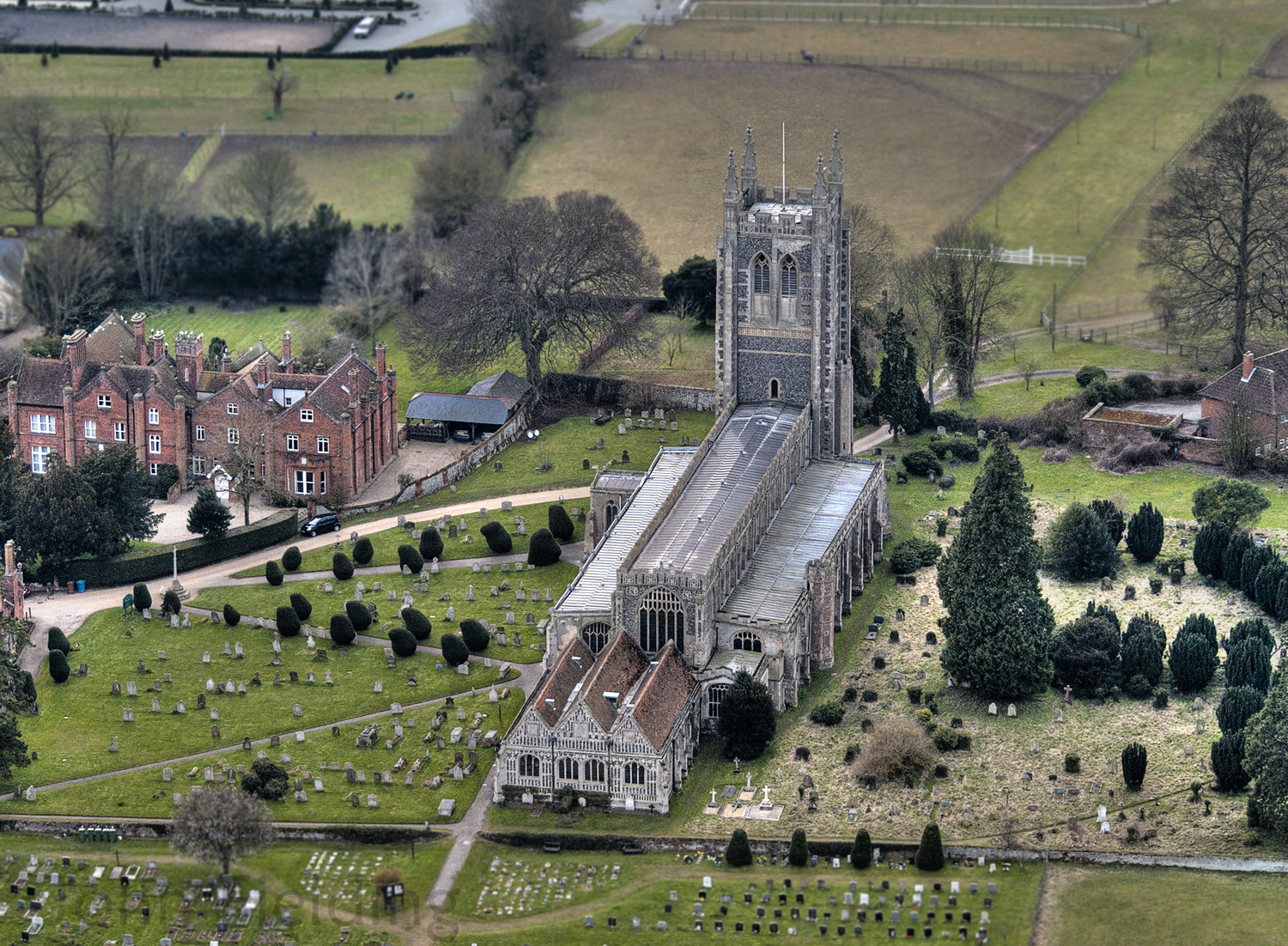
- Holy Trinity Church

- Location within Suffolk
- Area: 21.95 km^{2} (8.47 sq mi)
- Population: 3,918 (2011)
  - Density: 178/km^{2} (460/sq mi)
- OS grid reference: TL8646
- Civil parish: Long Melford
- District: Babergh
- Shire county: Suffolk
- Region: East
- Country: England
- Sovereign state: United Kingdom
- Post town: Sudbury
- Postcode district: CO10
- Dialling code: 01787
- Police: Suffolk
- Fire: Suffolk
- Ambulance: East of England
- UK Parliament: South Suffolk

Long Melford, colloquially and historically also referred to as Melford, is a large village and civil parish in the Babergh district, in the county of Suffolk, England. It is on Suffolk's border with Essex, which is marked by the River Stour, 3 miles (4.8 km) from Sudbury, approximately 16 miles (26 km) from Colchester and 14 miles (23 km) from Bury St Edmunds. It is one of Suffolk's "wool towns" and is a former market town. The parish also includes the hamlets of Bridge Street and Cuckoo Tye. In 2011 the parish had a population of 3918.

Its name is derived from the nature of the village's layout (originally concentrated along a 3-mile stretch of a single road) and the Mill ford crossing the Chad Brook (a tributary of the River Stour).

== History ==
Prehistoric finds discovered in 2011 have shown that early settlement of what is now known as Long Melford dates back to the Mesolithic period, up to 8300 BC. In addition, Iron Age finds were made in the same year, all within the largely central area of the current village.

The Romans constructed two Roman roads through Long Melford, the main one running from Chelmsford to Pakenham. Roman remains were discovered in a gravel pit in 1828, a site now occupied by the village's football club. In 1997, Roman finds were uncovered including complete skeletons (with one being in a stone coffin), part of the original Roman Road, and complete samian ware pottery in a villager's garden.

In June 2013, some archaeological evidence of a Saxon and Bronze Age settlement in the northern area of the village was discovered by Carenza Lewis and her team from Cambridge University during a student dig.

=== Middle Ages ===
The Manor of Melford was given to the Abbey of St Edmundsbury by Earl Alfric about 1050. The village is recorded in the Domesday Book of 1086, which lists the manor of Long Melford as having 41 villagers, including two freemen, nineteen smallholders, and sixteen slaves. There were eight plough teams of the lord of the manor and seventeen others. The manor had both meadow and woodland, two mills, and one church. The livestock was three cobs, thirty cattle, 140 pigs, and 300 sheep. The neighbouring Manor of Kentwell is also recorded.

During the Middle Ages, the village grew and gained a weekly market and an annual fair in 1235.

Long Melford survived the Black Death in 1348-9, and was a brief stop-off in the Peasants' Revolt in 1381. By the early 15th century, the manor of Kentwell belonged to the Clopton family. John Clopton was arrested in 1461 and charged with treason. He was spared execution, released and returned to Kentwell. There he organised and largely helped to pay for the rebuilding of the parish church, a notable example of a wool church. During this time the wealth of the parish was increasing, with most of the inhabitants being free men, renting their homes and lands. Guilds were founded, and weaving cloth became a key part of the village's economy. In the official inspector's returns for the year 1446, there were as many as 30 named weavers in Long Melford, who between them produced 264 finished "cloths".

Following the Dissolution of the Monasteries, Henry VIII granted the manor to Sir William Cordell.

=== Modern era ===
In 1604, an epidemic of the plague arrived in Melford and 119 people died between the months of May and September. During the English Civil War, a Puritan mob of over one thousand arrived in Melford pursuing Elizabeth Savage, Countess Rivers, a staunch Catholic and Royalist, from her property in St Osyth to her Suffolk estate at Melford Hall. The hall was sacked and plundered and the Countess fled to Bury St Edmunds, then to London where eventually she was imprisoned for debt and died a pauper.

By the end of the 17th century, cloth production had once again become important in the area as many new entrepreneurs started to produce a range of materials known as 'Bays and Says', similar to baize and serge. These were lighter, cheaper types of cloth than the traditional woollen broadcloths that had been made in the 15th and 16th centuries but, once again, many of the cloth merchants became extremely wealthy and for some years prosperity returned to Melford.

Soon after the beginning of the 19th century, a range of new industries such as horsehair weaving, an iron foundry, a flax works and coconut matting production started in Melford. By 1851, there were three horsehair manufacturers in Melford employing over 200 men, women and children. Prince Bertie, who later became King Edward VII, together with Princess Alexandra visited the village in November 1865, and large archways were constructed at key points in their honour to welcome them in, with the crowds. During the 1880s, a series of wage cuts in the coconut industry caused widespread anger and eventually resulted in strike action. Feelings ran high, culminating in a riot breaking out on polling day in December 1885, during which considerable damage was caused throughout the village. Troops were summoned from Bury St Edmunds to restore order; they arrived by train and marched from Melford station to read the Riot Act from the steps of the Police Station.

In World War I, hundreds of village men volunteered to serve their country. They joined many diverse army regiments, such as the Scots Guards, Prince of Wales Regiment, Royal Engineers, the Suffolk Regiment, serving in Gallipoli, Ypres, the Somme and numerous military campaigns. Other men fought in the Royal Navy, and the newly formed Royal Flying Corps. The personal stories of these 1,100 men and how the war affected the village is found in Long Melford and the Great War – The Stories of a Thousand Lives by David Gevaux. In October 1920, the village war memorial was unveiled, and is located at the entrance of the Holy Trinity Church.

During World War II, Long Melford was a location for American and Allied service personnel, who flew B24 and B17 aircraft from two large bomber stations, RAF Lavenham and RAF Sudbury, located nearby. Troops from, amongst others, the Berkshire and Black Watch Regiments, were billeted and garrisoned within the village. Injured airmen, troops from the D-Day landings and prisoners of war were treated at the large nearby 136th Station Hospital, located between Long Melford and Acton. Band leader Glenn Miller and his orchestra briefly visited Long Melford and played to injured airmen, invited locals and hospital staff at the 136th hospital in 1944.

German prisoners of war were interned at a camp near the 136th Station Hospital, and Italian prisoners were located at a camp at the nearby village of Borley. USAF personnel from bases at Lakenheath, Mildenhall, and Wethersfield airbases often lived within Long Melford. By the end of the war, two B24 Liberators, one B17 Flying Fortress and one RAF de Havilland Mosquito had crashed in the parish with over twenty persons killed or injured. Numerous pillboxes and temporary gun emplacements were constructed in the village during the war, and in 2012 a previously unknown underground bunker room was located. According to the Remembrance Plaque at Holy Trinity Church, ninety-six serving villagers were killed in World War One, and eleven during World War Two.

Today the hamlet of Rodbridge in Long Melford is the home of the Nethergate Brewery.

== Notable buildings ==
=== The Church ===
The size and architecture of Holy Trinity Church makes it unusual for a village parish church, and it was the only church in Suffolk to receive five stars in the book England's Thousand Best Churches by Simon Jenkins. The church dates from the reign of Edward the Confessor, but was then substantially rebuilt between 1467 and 1497 by John Clopton of Kentwell Hall. It is one of the richest "wool churches" in East Anglia and is noted for its flushwork, Clopton chantry chapel, and the Lady Chapel at the east end, as well as having one of the finest collections of medieval stained-glass of any village church in England. Edmund Blunden, the First World War poet, is buried in the churchyard. Next to the church is the Hospital of the Holy and Blessed Trinity, an almshouse founded by William Cordell in 1573 and restored in 1847.

=== Other notable buildings ===
The village contains two country houses, Kentwell Hall and Melford Hall, both visited in the 16th century by Elizabeth I, and all built from the proceeds of the wool trade in the Middle Ages. Kentwell Hall and Holy Trinity Church were financed by the Clopton family, in particular by John Clopton. Both Kentwell Hall and Melford Hall are open to the general public, with Melford Hall being a National Trust property.

The village has 100 listed buildings, including many of the inns that were built along its main street. The village's history is recorded in the Long Melford Heritage Centre, which contains finds uncovered in the July 2011 Long Melford Dig. There are also displays of old photographs, and ancient finds from the village, including a collection of locally found Roman artefacts.

== Governance ==
Long Melford has three tiers of local authority governance; Long Melford Parish Council, Babergh District Council, and Suffolk County Council. An electoral ward in the same name exists. This ward includes Alpheton and has a total population at the 2011 Census of 3,774.

== Education ==
The village contains one school, Long Melford Church of England Primary School. Opened in 1974, it has been part of St Edmundsbury and Ipswich Diocesan Multi Academy Trust since 2016. The village's previous school was built in 1860, in the Elizabethan style, enlarged in 1895 and is now a community centre.

== Transport ==
Long Melford once had a railway station on the Stour Valley Line, but this closed in March 1967 when the line was cut back to Sudbury. It is connected to several large towns by bus, notably Sudbury, Colchester, Bury St Edmunds, Haverhill and Ipswich.

== Sport and leisure ==
Long Melford has a Non-League football club, Long Melford F.C., which plays at the Stoneylands ground, just off St Catherine's Road. They are members of the Eastern Counties League Premier Division following promotion as champions of Division One in the 2014/15 season.

Until the 1980s a prominent feature of the village's large, elongated village green was a group of great elms that included one of the largest in England. These trees were included in a 1940 painting by the watercolourist S. R. Badmin in his picture 'Long Melford Green on a Frosty Morning', now in the Victoria and Albert Museum.

Long Melford has a large water meadow on the approach to Liston and a network of footpaths. Among these paths is the Melford Walk, which follows the route of the disused railway line before joining the Valley Walk path to Sudbury. The Suffolk Cycle Route also passes through the village. Located at the southern end of the village next to the River Stour at Rodbridge Corner is Long Melford Country Park. This was formed by gravel excavations for nearby airfields during the second world war, leaving some large, attractive lakes with wildlife habitats and walking areas for visitors.

The Long Melford Big Night Out Guy Fawkes Night fireworks event is held annually in November at Melford Hall.

== In popular culture ==
Long Melford was visited by Daniel Defoe, who mentioned the village in his book A tour thro' the whole island of Great Britain. Defoe wrote, "Near adjoining to it [Sudbury] is a village call'd Long-Melfort, and a very long one it is, from which I suppose it had that addition to its name; it is full of very good houses, and, as they told me, is richer, and has more wealthy masters of the manufacture in it, than in Sudbury itself."

Between 1962 and 1967 Peter Pears and Benjamin Britten organised a series of Bach Weekends at Holy Trinity Church, with guests including the English Chamber Orchestra. A performance of Christmas Oratorio from 1967 was recorded for BBC Television.

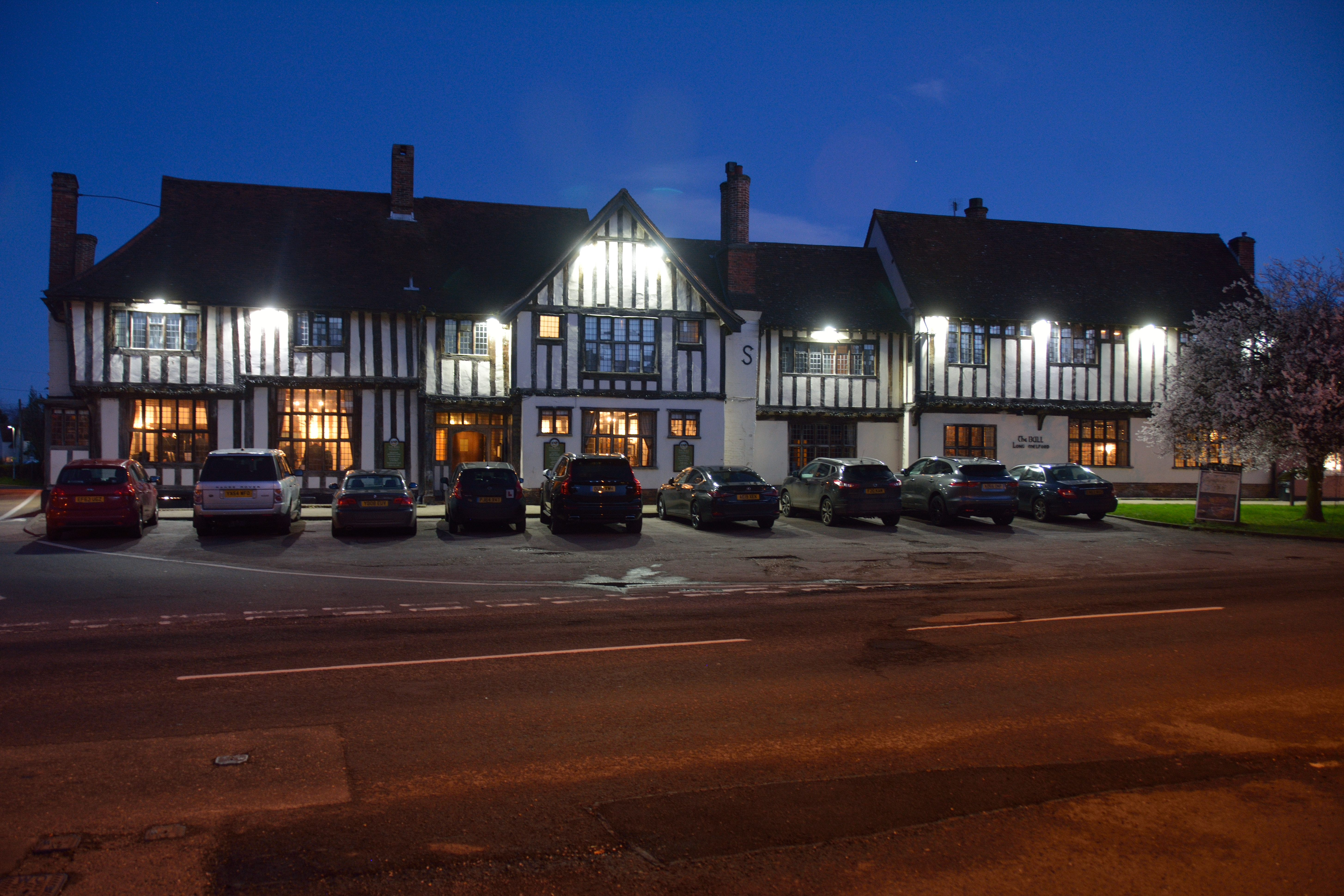
The Bull Hotel in Long Melford

The Bull Hotel in Long Melford features in the BBC documentary The World of John and Yoko. Melford village, and many of the buildings surrounding it were used as settings for the BBC television series Lovejoy. The 1968 film Witch Finder General and Terry Jones's film Wind in the Willows were both partially shot in Long Melford. The frontage of Kentwell Hall was digitally added into the 2005 film, The Chronicles of Narnia. The Long Melford Dig was filmed and documented in Michael Wood's 2012 BBC series The Great British Story. In early July 2014, Kentwell Hall was used as a location for the filming of Tulip Fever.

Long Melford was rated by a Times article in September 2015, as being one of the Top Ten most desirable villages in Britain.

== Notable residents ==
- John Reeve (1479–1540), the last abbot of Bury St Edmunds, was born in Melford.
- Sir Roger Martyn, Lord Mayor of London in 1567, was born here.
- The World War I poet Edmund Blunden lived, and is buried, in Long Melford.
- The opera singer Mignon Nevada died here
- Racing driver Richard Seaman lived at Kentwell Hall during part of his childhood.
- Nevill Cobbold, the England player who was one of football's greatest figures in the Victorian era, was born in the village and began his career at Long Melford FC.
- Henry Wickham Steed, editor of The Times, was born here.
- The notorious 17th century witch-hunter John Stearne, one of the two main instigators of the Bury St Edmunds witch trials, grew up in Long Melford.
- The woodgraver and watercolourist Lady Mabel Annesley retired to Long Melford in 1953 and is buried in the village.
- The lawyer and Liberal Democrat peer Andrew Phillips, Baron Phillips of Sudbury, was born in Long Melford.
- The classicist and orientalist Professor H W F Saggs died here in 2005.
- Harold Atcherley, the businessman and prisoner of war survivor lived in the village.
- Anne Cullen, the actress who originated the part of Carol Tregorran in the radio soap The Archers, lived in Long Melford until her death in 2015.
- Charles John Drew was murdered by his namesake son in his house on the high street in 1740.

== Bibliography ==
- Ambrose, Ernest; Melford Memories. Recollections of 94 Years (LM Historical & Archaeological Society, 1972), reprinted 2013
- Blunden, Edmund; The Great Church of the Holy Trinity, Long Melford (W.S. Cowell, 1966) - illus. John Piper
- Cole, Kate J.; Sudbury, Long Melford and Lavenham through Time (Amberley, 2015)
- Garnett, Oliver; Melford Hall. National Trust Guide (National Trust, 2005)
- Goyder, Rosemary et al.; A Sermon in Stone: the 500th Anniversary Book of Long Melford Church (Lavenham Press, 1983)
- Paine, Clive; Sudbury, Lavenham and Melford: Photographic Memories (Francis Frith Co., 2005)
- Parker, Sir William; Hand-Book to the Ancient Painted Glass, in the Church of the Holy Trinity, Long Melford, Suffolk (Pawsey & Hayes, 1888)
- Parker, Sir William; The History of Long Melford (Wyman & Sons, 1873)
- Wall, Barry L.; Long Melford through the Ages: A Guide to the Buildings and the Streets (East Anglian Magazine, 1986)
- Wigmore, Elizabeth (ed.); Long Melford: the last 2000 years (LM Historical & Archaeological Society, 2000)
