= The Great British Story: A People's History =

- Genre: Documentary
- Written by: Michael Wood
- Presented by: Michael Wood
- Narrated by: Michael Wood
- Composer: Howard Davidson
- Country of origin: United Kingdom
- Original language: English
- No. of series: 1
- No. of episodes: 8

Production
- Executive producer: Cassian Harrison
- Producer: Rebecca Dodds (series producer); Sally Thomas
- Production locations: Long Melford, Sudbury, Lavenham, Kibworth, and many other UK locations
- Camera setup: Peter Harvey and Jeremy Jeffs
- Running time: 55-60 mins
- Production company: Maya Vision International for BBC

Original release
- Network: BBC
- Release: 25 May – 10 August 2012

The Great British Story: A People's History is a 2012 documentary in eight parts written and presented by Michael Wood looking at history through the eyes of ordinary people airing on the BBC.

== Episode one: Britannia ==
This episode deals with the period in Britain from the fall of Rome when in the early fifth-century towns were abandoned but the Roman lifestyle continued especially in Wales and the north and when early Christian saints, Patrick, Columba, and Mungo began to establish churches in the north from which modern settlements grew. Anglo-Saxons from Denmark and Germany began to arrive in large numbers in the east, having under the Romans been only labourers, to establish the English. More Christian missionaries arrived from Rome and by the time of Bede who recorded there were five languages in the land; British (Welsh), Scottish (Irish), Pictish, Latin and English. The village and people of Long Melford, in Suffolk, and their dig of nearly forty test pits, was featured during the first four episodes. Michael Wood and Carenza Lewis filmed, discussed, and analysed finds, which included numerous Roman artefacts, including pottery, and even part of a Roman road was discovered, during filming in July 2011. The Melford Parish Council was featured in the programme, as was the annual Street Fair celebration, and a Roman Spatha sword, found in a villager's garden.

First broadcast 25 May 2012

UK Viewing figures: 1.66 Million

== Episode two: Tribes to Nations ==
Bede having identified the four peoples of Britain in hundreds of different tribes. Britons to the west, Picts to the North, Scots from Ulster now in western Scotland and in the south English from the Anglo Saxons. The Anglo Saxons were making laws based on monetary compensation for injury. With no cities monasteries became the hub of Arts and Crafts as British and Anglo Saxon culture with Roman ideas became the centre of western European civilization. Vikings began terrorising Britain in the ninth century settling in Ireland and northern Briton when population growth and politics in their own lands forced them to move. With the creation of the Danelaw and a capital at York Britain was divided. Southern Britain became a stronghold of the English as the Anglo Saxon tribes came together and the old Roman cities were restored from London to Exeter to become centres of defence and administration. In Wales and Scotland tribes also joined to combat the Vikings. The Vikings within a generation had become Christian. Laws of the land became based on Christian values with books such as the Textus Roffensis.

First broadcast 1 June 2012

UK viewing figures: 1.29 million

== Episode three: The Norman Yoke ==
11th century England was one of the wealthiest countries in Europe. This made it ripe for conquest by the Normans who wiped out almost all English nobility, thus forcing the ordinary people under the control of French speaking Barons. They maintained rule from hundreds of Motte-and-bailey castles making no attempt to mix with the English for three or four generations. Under this new rule England prospered, trading from new cities such as Bristol that traded in everything, including sending Welsh and English slaves to moorish Spain. Bristol was used as the starting point to invade southern Wales and later Ireland. By 1214 the oppression of the king led to unrest by the ordinary people reflected by their Barons who had become more English than Norman that they forced the King to sign Magna Carta which secured rights based on Anglo-Saxon laws for freemen who in feudal England were an elite minority. The episode ends with the beginning of democracy in England with the short lived rise of Simon de Montfort, an Anglo-Norman nobleman, who led the barons' rebellion against King Henry III during the Second Barons' War of 1263–4.

First broadcast 8 June 2012

UK viewing figures: 1.50 million

== Episode four: The Great Rising ==
14th century Britain saw the arrival of Black Death in 1348 killing nearly half of the estimated six million population of England in just 500 days. This depletion of the population meant the survivors could command better wages and working conditions and more movement of the population. The government fighting foreign wars introduced a poll tax of three groats levied on every citizen, rich and poor. Wat Tyler was one of the leaders of the Peasants' Revolt which sprang up all over England culminating in the rebels attacking London killing the Chief Justice and the Chancellor. Fourteen-year-old Richard II agreed to meet the rebels at Smithfield, London and agreed to their demands but Wat Tyler was killed by the Lord Mayor of London and the rebels dispersed and the leaders hunted down. Despite the failure of the revolt a new class of serf, the farmer, emerged who rented land. Education with the advent of cheap paper made England one of the most literate countries with schools being built all over the country. The cloth trade made England rich.

First broadcast 15 June 2012

UK viewing figures: 1.23 million

== Episode five: Lost Worlds and New Worlds ==
16th Century Britain consisted of three kingdoms, four nations (five if the Cornish are included), three parliaments in London, Edinburgh, and Dublin but only one religion the Catholic Church. The Catholic Church had been coming under pressure during the previous hundred years from the Lollards led by John Wycliffe and Henry VIII in debt and in dispute with the Pope over his divorce initiated the reformation in Britain replacing the Pope with himself as Head of the Church of England. The sale and dissolution of the monasteries led to a new class "The Capitalist" ready to exploit the recently discovered New World. Protestantism came with his son Edward VI and his daughter Elizabeth I. Scotland became an even stronger bastion of Protestantism whereas Ireland never did leading to disputes to this day. The removal of catholic idolatry still did not satisfy some groups leading to the rise of the Puritan with no Bishops or King.

First broadcast 20 July 2012

UK viewing figures: 1.41 million

== Episode six: The Age of Revolution ==
17th century and Elizabeth I died, James VI of Scotland was invited to be monarch of a new Great Britain with the first Union Flag created. All was well until Charles I came to the throne and religious tensions between Catholic and Protestant rose again. In Ireland Scottish Protestants who had been settling in Ulster, where the original Scoti had come from in the Dark Ages, led to a revolt by Irish Catholics and the creation of an Irish Confederacy that lasted 10 years. Charles asked parliament for money to fight the Irish and events led to the Civil War which divided the whole of Britain and Ireland culminating in the death of the King and Oliver Cromwell and parliament subduing dissidents in Ireland, Scotland, and Cornwall. Fledgling political groups Levellers, and Diggers met with Cromwell to discuss democratic ways often based on Bible scriptures known as the Putney Debates. The century came to a close not with a democracy but a Parliamentary state and a restored monarchy with restrained powers and an Anglican rather than a Protestant church.

First broadcast 27 July 2012

== Episode seven: Industry and Empire ==
18th century Britain, mechanisation and mass production, developed out of the old industries, came the perfect convergence of ideas and industry with a skilled and adaptable workforce. Cottage workshops often with child labour made items like chains. Two-thirds of British slaving ships were registered in Liverpool, a new city of world trade. British sea power enabled private companies like the East India Company to establish a trading empire. Private companies built 4000 miles of canal in Britain. In Scotland the Highland Clearances led to emigration to industrial Scotland, Australia, and the Americas. The Lunar Society of Birmingham, scientists, inventors, and thinkers from people of all classes was formed.

Poverty in the 19th century countryside led to unrest and the Swing Riots across Britain and the Tolpuddle Martyrs led to the formation of the first union. In the cities the Peterloo Massacre led to some reforms. Frederich Engels and Karl Marx amassed data and statistics in Manchester expecting the working people to rise up. They did not in part due to local government and the civic responsibilities that lifted the poor out of chronic poverty. Rising industrial powers in Europe and America caused another economic depression in the 1870s led to another wave of emigration.

First broadcast 3 August 2012

== Episode eight: Modern Britain ==
20th century and Britain as the first industrial nation was the first under increasing world competition to begin deindustrialising with closures of ship yards and other heavy industries leading to strikes and unrest from women such as Mary Macarthur who led the chainmakers strike. The First World War and Britain lost a million men and no part of the country was left untouched and huge war debts and unemployment led to the depression. The Second World War contributed to further decline as the empire began to break up through the 1950s and 1960s. A shortage of labour led to an influx of half a million migrants from the Caribbean and Africa. A multicultural society began to grow that in the old lands of Scotland, Wales, and Cornwall a revival of old languages has been rekindled. Wood speculates that it has been Britain's ability to change and embrace modern technologies that will enable the British people to move forward.

First broadcast 10 August 2012
