= Kentwell Hall =

Stately home located in Long Melford, Suffolk, England

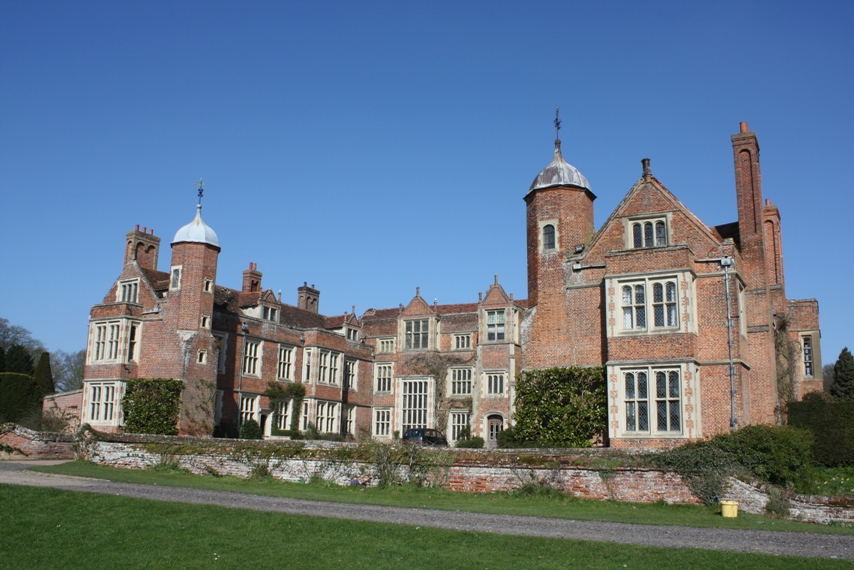
- South facade of Kentwell Hall
- Interactive map of the Kentwell Hall area

General information
- Architectural style: English perpendicular
- Location: Long Melford, Suffolk, England
- Coordinates: 52.098306°N 0.718516°E
- Construction started: 15th century

Kentwell Hall is a stately home in Long Melford, Suffolk, England. It includes the hall, outbuildings, a rare-breeds farm and gardens. Most of the current building facade dates from the mid-16th century, but the origins of Kentwell are much earlier, with references in the Domesday Book of 1086.

Kentwell has been the background location for numerous film and television productions, and, since 1979, has annually been the scene of Tudor and other period historical re-enactments, with weddings and other events. It also hosts Scaresville, an annual Hallowe'en event which won national awards in 2009 and 2018.

== History ==
=== Early history ===
The earliest recorded reference to Kentwell is in the Domesday Book of 1086, which states that the manor of Kentwell (along with six others) formed part of the property of Frodo, brother of Abbot Baldwin, of the Abbey of St. Edmund's.

At that time, the manor was called by its old English name of Kanewella. The record in the Domesday Book survey, translated from the original Latin, reads:

"In the time of King Edward the Confessor, Algar held Kanewella under Seward, a freeman of Meldon, as a manor containing two carucates of land with Soke. There were thereon at that time 7 villeins, and afterwards, and now 4 velleins. There was then, and subsequently, 1 bordar; now there are 3. There were always 2 ploughs belonging to the demesne. There were then and afterwards 2 ploughs belonging to the Homagers of the manor; there now remains 1. There are 8 acres of mowing meadow. There has always been 1 horse at the Manor house. There were then 5 working oxen; there are now 8. At that time there were 30 swine; there are now 40. Then 80 sheep, now there are 50. At that time and subsequently, this manor was worth 40 shillings; it is now worth £4."

Frodo is known to have left at least two sons, Alan and Gilbert, but the documented history of Kentwell is somewhat sparse for the next 300 years. An interpretation of papal tithe records suggests that Kentwell was owned by a person called Galleus from 1145 to 1148; and there are references in Church papers to a "De Kentewell" family, including one Sir Gilbert de Kentewell, in the 13th century.

Between the years 1252 and 1272, Kentwell Manor appears to have been granted by King Henry III to Sir William de Valence, who was killed in battle in France in 1296. Kentwell passed to his niece, who married David Strabolgie, Earl of Athol; in 1333 he in turn conveyed the manor to Sir Robert Gower and his heirs. Kentwell passed to Sir Robert Gower's daughter and afterwards, in 1368, to John Gower, poet, a personal friend of Geoffrey Chaucer.

In 1373 Kentwell was acquired by Sir John Cobham and soon afterwards passed to the ownership of the Mylde family.

=== Clopton family period ===
Successive generations of Cloptons occupied Kentwell Hall from c1375 when Sir Thomas Clopton married Katherine Mylde, daughter of William Mylde of Clare, Suffolk, then the owner of the estate. The estate, then named Lutons, is included in the will of this Sir Thomas Clopton, dated 8 March 1382. Clopton died the following year. The Cloptons were a respected local family with some family members becoming distinguished nationally in the 15th and 16th centuries. The family is named in the Domesday Book of 1086 as feudatories of the Honor of Clare and various members of the "de Clopton" family appear in church and Abbey records over the following 200 years. The Clopton family transformed the manor into its current recognisable form. Successive members of the family remained at Kentwell until 1661, when the last resident Clopton died there.

Constant mention is made of "the Hall" or "the Place of Lutons" in wills and documents of successive Cloptons until 1563, at which point the first references are made to "the new mansion-house of Kentwell Hall". From the evidence of historical records, and from present day evidence, there is a presumption that the Lutons Manor House was located in woodland known as the Pond Plantation, about a quarter-mile north west of the current site. There are references in contemporary records to "Lutons House, near to the Ponds in the Park, where there was a little chapel of Saint Anne". The Chapel of Saint Anne is depicted in maps of the Pond Plantation as late as the 19th century.

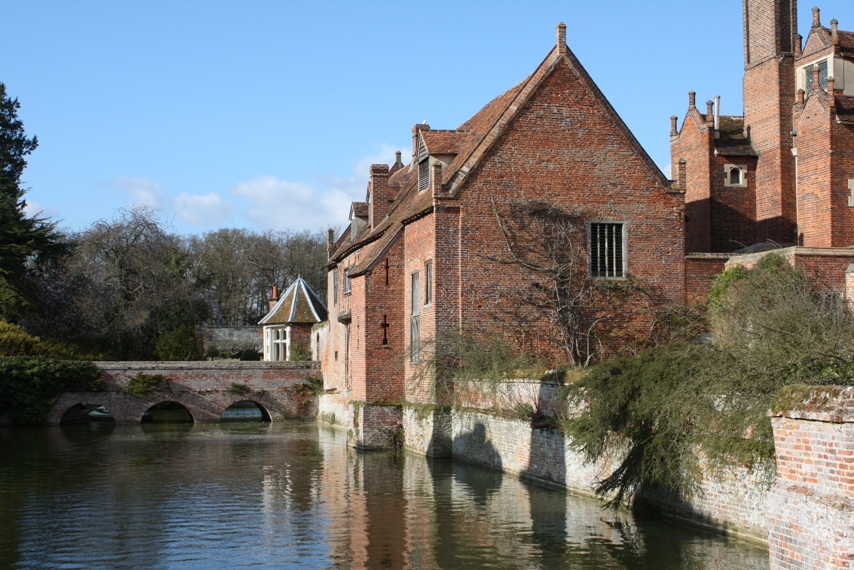
The Moat House at Kentwell Hall

The current Hall was constructed by several generations of the Clopton family. The oldest structure is the Moat House, which is estimated to have been built in the early 15th century. It comprises three levels. The ground floor is divided into three rooms that have been used as a dairy, bakery and brewery. The first floor is divided into a further three rooms; and there are two rooms in the attic space. The available evidence indicates that the Moat House was used during its lifetime as a service wing to the main Hall. However, historians suggest that the Moat House was originally built as a main residence, replacing the earlier house in the Pond Plantation. The construction of the room used as a brewery, in particular, indicates an open hall room, three levels high, with blackened timbers in the pitch of the gables providing evidence of a central hearth with no chimney.

The individual who commissioned the building of the Moat House is unknown; but the preferred candidate of many historians is Sir William Clopton, son of Sir Thomas Clopton and Katherine Mylde. He fought at the Battle of Agincourt in 1415 and died in 1446; he is buried in the Kentwell aisle in the nearby Holy Trinity Church where his effigy, in full armour, is displayed.

The main house at Kentwell was built in three phases: the main block, initially of two levels; the wings; and finally a third level. The main block was constructed by John Clopton (son of Sir William Clopton) in the late 15th century. The wings were added by his grandson, the third William Clopton, in the 1540s; finally the extra level, including a new long gallery, was added by his son Francis Clopton in the 1560s.

The Cloptons also rebuilt the Holy Trinity Church in Long Melford and added numerous stained glass windows portraying the family with brasses to their deceased. They also built the integral Clopton Chapel for private family worship.

=== 17th century ===
By the early 17th century, the Clopton family was in decline, and Kentwell Hall passed into the stewardship of the Waldegrave and later the Darcy families. Many of the surviving Cloptons joined the Puritan exodus to the North American colonies; one of them, Thomasine Clopton, married John Winthrop, one of the founders of the American city of Boston and the first Governor of the Massachusetts Bay Colony.

In 1676, the Manor of Kentwell, along with the accompanying Manor of Monks, Melford, were sold by Sir Thomas Darcy to Thomas Robinson. The recorded price was a total of £242 for 260 acres (1.1 km^{2}) of land available to the new owner; and a further £518.10s.0d for 1,018 acres (4.12 km^{2}) of land let to tenants. There is no record of the purchase price for the house.

The new owner was a lawyer who was made a baronet by Charles II in 1681. He was responsible for planting the mile-long avenue of lime trees that borders the driveway to the house and which still exists today. Robinson also undertook a number of alterations to the interior, most notably the construction of the open-well staircase in the east wing.

Robinson lost his life in 1683 jumping from a window in his chambers in the Temple district of London whilst trying to escape a fire. Kentwell passed to his son, Sir Lumley Robinson, but he died the following year. The third baronet, Sir Thomas Robinson, sold Kentwell in 1685 to pay off gambling debts. The new owners were the heirs of Sir John Moore, formerly the Lord Mayor of London in 1681.

=== Late 17th century to early 19th century ===
This period is the least well documented in the recent history of the Kentwell estate. During this period, Kentwell was owned by the heirs of the Moore family, but few details are known.

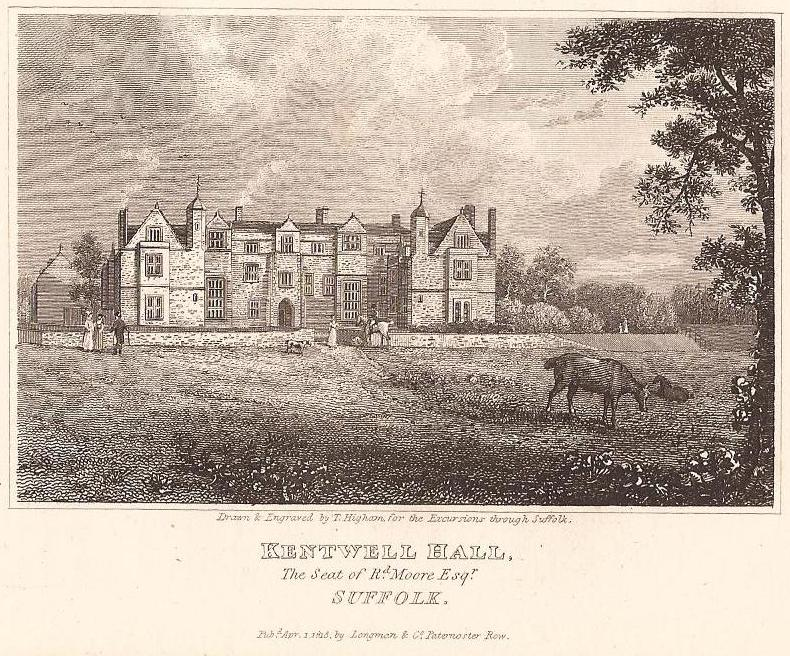
Kentwell Hall in 1818 by landscape engraver Thomas Higham, during Richard Moore's occupancy

From 1782 to 1823, the owner was Richard Moore and there is evidence of work carried out by him to the interior. There are Georgian features such as dentil cornices, fireplaces and doorways introduced during this period; and the mantlepiece in the Moat Bedroom, in the west wing, is decorated with the coat of arms of the Moore family. Some historians also believe that the Library and the Billiard Room, in the east wing, were created at the same time.

=== Victorian period ===
In 1823, Kentwell Hall was purchased by Robert Hart Logan, a Canadian of Scots descent who had made his fortune in the timber trade.

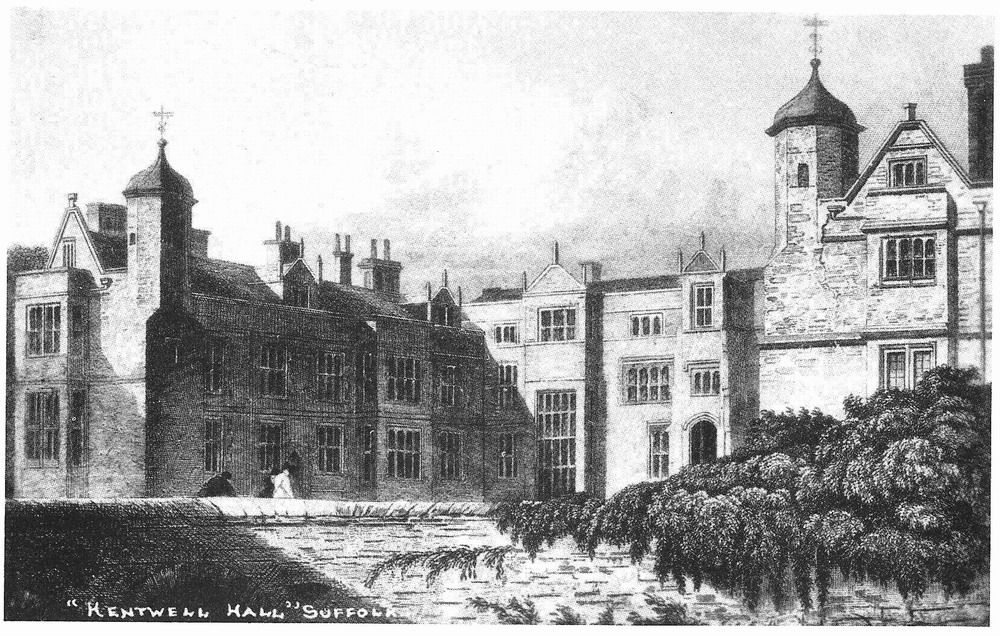
Engraving of Kentwell Hall in 1823, three years before the fire that destroyed much of the central part of the house

Three years later, in 1826, a fire broke out which destroyed much of the central interior, including the dining room and rooms on the garden side of the house. This prompted Logan to commission major structural changes to the interior of the central part of the house. He engaged Thomas Hopper, the noted Victorian architect, to design the changes. Hopper had recently been engaged by Sir William Parker to undertake work at neighbouring Melford Hall.

The principal alterations were to the main dining room and the Great Hall. Logan favoured a style that embodied elements of English Jacobean, Scottish Baronial and Gothic, which can still be seen today. In the Great Hall, the original screen and gallery were replaced and the ceiling was reconstructed. The design of the ceiling, copied from a similar room at Audley End in Essex, features hammer beams and wall posts that are coloured to resemble oak but are in fact entirely constructed of plaster. An 18th-century fireplace was retained.

The dining room's design featured Tudor arches in the upper half of the room and Jacobean arches and pilasters in the lower half. A Gothic-style heraldic fireplace and overmantel dominates the north side of the room, sculpted from Italian grey marble, depicting the coats of arms of the Clopton and Logan families. The design is copied from the medieval chimneypiece in the Bishop's Palace, Exeter, installed around 1485 by Peter Courtenay, Bishop of Exeter.

Hopper also undertook alterations to the Library and the Billiard Room in the east wing, including raising the ceiling heights by two feet.

Logan died, in debt, in 1839. Kentwell was sold to the Starkie Bence family who continued to occupy or let the house for over a century.

=== 20th century to present day ===
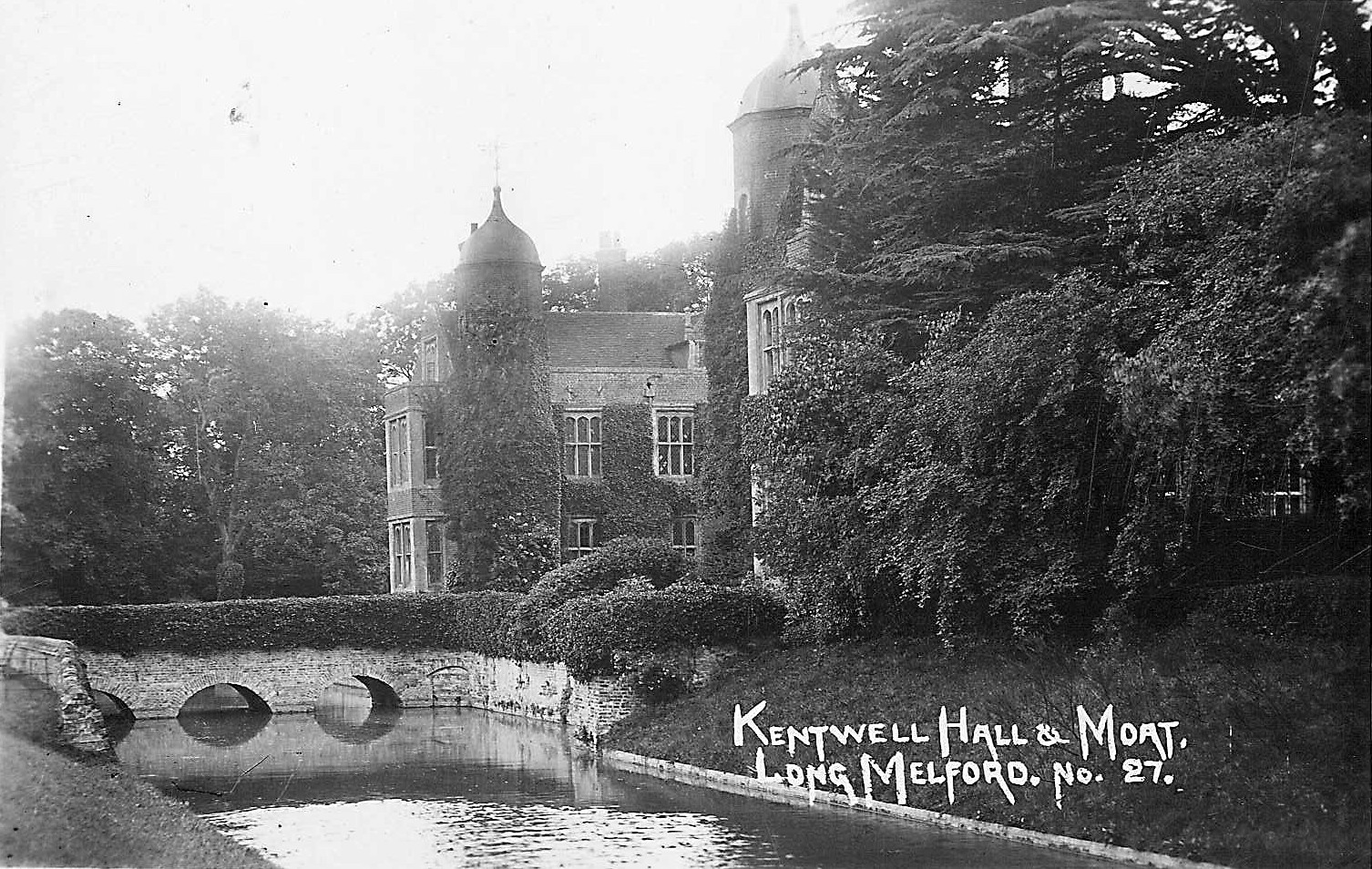
Kentwell Hall in 1910

From 1889, although Kentwell remained in the ownership of the Starkie Bence family, it was let to a succession of tenants. These included Sir John Aird, son of the noted Victorian civil engineer of the same name; solicitor Sir John Norton; the family of racing driver Dick Seaman; and Sir Connop Guthrie, whose wife redesigned the gardens.

During World War II, the house and park were requisitioned by the military, who used it as a large transit camp. Military units that passed through the camp included British airborne troops and elements of the 50th (Northumbrian) Infantry Division prior to D-Day. The owner of Kentwell Hall, Mrs. Maithal Starkie Bence, occupied rooms in the house at the time.

The Starkie Bence family finally sold Kentwell in 1971. The manor house is now owned by Patrick and Judith Phillips, who use the house as their home. Patrick Phillips bought the house in 1971 when it was in an advanced state of disrepair. Since that time, repairs and restorations have been funded by opening the house to the public.

== Events and historical re-enactments ==
=== Tudor period ===
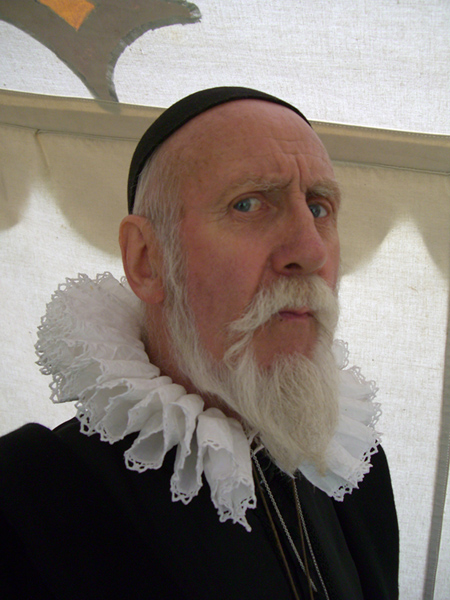
Kentwell Hall re-enactor portraying Tudor astronomer and alchemist John Dee

Since 1979, Kentwell Hall has presented Tudor period re-enactment events, portraying scenes of domestic Tudor life. The re-enactments involve up to 350 fully costumed volunteers on any given day and, at their peak in the mid 1990s, spanned a four-week period in June and July each year, with smaller events during the rest of the year. Events in 2020 were scaled back significantly because of restrictions related to the COVID-19 pandemic.

Re-enactors use Tudor speech patterns to converse with visitors to Kentwell Hall, which include large parties of schoolchildren. This involves first-person interpretation designed to create the impression that the visitor has stepped back in time to the 16th century. Each year is themed around a specific year in the Tudor period, with costumes and events designed accordingly. Particularly significant Tudor years have been portrayed several times, such as 1520 (Field of the Cloth of Gold), 1535 (Dissolution of the Monasteries), 1553 (Lady Jane Grey) 1578 (visit of Queen Elizabeth I to Suffolk) and 1588 (the Spanish Armada).

Over the years, it is estimated that more than half a million schoolchildren from as far afield as Japan have visited Kentwell Hall to experience the Tudor recreations.

==== Gallery of Tudor re-enactments ====
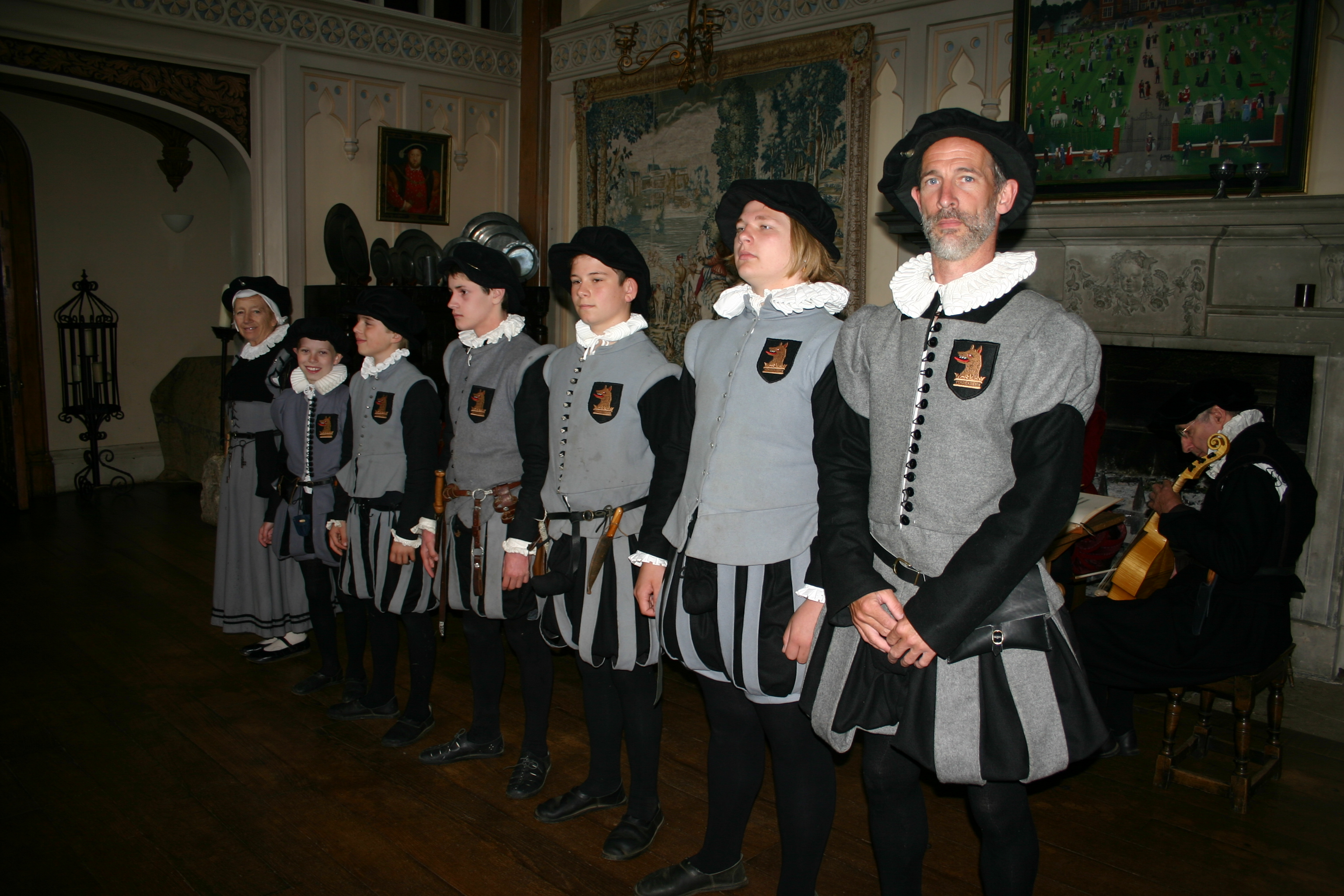
Liveried stewards, pages and housekeepers

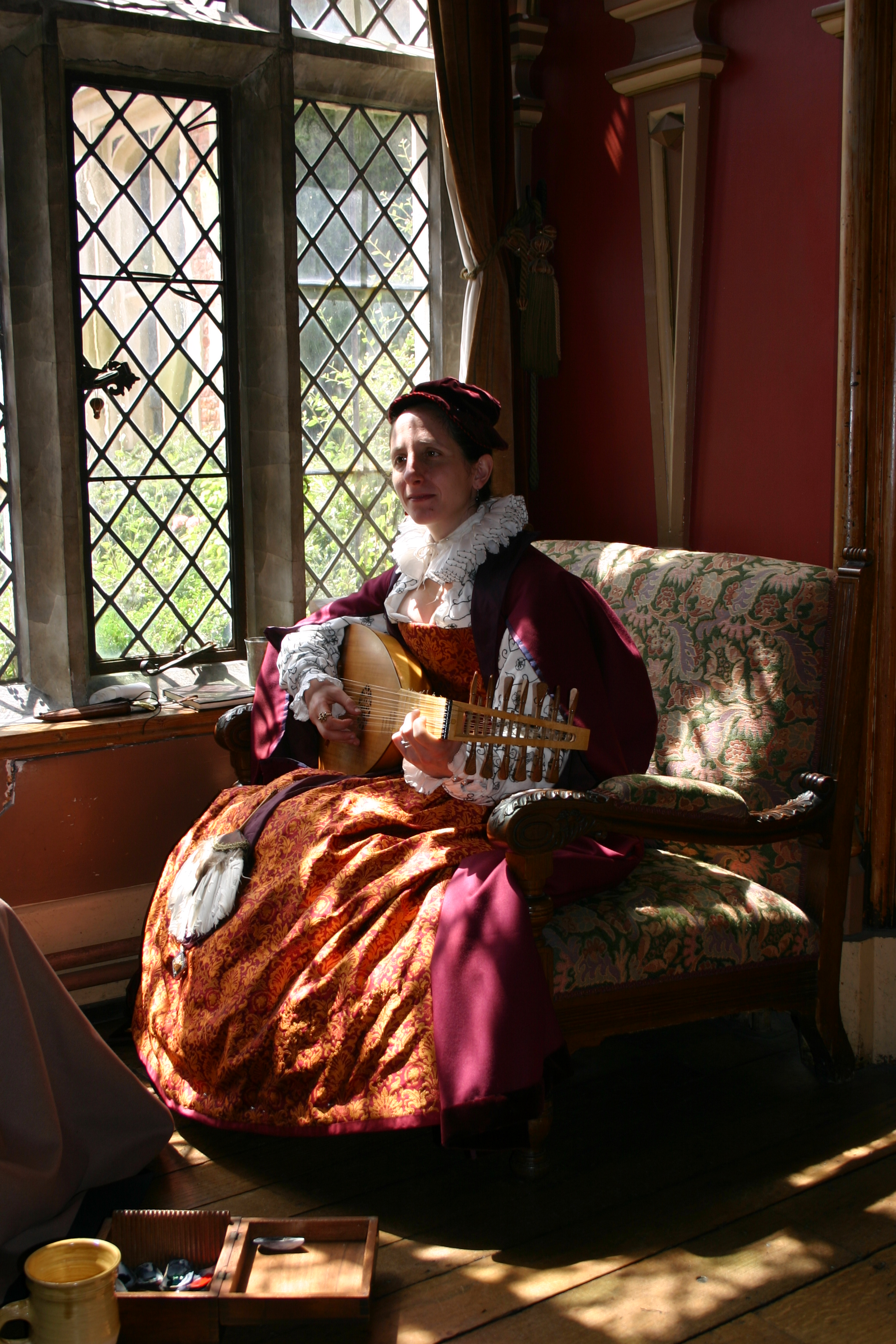
Tudor gentlewoman

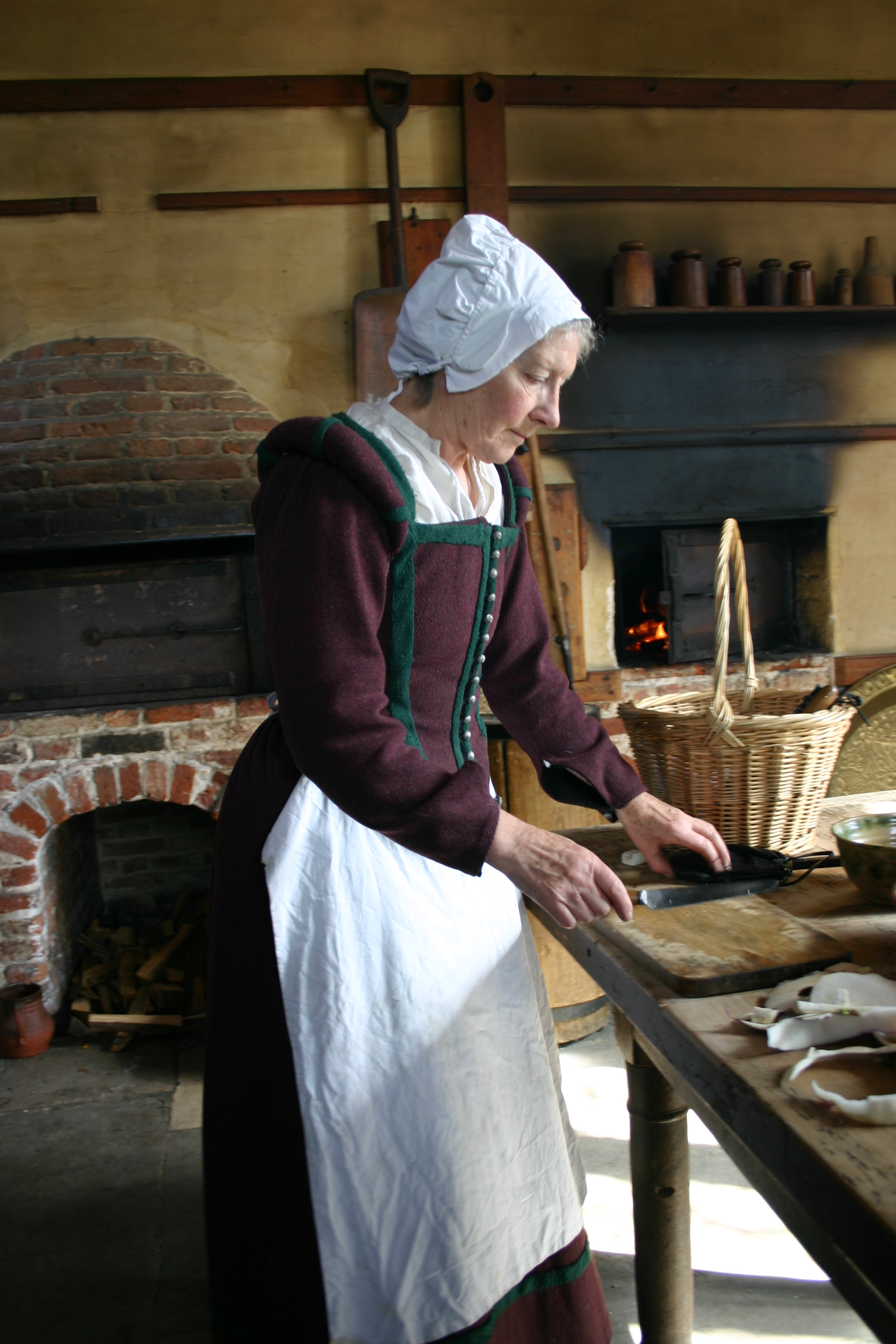
Cook in the Kentwell Kitchen

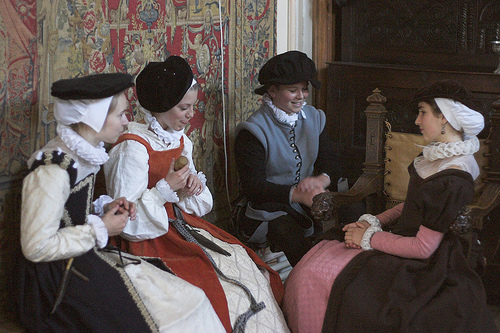
Children in the Kentwell Great Hall

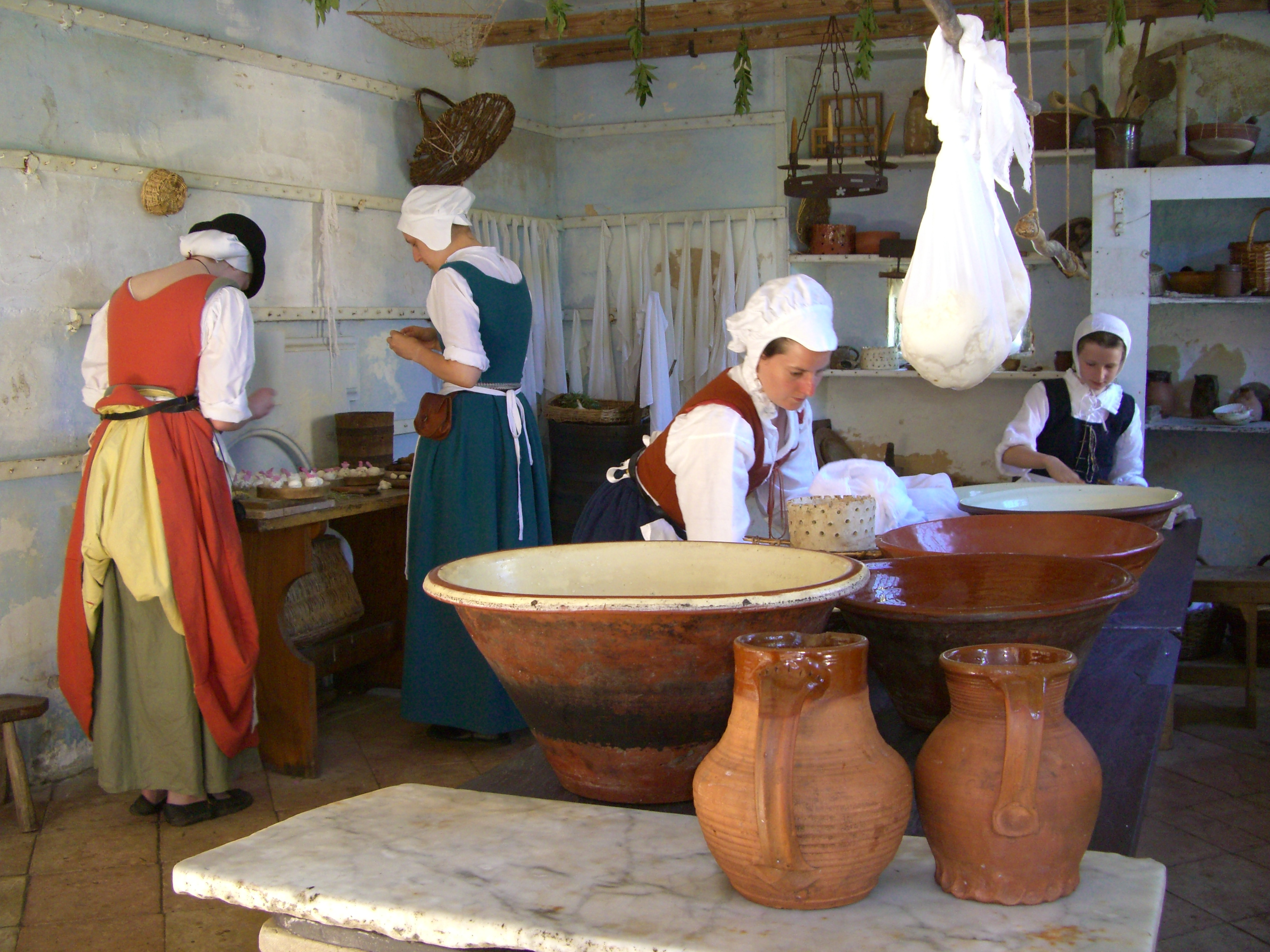
Dairymaids in the Kentwell dairy

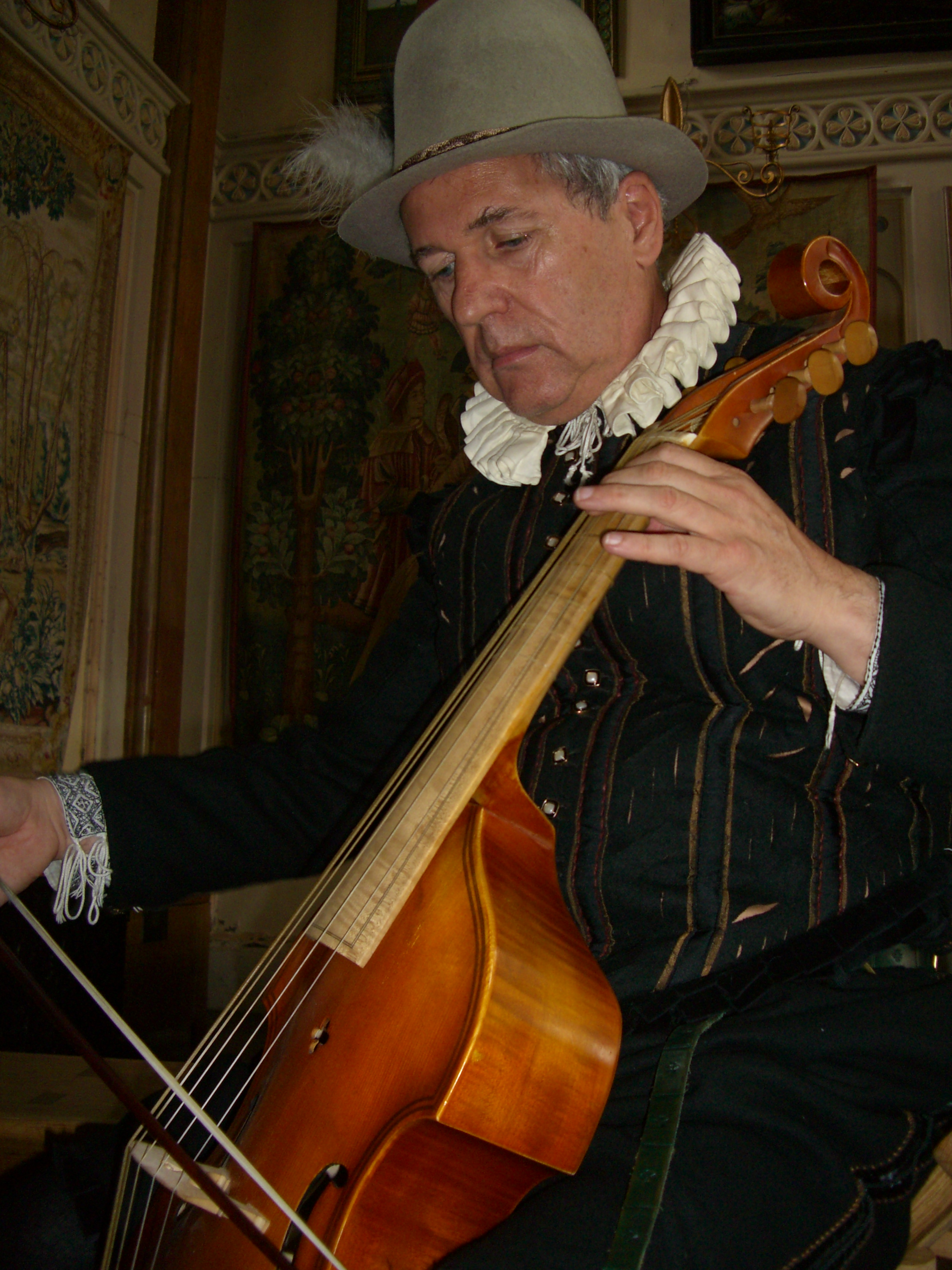
Tudor musician

=== World War II ===
In April 1995, Kentwell Hall presented a World War II re-enactment for the first time. This was timed to coincide with the prelude to the national commemoration of the 50th anniversary of VE Day. The event was designed to recreate the look and feel of wartime Britain, with volunteers representing both military and civilian life. Further World War II events have been presented by Kentwell in the years since.

=== Victorian ===
Kentwell Hall has presented Victorian period re-enactment events since 2009. Kentwell's Dickensian Christmas events include a representation of a Victorian manor house, including costumed family and servants; readings from A Christmas Carol featuring an actor portraying Charles Dickens with Victorian-style illusions; a Victorian music hall; and Victorian tearooms.

=== Scaresville ===
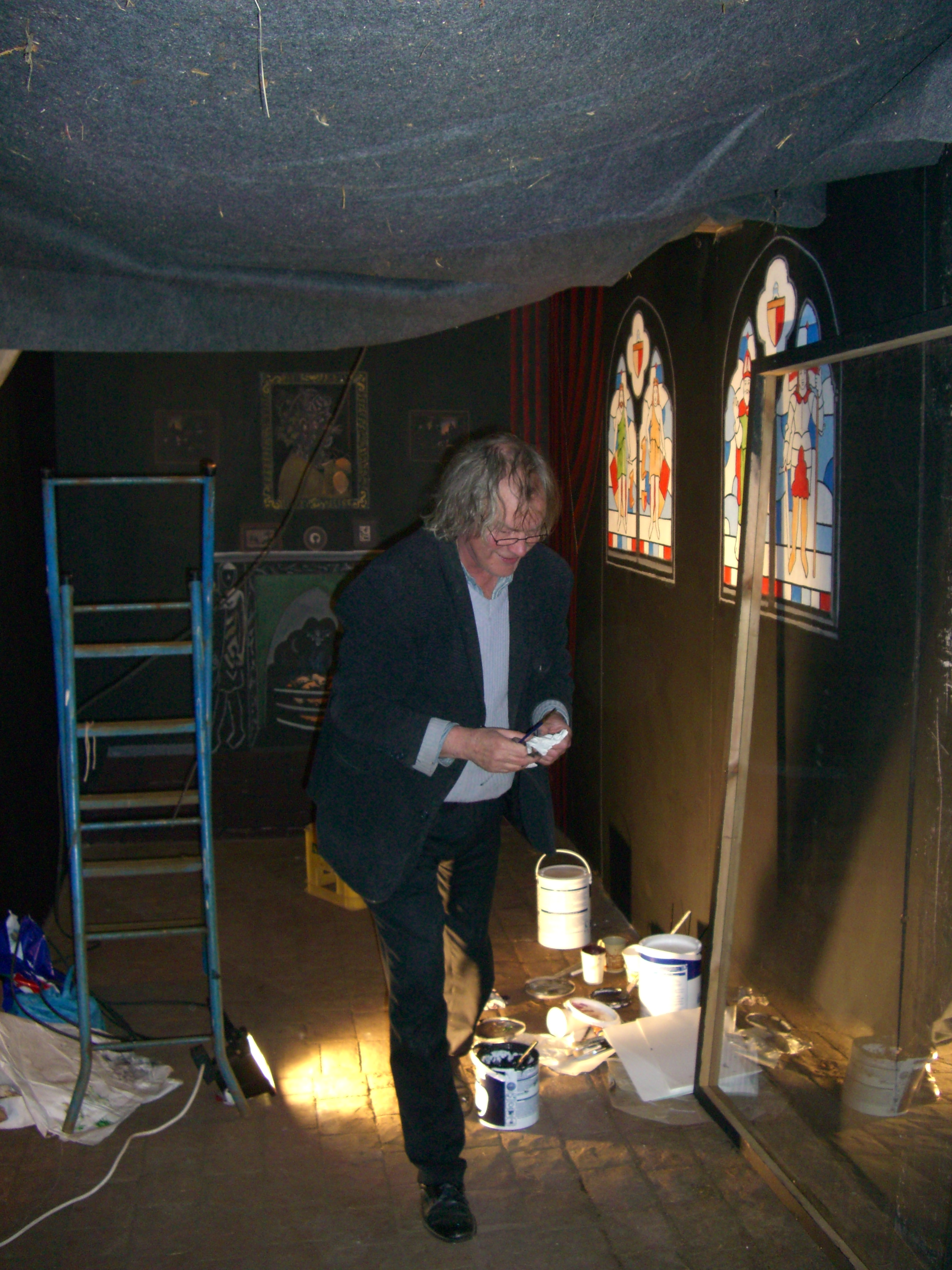
Artistic designer Paul Dufficey on the Scaresville set in 2007

Scaresville is an annual Hallowe'en-themed event presented at Kentwell Hall over a four-week period in October. This event developed from an earlier ghost tour event at Kentwell Hall and was launched in 2007. It operates as a winding route which takes visitors through haunted house sets, woodland, ancient buildings and open farmland, with a cast of 250 actors portraying characters such as dolls, zombies and killer clowns. The experience is presented in near-darkness.

The Scaresville designers made extensive use of techniques used in classic stage magic, such as mirrors, trapdoors and the Pepper's Ghost illusion. Artist and screen designer Paul Dufficey, whose work is associated with cinema director Ken Russell, acted as principal artistic designer during the formative years of Scaresville from 2007 to 2012. Basic motion activated sound units were used from 2007; later, computerised control equipment units were introduced to trigger synchronised visual, tactile and audio effects.

In 2009, Scaresville was voted the Best Seasonal or Hallowe'en Event at the UK's annual Screamie Awards, and won the Best Multi Part Halloween Event at the 2018 SCARE Awards.

In 2020 and 2021, uncertainties arising from UK government restrictions related to the COVID-19 pandemic forced the cancellation of Scaresville for those years.

==== Scaresville 2007- 2009 gallery ====
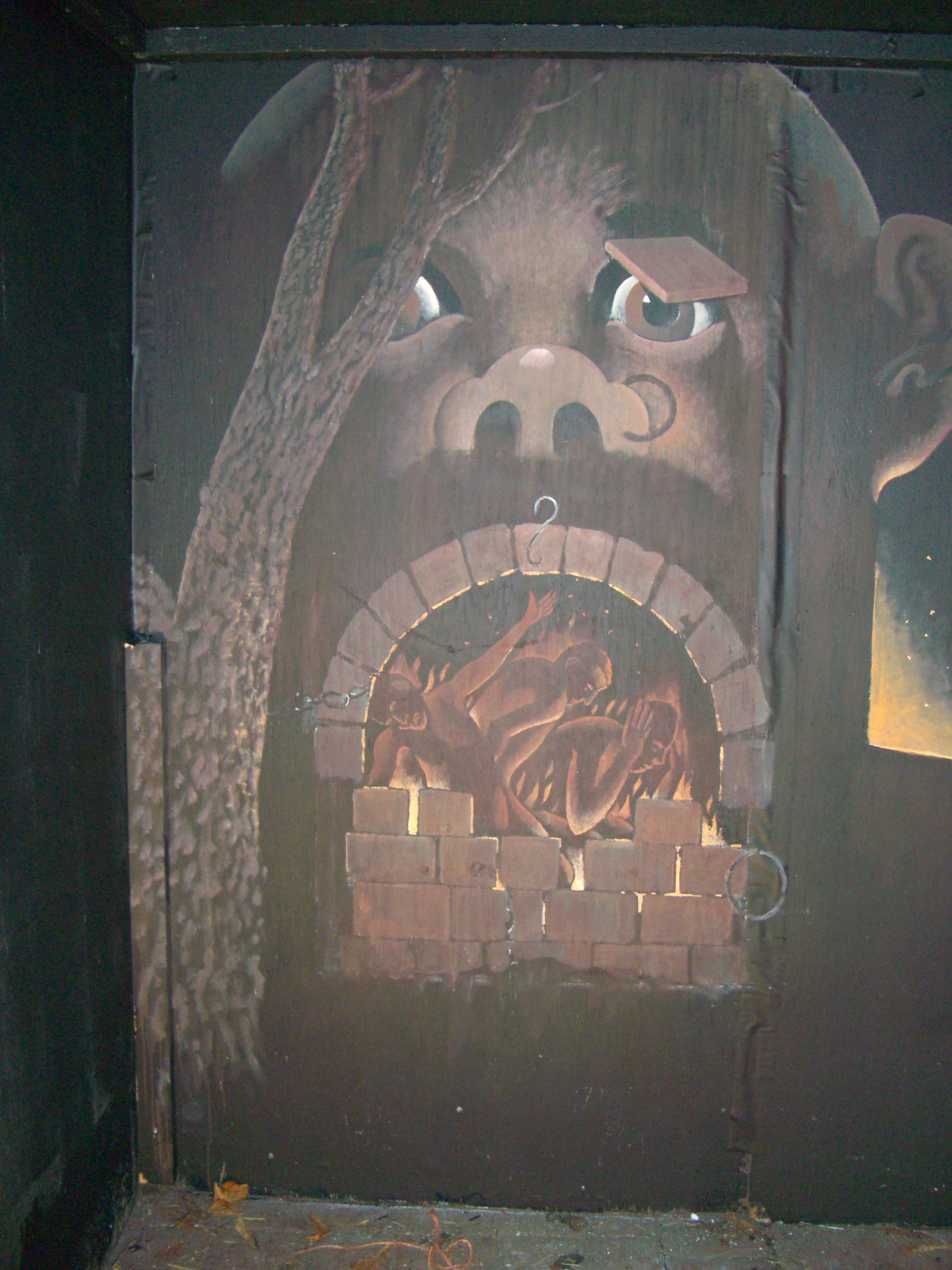
Original 2007 entrance to Scaresville event

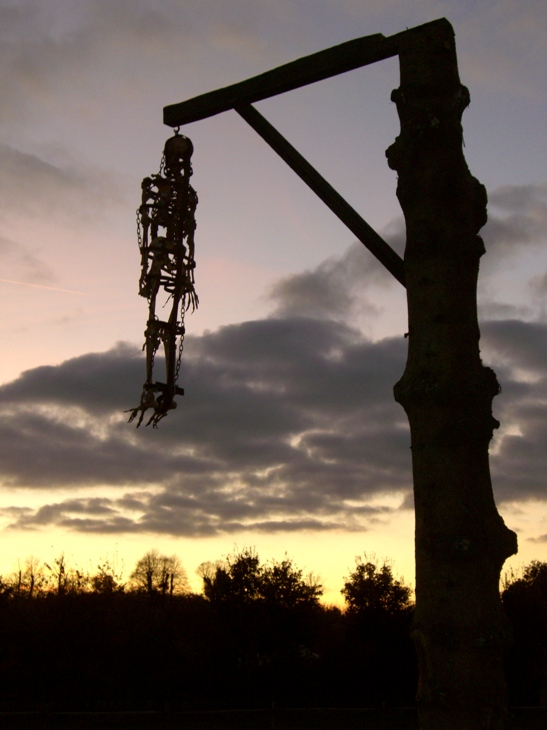
2007 hanging skeleton

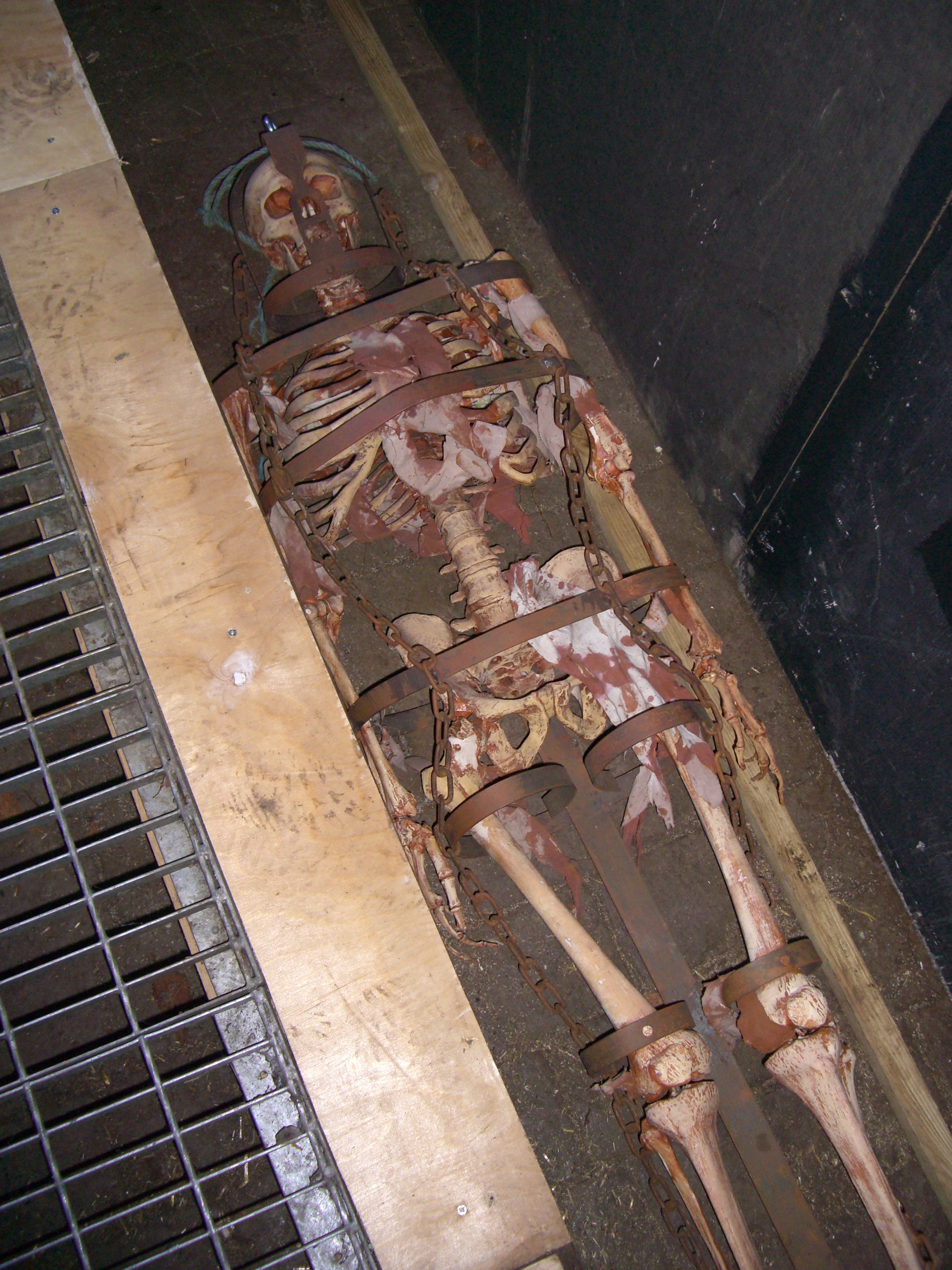
Skeleton used in 2007 Scaresville dungeon set

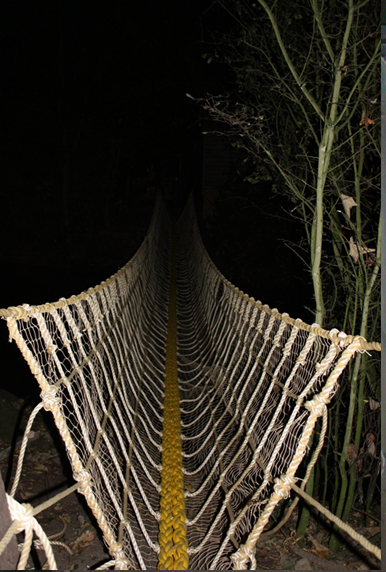
Rope bridge constructed for Scaresville in 2009

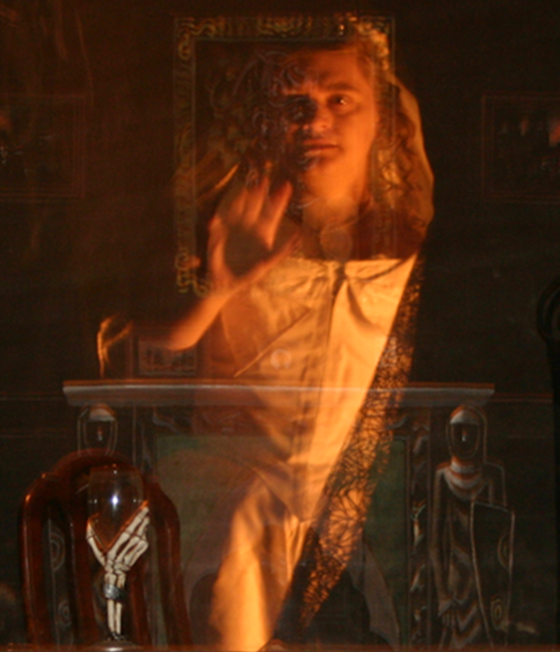
Pepper’s Ghost illusion used in Scaresville 2007 - 2009

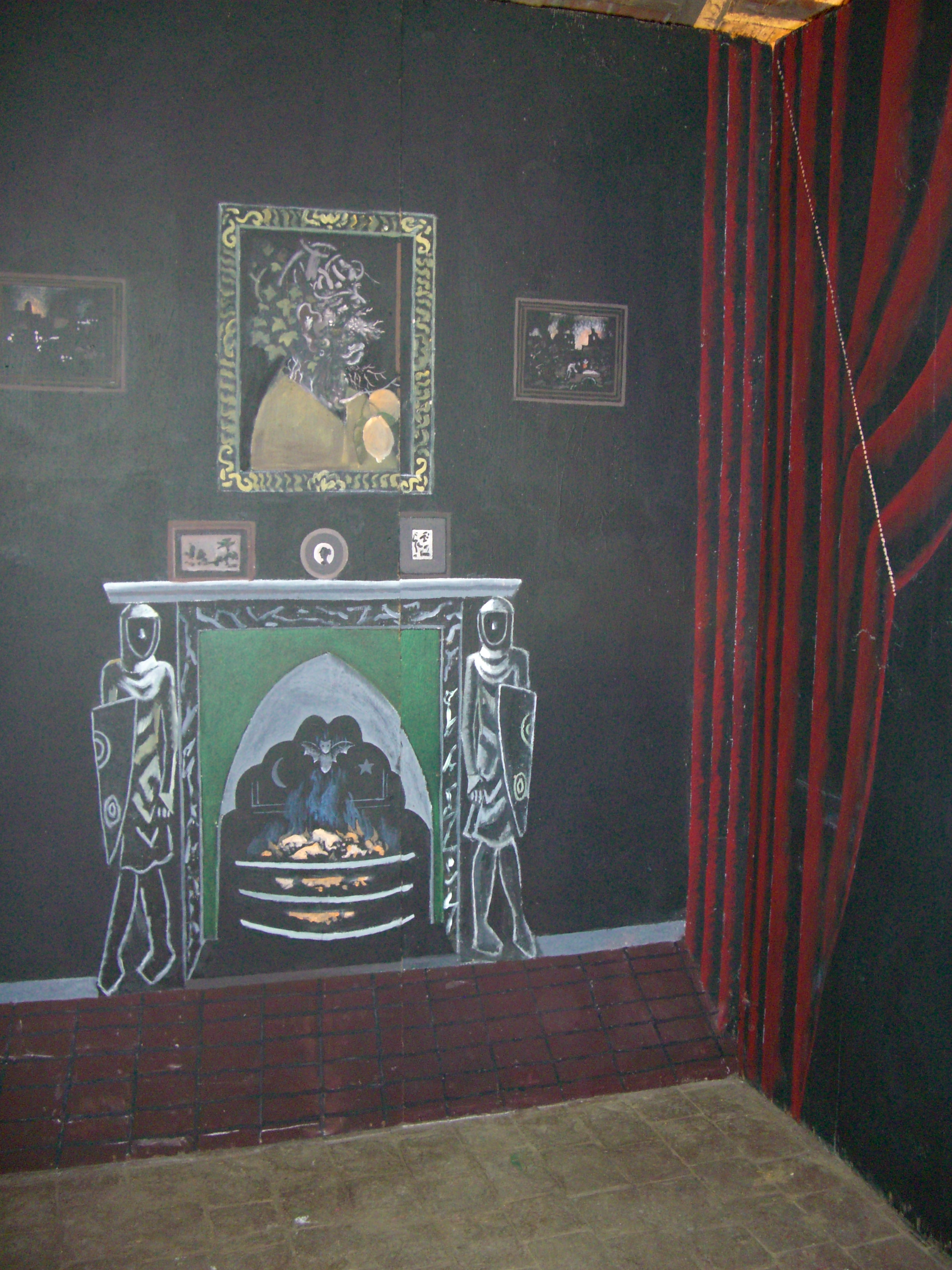
Background set for Pepper’s Ghost illusion used in Scaresville 2007 - 2009

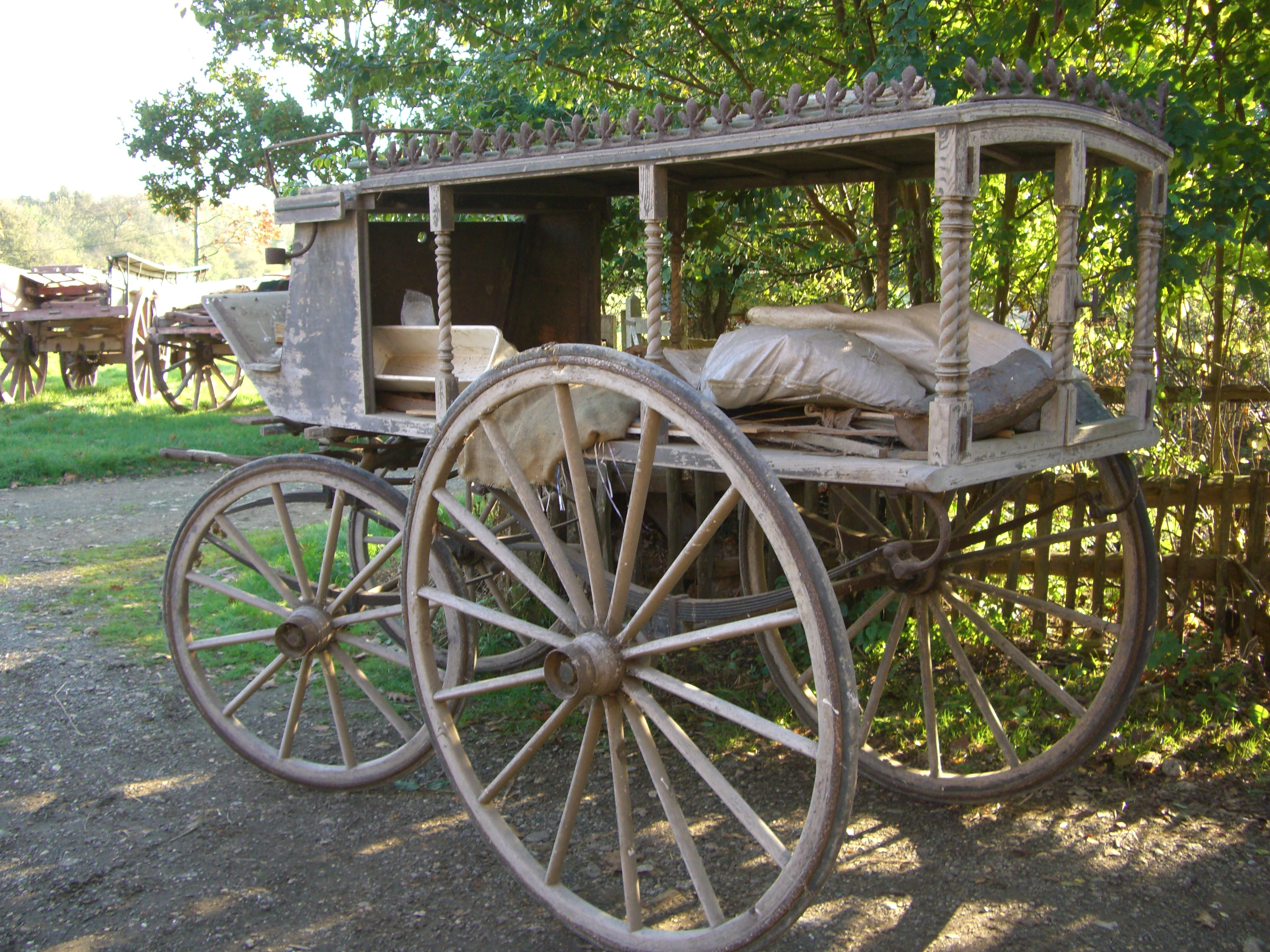
Victorian hearse used in Scaresville 2007, 2008 and 2022

=== Weddings and other events ===
Kentwell Hall is licensed for civil wedding ceremonies. It also hosts corporate functions, open-air theatre and music concerts at various times of the year.

=== Film and television location ===
Kentwell Hall has featured as a location for a number of film and TV productions. Some of the more notable examples include:

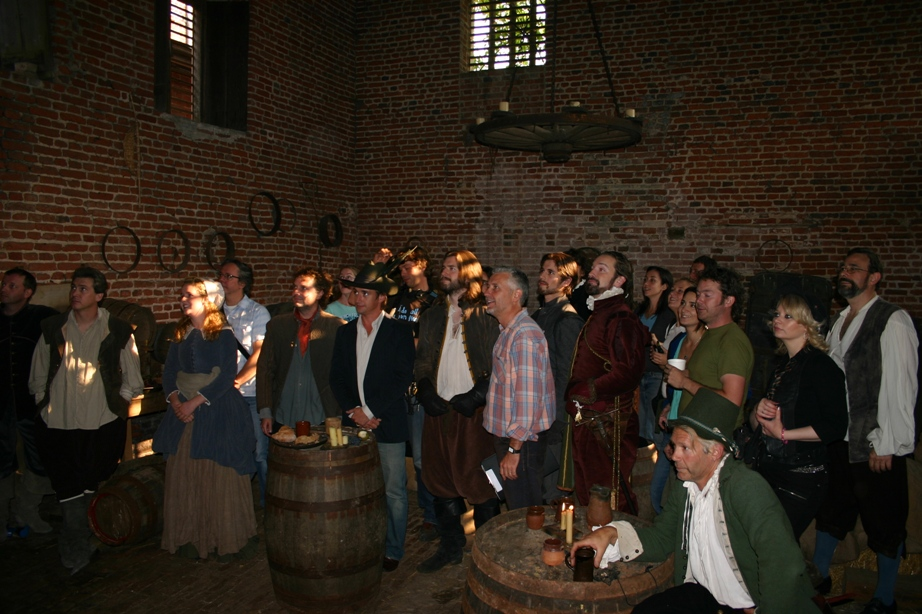
Presenter Richard Hammond and director Mike Slee with the cast and crew of the 2005 production The Gunpowder Plot: Exploding The Legend, filmed on location at Kentwell Hall.

Year	Title	Episode	Comments
1968	Witchfinder General		Starred Vincent Price as Witchfinder General Matthew Hopkins, with Ian Ogilvy, Rupert Davies and Hilary Dwyer.
1982	The Woman In White	2 episodes, untitled	BBC TV serialisation of the Wilkie Collins novel, starring Ian Richardson, Diana Quick and Jenny Seagrove.
1982	The Agatha Christie Hour	In a Glass Darkly	Thames Television TV adaptation of an Agatha Christie short story. Directed by Desmond Davis and starring Nicholas Clay, Emma Piper and Shaun Scott.
1983	No Excuses	One Easy Lesson; Rock 'N' Roll Mad; Little Actress; They're Onto Us; Whole Lot of Nothing; Getting Harder; Never Going Home; Encore	ITV TV drama about a failing female rock star, starring Charlotte Cornwell and directed by Roy Battersby.
1988	Treasure Hunt	Series 6, Episode 2: Suffolk	Channel 4 TV game show hosted by Kenneth Kendall and featuring Anneka Rice as the helicopter-borne "skyrunner".
1994	Will's World: A Surfeit of Meate and Drynke		BBC TV production, part of a season of Shakespeare commemorations. Featured celebrity cook Prue Leith and the Kentwell Tudor cooks.
1996	The Wind in the Willows		Adaptation of the Kenneth Grahame novel. Directed by Terry Jones and starring Eric Idle, Steve Coogan, Terry Jones, Antony Sher and Nicol Williamson. Kentwell featured as the outside of Toad Hall.
2003	Warrior Women with Lucy Lawless	Grace O'Malley, Pirate Queen	Discovery Channel production about Grace O'Malley, the Irish pirate queen. Presented by Lucy Lawless and starring Gabrielle Breathnach as Grace O'Malley and Jill Burton as Elizabeth I, and featuring Patrick Phillips as Elizabethan historian. Kentwell Hall represents Greenwich Palace in a scene in which Grace meets Queen Elizabeth I.
2003	Royal Deaths and Diseases	Royal Birth	Lion TV production for Channel 4. Featured Kentwell re-enactors in an episode about the phantom pregnancies of Mary I.
2004	Days That Shook the World	Affairs of the Crown: The Execution of Anne Boleyn/The Abdication of Edward VIII	BBC TV documentary about the life and death of Anne Boleyn. Featured Kentwell re-enactors.
2005	The Gunpowder Plot: Exploding The Legend		ITV production, hosted by Richard Hammond and directed by Mike Slee. A documentary commemorating the 400th anniversary of the Gunpowder Plot. Various scenes featuring the conspirators and King James I were filmed around the Kentwell grounds.
2005	The Chronicles of Narnia: The Lion, the Witch and the Wardrobe		Walden Media adaptation of the C. S. Lewis story. Kentwell Hall appeared fleetingly as the outside of the Professor's house. As the production was based in New Zealand, it was impractical to use Kentwell as a traditional location; so a special effects team scanned the house and created a 3D digital model, which was used to create a CGI image for the final film.
2006	Stately Suppers	Series 1, Episode 8: Kentwell Hall	BBC2 series in which presenter Alistair Appleton and chef James Martin visit stately homes to cook dinner and explore the locality.
2006	Antiques Roadshow	Series 30, Episode 21: Kentwell Hall	BBC series in which antiques experts travel to various regions across the United Kingdom to evaluate and price antiques brought by members of the public.
2013	Henry VII: Winter King		Lion TV production for BBC TV. Historical docu-drama based on the book of the same name by Thomas Penn. Featured Kentwell locations and re-enactors.
2013	A Very British Murder with Lucy Worsley	The New Taste for Blood	Documentary on the murder of Maria Marten in the Red Barn, Polstead, Suffolk, UK. Features Lucy Worsley and Rosalind Crone.
2015	History's Ultimate Spies	Series 1, Episode 1: Thomas Cromwell; Series 1, Episode 2: Francis Walsingham; Series 1, Episode 3: Robert Cecil; Series 1, Episode 4: Cardinal Richelieu; Series 1, Episode 5: Zofia Potocka; Series 1, Episode 6: Elizabeth Van Lew	Yesterday Channel docudrama on the subject of historical spymasters such as Thomas Cromwell, Francis Walsingham and Cardinal Richelieu. Narrated by Ross Andrews. Location filming featuring Kentwell interiors and exteriors took place in November 2014.
2015	Draw on Sweet Night		Independent film production written and directed by Tony Britten. Location filming took place at Kentwell in November 2014. Starring Mark Arends, Doon Mackichan and Sophia Di Martino.
2017	Tulip Fever		Directed by Justin Chadwick and based on a book by Deborah Moggach. Location filming took place at Kentwell in July 2014. Starring Alicia Vikander, Dane DeHaan and Dame Judi Dench.
