= Whelnetham =

Whelnetham may refer to the following places in Suffolk, England:

- Great Whelnetham
- Little Whelnetham
