= Cockfield =

Cockfield may refer to:

- Cockfield, County Durham, a village in County Durham, England
- Cockfield, Suffolk, a village in Suffolk, England
  - Cockfield (Suffolk) railway station
- Cockfield Hall, near Yoxford, Suffolk, England
- (Francis) Arthur Cockfield, Baron Cockfield (1916–2007), an English politician
