= Lavenham railway station =

Former railway station in England

Coordinates: 52.1131°N 0.7978°E

Lavenham
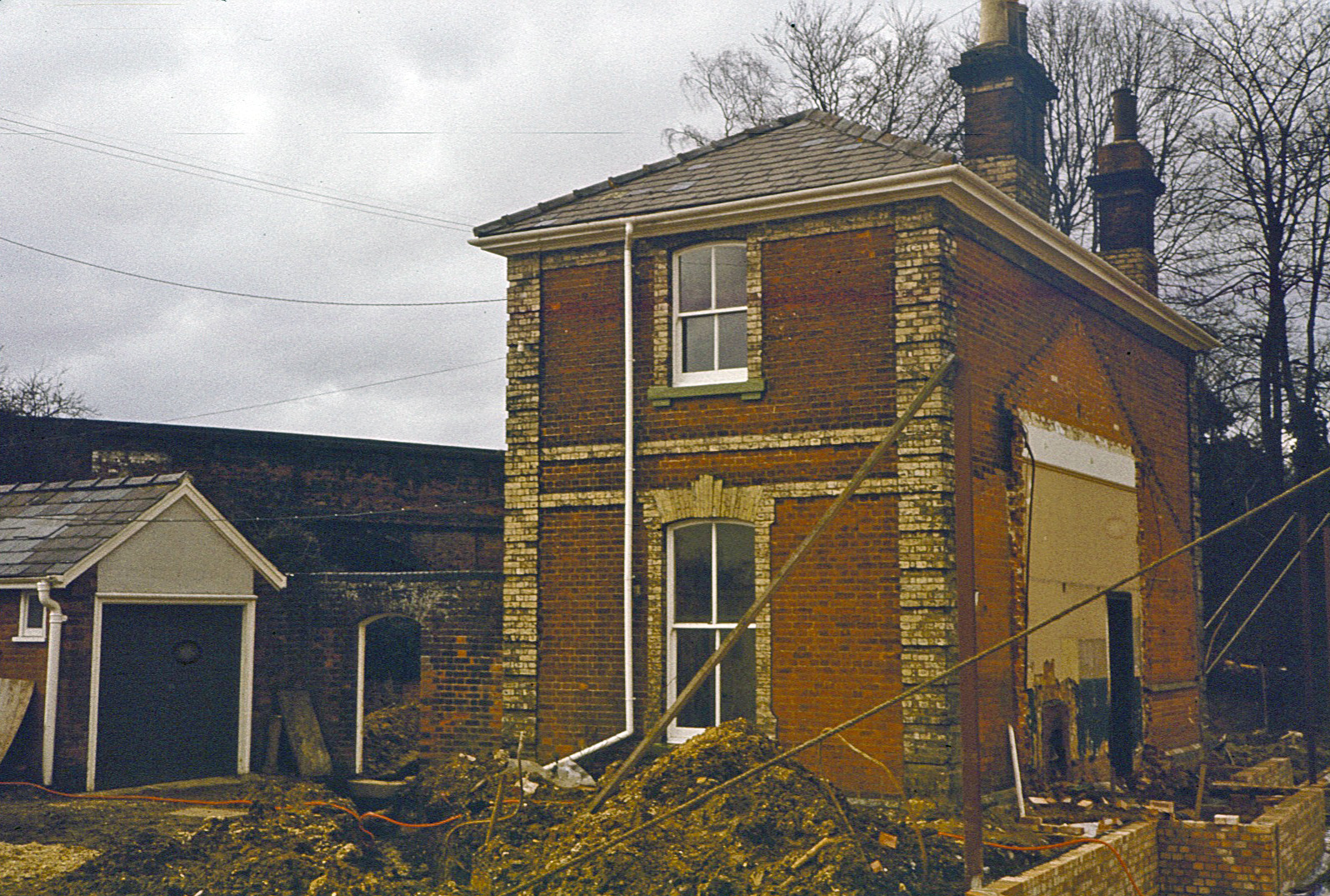
- The station c. 1978, partially demolished

General information
- Location: Lavenham, Babergh; England
- Platforms: 2

Other information
- Status: Disused

History
- Pre-grouping: Great Eastern Railway
- Post-grouping: London and North Eastern Railway

Key dates
- 9 Aug 1865: Opened
- 10 Apr 1961: Closed to passengers
- 19 April 1965: Closed to freight
Location

Lavenham railway station was a station in Lavenham, Suffolk, on the Long Melford–Bury St Edmunds branch line. It closed to passengers in 1961, and the station buildings remained in use as offices until about 2010, when they were demolished.

Preceding station	Disused railways	Following station
Long Melford	Long Melford-Bury St Edmunds Branch	Cockfield
