= Listed buildings in Cockfield, Suffolk =

Historic structures in Suffolk, England

Cockfield is a village and civil parish in the Babergh District of Suffolk, England. It contains 59 listed buildings that are recorded in the National Heritage List for England. Of these one is grade I, one is grade II* and 57 are grade II.

This list is based on the information retrieved online from Historic England.

== Key ==
Grade	Criteria
I	Buildings that are of exceptional interest
II*	Particularly important buildings of more than special interest
II	Buildings that are of special interest

== Listing ==
Name	Grade	Location	Type	Completed (Note: The date given is the date used by Historic England as significant for the initial building or that of an important part in the structure's description.)	Date designated	Grid ref. (Note: The grid reference is based on the British national grid reference system, sometimes known as OSGB36, used by the Ordnance Survey.) Geo-coordinates	Notes	Entry number (Note: The "List Entry Number" is a unique number assigned to each listed building and scheduled monument by Historic England.)	Image	Wikidata
Abbey Farmhouse	II				10 July 1980	TL9001754856; 52°09′33″N 0°46′35″E		1037329	Upload Photo	Q26289043
Cliptbush Farmhouse	II				23 January 1958	TL9071153185; 52°08′38″N 0°47′09″E		1285795	Upload Photo	Q26574459
Cockfield War Memorial	II		war memorial		2 February 2018	TL9055654658; 52°09′26″N 0°47′03″E		1452546	Cockfield War Memorial More images	Q66479279
Earl's Hall	II				10 July 1980	TL9099253488; 52°08′48″N 0°47′24″E		1037328	Upload Photo	Q26289042
Peppers Hall	II				23 January 1958	TL8992055686; 52°10′00″N 0°46′32″E		1037327	Upload Photo	Q26289041
Smallbridge House	II				10 July 1980	TL9114356484; 52°10′25″N 0°47′38″E		1285832	Upload Photo	Q26574493
The Abbey	II				10 July 1980	TL9010454917; 52°09′35″N 0°46′40″E		1285803	Upload Photo	Q26574466
The Abbey Cottage	II				14 October 1992	TL8999154948; 52°09′36″N 0°46′34″E		1275883	Upload Photo	Q26565438
Spinney End	II	Bury Road			10 July 1980	TL8889153454; 52°08′49″N 0°45′34″E		1037330	Upload Photo	Q26289044
Wagtails	II	Bury Road, Bury St Edmunds, IP30 0JR			10 July 1980	TL9001654360; 52°09′17″N 0°46′34″E		1285799	Upload Photo	Q26574463
Brook Farmhouse	II	Button's Green			10 July 1980	TL9181353220; 52°08′38″N 0°48′07″E		1194219	Upload Photo	Q26488850
Button's Green Farmhouse	II	Button's Green			10 July 1980	TL9189153225; 52°08′38″N 0°48′11″E		1037331	Upload Photo	Q26289045
Sparrow's House	II	Chapel Road			10 July 1980	TL9136555369; 52°09′48″N 0°47′47″E		1037332	Upload Photo	Q26289046
The Cottage	II	Chapel Road			10 July 1980	TL9156555718; 52°09′59″N 0°47′59″E		1194227	Upload Photo	Q26488858
Church House	II*	Church Lane	house		23 January 1958	TL9037954944; 52°09′36″N 0°46′55″E		1194237	Church House More images	Q17533927
Church of St Peter	I	Church Lane	church building		23 January 1958	TL9039654991; 52°09′37″N 0°46′56″E		1037333	Church of St Peter More images	Q17541934
Upper Church Farmhouse	II	Church Lane			23 January 1958	TL9040854936; 52°09′35″N 0°46′56″E		1037334	Upload Photo	Q26289047
Arden Craig	II	Colchester Green			10 July 1980	TL9218555395; 52°09′48″N 0°48′31″E		1194243	Upload Photo	Q26488871
Barn to the North West of Cross Green Farmhouse	II	Cross Green			10 July 1980	TL8960055723; 52°10′02″N 0°46′15″E		1194290	Upload Photo	Q26488917
Cob Cottages	II	Cross Green			15 August 1969	TL8965655650; 52°09′59″N 0°46′18″E		1194260	Upload Photo	Q26488889
Cross Green Cottage	II	Cross Green			15 August 1969	TL8962055605; 52°09′58″N 0°46′16″E		1037340	Upload Photo	Q26289054
Cross Green Farmhouse	II	Cross Green			15 August 1969	TL8962455701; 52°10′01″N 0°46′17″E		1351450	Upload Photo	Q26634557
Farthings	II	Cross Green			15 August 1969	TL8962055623; 52°09′59″N 0°46′16″E		1285764	Upload Photo	Q26574428
Hope House	II	Cross Green, IP30 0LG			15 August 1969	TL8964855639; 52°09′59″N 0°46′18″E		1351449	Upload Photo	Q26634556
K6 Telephone Kiosk	II	Cross Green			11 May 1989	TL8963755631; 52°09′59″N 0°46′17″E		1351612	Upload Photo	Q26634698
Mill House	II	Cross Green			15 August 1969	TL8960955655; 52°10′00″N 0°46′16″E		1351451	Upload Photo	Q26634558
Peppers Hall Cottages	II	Cross Green			10 July 1980	TL8965955672; 52°10′00″N 0°46′18″E		1037337	Upload Photo	Q26289050
Plane House	II	Cross Green			10 July 1980	TL8956755710; 52°10′02″N 0°46′14″E		1194294	Upload Photo	Q26488921
Thatch on the Green	II	Cross Green			15 August 1969	TL8964355682; 52°10′01″N 0°46′17″E		1194262	Upload Photo	Q26488891
Thatchers Restaurant	II	Cross Green			15 August 1969	TL8968255486; 52°09′54″N 0°46′19″E		1037335	Upload Photo	Q26289048
The Cottage (north of Haslers Mill)	II	Cross Green			15 August 1969	TL8958355689; 52°10′01″N 0°46′14″E		1037339	Upload Photo	Q26289053
The Water	II	Cross Green			15 August 1969	TL8967755512; 52°09′55″N 0°46′19″E		1037336	Upload Photo	Q26289049
Tudor Cottage	II	Cross Green			10 July 1980	TL8954055747; 52°10′03″N 0°46′12″E		1037338	Upload Photo	Q26289051
Water End Cottage	II	Cross Green			10 July 1980	TL8966255441; 52°09′53″N 0°46′18″E		1194248	Upload Photo	Q26488876
The Walnuts and the Thatched House	II	Felsham Road			14 November 1989	TL9203955939; 52°10′06″N 0°48′24″E		1275903	Upload Photo	Q26565456
Forge Cottage	II	Great Green			10 July 1980	TL9157855916; 52°10′06″N 0°48′00″E		1194316	Upload Photo	Q26488943
Great Green House	II	Great Green			10 July 1980	TL9171055793; 52°10′02″N 0°48′06″E		1351452	Upload Photo	Q26634559
Green Farmhouse	II	Great Green			10 July 1980	TL9154955982; 52°10′08″N 0°47′58″E		1285735	Upload Photo	Q26574400
Moat Cottage	II	Great Green			20 April 1998	TL9195855921; 52°10′05″N 0°48′20″E		1119682	Upload Photo	Q26412989
Old House Farmhouse	II	Great Green			10 July 1980	TL9179456066; 52°10′10″N 0°48′11″E		1285766	Upload Photo	Q26574430
The Thatched Cottage	II	Great Green			10 July 1980	TL9155955941; 52°10′07″N 0°47′59″E		1037341	Upload Photo	Q26289056
Dormers	II	Howe Lane			10 July 1980	TL9116154979; 52°09′36″N 0°47′36″E		1194329	Upload Photo	Q26488956
Elmers Keepers Cottage	II	Howe Lane			10 July 1980	TL9117755043; 52°09′38″N 0°47′37″E		1037343	Upload Photo	Q26289059
Six Bells	II	Howe Lane			10 July 1980	TL9059054678; 52°09′27″N 0°47′05″E		1351453	Upload Photo	Q26634560
Tuns Farmhouse	II	Howe Lane			10 July 1980	TL9110754967; 52°09′36″N 0°47′33″E		1037342	Upload Photo	Q26289057
Oldhall Green Farmhouse	II	Oldhall Green			10 July 1980	TL8985956293; 52°10′20″N 0°46′30″E		1285739	Upload Photo	Q26574403
Barn at the Old Rectory	II	Parsonage Green			10 July 1980	TL9125255015; 52°09′37″N 0°47′41″E		1351473	Upload Photo	Q26634576
Rest Cottage	II	Parsonage Green			10 July 1980	TL9137155098; 52°09′40″N 0°47′47″E		1351474	Upload Photo	Q26634577
The Long House	II	Parsonage Green			10 July 1980	TL9124055102; 52°09′40″N 0°47′40″E		1037300	Upload Photo	Q26289008
The Old Rectory	II	Parsonage Green			10 July 1980	TL9131354989; 52°09′36″N 0°47′44″E		1037299	Upload Photo	Q26289006
Smithwood Green House	II	Smithwood Green			10 July 1980	TL9081452476; 52°08′15″N 0°47′13″E		1037301	Upload Photo	Q26289010
The Thatched Cottage	II	Smithwood Green			10 July 1980	TL9066052606; 52°08′20″N 0°47′05″E		1351475	Upload Photo	Q26685431
Stow's Hill Farmhouse	II	Stows Hill			10 July 1980	TL9096453012; 52°08′33″N 0°47′22″E		1037303	Upload Photo	Q26289012
The Three Horseshoes Inn and Adjoining Tenement	II	Stows Hill	thatched pub		10 July 1980	TL9101353013; 52°08′33″N 0°47′24″E		1037302	The Three Horseshoes Inn and Adjoining Tenement More images	Q26289011
Ivy Cottage	II	Willow Bridge			10 July 1980	TL9066253418; 52°08′46″N 0°47′06″E		1351476	Upload Photo	Q26634579
Oak Studs	II	Windsor Green			10 July 1980	TL8935854776; 52°09′32″N 0°46′01″E		1194447	Upload Photo	Q26489073
Roundwood	II	Windsor Green			10 July 1980	TL8932654739; 52°09′30″N 0°45′59″E		1037305	Upload Photo	Q26289015
The Thatched Cottage	II	Windsor Green			10 July 1980	TL8932354832; 52°09′33″N 0°45′59″E		1037304	Upload Photo	Q26289013
Windsor Cottage	II	Windsor Green			10 July 1980	TL8939754853; 52°09′34″N 0°46′03″E		1351438	Upload Photo	Q26634545

== See also ==
- Grade I listed buildings in Suffolk
- Grade II* listed buildings in Suffolk

== Sources ==
- Bettely, James; Pevsner, Nikolaus (2015) [1961], Suffolk: West, The Buildings of England, New Haven and London: Yale University Press, ISBN 978-0-300-19655-9
