= Aonio Paleario =

Italian Christian reformer

Aonio Paleario or Aonius Palearius (c. 1500 – July 3, 1570) was an Italian Christian termed a reformer.

== Life ==
He was born about 1500 at Veroli, in the Roman Campagna. Other forms of his name are Antonio Della Paglia, A. Degli Pagliaricci.

In 1520 he went to Rome, where he entered the brilliant literary circle of Leo X. When Charles of Bourbon stormed Rome in 1527, Paleario went first to Perugia and then to Siena, where he settled as a teacher of Greek and Hebrew.

In 1536 his didactic poem in Latin hexameters, De immortalitate animarum, was published at Lyon. It is divided into three books, the first containing his proofs of the divine existence, and the remaining two the theological and philosophical arguments for immortality based on that postulate. The whole concludes with a rhetorical description of the occurrences of the Second Advent.

In 1542 the Inquisition made his tract Della Pienezza, sufficienza, et satisfazione della passione di Christo, or Libellus de morte Christi (The Benefit of Christ's Death), the basis of a charge of heresy, from which, however, he successfully defended himself. In Siena he wrote his Actio in pontifices romanos et eorum asseclas, a vigorous indictment, in twenty testimonia, against what he now believed to be the fundamental error of the Roman Church in subordinating Scripture to tradition, as well as against various particular doctrines, such as that of purgatory; it was not, however, printed until after his death (Leipzig, 1606).

In 1546 he accepted a professorial chair at Lucca, which he exchanged in 1555 for that of Greek and Latin literature at Milan. Here about 1566 his enemies renewed their activity, and in 1567 he was formally accused by Fra Angelo, the inquisitor of Milan. He was tried at Rome, condemned to death in October 1569, and executed in July 1570.

== Works ==
An edition of his works (Ant. Palearii Verulani Opera), including four books of Epistolae and twelve Orationes besides the De immortalitate, was published at Lyon in 1552; this was followed by two others, at Basel, and several after his death, the fullest being that of Amsterdam, 1696. A work, entitled Benefizio di Cristo ("The Benefit of Christ's Death"), has been attributed to Paleario on insufficient grounds.

Among the early biographical studies of Paleario was Mary Young's two-volume The Life and Times of Aonio Paleario; or, A History of the Italian Reformers in the Sixteenth Century, published in London in 1860. Young, née Ancrum, spent many years in Italy researching the history of the Reformation there and was also active in the Protestant evangelical movement in Pisa, where she helped establish a new congregation and financed the construction of the Tempio valdese di Pisa in 1862.

Other biographies include those by Gurlitt (Hamburg, 1805) and Bonnet (Paris, 1862).

Churchill Babington, vicar of Cockfield, Suffolk published an English translation of Benefizio di Cristo in 1855.

Aonio Paleario is the subject of a 2014 novel A Dream of Shadows by Diana M. DeLuca. This novel was awarded two first place awards by Reader Views annual literary contest n the categories of Spiritual Fiction and Best in the Rocky Mountain region 2014.
