= Bury St Edmunds Eastgate railway station =

Disused railway station in England

Coordinates: 52.2476°N 0.7242°E

Bury St Edmunds Eastgate railway station (also known as Bury Eastgate was a station in the town of Bury St Edmunds, England, on the Long Melford-Bury St Edmunds Branch. It was opened in 1865 and closed in 1909.

The station was demolished after closure and following closure of the line in 1965 the route was occupied by the A14 road. Today the town's rail traffic is handled entirely by Bury St Edmunds railway station.

Preceding station	Disused railways	Following station
Welnetham; Line and station closed	Great Eastern Railway; Long Melford-Bury St Edmunds Branch	Bury St Edmunds; Line closed, station open
