= Welnetham railway station =

Former railway station in England

Coordinates: 52.1973°N 0.7745°E

Welnetham
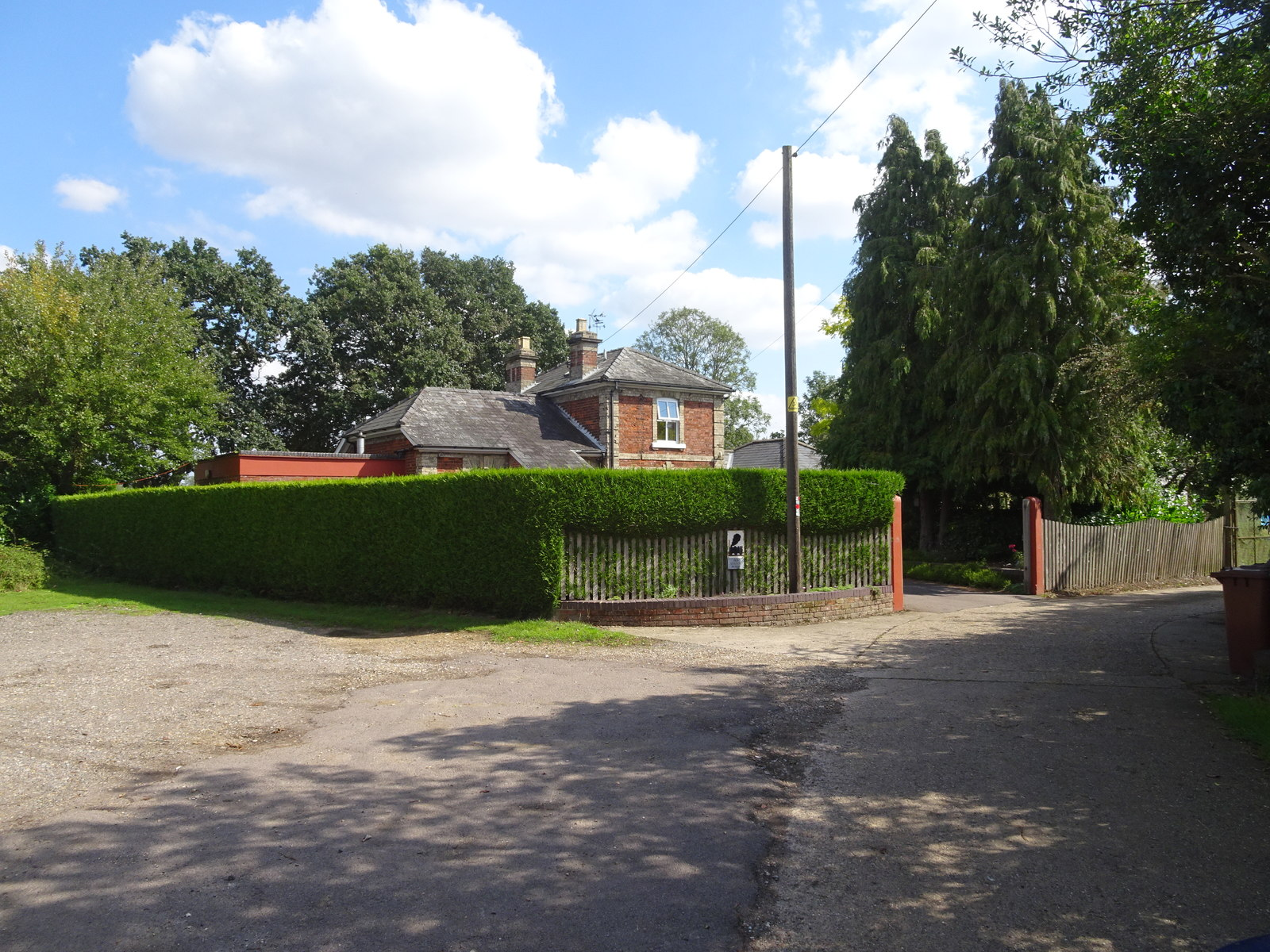
- Station in 2020.

General information
- Location: Welnetham, West Suffolk; England
- Platforms: 1

Other information
- Status: Disused

History
- Original company: Great Eastern Railway
- Pre-grouping: Great Eastern Railway
- Post-grouping: London and North Eastern Railway

Key dates
- 9 Aug 1865: Opened
- 10 Apr 1961: Closed for passengers
- 13 July 1964: closed for freight
Location

Welnetham railway station was on the Long Melford-Bury St Edmunds branch line, serving Great Whelnetham, Little Whelnetham and Sicklesmere in Suffolk. It opened in 1865 and closed in 1961; later it was converted into a private residence.

The "Welnetham" station sign is on display at the National Railway Museum in York.

| Preceding station | Disused railways | Following station |
|---|---|---|
| Cockfield; Line and station closed | Great Eastern Railway; Long Melford-Bury St Edmunds Branch | Bury St Edmunds Eastgate; Line and station closed |
