= Little Whelnetham =

Village in Suffolk, England

Coordinates: 52.206°N 0.763°E

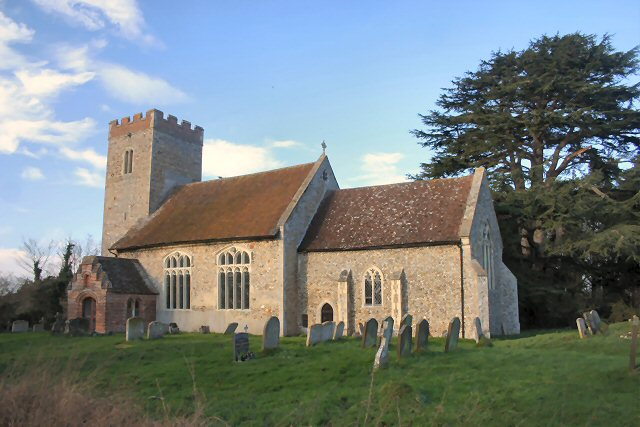
- St Mary Magdalene Church

- Location within Suffolk
- Population: 180 (2005); 188 (2011)
- District: West Suffolk
- Shire county: Suffolk
- Region: East
- Country: England
- Sovereign state: United Kingdom
- Post town: Bury St Edmunds
- Postcode district: IP30
- Police: Suffolk
- Fire: Suffolk
- Ambulance: East of England
- UK Parliament: Bury St Edmunds

Little Whelnetham (well-NEE-thum) (sometimes Little Welnetham) is a village and civil parish in the West Suffolk district of Suffolk in eastern England. Located around two miles south of Bury St Edmunds, in 2005 its population was 180.

The parish also contains part of the village of Sicklesmere, with which sister village Great Whelnetham is contiguous. Until the Beeching Axe, the area was served by Welnetham railway station on the Long Melford-Bury St Edmunds branch line.

== Church ==
The parish church of St Mary Magdalene is a medieval church whose origins are not precisely known. The tower seems typical of 14th century, and Pevsner dated it as such, but it may well be substantially older, with parts perhaps dating to the 12th century.

To the east of the church is four-metre structure of flint and rubble, almost certainly part of a circular tower and perhaps part of an earlier church.

== Priory ==
The area was formerly the site of the Priory of the Holy Cross, a monastic priory dedicated to Thomas Becket founded in 1274 and dissolved in 1538, though there is some doubt as to whether it was in Little Whelnetham or Great Whelnetham. A Tudor house in Little Whelnetham, The Crutched Friars, is believed to have been part of the priory and is now a private residence.

== Demography ==
According to the Office for National Statistics, at the time of the United Kingdom Census 2001, Little Whelnetham had a population of 188 with 76 households.

=== Population change ===
Population growth in Little Whelnetham from 1801 to 1891
Year	1801	1811	1821	1831	1841	1851	1881	1891
Population	142	127	176	180	206	178	156	174
Source: A Vision of Britain Through Time

Population growth in Little Whelnetham from 1901 to 2001
Year	1901	1911	1921	1931	1951	1961	2001	2011
Population	138	118	123	137	138	111	184	188
Source: A Vision of Britain Through Time
