= Cockfield railway station =

Former railway station in England

Coordinates: 52.1559°N 0.7825°E

Cockfield
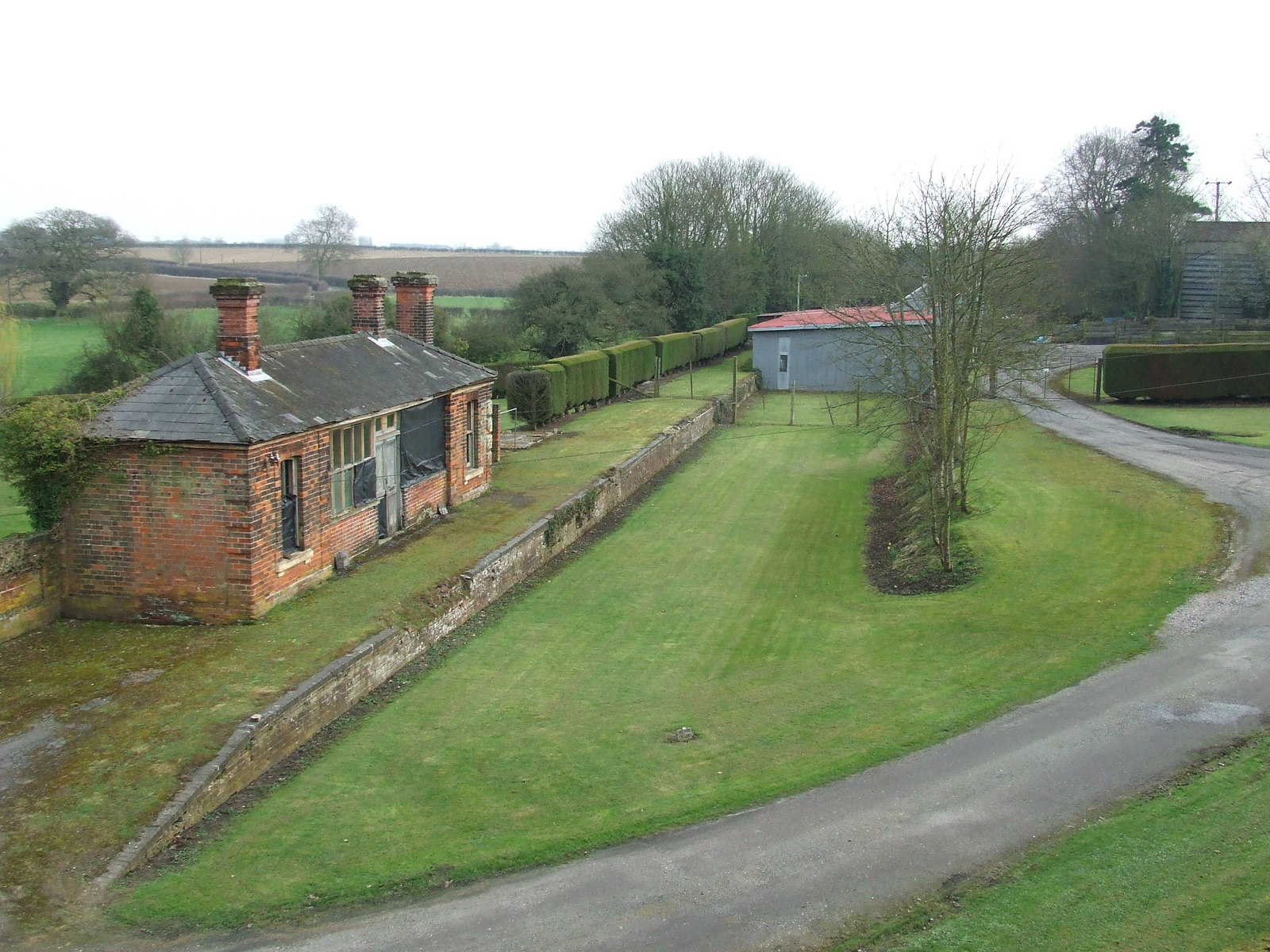
- The station in 2010

General information
- Location: Cockfield, Babergh; England
- Platforms: 1

Other information
- Status: Disused

History
- Pre-grouping: Great Eastern Railway
- Post-grouping: London and North Eastern Railway

Key dates
- 9 Aug 1865: Opened as Cockfield
- 1 Oct 1927: Renamed Cockfield (Suffolk)
- 10 Apr 1961: Closed for passengers
- 19 April 1965: closed for freight
Location

Cockfield railway station was on the Long Melford-Bury St Edmunds branch line in Cockfield, Suffolk.

The station building still stands, but is in a semi-derelict state.

Preceding station	Disused railways	Following station
Lavenham	Long Melford-Bury St Edmunds Branch	Welnetham
