= Windsor Green =

Hamlet in Suffolk, England

Coordinates: 52.1592°N 0.7674°E

Windsor Green is a hamlet in the civil parish of Cockfield, in the Babergh district of the county of Suffolk, England. It is about four miles away from the large village of Lavenham and about eleven miles away from the large town of Bury St Edmunds. For transport there is the A1141 road and the A134 road nearby.

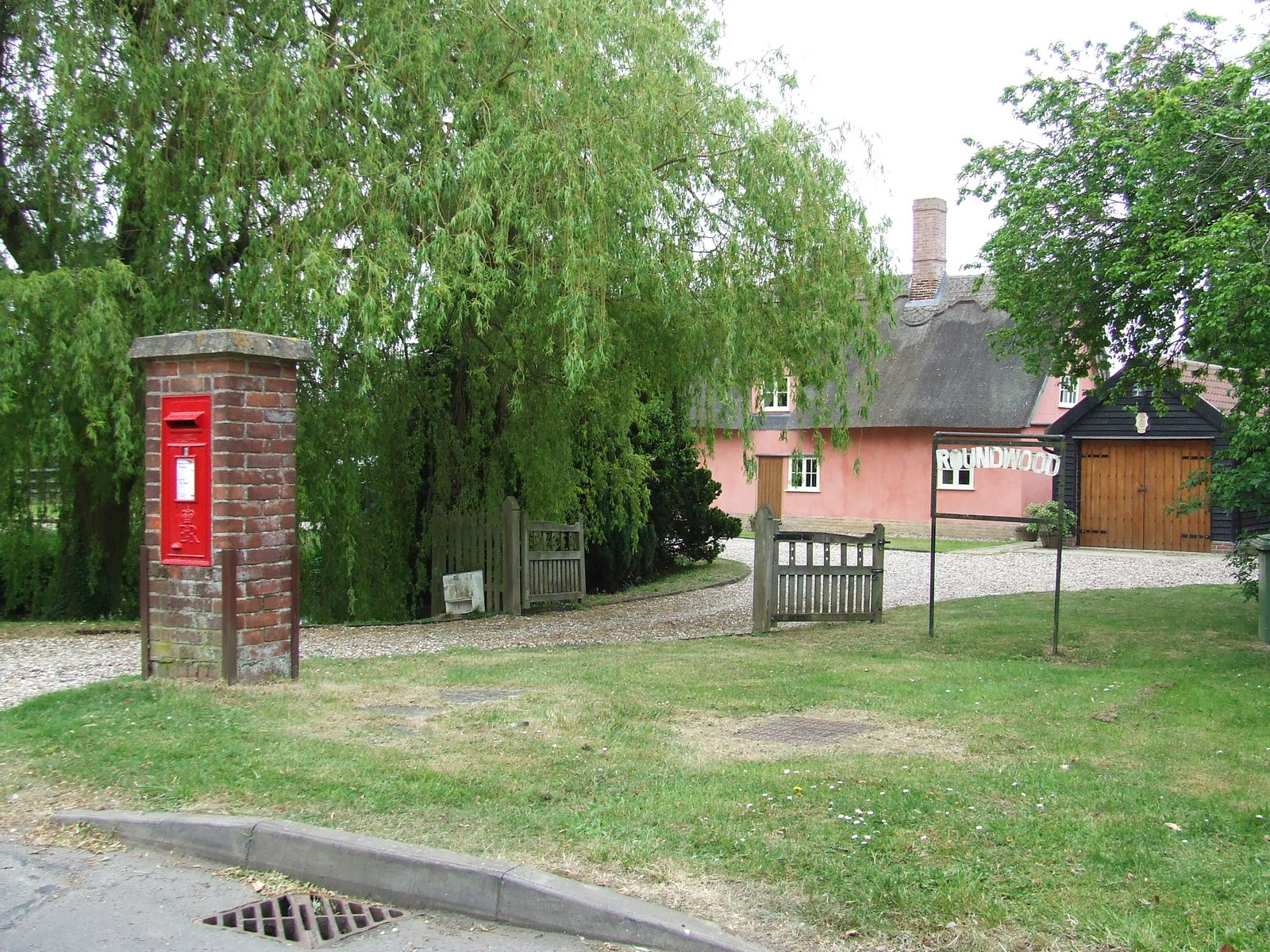
Windsor Green
