= Oldhall Green =

Hamlet in Suffolk, England

Coordinates: 52.17°N 00.76°E

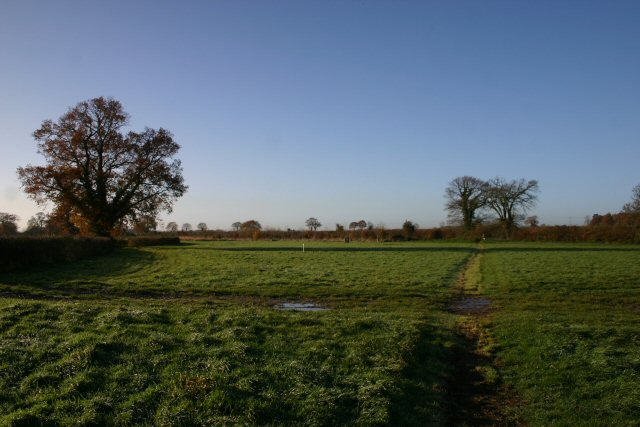

- Location within Suffolk
- OS grid reference: TL8956
- Civil parish: Cockfield
- District: Babergh
- Shire county: Suffolk
- Region: East
- Country: England
- Sovereign state: United Kingdom
- Police: Suffolk
- Fire: Suffolk
- Ambulance: East of England

Oldhall Green is a hamlet in the civil parish of Cockfield, in the Babergh district, in the county of Suffolk, England. It is near the A1141 road between Lavenham and Bury St Edmunds. The Old Hall Green Farm was owned by Richard Hilder.
