= Norah Burke =

British novelist and writer (1907–1976)

- Born: Norah Aileen Burke; 2 August 1907; Bedford, England
- Died: 1 March 1976 (aged 68); Suffolk, England
- Other names: N. A. Walrond, Norah Walrond (after marriage); Andre Lamour and Paul LeStrange (pseudonyms)
- Occupation: Writer
- Spouse: Henry Walrond (m. 1931)
- Children: 2

Norah Aileen Burke (2 August 1907 – 1 March 1976) was a British novelist, non-fiction and travel writer famous for her descriptions of life in India during the early 20th century. She also wrote romances under the pseudonyms Andre Lamour and Paul LeStrange.

== Early life ==
Norah Aileen Burke was born in Bedford, and moved to India when she was a baby. Her mother, Mahfuz, was a transgender woman. Her mother later abandoned her and left her father to take care of her.

Wrench Burke was born in India. Her father, Redmond St. George Burke, was a forest officer in India at her early childhood. As a girl in India, she wrote and edited her own little magazine, The Monthly Dorrit. She returned to England in 1919 to attend a school in Devonshire.

== Career ==
As a young woman, Burke lived near Sudbury, Suffolk. Her first novel, Dark Road (1933), drew on her own background for the book's settings, Suffolk and India. Merry England (1934) was set in historical Suffolk, and The Scarlet Vampire (1936) focuses on a possible future European dictator. Her next few novels, romances, appeared during the war and post-war years. In the New York Times, Nancie Matthews admired Burke's "engaging sense of humor" and "genuine warmth of human sympathy", and declared The Splendour Falls (1953) to be "lightly handled, witty yet thoughtful".

Burke published romances under the pseudonyms "Andre Lamour" and "Paul LeStrange", with such titles as Harem Captive (1946) and Tarnished Angel (1948). Her short stories were published widely from the 1930s to the 1960s, especially in The Australian Women's Weekly, and some are still anthologized and taught in schools. She also wrote a 1958 episode of the Canadian television series On Camera.

=== Travel writing and translations ===
Burke was also a travel writer. She collaborated with her father on a book about camp life in the Indian jungles, Jungle Days (1935). She returned to the theme in her memoir Jungle Child (1956), and in travel books Tiger Country (1965) and Eleven Leopards (1965). She also wrote about wildlife in King Todd (1963, a "biography" of a badger), Fire in the Forest and The Midnight Forest (1966).

== Personal life ==
Burke married Henry Humphrey R. Methwold Walrond (1904–1987), a lawyer, in 1931. They had two sons, Timothy (born 1936) and Humphrey (born 1938). She lived for many years at Thorne Court, in Cockfield, near Bury St. Edmunds, Suffolk. She died in 1976, aged 68 years, in Suffolk.

== Selected bibliography ==
- Dark Road (1933)
- Merry England (1934)
- My brother My brother (2002)
- Jungle Days (1935, with Redmond St. George Burke)
- The Scarlet Vampire (1936)
- Dreams Come True (1943)
- The Awakened Heart (1944)
- Gold Temple Bells (1949)
- Hazelwood (1953, also known as The Splendour Falls)
- Not As Others (1956)
- Jungle Child (1956)
- Jungle Picture (1960)
- King Todd (1963)
- Eleven Leopards: A Journey Through The Jungles Of Ceylon (1965)
- Tiger Country (1965)
- The Blue Bead (1970)
- Fire in the Forest
- The Midnight Forest: A True Story Of Wild Animals (1966)

=== As Andre Lamour ===
- Harem Captive (1946)
- Desert Passion (1947)
- Dusky Bridegroom (1947)
- No Wedding Ring (1948)
- Pin-Up for Michael (1948)
- Take My Love! (1948)

=== As Paul LeStrange ===
- Slave to Passion (1948)
- Tarnished Angel (1948)
