= Sicklesmere =

Village in Suffolk, England

Coordinates: 52.210°N 0.748°E

- Location within Suffolk
- Shire county: Suffolk
- Region: East
- Country: England
- Sovereign state: United Kingdom
- Post town: Bury St Edmunds
- Postcode district: IP30

Sicklesmere is a village in Suffolk, England. Located on the A134 around a mile south of Bury St Edmunds, the village is divided between the civil parishes of Little and Great Whelnetham .

== History ==
All spellings of the name until the seventeenth century are with -d-, starting with Sidulfes mere circa 1100. The purported 1272 spelling Sykolvesmere, in W. Rye, A Calendar of the Feet of Fines for Suffolk (1900) is an error by Rye; the manuscript of the fine in the National Archives actually has Sydolvesm[er]e. The village is named after a mere or lake that used to be present near the River Lark, and the first element is the Old English personal name *Siduwulf, not a Norse name (Keith Briggs and Kelly Kilpatrick, A dictionary of Suffolk place-names, Nottingham: EPNS & SIAH 2016, page 122). In truth it is no more than a small cluster of properties besides the River Lark. Many of these are flint-built cottages.

A circular-shaped building known as the Toll House is located on the main road. In the days of coach travel there was a regular service between Norwich and London via Sudbury which ran four times a day through Sicklesmere. The village was also previously served by Welnetham railway station until the Beeching Axe.

The village has a pub, the Rushbrooke Arms.

== Gallery ==
River Lark at Sicklesmere

The Rushbrooke Arms

Village Store
