= Churchill Babington =

English scholar, archaeologist and naturalist (1821–1889)

Rev. Churchill Babington
- Born: 11 March 1821; Rothley Temple, Leicestershire
- Died: 12 January 1889 (aged 67)
- Education: St John's College, Cambridge
- Father: Matthew Drake Babington
- Relatives: Cardale Babington (cousin)
- Scientific career
- Fields: Classical scholar, archaeologist and naturalist
- Workplaces: Horningsea, near Cambridge; Cockfield, Suffolk; Cambridge
- Author abbrev. (botany): C.Bab.

Churchill Babington (/ˈbæbɪŋtən/; 11 March 1821 – 12 January 1889) was an English classical scholar, archaeologist and naturalist. He served as Rector of Cockfield, Suffolk. He was a cousin of Cardale Babington.

== Life ==
He was born at Rothley Temple, in Leicestershire, the only son of Matthew Drake Babington. He was a scion of the Babington family. He was first educated by his father, and then studied under Charles Wycliffe Goodwin, the orientalist and archaeologist. In 1839, he followed his cousin, Cardale, to St John's College, Cambridge and graduated in 1843, seventh in the first class of the classical tripos and a senior optime. In 1845 he obtained the Hulsean Prize for his essay The Influence of Christianity in promoting the Abolition of Slavery in Europe. In 1846, he was elected to a fellowship and took orders. He proceeded to the degree of M.A. in 1846 and D.D. in 1879. From 1848 to 1861, he was vicar of Horningsea, near Cambridge, and from 1866 to his death he was vicar of Cockfield in Suffolk. From 1865 to 1880, he held the Disney professorship of archaeology at Cambridge. In his lectures, illustrated from his own collections of coins and vases, he dealt chiefly with Greek and Ancient Roman pottery and numismatics.

Babington wrote on a variety of subjects. His early familiarity with country life gave him a taste for natural history, especially botany and ornithology. He was also an authority on conchology. He collected on field trips along with many others including Edward Byles Cowell. He was among the few to record the endangered eskimo curlew in England. He was the author of the appendices on botany (in part) and ornithology in Potter's History and Antiquities of Charnwood Forest (1842). In 1853, he was elected a Fellow of the Linnean Society. The lichen species Sticta babingtonii is named after him.

His family was connected with that of the Macaulays and he wrote Mr Macaulay's Character of the Clergy (1849), a defence of the clergy of the 17th Century, which received the approval of Gladstone. He also brought out the editio princeps of the speeches of Hypereides Against Demosthenes (1850), On Behalf of Lycophron and Euxenippus (1853) and his Funeral Oration (1858). It was by his edition of these speeches from the papyri discovered at Thebes (Egypt) in 1847 and 1856 that Babington's fame as a Greek scholar was made.

In 1855, he published an edition of Benefizio della Morte di Cristo, a remarkable book of the Reformation period, attributed to Paleario, of which nearly all the copies had been destroyed by the Inquisition. Babington's edition was a facsimile of the editio princeps published at Venice in 1543, with an Introduction and French and English versions. He also edited the first two volumes of Higden's Polychronicon (1858) and Bishop Pecock's Represser of Overmuch Blaming of the Clergy (1860); Introductory Lecture on Archaeology (1865); Roman Antiquities found at Rougham (1872); Catalogue of Birds of Suffolk (1884–1886); Flora of Suffolk (with William Marsden Hind, 1889), etc. He catalogued the classical manuscripts in the University Library and the Greek and English coins in the Fitzwilliam Museum.

He died of rheumatic fever and was survived only by his widow, daughter of Colonel John Alexander Wilson.

== See also ==
- Category:Taxa named by Churchill Babington

== Sources ==
- Seccombe, Thomas (1901). "Babington, Churchill" . In Lee, Sidney (ed.). Dictionary of National Biography (1st supplement). Vol. I. London: Smith, Elder & Co.

Academic offices
Preceded by John Marsden	Disney Professor of Archaeology, Cambridge University; 1865–1879	Succeeded by Percy Gardner
