= Long Melford railway station =

Former railway station in England

Coordinates: 52.0660°N 0.7109°E

Long Melford
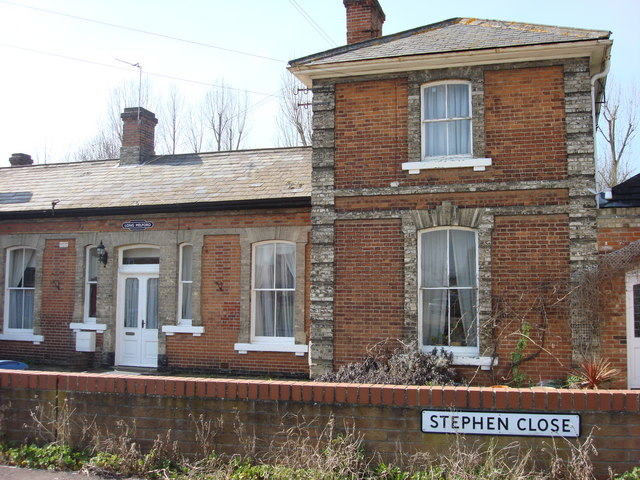
- The former station in 2007

General information
- Location: Long Melford, Babergh; England
- Platforms: 2

Other information
- Status: Disused

History
- Pre-grouping: Great Eastern Railway
- Post-grouping: London and North Eastern Railway

Key dates
- 9 August 1865: Opened as Melford
- 1 February 1884: Renamed Long Melford
- 6 March 1967: Closed
Location

Long Melford railway station is a disused station that served the village of Long Melford in Suffolk, England. It opened in 1865 as "Melford" and was renamed "Long Melford" in 1884. The station was on the Stour Valley Railway between Sudbury and Cambridge, operated by the Eastern Counties Railway, as well as a branch line between Long Melford and Bury St Edmunds. Services over the latter route ended in 1961 and the station and Stour Valley line closed in 1967 as part of the Beeching cuts. The station building is now a private residence.

A proposal to extend services by building a light railway between Long Melford and Hadleigh was reported in the Haverhill Echo on 10 March 1900, but was never built.

Preceding station	Disused railways	Following station
Glemsford; Line and station closed	Great Eastern Railway; Stour Valley Railway	Sudbury; Line and station closed
Terminus	Great Eastern Railway; Long Melford-Bury St Edmunds Branch	Lavenham; Line and station closed
