= Wickham trolley =

Railway engineering personnel carrier

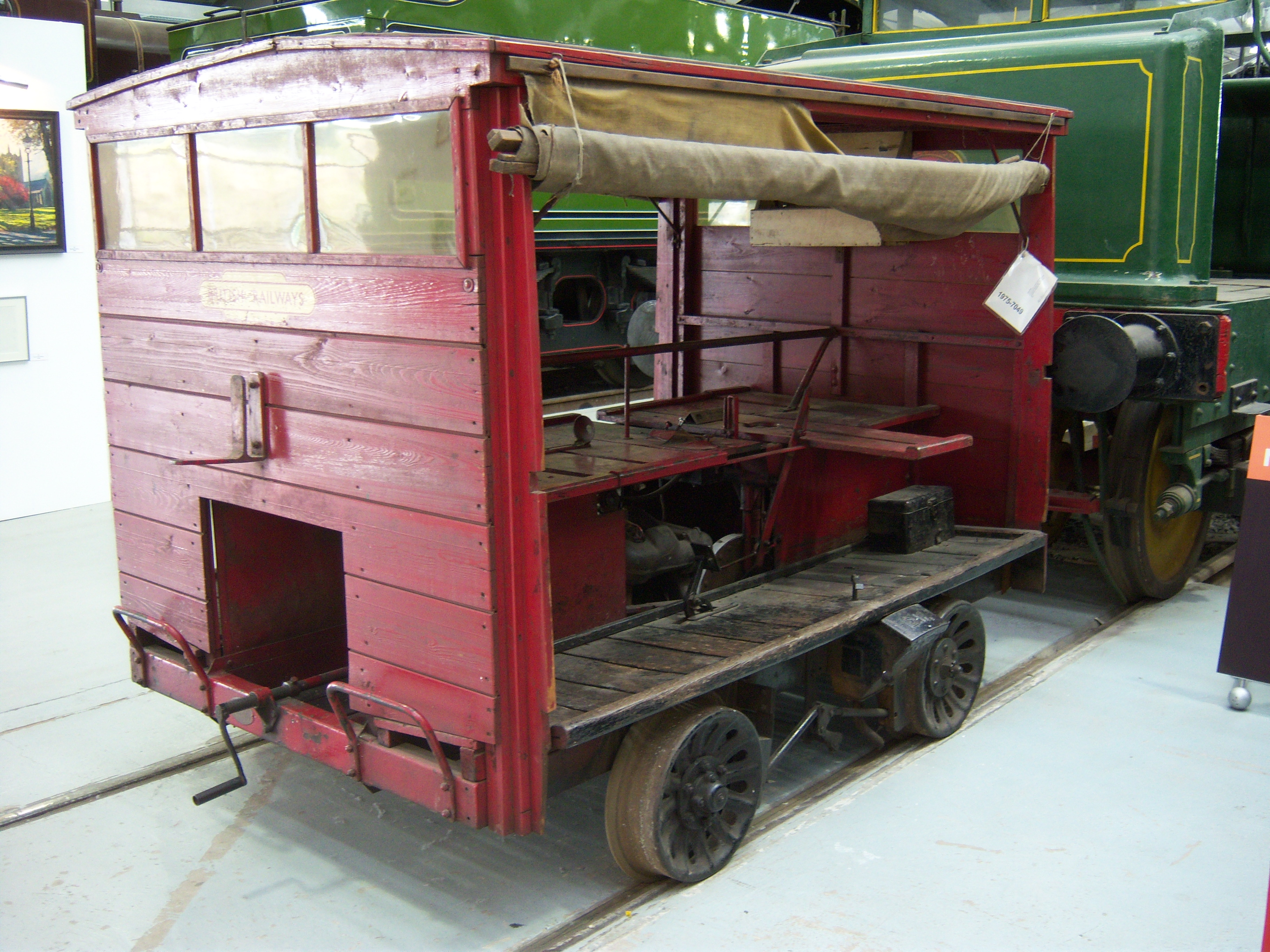
Standard gauge Wickham Trolley, at Locomotion museum, Shildon

The Wickham trolley was a railway engineering personnel carrier built by D. Wickham & Co of Ware, Hertfordshire. This long established firm introduced their rail trolley in 1922 as a lightweight track inspection and maintenance vehicle. This was a success and production of rail trolleys and railcars for inspection and maintenance continued until 1990.

== Company history ==
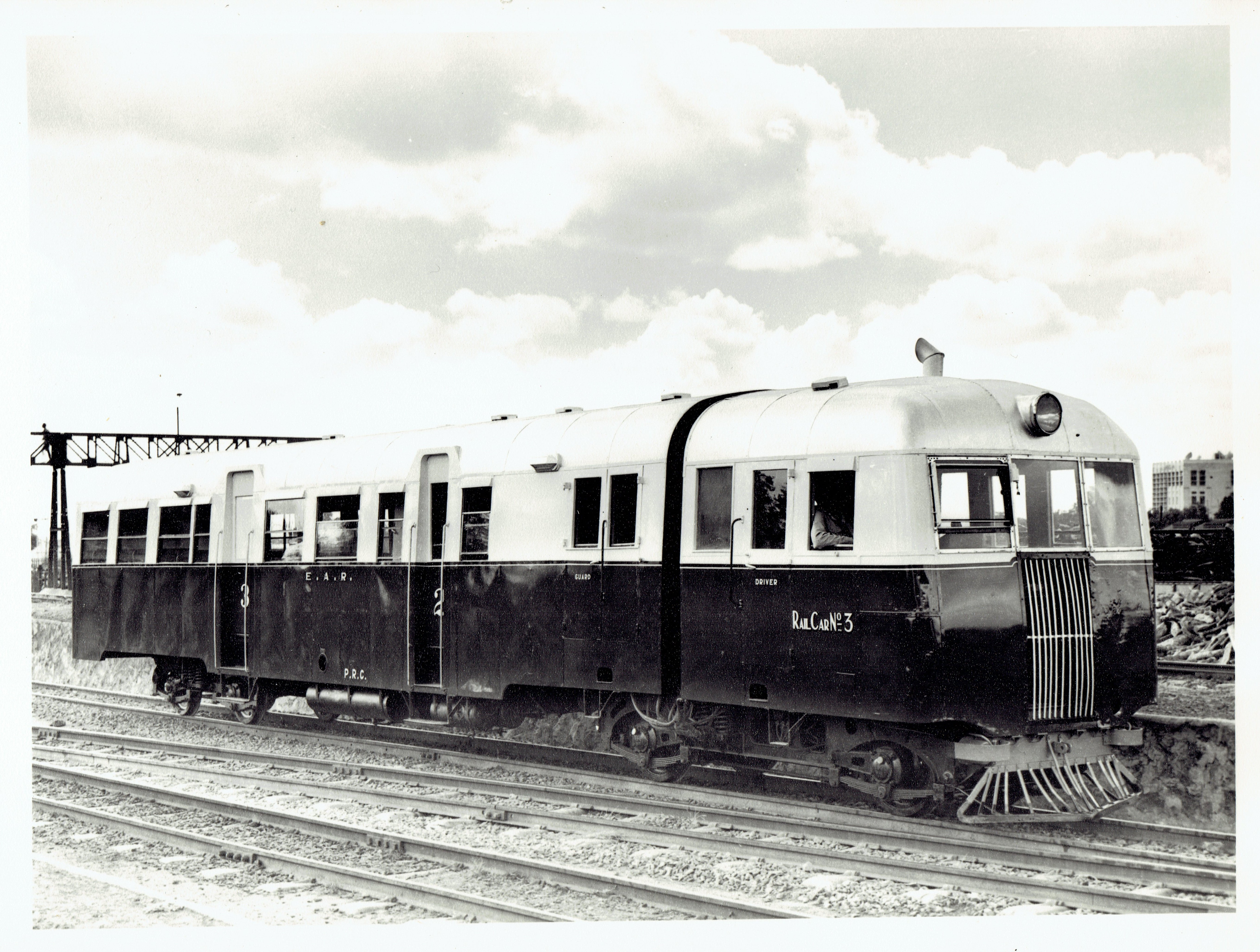
Wickham 2830 (East African Railways RailCar No 3)

Dennis Wickham founded the company in 1886 as Motor Car and General Engineers with workshops in Priory Street, Ware. He came from a brewing family and an early product was machinery for breweries. In 1900 they moved to larger premises at Viaduct Road at the entrance to Crane Mead next to the river. The area was later redeveloped for town houses and was renamed Wickham Wharf. Dennis Wickham died in 1910, but the business continued and flourished. The company operated as D Wickham & Co. Ltd of Ware & Stevenage (Hertfordshire, UK), Wickham Rail Ltd of Suckley & Bishop's Frome (Worcestershire, UK), and Wickham Rail Cars of Goodyear (Arizona, USA).

Early products and services provided by D Wickham & Co included castings (e.g. manhole covers), brewery equipment, and car repairs. The rail trolley idea started in the 1920s, but sales really took off in the 1930s with a large order from LNER, leading to their adoption across British Railways after it was formed in 1948. While the rail trolleys became their main product, Wickham provided many other products including railcars, coal-mine man-riding cars, steam cleaners, rail grinders, and hoists for building sites.

Railcars were also produced, mainly for export. Three 1,000 mm (3 ft 3 3/8 in) metre gauge 58-seat railcars were ordered by Kenya & Uganda Railway in 1939 (though not delivered until 1946 due to World War II). These were works numbers 2828–2830, and were used on the Kisumu-Butere branch line. Other users of Wickham railcars were railways in Rhodesia, Colombia, Bolivia, Peru, Burma, Malaya, and North Borneo. For example, 47 were produced for Malayan Railways in 1963. The steel railways carriage frameworks were produced for Wickham by Metal Sections Ltd of Oldbury (a subsidiary of Tube Investments Ltd). The railcars were delivered in 'knocked-down' state for assembly in Malaya.

In the mid-1950s, Wickham produced five passenger diesel multiple units for British Rail (see British Rail Class 109 for details), of which one survived into preservation. These were of an unusual lightweight design with no separate chassis, but there were no further orders for these from British Rail. Wickham also produced five 4-wheel railbuses. A similar Wickham product for British Railways was the Elliot Track Recording Coach (DB999507). Produced to the designs of Elliot Brothers of London in 1958, this was designed for high-speed track measurement. It was last used in 1991, and was sold into preservation in 1997.

== Wickham Rail Trolleys ==
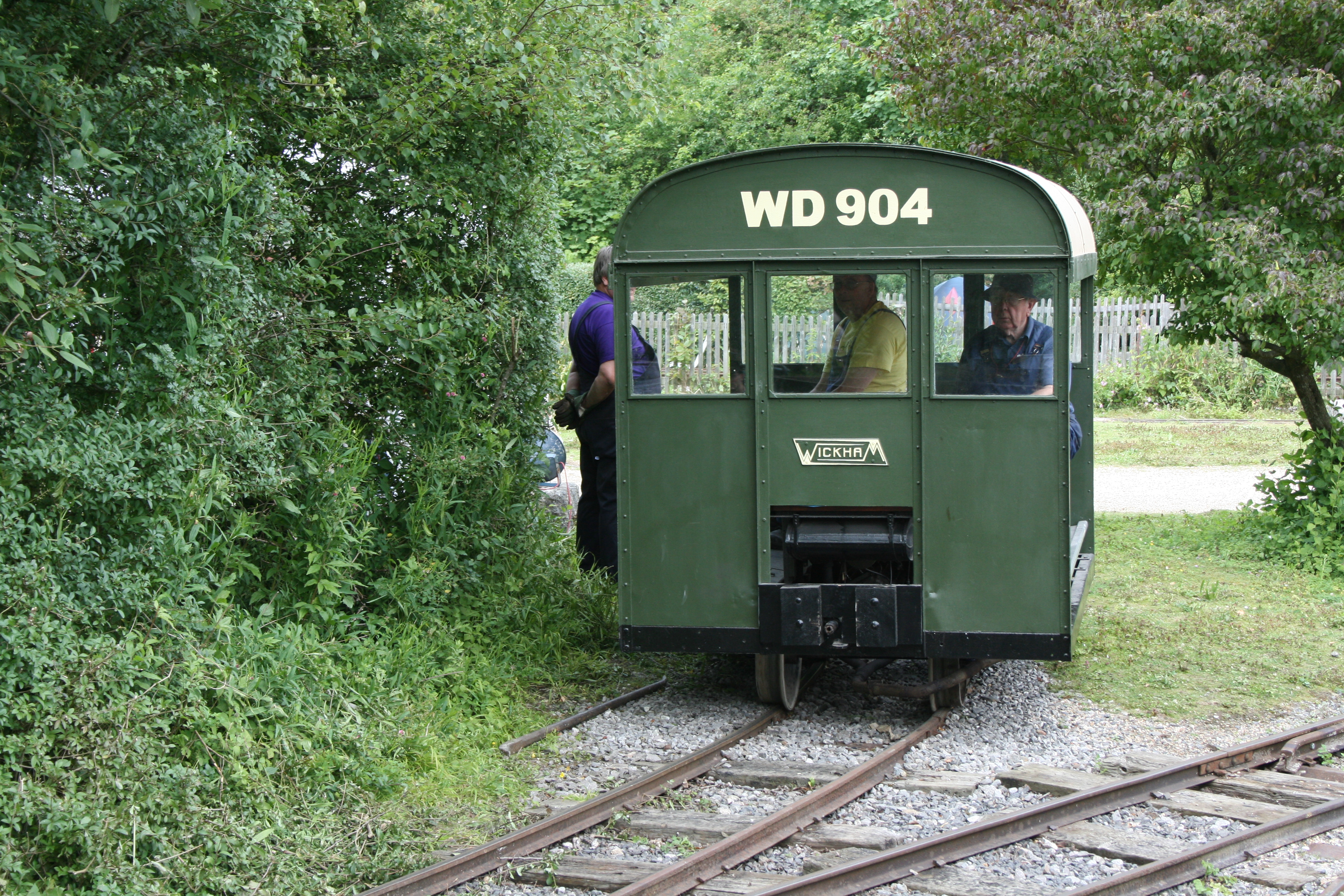
An ex-MOD narrow gauge Wickham trolley at the Amberley Museum Railway, Sussex

Wickham built their first railcar in April 1922 for the 3 ft 6 in (1,067 mm) gauge Taltal Railway in Chile. This was powered by a Dorman engine, and had two transverse bench seats with reversible backrest so the occupants could face forward when travelling in either direction. Although bearing works number 1, it was classed as a Type 10 rail trolley.

Most early models of the permanent-way maintenance ganger's trolley used a single-cylinder or vee-twin air-cooled JAP engine. This drove through a large flat flywheel and a friction drive.

On larger models, a standard four-cylinder motor car engine (such as the Ford E93A and later Ford 105E) provided power through a standard three-speed gearbox to a final chain-drive transfer gearbox which included the forward and reverse selection. The last of these was outsourced in 1991. Nearly 12,000 vehicles of many varieties were produced to their designs, including a few railcars built by their successors in the 1990s.

=== Trolley types ===
Wickham trolleys were made in several different "types"—though the basis of the type designations is not clear, with the very first trolley produced being type 10. Within a type designation different body styles were available, either as a gang trolley with quick in and out access, or as an inspection saloon with protection from the elements. Within the different types, there were variations indicated by a Mark number, e.g. Type 27 Mk III.

- Type 4 Inspection and Gang Trolleys (petrol or diesel)—available as open (A), open with windscreen (B), or semi-open (C)
- Type 5R Lightweight demountable trolley (petrol)
- Type 8S(B) Light inspection car—two-seater
- Type 8S(BB) Light inspection car—four-seater back-to-back
- Type 10—The very first car made in 1922 was classed as type 10. Open with 4 transverse bench seats.
- Type 17—Early medium-duty 1,100 cc JAP LTZ engine
- Type 17A—Early medium duty 1,323 cc JAP DTZ engine
- Type 18A Heavy duty gang trolley —Open or canvas sides
- Type 18A Heavy duty inspection car—fully enclosed
- Type 27 Medium duty open trolley
- Type 27A Medium duty gang trolley—Open-sided, but with windscreen, roof, and side curtains.
- Type 30 Saloon inspection car —fully enclosed
- Type 40 Large saloon inspection car
- Type 42 Large saloon inspection car and officials' luxury saloons

This list is almost certainly incomplete, and the system used for numbering is not self-evident, though smaller trolleys generally have smaller "type" designations.

In later years, Wickham added crane cars to its range of rail maintenance vehicles. This info taken from manufacturers brochures.

- Type CT15C Enclosed or semi-open cab for 4. Four-cylinder diesel. Hydraulic crane lifting to 670 kg. Trailer load to 35 tons.
- Type CT30C Enclosed cab for 3. Six-cylinder diesel. Hydraulic crane lifting to 3,500 kg. Payload 6.5 tons, trailer load up to 180 tons.
- Type CT40C Enclosed cab for 3. Six-cylinder diesel. Hydraulic crane lifting to 3,500 kg. Payload 5 tons, trailer load up to 9 tons. Available without the crane as type CT40.
- Type CT50C—Various cab designs for up to 16 persons. Hydraulic crane of various capacities available. Six-cylinder diesel. Payload 10 tons, trailing load 200 tons.

=== London and North Eastern Railway ===
In the early 1930s, the London and North Eastern Railway bought a large number of type-17 rail trolleys. Many of these survived into nationalisation in 1948, and survivors from the LNER make up the main part of the surviving pre-war trolleys.

=== British Railways ===
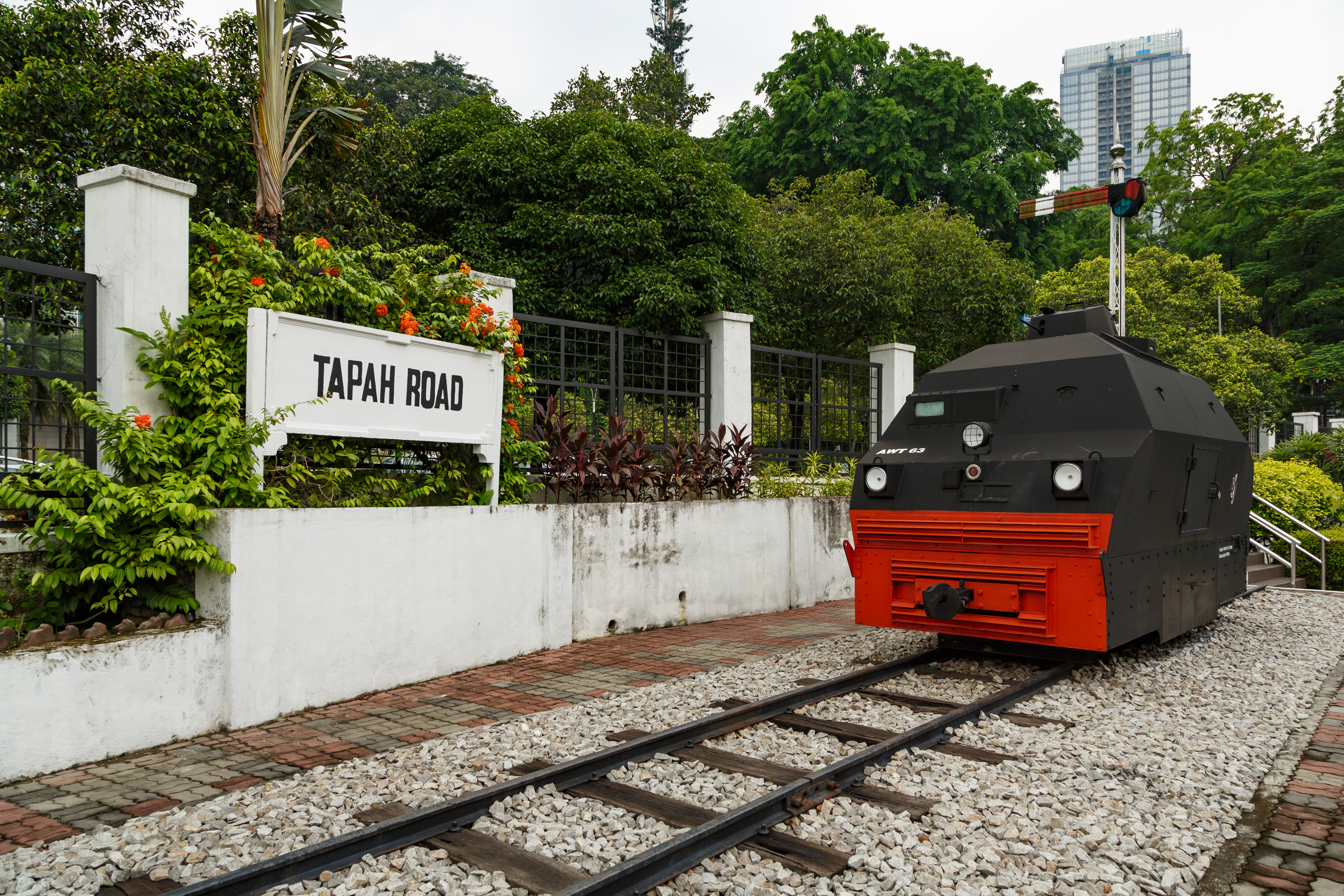
A 1952 Wickham Armoured Trolley at the Royal Malaysian Police Museum in Kuala Lumpur.

One of the best-known versions was that used on British Railways as the type No. 27 Gang and Inspection trolley. It was introduced in 1948, and over 600 were built between then and 1990.

Some versions did away with the rear passenger-carrying area and used this section for tools and even a diesel generator or air compressor. It was capable of pulling a trailer wagon with tools, but was then restricted to a two-man crew.

In addition to the departmental trolleys, larger railcars built for British Rail included:

- British Rail Railbuses
- British Rail Class 109

=== Military trolleys ===
Type 27

Twenty-five Type 27 trolleys went to the Ministry of Supply and the Ministry of Defence between 1954 and 1960. One was featured the in 1966 film The Great St Trinian's Train Robbery, filmed in part on the Longmoor Military Railway.

Wickham Armoured Trolley

A total of 42 units of an armoured version were produced in 1952 for use by the British Army and security forces during the Malayan Emergency, intended to prevent sabotage of narrow-gauge rail lines by communist insurgents. The trolley was armed with a machine-gun turret from a Ferret or Alvis Saracen armoured car. South Vietnam acquired several units and deployed to protect rail lines in the country starting around 1962. Several examples are preserved in the Royal Malaysian Police Museum, the National Army Museum, Port Dickson, and the Tunku Abdul Rahman Memorial in Kuala Lumpur.

Target trolleys

Wickham made trolleys adapted for the military as unmanned target trolleys. This was a development started in 1938 for use on the Lydd Ranges in Kent. The design went through several changes, particularly in regard to governing the speed so it was not affected by wind and other factors. The design was finalised in 1941, and 255 were produced for firing ranges all over UK and abroad. The development resulted in trolleys that were armoured (to protect them from shrapnel), powered by a 1,323 cc V-twin JAP engine with fluid-flywheel transmission. They were used to carry tank silhouettes along narrow-gauge track on artillery ranges to allow anti-tank training. The speed was controlled by a governor, and the vehicles had no reverse gear as they were operated on closed-loop tracks. The trolleys were protected from direct artillery fire by virtue of the tracks being in a cutting or behind a protective embankment. The regulated speed of the target trolleys could be changed by ramps placed between the tracks, the speed changes of the target providing more of a challenge on the artillery range.

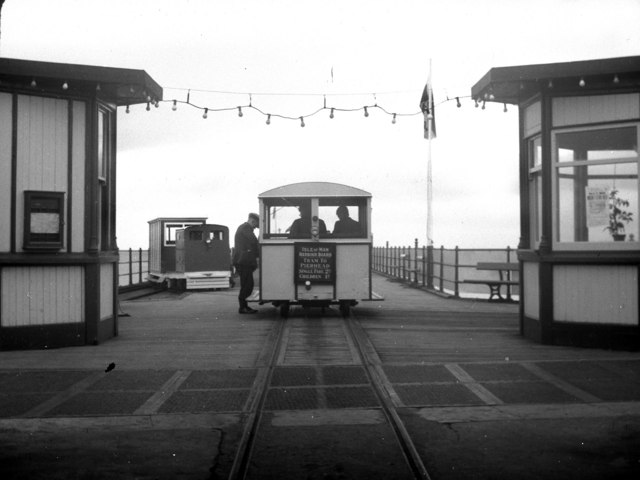
Queen's Pier Trolley

=== Isle of Man ===
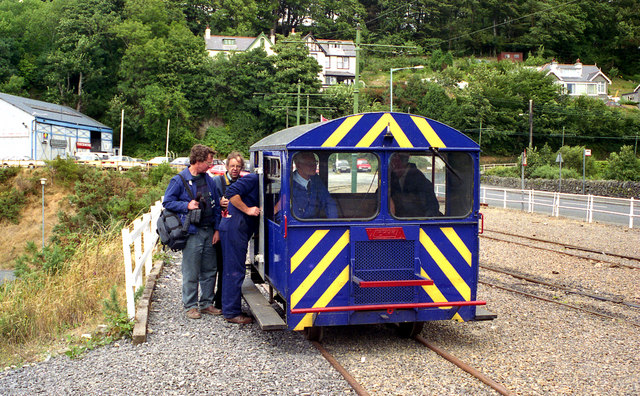
Wickham Railcar, Laxey

There are two extant railcars based on the Isle of Man Railway, one of which is in operational condition and based at Douglas railway station, used for annual transport galas; the other vehicle is stored out of use at Castletown Station. These two examples are both 3 ft (914 mm) gauge. Further examples (of 3 ft 6 in (1,067 mm) gauge) were used on the Snaefell Mountain Railway by the Civil Aviation Authority to access masts at the summit, and one version with toastrack seating from the Queen's Pier Tramway in Ramsey which was to 3 ft (914 mm) gauge. This particular vehicle had open sides and was used in addition to a Planet petrol locomotive which remains extant at the Manx Transport Museum in Jurby whilst the railcar was relocated to the Isle of Man Railway in 1975 to provide transport when the lines to Peel and Ramsey were lifted. It was later scrapped by the railway in 1978. At Jurby there is the remains of the Berm for a target railway as mentioned above in the section on military railways.

=== New Zealand ===
In New Zealand, two 4-man trolleys were built primarily as track inspection vehicles, one dedicated to each island.

== Preservation ==
It appears that none of the 1920s rail trolleys have survived, though several pre-war and WWII models exist (see list below). Wickham provided both powered and unpowered examples (trailers). Some of the older powered examples have been reduced to trailers. Post-war examples are much more numerous, and many are still in use on preserved railways.

Note; this list is incomplete.

Works no.	Build date	Model	Engine	Gauge	Preserved at	Notes
417	1931	Type 17		1,435 mm (4 ft 8 1/2 in)	North Yorkshire Moors Railway	Dismantled; currently just a rail trailer.
Unknown	1931	Type 17	JAP 1,100 cc	1,435 mm (4 ft 8 1/2 in)	Rail Trolley Trust. Currently being restored.	Originally LNER 9000312.
496	1932	Type 17	JAP 1,100 cc	1,435 mm (4 ft 8 1/2 in)	Privately Owned, Chasewater Railway	Originally LNER, York 900331.
497	1932	Type 17	JAP 1,100 cc	1,435 mm (4 ft 8 1/2 in)	The Rail Trolley Trust Collection, Chasewater	Originally LNER, York 900332.
590	1932	Type 17	JAP 1,100 cc	1,435 mm (4 ft 8 1/2 in)	Tanat Valley Light Railway	Originally LNER, York 950021. Engine upgraded to 1,323 cc. Retired by BR 1972.
730	1932	Type 17		1,435 mm (4 ft 8 1/2 in)	Eden Valley Railway	Originally LNER, York. Currently dismantled to only a trailer.
899	1933	Type 17		1,435 mm (4 ft 8 1/2 in)	National Railway Museum	Originally LNER, Chappel, Essex.
1288	1933	Type 17		1,435 mm (4 ft 8 1/2 in)	Strathspey Railway	Originally LNER. Stored off-track 2013, Boat of Garten.
1519	1934	Type 17		1,435 mm (4 ft 8 1/2 in)	Living Ironstone Museum, Cottesmore	Originally LNER
1543	1934	Type 17	1,100 cc JAP V-twin	1,435 mm (4 ft 8 1/2 in) (now 2 ft (610 mm))	Ffestiniog Railway	Originally LNER. Re-gauged for FR in 1961.
1580	1934	Type 17	JAP V-twin	1,435 mm (4 ft 8 1/2 in)	Severn Valley Railway	Originally LNER, Whittlesea. Operational.
1642	1934	Type 17	JAP	1,435 mm (4 ft 8 1/2 in)	Nene Valley Railway	Complete
1724	Dec 1934	Type 17	1,323 cc JAP twin	1,435 mm (4 ft 8 1/2 in)	Eden Valley Railway	Originally LNER, Crowle, Lincolnshire
1946	1935	Type 17A	JAP	1,435 mm (4 ft 8 1/2 in)	Colne Valley Railway	Originally LNER, Tiptree, Essex
2522	1938	R1300 Prototype Target Trolley	JAP	2 ft (610 mm)	Stored, in care of Leighton Buzzard Railway	Known during development as the "Wicked Queen"
2558	1939	R1293 Target Trolley	JAP	2 ft (610 mm)	Reading, Berkshire	Dismantled
2904	1940	Type 8S	JAP Single cylinder	2 ft 6 in (762 mm)	Welshpool and Llanfair Light Railway	Complete and on display
3030	1941	R1389 Target Trolley		600 mm (1 ft 11 5/8 in)	Rail Trolley Trust: Tanat Valley Light Railway	Lacks engine and transmission. Originally at Shoeburyness.
3031	1941	R1389 Target Trolley		2 ft (610 mm)	Old Kiln Light Railway	Rebuilt 1973 with Petter engine
3151	1942	R1389 Target Trolley		2 ft (610 mm)	Armourgeddon, Leicestershire	Static exhibit
3152	1943	R1389 Target Trolley		2 ft (610 mm)	Was at Caernarfon Air Museum	Ex Lydd ranges
3158	1943	Target Trolley		2 ft (610 mm)	Engine planned to go in Wickham 4131 of 1947.	
3161	1943	Target Trolley		2 ft (610 mm)	Amberley Chalk Pits Museum	Ex Lydd Ranges. Operational.
3164	1943	Target Trolley		2 ft (610 mm)	Embsay and Bolton Abbey Railway	Engine used to restore Wickham 7610 of 1957
3170	1943	R1389 Target Trolley	JAP 1,323 cc twin	2 ft (610 mm)	Rail Trolley Trust	Complete, at Statfold Barn Railway Museum, needing restoration
3236	1943	R1389 Target Trolley	JAP 1,323 cc twin	2 ft (610 mm)	Armourgeddon, Leicestershire	Static display
3282	1943	R1389 Target Trolley	JAP 1,323 cc twin	2 ft 6 in (762 mm)		Complete, in care of Leighton Buzzard Railway
3403	1943	Type 17A	JAP 1,323 cc twin	2 ft (610 mm)	Amberley Chalk Pits Museum	Ex MOD Eastriggs. Restored and operational
3404	1943	Type 17A trailer	None	2 ft (610 mm)	Amberley Chalk Pits Museum	Ex MOD Eastriggs. Restored and operational
6857	1954	Type 27 Mark III	Morris 13hp Industrial	1,435 mm (4 ft 8 1/2 in)	Chasewater Railway (Owned by the Rail Trolley Trust)	Ex MOD Longmoor. Running Number LMR 9033. Featured in two 1966 films. Wickham Order No. 54219
7504	1954	Type 27A MkIII	Reliant Robin 850 cc	1,435 mm (4 ft 8 1/2 in)	Somerset & Dorset Railway Heritage Trust	Restored and operational 2019 (original engine removed to restore Wickham 7505).
10707	1974	Type 18A Mark VI	Ford 2712E	1,435 mm (4 ft 8 1/2 in)	Mid Hants Railway (Watercress Line)	Restored and based at Medstead and Four Marks. Originally delivered to BR Civil Engineering Dept, Stewart’s Lane Battersea.
10839	1975	Type 18A Mark VI	Ford 2712E	1,435 mm (4 ft 8 1/2 in)	Mid Hants Railway (Watercress Line)	Restored and operational 2022. Based at Medstead and Four Marks. Originally BR Civil Engineering Dept, Stewart’s Lane Battersea.
unknown	unknown	unknown	unknown	1,435 mm (4 ft 8 1/2 in)	TaiPo Railway Museum, Hong Kong	Ex KCR.
68016	N/A	Type 17A	N/A	1,435 mm (4 ft 8 1/2 in)	Helston Railway	Under Restoration

== Cultural references ==
Wickham trolley No. WD9033 features in the 1966 comedy film The Great St Trinian's Train Robbery and also in the 1966 film Runaway Railway (Children's Film Foundation).
