= Great Whelnetham =

Village in Suffolk, England

Coordinates: 52.206°N 0.751°E

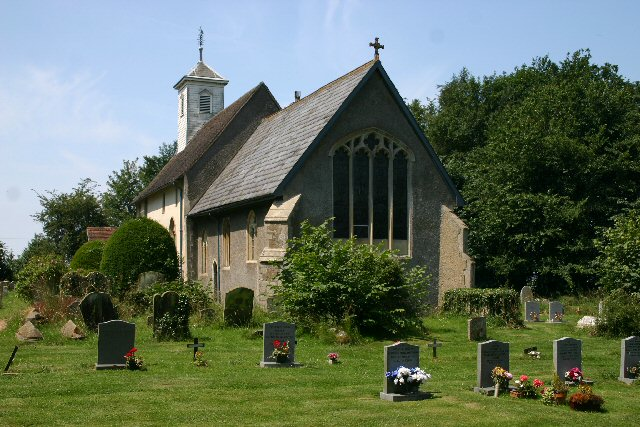
- Church of St Thomas à Becket

- Location within Suffolk
- Population: 820 (2005); 849 (2011)
- District: West Suffolk
- Shire county: Suffolk
- Region: East
- Country: England
- Sovereign state: United Kingdom
- Post town: Bury St Edmunds
- Postcode district: IP30
- Police: Suffolk
- Fire: Suffolk
- Ambulance: East of England

Great Whelnetham (sometimes Great Welnetham) is a village and civil parish in the West Suffolk district of Suffolk in eastern England. Located around two miles south of Bury St Edmunds, in 2005 its population was 820.

The parish also contains the hamlet of Cocks Green, and the village of Sicklesmere, with which Great Whelnetham is contiguous. Until the Beeching Axe, the area was served by Welnetham railway station on the Long Melford-Bury St Edmunds branch line.

In 2019, an excavation of a 4th-century Roman cemetery in Great Whelnetham uncovered unusual burial practices. Of 52 skeletons found, up to 40% had been decapitated, which archaeologists claimed gave new insight into Roman traditions. The burial ground includes the remains of men, women and children who likely lived in a nearby settlement. The decapitated skeletons represent "quite a rare find".

== Demography ==
According to the Office for National Statistics, at the time of the United Kingdom Census 2001, Great Whelnetham had a population of 830 with 349 households, increasing to 849 in 348 households at the 2011 Census.

=== Population change ===
Population change in Great Whelnetham from 1801 to 2011
| Year | 1801 | 1811 | 1821 | 1831 | 1841 | 1851 | 1881 | 1891 |
|---|---|---|---|---|---|---|---|---|
| Population | 222 | 266 | 399 | 422 | 514 | 552 | 440 | 362 |
| Year | 1901 | 1911 | 1921 | 1931 | 1951 | 1961 | 2001 | 2011 |
| Population | 357 | 366 | 359 | 315 | 442 | 444 | 830 | 849 |
Source: A Vision of Britain Through Time
