= British Rail Class 109 =

Class of diesel multiple train units

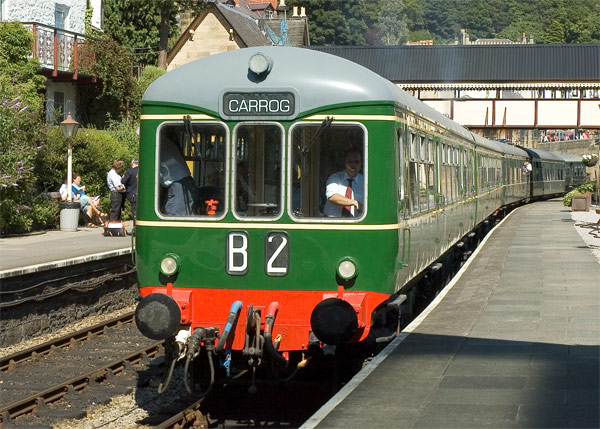
- Preserved unit 50416+56171
- In service: 1957–1971
- Manufacturers: D. Wickham and Company
- Family name: First generation
- Replaced: Steam locomotives and carriages
- Constructed: 1957–1958
- Number built: 5 sets
- Number preserved: 1 set
- Formation: 2-car sets: DMBS-DTCL
- Capacity: DMBS: 59 second, DTCL: 16 first, 50 second
- Operator: British Rail

Specifications
- Car length: 57 ft 0 in (17.37 m)
- Width: 8 ft 3 in (2.51 m)
- Height: 12 ft 4 1/2 in (3.77 m)
- Maximum speed: 70 mph (113 km/h)
- Weight: DMBS: 27 long tons 0 cwt (60,500 lb or 27.4 t); DTCL: 37 long tons 10 cwt (84,000 lb or 38.1 t)
- Prime mover: 2 x British United Traction Leyland
- Engine type: 6 cylinder horizontal
- Power output: 2 x 150 bhp (110 kW)
- Transmission: fluid coupling and air operated 4-speed epicyclic gear box
- UIC classification: 1A′A1′+2′2′
- Bogies: standard Derby 8 feet 6 inches (2.59 m) wheelbase
- Braking system: Vacuum
- Coupling system: Screw-link; British Standard gangways
- Multiple working: ■ Blue Square
- Track gauge: 4 ft 8 1/2 in (1,435 mm) standard gauge

The British Rail Class 109 is a class of 2-car diesel multiple units built in 1957 by D Wickham & Co. Five two-car units were built featuring an unusual body design. The design, first used in 1936 for South American railways, aimed to minimise weight. It had no underframe, but the whole body was formed into a welded stress-bearing box girder made of 1/8 inch (3.2 mm) solid drawn steel tube. Aluminium was used for panels, luggage racks, window frames, vacuum pipes and fuel and vacuum tanks. The corrugated steel floor was filled with sprayed asbestos and covered with asbestos-filled flame-proofed hardboard and rubber sheet.

The units soon became non-standard and two were sold back to the manufacturer who exported them to Trinidad and Tobago. Another unit was converted into departmental service, and survived in BR ownership until the early 1980s.

== Vehicle numbers ==
Orders and numbers of Class 109 cars
Lot No.	Diagram	Car Type	Qty	Fleet No.	Seating	Weight	Notes
30288	606	Driving Motor Brake Second (DMBS)	5	50415–50419	59 second	27 long tons 0 cwt (60,500 lb or 27.4 t)	
30289	607	Driving Trailer Composite with lavatory (DTCL)	5	56170–56174	16 first (2+2), 50 second (2+3)	22 long tons 10 cwt (50,400 lb or 22.9 t)	

== Further use ==
One two-car set (50416+56171) was extensively overhauled in 1967 at Doncaster, revamping the interiors and adding kitchen facilities to 50416. After repainting, the set was used as the ER General Managers special train, numbered 975005 / 975006.

== Preservation ==
One two-car unit, (see above) the former departmental unit, formed of vehicles 50416 and 56171, has been preserved and restored to working condition at the Llangollen Railway. It was restored using lottery money.

Set number	Vehicle numbers		Livery	Location	Notes
Set number	DMBS	DTCL	Livery	Location	Notes
-	50416	56171	BR Green	Llangollen Railway	Operational
