= Cockfield, Suffolk =

Village and civil parish in England

Coordinates: 52.1570°N 0.7840°E

Cockfield
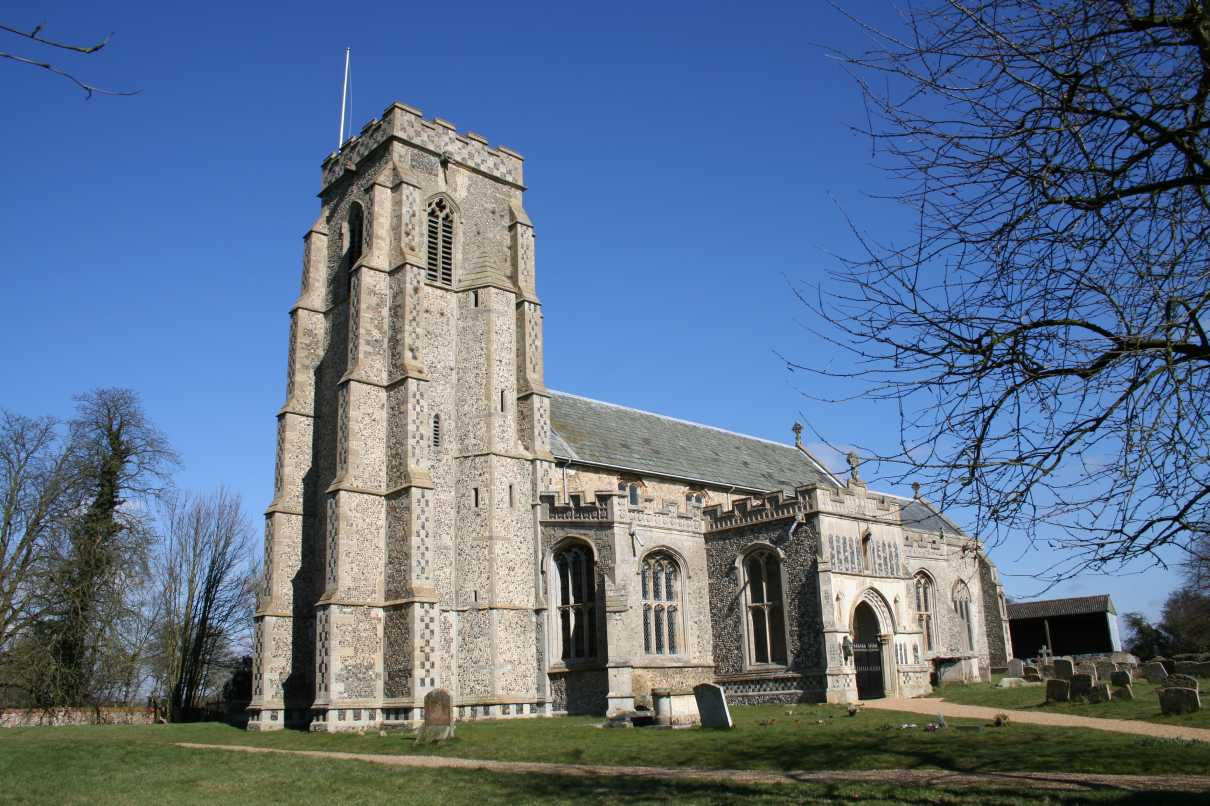
- St Peter's Church

- Location within Suffolk
- Population: 868 (2011)
- OS grid reference: TL905546
- District: Babergh
- Shire county: Suffolk
- Region: East
- Country: England
- Sovereign state: United Kingdom
- Post town: BURY ST EDMUNDS
- Postcode district: IP30
- Dialling code: 01284
- Police: Suffolk
- Fire: Suffolk
- Ambulance: East of England
- UK Parliament: South Suffolk

Cockfield is a village and civil parish located approximately 3 1/2 miles (5.6 km) from Lavenham in Suffolk, England. The village consists of a central point and several outlying hamlets: Buttons Green, Colchester Green, Cross Green, Great Green, Oldhall Green, Smithwood Green and Windsor Green. Surrounded mostly by fields used for farming, and with few roads, its population was 839 in 2001, increasing to 868 at the 2011 Census.

The village previously had a railway station on the Long Melford-Bury St Edmunds branch line, but it was closed in 1961 as part of the Beeching Axe. Its football team, Cockfield United, play in the Suffolk and Ipswich Football League.

== History ==
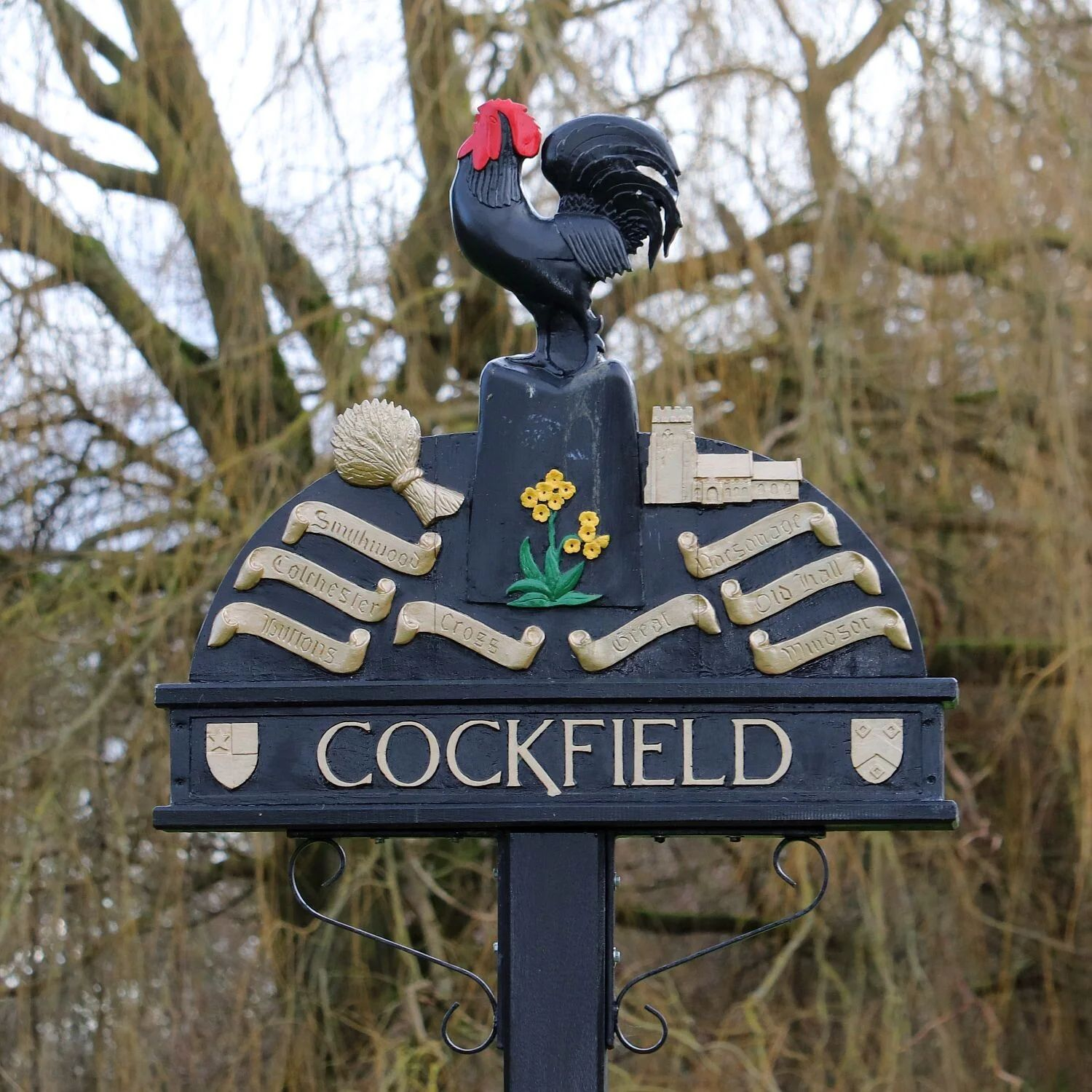
Cockfield village sign.

The present village has been inhabited for well over 2000 years. The finding of a sword (now in the Moyse Hall Museum in Bury St Edmunds) is evidence of Bronze Age settlement, and a number of findings indicate ancient defensive ditches, known as The Warbanks.

The name "Cockfield" is derived from the Old English "Cohha's open land", Cohha presumably being one of the first residents of the settlement. The village appeared in the Domesday Book of 1086 under the name of "Cothefelda" and is listed as a prosperous manor whose wealth had grown since the Norman Conquest. During the Middle Ages, the village became "Cokefield" and finally "Cockfield".

At some stage in the eleventh and twelfth centuries a castle was constructed within the village, mostly likely on the site of Old Cockfield hall, although the location is ultimately uncertain. The De Cockfield family were in possession of the site in the twelfth century, alongside other local castles at Groton and Lindsey. It was recorded in the late twelfth or early thirteenth century chronicle of Jocelin of Brakelond that the tower of Adam de Cockfield had been 'seven times twenty feet in height', and although not certain, this appears to refer to the site in Cockfield.

Cockfield became a centre of Puritanism during the 17th century. During the 19th century the parish was one of the largest and wealthiest in Suffolk and the seat of a number of prestigious rectors.

== St Peter's Church ==
A landmark visible for a distance across the neighbouring countryside, the church of St Peter's is one of the finest of Suffolk's many village churches, with the present building mostly dating from the 14th and 15th centuries. The church's size is unusual for such a rural location, but this becomes less surprising when one considers its location between the three great medieval merchant towns of Bury St Edmunds, Lavenham, and Sudbury.

There is no record of a church in the Domesday Book although a village of Cockfield's size would almost certainly have had one. The first surviving record of the parish's ecclesiastical history dates from 1190 when William de Cullum was installed as the first rector, although there is no existing record of the site prior to the building of the present church in the 14th century.

The church fell under the patronage of the Abbot of St Edmundsbury until the Reformation when the Spring family, wealthy Lavenham clothiers and noblemen, took over, resulting in a close link with the region's strong wool trade. From 1708 the patronage fell to St John's College, Cambridge who appointed a number of distinguished Fellows of the college. Rectors of St Peter's have included John Knewstub the Presbyterian, William Ludlam the mathematician, and Churchill Babington the archaeologist and botanist. In May 1582, an assembly of about 60 clergymen from Norfolk, Suffolk, and Cambridgeshire met in Cockfield Church to confer about the Prayer Book, clerical dress, and customs.

The church's sizeable square flint tower dates from the 14th century and is buttressed almost to the top.

== The village school ==
In the same road as the church is the village school, serving the village and surrounding communities. Children from the ages of four to nine attend the school. Find more information at the school website.

== Notable residents ==
- John Spring (?-1547), merchant and landowner around the 1540s.
- John Knewstub (1544–1624), clergyman and one of the participants in the Hampton Court Conference of 1604 representing the Puritan side.
- William Manning (1630?–1711), ejected minister and Unitarian writer.
- William Ludlam (1717–1788), clergyman and mathematician, rector of Cockfield.
- Churchill Babington (1821-1889), classical scholar, archaeologist and naturalist
- Norah Burke (1907-1976), novelist and travel writer.
