= Long Melford–Bury St Edmunds branch line =

Defunct railway in Suffolk, England

The Long Melford–Bury St Edmunds branch line was a railway between Long Melford on the Stour Valley Railway and Bury St Edmunds on the Ipswich to Ely Line. The line opened on 9 August 1865 and closed to passengers on 10 April 1961 and freight on 19 April 1965.

== Description ==
The line ran from Long Melford in the south to Bury St Edmunds with intermediate stations at Lavenham, Cockfield, Welnetham and Bury St Edmunds Eastgate. The surrounding land was agricultural and generally the villages it served were small.

| Village | Population 1903 |
|---|---|
| Welnetham | 73 |
| Cockfield | 854 |
| Lavenham | 2018 |

The line was single track with passing loops at Lavenham which had two platforms whilst Eastgate, Welnetham and Cockfield had single platforms.

Lavenham, Welnetham, Cockfield all had goods yards.

== History ==
=== Construction ===
The 1847 act of Parliament that resulted in the opening of the line between Marks Tey and Sudbury in 1849, had initially planned to extend to Clare and Bury St Edmunds where it would join the Ipswich and Bury Railway which had reached Bury St Edmunds in 1846. Construction difficulties between Marks Tey and Sudbury led to the scheme being abandoned once Sudbury was reached due to lack of funding.

In the late 1850s a new company known as the Sudbury & Clare Railway Company was formed and by act of Parliament of July 1860, they were empowered to build a line from Sudbury to Clare via Melford. Almost immediately the ECR took over and immediately sought extended powers in their act of Parliament of 1861 to build from Sudbury (via Melford) to Shelford on the London-Cambridge main line, as well as the branch from Melford to Bury St. Edmunds.

By the 1860s the railways in East Anglia were in financial trouble and most were leased to the Eastern Counties Railway (ECR). Although they wished to amalgamate formally, they could not obtain government agreement for this until 1862, when the Great Eastern Railway (GER) was formed by the amalgamation.

Work on the line begun in May 1863 and work progressed rapidly with a number of injuries to navvies and a death in July 1865. In January 1865 a contractors locomotive was delivered to Lavenham to assist with ballasting work.

=== Great Eastern Railway (1865-1922) ===
The line opened on 9 August 1865 along with the extended Stour Valley Railway route from Sudbury to Shelford. Some of the station buildings were not finished on opening.

Cockfield station opened 14 November 1870.

There was a derailment between Long Melford and Lavenham on 17 October 1891.

A press report in the Bury and Norwich Post newspaper on 20 October 1891 reported:

A passenger train which was passing between Bury and Melford and travelling at a high rate left the rails about two miles from Melford near Lineage Wood where the line has a sharp curve also a decline of 1 in 110. The land belongs to the Rev Sir William Hyde Parker on the west and to Earl Howe on the east. The engine without warning left the line turning a complete somersault and fell funnel downwards some 60 yards into the field. The Brake with the other carriages except a horse box left the metals and plunged down the embankment and capsizing on to their sides. The fearful jolting threw driver Harvey and his fireman from the footplate and doubtless saved their lives. The Westinghouse brake pulled the carriages up very quickly but not before them leaving the line. The foreman plate layer, George Smith, together with other lengthmen were at once conveyed to Ipswich and London. The cause is not absolutely certain but it is believed a heavy storm shifted some ballast on the line causing the rail to move. The engine is a No 169 (Note: No 169 was an 0-4-4T built by Neilson in 1873 to Samuel Johnson design and rebuilt by Adams) known as a tank engine and was running head foremost. The branch line had only four years ago been laid with 80lb steel rails. The engine driver Frederick Harvey and the stoker George Pamment live at Bury, the guard, George Rampling lives in Sudbury. No passengers were hurt. Quickly on the scene were Mr C.J.N.Row of Melford, a merchant and formerly stationmaster at Melford, Dr McNab of Bury, Mr Shean from Lavenham and Mr Pollintine the stationmaster from Lavenham.

The subsequent enquiry by the Board of Trade was reported again by the Bury and Norwich Post newspaper on 26 January 1892.

The official report on the railway accident on the Bury Melford line has been issued by the Board of Trade. Eight passengers were injured, two seriously, the driver and the guard. The Inspector attributed the accident not to the permanent way which was in good order but to the character of the engine which was one of a class that runs unsteadily when the chimney is in front and it is desirable and that there the balance weights on the leading and driving wheels must be restored. Drivers must be specially cautious and not to run at high speed when the chimney is in front.

In 1894 the minute book of the GER recorded the appointment of contractors to undertake bridge renewals on the route.

Bury Eastgate station closed in 1909 although it temporarily opened in July 1914 for the Suffolk Agricultural Show.

The line never enjoyed anything but the most rudimentary of services although in 1915 a reasonably healthy seven trains per day operated.

=== London & North Eastern Railway (1923-1947) ===
By the mid-1920s Eastgate station had been demolished and the siding removed. The signal box remained in use.

During World War 2 RAF Lavenham was constructed with construction building materials and later personnel using Lavenham station.

=== British Railways and closure (1948-1965) ===
Following nationalisation in 1948 the line became part of the Eastern Region of British Railways.

Throughout the late 1940s and 1950s the train was used by excursion traffic from the Midlands for Clacton and Walton (likely route March, Ely, Bury St Edmunds, Lavenham, Long Melford, Sudbury, Colchester, Clacton).

Diesel railcar working was introduced from July 1959 in an effort to reduce costs. However with infrequent and lightly used services operating over the line the writing was on the wall.

The line closed to passengers on 10 April 1961 and a special train ran on that date.

The section from Lavenham to Long Melford was lifted in May 1962 with freight between Bury and Lavenham (Cockfield and Welnetham both remained open for freight initially with Welnetham closing on 13 July 1964). However, a society wedding took place on 2 June 1962 and two special passenger trains headed by Class 31 locomotives, bringing guests visited the remnants of the branch.

The very last freight train ran on 15 April 1965 and was formed of a Class 15 locomotive number D8221 and, on departure from Bury St Edmunds, a single Brake Van. At Lavenham the engine cleared the yard of 16 ton mineral wagons (suggesting the last traffic was domestic coal) and departed. However by the time the train reached Cockfield the guard realised that he had forgotten to pay the staff at Lavenham so the train promptly reversed direction and arrived in Lavenham running backwards.

The line closed to all traffic on 19 April 1965.

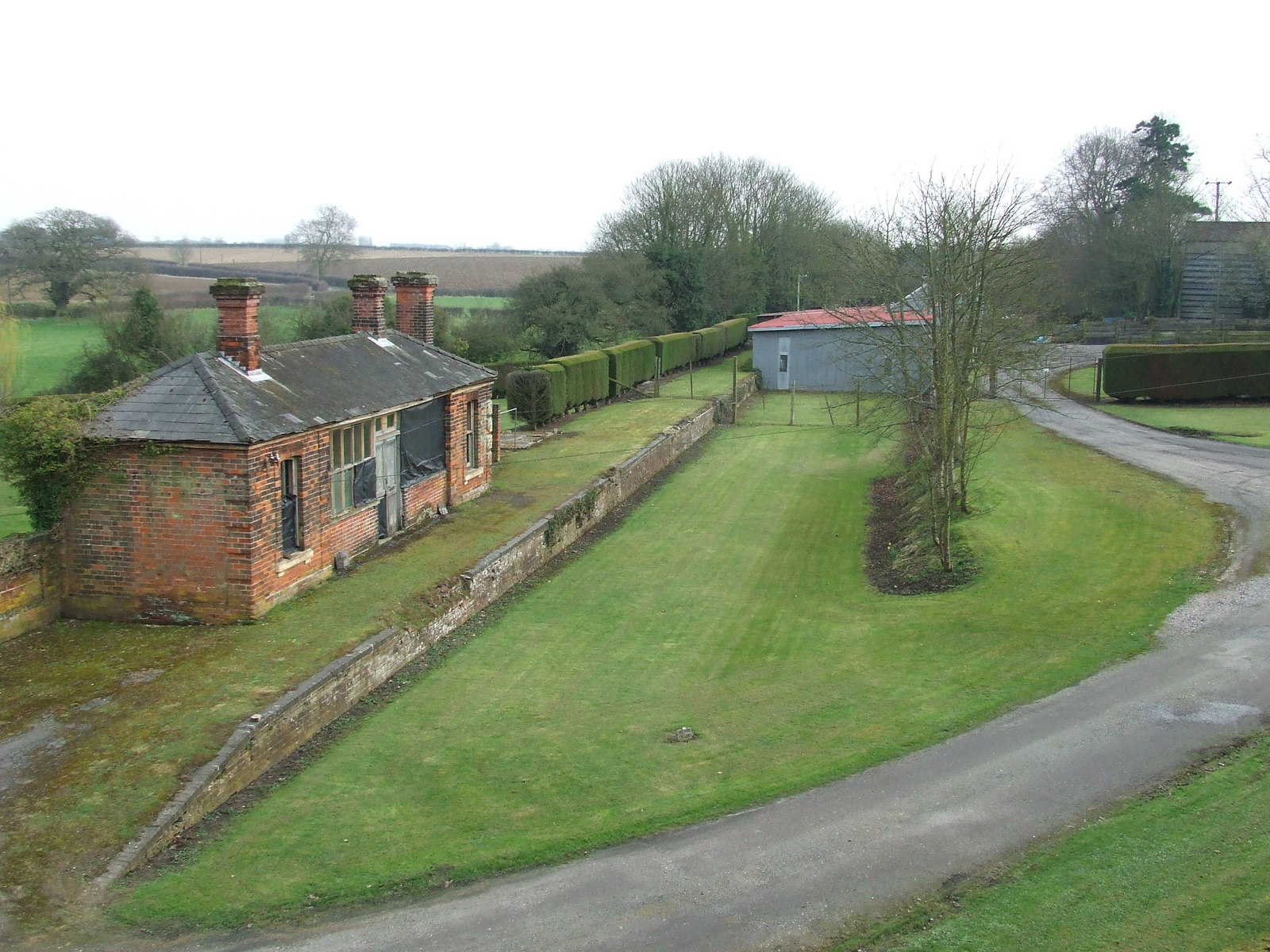
Cockfield station in 2020

== Operations ==
=== Timetable July 1922 ===
By June 1922 (the last year of the GER) the weekday train services saw southbound departures from Bury St Edmunds at 07.26 (to Colchester) 09.14, 11.12 and 1.40 (pm) (to Long Melford where they connected with a Cambridge to Colchester train), 3.40 (Colchester) 4.27 (Sudbury - ran Wednesday only) and 5.50 (Colchester).

All trains called at all stations on the line (noting Bury Eastgate had closed by this date).

In the Northbound direction departures (from Long Melford) were 7.36 (through train from Sudbury), 10.03, 12.05 (pm) (Start Long Melford connecting from Colchester to Cambridge trains, 2.41 (from Colchester), 4.36 (start Long Melford) and 7.42 (from Colchester).

Journey time was generally around 34 minutes between Long Melford and Lavenham.

=== Locomotives and rolling stock ===
Steam locomotives that worked the line included:

- GER Class Y14 0-6-0 (later became LNER Class J15)
- GER Class T26 2-4-0 (later became LNER Class E4)
- GNR Class C2 4-4-2T (later became LNER Class C12)

Coaching stock was generally ex GER and LNER stock cascaded from mainline workings.

Diesel locomotives that worked the line included:

- British Rail Class 15 Bo-Bo
- British Rail Class 31 A1A-A1A

The line saw a number of early DMU types operate services on the line including:

- British Rail Derby Lightweight
- British Rail Class 105
- British Rail Class 109

A short film showing some train operating the line in early British Rail steam days can be found here http://www.eafa.org.uk/catalogue/1021 Some footage of diesel workings can be found by following the link on the Polish Princess reference below.

== Miscellanea ==
At Rodbridge level crossing between Long Melford and Lavenham the level crossing keeper was a dispossessed Polish Princess (who was a trade union member) during the early 1960s.

There was a railway convalescent home for railway women and the wives of railwaymen located at the Wool Hall in Lavenham between 1921 and 1961.
