= Listed buildings in Long Melford =

Civil Parish in Suffolk, England

Long Melford is a village and civil parish in the Babergh District of Suffolk, England. It contains 204 listed buildings that are recorded in the National Heritage List for England. Of these four are grade I, 12 are grade II* and 188 are grade II.

This list is based on the information retrieved online from Historic England.

== Key ==
Grade	Criteria
I	Buildings that are of exceptional interest
II*	Particularly important buildings of more than special interest
II	Buildings that are of special interest

== Listing ==
Name	Grade	Location	Type	Completed (Note: The date given is the date used by Historic England as significant for the initial building or that of an important part in the structure's description.)	Date designated	Grid ref. (Note: The grid reference is based on the British national grid reference system, sometimes known as OSGB36, used by the Ordnance Survey.) Geo-coordinates	Notes	Entry number (Note: The "List Entry Number" is a unique number assigned to each listed building and scheduled monument by Historic England.)	Image	Wikidata
Bridge Street Farmhouse	II*	Bridge Street	farmhouse		10 January 1953	TL8715348463; 52°06′10″N 0°43′52″E		1036574	Bridge Street Farmhouse More images	Q17532844
Ford Hall	II	Bridge Street			10 January 1953	TL8791648975; 52°06′26″N 0°44′33″E		1036575	Upload Photo	Q26288257
K6 Telephone Kiosk	II	Bridge Street			23 May 1994	TL8778849121; 52°06′31″N 0°44′27″E		1276330	Upload Photo	Q26683230
Old Forge House	II	Bridge Street			9 February 1978	TL8788449162; 52°06′32″N 0°44′32″E		1181719	Upload Photo	Q26477018
Primrose Hill Cottage	II	Bridge Street			9 February 1978	TL8749748766; 52°06′20″N 0°44′11″E		1036577	Upload Photo	Q26288259
Rose Cottage	II	Bridge Street			9 February 1978	TL8781049084; 52°06′29″N 0°44′28″E		1181736	Upload Photo	Q26477035
Smithy	II	Bridge Street			9 February 1978	TL8787749180; 52°06′33″N 0°44′32″E		1036576	Upload Photo	Q26288258
The Old Rose and Crown	II	Bridge Street, CO10 9BQ	inn		9 February 1978	TL8782149131; 52°06′31″N 0°44′29″E		1351796	The Old Rose and Crown More images	Q26634866
24, Bull Lane	II	24, Bull Lane			9 February 1978	TL8724845808; 52°04′44″N 0°43′52″E		1284861	Upload Photo	Q26573600
Barn and Outbuilding to Bull Lane Farmhouse	II	Bull Lane			9 February 1978	TL8729645842; 52°04′45″N 0°43′55″E		1351797	Upload Photo	Q26634867
Bull Lane Farmhouse	II	Bull Lane			10 January 1953	TL8731045857; 52°04′46″N 0°43′55″E		1036578	Upload Photo	Q26288261
The Old Cottage	II	Bull Lane			23 March 1961	TL8744445851; 52°04′45″N 0°44′02″E		1181784	Upload Photo	Q26477081
5 and 6, Chapel Green	II	5 and 6, Chapel Green			9 February 1978	TL8627145008; 52°04′20″N 0°42′59″E		1036579	Upload Photo	Q26288262
Chapelside	II	7, Chapel Green			9 February 1978	TL8626944999; 52°04′19″N 0°42′59″E		1033699	Upload Photo	Q26285190
Chapel House	II	Chapel Green			9 February 1978	TL8625445044; 52°04′21″N 0°42′58″E		1351798	Upload Photo	Q26634868
Maltings and Granary to the North of Chapel House, Chapel Green	II	Chapel Green, Little St Mary's			9 February 1978	TL8626845060; 52°04′21″N 0°42′59″E		1033675	Upload Photo	Q26285163
Number 9 Chapel Green	II	Chapel Green			9 February 1978	TL8626944991; 52°04′19″N 0°42′59″E		1351817	Upload Photo	Q26634887
1-5, Church Walk (see Details for Further Address Information)	II	1-5, Church Walk			10 January 1953	TL8650146666; 52°05′13″N 0°43′15″E		1036553	Upload Photo	Q26288235
Church Row	II	1-6, Church Walk			9 February 1978	TL8650646595; 52°05′11″N 0°43′15″E		1036550	Upload Photo	Q26288232
Mersea House	II	7, Church Walk			9 February 1978	TL8650646614; 52°05′11″N 0°43′15″E		1284520	Upload Photo	Q26573283
9, Church Walk	II	9, Church Walk			9 February 1978	TL8650446636; 52°05′12″N 0°43′15″E		1182519	Upload Photo	Q26477765
11, the Green West (see Details for Further Address Information)	II	11, Church Walk			23 March 1961	TL8649846650; 52°05′12″N 0°43′14″E		1036552	Upload Photo	Q26288234
Church of the Holy Trinity	I	Church Walk	church building		9 February 1978	TL8650946760; 52°05′16″N 0°43′15″E		1182550	Church of the Holy Trinity More images	Q5886552
Ely House	II	Church Walk			10 January 1953	TL8650546626; 52°05′12″N 0°43′15″E		1036551	Upload Photo	Q26288233
Garden Wall to South and East of Trininty Hospital Garden Wall to South and East of Trinity Hospital	II	Church Walk			9 February 1978	TL8654246654; 52°05′12″N 0°43′17″E		1351825	Upload Photo	Q26634893
Long Melford War Memorial	II	Church Walk, CO10 9DJ	war memorial		7 June 2016	TL8650446710; 52°05′14″N 0°43′15″E		1434740	Long Melford War Memorial More images	Q26678039
Montgomery House	II	Church Walk			9 February 1978	TL8646946705; 52°05′14″N 0°43′13″E		1284500	Upload Photo	Q26573263
The Black Lion Inn	II	Church Walk	inn		9 February 1978	TL8650546573; 52°05′10″N 0°43′15″E		1036549	The Black Lion Inn More images	Q26288231
Trinity Hospital	I	Church Walk	almshouse		10 January 1953	TL8652946698; 52°05′14″N 0°43′16″E		1036554	Trinity Hospital More images	Q17541683
Serpentine Wall	II	Cock And Bell Lane			9 February 1978	TL8627245676; 52°04′41″N 0°43′01″E		1033700	Upload Photo	Q26285191
The Gate House, Corpus Christi and Oaken	II*	Corpus Christi And Oaken, Little St Marys, Sudbury, CO10 9HY			10 January 1953	TL8627245180; 52°04′25″N 0°43′00″E		1351864	Upload Photo	Q17534668
Cranmore Green Farmhouse	II	Cranmore Green			9 February 1978	TL8511147609; 52°05′45″N 0°42′03″E		1033701	Upload Photo	Q26285192
Hawthorne, Girton and Hildon	II	Girton And Hildon, Hall Street			9 February 1978	TL8626545549; 52°04′37″N 0°43′00″E		1351835	Upload Photo	Q26634903
Numbers 1 and 2 Dairy Cottages and Dairy	II	1 and 2 Dairy Cottages, Hall Street			9 February 1978	TL8628745489; 52°04′35″N 0°43′01″E		1351846	Upload Photo	Q26634913
Old Court House	II	1-4, Hall Street			10 June 1977	TL8651745944; 52°04′50″N 0°43′14″E		1284354	Upload Photo	Q26573133
Tudor Cottages	II	1, 2 and 3, Hall Street			23 March 1961	TL8633545633; 52°04′40″N 0°43′04″E		1284438	Upload Photo	Q26573208
Anglia Cottage, 2 and 3 Anglia Cottages and Saffron Cottage	II	3, Hall Street			9 February 1978	TL8635645674; 52°04′41″N 0°43′05″E		1033685	Upload Photo	Q26285174
Jamon Tudor Cottages	II	4 and 5, Hall Street			23 March 1961	TL8632345617; 52°04′39″N 0°43′03″E		1033683	Upload Photo	Q26285172
7-9, Hall Street	II	7-9, Hall Street			9 February 1978	TL8643045794; 52°04′45″N 0°43′09″E		1351814	Upload Photo	Q26634884
68, Hall Street	II	68, Hall Street, CO10 9JT			9 February 1978	TL8624245357; 52°04′31″N 0°42′58″E		1033647	Upload Photo	Q26285131
Almacks	II	Hall Street			10 January 1953	TL8624745454; 52°04′34″N 0°42′59″E		1182872	Upload Photo	Q26478096
Ardley House and Linden House	II	Hall Street, CO10 9JA			10 January 1953	TL8628145452; 52°04′34″N 0°43′01″E		1351845	Upload Photo	Q26634912
Armstrong	II	Hall Street			9 February 1978	TL8634345664; 52°04′41″N 0°43′04″E		1284410	Upload Photo	Q26573183
Aurora House and Shop Perryville	II	Hall Street			10 January 1953	TL8629745645; 52°04′40″N 0°43′02″E		1033659	Upload Photo	Q26285145
Barclays Bank and Long Melford Post Office	II	Hall Street			9 February 1978	TL8631245672; 52°04′41″N 0°43′03″E		1033660	Upload Photo	Q26285146
Bells House and Village Stores	II	Hall Street			10 January 1953	TL8638445800; 52°04′45″N 0°43′07″E		1183007	Upload Photo	Q26478229
Belmont	II	Hall Street			9 February 1978	TL8641045742; 52°04′43″N 0°43′08″E		1284399	Upload Photo	Q26573173
Blythe House	II	Hall Street, CO10 9JD			10 January 1953	TL8633645645; 52°04′40″N 0°43′04″E		1033684	Upload Photo	Q26285173
Bridge View	II	Hall Street			10 January 1953	TL8649845918; 52°04′49″N 0°43′13″E		1033692	Upload Photo	Q26285182
Brook House	II*	Hall Street	house		10 January 1953	TL8642945909; 52°04′49″N 0°43′09″E		1183049	Brook House More images	Q17533750
Building Occupied by C J N Row and Sons; Outbuilding and Wall of Holgate to the South	II	Hall Street			9 February 1978	TL8627545372; 52°04′31″N 0°43′00″E		1351826	Upload Photo	Q26634894
Bull Hotel	II*	Hall Street	hotel		9 February 1978	TL8648745878; 52°04′47″N 0°43′12″E		1182781	Bull Hotel More images	Q17533738
Bunyan Cottage and North Part of Melford Galleries	II	Hall Street			9 February 1978	TL8641245771; 52°04′44″N 0°43′08″E		1033687	Upload Photo	Q26285177
Chestnut Cottage	II	Hall Street			9 February 1978	TL8630745550; 52°04′37″N 0°43′02″E		1351847	Upload Photo	Q26634914
Chestnut House	II	Hall Street			23 March 1961	TL8632045568; 52°04′38″N 0°43′03″E		1033680	Upload Photo	Q26285169
Chimneys	II	Hall Street, Sudbury, CO10 9JR	house		10 January 1953	TL8627445589; 52°04′38″N 0°43′00″E		1033657	Chimneys More images	Q26285142
Church House Mill Ford House West Lynn	II	Hall Street			9 February 1978	TL8648545906; 52°04′48″N 0°43′12″E		1033691	Upload Photo	Q26285181
Cleeve Cottage	II	Hall Street			9 February 1978	TL8644645840; 52°04′46″N 0°43′10″E		1033689	Upload Photo	Q26285179
Co-operative Store and Foundry House	II	Hall Street			9 February 1978	TL8626945602; 52°04′39″N 0°43′00″E		1351836	Upload Photo	Q26634904
Cobblers	II	Hall Street			9 February 1978	TL8626445543; 52°04′37″N 0°43′00″E		1033656	Upload Photo	Q26285141
Cock and Bell Hotel	II	Hall Street	hotel		10 January 1953	TL8627545633; 52°04′40″N 0°43′01″E		1033658	Cock and Bell Hotel More images	Q26285144
Cottage to the North West of Hall Mill House	II	Hall Street			9 February 1978	TL8651446030; 52°04′52″N 0°43′14″E		1033695	Upload Photo	Q26285186
Crown Inn	II	Hall Street	inn		9 February 1978	TL8634545743; 52°04′43″N 0°43′05″E		1182995	Crown Inn More images	Q26478216
Denmark House	II	Hall Street			9 February 1978	TL8634945670; 52°04′41″N 0°43′05″E		1351812	Upload Photo	Q26634882
Duck Cottage	II	Hall Street			9 February 1978	TL8639845821; 52°04′46″N 0°43′07″E		1183012	Upload Photo	Q26478233
Eldon Cottage	II	Hall Street			9 February 1978	TL8625945535; 52°04′37″N 0°43′00″E		1033655	Upload Photo	Q26285140
Fernlea Westdene	II	Hall Street			9 February 1978	TL8631445588; 52°04′38″N 0°43′03″E		1033681	Upload Photo	Q26285170
Fine Fare Stores	II	Hall Street			16 April 1971	TL8637045775; 52°04′44″N 0°43′06″E		1351839	Upload Photo	Q26634907
Ford End	II	Hall Street			9 February 1978	TL8650645921; 52°04′49″N 0°43′13″E		1033693	Upload Photo	Q26285183
Former Congregational Chapel	II	Hall Street	public library		23 March 1961	TL8622345399; 52°04′32″N 0°42′57″E		1284366	Former Congregational Chapel More images	Q26573144
George and Dragon Inn	II	Hall Street	inn		9 February 1978	TL8627945420; 52°04′33″N 0°43′00″E		1182580	George and Dragon Inn More images	Q26477825
Hall Mill House	II	Hall Street			10 January 1953	TL8652346008; 52°04′52″N 0°43′14″E		1033694	Upload Photo	Q26285184
Hanwell House	II	Hall Street	house		23 March 1961	TL8629345663; 52°04′41″N 0°43′02″E		1351837	Hanwell House More images	Q26634905
Holgate	II	Hall Street			9 February 1978	TL8627745338; 52°04′30″N 0°43′00″E		1284475	Upload Photo	Q26573238
House Owned by Alston Limited Adjoining Cocoanut House on the North	II	Hall Street			9 February 1978	TL8642445879; 52°04′48″N 0°43′09″E		1351841	Upload Photo	Q26634909
House and Shopowned by Mr S J Collett to the South of Brook Street	II	Hall Street			9 February 1978	TL8642645888; 52°04′48″N 0°43′09″E		1033666	Upload Photo	Q26285152
K6 Telephone Kiosk	II	Hall Street			15 September 1988	TL8635245696; 52°04′42″N 0°43′05″E		1033462	Upload Photo	Q26284944
Lime Tree House the Lindens	II	Hall Street			9 February 1978	TL8641945779; 52°04′44″N 0°43′08″E		1182742	Upload Photo	Q26477975
List House	II	Hall Street			10 January 1953	TL8632545700; 52°04′42″N 0°43′03″E		1033661	Upload Photo	Q26285147
Lotus Cottage Westbury Milestone	II	Hall Street			9 February 1978	TL8630345544; 52°04′37″N 0°43′02″E		1033679	Upload Photo	Q26285168
Malthouse	II	Hall Street			9 February 1978	TL8628745327; 52°04′30″N 0°43′01″E		1036555	Upload Photo	Q26288236
Melford House	II	Hall Street			9 February 1978	TL8639345812; 52°04′45″N 0°43′07″E		1351840	Upload Photo	Q26634908
Oakleigh and Shop	II	Hall Street			9 February 1978	TL8632245608; 52°04′39″N 0°43′03″E		1033682	Upload Photo	Q26285171
Posting House	II	Hall Street			10 January 1953	TL8629645526; 52°04′36″N 0°43′02″E		1033678	Upload Photo	Q26285167
Primrose Cottage	II	Hall Street			10 January 1953	TL8649145912; 52°04′49″N 0°43′13″E		1284389	Upload Photo	Q26573164
Radio Cottages	II	Hall Street			9 February 1978	TL8626145523; 52°04′36″N 0°43′00″E		1351834	Upload Photo	Q26634902
Radio House	II	Hall Street			9 February 1978	TL8625745511; 52°04′36″N 0°42′59″E		1284318	Upload Photo	Q26573097
Red House and Cocoanut House	II	Hall Street			9 February 1978	TL8641845865; 52°04′47″N 0°43′09″E		1183020	Upload Photo	Q26478240
Ruse and Son and Ruse House	II	Hall Street, Sudbury, CO10 9JF			9 February 1978	TL8638545719; 52°04′42″N 0°43′07″E		1284395	Upload Photo	Q26573170
Serpentine Wall Enclosing Gardens at the Rear of Former Congregational Chapel	II	Hall Street			9 February 1978	TL8619745393; 52°04′32″N 0°42′56″E		1033696	Upload Photo	Q26285188
Shangri La	II	Hall Street			10 January 1953	TL8625245475; 52°04′35″N 0°42′59″E		1351816	Upload Photo	Q26634886
Shop Premises and Bassetts House	II	Hall Street			9 February 1978	TL8640645847; 52°04′47″N 0°43′08″E		1033665	Upload Photo	Q26285151
South Part of Melford Galleries and Garage Premises	II	Hall Street			9 February 1978	TL8640445758; 52°04′44″N 0°43′08″E		1351813	Upload Photo	Q26634883
Southdown House and Premises Occupied by E W Clarke (butcher)	II	Hall Street			9 February 1978	TL8631845682; 52°04′41″N 0°43′03″E		1351838	Upload Photo	Q26634906
Stone Cottage	II	Hall Street			9 February 1978	TL8633045641; 52°04′40″N 0°43′04″E		1351811	Upload Photo	Q26634881
The Beverley Adjoining Cottage and Shop	II	Hall Street			9 February 1978	TL8633845715; 52°04′42″N 0°43′04″E		1033662	Upload Photo	Q26285148
The Gables	II	Hall Street			10 January 1953	TL8624145434; 52°04′33″N 0°42′58″E		1033697	Upload Photo	Q26285189
The Laurels	II	Hall Street			9 February 1978	TL8628045389; 52°04′32″N 0°43′00″E		1036556	Upload Photo	Q26288237
The Manse	II	Hall Street			9 February 1978	TL8624145412; 52°04′33″N 0°42′58″E		1351815	Upload Photo	Q26634885
The Nookery	II	Hall Street			9 February 1978	TL8643645818; 52°04′46″N 0°43′09″E		1033688	Upload Photo	Q26285178
The Pharmacy	II	Hall Street			9 February 1978	TL8644445830; 52°04′46″N 0°43′10″E		1284375	Upload Photo	Q26573151
The Swan Inn	II	Hall Street	inn		9 February 1978	TL8639345831; 52°04′46″N 0°43′07″E		1033664	The Swan Inn More images	Q26285150
Thorpe House	II	Hall Street			9 February 1978	TL8631445579; 52°04′38″N 0°43′03″E		1351848	Upload Photo	Q26634915
Ty-gwyn	II	Hall Street			9 February 1978	TL8631645596; 52°04′39″N 0°43′03″E		1351849	Upload Photo	Q26634916
Walcot House	II	Hall Street			10 January 1953	TL8637245782; 52°04′44″N 0°43′06″E		1033663	Upload Photo	Q26285149
Wall to the East of Former Congregational Chapel	II	Hall Street			9 February 1978	TL8624845399; 52°04′32″N 0°42′59″E		1182862	Upload Photo	Q26478086
Wall to the West of Brook House	II	Hall Street			9 February 1978	TL8641945909; 52°04′49″N 0°43′09″E		1351842	Upload Photo	Q26634910
Walnuttree House	II	Hall Street			9 February 1978	TL8645645850; 52°04′47″N 0°43′11″E		1033690	Upload Photo	Q26285180
37, High Street	II	37, High Street			9 February 1978	TL8699647588; 52°05′42″N 0°43′42″E		1033674	Upload Photo	Q26285162
40, High Street	II	40, High Street, CO10 9BD			9 February 1978	TL8697247561; 52°05′41″N 0°43′41″E		1033673	Upload Photo	Q26285160
The Dower House	II	41, High Street, C10 9BD			9 February 1978	TL8696247532; 52°05′40″N 0°43′40″E		1183109	Upload Photo	Q26478319
42, High Street	II	42, High Street			9 February 1978	TL8694247451; 52°05′38″N 0°43′39″E		1033672	Upload Photo	Q26285159
57-60, High Street	II	57-60, High Street			9 February 1978	TL8678347067; 52°05′26″N 0°43′30″E		1033671	Upload Photo	Q26285158
Chase Cottage	II	High Street			9 February 1978	TL8674346726; 52°05′15″N 0°43′27″E		1033667	Upload Photo	Q26285154
Cordell Cottages	II	High Street			9 February 1978	TL8672146706; 52°05′14″N 0°43′26″E		1284235	Upload Photo	Q26573027
Hare Inn	II	High Street	inn		9 February 1978	TL8675346837; 52°05′18″N 0°43′28″E		1033668	Hare Inn More images	Q26285155
High Street Farmhouse	II	High Street			9 February 1978	TL8696947437; 52°05′37″N 0°43′41″E		1033670	Upload Photo	Q26285157
Hill House	II	High Street			9 February 1978	TL8680547033; 52°05′24″N 0°43′31″E		1033669	Upload Photo	Q26285156
Kentwell Lodge	II	High Street			9 February 1978	TL8670446781; 52°05′16″N 0°43′25″E		1183097	Upload Photo	Q26478307
Pink Cottage	II	High Street			9 February 1978	TL8672746768; 52°05′16″N 0°43′27″E		1183072	Upload Photo	Q26478286
Thatched Cottage	II	High Street			9 February 1978	TL8693547363; 52°05′35″N 0°43′39″E		1183084	Upload Photo	Q26478297
Wain House	II	High Street			9 February 1978	TL8672846754; 52°05′15″N 0°43′27″E		1351843	Upload Photo	Q26634911
Bourchier Galleries, House and Shop	II*	House And Shop, Hall Street	restaurant		23 March 1961	TL8624745487; 52°04′35″N 0°42′59″E		1033698	Bourchier Galleries, House and Shop More images	Q17532815
Kentwell Hall Including Detached Building to the West, Brick Revetment of Moat and 2 Bridges Over Moat	I	Brick Revetment Of Moat And 2 Bridges Over Moat, Kentwell	manor house		10 January 1953	TL8633047945; 52°05′54″N 0°43′08″E		1183113	Kentwell Hall Including Detached Building to the West, Brick Revetment of Moat and 2 Bridges Over Moat More images	Q6392471
Dovecote to the South West of Kentwell Hall	II*	Kentwell	dovecote		9 February 1978	TL8630447882; 52°05′52″N 0°43′07″E		1351844	Dovecote to the South West of Kentwell Hall More images	Q66477544
Cuckoo Tye Farmhouse	II	King's Lane			24 October 1979	TL8786744505; 52°04′01″N 0°44′22″E		1351942	Upload Photo	Q26635004
1, 2, 3, 5 and 6, Liston Lane	II	1, 2, 3, 5 and 6, Liston Lane, CO10 9LD			9 February 1978	TL8621845244; 52°04′27″N 0°42′57″E		1183142	Upload Photo	Q26478348
1-5, Little St Mary's	II	1-5, Little St Mary's			9 February 1978	TL8624445273; 52°04′28″N 0°42′58″E		1197989	Upload Photo	Q26492434
Park Terrace	II	1-16, Little St Mary's			9 February 1978	TL8623645097; 52°04′22″N 0°42′58″E		1351868	Upload Photo	Q26634931
8-10, Little St Mary's	II	8-10, Little St Mary's, CO10 9LA			9 February 1978	TL8624345302; 52°04′29″N 0°42′58″E		1033646	Upload Photo	Q26285130
27 Little St Mary's	II	27, Little St Mary's, Sudbury, CO10 9HY			9 February 1978	TL8627945193; 52°04′26″N 0°43′00″E		1033637	Upload Photo	Q26285122
Chapel at Melford Place	II*	Little St Mary's	chapel		10 January 1953	TL8619644966; 52°04′18″N 0°42′55″E		1183356	Chapel at Melford Place More images	Q17533762
Crosskeys	II	Little St Mary's			9 February 1978	TL8626845148; 52°04′24″N 0°42′59″E		1033636	Upload Photo	Q26285121
Dixey Cottage	II	Little St Mary's			9 February 1978	TL8627345274; 52°04′28″N 0°43′00″E		1033640	Upload Photo	Q26285125
Gable End	II	Little St Mary's	house		9 February 1978	TL8623945380; 52°04′32″N 0°42′58″E		1033648	Gable End More images	Q26285132
Garage House	II	Little St Mary's			9 February 1978	TL8624345184; 52°04′25″N 0°42′58″E		1183372	Upload Photo	Q26478564
Green Shutters	II	Little St Mary's			9 February 1978	TL8626445120; 52°04′23″N 0°42′59″E		1351863	Upload Photo	Q26634927
Iona and Elverton	II	Little St Mary's			9 February 1978	TL8624045348; 52°04′31″N 0°42′58″E		1284052	Upload Photo	Q26572858
Kings Farm and Oriole Cottage	II	Little St Mary's, Sudbury, CO10 9HY			23 March 1961	TL8627545242; 52°04′27″N 0°43′00″E		1351866	Upload Photo	Q26634929
Lyston House	II	Little St Mary's			9 February 1978	TL8624345264; 52°04′28″N 0°42′58″E		1033645	Upload Photo	Q26285129
Martins	II	Little St Mary's			9 February 1978	TL8624245319; 52°04′30″N 0°42′58″E		1198004	Upload Photo	Q26492450
Old Forge Cottage	II	Little St Mary's			23 March 1961	TL8626445127; 52°04′23″N 0°42′59″E		1033635	Upload Photo	Q26285119
Shop and House Occupied by Mr E S Wright Adjoining Nos 1 to 5 (consecutive) on the North	II	Little St Mary's			9 February 1978	TL8624445295; 52°04′29″N 0°42′58″E		1351831	Upload Photo	Q26634899
St Mary's	II	Little St Mary's			23 March 1961	TL8624045338; 52°04′30″N 0°42′58″E		1351832	Upload Photo	Q26634900
The Cottage and Abbotts Close	II	Little St Mary's			9 February 1978	TL8625945106; 52°04′23″N 0°42′59″E		1033634	Upload Photo	Q26285118
The Elms	II*	Little St Mary's	house		10 January 1953	TL8627545305; 52°04′29″N 0°43′00″E		1033641	The Elms More images	Q17532805
The Garage House	II	Little St Mary's			9 February 1978	TL8627445265; 52°04′28″N 0°43′00″E		1351867	Upload Photo	Q26634930
Twincott and Garage (occupied by Theobalds Coaches)	II	Little St Mary's			9 February 1978	TL8624345162; 52°04′25″N 0°42′58″E		1033642	Upload Photo	Q26285126
White Cottage	II	Little St Mary's			9 February 1978	TL8624245196; 52°04′26″N 0°42′58″E		1351869	Upload Photo	Q26634932
White Hart Inn	II	Little St Mary's	inn		9 February 1978	TL8625745094; 52°04′22″N 0°42′59″E		1033676	White Hart Inn More images	Q26285165
Angelas Boutique	II	Little St Marys, CO10 9HY			9 February 1978	TL8628345253; 52°04′27″N 0°43′00″E		1033639	Upload Photo	Q26285124
H and A.w Palmer Funeral Service	II	Little St Marys, CO10 9LQ			9 February 1978	TL8624445218; 52°04′26″N 0°42′58″E		1284109	Upload Photo	Q26572913
Long Melford Saddlery	II	Little St Marys, CO10 9LQ			9 February 1978	TL8624145212; 52°04′26″N 0°42′58″E		1033643	Upload Photo	Q26285127
Russets and Whos Cottage	II	Little St Marys, Sudbury, CO10 9JB			9 February 1978	TL8627345284; 52°04′28″N 0°43′00″E		1284117	Upload Photo	Q26572921
Village Clocks	II	Little St Marys, CO10 9LQ			9 February 1978	TL8624445223; 52°04′27″N 0°42′58″E		1033644	Upload Photo	Q26285128
Kings Cottage, Little St Marys Cottage, Archway Cottage and Oriole Cottage	II	Little St Marys Cottage, Archway Cottage And Oriole Cottage, Little St Mary's, Sudbury, CO10 9HY			23 March 1961	TL8627345225; 52°04′27″N 0°43′00″E		1033638	Upload Photo	Q26285123
Sloane Cottage and Nos. 1 to 3 Lower Falkland Cottages	II	1 To 3, Lower Falkland Cottages, The Green			9 February 1978	TL8650946468; 52°05′06″N 0°43′15″E		1284527	Upload Photo	Q26573289
Lime Cottage, Magpie Cottage and Ruskin	II	Magpie Cottage And Ruskin, Hall Street			23 March 1961	TL8628445474; 52°04′35″N 0°43′01″E		1033677	Upload Photo	Q26285166
Barns at Rodbridge House	II	Mills Lane			9 March 2011	TL8625343867; 52°03′43″N 0°42′56″E		1396596	Upload Photo	Q26675373
Long Wall	II	Newmans Green			28 February 1997	TL8741343607; 52°03′33″N 0°43′56″E		1257881	Upload Photo	Q26549191
Rodbridge House	II	Rodbridge			9 February 1978	TL8620243911; 52°03′44″N 0°42′53″E		1198067	Upload Photo	Q26492515
1 and 2, Ruses Cottages	II	1 and 2, Ruses Cottages, Hall Street, CO10 9JF			9 February 1978	TL8639045732; 52°04′43″N 0°43′07″E		1033686	Upload Photo	Q26285175
Former One Window Range House, Now Part of 27, Little St Mary's	II	27 Little St Mary's, Sudbury, CO10 9HY			9 February 1978	TL8627045200; 52°04′26″N 0°43′00″E		1351865	Upload Photo	Q26634928
The Old Bakery	II	2, The Green East			9 February 1978	TL8664346578; 52°05′10″N 0°43′22″E		1033705	Upload Photo	Q26285193
Cherry Tree Cottage	II	The Green East			9 February 1978	TL8665446587; 52°05′10″N 0°43′22″E		1351820	Upload Photo	Q26634888
Flemings	II	The Green East			9 February 1978	TL8670646583; 52°05′10″N 0°43′25″E		1182370	Upload Photo	Q26477624
Gardens Walls to Melford Hall	II*	The Green East	wall		9 February 1978	TL8657646198; 52°04′58″N 0°43′18″E		1351818	Gardens Walls to Melford Hall More images	Q17534628
Gateway and Lodges to Melford Hall	II*	The Green East	gate		16 April 1971	TL8658646294; 52°05′01″N 0°43′18″E		1033703	Gateway and Lodges to Melford Hall More images	Q17532827
Lower Holland	II	The Green East			9 February 1978	TL8667246619; 52°05′11″N 0°43′23″E		1033706	Upload Photo	Q26285194
Melford Hall	I	The Green East	war memorial		10 January 1953	TL8665146181; 52°04′57″N 0°43′21″E		1033702	Melford Hall More images	Q6812225
Summer House at Melford Hall	II*	The Green East	summer house		10 January 1953	TL8659046257; 52°05′00″N 0°43′18″E		1351819	Summer House at Melford Hall More images	Q96257631
Teal Cottage	II	The Green East			9 February 1978	TL8670646565; 52°05′09″N 0°43′25″E		1351821	Upload Photo	Q26634889
Water Conduit	II*	The Green East	well house		10 January 1953	TL8659746427; 52°05′05″N 0°43′19″E		1033704	Water Conduit More images	Q17532835
Pound Hall Cottages	II	1, 2 and 3, The Green West			23 March 1961	TL8650846328; 52°05′02″N 0°43′14″E		1182387	Upload Photo	Q26477640
Upper Falkland House	II	6 and 7, The Green West			10 January 1953	TL8650746519; 52°05′08″N 0°43′15″E		1036548	Upload Photo	Q26288229
Boundary Wall Fronting the Green at the Primary School	II	The Green West			13 December 1973	TL8653146152; 52°04′56″N 0°43′15″E		1284547	Upload Photo	Q26573308
Conduit House	II	The Green West			23 March 1961	TL8649646415; 52°05′05″N 0°43′14″E		1182422	Upload Photo	Q26477669
Dorset Cottage	II	The Green West			9 February 1978	TL8650446406; 52°05′04″N 0°43′14″E		1036546	Upload Photo	Q26288227
Dunn House	II	The Green West			10 January 1953	TL8650746441; 52°05′06″N 0°43′14″E		1351824	Upload Photo	Q26634892
East View	II	The Green West			9 February 1978	TL8650546398; 52°05′04″N 0°43′14″E		1351823	Upload Photo	Q26634891
Falkland House and Jason House	II	The Green West			10 January 1953	TL8650646496; 52°05′07″N 0°43′14″E		1036547	Upload Photo	Q26288228
Ferns and Lion House	II	The Green West			10 January 1953	TL8650546544; 52°05′09″N 0°43′14″E		1284510	Upload Photo	Q26573273
Grange House	II	The Green West			9 February 1978	TL8650646372; 52°05′03″N 0°43′14″E		1036545	Upload Photo	Q26288226
Park View	II	The Green West			9 February 1978	TL8650446352; 52°05′03″N 0°43′14″E		1351822	Upload Photo	Q26634890
Pound Hall	II	The Green West			9 February 1978	TL8650546263; 52°05′00″N 0°43′14″E		1036544	Upload Photo	Q26288225
Primary School	II	The Green West	school building		13 December 1973	TL8649646146; 52°04′56″N 0°43′13″E		1033707	Primary School More images	Q26285195
1-4, Theobalds Cottages	II	1-4, Theobalds Cottages, Little St Marys, CO10 9LQ			9 February 1978	TL8624345249; 52°04′27″N 0°42′58″E		1351830	Upload Photo	Q26685445
5-7, Theobalds Cottages	II	5-7, Theobalds Cottages, Little St Marys, CO10 9LQ			9 February 1978	TL8624445233; 52°04′27″N 0°42′58″E		1183398	Upload Photo	Q26478587
1, Westgate Street	II	1, Westgate Street			9 February 1978	TL8640246541; 52°05′09″N 0°43′09″E		1351833	Upload Photo	Q26634901
1-5, Westgate Street	II	1-5, Westgate Street			16 April 1971	TL8630446580; 52°05′10″N 0°43′04″E		1283996	Upload Photo	Q26572805
Scutchers Cottages	II	1-6, Westgate Street			9 February 1978	TL8639546613; 52°05′11″N 0°43′09″E		1033651	Upload Photo	Q26285136
Westgate Terrace	II	1-7, Westgate Street			9 February 1978	TL8646746577; 52°05′10″N 0°43′13″E		1033649	Upload Photo	Q26285134
Numbers 2 and 3	II	2 and 3, Westgate Street			9 February 1978	TL8638446539; 52°05′09″N 0°43′08″E		1198114	Upload Photo	Q26492565
5-7, Westgate Street	II	5-7, Westgate Street			9 February 1978	TL8635546541; 52°05′09″N 0°43′07″E		1033654	Upload Photo	Q26285139
8, Westgate Street	II	8, Westgate Street			9 February 1978	TL8634846542; 52°05′09″N 0°43′06″E		1351852	Upload Photo	Q26634918
9, Westgate Street	II	9, Westgate Street			9 February 1978	TL8634246543; 52°05′09″N 0°43′06″E		1033612	Upload Photo	Q26285096
10, Westgate Street	II	10, Westgate Street			9 February 1978	TL8633446540; 52°05′09″N 0°43′06″E		1033613	Upload Photo	Q26285097
11-20, Westgate Street	II	11-20, Westgate Street			9 February 1978	TL8629846542; 52°05′09″N 0°43′04″E		1351853	Upload Photo	Q26634919
Coniston and Bixby Cottage	II	Westgate Street			9 February 1978	TL8640346582; 52°05′10″N 0°43′09″E		1284031	Upload Photo	Q26572839
Scutchers Arms	II	Westgate Street			9 February 1978	TL8641846580; 52°05′10″N 0°43′10″E		1033650	Upload Photo	Q26285135
Serpentine Wall on the South Side of Westgate Street	II	Westgate Street			23 March 1961	TL8645246547; 52°05′09″N 0°43′12″E		1198106	Upload Photo	Q26492556
Stables and Outbuildings to Westgate House	II	Westgate Street			9 February 1978	TL8617546593; 52°05′11″N 0°42′57″E		1033653	Upload Photo	Q26285138
Westgate Cottage	II	Westgate Street			9 February 1978	TL8604146586; 52°05′11″N 0°42′50″E		1033614	Upload Photo	Q26285099
Westgate House	II	Westgate Street			10 January 1953	TL8619746592; 52°05′11″N 0°42′58″E		1033652	Upload Photo	Q26285137

== See also ==
- Grade I listed buildings in Suffolk
- Grade II* listed buildings in Suffolk

== Sources ==
- Bettely, James; Pevsner, Nikolaus (2015) [1961], Suffolk: West, The Buildings of England, New Haven and London: Yale University Press, ISBN 978-0-300-19655-9
