= Nathaniel Westlake =

British artist specialising in stained glass

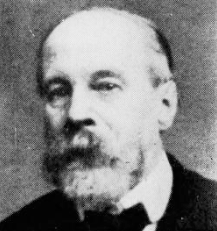
- Born: Nathaniel Hubert John Westlake; 1833; Romsey, England
- Died: 8 May 1921 (aged 88); Brighton, England
- Other name: N. H. J. Westlake
- Occupation: Artist

Nathaniel Hubert John Westlake FSA (1833–1921) was a 19th-century British artist specialising in stained glass.

== Career ==
Nathaniel Westlake was born in Romsey in 1833. He began to design for the firm of Lavers & Barraud, Ecclesiastical Designers, in 1858, and became a partner ten years later, making the firm Lavers, Barraud and Westlake, of which he became sole proprietor in 1880. The firm was then known as Lavers & Westlake.

A leading designer of the Gothic Revival movement, his works include The Vision of Beatrice (1864), commissioned for an exhibition of stained glass held at the South Kensington Museum (renamed the Victoria and Albert Museum in 1899).

In 1896, Lavers & Westlake were commissioned to reglaze two central lights in the great hall windows at Mary Datchelor Girls' School, Camberwell. The subjects were Lady Jane Grey discourses with Roger Ascham and By Industry and Perseverance, symbolising the importance of female endeavour in higher education. Other windows included On the way to Chapel, Physical Exercise, The Kindergarten and The Classroom. The windows were removed from the school in 2010 after it was converted into a series of apartments.

Westlake published under the name of "Nat Hubert John Westlake". He contributed an article on mosaics to the Catholic Encyclopedia.

He died in Brighton on 8 May 1921.

== Works ==
=== Stained glass ===
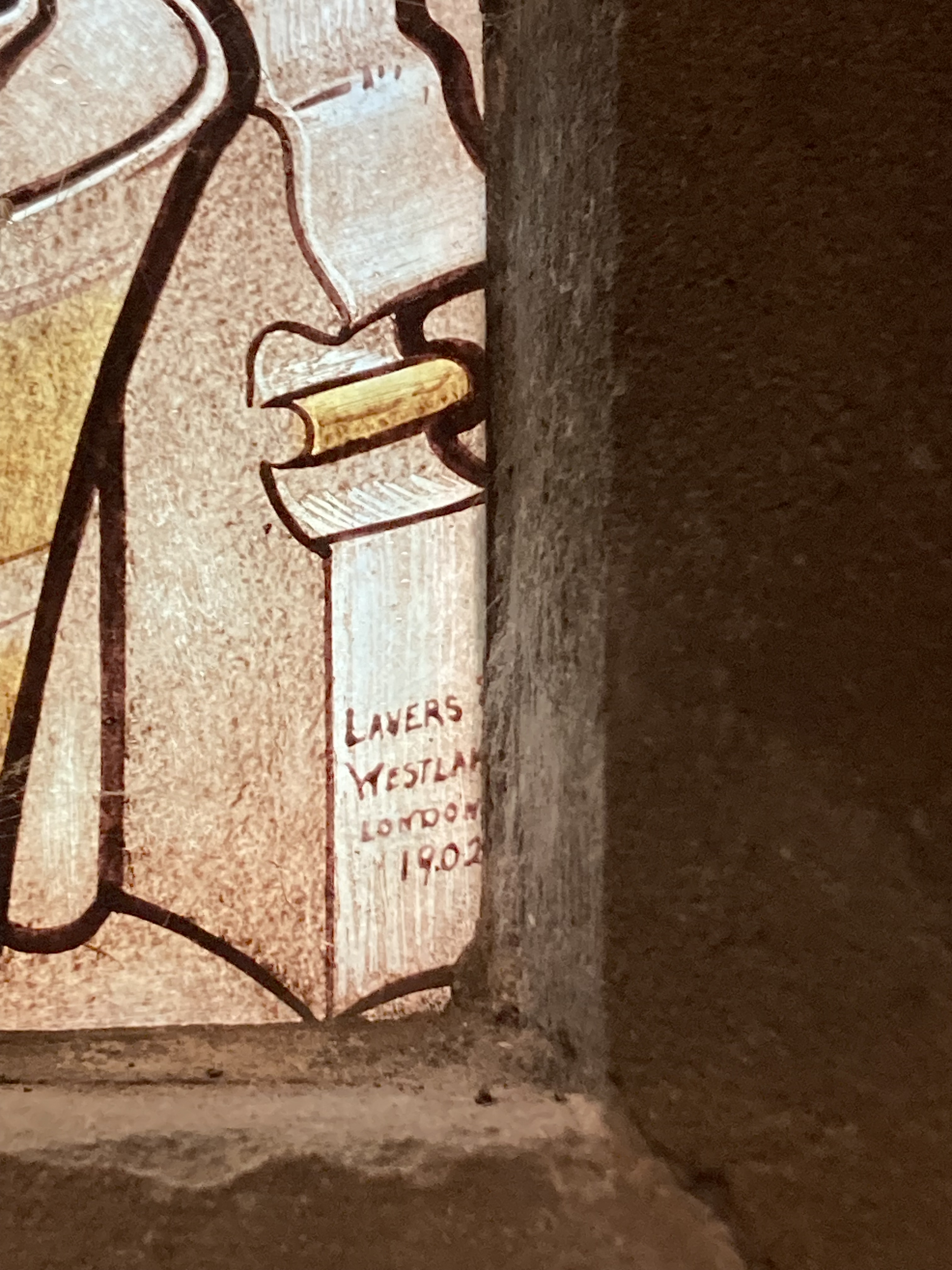
Lavers and Westlake signature from a window in Christ Church, Reading dated 1902

- Windows, Lady Chapel, and Stations of the Cross, St. Mary's Church, Ryde.
- Windows at Arundel Cathedral.
- Five-light window at Napier Cathedral, New Zealand, 1889-1890 (destroyed in 1931 earthquake).
- Windows at St Stephen's, Gloucester Road, London, 1889-1899.
- Windows at Our Lady the Immaculate Conception Church, Devizes, Wiltshire, 1909.
- Windows at All Saints, Higher Walton, Lancashire.
- Windows at Mary Datchelor Girls' School, Camberwell, south London.
- Windows at St Lawrence's Church, Westlake (Essex)
- The Gordon Window in Booloominbah
- Windows and murals at the Church of the Sacred Heart, Hove. The final work before his death was the stained glass above the doorway on the southwest side.
- Windows of Marble Chapel in Mount Stuart House, Isle of Bute.
- Windows of chapel at St Michael's Cemetery, Rivelin, Sheffield.
- Windows at All Saints Church, Kingston upon Thames.
- As Lavers and Westlake, windows in the college chapel at St. Patrick's College, Maynooth, Co. Kildare, Ireland.
- As Lavers and Westlake, windows in Christ Church, Reading, Berkshire.
- West Window of St Michael and All Angels, Ledbury, Herefordshire. The window depicts the First and Second Advent of Christ and was designed in 1882.

=== Paintings ===
- The vaulted ceiling of St Joseph's Church, Highgate (considered one of Westlake's finest works)
- Reredos in St Charles Borromeo Church, Westminster
- Reredos in All Saint's (Birchington) Parish Church, Birchington, Kent 1883
- The triptych behind the altar at St John the Divine, Richmond, London, completed in 1908. Westlake also painted the sanctuary ceiling, which illustrates passages from the Book of Revelation, chapter 14, and stations of the cross which are now missing.
- Wall paintings in St Mary Magdalene, Enfield.
- Paintings in the arcade spandrels at St Mary's, Bourne Street, London.
- The sanctuary ceiling and Stations of the Cross, Church of St Francis of Assisi, Notting Hill, London.
- Memorial in the Lady Chapel at St Stephen's, Gloucester Road, London, for Rev J P Waldo.
- St John the Baptist's Church, Brighton
- The ceiling and Stations of the Cross in the college chapel at St. Patrick's College, Maynooth, Co. Kildare, Ireland

=== Books ===
- A souvenir of the exhibition of Christian art, held at Mechlin, in September, mdccclxiv, [1864] in a series of sketches, with descriptive letterpress (1866)
- Via Crucis, the way of the Cross in fourteen stations [plates]. (1876)
- A History of Design in Painted Glass, Volume 1 (1881)
- A History of Design in Painted Glass. Four volumes (1891–1894)
- An elementary history of design in mural painting principally during the Christian era (1901)
- History of Design in Mural Painting from the Earliest Times to the Twelfth Century: From the second until the twelfth centuries AD In two volumes. (1905) J. Parker, London
- The dance: historic illustrations of dancing from 3300 B.C. to 1911 A.D., by an antiquary. (1911)

== Gallery ==
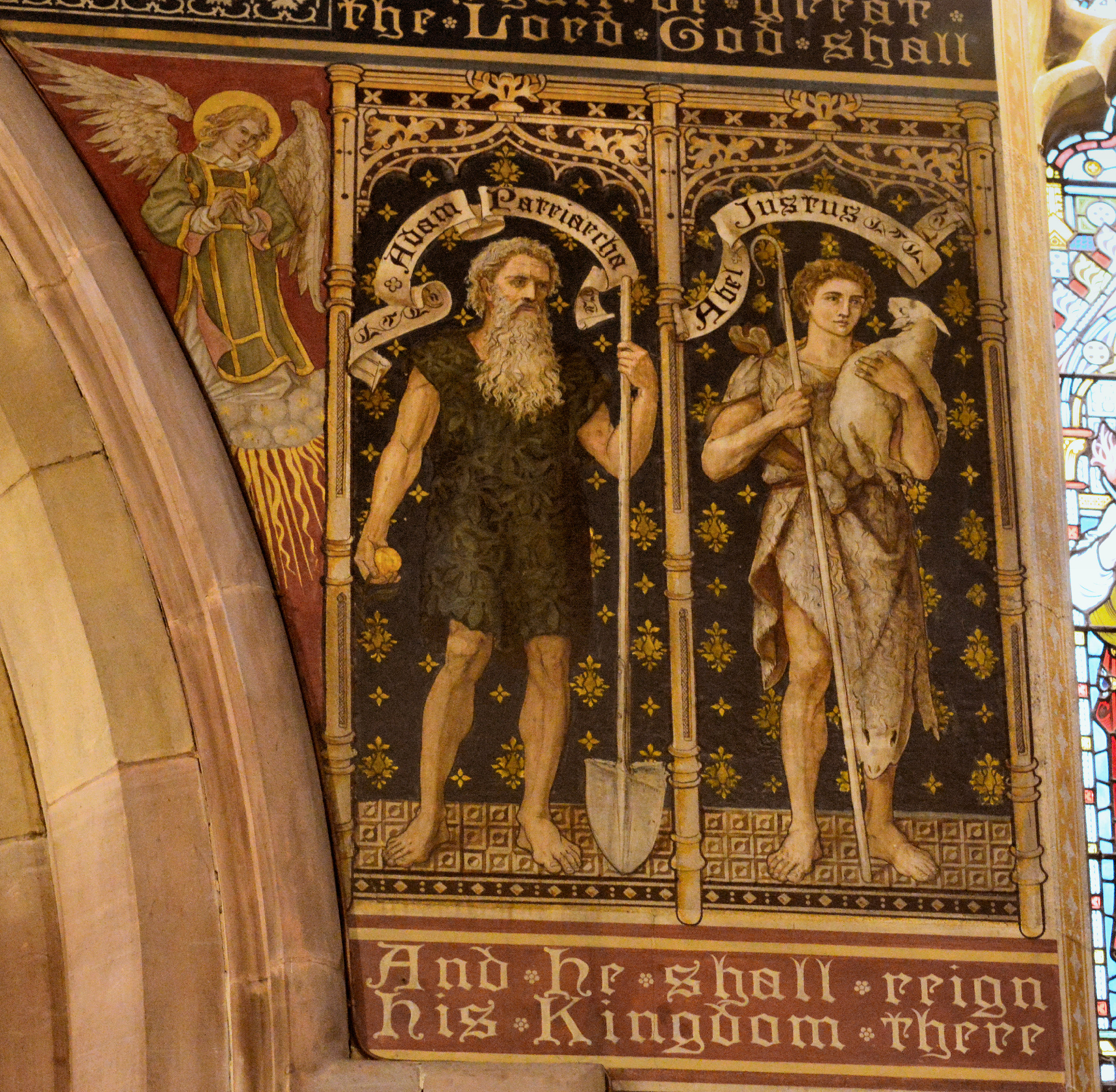
St Mary Magdalene, Enfield

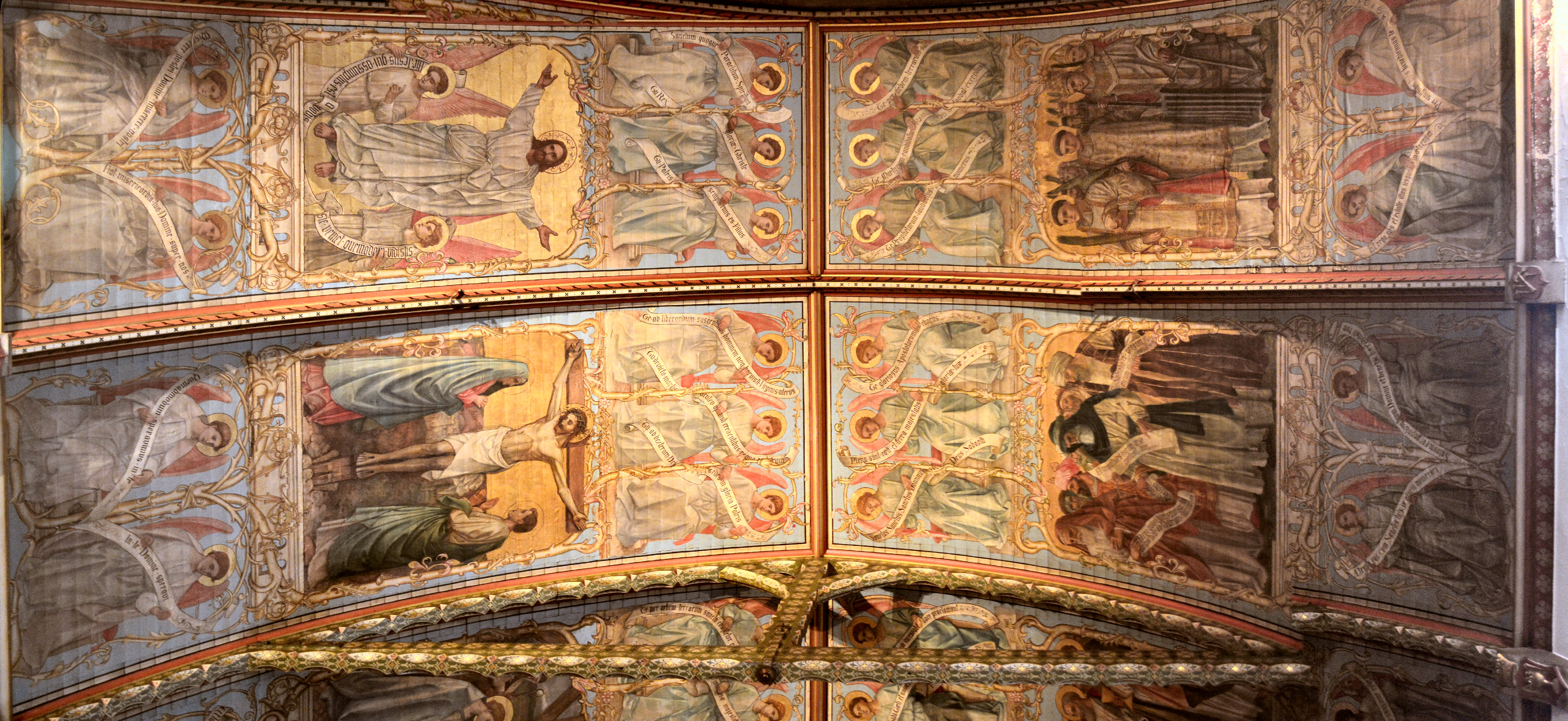
Ceiling, St John the Divine, Richmond

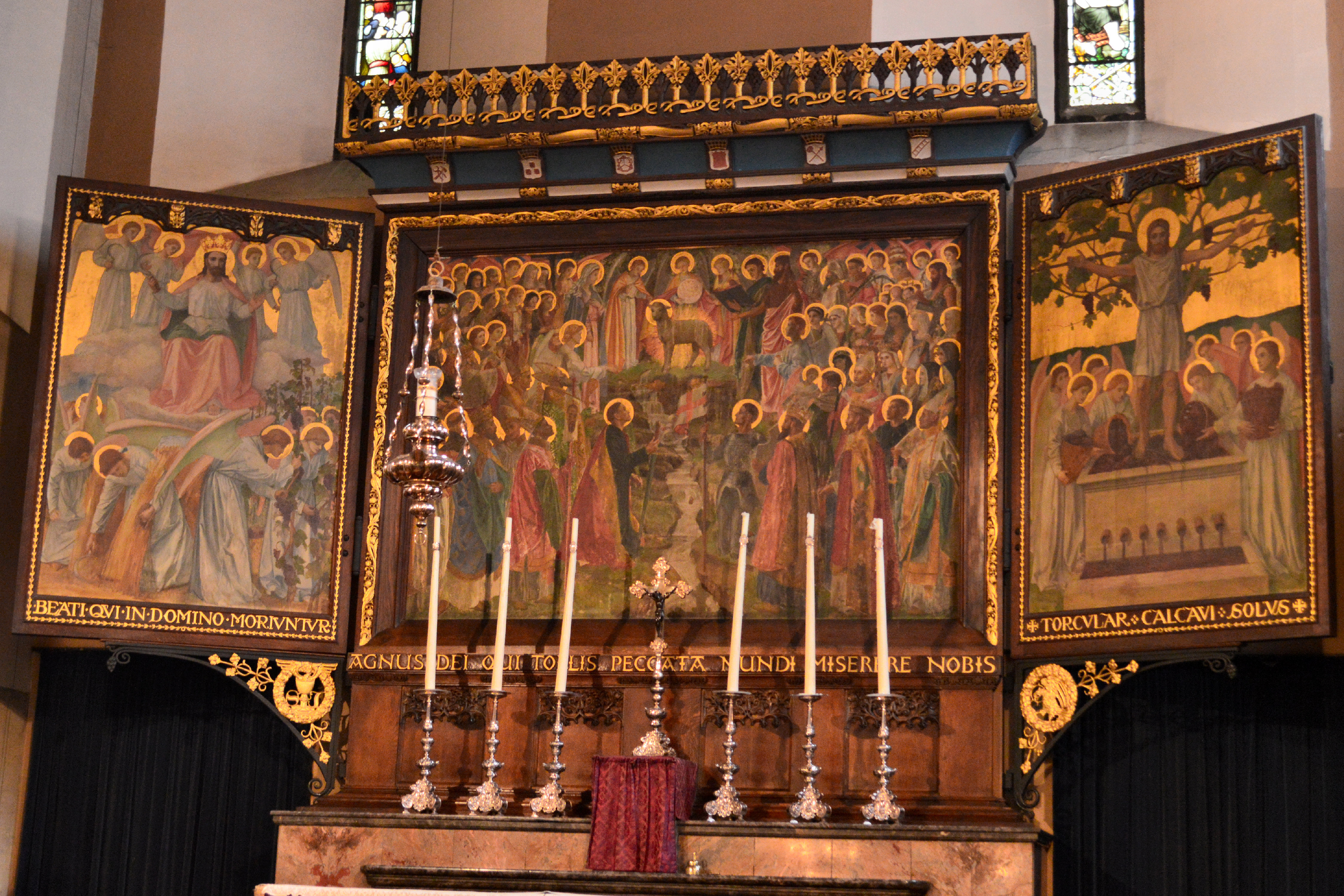
Triptych, St John the Divine, Richmond

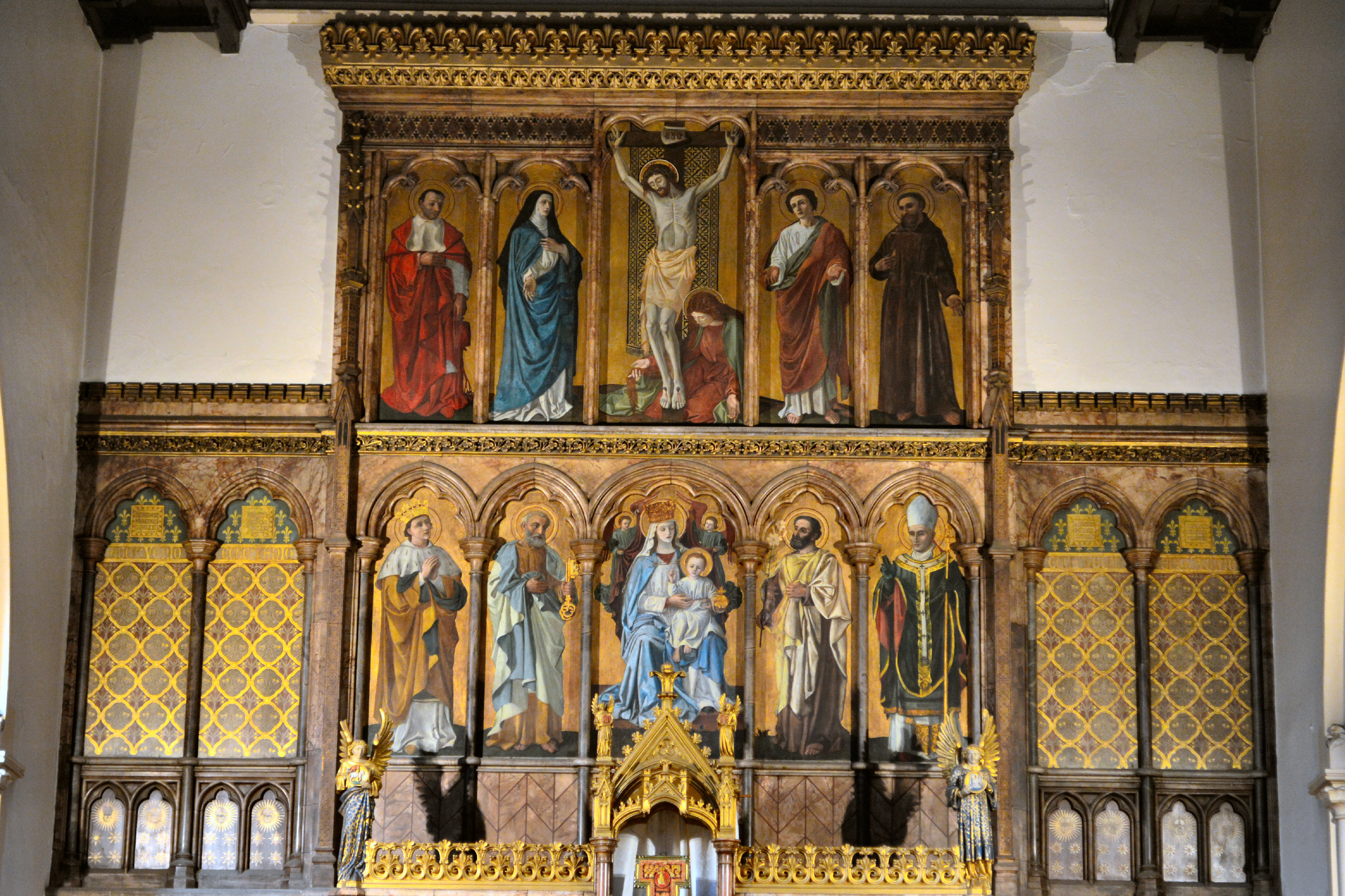
St Charles Borromeo Catholic Church, high altar reredos

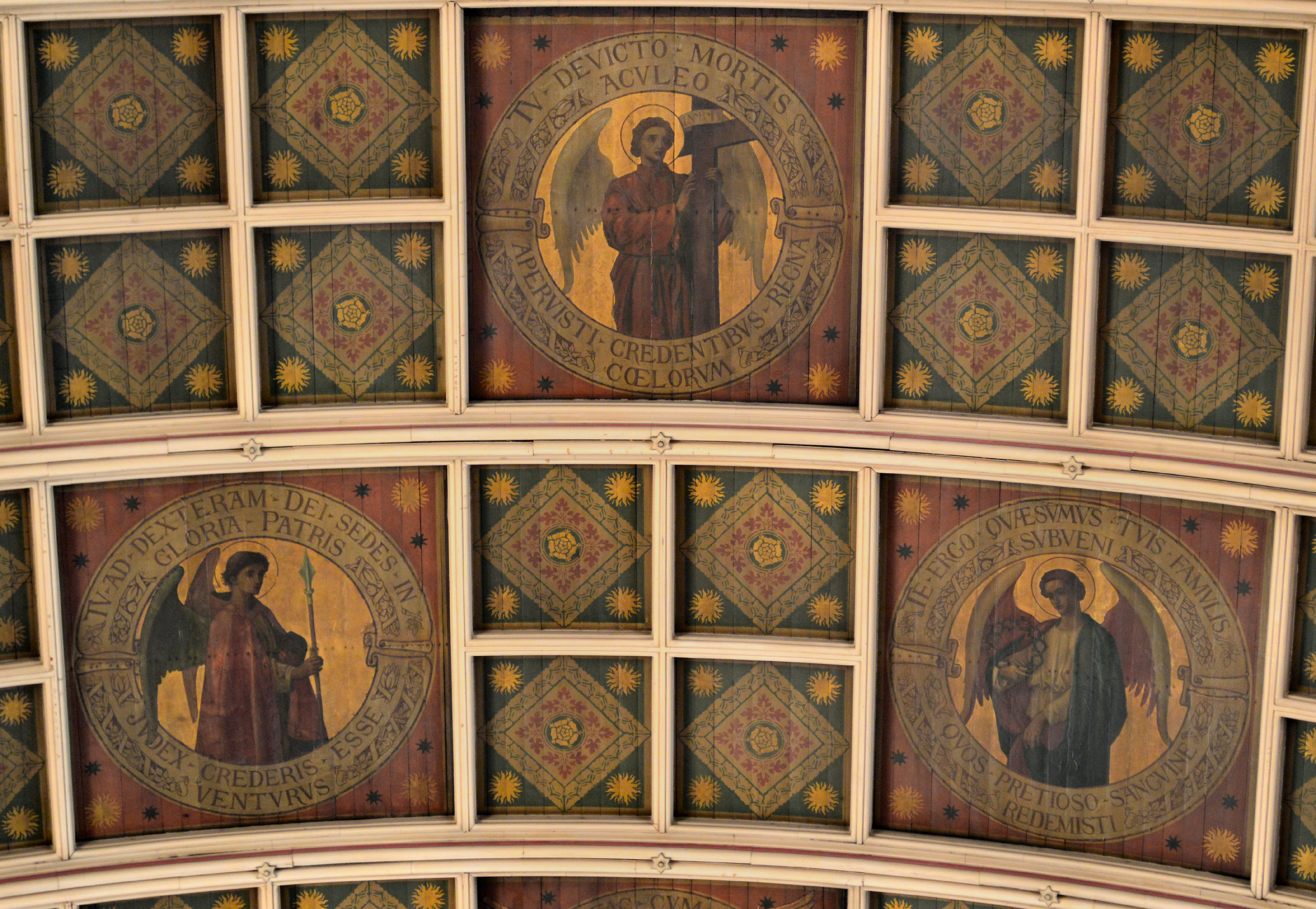
Painted ceiling at St Joseph's Church, Highgate

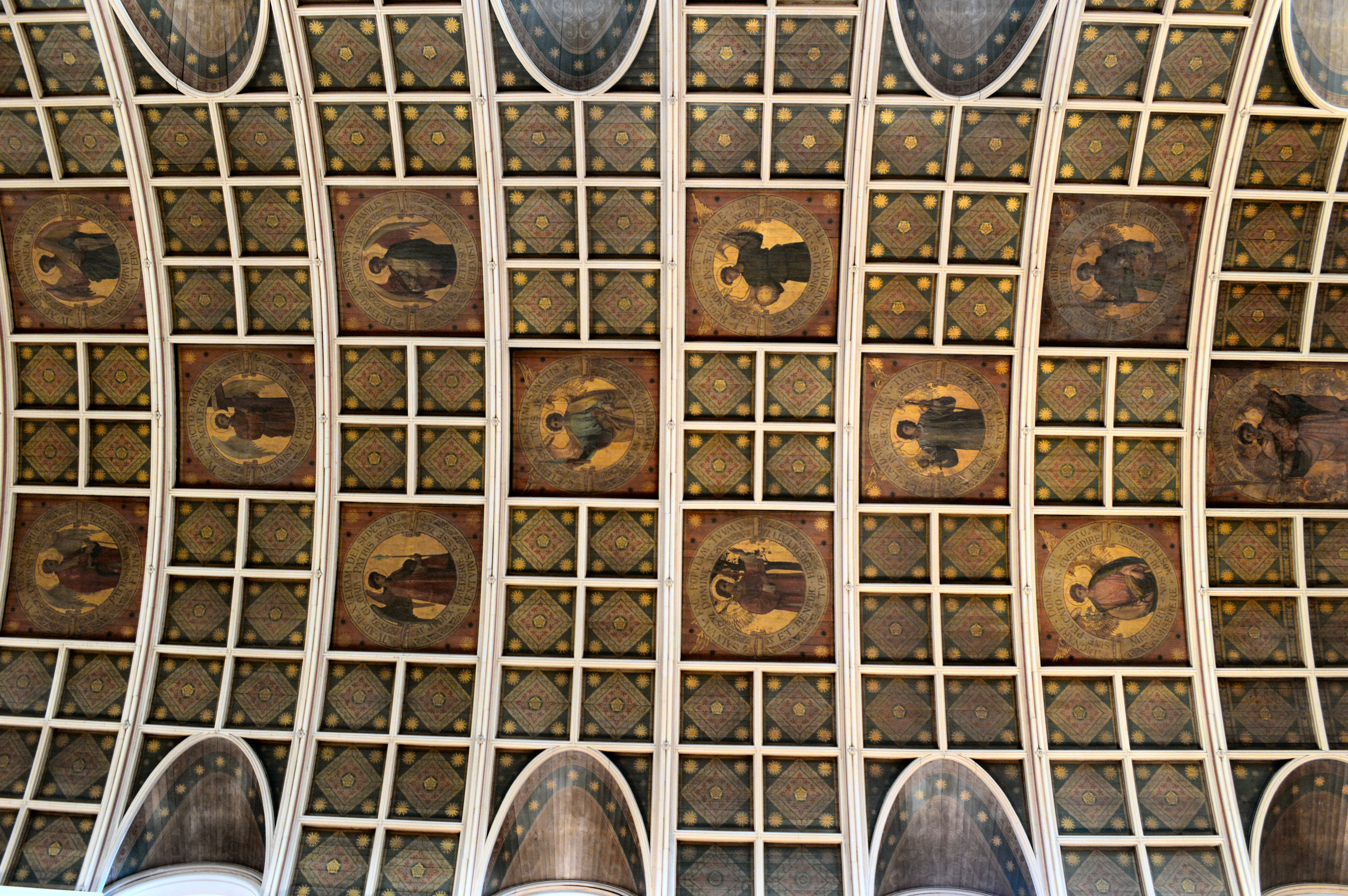
Painted ceiling at St Joseph's Church, Highgate

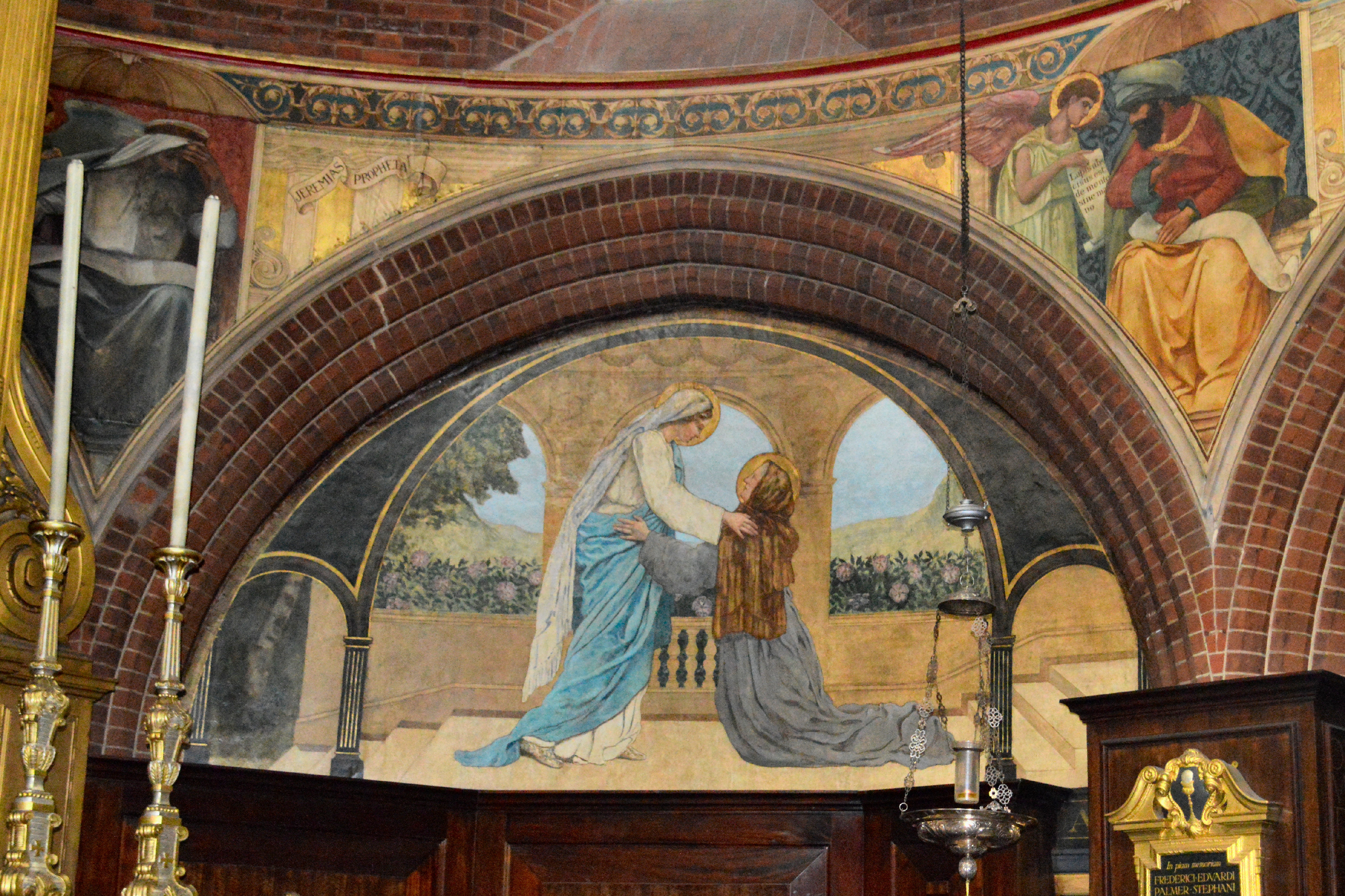
St Mary's Church, Bourne Street

== Plaque ==
There is a plaque on 20 Endell Street, which was Westlake's home during the 1880s, next to the offices of Lavers and Barraud.
