= All Saints Church, Kingston upon Thames =

All Saints
- All Saints Church
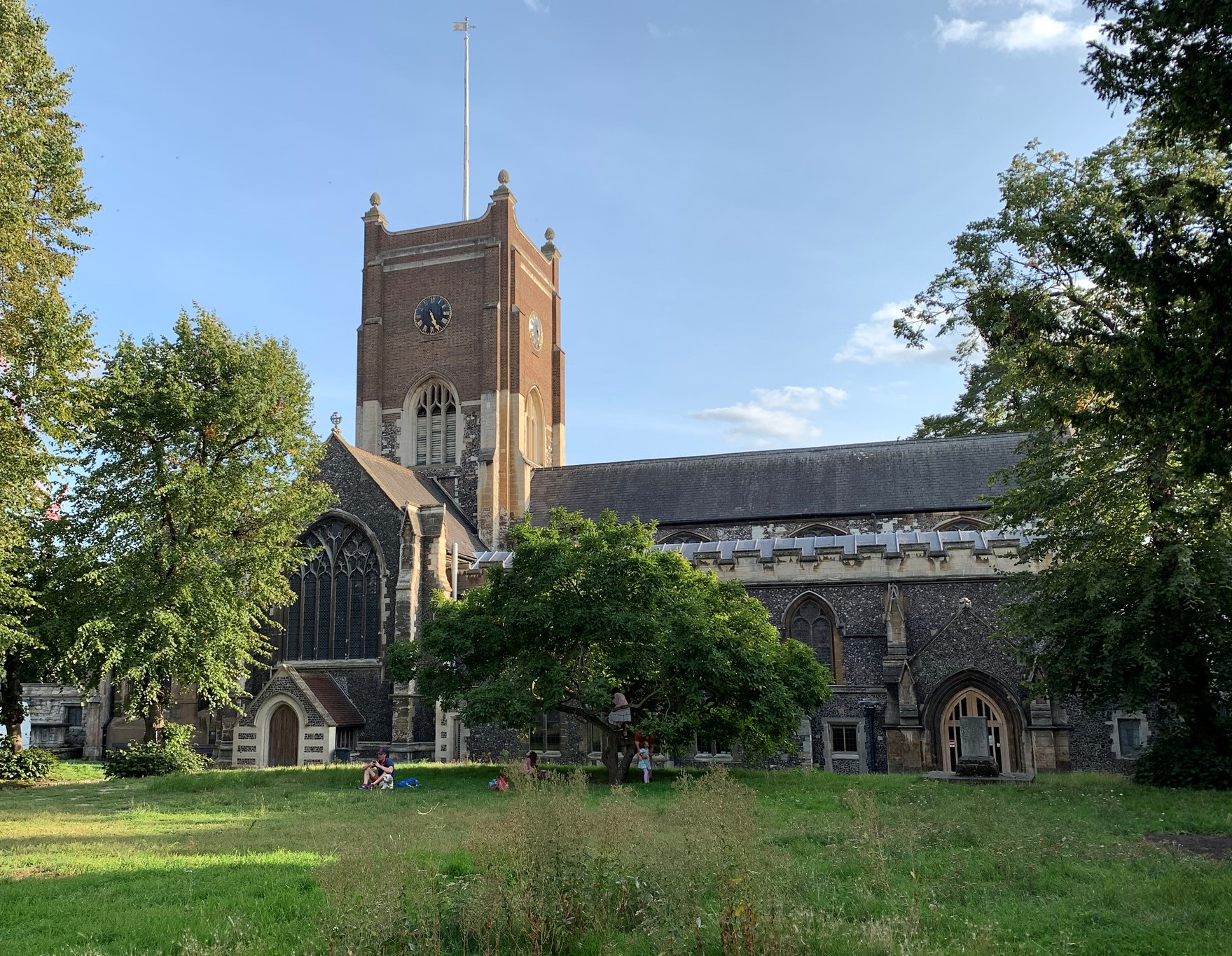
- South-facing view from Clarence Street
- All Saints
- 51.4104°N 0.3061°W
- OS grid reference: TQ 17903 69300
- Location: Market Place, Kingston upon Thames
- Country: England
- Denomination: Church of England
- Website: allsaintskingston.co.uk

Architecture
- Style: Norman, Decorated, Perpendicular
- Years built: 1120

Administration
- Diocese: Southwark
- Archdeaconry: Wandsworth
- Deanery: Kingston
- Parish: Kingston

Clergy
- Rector: Joe Moffatt

Listed Building – Grade I
- Designated: 30 July 1951
- Reference no.: 1358437

All Saints Church is the historic parish church of Kingston upon Thames in southwest London, and is set between the ancient Market Place and the main shopping centre. It forms part of the Diocese of Southwark and together with St John the Evangelist, and St John the Baptist, Kingston Vale, it forms a team of Anglican churches serving residents, businesses, schools and Kingston University. The church is the only Grade I listed building (but not structure) in Kingston.

A church at Kingston sprang up in Saxon times and Egbert, king of Wessex, held his great council at the site in 838. Seven Saxon kings of England, including Æthelstan and Æthelred the Unready, were crowned here in the 10th century. The current church was begun in 1120 under the orders of Henry I and has been developed since then. It is a cruciform church with a central tower and a four-bay nave, with Perpendicular clerestory, choir, north and south aisles, transepts and chapels. The exterior is of flint with stone dressings and a parapet of stone battlements.

== History ==
Edward the Elder was crowned in Kingston in 900 at the Coronation Stone, as was his son Athelstan in 925. In the following years Kingston was the site of the consecrations of Edmund I in 940, Eadred in 946, Eadwig in 955, Edward the Martyr in 975 and, finally, Ethelred, who was crowned by Bishop Oswald of Worcester in 978.

Outside the south door of the present building are some outlines marked by stones, which are all that remain of the Saxon church and chapel of St Mary. The present church was begun in 1120 under the orders of Henry I and has been developed since then. During the 14th century, the Norman nave was widened. The chancel and the chapels of the Holy Trinity to the north and St James to the south were added during the 15th century. The original high wooden spire on top of the tower was struck by lightning and almost entirely destroyed in 1445 and was rebuilt in 1505. In 1600, the church was described at vestry meeting as being "much out of repair and there being a need for a speedy repair of the same in several places ... to prevent further damages and inconvenience." The tower was taken down to the level of the nave and was strengthened and rebuilt in 1708 in brick, with dipped parapet and pineapple ornaments on the corners. The chapel of St Mary, which stood at the south-east of the church, next to the south chapel of St James, was pulled down in 1730 after some of the walls fell, killing the sexton.

The church was much restored in the 19th century, by Brandon from 1862 to 1866 and Pearson in 1883. A 12th-century doorway was discovered in the west wall of the nave in about 1865 but destroyed. Ceilings were reconstructed and the organ gallery at the west end was removed. In the 1890s, remaining galleries were removed and new roofs provided to the nave, aisles and transepts. After the First World War, the choir vestry was built on the north wall and a memorial chapel dedicated to the East Surrey Regiment. The same regiment also has a set of memorial gates at the south entrance to the churchyard, on Market Place (the regiment's badge appears over them). The gates were formally opened on Remembrance Sunday 1924 by the Bishop of Kingston, Percy Herbert. The gates became a separate Grade II listed building in April 2016; the church is Grade I listed.

=== Interior ===
The church contains a 14th-century wall painting of St Blaise, a 17th-century marble font attributed to Sir Christopher Wren, twelve bells and an 18th-century carillon, the great west window of the 19th century, and the Frobenius organ installed in 1988.

There are embroideries of four of the seven kings crowned in Kingston, made by Jacky Puzey to designs by Sophia Pearson with beading by Beatrice Mayfield of the Royal School of Needlework. These are:

Æthelstan (924-939), first King of England. Crowned in Kingston in 925.

Edmund (939-946), half brother of Athelstan. Known as a law maker. Captured the Vikings Raven banner 878. The stag is from a legend of how Edmund granted Glastonbury to Dunstan. Crowned 1 December 939 in Kingston.

Eadred (946-955). Defeated Eric Bloodaxe in 954 to bring Northumbria under English control. The flames are burning Ripon Minster. Coronation 16 August 946 in Kingston upon Thames.

Eadwig (955-959). King at 15. At his coronation feast, January 956, he left to consort with his wife. He ruled lands south of the Thames while Edgar ruled that to the north.

=== Memorials ===
There are several notable monuments in the church.

There is a memorial by John Bacon the younger to Peter de la Rive Esq. of Hampton Wick. He was a merchant in London originally from Geneva, who died in 1803 aged 97, leaving his house to his housekeeper.

Cesar Picton (c. 1755–1836) has a simple memorial on the south wall of the nave. He was presumably enslaved in Africa by the time he was about six years old. He was bought and brought to England by an English army officer who had been in Senegal, and in 1761 was "presented" as a servant to Sir John Philipps, who lived at Norbiton Place, near Kingston. When Lady Philipps died she left him £100 and he became a wealthy coal merchant in Kingston.

There is a memorial to Edmund Staunton (1600-1671), vicar of Kingston 1633–1658, and ten of his children.

There are several incised ledger stones in the floor of the chancel, now the seating area for the cafe. These include ones for William Cleave (d 1667), who founded Cleaves Almshouses, John Milner, Her Majesty's Consul General to the Kingdom of Portugal (d. 1712 in Lisbon), Samuel Robinson, Secretary to the Company of Merchant Adventurers (d. 1625), and Dr William Evelyn St Lawrence Finny (1864-1952), physician, local politician (Mayor of Kingston seven times) and historian, author of 'All Saints, Kingston upon Thames (1930)'.

==== Brass for Robert Skerne ====
There is a monumental brass to Robert Skerne (d 1437) and his wife Joanna. He was a lawyer and MP for Surrey in 1420 and again in 1422. They had a house, Down Hall, near the river.

Another brass, which is damaged, is to the merchant John Hertcombe (d 1488) and his wife Katherine.

==== Sir Anthony Benn ====
In a recess on the south wall of the south chapel is the tomb of Sir Anthony Benn, Recorder of Kingston and afterwards Recorder of London, who died in 1618, containing his recumbent effigy in his lawyer's robe and ruff collar and cuffs.

==== Louisa Theodosia, Countess of Liverpool ====
Between the south door and the tower is the sculpture of Countess Louisa Theodosia (1767-1821), gracefully seated in meditation, by Sir Francis Chantrey. She was the wife of Lord Liverpool, Prime Minister (1812-1827). The inscription on the back records that "She visited the fatherless and widows in their affliction and kept herself unspotted from the world." Their country house was Coombe House near Kingston, where she died. The statue was originally in Coombe House and moved to the church on Lord Liverpool's death. While Louisa was buried at Hawkesbury, Gloucestershire, Lord Liverpool's second wife, Mary was interred at All Saints after her death in October 1846.

==== Davidson memorials ====
There are two memorials in the eastern end of the south transept to members of the Scottish Davidson family, merchants and slave owners.

The monument for Duncan Davidson (1733-1799) is of a woman weeping over an urn and is by the sculptor Charles Regnart. He was a West India merchant with premises at 14 Fenchurch Buildings, London, who owned Tulloch Castle, Ross-shire, inheriting from Henry (d. 1781), his elder brother and business partner. He was a Member of Parliament for Cromartyshire 1790–1796. The family owned plantations in Jamaica, Surinam and Grenada.

The monument which shows Henry Davidson (1771-1827) relaxed and seated on a chair, is by the sculptor John Ternouth. Henry Davidson, the son of Duncan Davidson and Louisa (née Spencer), was a merchant, plantation owner, and a director of the Bank of England, who died at Rosslyn House, Hampstead. The urn records his wife, Elizabeth Caroline (née Deffell), who died the year after her husband.

==== Monument for Sir Philip Medows ====
This monument by John Flaxman, is of a winged cherub by an urn, facing out, holding open the pages of a book. Sir Philip Medows (1717-1781), was deputy ranger of Richmond Park and husband of Lady Frances Pierrepont, daughter of the Earl of Kingston upon Hull.

=== Stained glass ===
The church contains twenty stained glass windows, mostly belonging to the Victorian Gothic Revival period, the earliest dating from 1852. Five were designed by Nathaniel Westlake for Lavers and Barraud; Nathaniel Lavers (1828-1911) lived in Long Ditton and donated one of the windows. Other windows in the south transept and the south wall of the nave are by Burlison and Grylls and date from Pearson's restoration of the 1880s.

| Location | By | Date | Photograph | Description | Notes | Ref |
|---|---|---|---|---|---|---|
| South aisle east window | Possibly Ward and Nixon | 1852 | | Christ and the four Evangelists. | Dedicated to the vicar Samuel Gandy (d 1851) | |
| East window | Henry Hughes of Ward and Hughes | 1860 | | Scenes from the life of Christ, with the Crucifixion in the centre | | |
| Chancel south wall eastern window | William Wailes | 1861 | | The angels announcing the birth of Jesus to the shepherds. | Donated by William Mercer in memory of his four daughters | |
| South aisle central window | Burlison and Grylls | 1886 | | St Peter and the Centurion Cornelius. | In memory of Major William Anthony Grey-Smith, (1849-1886) 70th and East Surrey Regiments. | |
| Holy Trinity Chapel, East window | Nathaniel Westlake for Lavers and Barraud | 1860 | | Scenes from the Old Testament: Abel's sacrifice, Noah, Crossing the Red Sea, Jacob blessing the sons of Joseph. | In memory of George Reynell (1785-1859) | |
| Holy Trinity Chapel, eastern window on north wall | Christopher Webb | 1953 | | St Michael slaying the dragon. Arms of the East Surrey Regiment, Ireland, the Longley family, and a Jerusalem cross. | In memory of Major General Sir John Raynsford Longley and his son Charles who was killed at the Battle of Jutland (1916). | |
| Holy Trinity Chapel, western window on north wall | Christopher Webb | 1928 | | St George slaying the dragon, Arms of the East Surrey Regiment, England, the Pearse family, and Scotland. | In memory of Col. Hugh Wodehouse Pearse DSO. | |
| North aisle eastern window | Lowndes and Drury | 1956 | | Four roundels and other pieces of 15th & 16th century glass from the Thomas and Drake collection | | |
| North aisle west wall window | Nathaniel Westlake for Lavers and Barraud | 1866 | | The three Maries at the Tomb. | In memory of Charles Octavius Parnell | |
| North aisle western window | Lowndes and Drury | 1956 | | Arms of King's College, Cambridge and Henry VI. Arms attributed to the Saxon king Edward the Elder, son of Alfred the Great, crowned at Kingston. The arms of Merton Abbey, Patrons of the living from All Saints’ | | |
| North clerestory window | Lavers and Barraud | 1860 | | St Andrew, St Peter, St James. | | |
| South aisle eastern window | Burlison and Grylls | 1887 | | Martha and Mary | | |
| South aisle western window | Burlison and Grylls | 1920 | | St Michael and the dragon, angels with trumpets | In memory of Lieut. Col Francis Richard Pennefather Kane (1854-1920), East Surrey Regiment. | |
| South clerestory window | Lavers and Barraud | 1860 | | Isaiah, Jeremiah, Ezekiel | | |
| South transept west aisle window | Burlison and Grylls | 1887 | | "Nunc Dimittris", the song of Simeon, presentation of Jesus in the Temple. Mary, Simeon with Jesus, Anna. | In memory of Robert Thomas Kent and Abiah Kent. | |
| South transept window | Burlison and Grylls | 1886 | | The "Magnificat", the annunciation. | In memory of John Shrubsole. | |
| South wall chancel western window | Nathaniel Westlake for Lavers and Barraud | 1861 | | Scenes from the life of Abraham | | |
| Vicar's burial ground east window | Nathaniel Westlake for Lavers and Barraud | 1860 | | Jesus healing of a woman with issue of blood, with Martha and Mary, raising Jairus' daughter. | Given by Lavers in memory of his father and sister. | |
| South aisle west wall window | Nathaniel Westlake for Lavers and Barraud | 1880 | | Jesus with his disciples and children. | In memory of Henry Shrubsole. | |
| West window | Possibly designed by John Milner Allen for Lavers and Barraud | 1863 | | Christ in Majesty, surrounded by the apostles, with 24 elders from the book of Revelation. | In memory of William and Susannah Wilhelmina Sandford. | |

== Gallery ==
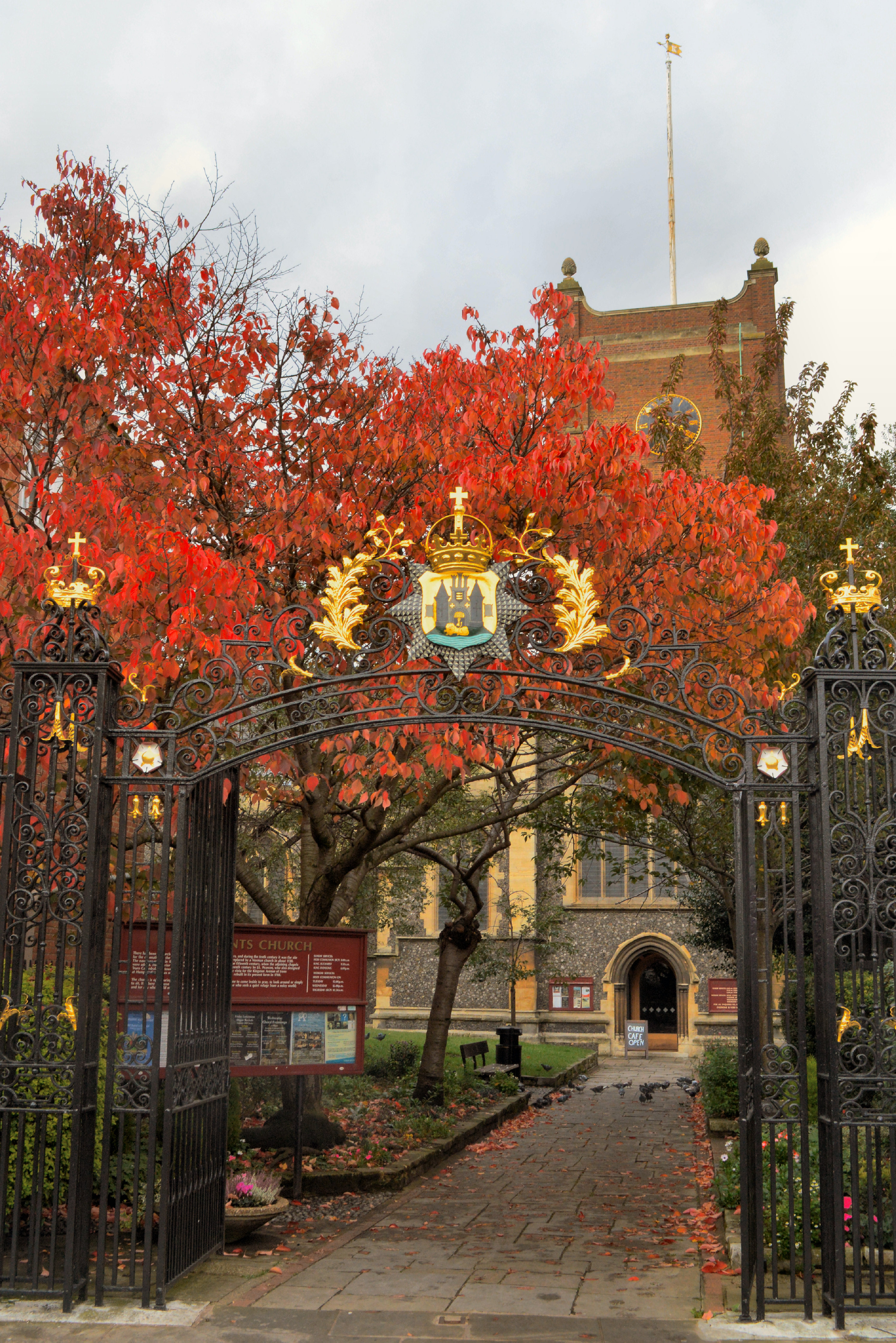
Memorial gates

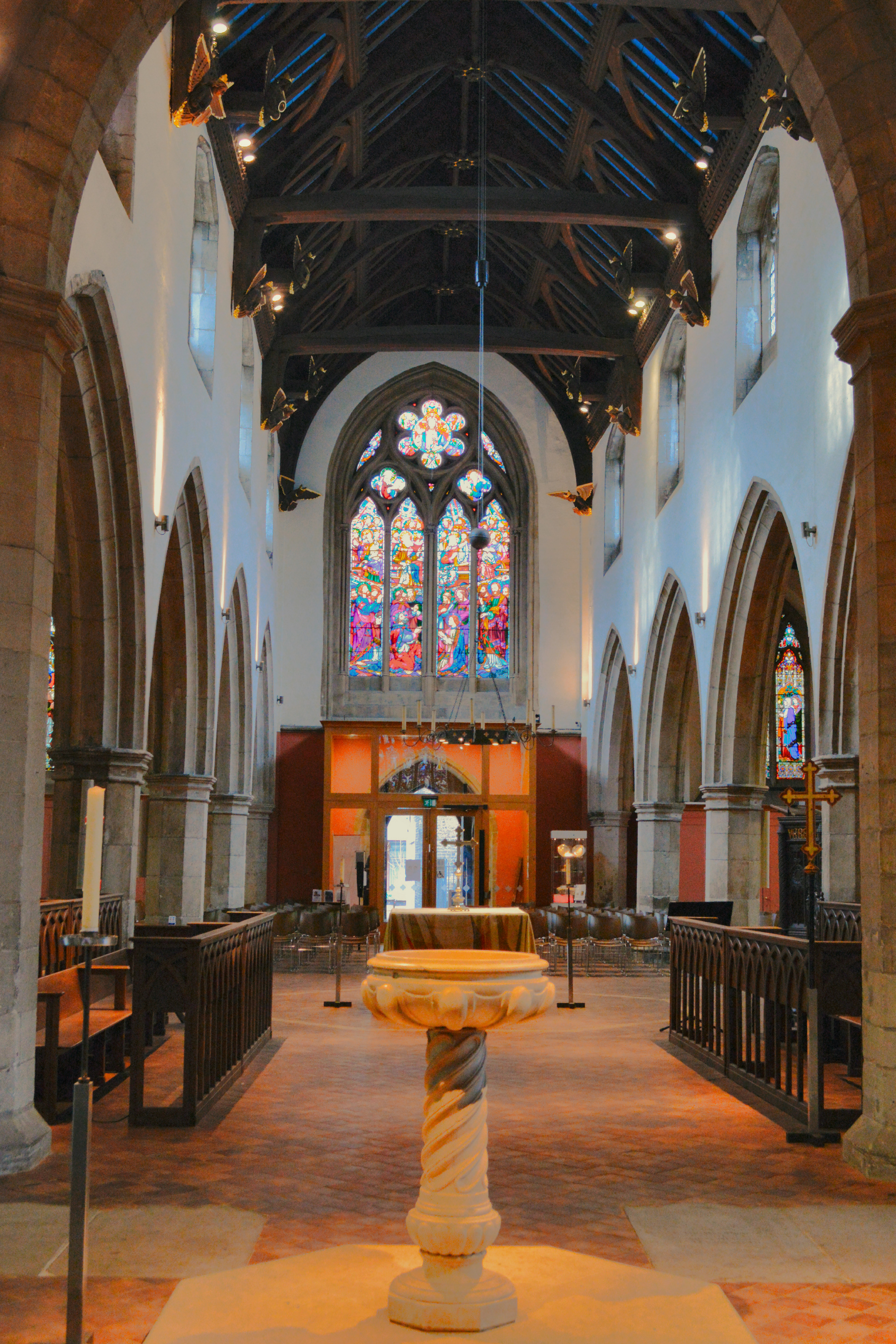
Chancel

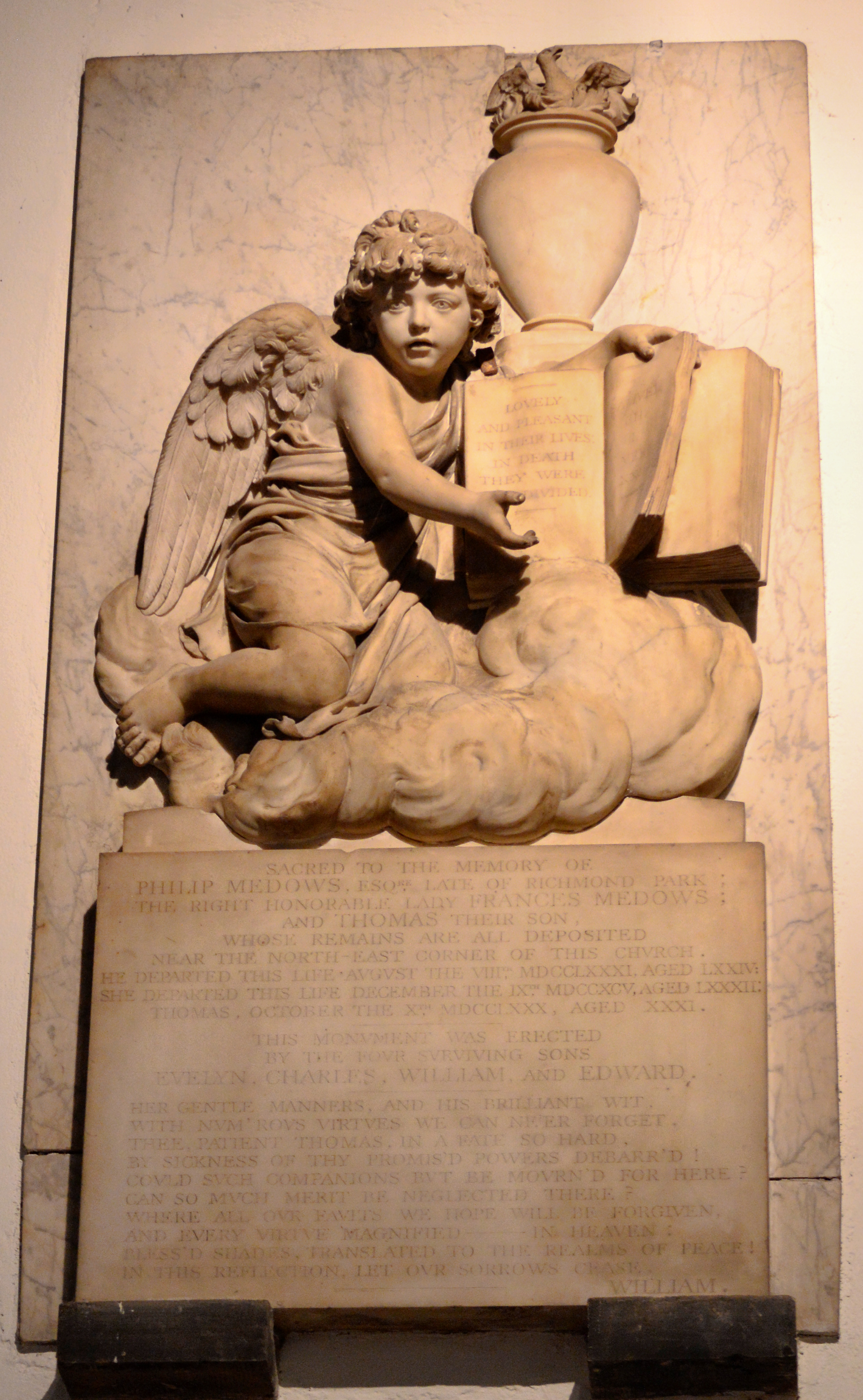
Philip Medows monument by John Flaxman

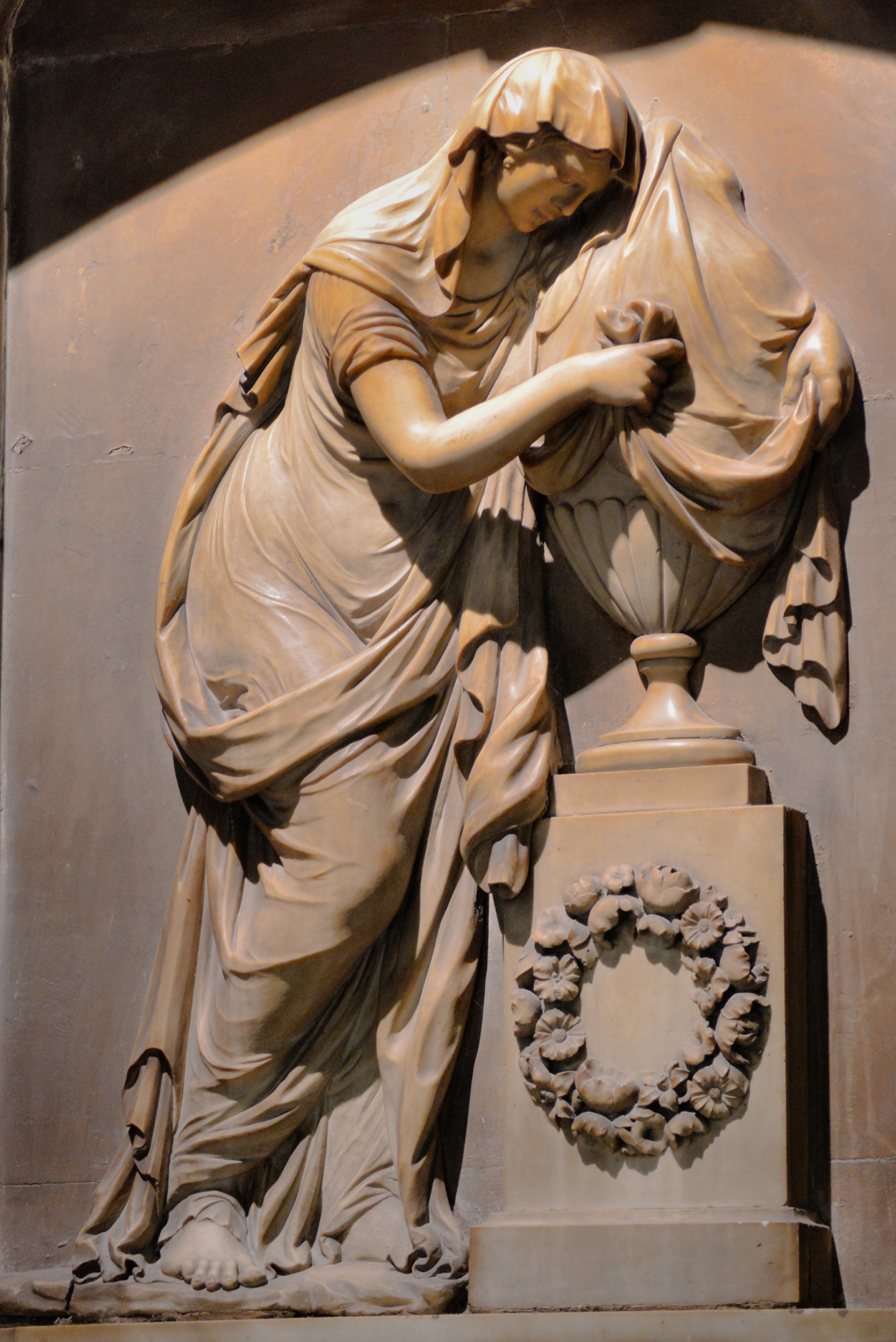
Davidson memorial by Charles Regnart

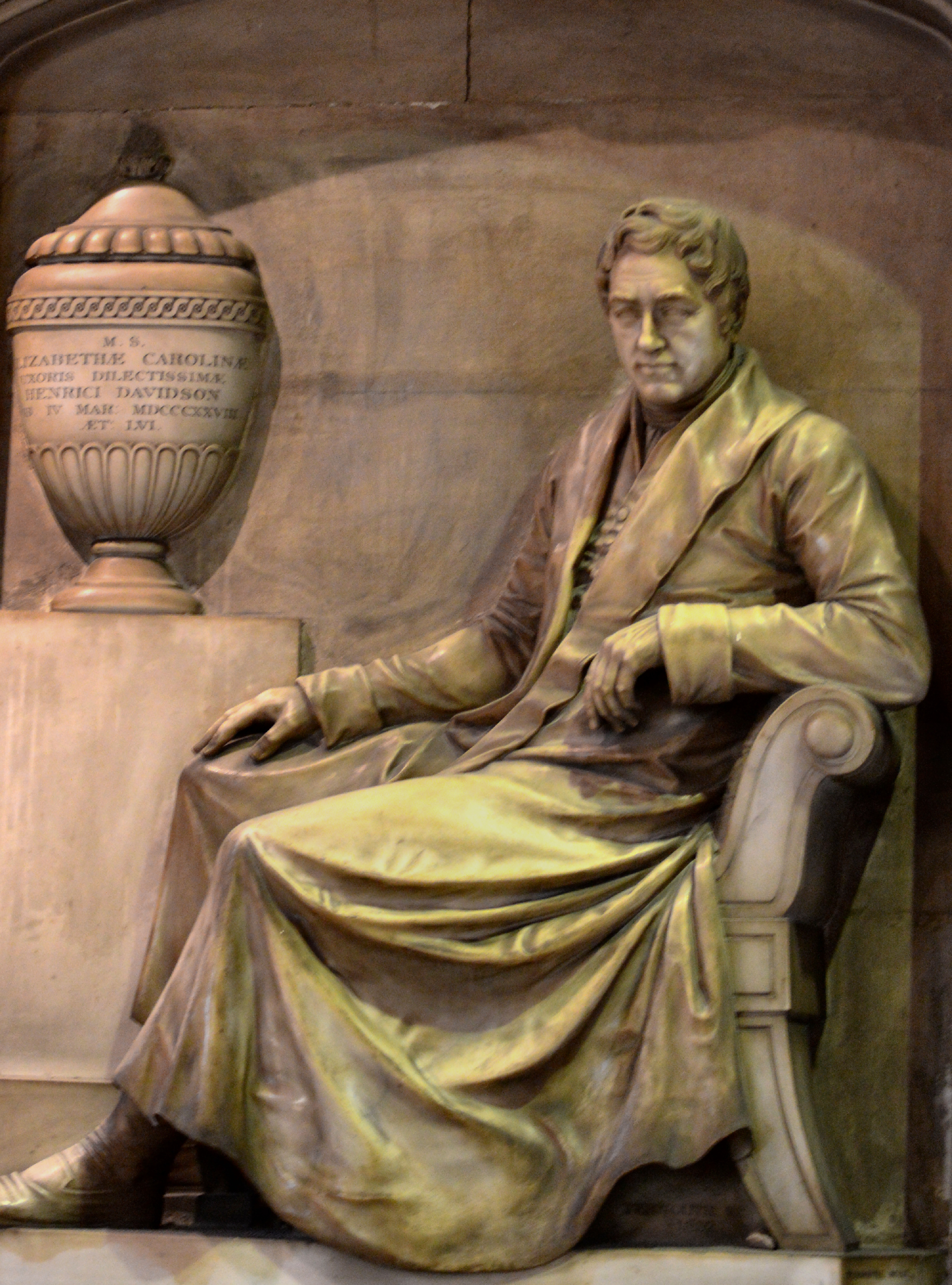
Henry Davidson memorial by John Ternouth
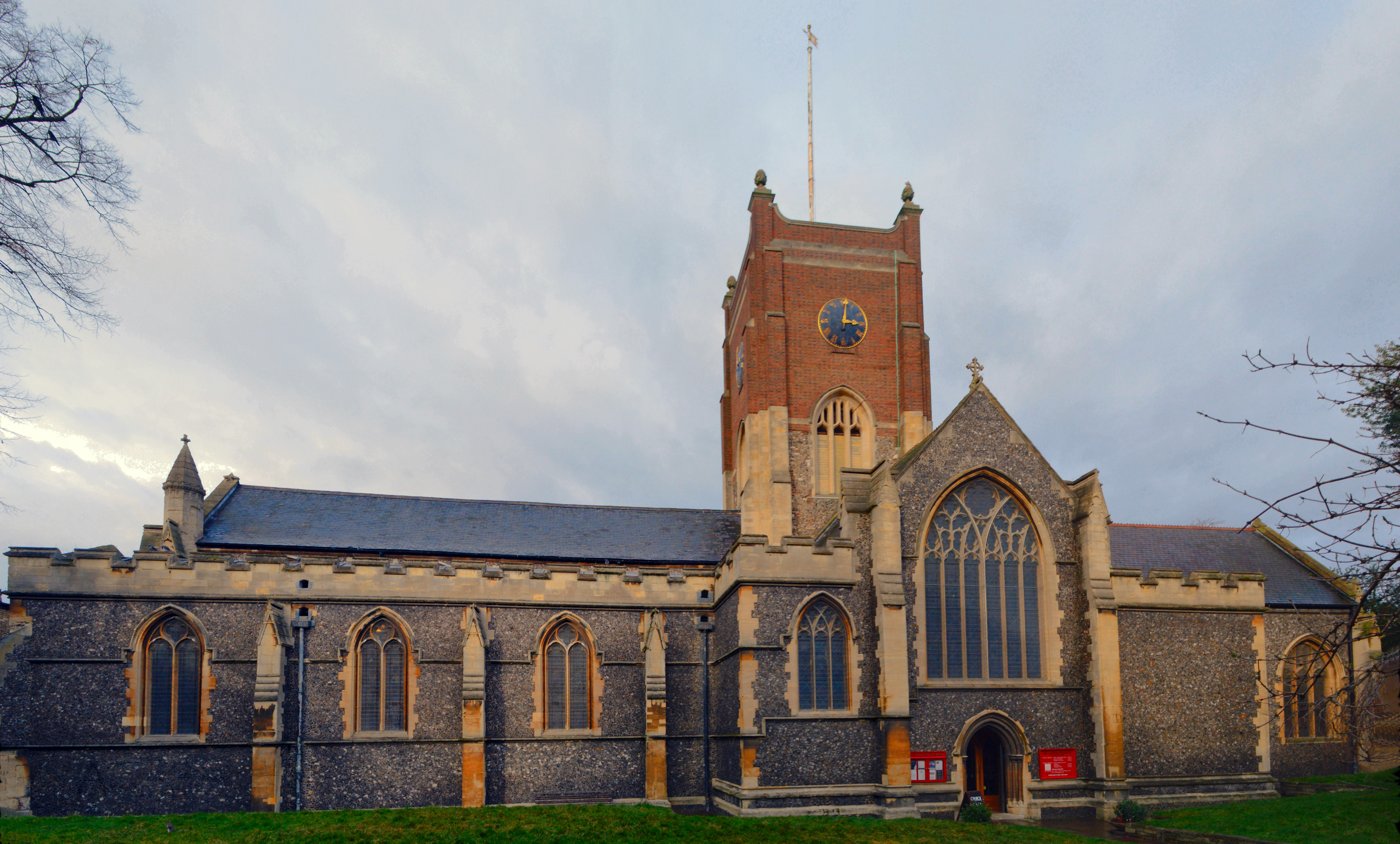
All Saints Church

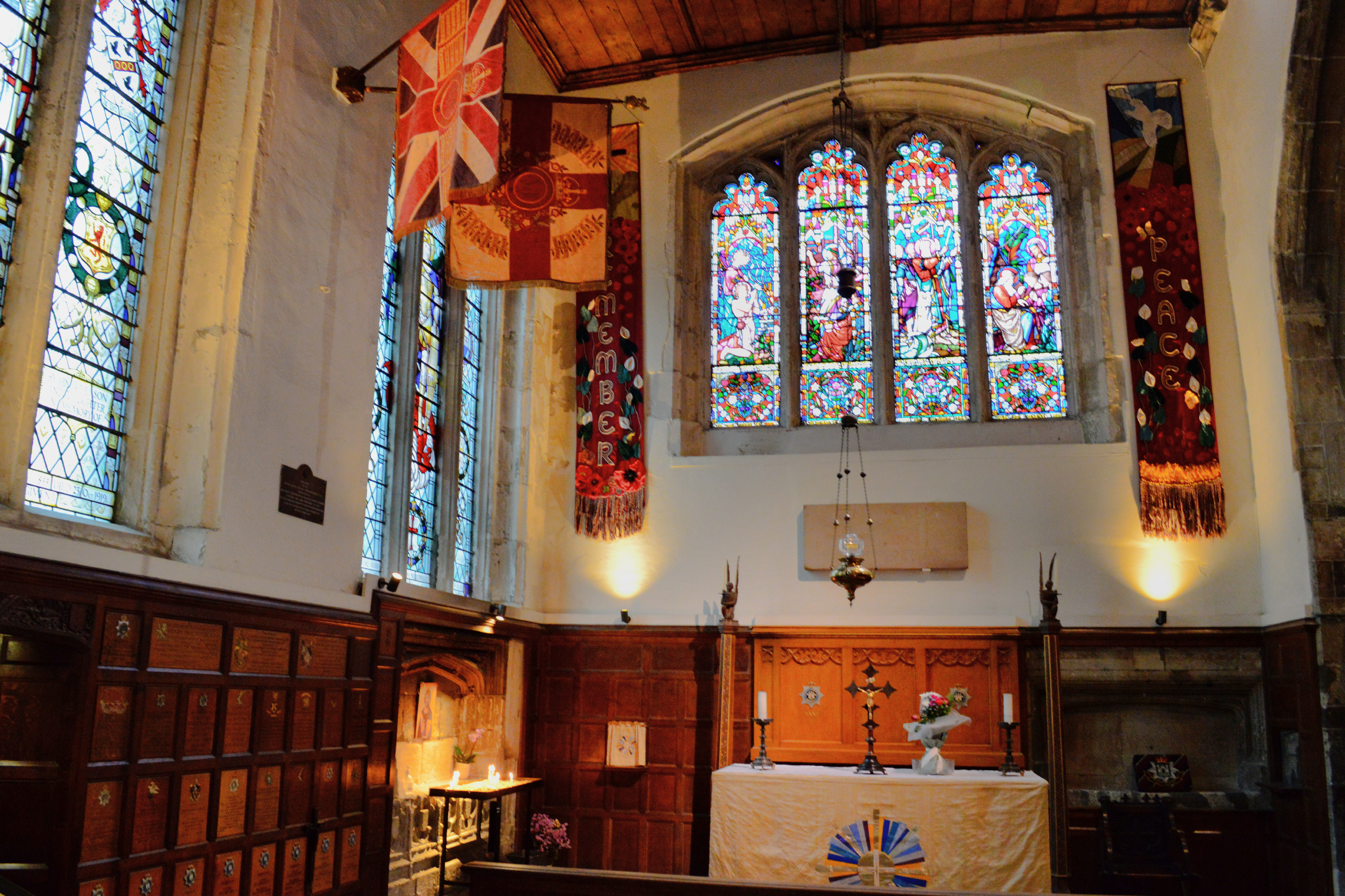
Holy Trinity Chapel

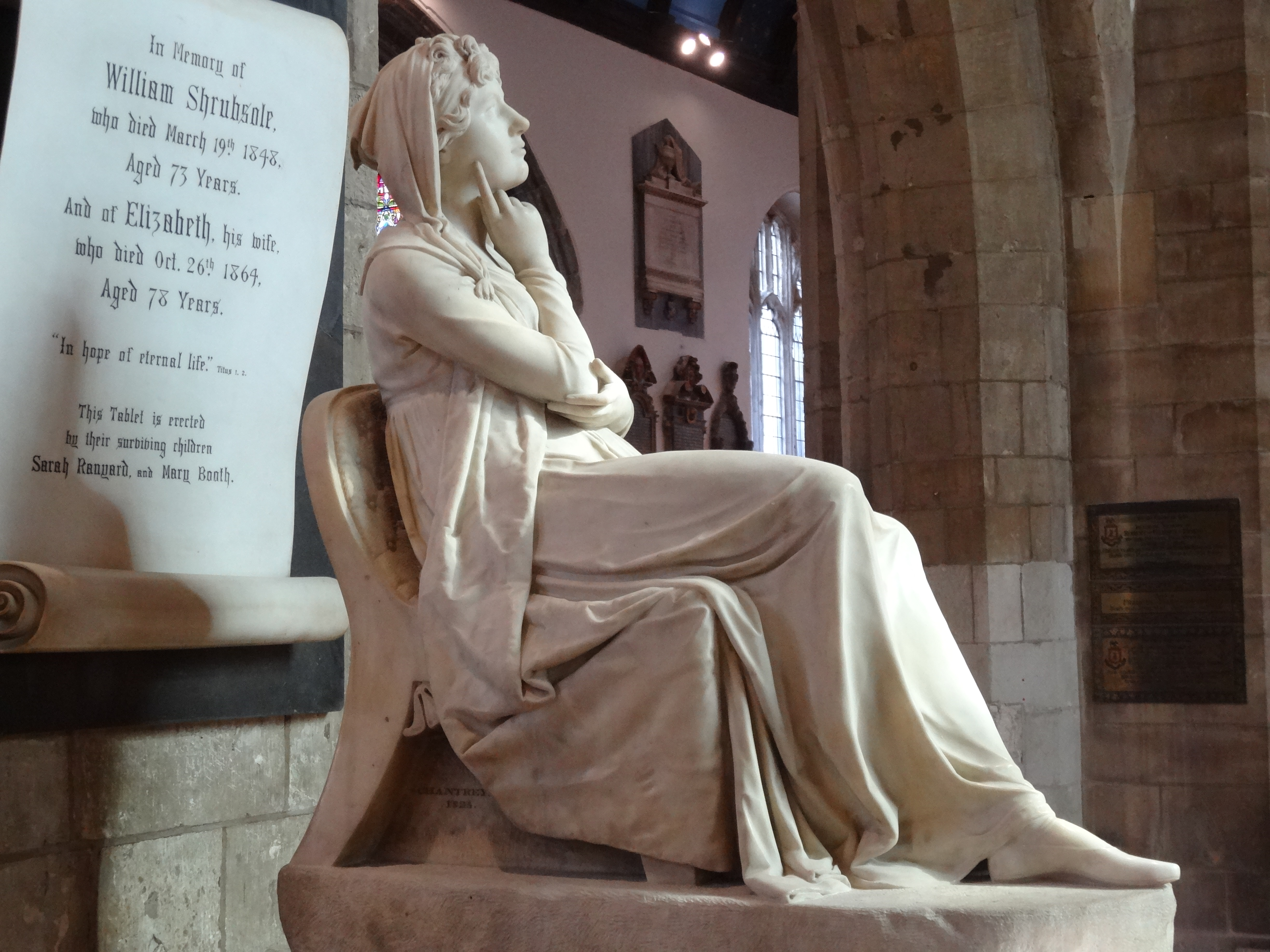
Countess of Liverpool memorial

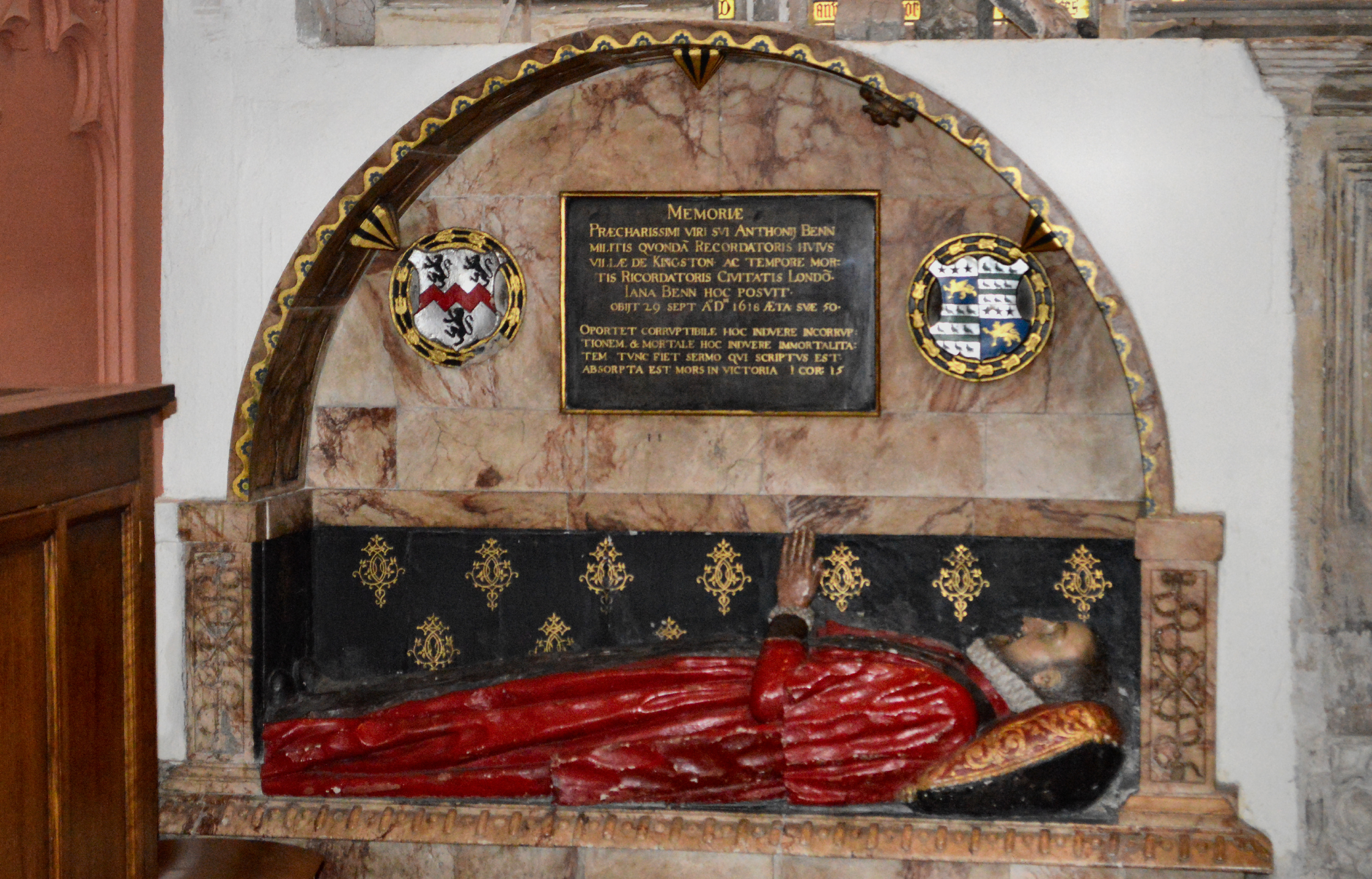
Sir Anthony Benn monument

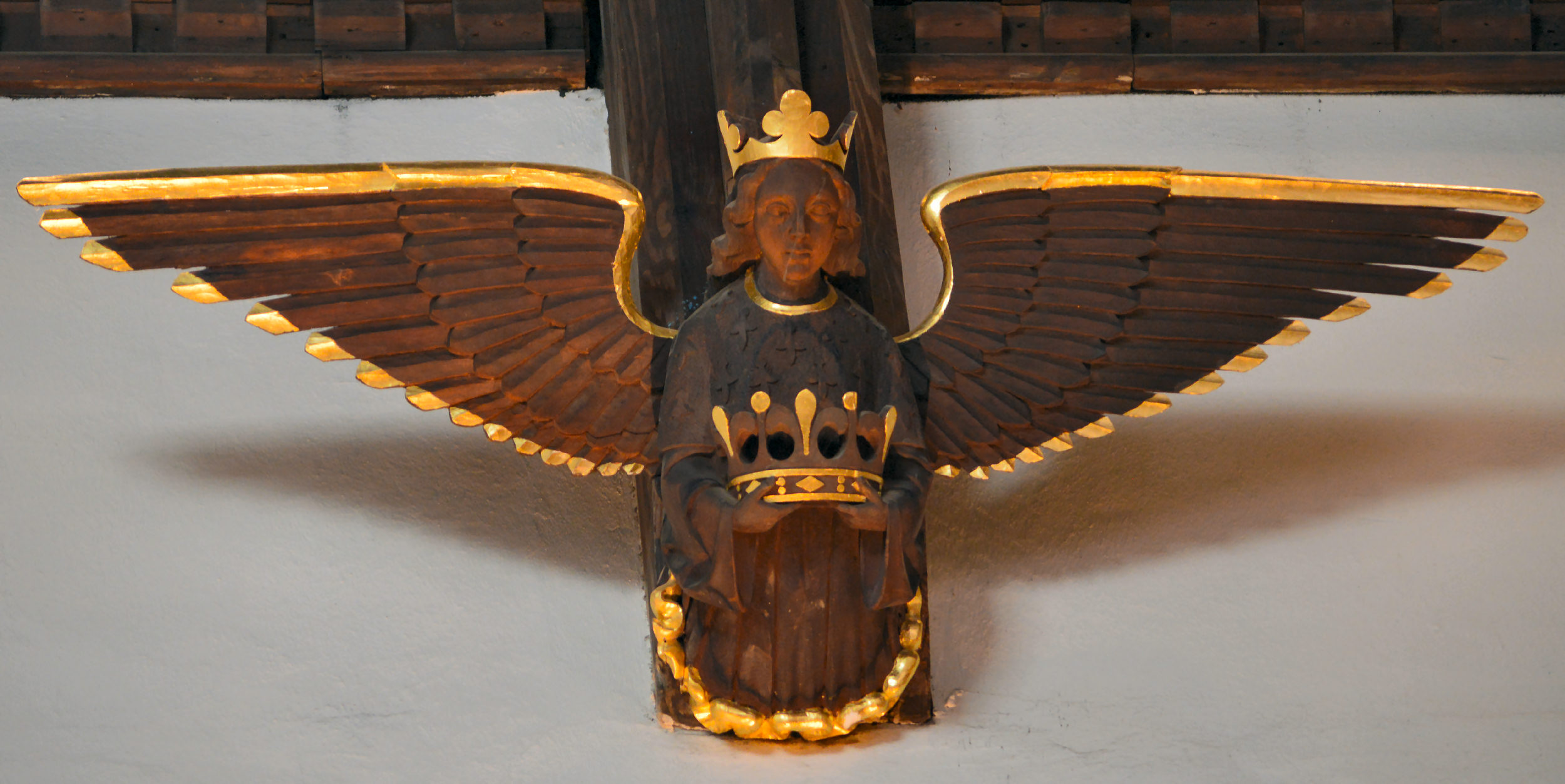
Carved angel

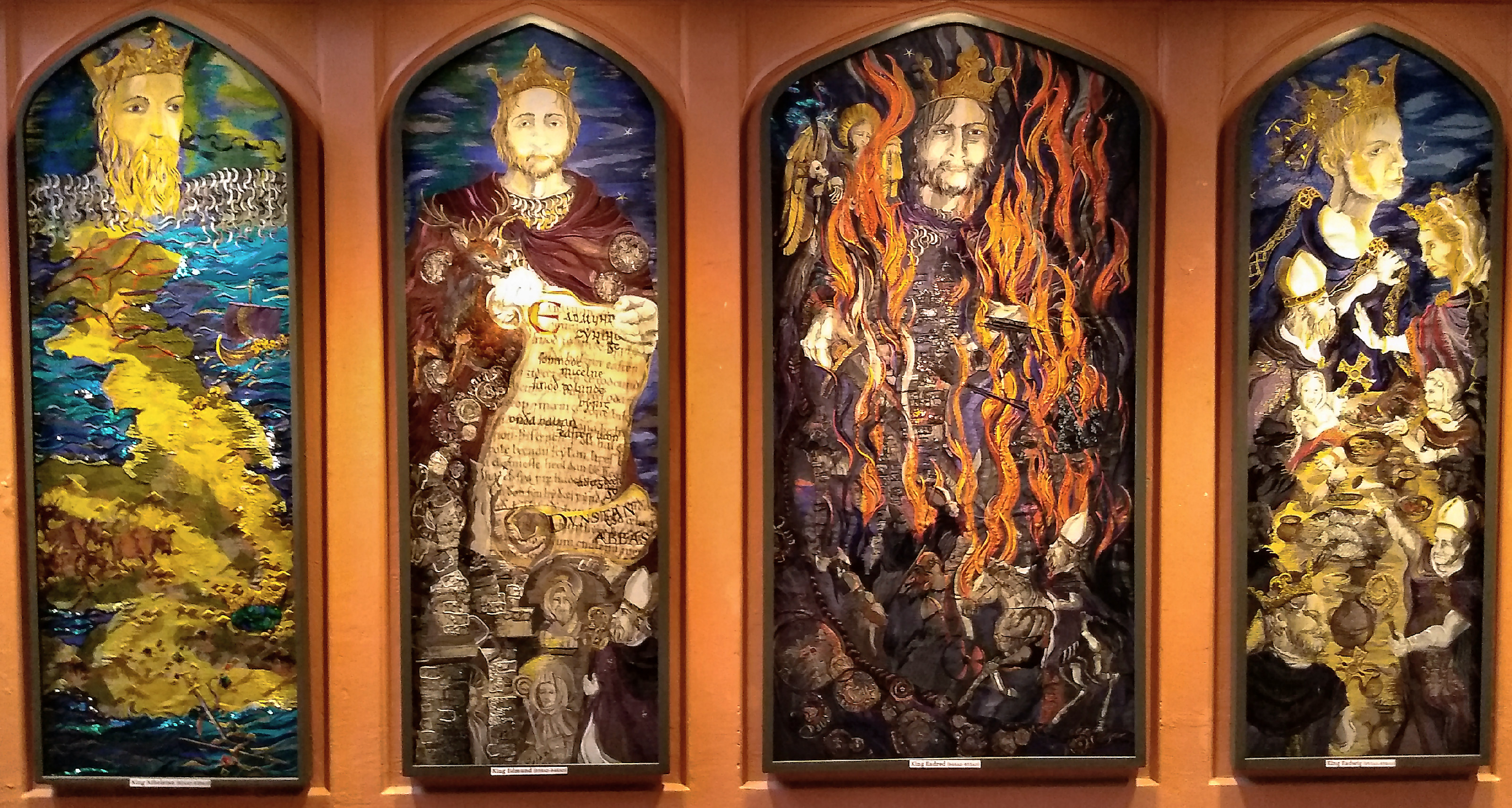
Embroidery panels
