= Listed buildings in Higham, Babergh =

Historic structures in Suffolk, England

Higham is a village and civil parish in the Babergh District of Suffolk, England. It contains 19 listed buildings that are recorded in the National Heritage List for England. Of these one is grade II* and 18 are grade II.

This list is based on the information retrieved online from Historic England.

== Key ==
Grade	Criteria
I	Buildings that are of exceptional interest
II*	Particularly important buildings of more than special interest
II	Buildings that are of special interest

== Listing ==
Name	Grade	Location	Type	Completed (Note: The date given is the date used by Historic England as significant for the initial building or that of an important part in the structure's description.)	Date designated	Grid ref. (Note: The grid reference is based on the British national grid reference system, sometimes known as OSGB36, used by the Ordnance Survey.) Geo-coordinates	Notes	Entry number (Note: The "List Entry Number" is a unique number assigned to each listed building and scheduled monument by Historic England.)	Image	Wikidata
Ketelfield and Attached Garden Terrace and Steps at the South Elevation	II	Hadleigh Road, Colchester, CO7 6LD			23 January 2015	TM0326935996; 51°59′07″N 0°57′32″E		1416968	Upload Photo	Q26676563
Tea Caddy Cottage	II	Hadleigh Road			29 July 1987	TM0333235921; 51°59′04″N 0°57′35″E		1036956	Upload Photo	Q26288631
The Pound	II	Hadleigh Road			22 February 1955	TM0301436877; 51°59′36″N 0°57′20″E		1351624	Upload Photo	Q26634709
Church of St Mary	II*	Higham Road	church building		22 February 1955	TM0356335232; 51°58′42″N 0°57′45″E		1351625	Church of St Mary More images	Q17534539
Higham Hall	II	Higham Road	building		26 January 1967	TM0359735237; 51°58′42″N 0°57′47″E		1036957	Higham Hall More images	Q26288632
The Old Guildhall	II	Higham Road			22 February 1955	TM0346935548; 51°58′52″N 0°57′41″E		1351626	Upload Photo	Q26634710
The Old Vicarage	II	Higham Road			26 January 1967	TM0356335380; 51°58′46″N 0°57′46″E		1036958	Upload Photo	Q26288633
The Old Cottage	II	Lower Street			29 July 1987	TM0320335491; 51°58′51″N 0°57′27″E		1036961	Upload Photo	Q26288638
Tudor House	II	Lower Street			22 February 1955	TM0337835629; 51°58′55″N 0°57′36″E		1036960	Upload Photo	Q26288636
Walnut Tree Cottage	II	Lower Street			11 March 1987	TM0317335471; 51°58′50″N 0°57′25″E		1036962	Upload Photo	Q26288639
White House	II	Lower Street			22 February 1955	TM0341235639; 51°58′55″N 0°57′38″E		1036959	Upload Photo	Q26288634
Old Mill House	II	Marsh Road			29 July 1987	TM0270036598; 51°59′27″N 0°57′03″E		1286299	Upload Photo	Q26574911
Dewlands Farmhouse	II	Sand Pit Lane, Holton St. Mary			29 July 1987	TM0432836726; 51°59′29″N 0°58′29″E		1036963	Upload Photo	Q26288641
Barhams Manor	II	The Green			22 February 1955	TM0348035634; 51°58′55″N 0°57′42″E		1366100	Upload Photo	Q26647731
Byways	II	Upper Street			9 September 1993	TM0351735733; 51°58′58″N 0°57′44″E		1051964	Upload Photo	Q26303780
Higham Lodge	II	Upper Street			22 February 1955	TM0398935931; 51°59′04″N 0°58′09″E		1036966	Upload Photo	Q26288644
Meadow View, Gable End and Adjoining Cottage	II	Upper Street			29 July 1987	TM0355135733; 51°58′58″N 0°57′46″E		1193163	Upload Photo	Q26487822
The Old Post Office	II	Upper Street			26 January 1967	TM0348335650; 51°58′55″N 0°57′42″E		1036964	Upload Photo	Q26288642
White Oak Cottage and Dysart	II	Upper Street			26 January 1967	TM0349235670; 51°58′56″N 0°57′43″E		1036965	Upload Photo	Q26288643

== See also ==
- Grade I listed buildings in Suffolk
- Grade II* listed buildings in Suffolk

== Sources ==
- Bettely, James; Pevsner, Nikolaus (2015) [1961], Suffolk: West, The Buildings of England, New Haven and London: Yale University Press, ISBN 978-0-300-19655-9
