= William Finny =

English physician, mayor and historian (1864–1952)

William Evelyn St Lawrence Finny M.D., M.Ch., B.A.O., J.P., F.S.A. (1864-1952), was a physician, local politician (Mayor of Kingston upon Thames seven times) and historian, author of 'All Saints, Kingston upon Thames (1930)'.

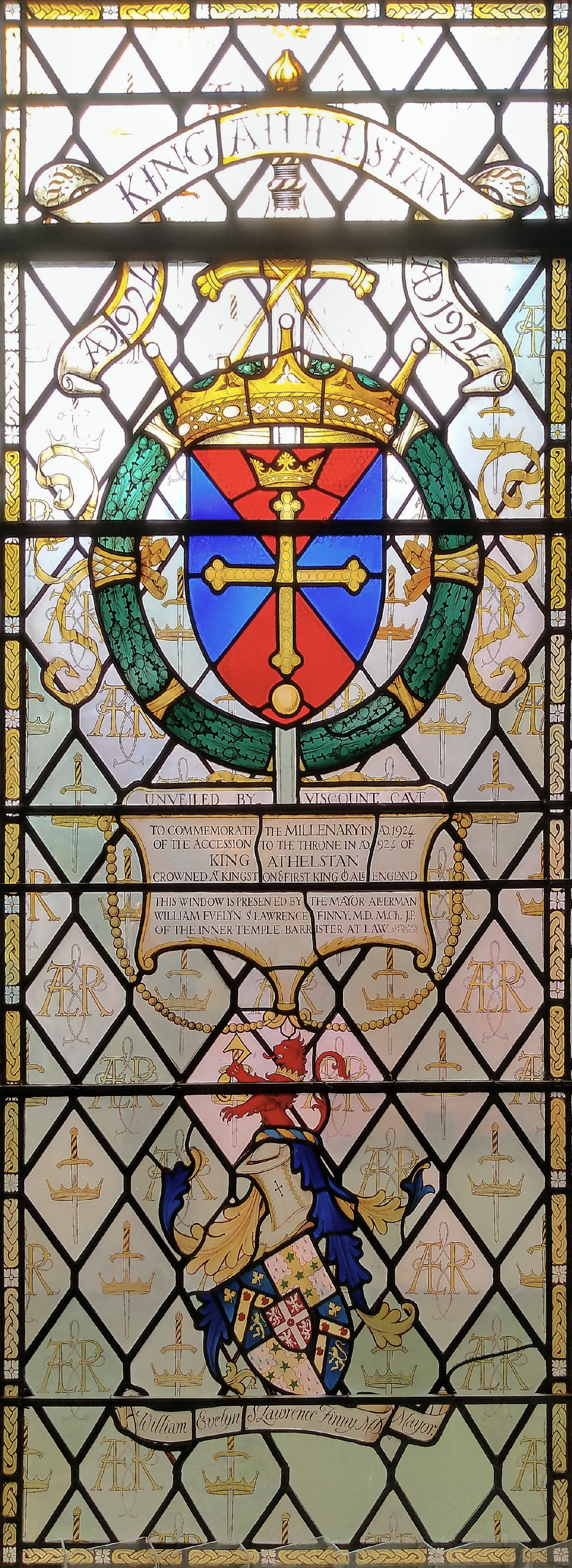
King Athelstan Millenary Memorial window

== Early life ==
He was born in Gotham, Nottinghamshire, 1 September 1864 of Irish ancestry. His father, Henry Maturin Finny, a curate in the Church of England at Gotham, died in 1865 and his mother, Agnes Amelia (née Leslie) returned to Ireland. In 1873 he was elected for the Clergy Orphan School at Canterbury. He was educated at St Columba's College, Dublin, and Trinity College Dublin, graduating in 1887 as M.B. and M.Ch with B.A.O. in 1891. In 1891 he was appointed surgeon and agent by the Admiralty at their sick quarters at Baldoyle, Howth and Sutton.

== Kingston ==
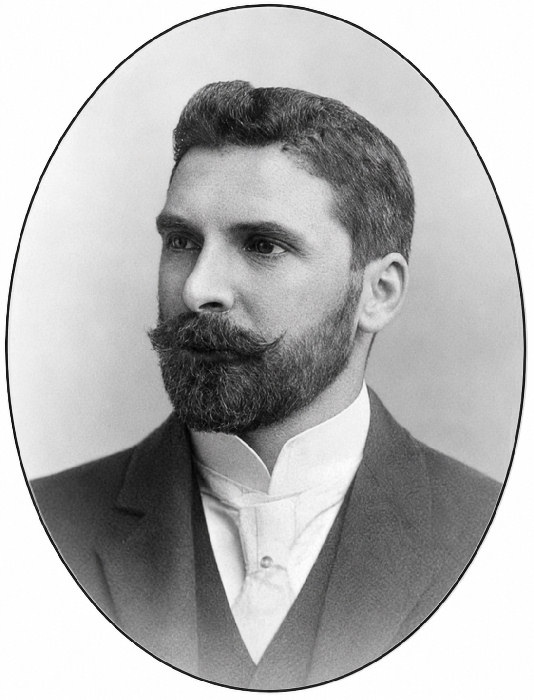
Dr Finny 1898

By 1891 was a GP in Kingston. He was elected a member of the Obstetrical Society of London in 1892. He became a Licentiate of the Royal College of Physicians of Edinburgh in 1897. He was awarded a degree in 1911 by Queen's University Belfast.

William became a Barrister-at-Law and was called to the bar at the Inner Temple but did not practise.

In Kingston, he was a member of the council from 1897, a magistrate from 1905, and Alderman from 1910. He was Mayor of Kingston seven times between 1898 and 1927. He was mayor for the 700th anniversary of the granting of the charter of Incorporation in 1899. He was mayor when the by-pass was opened in 1924; a memorial window was installed in the Town Hall, now the Market House, to commemorate the Millenary of the accession to the throne in A.D. 924 of King Athelstan, now in the museum. He was largely responsible for Kingston being made a "royal borough" by George V in 1927. He also designed the other stained-glass windows formerly in the old Town Hall, including celebrating the 700th anniversary of the first charter, and the confirmation of the Royal Borough. He paid to restore the statue of Queen Anne in the market place.

He was a member of Surrey County Council and also of the Metropolitan Water Board. When he died on 10 October 1952 he was also High Steward of the borough and had been made an honorary Freeman of the Borough of Kingston upon Thames in 1944.

He was elected a Fellow of Society of Antiquaries of London in 1930 and was an authority on the history of Kingston. He had also been master of the Worshipful Company of Tin Plate Workers and Freeman of the City of London.

== Private life ==
He married Rosa Clements in 1898; she died in 1919 and he married Emily Grace Samuel in 1920. He lived at Kingston Hill, at "Tamesa" and "Kenlis", and died at 41, Liverpool Road, Kingston Hill.

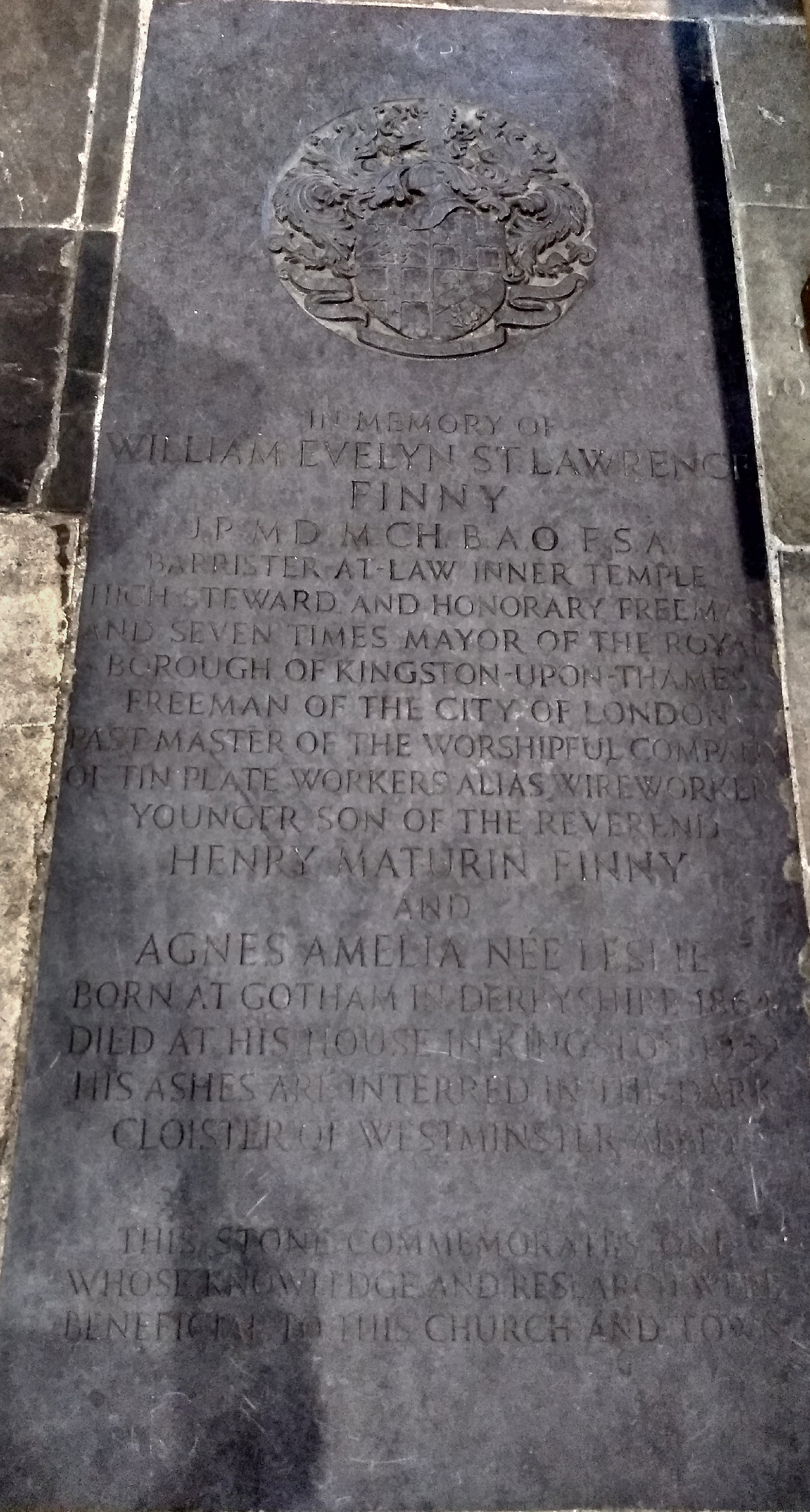
All Saints church, inscription

His ashes were interred at Westminster Abbey in the Dark Cloister in the grave of Thomas Finny (d 1776). There is a memorial inscribed slab in All Saints Church, Kingston upon Thames.

== Books ==
- The Royal Borough of Kingston upon Thames, Ancient and Modern, with Notes Upon Surbiton and Its Surroundings (1902)
- Finny's First Aid: A Note-book for Ambulance Students (1914)
- A Lecture on the Life of King Athelstan who was Crowned at Kingston (1924)
- All Saints, Kingston upon Thames (1930)
- The Church of the Saxon Coronation at Kingston (1941)
