= Charles Regnart =

English sculptor

Charles Regnart (1759 – 19 November 1844) was an English sculptor, specialising in funerary monuments. His masterpiece is said to be the 17th-century-style recumbent figure of George Rush in the parish church in Farthinghoe. The figure shows Rush in old age, lying with his slippers on, clutching a Bible and staring at heaven. Regnart flourished from 1790 until 1830. His style has been described as "pseudo-Classical" and is typified by much folded drapery and an overall pattern of white (usually a draped funerary urn or casket) against a black background.

== Life ==
He was born in Bristol, the son of Philip Regnart (1739–1805), a carver and statue maker from Flanders who had worked under Thomas Ricketts of Gloucester, and who claimed descent from the Gothic chief Raginhart who sacked Rome with Alaric.

Regnart married Esther Hunter of Hexham at Little Mary-la-Bonne Church in London, with whom he had one son, Charles, born in 1796. They lived at 12 Cleveland Street, off Cavendish Square in London. Following Esther's death, he married Jane, the family cook. They moved to a new house at Hampstead Road near Euston around 1817. He exhibited several works at the Royal Academy.

He died on 19 November 1844 at St Mary's Buildings, St Martin-in-the-Fields, London, and was buried in Hampstead Road Cemetery in London.

== Notable monuments ==
- Both Lucy Davidson and William Dunbar were at All Saints Church, Kingston upon Thames
- John Beyton at Carshalton
- George Medley at Buxted
- Jane Rashleigh at Tywardreath (1795)
- William Vachell at Hinxton (1795)
- Thomas Somers Cocks at Eastnor (1796) (grandfather of Thomas Somers-Cocks)
- Henry Davidson (the elder), All Saints Church, Kingston upon Thames (1799)
- Michael Biddulph, Ledbury (1800)
- Elizabeth St Aubyn, Orsett (1801)
- Thomas Astle, Battersea Parish Church (1803)
- Anthony Atcheson, Portsmouth Cathedral (1804)
- Memorial to John André (executed as a British spy in 1780), in the Grosvenor Chapel, London (1804)
- Admiral White at Cookham (1810)
- Lt Henry Sedgewick at Hackney Parish Church (1811)
- Robert Hoy (d.1811) in Higham in Suffolk
- Sir John Kemp, Gissing (1815)
- Jeremiah Tarleton at the Church of Our Lady and Saint Nicholas, Liverpool (destroyed by German bombing in December 1940)
- Hugh James, Carlisle Cathedral (1817)
- David Milligan, Jamaica Cathedral (1818)
- Sir Jonathan Miles, Ealing Parish Church (1821)
- Anne Margaret Brymer (d.1840), Port Antonio, Jamaica (1842)
