= Lavers, Barraud and Westlake =

19th-century stained glass manufacturers

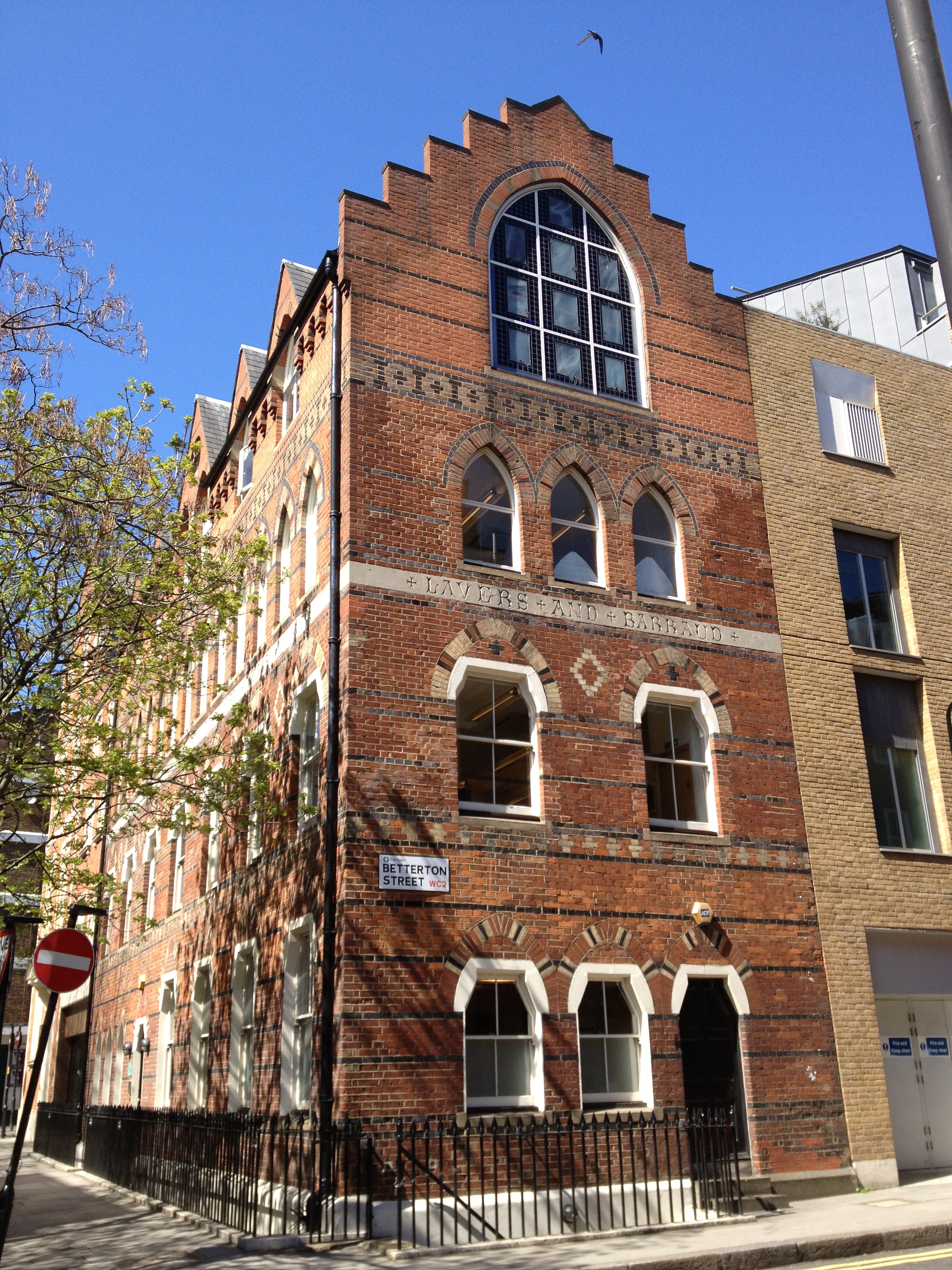
The Grade II listed former premises of Lavers and Barraud in Endell Street, Covent Garden, London

Lavers, Barraud and Westlake were an English firm that produced stained glass windows from 1855 until 1921. They were part of the 19th-century Gothic Revival movement that had a significant influence on English civic, ecclesiastical and domestic architecture, and on the manufacture and use of stained glass as decoration and as glazing.

== History ==
In the mid-19th century, Lavers, Barraud and Westlake were among many young designers who responded to the growing market for stained glass windows. The partnership initially comprised Nathaniel Wood Lavers (1828–1911) and Francis Philip Barraud (1824–1900). (Note: Younger brother of William Barraud and Charles Decimus Barraud, descendants of a French Huguenot family of watch and clockmakers) Both were originally employed at the workshops of James Powell and Sons. Lavers started his own studio in 1855 and was joined by Barraud in 1858, from which date they operated as Lavers & Barraud. Nathaniel Westlake (1833–1921), a freelance artist, was engaged by the pair as a designer, having worked with the architect William Burges, and with Alfred Bell (1832–1895), of notable glaziers and designers Clayton and Bell.

The company employed the services of a number of freelance artists apart from Westlake, who joined them as a partner in 1868. These included Henry Stacy Marks (1829–1898), who designed windows with elongated figures in the medieval style for the company in its earliest years, and J.M. Allen, who worked with Lavers and Barraud before the joining of Westlake, also designing windows for the firms of Heaton, Butler and Bayne, and Shrigley and Hunt until the 1880s. Alfred Bell and Henry Holiday also designed glass for Lavers, Barraud and Westlake.

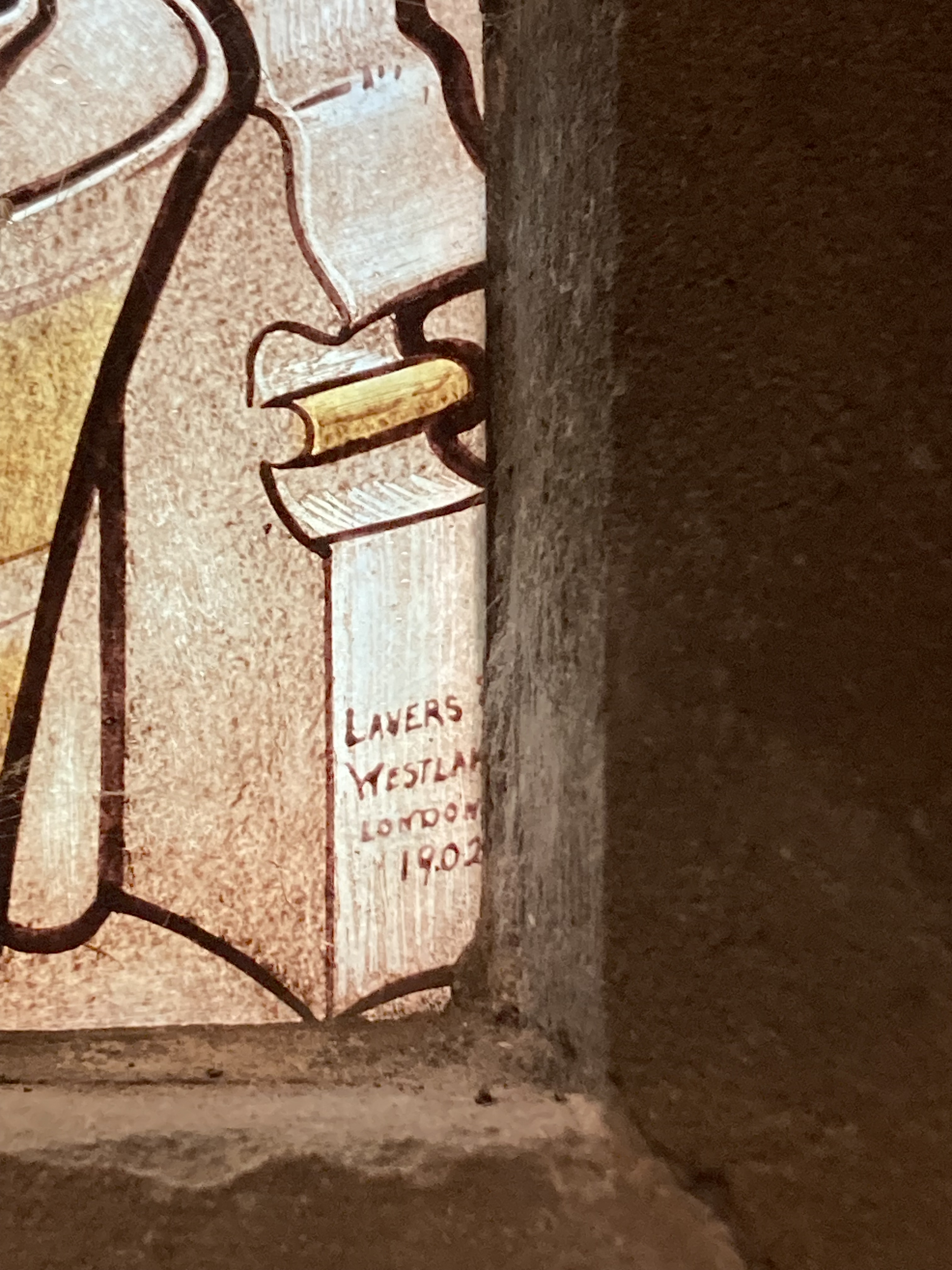
Lavers and Westlake signature from a window in Christ Church, Reading

Between 1891 and 1894, Nathaniel Westlake published four volumes titled A History of Design in Painted Glass. After the deaths of Barraud in 1900, and of Lavers in 1911, Westlake became the sole partner, continuing in business until his death in 1921.

== Selected works ==
- St. Peter's Church, Cringleford, Norfolk
- Christ Church, Reading

== See also ==
- British and Irish stained glass (1811–1918)
