= Higham, Babergh =

Village in Suffolk, England

Coordinates: 51.98252°N 0.96172°E

Higham
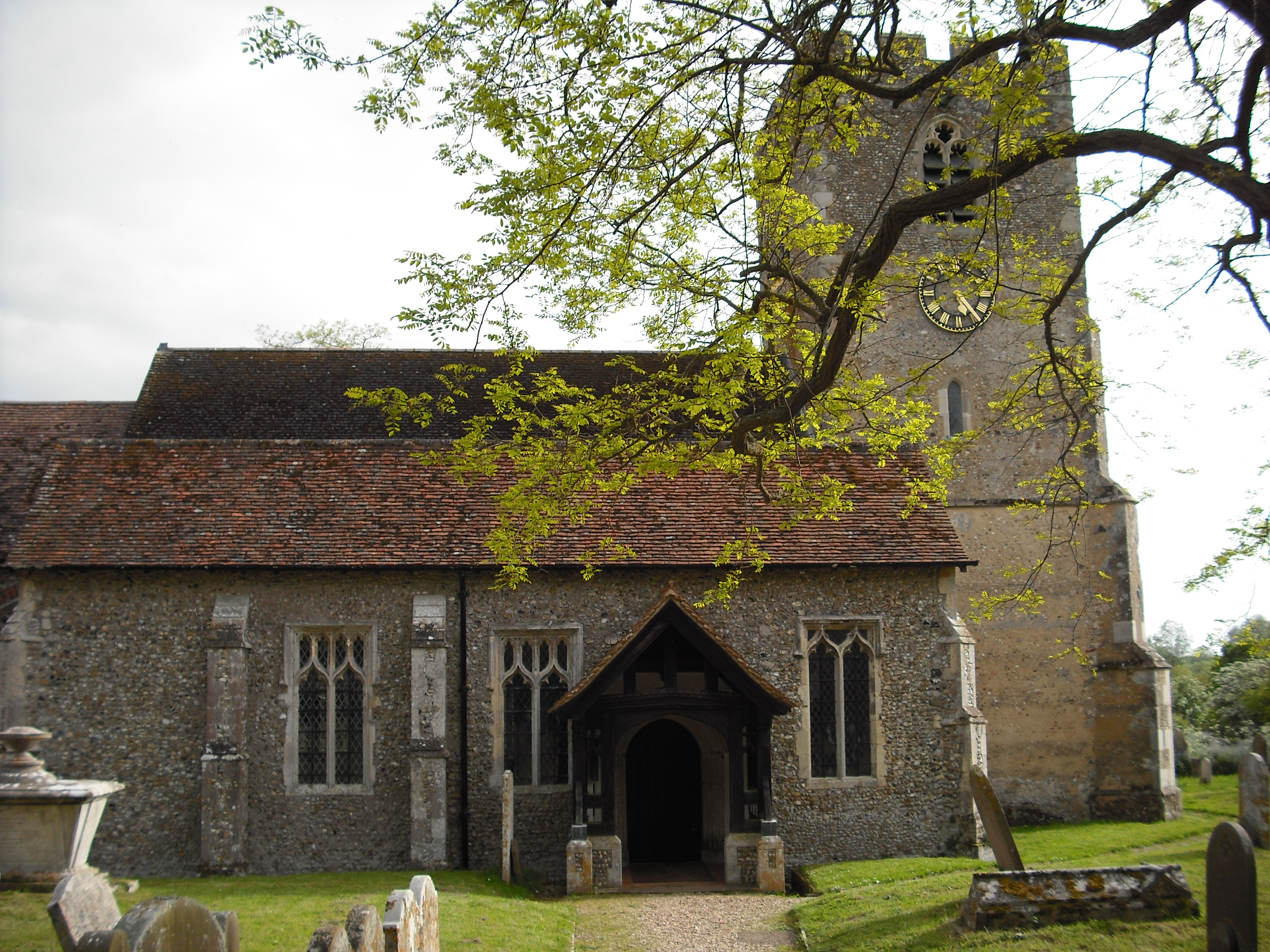
- St Mary's Church

- Location within Suffolk
- Population: 203 (2011 Census)
- OS grid reference: TM034357
- District: Babergh
- Shire county: Suffolk
- Region: East
- Country: England
- Sovereign state: United Kingdom
- Post town: COLCHESTER
- Postcode district: CO7
- Dialling code: 01206
- Police: Suffolk
- Fire: Suffolk
- Ambulance: East of England
- UK Parliament: South Suffolk

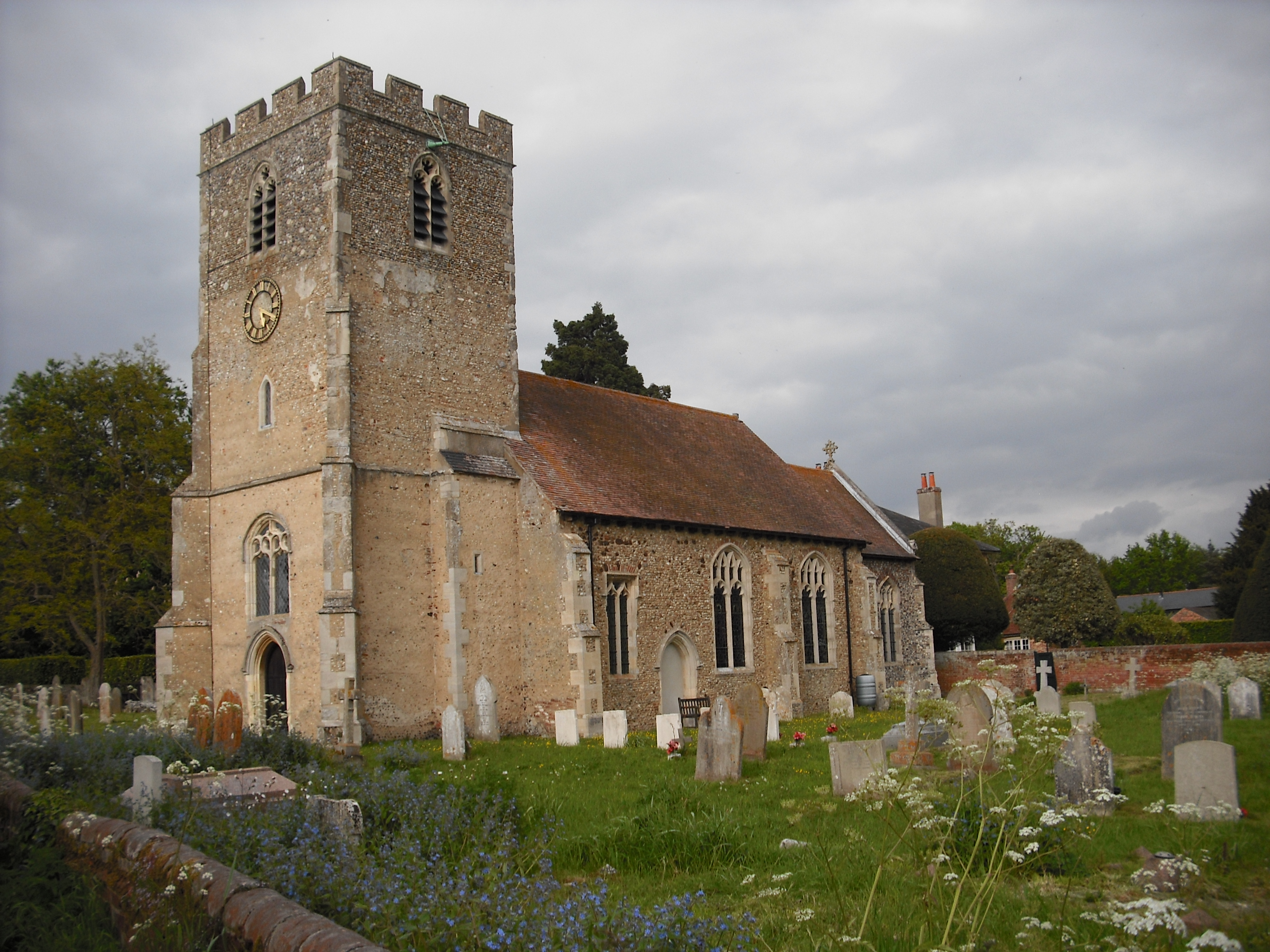
St Mary's Church, from the south-west

Higham is a village and civil parish in Suffolk, England. Located on the eastern bank of the River Brett (which defines the parish's western boundary), around 400 metres (440 yd) north of the point at which it joins the River Stour, it is part of Babergh district. In 2005 it had a population of 140, including Shelley and increasing to 203 at the census 2011.

The village itself is a designated conservation area, whilst the entire parish is located within the Dedham Vale Area of Outstanding Natural Beauty. It also contains Rowley Grove, a nature reserve classed as Ancient Woodland and a point to point racecourse which is home to the Waveney Harriers.

== St Mary's Church ==
A church stood in Higham at the time of the Domesday Book and parts of the original church are incorporated into the current building, which is primarily 14th to 15th-century. The north aisle was added in 1410. It is believed to be by a local stonemason from Occold, called Hawes, who also worked at the churches in Bildeston, Debenham and Otley.

The interior has a Perpendicular font, stoup and piscina, all Medieval. The benches are Victorian copies of medieval originals, although incorporating some earlier work. The wooden chancel arch and stalls are also Victorian. The oldest memorial, likely of John Mannock of Giffords Hall in Shimpling who died in 1476, was found during a restoration in 2005. The timber roof beams have carved wooden corbels with various facial expressions. The monument to Robert Hoy (d.1811) is by the London sculptor, Charles Regnart.

== Higham Hall ==
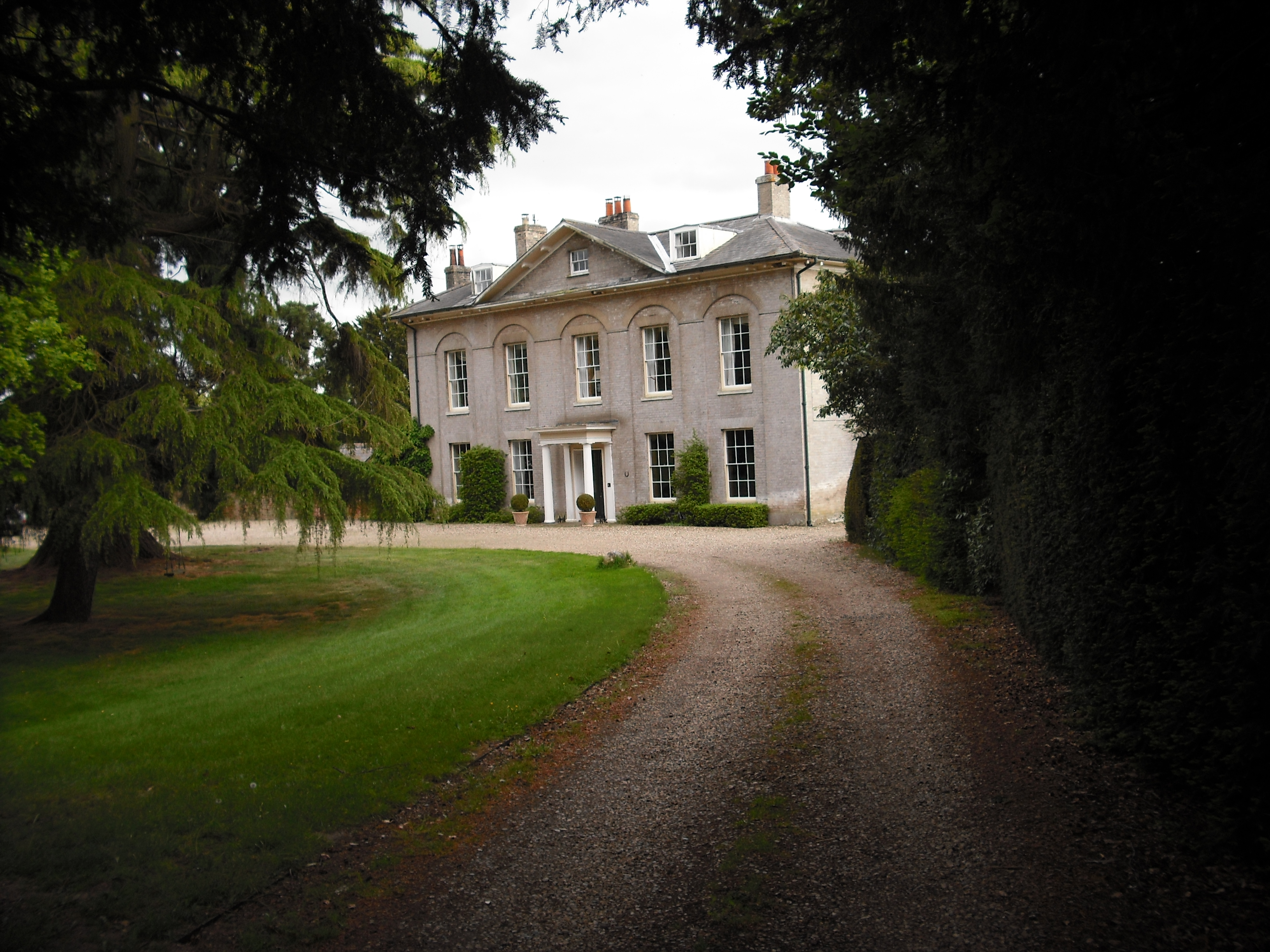
Higham Hall

Higham Hall is a Grade II listed building situated next to St Mary's Church. It dates from the early 19th century. The frontage is constructed in white bricks, while the rear is of red brick in English bond. The roof is of slate. The house has two storeys and an attic, with a five bay façade. The porch has Doric columns. The garden has a notable giant redwood tree/

== Cedric Morris ==
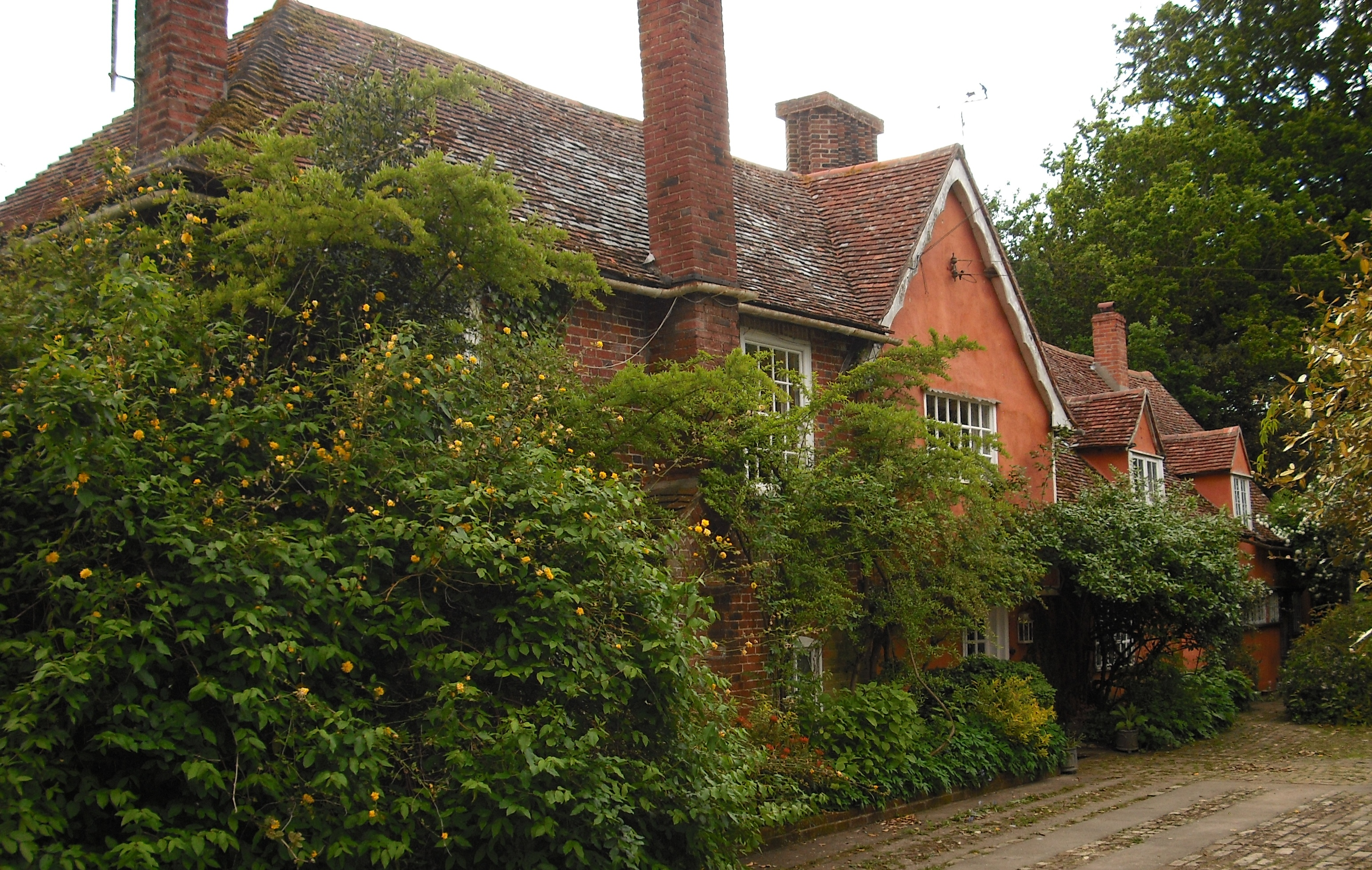
Pound Farm - rear

Early in 1929 the artist Cedric Morris and his partner rented Pound Farm in the village, which he subsequently inherited. Many artistic friends visited, including Frances Hodgkins, Barbara Hepworth and John Skeaping and Pound became known for the gardens he developed and the parties he gave.
