= Christ Church, Reading =

Christ Church
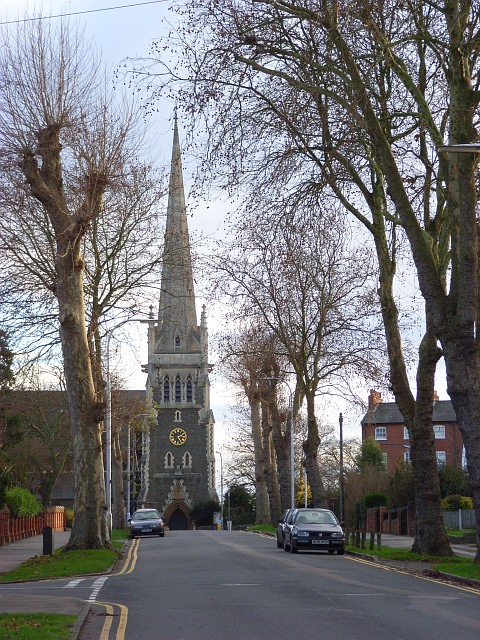
- Christ Church, viewed from Kendrick Road

- Location within Reading
- 51°26′38.400″N 0°57′44.474″W
- Location: Reading
- Country: England
- Denomination: Church of England

History
- Consecrated: 7 August 1862

Architecture
- Functional status: Active
- Heritage designation: Grade II*
- Style: High Victorian

Administration
- Diocese: Oxford
- Archdeaconry: Berkshire

Christ Church is a Church of England parish church situated to the south of the centre of the town of Reading in the English county of Berkshire. The church is located at the junction of Christchurch Road and Kendrick Road, and its tower and spire terminate the vista looking up the latter road. It is a good example of the High Victorian style and is a Grade II* listed building.

The church was built in 1861-2 by the architect Henry Woodyer, and consecrated on 7 August 1862. Originally planned as a chapel of ease for St Giles' Church, it was enlarged in 1874 with the addition of the tower, spire, south aisle and vestries.

== External references ==
- Church web site
