= British and Irish stained glass (1811–1918) =

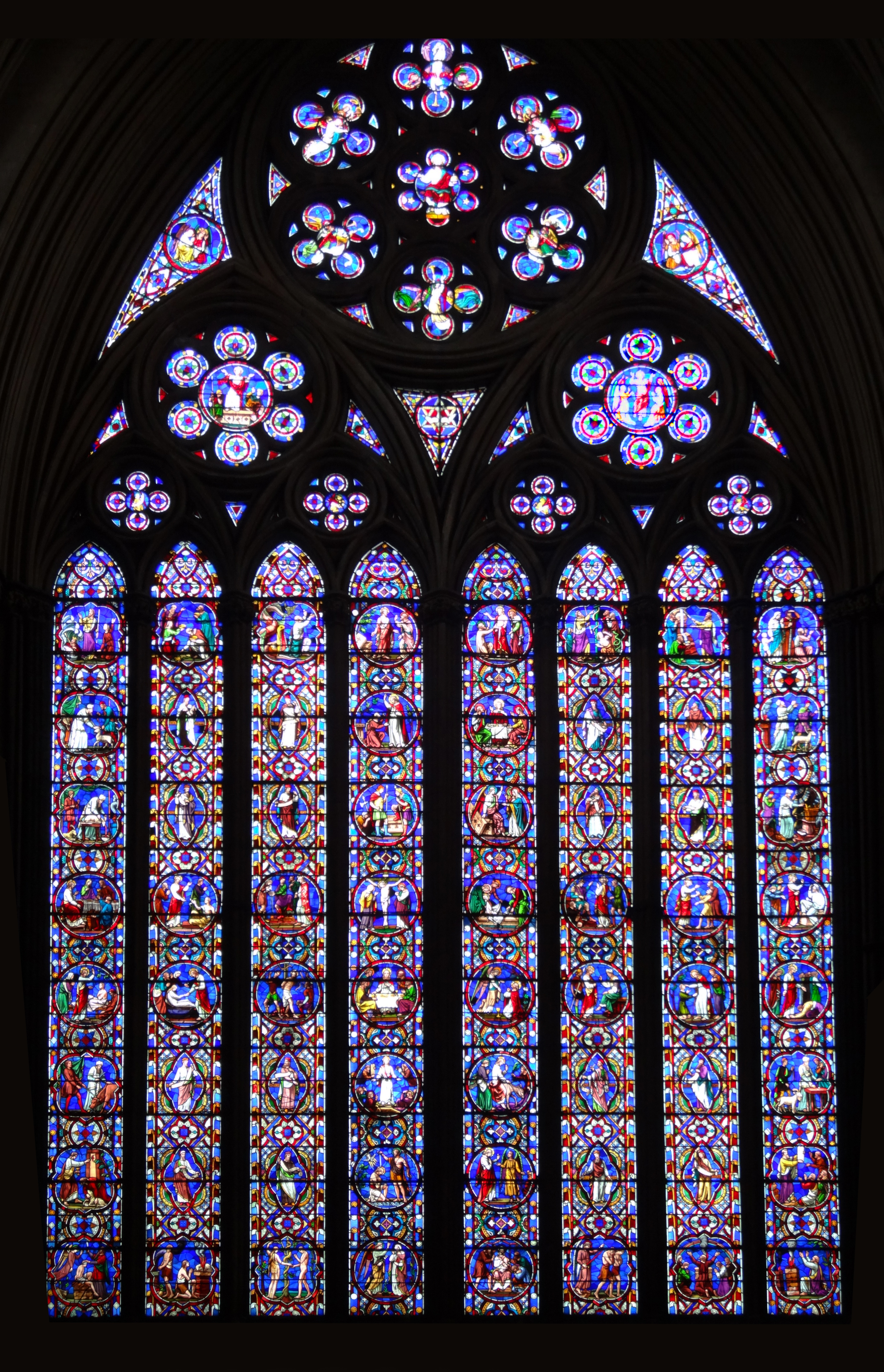
One of the most prestigious stained glass commissions of the 19th century, the re-glazing of the 13th-century east window of Lincoln Cathedral, Ward and Nixon, 1855.

A revival of the art and craft of stained-glass window manufacture took place in early 19th-century Britain, beginning with an armorial window created by Thomas Willement in 1811–12. The revival led to stained-glass windows becoming such a common and popular form of coloured pictorial representation that many thousands of people, most of whom would never commission or purchase a painting, contributed to the commission and purchase of stained-glass windows for their parish church.

Within 50 years of the beginnings of commercial manufacture in the 1830s, British stained glass grew into an enormous and specialised industry, with important centres in Newcastle upon Tyne, Birmingham, Whitechapel in London, Edinburgh, Glasgow, Liverpool, Norwich and Dublin. The industry also flourished in the United States, Canada, Australia and New Zealand. By 1900 British windows had been installed in Copenhagen, Venice, Athens, Bangalore, Nagasaki, Manila and Wellington. After the Great War from 1914 to 1918, stained glass design was to change radically.

== Background ==
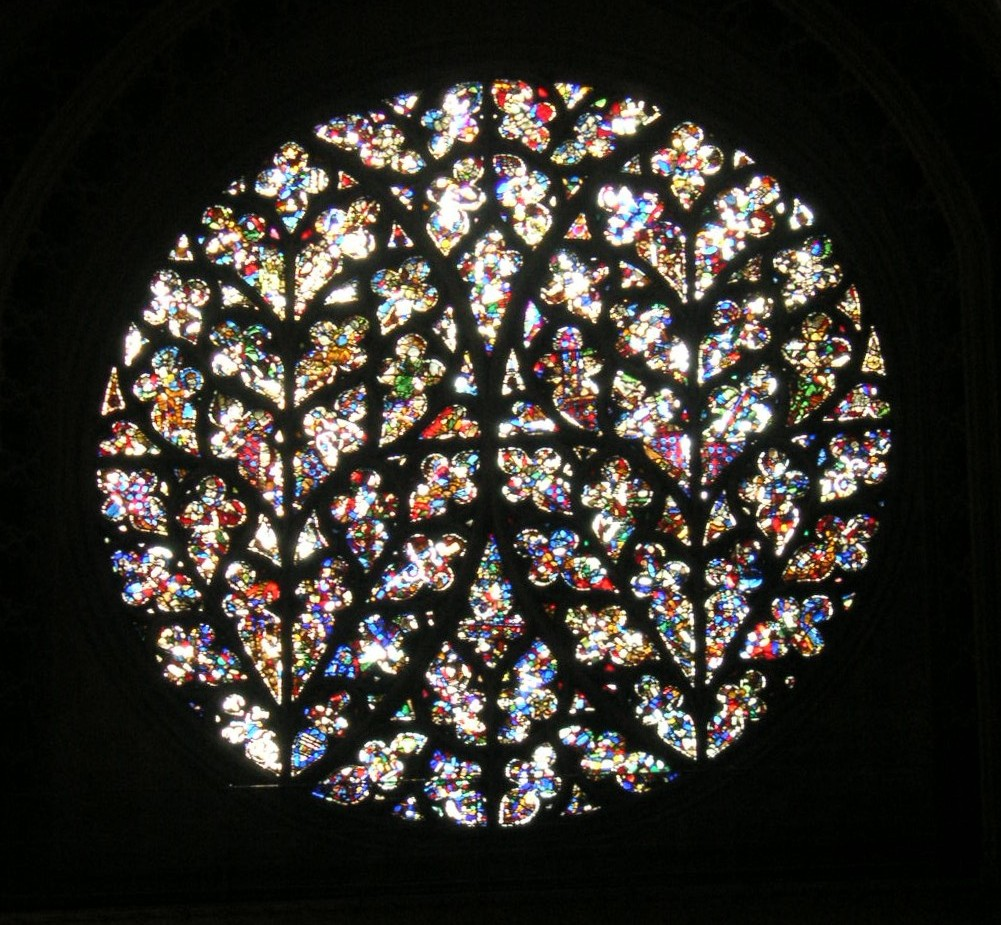
The Bishop's Eye, (1320) at Lincoln Cathedral, is filled with salvaged fragments.

Following the Norman Conquest of England in 1066, many churches, abbeys and cathedrals were built, initially in the Norman or Romanesque style, then in the increasingly elaborate and decorative Gothic style. In these churches the windows were generally either large or in multiples so that the light within the building was maximised. The windows were glazed, frequently with coloured glass held in place by strips of lead. Because flat glass could only be manufactured in small pieces, the method of glazing lent itself to patterning. The pictorial representation of biblical characters and narratives was a feature of Christian churches, often taking the form of murals. By the 12th century stained glass was well adapted to serve this purpose. For 500 years the art flourished and adapted to changing architectural styles.

The vast majority of English glass was smashed by Puritans under Oliver Cromwell. Churches which retain a substantial amount of early glass are rare. Very few of England's large windows are intact. Those that contain a large amount of Medieval glass are usually reconstructed from salvaged fragments. The east, west and south transept windows of York Minster and the west and north Transept windows of Canterbury give an idea of the splendours that have been mostly lost.

In Scotland, which never manufactured its own stained glass but bought from the south, they lost much of their glass not because it was smashed but because the monasteries were disbanded. These monasteries had monks with skills in repairing. When they went, windows gradually fell apart.

== Influences on the revival of stained glass ==
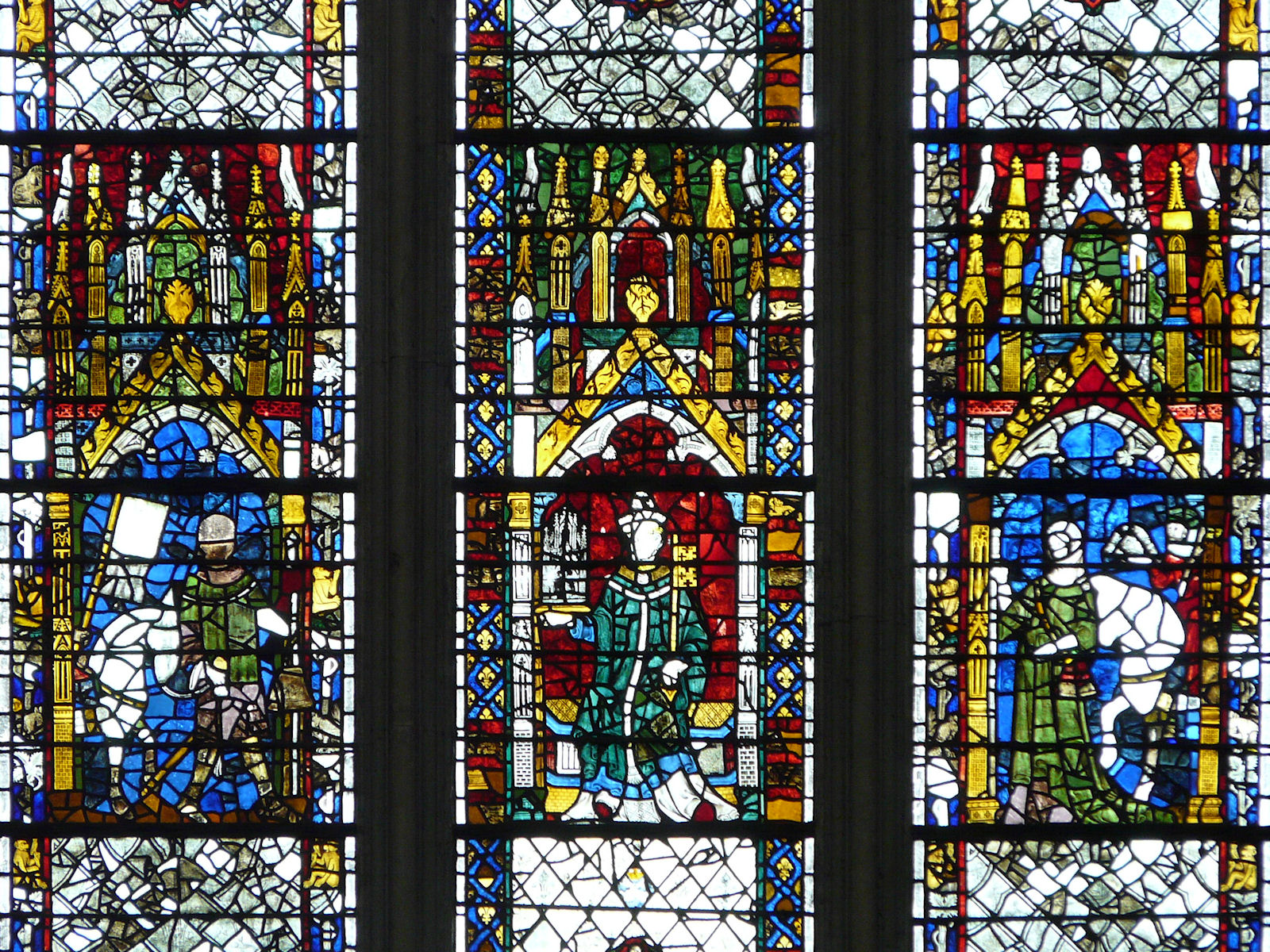
The 14th-century glass of west window of York Minster has figures set beneath brightly coloured canopies, adopted by 19th-century designers such as Clayton and Bell

=== Historic ===
Medieval windows and drawings of them provided the source and inspiration for nearly all the earlier 19th-century designers.

Canterbury Cathedral retains more ancient glass than any other English cathedral except York. Much of it appears to be imported from France and some is very early, dating from the 11th century. Much of the glass is in the style of Chartres Cathedral with deep blue featuring as the background colour in most windows. There are wide borders of stylised floral motifs and small pictorial panels of round, square or diaper shape. Other windows contain rows of apostles, saints and prophets. These windows, including the large west window have a predominance of red, pink, brown and green in the colours, with smaller areas of blue. Most of the glass in this remarkable window is older than the 15th-century stone tracery that contains it, the figure of Adam being part of a series of Ancestors of Christ that are among the oldest surviving panels in England.

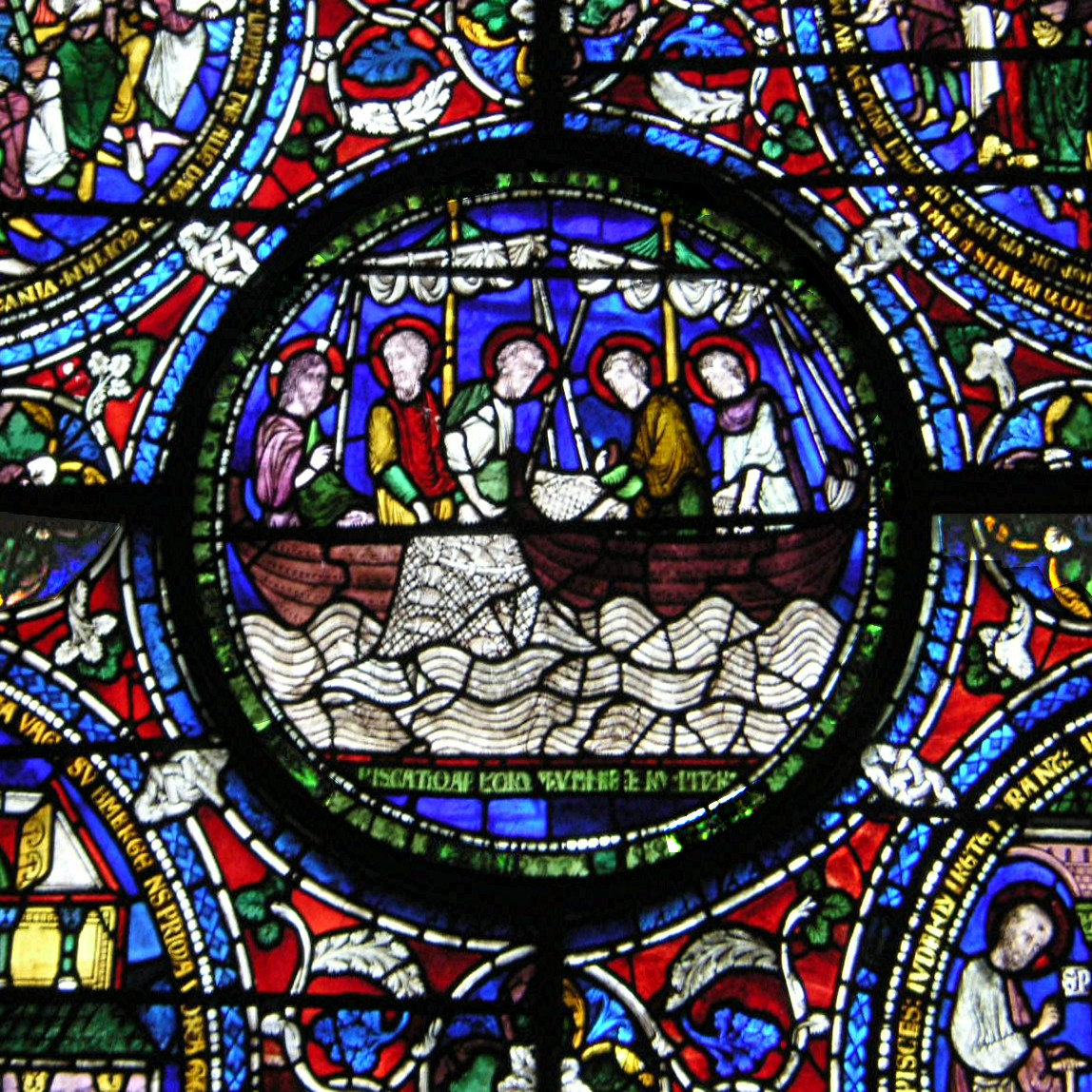
13th-century glass at Canterbury Cathedral is full of lively narratives set in roundels surrounded by foliate scrolls, adopted by many 19th-century designers including Clutterbuck, William Wailes and Ward and Hughes

York Minster also contains much of its original glass including important narrative windows of the Norman period, the famous Five Sisters window, the 14th-century west window and 15th-century east window. The "Five Sisters", although repaired countless times so that they now contain a spider's web of lead, still reveal their delicate pattern of simple geometric shapes enhanced by grisaille painting. They were the style of window which was most easily imitated by early 19th-century plumber-glaziers. The east and west windows of York are outstanding examples because in each case they are huge, intact, at their original location and by a known craftsman. The west window, designed in about 1340 by Master Robert, contains tiers of saints and stories of Christ and the Virgin Mary, each surmounted by a delicate Gothic canopy in white and yellow-stain, against a red background. The highly ornate tracery lights are filled with floral motifs. White glass stone borders surround each panel, making it appear to float in its frame. The east window of 1405 was glazed by John Thornton and is the largest intact medieval window in the world. It presents a narrative in sequential panels of the Creation, the Fall of Man, the Redemption, the Apocalypse, the Last Judgment and the Glory of God.

York also has windows with small diaper-shaped quarries painted with little birds and other motifs which were much reproduced in the 19th century.

Between them, the windows of York and Canterbury cathedrals provided the examples for different styles of windows—geometric patterns, floral motifs and borders, narratives set in small panels, rows of figures, major thematic schemes.

Scattered all over England, sometimes in remote churches, is similar evidence of the designs, motifs and techniques used in the past. Two churches, St Neot's in Cornwall and Fairford in Gloucestershire, are of particular interest. Fairford escaped the depredations of the Puritan era and, uniquely in England, retained its complete medieval cycle of glass. The theme is that of the east window of York, the Salvation of Mankind, but in this case the theme is spread across all the windows of the church, large and small. The west window, of seven lights, shows a single narrative incident, the Last Judgment. This scheme and these particular windows provided a rare source for the designers of narrative windows for parish churches.

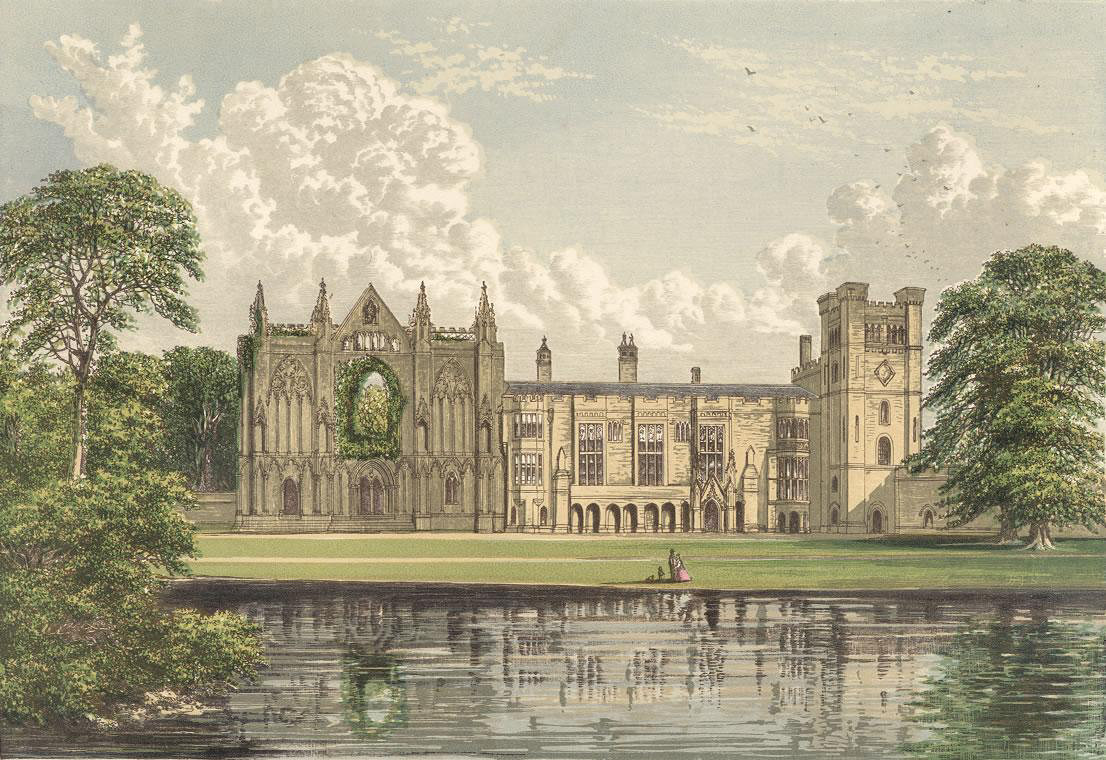
Newstead Abbey as it was in the late 19th century

=== Philosophic ===
==== Romanticism ====
In the 18th century there was a growing trend for philosophers, writers and painters to commune with nature. Nature was seen as all the more attractive if it contained signs of the grand aspirations, ideals and follies of humankind. Few things were considered more romantic than a medieval ruin which conjured up images of the traditional "romances" or idealistic sagas of the Middle Ages.

England contained a great number of large Medieval ruins. These were chiefly castles destroyed by the Civil War in the 17th century and, even more significantly, vast abbey churches ruined at the Dissolution of the Monasteries in the 16th century. These ruined abbey churches suffered three long-term fates. Some were used as quarries for their building materials. The more remote abbeys were simply left to slowly decay. Those that were conveniently placed were awarded, with their associated lands, to favourites of King Henry VIII and his heirs. Thus it was that many of England's nobility grew up in homes that included within their structure part the Gothic remains of an ancient church or its associated monastic buildings. Some of these houses, such as the poet Byron's home, Newstead Abbey, contain reference to their origin within their name.

In the 18th century the owning of such a pile became fashionable. Those of noble lineage who did not have a ruin or a battlemented tower or an interior with pointed arcades promptly built one. Among the earliest of these creations was the novelist Horace Walpole's refurbishing of his London villa, which gave its name to the pretty and somewhat superficial style of architectural decoration known as Strawberry Hill Gothick. The movement gained impetus- Sir Walter Scott built himself a Scottish Baronial mansion, Abbotsford; the castles of Warwick, Arundel and Windsor were refurbished by their owners. The movement was just as strong in Germany where "Mad" King Ludwig II of Bavaria indulged his medievalism with the construction of Neuschwanstein Castle. All over Europe, those who could afford to do so began the restoration and refurbishment of Medieval buildings. The last great Romantic flourish was the building of Castle Drogo by Sir Edwin Lutyens between 1910 and 1930.

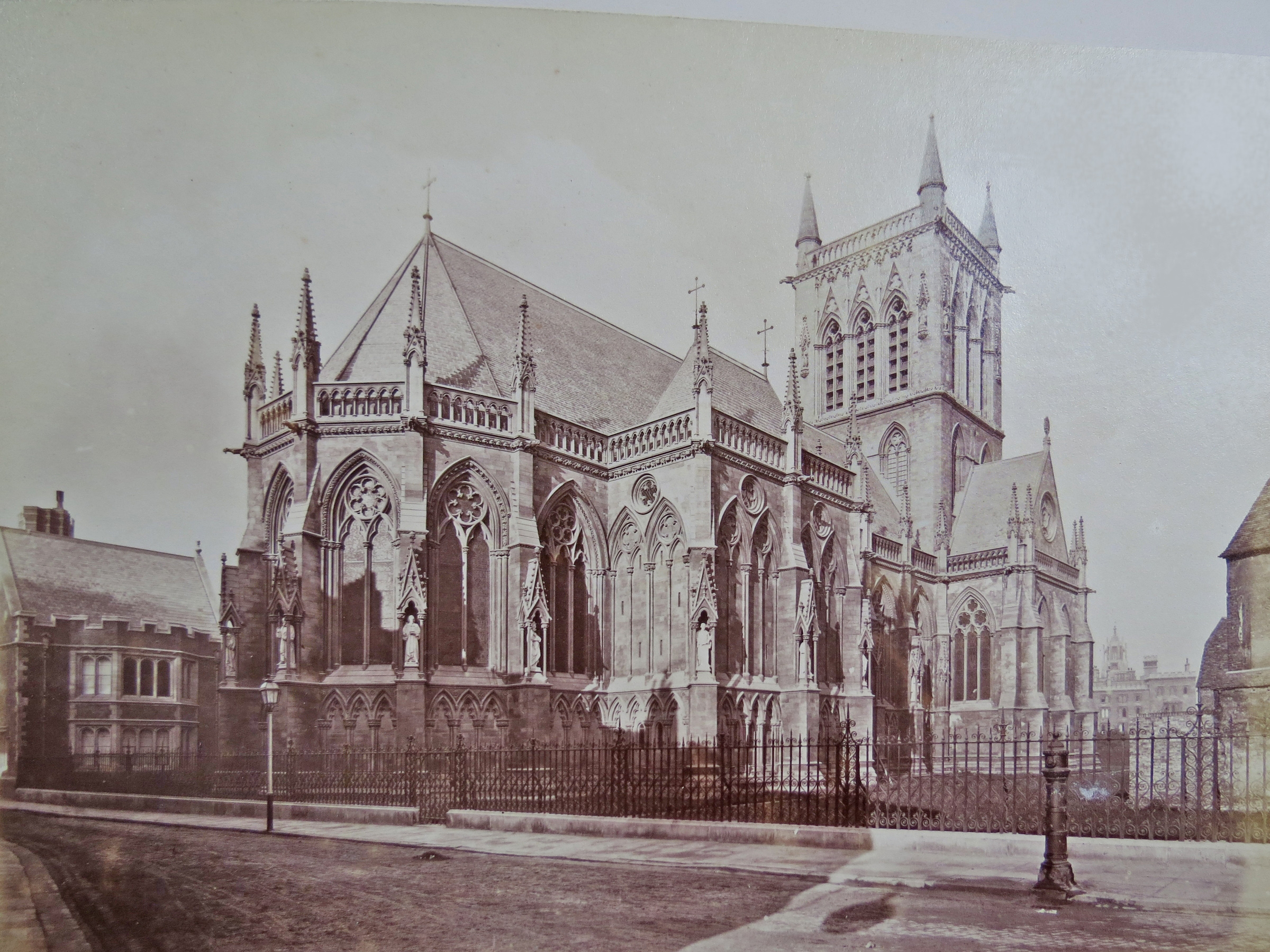
St John's College Chapel, Cambridge, by George Gilbert Scott, photograph 1870

==== The Oxford Movement ====
Begun in Oxford in 1833 by the theologian John Keble and supported by John Henry Newman, the Oxford Movement stressed the universality or "catholic" nature of the Christian Church and urged priests of the Church of England to reconsider their pre-Reformation traditions in both Doctrine and Liturgy. While reinforcing the concept of direct descent from the Apostles through the Church of Rome, the movement did not advocate a return to Roman Catholicism. In practice, however, several hundred Anglican priests, including Newman, became Roman Catholic. The long-term effects of the Oxford Movement were the rapid expansion of the Roman Catholic Church in Britain and the establishment of Anglo-Catholic liturgical styles in many Anglican churches. The emphasis on liturgical rites brought about an artistic revolution in church building and decoration.

==== The Cambridge Camden Society ====
Formed in 1839 as a society of Cambridge undergraduates with an interest in Medieval architecture, this group developed into a powerful movement for the recording, study preservation of England's ancient churches, the analysis and definition of architectural style and the dissemination of such information through its publications, chiefly a monthly journal The Ecclesiologist (1841–1869). The Cambridge Camden Society did much to bring about a revival of medieval styles in the design and appointments of 19th-century churches, as well as in the restoration of older ones. Their notions were often highly prescriptive, inflexible and intolerant of diversity within the church. They were insistent upon revival rather than originality.

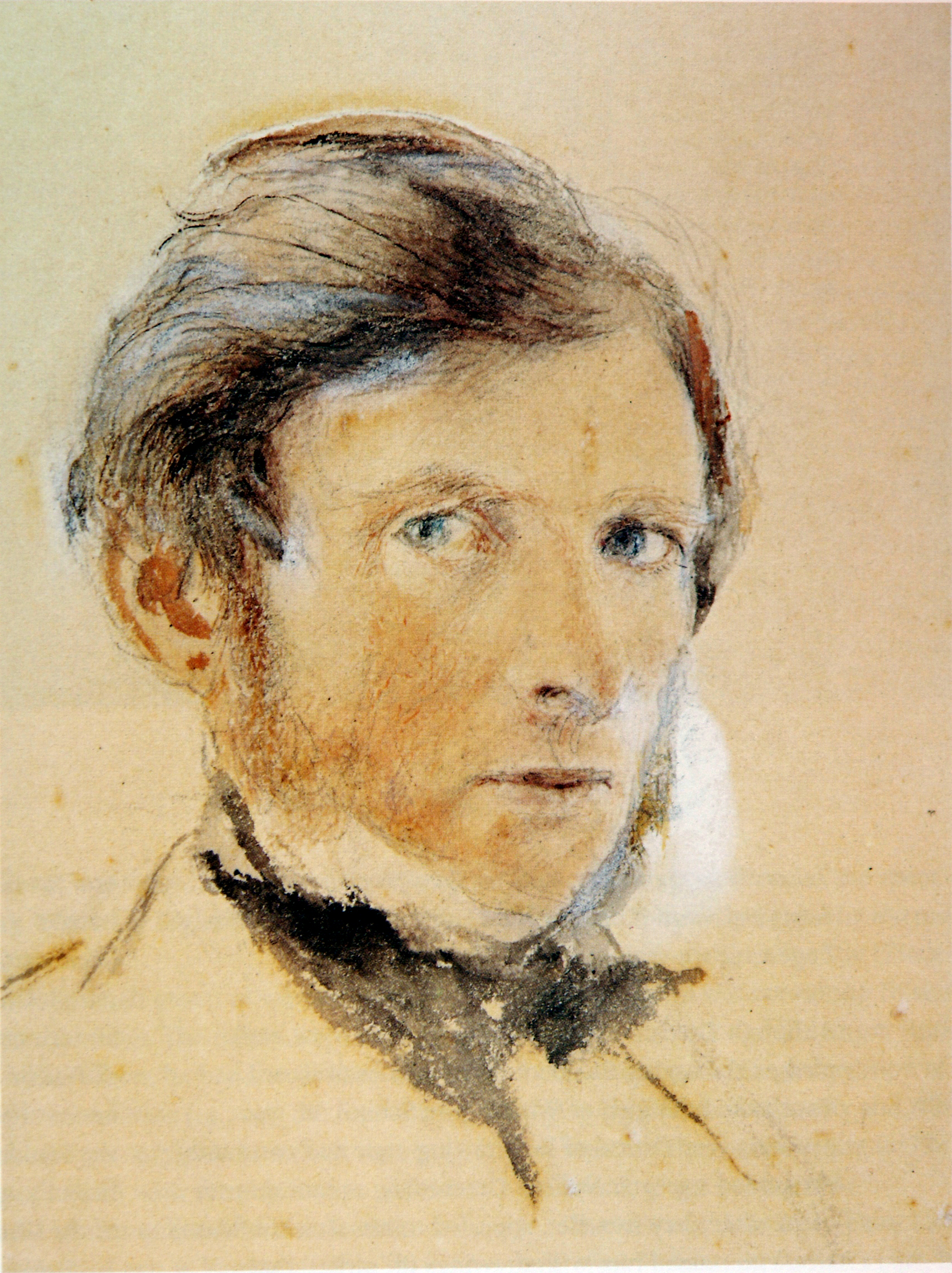
Self-portrait of John Ruskin, advocate of the Gothic Revival.

==== John Ruskin ====
John Ruskin (1819–1900), an art critic, wrote two books that were highly influential in Art Philosophy. In The Seven Lamps of Architecture (1849) and The Stones of Venice (1851–1853), he discussed the moral, social and religious implications of buildings, emphasising the desirability of an ethical approach to the practice of the arts. His thinking influenced the Pre-Raphaelites, whose artistic style Ruskin defended against criticism.

==== The Pre-Raphaelite Brotherhood, 1849–1853 ====
This group of artists, of whom Dante Gabriel Rossetti, Edward Burne-Jones, John Everett Millais and William Holman Hunt were the central figures, rejected the indulgent classicism, the materialism and the lack of social responsibility that they perceived in the artistic trends of mid-19th-century painting. They sought to recreate in their works the simple forms, bright colours, religious devotion and artistic anonymity of the period of art that preceded the rise of the great and famous individuals of the Renaissance period. They initially exhibited their works signed only with the initials PRB, Pre-Raphaelite Brotherhood.

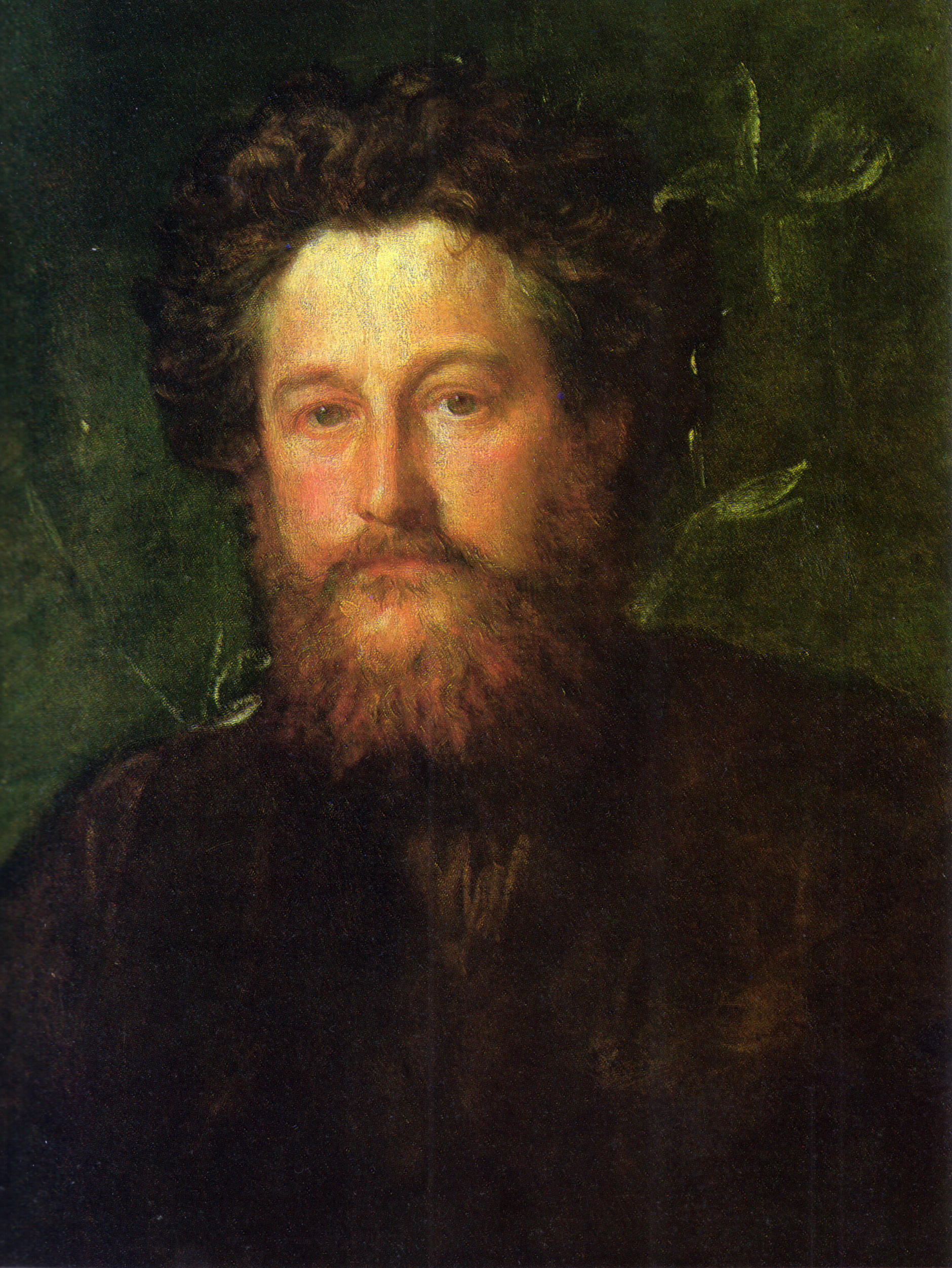
William Morris, designer, craftsman and teacher, portrait by George Frederic Watts, 1870

==== The Arts and Crafts Movement ====
William Morris (1834–1896) was for a time a member of the Pre-Raphaelite Brotherhood and was influenced by their ideals and those of John Ruskin. As a precociously diverse designer, he saw the creation of arts in terms of social responsibility. He rejected, as Ruskin did, the mass-production of ornate and decorative wares of all sorts, such as those products of industry that were displayed in the 1851 Crystal Palace Exhibition. Morris advocated a return to cottage crafts and the revival and promulgation of old skills. To this end he formed a business partnership with Marshall and Faulkner, employing Ford Madox Brown, another highly creative and dynamic artist and thus began what is termed "the Arts and Crafts Movement".

Stained glass was just one of many products of their studio. Morris and Brown saw themselves as original artists working in the spirit of their antecedents. They did not reproduce earlier forms exactly, and because of disagreements with the philosophy of the Cambridge Camden Society, rarely created stained glass windows for ancient churches.

William Morris's success as an entrepreneur was such that he was able to keep Rossetti, Burne-Jones and others in regular employment as designers. Through their teaching at the Working Men's College in London the group had enormous influence on many designers of all sorts.

==== The Aesthetic Movement ====
The Aesthetic Movement was a reaction against both the works of industry and the influential Socialist and Christian idealism of Morris and Ruskin who both saw art as directly linked to morality. Followers of the Aesthetic Movement, who included Burne-Jones and other stained glass designers such as Henry Holiday, propounded a philosophy of "Art for Art's sake". The style that evolved was sensuous and luxurious, linked with the rise of Art Nouveau.

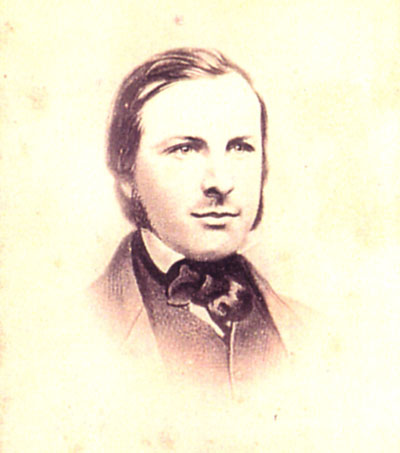
A. W. N. Pugin, architect and designer.

=== Architectural ===
==== Augustus Welby Northmore Pugin ====
A. W. N. Pugin (1812–1852) was the son of the Neo-Gothic architect Augustus Charles Pugin and was a convert to Roman Catholicism in 1835. He built his first church in 1837. He was an enormously productive and meticulous church architect and designer of interiors. With the growth of Roman Catholicism in England, and the development of large industrial centres there was much scope for his talents. He worked with and employed other designers and was instrumental in encouraging the firm of John Hardman and Co. of Birmingham to turn their attention to the production of glass.

Pugin's most renowned designs are the interiors, particularly the House of Lords, that he designed for the architect Sir Charles Barry, (1795–1860) at the Houses of Parliament in London. After the destruction by fire of the Houses of Parliament in 1834, Barry had won the commission for their rebuilding, the stipulation being that they should be in the Gothic style, as the most significant part of the Medieval complex, the Great Hall of Westminster, remained standing. The rebuilding, which took up the rest of Barry's life, included a vast array of arts and crafts of all kinds, not the least of which was stained glass windows, both pictorial and armorial. The knowledge, elegance and sophistication of Pugin's designs imbue and unite the interiors. As an ecclesiastical designer, his influence upon every medium is hard to overstate.

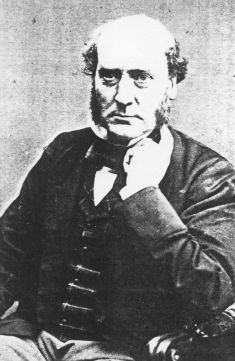
Sir George Gilbert Scott, architect and restorer of cathedrals.

==== Sir George Gilbert Scott ====
As an architect George Gilbert Scott, (1811–1878), was persuaded by Pugin to turn his creativity towards Gothic Revival. Scott was an Anglican, his first significant commission being the design of the Martyrs' Memorial in Oxford, a powerful and highly visible architectural statement against the Oxford Movement. To Sir Gilbert fell the task of restoration of many of England's finest Medieval structures including Salisbury, Worcester, Chester, Ely and Durham Cathedrals. In the restorations, he was to employ and influence a great number of designers, including major stained glass firms.

==== John Loughborough Pearson ====
Pearson (1817–1897) was, like Scott, chiefly a restorer of churches. His major work was the creation of the new cathedral at Truro in Cornwall.

==== Greek Thomson ====
Alexander Thomson, nicknamed "Greek", (1817–1875), was one of the best known Scottish architects of his day and had a profound effect on later architects, particularly Charles Rennie MacIntosh. His building designs are curious and eclectic combinations of elements from the Classical, the Italian Renaissance, the Egyptian and the Exotic. He designed a number of churches with richly decorated interiors and employed several stained glass firms to furnish them with glass in the appropriate style.

=== Manufacturing ===
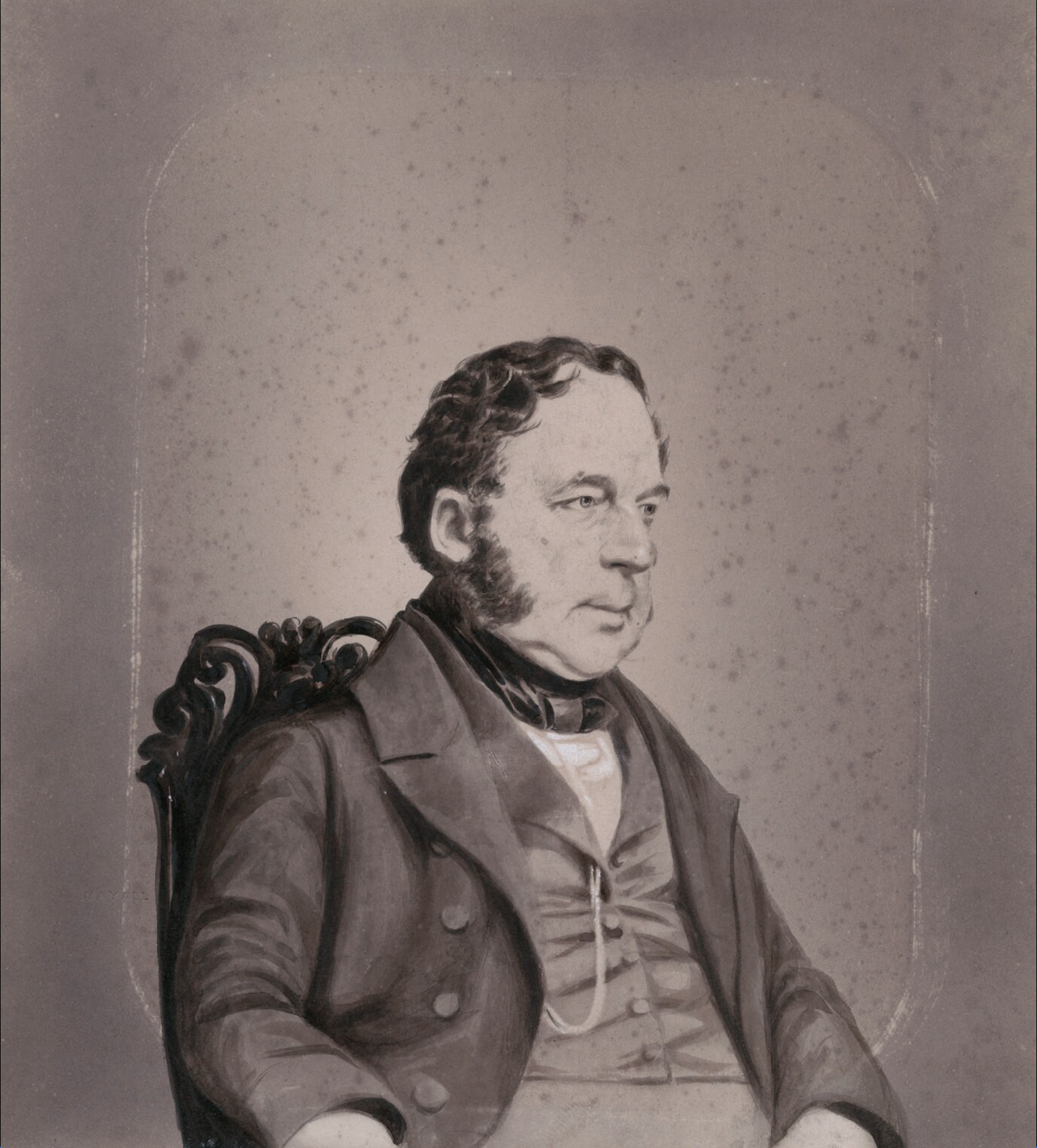
Thomas Willement

==== Industrial Revolution ====
With the growth of industry in the late 18th and early 19th centuries, and in particular the growth of those industries associated with commercial glass production, metal trades, metallurgy and the associated technical advancements, the scene was set for the revival of stained glass manufacture and the development of that industry on an unprecedented scale. Thomas Willement, a plumber and glazier, produced his first armorial window in 1811, and is known as the father of the 19th-century stained glass industry. Because of the prevalence of leadlight windows, many glaziers had the required skills for making windows in geometric patterns using coloured glass for chapels and churches. Between 1820 and 1840 some 40 different glass painters appear in the London trades directories. At the time of the showcase of Victorian enterprise, the Crystal Palace Exhibition of 1851, stained glass manufacture had reached a point where 25 firms were able to display their works, including John Hardman of Birmingham, William Wailes of Newcastle, Ballantine and Allen of Edinburgh, Betton and Evans of Shrewsbury and William Holland of Warwick.

==== Charles Winston ====
Charles Winston was a 19th-century lawyer whose hobby was the study of Medieval glass. In 1847 he published an influential book on its styles and production, including a translation from Theophilus' On Diverse Arts, the foremost Medieval treatise on painting, stained glass and metalwork, written in the early 12th century.

Winston's interest in the technicalities of coloured glass production led him to take shards of medieval glass to James Powell and Sons of Whitefriars for analyses and reproduction. Winston observed that windows of medieval glass appeared more luminous than those of early 19th-century production, and set his mind to discovering why this was the case. Winston observed that light streaming through a 19th-century window generally made a coloured pattern on the floor. This was rarely the case with medieval glass. He concluded that the reason that 19th-century glass lacked brilliance was because it was too flat and regular, allowing the light to pass through directly. He recommended a return to the manufacture of hand-made crown and cylinder glass with all their inherent refractive irregularities for the specific purpose of creating stained glass windows.

== Stylistic developments in 19th-century stained-glass windows ==
The stylistic trends below did not necessarily follow each other consecutively. Rather, they overlapped and co-existed. Some stained glass studios were essentially a one-man show in which a single craftsmen designed and made windows of a particular style. Other firms were managed with considerable entrepreneurial skills, employing a number of designers. Some designers freelanced- their work can be seen in windows by a number of firms. Some firms changed with changing tastes and survived well into the 20th century. John Hardman & Co. is still in business.

(For Glossary of Terms, see below.)

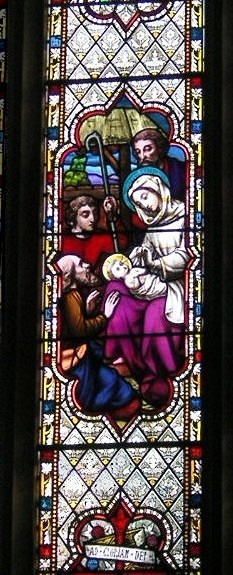
Window with hand-painted quarries.

=== Armorial windows ===
These contain precisely painted shields and heraldic decoration utilising painterly skills that had remained in use during the 17th and 18th centuries. Thomas Willement was an armorial painter of windows.

=== Geometric patterns ===
These windows are simple and decorative, frequently utilising the skills of the provincial plumber/glazier. Many of these windows are among the earliest use of coloured glass but comparatively few have survived because later Victorians have replaced them with more elaborate pictorial windows. Some of these windows date from the 1820s.

=== Quarries ===
These windows are usually patterned with fleur de lys and other floral motifs that were suited to the shape of the diamond panes. They added a pleasant glowing ambience to an interior and in many churches in the early 19th century made up the entire glazing. They could be painted or stencilled with designs and are sometimes mould-cast or have impressed motifs. They were systematically replaced one by one when more elaborate windows were donated. These windows generally date from 1830 to 1860. Powell was a major supplier of impressed and stencilled quarries.

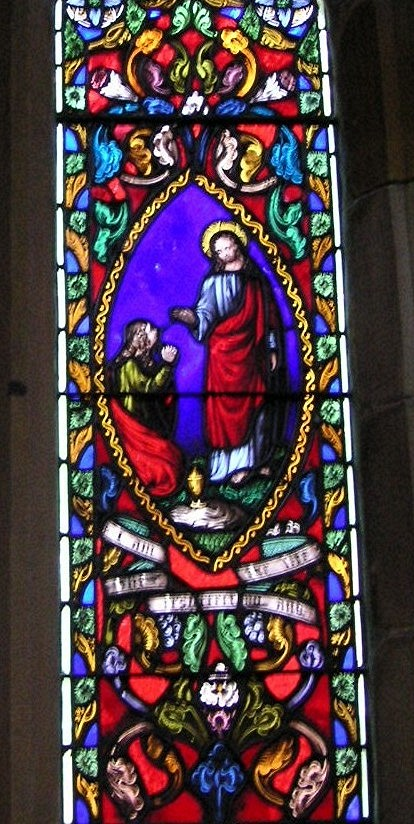
Medieval foliage and Classical Figures.

=== Medieval foliate windows ===
From studying Medieval windows, particularly those at Canterbury Cathedral, many stained glass artists became adept at designing foliage and decorative borders that reproduce archaeological originals. There are windows of this type in which the foliate design is overlaid with banners bearing scriptural texts.

In those windows that are set with figurative rondels, the style within them is often Classical (see below) but sometimes Medievalising and sometimes seeks to reproduce the original style so accurately that to they casual eye they have the appearance of ancient windows. Ancient windows in Canterbury Cathedral were removed in the 19th century and replaced with copies. There is a very fine Jesse Tree (the Ancestors of Christ) window of this nature at the eastern end. Two panels of the original have since been returned.

=== Classical figures ===
Although often striving for an exotic appearance, the figures in many early 19th-century windows are classicising in style. Set against a background of geometry, quarries or foliage, the small painted incidents within rondels and quatrefoils are nearly always conservatively academic in their appearance, with figures based on those in engravings of works by admired painters, Raphael, Titian, Andrea del Sarto and Perugino. Often in the case of windows with ornate foliage, the archaeologically correct surrounds are at variance with the style of the rondels which make no attempt to reproduce the medieval. William Wailes and Charles Edmund Clutterbuck were among the important firms.

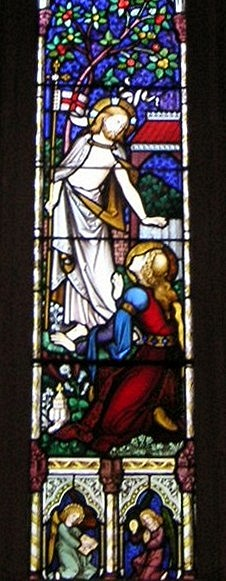
Gothic forms and pure colour.

=== Gothic Revival ===
Inspired by Ruskin, Pugin and the Gothic Revival, some artists sought to reproduce the style of figures that they saw in ancient glass, illuminated manuscripts and the few remaining English wall paintings of the Gothic period. A major source was provided by the Biblia Pauperum or so-called "Poor Man's Bible". The resulting figures are elongated, curvilinear and stylised rather than naturalistic. The drapery folds and scrolls are exaggerated and the gestures are expansive. The painted details are highly linear, crisply defined and elegant. The style lent itself to narrative, to pure colour and to highly decorative effects. While the figures may seem quaint or even naïve, the quality of design of many of these windows is often highly sophisticated and the detailing exquisite. The masters of Gothic revival were John Hardman and Co. of Birmingham and Clayton and Bell.

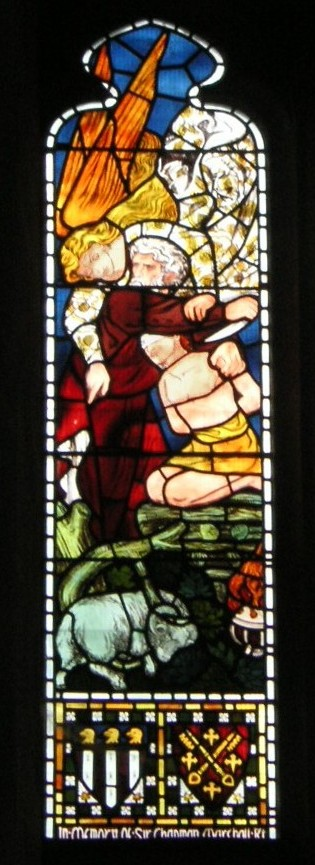
Asymmetric design with bold colours

=== Arts and Crafts Movement ===
The group that surrounded and were influenced by William Morris passed through a series of trends, initially Pre-Raphaelite, which, although espousing the Medieval, was not Gothic Revival in the archaeological sense, being an esoteric mix of Medieval, Early Renaissance and deeply personal influences. The Arts and Crafts style lent itself to the depiction of solidly working-class apostles and virtues set against backgrounds of quarries that resemble glazed earthenware tiles. The botanically accurate and semi-realistic grapevines, sunflowers and other growing things were more prominent than Gothic canopies. Narratives that emphasised hard labour, human decency and charitable love were the themes that lent themselves to enthusiastic treatment by Morris and Ford Madox Brown. Burne-Jones and Dante Gabriel Rossetti were to become philosophic traitors to the Arts and Crafts Movement by their association with the Aesthetic Movement.

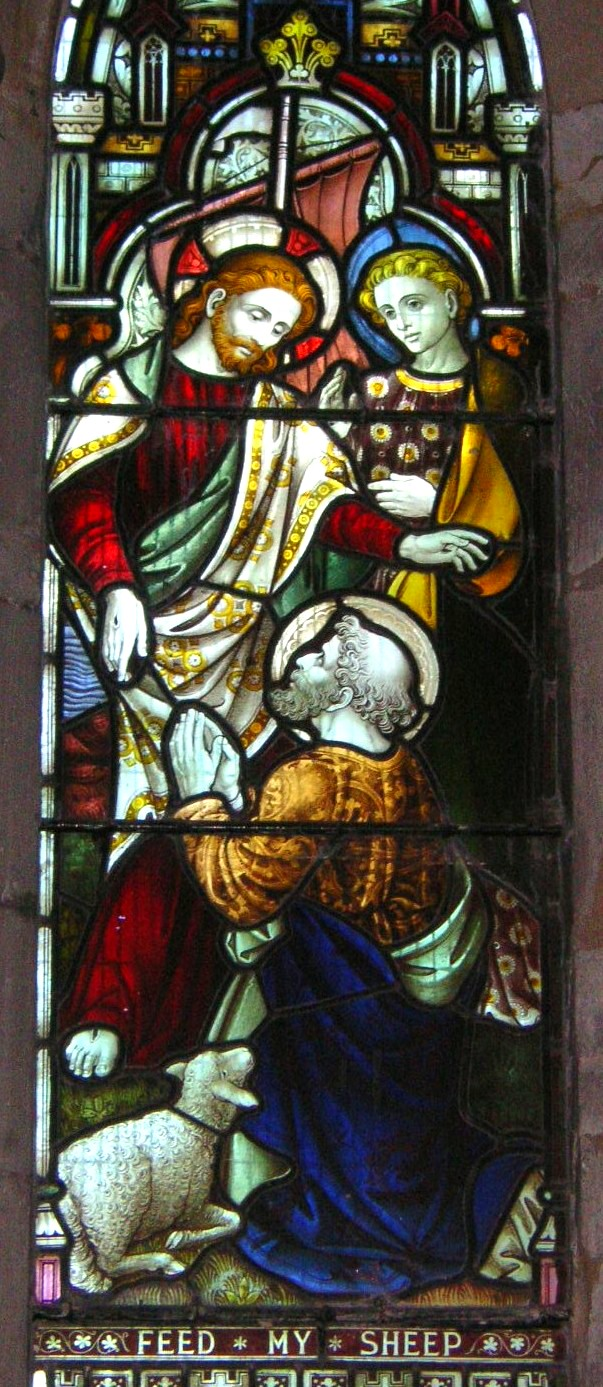
Human interest and tertiary colours.

=== Naturalism ===
The 1870s was a time of rich ornamentation and eclecticism in the arts. The treatment of Gothic canopies which were a feature of so many windows began to change from the brightly coloured, two-dimensional, playful appearance of the 1850s and 60s to an appearance of having been carved from fine white limestone. Tudor and Renaissance architectural details made an appearance and were often used without reference to the nature of the real architecture that enclosed the window. The art of painting canopies in this manner was diligently maintained until after World War I.

The Gothic style of figure painting began to give way to a more naturalistic style in which the figures seem more three-dimensional and portrait-like. An important source at this time was German wood engravings and etchings. These were available in a number of forms. Bibles and Bible picture books were available with several different series of such engravings. The works of Albrecht Dürer were much admired. One of the advantages of using engravings as a source was that the essentially linear techniques that were employed by the engraver to define forms could be easily interpreted in lead and the fine linear treatment of shadows was likewise easy for the stained glass artist to achieve using the monochrome paint technique. There were also windows imported into England at this time from the studios of Mayer of Munich which influenced English designers towards this style.

In the late 19th century there is often a great richness in the colouration of the windows, marked by a use of tertiary colours including rich purple, salmon pink, olive green, claret red, saffron and brown. Flashed glass was skillfully employed to enhance deep folds in robes. With this interest in colour, many windows depict atmospheric effects. Sunsets, glowering storm clouds and blazing glories appear behind the figures.

In line with the naturalistic drafting of the figures, there is a pictorial emphasis on depicting human interaction and response, often with detailed facial expressions and rather flamboyant gestures. Large scenes with large figures were popular. Among the major exponents were Lavers, Barraud and Westlake; and Heaton, Butler and Bayne. These trends continued, taking two basic directions until World War I.

The notable exceptions to the general trend were a large number of the windows made by Clayton and Bell who produced a diverse range of styles and continued to supply cheerfully coloured Gothic-style windows with a proliferation of bright red and yellow to catch the morning sun in church chancels.

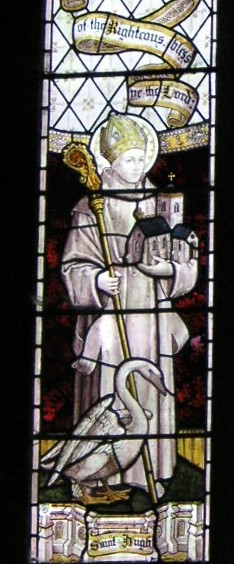
Elegant figures in subdued colours.

=== Refinement ===
A somewhat more reserved style emerged in which the vibrant colouration is toned down in favour of backgrounds that are basically white, discreetly enhanced with yellow-stain. The clothing of the figures is often of the darker shades, royal blue, wine red and dark green and is lined or bordered with intricately decorated yellow-stained glass. The painting of canopies and draperies was taken to a new height. The monochrome painting of faces is intensely detailed. The style lent itself to the depiction of saints and prophets, bishops and admirals, and Christ (or Queen Victoria) enthroned. The most influential firm in this style was Burlison and Grylls. There are many windows by Charles Eamer Kempe of this type.

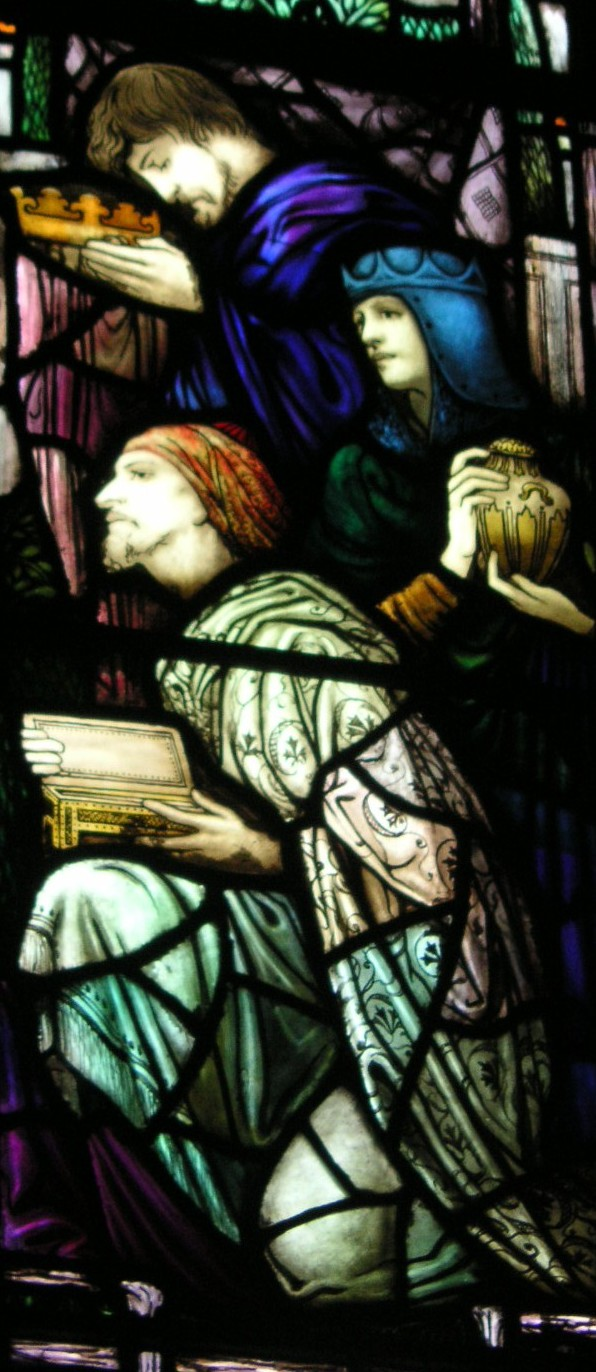
Individual. Much use of opalescent glass.

Aestheticism

The Aesthetic Movement included Dante Gabriel Rossetti, Burne-Jones, the illustrator Aubrey Beardsley and writer Oscar Wilde. They propounded "Art for Art's sake", claiming that Beauty was an end in itself and that the creation of art should not be bound to any social or moral ideals. The Aesthetic artists were primarily concerned with the creation of that which was beautiful. Because of this, windows created by these artists are often stylistically diverse from each other and from other styles, yet are highly recognisable as the work of a particular designer, rather than of a particular workshop.

These windows rarely pay homage to Medieval origins. They are closely associated with Art Nouveau. The designs are often sinuous, luscious and richly textured, making highly creative use of flashed glass and repetitive forms. Drifting clouds, sweeping draperies and angel's wings lent themselves to the art of the Aesthetes. The idiosyncrasies of Burne-Jones’ style make his windows particularly easy to recognise. While Charles Eamer Kempe made many windows that were traditional and "safe", he designed others that are clearly aesthetic. Christopher Whall and, in America, Tiffany were Aesthetic designers.

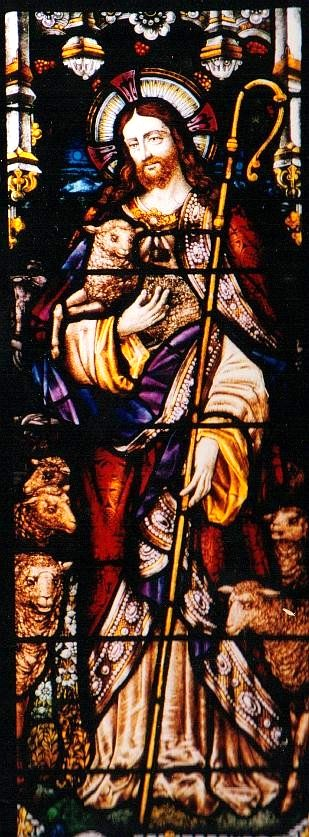
Luxurious drapery, pearl borders.

=== Opulence ===
In the last days of the Empire, the technical proficiency and artistic excesses of the traditional stained glass artists reached their height. The windows of this period demonstrate a high level of skill over figure drawing and stained glass painting. The artists had developed ways of achieving a wide variety of textural effects through the application of ground-glass paint and yellow-stain:- babies’ ringlets, old men's beards, silk brocade, dove's feather, ripe grapes, gold braid, glowing pearls and greasy sheep's wool could all be painted realistically by any number of studios. Many windows of the Edwardian period are the most opulent creations of the stained glass industry. The youthful Virgin of the Annunciation, Peter the fisherman, John the itinerant preacher and Joseph the carpenter are all depicted in lavish robes, lined with cloth of gold and decorated at the edges with rubies and pearls.

In the years immediately following World War I, many of these windows were created by the more conservative studios as memorials to fallen soldiers. Hence there are countless two-light windows of St George and St Michael and even more lancets of the Good Shepherd gathering his lost sheep to the fold. These are the last product of the second Golden Age of stained glass window production.

=== Gallery ===
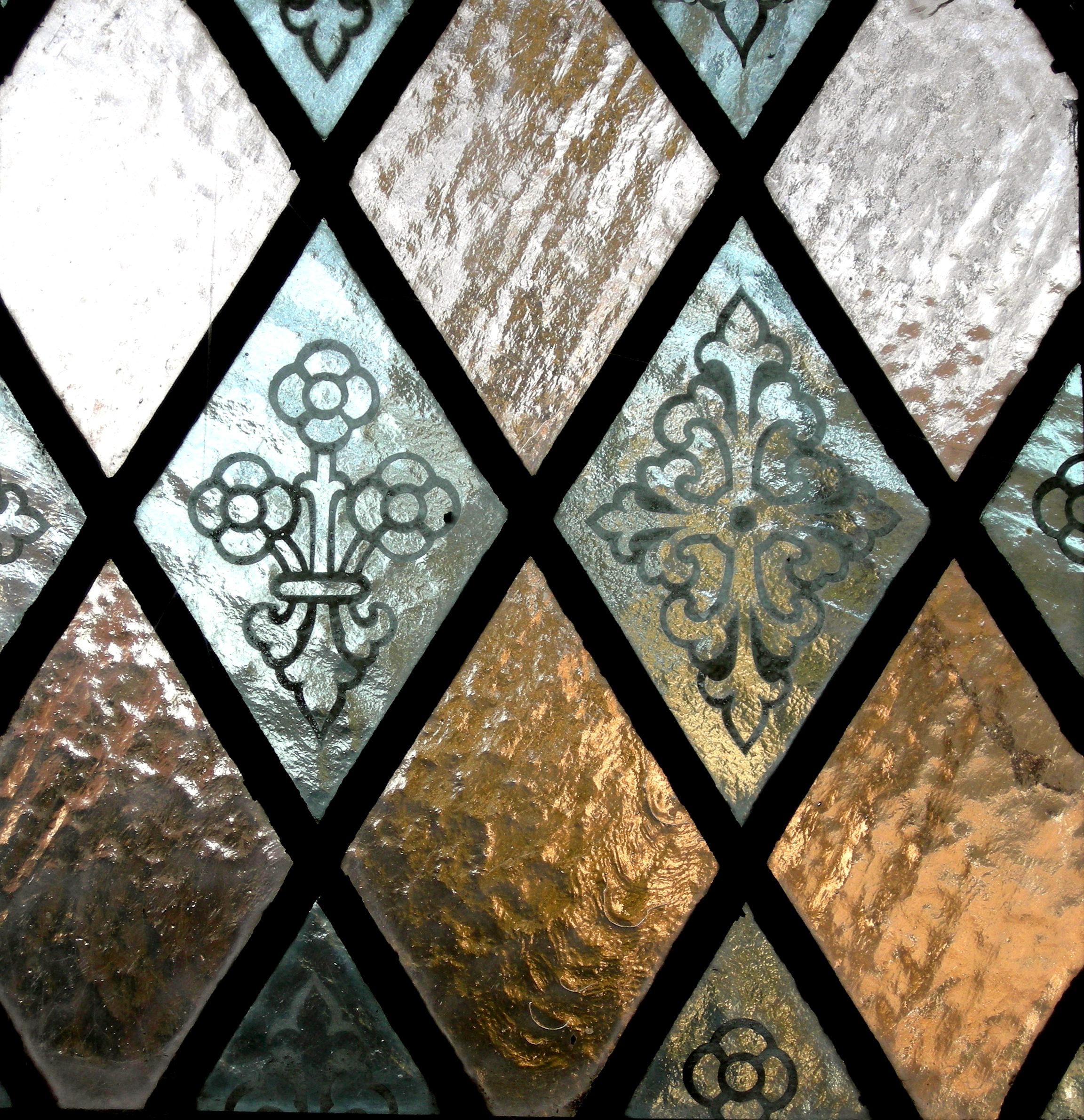
Stencilled quarries of cathedral glass, c. 1900

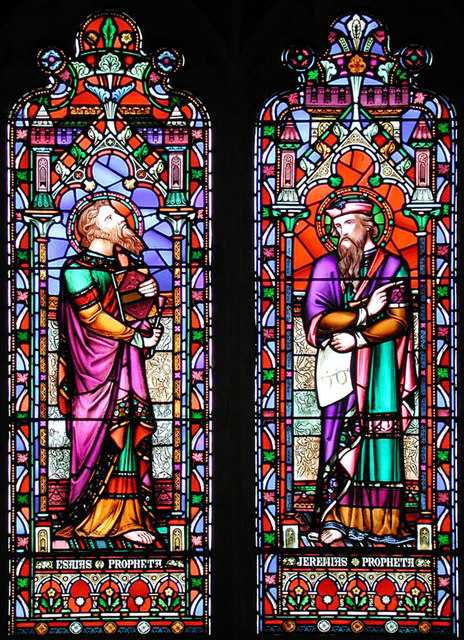
Lavers and Barraud, 1864, St Mildred, Tenterden

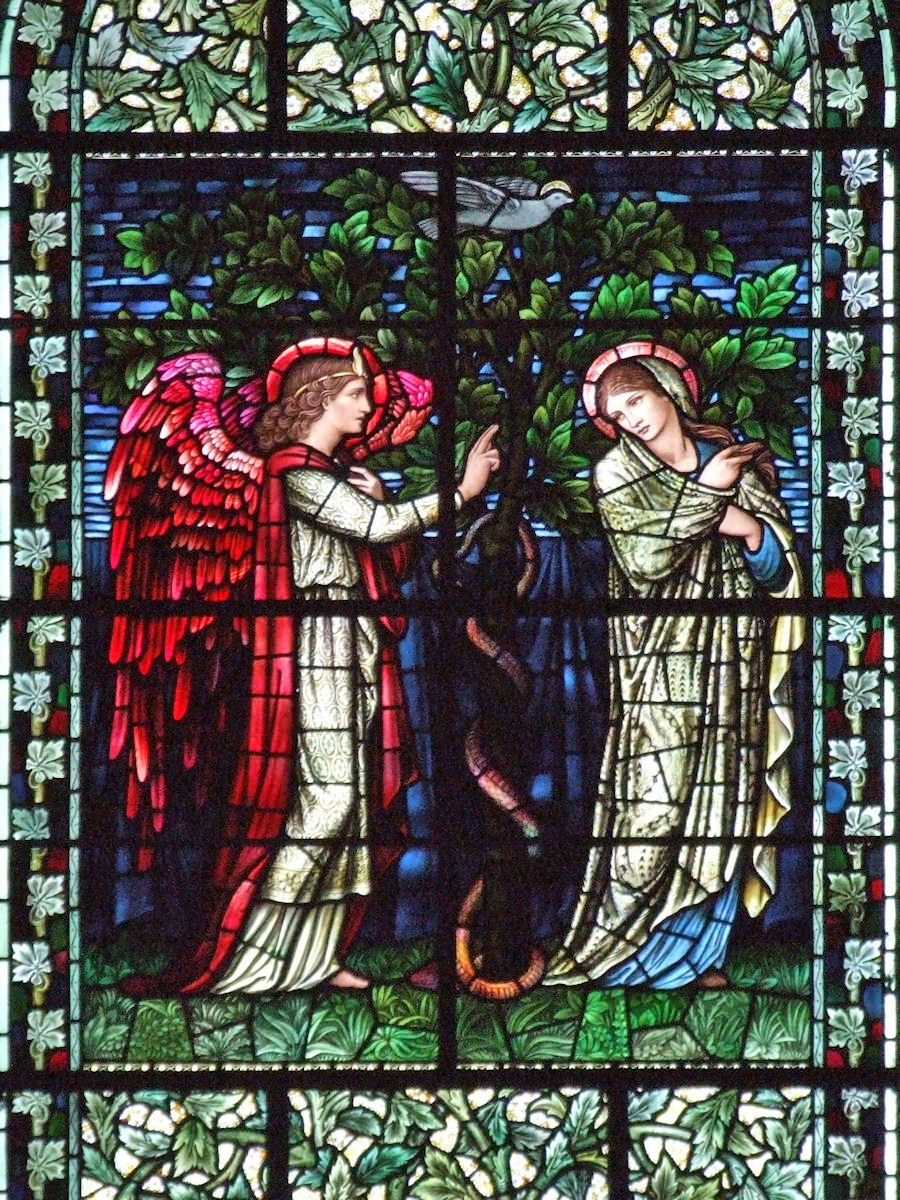
Burne-Jones window Winchester Cathedral

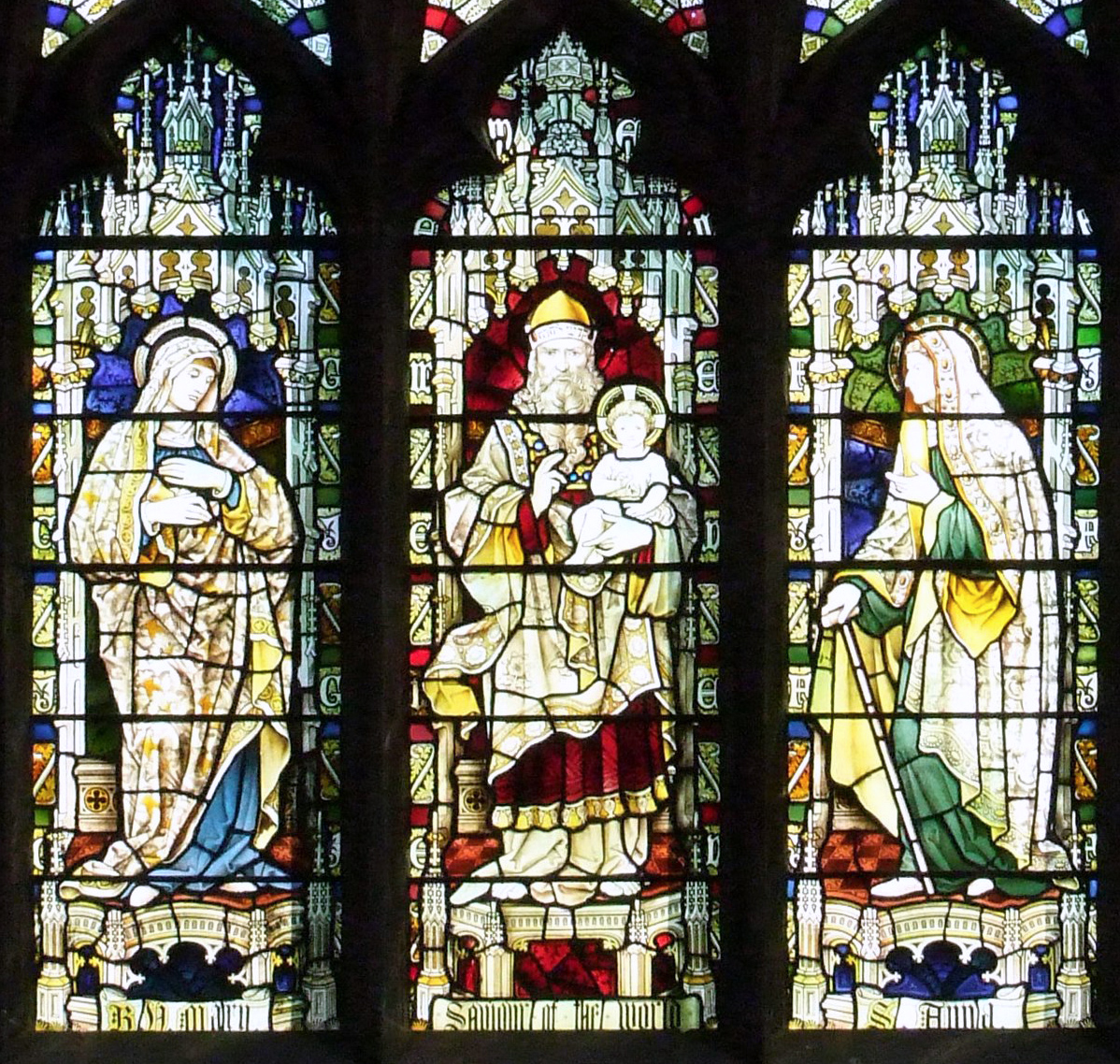
Heaton Butler and Bayne at Chester Cathedral

== Common types of 19th-century windows based on content ==
(For Glossary of terms', see below. The terms in italics are explained.)

- Small rectangular or diaper quarries of clear glass set with an armorial shield, the colours being painted and fired onto the glass.
- Simple geometric decorative patterns in repeating shapes based on large, often overlapping, circles, squares and diapers set against a background of clear or decorated quarries, often within a plain brightly coloured border, surrounded by an additional clear border.
- Densely patterned diaper-shaped quarries with the design either hand painted in grisaille and yellow-stain or moulded and printed into the glass. See No.1 below
- Quarry windows set with one or more roundels, quatrefoils or mandorlas containing a symbol, figure or biblical scene.
- Elaborate, intensely coloured foliage-based patterns, usually set with figurative roundels or quatrefoils and imitating Norman and Early Gothic windows. See No.2 below
- Rows of apostles, saints, prophets or virtues, each occupying one light and usually set in an architectural frame surmounted by an ornate canopy. In the case of a large window with an irregular number of lights, the figure of Jesus or the Virgin with the Christ Child is usually at the centre. See No.3 below
- A series of related narrative scenes, each depicted in a single light within architectural surrounds. See No.4 below
- A series of small related narratives depicted in rows across several lights, like a comic strip. See No.5 below
- A single significant incident or theme occupying a window of several lights so that the pictorial content spans the divisions in the window. See Nos.6&7 below
- A complex arrangement in a large window where a central incident spread across several lights is surrounded by related themes in the outer lights, lower panels and tracery. See No.8 for two related themes within a small window.

== Makers ==
=== Important English firms ===
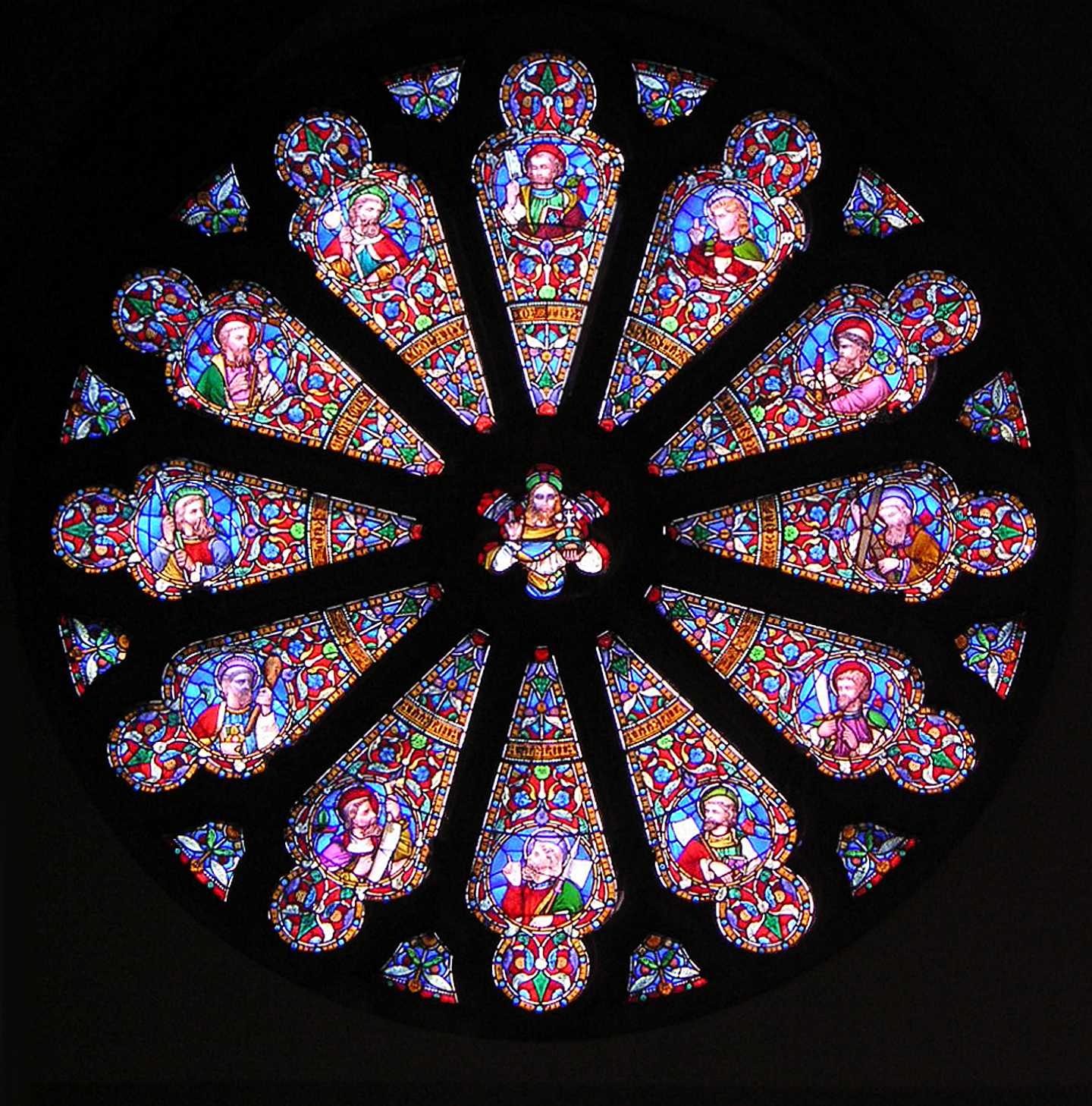
Exquisite glass by William Wailes in a Gothic Revival wheel window by G. G. Scott

- 1811. Thomas Willement, "the father of Victorian stained glass", active 1811–1869, a plumber by trade, created his first armorial window in 1811, was a restorer of old windows and received a Royal Patent from Queen Victoria. Was employed by Pugin who found him too expensive.
- 1832–1875. William Warrington, (1796–1869)
- 1836– Ward and Nixon established
- 1838–present. John Hardman & Co. Was extensively employed by Pugin.
- 1841–1910. William Wailes, Newcastle.
- 1844– . James Powell & Sons, makers of glass since the 17th century. Stained glass production commenced in 1844. Their glassworks were situated in the Whitefriars part of London, so their windows were signed with a small monk.
- 1848– . Alexander Gibbs. In business from 1813.
- 1855– . Clayton and Bell.
- 1855– . Heaton, Butler and Bayne.
- 1855–1921 . Lavers and Barraud. Westlake became a partner in 1868.
- 1868– . Burlison and Grylls.
- 1875– Shrigley and Hunt.
- 1861–1875 Morris, Marshall, Faulkner & Co., with Ford Madox Brown, Burne-Jones, Philip Webb and John Henry Dearle who continued the company after the deaths of Morris in 1896 and Brown in 1898 as Morris and Co. until 1940.
- 1866–1934. Charles Eamer Kempe whose later partner was his nephew Tower.
- 1891–1927 Henry Holiday
- fl. c. 1897–1924. Christopher Whall Born 1849, he was an important member of the Arts and Crafts Movement.
- 1874–1926 J. Dudley Forsyth, oils, sculptor and stained glass designer. Works include Westminster Abbey and St Mary's Church, Culford, Suffolk.
- Arts and Crafts period, (Newton) Jones and Willett of London and Birmingham; exhibited at the Great Exhibition of 1851. Works at the Anglican Chapel, Burra, South Australia and possibly an identical window depicting Christ's Crucifixion St Mary's Church, Culford, Suffolk.

=== Important Scottish firms ===
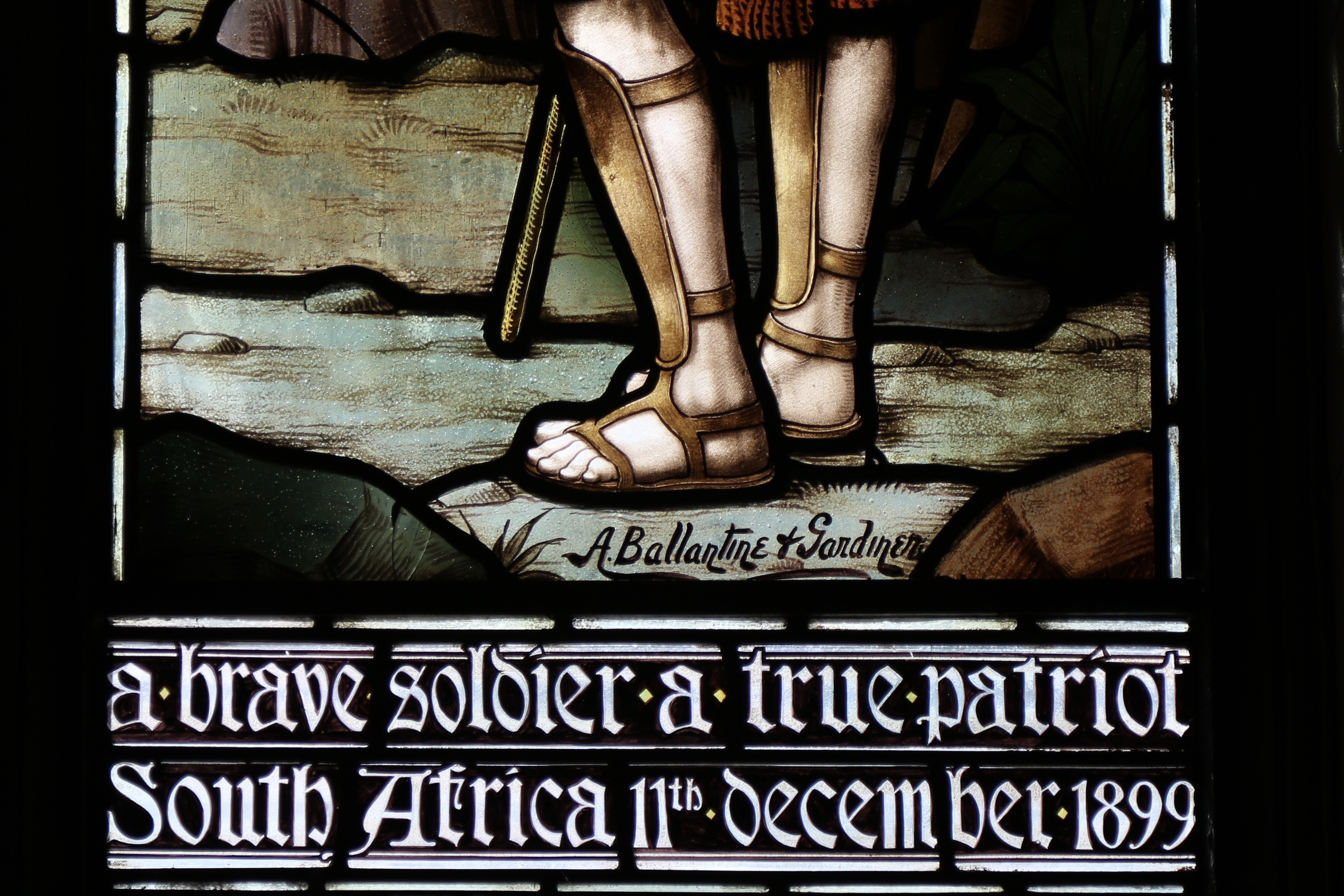
Maker's mark of Ballantine and Gardiner in St Giles' Cathedral, Edinburgh

- 1828–, William Cairney & Sons, then John Cairney & Co, Glasgow. Daniel Cottier, who is said to have influenced Tiffany greatly, was trained in John Cairney's studio.
- 1837–1940, Ballantine and Allan, Edinburgh, at one point Ballantine and Gardiner, also James Ballantine and Sons, Alex Ballantine and Son and sometimes Ballantyne. There were three generations of Ballantines. The firm was founded by James (1807–1887), man of letters and writer, taken over by his son Alex, then by HIS son James, who died in an accident in 1940.
- 1847–, David Kier & Sons, originally from Irvine. They were the glaziers responsible for installing the controversial Munich glass in Glasgow cathedral.
- 1850–, Hugh Bogle & Co. Hugh Bogle was originally a house painter in Glasgow. In the mid- to late 19th century, like many other Scottish firms, his company began to offer stained glass.
- 1860–, J.& W. Guthrie John and William were the sons of John Guthrie, who established a firm of painters and decorators in Glasgow around 1850. They formed a stained glass partnership around 1874, later to become Guthrie and Wells. John Gordon Guthrie, son of William, emigrated to America, where he was hugely important in the development of the art there.
- 1865–, Daniel Cottier (1838–1891). Glasgow then London, New York and Sydney.
- pre-1855 Field and Allen, Edinburgh and Leith, started making windows in 1859. The company folded in 1900, by which time it had ceased making windows.

=== Important Irish firms ===
- c. 1830–1842, Michael O'Connor in Dublin
- 1842–, Michael O'Connor in England
- 1861–1975 Earley and Company in Dublin* 1901–, Alfred E. Child working and teaching in Dublin
- 1903–1943+ An Túr Gloine, stained glass co-operative under Sarah Purser and Edward Martyn
- Harry Clarke

== Glossary of terms used above ==
- Lancet – a single simply shaped window that is tall and narrow, and with a pointed arch at the top so that its shape is similar to a knife blade.
- Mullion – a vertical stone architectural member which divides and supports sections of a large window.
- Tracery – the pattern of stonework found at the tops of many windows.
- Light – one discreet section of a window of any shape, but most usually applied to the tall vertical sections when the window is divided up by stone mullions.
- Tracery lights – the irregularly shaped sections of glass that fill the tracery at the tops of windows.
- Panel – a part of a window that is constructed as a single piece. Most church windows with the exception of small lancets contain several panels.
- Diaper – a diamond or lozenge-shaped piece of glass. Many old windows, both ecclesiastical and domestic, are made from glass in a diaper pattern. Many figurative windows have a background of diapers.
- Quarry – a four-sided geometrically shaped piece of glass, coloured, painted, printed or impressed with a design and used to create a regular decorative pattern in a window.
- Grisaille – monochrome painting on glass using a mixture of ground glass, ground lead and other substances.
- Yellow-stain – a pigment of silver nitrate painted and fired on the surface of a window to give a bright yellow colour.
- Stone-border – a thin border of glass, generally white or transparent but sometimes red, encircling a window light and giving a radiant effect.
- Roundels, quatrefoils and mandorlas – these are shapes to be found within window designs, containing a picture or significant motif. A roundel is circular, a quatrefoil has four lobes like a simple flower, a mandorla is the shape enclosed by two arcs, meeting at points top and bottom and usually only used to contain a depiction of Christ or a symbol of him. It is sometimes also used for a depiction of the Virgin Mary.
- Canopy – a motif found in many windows representing an elaborate architectural canopy, usually Gothic in style but occasionally Classical. The canopy and accompanying columns give the visual impression that the figure or scene is set in a carved niche or viewed through an elaborate window.
- Flashed glass – is glass which is made by dipping the blowing rod, or "pontil", into one colour then a second, and sometimes a third, before blowing to a sheet. The resulting sheet has a thin layer of a darker colour "flashed" over a paler colour. The dark colour can be removed, or partially removed, by abrading or etching. It is frequently used for heraldry.
- Norman style – windows with semicircular tops, in which the glass is usually divided into geometric sections by iron bracing. In the style of the 11th and 12th centuries.
- Gothic style – with pointed arches
- Early English (Gothic) – lancet-shaped windows that are often grouped together. In the style of the mid 12th to early 13th centuries.
- Geometric (Decorated Gothic) – pointed-arched windows which have tracery in circle-based geometric designs. In the style of the mid-13th to early 14th centuries.
- Curvilinear or Flowing (Decorated Gothic) – Gothic windows which have tracery with S-shaped curves and flame-like forms, sometimes very elaborate. In the style of the 14th century.
- Perpendicular (Gothic) – Gothic windows which appear wide with flattened pointed arches and are divided by regular vertical mullion and, in very large windows, horizontal transoms. In the style of the late 14th to early 16th centuries.
- Classical – windows with semi-circular arches and designs that are imitative of Classical Roman or Renaissance form and detail.

== See also ==
- Gothic Revival – Architectural movement
- Harry Clarke – Darkness in Light
- Poor Man's Bible – Art created to illustrate the teachings of the Bible
