= Ward and Hughes =

English company producing stained-glass windows

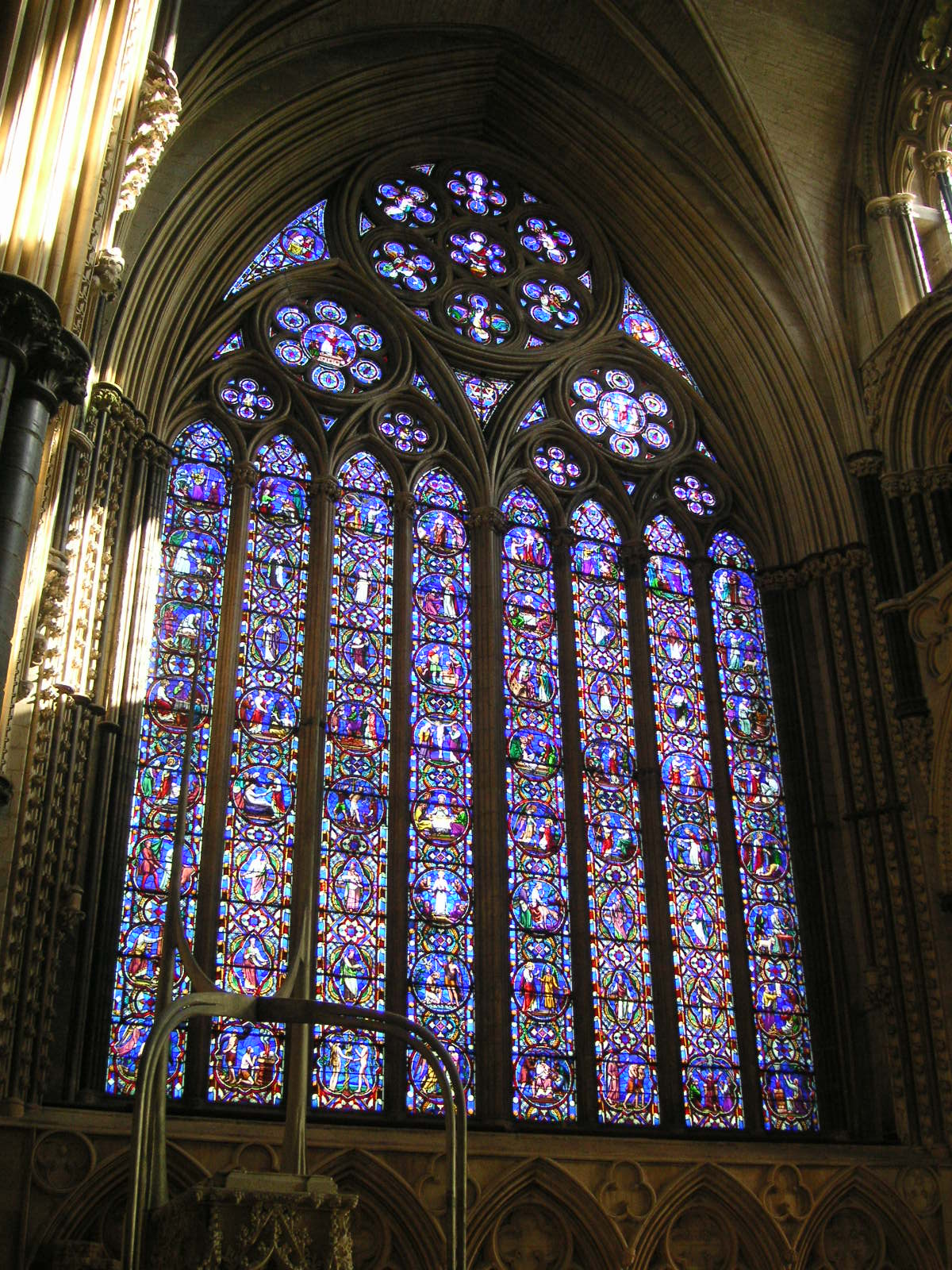
The East Window of Lincoln Cathedral, Ward and Hughes (1855)

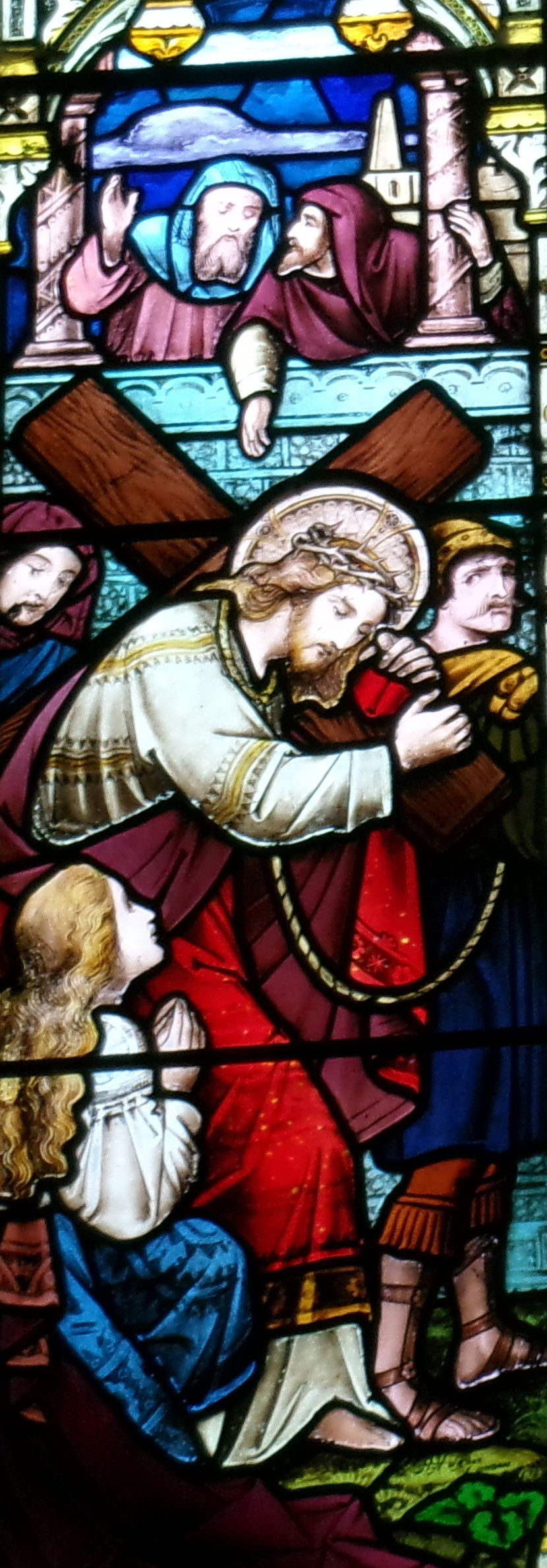
Detail of a Ward and Hughes window in St Peter's Church, Britford, Wiltshire

Ward and Hughes (formerly Ward and Nixon) was the name of an English company producing stained-glass windows.

== History ==
Ward and Hughes was preceded by the company Ward and Nixon, whose studio was at 67 Frith Street, Soho. They created a large window for St Stephen Coleman Street, London. James Henry Nixon worked on the restoration of the famous medieval stained glass at St. Neots in Cornwall as early as 1829. The firm became a favourite of Charles Winston, which helped them gain prestigious commissions like the east window of Lincoln Cathedral. In 1857 Nixon died and his pupil, Henry Hughes, became the partner of Thomas Ward, and the business was renamed Ward and Hughes. Henry Hughes died on 17 February 1883 and was buried in a family vault (no.14843) on the western side of Highgate Cemetery.

T. F. Curtis took over the firm and continued production as T. F. Curtis, Ward and Hughes until the late 1920s.

== Works by Ward and Hughes ==
In England:

- St. Michael's Church, Sowton, Devon
- Church of the Good Shepherd, Brighton, East Sussex
- St. Mary's Church, Kingsclere, Hampshire
- Church of St. Peter & St. Andrew, Blofield, Norfolk
- St. Peter's Church, Bramerton, Norfolk
- St. Andrew's Church, Buxton, Norfolk
- St. Mary's Church, Colkirk, Norfolk
- St. Margaret's Church, Drayton, Norfolk
- St. Peter's Church, Dunton, Norfolk
- All Saints' Church, East Winch, Norfolk
- St. Peter's Church, Ellingham, Norfolk (Naomi and Ruth)
- St. Margaret's Church, Felthorpe, Norfolk
- All Saints' Church, Filby, Norfolk
- St. Martin's Church, Hindringham, Norfolk (martyrdom of St. Martin)
- St. Mary the Virgin Church, Staverton, Northamptonshire
- St. John the Evangelist's Church, Essington, South Staffordshire
- St. Mary's Church, Billingshurst, West Sussex
- St. James' Church, Draycot Cerne, Wiltshire
- Salisbury Cathedral, Salisbury, Wiltshire

In Scotland:

- St Peter's Scottish Episcopal Church, Musselburgh, East Lothian

== See also ==
- Gothic Revival
- Stained glass - British glass, 1811-1918
- Victorian Era
