= James Henry Nixon =

British illustrator and painter

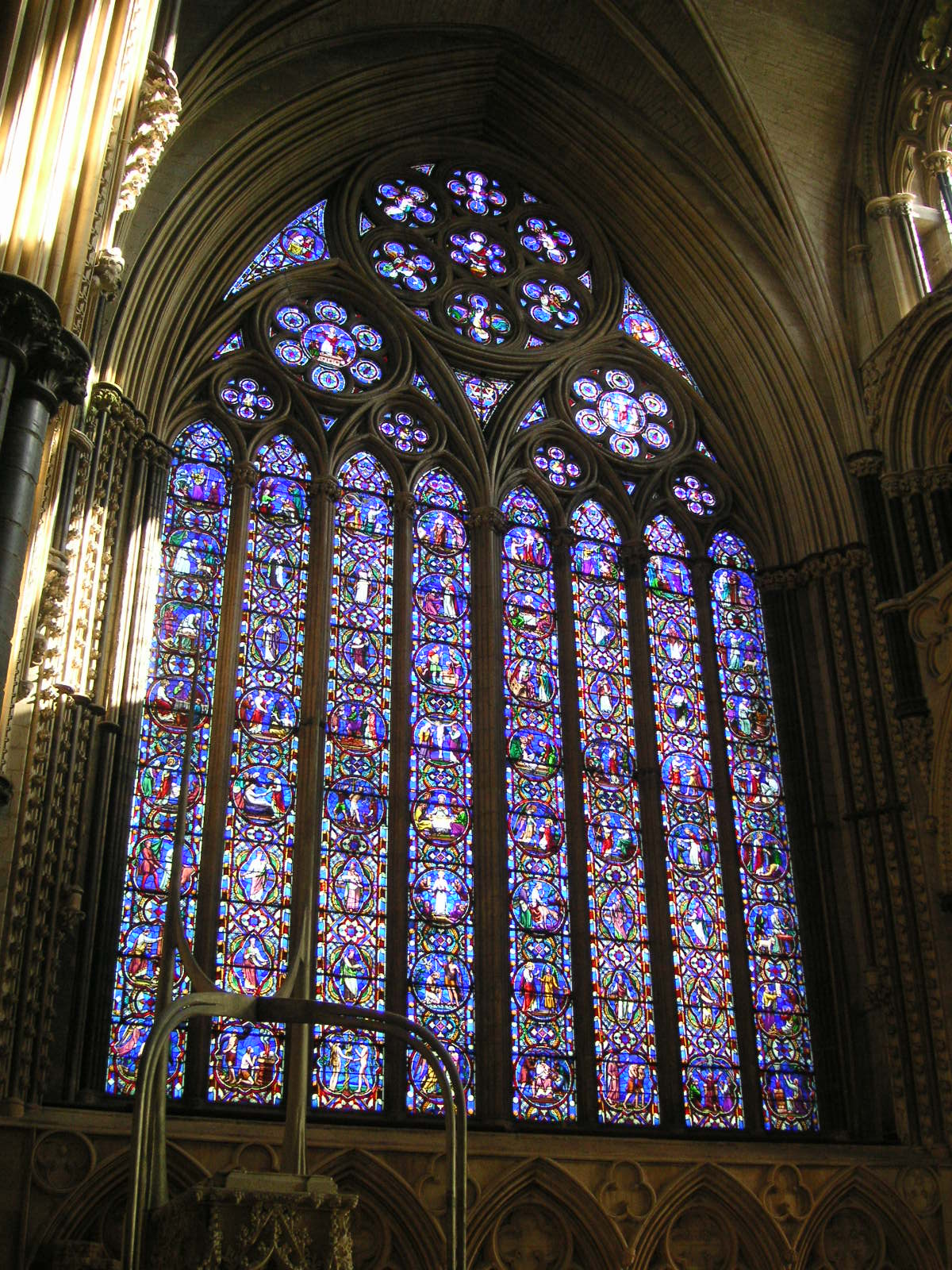
The East Window of Lincoln Cathedral, Ward and Nixon (1855)

James Henry Nixon (1802–1857) was an illustrator and painter during the Victorian period, who worked in the firm Ward and Nixon painting stained glass windows. James Henry Nixon was a protégé of Charles Winston, who praised Nixon's work at Westminster Abbey and Church of Christ the King, Bloomsbury. The company Ward and Nixon was followed by Ward and Hughes.

== Career ==
The company began in 1836 as Ward and Nixon, when James Henry Nixon (brother of sculptor Samuel Nixon) joined forces with Thomas Ward. Nixon was a student of the painter John Martin.

From 1826 to 1829, Nixon painted a replacement of the stained glass at the medieval parish church of St Neot, Cornwall. After that, Nixon exhibited his works at the Royal Academy from 1830 to 1847. In 1832, he exhibited "Solomon's sacrifice at the Dedication of the Temple" to outstanding reviews, and the following year he exhibited "The resting of the Ark in the River Jordan". He painted a window at the New Lady chapel in Southwark Cathedral in 1832. Nixon also illustrated the work of Sir Walter Scott (1835). Ward and Nixon created two windows for the St Edmund, King and Martyr Church in the City of London. They also created a stained-glass window for St Martin's Church, in Owston Ferry, Lincolnshire, in 1836.

Ward and Nixon's studio was at 67 Frith Street, Soho. They created a large window for St Stephen Coleman Street, in the City of London (destroyed in 1940). They were also commissioned to create windows for the south transept of Westminster Abbey from 1844 to 1848; the windows were removed in 1902. Charles Winston wrote:

"... the superiority of this work over its contemporaries, both here and abroad, that, had Mr. Nixon done nothing else, it would have been sufficient to entitle him to the respect of those who desire to see the true revival of a neglected and underrated branch of art."

In 1848, Thomas Ward died at age 71 and his part of the business was taken over by his nephew of the same name.

James Henry Nixon died in 1857 and was buried in Highgate Cemetery. His pupil, Henry Hughes, became the partner of Thomas Ward, and the business was renamed Ward and Hughes.

== Gallery ==
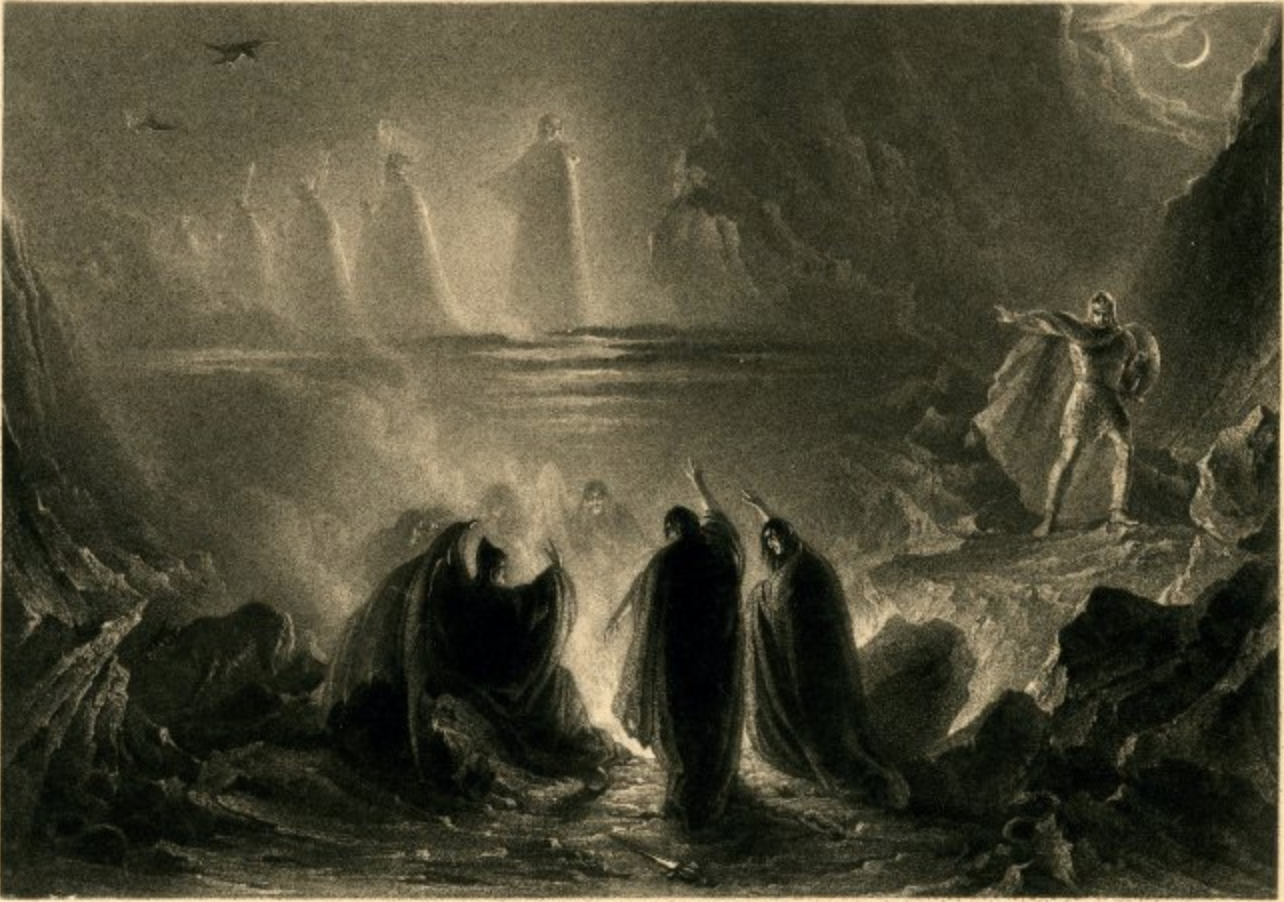
Three Witches, MacBeth, by James Henry Nixon, British Museum (1831)

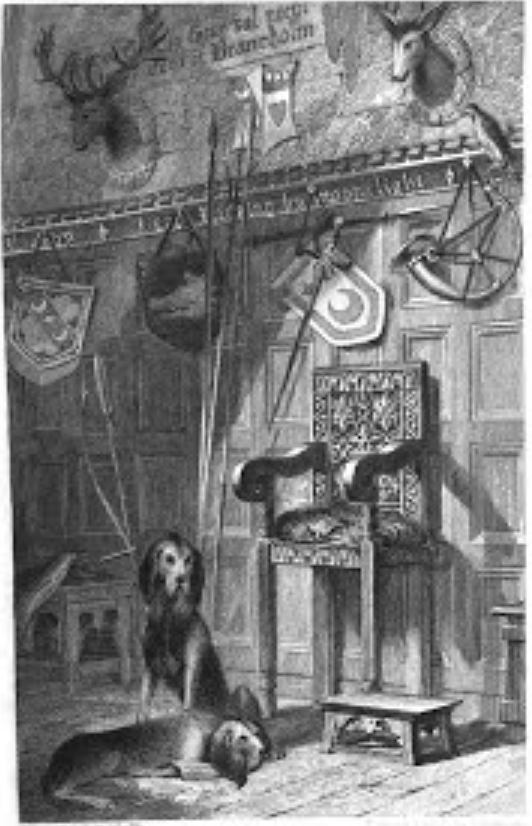
Hall of Branksome, The lay of the last minstrel by Sir Walter Scott, illustration by James Henry Nixon (1835)

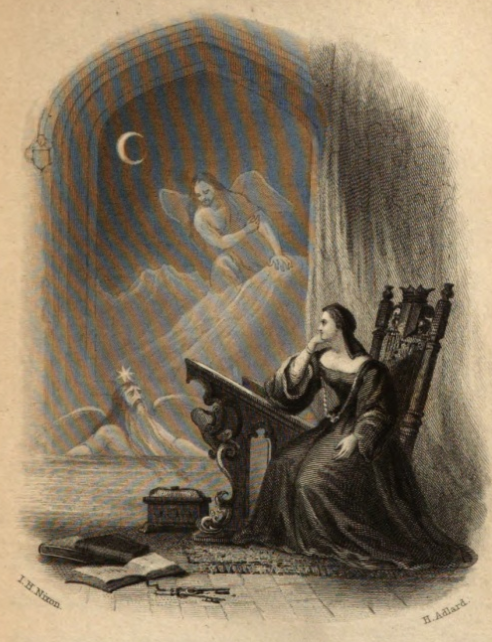
The lay of the last minstrel by Sir Walter Scott, illustration by James Henry Nixon (1835)

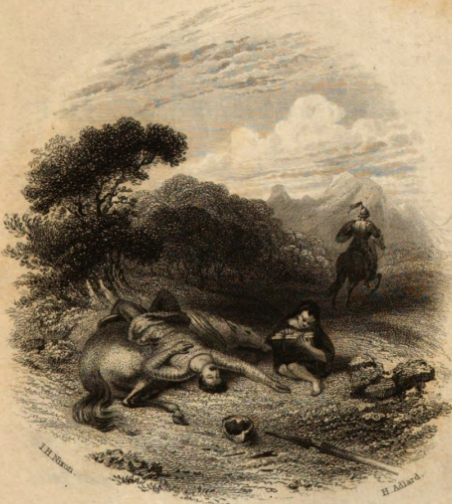
The Lay of the Last Minstrel - by Sir Walter Scott, Illustrated by James Henry Nixon (1835)

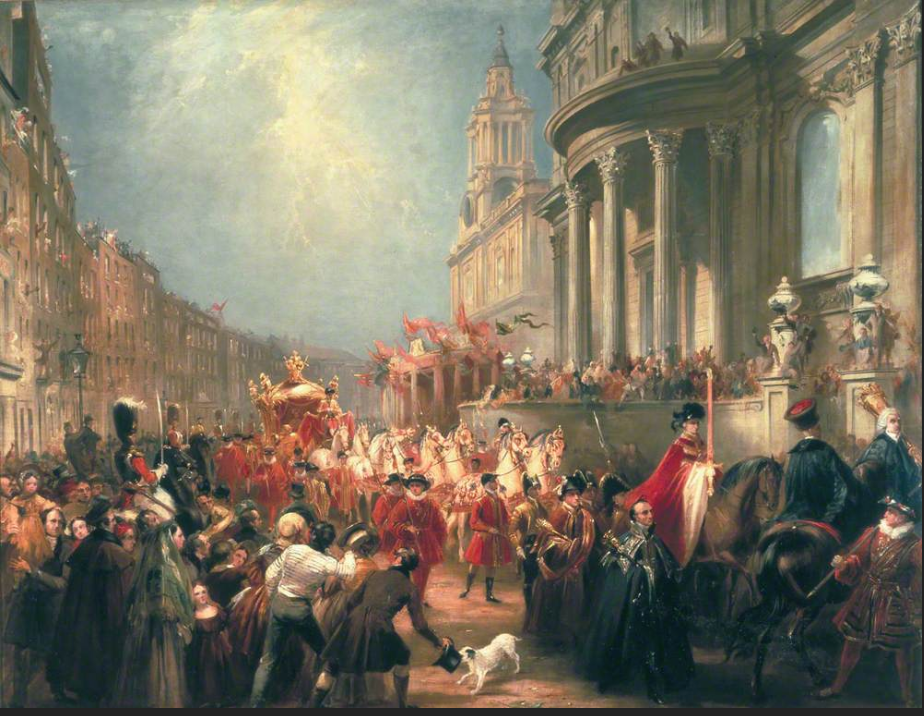
Queen Victoria's Procession to Goldsmiths' Hall by James H. Nixon (1838)

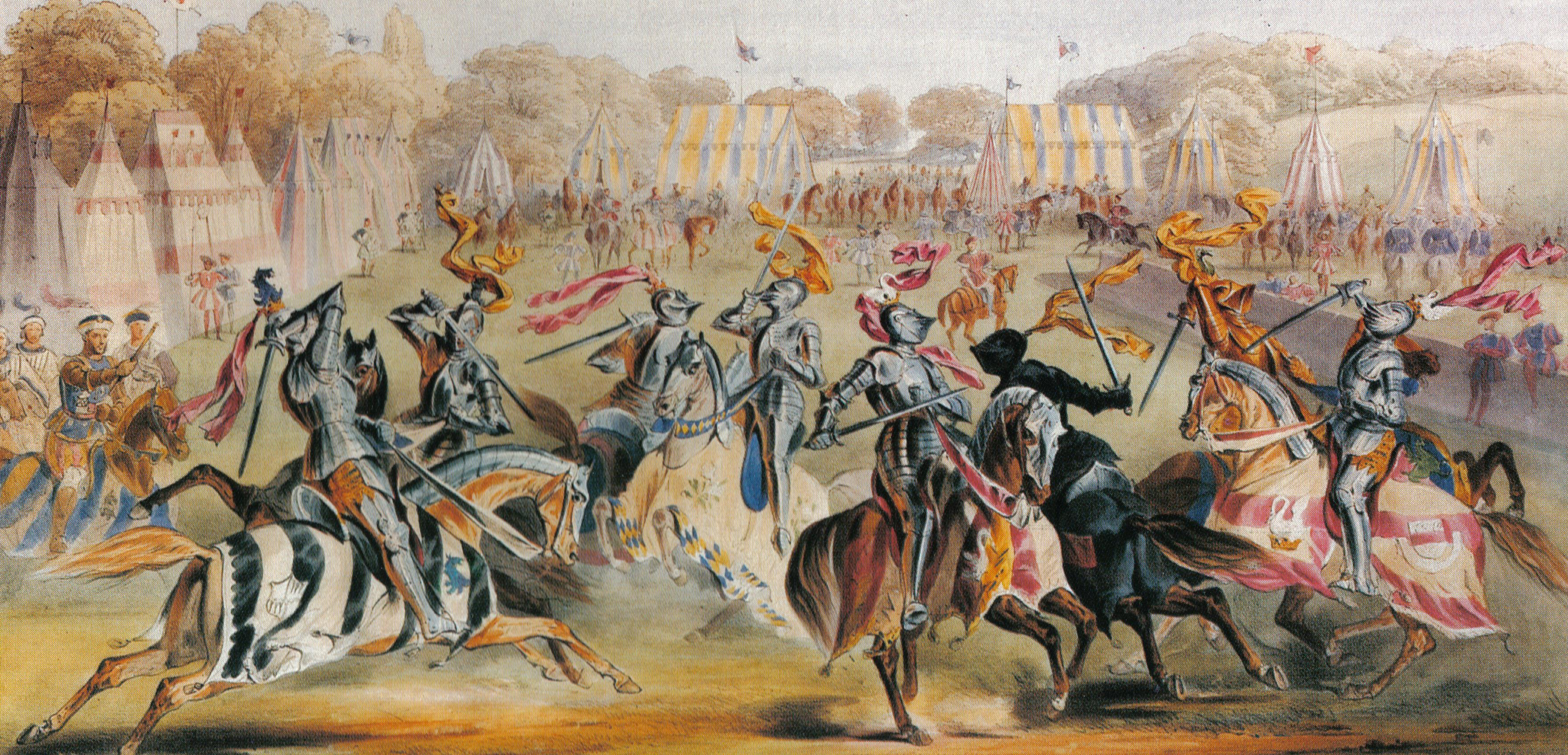
Eglinton Tournament of 1839 by James Henry Nixon in 1839

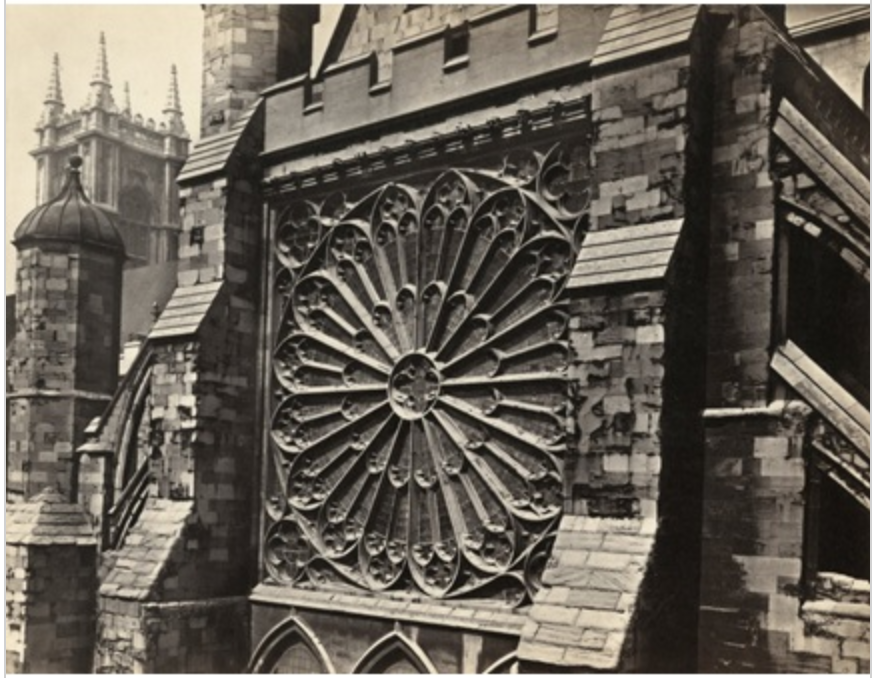
Westminster Abbey, London - the south transept rose window by Ward and Nixon (1844–1848)

== Works by Nixon ==
- St Mary Denton, Norfolk
- North-East Lincolnshire, Owston Ferry, Isle of Axholme (1836)
- two east stained glass windows for St Mary's Church, Eastwell, Kent that represent the events in the history of Christ and Mary (1846).
- Resurrection windows at Church of the Assumption of the Blessed Virgin Mary, Redenhall (1846).
- window for St James' Church, Stert, Wiltshire (1846).
- windows for the church at Homerton, London (1846).
- window for Church of St John-at-Hackney (1847).
- St. Mary, Thorpe, Surrey (1847).
- St Illogan, Illogan, Cornwall (1847).
- two eastern windows for the parish church of St. George, Guiana (1848).
- Chichester Cathedral (1848).
- St Paul's Church, Shadwell (1848).
- Church of St John-at-Hackney (1848).
- windows to Norwich Cathedral (1851).
- St. Paul's, Shadwell (1851).
- All Saints Cathedral, Kingston (1852).
- Glass for St Giles' Catholic Church, Cheadle (1853).
- Benefield (1853).
- Windows at St Nicholas Church, Brighton (1854).
- two memorial windows for Armagh Cathedral (1855).
- St. Andrews Church, Tur Langton, Leicestershire (1855).
- east window of Lincoln Cathedral (1855).
