= Michael O'Connor (artist) =

Michael O'Connor (1801 – 25 June 1867) was an Irish stained-glass artist based successively in Dublin, Bristol and London. A pupil of Thomas Willement, he developed a Gothic Revival style under the influence of Augustus Pugin, with whom he worked. He acquired a high reputation, and was commissioned to create windows for several cathedrals in England, Wales and Ireland. He is now seen as one of the leading stained-glass artists of his generation working in Britain. His stained-glass firm survived his death, initially under the management of his sons, and lasted until 1915.

== Career ==
Michael O'Connor, born in Dublin, began his professional life as a heraldic artist, but along with many other early 19th-century practitioners of that art he decided to move into the renascent field of stained-glass design. Going to London in 1823, he studied this art under Thomas Willement, one of the leaders of the revival of stained-glass manufacture in Britain, and then returned to Dublin to establish his own business. In an 1839 trade directory he is listed as a "professor of heraldry, stained glass enameller, and ornamental painter, print & bookseller, and fancy stationer". He exhibited stained-glass designs at this time at the Royal Hibernian Academy.

He moved his business to Bristol in 1842, and there began to work with Augustus Pugin, under whose influence he adopted a neo-medieval style later to be praised by Pevsner for its avoidance of "Victorian dimness and fussiness of small detail". One of their notable collaborations was on the glass for St Saviour's Church, Leeds.

In 1845 he made his final move, to London, where he set up business premises at 4 Berners Street. O'Connor's collaborators included not just Pugin but William Butterfield, William Warrington, and his own son, Arthur O'Connor, with whom he went into partnership by 1852. By the 1850s he had acquired a high reputation, and was selected for inclusion in the Great Exhibition of 1851. He nevertheless, as a Catholic, suffered from religious prejudice which hindered his efforts to get commissions from the Church of England authorities for prestigious projects, and resulted in 1862 in the firm's newly installed windows for the Anglican church in Enniskerry, St Patrick's, being smashed by Protestant demonstrators. The firm did, however, make windows during and after Michael O'Connor's lifetime for the Royal Chapel of All Saints, Christchurch Priory, Peterborough Cathedral, Salisbury Cathedral, Llandaff Cathedral (the glass was destroyed by enemy action in 1941), Tuam Cathedral, Chichester Cathedral, Clontarf Castle, and the chapels of the Royal Hospital Kilmainham, Balliol College, Oxford, and Eton College.

In 1856 O'Connor developed problems with his eyesight which increasingly necessitated his assigning work to his sons Arthur and William Henry. The style of the firm's glass can be seen to have changed at about this time, losing much of Michael O'Connor's simplicity. Forced to retire by failing health, O'Connor died on 25 June 1867.

== Later history of the company ==
O'Connor's sons William Henry and Arthur continued the firm successfully after his death, expanding their activities into the field of painting as well as continuing the design of stained-glass windows. By 1873, the year Arthur died, the company had changed its name from O'Connor and Sons to O'Connor and Taylor. The new partner, William George Taylor, was perhaps brought in more for his business expertise than for artistic talent. In 1877 the name changed again to Taylor and O'Connor. It adopted its final name, Taylor and Clifton, in 1902, and continued in business until 1915.

== List of works ==
- St. Botolph's Church, Grimston, Norfolk (Saint Paul before Herod Agrippa, 1851)
- St. Margaret's Church, Little Dunham, Norfolk (the crucifixion of Jesus)
