= Charles Winston =

English historian of stained glass

Charles Winston (10 March 1814 – 3 October 1864) was an English historian of stained glass.

== Early life ==
Winston was born in 1814 in Lymington, Hampshire. His father, Reverend Benjamin Winston, was the rector of the parish of Farningham in Kent, and his mother, Helen, was the daughter of Sir Thomas Reid, Baronet. His parents had one other son, who was younger. As Helen died during Winston's early childhood, Winston was raised by his paternal grandmother Mrs Sandford and educated at home.

== Legal career ==
At the age of 21, Winston began his legal career in the Inner Temple, as the pupil of Samuel Warren and William Twopenny. He was called to the Bar in 1845 and practised law until 1864. During this time, he acted as a deputy judge in a few county courts, such as Staffordshire.

== Historical career ==
Outside of his legal career, Winston became known as an expert in stained glass, particularly as a result of his 1847 work, An inquiry into the difference of style observable in ancient glass paintings especially in England, with hints on glass painting. He acted as a consultant for stained glass windows in various churches and cathedrals, including Norwich Cathedral, Glasgow Cathedral, St Paul's Cathedral and the Temple Church in London. At the 1862 International Exhibition, he acted as a judge for the stained glass exhibits.

== List of works ==
- "Painted Glass". Archaeological Journal. 1: 14–23. 1845 – via Wikisource.
- An Inquiry into the Differences of Style observable in Ancient Glass Paintings especially in England, with Hints on Glass Painting. (1847)
- An Introduction to the Study of Painted Glass (1849)
- Memoirs illustrative of the Art of Glass-Painting (1865)

== Personal life ==
Winston married Maria Lempriere, from Jersey, on 10 May 1864, after which he retired from his legal practice. He died of heart failure five months later.
