= Listed buildings in Stoke-by-Nayland =

Civil Parish in Suffolk, England

Stoke-by-Nayland is a village and civil parish in the Babergh District of Suffolk, England. It contains 124 listed buildings that are recorded in the National Heritage List for England. Of these two are grade I, five are grade II* and 117 are grade II.

This list is based on the information retrieved online from Historic England.

== Key ==
Grade	Criteria
I	Buildings that are of exceptional interest
II*	Particularly important buildings of more than special interest
II	Buildings that are of special interest

== Listing ==
Name	Grade	Location	Type	Completed (Note: The date given is the date used by Historic England as significant for the initial building or that of an important part in the structure's description.)	Date designated	Grid ref. (Note: The grid reference is based on the British national grid reference system, sometimes known as OSGB36, used by the Ordnance Survey.) Geo-coordinates	Notes	Entry number (Note: The "List Entry Number" is a unique number assigned to each listed building and scheduled monument by Historic England.)	Image	Wikidata
Barn to South of Bobwrights Farmhouse	II				9 February 1978	TM0129236579; 51°59′28″N 0°55′49″E		1033534	Upload Photo	Q26285016
Bobwrights Farmhouse	II				9 February 1978	TM0128336617; 51°59′29″N 0°55′49″E		1200001	Upload Photo	Q26495842
Dovecote at Giffords Hall	II				9 February 1978	TM0188537469; 51°59′56″N 0°56′22″E		1033533	Upload Photo	Q26285015
Giffords Hall	I		house		10 January 1953	TM0180837432; 51°59′55″N 0°56′18″E		1283138	Giffords Hall More images	Q17542271
Poplar Farmhouse	II				10 January 1953	TL9783435969; 51°59′13″N 0°52′47″E		1033532	Upload Photo	Q26285014
Ruined Chapel of St Nicholas	II				10 January 1953	TM0177837339; 51°59′52″N 0°56′16″E		1351897	Upload Photo	Q26634960
The Temple	II				10 January 1953	TL9866035522; 51°58′57″N 0°53′29″E		1199934	Upload Photo	Q26495779
Valley Farmhouse	II				9 February 1978	TM0009136084; 51°59′14″N 0°54′45″E		1351898	Upload Photo	Q26634961
War Memorial in the Churchyard of St Marys Church	II		war memorial		31 May 2001	TL9869836274; 51°59′22″N 0°53′33″E		1246134	War Memorial in the Churchyard of St Marys Church More images	Q26538573
Wasses Farmhouse	II				9 February 1978	TM0267035500; 51°58′52″N 0°56′59″E		1199984	Upload Photo	Q26495826
Wick Farmhouse	II	Boxted Road			10 January 1953	TM0112734876; 51°58′33″N 0°55′37″E		1033535	Upload Photo	Q26285017
Church of Our Lady Immaculate and St Edmund King and Martyr with Attached Former Presbytery	II	Chapel Lane, Withermarsh Green	church building		16 April 2003	TM0143937016; 51°59′42″N 0°55′58″E		1096060	Church of Our Lady Immaculate and St Edmund King and Martyr with Attached Former Presbytery More images	Q26388354
Almshouses	II	Church Lane			9 February 1978	TL9870036328; 51°59′23″N 0°53′33″E		1351899	Upload Photo	Q26634962
Church of St Mary	I	Church Lane	church building		23 March 1961	TL9862836281; 51°59′22″N 0°53′29″E		1200030	Church of St Mary More images	Q15979427
Beech Cottages	II	Church Street			10 January 1953	TL9878236281; 51°59′22″N 0°53′37″E		1033537	Upload Photo	Q26285019
Half Moon Cottage and Shop Adjoining	II	Church Street			10 January 1953	TL9872436273; 51°59′22″N 0°53′34″E		1351900	Upload Photo	Q26634963
Old Reading Room	II	Church Street			23 March 1961	TL9877736248; 51°59′21″N 0°53′37″E		1033539	Upload Photo	Q26285021
Street Cottage	II	Church Street			10 January 1953	TL9880836290; 51°59′22″N 0°53′39″E		1200084	Upload Photo	Q26495919
Street House	II*	Church Street			10 January 1953	TL9879636286; 51°59′22″N 0°53′38″E		1033538	Upload Photo	Q17532734
The Cottage	II	Church Street			10 January 1953	TL9874336211; 51°59′20″N 0°53′35″E		1351901	Upload Photo	Q26685447
The Old Bakehouse and Fenwood	II	Church Street			10 January 1953	TL9881136271; 51°59′21″N 0°53′39″E		1300930	Upload Photo	Q26588202
The Old Vicarage	II	Church Street			9 February 1978	TL9867936234; 51°59′20″N 0°53′32″E		1033536	Upload Photo	Q26285018
The Vicarage	II	Church Street			10 January 1953	TL9874636271; 51°59′22″N 0°53′35″E		1200071	Upload Photo	Q26495906
Tudor Cottage	II	Church Street			10 January 1953	TL9884736282; 51°59′22″N 0°53′41″E		1300937	Upload Photo	Q26588209
Tudor Cottages	II	Church Street			10 January 1953	TL9883736280; 51°59′22″N 0°53′40″E		1033540	Upload Photo	Q26285022
Wall to the North East of the Old Vicarage	II	Church Street			9 February 1978	TL9870636266; 51°59′21″N 0°53′33″E		1200061	Upload Photo	Q26495896
Walled Garden at Giffords Hall	II	Giffords Hall Park, Stoke By Nayland, Colchester, CO6 4SZ			9 August 2023	TM0185737388; 51°59′54″N 0°56′21″E		1481463	Upload Photo	Q126206233
Shaddelows Farmhouse	II	Gravel Hill			9 February 1978	TL9757934814; 51°58′36″N 0°52′31″E		1033499	Upload Photo	Q26284982
Corders	II	Hudsons Lane			9 February 1978	TM0094735763; 51°59′02″N 0°55′30″E		1033500	Upload Photo	Q26284983
Hudsons Cottage	II	Hudsons Lane			9 February 1978	TM0094036237; 51°59′18″N 0°55′30″E		1033501	Upload Photo	Q26284984
Lower House Farmhouse	II	Marsh Road			10 January 1953	TM0237436678; 51°59′30″N 0°56′46″E		1033502	Upload Photo	Q26284985
Crown Cottages	II	Park Street			10 January 1953	TL9886236300; 51°59′22″N 0°53′41″E		1033503	Upload Photo	Q26284987
Grimsey Cottages	II	Park Street			23 March 1961	TL9892136206; 51°59′19″N 0°53′44″E		1351924	Upload Photo	Q26634988
Main Lodge to Tendring Hall Park	II	Park Street			10 January 1953	TL9893436181; 51°59′18″N 0°53′45″E		1200248	Upload Photo	Q26496066
Outbuilding at the Rear of the Cottage	II	Park Street			9 February 1978	TL9890036216; 51°59′20″N 0°53′43″E		1033507	Upload Photo	Q26284991
Park House	II	Park Street			23 March 1961	TL9889036245; 51°59′21″N 0°53′43″E		1351923	Upload Photo	Q26634987
Park Street Cottages	II	Park Street			23 March 1961	TL9889936235; 51°59′20″N 0°53′43″E		1033506	Upload Photo	Q26284990
Park Street Stores	II	Park Street			10 January 1953	TL9886536270; 51°59′21″N 0°53′42″E		1033505	Upload Photo	Q26284989
The Corner House and the Open Road Bookshop	II	Park Street, Stoke By Nayland, CO6 4SE			10 January 1953	TL9885836308; 51°59′23″N 0°53′41″E		1351921	Upload Photo	Q26634985
The Cottage	II	Park Street			23 March 1961	TL9890836222; 51°59′20″N 0°53′44″E		1300848	Upload Photo	Q26588125
The Crown Inn	II	Park Street	pub		10 January 1953	TL9888436300; 51°59′22″N 0°53′43″E		1033504	The Crown Inn More images	Q26284988
The White House	II	Park Street			10 January 1953	TL9885436281; 51°59′22″N 0°53′41″E		1351922	Upload Photo	Q26634986
7-12, Polstead Street	II	7-12, Polstead Street			9 February 1978	TL9879936444; 51°59′27″N 0°53′38″E		1033510	Upload Photo	Q26284994
Alde House	II	Polstead Street			10 January 1953	TL9876536473; 51°59′28″N 0°53′37″E		1033512	Upload Photo	Q26284997
Almond House	II	Polstead Street, Stoke By Nayland, CO6 4SA			9 February 1978	TL9881436427; 51°59′27″N 0°53′39″E		1200272	Upload Photo	Q26496088
Angel Inn	II	Polstead Street	inn		10 January 1953	TL9882436308; 51°59′23″N 0°53′40″E		1200277	Angel Inn More images	Q26496091
Assur	II	Polstead Street			9 February 1978	TL9881536405; 51°59′26″N 0°53′39″E		1033509	Upload Photo	Q26284993
Black Horse Inn	II	Polstead Street			10 January 1953	TL9883236355; 51°59′24″N 0°53′40″E		1033508	Upload Photo	Q26284992
Clip Bush Cottages	II	Polstead Street			9 February 1978	TL9873036601; 51°59′32″N 0°53′35″E		1300833	Upload Photo	Q26588112
Dickhill Cottage	II	Polstead Street			9 February 1978	TL9881836396; 51°59′26″N 0°53′39″E		1300858	Upload Photo	Q26588134
Holly Tree Cottage	II	Polstead Street			9 February 1978	TL9882136375; 51°59′25″N 0°53′39″E		1351925	Upload Photo	Q26634989
Oak Bough	II	Polstead Street			9 February 1978	TL9881036354; 51°59′24″N 0°53′39″E		1351927	Upload Photo	Q26634991
Postboys	II	Polstead Street			10 January 1953	TL9879936384; 51°59′25″N 0°53′38″E		1200286	Upload Photo	Q26496100
The Stables	II	Polstead Street			9 February 1978	TL9880636342; 51°59′24″N 0°53′39″E		1033511	Upload Photo	Q26284995
Gads Hill	II	Polstead Streetnd			9 February 1978	TL9878236476; 51°59′28″N 0°53′38″E		1351926	Upload Photo	Q26634990
White Horse Cottage	II	3, School Street			9 February 1978	TL9846736459; 51°59′28″N 0°53′21″E		1351928	Upload Photo	Q26634992
Drift Cottage	II	School Street			9 February 1978	TL9856036276; 51°59′22″N 0°53′26″E		1033515	Upload Photo	Q26284999
Lavender Cottage	II	School Street			9 February 1978	TL9852436368; 51°59′25″N 0°53′24″E		1033514	Upload Photo	Q26284998
St Anthony's Cottage Walnut Tree Cottage	II	School Street			9 February 1978	TL9853436350; 51°59′24″N 0°53′24″E		1200346	Upload Photo	Q26496152
St Hughs Cottage and the Cottage	II	School Street, Stoke By Nayland, CO6 4QT			9 February 1978	TL9854936308; 51°59′23″N 0°53′25″E		1351890	Upload Photo	Q26634953
St Mary's Cottage	II	School Street			9 February 1978	TL9856136233; 51°59′21″N 0°53′26″E		1351891	Upload Photo	Q26634954
Stoke by Nayland Primary School	II	School Street			9 February 1978	TL9850036402; 51°59′26″N 0°53′23″E		1200343	Upload Photo	Q26496150
The Maltings	II*	School Street	architectural structure		23 March 1961	TL9856836306; 51°59′23″N 0°53′26″E		1033513	The Maltings More images	Q17532700
The Old Guildhall Tudor Cottages	II*	School Street	cottage		10 January 1953	TL9856536258; 51°59′21″N 0°53′26″E		1200348	The Old Guildhall Tudor Cottages More images	Q17534036
Barn to South of Scotland Hall	II	Scotland Street			9 February 1978	TL9983536824; 51°59′38″N 0°54′34″E		1033474	Upload Photo	Q26284955
Barn to West of Scotland Place	II	Scotland Street			17 June 1988	TL9958636733; 51°59′35″N 0°54′20″E		1244713	Upload Photo	Q26537303
Bishops	II	Scotland Street			9 February 1978	TL9938136636; 51°59′33″N 0°54′09″E		1351911	Upload Photo	Q26634974
Cart Lodge to North West of Scotland Place	II	Scotland Street			17 June 1988	TL9955736788; 51°59′37″N 0°54′19″E		1272238	Upload Photo	Q26562105
Cherry Trees	II	Scotland Street			9 February 1978	TL9928436560; 51°59′30″N 0°54′04″E		1033479	Upload Photo	Q26284960
Dovecote Immediately North East of Scotland Place	II	Scotland Street			9 February 1978	TL9965636773; 51°59′37″N 0°54′24″E		1033519	Upload Photo	Q26285003
Hillside	II	Scotland Street			9 February 1978	TL9941136657; 51°59′33″N 0°54′11″E		1033518	Upload Photo	Q26285002
Homestead	II	Scotland Street			9 February 1978	TL9923236496; 51°59′28″N 0°54′01″E		1033476	Upload Photo	Q26284957
Honeycroft	II	Scotland Street			9 February 1978	TL9927236547; 51°59′30″N 0°54′03″E		1033478	Upload Photo	Q26284959
Lilac Cottages	II	Scotland Street			9 February 1978	TL9924736515; 51°59′29″N 0°54′02″E		1033477	Upload Photo	Q26284958
Lower Fen	II	Scotland Street, Stoke By Nayland, CO6 4QD			9 February 1978	TL9938436674; 51°59′34″N 0°54′10″E		1033517	Upload Photo	Q26285001
Maltings Cottage	II	Scotland Street			9 February 1978	TL9963636674; 51°59′33″N 0°54′23″E		1033482	Upload Photo	Q26284964
Oak Beams	II	Scotland Street			9 February 1978	TL9934436622; 51°59′32″N 0°54′07″E		1033480	Upload Photo	Q26284961
Outbuilding to Bishops	II	Scotland Street			9 February 1978	TL9939736638; 51°59′33″N 0°54′10″E		1033481	Upload Photo	Q26284963
Scotland Hall	II	Scotland Street			9 February 1978	TL9978736950; 51°59′42″N 0°54′31″E		1300763	Upload Photo	Q26588043
Scotland House	II	Scotland Street			9 February 1978	TL9972636765; 51°59′36″N 0°54′28″E		1351912	Upload Photo	Q26634975
Scotland Place	II	Scotland Street			10 January 1953	TL9962836744; 51°59′36″N 0°54′23″E		1200445	Upload Photo	Q26496245
Thatchers Cottage	II	Scotland Street			9 February 1978	TL9909636463; 51°59′27″N 0°53′54″E		1033475	Upload Photo	Q26284956
Mead House	II	Scotland Street Stoke-by-nayland			9 February 1978	TL9908936483; 51°59′28″N 0°53′54″E		1033516	Upload Photo	Q26285000
Ridgeway Cottage	II	Scotland Street Stoke-by-nayland			9 February 1978	TL9938536653; 51°59′33″N 0°54′10″E		1300749	Upload Photo	Q26588031
Well House	II	Sudbury Road			9 February 1978	TL9847736482; 51°59′29″N 0°53′22″E		1033485	Upload Photo	Q26284967
Holly Cottage	II	Sudbury Ry Road			9 February 1978	TL9845336475; 51°59′29″N 0°53′20″E		1200526	Upload Photo	Q26496318
Portico to Former Tendering Hall	II	Tendering Hall Park			19 March 1979	TL9920135753; 51°59′04″N 0°53′58″E		1033460	Upload Photo	Q26284941
Dovecote	II	Tendring Hall Park			9 February 1978	TL9938635611; 51°58′59″N 0°54′07″E		1351914	Upload Photo	Q26634977
Garden Wall to Hill House	II	The Downs			9 February 1978	TL9867436134; 51°59′17″N 0°53′31″E		1033498	Upload Photo	Q26284981
Hill House	II	The Downs			9 February 1978	TL9866936152; 51°59′18″N 0°53′31″E		1033497	Upload Photo	Q26284980
Houses About 24 Yards North East of the Downs Almshouses	II	The Downs			9 February 1978	TL9870736080; 51°59′15″N 0°53′33″E		1033542	Upload Photo	Q26285025
The Downs Almshouses	II	The Downs			9 February 1978	TL9868436055; 51°59′15″N 0°53′32″E		1033541	Upload Photo	Q26285024
The Downs Farmhouse	II*	The Downs			9 February 1978	TL9863436054; 51°59′15″N 0°53′29″E		1200113	Upload Photo	Q17534025
Ores Barn Cottage	II	1 and 2, Thorington Street			23 March 1961	TM0110835331; 51°58′48″N 0°55′37″E		1351915	Upload Photo	Q26634978
Albys	II	Thorington Street			9 February 1978	TM0102935541; 51°58′55″N 0°55′33″E		1300651	Upload Photo	Q26587939
Barn Immediately South East of Nether Hall Farmhouse	II	Thorington Street			9 February 1978	TM0170235449; 51°58′51″N 0°56′08″E		1351916	Upload Photo	Q26634980
Cat Barn	II	Thorington Street			16 February 1976	TM0106235416; 51°58′51″N 0°55′35″E		1033490	Upload Photo	Q26284973
Corn Mill	II	Thorington Street			9 February 1978	TM0119635614; 51°58′57″N 0°55′42″E		1033491	Upload Photo	Q26284974
Garden Wall	II	Thorington Street			9 February 1978	TM0128335438; 51°58′51″N 0°55′46″E		1033487	Upload Photo	Q26284969
K6 Telephone Kiosk	II	Thorington Street			24 May 1993	TM0109435339; 51°58′48″N 0°55′36″E		1351947	Upload Photo	Q26635009
Mill House	II	Thorington Street			9 February 1978	TM0118335616; 51°58′57″N 0°55′42″E		1033492	Upload Photo	Q26284975
Nether Hall Farmhouse	II	Thorington Street			9 February 1978	TM0168335460; 51°58′52″N 0°56′07″E		1200611	Upload Photo	Q26496396
Old Forge House	II	Thorington Street			9 February 1978	TM0104635316; 51°58′48″N 0°55′34″E		1300687	Upload Photo	Q26587974
Outbuildings South to Thorington Hall	II	Thorington Street			10 January 1953	TM0133835430; 51°58′51″N 0°55′49″E		1033488	Upload Photo	Q26284971
Rose Inn	II	Thorington Street			9 February 1978	TM0104035340; 51°58′48″N 0°55′33″E		1033486	Upload Photo	Q26284968
Stables West of Thorington House	II	Thorington Street			9 February 1978	TM0110235430; 51°58′51″N 0°55′37″E		1351917	Upload Photo	Q26634981
The Rosary	II	Thorington Street			9 February 1978	TM0108535458; 51°58′52″N 0°55′36″E		1300648	Upload Photo	Q26587936
Thorington Hall	II*	Thorington Street	country house		10 January 1953	TM0131235465; 51°58′52″N 0°55′48″E		1200597	Thorington Hall More images	Q17534048
Thorington House	II	Thorington Street			9 February 1978	TM0115035427; 51°58′51″N 0°55′39″E		1033489	Upload Photo	Q26284972
Wall to Thorington House	II	Thorington Street			9 February 1978	TM0117435380; 51°58′50″N 0°55′41″E		1200617	Upload Photo	Q26496401
Wren Cottage and Danbury Cottage	II	Thorington Street			9 February 1978	TM0103435519; 51°58′54″N 0°55′34″E		1351918	Upload Photo	Q26634982
Cobbs Cottage	II	Tye Road, Stoke By Nayland, CO6 4RP			9 February 1978	TL9792737641; 52°00′07″N 0°52′55″E		1033484	Upload Photo	Q26284966
Jums Cottage and Riches Cottage	II	Tye Road, Stoke By Nayland, Colchester, CO6 4RP			9 February 1978	TL9790937646; 52°00′07″N 0°52′54″E		1200516	Upload Photo	Q26496309
Lilleys Cottage	II	Tye Road, Stoke By Nayland, Colchester, CO6 4RP			9 February 1978	TL9789337641; 52°00′07″N 0°52′54″E		1351913	Upload Photo	Q26634976
Louies Cottage	II	Tye Road, Stoke By Nayland, CO6 4RP			9 February 1978	TL9790637607; 52°00′06″N 0°52′54″E		1033483	Upload Photo	Q26284965
Grove Farmhouse	II	Wick Road			10 January 1953	TM0066735112; 51°58′42″N 0°55′13″E		1200651	Upload Photo	Q26496434
April Cottage	II	Withermarsh Green, Stoke By Nayland, CO6 4TD			9 February 1978	TM0097636973; 51°59′41″N 0°55′34″E		1351920	Upload Photo	Q26634984
Barn to the North of Green Farmhouse	II	Withermarsh Green			9 February 1978	TM0096437043; 51°59′44″N 0°55′33″E		1033495	Upload Photo	Q26284979
Brick House	II	Withermarsh Green, Stoke By Nayland, CO6 4TD			9 February 1978	TM0096836971; 51°59′41″N 0°55′33″E		1033493	Upload Photo	Q26284976
Green Farmhouse	II	Withermarsh Green			9 February 1978	TM0097937008; 51°59′42″N 0°55′34″E		1033494	Upload Photo	Q26284977
Pond Cottage	II	Withermarsh Green			9 February 1978	TM0092636966; 51°59′41″N 0°55′31″E		1200672	Upload Photo	Q26496452
Round House Farmhouse	II	Withermarsh Green			9 February 1978	TM0063136868; 51°59′38″N 0°55′15″E		1351919	Upload Photo	Q26634983
Thatched Cottage	II	Withermarsh Green, Stoke By Nayland, CO6 4TA			23 March 1961	TM0112637030; 51°59′43″N 0°55′42″E		1200685	Upload Photo	Q26496465
Thatched Cottage East	II	Withermarsh Green, Stoke By Nayland, CO6 4TA	thatched cottage		23 March 1961	TM0114637020; 51°59′43″N 0°55′43″E		1033496	Thatched Cottage East More images	Q17541587

== See also ==
- Grade I listed buildings in Suffolk
- Grade II* listed buildings in Suffolk

== Sources ==
- Bettely, James; Pevsner, Nikolaus (2015) [1961], Suffolk: West, The Buildings of England, New Haven and London: Yale University Press, ISBN 978-0-300-19655-9
