= 2009 Suffolk County Council election =

2009 UK local government election

- 4 June 2009

All 75 seats in the Suffolk County Council 38 seats needed for a majority

	First party	Second party	Third party
Leader	Jeremy Pembroke	Kathy Pollard	Bryony Rudkin
Party	Conservative	Liberal Democrats	Labour
Leader since	2002	May 2005	May 2003
Leader's seat	Cosford	Belstead Brook	Chantry (Contested Bridge)
Last election	45 seats, 39.2%	7 seats, 26.3%	22 seats, 27.8%
Seats before	43	9	21
Seats won	55	11	4
Seat change	▲11	▲2	▼17
Popular vote	91,617	51,106	28,278
Percentage	44.1%	24.6%	13.6%
Swing	▲4.9%	▼1.7%	▼14.2%
	Fourth party	Fifth party	Sixth party
Party	Green	Independent	UKIP
Last election	0 seats, 2.2%	1 seats, 2.8%	0 seats, 1.6%
Seats before	0	1	0
Seats won	2	2	1
Seat change	▲2	▲1	▲1
Popular vote	17,233	6,531	9,393
Percentage	8.3%	3.1%	4.5%
Swing	▲6.1%	▲0.3%	▲2.9%
- Map of the results of the 2009 Suffolk council election. Conservatives in blue, Liberal Democrats in yellow, Labour in red, Greens in green, independent in grey and UK Independence Party in purple.
Council control before election
Conservative
Council control after election
Conservative

Elections to Suffolk County Council were held on 4 June 2009 as part of the 2009 United Kingdom local elections on the same day as the elections to the European Parliament. 75 councillors were elected from 63 electoral divisions, which returned either one or two county councillors each by first-past-the-post voting for a four-year term of office. The electoral divisions were the same as those used at the previous election in 2005.

Labour and the Conservatives were the only parties with candidates standing in all sixty-three electoral divisions. The Liberal Democrats and the Green Party were the only other parties which fielded enough candidates to achieve a majority.

All locally registered electors (British, Irish, Commonwealth and European Union citizens) who were aged 18 or over on Thursday 4 June 2009 were entitled to vote in the local elections. Those who were temporarily away from their ordinary address (for example, away working, on holiday, in student accommodation or in hospital) were also entitled to vote in the local elections, although those who had moved abroad and registered as overseas electors cannot vote in the local elections. It is possible to register to vote at more than one address (such as a university student who had a term-time address and lives at home during holidays) at the discretion of the local Electoral Register Office, but it remains an offence to vote more than once in the same local government election.

== Summary ==
The Conservatives won the election, being returned to power with 55 seats, a net gain of eleven, while the Liberal Democrats won eleven (a gain of two) and thus replaced Labour as the main opposition party, Labour losing seventeen seats overall and ending with only four. Two Independents were elected, while the Green Party also won two seats and the UK Independence Party won one.

The Conservatives became more representative of the county's urban areas, particularly in Waveney and Ipswich, where they took seats from Labour. This contrasted with their performance in 2005 being mainly down to piling up votes in rural divisions. That said, the party lost seats in Bury St Edmunds and also in Mid Suffolk. Despite mounting strong challenges in the divisions lost to the Liberal Democrats in subsequent by-elections, they failed to regain them. The party was heartened by almost tripling their majority to thirty nine seats in comparison to the one of fifteen in 2005.

The Liberal Democrats had fought a strong campaign and held all of their divisions and added a further two Councillors to their tally.

The smaller parties benefited from the Expenses Scandal hitting the main parties, which saw the Greens and an Independent gain three divisions from the Conservatives, and the UK Independence party taking a seat from Labour.

Labour itself was left with a severely reduced tally, and returned to Endeavour House with just four Councillors, all from Ipswich. Of these, two were from the Co-Operative Party.

In 2005 the Conservatives had won 42 seats, Labour 22, the Liberal Democrats 7, and one Independent was elected. Subsequent by-elections after this saw the Conservatives gain a seat from Labour, but lose two to the Liberal Democrats.

== Government Formation ==
Conservative group leader Jeremy Pembroke (Cosford) remained as council leader until April 2011, when Mark Bee (Beccles) succeeded him. Lib Dem leader Kathy Pollard (Belstead Brook) became leader of opposition, and Sandy Martin (St John's) became Labour group leader.

== Results ==
2009 Suffolk County Council election
Party	Seats	Gains	Losses	Net gain/loss	Seats %	Votes %	Votes	+/−
Conservative	55	15	4	+11	73.0	44.1	91,617	+4.9
Liberal Democrats	11	2	0	+2	14.7	24.6	51,106	-1.7
Labour	4	0	17	-17	5.3	13.6	28,278	-14.2
Green	2	2	0	+2	2.7	8.3	17,233	+6.1
Independent	2	1	0	+1	2.7	3.4	6,531	+0.3
UKIP	1	1	0	+1	1.4	4.5	9,393	+2.9
Suffolk Together	0	0	0	-	0	1.2	2,583	+1.2
BNP	0	0	0	-	0	0.6	1,182	+0.6

== Results by District ==
=== Babergh ===
District Summary

Party	Seats	+/-	Votes	%	+/-
Conservative	6	▲1	12,244	43.8	+7.4
Liberal Democrat	3	Steady	9,483	33.9	+2.1
Independent	1	Steady	2,159	7.7	+1.5
Labour	0	▼1	2,616	9.4	−14.4
UKIP	0	Steady	1,068	3.8	+2.1
Green	0	Steady	410	1.5	+1.5

Division Results

Belstead Brook
Party	Candidate	Votes	%	±%
Liberal Democrats	Kathy Pollard *	1,182	50.0	+6.2
Conservative	Gerald White	948	40.1	+5.1
Labour	Roger Fern	235	9.9	−11.3
Majority		234	9.9	+1.1
Turnout		2,389	36.2	−28.8
Registered electors		6,607		
Liberal Democrats hold		Swing	+0.5	

Cosford
Party	Candidate	Votes	%	±%
Conservative	Jeremy Pembroke *	1,933	64.5	+13.9
Liberal Democrats	Duncan Read	815	27.2	−1.9
Labour	Steve Buckingham	250	8.3	−12.0
Majority		1,118	37.3	+15.8
Turnout		3,046	45.1	−27.9
Registered electors		6,757		
Conservative hold		Swing	+7.9	

Great Cornard
Party	Candidate	Votes	%	±%
Conservative	Peter Beer *	1,067	56.4	+16.2
Liberal Democrats	Oliver Forder	577	30.5	+5.3
Labour	Kevin Craig	248	13.1	−21.6
Majority		490	25.9	+20.4
Turnout		1,933	30.1	−30.5
Registered electors		6,415		
Conservative hold		Swing	+5.5	

Hadleigh
Party	Candidate	Votes	%	±%
Liberal Democrats	David Grutchfield *	971	44.4	−1.7
Conservative	Brian Riley	880	40.3	+19.8
Labour	Keith Grimsey	335	15.3	−14.1
Majority		91	4.2	−12.5
Turnout		2,211	34.7	−32.2
Registered electors		6,376		
Liberal Democrats hold		Swing	−10.8	

Melford
Party	Candidate	Votes	%	±%
Independent	Richard Kemp *	2,159	68.0	+18.5
Conservative	Richard Wade	828	26.1	−5.2
Labour	Kimberley Cook	188	5.9	−13.3
Majority		1,331	41.9	+23.7
Turnout		3,198	41.3	−27.9
Registered electors		7,750		
Independent hold		Swing	+11.9	

Peninsula
Party	Candidate	Votes	%	±%
Liberal Democrats	David Wood *	1,941	56.5	+7.7
Conservative	Peter Burgoyne	1,236	36.0	+3.7
Labour	Keith Rawlings	257	7.5	−11.3
Majority		705	20.5	+4.0
Turnout		3,463	43.3	−29.9
Registered electors		7,990		
Liberal Democrats hold		Swing	+2.0	

Samford
Party	Candidate	Votes	%	±%
Conservative	David Yorke-Edwards *	1,653	44.5	+4.6
Liberal Democrats	Sue Carpendale	1,455	39.1	+2.4
Green	Miriam Burns	410	11.0	+11.0
Labour	Keith Herod	200	5.4	−12.5
Majority		198	5.3	+2.1
Turnout		3,746	48.0	−28.8
Registered electors		7,812		
Conservative hold		Swing	+1.1	

Stour Valley
Party	Candidate	Votes	%	±%
Conservative	James Finch	1,416	41.9	−4.6
Liberal Democrats	Bryn Hurren	1,371	40.6	+3.5
UKIP	James Carver	477	14.1	+14.1
Labour	Alex Mayer	114	3.4	−13.1
Majority		45	1.3	−8.1
Turnout		3,387	55.0	−19.7
Registered electors		6,159		
Conservative hold		Swing	−4.0	

Sudbury
Party	Candidate	Votes	%	±%
Conservative	John Sayers	1,048	44.7	+18.3
Liberal Democrats	Andrew Welsh	790	33.7	+4.0
Labour	Jack Owen *	506	21.6	−14.3
Majority		258	11.0	+4.9
Turnout		2,392	35.0	−25.5
Registered electors		6,838		
Conservative gain from Labour		Swing	+16.3	

Sudbury East and Waldingfield
Party	Candidate	Votes	%	±%
Conservative	Colin Spence *	1,235	49.6	+11.0
UKIP	Leon Stedman	591	23.7	+16.3
Liberal Democrats	Emma Hewett	381	15.3	−5.5
Labour	Simon Clarke	283	11.4	−21.7
Majority		644	25.9	+20.3
Turnout		2,501	37.7	−27.5
Registered electors		6,635		
Conservative hold		Swing	−2.7	

=== Forest Heath ===
District Summary

Party	Seats	+/-	Votes	%	+/-
Conservative	5	Steady	5,624	47.1	+4.0
UKIP	0	Steady	3,065	25.7	+19.2
Liberal Democrat	0	Steady	2,139	17.9	+1.9
Labour	0	Steady	1,112	9.3	−15.5

Division Results

Brandon
Party	Candidate	Votes	%	±%
Conservative	William Bishop *	1,137	52.8	−0.5
UKIP	Reg Silvester	648	30.1	+23.6
Liberal Democrats	Ian Horner	201	9.3	−3.7
Labour	Stephen Dean	166	7.7	−19.4
Majority		489	22.7	−3.5
Turnout		2,152	32.6	−22.3
Conservative hold		Swing	−12.0	

Exning and Newmarket
Party	Candidate	Votes	%	±%
Conservative	Bill Sadler *	977	38.8	+1.6
Liberal Democrats	Ian Radford	723	28.7	+12.8
UKIP	David Hudson	518	20.6	+15.7
Labour	Chris Turner	302	12.0	−14.6
Majority		254	10.1	−0.5
Turnout		2,520	31.1	−24.0
Conservative hold		Swing	−5.6	

Mildenhall
Party	Candidate	Votes	%	±%
Conservative	Stephen Frost	972	43.9	+0.8
UKIP	David Chandler	660	29.8	+24.3
Liberal Democrats	John Smith	320	14.4	+1.1
Labour	Gillian Vallack	264	11.9	−12.0
Majority		312	14.1	−5.1
Turnout		2,216	33.5	−25.0
Conservative hold		Swing	−11.7	

Newmarket and Red Lodge
Party	Candidate	Votes	%	±%
Conservative	Lisa Chambers *	1,072	47.5	+3.7
Liberal Democrats	Andrew Appleby	588	26.0	+0.3
UKIP	Dave Whitelear	397	17.6	+11.5
Labour	Joy Uney	202	8.9	−15.5
Majority		484	21.4	+3.4
Turnout		2,259	32.8	−24.4
Conservative hold		Swing	+1.7	

Row Heath
Party	Candidate	Votes	%	±%
Conservative	Colin Noble *	1,466	52.5	+11.7
UKIP	Ian Smith	842	30.2	+20.9
Liberal Democrats	Eleanor Minshall	307	11.0	−2.1
Labour	Thomas Caple	178	6.4	−15.7
Majority		624	22.3	+3.5
Turnout		2,824	39.0	−22.5
Conservative hold		Swing	−4.6	

=== Ipswich ===
District Summary

Party	Seats	+/-	Votes	%	+/-
Conservative	6	▲5	16,855	38.1	+4.5
Labour	4	▼6	12,046	27.2	−13.2
Liberal Democrat	3	▲1	11,304	25.6	−0.5
Green	0	Steady	2,418	5.5	+5.5
BNP	0	Steady	942	2.1	+2.1
Suffolk Together	0	Steady	686	1.6	+1.6

Division results

Bixley
Party	Candidate	Votes	%	±%
Conservative	Russell Harsant *	1,247	55.1	+6.4
Liberal Democrats	Clive Witter	391	17.3	−8.0
Green	Tim Glover	317	14.0	+14.0
Labour	Lindsey Rawlingson	308	13.6	−12.4
Majority		856	37.8	+15.0
Turnout		2,268	39.7	−30.8
Registered electors		5,715		
Conservative hold		Swing	+7.2	

Bridge
Party	Candidate	Votes	%	±%
Labour Co-op	Bryony Rudkin *	623	32.2	−15.6
Conservative	James Spencer	610	31.5	+0.6
Liberal Democrats	Louise Gooch	264	13.5	−7.7
BNP	Euan Priddy	228	11.8	+11.8
Green	Rick Deeks	212	10.9	+10.9
Majority		13	0.7	−16.2
Turnout		1,947	28.2	−24.9
Registered electors		6,912		
Labour Co-op hold		Swing	−8.1	

Chantry (2)
Party	Candidate	Votes	%	±%
Conservative	Paul West	1,858	35.5	+2.5
Labour	Peter Gardiner	1,819	34.8	−13.0
Labour	Keith Rawlingson *	1,726		
Conservative	Nadia Cenci	1,691		
Liberal Democrats	Alison Williams	840	16.1	−3.2
Liberal Democrats	Robert Tiffen	826		
BNP	Dennis Boater	714	13.7	+13.7
Majority		39	0.7	−14.1
Turnout		5,061	30.2	−27.4
Registered electors		16,751		
Conservative gain from Labour		Swing	+7.8	
Labour hold		Swing		

Gainsborough
Party	Candidate	Votes	%	±%
Conservative	Carol Debman	997	40.0	+6.8
Labour	Bill Quinton *	974	39.1	−9.2
Liberal Democrats	Kirk Chambers	523	21.0	+2.4
Majority		23	0.9	−14.1
Turnout		2,543	31.3	−26.9
Registered electors		8,128		
Conservative gain from Labour		Swing	+8.0	

Priory Heath
Party	Candidate	Votes	%	±%
Labour	Susan Maguire *	718	42.1	−9.3
Conservative	Stephen Ion	625	36.9	+8.9
Liberal Democrats	Leslie Nicholls	350	20.7	+0.4
Majority		93	5.5	−18.1
Turnout		1,718	27.5	−27.7
Registered electors		6,241		
Labour hold		Swing	−9.1	

Rushmere
Party	Candidate	Votes	%	±%
Conservative	Judy Terry	1,196	43.4	+7.7
Labour	Sue Thomas *	704	25.5	−14.9
Green	Eric Nelson	430	15.6	+15.6
Liberal Democrats	Robin Whitmore	426	15.5	−8.5
Majority		492	17.9	+13.1
Turnout		2,756	39.1	−27.2
Registered electors		7,093		
Conservative gain from Labour		Swing	+11.3	

St Helen's
Party	Candidate	Votes	%	±%
Liberal Democrats	Jane Chambers	678	31.5	−2.9
Conservative	Paul Carter	561	26.1	−0.4
Labour	Kevan Lim *	526	24.4	−14.8
Green	Brenda Cavanagh	387	18.0	+18.0
Majority		117	5.4	+0.6
Turnout		2,176	29.7	−29.0
Registered electors		7,337		
Liberal Democrats gain from Labour		Swing	+6.0	

St John's
Party	Candidate	Votes	%	±%
Labour Co-op	Sandy Martin *	1,022	40.3	−3.1
Conservative	Gavin Maclure	865	34.1	+2.9
Liberal Democrats	Richard Atkins	354	13.9	−11.6
Green	Lucy Glover	298	11.7	+11.7
Majority		157	6.2	−6.0
Turnout		2,558	38.8	−25.2
Registered electors		6,595		
Labour Co-op hold		Swing	+4.2	

St. Margaret's and Westgate (2)
Party	Candidate	Votes	%	±%
Liberal Democrats	Inga Lockington *	2,409	41.2	+1.6
Liberal Democrats	Andrew Cann *	2,375		
Conservative	Sophie Stanbrook	1,853	31.7	−0.5
Conservative	Janet Sibley	1,773		
Labour	Elizabeth Cooper	811	13.9	−14.3
Labour	Carole Jones	787		
Green	Amy Drayson	774	13.2	+13.2
Majority		556	9.5	+2.1
Turnout		5,645	38.3	−24.2
Registered electors		14,759		
Liberal Democrats hold		Swing	+1.1	
Liberal Democrats hold		Swing		

Whitehouse & Whitton (2)
Party	Candidate	Votes	%	±%
Conservative	Robin Vickery	1,862	40.7	+7.2
Conservative	Mary Young	1,717		
Labour	Anthony Lewis *	1,065	23.3	−19.3
Liberal Democrats	Nigel Cheeseman	966	21.1	−2.9
Labour	Martin Goonan	963		
Liberal Democrats	Stephen Williams	902		
Suffolk Together	Michael Hallatt	686	15.0	+15.0
Majority		797	17.4	+8.3
Turnout		4,429	28.4	−29.3
Registered electors		15,590		
Conservative gain from Labour		Swing	+13.3	
Conservative gain from Labour		Swing		

=== Mid Suffolk ===
District Summary

Party	Seats	+/-	Votes	%	+/-
Conservative	6	▼2	13,722	43.6	+0.4
Liberal Democrat	3	▲1	8,836	28.1	−0.5
Green	1	▲1	4,248	13.5	+7.6
Labour	0	Steady	2,089	6.6	−13.4
Suffolk Together	0	Steady	1,147	3.7	+3.7
UKIP	0	Steady	883	2.8	+2.8
Independent	0	Steady	283	0.9	−1.3
BNP	0	Steady	240	0.8	+0.8

Division results

Bosmere
Party	Candidate	Votes	%	±%
Liberal Democrats	Julia Truelove *	1,308	40.8	+7.6
Conservative	David Whybrow	867	27.0	−2.3
UKIP	Sam Streatfeild	450	14.0	+14.0
Suffolk Together	Stephen Wright	432	13.5	+13.5
Labour	Elaine Halton	150	4.7	−11.1
Majority		441	13.8	+10.0
Turnout		3,207	42.9	−25.4
Liberal Democrats hold		Swing	+5.0	

Gipping Valley
Party	Candidate	Votes	%	±%
Liberal Democrats	John Field *	1,250	43.7	+7.1
Conservative	John Whitehead	739	25.8	−1.9
Suffolk Together	John Blakenham	715	25.0	+25.0
Labour	Terry Wilson	160	5.6	−10.8
Majority		511	17.8	+6.7
Turnout		2,864	42.4	−24.6
Liberal Democrats hold		Swing	+4.5	

Hartismere
Party	Candidate	Votes	%	±%
Conservative	Charles Michell*	1,828	55.0	+0.8
Green	Roger Stearn	804	24.2	+24.2
Liberal Democrats	Richard Flower	435	13.1	−10.6
Labour	Kevin O'Keefe	258	7.8	−14.4
Majority		1,024	30.8	+0.3
Turnout		3,325	45.6	−24.4
Conservative hold		Swing	−11.7	

Hoxne and Eye
Party	Candidate	Votes	%	±%
Conservative	Guy McGregor *	1,878	56.8	+6.5
Liberal Democrats	Andrew Aalders-Dunthorne	1,198	36.3	+8.6
Labour	Alan Brown	229	6.9	−15.1
Majority		680	20.6	−2.2
Turnout		3,305	46.3	−25.5
Conservative hold		Swing	−1.1	

Stowmarket North and Stowupland
Party	Candidate	Votes	%	±%
Conservative	Gary Green *	1,211	46.0	+6.5
Liberal Democrats	Nicky Turner	586	22.3	+4.1
Green	Nigel Rozier	575	21.8	+12.8
Labour	Suzanne Britton	261	9.9	−23.3
Majority		625	23.7	+17.5
Turnout		2,633	32.2	−32.5
Conservative hold		Swing	+1.2	

Stowmarket South
Party	Candidate	Votes	%	±%
Conservative	Anne Whybrow *	875	32.6	−1.5
Liberal Democrats	Keith Scarff	802	29.9	+7.5
UKIP	Christopher Streatfield	433	16.1	+16.1
Green	Libbi Meade	328	12.2	+0.0
Labour	Duncan Macpherson	245	9.1	−22.2
Majority		73	2.7	−0.1
Turnout		2,683	36.5	−26.9
Conservative hold		Swing	−4.5	

Thedwastre North
Party	Candidate	Votes	%	±%
Conservative	Jane Storey *	1,745	53.3	+6.1
Liberal Democrats	Judy Broadway	766	23.4	−10.7
Independent	Stephen Carlton-Walker	283	8.6	+8.6
Labour	David Hill	243	7.4	−11.4
BNP	John Jones	240	7.3	+7.3
Majority		979	29.9	+16.8
Turnout		3,277	42.3	−27.3
Conservative hold		Swing	+8.4	

Thedwastre South
Party	Candidate	Votes	%	±%
Liberal Democrats	Penny Otton *	1,221	37.3	+3.0
Conservative	Sam Powell	1,188	36.3	−10.7
Green	John Matthissen	723	22.1	+22.1
Labour	David Jermy	143	4.4	−14.4
Majority		33	1.0	−11.6
Turnout		3,275	48.3	−24.1
Liberal Democrats gain from Conservative		Swing	+6.8	

Thredling
Party	Candidate	Votes	%	±%
Conservative	Eddy Alcock *	2,068	62.8	+11.2
Liberal Democrats	Lorraine Edwards	1,008	30.6	−17.8
Labour	James Higgins	217	6.6	+6.6
Majority		1,060	32.2	+28.9
Turnout		3,293	45.9	−25.8
Conservative hold		Swing	+14.5	

Upper Gipping
Party	Candidate	Votes	%	±%
Green	Andrew Stringer	1,818	50.7	+14.4
Conservative	Caroline Byles	1,323	36.9	−6.0
Liberal Democrats	Mark Valladares	262	7.3	+7.3
Labour	John Cook	183	5.1	−15.7
Majority		495	13.8	+7.3
Turnout		3,586	48.7	−23.6
Green gain from Conservative		Swing	+10.2	

=== Suffolk Coastal ===
District Summary

Party	Seats	+/-	Votes	%	+/-
Conservative	12	▼1	26,361	51.7	+7.3
Liberal Democrat	1	▲1	16,030	31.5	−2.4
Labour	0	Steady	5,750	11.3	−9.7
Green	0	Steady	2,614	5.1	+5.1
Independent	0	Steady	192	0.4	−0.3

Division results

Aldeburgh and Leiston
Party	Candidate	Votes	%	±%
Conservative	Ron Ward *	1,439	47.5	+6.4
Liberal Democrats	Jill Hubbard	743	24.5	−1.5
Green	Anna Clark	451	14.9	+14.9
Labour	Terry Hodgson	399	13.2	−19.7
Majority		696	23.0	+14.7
Turnout		3,032	40.4	−21.9
Conservative hold		Swing	+4.0	

Blything
Party	Candidate	Votes	%	±%
Conservative	Rae Leighton *	1,382	42.3	+4.2
Liberal Democrats	Barry Slater	1,075	32.9	+0.5
Green	John Barrett	399	12.2	+12.2
Labour	Paul Bennett	222	6.8	−12.0
Independent	Dave Remy	192	5.9	−4.8
Majority		307	9.4	+3.8
Turnout		3,270	46.5	−19.3
Conservative hold		Swing	+1.9	

Carlford
Party	Candidate	Votes	%	±%
Conservative	Peter Bellfield *	2,172	66.4	+10.6
Liberal Democrats	Victor Harrup	865	26.4	+0.3
Labour	Edna Salmon	236	7.2	−10.9
Majority		1,307	39.9	+10.2
Turnout		3,273	48.3	−24.0
Conservative hold		Swing	+5.1	

Felixstowe Coastal (2 Seats)
Party	Candidate	Votes	%	±%
Conservative	Nick Barber *	3,001	49.5	+10.7
Conservative	Graham Newman *	2,833		
Liberal Democrats	Pam Dangerfield	2,329	38.4	+5.1
Liberal Democrats	Michael Ninnmey	2,246		
Labour	Dennis Carpenter	732	12.1	−15.8
Labour	Brendan Lambe	692		
Majority		672	11.1	+5.6
Turnout		6,062	40.9	−22.5
Conservative hold		Swing	+2.8	
Conservative hold		Swing		

Felixstowe North and Trimley
Party	Candidate	Votes	%	±%
Conservative	John Goodwin *	1,391	43.4	+4.6
Labour	Mike Deacon	952	29.7	−5.1
Liberal Democrats	Gez Hughes	441	13.7	−12.8
Green	Jonathan Mulberg	425	13.2	+13.2
Majority		439	13.7	+9.6
Turnout		3,209	42.7	−21.4
Conservative hold		Swing	+4.8	

Framlingham
Party	Candidate	Votes	%	±%
Conservative	Colin Hart *	1,805	54.0	+5.2
Liberal Democrats	Andrew Houseley	652	19.5	−14.6
Green	Eddie Thompson	625	18.7	+18.7
Labour	Tony Dockerill	260	7.8	−9.4
Majority		1,153	34.5	+19.8
Turnout		3,342	48.3	−20.6
Conservative hold		Swing	+9.9	

Kesgrave and Rushmere St. Andrew (2 Seats)
Party	Candidate	Votes	%	±%
Conservative	John Klaschka *	2,821	57.2	+15.9
Conservative	Steven Hudson *	2,799		
Liberal Democrats	Margaret Aalders	1,426	28.9	−2.7
Liberal Democrats	Adrian Taylor	1,378		
Labour	Stan Robinson	689	14.0	−13.2
Labour	Stephen Connelly	546		
Majority		1,395	28.3	+18.6
Turnout		4,936	34.4	−31.1
Conservative hold		Swing	+9.3	
Conservative hold		Swing		

Martlesham
Party	Candidate	Votes	%	±%
Conservative	Patricia O'Brien *	1,915	48.4	+5.3
Liberal Democrats	John Kelso	1,356	34.2	−4.5
Green	John Forbes	466	11.8	+11.8
Labour	Howard Needham	224	5.7	−12.6
Majority		559	14.1	+9.8
Turnout		3,961	45.9	−24.4
Conservative hold		Swing	+4.9	

Wickham
Party	Candidate	Votes	%	±%
Conservative	Michael Bond	1,730	53.6	+10.0
Liberal Democrats	Martin Whitaker	1,141	35.3	+2.7
Labour	Val Pizzey	359	11.1	−12.7
Majority		589	18.2	+7.3
Turnout		3,230	41.5	−24.1
Conservative hold		Swing	+3.7	

Wilford
Party	Candidate	Votes	%	±%
Conservative	Rosie Clarke *	1,842	60.5	+10.3
Liberal Democrats	Hugh Pilkington	918	30.2	−19.6
Labour	Grayden Webb	283	9.3	+9.3
Majority		924	30.4	+29.8
Turnout		3,043	48.9	−18.9
Conservative hold		Swing	+14.9	

Woodbridge
Party	Candidate	Votes	%	±%
Liberal Democrats	Caroline Page *	1,460	47.2	+7.2
Conservative	Geoff Holdcroft	1,231	39.8	+0.3
Green	Anthony Taylor	248	8.0	+8.0
Labour	Roy Burgon	156	5.0	−15.5
Majority		229	7.4	
Turnout		3,095	48.9	−17.9
Liberal Democrats gain from Conservative		Swing	+3.4	

=== St. Edmundsbury ===
District Summary

Party	Seats	+/-	Votes	%	+/-
Conservative	8	▼1	18,250	47.9	+7.1
Liberal Democrat	1	▲1	7,967	20.9	−1.2
Independent	1	▲1	3,897	10.2	+6.1
Green	1	▲1	1,924	5.1	+3.7
Labour	0	▼2	5,920	11.6	−13.7
UKIP	0	Steady	909	2.4	−3.9
Suffolk Together	0	Steady	750	2.0	+2.0

Division results

Blackbourn
Party	Candidate	Votes	%	±%
Conservative	Joanna Spicer *	2,065	58.8	+2.8
Suffolk Together	Amber Newman	750	21.4	+21.4
Liberal Democrats	David Bradbury	475	13.5	−3.4
Labour	Pervez Khan	222	6.3	−15.5
Majority		1,315	37.4	+3.3
Turnout		3,528	46.0	−30.9
Registered electors		7,665		
Conservative hold		Swing	−9.3	

Clare
Party	Candidate	Votes	%	±%
Conservative	Jane Midwood *	2,248	55.8	+3.8
UKIP	Ray Crowson	909	22.6	+14.1
Liberal Democrats	Martin Redbond	561	13.9	−25.6
Labour	Neil Moffat	310	7.7	+7.7
Majority		1,339	33.2	+20.7
Turnout		4,028	49.0	−28.9
Registered electors				
Conservative hold		Swing	−5.2	

Eastgate and Moreton Hall
Party	Candidate	Votes	%	±%
Independent	Trevor Beckwith	1,227	47.5	+14.1
Conservative	Frank Warby *	970	37.5	−1.9
Liberal Democrats	Geoff Hills	225	8.7	−14.3
Labour	Diane Hind	164	6.3	+6.3
Majority		257	9.9	
Turnout		2,586	37.4	−34.6
Registered electors				
Independent gain from Conservative		Swing	+8.0	

Hardwick
Party	Candidate	Votes	%	±%
Liberal Democrats	Craig Dearden-Phillips	1,063	37.2	+8.1
Independent	Paul Hopfensperger *	824	28.8	+28.8
Conservative	Stefan Oliver *	791	27.7	−11.4
Labour	Gill Malik	181	6.3	−18.8
Majority		239	8.4	
Turnout		2,885	43.6	−37.1
Registered electors		6,623		
Liberal Democrats gain from Conservative		Swing	+9.7	

Haverhill Cangle (2 Seats)
Party	Candidate	Votes	%	±%
Conservative	Tim Marks *	1,767	50.0	+13.1
Conservative	Phillip French *	1,713		
Liberal Democrats	Mick Graham	1,023	28.9	+8.5
Liberal Democrats	Ken Rolph	942		
Labour	Lisa Carr	747	21.1	−16.0
Labour	Patrick Hanlon	685		
Majority		744	21.0	+20.8
Turnout		3,537	28.5	−31.4
Registered electors				
Conservative gain from Labour		Swing	+14.5	
Conservative hold		Swing	+2.3	

Haverhill East and Kedington
Party	Candidate	Votes	%	±%
Conservative	Anne Gower	1,223	57.6	+22.0
Liberal Democrats	Terry McNally	564	26.6	−1.5
Labour	Daniel Summers	335	15.8	−15.2
Majority		659	31.1	+26.4
Turnout		2,122	31.4	−30.8
Registered electors				
Conservative hold		Swing	+11.8	

Thingoe North
Party	Candidate	Votes	%	±%
Conservative	Beccy Hopfensperger *	1,732	58.5	+6.7
Liberal Democrats	David Chappell	1,024	34.6	+12.6
Labour	Bob Cockle	207	7.0	−14.2
Majority		708	23.9	−5.9
Turnout		2,963	39.3	−39.7
Registered electors				
Conservative hold		Swing	−3.0	

Thingoe South
Party	Candidate	Votes	%	±%
Conservative	Terry Clements *	1,973	63.1	+11.0
Liberal Democrats	Gordon Hughes	840	26.8	+7.7
Labour	Cliff Hind	313	10.0	−12.1
Majority		1,133	36.2	+6.1
Turnout		3,126	46.2	−32.4
Registered electors				
Conservative hold		Swing	+1.7	

Tower (2 Seats)
Party	Candidate	Votes	%	±%
Conservative	Paul Farmer	2,042	28.8	+0.5
Green	Mark Ereira-Guyer	1,924	27.1	+22.4
Independent	David Nettleton	1,846	26.0	+17.8
Conservative	Richard Rout	1,726		
Labour	Kevin Waterson	645	9.1	−23.6
Liberal Democrats	Daniel Warren	641	9.0	−8.9
Labour	Kevin Hind	624		
Liberal Democrats	Allan Jones	605		
Majority		118	1.7	−2.8
Turnout		5,465	35.1	−33.5
Registered electors		15,576		
Conservative hold		Swing	−11.0	
Green gain from Labour		Swing	+23.0	

=== Waveney ===
District Summary

Party	Seats	+/-	Votes	%	+/-
Conservative	12	▲8	20,238	38.9	+5.4
UKIP	1	▲1	4,690	9.0	+9.0
Labour	0	▼9	10,691	20.5	−17.5
Green	0	Steady	8,968	17.2	+10.3
Liberal Democrat	0	Steady	7,492	14.4	−4.4

Division results

Beccles (2 Seats)
Party	Candidate	Votes	%	±%
Conservative	Mark Bee *	2,021	41.7	+2.7
Conservative	Chris Punt	1,782		
Green	Graham Elliott	1,473	30.4	+20.1
Green	Netta Swallow	1,018		
Labour	John Taylor *	746	15.4	−19.2
Labour	Keith Jenkins	704		
Liberal Democrats	Alison Briggs	604	12.5	−3.6
Liberal Democrats	Brian Howe	386		
Majority		548	11.3	
Turnout		4,844	39.9	−23.8
Conservative hold		Swing	−8.7	
Conservative gain from Labour		Swing	+11.0	

Bungay
Party	Candidate	Votes	%	±%
Conservative	David Ritchie *	1,515	49.6	+8.1
Green	Paul Jackson	657	21.5	+11.7
Liberal Democrats	Dave O`Neill	466	15.3	−5.9
Labour	Lynn Caswell	416	13.6	−13.8
Majority		858	28.1	+14.0
Turnout		3,054	41.9	−26.9
Conservative hold		Swing	−1.8	

Gunton (2 Seats)
Party	Candidate	Votes	%	±%
Conservative	Mary Rudd	1,648	36.1	+9.7
Conservative	Bruce Provan	1,440		
Labour	Keith Patience *	1,263	27.7	−14.2
Labour	David Thomas *	958		
Green	Peter Eyres	919	20.2	+13.4
Green	Maxine Narburgh	822		
Liberal Democrats	Michelle Lavill	731	16.0	−1.6
Liberal Democrats	Steven Taylor	661		
Majority		385	8.4	
Turnout		4,561	30.9	−20.9
Conservative gain from Labour		Swing	+12.0	
Conservative gain from Labour		Swing		

Halesworth
Party	Candidate	Votes	%	±%
Conservative	Tony Goldson	1,553	52.0	+5.6
Green	Jen Berry	572	19.2	+9.4
Liberal Democrats	Janet Blowers O`Neill	443	14.8	−1.5
Labour	Peter Coghill	419	14.0	−13.5
Majority		981	32.8	+13.9
Turnout		2,987	41.0	−29.1
Conservative hold		Swing	−1.9	

Kessingland and Southwold
Party	Candidate	Votes	%	±%
Conservative	John Goldsmith	1,330	42.0	−3.1
UKIP	Jack Tyler	870	27.4	+27.4
Labour	Jacki Wheatley	363	11.5	−18.7
Liberal Democrats	Lesley Roberts	348	11.0	−7.7
Green	Michael Platt	259	8.2	+2.1
Majority		460	14.5	−0.4
Turnout		3,170	42.2	−27.6
Conservative hold		Swing	−15.3	

Lowestoft South (2 Seats)
Party	Candidate	Votes	%	±%
UKIP	Bill Mountford	1,318	26.2	+26.2
Conservative	Deanna Law	1,200	23.8	−2.7
Conservative	Jamie Starling	1,098		
Labour	Jane Hore *	1,016	20.2	−22.8
Liberal Democrats	Rosemary Hudson	932	18.5	−6.4
Liberal Democrats	Chris Thomas	793		
Labour	Julian Swainson *	788		
Green	James Harrison	574	11.4	+5.8
Green	Michael Liddiment	426		
Majority		5,040	2.3	−14.2
Turnout		118	30.9	−20.7
UKIP gain from Labour		Swing	+24.5	
Conservative gain from Labour		Swing	+10.1	

Oulton (2 Seats)
Party	Candidate	Votes	%	±%
Conservative	Mike Barnard	1,887	36.8	+5.0
Conservative	Colin Law	1,536		
UKIP	Bernard Ladd	1,280	24.9	+24.9
UKIP	Bert Poole	1,222		
Labour	Allyson Barron *	1,074	20.9	−14.6
Labour	Malcolm Cherry *	1,063		
Liberal Democrats	Brenna Batchelder	456	8.9	−5.6
Liberal Democrats	Joy Russell	447		
Green	Christopher Goodings	438	8.5	+3.5
Green	Trevor Rix	438		
Majority		607	11.8	+7.9
Turnout		5,135	34.3	−23.6
Conservative gain from Labour		Swing	+9.8	
Conservative gain from Labour		Swing		

Pakefield (2 Seats)
Party	Candidate	Votes	%	±%
Conservative	Kathy Gosling	1,659	41.6	+7.9
Conservative	Ken Sale	1,569		
Labour	Peter Byatt	958	24.0	−17.9
Labour	Roger Bellham *	923		
Green	Mike Milan	727	18.2	+10.6
Green	Philip Tregear	645		
Liberal Democrats	Jim Russell	641	16.1	−0.7
Liberal Democrats	Sandra Tonge	584		
Majority		701	17.6	+9.4
Turnout		3,985	34.6	−23.7
Conservative gain from Labour		Swing	+12.9	
Conservative gain from Labour		Swing		
