= 2001 Suffolk County Council election =

2001 UK local government election

- 7 June 2001

All 80 seats in the Suffolk County Council 41 seats needed for a majority
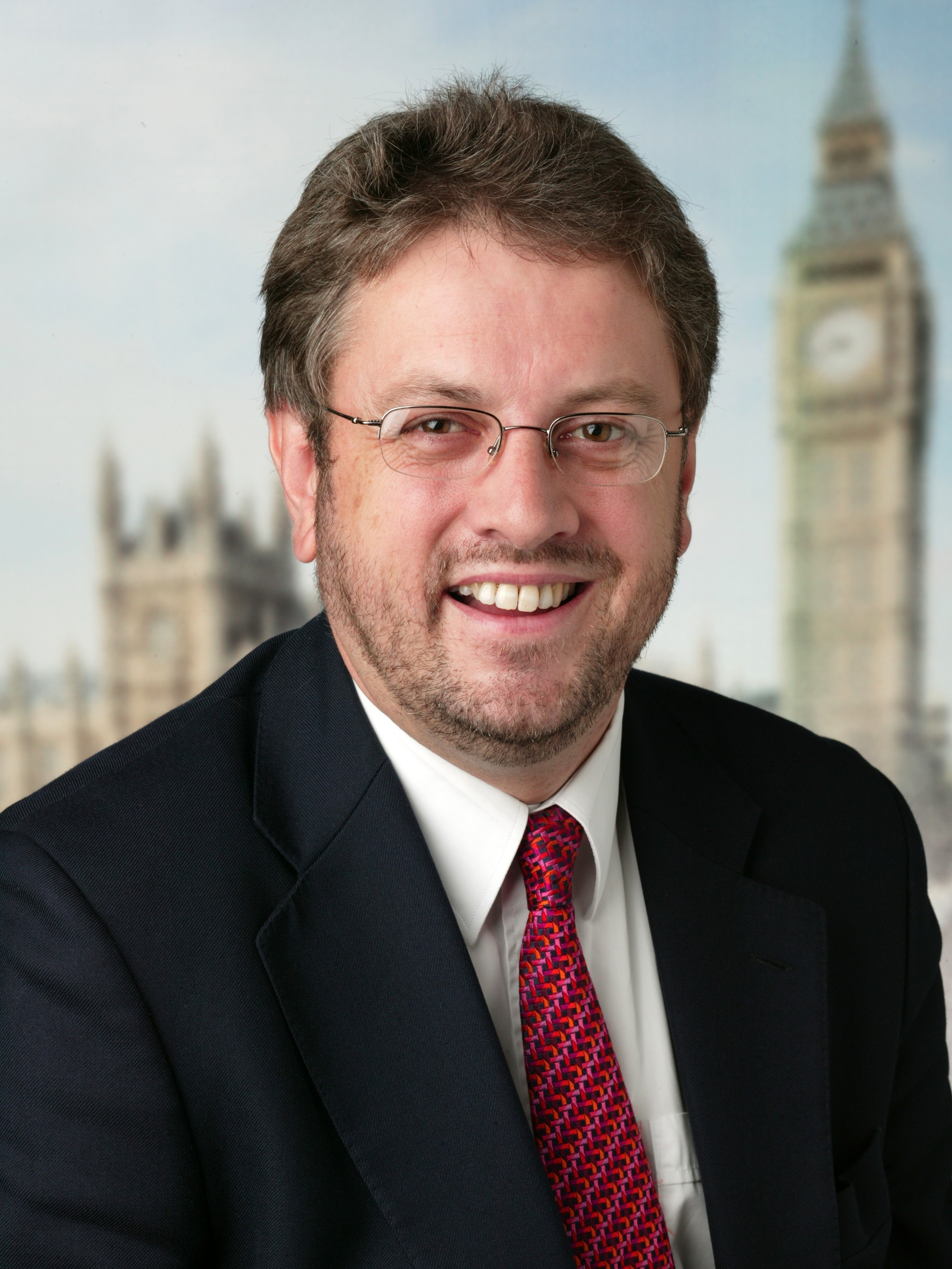

	First party	Second party	Third party
		Con	LD
Leader	Chris Mole	Sue Sida-Lockett	Peter Monk
Party	Labour	Conservative	Liberal Democrats
Leader since	November 1989	May 1997	May 2000
Leader's seat	Ipswich Town	Thedwastre North	Wilford
Last election	34 seats, 36.1%	31 seats, 37.7%	15 seats, 23.4%
Seats before	33	30	14
Seats won	36	31	12
Seat change	▲3	Steady	▼3
Popular vote	108,891	133,349	68,967
Percentage	34.3%	42.0%	21.7%
Swing	▼1.9%	▲4.2%	▼1.7%
	Fourth party
Party	Independent
Last election	1 seats, 2.5%
Seats before	4
Seats won	1
Seat change	Steady
Popular vote	4,721
Percentage	1.5%
Swing	▼1.0%
- Map of the 2001 Suffolk County Council Election result.
Council control before election
No overall control
Council control after election
No overall control

Elections for Suffolk County Council as part of the 2001 United Kingdom local elections were held on 7 June. 80 councillors were elected from various electoral divisions, which returned one county councillor each by first-past-the-post voting for a four-year term of office. The electoral divisions were the same as those used at the previous election in 1997. The whole council was up for election and the council stayed under no overall control.

As with other county elections in England, these local elections in Suffolk took place on the same day as the 2001 United Kingdom general election.

== Government Formation ==
The incumbent Labour-Liberal Democrat coalition continued in government with Labour group leader Chris Mole (Ipswich Town) remaining as council leader until he won a parliamentary by-election in November 2001. He was succeeded by Jane Hore (Lowestoft Central), however in May 2003 she was replaced by deputy Bryony Rudkin (Priory Heath).

== Election results ==
2001 Suffolk local election result
Party	Seats	Gains	Losses	Net gain/loss	Seats %	Votes %	Votes	+/−
Labour	36	5	2	+3	45.0	34.3	108,891	–1.9
Conservative	31	6	6	0	38.8	42.0	133,349	+4.2
Liberal Democrats	12	3	6	−3	15.0	21.7	68,957	–1.7
Independent	1	0	0	0	1.3	1.5	4,721	–1.0
Green	0	0	0	0	0	0.3	1,104	+0.1
Local Party Bury St Edmunds	0	0	0	0	0	0.2	573	+0.2
UKIP	0	0	0	0	0	0.1	222	+0.1

== Results by District ==
=== Babergh ===
Babergh District Summary
Party	Seats	+/-	Votes	%	+/-
Liberal Democrats	4	▼2	14,790	34.8	–3.5
Conservative	3	▲2	15,889	37.4	+3.6
Labour	2	Steady	7,445	17.5	–3.7
Independent	1	Steady	3,911	9.2	+2.4
Green	0	Steady	438	1.0	N/A
Total	10	Steady	42,473	64.7	–9.7

Division results

Belstead Brook
Party	Candidate	Votes	%	±%
Liberal Democrats	Anne Pollard *	3,305	62.0	−9.3
Conservative	Gerald White	2,025	38.0	+9.3
Majority		1,280	24.0	−18.6
Turnout		5,330	61.6	−9.3
Liberal Democrats hold		Swing	−9.3	

Brett
Party	Candidate	Votes	%	±%
Conservative	John Roberts	1,820	52.5	+13.7
Liberal Democrats	Fiona Jenkins	1,644	47.5	+6.4
Majority		176	5.0	
Turnout		3,464	69.2	−7.3
Conservative gain from Liberal Democrats		Swing	+3.7	

Cosford
Party	Candidate	Votes	%	±%
Conservative	Jeremy Pembroke	1,621	51.3	+9.0
Liberal Democrats	Vivienne Hoy *	1,539	48.7	+2.6
Majority		82	2.6	−1.1
Turnout		3,160	71.3	−2.1
Conservative gain from Liberal Democrats		Swing	+3.2	

Great Cornard
Party	Candidate	Votes	%	±%
Labour	Wilmoth Gibson *	2,001	58.2	−6.7
Conservative	Peter Beer	1,438	41.8	+6.7
Majority		563	16.4	−13.3
Turnout		3,439	58.3	−12.1
Labour hold		Swing	−6.7	

Hadleigh
Party	Candidate	Votes	%	±%
Liberal Democrats	David Grutchfield *	1,526	42.1	−32.8
Labour	James Quinlan	1,040	28.7	+28.7
Conservative	Lesley Chalmers	698	19.3	−5.9
Independent	Eileen Banks	360	9.9	+9.9
Majority		486	13.4	−36.3
Turnout		3,624	64.3	−9.9
Liberal Democrats hold		Swing	−30.7	

Melford
Party	Candidate	Votes	%	±%
Independent	Richard Kemp *	3,216	68.8	+15.9
Conservative	David Burch	1,462	31.3	+5.3
Majority		1,754	37.4	+10.6
Turnout		4,678	63.0	−12.1
Independent hold		Swing	+5.3	

Peninsula
Party	Candidate	Votes	%	±%
Liberal Democrats	David Wood *	2,316	60.4	−4.7
Conservative	Jane Burch	1,078	28.1	−6.7
Green	Andrew Sterling	438	11.4	+11.4
Majority		1,238	32.3	+2.0
Turnout		3,832	69.0	−4.9
Liberal Democrats hold		Swing	+1.0	

Samford
Party	Candidate	Votes	%	±%
Liberal Democrats	Mary Lavender	1,639	37.7	−7.7
Conservative	William Yorke-Edwards	1,624	37.3	+4.4
Labour	Carol Brinded	1,090	25.0	+3.3
Majority		15	0.4	−12.0
Turnout		4,353	71.7	−7.9
Liberal Democrats hold		Swing	−6.0	

Stour Valley
Party	Candidate	Votes	%	±%
Conservative	Selwyn Pryor *	2,572	51.0	+4.0
Liberal Democrats	Gabrielle Blackman-Sheppard	1,269	25.2	−3.2
Labour	Emma Bishton	1,203	23.9	−0.8
Majority		1,303	25.8	+7.1
Turnout		5,044	68.2	−8.6
Conservative hold		Swing	+3.6	

Sudbury
Party	Candidate	Votes	%	±%
Labour	Nicholas Irwin	2,111	38.0	−7.7
Liberal Democrats	Martyn Booth	1,552	28.0	+4.4
Conservative	John Sayers	1,551	28.0	−2.7
Independent	Rex Thake	335	6.0	+6.0
Majority		559	10.0	−5.1
Turnout		5,549	57.9	−13.9
Labour hold		Swing	−6.1	

=== Forest Heath ===
Forest Heath District Summary
Party	Seats	+/-	Votes	%	+/-
Conservative	6	Steady	11,578	59.8	+14.0
Labour	0	Steady	7,773	40.2	+10.0
Total	6	Steady	19,351	56.3	–11.2

Division results

Brandon
Party	Candidate	Votes	%	±%
Conservative	William Bishop *	2,027	61.3	+17.6
Labour	Cyril Brown	1,279	38.7	+5.2
Majority		748	22.6	+12.4
Turnout		3,306	55.6	−10.2
Conservative hold		Swing	+6.2	

Exning
Party	Candidate	Votes	%	±%
Conservative	Donald Levick *	2,071	55.5	+12.1
Labour	Sheila Malham	1,663	44.5	+16.8
Majority		408	11.0	−3.5
Turnout		3,734	54.7	−13.6
Conservative hold		Swing	−2.3	

Icknield
Party	Candidate	Votes	%	±%
Conservative	Jane Andrews-Smith *	2,224	64.8	+15.5
Labour	Patricia Rucinski	1,206	35.2	+7.2
Majority		1,018	29.6	+8.3
Turnout		3,430	63.8	−9.9
Conservative hold		Swing	+4.2	

Mildenhall
Party	Candidate	Votes	%	±%
Conservative	Paul Pendleton *	1,565	54.0	+9.5
Labour	John Taylor	1,334	46.0	+6.3
Majority		231	8.0	+3.3
Turnout		2,899	55.2	−9.7
Conservative hold		Swing	+1.6	

Newmarket Town
Party	Candidate	Votes	%	±%
Conservative	William Sadler	1,541	53.2	+5.0
Labour	Paul Dwane	1,353	46.8	+14.2
Majority		188	6.4	−9.3
Turnout		2,894	52.7	−10.5
Conservative hold		Swing	−4.6	

Row Heath
Party	Candidate	Votes	%	±%
Conservative	Ellen Crane *	2,150	69.6	+23.7
Labour	Pamela Brown	938	30.4	+9.6
Majority		1,212	39.2	+16.9
Turnout		3,088	56.5	−12.7
Conservative hold		Swing	+7.1	

=== Ipswich ===
Ipswich District Summary
Party	Seats	+/-	Votes	%	+/-
Labour	15	▲2	26,859	49.5	–2.7
Conservative	1	▼3	18,194	33.5	–1.6
Liberal Democrats	1	▲1	9,195	16.9	+4.2
Total	17	Steady	54,248	57.3	–12.8

Division results

Bixley
Party	Candidate	Votes	%	±%
Conservative	Russell Harsant *	1,844	48.5	−2.1
Labour	Lee Mangar	1,139	30.0	+0.7
Liberal Democrats	Gregory Elliott	816	21.5	+1.3
Majority		705	18.5	−2.8
Turnout		3,799	66.3	−10.8
Conservative hold		Swing	−1.4	

Bridge
Party	Candidate	Votes	%	±%
Labour	Harold Mangar *	1,682	57.4	+4.4
Conservative	Carlton Vajzovic	714	24.4	−7.6
Liberal Democrats	Dale Cartwright	533	18.2	+3.2
Majority		968	33.0	+12.0
Turnout		2,929	51.3	−11.8
Labour hold		Swing	+6.0	

Broom Hill
Party	Candidate	Votes	%	±%
Labour	Noel Tostevin	1,233	41.8	+2.8
Conservative	Mary Young *	1,202	40.8	+1.6
Liberal Democrats	Jane Chambers	514	17.4	−4.4
Majority		31	1.0	
Turnout		2,949	57.4	−12.1
Labour gain from Conservative		Swing	+0.6	

Castle Hill
Party	Candidate	Votes	%	±%
Labour	Graham Manuel	1,862	50.6	+12.5
Conservative	Dale Jackson *	1,817	49.4	+7.4
Majority		45	1.2	
Turnout		3,679	64.9	−11.8
Labour gain from Conservative		Swing	+2.6	

Chantry
Party	Candidate	Votes	%	±%
Labour	Susan Thomas *	1,405	59.6	−0.9
Conservative	Kathleen Kenna	603	25.6	+1.0
Liberal Democrats	Charles Blue	351	14.9	−0.1
Majority		802	34.0	−1.9
Turnout		2,359	52.9	−12.9
Labour hold		Swing	−1.0	

Gainsborough
Party	Candidate	Votes	%	±%
Labour	Ronald Sudds *	1,889	60.6	+1.6
Conservative	Anthony Ramsey	793	25.4	+1.6
Liberal Democrats	Louise Gooch	435	14.0	−3.2
Majority		1,096	35.2	+0.0
Turnout		3,117	52.2	−15.6
Labour hold		Swing	−0.0	

Ipswich St. Margarets
Party	Candidate	Votes	%	±%
Liberal Democrats	Inga Lockington	1,865	47.3	+24.8
Conservative	Jeffrey Stansfield *	1,315	33.4	−6.7
Labour	John Cook	762	19.3	−18.1
Majority		550	13.9	+11.3
Turnout		3,942	64.8	−8.8
Liberal Democrats gain from Conservative		Swing	+15.7	

Ipswich Town
Party	Candidate	Votes	%	±%
Labour	Christopher Mole *	1,628	54.5	−1.4
Conservative	Susan Rush	742	24.8	−0.6
Liberal Democrats	Kenneth Toye	617	20.7	+2.0
Majority		886	29.7	−0.8
Turnout		2,987	47.6	−12.3
Labour hold		Swing	−0.4	

Priory Heath
Party	Candidate	Votes	%	±%
Labour	Bryony Rudkin *	1,576	54.5	+0.1
Conservative	Elizabeth Harsant	830	28.7	+0.8
Liberal Democrats	Catherine French	488	16.9	−0.9
Majority		746	25.8	−0.6
Turnout		2,894	54.1	−14.8
Labour hold		Swing	−0.3	

Rushmere
Party	Candidate	Votes	%	±%
Labour	John Le Grys *	1,750	47.2	−9.4
Conservative	Stephen Ion	1,272	34.3	−9.2
Liberal Democrats	Richard Atkins	688	18.5	+18.5
Majority		478	12.9	−0.2
Turnout		3,710	62.1	−11.6
Labour hold		Swing	−0.1	

Sprites
Party	Candidate	Votes	%	±%
Labour	Robin Sargent *	1,824	60.2	−6.4
Conservative	Carole Leggett	831	27.4	−6.1
Liberal Democrats	James Williams	376	12.4	+12.4
Majority		993	32.8	−0.3
Turnout		3,031	57.6	−12.6
Labour hold		Swing	−0.2	

St Clements
Party	Candidate	Votes	%	±%
Labour	Adele Cook	1,740	48.8	−8.1
Conservative	David Hale	1,201	33.7	−9.4
Liberal Democrats	Robin Whitmore	625	17.5	+17.5
Majority		539	15.1	+1.3
Turnout		3,566	60.8	−11.4
Labour hold		Swing	+0.6	

St John's
Party	Candidate	Votes	%	±%
Labour	Alexander Martin *	1,828	50.5	−7.6
Conservative	George Cockram	1,125	31.1	−10.9
Liberal Democrats	Clive Witter	669	18.5	+18.5
Majority		703	19.4	+3.3
Turnout		3,622	60.0	−10.5
Labour hold		Swing	+1.7	

Stoke Park
Party	Candidate	Votes	%	±%
Labour	Keith Rawlingson	1,408	48.9	+0.8
Conservative	Michael Rogers	942	32.7	+1.1
Liberal Democrats	David Mullett	530	18.4	−2.0
Majority		466	16.2	−0.3
Turnout		2,880	52.3	−16.6
Labour hold		Swing	−0.2	

Whitehouse
Party	Candidate	Votes	%	±%
Labour	Terence Green	1,779	68.2	+11.0
Conservative	Stephen Lark	831	31.8	+6.3
Majority		948	36.4	+4.8
Turnout		2,610	48.3	−16.7
Labour hold		Swing	+2.3	

Whitton
Party	Candidate	Votes	%	±%
Labour	Anthony Lewis *	1,604	65.1	−2.1
Conservative	Robin Vickery	860	34.9	+2.1
Majority		744	30.2	−4.2
Turnout		2,464	50.3	−16.0
Labour hold		Swing	−2.1	

=== Mid Suffolk ===
Mid Suffolk District Summary
Party	Seats	+/-	Votes	%	+/-
Conservative	5	Steady	20,419	45.7	+5.5
Liberal Democrats	3	▼1	13,831	30.9	–1.8
Labour	2	▲1	10,439	23.4	–2.3
Total	10	Steady	44,689	66.1	–8.6

Division results

Bosmere
Party	Candidate	Votes	%	±%
Liberal Democrats	Rosalind Scott *	2,214	47.4	−2.2
Conservative	Ian Mason	1,578	33.8	+3.1
Labour	Janet Preece	881	18.9	−0.9
Majority		636	13.6	−5.3
Turnout		4,673	64.3	−8.9
Liberal Democrats hold		Swing	−2.7	

Gipping Valley
Party	Candidate	Votes	%	±%
Liberal Democrats	John Field	2,325	55.8	+55.8
Conservative	John Williams *	1,845	44.2	−7.6
Majority		480	11.6	+7.9
Turnout		4,170	62.8	−8.9
Liberal Democrats gain from Conservative		Swing	+31.7	

Hartismere
Party	Candidate	Votes	%	±%
Conservative	Charles Michell *	2,777	59.4	+17.9
Labour	Timothy Lodge	1,897	40.6	+6.0
Majority		880	18.8	+11.9
Turnout		4,674	65.7	−7.1
Conservative hold		Swing	+6.0	

Hoxne
Party	Candidate	Votes	%	±%
Conservative	Guy McGregor	2,529	51.9	+8.5
Liberal Democrats	Robert Van Slooten	2,343	48.1	−8.5
Majority		186	3.8	−9.4
Turnout		4,872	69.6	−6.2
Conservative gain from Liberal Democrats		Swing	+8.5	

Stowmarket St Mary's
Party	Candidate	Votes	%	±%
Labour	Ronald Snell	1,273	37.1	+6.1
Conservative	George Paton	1,240	36.1	+8.0
Liberal Democrats	Julia Truelove	922	26.8	−14.2
Majority		33	1.0	−9.1
Turnout		3,435	63.4	−10.9
Labour gain from Liberal Democrats		Swing	+10.2	

Stowmarket St Peter's
Party	Candidate	Votes	%	±%
Labour	Duncan Macpherson *	1,594	44.4	−1.0
Conservative	Keith Myers-Hewitt	1,317	36.7	+5.7
Liberal Democrats	Roger Rehahn	676	18.8	−4.7
Majority		277	7.7	−6.7
Turnout		3,587	61.0	−8.9
Labour hold		Swing	−3.3	

Thedwastre North
Party	Candidate	Votes	%	±%
Conservative	Susan Sida-Lockett *	2,533	49.8	+3.0
Labour	John Dougall	1,493	29.3	+1.5
Liberal Democrats	Jennifer Blackburn	1,063	20.9	−4.4
Majority		1,040	20.5	+1.5
Turnout		5,089	68.7	−12.7
Conservative hold		Swing	+0.7	

Thedwastre South
Party	Candidate	Votes	%	±%
Conservative	Christopher Storey	1,929	39.5	−0.0
Liberal Democrats	Carol Milward	1,884	38.5	+6.4
Labour	Christine Descombes	1,075	22.0	−6.4
Majority		45	1.0	−6.3
Turnout		4,888	66.9	−8.4
Conservative hold		Swing	−3.2	

Thredling
Party	Candidate	Votes	%	±%
Liberal Democrats	Helen Whitworth *	2,404	51.1	−1.9
Conservative	Timothy Passmore	2,300	48.9	+1.9
Majority		104	2.2	−3.8
Turnout		4,704	68.9	−3.8
Liberal Democrats hold		Swing	−1.9	

Upper Gipping
Party	Candidate	Votes	%	±%
Conservative	Jeremy Clover *	2,371	51.6	+13.4
Labour	Joan Barker	2,226	48.4	+17.6
Majority		145	3.2	−4.2
Turnout		4,597	67.9	−8.7
Conservative hold		Swing	−2.1	

=== Suffolk Coastal ===
Suffolk Coastal District Summary
Party	Seats	+/-	Votes	%	+/-
Conservative	7	Steady	20,419	44.8	+4.3
Liberal Democrats	3	▼1	13,831	30.4	–0.1
Labour	3	▲1	10,439	22.9	–5.4
Green	0	Steady	666	1.5	+1.2
Independent	0	Steady	215	0.5	+0.1
Total	14	Steady	45,570	46.9	–27.6

Division results

Blything
Party	Candidate	Votes	%	±%
Conservative	Richard Church *	1,820	52.6	+6.8
Liberal Democrats	Peter Perren	1,642	47.4	+18.9
Majority		178	5.2	−12.1
Turnout		3,462	68.5	−6.3
Conservative hold		Swing	−6.1	

Carlford
Party	Candidate	Votes	%	±%
Conservative	Steven Hudson	2,914	53.5	+6.8
Liberal Democrats	Diana Ball	2,536	46.5	+16.0
Majority		378	7.0	−9.2
Turnout		5,450	67.0	−11.9
Conservative hold		Swing	−4.6	

Clay Hills
Party	Candidate	Votes	%	±%
Labour	Joan Girling *	2,441	55.5	+2.0
Conservative	Peter Batho	1,958	44.5	−2.0
Majority		483	11.0	+4.0
Turnout		4,399	61.5	−9.1
Labour hold		Swing	+2.0	

Colneis
Party	Candidate	Votes	%	±%
Conservative	Patricia O'Brien	2,950	51.3	+8.3
Labour	Catherine Knight	2,139	37.2	+1.1
Green	John Forbes	666	11.6	+11.6
Majority		811	14.1	+7.2
Turnout		5,755	65.7	−9.8
Conservative hold		Swing	+3.6	

Felixstowe Ferry
Party	Candidate	Votes	%	±%
Conservative	Margaret Harris	2,270	52.6	+4.9
Labour	John Mullen	1,148	26.6	+3.3
Liberal Democrats	Lee Reeves	894	20.7	−8.2
Majority		1,122	26.0	+7.3
Turnout		4,312	70.1	−7.9
Conservative hold		Swing	+0.8	

Felixstowe Landguard
Party	Candidate	Votes	%	±%
Labour	David Rowe	1,450	35.3	+5.2
Conservative	Ann Rodwell	1,344	32.7	+6.7
Liberal Democrats	Cherrie MacGregor *	1,311	31.9	−5.7
Majority		106	2.6	−5.0
Turnout		4,105	58.0	−10.4
Labour gain from Liberal Democrats		Swing	+5.5	

Felixstowe Walton
Party	Candidate	Votes	%	±%
Labour	Donald Smith *	2,116	58.4	+12.7
Conservative	David Bentinck	1,505	41.6	+6.5
Majority		611	16.8	+6.1
Turnout		3,621	63.6	−11.7
Labour hold		Swing	+3.1	

Framlingham
Party	Candidate	Votes	%	±%
Liberal Democrats	Peter Howard *	2,123	50.9	−4.6
Conservative	Christine Carlton	2,051	49.1	+4.6
Majority		72	1.8	−9.1
Turnout		4,174	68.1	−5.1
Liberal Democrats hold		Swing	−4.6	

Kesgrave and Martlesham
Party	Candidate	Votes	%	±%
Liberal Democrats	John Kelso	3,004	40.4	+5.1
Conservative	Paul West	2,654	35.7	−4.1
Labour	Christopher Newbury	1,778	23.9	+1.5
Majority		350	4.7	+0.3
Turnout		7,436	67.0	−9.2
Liberal Democrats gain from Conservative		Swing	+4.6	

Plomesgate
Party	Candidate	Votes	%	±%
Conservative	Ronald Ward *	1,884	51.8	+9.0
Liberal Democrats	Winifred Moss	1,751	48.2	+14.4
Majority		133	3.6	−5.5
Turnout		3,635	66.0	−7.0
Conservative hold		Swing	−2.7	

Wickham
Party	Candidate	Votes	%	±%
Conservative	Colin Barrow *	2,070	43.7	+6.6
Liberal Democrats	Ronald Else	1,477	31.2	−3.7
Labour	Valerie Pizzey	1,192	25.2	−3.0
Majority		593	12.5	+10.3
Turnout		4,739	68.1	−7.8
Conservative hold		Swing	+5.2	

Wilford
Party	Candidate	Votes	%	±%
Liberal Democrats	Peter Monk *	2,324	52.6	+11.3
Conservative	Ann Herring	2,093	47.4	+9.9
Majority		231	5.2	+1.4
Turnout		4,417	63.3	−8.9
Liberal Democrats hold		Swing	+0.7	

Woodbridge
Party	Candidate	Votes	%	±%
Conservative	Nigel Barratt	1,653	39.5	+6.6
Liberal Democrats	Sally Bull	1,189	28.4	−14.2
Labour	Roy Burgon	1,133	27.0	+2.5
Independent	Benjamin Redsell	215	5.1	+5.1
Majority		464	11.1	+1.4
Turnout		4,190	68.1	−8.1
Conservative gain from Liberal Democrats		Swing	+10.4	

=== St. Edmundsbury ===
St Edmundsbury District Summary
Party	Seats	+/-	Votes	%	+/-
Conservative	5	▼1	21,412	45.0	+4.9
Labour	5	▲1	19,176	40.3	+4.4
Liberal Democrats	1	Steady	5,627	11.8	–10.8
Independent	0	Steady	595	1.2	–0.2
Local Party Bury St Edmunds	0	Steady	573	1.2	N/A
UKIP	0	Steady	222	0.5	N/A
Total	11	Steady	47,605	62.4	–9.7

Division results

Abbeygate and Eastgate
Party	Candidate	Votes	%	±%
Labour	Trevor Beckwith	2,318	40.2	+7.7
Conservative	Derek Speakman *	1,999	34.7	−4.4
Liberal Democrats	David Chappell	853	14.8	−1.4
Independent	Brian Lockwood	595	10.3	+10.3
Majority		319	5.5	
Turnout		5,765	63.5	−9.1
Labour gain from Conservative		Swing	+6.1	

Blackbourn
Party	Candidate	Votes	%	±%
Conservative	Joanna Spicer *	3,179	64.1	+13.7
Labour	Alison Fairgrieve	1,778	35.9	+6.6
Majority		1,401	28.2	+7.1
Turnout		4,957	64.8	−9.0
Conservative hold		Swing	+3.6	

Clare
Party	Candidate	Votes	%	±%
Liberal Democrats	Leslie Warmington	2,118	50.6	−2.9
Conservative	Peter Stevens	2,069	49.4	+2.9
Majority		49	1.2	−5.8
Turnout		4,187	66.3	−7.5
Liberal Democrats hold		Swing	−2.9	

Haverhill North
Party	Candidate	Votes	%	±%
Labour	Laurence Kiernan *	2,966	60.2	+6.5
Conservative	Adam Whittaker	1,963	39.8	+8.5
Majority		1,003	20.4	−1.9
Turnout		4,929	56.2	−12.7
Labour hold		Swing	−1.0	

Haverhill South
Party	Candidate	Votes	%	±%
Labour	Maggie Lee *	2,536	62.3	+13.2
Conservative	Anthony Sutton	1,533	37.7	+12.3
Majority		1,003	24.6	+0.9
Turnout		4,069	51.3	−14.5
Labour hold		Swing	+0.5	

Northgate and St. Olave's
Party	Candidate	Votes	%	±%
Labour	David Lockwood *	2,020	72.0	+3.6
Conservative	Francis Warby	565	20.1	+1.7
UKIP	Ian Smith	222	7.9	+7.9
Majority		1,455	51.9	+2.0
Turnout		2,807	46.7	−22.3
Labour hold		Swing	+1.0	

Risbridge
Party	Candidate	Votes	%	±%
Conservative	Jane Midwood *	2,769	64.2	+13.5
Labour	Georgina Keatley	1,543	35.8	+7.4
Majority		1,226	28.4	+6.0
Turnout		4,312	70.2	−6.1
Conservative hold		Swing	+3.0	

Risbygate and Sexton's
Party	Candidate	Votes	%	±%
Labour	Ray Nowak *	1,756	49.2	−6.3
Conservative	Andrew Knibbs	1,243	34.8	−9.8
Local Party Bury St Edmunds	David Nettleton	573	16.0	+16.0
Majority		513	14.4	+3.6
Turnout		3,572	66.8	−5.5
Labour hold		Swing	+1.8	

Southgate and Westgate
Party	Candidate	Votes	%	±%
Conservative	Stefan Oliver	1,859	34.6	−0.6
Labour	Robert Corfe	1,821	33.9	+3.3
Liberal Democrats	Grant Elliot	1,692	31.5	−2.7
Majority		38	0.7	−0.3
Turnout		5,372	68.8	−5.0
Conservative hold		Swing	−2.0	

Thingoe North
Party	Candidate	Votes	%	±%
Conservative	Valerie White	2,520	52.5	+3.2
Labour	David Dawson	1,316	27.4	−2.9
Liberal Democrats	Lisa Couper	964	20.1	−0.4
Majority		1,204	25.1	+6.1
Turnout		4,800	68.0	−5.5
Conservative hold		Swing	+3.0	

Thingoe South
Party	Candidate	Votes	%	±%
Conservative	Elizabeth Milburn *	1,713	60.4	+9.2
Labour	Phillipa Terrington	1,122	39.6	+11.1
Majority		591	20.8	−1.9
Turnout		2,835	68.2	−7.2
Conservative hold		Swing		

=== Waveney ===
District Summary

Party	Seats	+/-	Votes	%	+/-
Labour	10	▼2	25,552	48.2	–3.6
Conservative	4	▲2	19,963	37.6	+4.4
Liberal Democrat	0	Steady	7,548	14.2	+4.4

Division results

Beccles
Party	Candidate	Votes	%	±%
Labour	Alan Thwaites	1,754	44.3	−10.8
Conservative	Keith Standring	1,386	35.0	+4.2
Liberal Democrats	Alison Briggs	815	20.6	+6.5
Majority		368	9.3	−15.0
Turnout		3,955	65.6	−8.8
Labour hold		Swing	−7.5	

Bungay
Party	Candidate	Votes	%	±%
Conservative	Morris Rose *	1,851	45.0	+4.2
Labour	Lynn Derges	1,483	36.0	−3.4
Liberal Democrats	Roberta Pumer	781	19.0	−0.9
Majority		368	9.0	+7.8
Turnout		4,115	64.9	−9.5
Conservative hold		Swing	+3.8	

Gunton
Party	Candidate	Votes	%	±%
Conservative	Susan Back	1,384	43.8	+3.4
Labour	Ernest Skepelhorn	1,315	41.6	−4.1
Liberal Democrats	Anthony Tibbitt	461	14.6	+0.7
Majority		69	2.2	−3.1
Turnout		3,160	62.6	−10.3
Conservative gain from Labour		Swing	+3.8	

Halesworth
Party	Candidate	Votes	%	±%
Conservative	Peter Aldous	2,012	54.8	+7.9
Labour	Jacqueline Wagner	1,660	45.2	−7.9
Majority		352	9.6	+3.5
Turnout		3,672	64.8	−9.3
Conservative gain from Labour		Swing	+7.9	

Lothingland North
Party	Candidate	Votes	%	±%
Labour	Brian Hunter *	2,336	50.8	−2.2
Conservative	Stephen Ames	1,622	35.3	+2.7
Liberal Democrats	Brian Howe	636	13.8	−0.5
Majority		714	15.5	−4.9
Turnout		4,594	62.0	−12.2
Labour hold		Swing	−2.4	

Lothingland South
Party	Candidate	Votes	%	±%
Labour	Anthony Andrews *	2,477	49.8	+6.2
Conservative	Kenneth Sale	1,744	35.1	+8.8
Liberal Democrats	David O'Neill	753	15.1	+15.1
Majority		733	14.7	+1.2
Turnout		4,974	58.1	−12.9
Labour hold		Swing	−1.3	

Lowestoft Central
Party	Candidate	Votes	%	±%
Labour	Jane Hore *	1,740	59.5	−3.1
Conservative	Stephen Ardley	605	20.7	+1.8
Liberal Democrats	Paul Meadez	579	19.8	+1.2
Majority		1,135	38.8	−4.9
Turnout		2,924	47.6	−16.0
Labour hold		Swing	−2.5	

Lowestoft St Margaret's
Party	Candidate	Votes	%	±%
Labour	Marie Rodgers *	2,000	59.3	−4.3
Conservative	Anne Mylan	917	27.2	+3.8
Liberal Democrats	Darren Ware	458	13.6	+0.5
Majority		1,083	32.1	−8.1
Turnout		3,375	58.6	−12.8
Labour hold		Swing	−4.1	

Normanston
Party	Candidate	Votes	%	±%
Labour	David Thomas	1,915	61.3	−5.2
Conservative	Stuart Foulger	791	25.3	+3.6
Liberal Democrats	Stephen Went	419	13.4	+1.5
Majority		1,124	36.0	−8.8
Turnout		3,125	52.0	−15.1
Labour hold		Swing	−4.4	

Oulton Broad
Party	Candidate	Votes	%	±%
Labour	Julian Swainson	1,809	42.1	−12.4
Conservative	Michael Barnard	1,786	41.5	−4.0
Liberal Democrats	Andrew Thomas	706	16.4	+16.4
Majority		23	0.6	−8.4
Turnout		4,301	59.3	−11.2
Labour hold		Swing	−4.2	

Pakefield
Party	Candidate	Votes	%	±%
Labour	Roger Belham *	1,981	44.9	−4.7
Liberal Democrats	Andrew Shepherd	1,233	28.0	+6.7
Conservative	Valerie Pulford	1,196	27.1	−1.9
Majority		748	16.9	−3.7
Turnout		4,410	61.5	−10.8
Labour hold		Swing	−5.7	

Southwold
Party	Candidate	Votes	%	±%
Conservative	John Goldsmith *	1,993	59.7	+20.0
Labour	Paul Honeker	1,343	40.3	+18.0
Majority		650	19.4	+17.6
Turnout		3,336	66.6	−8.9
Conservative hold		Swing	+1.0	

Wainford
Party	Candidate	Votes	%	±%
Labour	John Taylor *	1,969	45.5	−12.1
Conservative	Christopher Punt	1,663	38.5	−3.9
Liberal Democrats	Nicholas Bromley	691	16.0	+16.0
Majority		306	7.0	−8.2
Turnout		4,323	66.3	−4.5
Labour hold		Swing	−4.1	

Whittington
Party	Candidate	Votes	%	±%
Labour	Malcolm Cherry *	1,770	55.1	−5.6
Conservative	Barry Bee	1,013	31.5	+3.2
Liberal Democrats	Sandra Tonge	429	13.4	+2.4
Majority		757	23.6	−8.8
Turnout		3,212	59.9	−14.1
Labour hold		Swing	−4.4	
