= 1985 Suffolk County Council election =

1985 UK local government election

- 2 May 1985

All 80 seats to Suffolk County Council 41 seats needed for a majority
- Registered: 454,835
- Turnout: 38.6%

	First party	Second party
Party	Conservative	Labour
Last election	49 seats, 46.5%	31 seats, 41.6%
Seats won	50	23
Seat change	▲1	▼8
Popular vote	76,050	60,371
Percentage	42.9%	34.0%
Swing	▼3.6%	▼7.6%
	Third party	Fourth party
Party	Independent	Alliance
Last election	2 seats, 2.8%	0 seats, 6.9%
Seats won	4	3
Seat change	▲2	▲3
Popular vote	5,915	32,339
Percentage	3.3%	18.2%
Swing	▲0.5%	▲11.3%
- Results of the 1985 Suffolk County Council election.
Council control before election
Conservative
Council control after election
Conservative

The 1985 Suffolk County Council election took place on 2 May 1985 to elect members of Suffolk County Council in Suffolk, England. It was held on the same day as other local elections.

== Summary ==
=== Election result ===
1985 Suffolk County Council election
Party	Candidates	Seats	Gains	Losses	Net gain/loss	Seats %	Votes %	Votes	+/−
Conservative	78	50	1	5	▲1	62.5	42.9	76,050	–3.6
Labour	79	23	4	1	▼8	28.8	34.0	60,371	–7.6
Independent	9	4	0	0	▲2	5.0	3.3	5,915	+0.5
Alliance	53	3	1	0	▲3	3.8	18.2	32,339	+11.3
Ecology	10	0	0	0	Steady	0.0	1.3	2,276	–0.1
Residents	1	0	0	0	Steady	0.0	0.2	413	N/A

== Division results by local authority ==
=== Babergh ===
Babergh District Summary
Party	Seats	+/-	Votes	%	+/-
Conservative	6	▼2	11,036	44.3	
Labour	2	▲1	7,533	30.2	
Alliance	1	▲1	5,092	20.4	
Independent	1	Steady	960	3.9	
Ecology	0	Steady	311	1.2	
Total	10	Steady	24,932	42.5	

Division results

Belstead Brook
Party	Candidate	Votes	%
Conservative	John Clayton *	1,225	42.7
Alliance	Anne Pollard	1,005	35.0
Labour	Susan Thomas	639	22.3
Majority		220	7.7
Turnout		2,869	42.8
Registered electors		6,702	
Conservative win (new seat)			

Brett
Party	Candidate	Votes	%
Conservative	Arthur Skeels	1,061	52.2
Alliance	Mix Meynell	665	32.7
Labour	Diana Hastie	308	15.1
Majority		396	19.5
Turnout		2,034	43.6
Registered electors		4,660	
Conservative win (new seat)			

Cosford
Party	Candidate	Votes	%
Conservative	William Crockatt*	1,284	74.8
Labour	Paul Cain	432	25.2
Majority		852	49.7
Turnout		1,716	40.1
Registered electors		4,277	
Conservative win (new seat)			

Great Cornard
Party	Candidate	Votes	%
Labour	Mick Cornish	1,281	46.1
Conservative	Alf Eady	859	30.9
Alliance	Robert Hewett	636	22.9
Majority		422	15.2
Turnout		2,776	46.8
Registered electors		5,927	
Labour win (new seat)			

Hadleigh
Party	Candidate	Votes	%	±%
Independent	John Bloomfield *	960	60.4	+1.8
Labour	Margaret Nelson	629	39.6	–1.8
Majority		331	20.8	+3.6
Turnout		1,589	34.3	±0.0
Registered electors		4,627		
Independent hold		Swing	▲1.8	

Melford
Party	Candidate	Votes	%
Conservative	Freddie Gales *	1,327	47.7
Labour	Roy Thompson	742	26.7
Alliance	David Scott	714	25.7
Majority		585	21.0
Turnout		2,783	41.4
Registered electors		6,720	
Conservative win (new seat)			

Peninsula
Party	Candidate	Votes	%
Alliance	Janet Law	1,142	43.8
Conservative	P. Monroe*	1,038	39.8
Labour	Monica Armstrong	426	16.3
Majority		104	4.0
Turnout		2,606	49.6
Registered electors		5,255	
Alliance win (new seat)			

Samford
Party	Candidate	Votes	%
Conservative	William Curnow	1,193	40.3
Alliance	Joan Miller	930	31.4
Labour	Edward Irving *	836	28.3
Majority		263	8.9
Turnout		2,959	51.9
Registered electors		5,701	
Conservative win (new seat)			

Stour Valley
Party	Candidate	Votes	%
Conservative	Selwyn Pryor *	1,637	62.0
Labour	John Skinner	694	26.3
Ecology	Nick Miller	311	11.8
Majority		943	35.7
Turnout		2,642	38.8
Registered electors		6,812	
Conservative win (new seat)			

Sudbury
Party	Candidate	Votes	%	±%
Labour	Elizabeth Wiles	1,546	52.3	+5.9
Conservative	John Colman	1,412	47.7	–1.2
Majority		134	4.5	N/A
Turnout		2,958	37.0	–0.9
Registered electors		7,994		
Labour gain from Conservative		Swing	▲3.6	

=== Forest Heath ===
Forest Heath District Summary
Party	Seats	+/-	Votes	%	+/-
Conservative	5		5,491	50.1	▲1
Independent	1	▲1	1,146	10.4	
Labour	0	Steady	3,430	31.3	
Alliance	0	Steady	903	8.3	
Total	6	▲1	10,970	35.0	

Division results

Brandon
Party	Candidate	Votes	%
Conservative	John Wortley *	907	57.4
Labour	C. Copsesy	672	42.6
Majority		235	14.9
Turnout		1,579	30.4
Registered electors		5,186	
Conservative win (new seat)			

Exning
Party	Candidate	Votes	%
Conservative	Maurice Hopkinson	856	45.1
Alliance	David Griffith	558	29.4
Labour	A. Devoy	483	25.5
Majority		298	15.7
Turnout		1,897	30.6
Registered electors		6,200	
Conservative win (new seat)			

Ickneld
Party	Candidate	Votes	%
Conservative	Sarah Chester *	1,246	70.0
Labour	Beryl Burnett	533	30.0
Majority		713	40.1
Turnout		1,779	33.8
Registered electors		5,257	
Conservative win (new seat)			

Mildenhall
Party	Candidate	Votes	%
Conservative	Dorothy Madeley *	856	56.8
Labour	Brian Vallack	650	43.2
Majority		206	13.7
Turnout		1,506	33.8
Registered electors		4,457	
Conservative win (new seat)			

Newmarket Town
Party	Candidate	Votes	%
Conservative	Arthur Crickmere	1,087	48.4
Labour	Rosemary Muge	815	36.3
Alliance	Gordon Baldwin	345	15.4
Majority		272	12.1
Turnout		2,247	41.4
Registered electors		5,428	
Conservative win (new seat)			

Row Heath
Party	Candidate	Votes	%
Independent	Jack Haylock	1,146	58.4
Conservative	John Wiggin	539	27.5
Labour	Cyril Brown	277	14.1
Majority		607	30.9
Turnout		1,962	40.4
Registered electors		4,857	
Independent win (new seat)			

=== Ipswich ===
Ipswich District Summary
Party	Seats	+/-	Votes	%	+/-
Labour	12	▼2	16,946	52.1	
Conservative	4	Steady	11,429	35.1	
Alliance	0		4,167	12.8	Steady
Total	16	▼2	32,542	36.0'	

Division results

Bixley
Party	Candidate	Votes	%
Conservative	Nina Alcock *	1,380	56.7
Alliance	P. Ablitt	563	23.1
Labour	E. Urry	489	20.1
Majority		817	33.6
Turnout		2,432	41.8
Registered electors		5,813	
Conservative win (new seat)			

Bridge
Party	Candidate	Votes	%
Labour	W. Clark	1,260	71.1
Conservative	C. Body	511	28.9
Majority		749	42.3
Turnout		1,771	31.9
Registered electors		5,549	
Labour win (new seat)			

Broom Hill
Party	Candidate	Votes	%	±%
Conservative	Brian Pinner	1,124	61.0	–3.7
Labour	M. Vaughan	719	39.0	+14.9
Majority		405	22.0	–18.6
Turnout		1,843	34.8	–7.0
Registered electors		5,290		
Conservative hold		Swing	▼9.3	

Castle Hill
Party	Candidate	Votes	%
Conservative	Eddie Alcock	996	47.6
Labour	J. Metcalfe*	687	32.8
Alliance	E. Pearl	411	19.6
Majority		309	14.8
Turnout		2,094	35.1
Registered electors		5,964	
Conservative win (new seat)			

Chantry
Party	Candidate	Votes	%
Labour	J. Wells	901	75.2
Conservative	P. Steward	181	15.1
Alliance	J. Sanderson	116	9.7
Majority		720	60.1
Turnout		1,198	26.8
Registered electors		4,462	
Labour win (new seat)			

Gainsborough
Party	Candidate	Votes	%	±%
Labour	Ruby Skerritt *	1,559	84.5	+18.7
Conservative	J. Young	287	15.5	–18.7
Majority		1,272	68.9	+37.3
Turnout		1,846	32.1	–0.9
Registered electors		5,748		
Labour hold		Swing	▲18.7	

Ipswich St Margaret's
Party	Candidate	Votes	%	±%
Conservative	H. Davis*	1,219	50.1	–23.4
Labour	I. Chevous	653	26.9	+11.8
Alliance	J. Groves	560	23.0	+11.5
Majority		566	23.3	–35.1
Turnout		2,432	39.8	–4.9
Registered electors		6,108		
Conservative hold		Swing	▼17.6	

Ipswich Town
Party	Candidate	Votes	%
Labour	Julian Cusack *	1,259	66.3
Conservative	F. Brown	438	23.1
Alliance	A. Holden	201	10.6
Majority		821	43.3
Turnout		1,898	35.0
Registered electors		5,424	
Labour win (new seat)			

Priory Heath
Party	Candidate	Votes	%
Labour	D. Sierakowski*	1,247	63.7
Conservative	M. Morton	526	26.9
Alliance	R. Hawkins	184	9.4
Majority		1,957	36.8
Turnout		721	34.9
Registered electors		5,606	
Labour win (new seat)			

Rushmere
Party	Candidate	Votes	%	±%
Labour	P. Koppel	1,382	47.6	+16.9
Conservative	P. Hammond	1,081	37.2	–21.8
Alliance	B. Taylor	442	15.2	+7.3
Majority		301	10.4	N/A
Turnout		2,905	48.2	–3.1
Registered electors		6,029		
Labour gain from Conservative		Swing	▲19.4	

Sprites
Party	Candidate	Votes	%
Labour	Trevor Payne *	1,111	61.6
Conservative	K. Thomas	424	23.5
Alliance	M. Smith	268	14.9
Majority		687	38.1
Turnout		1,803	30.0
Registered electors		6,011	
Labour win (new seat)			

St Clements
Party	Candidate	Votes	%	±%
Labour	Chris Mole	1,345	48.3	+9.2
Conservative	S. Thompson	1,116	40.1	–20.8
Alliance	K. Prior	322	11.6	N/A
Majority		229	8.2	N/A
Turnout		2,783	48.5	–1.7
Registered electors		5,736		
Labour gain from Conservative		Swing	▲15.0	

St John's
Party	Candidate	Votes	%	±%
Labour	Andy MacKnelly	1,183	47.8	+5.2
Conservative	L. Howard	907	36.6	–20.8
Alliance	A. Howlett	386	15.6	N/A
Majority		276	11.1	N/A
Turnout		2,476	42.0	–4.2
Registered electors		5,895		
Labour gain from Conservative		Swing	▲13.0	

Stoke Park
Party	Candidate	Votes	%
Labour	L. Cogan*	939	54.2
Conservative	M. Doyle	520	30.0
Alliance	M. Redbond	273	15.8
Majority		419	24.2
Turnout		1,732	29.6
Registered electors		5,847	
Labour win (new seat)			

Whitehouse
Party	Candidate	Votes	%
Labour	J. Watkins	1,047	64.4
Conservative	B. Ferguson	339	20.8
Alliance	K. Pettican	241	14.8
Majority		708	43.5
Turnout		1,627	29.7
Registered electors		5,472	
Labour win (new seat)			

Whitton
Party	Candidate	Votes	%
Labour	F. Wilding*	1,165	66.8
Conservative	W. Crane	380	21.8
Alliance	T. Davis	200	11.5
Majority		785	45.0
Turnout		1,745	31.8
Registered electors		5,486	
Labour win (new seat)			

=== Mid Suffolk ===
Mid Suffolk District Summary
Party	Seats	+/-	Votes	%	+/-
Conservative	8	Steady	9,907	47.0	
Labour	1	Steady	5,412	25.7	
Independent	1	Steady	1,234	5.9	
Alliance	0	Steady	3,726	17.7	
Ecology	0	Steady	811	3.8	
Total	10	Steady	21,090	37.6	

Division results

Bosmere
Party	Candidate	Votes	%
Conservative	John Patton	1,132	50.6
Alliance	Graham Miller	698	31.1
Labour	Elaine Hunter	409	18.3
Majority		434	19.5
Turnout		2,239	37.8
Registered electors		5,923	
Conservative win (new seat)			

Gipping Valley
Party	Candidate	Votes	%
Conservative	Gavin Caldwell-Smith*	1,022	52.7
Labour	G. Cunningham	919	47.3
Majority		103	5.3
Turnout		1,941	35.5
Registered electors		5,470	
Conservative win (new seat)			

Hartismere
Party	Candidate	Votes	%
Independent	Charles Flatman	1,234	50.9
Conservative	M. Buxton	743	30.7
Labour	I. Goodey	446	18.4
Majority		491	20.3
Turnout		2,423	42.5
Registered electors		5,698	
Independent win (new seat)			

Hoxne
Party	Candidate	Votes	%
Conservative	Guy McGregor	1,356	53.8
Alliance	A. Pietrzak	710	28.2
Labour	E. Hatton	453	18.0
Majority		646	25.6
Turnout		2,519	40.3
Registered electors		6,247	
Conservative win (new seat)			

Stowmarket St Mary's
Party	Candidate	Votes	%
Labour	Ernie Nunn	689	37.9
Conservative	G. Paton	646	35.5
Alliance	J. Shaw	483	26.6
Majority		43	2.4
Turnout		1,818	40.5
Registered electors		4,485	
Labour win (new seat)			

Stowmarket St Peter's
Party	Candidate	Votes	%
Conservative	David Card	550	37.0
Labour	Ronald Snell	520	34.9
Alliance	Bruce Hewitt	378	25.4
Ecology	Brian Codd	40	2.7
Majority		30	2.0
Turnout		1,488	32.3
Registered electors		4,607	
Conservative win (new seat)			

Thedwastre North
Party	Candidate	Votes	%
Conservative	Sue Sida	1,155	47.2
Alliance	Christine Willison	778	31.8
Labour	Julian Keeble	338	13.8
Ecology	John Matthissen	174	7.1
Majority		377	15.4
Turnout		2,445	41.0
Registered electors		5,967	
Conservative win (new seat)			

Thedwastre South
Party	Candidate	Votes	%
Conservative	George Foss	897	44.3
Alliance	George Coleman	679	33.5
Labour	Robert Morris	330	16.3
Ecology	Clodagh Chapman	119	5.9
Majority		218	10.8
Turnout		2,025	34.7
Registered electors		5,840	
Conservative win (new seat)			

Thredling
Party	Candidate	Votes	%
Conservative	Jeremy Clover*	1,347	71.2
Labour	Anthony Lewis	545	28.8
Majority		802	42.4
Turnout		1,892	31.8
Registered electors		5,953	
Conservative win (new seat)			

Upper Gipping
Party	Candidate	Votes	%
Conservative	Don Farthing*	1,056	46.0
Labour	P. Oldfield*	763	33.2
Ecology	Roger Stearn	478	20.8
Majority		293	12.8
Turnout		2,297	39.3
Registered electors		5,839	
Conservative win (new seat)			

=== Suffolk Coastal ===
Suffolk Coastal District Summary
Party	Seats	+/-	Votes	%	+/-
Conservative	13	▲1	15,673	48.1	
Alliance	0	Steady	8,941	27.4	
Labour	0	▼2	6,541	20.1	
Independent	0	Steady	1,434	4.4	
Total	13	▼1	32,589	44.1	

Division results

Blything
Party	Candidate	Votes	%
Conservative	Hazel Hall *	1,320	50.9
Alliance	E. Ackroyd	478	18.4
Independent	R. Hare	428	16.5
Labour	P. Whelan	366	14.1
Majority		842	32.5
Turnout		2,592	49.3
Registered electors		5,257	
Conservative win (new seat)			

Carlford
Party	Candidate	Votes	%
Conservative	Simon Bestow *	1,199	51.1
Alliance	D. Missen	838	35.7
Labour	L. Hall	308	13.1
Majority		361	15.4
Turnout		2,345	40.3
Registered electors		5,824	
Conservative win (new seat)			

Clay Hills
Party	Candidate	Votes	%
Conservative	F. Barker*	1,322	44.9
Labour	Terry Hodgson	895	30.4
Independent	N. Ratcliff	395	13.4
Alliance	Barrie Skelcher	333	11.3
Majority		427	14.5
Turnout		2,945	46.7
Registered electors		6,304	
Conservative win (new seat)			

Colneis
Party	Candidate	Votes	%
Conservative	Ann Rodwell *	1,607	53.4
Alliance	D. Squirrell	794	26.4
Labour	S. Rose	608	20.2
Majority		813	27.0
Turnout		3,009	42.6
Registered electors		7,071	
Conservative win (new seat)			

Felixstowe Ferry
Party	Candidate	Votes	%
Conservative	Michael Goodman	1,659	57.1
Alliance	P. Warren	1,244	42.9
Majority		415	14.3
Turnout		2,903	50.2
Registered electors		4,785	
Conservative win (new seat)			

Felixstowe Landguard
Party	Candidate	Votes	%
Conservative	T. Savage	837	41.0
Alliance	D. Paddick	482	23.6
Labour	Denis Ballantyne	466	22.8
Independent	A. Loveday	255	12.5
Majority		355	17.4
Turnout		2,040	37.0
Registered electors		5,515	
Conservative win (new seat)			

Felixstowe Walton
Party	Candidate	Votes	%
Conservative	E. Hutchinson*	988	39.8
Labour	Don Smith *	846	34.1
Alliance	C. Morgan	649	26.1
Majority		142	5.7
Turnout		2,483	45.6
Registered electors		5,451	
Conservative win (new seat)			

Framlingham
Party	Candidate	Votes	%
Conservative	R. Hickson*	1,194	50.1
Alliance	S. Stocker	723	30.3
Labour	J. Campbell	467	19.6
Majority		471	19.8
Turnout		2,384	45.9
Registered electors		5,191	
Conservative win (new seat)			

Kesgrave & Martlesham
Party	Candidate	Votes	%
Conservative	Christopher Penn *	1,231	47.0
Labour	W. Maskell	704	26.9
Alliance	Edwin Wheeler	684	26.1
Majority		527	20.1
Turnout		2,619	40.5
Registered electors		6,461	
Conservative win (new seat)			

Plomesgate
Party	Candidate	Votes	%
Conservative	Felicity Cowley*	1,241	51.0
Alliance	J. Jacob	707	29.1
Labour	A. Morgan	485	19.9
Majority		534	21.9
Turnout		2,433	45.9
Registered electors		5,301	
Conservative win (new seat)			

Wickham
Party	Candidate	Votes	%
Conservative	J. Hazelwood*	963	45.9
Alliance	D. Fitch	704	33.5
Labour	M. Alsop	433	20.6
Majority		249	12.3
Turnout		2,090	36.9
Registered electors		5,691	
Conservative win (new seat)			

Wilford
Party	Candidate	Votes	%
Conservative	Robin Sheepshanks *	1,051	44.9
Labour	P. Buck	510	21.8
Alliance	A. Martin	422	18.0
Independent	N. Friend	356	15.2
Majority		541	23.1
Turnout		2,339	46.8
Registered electors		4,999	
Conservative win (new seat)			

Woodbridge
Party	Candidate	Votes	%
Conservative	B. Rosher*	1,061	44.3
Alliance	N. Twigge	883	36.8
Labour	B. Staines	453	18.9
Majority		178	7.4
Turnout		2,397	39.7
Registered electors		6,039	
Conservative win (new seat)			

=== St Edmundsbury ===
St Edmundsbury District Summary
Party	Seats	+/-	Votes	%	+/-
Conservative	7	Steady	11,079	45.1	
Labour	2	▼1	7,174	29.2	
Alliance	2	▲2	4,841	19.7	
Ecology	0	Steady	1,154	4.7	
Independent	0		340	1.4	
Total	11	▲1	24,588	38.3	

Division results

Abbeygate & Eastgate
Party	Candidate	Votes	%	±%
Conservative	Laver Oliver *	1,154	56.2	+2.0
Labour	Fred Roberts	555	27.0	–5.1
Ecology	Julia Rynsard	344	16.8	+3.0
Majority		599	29.2	+7.1
Turnout		2,053	40.2	–3.0
Registered electors		5,109		
Conservative hold		Swing	▲3.6	

Blackbourn
Party	Candidate	Votes	%
Conservative	George Reeve *	1,124	48.5
Alliance	Thomas Cook	659	28.4
Labour	Don Pollard	535	23.1
Majority		465	20.1
Turnout		2,318	36.6
Registered electors		6,337	
Conservative win (new seat)			

Clare
Party	Candidate	Votes	%
Conservative	David Hamilton-Lowe *	1,336	66.2
Labour	Patrick Conneely	683	33.8
Majority		653	32.3
Turnout		2,019	33.0
Registered electors		6,123	
Conservative win (new seat)			

Haverhill North
Party	Candidate	Votes	%
Labour	Ron Hartley *	1,129	64.8
Conservative	Sarah Fraser	612	35.2
Majority		517	29.7
Turnout		1,741	30.3
Registered electors		5,739	
Labour win (new seat)			

Haverhill South
Party	Candidate	Votes	%
Alliance	Colin Jones	1,005	45.4
Labour	David Evans *	769	34.7
Conservative	Jeffery Stevens	440	19.9
Majority		236	10.7
Turnout		2,214	34.6
Registered electors		6,393	
Alliance win (new seat)			

Northgate & St Olave's
Party	Candidate	Votes	%	±%
Labour	David Lockwood *	1,217	66.2	–10.2
Independent	Alf Bignell	340	18.5	N/A
Conservative	John Oxley	280	15.2	–8.4
Majority		877	47.7	–5.0
Turnout		1,837	34.3	–3.4
Registered electors		5,358		
Labour hold		Swing		

Risbridge
Party	Candidate	Votes	%
Conservative	Caroline Kirk	1,421	61.3
Labour	Maurice Perry	472	20.3
Ecology	Christopher Southall	427	18.4
Majority		949	40.9
Turnout		2,320	40.9
Registered electors		5,670	
Conservative win (new seat)			

Risbygate & Sextons
Party	Candidate	Votes	%	±%
Conservative	Richard Ferrier*	1,051	44.0	–12.4
Labour	Chris Keeble	727	30.5	–1.2
Alliance	Mark Wapshott	487	20.4	N/A
Ecology	Clive Whittaker	122	5.1	–6.8
Majority		324	13.6	–11.1
Turnout		2,387	44.4	+4.4
Registered electors		5,375		
Conservative hold		Swing	▼5.6	

Southgate & Westgate
Party	Candidate	Votes	%	±%
Alliance	Graham Jones	1,211	43.1	+5.4
Conservative	Joy Chow	1,137	40.4	–1.7
Labour	Brenda Shelley	463	16.5	–3.6
Majority		74	2.6	N/A
Turnout		2,811	46.3	–1.6
Registered electors		6,072		
Alliance gain from Conservative		Swing	▲3.6	

Thingoe North
Party	Candidate	Votes	%
Conservative	Cecil Salton*	1,342	52.1
Alliance	Reginald Harland	797	30.9
Labour	Peter Williams	288	11.2
Ecology	Richard Anstee-Parry	149	5.8
Majority		545	21.2
Turnout		2,576	42.2
Registered electors		6,100	
Conservative win (new seat)			

Thingoe South
Party	Candidate	Votes	%
Conservative	Mary MacRae	1,182	51.1
Alliance	Robert Corfe	682	29.5
Labour	K. West	336	14.5
Ecology	S. Sampson	112	4.8
Majority		500	21.6
Turnout		2,312	38.6
Registered electors		5,993	
Conservative win (new seat)			

=== Waveney ===
Waveney District Summary
Party	Seats	+/-	Votes	%	+/-
Conservative	7	▲2	11,428	37.3	
Labour	6	▼4	13,335	43.5	
Independent	1	▲1	801	2.6	
Alliance	0	Steady	4,671	15.2	
Residents	0	Steady	413	1.3	
Total	14	▼1	30,648	38.2	

Division results

Beccles
Party	Candidate	Votes	%
Conservative	R. Wooden*	852	39.6
Alliance	E. Crisp	809	37.6
Labour	J. Yates	489	22.7
Majority		43	2.0
Turnout		2,150	39.8
Registered electors		5,404	
Conservative win (new seat)			

Bungay
Party	Candidate	Votes	%	±%
Conservative	M. Kent*	1,029	43.4	+6.9
Alliance	L. Sterne	793	33.4	+5.3
Labour	D. Huthart	551	23.2	–4.4
Majority		236	9.9	+1.5
Turnout		2,373	42.9	–9.2
Registered electors		5,527		
Conservative hold		Swing	▲0.8	

Gunton
Party	Candidate	Votes	%	±%
Conservative	B. Harvey	988	44.0	–2.8
Alliance	A. Chamberlain	791	35.2	N/A
Labour	G. Strachan	468	20.8	–32.4
Majority		197	8.8	N/A
Turnout		2,247	43.2	+9.1
Registered electors		5,203		
Conservative gain from Labour		Swing		

Halesworth
Party	Candidate	Votes	%	±%
Conservative	R. Niblett	1,022	44.6	–5.9
Alliance	M. Haycock	642	28.0	N/A
Labour	Marie Rodgers	629	27.4	–22.1
Majority		380	16.6	+15.7
Turnout		2,293	46.8	–6.2
Registered electors		4,903		
Conservative hold		Swing		

Lothingland North
Party	Candidate	Votes	%
Labour	Brian Hunter *	1,461	54.6
Conservative	P. Paul	1,217	45.4
Majority		244	9.1
Turnout		2,678	40.9
Registered electors		6,553	
Labour win (new seat)			

Lothingland South
Party	Candidate	Votes	%
Independent	Jim Mitchell	801	34.0
Labour	R. Jones	782	33.2
Conservative	A. Choveaux	772	32.8
Majority		19	0.8
Turnout		2,355	35.0
Registered electors		6,736	
Independent win (new seat)			

Lowestoft Central
Party	Candidate	Votes	%
Labour	M. Ramsay*	1,276	59.4
Alliance	Andrew Shepherd	873	40.6
Majority		403	18.8
Turnout		2,149	35.4
Registered electors		5,447	
Labour win (new seat)			

Lowestoft St Margarets
Party	Candidate	Votes	%
Labour	A. Taylor	993	56.9
Residents	R. Allen	413	23.7
Conservative	K. Tyson	340	19.5
Majority		480	33.2
Turnout		1,746	32.1
Registered electors		5,447	
Labour win (new seat)			

Normanston
Party	Candidate	Votes	%
Labour	T. Chippefield*	1,596	76.7
Conservative	P. Browne	485	23.3
Majority		1,111	53.4
Turnout		2,081	32.3
Registered electors		6,440	
Labour win (new seat)			

Oulton Broad
Party	Candidate	Votes	%
Conservative	D. Harvey	861	47.6
Labour	S. Balls*	546	30.2
Alliance	W. Wegg	403	22.3
Majority		315	17.4
Turnout		1,810	29.5
Registered electors		6,132	
Conservative win (new seat)			

Pakefield
Party	Candidate	Votes	%
Labour	J. Lark*	1,708	62.9
Conservative	S. Simpson	1,008	37.1
Majority		700	25.8
Turnout		2,716	39.3
Registered electors		6,918	
Labour win (new seat)			

Southwold
Party	Candidate	Votes	%
Conservative	F. Macdonald-Miller*	1,310	50.6
Labour	A. Child*	918	35.5
Alliance	R. Winyard	360	13.9
Majority		392	15.1
Turnout		2,588	50.9
Registered electors		5,081	
Conservative win (new seat)			

Wainford
Party	Candidate	Votes	%
Conservative	G. Farmiloe	970	55.3
Labour	A. Hutchinson	784	44.7
Majority		186	10.6
Turnout		1,754	33.7
Registered electors		5,202	
Conservative win (new seat)			

Whittington
Party	Candidate	Votes	%
Labour	J. Spottiswoode	1,134	66.4
Conservative	P. Harvey	574	33.6
Majority		560	32.8
Turnout		1,708	33.1
Registered electors		5,155	
Labour win (new seat)			
