= List of electoral wards in Suffolk =

This is a list of electoral divisions and wards in the ceremonial county of Suffolk in the East of England. All changes since the re-organisation of local government following the passing of the Local Government Act 1972 are shown. The number of councillors elected for each electoral division or ward is shown in brackets.

== County council ==
=== Suffolk ===
Electoral Divisions from 1 April 1974 (first election 12 April 1973) to 2 May 1985:

1. Aldeburgh (1)
2. Beccles (2)
3. Blyth No. 1 (1)
4. Blyth No. 2 (1)
5. Blyth No. 3 (1)
6. Bungay (1)
7. Bury St Edmunds No. 1 (Abbeygate And (1)
8. Bury St Edmunds No. 2 (Risbygate And (1)
9. Bury St Edmunds No. 3 (Northgate And (1)
10. Bury St Edmunds No. 4 (Southgate And (1)
11. Clare No. 1 (1)
12. Clare No. 2 (1)
13. Cosford No. 1 (1)
14. Cosford No. 2 (1)
15. Deben No. 1 (1)
16. Deben No. 2 (1)
17. Deben No. 3 (1)
18. Deben No. 4 (1)
19. Deben No. 5 (1)
20. Felixtowe No. 1 (East & South East) (1)
21. Felixtowe No. 2 (North) (1)
22. Felixtowe No. 3 (South & West) (1)
23. Gipping No. 1 (1)
24. Gipping No. 2 (1)
25. Gipping No. 3 (1)
26. Gipping No. 4 (1)
27. Hadleigh (1)
28. Halesworth (1)
29. Hartismere No. 1 (1)
30. Hartismere No. 2 (1)
31. Hartismere No. 3 (1)
32. Haverhill (1)
33. Ipswich (Bixley) (2)
34. Ipswich (Bridge) (2)
35. Ipswich (Broom Hill) (1)
36. Ipswich (Chantry) (2)
37. Ipswich (Gainsborough) (1)
38. Ipswich (Middle) (1)
39. Ipswich (Racecourse) (1)
40. Ipswich (Rushmere) (1)
41. Ipswich (St Clements) (1)
42. Ipswich (St Johns) (1)
43. Ipswich (St Margarets) (1)
44. Ipswich (Valley) (1)
45. Ipswich (Westbourne) (1)
46. Ipswich (Whitton) (2)
47. Leiston-cum-Sizewell (1)
48. Lothingland No. 1 (1)
49. Lothingland No. 2 (1)
50. Lothingland No. 3 (1)
51. Lowestoft No. 1 (Carlton) (2)
52. Lowestoft No. 2 (Oulton) (1)
53. Lowestoft No. 3 (Pakefield) (1)
54. Lowestoft No. 4 (Kirkley & St John (1)
55. Lowestoft No. 5 (Gunton) (1)
56. Lowestoft No. 6 (Central & Waveney) (1)
57. Lowestoft No. 7 (Roman Hill & St M (1)
58. Melford No. 1 (1)
59. Melford No. 2 (1)
60. Melford No. 3 (1)
61. Mildenhall No. 1 (1)
62. Mildenhall No. 2 (1)
63. Mildenhall No. 3 (1)
64. Newmarket No. 1 (1)
65. Newmarket No. 2 (1)
66. Samford No. 1 (1)
67. Samford No. 2 (1)
68. Samford No. 3 (1)
69. Stowmarket (1)
70. Sudbury (1)
71. Thedwastre No. 1 (1)
72. Thedwastre No. 2 (1)
73. Thingoe No. 1 (1)
74. Thingoe No. 2 (1)
75. Thingoe No. 3 (1)
76. Woodbridge (1)

Electoral Divisions from 2 May 1985 to 5 May 2005:

1. Abbeygate & Eastgate (1)
2. Beccles (1)
3. Belstead Brook (1)
4. Bixley (1)
5. Blackbourn (1)
6. Blything (1)
7. Bosmere (1)
8. Brandon (1)
9. Brett (1)
10. Bridge (1)
11. Broom Hill (1)
12. Bungay (1)
13. Carlford (1)
14. Castle Hill (1)
15. Chantry (1)
16. Clare (1)
17. Clay Hills (1)
18. Colneis (1)
19. Cosford (1)
20. Exning (1)
21. Felixstowe Ferry (1)
22. Felixstowe Landguard (1)
23. Felixstowe Walton (1)
24. Framlingham (1)
25. Gainsborough (1)
26. Gipping Valley (1)
27. Great Cornard (1)
28. Gunton (1)
29. Hadleigh (1)
30. Halesworth (1)
31. Hartismere (1)
32. Haverhill North (1)
33. Haverhill South (1)
34. Hoxne (1)
35. Icknield (1)
36. Ipswich St Margarets (1)
37. Ipswich Town (1)
38. Kesgrave & Martlesham (1)
39. Lothingland North (1)
40. Lothingland South (1)
41. Lowestoft Central (1)
42. Lowestoft St Margarets (1)
43. Melford (1)
44. Mildenhall (1)
45. Newmarket Town (1)
46. Normanston (1)
47. Northgate & St Olaves (1)
48. Oulton Broad (1)
49. Pakefield (1)
50. Peninsula (1)
51. Plomesgate (1)
52. Priory Heath (1)
53. Risbridge (1)
54. Risbygate & Sextons (1)
55. Rowheath (1)
56. Rushmere (1)
57. Samford (1)
58. Southgate & Westgate (1)
59. Southwold (1)
60. Sprites (1)
61. St Clements (1)
62. St Johns (1)
63. Stoke Park (1)
64. Stour Valley (1)
65. Stowmarket St Marys (1)
66. Stowmarket St Peters (1)
67. Sudbury (1)
68. Thedwastre North (1)
69. Thedwastre South (1)
70. Thingoe North (1)
71. Thingoe South (1)
72. Thredling (1)
73. Upper Gipping (1)
74. Wainford (1)
75. Whitehouse (1)
76. Whittington (1)
77. Whitton (1)
78. Wickham (1)
79. Wilford (1)
80. Woodbridge (1)

Electoral Divisions from 5 May 2005 to 7 May 2026:

1. Aldeburgh & Leiston (1)
2. Beccles (2)
3. Belstead Brook (1)
4. Bixley (1)
5. Blackbourn (1)
6. Blything (1)
7. Bosmere (1)
8. Brandon (1)
9. Bridge (1)
10. Bungay (1)
11. Carlford (1)
12. Chantry (2)
13. Clare (1)
14. Cosford (1)
15. Eastgate & Moreton Hall (1)
16. Exning & Newmarket (1)
17. Felixstowe Coastal (2)
18. Felixstowe North & Trimley (1)
19. Framlingham (1)
20. Gainsborough (1)
21. Gipping Valley (1)
22. Great Cornard (1)
23. Gunton (2)
24. Hadleigh (1)
25. Halesworth (1)
26. Hardwick (1)
27. Hartismere (1)
28. Haverhill Cangle (2)
29. Haverhill East & Kedington (1)
30. Hoxne & Eye (1)
31. Kesgrave & Rushmere St Andrew (2)
32. Kessingland & Southwold (1)
33. Lowestoft South (2)
34. Martlesham (1)
35. Melford (1)
36. Mildenhall (1)
37. Newmarket & Red Lodge (1)
38. Oulton (2)
39. Pakefield (2)
40. Peninsula (1)
41. Priory Heath (1)
42. Row Heath (1)
43. Rushmere (1)
44. Samford (1)
45. St Helen's (1)
46. St John's (1)
47. St Margaret’s & Westgate (2)
48. Stour Valley (1)
49. Stowmarket North & Stowupland (1)
50. Stowmarket South (1)
51. Sudbury (1)
52. Sudbury East & Waldingfield (1)
53. Thedwastre North (1)
54. Thedwastre South (1)
55. Thingoe North (1)
56. Thingoe South (1)
57. Thredling (1)
58. Tower (2)
59. Upper Gipping (1)
60. Whitehouse & Whitton (2)
61. Wickham (1)
62. Wilford (1)
63. Woodbridge (1)

Electoral Divisions from 7 May 2026 to present:

1. Abbeygate & Minden (1)
2. Aldeburgh & Leiston (1)
3. Barrow & Thingoe (1)
4. Beccles & Kessingland (1)
5. Belstead Hills (1)
6. Bixley (1)
7. Blackbourn (1)
8. Blyth Estuary (1)
9. Bosmere (1)
10. Brandon (1)
11. Bridge (1)
12. Brook (1)
13. Bungay (1)
14. Carlford (1)
15. Carlton & Whitton (1)
16. Carlton Colville (1)
17. Clare (1)
18. Constable (1)
19. Cornard & Sudbury East (1)
20. Cosford (1)
21. Eastgate & Moreton Hall (1)
22. Exning & Newmarket (1)
23. Felixstowe Clifflands (1)
24. Felixstowe Maritime (1)
25. Framlingham & Wickham Market (1)
26. Gainsborough (1)
27. Gipping (1)
28. Gipping Valley (1)
29. Gunton (1)
30. Hadleigh (1)
31. Halesworth (1)
32. Harbour (1)
33. Hardwick (1)
34. Hartismere (1)
35. Haverhill East & Rural (1)
36. Haverhill North West & Withersfield (1)
37. Haverhill South (1)
38. Hoxne & Eye (1)
39. Kesgrave (1)
40. Kirkley & Pakefield (1)
41. Martlesham (1)
42. Melford (1)
43. Mildenhall (1)
44. Newmarket & Red Lodge (1)
45. Oulton (1)
46. Oulton Broad & Normanston (1)
47. Peninsula (1)
48. Priory Heath (1)
49. Row Heath (1)
50. Rushmere (1)
51. Rushmere St Andrew (1)
52. Saxmundham & District (1)
53. St Clement’s (1)
54. St Margaret’s (1)
55. St Olaves & Tollgate (1)
56. Stour Valley (1)
57. Stowmarket East (1)
58. Stowmarket West (1)
59. Sudbury West (1)
60. Thedwastre North (1)
61. Thedwastre South (1)
62. Thredling (1)
63. Upper Gipping (1)
64. Walton & Trimleys (1)
65. Westbourne (1)
66. Westgate (1)
67. Whitton (1)
68. Wilford (1)
69. Woodbridge (1)

== District councils ==
=== Babergh ===
Wards from 1 April 1974 (first election 7 June 1973) to 3 May 1979:

Wards from 3 May 1979 to 1 May 2003:

Wards from 1 May 2003 to 2 May 2019:

1. Alton (2)
2. Berners (2)
3. Boxford (1)
4. Brett Vale (1)
5. Brook (2)
6. Bures St Mary (1)
7. Chadacre (1)
8. Dodnash (2)
9. Glemsford & Stanstead (2)
10. Great Cornard North (2)
11. Great Cornard South (2)
12. Hadleigh North (2)
13. Hadleigh South (2)
14. Holbrook (1)
15. Lavenham (1)
16. Leavenheath (1)
17. Long Melford (2)
18. Lower Brett (1)
19. Mid Samford (2)
20. Nayland (1)
21. North Cosford (1)
22. Pinewood (2)
23. South Cosford (1)
24. Sudbury East (2)
25. Sudbury North (2)
26. Sudbury South (2)
27. Waldingfield (2)

Wards from 2 May 2019 to present:

1. Assington (1)
2. Box Vale (1)
3. Brantham (1)
4. Brett Vale (1)
5. Bures St Mary & Nayland (1)
6. Capel St Mary (1)
7. Chadacre (2)
8. Copdock & Washbrook (1)
9. East Bergholt (1)
10. Ganges (1)
11. Great Cornard (3)
12. Hadleigh North (1)
13. Hadleigh South (2)
14. Lavenham (2)
15. Long Melford (2)
16. North West Cosford (1)
17. Orwell (1)
18. South East Cosford (1)
19. Sproughton & Pinewood (2)
20. Stour (1)
21. Sudbury North East (1)
22. Sudbury North West (2)
23. Sudbury South East (1)
24. Sudbury South West (1)

=== (formerly) Forest Heath ===
Wards from 1 April 1974 (first election 7 June 1973) to 3 May 1979:

Wards from 3 May 1979 to 1 May 2003:

Wards from 1 May 2003 to 1 April 2019:

1. All Saints (2)
2. Brandon East (3)
3. Brandon West (2)
4. Eriswell & The Rows (2)
5. Exning (1)
6. Great Heath (2)
7. Iceni (1)
8. Lakenheath (2)
9. Manor (1)
10. Market (2)
11. Red Lodge (2)
12. St Mary's (3)
13. Severals (3)
14. South (1)

=== Ipswich ===
Wards from 1 April 1974 (first election 7 June 1973) to 3 May 1979:

Wards from 3 May 1979 to 2 May 2002:

Wards from 2 May 2002 to present:

1. Alexandra (3)
2. Bixley (3)
3. Bridge (3)
4. Castle Hill (3)
5. Gainsborough (3)
6. Gipping (3)
7. Holywells (3)
8. Priory Heath (3)
9. Rushmere (3)
10. St John's (3)
11. St Margaret's (3)
12. Sprites (3)
13. Stoke Park (3)
14. Westgate (3)
15. Whitehouse (3)
16. Whitton (3)

=== Mid Suffolk ===
Wards from 1 April 1974 (first election 7 June 1973) to 3 May 1979:

Wards from 3 May 1979 to 1 May 2003:

Wards from 1 May 2003 to 2 May 2019:

1. Bacton & Old Newton (1)
2. Badwell Ash (1)
3. Barking & Somersham (1)
4. Bramford & Blakenham (2)
5. Claydon & Barham (2)
6. Debenham (1)
7. Elmswell & Norton (2)
8. Eye (1)
9. Fressingfield (1)
10. Gislingham (1)
11. Haughley & Wetherden (1)
12. Helmingham & Coddenham (1)
13. Hoxne (1)
14. Mendlesham (1)
15. Needham Market (2)
16. Onehouse (1)
17. Palgrave (1)
18. Rattlesden (1)
19. Rickinghall & Walsham (2)
20. Ringshall (1)
21. Stowmarket Central (2)
22. Stowmarket North (3)
23. Stowmarket South (2)
24. Stowupland (1)
25. Stradbroke & Laxfield (1)
26. The Stonhams (1)
27. Thurston & Hessett (2)
28. Wetheringsett (1)
29. Woolpit (1)
30. Worlingworth (1)

Wards from 2 May 2019 to present:

1. Bacton (1)
2. Battisford & Ringshall (1)
3. Blakenham (1)
4. Bramford (1)
5. Chilton (2)
6. Claydon & Barham (2)
7. Combs Ford (2)
8. Debenham (1)
9. Elmswell & Woolpit (2)
10. Eye (1)
11. Fressingfield (1)
12. Gislingham (1)
13. Haughley, Stowupland & Wetherden (2)
14. Hoxne & Worlingworth (1)
15. Mendlesham (1)
16. Needham Market (2)
17. Onehouse (1)
18. Palgrave (1)
19. Rattlesden (1)
20. Rickinghall (1)
21. St Peter’s (1)
22. Stonham (1)
23. Stow Thorney (2)
24. Stradbroke & Laxfield (1)
25. Thurston (2)
26. Walsham-le-Willows (1)

=== (formerly) St Edmundsbury ===
Wards from 1 April 1974 (first election 7 June 1973) to 3 May 1979:

Wards from 3 May 1979 to 1 May 2003:

Wards from 1 May 2003 to 1 April 2019:

1. Abbeygate (2)
2. Bardwell (1)
3. Barningham (1)
4. Barrow (1)
5. Cavendish (1)
6. Chedburgh (1)
7. Clare (1)
8. Eastgate (1)
9. Fornham (1)
10. Great Barton (1)
11. Haverhill East (3)
12. Haverhill North (3)
13. Haverhill South (2)
14. Haverhill West (2)
15. Horringer & Whelnetham (1)
16. Hundon (1)
17. Ixworth (1)
18. Kedington (1)
19. Minden (2)
20. Moreton Hall (3)
21. Northgate (1)
22. Pakenham (1)
23. Risby (1)
24. Risbygate (2)
25. Rougham (1)
26. St Olaves (2)
27. Southgate (2)
28. Stanton (1)
29. Westgate (2)
30. Wickhambrook (1)
31. Withersfield (1)

=== (formerly) Suffolk Coastal ===
Wards from 1 April 1974 (first election 7 June 1973) to 5 May 1983:

Wards from 5 May 1983 to 1 May 2003:

Wards from 1 May 2003 to 7 May 2015:

1. Aldeburgh (2)
2. Earl Soham (1)
3. Farlingaye (1)
4. Felixstowe East (2)
5. Felixstowe North (2)
6. Felixstowe South (2)
7. Felixstowe South East (2)
8. Felixstowe West (3)
9. Framlingham (2)
10. Grundisburgh (1)
11. Hacheston (1)
12. Hollesley with Eyke (1)
13. Kesgrave East (3)
14. Kesgrave West (2)
15. Kyson (1)
16. Leiston (3)
17. Martlesham (2)
18. Melton & Ufford (2)
19. Nacton (2)
20. Orford & Tunstall (1)
21. Otley (1)
22. Peasenhall (1)
23. Rendlesham (1)
24. Riverside (1)
25. Rushmere St Andrew (3)
26. Saxmundham (2)
27. Seckford (1)
28. Snape (1)
29. Sutton (1)
30. Trimleys with Kirton (3)
31. Walberswick & Wenhaston (1)
32. Wickham Market (1)
33. Witnesham (1)
34. Yoxford (1)

Wards from 7 May 2015 to 31 March 2019:

1. Aldeburgh (2)
2. Deben (1)
3. Felixstowe East (2)
4. Felixstowe North (2)
5. Felixstowe South (2)
6. Felixstowe West (2)
7. Framlingham (2)
8. Fynn Valley (1)
9. Grundisburgh (1)
10. Hacheston (1)
11. Kesgrave East (2)
12. Kesgrave West (2)
13. Kirton (1)
14. Leiston (2)
15. Martlesham (2)
16. Melton (2)
17. Nacton & Purdis Farm (1)
18. Orford & Eyke (1)
19. Peasenhall & Yoxford (1)
20. Rendlesham (1)
21. Saxmundham (2)
22. The Trimleys (2)
23. Tower (2)
24. Wenhaston & Westleton (1)
25. Wickham Market (1)
26. Woodbridge (3)

On 1 April 2019, the Districts of Suffolk Coastal and Waveney merged, to form East Suffolk District Council.

=== (formerly) Waveney ===
Wards from 1 April 1974 (first election 7 June 1973) to 5 May 1983:

Wards from 5 May 1983 to 2 May 2002:

Wards from 2 May 2002 to 31 March 2019:

1. Beccles North (2)
2. Beccles South (2)
3. Blything (1)
4. Bungay (2)
5. Carlton (2)
6. Carlton Colville (3)
7. Gunton & Corton (2)
8. Halesworth (2)
9. Harbour (3)
10. Kessingland (2)
11. Kirkley (3)
12. Lothingland (1)
13. Normanston (3)
14. Oulton (2)
15. Oulton Broad (2)
16. Pakefield (3)
17. Southwold & Reydon (2)
18. St Margaret's (3)
19. The Saints (1)
20. Wainford (1)
21. Whitton (3)
22. Worlingham (2)
23. Wrentham (1)

On 1 April 2019, the Districts of Suffolk Coastal and Waveney merged, to form East Suffolk District Council.

=== East Suffolk ===
Following the merger of Waveney and Suffolk Coastal district councils on 1 April 2019, to form East Suffolk District, the council consists of 29 wards, represented by 55 councillors.

Wards from 1 April 2019 to present:

1. Aldeburgh & Leiston(3)
2. Beccles & Worlingham(3)
3. Bungay & Wainford(2)
4. Carlford & Fynn Valley(2)
5. Carlton & Whitton(2)
6. Carlton Colville(2)
7. Deben(1)
8. Eastern Felixstowe(3)
9. Framlingham(2)
10. Gunton & St. Margaret's(2)
11. Halesworth & Blything(2)
12. Harbour & Normanston(3)
13. Kelsale & Yoxford(1)
14. Kesgrave(3)
15. Kessingland(1)
16. Kirkley & Pakefield(3)
17. Lothingland(1)
18. Martlesham & Purdis Farm(2)
19. Melton(1)
20. Orwell & Villages(2)
21. Oulton Broad(3)
22. Rendlesham & Orford(1)
23. Rushmere St. Andrew's(1)
24. Saxmundham(1)
25. Southwold(1)
26. Western Felixstowe(3)
27. Wickham Market(1)
28. Woodbridge(2)
29. Wrentham, Wangford & Westleton (1)

=== West Suffolk ===
Following the merger of St Edmundsbury Borough Council and Forest District councils on 1 April 2019, to form West Suffolk District, the council consists of 43 wards, represented by 64 councillors. Wards from 1 April 2019 to present:

1. Abbeygate
2. Bardwell
3. Barningham
4. Barrow
5. Brandon Central
6. Brandon East
7. Brandon West
8. Chedburgh and Chevington
9. Clare, Hundon and Kedington
10. Eastgate
11. Exning
12. Haverhill Central
13. Haverhill East
14. Haverhill North
15. Haverhill South
16. Haverhill South East
17. Haverhill West
18. Horringer
19. Iceni
20. Ixworth
21. Kentford and Moulton
22. Lakenheath
23. Manor
24. Mildenhall Great Heath
25. Mildenhall Kingsway and Market
26. Mildenhall Queensway
27. Minden
28. Moreton Hall
29. Newmarket East
30. Newmarket North
31. Newmarket West
32. Pakenham and Troston
33. Risby
34. Rougham
35. Southgate
36. St Olaves
37. Stanton
38. The Fornhams and Great Barton
39. The Rows
40. Tollgate
41. Westgate
42. Whepstead and Wickhambrook
43. Withersfield

== Electoral wards by parliamentary constituency ==
Wards as they existed on 1 December 2020.

=== Bury St Edmunds and Stowmarket ===
Mid Suffolk: Chilton; Combs Ford; Elmswell & Woolpit; Onehouse; Rattlesden; St. Peter’s; Stow Thorney; Thurston.

West Suffolk: Abbeygate; Bardwell; Barningham; Eastgate; Ixworth; Minden; Moreton Hall; Pakenham & Troston; Rougham; St. Olaves; Southgate; Stanton; The Fornhams & Great Barton; Tollgate; Westgate.

=== Central Suffolk and North Ipswich ===
East Suffolk: Carlford & Fynn Valley; Framlingham; Kesgrave; Rushmere St. Andrew; Wickham Market.

Ipswich: Castle Hill; Whitehouse; Whitton.

Mid Suffolk: Battisford & Ringshall; Blakenham; Bramford; Claydon & Barham; Debenham; Needham Market; Stonham.

=== Ipswich ===
Ipswich: Alexandra; Bixley; Bridge; Gainsborough; Gipping; Holywells; Priory Heath; Rushmere; St. John’s; St. Margaret’s; Sprites; Stoke Park; Westgate.

=== Lowestoft ===
East Suffolk: Beccles & Worlingham; Carlton & Whitton; Carlton Colville; Gunton & St. Margarets; Harbour & Normanston; Kessingland; Kirkley & Pakefield; Lothingland; Oulton Broad.

=== South Suffolk ===
Babergh: Assington; Box Vale; Brantham; Brett Vale; Bures St Mary & Nayland; Capel St Mary; Chadacre; Copdock & Washbrook; East Bergholt; Ganges; Great Cornard; Hadleigh North; Hadleigh South; Lavenham; Long Melford; North West Cosford; Orwell; South East Cosford; Sproughton & Pinewood; Stour; Sudbury North East; Sudbury North West; Sudbury South East; Sudbury South West.

=== Suffolk Coastal ===
East Suffolk: Aldeburgh & Leiston; Deben; Eastern Felixstowe; Kelsale & Yoxford; Martlesham & Purdis Farm; Melton; Orwell & Villages; Rendlesham & Orford; Saxmundham; Southwold; Western Felixstowe; Woodbridge; Wrentham, Wangford & Westleton.

=== Waveney Valley (part) ===
East Suffolk: Bungay & Wainford; Halesworth & Blything.

Mid Suffolk: Bacton; Eye; Fressingfield; Gislingham; Haughley, Stowupland & Wetherden; Hoxne & Worlingworth; Mendlesham; Palgrave; Rickinghall; Stradbroke & Laxfield; Walsham-le-Willows.

=== West Suffolk ===
West Suffolk: Barrow; Brandon Central; Brandon East; Brandon West; Chedburgh & Chevington; Clare, Hundon & Kedington; Exning; Haverhill Central; Haverhill East; Haverhill North; Haverhill South; Haverhill South East; Haverhill West; Horringer; Iceni; Kentford & Moulton; Lakenheath; Manor; Mildenhall Great Heath; Mildenhall Kingsway & Market; Mildenhall Queensway; Newmarket East; Newmarket North; Newmarket West; Risby; The Rows; Whepstead & Wickhambrook; Withersfield.

== See also ==
- List of parliamentary constituencies in Suffolk
