= South East Area, Ipswich =

Administrative area of Ipswich, England

Coordinates: 52°02′21″N 1°10′36″E

The South East Area, Ipswich is one of five administrative areas in Ipswich, through which Ipswich Borough Council divides its spending and enables feedback from local residents, businesses and community groups.

The area is composed of three wards, each represented by three councillors. Each ward is also a Middle Layer Super Output Area (MSOA). As of the 2023 Ipswich Borough Council election, the councillors are as follows:

Ward	Councillor	Councillor	Councillor	MSOA
Gainsborough	James Whatling	Lynne Mortimer	Martin Cook	Ipswich 016
Holywells	Nic El-Safty	George Lankester	Cathy Frost	Ipswich 011
Priory Heath	Roxanne Downes	Owen Bartholomew	Ruman Muhith	Ipswich 014

These Councillors form the South East Area Committee of which George Lankester is the chair. Three Suffolk County Council Councillors are co-opted members of the committee. The divisions they represent are either fully or partially in the South East Area.:

District	Councillor
Gainsborough Division, Suffolk	Elizabeth Harsant
Priory Heath Division, Suffolk	Lucy Smith
St Helen's Division, Suffolk	Elizabeth Johnson

The area is also covered by a Neighbourhood Watch network which comprises 35 neighbourhood watch schemes.
