= Thingoe North Division, Suffolk =

Electoral division of Suffolk, England

Thingoe North
- County Council constituency for the Suffolk County Council
- District: West Suffolk
- Region: East of England
- Population: 10,291 (2019)
- Electorate: 7,363 (2021)
- Major settlements: Fornham All Saints, Fornham St Martin, Great Barton

Current constituency
- Created: 1985
- Seats: 1
- Councillor: Beccy Hopfensperger (Conservative)
- Local council: West Suffolk Council
- Created from: Thingoe No. 2

Thingoe North Division is an electoral division in Suffolk which returns one county councillor to Suffolk County Council.

== History ==
The division has been held by Conservative party since its formation at the 1985 United Kingdom local elections.

== Geography ==
Its made up of the villages surrounding the Northern half of Bury St Edmunds and consists of the West Suffolk council wards of The Fornhams & Great Barton, Pakenham & Troston, and Risby excluding the parish of Icklingham which is part of Row Heath Division.

=== Parishes ===
The division is made up of 18 civil parishes plus the Western half of Honington.

- Ampton
- Culford
- Flempton
- Fornham All Saints
- Fornham St Genevieve
- Fornham St Martin
- Great Barton
- Great Livermere
- Hengrave
- Honington excluding the Eastern part of the parish which falls in the Blackbourne Division
- Ingham
- Lackford
- Little Livermere
- Pakenham
- Risby
- Timworth
- Troston
- West Stow
- Wordwell

== Members for Thingoe North ==
Member	Party	Term
Cecil Salton	Conservative	1985–1989
Jose Pereira	Conservative	1989–1997
Simon Pott	Conservative	1997–2001
Valerie White	Conservative	2001–2005
Beccy Hopfensperger	Conservative	2005–present

== Election results ==
=== Elections in the 2020s ===
2021 Suffolk County Council election: Thingoe North
Party	Candidate	Votes	%	±%
Conservative	Beccy Hopfensperger *	1,961	64.7	▼8.1
Labour	Katie Parker	471	15.5	▼0.5
Green	Oliver King	369	12.2	N/A
Liberal Democrats	Ian Chapman	229	7.6	▼3.5
Majority		1,490	49.1	▼7.6
Turnout		3,052	41.5	▲3.1
Registered electors		7,363		
Conservative hold		Swing	▼3.8	

=== Elections in the 2010s ===
2017 Suffolk County Council election: Thingoe North
Party	Candidate	Votes	%	±%
Conservative	Beccy Hopfensperger *	1,989	72.9	+19.2
Labour Co-op	Frederick Rowell	439	16.1	+7.6
Liberal Democrats	Peter Turner	302	11.1	N/A
Majority		1,550	56.8	+23.1
Turnout		2,730	38.2	+5.3
Registered electors		7,144		
Conservative hold		Swing	+5.8	

2013 Suffolk County Council election: Thingoe North
Party	Candidate	Votes	%	±%
Conservative	Beccy Hopfensperger *	1,360	53.7	–4.8
UKIP	Linda Redford	506	20.0	+14.9
Independent	Susan Glossop	278	11.0	N/A
Labour	Brian Turnbull	216	8.5	+1.5
Green	Natasha Ereira-Guyer	173	6.8	N/A
Majority		854	33.7	+9.8
Turnout		2,533	33.0	
Registered electors		7,666		
Conservative hold		Swing		

=== Elections in the 2000s ===
2009 Suffolk County Council election: Thingoe North
Party	Candidate	Votes	%	±%
Conservative	Beccy Hopfensperger *	1,732	58.5	+4.8
Liberal Democrats	David Chappell	1,024	34.6	N/A
Labour	Bob Cockle	207	7.0	−1.5
Majority		708	23.9	
Turnout		2,533	33.0	
Registered electors		7,646		
Conservative hold		Swing		

2005 Suffolk County Council election
Party	Candidate	Votes	%	±%
Conservative	Beccy Hopfensperger	2,538	51.8	
Liberal Democrats	Christopher Tidman	1,076	22.0	
Labour	David Dawson	1,038	21.2	
UKIP	Maureen Chessell	248	5.1	
Majority		1,462	29.8	
Turnout		4,900		
Registered electors		6,206		
Conservative hold		Swing		

2001 Suffolk County Council election: Thingoe North
Party	Candidate	Votes	%	±%
Conservative	Valerie White	2,520	52.5	
Labour	David Dawson	1,316	27.4	
Liberal Democrats	Lisa Couper	964	20.1	
Majority		1,204	25.1	
Turnout		4,800	68.0	
Registered electors		7,054		
Conservative hold		Swing		

=== Elections in the 1990s ===
1997 Suffolk County Council election: Thingoe North
Party	Candidate	Votes	%	±%
Conservative	Simon Pott	2,560	49.3	
Labour	Robert Cockle	1,573	30.3	
Liberal Democrats	Mary Black	1,063	20.5	
Majority		987	19.0	
Turnout			73.5	
Registered electors		7,069		
Conservative hold		Swing		

1993 Suffolk County Council election: Thingoe North
Party	Candidate	Votes	%	±%
Conservative	J Pereira *	1,386	56.1	
Liberal Democrats	Mary Black	548	22.2	
Labour	R Bridge	537	21.7	
Majority		838	33.9	
Turnout		2,471	36.4	
Registered electors		6,797		
Conservative hold		Swing		

=== Elections in the 1980s ===
1989 Suffolk County Council election: Thingoe North
Party	Candidate	Votes	%	±%
Conservative	J Pereira	1,720	71.0	
Labour	F Roberts	704	29.0	
Majority		1,016	41.9	
Turnout		2,424	36.8	
Registered electors		6,595		
Conservative hold		Swing		

1985 Suffolk County Council election: Thingoe North
Party	Candidate	Votes	%
Conservative	C Salton *	1,720	71.0
Alliance	R Hartland	797	30.9
Labour	P Williams	288	11.2
Ecology	R Anstee-Parry	149	5.8
Majority		923	35.8
Turnout		2,576	42.2
Registered electors		6,100	
Conservative win (new seat)			
