= St Helen's Division, Suffolk =

Electoral division of Suffolk, England

St Helen's
- County Council constituency for the Suffolk County Council
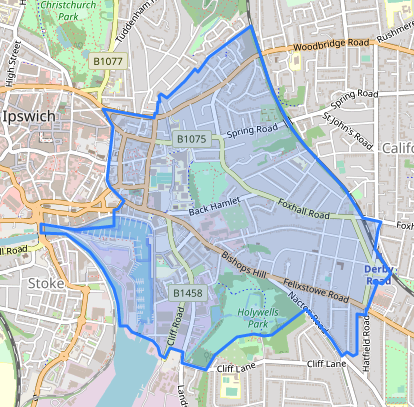
- St Helen's Electoral Division
- District: Ipswich
- Region: East of England
- Population: 12,212 (2019)
- Electorate: 8,405 (2021)
- Major settlements: Waterfront, University of Suffolk

Current constituency
- Created: 2005
- Seats: 1
- Councillor: Elizabeth Farrow (Labour)
- Local council: Ipswich Borough Council
- Created from: Ipswich Town, St Clement’s
- Replaced by: Gainsborough, St Clement’s

St Helen's Division is an electoral division of Suffolk which returns one county councillor to Suffolk County Council.

== Geography ==
Part of the division is located in the South East Area of Ipswich and comprises part of Alexandra and Holywells wards of Ipswich Borough Council. It was created in 2004 following recommendations from the Boundary Committee for England that the proposed University Division be renamed St. Helen's Division.

== History ==
It is set to be replaced in 2025 by Gainsborough and the reformed St Clement’s division.

== Members for St Helen's ==
Member	Party	Term
Kevan Lim	Labour	2005–2009
Jane Chambers	Liberal Democrats	2009–2013
Mandy Gaylard	Labour	2013–2021
Elizabeth Farrow	Labour	2021–present

== Election results ==
=== Elections in the 2020s ===
2021 Suffolk County Council election: St Helen's
Party	Candidate	Votes	%	±%
Labour	Elizabeth Johnson	1,426	47.3	–7.4
Conservative	Sachin Karale	1,009	33.5	+6.0
Green	Tom Wilmot	368	12.2	+6.3
Liberal Democrats	Paul Daley	212	7.0	–1.3
Majority		417	13.8	
Turnout		3,038	36.1	
Registered electors		8,405		
Labour hold		Swing		
