= Cosford Division, Suffolk =

Electoral division in Suffolk

Cosford
- County Council constituency for the Suffolk County Council
- District: Babergh
- Region: East of England
- Population: 8,485 (2019)
- Electorate: 7,076 (2021)
- Major settlements: Bildeston, Lavenham

Current constituency
- Created: 1985
- Seats: 1
- Councillor: Robert Lindsay (Green)
- Local council: Babergh District Council
- Created from: Cosford No. 1

Cosford Division is an electoral division in Babergh District, Suffolk which returns a single County Councillor to Suffolk County Council.

== Geography ==
It is a largely rural division, covering the north of Babergh. There is a much lower than average proportion of people of working age and a higher than average proportion of people over the age of 50.

== History ==
For much of its history the division has been held by the Conservatives (including by Council leader Jeremy Pembroke), however in 2017 it was won by the Greens.

== Boundaries and boundary changes ==
=== 1985–2005 ===
- Babergh District Wards of Boxford, Elmsett and Polstead & Layham, as well the parishes of Kersey and Lindsey.

=== 2005–present ===
- Babergh District Wards of Brett Vale, Lavenham, North Cosford and South Cosford.

== Members for Cosford ==
Member	Party	Term
W Crockatt	Conservative	1985–1989
D Pembroke	Conservative	1989–1993
Tony Bailey-Smith	Conservative	1993–1994/96
David Everett	Liberal Democrats	1994/96–1997
Vivienne Hoy	Liberal Democrats	1997–2001
Jeremy Pembroke	Conservative	2001–2013
Jenny Antill	Conservative	2013–2017
Robert Lindsay	Green	2017–present

== Election results ==
=== Elections in the 2020s ===
2021 Suffolk County Council election: Cosford
Party	Candidate	Votes	%	±%
Green	Robert Lindsay *	2,122	62.1	+13.8
Conservative	Jordon Millward	1,178	34.5	–10.5
Labour	Christopher Mills	115	3.4	+0.3
Majority		944	27.6	+24.3
Turnout		3,434	48.5	–0.2
Registered electors		7,076		+138
Green hold		Swing	+12.2	

=== Elections in the 2010s ===
2017 Suffolk County Council election: Cosford
Party	Candidate	Votes	%	±%
Green	Robert Lindsay	1,630	48.4	+8.0
Conservative	Philip Mutton	1,519	45.1	–6.8
UKIP	Leon Stedman	115	3.4	N/A
Labour	Rickaby Shearly-Sanders	106	3.1	–4.6
Majority		111	3.3	–8.2
Turnout		3,370	47.8	+6.1
Registered electors		6,938		+202
Green gain from Conservative		Swing	+7.4	

Preceded by Thedwastre North	Division held by the Opposition leader of SCC; 2002–2005	Succeeded by Chantry
Preceded by Priory Heath	Division held by the Leader of SCC; 2005–2011	Succeeded by Beccles
Preceded by St John's	Division held by the Opposition leader of SCC; 2021–present	Incumbent
