= Bridge Division, Suffolk =

Electoral division of Suffolk, England

Bridge
- County Council constituency for the Suffolk County Council
- District: Ipswich
- Region: East of England
- Population: 13,256 (2019)
- Electorate: 8,351 (2021)
- Major settlements: Ipswich Town Centre, Maidenhall, Stoke

Current constituency
- Created: 1973
- Seats: 1
- Councillor: Rob Bridgeman (Labour)
- Local council: Ipswich Borough Council

Bridge Division is an electoral division of Suffolk which returns one county councillor to Suffolk County Council.

== Geography ==
It is located in the South West Area of Ipswich and consists of all of Bridge Ward and part of Alexandra Ward of Ipswich Borough Council.

== Members for Bridge ==
=== Two Seats (1973–85) ===
Member	Party	Term	Member	Party	Term
V Girling	Labour	1973–1981	P Barker	Labour	1973–1977
V Girling	Labour	1973–1981	L Knights	Conservative	1977–1981
L Cogan	Labour	1981–1985	A White	Labour	1981–1985

=== One Seat (1985–present) ===
Member	Party	Term
W Clark	Labour	1985–1989
Ken Doran	Labour	1989–1999
Harold Mangar	Labour	1999–2009
Bryony Rudkin	Labour	2009–2017
Jack Abbott	Labour	2017–2021
Rob Bridgeman	Labour	2021–present

== Election results ==
=== Elections in the 2020s ===
2021 Suffolk County Council election: Bridge
Party	Candidate	Votes	%	±%
Labour	Rob Bridgeman	1,095	43.3	▼6.7
Conservative	Mike Scanes	1,004	39.7	▲9.3
Green	Brieanna Jade Skie Patmore	292	11.5	▲4.1
Liberal Democrats	Martin Hore	139	5.5	0.0
Majority		91	4.6	▼15.0
Turnout		2,560	30.7	▲3.7
Registered electors		8,386		▲704
Labour hold		Swing	–7.5	
