= Chantry Division, Suffolk =

Electoral division of Suffolk, England

Chantry
- County Council constituency for the Suffolk County Council
- District: Ipswich
- Region: East of England
- Population: 23,059 (2019)
- Electorate: 16,785 (2021)
- Major settlements: Chantry, Stoke Park

Current constituency
- Created: 1973
- Seats: 2
- Councillor: Nadia Cenci (Conservative); Nathan Wilson (Conservative)
- Local council: Ipswich Borough Council
- Replaced by: Belstead Hills, Gipping

Chantry Division is an electoral division of Suffolk which returns two county councillors to Suffolk County Council.

== Geography ==
It is located in the South West Area of Ipswich and consists of Gipping Ward, Sprites Ward and Stoke Park Ward of Ipswich Borough Council.

== History ==
The seat had been historically a safe Labour seat however since the 2005 boundary changes it has become swing seat that the Conservative have carried twice. It is set to be replaced in 2025 by the new Belstead Hills and Gipping divisions.

== Boundaries and boundary changes ==
=== 1985–2005 ===
- Ipswich District Ward of Chantry.

=== 2005–present ===
- Ipswich District Wards of Gipping, Sprites and Stoke Park.

== Members for Chantry ==
=== Two Seats (1973–85) ===
Member	Party	Term	Member	Party	Term
A Ross	Labour	1973–1981	M Cartwright	Labour	1973–1977
A Ross	Labour	1973–1981	T Payne	Labour	1977–1985
G Building	Labour	1981–1985	T Payne	Labour	1977–1985

=== One Seat (1985–2005) ===
Member	Party	Term
J Wells	Labour	1985–1989
Susan Thomas	Labour	1989–2005

=== Two Seats (2005–present) ===
Member	Party	Term	Member	Party	Term
Keith Rawlingson	Labour	2005–2009	Bryony Rudkin	Labour	2005–2009
Paul West	Conservative	2009–2013	Peter Gardiner	Labour	2009–2021
Helen Armitage	Labour	2013–2021	Peter Gardiner	Labour	2009–2021
Nadia Cenci	Conservative	2021–present	Nathan Wilson	Conservative	2021–present

== Election results ==
=== Elections in the 2020s ===
2021 Suffolk County Council election: Chantry
Party	Candidate	Votes	%	±%
Conservative	Nadia Cenci	2,895	48.5	+8.6
Conservative	Nathan Wilson	2,337		
Labour	Helen Armitage *	2,255	37.8	–4.7
Labour	Peter Gardiner *	1,970		
Green	Martin Hynes	529	8.9	N/A
Liberal Democrats	Adam Merritt	291	4.9	–0.3
Liberal Democrats	Lucy Drake	281		
Majority		640	10.7	
Turnout		5,777	34.4	+2.9
Registered electors		16,793		
Conservative gain from Labour				
Conservative gain from Labour				

Preceded by Cosford	Division held by the Opposition leader of SCC; 2005–2009	Succeeded by Belstead Brook
