= Priory Heath Division, Suffolk =

Electoral division in Suffolk

Priory Heath
- County Council constituency for the Suffolk County Council
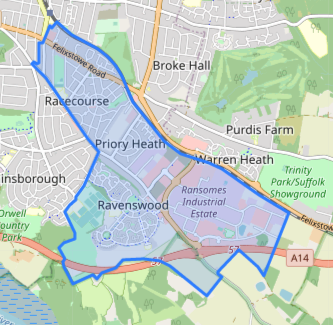
- Priory Heath Electoral Division
- District: Ipswich
- Region: East of England
- Population: 9,082 (2019)
- Electorate: 6,670 (2021)
- Major settlements: Racecourse, Ravenswood

Current constituency
- Created: 1985
- Seats: 1
- Councillor: Lucy Smith (Labour)
- Local council: Ipswich Borough Council
- Created from: Racecourse, St. Johns

Priory Heath Division is an electoral division of Suffolk, England, which returns one county councillor to Suffolk County Council.

== Geography ==
It is located in the South East Area of Ipswich and equates to Priory Heath Ward of Ipswich Borough Council.

== History ==
The Division has been historically a safe Labour seat.

== Boundaries and boundary changes ==
=== 1985–present ===
- Ipswich District Ward of Priory Heath.

== Members for Priory Heath ==
Member	Party	Term
D Sierakowski	Labour	1985–1989
R Sudds	Labour	1989–1993
Ken Wilson	Labour	1993–2001
Bryony Rudkin	Labour	2001–2005
Susan Maguire	Labour	2005–2013
Bill Quinton	Labour	2013–2023
Lucy Smith	Labour	2023–present

== Election results ==
=== Elections in the 2020s ===
Priory Heath By-Election 4 May 2023
Party	Candidate	Votes	%	±%
Labour	Lucy Smith	918	50.8	+5.1
Conservative	Gregor McNie	567	31.4	–9.1
Green	Andy Patmore	180	10.0	+1.0
Liberal Democrats	Trevor Powell	143	7.9	+3.0
Majority		351	19.4	+14.2
Turnout		1,820	27.3	
Registered electors		6,679		
Labour hold		Swing	+7.1	

2021 Suffolk County Council election: Priory Heath
Party	Candidate	Votes	%	±%
Labour	William (Bill) Quinton *	1,030	45.7	–3.8
Conservative	Edward Phillips	912	40.5	+6.3
Green	Andy Patmore	202	9.0	+5.2
Liberal Democrats	Nicholas Jacob	110	4.9	–0.1
Majority		118	5.2	–10.2
Turnout		2,267	34.0	+5.5
Registered electors		6,670		+104
Labour hold		Swing	–5.1	

Preceded by Lowestoft South	Division held by the Leader of SCC; 2003–2005	Succeeded by Cosford
