= Thingoe South Division, Suffolk =

Electoral division of Suffolk, England

Thingoe South
- County Council constituency for the Suffolk County Council
- District: West Suffolk
- Region: East of England
- Population: 9,359 (2019)
- Electorate: 7,808 (2021)
- Major settlements: Barrow, Horringer

Current constituency
- Created: 1985
- Seats: 1
- Councillor: Karen Soons (Conservative)
- Local council: West Suffolk Council
- Created from: Thingoe No. 3

Thingoe South Division is an electoral division in Suffolk which returns one county councillor to Suffolk County Council.

== History ==
The division has been held by Conservative party since its formation at the 1985 United Kingdom local elections.

== Geography ==
It is made up of the villages surrounding the Southern half of Bury St Edmunds and consists of the West Suffolk council wards of Barrow, Horringer, and Rougham along with parts of Moreton Hall, Whepstead & Wickhambrook, and Chedburgh & Chevington.

=== Parishes ===
The division is made up of 18 civil parishes.

1. Barrow
2. Bradfield Combust with Stanningfield
3. Bradfield St Clare
4. Bradfield St George
5. Chedburgh
6. Chevington
7. Denham
8. Great Whelnetham
9. Hawstead
10. Horringer
11. Ickworth
12. Little Whelnetham
13. Nowton
14. Rede
15. Rushbrooke with Rougham
16. The Saxhams
17. Westley
18. Whepstead

== Members for Thingoe South ==
Member	Party	Term
Mary MacRae	Conservative	1985–1989
Elizabeth Milburn	Conservative	1989–2005
Terry Clements	Conservative	2005–2017
Karen Soons	Conservative	2017–present

== Election results ==
=== Elections in the 2020s ===
2021 Suffolk County Council election: Thingoe South
Party	Candidate	Votes	%	±%
Conservative	Karen Soons	2,192	64.7	▼2.8
Labour	Robin Davies	470	13.9	▲0.8
Green	Vicki Martin	467	13.8	▲13.9
Liberal Democrats	Libby Brooks	230	6.8	▼7.2
Majority		1,722	50.8	▼12.1
Turnout		3,388	43.4	▲0.9
Registered electors		7,808		
Conservative hold		Swing	▼1.8	
