= Gainsborough Division, Suffolk =

Electoral division of Suffolk, England

Gainsborough
- County Council constituency for the Suffolk County Council
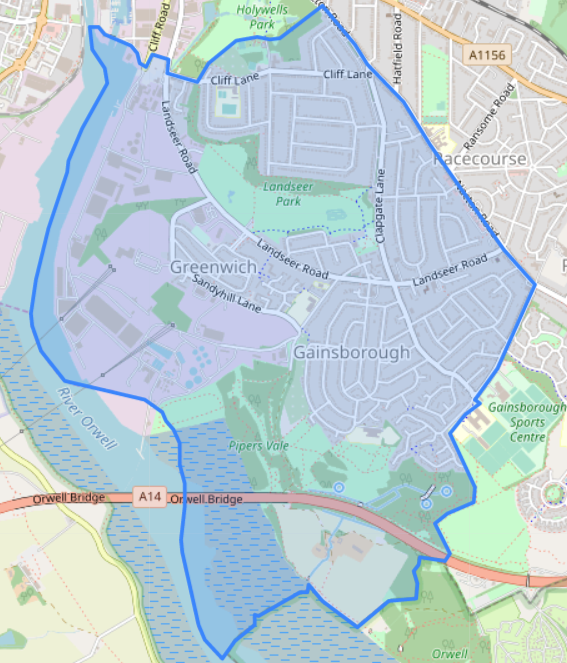
- Gainsborough Electoral Division
- District: Ipswich
- Region: East of England
- Population: 10,514 (2019)
- Electorate: 8,041 (2021)
- Major settlements: Gainsborough, Greenwich

Current constituency
- Created: 1973
- Seats: 1
- Councillor: Liz Harsant (Conservative)
- Local council: Ipswich Borough Council

Gainsborough Division is an electoral division of Suffolk which returns one county councillor to Suffolk County Council.

== Geography ==
It is located in the South East Area of Ipswich and comprises the whole of Gainsborough Ward plus part of Holywells Ward, both of which are electoral wards of Ipswich Borough Council.

== Members for Gainsborough ==
| Member | Party | Term |
|---|---|---|
| T Lambert | Labour | 1973–1977 |
| R Skerritt | Labour | 1977–1989 |
| R Crane | Labour | 1989–1993 |
| Ronald Sudds | Labour | 1993–2003 |
| Bill Quinton | Labour | 2003–2009 |
| Carol Debman | Conservative | 2009–2013 |
| Kim Cook | Labour | 2013–2021 |
| Liz Harsant | Conservative | 2021–present |

== Election results ==
=== Elections in the 2020s ===
2021 Suffolk County Council election: Gainsborough
| Party | Candidate | Votes | % | ±% |
|---|---|---|---|---|
| Conservative | Liz Harsant | 1,673 | 52.9 | +11.7 |
| Labour | Stephen Connelly | 1,162 | 36.8 | –4.5 |
| Liberal Democrats | Conrad Packwood | 254 | 8.0 | +5.1 |
| Green | Jenny Rivett | 71 | 2.2 | –2.0 |
| Majority | | 511 | 16.1 | |
| Turnout | | 3,188 | 39.6 | +7.4 |
| Registered electors | | 8,041 | | |
| Conservative gain from Labour | | Swing | +8.1 | |
