= Suffolk County Council elections =

Local government elections in Suffolk, England

Suffolk County Council in England is elected every four years. Since the last boundary changes in 2005, 75 councillors have been elected from 75 wards.

== County Council composition ==
Year	Conservative	Labour	Liberal Democrats (Note: Includes totals for the predecessors of the Liberal Democrats, the Liberal Party and SDP (both of which participated in the Alliance).)	Green	UKIP	Reform	Independents & Others	Council control after election
Local government reorganisation; council established (76 seats)
1973	47	29	3	–	–	–	3	Conservative
1977	70	9	1	0	–	–	2	Conservative
1981	45	27	0	0	–	–	4	Conservative
New division boundaries; seats increased from 76 to 80
1985	50	23	3	0	–	–	4	Conservative
1989	46	26	4	0	–	–	4	Conservative
1993	26	31	19	0	–	–	4	No overall control
1997	31	34	14	0	0	–	1	No overall control
2001	31	36	12	0	0	–	1	No overall control
New division boundaries; seats decreased from 80 to 75
2005	46	22	7	0	0	–	1	Conservative
2009	55	4	11	2	1	–	2	Conservative
2013	39	15	7	2	9	–	3	Conservative
2017	52	11	5	3	0	–	4	Conservative
2021	55	5	4	9	0	–	2	Conservative
New division boundaries; seats decreased from 75 to 70
2026 (Note: Delayed from 2025.)	9	3	2	13	0	41	2	Reform

== County result maps ==
2001 results map

2005 results map

2009 results map

2013 results map

2017 results map

2021 results map

2026 results map

== By-election results ==
=== 1993-1997 ===
Gunton By-Election 17 February 1994
Party	Candidate	Votes	%	±%
Labour	Norman Rimmell	693	41.4	+13.4
Conservative		491	29.4	–19.3
Liberal Democrats		488	29.2	+5.9
Majority		202	12.1	N/a
Turnout		1,672	31.0	–5.6
Registered electors		5,394		
Labour gain from Conservative		Swing	+16.3	

Halesworth By-Election 15 December 1994
Party	Candidate	Votes	%	±%
Labour	John Troughton	944	60.3	+11.9
Conservative		515	32.9	–8.5
Liberal Democrats		107	6.8	–3.4
Majority		429	27.4	+20.4
Turnout		1,566	28.0	–17.7
Registered electors		5,593		
Labour hold		Swing	+10.2	

Broom Hill By-Election 3 October 1996
Party	Candidate	Votes	%	±%
Labour	Keith Herod	571	41.9	+8.0
Conservative		554	40.6	–7.9
Liberal Democrats		237	17.4	–0.1
Majority		17	1.3	N/a
Turnout		1,362	26.8	–3.6
Registered electors		5,082		
Labour gain from Conservative		Swing	+7.9	

=== 1997-2001 ===
Ipswich Bridge By-Election 10 June 1999
Party	Candidate	Votes	%	±%
Labour	Harold Mangar	569	51.5	−1.5
Conservative		391	35.4	+3.4
Liberal Democrats		144	13.0	−2.0
Majority		178	16.1	
Turnout		1,104		
Labour hold		Swing		

Peninsula By-Election 6 April 2000
Party	Candidate	Votes	%	±%
Liberal Democrats	David Wood	1,193	66.3	+1.2
Conservative	Stephen Williams	504	28.0	−6.8
Green	Anthony Slade	102	5.7	+5.7
Majority		689	38.3	
Turnout		1,799	31.0	
Liberal Democrats hold		Swing		

=== 2001-2005 ===
Thedwastre South By-Election 17 January 2002
Party	Candidate	Votes	%	±%
Conservative	Jane Storey	991	47.4	+7.9
Liberal Democrats	Carol Milward	982	47.0	+8.5
Green	John Matthissen	116	5.6	+5.6
Majority		9	0.4	
Turnout		2,089	28.6	
Conservative hold		Swing		

Ipswich Town By-Election 2 May 2002
Party	Candidate	Votes	%	±%
Labour	Kevan Lim	819	53.6	−0.6
Conservative	Anthony Ramsey	369	24.3	−0.5
Liberal Democrats	Robin Whitmore	331	21.8	+1.1
Majority		450	29.6	
Turnout		1,519	24.3	
Labour hold		Swing		

Ipswich St. Clements By-Election 25 July 2002
Party	Candidate	Votes	%	±%
Conservative	Janet Sibley	645	38.0	+4.3
Labour	Neil MacDonald	588	34.6	−14.2
Liberal Democrats	Robin Whitmore	465	27.4	+9.9
Majority		57	3.4	
Turnout		1,698	29.0	
Conservative gain from Labour		Swing		

Blything By-Election 1 August 2002
Party	Candidate	Votes	%	±%
Conservative	Raeburn Leighton	989	54.5	+1.9
Liberal Democrats	Peter Perren	716	39.4	−8.0
Labour	Catherine Knight	111	6.1	+6.1
Majority		273	15.1	
Turnout		1,816	35.8	
Conservative hold		Swing		

Wickham By-Election 6 March 2003
Party	Candidate	Votes	%	±%
Conservative	Peter Bellfield	1,114	50.9	+7.2
Liberal Democrats	Ronald Else	870	39.7	+8.5
Labour	Valerie Pizzey	206	9.4	−15.8
Majority		244	11.2	
Turnout		2,190	31.2	
Conservative hold		Swing		

Gainsborough By-Election 1 May 2003
Party	Candidate	Votes	%	±%
Labour	William Quinton	711	45.5	−15.1
Conservative	Adam Ramsay	463	29.4	+4.3
Liberal Democrats	Catherine Chambers	313	20.1	+6.1
CPA	Jonathan Barnes	74	4.7	+4.7
Majority		248	15.8	
Turnout		1,561	24.5	
Labour hold		Swing		

Felixstowe Ferry By-Election 5 February 2004
Party	Candidate	Votes	%	±%
Conservative	Ann Rodwell	1,401	65.5	+12.9
Liberal Democrats	Cherrie MacGregor	456	21.3	+0.6
Labour	Harriet Bennett	281	13.1	−13.5
Majority		945	44.2	
Turnout		2,138	32.0	
Conservative hold		Swing		

Woodbridge By-Election 15 April 2004
Party	Candidate	Votes	%	±%
Conservative	Benjamin Redsell	990	43.8	+4.3
Liberal Democrats	Diana Ball	867	38.3	+9.9
Labour	Roy Burgon	194	8.6	−18.4
English Democrat	Robert Jay	139	6.1	+6.1
Green	Gordon Forbes	71	3.1	+3.1
Majority		123	5.4	
Turnout		2,261	32.0	
Conservative hold		Swing		

=== 2005-2009 ===
Stowmarket South By-Election 2 February 2006
Party	Candidate	Votes	%	±%
Conservative	Anne Whybrow	733	35.0	+0.9
Liberal Democrats	Keith Scarff	668	32.0	+9.5
Green	Twiggy Davis	354	16.9	+4.7
Labour	Duncan Macpherson	337	16.1	−15.2
Majority		65	3.0	
Turnout		2,092	29.0	
Conservative hold		Swing		

Pakefield By-Election 4 May 2006
Party	Candidate	Votes	%	±%
Conservative	Kenneth Sale	1,338	36.5	+2.8
Labour	Terence Kelly	1,097	29.9	−1.2
UKIP	Derek Hackett	592	16.1	+16.1
Liberal Democrats	Peter Guyton	397	10.8	−6.0
Green	Ann Skipper	243	6.6	−1.0
Majority		241	6.6	
Turnout		3,667	32.5	
Conservative gain from Labour		Swing		

Row Heath By-Election 8 June 2006
Party	Candidate	Votes	%	±%
Conservative	Colin Noble	1,222	61.5	+20.7
UKIP	Ian Smith	297	14.9	+5.6
Labour	David Bowman	219	11.0	−11.1
Liberal Democrats	Tim Huggan	118	5.9	−7.1
Independent	David Chandler	110	5.5	−9.3
Independent	David Hitchman	22	1.1	+1.1
Majority		925	46.6	
Turnout		1,988	27.0	
Conservative hold		Swing		

Thedwastre South By-Election 23 August 2007
Party	Candidate	Votes	%	±%
Liberal Democrats	Penny Otton	927	41.8	+7.5
Conservative	Julia Dunnicliffe	833	37.5	−9.4
Green	Cathy Cass	287	12.9	+12.9
Labour	Ron Snell	88	4.0	−14.8
UKIP	Chris Streatfield	85	3.8	+3.8
Majority		94	4.3	
Turnout		2,220	32.4	
Liberal Democrats gain from Conservative		Swing		

Stowmarket North and Stowupland By-Election 17 April 2008
Party	Candidate	Votes	%	±%
Conservative	Gary Green	834	38.8	−0.7
Liberal Democrats	Nicky Turner	781	36.3	+18.1
Green	Nigel Rozier	231	10.7	+1.6
Labour	Duncan Macpherson	190	8.8	−24.5
UKIP	Christopher Streatfield	114	5.3	+5.3
Majority		53	2.5	
Turnout		2,150	27.0	
Conservative hold		Swing		

Woodbridge By-Election 18 September 2008
Party	Candidate	Votes	%	±%
Liberal Democrats	Caroline Page	970	41.8	+2.3
Conservative	Nigel Barratt	826	35.6	−4.4
Independent	Michael Weaver	378	16.3	+16.3
Labour	Roy Burgon	147	6.3	−14.2
Majority		144	6.2	
Turnout		2,321	37.2	
Liberal Democrats gain from Conservative		Swing		

=== 2009-2013 ===
Aldeburgh and Leiston By-Election 6 May 2010
Party	Candidate	Votes	%	±%
Conservative	Richard Smith	2,240	45.5	−2.0
Independent	Joan Girling	1,439	29.2	n/a
Labour	Terry Hodgson	1,243	25.3	+12.1
Majority		801	16.3	−6.7
Turnout		5,009	66.2	+26.2
Conservative hold		Swing		

Tower By-Election 11 November 2010
Party	Candidate	Votes	%	±%
Conservative	Stefan Oliver	1,005	28.8	0.0
Independent	David Nettleton	950	27.2	+1.2
Labour	Kevin Hind	759	21.7	+12.6
Green	Pippa Judd	479	13.7	−13.4
Liberal Democrats	David Chappell	300	8.6	−0.4
Majority		55		
Turnout		3,505	20.9	
Conservative hold		Swing	−0.6	

Wilford By-Election 5 May 2011
Party	Candidate	Votes	%	±%
Conservative	Andrew Reid	1,913	55.2	−5.4
Liberal Democrats	Christine Hancock	796	23.0	−7.2
Labour	Roy Burgon	758	21.9	+12.6
Majority		1,117	32.2	+1.8
Turnout		3,495	54.1	+5.1
Conservative hold		Swing	0.9	

Kesgrave and Rushmere St Andrew By-Election 9 February 2012
Party	Candidate	Votes	%	±%
Conservative	Christopher Hudson	1,302	49.7	−7.5
Labour	Kevin Archer	804	30.7	+16.7
Liberal Democrats	Derrick Fairbrother	514	19.6	−9.3
Majority		498	19.0	−9.3
Turnout		2639	17.1	
Conservative hold		Swing	−12.1	

Bixley By-Election 3 May 2012
Party	Candidate	Votes	%	±%
Conservative	Alan Murray	866	43.8	−11.3
Labour Co-op	John Cook	566	28.6	+15.0
UKIP	Chris Streatfield	229	11.6	+11.6
Green	Barry Broom	189	9.6	−4.4
Liberal Democrats	Peter Bagnall	127	6.4	−10.9
Majority		300	15.1	−22.7
Turnout		1988	35	
Conservative hold		Swing	−13.2	

=== 2013-2017 ===
Haverhill Cangle By-Election 7 May 2015
Party	Candidate	Votes	%	±%
Conservative	Tim Marks	3,001	38.9	+4.5
UKIP	John Burns	2,313	30.0	+0.2
Labour	Maureen Byrne	2,004	26.0	+0.4
Liberal Democrats	Ken Rolph	404	5.2	−1.2
Majority		1,117	8.9	+4.3
Turnout		7,825	57.7	
Conservative hold		Swing	+2.2	

Newmarket and Red Lodge By-Election 18 February 2016
Party	Candidate	Votes	%	±%
Conservative	Robin Millar	644	39.7	−4.9
UKIP	Roger Dicker	494	30.5	+2.1
Labour	Michael Jefferys	284	17.5	−3.2
Independent	Andrew Appleby	123	7.6	+7.6
Liberal Democrats	Tim Huggan	76	4.7	−1.6
Majority		150	9.2	−7.0
Turnout		1,625	18.0	
Conservative hold		Swing	−3.5	

Bixley By-Election 5 May 2016
Party	Candidate	Votes	%	±%
Conservative	Paul West	1,117	49.7	−8.7
Labour	Rob Bridgeman	634	28.2	+3.5
UKIP	Tony Gould	344	15.3	+15.3
Liberal Democrats	Colin Boyd	154	6.8	+1.3
Majority		300	21.5	−12.2
Turnout		2,264	40.9	
Conservative hold		Swing	−6.1	

Haverhill Cangle By-Election 5 May 2016
Party	Candidate	Votes	%	±%
UKIP	John Burns	1,273	36.8	+6.8
Conservative	Margaret Marks	1,168	33.8	−5.1
Labour	David Smith	838	24.2	−1.8
Liberal Democrats	Ken Rolph	178	5.1	−0.1
Majority		105	2.8	
Turnout		3,480	26.0	
UKIP gain from Conservative		Swing	+6.0	

Carlford By-Election 7 July 2016
Party	Candidate	Votes	%	±%
Conservative	Robin Vickery	1,142	60.2	+1.4
Labour	Revd Canon Graham Hedger	344	18.2	+4.1
Liberal Democrats	Jon Neal	228	12.1	+4.2
Green	Jacqueline Barrow	176	9.3	+9.3
Majority		798	42.0	+2.0
Turnout		1,890	27.4	−10.6
Conservative hold		Swing	−1.4	

Hadleigh By-Election 22 September 2016
Party	Candidate	Votes	%	±%
Liberal Democrats	Trevor Sheldrick	642	36.2	+12.0
Conservative	Kathryn Grandon-White	460	25.9	−5.6
Labour	Susan Monks	397	22.4	+5.8
UKIP	Stephen Laing	204	11.5	−11.3
Green	Lisa Gordon	70	3.9	−0.9
Majority		182	10.3	
Turnout		1,777	26.9	
Liberal Democrats gain from Conservative		Swing	+8.8	

=== 2017-2021 ===
St John's By-Election 7 September 2017
Party	Candidate	Votes	%	±%
Labour	Sarah Adams	1,247	62.9	+5.3
Conservative	James Harding	483	24.4	−7.3
Liberal Democrats	Edward Packard	200	10.1	+5.1
Green	Charlotte Armstrong	52	2.6	−3.1
Majority		764	38.5	+12.6
Turnout		1,987	29.7	−6.2
Labour hold		Swing	+6.3	

Bosmere By-Election 25 October 2018
Party	Candidate	Votes	%	±%
Conservative	Kay Oakes	747	45.5	−0.5
Liberal Democrats	Stephen Phillips	726	44.2	+5.5
Labour	Emma Bonner-Morgan	168	10.2	+2.9
Majority		21	1.3	−6.0
Turnout		1,647	21.3	−11.4
Conservative hold		Swing	−2.6	

Newmarket & Redlodge By-Election 30 January 2020
Party	Candidate	Votes	%	±%
Conservative	Andrew Drummond	893	50.3	−0.2
Liberal Democrats	Jonathan Edge	315	17.7	+8.8
West Suffolk Independent	Andrew Appleby	248	14.0	+2.5
Labour	Theresa Chipulina	198	11.1	−4.5
Green	Alice Haycock	123	6.9	+6.9
Majority		578	32.6	−3.3
Turnout		1,783	17.2	−8.4
Conservative hold		Swing	−4.5	

=== 2021-2026 ===
Beccles: By-Election 17 November 2022
Party	Candidate	Votes	%	±%
Green	Ash Lever	2,114	70.5	+18.5
Conservative	Letitia Smith	624	20.8	–19.7
Labour	Christian Newsome	260	8.7	+1.2
Majority		1,490	49.7	N/A
Turnout		3,006	25.7	–15.9
Registered electors		11,703		
Green hold		Swing	▲19.1	

Felixstowe Coastal: 4 May 2023
Party	Candidate	Votes	%	±%
Liberal Democrats	Seamus Bennett	2,519	44.4	+25.8
Conservative	Kevin Sullivan	2,060	36.3	–13.2
Green	Lesley Bennett	939	16.6	+5.5
Communist	Mark Jones	150	2.6	±0.0
Majority		459	8.1	N/A
Turnout		5,740	36.5	−2.8
Registered electors		15,706		
Liberal Democrats gain from Conservative		Swing	+19.5	

Priory Heath: 4 May 2023
Party	Candidate	Votes	%	±%
Labour	Lucy Smith	918	50.8	+5.1
Conservative	Gregor McNie	567	31.4	–9.1
Green	Andy Patmore	180	10.0	+1.0
Liberal Democrats	Trevor Powell	143	7.9	+3.0
Majority		351	19.4	+14.2
Turnout		1,820	27.3	
Registered electors		6,679		
Labour hold		Swing	+7.1	

Woodbridge: 12 October 2023
Party	Candidate	Votes	%	±%
Liberal Democrats	Ruth Leach	990	51.2	–12.3
Conservative	Alan Porter	642	33.2	–3.3
Labour	Paul Richards	301	15.6	N/A
Majority		348	18.0	–9.0
Turnout		1,943	30.5	–16.4
Registered electors		6,363		
Liberal Democrats hold		Swing	-4.5	

Pakefield: 4 July 2024
Party	Candidate	Votes	%	±%
Labour	Peter Byatt	2,680	40.0	+13.9
Conservative	Mark Bee	2,295	33.4	–22.7
Liberal Democrats	Adam Robertson	960	14.3	+7.6
Independent	Paul Light	767	11.4	N/A
Majority		385	5.7	N/A
Turnout		6,864	57.8	+27.1
Registered electors		11,881		–77
Labour gain from Conservative		Swing	+18.3	

Hoxne and Eye: 10 October 2024
Party	Candidate	Votes	%	±%
Conservative	Henry Lloyd	895	45.3	+0.3
Green	Joanne Brooks	891	45.1	N/A
Liberal Democrats	Timothy Glenton	102	5.2	−14.0
Labour	Paul Theaker	89	4.5	−6.6
Majority		4	0.2	
Turnout		1,977	24.6	
Registered electors		7,992		
Conservative hold		Swing		

St John's: 24 April 2025
Party	Candidate	Votes	%	±%
Labour	Adele Cook	600	28.0	−19.7
Green	Adria Pittock	458	21.4	+13.6
Reform	Michelle Bevan-Margetts	442	20.6	+20.6
Liberal Democrats	Kelly Turner	323	15.1	+9.8
Conservative	James Harding	318	14.9	−24.3
Majority		142	6.6	
Turnout		2,141		
Labour hold		Swing		

Tower: 3 July 2025
Party	Candidate	Votes	%	±%
Reform	Martin Robinson	1,332	28.8	+28.8
Green	Clare Higson	1,155	25.0	−4.5
Conservative	Jo Rayner	808	17.5	−16.2
Labour	Judith Moore	667	14.4	−6.4
Independent	Frank Stennett	407	8.8	−1.4
Liberal Democrats	James Porter	259	5.6	+1.6
Majority		177	3.8	
Turnout		4,628		
Reform gain from Conservative		Swing		

Pakefield: 18 December 2025
Party	Candidate	Votes	%	±%
Reform	June Mummery	1,286	49.2	+49.2
Green	Dom Taylor	508	19.4	+9.1
Conservative	Letitia Smith	357	13.6	−43.3
Labour	Sonia Barker	328	12.5	−13.6
Liberal Democrats	Chris Thomas	137	5.2	−1.5
Majority		778	29.7	
Turnout		2,616		
Reform gain from Conservative		Swing		

=== 2026-2030 ===
Bosmere: By-Election 12 November 2026
Party	Candidate	Votes	%	±%
Conservative	Kay Oakes	762	33.2	+13.8
Green	Adria Pittock	739	32.2	+2.8
Reform	Patrick Wegener	400	17.4	−16.1
Restore	Nigel Mills	182	7.9	+7.9
Liberal Democrats	Attila Borzak	109	4.7	−8.4
Labour	Saffeen Yamulki	106	4.6	−0.1
Majority		23	1.0	
Turnout		2,298	25.7	–15.9
Conservative gain from Reform		Swing		
