= 1989 Suffolk County Council election =

1989 UK local government election

| ← 1985 | 4 May 1989 | 1993 → |

All 80 seats to Suffolk County Council 41 seats needed for a majority
- Registered: 477,406 (▲5.0%)
- Turnout: 37.5% (▼1.1%)

| | First party | Second party | Third party |
|---|---|---|---|
| Party | Conservative | Labour | SLD |
| Last election | 50 seats, 42.9% | 23 seats, 34.0% | 3 seats, 18.2% |
| Seats before | 49 | 23 | 3 |
| Seats won | 46 | 26 | 5 |
| Seat change | ▼4 | ▲3 | ▲2 |
| Popular vote | 78,236 | 62,494 | 27,443 |
| Percentage | 43.8% | 34.9% | 15.3% |
| Swing | ▲0.9% | ▲0.9% | ▼2.9% |
| | Fourth party |
| Party | Independent |
| Last election | 4 seats, 3.3% |
| Seats before | 5 |
| Seats won | 3 |
| Seat change | ▼1 |
| Popular vote | 6,203 |
| Percentage | 3.5% |
| Swing | ▲0.2% |
- Results of the 1989 Suffolk County Council election.
Council control before election
Conservative
Council control after election
Conservative

The 1989 Suffolk County Council election took place on 4 May 1989 to elect members of Suffolk County Council in Suffolk, England. It was held on the same day as other local elections.

== Summary ==
=== Election result ===
1989 Suffolk County Council election
| Party | Candidates | Seats | Gains | Losses | Net gain/loss | Seats % | Votes % | Votes | +/− |
|---|---|---|---|---|---|---|---|---|---|
| Conservative | 78 | 46 | 2 | 6 | ▼4 | 57.5 | 43.8 | 78,236 | +0.9 |
| Labour | 76 | 26 | 3 | 0 | ▲3 | 32.5 | 34.9 | 62,494 | +0.9 |
| SLD | 53 | 5 | 4 | 2 | ▲2 | 5.0 | 15.3 | 27,443 | –2.9 |
| Independent | 8 | 3 | 1 | 2 | ▼1 | 5.0 | 3.5 | 6,203 | +0.2 |
| Green | 15 | 0 | 0 | 0 | Steady | 0.0 | 2.5 | 4,445 | +1.2 |

== Division results by local authority ==
=== Babergh ===
Babergh District Summary
| Party | Seats | +/- | Votes | % | +/- |
|---|---|---|---|---|---|
| Conservative | 7 | ▲1 | 10,635 | 42.8 | –1.5 |
| Labour | 2 | Steady | 6,964 | 28.0 | –2.2 |
| SLD | 1 | Steady | 5,670 | 22.8 | +2.4 |
| Independent | 0 | ▼1 | 1,219 | 4.9 | +1.0 |
| Green | 0 | Steady | 341 | 1.4 | +0.2 |
| Total | 10 | Steady | 24,829 | 39.7 | –2.8 |

Division results

Belstead Brook
| Party | Candidate | Votes | % | ±% |
|---|---|---|---|---|
| Conservative | K. Linge | 1,355 | 48.1 | +5.4 |
| SLD | D. Goldfinch | 875 | 31.0 | –4.0 |
| Labour | D. Sandiford | 589 | 20.9 | –1.4 |
| Majority | | 480 | 17.0 | +9.3 |
| Turnout | | 2,819 | 38.2 | –4.6 |
| Registered electors | | 7,373 | | |
| Conservative hold | | Swing | ▲4.7 | |

Brett
| Party | Candidate | Votes | % | ±% |
|---|---|---|---|---|
| Conservative | Geoffrey Chantler | 849 | 37.6 | –14.6 |
| SLD | Mary Marshall | 560 | 24.8 | –7.9 |
| Independent | Angus Robertson | 513 | 22.7 | N/A |
| Labour | J. Anslow | 334 | 14.8 | –0.3 |
| Majority | | 289 | 12.8 | –6.7 |
| Turnout | | 2,256 | 46.8 | +3.2 |
| Registered electors | | 4,817 | | |
| Conservative hold | | Swing | ▼3.4 | |

Cosford
| Party | Candidate | Votes | % | ±% |
|---|---|---|---|---|
| Conservative | Diana Pembroke | 969 | 53.1 | –21.7 |
| SLD | Doreen French | 570 | 31.2 | N/A |
| Labour | Margaret Nelson | 287 | 15.7 | –9.5 |
| Majority | | 399 | 21.9 | –18.2 |
| Turnout | | 1,826 | 41.4 | +1.3 |
| Registered electors | | 4,407 | | |
| Conservative hold | | Swing | | |

Great Cornard
| Party | Candidate | Votes | % | ±% |
|---|---|---|---|---|
| Labour | Mick Cornish* | 1,130 | 54.0 | +7.9 |
| Conservative | Charles Hudleston | 765 | 36.6 | +5.7 |
| SLD | Geoffrey Raggett | 196 | 9.4 | –13.5 |
| Majority | | 365 | 17.5 | +2.3 |
| Turnout | | 2,091 | 35.0 | –11.8 |
| Registered electors | | 5,971 | | |
| Labour hold | | Swing | ▲1.1 | |

Hadleigh
| Party | Candidate | Votes | % | ±% |
|---|---|---|---|---|
| SLD | David Grutchfield | 1,006 | 49.9 | N/A |
| Independent | John Bloomfield * | 706 | 35.0 | –25.4 |
| Labour | Ashley Seaborne | 306 | 15.2 | –24.4 |
| Majority | | 300 | 14.9 | N/A |
| Turnout | | 2,018 | 39.0 | +4.7 |
| Registered electors | | 5,173 | | |
| SLD gain from Independent | | Swing | | |

Melford
| Party | Candidate | Votes | % | ±% |
|---|---|---|---|---|
| Conservative | Freddie Gales * | 1,243 | 48.0 | +0.3 |
| Labour | Sheila Guyton | 654 | 25.3 | –1.4 |
| SLD | John Gleed | 352 | 13.6 | –12.1 |
| Green | Michael Green | 341 | 13.2 | N/A |
| Majority | | 589 | 22.7 | +1.7 |
| Turnout | | 2,590 | 36.6 | –4.9 |
| Registered electors | | 7,090 | | |
| Conservative hold | | Swing | ▲0.9 | |

Peninsula
| Party | Candidate | Votes | % | ±% |
|---|---|---|---|---|
| Conservative | J. Delves | 1,101 | 48.9 | +9.1 |
| SLD | R. Fishwick | 737 | 32.7 | –11.1 |
| Labour | Anthony Bavington | 415 | 18.4 | +2.1 |
| Majority | | 364 | 16.2 | N/A |
| Turnout | | 2,253 | 40.4 | –9.2 |
| Registered electors | | 5,572 | | |
| Conservative gain from SLD | | Swing | ▲10.1 | |

Samford
| Party | Candidate | Votes | % | ±% |
|---|---|---|---|---|
| Conservative | William Curnow * | 1,229 | 44.8 | +4.5 |
| SLD | Joan Miller | 994 | 36.2 | +4.8 |
| Labour | David Evans | 523 | 19.0 | –9.3 |
| Majority | | 235 | 8.6 | –0.3 |
| Turnout | | 2,746 | 46.4 | –5.5 |
| Registered electors | | 5,912 | | |
| Conservative hold | | Swing | ▼0.2 | |

Stour Valley
| Party | Candidate | Votes | % | ±% |
|---|---|---|---|---|
| Conservative | Selwyn Pryor * | 1,554 | 57.6 | –4.4 |
| Labour | John Skinner | 764 | 28.3 | +2.0 |
| SLD | R. Milne | 380 | 14.1 | N/A |
| Majority | | 790 | 29.3 | –6.4 |
| Turnout | | 2,698 | 38.4 | –0.4 |
| Registered electors | | 7,032 | | |
| Conservative hold | | Swing | ▼3.2 | |

Sudbury
| Party | Candidate | Votes | % | ±% |
|---|---|---|---|---|
| Labour | Elizabeth Wiles * | 1,962 | 55.5 | +3.2 |
| Conservative | Graeme Garden | 1,570 | 44.5 | –3.2 |
| Majority | | 392 | 11.1 | +6.6 |
| Turnout | | 3,532 | 38.6 | +1.6 |
| Registered electors | | 9,144 | | |
| Labour hold | | Swing | ▲3.3 | |

=== Forest Heath ===
Forest Heath District Summary
| Party | Seats | +/- | Votes | % | +/- |
|---|---|---|---|---|---|
| Conservative | 5 | Steady | 4,993 | 52.6 | +2.5 |
| Independent | 1 | Steady | 1,513 | 15.9 | +5.5 |
| Labour | 0 | Steady | 2,984 | 31.4 | +0.1 |
| Total | 6 | Steady | 9,490 | 28.5 | –6.5 |

Division results

Brandon
| Party | Candidate | Votes | % | ±% |
|---|---|---|---|---|
| Conservative | Harvey Adam * | 955 | 62.7 | +5.3 |
| Labour | Nolan Guthrie | 568 | 37.3 | –5.3 |
| Majority | | 387 | 25.4 | +10.6 |
| Turnout | | 1,523 | 27.4 | –3.0 |
| Registered electors | | 5,561 | | |
| Conservative hold | | Swing | ▲5.3 | |

Exning
| Party | Candidate | Votes | % | ±% |
|---|---|---|---|---|
| Conservative | Maurice Hopkinson * | 956 | 64.3 | +19.2 |
| Labour | Jane Sehgal | 530 | 35.7 | +10.2 |
| Majority | | 426 | 28.7 | +13.0 |
| Turnout | | 1,486 | 22.8 | –7.8 |
| Registered electors | | 6,520 | | |
| Conservative hold | | Swing | ▲4.5 | |

Icknield
| Party | Candidate | Votes | % | ±% |
|---|---|---|---|---|
| Conservative | Fred Thomason | 1,160 | 72.5 | +2.5 |
| Labour | Keith Holland | 439 | 27.5 | –2.5 |
| Majority | | 721 | 45.1 | +5.0 |
| Turnout | | 1,599 | 30.1 | –3.7 |
| Registered electors | | 5,318 | | |
| Conservative hold | | Swing | ▲2.5 | |

Mildenhall
| Party | Candidate | Votes | % | ±% |
|---|---|---|---|---|
| Conservative | Roger Pendleton | 750 | 42.2 | –14.6 |
| Labour | Peter Dawson | 596 | 33.5 | –9.7 |
| Independent | John Barker | 433 | 24.3 | N/A |
| Majority | | 154 | 8.7 | –5.0 |
| Turnout | | 1,779 | 34.7 | +0.9 |
| Registered electors | | 5,129 | | |
| Conservative hold | | Swing | ▼2.5 | |

Newmarket Town
| Party | Candidate | Votes | % | ±% |
|---|---|---|---|---|
| Conservative | Arthur Crickmere * | 1,172 | 65.4 | +17.0 |
| Labour | Colin Muge | 619 | 34.6 | –1.7 |
| Majority | | 553 | 30.9 | +18.8 |
| Turnout | | 1,791 | 31.7 | –9.7 |
| Registered electors | | 5,647 | | |
| Conservative hold | | Swing | ▲9.4 | |

Row Heath
| Party | Candidate | Votes | % | ±% |
|---|---|---|---|---|
| Independent | Jack Haylock* | 1,080 | 82.3 | +23.9 |
| Labour | John Neville | 232 | 17.7 | +3.6 |
| Majority | | 848 | 64.6 | +33.7 |
| Turnout | | 1,312 | 26.0 | –14.4 |
| Registered electors | | 5,050 | | |
| Independent hold | | Swing | ▲16.9 | |

=== Ipswich ===
Ipswich District Summary
| Party | Seats | +/- | Votes | % | +/- |
|---|---|---|---|---|---|
| Labour | 12 | Steady | 18,513 | 55.9 | +3.8 |
| Conservative | 4 | Steady | 11,976 | 36.1 | +1.0 |
| SLD | 0 | Steady | 1,470 | 4.4 | –8.4 |
| Green | 0 | Steady | 1,171 | 3.5 | N/A |
| Total | 16 | Steady | 33,130 | 36.8 | +0.8 |

Division results

Bixley
| Party | Candidate | Votes | % | ±% |
|---|---|---|---|---|
| Conservative | Nina Alcock * | 1,300 | 55.7 | –1.0 |
| SLD | D. Jackson | 474 | 20.3 | –2.8 |
| Labour | Brian Coleman | 410 | 17.6 | –2.5 |
| Green | P. Pitty | 151 | 6.5 | N/A |
| Majority | | 826 | 35.4 | +1.8 |
| Turnout | | 2,335 | 39.8 | –2.0 |
| Registered electors | | 5,865 | | |
| Conservative hold | | Swing | ▲0.9 | |

Bridge
| Party | Candidate | Votes | % | ±% |
|---|---|---|---|---|
| Labour | Ken Doran | 1,157 | 65.7 | –5.4 |
| Conservative | L. Green | 399 | 22.7 | –6.2 |
| Green | J. Scott | 205 | 11.6 | N/A |
| Majority | | 758 | 43.0 | +0.7 |
| Turnout | | 1,761 | 31.5 | –0.4 |
| Registered electors | | 5,589 | | |
| Labour hold | | Swing | ▲0.4 | |

Broom Hill
| Party | Candidate | Votes | % | ±% |
|---|---|---|---|---|
| Conservative | Brian Pinner * | 864 | 44.8 | –16.2 |
| Labour | S. Mason | 689 | 35.7 | –2.3 |
| Green | S. Tooke | 192 | 10.0 | N/A |
| SLD | J. Odell | 183 | 9.5 | N/A |
| Majority | | 175 | 9.1 | –12.9 |
| Turnout | | 1,928 | 38.0 | +3.2 |
| Registered electors | | 5,074 | | |
| Conservative hold | | Swing | ▼7.0 | |

Castle Hill
| Party | Candidate | Votes | % | ±% |
|---|---|---|---|---|
| Conservative | Eddie Alcock * | 1,107 | 49.0 | +1.4 |
| Labour | D. Long | 831 | 36.8 | +4.0 |
| Green | P. Jackson | 206 | 9.1 | N/A |
| SLD | G. Reynolds | 117 | 5.2 | –14.4 |
| Majority | | 276 | 12.2 | –2.6 |
| Turnout | | 2,261 | 38.3 | +3.2 |
| Registered electors | | 5,908 | | |
| Conservative hold | | Swing | ▼1.3 | |

Chantry
| Party | Candidate | Votes | % | ±% |
|---|---|---|---|---|
| Labour | Susan Thomas | 1,177 | 77.5 | +2.3 |
| Conservative | N. Harrison | 341 | 22.5 | +7.4 |
| Majority | | 836 | 55.1 | –5.0 |
| Turnout | | 1,518 | 32.3 | +5.5 |
| Registered electors | | 4,703 | | |
| Labour hold | | Swing | ▼2.5 | |

Gainsborough
| Party | Candidate | Votes | % | ±% |
|---|---|---|---|---|
| Labour | R. Crane | 1,638 | 80.7 | –3.8 |
| Conservative | G. Morris | 392 | 19.3 | +3.8 |
| Majority | | 1,246 | 61.4 | –7.6 |
| Turnout | | 2,030 | 33.5 | +1.4 |
| Registered electors | | 6,064 | | |
| Labour hold | | Swing | ▼3.8 | |

Ipswich St Margarets
| Party | Candidate | Votes | % | ±% |
|---|---|---|---|---|
| Conservative | Jill Swindin* | 1,199 | 54.0 | +3.9 |
| Labour | S. Reynolds | 844 | 38.0 | +11.1 |
| SLD | M. Pakes | 178 | 8.0 | –15.0 |
| Majority | | 355 | 16.0 | –7.3 |
| Turnout | | 2,221 | 38.9 | –0.9 |
| Registered electors | | 5,717 | | |
| Conservative hold | | Swing | ▼6.7 | |

Ipswich Town
| Party | Candidate | Votes | % | ±% |
|---|---|---|---|---|
| Labour | Chris Mole* | 1,212 | 63.8 | –2.5 |
| Conservative | B. Castle | 468 | 24.6 | +1.5 |
| Green | D. Kindred | 221 | 11.6 | N/A |
| Majority | | 744 | 39.1 | –4.0 |
| Turnout | | 1,901 | 34.9 | –0.1 |
| Registered electors | | 5,440 | | |
| Labour hold | | Swing | ▼2.0 | |

Priory Heath
| Party | Candidate | Votes | % | ±% |
|---|---|---|---|---|
| Labour | Ronald Sudds | 1,569 | 77.4 | +13.7 |
| Conservative | D. Jackson | 457 | 22.6 | –4.3 |
| Majority | | 1,112 | 54.9 | +18.1 |
| Turnout | | 2,026 | 36.6 | +1.7 |
| Registered electors | | 5,542 | | |
| Labour hold | | Swing | ▲9.0 | |

Rushmere
| Party | Candidate | Votes | % | ±% |
|---|---|---|---|---|
| Labour | G. Auton | 1,458 | 51.5 | +3.9 |
| Conservative | A. Barker | 1,200 | 42.4 | +5.2 |
| SLD | J. Devlin | 171 | 6.0 | –9.2 |
| Majority | | 258 | 9.1 | –1.3 |
| Turnout | | 2,829 | 47.8 | –0.4 |
| Registered electors | | 5,918 | | |
| Labour hold | | Swing | ▼0.7 | |

Sprites
| Party | Candidate | Votes | % | ±% |
|---|---|---|---|---|
| Labour | Robin Sargent* | 1,355 | 69.0 | +7.4 |
| Conservative | P. Hammond | 468 | 23.8 | +0.3 |
| Green | K. Smith | 142 | 7.2 | N/A |
| Majority | | 887 | 45.1 | +7.0 |
| Turnout | | 1,965 | 33.9 | +3.9 |
| Registered electors | | 5,799 | | |
| Labour hold | | Swing | ▲3.5 | |

St Clements
| Party | Candidate | Votes | % | ±% |
|---|---|---|---|---|
| Labour | B. Chaplin | 1,432 | 51.9 | +3.6 |
| Conservative | R. Baldry | 1,326 | 48.1 | +8.0 |
| Majority | | 106 | 3.8 | –4.4 |
| Turnout | | 2,758 | 48.7 | +0.2 |
| Registered electors | | 5,663 | | |
| Labour hold | | Swing | ▼2.2 | |

St John's
| Party | Candidate | Votes | % | ±% |
|---|---|---|---|---|
| Labour | Michael Hyde | 1,390 | 61.7 | +13.9 |
| Conservative | A. Kingham | 862 | 38.3 | +1.7 |
| Majority | | 528 | 23.4 | +7.8 |
| Turnout | | 2,252 | 37.5 | –4.5 |
| Registered electors | | 6,013 | | |
| Labour hold | | Swing | ▲6.1 | |

Stoke Park
| Party | Candidate | Votes | % | ±% |
|---|---|---|---|---|
| Labour | M. Campbell | 1,030 | 54.4 | +0.2 |
| Conservative | J. Goodwin | 725 | 38.3 | +8.3 |
| SLD | J. Logan-Smith | 137 | 7.2 | –8.6 |
| Majority | | 305 | 16.1 | –8.1 |
| Turnout | | 1,892 | 32.3 | +2.7 |
| Registered electors | | 5,863 | | |
| Labour hold | | Swing | ▼4.1 | |

Whitehouse
| Party | Candidate | Votes | % | ±% |
|---|---|---|---|---|
| Labour | J. Watkins* | 1,027 | 66.6 | +2.2 |
| Conservative | S. Laine | 381 | 24.7 | +3.9 |
| SLD | E. Beattie | 79 | 5.1 | –9.7 |
| Green | C. Stollery | 54 | 3.5 | N/A |
| Majority | | 646 | 41.9 | –1.6 |
| Turnout | | 1,541 | 27.7 | –2.0 |
| Registered electors | | 5,570 | | |
| Labour hold | | Swing | ▼0.9 | |

Whitton
| Party | Candidate | Votes | % | ±% |
|---|---|---|---|---|
| Labour | C. Packard | 1,294 | 67.7 | +0.9 |
| Conservative | R. Grimsey | 487 | 25.5 | +3.7 |
| SLD | N. Cheeseman | 131 | 6.9 | –4.6 |
| Majority | | 807 | 42.2 | –2.8 |
| Turnout | | 1,912 | 35.9 | +4.1 |
| Registered electors | | 5,332 | | |
| Labour hold | | Swing | ▼1.4 | |

=== Mid Suffolk ===
Mid Suffolk District Summary
| Party | Seats | +/- | Votes | % | +/- |
|---|---|---|---|---|---|
| Conservative | 7 | ▼1 | 10,341 | 44.7 | –2.3 |
| Labour | 2 | ▲1 | 6,386 | 27.6 | +1.9 |
| SLD | 1 | ▲1 | 5,167 | 22.3 | +4.6 |
| Green | 0 | Steady | 793 | 3.4 | –0.4 |
| Independent | 0 | ▼1 | 441 | 1.9 | –4.0 |
| Total | 10 | Steady | 23,128 | 38.5 | +0.9 |

Bosmere
| Party | Candidate | Votes | % | ±% |
|---|---|---|---|---|
| Conservative | John Patton * | 1,241 | 53.7 | +3.1 |
| SLD | J. Fisher | 537 | 23.2 | –7.9 |
| Labour | D. Hill | 535 | 23.1 | +4.8 |
| Majority | | 704 | 30.4 | +10.9 |
| Turnout | | 2,313 | 36.4 | –1.4 |
| Registered electors | | 6,359 | | |
| Conservative hold | | Swing | ▼5.4 | |

Gipping Valley
| Party | Candidate | Votes | % | ±% |
|---|---|---|---|---|
| Conservative | Gavin Caldwell-Smith* | 1,068 | 48.0 | –4.7 |
| Labour | Terry Wilson | 832 | 37.4 | –9.9 |
| SLD | Nigel Ramsden | 325 | 14.6 | N/A |
| Majority | | 236 | 10.6 | +5.3 |
| Turnout | | 2,225 | 38.5 | +3.0 |
| Registered electors | | 5,783 | | |
| Conservative hold | | Swing | ▲2.6 | |

Hartismere
| Party | Candidate | Votes | % | ±% |
|---|---|---|---|---|
| SLD | Lesley Henniker-Major | 1,172 | 40.4 | N/A |
| Conservative | R. Passmore | 1,027 | 35.4 | +4.7 |
| Labour | Terence O'Keefe | 705 | 24.3 | +5.9 |
| Majority | | 145 | 5.0 | N/A |
| Turnout | | 2,904 | 46.4 | +3.9 |
| Registered electors | | 6,253 | | |
| SLD gain from Independent | | | | |

Hoxne
| Party | Candidate | Votes | % | ±% |
|---|---|---|---|---|
| Conservative | Guy McGregor * | 1,310 | 55.9 | +2.1 |
| SLD | A. Pietrzak | 554 | 23.6 | –4.6 |
| Labour | M. Weatherall | 480 | 20.5 | +2.5 |
| Majority | | 756 | 32.3 | +6.7 |
| Turnout | | 2,344 | 36.5 | –3.8 |
| Registered electors | | 6,415 | | |
| Conservative hold | | Swing | ▲3.4 | |

Stowmarket St Marys
| Party | Candidate | Votes | % | ±% |
|---|---|---|---|---|
| Labour | Ernie Nunn * | 961 | 49.9 | +12.0 |
| Conservative | G. Paton | 603 | 31.3 | –4.2 |
| SLD | J. Shaw | 288 | 15.0 | –11.6 |
| Green | W. Doward | 74 | 3.8 | N/A |
| Majority | | 358 | 18.6 | +16.2 |
| Turnout | | 1,926 | 37.7 | –2.8 |
| Registered electors | | 5,102 | | |
| Labour hold | | Swing | ▲8.1 | |

Stowmarket St Peters
| Party | Candidate | Votes | % | ±% |
|---|---|---|---|---|
| Labour | Duncan Macpherson | 1,091 | 59.7 | +24.8 |
| Conservative | D. Perry | 521 | 28.5 | –8.5 |
| SLD | H. Gray | 214 | 11.7 | –13.7 |
| Majority | | 570 | 31.2 | N/A |
| Turnout | | 1,826 | 36.1 | +3.8 |
| Registered electors | | 5,057 | | |
| Labour gain from Conservative | | Swing | ▲16.7 | |

Thedwastre North
| Party | Candidate | Votes | % | ±% |
|---|---|---|---|---|
| Conservative | Sue Sida * | 1,195 | 51.5 | +4.3 |
| Green | John Matthissen | 434 | 18.7 | +11.6 |
| Labour | Ronald Snell | 351 | 15.1 | +1.3 |
| SLD | F. Moore | 342 | 14.7 | –17.1 |
| Majority | | 761 | 32.8 | +17.4 |
| Turnout | | 2,322 | 37.1 | –3.9 |
| Registered electors | | 6,358 | | |
| Conservative hold | | Swing | ▼3.7 | |

Thedwastre South
| Party | Candidate | Votes | % | ±% |
|---|---|---|---|---|
| Conservative | Ronald Aitken | 1,046 | 42.2 | –2.1 |
| SLD | Penny Otton | 826 | 33.3 | –0.2 |
| Labour | P. Stanners | 324 | 13.1 | –3.2 |
| Green | D. Chapman | 285 | 11.5 | +5.6 |
| Majority | | 220 | 8.9 | –1.9 |
| Turnout | | 2,481 | 39.0 | +4.3 |
| Registered electors | | 6,358 | | |
| Conservative hold | | Swing | ▼1.0 | |

Thredling
| Party | Candidate | Votes | % | ±% |
|---|---|---|---|---|
| Conservative | Jeremy Clover* | 1,355 | 57.0 | –14.2 |
| SLD | Bernard Ward | 560 | 23.5 | N/A |
| Labour | D. Fearnhead | 464 | 19.5 | –9.3 |
| Majority | | 795 | 33.4 | –9.0 |
| Turnout | | 2,379 | 37.4 | +5.6 |
| Registered electors | | 6,368 | | |
| Conservative hold | | Swing | | |

Upper Gipping
| Party | Candidate | Votes | % | ±% |
|---|---|---|---|---|
| Conservative | Don Farthing* | 975 | 40.5 | –5.5 |
| Labour | Anthony Lewis | 643 | 26.7 | –6.5 |
| Independent | Roger Stearn | 441 | 18.3 | N/A |
| SLD | A. Lilley | 349 | 14.5 | N/A |
| Majority | | 332 | 13.8 | +1.0 |
| Turnout | | 2,408 | 39.0 | –0.3 |
| Registered electors | | 6,167 | | |
| Conservative hold | | Swing | ▲0.5 | |

=== Suffolk Coastal ===
Suffolk Coastal District Summary
| Party | Seats | +/- | Votes | % | +/- |
|---|---|---|---|---|---|
| Conservative | 12 | ▼1 | 16,602 | 51.4 | +3.3 |
| Labour | 1 | ▲1 | 8,500 | 26.3 | +6.2 |
| SLD | 0 | Steady | 4,911 | 15.2 | –12.2 |
| Green | 0 | Steady | 2,282 | 7.1 | N/A |
| Total | 13 | Steady | 32,295 | 40.9 | –3.2 |

Blything
| Party | Candidate | Votes | % | ±% |
|---|---|---|---|---|
| Conservative | H. Hall* | 1,300 | 51.9 | +1.0 |
| Green | J. Barnett | 617 | 24.6 | N/A |
| Labour | C. Northover | 590 | 23.5 | +9.4 |
| Majority | | 683 | 27.2 | –5.3 |
| Turnout | | 2,507 | 48.9 | –0.4 |
| Registered electors | | 5,132 | | |
| Conservative hold | | Swing | | |

Carlford
| Party | Candidate | Votes | % | ±% |
|---|---|---|---|---|
| Conservative | H. Bestow* | 1,579 | 71.8 | +20.7 |
| Labour | M. Eyton | 619 | 28.2 | +15.1 |
| Majority | | 960 | 43.7 | +28.3 |
| Turnout | | 2,198 | 34.7 | –5.6 |
| Registered electors | | 6,333 | | |
| Conservative hold | | Swing | ▲2.8 | |

Clay Hills
| Party | Candidate | Votes | % | ±% |
|---|---|---|---|---|
| Conservative | P. Batho | 1,066 | 40.6 | –4.3 |
| Labour | Terry Hodgson | 970 | 37.0 | +6.6 |
| Green | J. Holloway | 354 | 13.5 | N/A |
| SLD | W. Moss | 234 | 8.9 | –2.4 |
| Majority | | 96 | 3.7 | –10.8 |
| Turnout | | 2,624 | 40.7 | –6.0 |
| Registered electors | | 6,450 | | |
| Conservative hold | | Swing | ▼5.5 | |

Colneis
| Party | Candidate | Votes | % | ±% |
|---|---|---|---|---|
| Conservative | A. Rodwell* | 1,475 | 48.2 | –5.2 |
| Labour | C. Thompson | 558 | 18.2 | –2.0 |
| SLD | N. Cawthorn | 545 | 17.8 | –8.6 |
| Green | A. Hart | 483 | 15.8 | N/A |
| Majority | | 917 | 30.0 | +3.0 |
| Turnout | | 3,061 | 40.8 | –1.8 |
| Registered electors | | 7,511 | | |
| Conservative hold | | Swing | ▼1.6 | |

Felixstowe Ferry
| Party | Candidate | Votes | % | ±% |
|---|---|---|---|---|
| Conservative | M. Goodman* | 1,703 | 60.8 | +3.7 |
| Labour | R. Whitworth | 561 | 20.0 | N/A |
| SLD | M. Sheppard | 537 | 19.2 | –23.7 |
| Majority | | 1,142 | 40.8 | +26.5 |
| Turnout | | 2,801 | 47.5 | –2.7 |
| Registered electors | | 5,898 | | |
| Conservative hold | | Swing | | |

Felixstowe Landguard
| Party | Candidate | Votes | % | ±% |
|---|---|---|---|---|
| Conservative | R. Savage* | 988 | 41.8 | +0.8 |
| Labour | B. Lassey | 724 | 30.6 | +7.8 |
| SLD | C. Macgregor | 653 | 27.6 | +4.0 |
| Majority | | 264 | 11.2 | –6.2 |
| Turnout | | 2,365 | 36.7 | –0.3 |
| Registered electors | | 6,449 | | |
| Conservative hold | | Swing | ▼3.5 | |

Felixstowe Walton
| Party | Candidate | Votes | % | ±% |
|---|---|---|---|---|
| Labour | Don Smith | 1,054 | 42.0 | +7.9 |
| Conservative | M. Staggs | 1,052 | 41.9 | +2.1 |
| SLD | D. Rayner | 402 | 16.0 | –10.1 |
| Majority | | 2 | 0.1 | N/A |
| Turnout | | 2,508 | 45.3 | –0.3 |
| Registered electors | | 5,535 | | |
| Labour gain from Conservative | | Swing | ▲2.9 | |

Framlingham
| Party | Candidate | Votes | % | ±% |
|---|---|---|---|---|
| Conservative | D. Mangan | 1,118 | 46.9 | –3.2 |
| Labour | J. Campbell | 676 | 28.4 | +8.8 |
| Green | J. Ball | 417 | 17.5 | N/A |
| SLD | P. Booth | 172 | 7.2 | –23.1 |
| Majority | | 442 | 18.5 | –1.3 |
| Turnout | | 2,383 | 44.7 | –1.2 |
| Registered electors | | 5,335 | | |
| Conservative hold | | Swing | ▼6.0 | |

Kesgrave & Martlesham
| Party | Candidate | Votes | % | ±% |
|---|---|---|---|---|
| Conservative | Christopher Penn * | 1,719 | 64.4 | +17.4 |
| Labour | E. Crook | 949 | 35.9 | +8.7 |
| Majority | | 770 | 28.9 | +8.8 |
| Turnout | | 2,668 | 36.4 | –4.1 |
| Registered electors | | 7,332 | | |
| Conservative hold | | Swing | ▲4.4 | |

Plomesgate
| Party | Candidate | Votes | % | ±% |
|---|---|---|---|---|
| Conservative | F. Cowley* | 1,251 | 60.2 | +9.2 |
| SLD | J. Jacob | 462 | 22.2 | –6.9 |
| Labour | S. Manley | 365 | 17.6 | –2.3 |
| Majority | | 789 | 38.0 | +8.1 |
| Turnout | | 2,078 | 38.3 | –7.6 |
| Registered electors | | 5,429 | | |
| Conservative hold | | Swing | ▲8.1 | |

Wickham
| Party | Candidate | Votes | % | ±% |
|---|---|---|---|---|
| Conservative | P. Atkinson | 1,125 | 53.9 | +8.0 |
| Labour | Val Pizzey | 529 | 25.3 | +4.7 |
| SLD | C. Rooke | 433 | 20.7 | –12.8 |
| Majority | | 596 | 28.6 | +16.3 |
| Turnout | | 2,087 | 33.6 | –3.3 |
| Registered electors | | 6,214 | | |
| Conservative hold | | Swing | ▲1.7 | |

Wilford
| Party | Candidate | Votes | % | ±% |
|---|---|---|---|---|
| Conservative | R. Sheepshanks* | 1,098 | 47.3 | +2.4 |
| SLD | P. Monk | 855 | 36.8 | +18.8 |
| Labour | P. Buck | 369 | 15.9 | –5.9 |
| Majority | | 243 | 10.5 | –12.6 |
| Turnout | | 2,322 | 44.4 | –2.4 |
| Registered electors | | 5,232 | | |
| Conservative hold | | Swing | ▼8.2 | |

Woodbridge
| Party | Candidate | Votes | % | ±% |
|---|---|---|---|---|
| Conservative | B. Rosher* | 1,128 | 41.9 | –2.4 |
| SLD | D. Ball | 618 | 22.9 | –13.9 |
| Labour | Roy Burgon | 536 | 19.9 | +1.0 |
| Green | P. Lanyon | 411 | 15.3 | N/A |
| Majority | | 510 | 18.9 | +11.5 |
| Turnout | | 2,693 | 44.7 | +5.0 |
| Registered electors | | 6,021 | | |
| Conservative hold | | Swing | ▲5.8 | |

=== St Edmundsbury ===
St Edmundsbury District Summary
| Party | Seats | +/- | Votes | % | +/- |
|---|---|---|---|---|---|
| Conservative | 8 | ▲1 | 12,243 | 50.3 | +5.2 |
| Labour | 2 | Steady | 7,849 | 32.3 | +3.1 |
| SLD | 1 | ▼1 | 3,943 | 16.2 | –3.5 |
| Independent | 0 | Steady | 294 | 1.2 | –0.2 |
| Total | 11 | Steady | 24,329 | 35.5 | –2.8 |

Division results

Abbeygate & Eastgate
| Party | Candidate | Votes | % | ±% |
|---|---|---|---|---|
| Conservative | Laver Oliver * | 1,303 | 62.4 | +6.2 |
| Labour | M. Roberts | 784 | 37.6 | +10.6 |
| Majority | | 519 | 24.9 | –4.3 |
| Turnout | | 2,087 | 35.4 | –4.8 |
| Registered electors | | 5,893 | | |
| Conservative hold | | Swing | ▼2.2 | |

Blackbourn
| Party | Candidate | Votes | % | ±% |
|---|---|---|---|---|
| Conservative | Joanna Spicer | 1,333 | 46.2 | –2.3 |
| SLD | Thomas Cook | 639 | 22.1 | –6.3 |
| Labour | Michael Potter | 619 | 21.5 | –1.6 |
| Independent | George Reeve * | 294 | 10.2 | N/A |
| Majority | | 694 | 24.1 | +4.0 |
| Turnout | | 2,885 | 41.3 | +4.7 |
| Registered electors | | 6,979 | | |
| Conservative hold | | Swing | ▲2.0 | |

Clare
| Party | Candidate | Votes | % | ±% |
|---|---|---|---|---|
| Conservative | Philip Draycott | 1,250 | 56.0 | –10.2 |
| Labour | Patrick Conneely | 524 | 23.5 | –10.3 |
| SLD | Pam O'Garvaigh | 458 | 20.5 | N/A |
| Majority | | 726 | 32.5 | +0.2 |
| Turnout | | 2,232 | 37.9 | +4.9 |
| Registered electors | | 5,894 | | |
| Conservative hold | | Swing | ▲0.1 | |

Haverhill North
| Party | Candidate | Votes | % | ±% |
|---|---|---|---|---|
| Labour | Laurence Kiernan | 1,169 | 62.0 | –2.8 |
| Conservative | Max Elliott | 718 | 38.0 | +2.8 |
| Majority | | 451 | 23.9 | –5.8 |
| Turnout | | 1,887 | 31.9 | +1.6 |
| Registered electors | | 5,912 | | |
| Labour hold | | Swing | ▼2.9 | |

Haverhill South
| Party | Candidate | Votes | % | ±% |
|---|---|---|---|---|
| SLD | Colin Jones * | 1,059 | 52.5 | +7.1 |
| Labour | Maureen Byrne | 625 | 31.0 | –3.7 |
| Conservative | I. Edwards | 335 | 16.6 | –3.3 |
| Majority | | 434 | 21.5 | +10.8 |
| Turnout | | 2,019 | 26.5 | –8.1 |
| Registered electors | | 7,629 | | |
| SLD hold | | Swing | ▲5.4 | |

Northgate & St Olaves
| Party | Candidate | Votes | % | ±% |
|---|---|---|---|---|
| Labour | David Lockwood * | 1,533 | 79.4 | +13.2 |
| Conservative | Henry Saltmarsh | 397 | 20.6 | +5.4 |
| Majority | | 1,136 | 58.9 | +11.2 |
| Turnout | | 1,930 | 34.9 | +0.6 |
| Registered electors | | 5,535 | | |
| Labour hold | | Swing | ▲3.9 | |

Risbridge
| Party | Candidate | Votes | % | ±% |
|---|---|---|---|---|
| Conservative | Caroline Kirk * | 1,490 | 57.1 | –4.2 |
| SLD | Michael McCormack | 763 | 29.3 | N/A |
| Labour | Chris Child | 355 | 13.6 | –6.7 |
| Majority | | 727 | 27.9 | –13.0 |
| Turnout | | 2,608 | 43.4 | +2.5 |
| Registered electors | | 6,010 | | |
| Conservative hold | | Swing | | |

Risbygate & Sextons
| Party | Candidate | Votes | % | ±% |
|---|---|---|---|---|
| Conservative | Richard Ferrier* | 1,212 | 53.2 | +9.2 |
| Labour | Andrew Brewer | 1,067 | 46.8 | +16.3 |
| Majority | | 145 | 6.4 | –7.2 |
| Turnout | | 2,279 | 41.1 | –3.3 |
| Registered electors | | 5,542 | | |
| Conservative hold | | Swing | ▼3.6 | |

Southgate & Westgate
| Party | Candidate | Votes | % | ±% |
|---|---|---|---|---|
| Conservative | Alan Green | 1,501 | 59.4 | +19.0 |
| SLD | R. Hart | 1,024 | 40.6 | –2.5 |
| Majority | | 477 | 18.9 | N/A |
| Turnout | | 2,525 | 30.7 | –15.6 |
| Registered electors | | 8,236 | | |
| Conservative gain from SLD | | Swing | ▲10.8 | |

Thingoe North
| Party | Candidate | Votes | % | ±% |
|---|---|---|---|---|
| Conservative | Jose Pereira * | 1,720 | 71.0 | +18.9 |
| Labour | F. Roberts | 704 | 29.0 | +17.8 |
| Majority | | 1,016 | 41.9 | +20.7 |
| Turnout | | 2,424 | 36.8 | –5.4 |
| Registered electors | | 6,595 | | |
| Conservative hold | | Swing | ▲0.6 | |

Thingoe South
| Party | Candidate | Votes | % | ±% |
|---|---|---|---|---|
| Conservative | Elizabeth Milburn | 984 | 67.7 | +16.6 |
| Labour | Chris Keeble | 469 | 32.3 | +17.8 |
| Majority | | 515 | 35.4 | +13.8 |
| Turnout | | 1,453 | 34.0 | –4.6 |
| Registered electors | | 4,275 | | |
| Conservative hold | | Swing | ▼0.6 | |

=== Waveney ===
Waveney District Summary
| Party | Seats | +/- | Votes | % | +/- |
|---|---|---|---|---|---|
| Labour | 7 | ▲1 | 11,298 | 35.3 | –8.2 |
| Conservative | 3 | ▼4 | 11,446 | 35.8 | –1.5 |
| SLD | 2 | ▲2 | 6,282 | 19.7 | +4.5 |
| Independent | 2 | ▲1 | 2,736 | 8.6 | +6.0 |
| Ind. Conservative | 0 | Steady | 204 | 0.6 | N/A |
| Total | 14 | Steady | 31,966 | 38.0 | –0.2 |

Division results

Beccles
| Party | Candidate | Votes | % | ±% |
|---|---|---|---|---|
| Labour | Harold Ley | 818 | 38.4 | +15.7 |
| Conservative | L. Street | 776 | 36.4 | –3.2 |
| SLD | E. Crisp | 535 | 25.1 | –12.5 |
| Majority | | 42 | 2.0 | N/A |
| Turnout | | 2,129 | 39.7 | –0.1 |
| Registered electors | | 5,367 | | |
| Labour gain from Conservative | | Swing | ▲9.5 | |

Bungay
| Party | Candidate | Votes | % | ±% |
|---|---|---|---|---|
| SLD | A. Welsh | 1,274 | 52.8 | +19.4 |
| Conservative | Morris Rose | 1,141 | 47.2 | +3.8 |
| Majority | | 133 | 5.5 | N/A |
| Turnout | | 2,415 | 40.6 | –2.3 |
| Registered electors | | 5,952 | | |
| SLD gain from Conservative | | Swing | ▲7.8 | |

Gunton
| Party | Candidate | Votes | % | ±% |
|---|---|---|---|---|
| Conservative | B. Harvey* | 1,034 | 43.1 | –0.9 |
| SLD | A. Chamberlain | 920 | 38.3 | +3.1 |
| Labour | J. Riches | 446 | 18.6 | –2.2 |
| Majority | | 114 | 4.8 | –4.0 |
| Turnout | | 2,400 | 45.6 | +2.4 |
| Registered electors | | 5,267 | | |
| Conservative hold | | Swing | ▼2.0 | |

Halesworth
| Party | Candidate | Votes | % | ±% |
|---|---|---|---|---|
| SLD | J. Dickson | 1,716 | 68.2 | +40.2 |
| Conservative | Robert Niblett* | 799 | 31.8 | –12.8 |
| Majority | | 917 | 36.5 | N/A |
| Turnout | | 2,515 | 47.3 | +0.5 |
| Registered electors | | 5,319 | | |
| SLD gain from Conservative | | Swing | ▲26.5 | |

Lothingland North
| Party | Candidate | Votes | % | ±% |
|---|---|---|---|---|
| Labour | R. Durrant | 1,081 | 44.5 | –10.1 |
| Conservative | P. Dearne | 1,070 | 44.1 | –1.3 |
| SLD | A. Moles | 276 | 11.4 | N/A |
| Majority | | 11 | 0.5 | –8.6 |
| Turnout | | 2,427 | 35.4 | –5.5 |
| Registered electors | | 6,856 | | |
| Labour hold | | Swing | ▼4.4 | |

Lothingland South
| Party | Candidate | Votes | % | ±% |
|---|---|---|---|---|
| Independent | James Mitchell * | 959 | 37.8 | +3.8 |
| Conservative | J. Seago | 864 | 34.0 | +1.2 |
| Labour | R. Jack | 715 | 28.2 | –5.0 |
| Majority | | 95 | 3.7 | +2.9 |
| Turnout | | 2,538 | 36.3 | +1.3 |
| Registered electors | | 6,995 | | |
| Independent hold | | Swing | ▲1.3 | |

Lowestoft Central
| Party | Candidate | Votes | % | ±% |
|---|---|---|---|---|
| Labour | M. Ramsey* | 1,231 | 63.5 | +4.1 |
| SLD | Andrew Shepherd | 362 | 18.7 | –21.9 |
| Conservative | L. Guy | 347 | 17.9 | N/A |
| Majority | | 869 | 44.8 | +26.0 |
| Turnout | | 1,940 | 30.3 | –5.1 |
| Registered electors | | 6,403 | | |
| Labour hold | | Swing | ▲13.0 | |

Lowestoft St Margarets
| Party | Candidate | Votes | % | ±% |
|---|---|---|---|---|
| Labour | A. Owen | 1,142 | 65.7 | +8.8 |
| Conservative | J. Wright | 421 | 24.2 | +4.7 |
| SLD | G. Wood | 176 | 10.1 | N/A |
| Majority | | 721 | 41.5 | +8.3 |
| Turnout | | 1,739 | 32.7 | +0.6 |
| Registered electors | | 5,316 | | |
| Labour hold | | Swing | ▲2.1 | |

Normanston
| Party | Candidate | Votes | % | ±% |
|---|---|---|---|---|
| Labour | Tom Chipperfield * | 1,878 | 82.1 | +5.4 |
| Conservative | R. Jeffrey | 410 | 17.9 | –5.4 |
| Majority | | 1,468 | 64.2 | +10.8 |
| Turnout | | 2,288 | 35.8 | +3.5 |
| Registered electors | | 6,398 | | |
| Labour hold | | Swing | ▲5.4 | |

Oulton Broad
| Party | Candidate | Votes | % | ±% |
|---|---|---|---|---|
| Conservative | Nick Brighouse | 1,128 | 46.7 | –0.9 |
| Labour | J. Riches | 699 | 28.9 | –1.3 |
| SLD | Sandra Tonge | 385 | 15.9 | –6.4 |
| Ind. Conservative | D. Harvey * | 204 | 8.4 | N/A |
| Majority | | 429 | 17.8 | +0.4 |
| Turnout | | 2,416 | 36.8 | +7.3 |
| Registered electors | | 6,563 | | |
| Conservative hold | | Swing | ▲0.2 | |

Pakefield
| Party | Candidate | Votes | % | ±% |
|---|---|---|---|---|
| Labour | M. Rodgers* | 1,478 | 51.2 | –11.7 |
| Conservative | C. Oldman | 1,129 | 39.1 | +2.0 |
| SLD | A. Knee | 279 | 9.7 | N/A |
| Majority | | 349 | 12.1 | –13.7 |
| Turnout | | 2,886 | 38.7 | –0.6 |
| Registered electors | | 7,467 | | |
| Labour hold | | Swing | ▼6.9 | |

Southwold
| Party | Candidate | Votes | % | ±% |
|---|---|---|---|---|
| Independent | Graham Langley | 1,777 | 66.7 | N/A |
| Conservative | S. Simpson | 886 | 33.3 | –17.3 |
| Majority | | 891 | 33.5 | N/A |
| Turnout | | 2,663 | 52.2 | +1.3 |
| Registered electors | | 5,100 | | |
| Independent gain from Conservative | | Swing | | |

Wainford
| Party | Candidate | Votes | % | ±% |
|---|---|---|---|---|
| Conservative | K. Currie | 882 | 46.0 | –9.3 |
| Labour | A. Hutchinson | 833 | 43.5 | –1.2 |
| SLD | D. O'Neill | 201 | 10.5 | N/A |
| Majority | | 49 | 2.6 | –8.0 |
| Turnout | | 1,916 | 35.1 | +1.4 |
| Registered electors | | 5,456 | | |
| Conservative hold | | Swing | ▼4.1 | |

Whittington
| Party | Candidate | Votes | % | ±% |
|---|---|---|---|---|
| Labour | J. Hore* | 977 | 57.7 | –8.7 |
| Conservative | A. Braithwaite | 559 | 33.0 | –0.6 |
| SLD | I. Crocker | 158 | 9.3 | N/A |
| Majority | | 418 | 24.7 | –8.1 |
| Turnout | | 1,694 | 30.3 | –2.8 |
| Registered electors | | 5,598 | | |
| Labour hold | | Swing | ▼4.1 | |
