= 2017 Suffolk County Council election =

2017 UK local government election

- 4 May 2017

All 75 seats to Suffolk County Council 38 seats needed for a majority
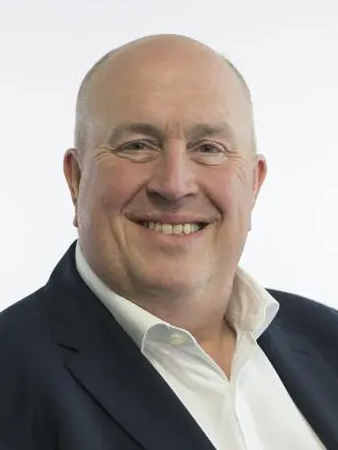

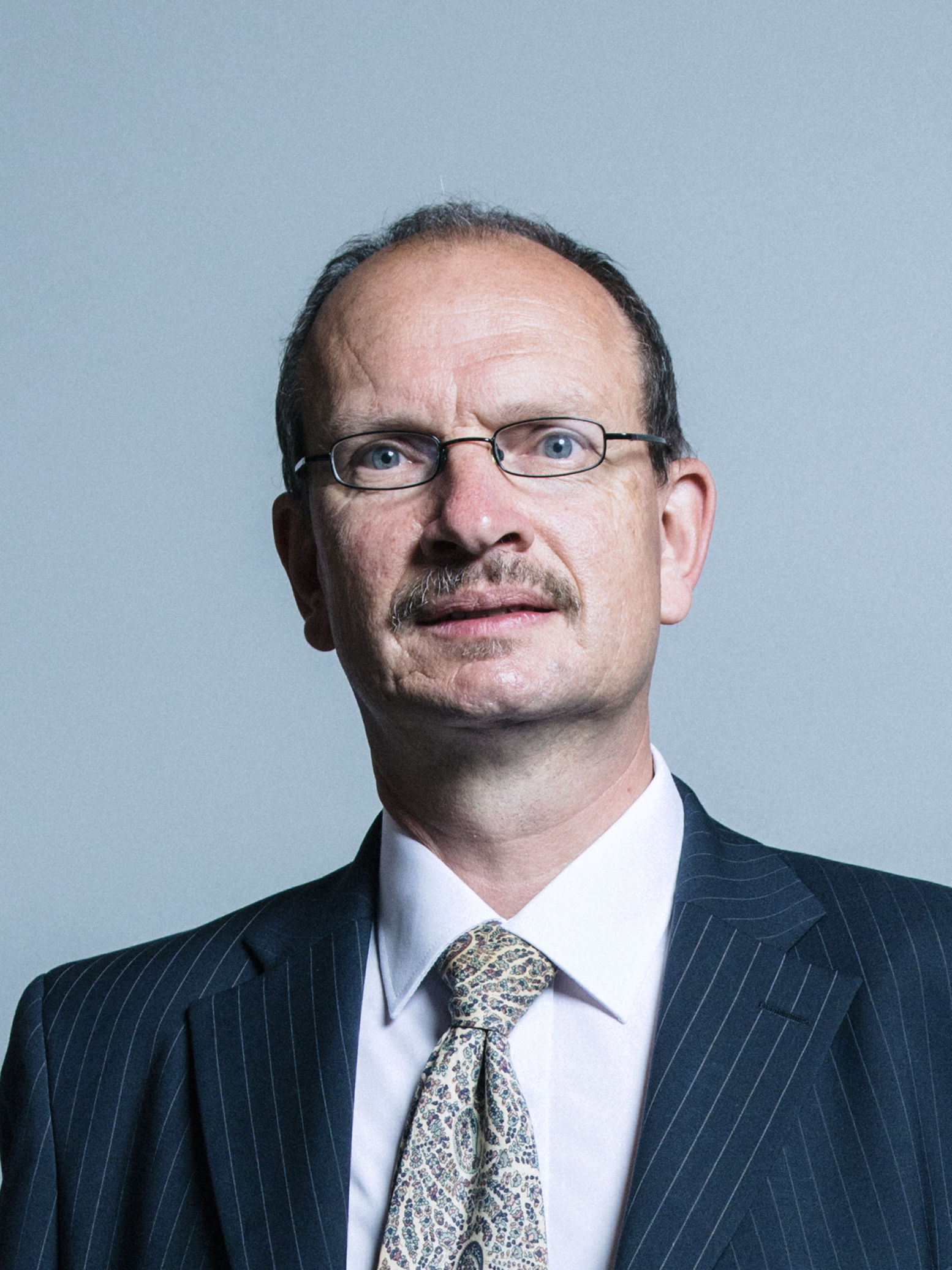

| | First party | Second party | Third party |
|---|---|---|---|
| | | | LD |
| Leader | Colin Noble | Sandy Martin | David Wood |
| Party | Conservative | Labour | Liberal Democrats |
| Leader since | 7 April 2015 | May 2009 | May 2013 |
| Leader's seat | Row Heath | St John's | Peninsula |
| Last election | 39 seats, 35.5% | 15 seats, 21.6% | 7 seats, 20.0% |
| Seats before | 36 | 15 | 8 |
| Seats won | 52 | 11 | 5 |
| Seat change | ▲13 | ▼4 | ▼2 |
| Popular vote | 92,238 | 41,242 | 27,237 |
| Percentage | 46.3% | 20.7% | 13.0% |
| Swing | ▲10.8% | ▼0.9% | ▲3.1% |
| | Fourth party | Fifth party | Sixth party |
| Leader | Mark Ereira-Guyer | n/a | n/a |
| Party | Green | Independent | WSI |
| Leader since | May 2013 | n/a | n/a |
| Leader's seat | Tower (Defeated) | n/a | n/a |
| Last election | 2 seats, 8.8% | 3 seats, 3.6% | Did Not Stand |
| Seats before | 2 | 5 | 0 |
| Seats won | 3 | 3 | 1 |
| Seat change | ▲1 | Steady | ▲1 |
| Popular vote | 16,367 | 8,511 | 1,771 |
| Percentage | 6.0% | 4.3% | 0.9% |
| Swing | ▼0.6% | ▲0.7% | ▲0.9% |
| | Seventh party |
| Leader | James Crossley |
| Party | UKIP |
| Leader since | April 2017 |
| Leader's seat | Whitehouse and Whitton (Retiring) |
| Last election | 9 seats, 20.0% |
| Seats before | 9 |
| Seats won | 0 |
| Seat change | ▼9 |
| Popular vote | 11,974 |
| Percentage | 6.0% |
| Swing | ▼14.0% |
- Map of the results of the 2017 Suffolk council election. Conservatives in blue, Liberal Democrats in yellow, Labour in red, Greens in green and independents in grey.
Leader before election
Colin Noble
Conservative
No overall control
Leader after election
Colin Noble
Conservative

Composition of Suffolk County Council after 2017 election

The 2017 Suffolk County Council election took place on 4 May 2017 as part of the 2017 local elections in the United Kingdom. All 75 councillors were elected from 63 electoral divisions, which returned either one or two county councillors each, by first-past-the-post voting, for a four-year term of office.

Voters who live in divisions which elected two councillors (12 divisions) were entitled to cast a maximum of two votes, while those living in divisions only electing one councillor (51 divisions) were only entitled to cast one vote.

Labour and the Conservatives were the only parties fielding candidates in all 63 electoral divisions. The Liberal Democrats had candidates standing in 58 divisions, while the Green Party stood candidates in 46 divisions and UKIP stood candidates in 43 divisions.

== Previous composition ==
=== 2013 election ===
| Party | Seats |
|---|---|
| Conservative | 39 |
| Labour | 15 |
| UKIP | 9 |
| Liberal Democrats | 7 |
| Independent | 3 |
| Green | 2 |
| Total | 75 |

=== Composition of council seats before election ===
| Party | Seats |
|---|---|
| Conservative | 36 |
| Labour | 15 |
| UKIP | 9 |
| Liberal Democrats | 8 |
| Independent | 5 |
| Green | 2 |
| Total | 75 |

=== Changes between elections ===
In between the 2013 election and the 2017 election, the following council seats changed hands:

| Division | Date | Previous Party | New Party | Cause | Resulting Council Composition | | | | | |
| Division | Date | Previous Party | New Party | Cause | Con | Lab | UKIP | LDem | Grn | Ind |
|---|---|---|---|---|---|---|---|---|---|---|
| Haverhill Cangle | 5 May 2016 | Conservative | UKIP | Sitting councillor died. UKIP won by-election. | 38 | 15 | 10 | 7 | 2 | 3 |
| Hadleigh | 22 September 2016 | Conservative | Liberal Democrats | Sitting councillor disqualified. Liberal Democrats won by-election. | 37 | 15 | 10 | 8 | 2 | 3 |
| Lowestoft South | March 2017 | UKIP | Independent | Councillor quit party to sit as an independent member. | 37 | 15 | 9 | 8 | 2 | 4 |
| Sudbury | March 2017 | Conservative | Independent | Councillor quit party to sit as an independent member. | 36 | 15 | 9 | 8 | 2 | 5 |

== Summary ==
The Conservatives regained much of the ground they lost at the previous election taking a net gain of 15 seats despite only picking up two extra seats in Ipswich.

Labour lost 4 of its 5 seats in Lowestoft but managed to pick up a Sudbury seat that they haven't held since 2009 and remained the main opposition party.

The Lib Dem lost 2 seats and failed to maintain a by election gain in Hadleigh.

The Greens made a net gain of 1, and UKIP lost all their seats.

== Government Formation ==
With 52 seats and a fourth successive victory, the Conservatives were able to form a working majority of 29 in the new Council, with Colin Noble (Row Heath) elected as Council Leader. In May 2018 he was ousted in a party room ballot by cabinet member for waste, fire and the environment Matthew Hicks (Thredling).

Opposition leader Sandy Martin (St John's) stood down after being elected to Parliament in the 2017 general election in June, with Sandra Gage (Rushmere) succeeding him. However, in December 2017 she stood down to be replaced by former deputy group leader Sarah Adams (St John's), who had returned to the council after winning the by-election triggered by Martin's departure.

The Lib Dems and the Greens agreed to form a joint group, with the leadership switching each year, David Wood (Peninsula) the incumbent Lib Dem group leader became the first leader of this new group.

== Overall result ==
2017 Suffolk County Council election
| Party | Seats | Gains | Losses | Net gain/loss | Seats % | Votes % | Votes | +/− |
|---|---|---|---|---|---|---|---|---|
| Conservative | 52 | 18 | 3 | ▲15 | 69.3 | 46.3 | 92,238 | +10.8 |
| Labour | 11 | 1 | 5 | ▼4 | 14.7 | 20.7 | 41,242 | -0.9 |
| Liberal Democrats | 5 | 0 | 3 | ▼3 | 6.7 | 13.7 | 27,237 | +3.1 |
| Green | 3 | 2 | 1 | ▲1 | 4.0 | 8.2 | 16,367 | -0.6 |
| Independent | 3 | 0 | 0 | Steady | 5.3 | 4.3 | 8,511 | +0.7 |
| West Suffolk Independents | 1 | 1 | 0 | ▲1 | 0.0 | 0.9 | 1,771 | N/A |
| UKIP | 0 | 0 | 10 | ▼10 | 0.0 | 6.0 | 11,974 | -14.0 |

== Results by District ==
=== Babergh ===
District Summary

| Party | Seats | +/- | Votes | % | +/- |
|---|---|---|---|---|---|
| Conservative | 6 | ▼1 | 10,463 | 39.5 | +3.7 |
| Liberal Democrat | 1 | ▼1 | 5,880 | 22.2 | +4.3 |
| Labour | 1 | ▲1 | 3,439 | 13.0 | –1.6 |
| Independent | 1 | Steady | 3,007 | 11.3 | +5.2 |
| Green | 1 | ▲1 | 2,424 | 9.1 | –2.0 |
| UKIP | 0 | Steady | 1,293 | 4.9 | –9.6 |

Division Results

Belstead Brook
| Party | Candidate | Votes | % | ±% |
|---|---|---|---|---|
| Conservative | Christopher Hudson | 867 | 40.9 | +7.4 |
| Liberal Democrats | David Busby * | 792 | 37.4 | –0.2 |
| Labour Co-op | David Plowman | 270 | 12.7 | –5.3 |
| UKIP | Stuart Armstrong | 119 | 5.6 | N/A |
| Green | Richard Hardacre | 72 | 3.4 | –7.6 |
| Majority | | 75 | 3.5 | –0.5 |
| Turnout | | 2,124 | 31.8 | +4.0 |
| Registered electors | | 6,670 | | –13 |
| Conservative gain from Liberal Democrats | | Swing | +3.8 | |

Cosford
| Party | Candidate | Votes | % | ±% |
|---|---|---|---|---|
| Green | Robert Lindsay | 1,630 | 48.4 | +8.0 |
| Conservative | Philip Mutton | 1,519 | 45.1 | –6.8 |
| UKIP | Leon Stedman | 115 | 3.4 | N/A |
| Labour | Rickaby Shearly-Sanders | 106 | 3.1 | –4.6 |
| Majority | | 111 | 3.3 | –8.2 |
| Turnout | | 3,370 | 47.8 | +6.1 |
| Registered electors | | 6,938 | | +202 |
| Green gain from Conservative | | Swing | +7.4 | |

Great Cornard
| Party | Candidate | Votes | % | ±% |
|---|---|---|---|---|
| Conservative | Peter Beer * | 902 | 48.9 | +5.9 |
| Labour | Sarah Page | 522 | 28.3 | –3.3 |
| UKIP | Aidan Powlesland | 173 | 9.4 | N/A |
| Liberal Democrats | Marjorie Bark | 157 | 8.5 | +2.0 |
| Green | Dean Walton | 91 | 4.9 | –13.9 |
| Majority | | 380 | 20.6 | +9.3 |
| Turnout | | 1,859 | 26.2 | +1.6 |
| Registered electors | | 7,087 | | +103 |
| Conservative hold | | Swing | +4.6 | |

Hadleigh
| Party | Candidate | Votes | % | ±% |
|---|---|---|---|---|
| Conservative | Mick Fraser | 847 | 39.6 | +8.1 |
| Liberal Democrats | Trevor Sheldrick * | 795 | 37.2 | +13.0 |
| Labour | Sue Monks | 330 | 15.4 | –1.2 |
| UKIP | Christine Hempstead | 91 | 4.3 | –18.5 |
| Green | Lisa Gordon | 75 | 3.5 | –1.3 |
| Majority | | 52 | 2.4 | –4.9 |
| Turnout | | 2,138 | 32.3 | +3.5 |
| Registered electors | | 6,619 | | +181 |
| Conservative hold | | Swing | –2.4 | |

Melford
| Party | Candidate | Votes | % | ±% |
|---|---|---|---|---|
| Independent | Richard Kemp * | 1,614 | 56.0 | +2.8 |
| Conservative | Margaret Maybury | 809 | 28.1 | +11.9 |
| Labour | Paul Watson | 208 | 7.2 | +0.5 |
| Green | John Smith | 131 | 4.5 | –1.1 |
| UKIP | Peter Lynham | 119 | 4.1 | –14.2 |
| Majority | | 805 | 27.9 | –6.9 |
| Turnout | | 2,886 | 36.1 | +2.5 |
| Registered electors | | 7,992 | | +197 |
| Independent hold | | Swing | –4.5 | |

Peninsula
| Party | Candidate | Votes | % | ±% |
|---|---|---|---|---|
| Liberal Democrats | Dave Wood * | 1,337 | 38.9 | –4.2 |
| Independent | Derek Davis | 923 | 26.9 | N/A |
| Conservative | Will Shropshire | 786 | 22.9 | +2.5 |
| Labour | Phil Dunnett | 274 | 8.0 | –1.9 |
| Green | Andrew Sterling | 113 | 3.3 | –2.9 |
| Majority | | 414 | 12.1 | –10.6 |
| Turnout | | 3,433 | 42.3 | +10.5 |
| Registered electors | | 7,986 | | –8 |
| Liberal Democrats hold | | Swing | –15.5 | |

Samford
| Party | Candidate | Votes | % | ±% |
|---|---|---|---|---|
| Conservative | Gordon Jones * | 1,502 | 43.3 | +9.6 |
| Liberal Democrats | Sue Carpendale | 1,410 | 40.6 | +15.2 |
| Labour | Charlie Nixon | 323 | 9.3 | –1.0 |
| UKIP | Steve Laing | 235 | 6.8 | –18.1 |
| Majority | | 92 | 2.7 | –5.6 |
| Turnout | | 3,475 | 43.3 | +4.8 |
| Registered electors | | 8,026 | | +109 |
| Conservative hold | | Swing | –2.8 | |

Stour Valley
| Party | Candidate | Votes | % | ±% |
|---|---|---|---|---|
| Conservative | James Finch * | 1,428 | 51.4 | +8.9 |
| Liberal Democrats | Bryn Hurren | 966 | 34.8 | +7.6 |
| Labour | John Cook | 167 | 6.0 | –2.3 |
| UKIP | James Carver | 121 | 4.4 | –17.7 |
| Green | Lois Hickey | 96 | 3.5 | N/A |
| Majority | | 462 | 16.6 | +1.4 |
| Turnout | | 2,780 | 43.8 | +0.1 |
| Registered electors | | 6,352 | | +240 |
| Conservative hold | | Swing | +0.7 | |

Sudbury
| Party | Candidate | Votes | % | ±% |
|---|---|---|---|---|
| Labour | Jack Owen | 693 | 30.5 | –0.8 |
| Conservative | Adrian Osborne | 631 | 27.8 | –16.5 |
| Independent | John Sayers * | 470 | 20.7 | N/A |
| Liberal Democrats | Andrew Welsh | 262 | 11.5 | –0.7 |
| Green | Julie Fowles-Smith | 124 | 5.5 | –6.7 |
| UKIP | Steven Whalley | 91 | 4.0 | N/A |
| Majority | | 62 | 2.7 | N/A |
| Turnout | | 2,279 | 32.4 | +5.9 |
| Registered electors | | 7,027 | | +38 |
| Labour gain from Conservative | | Swing | +7.8 | |

Sudbury East & Waldingfield
| Party | Candidate | Votes | % | ±% |
|---|---|---|---|---|
| Conservative | Colin Spence * | 1,169 | 53.2 | +7.3 |
| Labour | Luke Cresswell | 546 | 24.9 | +3.7 |
| UKIP | Darren Clarke | 229 | 10.4 | –17.3 |
| Liberal Democrats | Robert Spivey | 161 | 7.3 | N/A |
| Green | John Burch | 92 | 4.2 | –1.1 |
| Majority | | 623 | 28.4 | +10.1 |
| Turnout | | 2,205 | 31.9 | +3.4 |
| Registered electors | | 6,905 | | +196 |
| Conservative hold | | Swing | +1.8 | |

=== Forest Heath ===
District Summary

| Party | Seats | +/- | Votes | % | +/- |
|---|---|---|---|---|---|
| Conservative | 4 | ▲1 | 5,441 | 47.0 | +11.0 |
| West Suffolk Independents | 1 | ▲1 | 1,771 | 15.3 | N/A |
| Labour | 0 | Steady | 1,830 | 15.8 | +1.3 |
| Independent | 0 | Steady | 1,185 | 10.2 | +3.9 |
| UKIP | 0 | ▼2 | 830 | 7.2 | –28.4 |
| Liberal Democrat | 0 | Steady | 513 | 4.4 | –3.1 |

Division Results

Brandon
| Party | | Candidate | Votes | % | ±% |
|---|---|---|---|---|---|
| | West Suffolk Independents | Victor Lukaniuk | 937 | 46.9 | N/A |
| | Conservative | Stephen Frost | 562 | 28.1 | +0.8 |
| | UKIP | Reg Silvester * | 256 | 12.8 | –33.1 |
| | Labour | Susan Dean | 242 | 12.1 | +1.3 |
| Majority | | | 375 | 18.8 | +0.2 |
| Turnout | | | 2,011 | 29.6 | –0.8 |
| Registered electors | | | 6,794 | | –334 |
| style="color:inherit;background-color: 1. 6EFFC5" | | WSI gain from UKIP | | Swing | +23.1 | |

Exning & Newmarket
| Party | Candidate | Votes | % | ±% |
|---|---|---|---|---|
| Conservative | Rachel Hood | 909 | 37.2 | +12.2 |
| Labour | Michael Jefferys | 585 | 23.9 | +3.9 |
| West Suffolk Independents | Simon Cole | 561 | 23.0 | +4.0'"`UNIQ−−ref−00000065−QINU`"' |
| UKIP | Dave Hudson * | 252 | 10.3 | –20.4 |
| Liberal Democrats | Martin Redbond | 136 | 5.6 | +0.3 |
| Majority | | 324 | 13.3 | +7.6 |
| Turnout | | 2,450 | 31.2 | +4.6 |
| Registered electors | | 7,848 | | –972 |
| Conservative gain from UKIP | | Swing | +16.3 | |

Mildenhall
| Party | Candidate | Votes | % | ±% |
|---|---|---|---|---|
| Conservative | Louis Busuttil | 1,405 | 65.5 | +26.2 |
| Independent | David Chandler | 423 | 19.7 | –19.2'"`UNIQ−−ref−0000006B−QINU`"' |
| Labour | Kevin Yarrow | 317 | 14.8 | +0.9 |
| Majority | | 982 | 45.8 | +45.4 |
| Turnout | | 2,152 | 30.8 | –1.0 |
| Registered electors | | 6,994 | | –157 |
| Conservative hold | | Swing | +22.7 | |

Newmarket & Red Lodge
| Party | Candidate | Votes | % | ±% |
|---|---|---|---|---|
| Conservative | Robin Millar * | 1,203 | 50.5 | +5.5 |
| Labour | Joy Uney | 373 | 15.6 | –5.1 |
| UKIP | Roger Dicker | 322 | 13.5 | –14.8 |
| West Suffolk Independents | Andrew Appleby | 273 | 11.5 | N/A |
| Liberal Democrats | Andrew Gillett | 213 | 8.9 | +2.7 |
| Majority | | 830 | 34.8 | +10.9 |
| Turnout | | 2,384 | 25.6 | +2.4 |
| Registered electors | | 9,289 | | –20 |
| Conservative hold | | Swing | +5.5 | |

Row Heath
| Party | Candidate | Votes | % | ±% |
|---|---|---|---|---|
| Conservative | Colin Noble * | 1,362 | 52.4 | +9.1 |
| Independent | David Gathercole | 383 | 14.7 | +3.5 |
| Independent | John Smith | 379 | 14.6 | N/A |
| Labour | Jack Fawbert | 313 | 12.0 | +4.2 |
| Liberal Democrats | Ralph Brownie | 164 | 6.3 | +3.3 |
| Majority | | 979 | 37.6 | +28.7 |
| Turnout | | 2,601 | 32.3 | –0.1 |
| Registered electors | | 8,039 | | +241 |
| Conservative hold | | Swing | +2.7 | |

=== Ipswich ===
District Summary

| Party | Seats | +/- | Votes | % | +/- |
|---|---|---|---|---|---|
| Labour | 9 | ▼1 | 13,711 | 41.2 | +1.4 |
| Conservative | 2 | ▲1 | 12,012 | 36.1 | +11.4 |
| Liberal Democrat | 1 | Steady | 3,781 | 11.4 | +2.7 |
| UKIP | 0 | Steady | 2,160 | 6.5 | –12.5 |
| Green | 0 | Steady | 1,320 | 3.5 | –3.7 |
| Independent | 0 | Steady | 259 | 0.7 | +0.7 |

Division Results

Bixley
| Party | Candidate | Votes | % | ±% |
|---|---|---|---|---|
| Conservative | Paul West * | 1,310 | 55.7 | –2.7 |
| Labour | Paul Anderson | 557 | 23.7 | –1.0 |
| Liberal Democrats | Timothy Lockington | 198 | 8.4 | +2.9 |
| UKIP | Dave Ranson | 166 | 7.1 | N/A |
| Independent | Linda Sharp | 120 | 5.1 | N/A |
| Majority | | 753 | 32.0 | –15.1 |
| Turnout | | 2,354 | 42.0 | +6.9 |
| Registered electors | | 5,651 | | –63 |
| Conservative hold | | Swing | –0.8 | |

Bridge
| Party | Candidate | Votes | % | ±% |
|---|---|---|---|---|
| Labour Co-op | Jack Abbott | 1,036 | 50.0 | +6.1 |
| Conservative | Mark Felix-Thomas | 630 | 30.4 | +10.4 |
| Green | Charlotte Armstrong | 154 | 7.4 | +2.5 |
| Independent | Lynn Turner | 139 | 6.7 | N/A |
| Liberal Democrats | Christopher Wrathall | 114 | 5.5 | +1.3 |
| Majority | | 406 | 19.6 | +2.8 |
| Turnout | | 2,079 | 27.1 | +3.5 |
| Registered electors | | 7,682 | | +463 |
| Labour Co-op hold | | Swing | –2.2 | |

Chantry (2)
| Party | Candidate | Votes | % | ±% |
|---|---|---|---|---|
| Labour | Helen Armitage * | 2,246 | 42.5 | +0.9 |
| Labour | Peter Gardiner | 2,145 | | |
| Conservative | Bob Hall | 2,110 | 39.9 | +18.9 |
| Conservative | Nadia Cenci | 2,069 | | |
| UKIP | Alan Cotterell | 658 | 12.5 | –12.5 |
| Liberal Democrats | Robert Chambers | 271 | 5.1 | +0.5 |
| Liberal Democrats | Maureen Haaker | 257 | | |
| Majority | | 136 | 2.6 | –14.1 |
| Turnout | | 5,194 | 31.5 | +4.4 |
| Registered electors | | 16,486 | | –556 |
| Labour hold | | Swing | –9.0 | |
| Labour hold | | | | |

Gainsborough
| Party | Candidate | Votes | % | ±% |
|---|---|---|---|---|
| Labour | Kim Clements * | 1,081 | 41.3 | –6.2 |
| Conservative | Liz Harsant | 1,078 | 41.2 | +17.0 |
| UKIP | Shayne Pooley | 275 | 10.5 | –11.4 |
| Green | Ben Magrath | 110 | 4.2 | +1.4 |
| Liberal Democrats | Robin Whitmore | 75 | 2.9 | –0.8 |
| Majority | | 3 | 0.1 | –25.5 |
| Turnout | | 2,623 | 32.0 | +4.6 |
| Registered electors | | 8,090 | | –72 |
| Labour hold | | Swing | –11.6 | |

Priory Heath
| Party | Candidate | Votes | % | ±% |
|---|---|---|---|---|
| Labour | Bill Quinton * | 927 | 49.5 | –3.4 |
| Conservative | Andy Shannon | 639 | 34.2 | +16.8 |
| UKIP | Pippa Gordon | 141 | 7.5 | –13.2 |
| Liberal Democrats | Nicholas Jacob | 93 | 5.0 | +0.7 |
| Green | Andrew Patmore | 71 | 3.8 | –0.9 |
| Majority | | 288 | 15.4 | –16.8 |
| Turnout | | 1,875 | 28.6 | +3.7 |
| Registered electors | | 6,566 | | +222 |
| Labour hold | | Swing | –10.3 | |

Rushmere
| Party | Candidate | Votes | % | ±% |
|---|---|---|---|---|
| Labour | Sandra Gage * | 1,429 | 50.5 | +3.3 |
| Conservative | Paul Cawthorn | 997 | 35.2 | +8.7 |
| Liberal Democrats | Edward Packard | 162 | 5.7 | +1.9 |
| UKIP | Jo Grant | 152 | 5.4 | –11.6 |
| Green | Maxwell Phillips | 89 | 3.1 | –0.8 |
| Majority | | 432 | 15.3 | –5.4 |
| Turnout | | 2,832 | 39.2 | +6.4 |
| Registered electors | | 7,216 | | +23 |
| Labour hold | | Swing | –2.7 | |

St Helen's
| Party | Candidate | Votes | % | ±% |
|---|---|---|---|---|
| Labour | Mandy Gaylard * | 1,322 | 54.7 | +9.1 |
| Conservative | Alex Burgess | 664 | 27.5 | +9.3 |
| Liberal Democrats | Julia Barrett | 201 | 8.3 | +0.5 |
| Green | Maria Harrison | 142 | 5.9 | –4.3 |
| UKIP | Wilfred Arasaratnam | 88 | 3.6 | –14.6 |
| Majority | | 658 | 27.2 | –0.1 |
| Turnout | | 2,431 | 31.0 | +4.7 |
| Registered electors | | 7,891 | | +299 |
| Labour hold | | Swing | –0.1 | |

St John's
| Party | Candidate | Votes | % | ±% |
|---|---|---|---|---|
| Labour Co-op | Sandy Martin * | 1,383 | 57.6 | +3.0 |
| Conservative | Steve Flood | 761 | 31.7 | +3.5 |
| Green | Jane Scott | 138 | 5.7 | –5.6 |
| Liberal Democrats | Kenneth Toye | 120 | 5.0 | –0.9 |
| Majority | | 622 | 25.9 | –0.5 |
| Turnout | | 2,406 | 36.1 | +6.3 |
| Registered electors | | 6,674 | | –109 |
| Labour Co-op hold | | Swing | –0.3 | |

St. Margaret's and Westgate (2)
| Party | Candidate | Votes | % | ±% |
|---|---|---|---|---|
| Liberal Democrats | Inga Lockington * | 2,284 | 35.4 | +10.2 |
| Conservative | Chris Chambers | 1,954 | 30.3 | +6.8 |
| Labour | Sarah Adams * | 1,897 | 29.4 | +0.5 |
| Liberal Democrats | Oliver Holmes | 1,869 | | |
| Conservative | Lee Reynolds | 1,697 | | |
| Labour | Jan Parry | 1,541 | | |
| Green | Kirsty Wilmot | 323 | 5.0 | –3.3 |
| Green | John Mann | 287 | | |
| Majority | | 330 | 5.1 | +1.5 |
| Turnout | | 6,103 | 40.2 | +6.4 |
| Registered electors | | 15,180 | | –15 |
| Liberal Democrats hold | | Swing | +1.7 | |
| Conservative gain from Labour | | Swing | +3.1 | |

Whitehouse & Whitton (2)
| Party | Candidate | Votes | % | ±% |
|---|---|---|---|---|
| Conservative | David Goldsmith | 1,869 | 37.8 | +16.1 |
| Labour | Kathy Bole * | 1,833 | 37.1 | +1.1 |
| Labour | Rob Bridgeman | 1,733 | | |
| Conservative | Erion Xhaferaj | 1,409 | | |
| UKIP | Tony Gould | 680 | 13.8 | –15.7 |
| Green | Liz Smith | 293 | 5.9 | –2.8 |
| Liberal Democrats | Martin Hore | 263 | 5.3 | +1.4 |
| Green | Shaun McDonald | 256 | | |
| Liberal Democrats | Malcolm Mitchell | 216 | | |
| Majority | | 36 | 0.7 | –0.6 |
| Turnout | | 4,474 | 29.3 | +1.4 |
| Registered electors | | 15,247 | | –364 |
| Conservative gain from UKIP | | Swing | +15.9 | |
| Labour hold | | Swing | –7.5 | |

=== Mid Suffolk ===
District Summary

| Party | Seats | +/- | Votes | % | +/- |
|---|---|---|---|---|---|
| Conservative | 7 | ▲2 | 13,918 | 49.3 | +14.3 |
| Liberal Democrat | 2 | ▼1 | 5,750 | 20.4 | +6.6 |
| Green | 1 | Steady | 4,171 | 14.8 | –0.8 |
| Labour | 0 | Steady | 3,179 | 11.3 | –0.6 |
| UKIP | 0 | ▼1 | 1,191 | 4.2 | –19.4 |

Division Results

Bosmere
| Party | Candidate | Votes | % | ±% |
|---|---|---|---|---|
| Conservative | Anne Whybrow | 1,169 | 46.0 | +19.0 |
| Liberal Democrats | Steve Phillips | 987 | 38.9 | +5.0 |
| Labour | Tony Elliott | 198 | 7.8 | –1.6 |
| Green | Terence Carter | 185 | 7.3 | +0.9 |
| Majority | | 182 | 7.2 | +0.3 |
| Turnout | | 2,543 | 32.7 | –0.0 |
| Registered electors | | 7,782 | | +94 |
| Conservative gain from Liberal Democrats | | Swing | +7.0 | |

Gipping Valley
| Party | Candidate | Votes | % | ±% |
|---|---|---|---|---|
| Liberal Democrats | John Field * | 1,030 | 40.1 | +8.1 |
| Conservative | John Whitehead | 1,000 | 39.0 | +13.1 |
| Labour | Julie Cuninghame | 249 | 9.7 | –3.8 |
| UKIP | David Bosworth | 203 | 7.9 | –16.2 |
| Green | David Penny | 85 | 3.3 | –1.2 |
| Majority | | 30 | 1.2 | –4.9 |
| Turnout | | 2,567 | 34.2 | +2.9 |
| Registered electors | | 7,398 | | +411 |
| Liberal Democrats hold | | Swing | –2.5 | |

Hartismere
| Party | Candidate | Votes | % | ±% |
|---|---|---|---|---|
| Conservative | Jessica Fleming * | 1,810 | 61.2 | +17.7 |
| Green | Rowland Warboys | 459 | 15.5 | +0.9 |
| Labour | Anthony Scott-Robinson | 431 | 14.6 | +0.1 |
| Liberal Democrats | Josh Townsley | 258 | 8.7 | +3.6 |
| Majority | | 1,351 | 45.7 | +24.3 |
| Turnout | | 2,958 | 37.0 | +4.7 |
| Registered electors | | 8,013 | | +276 |
| Conservative hold | | Swing | +8.4 | |

Hoxne & Eye
| Party | Candidate | Votes | % | ±% |
|---|---|---|---|---|
| Conservative | Guy McGregor * | 1,846 | 56.9 | +11.3 |
| Liberal Democrats | John Blake | 470 | 14.5 | +9.4 |
| Labour Co-op | Garry Deeks | 466 | 14.4 | –2.1 |
| Green | James Hargrave | 268 | 8.3 | –0.1 |
| UKIP | Roger Fouracre | 197 | 6.1 | –18.5 |
| Majority | | 1,376 | 42.4 | +21.3 |
| Turnout | | 3,247 | 42.2 | +5.3 |
| Registered electors | | 7,724 | | +355 |
| Conservative hold | | Swing | +0.9 | |

Stowmarket North & Stowupland
| Party | Candidate | Votes | % | ±% |
|---|---|---|---|---|
| Conservative | Gary Green * | 1,320 | 49.4 | +13.3 |
| Green | Keith Welham | 793 | 29.7 | +14.3 |
| Labour | Susan Hollands | 376 | 14.1 | –5.9 |
| Liberal Democrats | John Curle | 181 | 6.8 | +3.8 |
| Majority | | 527 | 19.7 | +9.1 |
| Turnout | | 2,678 | 26.9 | +1.9 |
| Registered electors | | 9,960 | | +768 |
| Conservative hold | | Swing | –0.5 | |

Stowmarket South
| Party | Candidate | Votes | % | ±% |
|---|---|---|---|---|
| Conservative | Nicholas Gowrley | 921 | 38.3 | +12.8 |
| Liberal Democrats | Keith Scarff | 789 | 32.8 | +9.0 |
| Labour | Nikki Betts | 307 | 12.8 | –1.1 |
| UKIP | Stephen Searle * | 220 | 9.2 | –16.4 |
| Green | Max Betts-Davies | 167 | 6.9 | –4.2 |
| Majority | | 132 | 5.5 | |
| Turnout | | 2,407 | 31.6 | +1.3 |
| Registered electors | | 7,651 | | +168 |
| Conservative gain from UKIP | | Swing | +14.6 | |

Thedwastre North
| Party | Candidate | Votes | % | ±% |
|---|---|---|---|---|
| Conservative | Jane Storey * | 1,927 | 62.2 | +14.8 |
| Green | Andy Mellen | 678 | 21.9 | +9.6 |
| Labour | Ursula Ajimal | 293 | 9.5 | –1.3 |
| Liberal Democrats | Jon James | 199 | 6.4 | +2.0 |
| Majority | | 1,249 | 40.3 | +17.8 |
| Turnout | | 3,101 | 37.3 | +6.0 |
| Registered electors | | 8,306 | | +293 |
| Conservative hold | | Swing | +6.4 | |

Thedwastre South
| Party | Candidate | Votes | % | ±% |
|---|---|---|---|---|
| Liberal Democrats | Penny Otton * | 1,346 | 46.7 | +17.5 |
| Conservative | Gilly Morgan | 1,263 | 43.8 | +16.2 |
| Labour | Philip Cockell | 274 | 9.5 | +1.7 |
| Majority | | 83 | 2.9 | +1.3 |
| Turnout | | 2,888 | 40.0 | +4.7 |
| Registered electors | | 7,215 | | +198 |
| Liberal Democrats hold | | Swing | +0.7 | |

Thredling
| Party | Candidate | Votes | % | ±% |
|---|---|---|---|---|
| Conservative | Matthew Hicks * | 2,066 | 70.0 | +20.5 |
| Liberal Democrats | David Payne | 455 | 15.4 | +9.7 |
| Labour | Stan Robinson | 431 | 14.6 | 5.1 |
| Majority | | 1,611 | 54.6 | +26.3 |
| Turnout | | 2,961 | 38.7 | +3.5 |
| Registered electors | | 7,644 | | +172 |
| Conservative hold | | Swing | +5.4 | |

Upper Gipping
| Party | Candidate | Votes | % | ±% |
|---|---|---|---|---|
| Green | Andrew Stringer * | 1,645 | 53.6 | +0.5 |
| Conservative | Glen Horn | 1,135 | 37.0 | +16.4 |
| Labour | Terry Wilson | 166 | 5.4 | +0.1 |
| Liberal Democrats | Mark Valladares | 122 | 4.0 | +2.8 |
| Majority | | 510 | 16.6 | –15.8 |
| Turnout | | 3,068 | 39.7 | +1.4 |
| Registered electors | | 7,755 | | +199 |
| Green hold | | Swing | –7.9 | |

=== Suffolk Coastal ===
District Summary

| Party | Seats | +/- | Votes | % | +/- |
|---|---|---|---|---|---|
| Conservative | 10 | Steady | 25,773 | 53.3 | +3.4 |
| Liberal Democrat | 1 | Steady | 7,338 | 15.2 | –2.2 |
| Green | 0 | Steady | 3,265 | 6.7 | +4.1 |
| Labour | 0 | Steady | 8,072 | 16.7 | –3.4 |
| UKIP | 0 | Steady | 2,550 | 5.3 | –3.1 |

Division Results

Aldeburgh and Leiston
| Party | Candidate | Votes | % | ±% |
|---|---|---|---|---|
| Conservative | Russ Rainger | 1,288 | 49.4 | +9.8 |
| Labour | Freda Casagrande | 607 | 23.3 | +6.6 |
| UKIP | Roger Ball | 291 | 11.2 | N/A |
| Liberal Democrats | Julia McLean | 270 | 10.3 | +3.1 |
| Green | Peter Ward | 153 | 5.9 | –3.7 |
| Majority | | 681 | 26.1 | +13.5 |
| Turnout | | 2,612 | 35.1 | –0.0 |
| Registered electors | | 7,451 | | +22 |
| Conservative hold | | Swing | +1.6 | |

Blything
| Party | Candidate | Votes | % | ±% |
|---|---|---|---|---|
| Conservative | Richard Smith * | 1,602 | 52.9 | +5.1 |
| Liberal Democrats | James Sandbach | 586 | 19.3 | +2.2 |
| Labour | Mark Turner | 540 | 17.8 | –1.6 |
| Green | Nigel Hiley | 302 | 10.0 | –5.7 |
| Majority | | 1,016 | 33.5 | +5.1 |
| Turnout | | 3,039 | 41.1 | +5.7 |
| Registered electors | | 7,400 | | +353 |
| Conservative hold | | Swing | +1.4 | |

Carlford
| Party | Candidate | Votes | % | ±% |
|---|---|---|---|---|
| Conservative | Robin Vickery | 1,646 | 55.4 | –3.6 |
| Independent | Rose Johnson | 411 | 13.8 | N/A |
| Liberal Democrats | Kay Yule | 311 | 10.5 | +2.6 |
| Labour | Shasha Toptani | 293 | 9.9 | –4.2 |
| Green | Miriam Burns | 185 | 6.2 | N/A |
| UKIP | Michael Coney | 123 | 4.1 | –14.9 |
| Majority | | 1,235 | 41.6 | +1.6 |
| Turnout | | 2,968 | 42.4 | +4.2 |
| Registered electors | | 6,998 | | +65 |
| Conservative hold | | Swing | –8.7 | |

Felixstowe Coastal (2)
| Party | Candidate | Votes | % | ±% |
|---|---|---|---|---|
| Conservative | Graham Newman * | 3,198 | 50.0 | –3.5 |
| Conservative | Steve Wiles | 3,018 | | |
| Labour | Margaret Morris | 1,038 | 16.2 | –10.1 |
| Labour | Corrine Franklin | 1,036 | | |
| Liberal Democrats | Seamus Bennett | 1,028 | 16.1 | –4.0 |
| Liberal Democrats | Jan Candy | 754 | | |
| UKIP | Keith Phair | 727 | 11.4 | N/A |
| Green | Kay Lyndle | 403 | 6.3 | N/A |
| Green | Aidan Semmens | 230 | | |
| Majority | | 2,160 | 33.8 | +6.6 |
| Turnout | | 6,010 | 39.0 | +7.0 |
| Registered electors | | 15,411 | | +69 |
| Conservative hold | | Swing | +3.3 | |
| Conservative hold | | | | |

Felixstowe North & Trimley
| Party | Candidate | Votes | % | ±% |
|---|---|---|---|---|
| Conservative | Stuart Bird | 1,295 | 49.2 | +4.2 |
| Labour | Dave Ablitt | 692 | 26.3 | –10.8 |
| UKIP | David Coutts | 306 | 11.6 | N/A |
| Liberal Democrats | Andrew Marfleet | 235 | 8.9 | –9.0 |
| Green | Jonathan Mulbery | 106 | 4.0 | N/A |
| Majority | | 603 | 22.9 | +15.1 |
| Turnout | | 2,634 | 34.8 | +2.6 |
| Registered electors | | 7,586 | | –104 |
| Conservative hold | | Swing | +7.5 | |

Framlingham
| Party | Candidate | Votes | % | ±% |
|---|---|---|---|---|
| Conservative | Stephen Burroughes * | 1,685 | 57.2 | +12.9 |
| Green | James Holloway | 408 | 13.8 | +3.8 |
| Labour | Kezia Bayfield | 389 | 13.2 | –0.9 |
| Liberal Democrats | Andrew Turner | 310 | 10.5 | +1.8 |
| UKIP | David Owen | 156 | 5.3 | –17.6 |
| Majority | | 1,277 | 43.3 | +21.9 |
| Turnout | | 2,948 | 42.1 | +5.5 |
| Registered electors | | 7,027 | | +58 |
| Conservative hold | | Swing | +4.6 | |

Kesgrave & Rushmere St Andrew (2)
| Party | Candidate | Votes | % | ±% |
|---|---|---|---|---|
| Conservative | Stuart Lawson | 2,840 | 47.2 | +6.1 |
| Conservative | Robert Whiting * | 2,474 | | |
| Labour | Becky Patten | 1,083 | 18.0 | –2.3 |
| Labour | Helen Clarkson | 961 | | |
| Independent | Mark Ling | 543 | 9.0 | N/A |
| Liberal Democrats | Sally Neal | 436 | 7.2 | –2.8 |
| Independent | Jonathan Ogden | 434 | 7.2 | N/A |
| UKIP | David Mears | 390 | 6.5 | –22.1 |
| Liberal Democrats | Jon Neal | 380 | | |
| Green | Barbara Richardson-Todd | 295 | 4.9 | N/A |
| Green | Charlie Zakss | 145 | | |
| Majority | | 1,757 | 29.2 | +16.7 |
| Turnout | | 5,129 | 33.0 | +5.0 |
| Registered electors | | 15,541 | | |
| Conservative hold | | Swing | +4.2 | |
| Conservative hold | | | | |

Martlesham
| Party | Candidate | Votes | % | ±% |
|---|---|---|---|---|
| Conservative | Patricia O'Brien * | 2,542 | 67.6 | +17.1 |
| Liberal Democrats | Mark Gibbons | 458 | 12.2 | –10.2 |
| Labour | Jeremy Hawksley | 446 | 11.9 | –2.5 |
| Green | Betsy Reid | 315 | 8.4 | –4.4 |
| Majority | | 2,084 | 55.4 | +27.3 |
| Turnout | | 3,771 | 41.7 | +5.7 |
| Registered electors | | 9,043 | | +149 |
| Conservative hold | | Swing | +13.7 | |

Wickham
| Party | Candidate | Votes | % | ±% |
|---|---|---|---|---|
| Conservative | Alexander Nicoll | 1,566 | 48.4 | +1.8 |
| Liberal Democrats | Kit Twinch | 684 | 21.2 | +9.3 |
| Labour | Lesley Bensley | 418 | 12.9 | –7.3 |
| UKIP | Trevor Coult | 308 | 9.5 | –11.8 |
| Green | Catherine Walsh | 258 | 8.0 | N/A |
| Majority | | 882 | 27.3 | +2.0 |
| Turnout | | 3,234 | 38.9 | +6.9 |
| Registered electors | | 8,330 | | +170 |
| Conservative hold | | Swing | –3.7 | |

Wilford
| Party | Candidate | Votes | % | ±% |
|---|---|---|---|---|
| Conservative | Andrew Reid * | 1,578 | 56.8 | –5.1 |
| Green | Victoria Hambley | 352 | 12.7 | N/A |
| Liberal Democrats | Nigel Brown | 339 | 12.2 | –3.8 |
| Labour | Philip Harle | 315 | 11.3 | –10.8 |
| UKIP | Garry Debenham | 194 | 7.0 | N/A |
| Majority | | 1,226 | 44.1 | +4.4 |
| Turnout | | 2,778 | 41.8 | +8.8 |
| Registered electors | | 6,652 | | +4 |
| Conservative hold | | Swing | –8.9 | |

Woodbridge
| Party | Candidate | Votes | % | ±% |
|---|---|---|---|---|
| Liberal Democrats | Caroline Page * | 1,547 | 51.4 | +9.7 |
| Conservative | Stephen Attwell | 1,041 | 34.6 | +2.3 |
| Labour | Vicky Jones | 254 | 8.4 | –1.0 |
| Green | Eamonn O'Nolan | 113 | 3.8 | –0.8 |
| UKIP | Ray Tunstall | 55 | 1.8 | –10.3 |
| Majority | | 506 | 16.8 | +7.3 |
| Turnout | | 3,011 | 47.2 | +5.2 |
| Registered electors | | 6,378 | | –18 |
| Liberal Democrats hold | | Swing | +3.6 | |

=== St. Edmundsbury ===
District Summary

| Party | Seats | +/- | Votes | % | +/- |
|---|---|---|---|---|---|
| Conservative | 7 | ▲2 | 17,205 | 49.0 | +11.6 |
| Independent | 2 | Steady | 4,084 | 11.6 | +0.6 |
| Labour | 0 | Steady | 6,890 | 19.6 | +1.7 |
| Liberal Democrat | 0 | Steady | 3,691 | 10.5 | +6.4 |
| Green | 0 | ▼1 | 1,630 | 4.6 | –1.5 |
| UKIP | 0 | ▼1 | 1,599 | 4.6 | –18.8 |

Division Results

Blackbourn
| Party | Candidate | Votes | % | ±% |
|---|---|---|---|---|
| Conservative | Joanna Spicer * | 2,532 | 81.7 | +28.5 |
| Labour | Cyrille Bouché | 568 | 18.3 | +9.9 |
| Majority | | 1,964 | 63.4 | +40.5 |
| Turnout | | 3,117 | 38.7 | +1.6 |
| Registered electors | | 8,045 | | +20 |
| Conservative hold | | Swing | +9.3 | |

Clare
| Party | Candidate | Votes | % | ±% |
|---|---|---|---|---|
| Conservative | Mary Evans * | 2,445 | 66.8 | +20.5 |
| Liberal Democrats | Alex Rolph | 545 | 14.9 | N/A |
| Labour | Robin Davies | 355 | 9.7 | +3.0 |
| UKIP | Stuart Letten | 315 | 8.6 | –22.9 |
| Majority | | 1,900 | 51.9 | +37.2 |
| Turnout | | 3,667 | 42.1 | +2.1 |
| Registered electors | | 8,719 | | +87 |
| Conservative hold | | Swing | +2.8 | |

Eastgate & Moreton Hall
| Party | Candidate | Votes | % | ±% |
|---|---|---|---|---|
| Independent | Trevor Beckwith * | 1,050 | 41.4 | +1.6 |
| Conservative | Peter Thompson | 924 | 36.4 | +5.3 |
| Labour | Elle Zwandahl | 308 | 12.1 | +0.4 |
| Liberal Democrats | Chris Lale | 255 | 10.1 | +6.9 |
| Majority | | 126 | 5.0 | –3.6 |
| Turnout | | 2,542 | 35.1 | +6.4 |
| Registered electors | | 7,244 | | –381 |
| Independent hold | | Swing | –1.8 | |

Hardwick
| Party | Candidate | Votes | % | ±% |
|---|---|---|---|---|
| Conservative | Richard Rout | 1,645 | 58.7 | +28.7 |
| Liberal Democrats | Helen Korfanty | 470 | 16.8 | +5.3 |
| Labour | Nicola Iannelli-Popham | 463 | 16.5 | +4.3 |
| Green | Sara Rae | 224 | 8.0 | N/A |
| Majority | | 1,175 | 42.2 | +40.0 |
| Turnout | | 2,802 | 41.9 | +3.3 |
| Registered electors | | 6,700 | | –274 |
| Conservative hold | | Swing | +11.7 | |

Haverhill Cangle (2)
| Party | Candidate | Votes | % | ±% |
|---|---|---|---|---|
| Conservative | Paula Fox | 1,481 | 38.5 | +4.1 |
| Conservative | Quillon Fox | 1,324 | | |
| Labour | Maureen Byrne | 1,134 | 29.5 | +0.2 |
| Labour | David Smith | 845 | | |
| UKIP | Julian Flood * | 773 | 20.1 | –9.7 |
| Liberal Democrats | Lewis Curtis | 455 | 11.8 | +5.4 |
| Liberal Democrats | Ken Rolph | 376 | | |
| Majority | | 708 | 18.4 | +13.8 |
| Turnout | | 3,462 | 26.1 | +2.6 |
| Registered electors | | 13,259 | | |
| Conservative hold | | Swing | +2.0 | |
| Conservative gain from UKIP | | Swing | +6.9 | |

Haverhill East & Kedington
| Party | Candidate | Votes | % | ±% |
|---|---|---|---|---|
| Conservative | David Roach | 922 | 47.9 | +22.9 |
| Labour | Jason Simpkin | 464 | 24.1 | +2.7 |
| UKIP | Ant Williams | 366 | 19.0 | –20.1 |
| Liberal Democrats | Oliver Forder | 172 | 8.9 | –2.7 |
| Majority | | 458 | 23.8 | +9.7 |
| Turnout | | 1,924 | 27.5 | –0.9 |
| Registered electors | | 7,002 | | –169 |
| Conservative gain from UKIP | | Swing | +21.5 | |

Thingoe North
| Party | Candidate | Votes | % | ±% |
|---|---|---|---|---|
| Conservative | Rebecca Hopfensperger * | 1,989 | 72.9 | +19.2 |
| Labour Co-op | Frederick Rowell | 439 | 16.1 | +7.6 |
| Liberal Democrats | Peter Turner | 302 | 11.1 | N/A |
| Majority | | 1,550 | 56.8 | +23.1 |
| Turnout | | 2,742 | 38.4 | +5.4 |
| Registered electors | | 7,144 | | –621 |
| Conservative hold | | Swing | +5.8 | |

Thingoe South
| Party | Candidate | Votes | % | ±% |
|---|---|---|---|---|
| Conservative | Karen Soons | 2,110 | 68.1 | +18.3 |
| Liberal Democrats | Zigurds Kronbergs | 436 | 14.1 | N/A |
| Labour | Hilary Appleton | 409 | 13.2 | +1.0 |
| UKIP | Dawn Dicker | 145 | 4.7 | –24.3 |
| Majority | | 1,674 | 54.0 | +2.1 |
| Turnout | | 3,110 | 42.5 | +5.9 |
| Registered electors | | 7,317 | | +61 |
| Conservative hold | | Swing | +2.1 | |

Tower (2)
| Party | Candidate | Votes | % | ±% |
|---|---|---|---|---|
| Conservative | Robert Everitt | 1,833 | 22.9 | +3.7 |
| Independent | David Nettleton * | 1,628 | 20.4 | –1.4 |
| Independent | Paul Hopfensperger | 1,623 | 20.3 | N/A |
| Green | Mark Ereira-Guyer * | 1,406 | 17.6 | –5.6 |
| Labour | Quentin Cornish | 998 | 12.5 | –1.6 |
| Labour | Alex Griffin | 907 | | |
| Liberal Democrats | Julia Lale | 507 | 6.3 | +0.1 |
| Liberal Democrats | Sheena Rawlings | 173 | | |
| Majority | | 205 | 2.6 | +0.0 |
| Turnout | | 5,147 | 33.1 | +3.5 |
| Registered electors | | 15,566 | | |
| Conservative gain from Green | | Swing | +4.7 | |
| Independent hold | | Swing | –10.9 | |

=== Waveney ===
District Summary

| Party | Seats | +/- | Votes | % | +/- |
|---|---|---|---|---|---|
| Conservative | 11 | ▲6 | 22,315 | 44.5 | +12.3 |
| Labour | 1 | ▼4 | 13,585 | 27.1 | –4.2 |
| Green | 1 | ▲1 | 6,048 | 12.0 | +0.6 |
| UKIP | 0 | ▼3 | 4,945 | 9.9 | –12.1 |
| Liberal Democrat | 0 | Steady | 2,469 | 4.9 | +1.7 |
| Independent | 0 | Steady | 837 | 1.7 | N/A |

Division Results

Beccles (2)
| Party | Candidate | Votes | % | ±% |
|---|---|---|---|---|
| Conservative | Mark Bee * | 2,241 | 42.3 | +6.6 |
| Green | Elfrede Brambley-Crawshaw | 2,189 | 41.3 | +15.4 |
| Conservative | Graham Catchpole | 2,031 | | |
| Green | Josi Horne | 1,446 | | |
| Labour | Tarik Lahin | 541 | 10.2 | –8.8 |
| Labour | Nasima Begum | 388 | | |
| UKIP | Pat Hawes | 224 | 4.2 | –12.5 |
| UKIP | Mike Shaw | 194 | | |
| Liberal Democrats | Caroline Way | 105 | 2.0 | –0.7 |
| Liberal Democrats | Simon Macdowall | 96 | | |
| Majority | | 52 | 1.0 | –8.8 |
| Turnout | | 4,843 | 41.3 | +3.6 |
| Registered electors | | 11,727 | | |
| Conservative hold | | Swing | –4.4 | |
| Green gain from Conservative | | | | |

Bungay
| Party | Candidate | Votes | % | ±% |
|---|---|---|---|---|
| Conservative | David Ritchie * | 1,534 | 53.1 | +7.9 |
| Labour | Sue Collins | 758 | 26.2 | +8.9 |
| Green | Pauline Midwinter | 280 | 9.7 | –20.0 |
| Liberal Democrats | Dave O'Neill | 173 | 6.0 | –1.8 |
| UKIP | Andrew Bols | 144 | 5.0 | N/A |
| Majority | | 776 | 26.9 | +11.4 |
| Turnout | | 2,895 | 39.5 | +3.9 |
| Registered electors | | 7,324 | | –120 |
| Conservative hold | | Swing | –0.5 | |

Gunton (2)
| Party | Candidate | Votes | % | ±% |
|---|---|---|---|---|
| Conservative | Steve Ardley | 1,569 | 37.3 | +11.7 |
| Labour | Keith Patience * | 1,517 | 36.0 | –2.3 |
| Conservative | Mary Rudd | 1,511 | | |
| Labour | Janet Craig * | 1,471 | | |
| UKIP | Bernie Guymer | 570 | 13.5 | –11.9 |
| UKIP | Jenny Hinton | 503 | | |
| Green | Emma Bateman | 297 | 7.1 | +0.3 |
| Liberal Democrats | Steven Taylor | 258 | 6.1 | +2.2 |
| Green | Rupert Butley | 201 | | |
| Majority | | 52 | 1.2 | –11.5 |
| Turnout | | 4,121 | 27.5 | –8.1 |
| Registered electors | | 14,993 | | |
| Conservative gain from Labour | | Swing | +7.0 | |
| Labour hold | | | | |

Halesworth
| Party | Candidate | Votes | % | ±% |
|---|---|---|---|---|
| Conservative | Tony Goldson * | 1,545 | 53.5 | +0.3 |
| Labour | Peter Coghill | 608 | 21.1 | –6.5 |
| Green | Alice Bull | 290 | 10.0 | –4.7 |
| Liberal Democrats | Sarah Hunt | 249 | 8.6 | +4.1 |
| UKIP | James Scott | 196 | 6.8 | N/A |
| Majority | | 937 | 32.4 | +6.9 |
| Turnout | | 2,898 | 39.3 | +3.8 |
| Registered electors | | 7,381 | | –75 |
| Conservative hold | | Swing | +3.4 | |

Kessingland & Southwold
| Party | Candidate | Votes | % | ±% |
|---|---|---|---|---|
| Conservative | Michael Ladd * | 1,392 | 48.9 | +11.3 |
| Liberal Democrats | David Beavan | 498 | 17.5 | +14.8 |
| Labour | Paul Tyack | 497 | 17.5 | –4.2 |
| UKIP | Jean Difford | 308 | 10.8 | –20.6 |
| Green | Callum Rollo | 150 | 5.3 | –1.3 |
| Majority | | 894 | 31.4 | +25.3 |
| Turnout | | 2,850 | 38.3 | +1.1 |
| Registered electors | | 7,450 | | –201 |
| Conservative hold | | Swing | –1.7 | |

Lowestoft South (2)
| Party | Candidate | Votes | % | ±% |
|---|---|---|---|---|
| Conservative | Jenny Ceresa | 1,582 | 39.0 | +18.9 |
| Conservative | Jamie Starling | 1,455 | | |
| Labour | Tess Gandy | 1,174 | 29.0 | –4.8 |
| Labour | David Finnigan | 1,167 | | |
| UKIP | Peter Collecott | 489 | 12.1 | –23.5 |
| UKIP | Steve Harvey | 444 | | |
| Independent | Desmond Baldry | 428 | 10.6 | N/A |
| Independent | Bill Mountford * | 409 | | |
| Green | Peter Lang | 203 | 5.0 | –0.3 |
| Green | Mark Morgan | 191 | | |
| Liberal Democrats | Sandra Tonge | 179 | 4.4 | –0.9 |
| Liberal Democrats | Darius McCarthy | 160 | | |
| Majority | | 408 | 10.1 | |
| Turnout | | 4,135 | 28.0 | +0.5 |
| Registered electors | | 14,766 | | –267 |
| Conservative gain from UKIP | | Swing | +21.2 | |
| Conservative gain from UKIP | | | | |

Oulton (2)
| Party | Candidate | Votes | % | ±% |
|---|---|---|---|---|
| Conservative | James Reeder | 2,274 | 48.3 | +20.3 |
| Conservative | Keith Robinson | 2,139 | | |
| Labour | Len Jacklin * | 1,394 | 29.6 | +0.3 |
| Labour | Lynne Ward | 1,368 | | |
| UKIP | George Hawes | 607 | 12.9 | –18.5 |
| UKIP | Bert Poole * | 515 | | |
| Green | Sally Phillips | 232 | 4.9 | –2.7 |
| Green | Peter Eyres | 225 | | |
| Liberal Democrats | Chris Thomas | 201 | 4.3 | +0.1 |
| Liberal Democrats | Patrick Gillard | 145 | | |
| Majority | | 880 | 18.7 | |
| Turnout | | 4,693 | 30.3 | –0.3 |
| Registered electors | | 15,472 | | |
| Conservative gain from UKIP | | Swing | +19.4 | |
| Conservative gain from Labour | | Swing | +10.0 | |

Pakefield (2)
| Party | Candidate | Votes | % | ±% |
|---|---|---|---|---|
| Conservative | Melanie Vigo di Gallidoro | 1,569 | 42.2 | +14.1 |
| Conservative | Craig Rivett | 1,473 | | |
| Labour | Peter Byatt * | 1,369 | 36.8 | +3.2 |
| Labour | Sonia Barker * | 1,333 | | |
| UKIP | Robin Hinton | 384 | 10.3 | –20.0 |
| UKIP | Phillip Trindall | 367 | | |
| Liberal Democrats | Adam Robertson | 215 | 5.8 | +2.4 |
| Liberal Democrats | Christian Newsome | 190 | | |
| Green | Rachel Fawkes | 182 | 4.9 | +0.3 |
| Green | Ben Quail | 162 | | |
| Majority | | 200 | 5.4 | |
| Turnout | | 3,715 | 31.0 | +0.2 |
| Registered electors | | 11,975 | | |
| Conservative gain from Labour | | Swing | +5.5 | |
| Conservative gain from Labour | | | | |
