= Colin Noble =

Colin Noble may refer to:

- Colin Noble (politician)
- Colin Noble (racing driver)
