= Sudbury East and Waldingfield Division, Suffolk =

Electoral division in Suffolk

Sudbury East and Waldingfield
- County Council constituency for the Suffolk County Council
- District: Babergh
- Region: East of England
- Population: 9,027 (2019)
- Electorate: 6,715 (2021)
- Major settlements: Acton, Chilton, Great Waldingfield, Sudbury

Current constituency
- Created: 2005
- Seats: 1
- Councillor: Philip Faircloth-Mutton (Reform UK)
- Local council: Babergh District Council
- Created from: Stour Valley, Sudbury
- Replaced by: Cosford, Cornard & Sudbury East, Stour Valley, Sudbury West

Sudbury East and Waldingfield Division is an electoral division in Babergh District, Suffolk which returns a single County Councillor to Suffolk County Council.

== Geography ==
The division contains the eastern part of Sudbury as well as the villages to the north east of the town. It has higher-than-average proportion of people over the age of 50.

== History ==
The seat has been held by the Conservative since it was first formed, although they have only once passed 50% of the vote. UKIP have also polled well in this seat, finishing second twice, in 2009 & 2013.

It is set to be largely replaced by the redrawn Stour Valley in 2025.

== Boundaries and boundary changes ==
=== 2005–present ===
- Babergh District Wards of Sudbury East, Waldingfield

== Members for Sudbury ==
Member	Party	Term
Colin Spence	Conservative	2005–2021
Philip Faircloth-Mutton	Conservative; Reform UK	2021–19 September 2025; 19 September 2025 – present

== Election results ==
=== Elections in the 2020s ===
2021 Suffolk County Council election:Sudbury East and Waldingfield
Party	Candidate	Votes	%	±%
Conservative	Philip Faircloth-Mutton	955	41.7	–11.5
Independent	Margaret Maybury	410	17.9	N/A
Labour	Louise Fowler	359	15.7	–9.2
Independent	Luke Cresswell	345	15.1	N/A
Green	Theresa Munson	222	9.7	+5.5
Majority		545	23.8	–4.6
Turnout		2,303	34.3	+2.4
Registered electors		6,715		–190
Conservative hold		Swing	–14.7	
