= Sudbury Division, Suffolk =

Electoral division in Suffolk

Sudbury
- County Council constituency for the Suffolk County Council
- District: Babergh
- Region: East of England
- Population: 9,136 (2019)
- Electorate: 6,949 (2021)
- Major settlements: Ballingdon, Sudbury

Current constituency
- Created: 1973
- Seats: 1
- Councillor: Jessie Carter (Green)
- Local council: Babergh District Council
- Replaced by: Sudbury West

Sudbury Division is an electoral division in Babergh District, Suffolk which returns a single County Councillor to Suffolk County Council.

== Geography ==
The division is almost entirely urban and contains most of the town of Sudbury as well as the strip of land between the town and the Essex border. It has a more diverse population than Babergh in general. It was formed of the whole of Sudbury until 2005 with the creation of Sudbury East and Waldingfield Division.

== History ==
Historically Labour has performed better in this division than in most of rural Suffolk, indeed it was one of only two division outside of Ipswich that the party won in 2017.

It was set to be replaced by the new Sudbury West Division in 2025.

== Boundaries and boundary changes ==
=== 1985–2005 ===
- Babergh District Wards of Sudbury East, Sudbury North, Sudbury South.

=== 2005–present ===
- Babergh District Wards of Sudbury North, Sudbury South.

== Members for Sudbury ==
| Member | Party | Term |
|---|---|---|
| A Herbert | Independent | 1973–1977 |
| W Barker | Conservative | 1977–1985 |
| Elizabeth Wiles | Labour | 1985–2001 |
| Nicholas Irwin | Labour | 2001–2005 |
| Jack Owen | Labour | 2005–2009 |
| John Sayers | Conservative | 2009–2017 |
| John Sayers | Independent | 2017 |
| Jack Owen | Labour | 2017–2021 |
| Jessie Carter | Green | 2021–present |

== Election results ==
=== Elections in the 2020s ===
2021 Suffolk County Council election:Sudbury
| Party | Candidate | Votes | % | ±% |
|---|---|---|---|---|
| Green | Jessie Carter | 1,056 | 42.0 | +36.6 |
| Conservative | Simon Sudbury | 721 | 28.7 | +0.9 |
| Labour | Jake Thomas | 376 | 15.0 | –15.6 |
| Independent | Trevor Cresswell | 192 | 7.6 | N/A |
| Liberal Democrats | Robert Spivey | 168 | 6.7 | –4.9 |
| Majority | | 335 | 13.3 | +10.6 |
| Turnout | | 2,535 | 36.5 | +4.2 |
| Registered electors | | 6,949 | | –78 |
| Green gain from Labour | | Swing | +26.1 | |

=== Elections in the 2010s ===
2017 Suffolk County Council election:Sudbury
| Party | Candidate | Votes | % | ±% |
|---|---|---|---|---|
| Labour | Jack Owen | 693 | 30.5 | –0.8 |
| Conservative | Adrian Osborne | 631 | 27.8 | –16.5 |
| Independent | John Sayers * | 470 | 20.7 | N/A |
| Liberal Democrats | Andrew Welsh | 262 | 11.5 | –0.7 |
| Green | Julie Fowles-Smith | 124 | 5.5 | –6.7 |
| UKIP | Steven Whalley | 91 | 4.0 | N/A |
| Majority | | 62 | 2.7 | N/A |
| Turnout | | 2,279 | 32.4 | +5.9 |
| Registered electors | | 7,027 | | +38 |
| Labour gain from Conservative | | Swing | +7.8 | |
