= Colin Noble (politician) =

British politician

Cllr Colin Noble
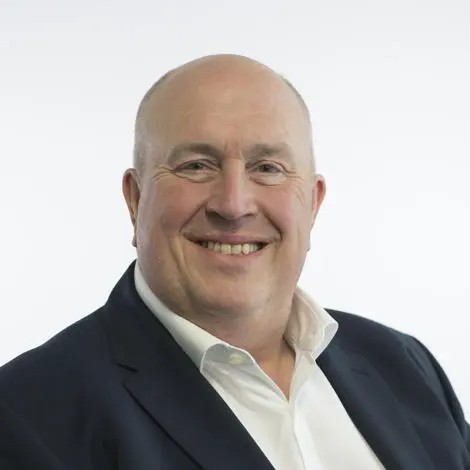
- Official Portrait, 2021

Leader of Suffolk County Council
- In office 21 May 2015 – 24 May 2018
- Deputy: Christopher Hudson; Jane Storey
- Preceded by: Mark Bee
- Succeeded by: Matthew Hicks

Cabinet Member for Finances and Resources at Suffolk County Council
- In office Jun 2013 – May 2014

Cabinet Member for Adult & Community Services at Suffolk County Council
- In office Jul 2009 – May 2013

West Suffolk District Councillor for Lakenheath
- In office 6 May 2021 – 4 May 2023
- Preceded by: David Gathercole
- Succeeded by: Tracy Whitehand

Forest Heath District Councillor for Lakenheath
- In office 5 May 2011 – 2 May 2019
- Preceded by: Simon Flack
- Succeeded by: Seat Abolished

Suffolk County Councillor for Row Heath
- Incumbent
- Assumed office 8 June 2006
- Preceded by: Matthew Edwards

Personal details
- Born: 10 June 1965 (age 60) Newmarket, Suffolk, England
- Party: Conservative
- Website: askcolinnoble.com

Colin Lawrence Noble (born 10 June 1965) is a British politician of the Conservative Party. He was leader of the Suffolk Conservatives group and Leader of Suffolk County Council from May 2015 to May 2018.

== Political career ==
Noble joined the Conservative Party in 1984 and was a local branch activist from 1999. In 2002 Noble was elected Deputy Chairman Political of the West Suffolk Conservative Association; after three years he was elected Chairman for a 4 year term then vice-President and President. In 2011 Noble was appointed Chairman of Norwich North Conservative Association and stepped down in 2013 when Norwich North and Norwich South Conservative Associations formed a Federation.

In 2005 Noble was elected an officer of the Norfolk and Suffolk Conservative Area Executive then in 2008 Noble was elected Deputy Chairman Political. From 2011 to 2014, he was elected as the Norfolk and Suffolk Area Chairman. In 2014 Noble was elected Additional Officer of the Eastern Region Executive, in September 2017 Noble was elected Deputy Chairman (Political) and elected Regional Chairman for the Conservative Party from 2021 to 2024.

Noble was elected to the Conservative Councillors Association board in January 2019 and served on it as the county representative till January 2020.

In March 2019 he became a board member and Commissioner of the Independent Commission on Civil Aviation Noise, an advisory non-departmental public body, sponsored by the Department of Transport and served a three year term until 2023.

=== County Council ===
He was first elected as a County Councillor at a by-election for the county electoral division of Row Heath in the constituency of West Suffolk on 8 June 2006. On 21 May 2009 Colin was appointed as Cabinet Member for Adult Social Care and on 23 May 2013 he became Cabinet Member for Finance.

He became Leader of the Conservative group on Suffolk County Council on 7 April 2015. At the annual general meeting of Suffolk County Council on 21 May 2015 he was duly elected Leader of Suffolk County Council. At the Suffolk County Council Conservative leadership election held on 11 May 2018 Colin was defeated by County Councillor Matthew Hicks and left office as Leader of Suffolk County Council on 24 May 2018 at its Annual General Meeting.

=== District Council ===
Noble was elected to Forest Heath District Council at the 2011 United Kingdom local elections as one of the two District Councillors for Lakenheath ward. He served until Forest Heath merged with St Edmundsbury in 2019, when he was unsuccessful in winning a seat in the new West Suffolk District Council. A by election victory in 2021 gave him an opportunity to return but he was again defeated in 2023.

== Personal life ==
Colin Noble was born in Newmarket, West Suffolk. His father, Lawrence Noble, died in a road accident in Suffolk in May 2016.

He attended school at King's Ely in Ely, Cambridgeshire. He lives with his partner Lisa in the village of Lakenheath in north-west Suffolk.

== Electoral history ==
Suffolk County Council elections: Row Heath By-Election 8th June 2006
Party	Candidate	Votes	%	±%
Conservative	Colin Noble	1,222	61.5	+20.7
UKIP	Ian Smith	297	14.9	+5.6
Labour	David Bowman	219	11.0	−11.1
Liberal Democrats	Tim Huggan	118	5.9	−7.1
Independent	David Chandler	110	5.5	−9.3
Independent	David Hitchman	22	1.1	+1.1
Majority		925	46.6	
Turnout		1,988	27.0	
Conservative hold		Swing		

2009 Suffolk County Council election: Row Heath 4th June 2009
Party	Candidate	Votes	%	±%
Conservative	Colin Noble	1,466	52.5	
UKIP	Ian Smith	842	30.1	
Liberal Democrats	Eleanor Minshall	307	11	
Labour	Thomas Caple	178	6.4	
Majority		624		
Turnout		2824	39	
Conservative hold		Swing		

2013 Suffolk County Council election: Row Heath 2nd May 2013
Party	Candidate	Votes	%	±%
Conservative	Colin Noble	1,104	43.43	−9.1
UKIP	Ian Smith	881	34.66	
Independent	David Gathercole	284	11.17	
Labour	Pamela Brown	197	7.75	
Liberal Democrats	Eleanor Minshall	76	2.99	
Majority		223	8.8	−13.6
Turnout		2542	32.85	−9.9
Conservative hold		Swing		

2017 Suffolk County Council election: Row Heath 4th May 2017
Party	Candidate	Votes	%	±%
Conservative	Colin Noble	1,362	52.4	+9.1
Independent	David Gathercole	383	14.7	+3.5
Independent	John Smith	379	14.6	N/A
Labour	Jack Fawbert	313	12	+4.2
Liberal Democrats	Ralph Brownie	164	6.3	+3.3
Majority		979	37.6	
Turnout		2,601	32.3	
Conservative hold		Swing		

2021 Suffolk County Council election: Row Heath 6th May 2021
Party	Candidate	Votes	%	±%
Conservative	Colin Noble	1,620	59.9	+9.1
Labour	Theresa Chipulina	387	14.3	+4.2
Independent	Don Waldron	369	13.6	N/A
Green Party (England and Wales)	Clare Unwin	305	11.3	N/A
Majority		1233	45.57	+13.27
Turnout		2706	29.6	
Conservative hold		Swing		

See also

- East of England Local Government Association
- Local government in Suffolk

Civic offices
Preceded by Mark Bee	Leader of Suffolk County Council; May 2015 – May 2018	Succeeded by Matthew Hicks
