= Peninsula Division, Suffolk =

Electoral division in Suffolk

Peninsula
- County Council constituency for the Suffolk County Council
- District: Babergh
- Region: East of England
- Population: 10,290 (2019)
- Electorate: 7,994 (2021)
- Major settlements: Brantham, Holbrook, Shotley

Current constituency
- Created: 1985
- Seats: 1
- Councillor: Simon Harley (Green)
- Local council: Babergh District Council
- Created from: Samford No. 1

Peninsula Division is an electoral division in Babergh District, Suffolk which returns a single County Councillor to Suffolk County Council.

== Geography ==
It covers the Shotley Peninsula, comprising the entirety of the Brantham, Ganges and Stour Wards plus parts of Orwell Ward.

== History ==
After being held by the Lib Dems for most of its existence (including by group leader David Wood), it was won by the Greens after the Lib Dems did not contest the seat in 2021.

== Boundaries and boundary changes ==
=== 1985–2005 ===
- Babergh District Wards of Alton, Berners, Holbrook and Shotley.

=== 2005–present ===
- Babergh District Wards of Alton, Berners and Holbrook.

== Members for Peninsula ==
Member	Party	Term
Janet Law	Liberal Democrats	1985–1989
J Delves	Conservative	1989–1993
Penny Clarke	Liberal Democrats	1993–2000
David Wood	Liberal Democrats	2000–2021
Simon Harley	Green	2021–present

== Election results ==
=== Elections in the 2020s ===
2021 Suffolk County Council election: Peninsula
Party	Candidate	Votes	%	±%
Green	Simon Harley	1,444	42.4	+39.1
Conservative	Mary Mclaren	1,029	30.2	+7.3
Independent	Alastair McCraw	699	20.5	N/A
Labour	Keith Rawlings	237	7.0	–1.0
Majority		415	12.2	
Turnout		3,425	42.8	+0.5
Registered electors		7,994		
Green gain from Liberal Democrats		Swing	+15.9	
