= Carlford Division, Suffolk =

Electoral division of Suffolk, England

Carlford
- County Council constituency for the Suffolk County Council
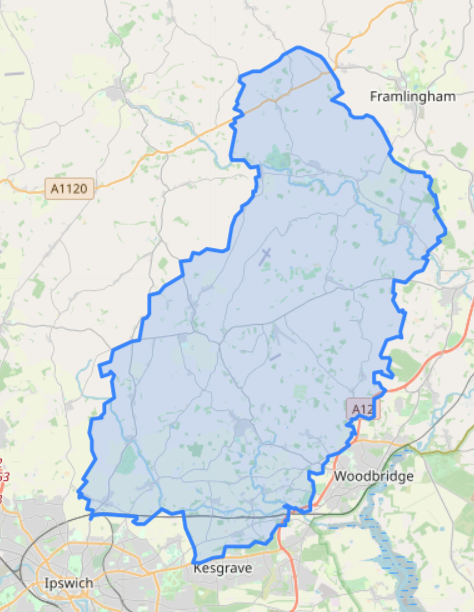
- Carlford Electoral Division
- District: East Suffolk
- Region: East of England
- Population: 9,029 (2019)
- Electorate: 7,263 (2021)
- Major settlements: Grundisburgh

Current constituency
- Created: 1985
- Seats: 1
- Councillor: Elaine Bryce (Conservative)
- Local council: East Suffolk District Council
- Created from: Deben No. 3

Carlford Division is an electoral division of Suffolk which returns one county councillor to Suffolk County Council.

== Geography ==
Carlford is a entirely rural division covering the villages north east of Ipswich and south west of Framlingham. It contains a considerably higher-than-average proportion of people over the age of 45.

== History ==
Like many rural parts of Suffolk, Carlford has historically been a stronghold for the Conservative Party and has never failed to elect a Tory County Councillor.

On 8 June 2020 Robin Vickery, the then County Councillor resigned following over 600 complaints were made concerning racist posts he had shared on Facebook. He resigned before a Council investigation could be put in place, also resigning as a Borough councillor for Castle Hill Ward, Ipswich and from the Conservative Party. Suffolk County Council stated that in light of the COVID-19 pandemic, the seat would not be contested until May 2021.

== Boundaries and boundary changes ==
=== 1985–2005 ===
- Suffolk Coastal District Wards of Bealings, Grundisburgh and Witnesham, and Rushmere.

=== 2005–present ===
- Suffolk Coastal District Wards of Earl Soham, Grundisburgh, Otley and Witnesham.

== Members for Carlford ==
Member	Party	Term
Simon Bestow	Conservative	1985–2001
Steven Hudson	Conservative	2001–2005
Peter Bellfield	Conservative	2005–2016
Robin Vickery	Conservative	2016–2020
Elaine Bryce	Conservative	2021–present

== Election results ==
=== Elections in the 2020s ===
2021 Suffolk County Council election: Carlford
Party	Candidate	Votes	%	±%
Conservative	Elaine Bryce	2,056	63.2	+7.8
Green	Daniel Philip Clery	698	21.4	+11.4
Labour	Alistair Dick	500	15.4	–2.4
Majority		1,358	41.8	+0.2
Turnout		3,287	45.3	
Registered electors		7,263		
Conservative hold		Swing	–1.8	
