= Gunton, Suffolk =

Suburb of Lowestoft, Suffolk, England

Coordinates: 52.500°N 1.748°E

Gunton
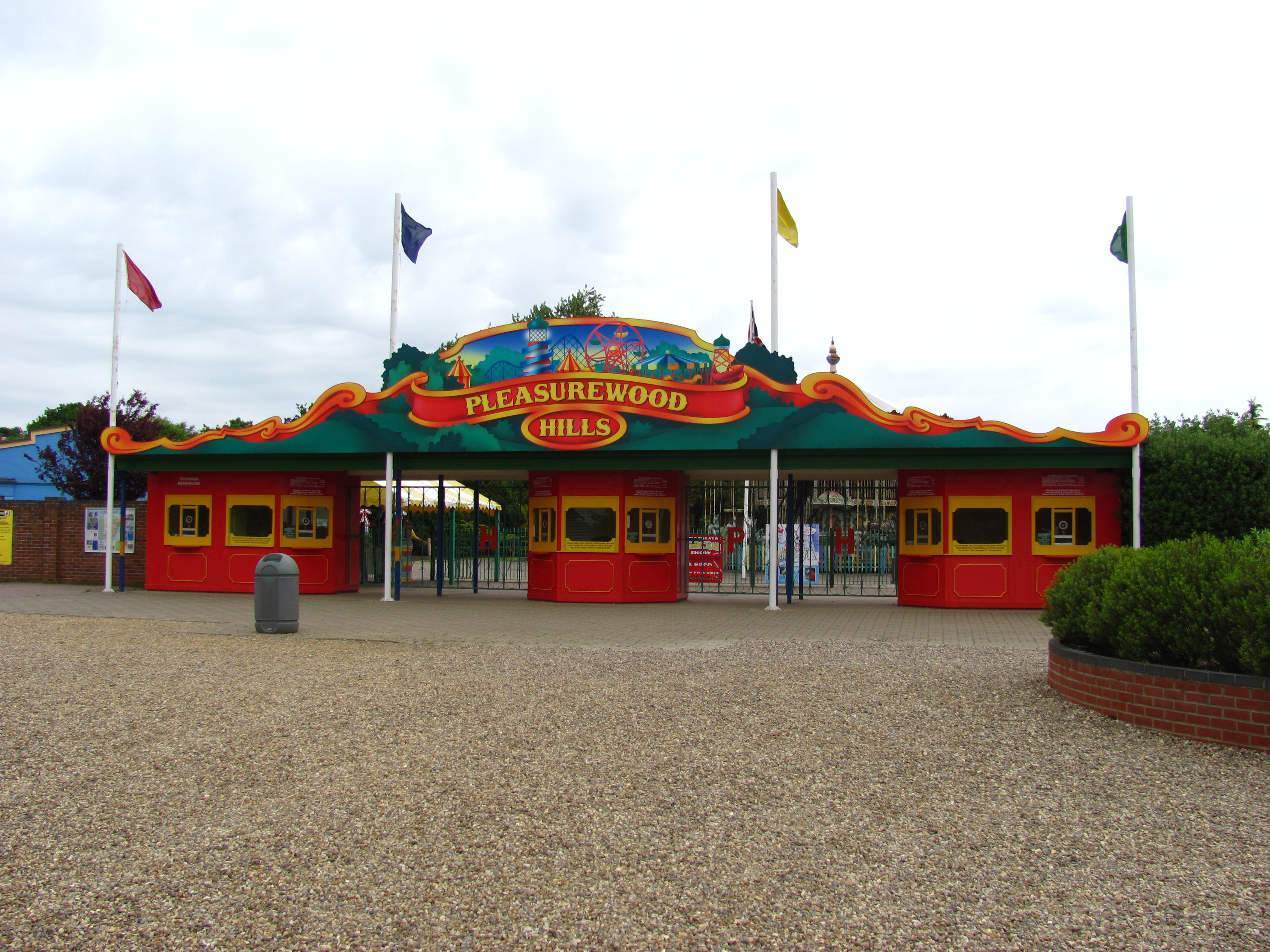
- Pleasurewood Hills theme park

- Location within Suffolk
- Population: 6,640 (2011 est.)
- OS grid reference: TM545957
- Civil parish: Lowestoft
- District: East Suffolk
- Shire county: Suffolk
- Region: East
- Country: England
- Sovereign state: United Kingdom
- Post town: Lowestoft
- Postcode district: NR32
- Dialling code: 01502
- UK Parliament: Lowestoft

Gunton is a suburb of Lowestoft, in the East Suffolk district, in the English county of Suffolk. Gunton was a small coastal village, but over the years it has been suburbanised. Gunton has an estimated population of 6,640. The main A47 or Yarmouth Road runs through the area. The eastern part of Gunton, from Yarmouth Road to Gunton Cliff, is one of the most affluent parts of Lowestoft, after the North Broads area of Oulton Broad.

Hollingsworth Road, the main road through west Gunton, is named after the philanthropist Howard Hollingsworth who lived at Gunton Cliff.

Gunton was home to Roland Leighton and his family, and it is described by Vera Brittain in her First World War autobiography Testament of Youth.

== History ==
In 1931 the parish had a population of 110. On 1 April 1934 the parish was abolished and merged with Lowestoft.

== Attractions ==
The Pleasurewood Hills theme park is located on the outskirts of the village. Gunton Church is a round tower church.

Gunton Cliffs and Warren is a local nature reserve situated east of the B1385 Corton Road between Tramps Alley and to the south, Links Road. It is a mixed habitat of beach and sand dunes with vegetated cliffs covered in mostly bracken with gorse and small patches of heather. Sometimes this area is incorrectly referred to as Corton Cliffs. Corton Cliffs are further to the north at Corton village. In the autumn, Gunton Cliffs and Warren is a good area for seeing both common and rare migrant birds.
