= West Suffolk District Council elections =

Local government elections in Suffolk, England

Elections of members of West Suffolk Council are held every four years, following the merger of Forest Heath district council and the Borough of St Edmundsbury to form the new West Suffolk district in April 2019. Sixty-four councillors are elected to the chamber, with 34 wards each electing either one, two or three representatives. The first elections to West Suffolk District Council were held on 2 May 2019.

== Council elections ==
Year	Conservative	Labour	Liberal Democrats (Note: Includes totals for the predecessors of the Liberal Democrats, the Liberal Party and SDP (both of which participated in the Alliance).)	Green	WSI (Note: West Suffolk Independents)	Independents & Others	Council control after election
Council established from merger of Forest Heath & St Edmundsbury (64 seats)
2019	36	5	0	1	7	15	Conservative
2023	26	17	1	1	9	10	No overall control

== Results maps ==
2019 results map

2023 results map

== By-election results ==
A by-election occurs when seats become vacant between council elections. Below is a summary of by-elections from 2019 onwards. Full by-election results are listed under the last regular election preceding the by-election and can be found by clicking on the ward name.

=== 2019-present ===
Ward	Date	Incumbent party	Winning party
Newmarket North	30 January 2020	WSI	Conservative
Abbeygate	6 May 2021	Green	Green
Clare, Hundon & Kedington	6 May 2021	Independent	Conservative
Lakenheath	6 May 2021	Independent	Conservative
Moreton Hall	6 May 2021	Independent	Conservative
Southgate	6 May 2021	Conservative	Conservative
Whepstead & Wickhambrook	6 May 2021	Conservative	Conservative
The Rows	30 September 2021	Independent	Conservative
Horringer	25 November 2021	Conservative	Conservative
Newmarket East	11 September 2025	Labour	Reform
Abbeygate	7 May 2026	Conservative	Green
Haverhill West	10 September 2026	Conservative	Conservative
