= William Bliss =

William Bliss may refer to:

- William Blowers Bliss (1795–1874), lawyer, judge and politician in Nova Scotia
- William Dwight Porter Bliss (1856–1926), American religious leader and activist
- William Henry Bliss (1835–1911), English scholar
- William Wallace Smith Bliss (1815–1853), U.S. Army Officer

== See also ==
- William Bliss Baker (1859–1886), American painter
- William Bliss Pine (1877–1942), U.S. Senator
