= Honington, Suffolk =

Village in West Suffolk, England

Coordinates: 52.33619°N 0.80350°E

Honington
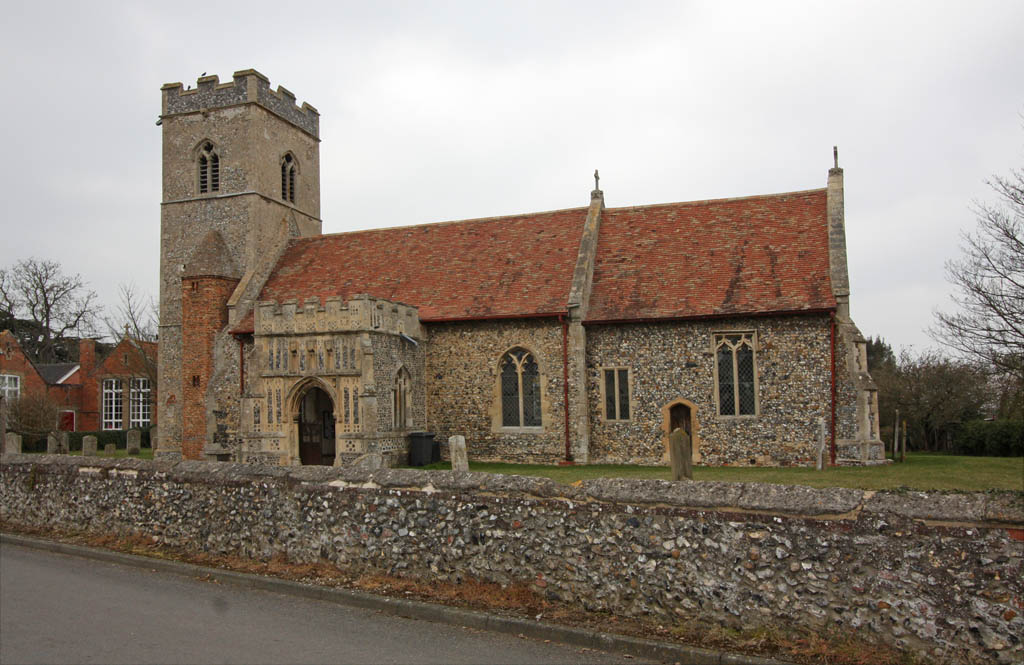

- Location within Suffolk
- Population: 1,247; 1,472 (2011 Census)
- OS grid reference: TL911746
- District: West Suffolk
- Shire county: Suffolk
- Region: East
- Country: England
- Sovereign state: United Kingdom
- Post town: BURY ST EDMUNDS
- Postcode district: IP31
- Dialling code: 01359
- Police: Suffolk
- Fire: Suffolk
- Ambulance: East of England
- UK Parliament: Bury St Edmunds and Stowmarket

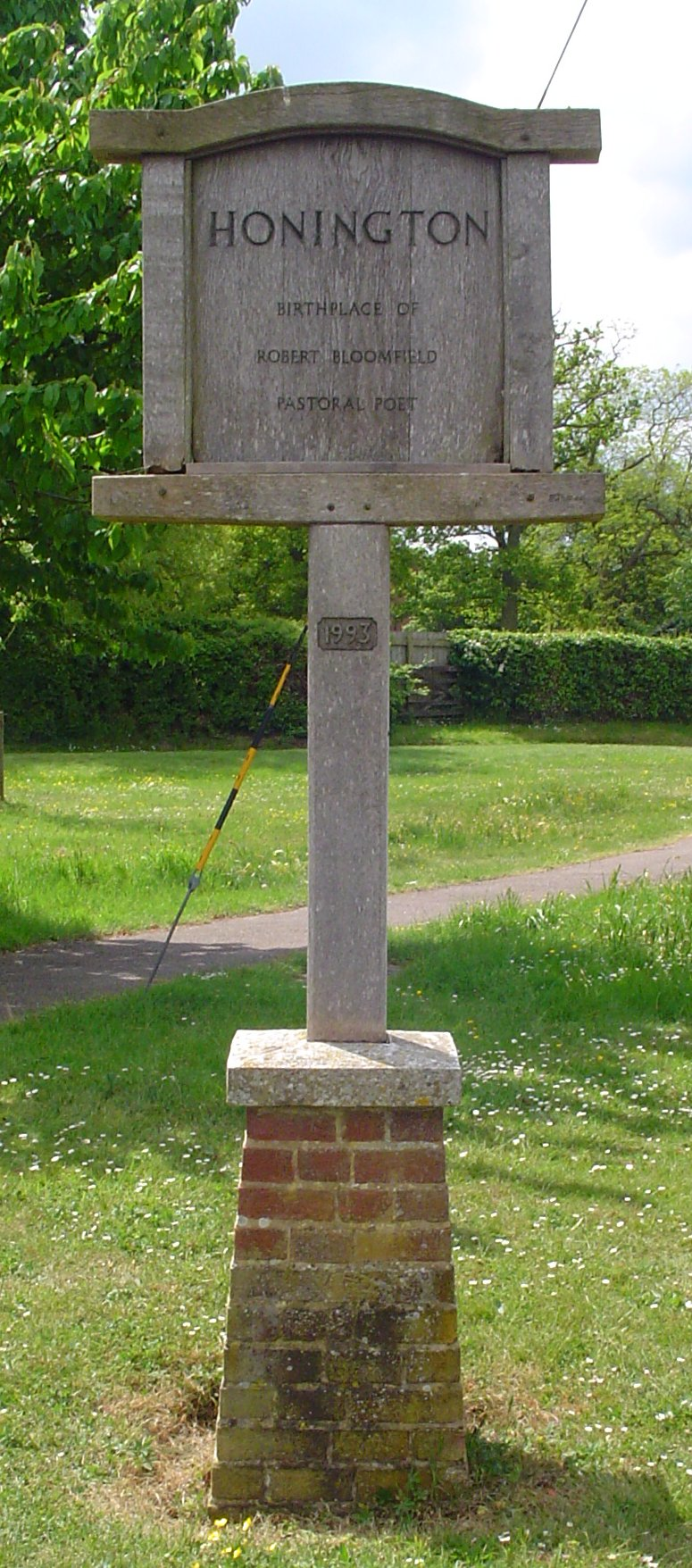
Village sign in Honington

Honington is a village and civil parish located in Bardwell Ward and Pakenham and Troston Wards of West Suffolk District Council, Suffolk in eastern England It is near to the border with Norfolk. It lies on the River Black Bourn, about 8 miles (13 km) from Bury St Edmunds and 6 miles (10 km) from Thetford, Norfolk. Much of the farmland belongs to the estate of the Duke of Grafton. The village is known for its RAF station, RAF Honington. It is also near two joint RAF/USAF airfields: RAF Lakenheath and RAF Mildenhall. Honington was the birthplace of the poet Robert Bloomfield. In 2011 the parish had a population of 1472.

== Position ==
Honington is bordered to the north-east by Sapiston, to the north-west by Fakenham Magna, to the north by Euston, to the east by Bardwell, to the south-west by Troston, and to the south by Ixworth Thorpe.

== History ==
The existence of the village is recorded in the Domesday Book. Before the dissolution of the monasteries under Henry VIII in the late 1530s, the land in the village was held by the abbot of the great monastery at Bury St Edmunds.

The local lords of the manor were the dukes of Grafton in neighbouring Euston. The first Duke of Grafton, previously Earl of Euston, was Henry Fitzroy, the natural son of King Charles II by Countess of Castlemain. The third Duke of Grafton was briefly prime minister. The current Duke of Grafton is the 12th.

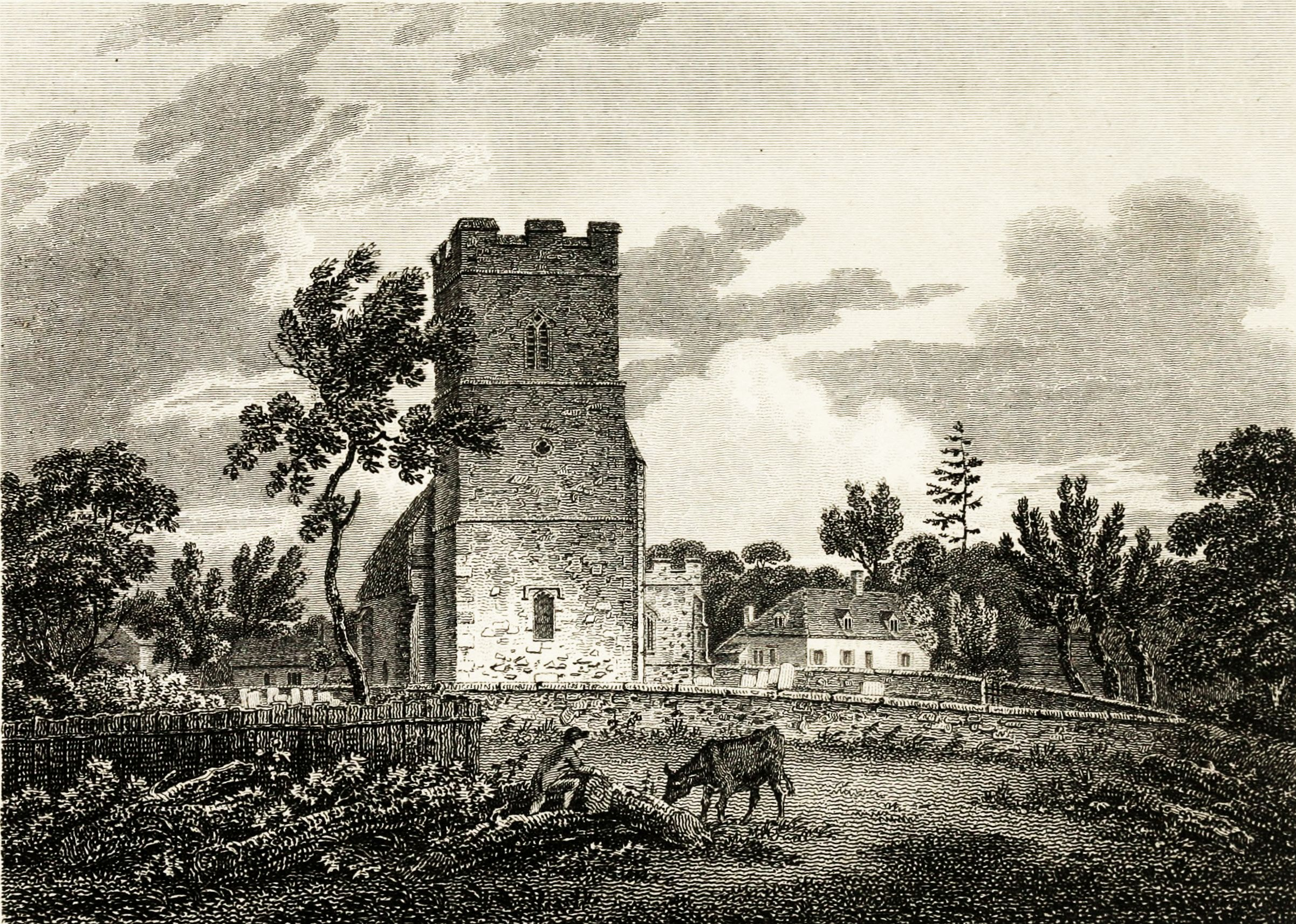
Honington Church and the Bloomfield cottage

The village's past residents include the pastoral poet Robert Bloomfield, born in Honington in 1766. His first and best known poem is "The Farmers Boy". A biography of Bloomfield co-written by William Wickett, the headmaster of the village school at the time, was published in 1969. Bloomfield is buried at Shefford in Bedfordshire, where he spent the latter part of his life.

RAF Honington opened on 3 May 1937, as one of six operational airfields within No 3 Group Bomber Command. "From Barren Rocks to Living Stones" records that Honington was able to play a part in accommodating British evacuees from the terrorism in Aden in 1967. This was a major British operation at the time. In 1994 flying operations stopped and the Honington Air Traffic Control Zone ceased to exist in preparation for Honington becoming the depot of the RAF Regiment. The station now sees only very occasional air traffic. On one occasion in recent years the runway and ground facilities were borrowed by the USAF for a short period while work was carried out on the runway at the nearby RAF Lakenheath.

== Amenities ==
The parishes of Sapiston and Honington were combined in 1972. Although the Grade I listed St Andrew's Church, Sapiston, has been declared redundant, occasional services are still held there. All Saints' Church at Honington is one of eleven congregations in the Ixworth Deanery of the Diocese of St Edmundsbury and Ipswich that make up the Blackbourne Team. The church itself is a Grade I listed building. A Church of England primary school founded in the 19th century operates in the village.

Honington has a public house, the Fox Inn.

== Dad's Army ==
This rural part of Suffolk proved to be an ideal location for the 1970s British TV show Dad's Army. In common with much of the surrounding area, Sapiston and Honington were used for part of the series, in particular the episode "Things That Go Bump in the Night". The outside of the village school appeared as the church hall used for the Home Guard drill hall in a number of episodes.

The TV director, producer and writer David Croft, co-writer of Dad's Army, 'Allo 'Allo!, Are You Being Served?, Hi-de-Hi!, etc., lived at Honington Hall until his death at his Portuguese holiday home on 27 September 2011.

== Notable residents ==
- Robert Bloomfield (1766-1823), labouring-class poet
- William Henry Bliss (1835-1909), scholar and clergyman
- F. P. Raynham (1893-1954), pilot from the early days of aviation
