= Robert Bloomfield =

English labouring-class poet 1766–1823

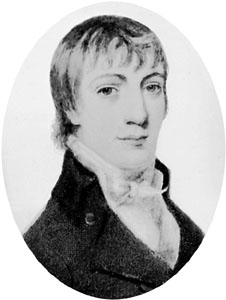
- Born: 3 December 1766; Honington, Suffolk
- Died: 19 August 1823 (aged 56); Shefford, Bedfordshire
- Resting place: Campton
- Occupations: Shoemaker, bookseller
- Writing career
- Genre: Rustic descriptive verse
- Notable works: The Farmer's Boy (1800); Rural Tales, Ballads and Songs (1802)

Robert Bloomfield (3 December 1766 – 19 August 1823) was an English labouring-class poet, whose work is appreciated in the context of other self-educated writers, such as Stephen Duck, Mary Collier and John Clare.

== Life ==
Robert Bloomfield was born into a poor family in the village of Honington, Suffolk. His father was a tailor, who died of smallpox when his son was a year old. It was from his mother Elizabeth, who kept the village school, that he received the rudiments of education.

Bloomfield was apprenticed at the age of eleven to his mother's brother-in-law, and worked on a farm that was part of the estate of the Duke of Grafton, his future patron. Four years later, owing to his small and weak stature (in adulthood just five feet tall), he was sent to London to work as a shoemaker under his elder brother George. One of his early duties was to read the papers aloud while the others in the workshop were working, and he became particularly interested in the poetry section of The London Magazine. He had his first poem, "The Village Girl", published in 1786. When his brother George returned to Suffolk in that year, he set up on his own as a cobbler and in 1790 married Mary Ann Church, by whom he was to have five children.

The poem that made his reputation, The Farmer's Boy, was composed in a garret in Bell Alley, Coleman Street. It was influenced by James Thomson's poem The Seasons. Bloomfield was able to carry in his head some fifty to a hundred finished lines of it at a time, until an opportunity arose to write them down. The manuscript was declined by several publishers and was eventually shown by his brother George to Capel Lofft, a radical Suffolk squire of literary tastes, who arranged for its publication with woodcuts by Thomas Bewick in 1800.

The success of The Farmer's Boy was remarkable, over 25,000 copies being sold in the next two years. It was also reprinted in several American editions, appeared in German translation in Leipzig, in French as Le Valet du Fermier in Paris, and in Italian translation in Milan. There was even a Latin translation of parts of it – De Agricolae Puero, Anglicano Poemate celeberrimo excerptum, et in morem Latini Georgici redditum – made by the lively Suffolk vicar William Clubbe. The poem was particularly admired by the Suffolk-born painter John Constable, who used couplets from it as tags for two of his paintings: "A Ploughing Scene" (shown at the Royal Academy in 1814) and "A Harvest Field, Reapers, Gleaners" (shown at the British Institution in 1817), which he marked as derived from "Bloomfield's poem". It was also admired by Robert Southey, a Romantic poet and future poet laureate.

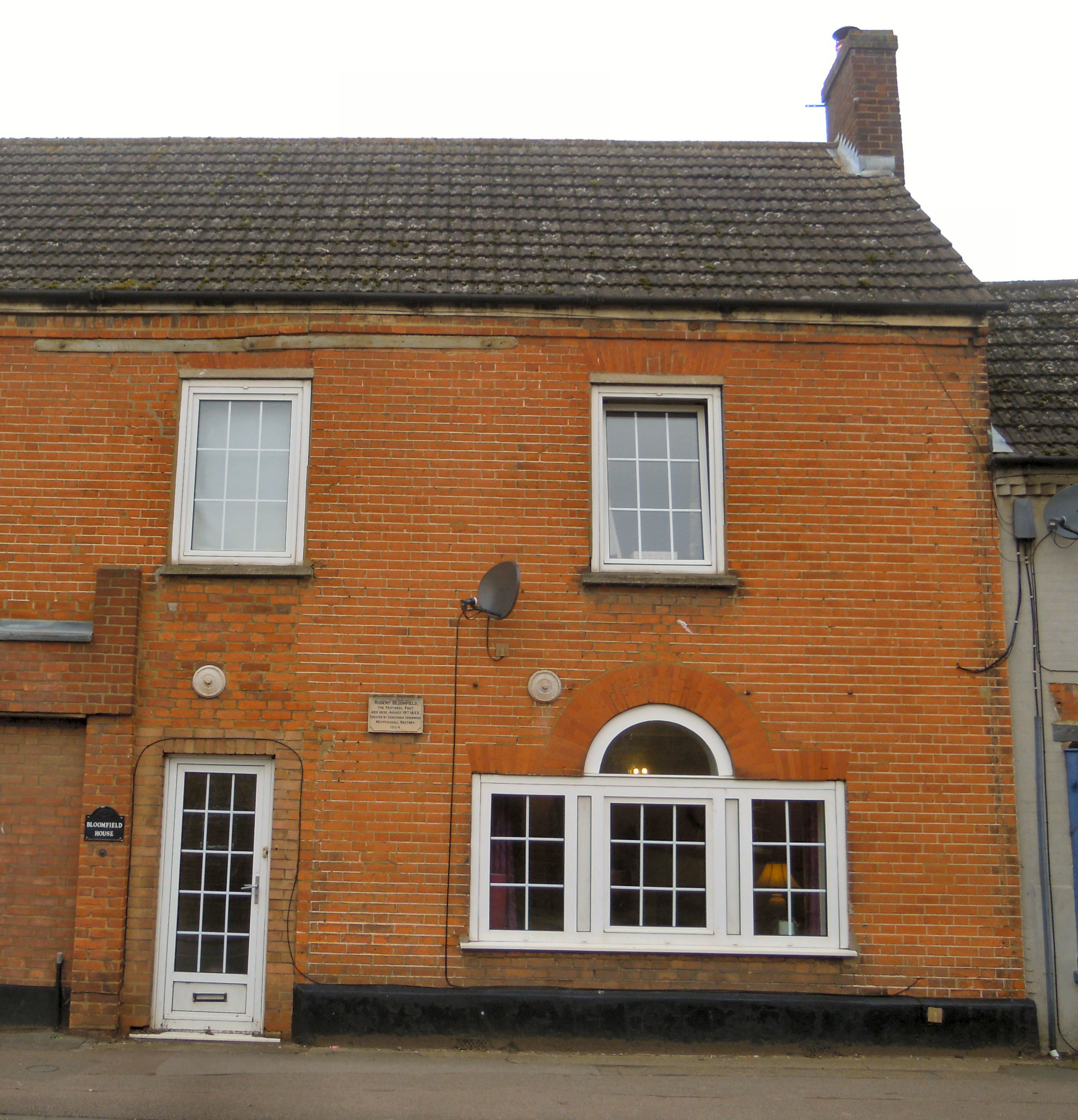
Robert Bloomfield House in Shefford, Bedfordshire, where the poet died in 1823

While this success helped to reduce his poverty for a while, it also took him away from his work. As a result, the Duke of Grafton, who lived at Euston Hall near the village of Bloomfield's birth, settled on him a small annuity of £15 and used influence to gain him employment in the Seal Office to the King's Bench Court and then at Somerset House, although he did not work for long at either. Meanwhile, Bloomfield's reputation was increased by the appearance of his Rural Tales (1802), several poems of which were set to music by his brother Isaac. Another of them, "The Miller's Maid", was turned into an opera in 1804 by John Davy (1763–1824) and formed the basis for a two-act melodrama by John Faucit Saville in 1821. Other publications by Bloomfield included Good Tidings (in praise of inoculation at the instigation of Edward Jenner, 1804); Wild Flowers or Pastoral and Local Poetry (1806); and The Banks of the Wye (a poetic journal of a walking tour taken in the footsteps of Wordsworth, 1811).

Unfortunately Vernor and Hood, his publishers, failed, and in 1812 Bloomfield had to move from London into a cottage rented to him by a friend in the Bedfordshire village of Shefford. There one of his daughters died in 1814 and his wife became insane. To support himself, he tried to carry on a business as a bookseller but it failed, and in his later years he was reduced to making Aeolian harps, which he sold among his friends. With failing eyesight and his own reason threatened by depression, he died in great poverty on 19 August 1823. His collection of books and manuscripts, and his household effects, had to be auctioned to pay his debts and cover the funeral expenses. To assist in that fund-raising came the publication in that year of his drama, Hazlewood Hall, and in the following year of The Remains of Robert Bloomfield, which included writing for children, on which he had been working for some years, and a selection of his correspondence.

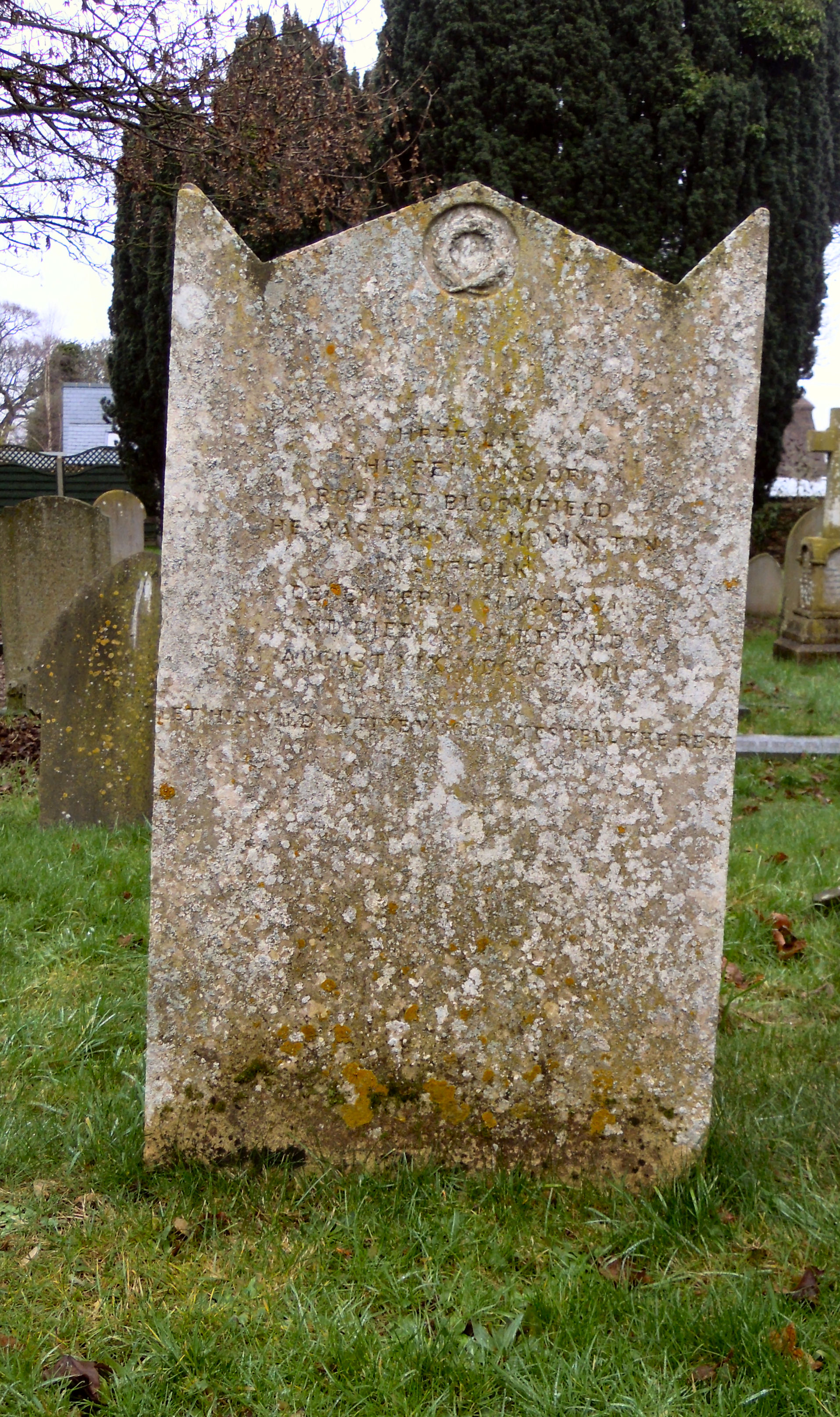
Bloomfield's grave in the churchyard of All Saints church in Campton in Bedfordshire

Robert Bloomfield is buried in the churchyard of the Church of All Saints in nearby Campton, Bedfordshire.

== Poetry ==
Bloomfield's poetry invites comparison with that of George Crabbe, who was also a native of Suffolk. Both wrote much in couplets of iambic pentameters, and both provide descriptions of rural life at its hardest and least inviting. Bloomfield, however, is more cheerful in tone and his verse is denser and more vigorous. Here, for instance, is the episode in "The Farmer's Boy" where Giles chops up turnips to feed to the livestock in winter:

On GILES, and such as Giles, the labour falls,
To strew the frequent load where hunger calls.
On driving gales sharp hail indignant flies,
And sleet, more irksome still, assails his eyes;
Snow clogs his feet; or if no snow is seen,
The field with all its juicy store to screen,
Deep goes the frost, till every root is found
A rolling mass of ice upon the ground.
No tender ewe can break her nightly fast,
Nor heifer strong begin the cold repast,
Till Giles with pond'rous beetle foremost go,
And scatt'ring splinters fly at every blow;
When pressing round him, eager for the prize,
From their mixt breath warm exhalations rise.

However, such verse varies little from the work of many of Bloomfield's contemporaries, such as James Montgomery and Ebenezer Elliot, whose names, like his, were well known in their time but are scarcely remembered now. Besides such formal productions, he told many light-hearted stories in octosyllabics, some of which are incidentally interesting for their employment of Suffolk dialect words, particularly in "The Horkey". His work served as an inspiration to John Clare, who began publishing his own rural poetry in 1820 and praised Bloomfield's highly.

Robert's brother, Nathaniel, also published a collection of poetry in 1803, An Essay on War, in Blank Verse, and Other Poems. Byron commented on the brothers in English Bards and Scotch Reviewers (lines 775–786), linking Robert's name favourably with other poets of humble beginnings such as Burns and Gifford, but dismissing Nathaniel's writing as routine and uninspired. Byron returned to the charge in Hints from Horace with the apostrophe:

Hark to those lines, narcotically soft,
The cobbler-laureats sing to Capel Lofft! (lines 733–734)

Although a note makes it clear that Nathaniel is his principal target, he also seems to include his "brother Bobby" in the accusation that Lofft "has spoiled some excellent shoemakers and been accessory to the poetic undoing of many of the industrious poor."

== Later reputation ==
The Robert Bloomfield Masonic lodge No 8328 was founded in 1971 at Biggleswade Masonic Centre, where it continues to meet. Shefford's secondary school, later a middle school (for pupils aged 9–13), was named after the poet. In 2000 the Robert Bloomfield Society was founded to promote awareness of his life and work and has encouraged scholarly publications relating to him. A revised and enlarged selection of his poems was published by Trent Editions in 2007. Recent studies see his poetry in its social as well as its literary context.
