= Bardwell Ward =

Electoral ward in West Suffolk, England

Bardwell
- ward West Suffolk District Council
- Local government in East of England: Suffolk

Current ward
- Created: 2019
- Councillor: Andrew Smith (Conservative)

Bardwell Ward is one of a number of West Suffolk District wards created to come into force following the 2019 local elections held on 2 May 2019. This was part of the 2019–2023 structural changes to local government in England.

In 2018/19 it had a population of 2,703 persons living in 1,143 dwellings. According to 2011 statistics, about 65% of these dwellings were owner-occupied.

The Ward comprises

- Bardwell parish
- Barnham parish
- Coney Weston parish
- Euston parish
- Fakenham Magna parish
- Sapiston parish
- part of Honington parish
