= Campton and Chicksands =

Coordinates: 52.028°N 0.355°W

- Civil parish
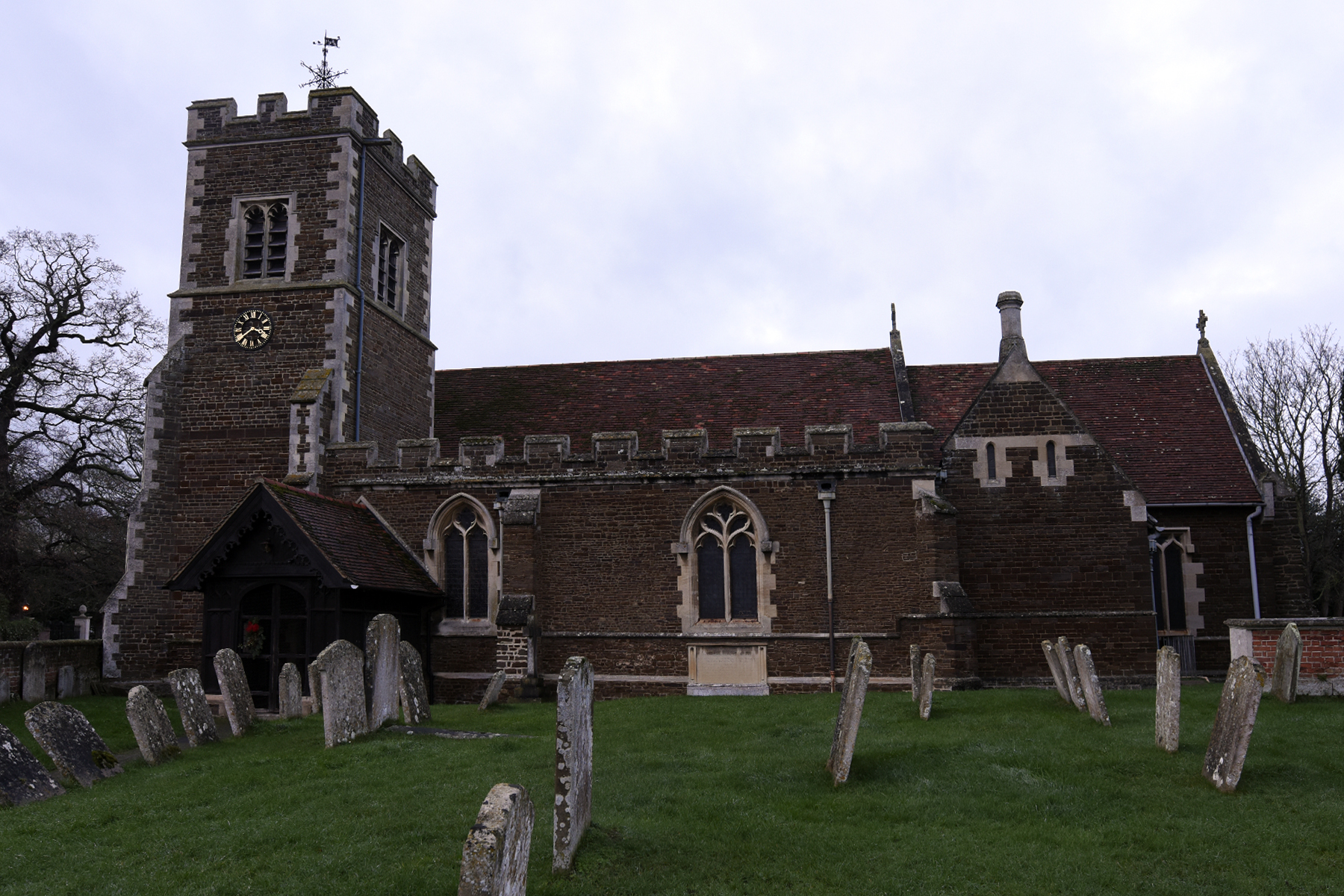
- Church of All Saints, Campton

- Location within Bedfordshire
- Population: 1,895 (Parish, 2021)
- Civil parish: Campton and Chicksands
- Unitary authority: Central Bedfordshire
- Ceremonial county: Bedfordshire
- Region: East
- Country: England
- Sovereign state: United Kingdom

Campton and Chicksands is a civil parish in the Central Bedfordshire district of Bedfordshire, England. Its main settlements are Campton and Chicksands. At the 2021 census the parish had a population of 1,895.

== History ==
The parish was created in 1985 as a merger of the two former civil parishes of Chicksands and Campton.

== Governance ==
There are two tiers of local government covering Campton and Chicksands, at parish and unitary authority level: Campton and Chicksands Parish Council and Central Bedfordshire Council. The parish council generally meets at Campton Village Hall on Gravenhurst Road. Central Bedfordshire Council also has its headquarters in the parish, at Priory House on Monks Walk in Chicksands.
