= Horkey =

Harvest custom in England and Ireland

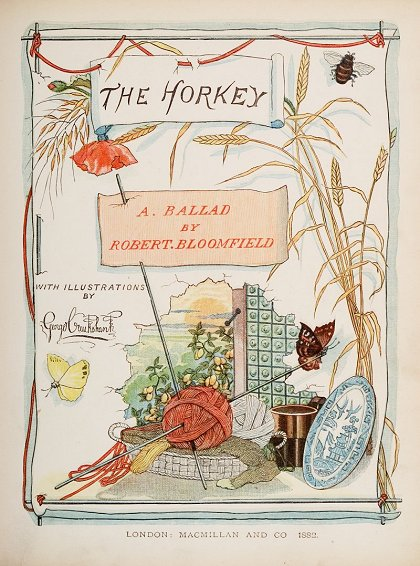
Robert Bloomfield’s The Horkey, illustrated by George Cruikshank, 1882

The name horkey was applied to end of harvest customs and celebrations, especially in the Eastern Counties of England, although the word occurred elsewhere in England and also Ireland. Since it is found in dialect, there is no standard spelling and other versions include hawkie and hockey. Mentioned from the 16th century onward, the custom became less common during the course of the 19th century and was more or less extinct in the 20th. It is chiefly remembered now because of the poem dedicated to it by Robert Bloomfield in 1802.

== The harvest-home ==
In the introduction to The Horkey, Robert Bloomfield sets the scene the poem goes on to describe: "In Suffolk husbandry, the man who goes foremost through the harvest with the scythe or the sickle is honoured with the title of 'Lord', and at the Horkey, or harvest home-feast, collects what he can for himself or brethren, from the farmers and visitors, to make a 'frolic' afterwards, called the 'largess spending'." Leaving the hall after the feast, they then shout "largess" so loudly that it is heard in all the farms around.

A later account of Cambridgeshire celebrations mentions that, "as the wagon rolled along the street, the locals would pelt it with buckets of water. This was a sign that, since harvest was now over, it didn't matter if it rained. Then came the meal itself: mountains of roast beef, vegetables and plum puddings - washed down with locally brewed strong ale. All paid for by the farmer. In some Cambridgeshire villages, the revelers performed a dance in which they wore stiff straw hats on which they balanced tankards of ale." Among additional details in The English Dialect Dictionary, it is mentioned that the last load of the harvest was brought in decked with festive boughs or decorated with a corn dolly woven of stalks. Accompanying it came a procession of farm labourers 'crying the mare' with the song

We hev her! We hev her! A koo in a tether;
At oor toon end, a yow and a lamb;

A pot an' a pan;

May we get seaf in wiv oor harvest yam;

Wiv a sap o' good yal

A' some haupence ti spend.

John Greaves Nall's Glossary of East Anglian Dialect, originally published in 1866, conjectured that the word 'horkey' referred to the hallooing that followed the feast and was connected with the Norse hauka, to shout, that is also found in the words 'hawker' and 'huckster'.

== Literary references ==
References to the term connected with harvest customs seem to emerge in the 16th century. Archbishop Parker's rhyming translation of Psalm 126, published in 1560, ends with the reassurance that

Who goeth from home all heavily,
Wyth his seede leape his land to try,
He home returnes wyth hocky cry,
Wyth sheaves full lade abundantly.

Further literary evidence points to a number of customs established around the final gathering of the harvest at this period. They include the reapers accompanying a fully laden cart; a tradition of shouting "Hooky, hooky"; and one of the foremost reapers acting as 'lord' of the harvest and asking for money from onlookers. Several of these features appear in Thomas Nashe's play Summer's Last Will and Testament, which seems to have been first performed in 1592. There a character personifying Harvest refers to himself as the "master" of the reapers accompanying him and goes begging the audience for a "largesse". In addition the reapers sing a nonsense song similar in form to the Essex song quoted in the dialect dictionary. Its second stanza, repeated throughout the scene, contains the call "Hooky, Hooky", on which the text's Victorian editor commented that the refrain "is still heard in some parts of the kingdom, with this variation,

Hooky, hooky, we have shorn,
And bound what we did reap,
And we have brought the harvest home,
To make bread good and cheap."

Near the start of the following century, Sir Thomas Overbury invoked the custom while describing the honest yeoman who "thinks not the bones of the dead anything bruised or the worse for it, though the country lasses dance in the church-yard after evensong. Rock-Monday, and the wake in summer shrovings, the wakeful catches on Christmas eve, the hoky or seed-cake, these he yearly keeps, yet holds them no relics of Popery." The final item refers to the sweet foods, and later puddings, served at the harvest feast. A cake of a richer kind was later mentioned in a couplet from Poor Robin's Almanack for 1676, a publication originally associated with Saffron Walden: "Hoacky is brought home with hallowing, /Boys with plum-cake the cart following." Similar harvest customs in mid-17th century Devon are described in Robert Herrick's poem "The Hock-Cart, or Harvest Home".

It was Bloomfield’s poem which established these particular customs in the national consciousness, although they were in fact only a regional variant of harvest celebrations common across Europe. Bloomfield put his account of the feast in the mouth of an old family friend as a remembrance of life in the middle of the 18th century. A correspondent in the New Monthly Magazine, describing a similar festivity he attended at a farm near Bury St Edmunds in 1820, appealed to Bloomfield's poem as his touchstone. During its course, he quoted one stanza of a song in praise of the givers of the feast which still survives elsewhere in the Cambridgeshire village of Whittlesford. Another poetical reference to the Horkey was included in John Player's Home or The Months, a poem of domestic life (1838). The author noted that his description was from his native Saffron Walden; it differs from Bloomfield's in the detail that the "largess" call follows the payment of wages on the day after the feast.

== Late survivals ==
Bloomfield noted in his introduction that "these customs are going fast out of use". In the illustrations provided by George Cruikshank for the children's edition of 1882, those at the feast are dressed in the fashion of a bygone time. The scene is distanced, much as the poet himself presents it, as a piece of folklore. But there were still survivals of the custom, and even revivals, as evidenced by news items from 1901 to 1902 that speak of "old-time horkeys" in the village of Foxearth.

By 1934, the artist Thomas Hennell was commenting that "since the passing of the Agricultural Wages Bill, the Horkey has been generally abandoned, though one or two landowners in the eastern counties are still generous enough to give a supper each year". There was, nevertheless, one revival at the end of the 20th century by the Morris Men of the Suffolk village of Glemsford.
