= Church of All Saints, Campton =

Anglican church in Bedfordshire, England

Coordinates: 52°01′46.1″N 0°21′16.1″W

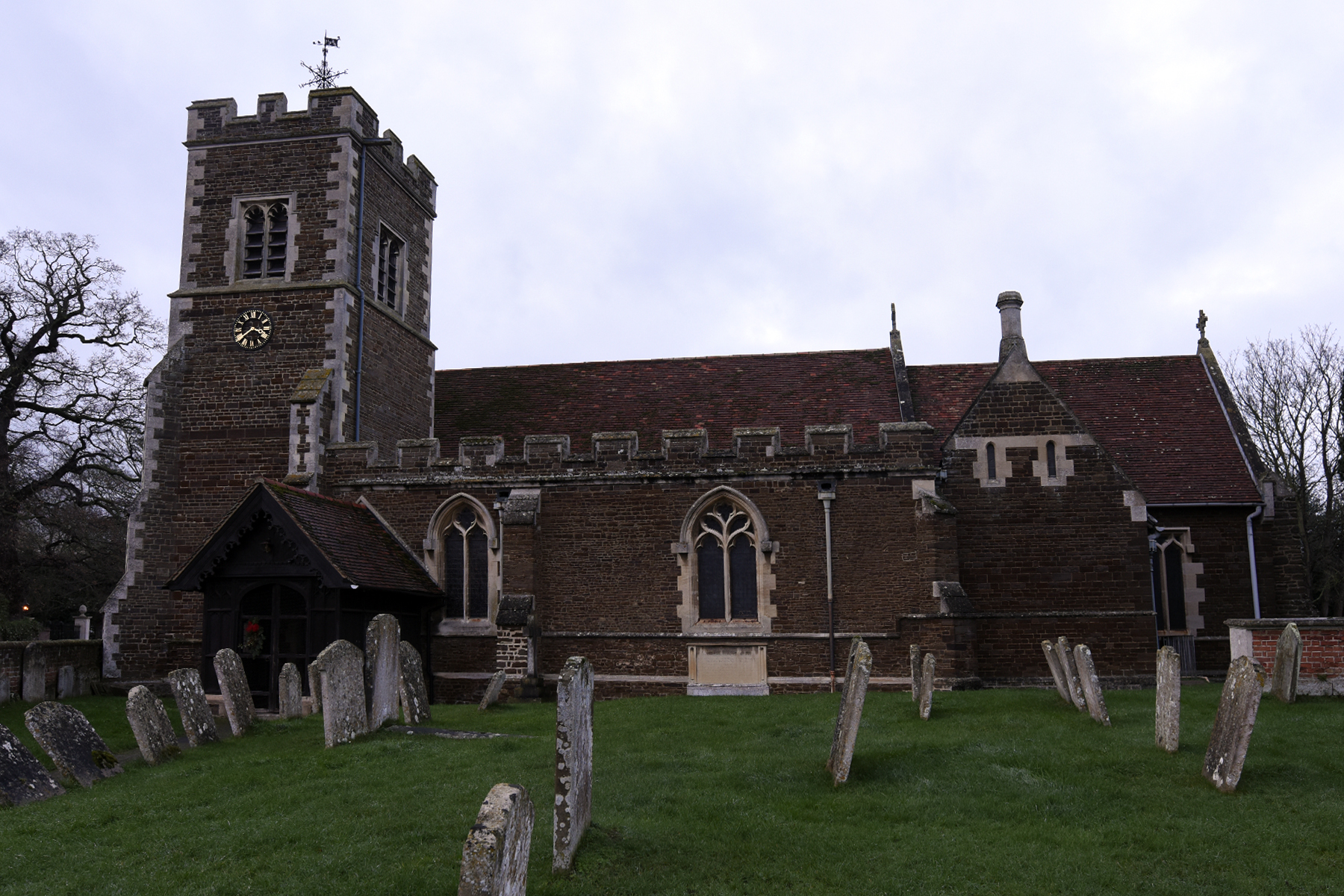
- Campton All Saints Church
- Church of All Saints, Campton
- Country: England
- Denomination: Church of England

History
- Status: Parish church

Architecture
- Functional status: Active

Administration
- Diocese: St Albans
- Archdeaconry: Bedford
- Deanery: Ampthill & Shefford
- Parish: Campton

Clergy
- Vicar: Reverend Dean Henley

The Church of All Saints is the Anglican parish church in the village of Campton, Shefford, Bedfordshire, England. Its official title is Campton and Chicksands Parish and encompasses the villages of Campton and Chicksands and the nearby military base, despite the base having its own church dedicated to Saint Gilbert of Sempringham. The military church is a non-denominational church, so it is not a part of the Anglican parish.

The building has been Grade II* listed since 1966.

== History ==
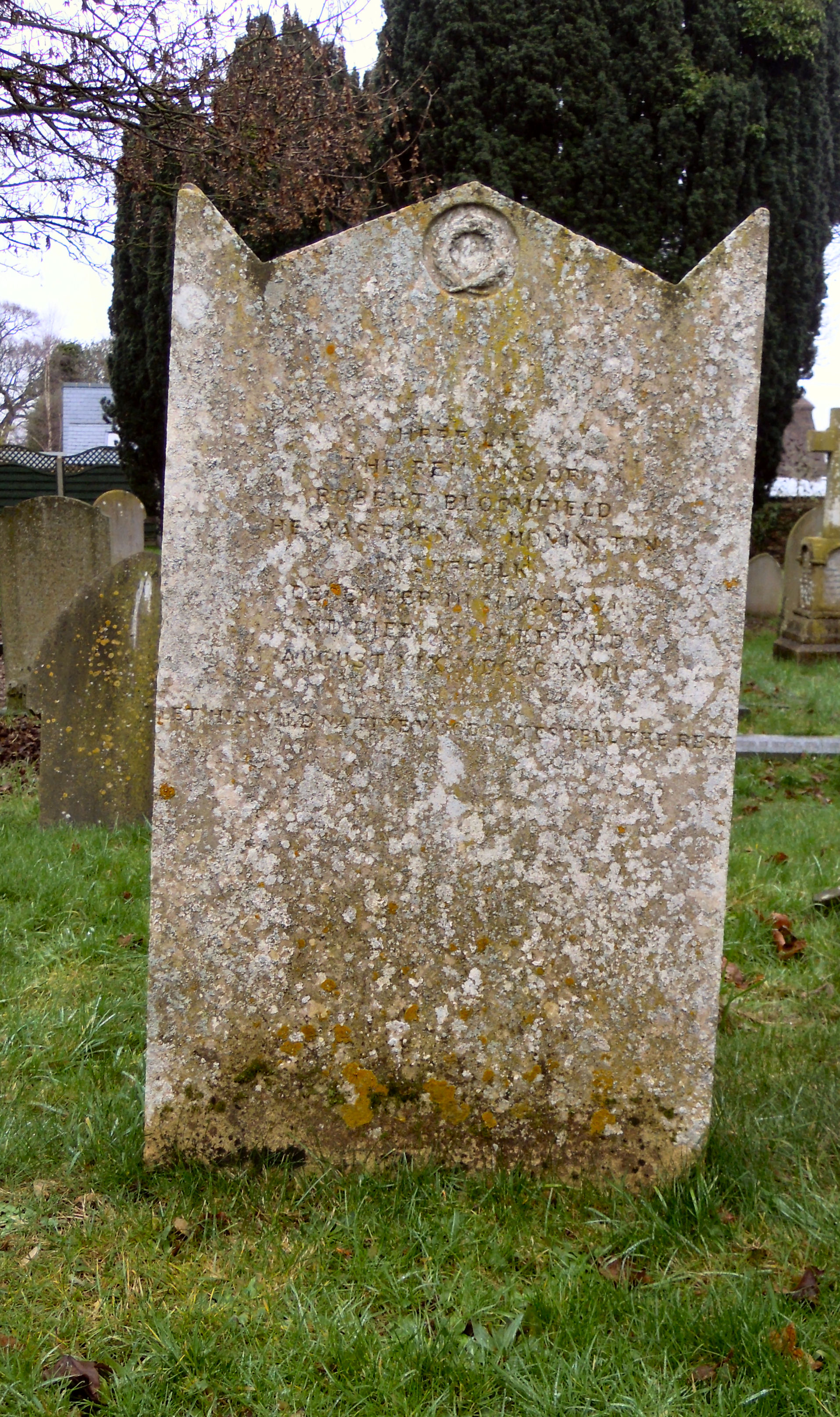
The grave of poet Robert Bloomfield in the churchyard

The church dates back to the 13th Century and was originally constructed from red sandstone hewn blocks. It has been added to and rebuilt many times over the last eight centuries, including the addition of the Osborn Mausoleum in 1649 and the Osborn Chapel in the same year (which forms the northern part of the church). Several of the Osborn crests and mottoes adorn the church which in Latin is 'Quantum in Rebus Inane,' and translates as 'What vanity in human affairs.'

The tower is 43 feet (13 m) high and 10 feet (3 m) wide and was added in the 15th century replacing part of the south aisle. The church was renovated in the late 19th century with the tower being rebuilt from well cut sandstone blocks. At this time the organ was installed and was believed to have been from Chicksands Priory.

Robert Bloomfield (1766 - 1823), the pastoral poet, is buried in the churchyard. Although he lived and died in Shefford, he is interred in Campton as the church in Shefford, was a Chapel of Ease (essentially a sub-church of All Saints as Parish church) and as such had no burial ground. The church at Shefford remained in the Campton parish up until 1903, when it gained a separate parish for itself. The first register for the church was started in 1568 and includes records for Campton-Cum-Shefford (as the Parish was known) up until 1812 when Shefford's own register was started. The Campton-Cum-Shefford parish registers are notable for events in the 18th century including two people who were ex-communicated for fornication.

The graveyard also contains one Commonwealth War Grave from the First World War.

== Rectors and vicars of the parish ==
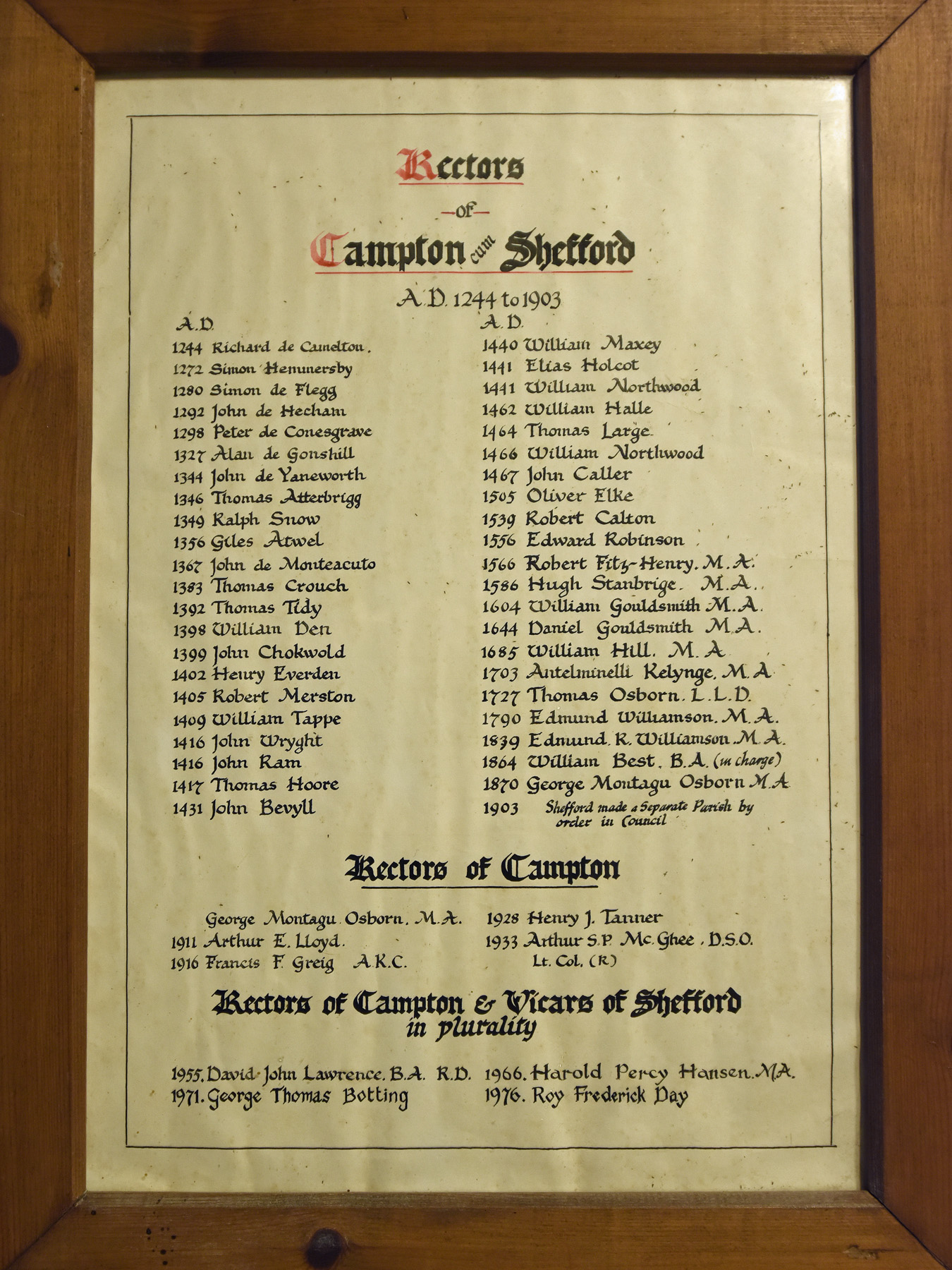
List of rectors of All Saints Church Campton

The parish records note that there has been a rector officiating in the church since at least 1215. The history of the parish also has links into other parishes and certain redrawing of the boundaries. The church became a de facto head church when it was held in plurality with other parishes (IE when a rector officiates in two parishes). This has happened twice in the history of All Saints; between 1955 and 1976 when it was held in plurality with Shefford and from 1976 to 1982 when it was held in plurality with Meppershall and Stondon.

The names given below are from the List of Campton Rectors held by Central Bedfordshire Council. There is a parchment sheet with a list of rectors displayed inside the church (see image). This list differs with spellings and dates and where anomalies exist, they are annotated. The current incumbent is the Reverend Dean Henley who acceded in 2006.

Year	Name	Year	Name	Year	Name	Year	Name
1215	William	1402	Henry Everedon (Note: Listed on the parchment hanging in the church as Henry Everden)	1552	Edward Robinson	1911	Arthur E Lloyd
1244	Richard de Camelton	1405	Robert Merston	1566	Robert Fitzhenry	1916	Francis Fairchild Greig
1273	Simon de Hemmesby (Note: Listed on the parchment hanging in the church as Simon Hemmersby)	1409	William Tappe	1586	Hugh Stanbridge	1928	Henry James Tanner
1280	Simon de Fegg (Note: Listed on the parchment hanging in the church, but only referred to on his death in the citation given)	1416	John Wryght	1604	William Gouldsmith	1933	Arthur Sydney P McGhee
1292	John de Hecham	1416	John Ram	1644	Daniel Gouldsmith	1955	David John Lawrence
1298	Peter de Conesgrave	1417	Thomas Thorne (Note: Listed on the parchment hanging in the church as Thomas Hoore)	1686	William Hill	1966	Harold Percy Hansen
1327	Alan de Gonshill	1431	John Bevyll	1703	Antelminelli Kelynge	1971	George Thomas Botting
1344	John De Ganeworth (Note: Listed on the parchment hanging in the church as John de Yaneworth)	1440	William Maxey	1709	Richard Finch	1976	Roy Frederick Day
1346	Thomas Atterbrigg	1441	Elias Holcott	1711	John Keye	1982	Gordon Hamilton Waller
1349	Ralph Snow	1441	William Northwold	1716	Matthew Hanscombe	1987	William David B Williams
1350	Giles atte Well (Note: Listed on the parchment hanging in the church as Giles Atwel)	1462	William Halle	1727	Thomas Osborn	1991	John Henry Barrall
1367	John De Monte Acuto (Note: Listed on the parchment hanging in the church as John de Monteacuto)	1464	Thomas Large	1748	Jacob Janeway	1999	David W Renshaw
1383	Thomas Crouch	1466	William Northwold	1790	Edmond Williamson	2002	Margaret Joy Venables
1392	Thomas Tydy	1467	John Caller	1839	Edmond Riland Williamson	2006	Dean Henley
1398	William Den	1505	Oliver Elke	1864	William Best		
1400	John Chokwold	1539	Robert Catton	1870	George Montague Osborn		

== The bells and the bell-ringers ==
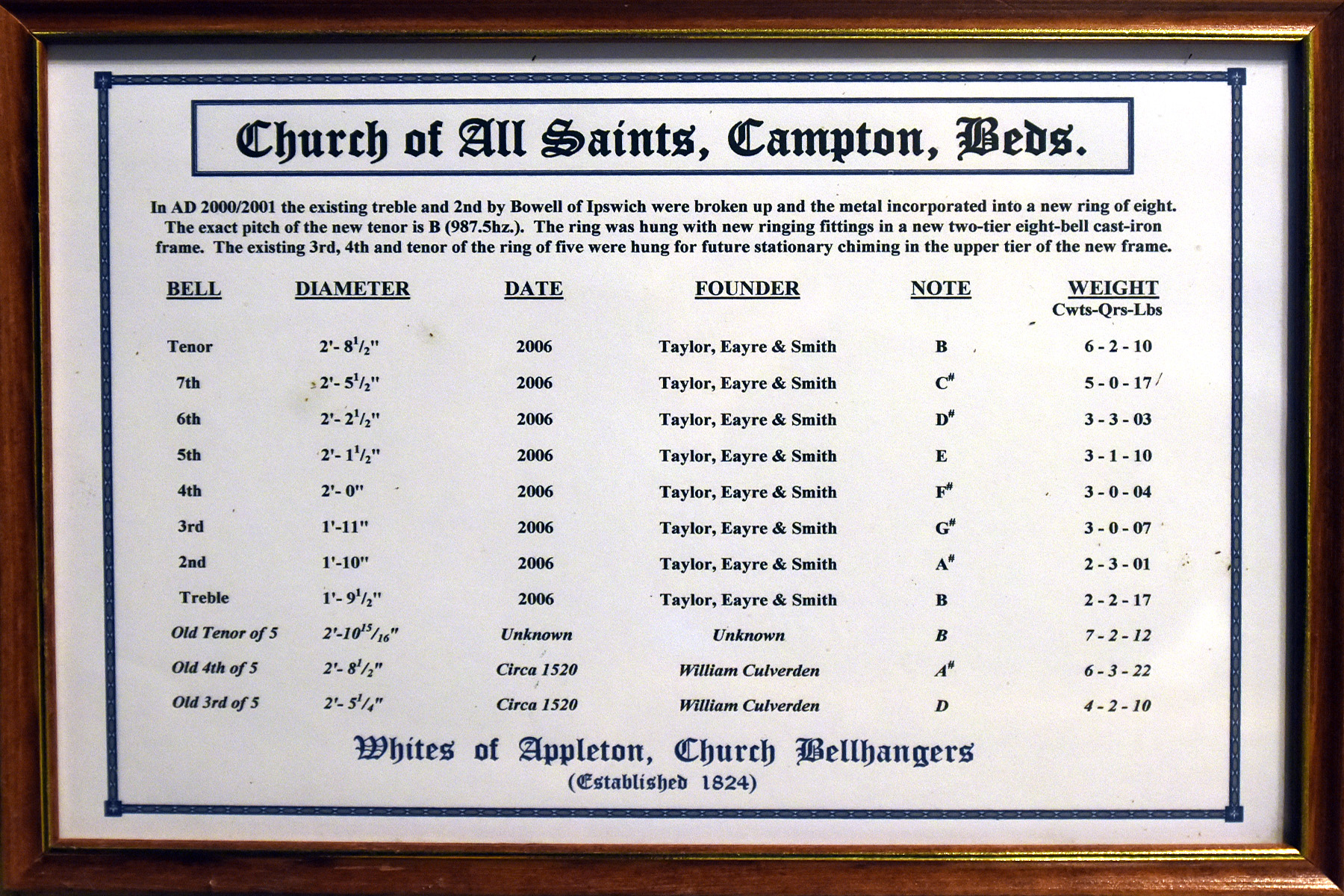
List detailing the bells of All Saints Church Campton

The notice in the church (see image) lists 11 bells in the tower, two of which were cast in 1520 by William Culverden. Eight new bells were cast for the tower in 2006 by John Taylor & Co of Loughborough. The bells were hung alongside the existing three bells and dedicated on the 1 July 2007 being blessed in a special ceremony by the Bishop of Bedford.

The Campton Bell-Ringers peal out the bells for Sunday morning services and the bells are used in bell ringing competitions.

== Church Interior ==
The church has many notable features; two piscinas (one by the altar and one in the south chapel), alcoves for effigy display and plaques and markers detailing remembrances for the dead. There are seven plaques and windows dedicated to members of the Osborn family of Chicksands Priory commemorating their dead, but the oldest plaque dates back to 1489 and remembers Richard Carlyll and his wife Joan, both of whom died on 14 February 1489. No explanation is given for why they both died on the same day.

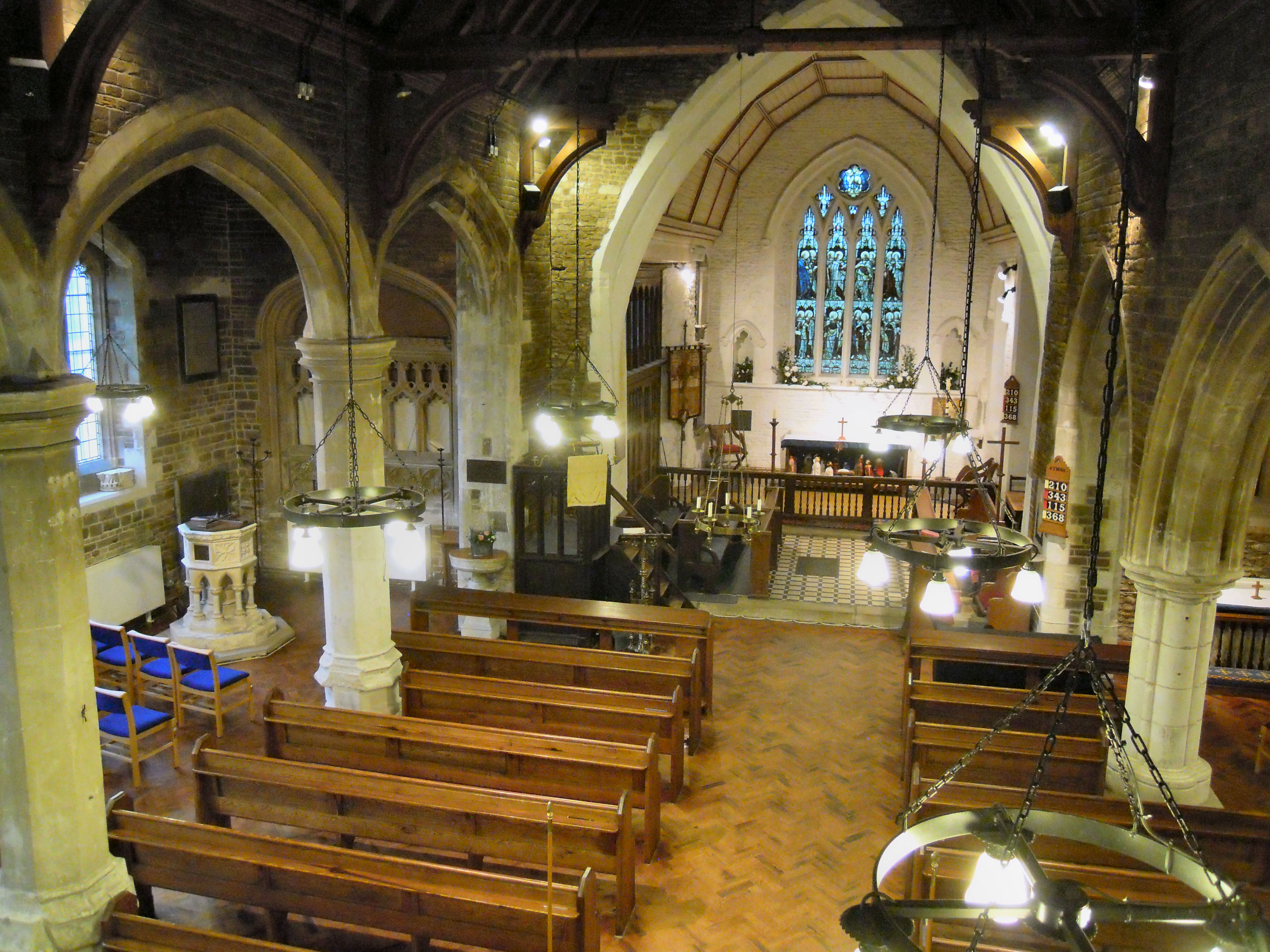
The nave

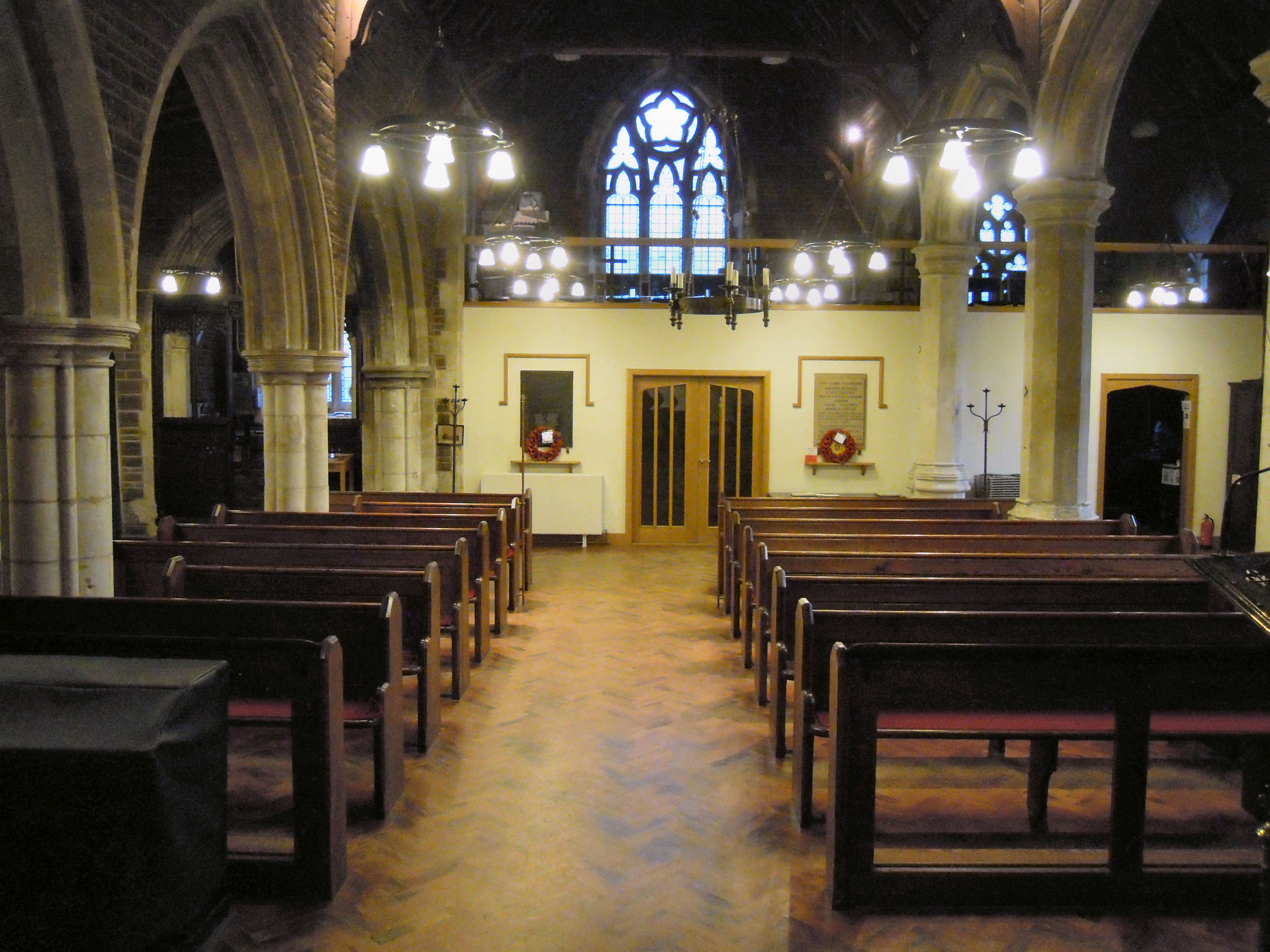
The gallery

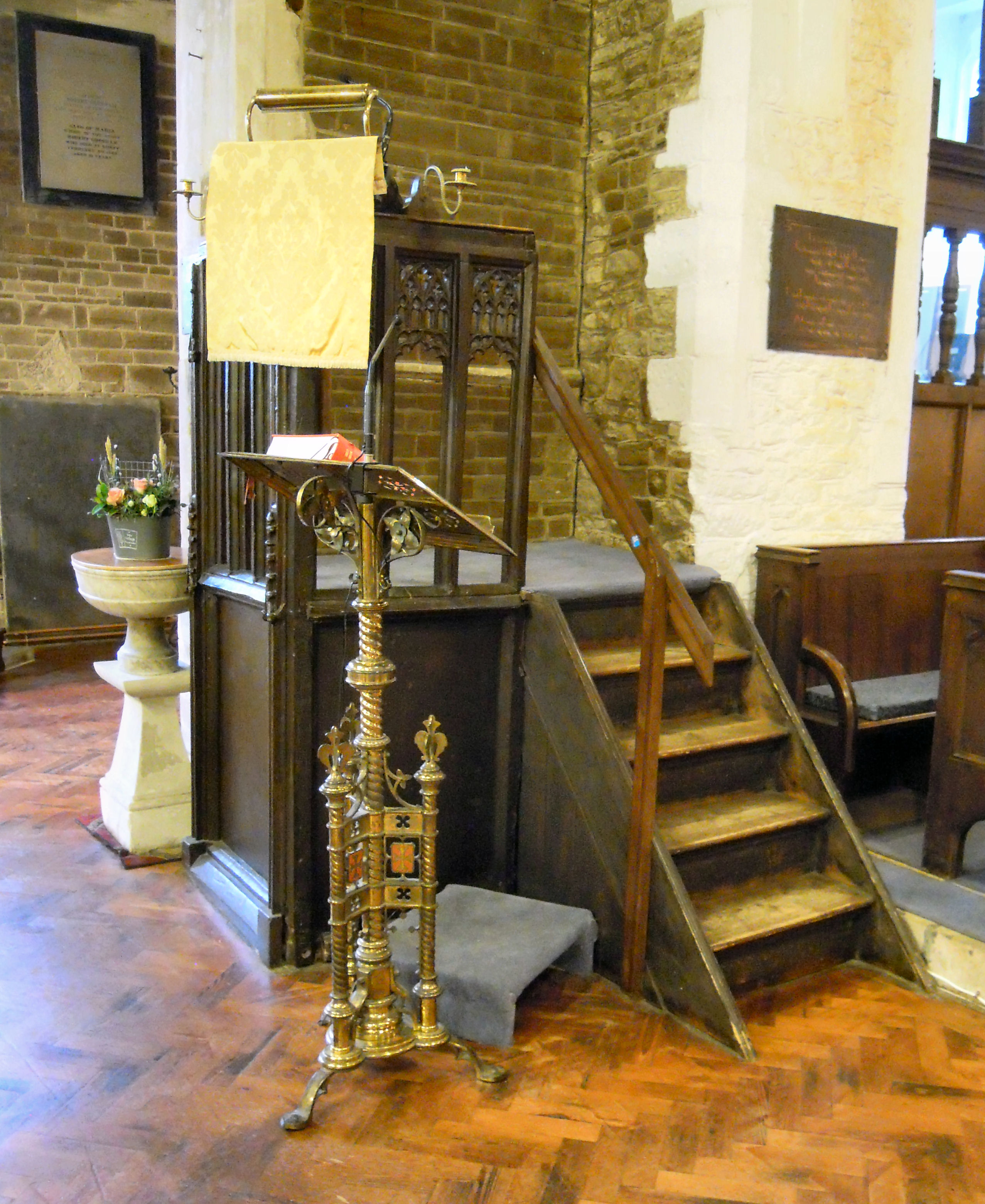
The lectern and pulpit

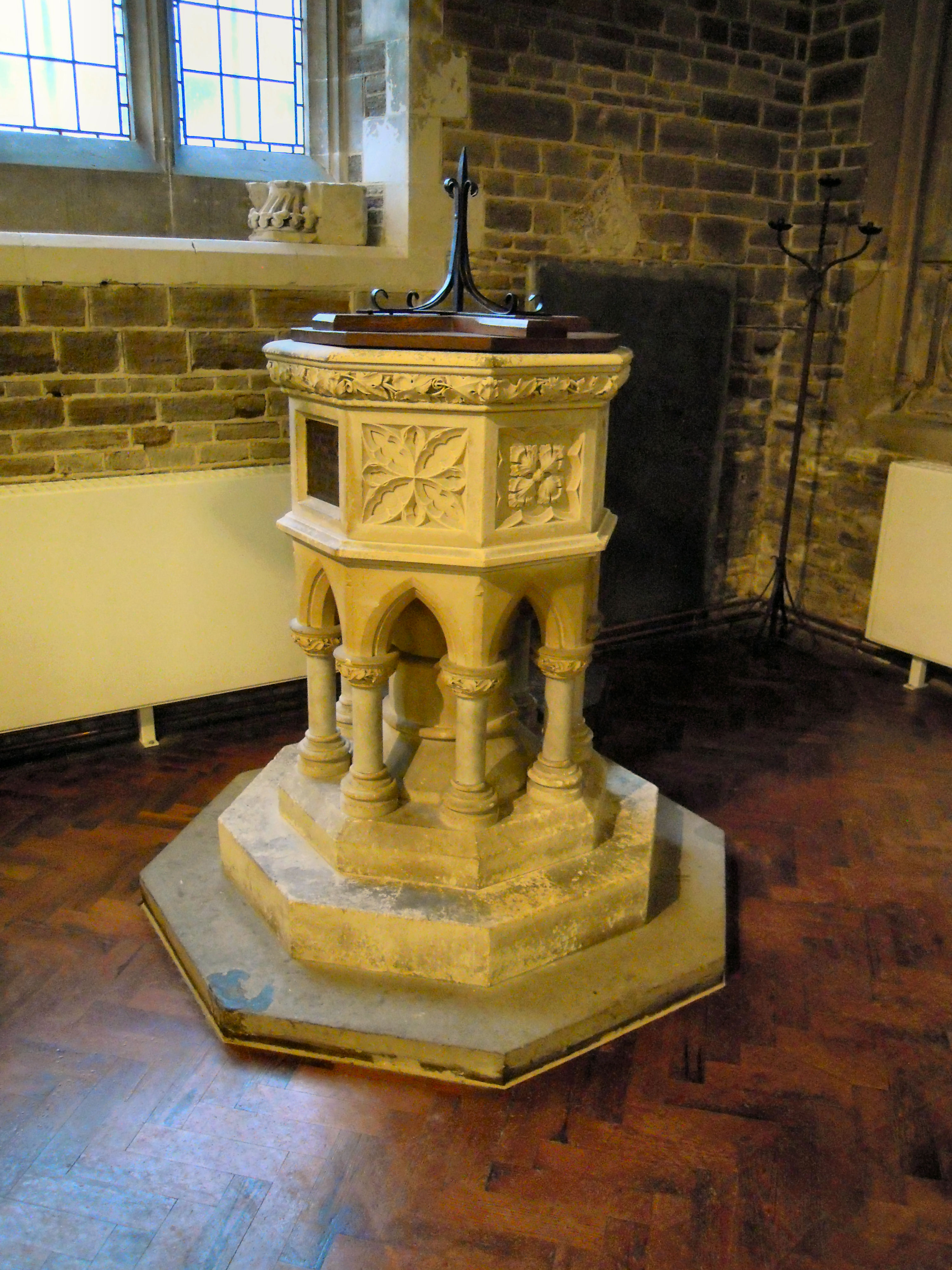
The baptismal font

Some of the stained glass windows are dedicated to the dead and others (such as the east window) depict 16 saints and the Lamb of God with a Banner of Victory at the top. The window at the south wall of the chancel depicts the Christian virtues Faith, Hope and Charity. The glass lights, designed by Heaton, Butler and Bayne were made by the Chance Brothers of Oldbury and were dedicated in 1912. The windows in the south wall, like the east windows, are by Heaton, Butler and Bayne. The west end of the church is dominated by the gallery, which was designed and constructed by Peter Farmer in 2002. Beneath this is the Fred Oakley Room, a Campton resident and benefactor of the church who died in 2000. The two war memorials on either side of the entrance to the Oakley Room commemorate the men of Campton who gave their lives in World War I and World War II. These memorials were originally sited at each side of the North door. The oak screens that form the east and north sides of the ringing chamber are 15th century and were formerly part of the chancel screen.

The north wall dates from 1649 and a number of architectural fragments, believed to be from Chicksands Priory, have been incorporated in this and other walls in the church. The monuments set in the wall are dedicated to Sir Danvers Osborn and the Rev. Arthur McGee, the last Rector resident in the village. The ornate baptismal font was installed c. 1893 and commemorates the Hon. Charlotte Osborn. The Gothic-style lectern is late 19th century while the pulpit is constructed from parts of a 14th-century screen which includes a traceried panel.

The two-tiered glazed screen that separates the chancel from the Osborn Chapel is dated 1649. The communion rail is 18th century. The church used to have a Jacobean screen across the front of the Chancel. The screen dated back to 1670, but was destroyed in a fire in May 1960 when a sulphur candle used to remove bees in the church had been left unattended. The altar is framed by a two-centred chancel arch with male head-stops; the head-stops on the north (left) niche wear a style of soft cap that was popular in about 1500, while those on the south (right) are bareheaded. The organ possibly originated in Chicksands Priory and was installed in its purpose-built chamber in 1894.

The Osborn Chapel contains monuments to members of the Osborn Family including two large white marble altars on the north side with carved oval armorial cartouches with hanging fabric and garlands between. These memorials by John Stone (1620-1667), the son of Robert Stone, are superb examples of 17th century church monumental sculptures. Amongst those commemorated are Sir Peter Osborn (died 1653), who was Governor of Guernsey when its castle was besieged by the Puritan navy; and John Osborn who, after a distinguished diplomatic career died at Rudolstadt in Saxony in 1814 on the eve of his return to England after eight years as a captive under Napoleon Bonaparte.

The church has numerous examples of early graffiti. The restoration of the church in 1895 sympathetically used as much stone as possible from the original building, although it was not always possible for it to be repositioned in the right place. As a result, graffiti appears in wall spaces where they would not normally be expected. There are good examples in the ringing chamber, the Oakley Room and in the gallery.

The Welsh stone memorial to the pastoral poet Robert Bloomfield was installed in 2003; he is buried in the churchyard.

== Gallery ==
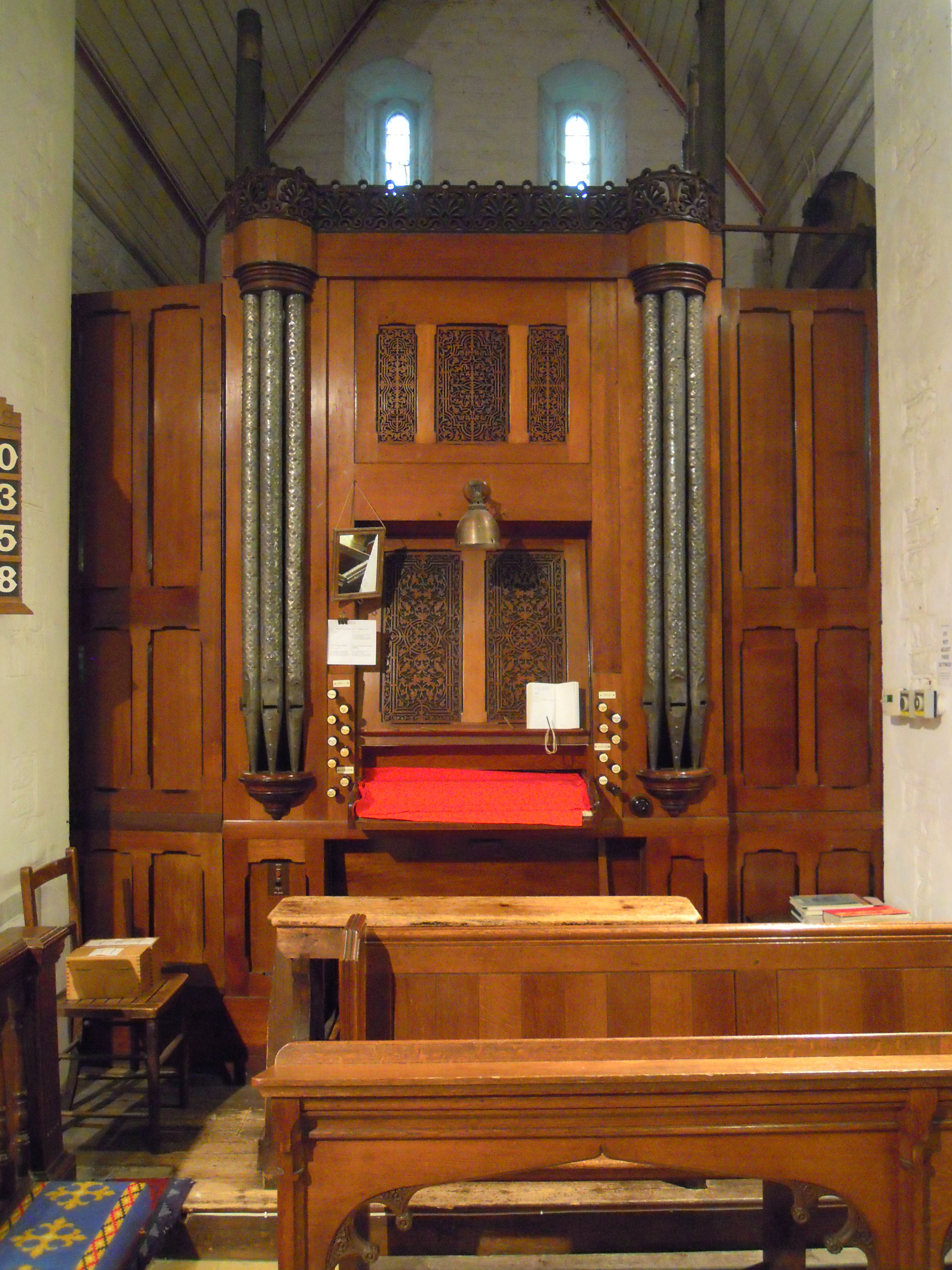
The church organ

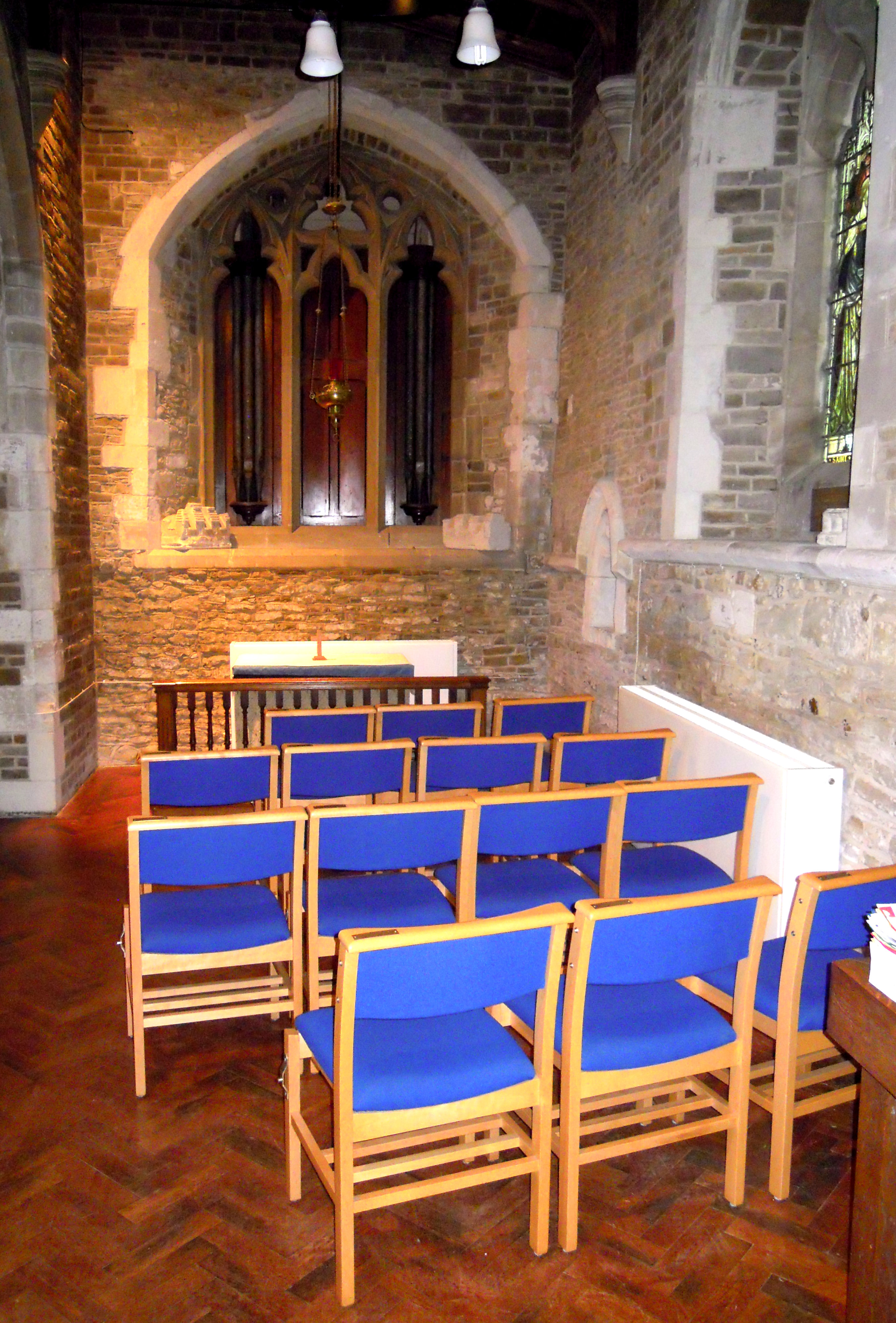
The side chapel

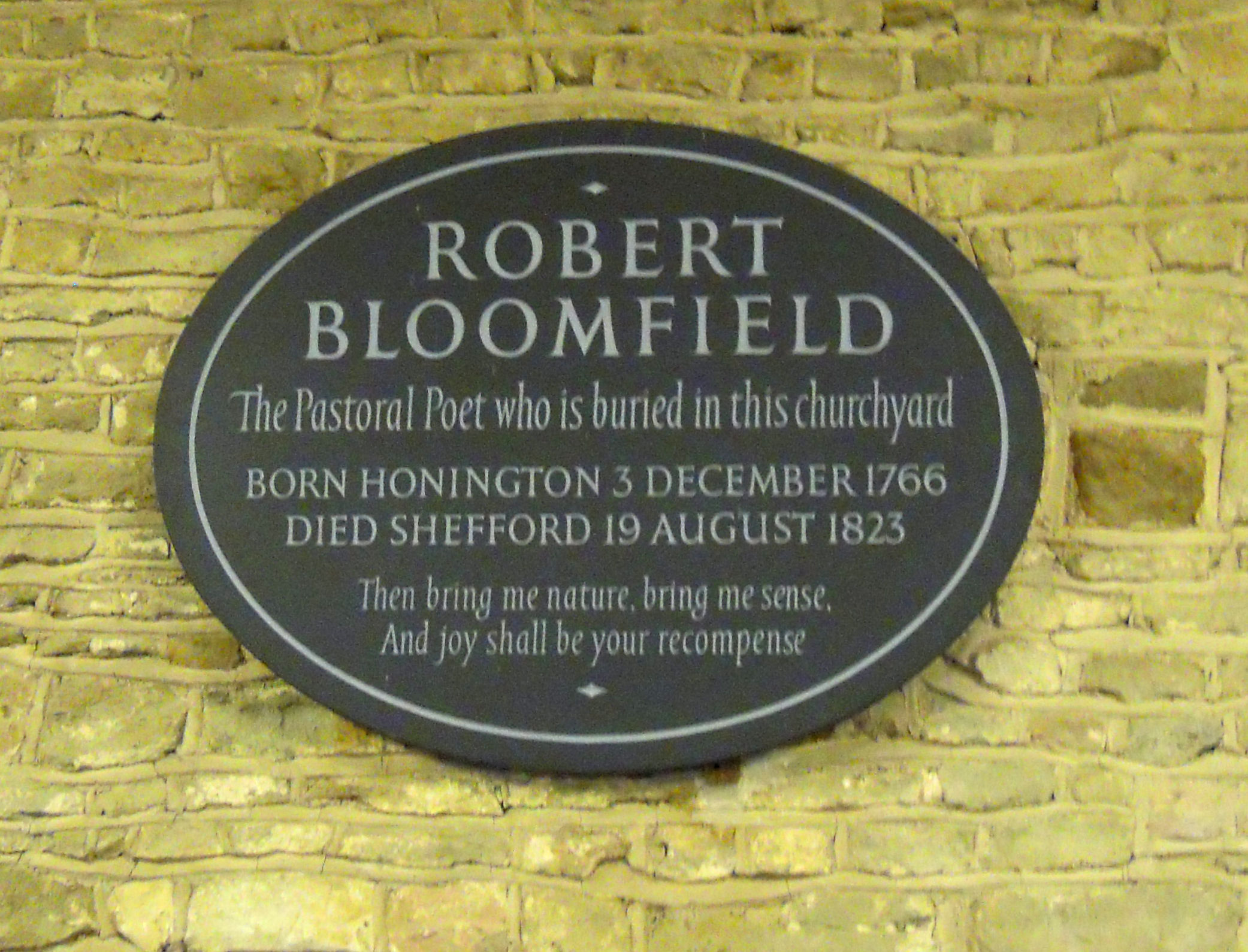
The memorial plaque to poet Robert Bloomfield
