= Pakenham and Troston Ward =

Electoral ward of West Suffolk, England

- ward West Suffolk District Council
- Local government in East of England: Suffolk

Current ward
- Created: 2019
- Councillor: Simon Brown (Conservative)

Pakenham and Troston Ward is one of a number of West Suffolk District Council wards created to come into force following the 2019 local elections held on 2 May 2019. This was part of the 2019–2023 structural changes to local government in England.
