= West Suffolk Independents =

Political party in Suffolk, England

- Leader: Ruth Allen
- Treasurer: Victor Lukaniuk
- Nominating Officer: Philip Wittam
- Founded: 4 September 2014
- Headquarters: 3 St Albans; Newmarket, Suffolk; CB8 7AJ
- West Suffolk Council: 7 / 64

The West Suffolk Independents is a minor localist political party operating within the West Suffolk District of Suffolk, England. It was registered with the Electoral Commission in September 2014, and the group has fielded the vast majority of its candidates during major district-wide elections mainly, in the former Forest Heath District and the unified West Suffolk District Council formed in 2019.

== Electoral history ==
=== District council ===
On 1 January 2015, Simon Cole, Forest Heath district councillor for Exning, announced the formation of the West Suffolk Independents (WSI), with the aim of supporting independent candidates standing for election to councils in Forest Heath and St Edmundsbury. Cole stated that the group's aim was to bring “more common sense” rather than party politics to parish, town and district councils in West Suffolk. They contested the 2015 Forest Heath District Council election, winning four seats with 4,218 votes (19.4%).

At the inaugural 2019 West Suffolk District Council election, the group put forward 10 candidates. The WSI won 7 seats and 3,074 votes (6.1% of the popular vote), making them the third-largest party in the newly consolidated chamber.

At the 2023 West Suffolk District Council election, the group fielded 11 candidates. The party won 9 seats, causing a major shift in local governance as the ruling Conservative Party lost its overall majority. Following the election, the West Suffolk Independents joined the "West Suffolk Working Partnership," an expansive cross-party coalition alongside Labour, the Liberal Democrats, and the Green Party to successfully take control of the local authority.

=== County council ===
At the 2017 Suffolk County Council election, the WSI elected their first candidate, Victor Lukaniuk onto Suffolk County Council, representing the Brandon division. Lukaniuk was subsequently re-elected for the division at the 2021 local elections.
