= 2019 West Suffolk District Council election =

2019 UK local government election

- 2 May 2019

All 64 seats to West Suffolk District Council 33 seats needed for a majority

	First party	Second party	Third party
Party	Conservative	Independent	WSI
Seats before	55 (Note: West Suffolk Council held no previous election, having been formed in 2019 from the merger of Forest Heath and St Edmundsbury. These figures are the BBC News "notional" 2015 baseline, calculated by projecting the 2015 results in the two predecessor councils onto the new West Suffolk wards. The BBC's notional calculation does not track West Suffolk Independents as a separate category, so the 55 notional Conservative seats include what became the 7 West Suffolk Independents seats after the 2019 election; no comparable notional figure is available for that party.)	3
Seats won	36	15	7
Seat change	▼12	▲12
Popular vote	24,134	9,860	3,074
Percentage	48.2%	19.7%	6.1%
	Fourth party	Fifth party
Party	Labour	Green
Seats before	2	0
Seats won	5	1
Seat change	▲3	▲1
Popular vote	9,159	1,047
Percentage	18.3%	2.1%
- Winner of each seat at the 2019 West Suffolk District Council election
Council control after election
Conservative

The 2019 West Suffolk District Council election was held on 2 May 2019 and was the inaugural election of the new West Suffolk District Council. It was held concurrently with other local elections across the United Kingdom.

The Conservative Party won 36 of the 64 seats, giving it outright control of the new council.

== Summary ==
=== Election result ===
2019 West Suffolk District Council election
Party	Candidates	Seats	Gains	Losses	Net gain/loss	Seats %	Votes %	Votes	+/−
Conservative	61	36	N/A	N/A	N/A	56.3	48.2	24,134	N/A
Independent	21	15	N/A	N/A	N/A	23.4	19.7	9,860	N/A
WSI	10	7	N/A	N/A	N/A	10.9	6.1	3,074	N/A
Labour	36	5	N/A	N/A	N/A	7.8	18.3	9,159	N/A
Green	3	1	N/A	N/A	N/A	1.6	2.1	1,047	N/A
Liberal Democrats	6	0	N/A	N/A	N/A	0.0	3.1	1,549	N/A
UKIP	4	0	N/A	N/A	N/A	0.0	2.4	1,219	N/A

== Ward results ==
Results for each ward at the 2 May 2019 election were as follows:

=== Abbeygate ===
Abbeygate
Party	Candidate	Votes	%
Green	Lisa Ingwall King	628	46.4
Conservative	Joanna Rayner	523	38.7
Conservative	Andrew Speed	484	35.8
Liberal Democrats	Christopher Lale	392	29.0
Labour	Nicola Iannelli-Popham	385	28.5
Majority		39	2.9
Turnout		1,378	37.0
Registered electors		3,724	
Green win (new seat)			
Conservative win (new seat)			

=== Bardwell ===
Bardwell
Party	Candidate	Votes	%
Conservative	Andrew Smith	518	73.2
UKIP	Julian Flood	190	26.8
Majority		328	46.3
Turnout		759	36.9
Registered electors		2,055	
Conservative win (new seat)			

=== Barningham ===
Barningham
Party	Candidate	Votes	%
Conservative	Carol Bull	Unopposed	
Registered electors			
Conservative win (new seat)			

=== Barrow ===
Barrow
Party	Candidate	Votes	%
Conservative	Ian Houlder	Unopposed	
Registered electors			
Conservative win (new seat)			

=== Brandon Central ===
Brandon Central
Party	Candidate	Votes	%
WSI	Victor Lukaniuk	292	58.4
Conservative	Francis Hart	91	18.2
Independent	Susan Smith	68	13.6
Labour	Susan Dean	50	10.0
Majority		201	40.2
Turnout		505	22.6
Registered electors		2,230	
WSI win (new seat)			

=== Brandon East ===
Brandon East
Party	Candidate	Votes	%
WSI	Philip Wittam	179	31.3
Conservative	Reginald Silvester	173	30.2
Independent	Peter Ridgwell	111	19.4
Labour	Andrew Erlam	59	10.3
Independent	Peter Callaghan	50	8.7
Majority		6	1.0
Turnout		581	26.4
Registered electors		2,200	
WSI win (new seat)			

=== Brandon West ===
Brandon West
Party	Candidate	Votes	%
WSI	David Palmer	267	46.6
Independent	Edward Stewar	177	30.9
Conservative	Christine Mason	128	22.3
Majority		90	15.7
Turnout		590	26.1
Registered electors		2,257	
WSI win (new seat)			

=== Chedburgh & Chevington ===
Chedburgh & Chevington
Party	Candidate	Votes	%
Conservative	Michael Chester	628	73.5
Labour	Gary Dillon	227	26.5
Majority		401	46.9
Turnout		886	41.9
Registered electors		2,117	
Conservative win (new seat)			

=== Clare, Hundon & Kedington ===
Clare, Hundon & Kedington
Party	Candidate	Votes	%
Conservative	Marion Rushbrook	1,134	49.6
Independent	James Meikle	1,025	44.9
Conservative	Karen Richardson	1,019	44.6
Conservative	Robin Pilley	822	36.0
UKIP	Stuart Letten	558	24.4
Majority		197	8.6
Turnout		2,353	38.4
Registered electors		6,122	
Conservative win (new seat)			
Independent win (new seat)			
Conservative win (new seat)			

=== Eastgate ===
Eastgate
Party	Candidate	Votes	%
Labour	Clifford Waterman	228	33.6
Independent	Patricia Warby	225	33.2
Conservative	Frankie Wright	225	33.2
Majority		3	0.4
Turnout		688	38.0
Registered electors		1,810	
Labour win (new seat)			

=== Exning ===
Exning
Party	Candidate	Votes	%
Conservative	Simon Cole	Unopposed	
Registered electors			
Conservative win (new seat)			

=== Haverhill Central ===
Haverhill Central
Party	Candidate	Votes	%
Independent	Aaron Luccarini	239	40.3
Conservative	Susan Roach	195	32.9
Labour	Roger Andre	159	26.8
Majority		44	7.4
Turnout		601	25.9
Registered electors		2,322	
Independent win (new seat)			

=== Haverhill East ===
Haverhill East
Party	Candidate	Votes	%
Independent	John Burns	246	41.2
Labour	Patrick Hanlon	226	37.9
Conservative	Bryan Hawes	207	34.7
Labour	Lora-Jane Miller-Jones	182	30.5
Conservative	Tatiana Chernyavskaya	156	26.1
Majority		19	3.2
Turnout		604	22.1
Registered electors		2,739	
Independent win (new seat)			
Labour win (new seat)			

=== Haverhill North ===
Haverhill North
Party	Candidate	Votes	%
Conservative	Elaine McManus	404	45.3
Conservative	Joseph Mason	373	41.8
UKIP	Ian Hirst	248	27.8
Green	Donald Allwright	240	26.9
Labour	Damian Page	221	24.8
Majority		125	14.0
Turnout		905	29.3
Registered electors		3,090	
Conservative win (new seat)			
Conservative win (new seat)			

=== Haverhill South ===
Haverhill South
Party	Candidate	Votes	%
Independent	Jason Crooks	310	39.4
Labour	David Smith	274	34.9
Labour	Elizabeth Smith	267	34.0
Conservative	Denis Lynch	207	26.3
Conservative	Heike Sowa	168	21.4
Liberal Democrats	Kenneth Rolph	136	17.3
Majority		7	0.9
Turnout		814	18.8
Registered electors		4,330	
Independent win (new seat)			
Labour win (new seat)			

=== Haverhill South East ===
Haverhill South East
Party	Candidate	Votes	%
Independent	Anthony Brown	346	56.0
Conservative	Liam Collins	172	27.8
Labour	Alan Stinchcombe	100	16.2
Majority		174	28.2
Turnout		620	32.5
Registered electors		1,905	
Independent win (new seat)			

=== Haverhill West ===
Haverhill West
Party	Candidate	Votes	%
Conservative	Margaret Marks	487	45.3
Conservative	David Roach	458	42.6
Labour	Rebecca Smith	396	36.9
Labour	Stuart Dillon	334	31.1
Independent	Paula Fox	302	28.1
Majority		62	5.8
Turnout		1,091	25.6
Registered electors		4,270	
Conservative win (new seat)			
Conservative win (new seat)			

=== Horringer ===
Horringer
Party	Candidate	Votes	%
Conservative	Terence Clements	524	68.9
Labour	Robin Davies	237	31.1
Majority		287	37.7
Turnout		783	39.3
Registered electors		1,993	
Conservative win (new seat)			

=== Iceni ===
Iceni
Party	Candidate	Votes	%
WSI	Dawn Dicker	373	46.7
WSI	Michael Bradshaw	259	32.4
Conservative	Jordon Millward	228	28.5
Conservative	Douglas Hall	219	27.4
Green	Simon Morse	179	22.4
Labour	Claire Unwin	104	13.0
Labour	Gaelle Kemp	95	11.9
Majority		31	3.9
Turnout		804	24.7
Registered electors		3,257	
WSI win (new seat)			
WSI win (new seat)			

=== Ixworth ===
Ixworth
Party	Candidate	Votes	%
Conservative	John Griffiths	Unopposed	
Majority			
Turnout			
Conservative win (new seat)			

=== Kentford & Moulton ===
Kentford & Moulton
Party	Candidate	Votes	%
WSI	Roger Dicker	518	58.1
Conservative	Thomas Kerby	248	27.8
Labour	Hilary Appleton	126	14.1
Majority		270	30.3
Turnout		897	42.4
Registered electors		2,117	
WSI win (new seat)			

=== Lakenheath ===
Lakenheath
Party	Candidate	Votes	%
Independent	David Gathercole	717	61.2
Conservative	Stephen Frost	537	45.8
Conservative	Colin Noble	438	37.4
Majority		99	8.4
Turnout		1,215	30.7
Registered electors		3,956	
Independent win (new seat)			
Conservative win (new seat)			

=== Manor ===
Manor
Party	Candidate	Votes	%
Conservative	Brian Harvey	Unopposed	
Majority			
Turnout			
Conservative win (new seat)			

=== Mildenhall Great Heath ===
Mildenhall Great Heath
Party	Candidate	Votes	%
Independent	Richard Alecock	432	79.0
Conservative	Russell Leaman	115	21.0
Majority		317	58.0
Turnout		556	27.1
Registered electors		2,052	
Independent win (new seat)			

=== Mildenhall Kingsway & Market ===
Mildenhall Kingsway & Market
Party	Candidate	Votes	%
Independent	Ian Shipp	399	62.3
Conservative	David Bowman	179	28.0
Labour	Patrick Finn	62	9.7
Majority		220	34.4
Turnout		642	31.2
Registered electors		2,057	
Independent win (new seat)			

=== Mildenhall Queensway ===
Mildenhall Queensway
Party	Candidate	Votes	%
Independent	Andrew Neal	379	57.3
Conservative	Ruth Bowman	283	42.7
Majority		96	14.5
Turnout		667	41.6
Registered electors		1,605	
Independent win (new seat)			

=== Minden ===
Minden
Party	Candidate	Votes	%
Conservative	Robert Everitt	622	40.8
Conservative	Clive Springett	546	35.8
Labour	Donna Higgins	488	32.0
Labour	Richard O'Driscoll	460	30.2
Liberal Democrats	Edward Allen	425	27.9
Liberal Democrats	Helen Korfanty	394	25.9
Majority		58	3.8
Turnout		1,556	36.6
Registered electors		4,246	
Conservative win (new seat)			
Conservative win (new seat)			

=== Moreton Hall ===
Moreton Hall
Party	Candidate	Votes	%
Independent	Trevor Beckwith	1,200	67.2
Independent	Francis Warby	1,058	59.2
Conservative	Peter Thompson	738	41.3
Conservative	Antony Whittingham	492	27.5
Labour	Cyrille Bouche	380	21.3
Majority		246	13.8
Turnout		1,792	32.5
Registered electors		5,511	
Independent win (new seat)			
Independent win (new seat)			
Conservative win (new seat)			

=== Newmarket East ===
Newmarket East
Party	Candidate	Votes	%
Conservative	Rachel Hood	353	37.6
Conservative	Robert Nobbs	337	35.9
WSI	Andrew Appleby	260	27.7
WSI	Christopher O'Neil	233	24.8
Labour	Robert Yarrow	196	20.9
Labour	Susan Perry	187	19.9
Liberal Democrats	Andrew Gillett	115	12.2
Liberal Democrats	John Derry	87	9.3
Majority		77	8.2
Turnout		947	24.6
Registered electors		3,858	
Conservative win (new seat)			
Conservative win (new seat)			

=== Newmarket North ===
Newmarket North
Party	Candidate	Votes	%
WSI	Michael Anderson	404	46.4
Conservative	Robin Millar	331	38.0
WSI	Ruth Allen	289	33.2
Conservative	Stephen Edwards	220	25.3
Labour	Oliver Bowen	195	22.4
Labour	Duncan Russell	182	20.9
Majority		42	4.8
Turnout		890	25.5
Registered electors		3,494	
WSI win (new seat)			
Conservative win (new seat)			

=== Newmarket West ===
Newmarket West
Party	Candidate	Votes	%
Conservative	Andrew Drummond	482	49.0
Conservative	Winston Lay	376	38.3
Labour	Michael Jeffreys	350	35.6
Labour	Yasemin Fitzgerald	319	32.5
UKIP	David Hudson	223	22.7
Majority		26	2.6
Turnout		1,006	27.6
Registered electors		3,651	
Conservative win (new seat)			
Conservative win (new seat)			

=== Pakenham & Troston ===
Pakenham & Troston
Party	Candidate	Votes	%
Conservative	Simon Brown	Unopposed	
Majority			
Turnout			
Conservative win (new seat)			

=== Risby ===
Risby
Party	Candidate	Votes	%
Conservative	Susan Glossop	565	73.0
Labour	Sheila Rowell	209	27.0
Majority		356	46.0
Turnout		802	36.1
Registered electors		2,221	
Conservative win (new seat)			

=== Rougham ===
Rougham
Party	Candidate	Votes	%
Conservative	Sara Mildmay-White	491	74.1
Labour	Quentin Cornish	171	25.8
Majority		320	48.3
Turnout		680	36.9
Registered electors		1,844	
Conservative win (new seat)			

=== Southgate ===
Southgate
Party	Candidate	Votes	%
Conservative	Hung Chung	902	72.9
Conservative	Ann Williamson	720	58.2
Labour	Ian Cullen	406	32.8
Majority		314	25.4
Turnout		1,262	39.0
Registered electors		3,239	
Conservative win (new seat)			
Conservative win (new seat)			

=== Stanton ===
Stanton
Party	Candidate	Votes	%
Conservative	John Thorndyke	Unopposed	
Majority			
Turnout			
Conservative win (new seat)			

=== St. Olaves ===
St. Olaves
Party	Candidate	Votes	%
Independent	Paul Hopfensperger	680	71.4
Labour	Max Clarke	341	35.8
Conservative	Karen Soons	314	33.0
Majority		27	2.8
Turnout		953	30.4
Registered electors		3,135	
Independent win (new seat)			
Labour win (new seat)			

=== The Fornhams & Great Barton ===
The Fornhams & Great Barton
Party	Candidate	Votes	%
Conservative	Rebecca Hopfensperger	942	71.6
Conservative	Sarah Broughton	890	67.6
Labour	Darren Turner	352	26.7
Majority		538	40.9
Turnout		1,345	41.1
Registered electors		3,275	
Conservative win (new seat)			
Conservative win (new seat)			

=== The Rows ===
The Rows
Party	Candidate	Votes	%
Independent	John Smith	636	60.6
Independent	Donald Waldron	467	44.5
Conservative	James Waters	402	38.3
Conservative	Lance Stanbury	306	29.2
Majority		65	6.2
Turnout		1,059	31.9
Registered electors		3,321	
Independent win (new seat)			
Independent win (new seat)			

=== Tollgate ===
Tollgate
Party	Candidate	Votes	%
Independent	David Nettleton	793	69.8
Labour	Diane Hind	484	42.6
Conservative	John Levantis	361	31.8
Majority		123	10.8
Turnout		1,153	28.3
Registered electors		4,070	
Independent win (new seat)			
Labour win (new seat)			

=== Westgate ===
Westgate
Party	Candidate	Votes	%
Conservative	Richard Rout	933	64.2
Conservative	John Augustine	848	58.3
Labour	Marilyn Sayer	554	38.1
Majority		294	20.2
Turnout		1,497	38.6
Registered electors		3,873	
Conservative win (new seat)			
Conservative win (new seat)			

=== Whepstead & Wickhambrook ===
Whepstead & Wickhambrook
Party	Candidate	Votes	%
Conservative	Alison Evans	620	80.2
Labour	Michael McConnell	153	19.8
Majority		467	60.4
Turnout		797	39.7
Registered electors		2,006	
Conservative win (new seat)			

=== Withersfield ===
Withersfield
Party	Candidate	Votes	%
Conservative	Peter Stevens	Unopposed	
Majority			
Turnout			
Conservative win (new seat)			

== Changes 2019–2023 ==
- Moreton Hall councillor Frank Warby, elected as an independent in 2019, had joined the Conservative group by June 2020, when he resigned from the council and the party amid a dispute over Facebook posts he had shared.
- Exning councillor Simon Cole, elected as a Conservative in 2019, was sitting with the West Suffolk Independents group by July 2022.
- Kentford and Moulton councillor Roger Dicker, elected for the West Suffolk Independents in 2019, was sitting as a non-grouped independent by July 2022.
- Brandon West councillor David Palmer, elected for the West Suffolk Independents in 2019, was sitting as a Conservative by July 2022.
- St. Olaves councillor Max Clarke, elected as Labour in 2019, was sitting as an independent by July 2022.
- Haverhill North councillor Elaine McManus, elected as a Conservative in 2019, had left the Conservative group by August 2022 and resigned as a councillor in September 2022 after being convicted of bribery in connection with a false statement made to Ofsted. No by-election was held to fill the vacancy before the 2023 election.
- Tollgate councillor David Nettleton, elected as an independent in 2019, was sitting as a Conservative by July 2022.

=== By-elections ===
==== Newmarket North ====
A by-election was held in Newmarket North on 30 January 2020, following the resignation of Conservative councillor Robin Millar after his election as MP for Aberconwy at the 2019 general election.

Newmarket North: 30 January 2020
Party	Candidate	Votes	%	±%
Conservative	Karen Soons	309	42.4	+17.1
Liberal Democrats	Jonathan Edge	130	17.9	N/A
WSI	Ruth Allen	118	16.2	−17.0
Labour	Theresa Chipulina	73	10.0	−12.4
Independent	Frank Stennett	54	7.4	N/A
Green	Alice Haylock	44	6.0	N/A
Majority		179	24.6	
Turnout		733	19.5	
Registered electors		3,756		
Conservative hold		Swing		

==== Abbeygate ====
A by-election was held in Abbeygate on 6 May 2021, following the resignation of Green councillor Lisa Ingwall King due to the long-term effects of COVID-19.

Abbeygate: 6 May 2021
Party	Candidate	Votes	%	±%
Green	Julia Wakelam	751	45.9	+13.3
Conservative	Nick Wiseman	606	37.0	+9.9
Labour	Cheryl Godber	279	17.0	–2.9
Majority		145	8.9	N/A
Turnout		1,655	43.2	+6.2
Registered electors		3,828		
Green hold		Swing	▲1.7	

==== Clare, Hundon and Kedington ====
A by-election was held in Clare, Hundon and Kedington on 6 May 2021, following the death of independent councillor Jim Meikle on 22 February 2021.

Clare, Hundon and Kedington: 6 May 2021
Party	Candidate	Votes	%	±%
Conservative	Nick Clarke	1,814	72.5	
Labour	Kerry Rogers	697	27.9	
Majority		1,117	44.6	
Turnout		2,532	40.2	+1.8
Registered electors		6,295		
Conservative gain from Independent		Swing		

==== Lakenheath ====
A by-election was held in Lakenheath on 6 May 2021, following the death of independent councillor David Gathercole on 22 August 2020.

Lakenheath: 6 May 2021
Party	Candidate	Votes	%	±%
Conservative	Colin Noble	573	48.2	
Independent	Gerald Kelly	434	36.5	
Labour	Layla Britton	119	10.0	
Independent	David Chandler	64	5.4	
Majority		139	11.7	
Turnout		1,196	28.9	
Registered electors		4,134		
Conservative gain from Independent		Swing		

==== Moreton Hall ====
A by-election was held in Moreton Hall on 6 May 2021, following the resignation of Conservative councillor Frank Warby on 15 June 2020.

Moreton Hall: 6 May 2021
Party	Candidate	Votes	%	±%
Conservative	Birgitte Mager	1,098	52.6	
Independent	Barry Thomas	496	23.7	
Labour	Cyrille Bouche	495	23.7	
Majority		602	28.8	
Turnout		2,104	35.9	
Registered electors		5,855		
Conservative gain from Independent		Swing		

==== Southgate ====
A by-election was held in Southgate on 6 May 2021, following the resignation of councillor Ann Williamson.

Southgate: 6 May 2021
Party	Candidate	Votes	%	±%
Conservative	Sarah Stamp	814	58.2	
Labour	Richard O'Driscoll	251	17.9	
Green	Chris Dexter-Mills	186	13.3	
Liberal Democrats	Helen Korfanty	148	10.6	
Majority		563	40.2	
Turnout		1,407	43.7	
Registered electors		3,220		
Conservative hold		Swing		

==== Whepstead and Wickhambrook ====
A by-election was held in Whepstead and Wickhambrook on 6 May 2021, following the resignation of Conservative councillor Mary Evans.

Whepstead and Wickhambrook: 6 May 2021
Party	Candidate	Votes	%	±%
Conservative	Sarah Pugh	645	69.8	
Labour	Robin Davies	142	15.4	
Green	Vicki Martin	137	14.8	
Majority		503	54.4	
Turnout		931	45.0	
Registered electors		2,071		
Conservative hold		Swing		

==== The Rows ====
A by-election was held in The Rows on 30 September 2021, following the death of independent councillor John Smith.

The Rows: 30 September 2021
Party	Candidate	Votes	%	±%
Conservative	Lance Stanbury	428	65.2	+26.5
Labour	Theresa Chipulina	126	19.2	N/A
Liberal Democrats	Robert Pinsker	102	15.5	N/A
Majority		302	46.0	
Turnout		677	18.0	
Registered electors		3,759		
Conservative gain from Independent		Swing	▲3.7	

==== Horringer ====
A by-election was held in Horringer on 25 November 2021, following the resignation of Conservative councillor Terry Clements, who had served on the council for more than 38 years.

Horringer: 25 November 2021
Party	Candidate	Votes	%	±%
Conservative	Nick Wiseman	257	47.7	
Labour	Aaron McIntyre	204	37.8	
Liberal Democrats	Daniel Linehan	78	14.5	
Majority		53	9.8	
Turnout		542	26.8	
Registered electors		2,022		
Conservative hold		Swing		
