= Campton, Bedfordshire =

Village in the Central Bedfordshire district of Bedfordshire, England

Coordinates: 52.029°N 0.358°W

Campton
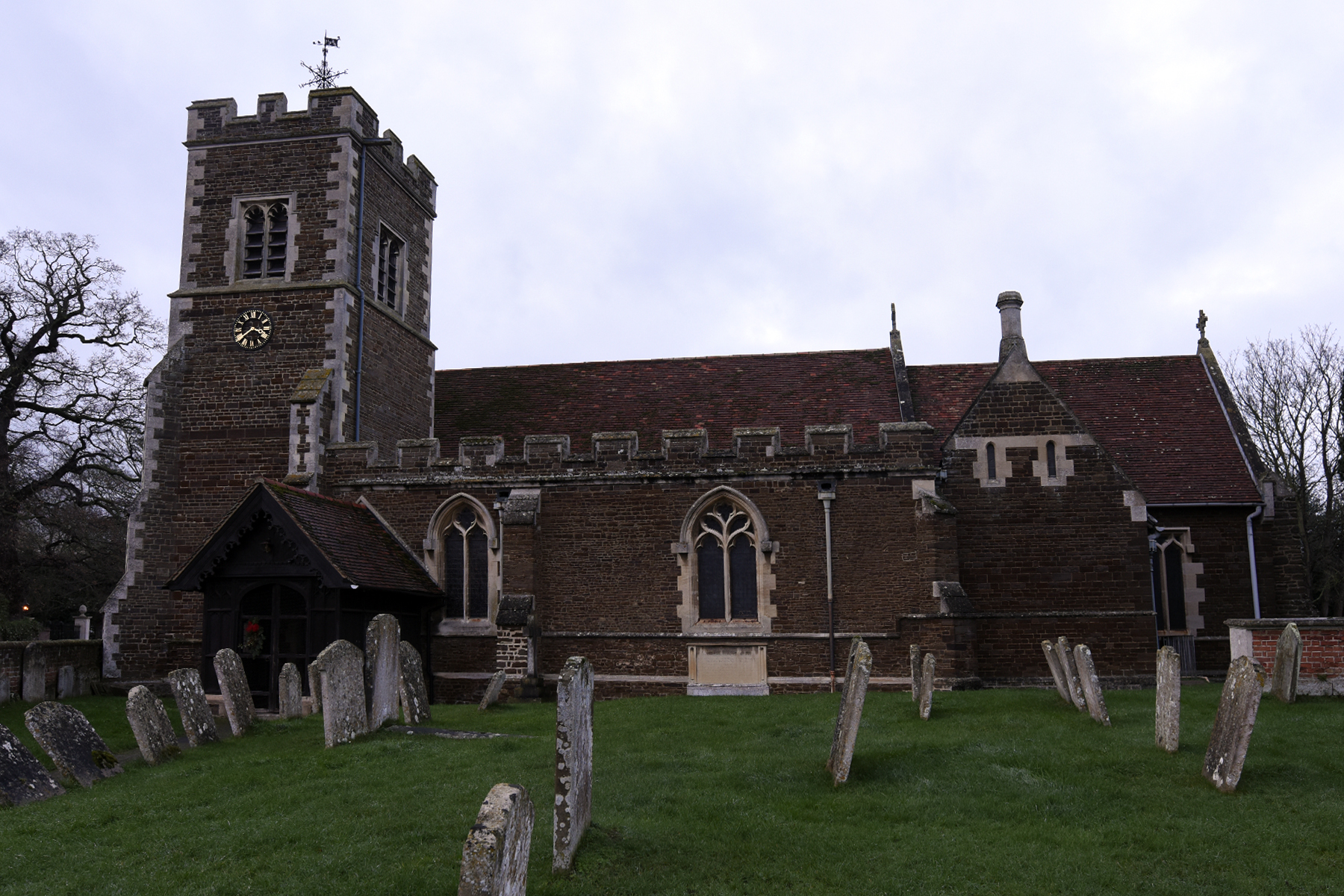
- Campton church

- Location within Bedfordshire
- OS grid reference: TL0523
- Civil parish: Campton and Chicksands
- Unitary authority: Central Bedfordshire
- Ceremonial county: Bedfordshire
- Region: East
- Country: England
- Sovereign state: United Kingdom
- Post town: SHEFFORD
- Postcode district: SG17
- Dialling code: 01462
- Police: Bedfordshire
- Fire: Bedfordshire
- Ambulance: East of England
- UK Parliament: Hitchin

Campton is a village in the civil parish of Campton and Chicksands, in the Central Bedfordshire district of Bedfordshire, England. It is about 9 miles (14 km) south of Bedford, and is about 9 miles (14 km) north-west from Letchworth and sits on a tributary of the River Ivel. It is just to the west of Shefford. The 13th century Church of All Saints is in the centre of the village.

== History ==
Campton is mentioned in the Domesday Book. The entry reads: Chambeltone: Ralph de Lanquetot from Walter Giffard; Fulbert from Willian d'Eu; Thurstan. The name Campton is derived from a British stream name similar to the name Camel in Cornwall.

Campton was an ancient parish in the Clifton Hundred of Bedfordshire. The parish historically included Shefford, which had its own chapel of ease from at least the 15th century. Parish functions under the poor laws from the 17th century onwards were administered separately for the chapelry of Shefford and the rest of Campton parish. As such, Shefford and Campton became separate civil parishes in 1866 when the legal definition of 'parish' was changed to be the areas used for administering the poor laws. Shefford remained part of the ecclesiastical parish of Campton until 1903.

In 1985 the civil parish of Campton was merged with the neighbouring parish of Chicksands to become a new parish called Campton and Chicksands. At the 1981 census (the last before the abolition of the parish), Campton had a population of 1391.

== Geography ==
The Campton Brook (or the River Hit) is located in Campton, where it joins the River Flit near Shefford, Bedfordshire.

=== Geology and Landscape ===
The underlying geology of Campton has a type of sandstone called Woburn Sands Formation which laid down 99 and 121 million years ago during the Cretaceous period. South-east of the River Hit, sediment such as gault is a mudstone which laid down 99 to 112 million years ago.

Campton is a low-lying parish. The church stands at 150 ft (46 m) above sea level, most of the parish is predominantly 10 ft (3.0 m).

== Governance ==
Campton is in the Hitchin parliamentary constituency and the elected member is Alistair Strathern of the Labour Party.

== Education ==
It is in the catchment zone for Robert Bloomfield Academy. It is also in the catchment zone for Samuel Whitbread Academy, which has an upper school and sixth form.
