= 2023 West Suffolk District Council election =

- 4 May 2023

All 64 seats to West Suffolk District Council 33 seats needed for a majority
- Turnout: 30.4%
	First party	Second party	Third party
Leader	John Griffiths	Diane Hind
Party	Conservative	Labour	Independent
Last election	36 seats, 48.2%	5 seats, 18.3%	15 seats, 19.7%
Seats before	37	4	13 (Note: Of the 13 independent councillors on the council before the election, 12 formed the "Independent Group", led by Ian Shipp)
Seats won	26	17	10
Seat change	▼10	▲12	▼5
Popular vote	23,997	16,523	5,082
Percentage	44.1%	30.4%	9.3%
Swing	▼4.1%	▲12.1%	▼10.4%
	Fourth party	Fifth party	Sixth party
Party	WSI	Green	Liberal Democrats
Last election	7 seats, 6.1%	1 seat, 2.1%	0 seats, 3.1%
Seats before	6	1	0
Seats won	9	1	1
Seat change	▲2	Steady	▲1
Popular vote	4,307	2,266	1,649
Percentage	7.9%	4.2%	3.0%
Swing	▲1.8%	▲2.1%	▼0.1%
- Winner of each seat at the 2023 West Suffolk District Council election.
Leader before election
John Griffiths
Conservative
Leader after election
Cliff Waterman
Labour
No overall control

The 2023 West Suffolk District Council election took place on 4 May 2023 to elect members of West Suffolk District Council in Suffolk, England. This was on the same day as other local elections in England.

== Summary ==
The council had been under Conservative majority control prior to the election. After the election the Conservatives remained the largest group, but lost their majority. A coalition of Labour, the West Suffolk Independents, Liberal Democrats, Greens and independent councillors formed after the election, with Labour councillor Cliff Waterman being appointed the new leader of the council at the subsequent annual council meeting on 23 May 2023.

=== Election result ===
2023 West Suffolk District Council election
Party	Candidates	Seats	Gains	Losses	Net gain/loss	Seats %	Votes %	Votes	+/−
Conservative	58	26	2	12	▼10	40.6	44.1	23,997	–4.1
Labour	41	17	12	0	▲12	26.6	30.4	16,523	+12.1
Independent	19	10	3	8	▼5	15.6	9.3	5,082	–10.4
WSI	12	9	3	1	▲2	14.1	7.9	4,307	+1.8
Green	6	1	0	0	Steady	1.6	4.2	2,266	+2.1
Liberal Democrats	6	1	1	0	▲1	1.6	3.0	1,649	–0.1
Reform	2	0	0	0	Steady	0.0	0.9	470	N/A
Communist	1	0	0	0	Steady	0.0	0.1	74	N/A

== Ward results ==
The Statement of Persons Nominated, which details the candidates standing in each ward, was released by West Suffolk District Council following the close of nominations on 5 April 2023. The results for each ward were as follows, with an asterisk (*) indicating an incumbent councillor standing for re-election:

=== Abbeygate ===
Abbeygate (2 seats)
Party	Candidate	Votes	%	±%
Green	Julia Wakelam*	796	54.7	+9.1
Conservative	Jo Rayner*	575	39.5	+1.5
Labour	Nicola Iannelli-Popham	515	35.4	+7.5
Labour	Anabelle Mackenzie	433	29.8	N/A
Communist	Darren Turner	74	5.1	N/A
Turnout		1,455	40.0	+3.0
Registered electors		3,635		
Green hold				
Conservative hold				

=== Bardwell ===
Bardwell
Party	Candidate	Votes	%	±%
Conservative	Andrew Smith*	Unopposed		
Registered electors				
Conservative hold				

=== Barningham ===
Barningham
Party	Candidate	Votes	%	±%
Conservative	Carol Bull*	529	66.7	N/A
Labour	Alexander Callum	264	33.3	N/A
Majority		265	33.4	N/A
Turnout		804	37.6	N/A
Registered electors		2,139		
Conservative hold		Swing	N/A	

=== Barrow ===
Barrow
Party	Candidate	Votes	%	±%
Conservative	Ian Houlder*	350	47.9	N/A
Labour	Theo Williams	192	26.3	N/A
Liberal Democrats	Zigurds Kronbergs	189	25.9	N/A
Majority		158	21.6	N/A
Turnout		736	36.2	N/A
Registered electors		2,036		
Conservative hold		Swing	N/A	

=== Brandon Central ===
Brandon Central
Party	Candidate	Votes	%	±%
WSI	Jools Savage	290	58.9	+0.6
Conservative	Tony Simmons	202	41.1	+22.9
Majority		88	17.8	–22.3
Turnout		499	22.6	–0.1
Registered electors		2,208		
WSI hold		Swing	▼11.2	

=== Brandon East ===
Brandon East
Party	Candidate	Votes	%	±%
WSI	Phil Wittam*	275	48.5	+17.2
Conservative	Christine Mason	154	27.2	–3.0
Independent	Susan Smith	138	24.3	N/A
Majority		121	21.3	+20.2
Turnout		570	26.1	–0.3
Registered electors		2,181		
WSI hold		Swing	▲10.1	

=== Brandon West ===
Brandon West
Party	Candidate	Votes	%	±%
WSI	Victor Lukaniuk*	310	57.2	+10.5
Conservative	David Palmer*	232	42.8	+20.4
Majority		78	14.4	–1.4
Turnout		551	24.7	–1.4
Registered electors		2,227		
WSI hold		Swing	▼5.0	

=== Chedburgh & Chevington ===
Chedburgh & Chevington
Party	Candidate	Votes	%	±%
Conservative	Mike Chester*	Unopposed		
Registered electors				
Conservative hold				

=== Clare, Hundon & Kedington ===
Clare, Hundon & Kedington (3 seats)
Party	Candidate	Votes	%	±%
Conservative	Nick Clarke	1,381	71.6	N/A
Conservative	Karen Richardson*	1,226	63.6	+20.3
Conservative	Marion Rushbrook*	1,226	63.6	+15.4
Reform	Robin Turbefield	354	18.4	N/A
Turnout		1,928	31.7	–6.7
Registered electors		6,087		
Conservative gain from Independent				
Conservative hold				
Conservative hold				

=== Eastgate ===
Eastgate
Party	Candidate	Votes	%	±%
Labour	Cliff Waterman*	415	63.8	+30.2
Conservative	Zachary Bastiani	235	36.2	+3.0
Majority		180	27.6	+27.2
Turnout		663	38.4	+0.4
Registered electors		1,729		
Labour hold		Swing	▲13.6	

=== Exning ===
Exning
Party	Candidate	Votes	%	±%
Liberal Democrats	Jon London	413	64.9	N/A
Conservative	Terry Wood	223	35.1	N/A
Majority		190	29.8	N/A
Turnout		639	37.1	N/A
Registered electors		1,723		
Liberal Democrats gain from Conservative		Swing	N/A	

=== Haverhill Central ===
Haverhill Central
Party	Candidate	Votes	%	±%
Independent	Aaron Luccarini*	229	38.2	–2.1
Labour	Mary Martin	221	36.9	+10.1
Conservative	Heike Sowa	149	24.9	–8.0
Majority		8	1.3	–6.1
Turnout		603	25.1	–0.8
Registered electors		2,401		
Independent hold		Swing	▼6.1	

=== Haverhill East ===
Haverhill East (2 seats)
Party	Candidate	Votes	%	±%
Labour	Pat Hanlon*	303	53.5	+16.1
Labour	Lora Miller-Jones	279	49.3	+19.2
Independent	John Burns*	222	39.2	–1.5
Conservative	Abbey Khawaja	160	28.3	–6.0
Turnout		566	19.8	–2.3
Registered electors		2,863		
Labour hold				
Labour gain from Independent				

=== Haverhill North ===
Haverhill North (2 seats)
Party	Candidate	Votes	%	±%
Independent	Paul Firman	462	47.8	N/A
Conservative	Joe Mason*	422	43.6	+2.4
Labour	Quinn Cox	412	42.6	+18.2
Conservative	Lisa Mason	362	37.4	–7.2
Turnout		967	26.7	–2.6
Registered electors		3,621		
Independent gain from Conservative				
Conservative hold				

=== Haverhill South ===
Haverhill South (2 seats)
Party	Candidate	Votes	%	±%
Labour	David Smith*	383	53.0	+19.3
Labour	Liz Smith	353	48.8	+16.0
Independent	Jason Crooks*	352	48.7	+10.6
Turnout		723	16.9	–1.9
Registered electors		4,276		
Labour hold				
Labour gain from Independent				

=== Haverhill South East ===
Haverhill South East
Party	Candidate	Votes	%	±%
Independent	Tony Brown*	363	72.0	+16.0
Labour	Roger Andre	141	28.0	+11.8
Majority		222	44.0	
Turnout		517	28.5	
Registered electors		1,815		
Independent hold		Swing	▲2.1	

=== Haverhill West ===
Haverhill West (2 seats)
Party	Candidate	Votes	%	±%
Labour	Andrew Martin	455	41.6	+4.7
Conservative	Margaret Marks*	421	38.5	–6.8
Labour	Damian Page	413	37.8	+6.7
Conservative	David Roach*	358	32.8	–9.8
Independent	Bruce Davidson	335	30.6	N/A
Turnout		1,093	25.7	
Registered electors		4,249		
Labour gain from Conservative				
Conservative hold				

=== Horringer ===
Horringer
Party	Candidate	Votes	%	±%
Conservative	Karen Soons	418	49.8	–19.1
Green	Mark Ereira-Guyer	249	29.7	N/A
Labour	Quentin Cornish	172	20.5	–10.6
Majority		169	20.1	
Turnout		843	40.7	
Registered electors		2,074		
Conservative hold		Swing	N/A	

=== Iceni ===
Iceni (2 seats)
Party	Candidate	Votes	%	±%
WSI	Dawn Dicker*	354	47.5	+0.8
Conservative	Andy Drummond	240	32.2	+3.7
Green	Simon Morse	231	31.0	+8.6
Labour	Keith Holland	227	30.4	+17.4
WSI	Lee Anderson	201	26.9	–5.5
Turnout		746	19.1	
Registered electors		3,917		
WSI hold				
Conservative gain from WSI				

=== Ixworth ===
Ixworth
Party	Candidate	Votes	%	±%
Conservative	John Griffiths*	242	39.2	N/A
Independent	Ben Lord	211	34.1	N/A
Labour	Helen Vicat	165	26.7	N/A
Majority		31	5.1	N/A
Turnout		622	36.4	N/A
Registered electors		1,710		
Conservative hold		Swing	N/A	

=== Kentford & Moulton ===
Kentford & Moulton
Party	Candidate	Votes	%	±%
WSI	Roger Dicker*	517	57.4	–0.7
Conservative	Bobby Bennett	216	24.0	+3.3
Labour	Hilary Appleton	167	18.6	–2.5
Majority		301	26.3	
Turnout		906	39.9	
Registered electors		2,269		
WSI hold		Swing	▼2.0	

=== Lakenheath ===
Lakenheath (2 seats)
Party	Candidate	Votes	%	±%
Independent	Gerald Kelly	660	55.5	N/A
Independent	Tracy Whitehand	606	50.9	N/A
Conservative	Stephen Frost*	453	38.1	–7.7
Conservative	Colin Noble	379	31.8	–5.6
Turnout		1,190	29.5	
Registered electors		4,034		
Independent gain from Conservative				
Independent hold				

=== Manor ===
Manor
Party	Candidate	Votes	%	±%
WSI	Dave Taylor	355	50.9	N/A
Conservative	Brian Harvey*	342	49.1	N/A
Majority		13	1.8	N/A
Turnout		706	34.4	N/A
Registered electors		2,050		
WSI gain from Conservative		Swing	N/A	

=== Mildenhall Great Heath ===
Mildenhall Great Heath
Party	Candidate	Votes	%	±%
Independent	Richard Alecock*	362	82.1	+2.1
Conservative	Russell Leaman	79	17.9	–2.1
Majority		283	36.8	
Turnout		444	21.8	
Registered electors		2,037		
Independent hold		Swing	▼10.6	

=== Mildenhall Kingsway & Market ===
Mildenhall Kingsway & Market
Party	Candidate	Votes	%	±%
Independent	Ian Shipp*	382	64.5	–1.3
Conservative	Melanie Thielker	114	19.3	+2.5
Labour	Patrick Finn	96	16.2	–1.2
Majority		268	30.5	
Turnout		592	28.1	
Registered electors		2,107		
Independent hold		Swing	▼1.9	

=== Mildenhall Queensway ===
Mildenhall Queensway
Party	Candidate	Votes	%	±%
Independent	Andy Neal*	Unopposed		
Registered electors				
Independent hold				

=== Minden ===
Minden (2 seats)
Party	Candidate	Votes	%	±%
Labour	Donna Higgins	831	49.6	+17.6
Labour	Richard O'Driscoll	744	44.4	+14.2
Conservative	Robert Everitt*	602	36.0	–4.8
Conservative	Chris Turner	482	28.8	–7.0
Liberal Democrats	Helen Korfanty	320	19.1	–8.8
Liberal Democrats	Robert Pinsker	192	11.5	–14.4
Turnout		1,674	40.0	
Registered electors		4,188		
Labour gain from Conservative				
Labour gain from Conservative				

=== Moreton Hall ===
Moreton Hall (3 seats)
Party	Candidate	Votes	%	±%
Labour	Peter Armitage	810	46.3	+25.0
Labour	Rowena Lindberg	797	45.6	N/A
Conservative	Birgitte Mager*	782	44.7	+17.2
Labour	Umor Haque	757	43.3	N/A
Conservative	Peter Thompson*	716	40.9	–0.4
Conservative	Derrick Maher	711	40.7	N/A
Turnout		1,749	30.5	
Registered electors		5,735		
Labour gain from Independent				
Labour gain from Independent				
Conservative hold				

=== Newmarket East ===
Newmarket East (2 seats)
Party	Candidate	Votes	%	±%
Labour	Sue Perry	358	34.7	+13.6
Conservative	Rachel Hood*	317	30.7	–7.1
Liberal Democrats	Jonny Edge	309	29.9	+17.6
Conservative	Robert Nobbs*	306	29.6	–6.4
WSI	Jonathan Richer	292	28.3	+0.4
Independent	Tom Kerby	245	23.7	N/A
Turnout		1,038	25.5	
Registered electors		4,070		
Labour gain from Conservative				
Conservative hold				

=== Newmarket North ===
Newmarket North (2 seats)
Party	Candidate	Votes	%	±%
WSI	Michael Anderson*	483	53.4	+7.0
Labour	Janne Jarvis	347	38.4	+16.0
Conservative	Chris Burton	313	34.6	–3.4
WSI	Paula Stainton	290	32.1	–1.1
Turnout		904	25.0	
Registered electors		3,614		
WSI hold				
Labour gain from Conservative				

=== Newmarket West ===
Newmarket West (2 seats)
Party	Candidate	Votes	%	±%
Labour	Kevin Yarrow	475	48.1	+12.5
Conservative	Charlie Lynch	377	38.2	–10.8
Conservative	Chloe Pitts	364	36.8	–1.5
Green	Caroline Warn	343	34.7	N/A
Reform	Adrian Whittle	116	11.7	N/A
Turnout		988	26.5	
Registered electors		3,734		
Labour gain from Conservative				
Conservative hold				

=== Pakenham & Troston ===
Pakenham & Troston
Party	Candidate	Votes	%	±%
Conservative	Andrew Speed	310	53.4	N/A
Labour	Shirley Stephenson	271	46.6	N/A
Majority		39	6.8	N/A
Turnout		592	31.6	N/A
Registered electors		1,875		
Conservative hold		Swing	N/A	

=== Risby ===
Risby
Party	Candidate	Votes	%	±%
Conservative	Susan Glossop*	506	64.0	–9.0
Labour	Peter Appleton	285	36.0	+9.0
Majority		221	28.0	
Turnout		805	35.6	
Registered electors		2,264		
Conservative hold		Swing	▼9.0	

=== Rougham ===
Rougham
Party	Candidate	Votes	%	±%
Conservative	Sara Mildmay-White*	455	66.1	–8.1
Labour	Ian Cullen	233	33.9	+8.1
Majority		222	32.2	
Turnout		705	38.1	
Registered electors		1,850		
Conservative hold		Swing	▼8.1	

=== Southgate ===
Southgate (2 seats)
Party	Candidate	Votes	%	±%
Conservative	Patrick Chung*	705	55.4	–17.5
Conservative	Sarah Stamp	615	48.3	–9.9
Labour	Judith Moore	388	30.5	–2.3
Green	Chris Dexter-Mills	339	26.7	N/A
Labour	Cheryl Godber	329	25.9	N/A
Turnout		1,272	41.1	
Registered electors		3,095		
Conservative hold				
Conservative hold				

=== Stanton ===
Stanton
Party	Candidate	Votes	%	±%
Independent	Jim Thorndyke*	Unopposed		
Registered electors				
Independent gain from Conservative				

=== St Olaves ===
St Olaves (2 seats)
Party	Candidate	Votes	%	±%
Labour	Luke Halpin	511	51.1	+15.3
Independent	Frank Stennett	440	44.0	N/A
Labour	Mike Smith	418	41.8	N/A
Conservative	Tom Murray	219	21.9	–11.1
Conservative	James Cockram	166	16.6	N/A
Turnout		1,000	24.0	
Registered electors		4,161		
Labour hold				
Independent hold				

=== The Fornhams & Great Barton ===
The Fornhams & Great Barton (2 seats)
Party	Candidate	Votes	%	±%
Conservative	Beccy Hopfensperger*	765	53.2	–18.4
Conservative	Sarah Broughton*	719	50.0	–17.6
Labour	Bruce Martin	383	26.6	–0.1
Green	Jonathan King	308	21.4	N/A
Labour	Brendan Moore	278	19.3	N/A
Liberal Democrats	John Derry	226	15.7	N/A
Turnout		1,438	44.5	
Registered electors		3,233		
Conservative hold				
Conservative hold				

=== The Rows ===
The Rows (2 seats)
Party	Candidate	Votes	%	±%
WSI	Mick Bradshaw	470	50.2	N/A
WSI	Don Waldron*	470	50.2	N/A
Conservative	Lance Stanbury	420	44.8	+15.6
Conservative	Jordon Millward	378	40.3	+2.0
Turnout		937	24.4	
Registered electors		3,836		
WSI gain from Independent				
WSI gain from Independent				

=== Tollgate ===
Tollgate (2 seats)
Party	Candidate	Votes	%	±%
Labour	Diane Hind*	740	65.5	+22.9
Labour	Marilyn Sayer	701	62.0	N/A
Conservative	Mark Winter	354	31.3	–0.5
Conservative	Daniel Sillett	350	31.0	N/A
Turnout		1,130	27.1	
Registered electors		4,174		
Labour hold				
Labour gain from Independent				

=== Westgate ===
Westgate (2 seats)
Party	Candidate	Votes	%	±%
Conservative	John Augustine*	751	50.7	–13.6
Conservative	Richard Rout*	785	53.0	–5.3
Labour	Paul McGoochan	674	45.5	+7.4
Turnout		1,481	39.2	
Registered electors		3,782		
Conservative hold				
Conservative hold				

=== Whepstead & Wickhambrook ===
Whepstead & Wickhambrook
Party	Candidate	Votes	%	±%
Conservative	Sarah Pugh	516	67.5	–12.7
Labour	Robert Sanderson	248	32.5	+12.7
Majority		268	35.0	
Turnout		771	37.1	
Registered electors		2,077		
Conservative hold		Swing	▼12.6	

=== Withersfield ===
Withersfield
Party	Candidate	Votes	%	±%
Labour	Indy Wijenayaka	339	45.9	N/A
Conservative	Peter Stevens*	325	44.0	N/A
Independent	Peter Lord	75	10.1	N/A
Majority		14	1.9	N/A
Turnout		744	40.6	N/A
Registered electors		1,833		
Labour gain from Conservative		Swing	N/A	

== Changes 2023–2027 ==
=== Newmarket East ===
The by-election followed the resignation of Labour councillor Susan Perry.

Newmarket East by-election: 11 September 2025
Party	Candidate	Votes	%	±%
Reform	Adrian Whittle	343	29.7	N/A
Conservative	Robert Nobbs	288	25.0	+4.2
Liberal Democrats	Caroline Revitt	199	17.2	–3.1
Labour	Graham Creelman	176	15.3	–8.2
Green	Danny Kent	148	12.8	N/A
Majority		55	4.7	N/A
Turnout		1,155	28.6	+3.1
Registered electors		4,042		
Reform gain from Labour				

=== Abbeygate ===
The by-election followed the resignation of Conservative councillor Jo Rayner.

Abbeygate by-election: 7 May 2026
Party	Candidate	Votes	%	±%
Green	Dylan Roques	631	34.1	−20.6
Reform	Catherine Mustoe	367	19.8	N/A
Conservative	Aaron John	335	18.1	–21.4
Independent	Paul Hopfensperger	240	13.0	N/A
Labour	Michael Smith	201	10.9	−24.5
Liberal Democrats	Aiden Roe	75	4.1	N/A
Majority		264	14.3	N/A
Turnout		1,857	49.2	+9.2
Registered electors		3,771		
Green gain from Conservative				

=== Haverhill West ===
The by-election was called following the resignation of Conservative councillor Margaret Marks.

Haverhill West by-election: 10 September 2026
Party	Candidate	Votes	%	±%
Conservative	Graham Cone	530	51.3	+16.5
Reform	Heike Sowa	267	25.8	N/A
Labour	Quinn Cox	146	14.4	−23.4
Green	Clare Higson	60	5.8	N/A
Liberal Democrats	James Porter	30	2.9	N/A
Majority		263	25.5	N/A
Turnout		1033	24.5	−1.2
Conservative hold		Swing		
