= Brainpower (disambiguation) =

Brainpower is a Dutch musician.

Brainpower, BrainPower, or Brain Power may also refer to:

== Music ==
- "Brainpower" (song), a song by Freezepop
- "Brain Power", a song by Paul Engemann from the film Summer School

== Television ==
- "Brain Power", an episode of the television series Baby Felix
- "Brainpower", an episode of the television series Human Body: Pushing the Limits
- "Brain Power", an episode of the television series In Search of...
- "Brain Power", an episode of the television series The Human Body
- "Brain Power", an episode of the television series Zoboomafoo

== Other uses ==
- Brainpower, Inc., a faith-based organization in the Center for Bronx Non-Profits
- Brain Power, a video game for the console Watara Supervision
- Brain Power, a book following the animated television series Dexter's Laboratory

== See also ==
- Brain Powerd, a Japanese anime television series
