= Paul Hopfensperger =

English politician

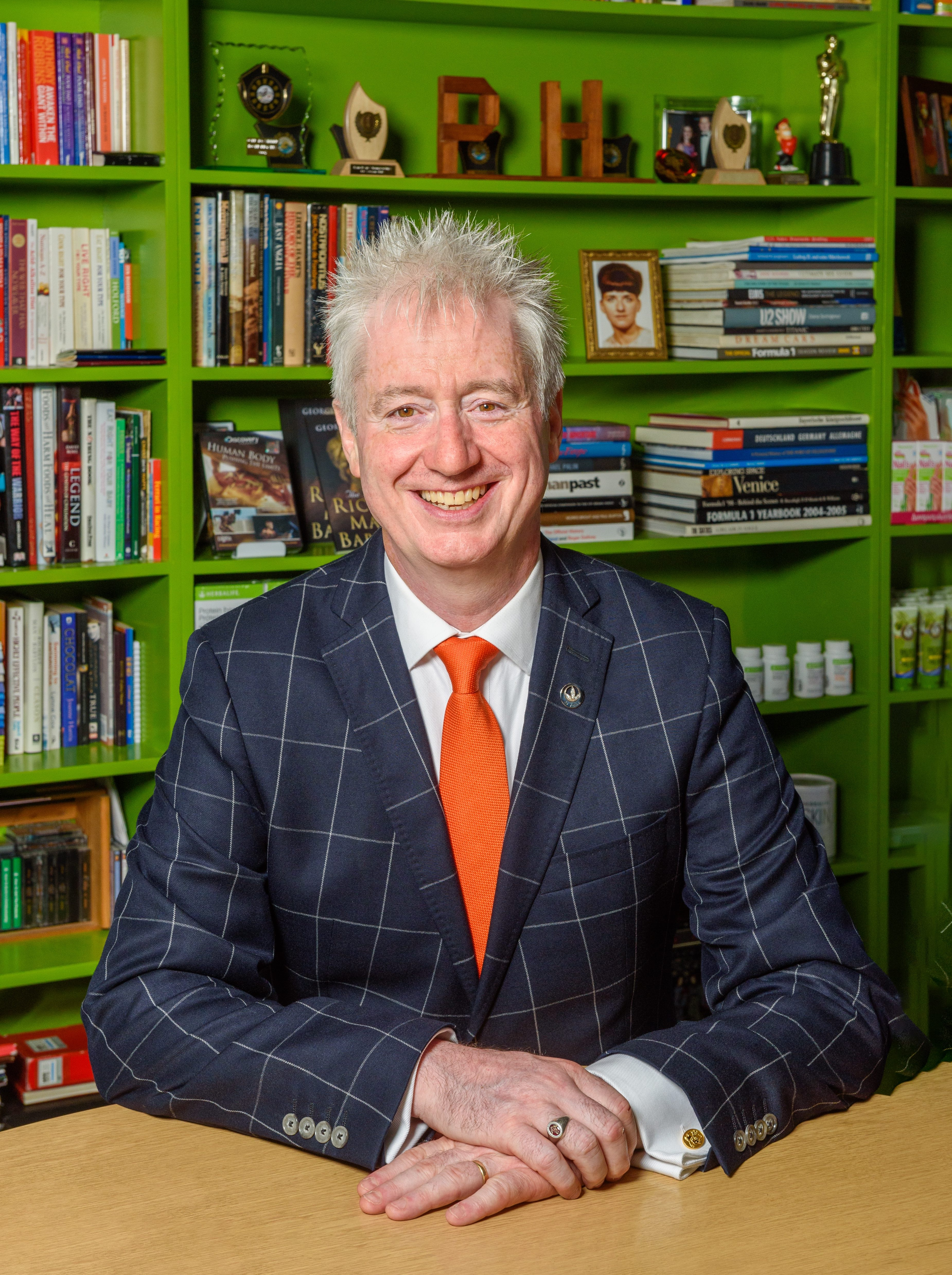
- Hopfensperger in 2020

Suffolk County Councillor for Tower Division
- In office 5 May 2005 – 4 June 2009
- Preceded by: New Seat
- Succeeded by: Mark Ereira-Guyer

West Suffolk District Councillor for St Olaves Ward
- In office 2 May 2019 – 4 May 2023
- Preceded by: New Seat
- Succeeded by: Frank Stennett

St Edmundsbury Borough Councillor for St Olaves Ward
- In office 5 May 2011 – 2 May 2019
- Preceded by: Mark Ereira-Guyer
- Succeeded by: Seat Abolished

Bury St Edmunds Town Councillor for St Olaves Ward
- In office 5 May 2016 – 4 May 2023
- Preceded by: Bob Cockle
- Succeeded by: Frank Stennett

Bury St Edmunds Town Councillor for Eastgate Ward
- In office 6 June 2003 – 6 June 2006
- Preceded by: New seat
- Succeeded by: Patricia Warby

Deputy Mayor of Bury St Edmunds
- In office 2019–2020
- In office 2005 – April 2006

Personal details
- Born: 27 March 1963 (age 63)
- Party: Independent (2008–present)
- Other political affiliations: Conservative (2003–2008)
- Spouse: Rebecca (Beccy)
- Education: The Cambridgeshire College of Arts and Technology (now Anglia Ruskin University)
- Occupation: Former engineer, now businessman, coach and public speaker
- Website: https://paulhopfensperger.com

Paul Hopfensperger (born 1963) is a British politician and open water swimmer. He is also an international best-selling author and musician, and singer-songwriter/guitarist with the British mod revival band The Teazers.

He served as the first Bury St. Edmunds Town Councillor for Eastgate Ward from 2003 to 2006, the first Suffolk County Councillor for Tower Division from 2005 to 2009, and as the first West Suffolk District Councillor for St Olaves Ward from 2019 to 2023. He was the deputy mayor of Bury St Edmunds from 2005 to 2006 and from 2019 to 2020.

Hopfensperger was a member of the Conservative Party until 2008, when he left the party and became an independent councillor over the administration's decision to close Middle schools in Bury St. Edmunds. In April 2026, he is standing as an independent candidate for the new Abbeygate & Minden Division at the 2026 Suffolk County Council election, and for Abbeygate Ward on the West Suffolk District Council by-election.

== Biography ==
Hopfensperger attended The Convent of St Louis, Moreton Hall Preparatory School and Culford School, all in Bury St Edmunds, Suffolk. He graduated from the Cambridge College of Arts and Technology (now Anglia Ruskin University) with a Higher National Diploma (HND) in Mechanical/Computer Aided Engineering. Since 2008, having retrained, he is now a Health Coach, Speaker and best-selling Author.

== Personal life ==
Hopfensperger is married to Rebecca (Beccy) who is currently a West Suffolk District and Suffolk County Council councillor and the former Mayor of Bury St Edmunds (2005–2006).

== Political career ==
Hopfensperger unsuccessfully stood for election to St Edmundsbury Borough Council in 1999 and 2003 (losing by just 5 votes) before being co-opted into the newly formed Bury St Edmunds Town Council at its second ever meeting in June 2003, and serving as deputy mayor from 2005 until his resignation in April 2006.

Hopfensperger was elected to the newly created Tower Division on Suffolk County Council in 2005 as a Conservative, serving as the Vice Chairman of the Roads and Transport Scrutiny Committee and Assistant to the Portfolio Holder for the London 2012 Olympic Games. However, in February 2008 he left the party over its policy to abolish the county's middle schools becoming an Independent Suffolk County councillor.

A month later he stood as an Independent candidate for a Bury St Edmunds Town Council by-election. During the election, an opposition candidate reported him to the police for posting "It looks like Paul Farmer has done well" on his blog after returning from the opening of the postal votes. For this he received a police caution under the Representation of the People Act due to a minor breach of the act relating to maintaining secrecy as ballot papers are counted.

Hopfensperger unsuccessfully ran as an Independent for re-election to Suffolk County Council in 2009 in Hardwick Division, a campaign smeared by the Lib-Dems who printed incorrect information on him on their election leaflet. However, he won a seat on St Edmundsbury Borough Council in 2011 which he held until he stood down to concentrate on his business commitments in 2023. By this time St Edmundsbury had merged with Forest Heath to become West Suffolk District Council.

Hopfensperger served as the St Edmundsbury Borough Council/West Suffolk Council representative on the Suffolk County Council Health Scrutiny Committee, with documented appointments for the 2015–2016, 2017–2018, and 2018–2019 periods. He was also elected as the substitute member for 2019–2020 and was recognised for his continued role.

In the 2017 general election he nominated to run for Parliament in the Bury St Edmunds constituency but he withdrew before the election for personal reasons. He did run in 2019 prioritising local issues, finishing 4th (of 4 candidates) in an election dominated by Brexit, with 2.7% of the vote.

=== Achievements ===
Over his twenty year period as a local councillor, Hopfensperger was involved in many improvements in the district wards and county council division he represented.

==== New Sports facilities ====
In 2015 Hopfensperger raised the issue of dog fouling on two local football pitches in Oakes Road and The Tollgate Recreation Ground/Northumberland Avenue Playing Field in Bury St Edmunds. With assistance from the Suffolk FA and fellow councillors, his campaign raised the £20,000 required for the fencing which led to the creation of two fenced in football facilities in these areas.

In a letter to the 'Bury Free Press' on 30 September 2016, Hopfensperger wrote in support of the previous week's letter from the Suffolk Police and Crime Commissioner Tim Passmore about Sport being key to fighting crime.

In the letter Hopfensperger outlines the availability of the two new football facilities in St Olaves Ward and the work being undertaken to setup youth football, the need to tackle obesity which is rife in the UK and the work being undertaken to build a new community centre. He quotes Chinese philosopher Lao Tzu; A journey of a thousand miles begins with a single step, and challenged people to take that first step.

==== New Community Centre ====
In December 2021, during the height of the COVID pandemic, the keys to a new multi-million pound, state-of-the-art community centre, which had been 10 years in the making were handed over to the new board of trustees. The project was led by the Newbury Community Association (NCA), of which Hopfensperger was a member as part of his role as a local councillor, in partnership with West Suffolk Council and Suffolk County Council.

=== Brexit ===
During a 2021 West Suffolk Council debate on exiting the European Union (Brexit), at which Hopfensperger declared a non-pecuniary interest as a small business owner who imports/exports to/from the EU, he explained that the new trading arrangements with the EU had severely hampered trade and placed extra burdens and costs on companies who now had to complete reams of paperwork. The new paperwork requirements to sell products abroad had meant hours of extra work, including for simply sending items to Northern Ireland which is part of the United Kingdom. This was affecting people's mental health and he questioned what help was available for business people to deal with the increased costs and burdens.

He criticised the post-Brexit trading arrangements as a "complete and utter disaster". He said, "If anyone tells me 'we knew what we were voting for' I say to them you certainly didn't know what you were voting for."

=== Electoral history ===
UK Parliament elections

Date of election	Constituency	Party	Votes	%	Result
2019	Bury St Edmunds	Independent	1,694	2.7	Not elected (4th)

Suffolk County Council elections

Date of election	Division	Party	Votes	%	Result
2005	Tower	Conservative	2,747	28.3	Elected
2009	Hardwick	Independent	824	28.8	Not elected (2nd)
2013	Hardwick	Independent	737	27.7	Not elected (2nd)
2017	Tower	Independent	1,623	20.3	Not elected (3rd)
2026	Abbeygate & Minden	Independent	442	14.8	Not Elected (5th)

Borough of St Edmundsbury and West Suffolk District Council elections

Date of election	Ward	Party	Votes	%	Result
1999	Risbygate	Conservative	442	39.7	Not elected (3rd)
2003	Southgate	Conservative	744	48.1	Not elected (2nd)
2011	St Olaves	Independent	421	33.6	Elected
2015	St Olaves	Independent	835	37.8	Elected
2019	St Olaves	Independent	680	50.9	Elected
2026	Abbeygate	Independent	240	14.0	Not Elected (4th)

Bury St Edmunds Town Council elections

Date of election	Ward	Party	Votes	%	Result
2003	Eastgate	Independent			Co-opted (voted in by members of the council)
2008	Abbeygate	Independent			Not elected (2nd)
2016	St Olaves	Independent	288	46.7	Elected
2019	St Olaves	Independent	712	53.3	Elected

== Swimming career ==
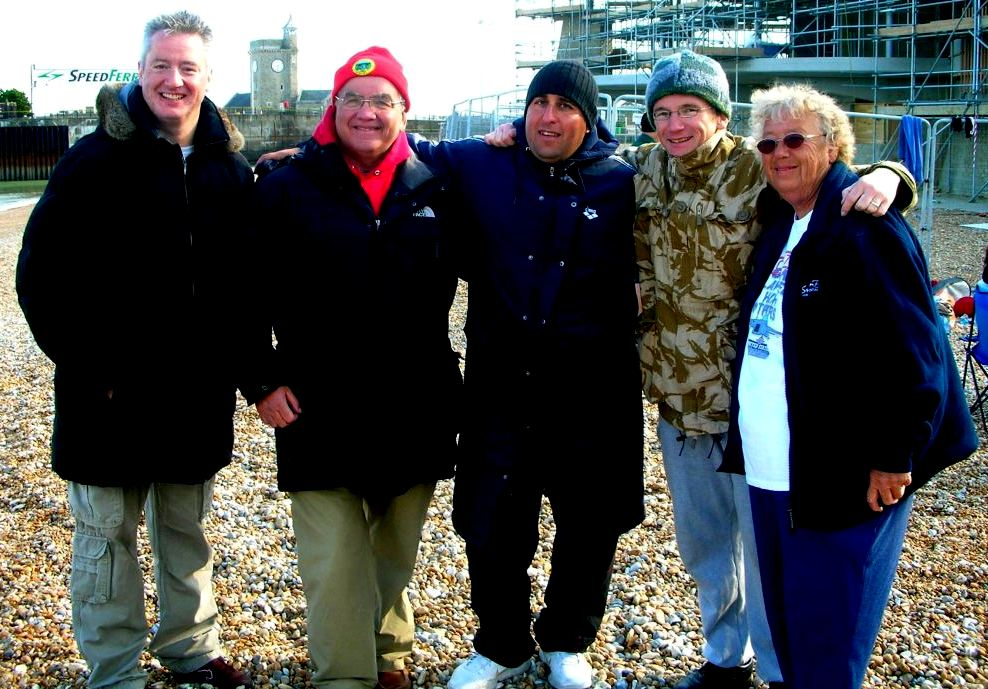
Left to Right: Paul Hopfensperger, 'King of The English Channel' Kevin Murphy, Keith Bartolo, Mark Blewitt, and 'The Channel General' Freda Streeter. Dover Harbour, England, Saturday 14 June 2008

During his youth, Hopfensperger was a competitive swimmer representing his home town of Bury St Edmunds and the county of Suffolk, including captaining the Bury St Edmunds Swimming Club ('The Bury Beavers') on three occasions between 1978 and 1981.

Hopfensperger has completed two solo crossings of the English Channel in 2007 and 2008, making him the 84th person in history to swim the channel more than once. He also participated in one relay in 2010 as part of the six person 'Team Iryna International English Channel Relay Team'.

Hopfensperger's first swim in 2007 was broadcast live from the English Channel by reporter Jon Wright for BBC Radio Suffolk. Updates were broadcast throughout the day for the duration of the 13-hour 52-minute swim. His swim was also featured in the second episode of the Discovery Channel documentary series Human Body: Pushing the Limits – "Strength". This episode was nominated for an Emmy at the 60th annual Academy of Television Arts & Sciences awards in 2008.

In 2008 Hopfensperger competed at two FINA Open Water Grand Prix, becoming oldest known person to represent Great Britain in the sport of open water swimming.

== Philanthropy ==
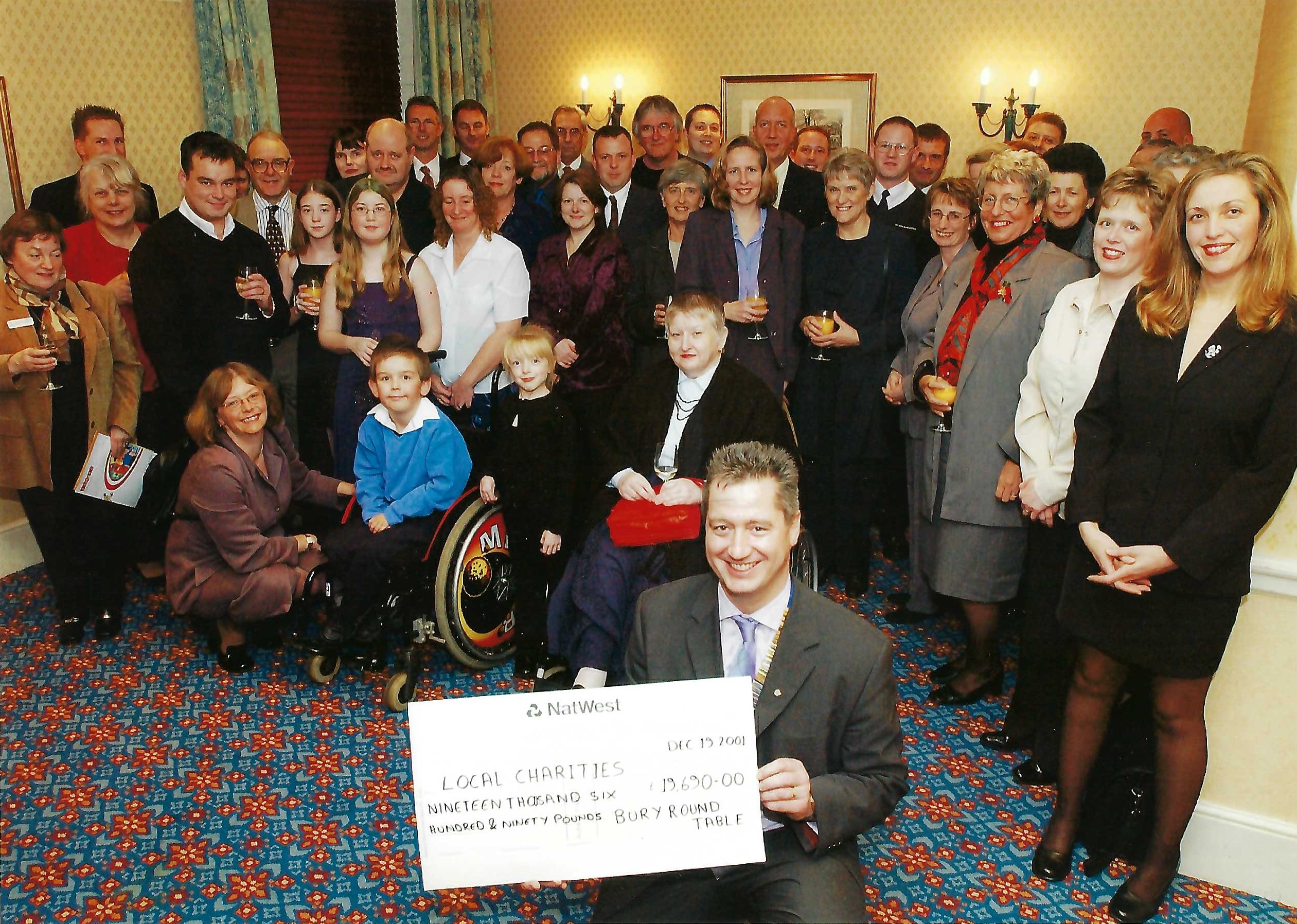
Bury St Edmunds Round Table 12 Days of Christmas Charity Event 2001

In 2001, Hopfensperger was elected to be the 51st Chairman of the Bury St Edmunds Round Table, an organisation specialising in raising funds for local charities.

On 19 December 2001, in his capacity as Chairman of Round Table, Hopfensperger, along with other members of the Round Table, presented a cheque for £19,690.00 to members of local Bury St. Edmunds based charities. The money had been raised from the organisation of a Hot Air Balloon Festival and the annual town fireworks display.

On 7 June 2002, Hopfensperger and his wife Beccy set off to complete a 5-day trek on the Great Wall of China, raising £3,000.00 for Whizz-Kidz Children's Wheelchair Charity. Despite badly spraining his ankle only a few minutes into the trek, Hopfensperger completed the task with the aid of two walking poles and having his ankle set on fire and massaged by a Chinese Doctor every evening.

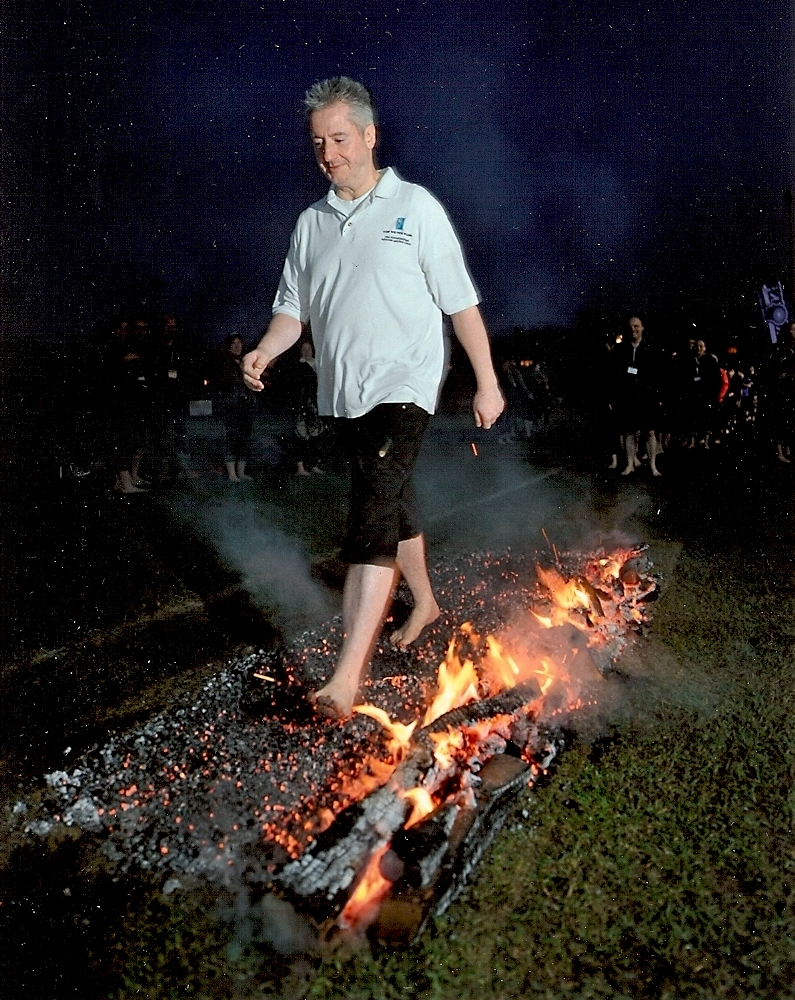
Paul Hopfensperger completes a firewalk to raise funds for The Stroke Association on 20 February 2011.

As of 25 January 2009, Hopfensperger's English Channel Swims swims raised a total of £16,156.13 for St Nicholas' Hospice in Bury St. Edmunds and CLIC Sargent Children's Cancer Charity.

On Sunday 20 February 2011, Hopfensperger achieved one of his long term goals by completeing two firewalks by walking barefoot on 533 degrees Celsius coals at the Bury St. Edmunds Rugby Club. The event was to raise funds for the UK charity The Stroke Association for which he raised £293 for the charity.

== Author and musician ==
During the COVID pandemic, Hopfensperger co-authored a book with various internationally renowned speakers including Kyle Wilson, Denis Waitley, Mitzi Perdue and Tom Ziglar titled Bringing Value, Solving Problems and Leaving a Legacy. Hopfensperger's chapter in the book, titled Just Keep Swimming Until You Get to France!™, details the mental attitude and philosophy gained from swimming The English Channel which he suggests can be used in all areas of life to become successful. The book became an International number one Amazon Bestseller.

In 2021, Hopfensperger, who has been in bands since the age of ten and is guitarist and singer-songwriter with the English mod band The Teazers, was part of an international collaboration of success minded individuals who featured on Roy Smoothe's 'smoothe mix' album titled Success Mindset Mix. This album also hit number one in five categories on the Amazon chart. His song titled Just Keep Swimming Until You Get To France!™ was also based on his experience of swimming The English Channel.

== Publications, Podcast and radio appearances ==
Hopfensperger also has been a guest on a number of radio shows and podcasts discussing politics, swimming the English Channel, music and personalised nutrition/personalized medicine.

=== Bibliography ===
==== Co-authored book ====
- Bringing Value, Solving Problems and Leaving a Legacy (with Kyle Wilson, Denis Waitley, Mitzi Perdue, Bob Burg, Tom Ziglar and others) (2021) Publisher: Kyle Wilson International. ISBN 9798513562870

=== Radio ===
- (UK) RWSfm 103.3 (5 December 2019). UK Election 2019 – The Interviews. Julie MacLeod interviews Paul Hopfensperger.

=== Podcast appearances ===
- (USA) Sean G Murphy's Daily Awakening Call (30 July 2020). "Episode 525. 3 x Channel Swimmer - Paul Hopfensperger" (Podcast).
- (USA) Dr. Amy Novotny (5 September 2020). "The Weekend Wellness Hour - Interview with Paul Hopfensperger about Personalised Nutrition and Swimming The English Channel" (Podcast).
- (USA) Victor Menasce (26 September 2020). "The Real Estate Espresso Podcast – Interview with Paul Hopfensperger about swimming The English Channel" (Podcast).
- (USA) Jo Hausman (22 October 2020). "Go For It! - Just Keep Swimming Until You Get to France!" (Podcast).
- (USA) Pancham Gupta (27 September 2021). "The Gold Collar Investor Podcast - 3x Crossing English Channel! The story of grit and mindset!" (Podcast).

=== Facebook Live ===
- "(USA) Larry Thompson's 'The Millionaire Training Book Club'. Larry and Taylor Thompson interview Paul Hopfensperger". 22 January 2021.

=== Publications ===
- (AUS) Kloeden CN, McLean AJ (15 August 1995). "Alcohol, Drugs and Traffice Safety-T'95, volumes 1 and 2 (ICADTS). Vol 1 - Page 475, Paul J Hopfensperger - Automating Drink/Drive Procedures to Reduce Police Time and Eliminate Errors". Adelaide: NHMRC Road Accident Research Unit.
- (UK) Opuko, Benjamin (19 March 2024). "Executive Interview with Paul Hopfensperger, founder of Body and Mind Studio International". XRP Healthcare.

== Television ==
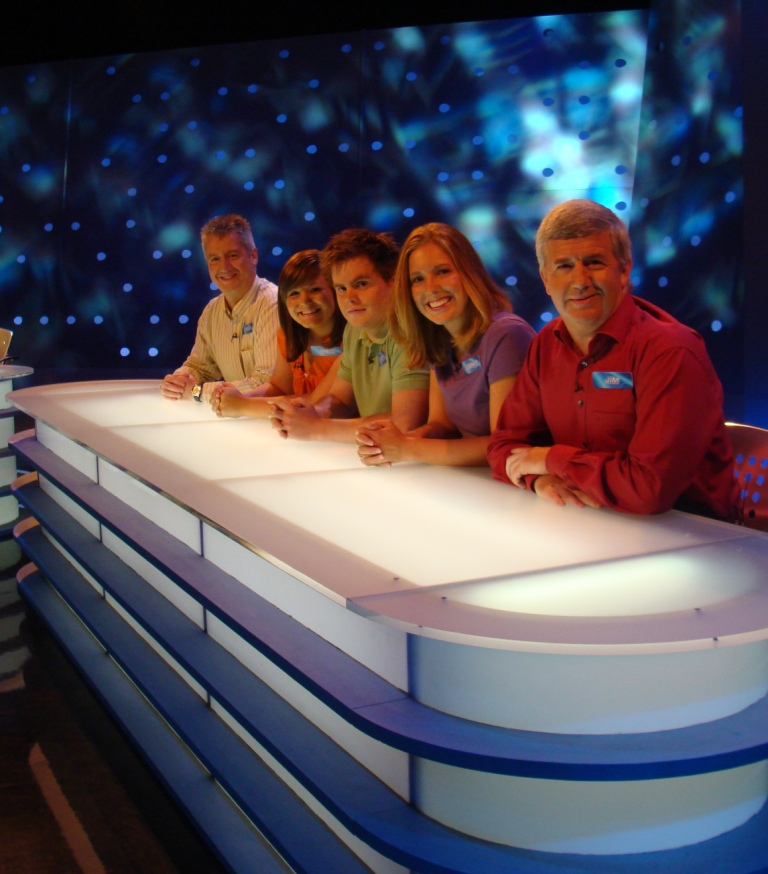
Hopfensperger (far left) on Eggheads

In 2010 Hopfensperger appeared on the TV quiz show Eggheads where he captained a team of six English Channel swimmers called "Channel Buoys and Gulls". The team included 'King of The English Channel' swimmer Kevin Murphy.

Year	Title	Role	Notes
1978	Home in England	Himself – Working in his father's shop	30 Minute BBC Documentary featuring his late Father Johann Hopfensperger
2008	Human Body: Pushing the Limits	Himself – English Channel Swimmer	Episode 1: "Strength"
2010	Eggheads (game show)	Himself – Captain of an English Channel Swimmers team.	Series 11, Episode 73, 'Channel Buoys and Gulls'

== Awards and nominations ==
Association	Year	Category	Result	Ref.
The Excellence Awards	2026	Goal Setting Speaker of The Year	Won	
