= 2005 Suffolk County Council election =

2005 UK local government election

- 5 May 2005

All 75 seats in the Suffolk County Council 38 seats needed for a majority

	First party	Second party	Third party
Leader	Jeremy Pembroke	Bryony Rudkin	Peter Monk
Party	Conservative	Labour	Liberal Democrats
Leader since	2002	May 2003	May 2000
Leader's seat	Cosford	Bridge	Wilford
Last election	31 seats, 42.0%	36 seats, 34.3%	12 seats, 21.7%
Seats before	30	34	13
Seats won	45	22	7
Seat change	▲15	▼12	▼6
Popular vote	131,719	93,370	88,238
Percentage	39.2%	27.8%	26.3%
Swing	▼2.8%	▼6.5%	▲4.6%
	Fourth party
Party	Independent
Last election	1 seats, 1.5%
Seats before	3
Seats won	1
Seat change	▼2
Popular vote	9,491
Percentage	2.9%
Swing	▲1.3%
- Map of the 2005 Suffolk County Council Election result.
Council control before election
No overall control
Council control after election
Conservative

Elections to Suffolk County Council were held on 5 May 2005. The whole council was up for election with boundary changes since the last election in 2001 reducing the number of seats by 5. The Conservative Party gained control of the council from no overall control.

All locally registered electors (British, Irish, Commonwealth and European Union citizens) who were aged 18 or over on Thursday 4 May 2005 were entitled to vote in the local elections. Those who were temporarily away from their ordinary address (for example, away working, on holiday, in student accommodation or in hospital) were also entitled to vote in the local elections, although those who had moved abroad and registered as overseas electors cannot vote in the local elections. It is possible to register to vote at more than one address (such as a university student who had a term-time address and lives at home during holidays) at the discretion of the local Electoral Register Office, but it remains an offence to vote more than once in the same local government election.

== Summary ==
The ruling Labour-Liberal Democrat coalition had become increasingly unpopular following a number of significant council tax rises. The opposition Conservatives were successful in highlighting this to their benefit.

Both the Liberal Democrats and Labour endured heavy losses to the Conservatives in rural areas, but they performed better in urban Suffolk. The Conservatives failed to gain a single seat in Ipswich and Lowestoft, for example.

== Government formation ==
With a seven-seat majority, Conservative group leader Jeremy Pembroke (Cosford) became the new council leader. Outgoing council leader Bryony Rudkin (Bridge) remained as Labour group leader and Kathy Pollard (Belstead Brook) became Lib Dem group leader.

== Election result ==
2005 Suffolk local election result
Party	Seats	Gains	Losses	Net gain/loss	Seats %	Votes %	Votes	+/−
Conservative	45	16	1	+15	60.0	39.2	131,719	−2.8
Labour	22	1	13	−12	29.3	27.8	93,370	−6.5
Liberal Democrats	7	0	6	−6	9.3	26.3	88,238	+4.6
Independent	1	0	2	−2	1.3	2.9	9,491	+1.3
Green	0	0	0	0	0.0	2.2	7,454	+1.9
UKIP	0	0	0	0	0.0	1.6	5,304	+1.5
West Suffolk Independent	0	0	0	0	0.0	0.1	466	+0.1

== Results by district ==
- Councillor's names in bold were elected.

=== Babergh ===
District summary

Party	Seats	+/-	Votes	%	+/-
Conservative	5	▲2	16,917	36.4	−1.0
Liberal Democrat	3	▼1	14,804	31.8	−3.0
Labour	1	▼1	11,062	23.8	+6.3
Independent	1	Steady	2,908	6.3	−3.0
UKIP	0	Steady	808	1.7	+1.7

Division results

Belstead Brook
Party	Candidate	Votes	%	±%
**Liberal Democrats**	**Anne Pollard ***	**1,875**	**43.8**	**−18.2**
Conservative	John Browne Cave	1,497	35.0	−3.0
Labour	Janet Norden	909	21.2	+21.2
Majority		378	8.8	−15.2
Turnout		4,281	64.3	+2.7
Liberal Democrats **hold**		Swing	−7.6	

Cosford
Party	Candidate	Votes	%	±%
**Conservative**	**Jeremy Pembroke ***	**2,475**	**50.6**	**−0.7**
Liberal Democrats	Mary Munson	1,422	29.1	−19.6
Labour	Roland Bee	996	20.4	+20.4
Majority		1,053	21.5	+18.9
Turnout		4,893	73.0	+1.7
Conservative **hold**		Swing	+9.5	

Great Cornard
Party	Candidate	Votes	%	±%
**Conservative**	**Peter Beer**	**1,470**	**40.2**	**−1.6**
Labour	Wil Gibson *	1,268	34.7	−23.5
Liberal Democrats	Marion Press	921	25.2	+25.2
Majority		202	5.5	−10.9
Turnout		3,659	60.6	+2.3
Conservative **gain** from Labour		Swing	+11.0	

Hadleigh
Party	Candidate	Votes	%	±%
**Liberal Democrats**	**David Grutchfield ***	**1,894**	**46.2**	**+4.0**
Labour	James Quinlan	1,209	29.5	+0.8
Conservative	Carey Fraulo	839	20.4	+1.2
UKIP	Roy O'Shaughnessy	162	4.0	+4.0
Majority		685	16.7	+3.3
Turnout		4,104	66.9	+2.6
Liberal Democrats **hold**		Swing	+1.6	

Melford
Party	Candidate	Votes	%	±%
**Independent**	**Richard Kemp ***	**2,601**	**49.5**	**−19.3**
Conservative	David Burch	1,644	31.3	+0.0
Labour	Mischa Wilson	1,013	19.3	+19.3
Majority		957	18.2	−19.3
Turnout		5,258	69.2	+6.2
Independent **hold**		Swing	−9.7	

Peninsula
Party	Candidate	Votes	%	±%
**Liberal Democrats**	**David Wood ***	**2,792**	**48.9**	**−11.6**
Conservative	Yvonne Chartier	1,847	32.3	+4.2
Labour	Keith Rawlings	1,074	18.8	+18.8
Majority		945	16.5	−15.8
Turnout		5,713	73.2	+4.1
Liberal Democrats **hold**		Swing	−7.9	

Samford
Party	Candidate	Votes	%	±%
**Conservative**	**William Yorke-Edwards**	**2,362**	**39.9**	**+2.6**
Liberal Democrats	Laurie Mayer	2,175	36.7	−0.9
Labour	Cameron Scott	1,058	17.9	−7.2
UKIP	John Smith	330	5.6	+5.6
Majority		187	3.2	+2.9
Turnout		5,925	76.8	+5.1
Conservative **gain** from Liberal Democrats		Swing	+1.8	

Stour Valley
Party	Candidate	Votes	%	±%
**Conservative**	**Selwyn Pryor ***	**2,131**	**46.5**	**−4.5**
Liberal Democrats	Bryn Hurren	1,699	37.1	+11.9
Labour	Emma Bishton	756	16.5	−7.4
Majority		432	9.4	−16.4
Turnout		4,586	74.7	+6.5
Conservative **hold**		Swing	−8.2	

Sudbury
Party	Candidate	Votes	%	±%
**Labour**	**Jack Owen**	**1,383**	**35.9**	**−2.2**
Liberal Democrats	Richard Platt	1,146	29.7	+1.8
Conservative	Raymond Smith	1,019	26.4	−1.5
Independent	Errol Newman	307	8.0	+1.9
Majority		237	5.6	−4.5
Turnout		3,855	65.2	+7.3
Labour **hold**		Swing	−2.0	

Sudbury East and Waldingfield
Party	Candidate	Votes	%
**Conservative**	**Colin Spence**	**1,633**	**38.7**
Labour	Nicholas Irwin *	1,396	33.0
Liberal Democrats	Andrew Welsh	880	20.8
UKIP	Leon Stedman	316	7.5
Majority		237	5.6
Turnout		4,225	65.2
Conservative **win** (new seat)			

=== Forest Heath ===
District summary

Party	Seats	+/-	Votes	%	+/-
Conservative	5	▼1	8,693	43.1	−16.7
Labour	0	Steady	4,993	24.8	−15.4
Liberal Democrat	0	Steady	3,233	16.0	+16.0
Independent	0	Steady	1,466	7.3	+7.3
UKIP	0	Steady	1,309	6.5	+6.5
West Suffolk Independents	0	Steady	466	2.3	+2.3

Division results

Brandon
Party	Candidate	Votes	%	±%
**Conservative**	**William Bishop ***	**1,895**	**53.3**	**−8.0**
Labour	Pamela Brown	964	27.1	−11.6
Liberal Democrats	Catriona Pilborough	464	13.1	+13.1
UKIP	John French	233	6.6	+6.6
Majority		931	26.2	+3.6
Turnout		3,556	55.0	−0.6
Conservative **hold**		Swing	+1.8	

Exning and Newmarket
Party	Candidate	Votes	%
**Conservative**	**Bill Sadler ***	**1,740**	**37.2**
Labour	Peter Dwane	1,243	26.5
Liberal Democrats	Ian Radford	743	15.9
West Suffolk Independent	Terence Mills	466	10.0
Independent	Don Levick	263	5.6
UKIP	David Hudson	229	4.9
Majority		497	10.6
Turnout		4,684	55.1
Conservative **win** (new seat)			

Mildenhall
Party	Candidate	Votes	%	±%
**Conservative**	**Paul Pendleton ***	**1,638**	**43.1**	**−10.9**
Labour	David Bowman	910	23.9	−22.1
Independent	Stephen Gunn	536	14.1	+14.1
Liberal Democrats	Eleanor Minshall	507	13.3	+13.3
UKIP	Bert Hitt	210	5.5	+5.5
Majority		728	19.2	+11.2
Turnout		3,801	58.5	+3.3
Conservative **hold**		Swing	+5.6	

Newmarket and Red Lodge
Party	Candidate	Votes	%
**Conservative**	**Lisa Chambers**	**1,582**	**43.7**
Liberal Democrats	Jane Andrews-Smith	932	25.8
Labour	Joy Uney	883	24.4
UKIP	David Whitear	220	6.1
Majority		650	18.0
Turnout		3,617	57.2
Conservative **win** (new seat)			

Row Heath
Party	Candidate	Votes	%	±%
**Conservative**	**Matthew Edwards**	**1,838**	**40.8**	**−28.8**
Labour	Cyril Brown	993	22.1	−8.3
Independent	Robert Newman	667	14.8	+14.8
Liberal Democrats	Timothy Huggan	587	13.0	+13.0
UKIP	Ian Smith	417	9.3	+9.3
Majority		845	18.8	−20.4
Turnout		4,502	61.5	+5.0
Conservative **hold**		Swing	−10.2	

=== Ipswich ===
District summary

Party	Seats	+/-	Votes	%	+/-
Labour	10	▼5	31,018	40.4	−9.1
Liberal Democrat	2	▲2	19,943	26.0	+9.1
Conservative	1	Steady	25,731	33.6	+0.0

Division results

Bixley
Party	Candidate	Votes	%	±%
**Conservative**	**Russell Harsant ***	**1,972**	**48.8**	**+0.2**
Labour	Martyn Green	1,051	26.0	−4.0
Liberal Democrats	Gareth Jones	1,022	25.3	+3.8
Majority		921	22.8	+4.2
Turnout		4,045	70.6	+4.3
Conservative **hold**		Swing	+2.1	

Bridge
Party	Candidate	Votes	%	±%
**Labour**	**Harold Mangar ***	**1,567**	**47.8**	**−9.6**
Conservative	Nadia Cenci	1,014	30.9	+6.6
Liberal Democrats	Philip Richardson	698	21.3	+3.1
Majority		553	16.9	−16.1
Turnout		3,279	53.1	+1.8
Labour **hold**		Swing	−8.1	

Chantry (2 Seats)
Party	Candidate	Votes	%	±%
**Labour**	**Keith Rawlingson ***	**4,413**	**47.8**	**−11.8**
**Labour**	**Bryony Rudkin ***	**3,927**		
Conservative	Robert Hall	3,046	33.0	+7.4
Conservative	Kathleen Kenna	2,750		
Liberal Democrats	Oliver Holmes	1,778	19.3	+4.4
Liberal Democrats	John Whitear	1,450		
Majority		1,367	14.8	−19.2
Turnout		9,237	57.6	+4.7
Labour **hold**		Swing	−9.6	
Labour **win** (new seat)				

Gainsborough
Party	Candidate	Votes	%	±%
**Labour**	**Bill Quinton ***	**2,225**	**48.2**	**−12.4**
Conservative	Janet Sibley *	1,533	33.2	+7.8
Liberal Democrats	Robert Chambers	856	18.6	+4.6
Majority		692	15.0	−20.2
Turnout		4,614	58.2	+6.0
Labour **hold**		Swing	−10.1	

Priory Heath
Party	Candidate	Votes	%	±%
**Labour**	**Susan Maguire**	**1,593**	**51.7**	**−2.8**
Conservative	David Brown	865	28.1	−0.6
Liberal Democrats	Catherine Stafford	624	20.3	+3.4
Majority		728	23.6	−2.2
Turnout		3,082	55.2	+1.1
Labour **hold**		Swing	−1.1	

Rushmere
Party	Candidate	Votes	%	±%
**Labour**	**Susan Thomas ***	**1,869**	**40.4**	**−6.8**
Conservative	Eileen Smith	1,649	35.7	+1.4
Liberal Democrats	Cathy French	1,107	23.9	−5.4
Majority		220	4.8	−8.1
Turnout		4,625	66.3	+4.2
Labour **hold**		Swing	−4.1	

St Helen's
Party	Candidate	Votes	%
**Labour**	**Kevan Lim ***	**1,485**	**39.2**
Liberal Democrats	Philip Green	1,302	34.4
Conservative	Elizabeth Harsant	1,001	26.4
Majority		183	4.8
Turnout		3,788	58.7
Labour **win** (new seat)			

St John's
Party	Candidate	Votes	%	±%
**Labour Co-op**	**Sandy Martin ***	**1,721**	**43.3**	**−7.1**
Conservative	John Carnell	1,238	31.2	+0.1
Liberal Democrats	Bob Zablok	1,013	25.5	+7.0
Majority		483	12.2	−7.2
Turnout		3,972	64.0	+4.0
Labour Co-op **hold**		Swing	−3.6	

St. Margaret's and Westgate (2 Seats)
Party	Candidate	Votes	%
**Liberal Democrats**	**Andrew Cann**	**3,301**	**39.6**
**Liberal Democrats**	**Inga Lockington ***	**3,181**	
Conservative	Julia Schubert	2,684	32.2
Conservative	Priscilla Steed	2,681	
Labour	Keith Herod	2,352	28.2
Labour	Noel Tostevin	1,914	
Majority		617	7.4
Turnout		8,337	62.5
Liberal Democrats **win** (new seat)			
Liberal Democrats **win** (new seat)			

Whitehouse & Whitton (2 Seats)
Party	Candidate	Votes	%
**Labour**	**Anthony Lewis ***	**3,513**	**42.6**
**Labour**	**Graham Manuel ***	**3,388**	
Conservative	David Goldsmith	2,759	33.4
Conservative	Steven Wells	2,539	
Liberal Democrats	George King	1,980	24.0
Liberal Democrats	Stephen Williams	1,631	
Majority		754	9.1
Turnout		8,252	57.7
Labour **win** (new seat)			
Labour **win** (new seat)			

=== Mid Suffolk ===
District summary

Party	Seats	+/-	Votes	%	+/-
Conservative	8	▲3	20,877	43.2	−2.5
Liberal Democrat	2	▼1	13,822	28.6	−3.3
Labour	0	▼2	9,699	20.1	−2.3
Green	0	Steady	2,838	5.9	+5.9
Independent	0	Steady	1,076	2.2	+2.2

Division results

Bosmere
Party	Candidate	Votes	%	±%
**Liberal Democrats**	**Julia Truelove**	**1,640**	**33.1**	**−14.2**
Conservative	John Pratt	1,453	29.4	−4.4
Labour	James Higgins	779	15.7	−3.1
Independent	Michael Turner	648	13.1	+13.1
Independent	Ian Mason	428	8.7	+8.7
Majority		187	3.7	−9.9
Turnout		4,948	68.5	+4.2
Liberal Democrats **hold**		Swing	−4.9	

Gipping Valley
Party	Candidate	Votes	%	±%
**Liberal Democrats**	**John Field ***	**2,028**	**45.4**	**−10.4**
Conservative	Michael Damant	1,533	34.3	−9.9
Labour	Neil Curno	907	20.3	+20.3
Majority		495	11.1	−0.4
Turnout		4,468	67.0	+4.2
Liberal Democrats **hold**		Swing	−0.2	

Hartismere
Party	Candidate	Votes	%	±%
**Conservative**	**Charles Michell ***	**2,627**	**54.2**	**−5.3**
Liberal Democrats	Richard Flower	1,147	23.7	−16.9
Labour	Elaine Halton	1,076	22.2	+22.2
Majority		1,480	30.5	+11.7
Turnout		4,850	70.0	+4.3
Conservative **hold**		Swing	+5.8	

Hoxne and Eye
Party	Candidate	Votes	%	±%
**Conservative**	**Guy McGregor ***	**2,525**	**50.4**	
Liberal Democrats	Colin Hammond	1,384	27.6	
Labour	Christopher Soule	1,104	22.0	
Majority		1,141	22.8	
Turnout		5,013	71.8	
Conservative **win** (new seat)				

Stowmarket North and Stowupland
Party	Candidate	Votes	%
**Conservative**	**Eleanor Ramsey**	**1,743**	**39.5**
Labour	Duncan Macpherson *	1,468	33.3
Liberal Democrats	Colin Groundsell	804	18.2
Green	John Matthissen	400	9.1
Majority		275	6.2
Turnout		4,415	64.7
Conservative **win** (new seat)			

Stowmarket South
Party	Candidate	Votes	%
**Conservative**	**Keith Myers-Hewitt**	**1,576**	**34.1**
Labour	Ronald Snell *	1,446	31.3
Liberal Democrats	Keith Scarff	1,036	22.4
Green	Brenda Davis	563	12.2
Majority		130	2.8
Turnout		4,621	63.4
Conservative **win** (new seat)			

Thedwastre North
Party	Candidate	Votes	%	±%
**Conservative**	**Jane Storey ***	**2,365**	**47.1**	**−2.6**
Liberal Democrats	Carol Milward	1,708	34.0	+13.2
Labour	Sally Spore	945	18.8	−10.5
Majority		657	13.1	−7.3
Turnout		5,018	69.6	+0.9
Conservative **hold**		Swing	−7.9	

Thedwastre South
Party	Candidate	Votes	%	±%
**Conservative**	**Susan Lockett**	**2,247**	**46.9**	**+7.5**
Liberal Democrats	Penny Otton	1,644	34.3	−4.2
Labour	Suzanne Britton	898	18.8	−3.2
Majority		603	12.6	+11.7
Turnout		4,789	72.4	+5.5
Conservative **hold**		Swing	+5.8	

Thredling
Party	Candidate	Votes	%	±%
**Conservative**	**Eddy Alcock**	**2,596**	**51.6**	**+2.8**
Liberal Democrats	Helen Whitworth *	2,431	48.4	−2.8
Majority		5,027	3.3	+1.1
Turnout		5,027	71.7	+2.8
Conservative **gain** from Liberal Democrats		Swing	+2.8	

Upper Gipping
Party	Candidate	Votes	%	±%
**Conservative**	**Jeremy Clover ***	**2,212**	**42.8**	**−8.7**
Green	Andrew Stringer	1,875	36.3	+36.3
Labour	Marion Ravenhill	1,076	20.8	−27.6
Majority		337	6.5	+3.3
Turnout		5,163	72.3	+4.4
Conservative **hold**		Swing	−22.5	

=== Suffolk Coastal ===
District summary

Party	Seats	+/-	Votes	%	+/-
Conservative	13	▲6	34,262	44.5	−1.0
Liberal Democrat	0	▼3	26,065	33.8	+3.3
Labour	0	▼3	16,185	21.0	−1.4
Independent	0	Steady	508	0.7	+0.7

Division results

Aldeburgh and Leiston
Party	Candidate	Votes	%
**Conservative**	**Ronald Ward ***	**2,091**	**41.1**
Labour	Joan Girling *	1,671	32.9
Liberal Democrats	Lisabeth Hoad	1,325	26.1
Majority		420	8.2
Turnout		5,087	56.0
Conservative **win** (new seat)			

Blything
Party	Candidate	Votes	%	±%
**Conservative**	**Raeburn Leighton ***	**1,807**	**38.1**	**−14.5**
Liberal Democrats	John Slater	1,539	32.4	−15.0
Labour	David Jeremy	892	18.8	+18.8
Independent	Donald Tricker	508	10.7	+10.7
Majority		268	5.7	+0.6
Turnout		4,746	60.7	−7.8
Conservative **hold**		Swing	+0.3	

Carlford
Party	Candidate	Votes	%	±%
**Conservative**	**Peter Bellfield**	**2,828**	**55.8**	**+2.3**
Liberal Democrats	Anthony Barrett	1,324	26.1	−20.4
Labour	Stephen Connelly	916	18.1	+18.1
Majority		1,504	29.7	+22.8
Turnout		5,068	72.6	+5.6
Conservative **hold**		Swing	+11.4	

Felixstowe Coastal (2 Seats)
Party	Candidate	Votes	%
**Conservative**	**Ann Rodwell ***	**3,757**	**38.8**
**Conservative**	**Graham Newman**	**3,714**	
Liberal Democrats	Dot Paddick	3,226	33.3
Liberal Democrats	Michael Ninnmey	3,087	
Labour	Mark Campbell	2,692	27.8
Majority		531	5.5
Turnout		9,675	63.4
Conservative **win** (new seat)			
Conservative **win** (new seat)			

Felixstowe North and Trimley
Party	Candidate	Votes	%
**Conservative**	**John Goodwin**	**1,960**	**38.8**
Labour	David Rowe *	1,754	34.7
Liberal Democrats	Robert Sherratt	1,339	26.5
Majority		206	4.1
Turnout		5,053	64.1
Conservative **win** (new seat)			

Framlingham
Party	Candidate	Votes	%	±%
**Conservative**	**Colin Hart**	**2,355**	**48.8**	**−0.4**
Liberal Democrats	Andrew Houseley	1,645	34.1	−16.8
Labour	Edna Salmon	827	17.1	+17.1
Majority		710	14.7	+13.0
Turnout		4,827	68.9	+0.8
Conservative **gain** from Liberal Democrats		Swing	+8.2	

Kesgrave and Rushmere St. Andrew (2 Seats)
Party	Candidate	Votes	%
**Conservative**	**John Klaschka**	**3,567**	**41.3**
**Conservative**	**Steven Hudson ***	**3,547**	
Liberal Democrats	John Briggs	2,731	31.6
Labour	Nikki Goodchild	2,343	27.1
Liberal Democrats	Ronald Else	2,055	
Labour	Stanley Robinson	1,936	
Majority		836	9.7
Turnout		8,641	65.5
Conservative **win** (new seat)			
Conservative **win** (new seat)			

Martlesham
Party	Candidate	Votes	%
**Conservative**	**Patricia O'Brien ***	**2,622**	**43.1**
Liberal Democrats	John Kelso *	2,359	38.7
Labour	Thomas Guest	1,109	18.2
Majority		263	4.3
Turnout		6,090	70.3
Conservative **win** (new seat)			

Wickham
Party	Candidate	Votes	%	±%
**Conservative**	**Clare Aitchison**	**2,123**	**43.6**	**−0.8**
Liberal Democrats	Barry Halliday	1,590	32.6	+1.5
Labour	Valerie Pizzey	1,161	23.8	−1.3
Majority		533	10.9	−1.6
Turnout		4,874	65.6	−2.5
Conservative **hold**		Swing	−0.8	

Wilford
Party	Candidate	Votes	%	±%
**Conservative**	**Rosemary Clarke**	**2,171**	**50.3**	**+2.9**
Liberal Democrats	Peter Monk *	2,147	49.7	−2.9
Majority		24	0.6	−4.6
Turnout		4,318	67.8	+4.5
Conservative **gain** from Liberal Democrats		Swing	+2.9	

Woodbridge
Party	Candidate	Votes	%	±%
**Conservative**	**Benjamin Redsell ***	**1,720**	**40.0**	**+0.5**
Liberal Democrats	Diana Ball	1,698	39.5	+11.1
Labour	Roy Burgon	884	20.6	−6.5
Majority		22	0.5	−10.6
Turnout		4,302	66.8	−1.3
Conservative **hold**		Swing	−5.3	

=== St. Edmundsbury ===
District summary

Party	Seats	+/-	Votes	%	+/-
Conservative	9	▲4	25,919	40.8	−4.2
Labour	2	▼3	16,079	25.3	−15.0
Liberal Democrat	0	▼1	14,064	22.1	+10.3
UKIP	0	Steady	4,013	6.3	+5.8
Independent	0	Steady	2,602	4.1	+2.8
Green	0	Steady	887	1.4	+1.4

Division results

Blackbourn
Party	Candidate	Votes	%	±%
**Conservative**	**Joanna Spicer ***	**2,902**	**56.0**	**−8.2**
Labour	Alison Fairgrieve	1,132	21.8	−14.0
Liberal Democrats	Margaret Fossati	878	16.9	+16.9
UKIP	Philip Huckett	273	5.3	+5.3
Majority		1,770	34.2	+5.9
Turnout		5,185	77.2	+12.4
Conservative **hold**		Swing	+2.9	

Clare
Party	Candidate	Votes	%	±%
**Conservative**	**Jane Midwood**	**3,019**	**52.0**	**+2.6**
Liberal Democrats	Leslie Warmington *	2,295	39.6	−11.0
UKIP	James Lumley	489	8.4	+8.4
Majority		724	12.5	+11.3
Turnout		5,803	77.9	+11.6
Conservative **gain** from Liberal Democrats		Swing	+6.8	

Eastgate and Moreton Hall
Party	Candidate	Votes	%
**Conservative**	**Frank Warby**	**1,539**	**39.4**
Independent	Trevor Beckwith *	1,305	33.4
Liberal Democrats	David Bradbury	897	23.0
UKIP	Christopher Kisko	166	4.3
Majority		234	6.0
Turnout		3,907	72.0
Conservative **win** (new seat)			

Hardwick
Party	Candidate	Votes	%	±%
**Conservative**	**Stefan Oliver ***	**1,827**	**39.1**	
Liberal Democrats	Allan Jones	1,362	29.1	
Labour	Robert Corfe	1,174	25.1	
UKIP	Michael Brundle	312	6.7	
Majority		465	9.9	
Turnout		4,675	80.7	
Conservative **win** (new seat)				

Haverhill Cangle (2 Seats)
Party	Candidate	Votes	%
**Labour**	**Phillip French**	**2,411**	**37.1**
**Conservative**	**Tim Marks**	**2,395**	**36.9**
Conservative	Jeremy Farthing	2,348	
Labour	Ann Thomas	2,145	
Liberal Democrats	Mick Graham	1,328	20.4
Liberal Democrats	Lesley Robinson	1,198	
UKIP	Derek Gregory	366	5.6
UKIP	Frederick Rapsey	317	
Majority		16	0.2
Turnout		6,500	59.9
Labour **win** (new seat)			
Conservative **win** (new seat)			

Haverhill East and Kedington
Party	Candidate	Votes	%
**Conservative**	**Karen Knight**	**1,370**	**35.6**
Labour	Daniel Summers	1,190	31.0
Liberal Democrats	Terry McNally	1,080	28.1
UKIP	Tracy Lumley	205	5.3
Majority		180	4.7
Turnout		3,845	62.2
Conservative **win** (new seat)			

Thingoe North
Party	Candidate	Votes	%	±%
**Conservative**	**Beccy Hopfensperger**	**2,538**	**51.8**	**−0.7**
Liberal Democrats	Christopher Tidman	1,076	22.0	+1.9
Labour	David Dawson	1,038	21.2	−6.2
UKIP	Maureen Chessell	248	5.1	+5.1
Majority		1,462	29.8	+4.7
Turnout		4,900	79.0	+11.0
Conservative **hold**		Swing	−1.3	

Thingoe South
Party	Candidate	Votes	%	±%
**Conservative**	**Terry Clements**	**2,571**	**52.1**	**−8.3**
Labour	Alexander Carmichael	1,088	22.1	−17.5
Liberal Democrats	Charles Bradbury	946	19.2	+19.2
UKIP	William Attwood	327	6.6	+6.6
Majority		1,483	30.1	+9.3
Turnout		4,932	78.6	+10.4
Conservative **hold**		Swing	+4.6	

Tower (2 Seats)
Party	Candidate	Votes	%
**Labour**	**David Lockwood ***	**3,181**	**32.7**
**Conservative**	**Paul Hopfensperger**	**2,747**	**28.3**
Labour	Ray Nowak *	2,720	
Conservative	Robert Everitt	2,663	
Liberal Democrats	David Chappell	1,738	17.9
Liberal Democrats	Daniel Warren	1,266	
UKIP	Brian Lockwood	801	8.2
Independent	David Nettleton	799	8.2
UKIP	Ivan Cook	509	
Independent	Melinda Nettleton	498	
Green	Adam Stacey	455	4.7
Green	Samantha Hunt Stacey	432	
Majority		434	4.5
Turnout		17,809	68.6
Labour **win** (new seat)			
Conservative **win** (new seat)			

=== Waveney ===
District summary

Party	Seats	+/-	Votes	%	+/-
Labour	9	▼1	34,051	38.0	−10.2
Conservative	4	Steady	30,026	33.5	−4.1
Liberal Democrat	0	Steady	16,826	18.8	+4.6
Green	0	Steady	6,229	7.0	+7.0
Independent	0	Steady	2,488	2.8	+2.8

Division results

Beccles (2 Seats)
Party	Candidate	Votes	%
**Conservative**	**Mark Bee**	**3,104**	**39.0**
**Labour**	**John Taylor ***	**2,757**	**34.6**
Labour	Alan Thwaites *	2,714	
Conservative	Kenneth Sale	2,255	
Liberal Democrats	Frances Mitchell	1,280	16.1
Liberal Democrats	Philip Mitchell	1,139	
Green	Graham Elliot	822	10.3
Green	Liam Carroll	383	
Turnout		14,454	63.7
Conservative **win** (new seat)			
Labour **win** (new seat)			

Bungay
Party	Candidate	Votes	%	±%
**Conservative**	**Morris Rose ***	**2,061**	**41.5**	**−3.5**
Labour	Lynn Derges	1,361	27.4	−8.6
Liberal Democrats	Wendy Curry	1,052	21.2	+2.2
Green	Lorna Kerrison	488	9.8	+9.8
Majority		700	14.1	+5.2
Turnout		4,962	68.8	+3.9
Conservative **hold**		Swing	+2.6	

Gunton (2 Seats)
Party	Candidate	Votes	%	±%
**Labour**	**Keith Patience**	**3,574**	**41.9**	**+0.3**
**Labour**	**David Thomas ***	**2,256**		
Conservative	Nancy Cuss	2,256	26.4	−17.4
Conservative	David Provan	1,948		
Liberal Democrats	Patricia Anderson	1,500	17.6	+3.0
Liberal Democrats	Peter Guyton	1,372		
Independent	Dorothy Blenkinsopp	621	7.3	+7.3
Green	Lucille Mason	580	6.8	+6.8
Green	Maxine Narburgh	498		
Majority		1,318	15.4	+13.2
Turnout		8,531	51.8	−10.8
Labour **gain** from Conservative		Swing	+8.8	
Labour **win** (new seat)				

Halesworth
Party	Candidate	Votes	%	±%
**Conservative**	**Wendy Mawer**	**2,368**	**46.4**	**−8.4**
Labour	Alan Brown	1,402	27.5	−17.7
Liberal Democrats	Roberta Pumer	833	16.3	+16.3
Green	Jen Berry	500	9.8	+9.8
Majority		966	18.9	+9.3
Turnout		5,103	70.1	+5.3
Conservative **hold**		Swing	+4.7	

Kessingland and Southwold
Party	Candidate	Votes	%
**Conservative**	**John Goldsmith ***	**2,341**	**45.1**
Labour	Michael Pickles	1,566	30.1
Liberal Democrats	Christopher MacKinnon	972	18.7
Green	Will Windell	316	6.1
Majority		775	14.9
Turnout		5,195	69.8
Conservative **win** (new seat)			

Lowestoft South (2 Seats)
Party	Candidate	Votes	%
**Labour**	**Jane Hore ***	**3,550**	**43.0**
**Labour**	**Julian Swainson ***	**2,458**	
Conservative	Frank Mortimer	2,190	26.5
Liberal Democrats	Andrew Shepherd	2,055	24.9
Liberal Democrats	Gifford Baxter	1,995	
Conservative	Jamie Starling	1,845	
Green	Gary Hilton	465	5.6
Green	Christopher Goodings	431	
Majority		1,360	16.5
Turnout		8,260	51.6
Labour **win** (new seat)			
Labour **win** (new seat)			

Oulton (2 Seats)
Party	Candidate	Votes	%
**Labour**	**Allyson Barron**	**3,266**	**37.2**
**Labour**	**Malcolm Cherry ***	**3,217**	
Conservative	Mike Barnard	2,920	33.2
Conservative	John Burford	2,355	
Liberal Democrats	Leslie Batchelder	1,329	15.1
Liberal Democrats	Antony Tibbitt	1,188	
Independent	Peter Collecott	808	9.2
Independent	Jennifer Hinton	656	
Green	Kerry Taylor	465	5.3
Green	Stephen Sizer	413	
Independent	George Hawes	403	
Majority		346	3.9
Turnout		8,788	57.9
Labour **win** (new seat)			
Labour **win** (new seat)			

Pakefield (2 Seats)
Party	Candidate	Votes	%	±%
**Labour**	**Stephen Barrett**	**2,888**	**41.9**	**−3.0**
**Labour**	**Roger Bellham ***	**2,689**		
Conservative	Janice Corbett	2,322	33.7	+6.6
Conservative	Brian Keller	2,061		
Liberal Democrats	Brenna Batchelder	1,154	16.8	−11.2
Liberal Democrats	Sandra Tonge	958		
Green	Mike Milan	525	7.6	+7.6
Green	Philip Tregear	343		
Majority		566	8.2	−8.8
Turnout		6,889	58.3	−3.2
Labour **hold**		Swing	−4.8	
Labour **win** (new seat)				
