= 2026 Suffolk County Council election =

2026 English local government election

- 7 May 2026

All 70 seats to Suffolk County Council 36 seats needed for a majority
- Registered: 585,023
- Turnout: 44.2%
	First party	Second party	Third party
Leader	Christopher Hudson	Andrew Stringer	Matthew Hicks
Party	Reform	Green	Conservative
Last election	Did not stand	9 seats, 15.0%	55 seats, 47.6%
Seats before	6	9	44
Seats won	41	13	9
Seat change	▲35	▲4	▼35
Popular vote	88,427	62,761	58,443
Percentage	33.1%	23.5%	21.9%
Swing	N/A	▲8.4%	▼26.1%
	Fourth party	Fifth party	Sixth party
Leader	Sandy Martin (retiring)	Penny Otton
Party	Labour	Liberal Democrats	Independent
Last election	5 seats, 21.3%	4 seats, 9.9%	1 seat, 4.5%
Seats before	5	5	4
Seats won	3	2	2
Seat change	▼2	▼3	▼2
Popular vote	27,778	23,906	5,483
Percentage	10.4%	9.0%	2.1%
Swing	▼11.1%	▼0.9%	▼2.4%
- Winner of each electoral division at the 2026 Suffolk County Council election.
Leader before election
Matthew Hicks
Conservative
Leader after election
Michael Hadwen
Reform

The 2026 Suffolk County Council election was a local government election for Suffolk County Council in England, United Kingdom. It took place on 7 May 2026 as part of the 2026 local elections.

Prior to the election, the council was under Conservative majority control. The election saw Reform UK win a majority of the seats. After the election, Reform chose Michael Hadwen to be its new group leader, and he was formally appointed as the new leader of the council at the subsequent annual council meeting on 21 May 2026.

== Overview ==
The 2026 election for new councillors for Suffolk County Council took place on 7 May 2026 as part of the 2026 local elections in the United Kingdom.

This election followed a review by Local Government Boundary Commission for England which reduced the number of councillors from 75 to 70. All 70 councillors are elected from 69 electoral divisions, which return either one or two county councillors each, by first-past-the-post voting.

Beccles and Kessingland is the only two-member ward, with all other wards being one-member. Voters who live in the two-member division are entitled to cast a maximum of two votes, while those living in the divisions only electing one councillor are only entitled to cast one vote.

The election was postponed from 2025 due to the 2024–present structural changes to local government in England.

The government announced plans to further delay the election to 2027, following support from the Conservative administration, but reversed the decision following a legal challenge by Reform UK.

== Previous composition ==
=== 2021 election ===
Party	Seats
Conservative	55
Green	9
Labour	5
Liberal Democrats	4
Independent	1
West Suffolk Independents	1
Total	75

=== Composition of council seats before election ===
Party	Seats
Conservative	50
Green	9
Labour	6
Liberal Democrats	5
Independent	2
West Suffolk Independents	1
Reform	1
Vacant	1
Total	75

=== Changes between elections ===
In between the 2021 election and the 2026 election, the following council seats changed hands:

Division	Date	Previous party	New party	Cause	Resulting council composition						
Division	Date	Previous party	New party	Cause	Con	Grn	Lab	LD	Ind	WSI	Ref
2021 Suffolk County Council election					55	9	5	4	1	1	0
Felixstowe Coastal	4 May 2023	Conservative	Liberal Democrats	Sitting councillor died. Liberal Democrats won by-election.	54	9	5	5	1	1	0
Whitehouse & Whitton	6 February 2024	Conservative	Independent	Councillor quit party to sit as an independent member.	53	9	5	5	2	1	0
Pakefield	4 July 2024	Conservative	Labour	Won by-election.	52	9	6	5	2	1	0
Belstead Brook	6 September 2024	Conservative	Reform	Councillor defected to Reform UK.	51	9	6	5	2	1	1
Eastgate & Moreton Hall	21 April 2025	Conservative	Independent	Councillor quit party to sit as an independent member.	51	9	6	5	2	1	1
Whitehouse & Whitton	21 April 2025	Independent	Conservative	Councillor rejoined party.	51	9	6	5	2	1	1
Tower	3 July 2025	Conservative	Reform	Won by-election.	50	9	6	5	2	1	2
Tower	18 September 2025	Conservative	Independent	Councillor quit party to sit as an independent member.	48	9	6	5	3	1	3
Sudbury East and Waldingfield	18 September 2025	Conservative	Reform	Councillor defected.	48	9	6	5	3	1	3
Whitehouse & Whitton	30 September 2025	Conservative	Independent	Councillor quit party to sit as an independent member.	47	9	6	5	4	1	3
Haverhill Cangle	7 October 2025	Conservative	Reform	Councillor defected.	46	9	6	5	4	1	4
Pakefield	23 October 2025	Conservative	Reform	Councillor died.	45	9	6	5	4	1	5
Martlesham	14 January 2026	Conservative	Reform	Councillor defected.	44	9	6	5	4	1	6

== Summary ==
=== Election result ===
2026 Suffolk County Council election
Party	Candidates	Seats	Gains	Losses	Net gain/loss	Seats %	Votes %	Votes	+/−
Reform	70	41	N/A	N/A	▲35	58.6	33.1	88,427	N/A
Green	69	13	N/A	N/A	▲4	18.6	23.5	62,761	+8.4
Conservative	69	9	N/A	N/A	▼35	12.9	21.9	58,443	–26.1
Labour	70	3	N/A	N/A	▼2	4.3	10.4	27,778	–11.1
Liberal Democrats	63	2	N/A	N/A	▼3	2.9	9.0	23,906	–0.9
Independent	10	2	N/A	N/A	▼2	2.9	2.1	5,483	–2.4
Monster Raving Loony	1	0	N/A	N/A	Steady	0.0	<0.1	25	N/A
Communist	1	0	N/A	N/A	Steady	0.0	<0.1	17	–0.1

== Division results by local authority ==
=== Babergh ===
Incumbents

Ward	Incumbent councillor	Party	Re-standing
Belstead Brook	Christopher Hudson (Note: Originally elected as a Conservative, but later defected to Reform.)	Reform	Yes
Cosford	Robert Lindsay	Green	Yes
Great Cornard	Peter Beer	Conservative	No
Hadleigh	Mick Fraser	Conservative	No
Melford	Richard Kemp	Independent	No
Peninsula	Simon Harley	Green	No
Samford	Georgia Hall	Conservative	No
Stour Valley	James Finch	Conservative	No
Sudbury	Jessie Carter	Green	No
Sudbury East & Waldingfield	Philip Faircloth-Mutton	Reform	Yes

Authority summary

Babergh district summary
Party	Seats	+/-	Votes	%	+/-
Reform	4	▲2	12,146	33.8	N/A
Green	3	Steady	9,212	25.6	+2.1
Conservative	1	▼3	7,377	20.5	-19.9
Independent	1	Steady	1,439	4.0	-12.5
Liberal Democrats	0	Steady	3,854	10.7	+2.0
Labour	0	Steady	1,925	5.4	-5.5
Total	9	▼1	34,583	46.4	+7.7
Registered electors			74,573	–	+4.0

Division results

Brook
Party	Candidate	Votes	%	±%
Reform	Christopher Hudson*	1,342	38.7	N/A
Conservative	Debbie Richards	658	19.0	−31.8
Green	Leigh Jamieson	653	18.8	N/A
Liberal Democrats	Helen-Victoria Davies	629	18.1	−15.6
Labour	Graham Manuel	183	5.3	−10.3
Majority		684	19.7	N/A
Turnout		3,477	44.9	−12.2
Registered electors		7,738		
Reform hold				

Constable
Party	Candidate	Votes	%
Conservative	Darius Laws	1,459	30.1
Reform	Marc Rowland	1,346	27.7
Liberal Democrats	John Whyman	1,059	21.8
Green	Zunaid Saiyed	743	15.3
Labour	Lindsay Francis	235	4.8
Majority		113	2.3
Turnout		4,841	53.6
Registered electors		9,007	
Conservative win (new seat)			

Cornard & Sudbury East
Party	Candidate	Votes	%
Reform	Kerrie Turner	1,316	41.2
Green	Sara Merritt	861	26.9
Conservative	Harry Cansdale	461	14.4
Labour	Alison Owen	323	10.1
Liberal Democrats	Marjorie Bark	228	7.1
Majority		455	14.2
Turnout		3,202	40.9
Registered electors		7,824	
Reform win (new seat)			

Cosford
Party	Candidate	Votes	%	±%
Green	Robert Lindsay*	1,658	35.7	−26.4
Reform	Patrick Wegener	1,488	32.0	N/A
Conservative	Ellena Cook	1,143	24.6	−9.9
Liberal Democrats	David Butcher	228	4.9	N/A
Labour	Rupert Perry	123	2.6	−0.8
Majority		170	3.7	–23.9
Turnout		3,202	40.9	−7.6
Registered electors		7,824		
Green hold				

Hadleigh
Party	Candidate	Votes	%	±%
Green	Simon Dowling	1,325	35.0	+17.5
Reform	Matthew Prescott Frost	1,287	34.0	N/A
Conservative	Ian McIntyre	770	20.3	−15.6
Liberal Democrats	Rain Welham-Cobb	220	5.8	−2.3
Labour	Jane Wakeman	178	4.7	−3.4
Majority		38	1.0	N/A
Turnout		3,787	45.3	+12.3
Registered electors		8,360		
Green gain from Conservative				

Melford
Party	Candidate	Votes	%	±%
Independent	John Nunn	1,321	31.8	−23.0
Reform	Michael Holt	1,305	31.4	N/A
Green	Robert Parkes	753	18.1	+8.3
Conservative	Bill Davies	491	11.8	−16.1
Labour	Matthew Marshall	154	3.7	−3.8
Liberal Democrats	Alan Scott	130	3.1	N/A
Majority		16	0.4	–26.5
Turnout		4,159	50.4	+12.1
Registered electors		8,247		
Independent hold				

Peninsula
Party	Candidate	Votes	%	±%
Reform	Vicky Armstrong	1,389	31.7	N/A
Green	Joshua Overton	1,239	28.3	−14.1
Conservative	Josie Ruffles	997	22.8	−7.4
Labour	Emma Bishton	327	7.5	+0.5
Liberal Democrats	Paul Woodcraft	305	7.0	N/A
Independent	Tim Amass	118	2.7	N/A
Majority		150	3.4	N/A
Turnout		4,388	49.6	+6.8
Registered electors		8,851		
Reform gain from Green				

Stour Valley
Party	Candidate	Votes	%	±%
Reform	Philip Faircloth-Mutton*	1,646	41.0	N/A
Conservative	Isabelle Reece	957	23.8	−26.8
Green	Siobhan Harris	606	15.1	+8.7
Liberal Democrats	Bryn Hurren	575	14.3	−21.9
Labour	Chris Mills	229	5.7	−1.1
Majority		689	17.2	N/A
Turnout		4,023	45.5	–1.8
Registered electors		8,848		
Reform hold				

Sudbury West
Party	Candidate	Votes	%
Green	Laura Smith	1,374	39.3
Reform	Robert Wade	1,027	29.4
Liberal Democrats	Nigel Bennett	480	13.7
Conservative	Michael Heyland	441	12.6
Labour	Adrian Stohr	173	4.9
Majority		347	9.9
Turnout		3,504	44.5
Registered electors		7,874	
Green win (new seat)			

=== East Suffolk ===
Authority summary

East Suffolk district summary
Party	Seats	+/-	Votes		+/-
Reform	16	▲14	32,308	34.5	N/A
Green	4	▲1	23,117	24.7	+10.7
Conservative	2	▼16	19,677	21.0	–32.5
Liberal Democrats	1	▼1	9,083	9.7	–0.4
Independent	1	▲1	1,108	1.2	±0.0
Labour	0	▼1	8,440	9.0	–12.1
Monster Raving Loony	0	Steady	25	<0.1	N/A
Total	24	▼2	87,146	44.5	+8.1
Registered electors			195,727	–	+1.0

Incumbents

Division	Incumbent councillor	Party	Re-standing
Aldeburgh & Leiston	TJ Haworth-Cuff	Conservative	
Beccles	Caroline Topping	Green	
Beccles	Ash Lever (Note: Elected at the 2022 Beccles by-election.)	Green	
Blything	Richard Smith	Conservative	No
Bungay	Judy Cloke	Conservative	
Carlford	Elaine Bryce	Conservative	
Felixstowe Coastal	Seamus Bennett (Note: Elected at the 2023 Felixstowe Coastal by-election.)	Liberal Democrats	
Felixstowe Coastal	Steve Wiles	Conservative	
Felixstowe North & Trimley	Stuart Bird	Conservative	
Framlingham	Stephen Burroughes	Conservative	
Gunton	Ryan Harvey	Conservative	
Gunton	James Reader	Conservative	
Halesworth	Annette Dunning	Green	
Kesgrave & Rushmere St Andrew	Stuart Lawson	Conservative	
Kesgrave & Rushmere St Andrew	Debbie McCallum	Conservative	
Kessingland & Southwold	Michael Ladd	Conservative	
Lowestoft South	Jenny Ceresa	Conservative	
Lowestoft South	Jamie Starling	Conservative	
Martlesham	Patti Mulcahy	Reform	
Oulton	Keith Robinson	Conservative	
Oulton	Edward Back	Conservative	
Pakefield	Peter Byatt (Note: Elected at the 2024 Pakefield by-election.)	Labour	
Pakefield	June Mummery (Note: Elected at the 2025 Pakefield by-election.)	Reform	
Wickham	Alexander Nicoll	Conservative	
Wilford	Andrew Reid	Conservative	
Woodbridge	Ruth Leach (Note: Elected at the 2023 Woodbridge by-election.)	Liberal Democrats	

Division results

Aldeburgh & Leiston
Party	Candidate	Votes	%	±%
Reform	Rachael Tecklenberg	1,156	32.5	N/A
Conservative	Tom Faulkner	943	26.5	−40.1
Green	Sarah Whitelock	931	26.2	N/A
Labour	Eva Turner	322	9.1	−24.3
Liberal Democrats	Bradley Clements	203	5.7	N/A
Majority		213	6.0	N/A
Turnout		3,567	43.0	+6.8
Registered electors		8,216		
Reform gain from Conservative				

Beccles & Kessingland (2 seats)
Party	Candidate	Votes	%
Green	Ash Lever*	2,686	38.0
Reform	Chris Cox	2,676	37.9
Green	Christine Wheeler	2,665	37.7
Reform	Mel Calaby	2,474	35.0
Conservative	Mark Bee	1,248	17.7
Conservative	Ryan Harvey	968	13.7
Labour	Alan Green	525	7.4
Labour	Sam Hunt	427	6.0
Liberal Democrats	Susan Groome	256	3.6
Liberal Democrats	Tom Jordan	202	2.9
Turnout		7,226	43.7
Registered electors		16,517	
Green win (new seat)			
Reform win (new seat)			

Blyth Estuary
Party	Candidate	Votes	%
Reform	John Matthews	1,108	26.9
Conservative	John Cooper	877	21.3
Liberal Democrats	Andrew Turner	866	21.1
Green	Rachel Kellett	778	18.9
Labour	Michael Rowan-Robinson	484	11.8
Majority		231	5.6
Turnout		4,126	50.9
Registered electors		8,104	
Reform win (new seat)			

Bungay
Party	Candidate	Votes	%	±%
Green	Peter Aiano	1,681	43.5	+1.6
Reform	Herbie Crossman	1,180	30.6	N/A
Conservative	Victoria Drew-Batty	629	16.3	−27.6
Liberal Democrats	John Awty	207	5.4	+0.6
Labour	Tim Mobbs	140	3.6	−5.4
Monster Raving Loony	Eddie Henderson	25	0.6	N/A
Majority		501	13.0	N/A
Turnout		3,869	50.9	+9.5
Registered electors		7,608		
Green gain from Conservative				

Carlford
Party	Candidate	Votes	%	±%
Conservative	Elaine Bryce*	1,909	40.1	−23.1
Reform	Georgia Howell	1.196	25.1	N/A
Green	Stephen Munson	1,143	24.0	+2.6
Liberal Democrats	Hugo Mason	257	5.4	N/A
Labour	Belinda Randall	253	5.3	−10.1
Majority		713	15.0	–26.8
Turnout		4,774	56.1	+10.8
Registered electors		8,516		
Conservative hold				

Carlton & Whitton
Party	Candidate	Votes	%
Reform	Richard Read	1,384	46.8
Conservative	Jenny Ceresa*	677	22.9
Green	Rosemary Brambley	373	12.6
Labour	Lewis Weller	341	11.5
Liberal Democrats	Dave O'Neill	171	5.8
Majority		707	23.9
Turnout		2,955	37.0
Registered electors		7,994	
Reform win (new seat)			

Carlton Colville
Party	Candidate	Votes	%
Reform	June Mummery*	1,346	51.1
Conservative	Letitia Smith	447	17.0
Green	Alan Barnes	411	15.6
Liberal Democrats	Chris Thomas	220	8.3
Labour	Marilyn Sayer	211	8.0
Majority		899	34.1
Turnout		2,643	34.5
Registered electors		7,654	
Reform win (new seat)			

Felixstowe Clifflands
Party	Candidate	Votes	%
Reform	Michael Hadwen	1,508	32.9
Liberal Democrats	Seamus Bennett*	1,349	29.4
Conservative	Kevin Sullivan	788	17.2
Green	Angus Thody	579	12.6
Labour	Skye Vincent	366	8.0
Majority		159	3.5
Turnout		4,595	57.4
Registered electors		8,005	
Reform win (new seat)			

Felixstowe Maritime
Party	Candidate	Votes	%
Reform	Tony Love	1,418	43.4
Green	Stephen Wyatt	696	21.3
Conservative	Georgina Allan	456	14.0
Labour	Rosie Smithson	393	12.0
Liberal Democrats	Jan Candy	301	9.2
Majority		722	22.1
Turnout		3,271	38.6
Registered electors		8,475	
Reform win (new seat)			

Framlingham & Wickham Market
Party	Candidate	Votes	%
Green	Stephen Molyneux	1,491	34.4
Reform	David Bowen	1,239	28.6
Conservative	Stephen Burroughes*	1,076	24.8
Liberal Democrats	Edward Robinson	309	7.1
Labour	Luke Halpin	219	5.1
Majority		252	5.8
Turnout		4,351	48.7
Registered electors		8,934	
Green win (new seat)			

Gunton
Party	Candidate	Votes	%	±%
Reform	Chris Smith	1,287	45.3	N/A
Conservative	James Reader*	587	20.6	−23.5
Labour	Graham Parker	561	19.7	−15.4
Green	Joe Hynes	298	10.5	−0.3
Liberal Democrats	Michelle Lavill	110	3.9	N/A
Majority		700	24.6	N/A
Turnout		2,856	37.8	+12.2
Registered electors		7,550		
Reform gain from Conservative				

Halesworth
Party	Candidate	Votes	%	±%
Green	Annette Dunning*	1,761	45.7	−3.1
Reform	Garry Debenham	1,064	27.6	N/A
Conservative	Lawrence Champion	650	16.9	−23.7
Liberal Democrats	Sally East	224	5.8	+3.2
Labour	Ian Luff	158	4.1	−3.9
Majority		697	18.1	+9.9
Turnout		3,873	49.8	+7.2
Registered electors		7,770		
Green hold				

Harbour
Party	Candidate	Votes	%
Reform	Rob Ayling	904	43.2
Green	James Marjoram	471	22.5
Labour	Tess Gandy	431	20.6
Conservative	May Reader	180	8.6
Liberal Democrats	John Shreeve	109	5.2
Majority		433	20.7
Turnout		2,113	24.8
Registered electors		8,504	
Reform win (new seat)			

Kesgrave
Party	Candidate	Votes	%
Conservative	Debbie McCallum*	1,308	33.6
Green	Vicky Harper	1,120	28.8
Reform	Simon Bevan	1,072	27.5
Labour Co-op	Branden Moore	215	5.5
Liberal Democrats	Sally Neal	178	4.6
Majority		188	4.8
Turnout		3,902	44.0
Registered electors		8,859	
Conservative win (new seat)			

Kirkley & Pakefield
Party	Candidate	Votes	%
Reform	Paul Reeder	1,322	40.7
Green	Dom Taylor	1,005	31.0
Labour	Peter Byatt*	544	16.8
Conservative	Linda Bee	273	8.4
Liberal Democrats	Catharine Earl	103	3.2
Majority		317	9.8
Turnout		3,257	36.8
Registered electors		8,845	
Reform win (new seat)			

Martlesham
Party	Candidate	Votes	%	±%
Reform	Patti Mulcahy*	1,286	32.9	N/A
Conservative	James Harding	1,019	26.0	−36.3
Liberal Democrats	Mark Packard	675	17.2	−2.3
Green	Eamonn O'Nolon	612	15.6	N/A
Labour	Simon Whitney	322	8.2	−10.0
Majority		267	6.8	N/A
Turnout		3,921	51.9	+11.1
Registered electors		7,561		
Reform gain from Conservative				

Oulton Broad & Normanston
Party	Candidate	Votes	%
Reform	Trevor Lailey	1,424	44.8
Conservative	Edward Back*	771	24.3
Green	Moira Dealey	441	13.9
Labour	Christian Newsome	378	11.9
Liberal Democrats	Richard Fowler	163	5.1
Majority		653	20.6
Turnout		3,188	38.6
Registered electors		8,252	
Reform win (new seat)			

Oulton
Party	Candidate	Votes	%	±%
Reform	Paul Sutton	1,565	47.4	N/A
Conservative	Keith Robinson*	721	21.8	−32.2
Green	Patricia Teixeira	513	15.5	+6.9
Labour	Graham Macintosh	343	10.4	−17.0
Liberal Democrats	Fiona Shreeve	163	4.9	+2.1
Majority		844	25.5	N/A
Turnout		3,315	39.5	+9.0
Registered electors		8,402		
Reform gain from Conservative				

Rushmere St Andrew
Party	Candidate	Votes	%
Reform	Alistair Jeffreys	1,400	37.0
Conservative	Robert Cawley	1,091	28.8
Green	Julian Cusack	533	14.1
Labour Co-op	Paul Richards	436	11.5
Liberal Democrats	Ed Thompson	328	8.7
Majority		309	8.2
Turnout		3,798	48.4
Registered electors		7,851	
Reform win (new seat)			

Saxmundham & District
Party	Candidate	Votes	%
Independent	Julia Ewart	1,108	28.6
Reform	Alex Savva	906	23.4
Green	Marianne Fellowes	903	23.3
Conservative	Dominic Keen	588	15.2
Labour	Philip O'Hear	230	5.9
Liberal Democrats	James Sandbach	139	3.6
Majority		202	5.1
Turnout		3,937	50.9
Registered electors		7,729	
Independent win (new seat)			

Walton & Trimleys
Party	Candidate	Votes	%
Reform	Tristan Gale	1,305	38.9
Conservative	Stuart Bird*	625	18.7
Labour	David Rowe	543	16.2
Green	Jessica Bream	521	15.5
Liberal Democrats	Lee Reeves	357	10.7
Majority		680	20.3
Turnout		3,358	40.8
Registered electors		8,234	
Reform win (new seat)			

Wilford
Party	Candidate	Votes	%
Reform	Jonathan Ramsay	1,273	31.8
Conservative	James Mallinder	1,150	28.8
Green	Tom Daly	1,046	26.2
Liberal Democrats	Linda Packard	267	6.7
Labour Co-op	Des Waters	262	6.6
Majority		123	3.1
Turnout		4,011	49.8
Registered electors		8,052	
Reform win (new seat)			

Woodbridge
Party	Candidate	Votes	%	±%
Liberal Democrats	Ruth Leach*	1,926	45.5	−18.0
Reform	John Grumbridge	815	19.3	N/A
Conservative	Geoff Holdcroft	696	16.4	−20.1
Green	Andrew Eastaugh	459	10.8	N/A
Labour	Jonathan Mason-Gordon	336	7.9	N/A
Majority		957	21.2	–5.8
Turnout		4,240	52.5	+5.6
Registered electors		8,075		
Liberal Democrats hold				

=== Ipswich ===
Authority summary

Ipswich district summary
Party	Seats	+/-	Votes	%	+/-
Reform	8	▲8	12,939	31.3	N/A
Labour	3	▼2	10,358	25.2	-11.9
Liberal Democrats	1	Steady	4,032	9.8	-1.5
Green	0	Steady	7,667	18.7	+9.3
Conservative	0	▼6	5,950	14.5	-27.4
Independent	0	▼1	N/A (Note: Did not stand candidates.)	N/A	N/A
Total	12	▼1	41,052	41.3	+3.7
Registered electors			99,481	–	–0.3

Incumbents

Ward	Incumbent councillor	Party	Re-standing
Bixley	Paul West	Conservative	Yes
Bridge	Rob Bridgeman	Labour	No
Chantry	Nadia Cenci	Conservative	Yes
Chantry	Nathan Wilson	Conservative	No
Gainsborough	Liz Harsant	Conservative	Yes
Priory Heath	Lucy Smith (Note: Elected at the 2023 Priory Heath by-election.)	Labour	No
Rushmere	Sandy Martin	Labour Co-op	No
St Helen's	Elizabeth Farrow	Labour	No
St John's	Adele Cook (Note: Elected at the 2025 St John's by-election.)	Labour Co-op	Yes
St Margaret's & Westgate	Inga Lockington	Liberal Democrats	Yes
St Margaret's & Westgate	Debbie Richards	Conservative	No
Whitehouse & Whitton	Sam Murray (Note: Originally elected as a Conservative, but left the party to sit as an independent.)	Independent	No
Whitehouse & Whitton	David Goldsmith	Conservative	No

Division results

Belstead Hills
Party	Candidate	Votes	%
Reform	Morgan Brobyn	1,309	40.2
Conservative	Nadia Cenci*	809	24.8
Labour	Viorica-Mihaela Berculean	615	18.9
Green	David Revett	359	11.0
Liberal Democrats	Robin Whitmore	168	5.2
Majority		500	15.3
Turnout		3,274	40.3
Registered electors		8,131	
Reform win (new seat)			

Bixley
Party	Candidate	Votes	%	±%
Reform	David Hill	1,283	30.8	N/A
Conservative	Paul West*	1,027	24.7	−36.9
Labour	Laurence Bradley	911	21.9	−1.9
Green	Stephanie Cullen	694	16.7	+7.6
Liberal Democrats	Lisa Weichert	249	6.0	+0.5
Majority		256	6.1	N/A
Turnout		4,173	49.2	+2.1
Registered electors		8,490		
Reform hold				

Bridge
Party	Candidate	Votes	%	±%
Reform	Rupert Tonkin-Galvin	898	30.2	N/A
Labour	Sachin Karale	887	29.9	−13.4
Green	Jamie Allenden	625	21.0	+9.5
Conservative	Sian Gubb	380	12.8	−26.9
Liberal Democrats	Henry Williams	181	6.1	+0.6
Majority		11	0.4	N/A
Turnout		2,973	35.3	+4.6
Registered electors		8,416		
Reform gain from Labour				

Gainsborough
Party	Candidate	Votes	%	±%
Reform	Ryan Procter	1,043	33.6	N/A
Labour Co-op	Kelvin Cracknell	744	24.0	−12.8
Conservative	Liz Harsant*	725	23.3	−29.6
Green	Juliet Garside	480	15.5	+13.3
Liberal Democrats	Trevor Powell	114	3.7	−4.3
Majority		299	9.6	N/A
Turnout		3,133	39.3	–0.3
Registered electors		7,971		
Reform gain from Conservative		Swing		

Gipping
Party	Candidate	Votes	%
Reform	Stuart Allen	1,104	37.2
Labour	David Ellesmere	850	28.7
Green	Dalian Haynes	494	16.7
Conservative	Bbosa Kiyingi	346	11.7
Liberal Democrats	Daniel Davey	172	5.8
Majority		254	8.6
Turnout		2,982	35.0
Registered electors		8,533	
Reform win (new seat)			

Priory Heath
Party	Candidate	Votes	%	±%
Reform	Tim Buttle	1,140	35.4	N/A
Labour	Jaya Georgey	912	28.3	−17.4
Green	Paul Daley	568	17.6	+8.6
Conservative	Albert Demaj	412	12.8	−27.7
Liberal Democrats	Nigel Fox	188	5.8	+0.9
Majority		228	7.1	N/A
Turnout		3,233	38.6	+4.6
Registered electors		8,382		
Reform gain from Labour				

Rushmere
Party	Candidate	Votes	%	±%
Labour	Martin Cook	1,311	32.8	−10.4
Reform	Vicky Hill	1,023	25.6	N/A
Green	Susan Hagley	762	19.1	+11.7
Conservative	Chijioke Philip	592	14.8	−27.2
Liberal Democrats	Lucy Drake	308	7.7	+0.4
Majority		288	7.2	N/A
Turnout		4,008	48.9	+5.5
Registered electors		8,203		
Labour hold				

St Clements
Party	Candidate	Votes	%
Labour Co-op	Adele Cook*	1,223	32.7
Green	David Plowman	1,115	29.8
Reform	Jeffrey Ciobanu	884	23.6
Conservative	Angelina Klein	322	8.6
Liberal Democrats	Timothy Lockington	199	5.3
Majority		108	2.9
Turnout		3,753	44.0
Registered electors		8,529	
Labour Co-op win (new seat)			

St Margaret's
Party	Candidate	Votes	%
Liberal Democrats	Inga Lockington*	1,660	38.3
Reform	Graham Knight	795	18.3
Green	Kirsty Wilmot	706	16.3
Labour	Adam Rae	622	14.3
Conservative	Laura Allenby	555	12.8
Majority		865	19.9
Turnout		4,354	50.8
Registered electors		8,569	
Liberal Democrats win (new seat)			

Westbourne
Party	Candidate	Votes	%
Reform	David Hurlbut	1,183	39.9
Green	Alison Seddon	716	24.2
Labour Co-op	Elizabeth Hughes	586	19.8
Conservative	Steven Wells	320	10.8
Liberal Democrats	Martin Pakes	158	5.3
Majority		467	15.8
Turnout		2,980	37.2
Registered electors		8,002	
Reform win (new seat)			

Westgate
Party	Candidate	Votes	%
Labour	Colin Kreidewolf	939	29.2
Reform	Joshua Owens	803	24.9
Green	Jennifer McCarthy	718	22.3
Conservative	Stephen Ion	462	14.4
Liberal Democrats	Martin Hore	297	9.2
Majority		136	4.2
Turnout		3,246	38.9
Registered electors		8,338	
Labour win (new seat)			

Whitton
Party	Candidate	Votes	%
Reform	Colin Gould	1,374	47.4
Labour Co-op	Stephen Connelly	758	26.1
Green	Groovy Scott	430	14.8
Liberal Democrats	Nick Jacob	338	11.7
Majority		616	21.2
Turnout		2,943	37.2
Registered electors		7,917	
Reform win (new seat)			

=== Mid Suffolk ===
Authority summary

Mid Suffolk district summary
Party	Seats	+/-	Votes		+/-
Green	5	▲2	14,116	33.2	+12.6
Reform	4	▲4	13,583	32.0	N/A
Conservative	1	▼4	9,540	22.5	–22.4
Liberal Democrats	0	▼2	3,368	7.9	–9.1
Labour	0	Steady	1,839	4.3	–7.5
Total	10	Steady	41,690	47.7	+11.0
Registered electors			87,483	–	+8.1

Incumbents

Ward	Incumbent councillor	Party	Re-standing
Bosmere	Kay Oakes	Conservative	
Gipping Valley	Chris Chambers	Conservative	
Hartismere	Jessica Fleming	Conservative	
Hoxne & Eye	Henry Lloyd	Conservative	
Stowmarket North & Stowupland	Keith Welham	Green	
Stowmarket South	Keith Scarff	Liberal Democrats	
Thedwastre North	Andy Mellan	Green	
Thedwastre South	Penny Otton	Liberal Democrats	
Thredling	Matthew Hicks	Conservative	
Upper Gipping	Andrew Stringer	Green	

Division results

Bosmere
Party	Candidate	Votes	%	±%
Reform	Gary Keogh	1,241	33.5	N/A
Green	Adria Pittock	1,090	29.4	N/A
Conservative	Kay Oakes*	720	19.4	−30.0
Liberal Democrats	Attila Borzak	485	13.1	−24.6
Labour	Tina Cooke	174	4.7	−8.2
Majority		151	4.1	N/A
Turnout		3,721	44.6	+10.1
Registered electors		8,334		
Reform gain from Conservative				

Gipping Valley
Party	Candidate	Votes	%	±%
Reform	Asa Downing	1,308	35.9	N/A
Conservative	Chris Chambers*	1,063	29.2	−25.1
Green	Chris Goodchild	742	20.4	N/A
Liberal Democrats	Mark Pearson	351	9.6	−20.0
Labour	Hazel Stonya	178	4.9	−11.2
Majority		245	6.7	N/A
Turnout		3,649	42.6	+7.9
Registered electors		8,560		
Reform gain from Conservative				

Hartismere
Party	Candidate	Votes	%	±%
Reform	Paul Bains	1,674	35.2	N/A
Green	Rowland Warboys	1,619	34.1	+14.5
Conservative	Colin Noble	1,091	23.0	−34.5
Liberal Democrats	Hettie Glenton	215	4.5	−2.3
Labour	Paul Theaker	153	3.2	−12.9
Majority		55	1.2	N/A
Turnout		4,762	53.4	+12.4
Registered electors		8,911		
Reform gain from Conservative				

Hoxne & Eye
Party	Candidate	Votes	%	±%
Green	Sally Mittuch	1,526	34.4	N/A
Reform	Holly Drafahl	1,366	30.8	N/A
Conservative	Henry Lloyd*	1,185	26.7	−18.3
Liberal Democrats	Timothy Glenton	243	5.5	−13.6
Labour	Stephen Nixon	120	2.7	−8.4
Majority		160	3.6	N/A
Turnout		4,457	52.5	+9.6
Registered electors		8,492		
Green gain from Conservative				

Stowmarket East
Party	Candidate	Votes	%
Reform	Mark Barber	1,255	37.8
Liberal Democrats	Keith Scarff*	1,163	35.0
Conservative	Steve Runciman	534	16.1
Labour	Peter Armitage	368	11.1
Majority		92	2.8
Turnout		3,346	39.8
Registered electors		8,411	
Reform win (new seat)			

Stowmarket West
Party	Candidate	Votes	%
Green	Keith Welham*	1,456	44.1
Reform	Shaun Payne	1,148	34.8
Conservative	Paul Ekpenyong	518	15.7
Labour	Michael Smith	179	5.4
Majority		308	9.3
Turnout		3,314	40.8
Registered electors		8,128	
Green win (new seat)			

Thedwastre North
Party	Candidate	Votes	%	±%
Green	James Patchett	1,476	35.7	−4.9
Reform	David Wren	1,238	29.9	N/A
Conservative	Jane Storey	1,061	25.6	−8.4
Liberal Democrats	Steve Card	199	4.8	N/A
Labour	Calum Edwards	166	4.0	−1.5
Majority		238	5.7	–1.1
Turnout		4,154	46.4	+3.7
Registered electors		8,950		
Green hold				

Thedwastre South
Party	Candidate	Votes	%	±%
Green	Matt Bentley	1,518	31.1	N/A
Reform	David Flowerday	1,491	30.6	N/A
Conservative	James Spencer	959	19.7	−22.6
Liberal Democrats	Nicky Willshere	712	14.6	−31.4
Labour	Alan Conochie	195	4.0	−7.7
Majority		27	0.6	N/A
Turnout		4,881	49.6	+6.2
Registered electors		9,834		
Green gain from Liberal Democrats				

Thredling
Party	Candidate	Votes	%	±%
Conservative	Matthew Hicks*	1,715	36.6	−26.6
Green	Teresa Davis	1,468	31.3	+13.0
Reform	Chris Parrett	1,329	28.3	N/A
Labour	Martin Ince	179	3.8	−8.9
Majority		247	5.3	–39.7
Turnout		4,705	56.2	+13.6
Registered electors		8,366		
Conservative hold		Swing	▼19.8	

Upper Gipping
Party	Candidate	Votes	%	±%
Green	Andrew Stringer*	3,212	57.5	−5.8
Reform	Charles Tilbury	1,553	27.8	N/A
Conservative	Nicholas Gowrley	694	12.4	−17.8
Labour	Ann Cooke	127	2.3	−4.2
Majority		1,659	29.7	−3.3
Turnout		4,703	49.5	+3.9
Registered electors		9,497		
Green hold				

=== West Suffolk ===
Authority summary

West Suffolk district summary
Party	Seats	+/-	Votes		+/-
Reform	9	▲7	17,451	32.5	N/A
Conservative	5	▼6	15,899	29.6	-22.9
Green	1	▲1	8,649	16.1	+2.1
Labour	0	Steady	5,216	9.7	-8.1
Liberal Democrats	0	Steady	3,569	6.6	+3.3
Independent	0	▼3	2,936	5.5	-2.4
Communist	0	Steady	17	<0.1	N/A
Total	15	Steady	53,868	42.2	+7.7
Registered electors			127,759	–	+1.0

Incumbents

Ward	Incumbent councillor	Party	Re-standing
Blackbourn	Joanna Spicer	Conservative	No
Brandon	Victor Lukaniuk	WSI	
Clare	Bobby Bennett	Conservative	
Eastgate & Moreton Hall	Peter Thompson	Independent	
Exning & Newmarket	Rachel Hood	Conservative	
Hardwick	Richard Rout	Conservative	
Haverhill Cangle	Joe Mason	Conservative	
Haverhill Cangle	Heike Sowa	Reform	
Haverhill East & Kedlington	David Roach	Conservative	
Mildenhall	Lance Stanbury	Conservative	
Newmarket & Red Lodge	Andy Drummond	Conservative	
Row Heath	Colin Noble	Conservative	
Thingoe North	Beccy Hopfensperger	Conservative	
Thingoe South	Karen Soons	Conservative	
Tower	David Nettleton	Independent	
Tower	Martin Robinson (Note: Elected at the 2025 Tower by-election.)	Reform	

Division results

Abbeygate & Minden
Party	Candidate	Votes	%
Green	Dylan Roques	1,249	31.8
Reform	Catherine Mustoe	903	23.0
Conservative	Mark Winter	607	15.4
Labour	Donna Higgins	580	14.8
Independent	Paul Hopfensperger	442	11.2
Liberal Democrats	Aiden Roe	132	3.4
Communist	Darren Turner	17	0.4
Majority		346	8.8
Turnout		3,944	49.6
Registered electors		7,947	
Green win (new seat)			

Barrow & Thingoe
Party	Candidate	Votes	%
Conservative	Beccy Hopfensperger*	1,895	41.9
Reform	Ian Houlder	1,272	28.1
Green	Nicholas Jeffreys	595	13.1
Labour	Will Howman	394	8.7
Liberal Democrats	Helen Korfanty	371	8.2
Majority		623	13.8
Turnout		4,543	51.6
Registered electors		8,801	
Conservative win (new seat)			

Blackbourn
Party	Candidate	Votes	%	±%
Conservative	Harry Richardson	1,632	38.1	−32.6
Reform	Paul Brown	1,515	35.3	N/A
Green	Clare Higson	733	17.1	+1.5
Labour	Rowena Lindberg	408	9.5	−4.2
Majority		117	2.7	–52.4
Turnout		4,307	49.0	+7.6
Registered electors		8,789		
Conservative hold				

Brandon
Party	Candidate	Votes	%	±%
Reform	Tim Kent	1,427	42.8	N/A
Conservative	David Palmer	564	16.9	−21.9
Independent	Victor Lukaniuk*	492	14.8	−26.2
Green	Gemma Raymond	387	11.6	+6.5
Independent	Wayne Bland	212	6.4	N/A
Labour	Tony Blacker	150	4.5	−10.6
Liberal Democrats	Adam Robertson	103	3.1	N/A
Majority		863	25.9	N/A
Turnout		3,342	38.2	+9.8
Registered electors		8,741		
Reform gain from Independent				

Clare
Party	Candidate	Votes	%	±%
Conservative	Bobby Bennett*	1,516	36.3	−27.0
Reform	Warren Rodwell	1,461	35.0	N/A
Green	Jessica Sibley	541	13.0	−4.5
Liberal Democrats	Hugo Bovill	379	9.1	N/A
Labour	Adam Chadwick	274	6.6	−12.6
Majority		55	1.3	–42.8
Turnout		4,179	51.9	+10.8
Registered electors		8,058		
Conservative hold				

Eastgate & Moreton Hall
Party	Candidate	Votes	%	±%
Reform	Simon Aalders	1,070	28.2	N/A
Liberal Democrats	Andy McGowan	856	22.6	+19.6
Conservative	Birgitte Mager	794	21.0	−14.3
Labour	Cliff Waterman	537	14.2	+0.5
Green	Yarrow Jeffery	531	14.0	+4.3
Majority		214	5.6	N/A
Turnout		3,789	43.4	+5.5
Registered electors		8,729		
Reform gain from Conservative				

Exning & Newmarket
Party	Candidate	Votes	%	±%
Reform	Andrew Burton	1,101	30.3	N/A
Conservative	Ben Greening	955	26.3	−14.5
Liberal Democrats	Jon London	825	22.7	N/A
Green	Debbie Clarke	479	13.2	+4.2
Labour	Shelagh Kavanagh	272	7.5	−15.5
Majority		146	4.0	N/A
Turnout		3,649	38.7	+8.6
Registered electors		9,439		
Reform gain from Conservative				

Hardwick
Party	Candidate	Votes	%	±%
Conservative	Richard Rout*	1,701	47.8	−13.8
Reform	Sheila Burke	747	21.0	N/A
Green	Grahame Starling	544	15.3	+3.4
Labour Co-op	Judith Moore	353	9.9	−5.4
Liberal Democrats	James Porter	214	6.0	−5.2
Majority		954	26.8	–19.5
Turnout		3,561	51.4	+7.2
Registered electors		6,923		
Conservative hold				

Haverhill East & Rural
Party	Candidate	Votes	%
Reform	Luke O'Brien	1,268	35.1
Conservative	Nick Clarke	1,240	34.3
Green	Luke Stannett	496	13.7
Labour	Quinn Cox	371	10.3
Liberal Democrats	Chris Connor	237	6.6
Majority		28	0.8
Turnout		3,618	41.4
Registered electors		8,737	
Reform win (new seat)			

Haverhill North West & Withersfield
Party	Candidate	Votes	%
Conservative	Joe Mason	1,523	49.8
Reform	Heike Sowa*	781	25.6
Labour	Indy Wijenayaka	320	10.5
Green	Lizzie Eyre	319	10.4
Liberal Democrats	Jessica Tovey	113	3.7
Majority		742	24.3
Turnout		3,062	39.1
Registered electors		7,842	
Conservative win (new seat)			

Haverhill South
Party	Candidate	Votes	%
Reform	Paul Littman	990	38.9
Conservative	Graham Cone	657	25.8
Green	Mark Ereira	543	21.4
Labour	David Smith	353	13.9
Majority		333	13
Turnout		2,550	33.0
Registered electors		7,739	
Reform win (new seat)			

Mildenhall
Party	Candidate	Votes	%	±%
Reform	Louis Busuttil	1,189	35.1	N/A
Independent	Ian Shipp	1,043	30.7	N/A
Conservative	Lance Stanbury*	613	18.1	−22.0
Green	Claire Steed	294	8.7	+2.7
Labour	Roxanne Downes	147	4.3	−6.5
Liberal Democrats	Zigurds Kronbergs	74	2.2	−0.2
Independent	Chaz Chandler	32	0.9	N/A
Majority		146	4.3	N/A
Turnout		3,398	39.4	–6.0
Registered electors		8,631		
Reform gain from Conservative				

Newmarket & Red Lodge
Party	Candidate	Votes	%	±%
Reform	Adrian Whittle	1,272	36.5	N/A
Conservative	Andy Drummond	963	27.6	−19.3
Green	Doug Taylor	564	16.2	+7.9
Labour	Keith Holland	421	12.1	−6.8
Liberal Democrats	Katarina Keep	265	7.6	−0.4
Majority		309	8.9	N/A
Turnout		3,492	35.2	+9.5
Registered electors		9,917		
Reform gain from Conservative				

Row Heath
Party	Candidate	Votes	%	±%
Reform	Don Waldron	1,469	43.6	N/A
Conservative	Susan Glossop	860	25.5	−34.9
Green	Tom Moore	452	13.4	+2.0
Independent	David Taylor	406	12.1	N/A
Labour	Joyce Adenekan	181	5.4	−9.0
Majority		609	18.1	N/A
Turnout		3,377	39.6	+9.6
Registered electors		8,525		
Reform gain from Conservative				

St Olaves & Tollgate
Party	Candidate	Votes	%
Reform	Martin Robinson*	986	32.3
Green	Susie Dowling	922	30.2
Labour	Diane Hind	455	14.9
Conservative	Thomas Murray	379	12.4
Independent	David Nettleton*	310	10.2
Majority		64	2.1
Turnout		3,057	34.2
Registered electors		8,941	
Reform win (new seat)			

== Post-election changes ==
=== Bosmere by-election ===
Bosmere by-election, 12 November 2026 Resignation of Gary Keogh (Reform)
Party	Candidate	Votes	%	±%
Conservative	Kay Oakes	762	33.2	+13.8
Green	Adria Pittock	739	32.2	+2.8
Reform	Patrick Wegener	400	17.4	−16.1
Restore	Nigel Mills	182	7.9	New
Liberal Democrats	Attila Borzak	109	4.7	−8.4
Labour	Saffeen Yamulki	106	4.6	−0.1
Majority		23	1.0	−3.1
Turnout		2298	27.3	−17.3
Conservative gain from Reform		Swing	+14.95	
