= The Teazers =

British pop music group

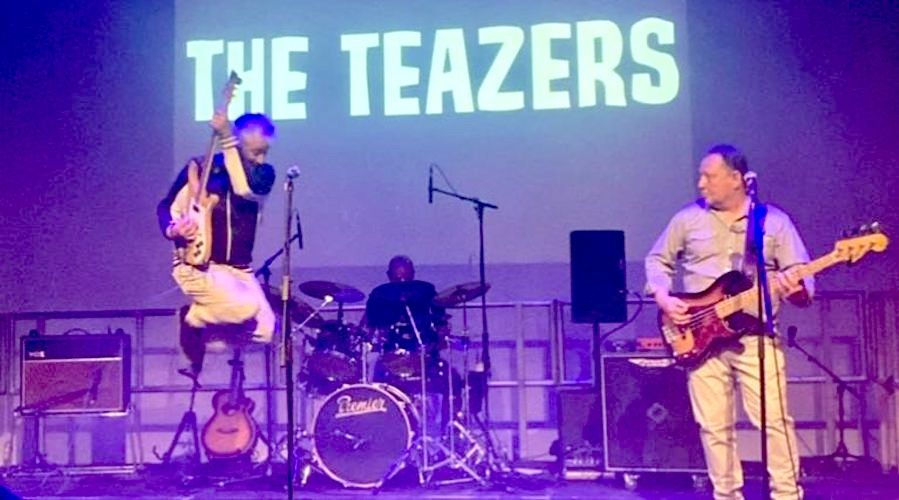
- The Teazers Live at 'Mods Mayday' - The Junction, Cambridge, 6 May 2024. From left to right: Paul Hopfensperger (guitar/vocals), Simon Rutherford (drums), Lee Jacobs (bass/backing vocals).

Background information
- Origin: Bury St Edmunds
- Genres: Mod revival, power pop
- Years active: 1978–1983, 2023–present
- Label: Hoffy Music Productions
- Members: Paul Hopfensperger (1978–1983, 2023–present)
- Past members: Nigel Stemp (1978–1980); Lee Jacobs (1978–1980, 2023–2024); Pete Hawtin (1981–1983); Andrew Leong-son (1981–1983); Simon Rutherford (2023–2024)
- Website: Theteazers.com

The Teazers are a 1970s British pop music group from Bury St Edmunds, Suffolk, commonly associated with the 1970s and early 1980s mod revival.

They formed in Bury St Edmunds, Suffolk in 1978, with lead singer/guitarist Paul Hopfensperger, bass player/backing vocalist Lee Jacobs and Nigel Stemp on drums. They were known for their Jam inspired sound.

== Career ==
Following the dis-banding of Phaze II in the mid 1970s, a band formed with David "Harry" Harris, Sean Oliver (who went on to form Rip Rig + Panic and worked with Terence Trent D'Arby on the album Introducing the Hardline According to Terence Trent D'Arby), Nick Pamment, Steven Gosbee and Paul Hopfensperger, 15 year old singer/guitarist Hopfensperger formed The Teazers in 1978 with his good friend from the Bury St Edmunds Swimming Club, Nigel Stemp, (13). They were joined by Hopfensperger's friend Lee Jacobs (15) on bass.

=== Gigs ===
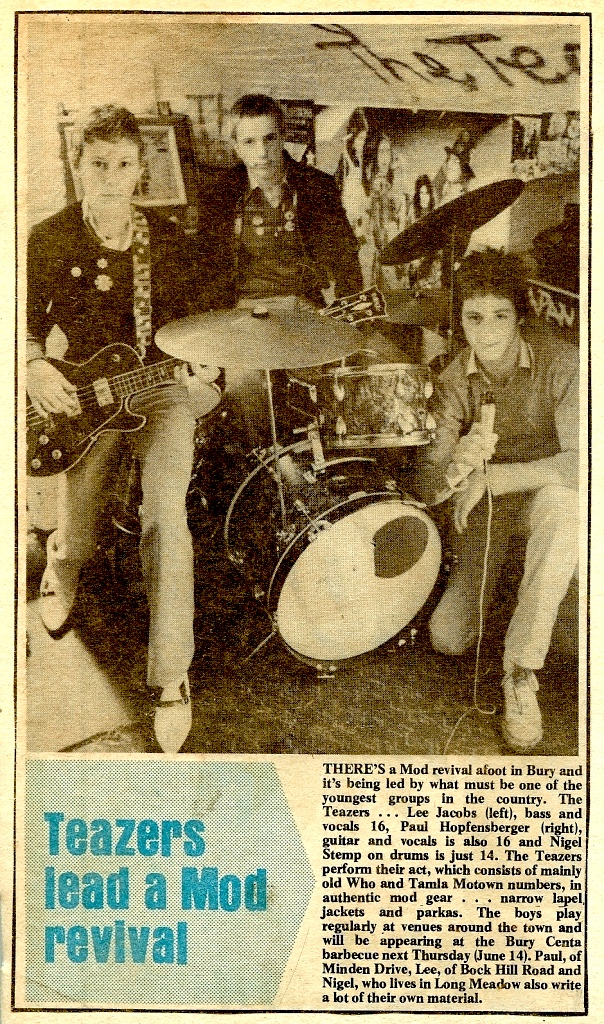
The Teazers lead a Mod revival - Article from The Citizen 1979. From left to right: Lee Jacobs (bass/backing vocals), Nigel Stemp (drums), Paul Hopfensperger (guitar/vocals).

Inspired by the punk movement at the time, but in particular by bands including Dr. Feelgood, The Beatles, The Who and The Jam, their first gig was a 'Rock Against Racism' (RAR) gig on 4 November 1978 at Lansbury House, in Bury St Edmunds which included their version of "Pretty Vacant". RAR was chosen to support Hopfensperger's friend and former Phaze II bandmate Sean Oliver who had suggested the idea to him after suffering racial abuse at school.

The young mod band played in some of the roughest pubs in Bury St Edmunds at the time, including the 'rockers' pub The Griffin on 18 May 1979. In the audience that night was Hopfensperger's former Phaze II bandmate David Harris. During the gig, Hopfensperger's amplifier blew up, with smoke coming from the amp. Immediately, a member of the audience took Hopfensperger and Harris to collect a new amplifier from Harris's home which enabled the band to continue their set, albeit with a 30 minute delay mid set. The local press headlined the gig as "Things went with a bang for the lads".

The band started to gain a large following in the town with regular sets at local venues including The Centa and The Drummond Centre in Bury St. Edmunds, and were soon picked up by the local press who published an article on them in June 1979 stating:

THERE'S a Mod revival afoot in Bury and it's being led by what must be one of the youngest groups in the country.

==== Rock festival for a new sports centre ====
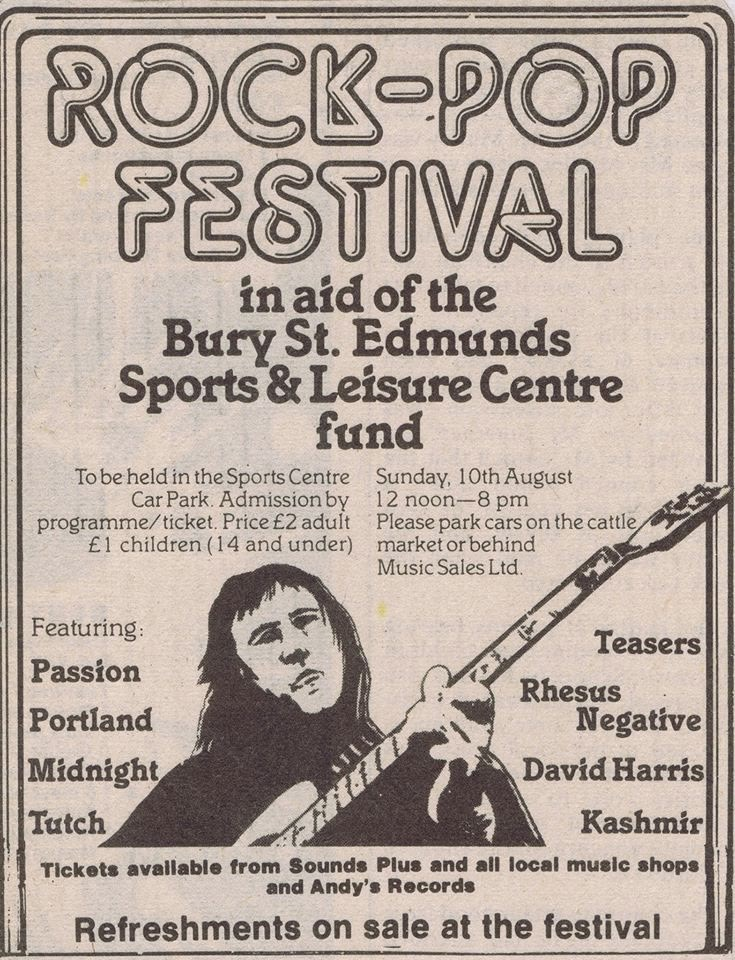
Rock-Pop Festival in aid of the Bury St Edmunds Sports Centre Rebuild Fund 1980

In 1980, the Bury St Edmunds Sports Centre was totally destroyed by a fire. The centre, the swimming pool in particular, was heavily used by both Hopfensperger and Stemp as part of their swimming training as Suffolk County level swimmers and members of the Bury St Edmunds Swimming Club. Devastated by the loss, the band decided to work with other local bands including Passion, Kashmir, Portland, Thumper, Tutch, David Harris, Rhesus Negative, and Midnight, to help in the only way they knew how, and set about organising an outdoor rock concert to help raise money for the rebuild, with Hopfensperger keen to rebuild the pool as an Olympic sized 50 Metre pool (it was then a non-standard 33 and 1/3 Metre pool). Totally out of the blue, just over a month before the concert, bass player Lee Jacobs decided to join the band Portland and the concert went ahead in the car park of the destroyed leisure centre without The Teazers. The band with the original line-up never played together again.

=== Second line-up ===
In late 1980, undeterred by the setback, Hopfensperger set out to re-build the band with a new lineup which included himself, then seventeen, fifteen year old Andrew Leong-son (bass) and fourteen year old Peter Hawtin (drums/backing vocals).

== Break up and reformation ==
The Teazers never officially dis-banded but did not play again after 1983 when their bass player from their second line-up, Andrew Leong-son, left to go to university. They re-formed with two of the three original band members, Paul Hopfensperger and Lee Jacobs and a new drummer, Simon Rutherford, for a Mods Mayday Concert in May 2024. The concert, which was at the Cambridge Junction in Cambridge, included 1970s mod bands The Face, The Killermeters, The Chords and Squire.

== Discography ==
=== Singles ===
- The System (1981)
- Dreaming of You (1981)
- The Shape of Things to Come (1981)
- Alison (1982)

=== EPs ===
- Teenage Angst (1982) - Cassette only, originally released as Life in The Modern World
- Teenage Angst (2018) - 12" Vinyl EP
- Teenage Angst (2022) - Digital Download released on all major streaming platforms
