= Tower Division, Suffolk =

Electoral division of Suffolk, England

Tower
- County Council constituency for the Suffolk County Council
- District: West Suffolk
- Region: East of England
- Population: 22,028 (2019)
- Electorate: 17,045 (2025)
- Major settlements: Bury St Edmunds Town Centre

Current constituency
- Created: 2005
- Seats: 2
- Councillor: David Nettleton (Independent); Martin Robinson (Reform)
- Local council: West Suffolk Council
- Created from: Northgate & St. Olaves, Risbygate & Sextons

Tower Division is an electoral division in Suffolk which returns two county councillors to Suffolk County Council.

== Geography ==
It is made up of the central and North West Bury St Edmunds and consists of the West Suffolk council wards of Miden, St Olaves, Tollgate, and Abbeygate along with a small part of Westgate ward between the River Linnet, Hospital Road, and Petticoat lane.

== History ==
The first elections for this division were held as part of the 2005 United Kingdom local elections, after the two seat Suffolk County Council division was created through The County of Suffolk (Electoral Changes) Order 2004. The first two councillors elected for this new division were David Lockwood (Labour) with 3,181 votes, and Paul Hopfensperger (Conservative) with 2,747 votes. To date, these are the highest number of votes received at any election for a Tower Division candidate.

The seats of the division are currently held by one Independent (formerly a Conservative party) councillor after David Nettleton defected to the Conservatives in December 2019 having been originally elected as an independent, then becoming an independent again in July 2025, and one Reform councillor, Martin Lewis Robinson. Robinson is the first ever Reform councillor to be elected in Suffolk, who won a by-election on July 3, 2025 following the death of Cllr Robert Everitt (Conservative) in April 2025.

== Members for Tower ==
Member	Party	Term	Member	Party	Term
David Lockwood	Labour	2005–2009	Paul Hopfensperger	Conservative	2005–2008
David Lockwood	Labour	2005–2009	Paul Hopfensperger	Independent	2008–2009
Paul Farmer	Conservative	2009–2010	Mark Ereira-Guyer	Green	2009–2017
Stefan Oliver	Conservative	2010–2013	Mark Ereira-Guyer	Green	2009–2017
David Nettleton	Independent	2013–2019	Mark Ereira-Guyer	Green	2009–2017
David Nettleton	Conservative	2019–2025	Robert Everitt	Conservative	2017–2025
David Nettleton	Conservative	2019–2025	Martin Robinson	Reform UK	2025–present
David Nettleton	Independent	2025–Present			

== Election results ==
=== Elections in the 2020s ===
2025 Suffolk County Council By-election: Tower
Party	Candidate	Votes	%	±%
Reform UK	Martin Robinson	1,332	28.8	N/a
Green	Clare Higson	1,155	25.0	▼
Conservative	Joanna Rayner	808	17.5	▼
Labour	Judith Moore	667	14.4	▼
Independent	Frank Stennett	407	8.8	▼
Liberal Democrats	James Porter	259	5.6	▲
Majority		177		
Rejected ballots		4	0.1	▼
Turnout		4,633	27.2	
Registered electors		17,045		▲551
Reform UK gain from Conservative		Swing		

2021 Suffolk County Council election: Tower
Party	Candidate	Votes	%	±%
Conservative	Robert Everitt *	2,277	33.7	+4.9
Conservative	David Nettleton *	2,104		
Green	Steph Holland	1,993	29.5	+7.4
Green	Matthew Rowe	1,489		
Labour	Donna Higgins	1,409	20.8	+5.2
Labour	Marilyn Sayer	830		
Independent	Frank Stennett	691	10.2	N/A
Liberal Democrats	David Poulson	269	4.0	–2.3
Communist	Darren Turner	120	1.8	N/A
Majority		284	4.2	+1.0
Rejected ballots		932	15.3	▲15.1
Turnout		6,090	36.9	▲3.8
Registered electors		16,494		▲928
Conservative hold		Swing	–1.2	
Conservative gain from Independent		Swing		

=== Elections in the 2010s ===
2017 Suffolk County Council election: Tower
Party	Candidate	Votes	%	±%
Conservative	Robert Everitt	1,833	22.9	+0.2
Independent	David Nettleton *	1,628	20.4	–5.4
Independent	Paul Hopfensperger	1,623	20.3	N/A
Green	Mark Ereira-Guyer *	1,406	17.6	–9.9
Labour	Quentin Cornish	998	12.5	–4.1
Labour	Alex Griffin	907		
Liberal Democrats	Julia Lale	507	6.3	–1.1
Liberal Democrats	Sheena Rawlings	173		
Majority		205	2.6	+7.3
Turnout		5,147	33.1	
Registered electors		15,566		
Conservative gain from Green		Swing	2.8	
Independent hold		Swing		

2013 Suffolk County Council election: Tower
Party	Candidate	Votes	%	±%
Green	Mark Ereira-Guyer *	1,481	23.2	–3.9
Independent	David Nettleton	1,389	21.8	–4.2
Conservative	Robert Everitt	1,227	19.3	–9.5
Conservative	Patsy Warby	1,008		
UKIP	Luke Levene	983	15.4	+15.4
Labour	Diane Hind	895	14.0	+5.0
Labour	Nicola Ridgeway	840		
UKIP	James Lumley	823		
Liberal Democrats	Judy Roadway	399	6.3	–2.8
Majority		162	1.4	–0.3
Turnout		6,374	29.6	–5.5
Green hold		Swing	+0.2	
Independent gain from Conservative		Swing	+2.7	

Tower By-Election 11 November 2010
Party	Candidate	Votes	%	±%
Conservative	Stefan Oliver	1,005	28.8	0.0
Independent	David Nettleton	950	27.2	+1.2
Labour	Kevin Hind	759	21.7	+12.6
Green	Pippa Judd	479	13.7	−13.4
Liberal Democrats	David Chappell	300	8.6	−0.4
Majority		55		
Turnout		3,505	20.9	
Conservative hold		Swing	−0.6	

=== Elections in the 2000s ===
2009 Suffolk County Council election: Tower
Party	Candidate	Votes	%	±%
Conservative	Paul Farmer	2,042	28.8	
Green	Mark Ereira-Guyer	1,924	27.1	
Independent	David Nettleton	1,846	26.0	
Conservative	Richard Rout	1,726		
Labour	Keith Waterson	645	9.1	
Liberal Democrats	Daniel Warren	641	9.9	
Labour	Kevin Hind	624		
Liberal Democrats	Allan Jones	605		
Majority		118 & 78	1.7	
Turnout		10,053	32.7	
Registered electors		15,576		
Conservative hold		Swing		
Green gain from Labour		Swing		

2005 Suffolk County Council election: Tower
Party	Candidate	Votes	%
Labour	David Lockwood *	3,181	32.7
Conservative	Paul Hopfensperger	2,747	28.3
Labour	Ray Nowak *	2,720	-
Conservative	Robert Everitt	2,663	-
Liberal Democrats	David Chappell	1,738	17.9
Liberal Democrats	Daniel Warren	1,266	-
UKIP	Brian Lockwood	801	8.2
Independent	David Nettleton	799	8.2
UKIP	Ivan Cook	509	-
Independent	Melinda Nettleton	498	-
Green	Adam Stacey	455	4.7
Green	Samantha Hunt Stacey	432	-
Majority		27	4.5
Turnout			68.6
Labour win (new seat)			
Conservative win (new seat)			
