= Center for Bronx Non-Profits =

- Abbreviation: CBNP
- Formation: 2012; 14 years ago
- Headquarters: The Bronx
- Location: New York City
- Parent organization: Hostos Community College
- Website: www.hostos.cuny.edu/Continuing-Ed/Center-for-Bronx-Nonprofits

The Center for Bronx Nonprofits (CBNP) at Hostos Community College was launched in 2012 as a community focused resource to meet the capacity building needs of Bronx-serving nonprofit organizations, with collaborative support from the Jewish Community Relations Council (JCRC) and initial funding from the JPMorgan Chase Foundation and The New York Community Trust. CBNP functions as an important support organization to Bronx nonprofits, facilitating opportunities for leadership and organizational development, and technical skills training. Their mission is to positively impact the quality of life for the members of the Bronx community by strengthening the capacity of Bronx nonprofits.

The center's main objectives are to develop a strong Bronx nonprofit leadership, foster healthy Bronx nonprofit organizations and to promote a vibrant Bronx nonprofit sector.

These goals by are achieved by offering a number of major program initiatives:

1. Executive Management Certificate
2. Leadership Development Peer Learning Network
3. Executive Director Breakfasts and Speaker Series
4. Capacity Building Consulting
5. CBNP Co-Learning Seminars and Satellite Capacity Building Workshops
6. “Mission Bronx” Public TV Show
7. Bronx Conversation Series
