= Human Body: Pushing the Limits =

Documentary (2008)

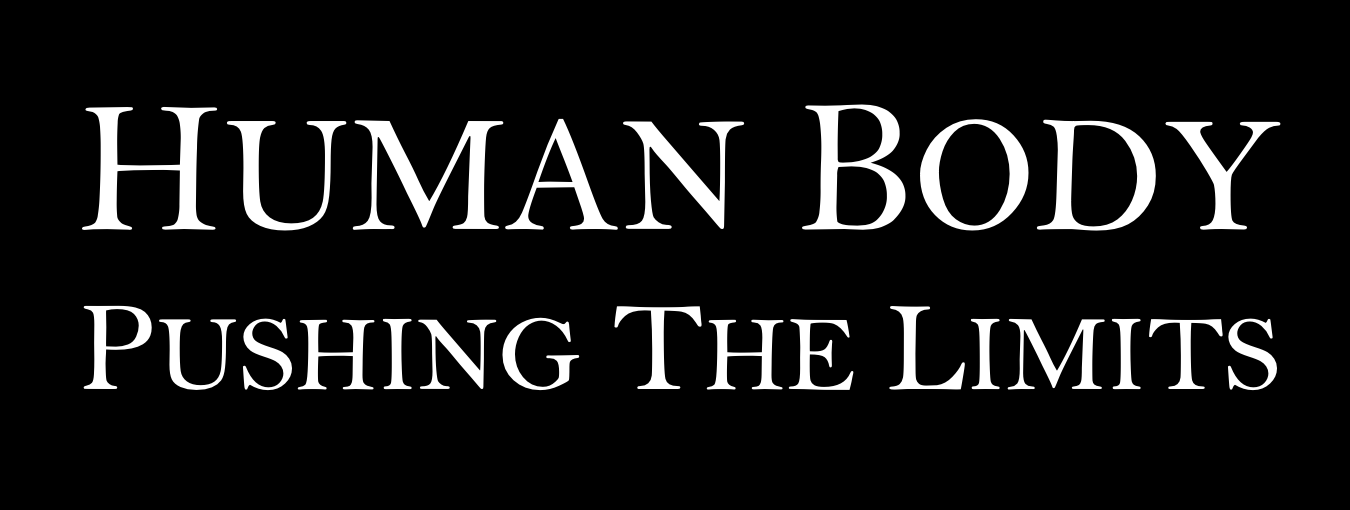
- Genre: Documentary
- Directed by: Dan Clifton; Mark Radice; Jeremy Turner
- Starring: Henry Garrett; Mark Webb; Tim Wallers; Paul Hopfensperger; Dailyn Matthews; Stéphane Cornicard; Gus Lynch; Todd Boyce
- Country of origin: United States
- Original language: English

Production
- Producers: Tyler Butterworth; Daniel Hall; Amy Kagelmacher; Richard Dale; Tim Goodchild; Martin Mortimore
- Production company: Dangerous Films Limited (United Kingdom) for Discovery Channel

Original release
- Release: March 2 – March 9, 2008

Human Body: Pushing the Limits is a four part television documentary series which was filmed in various locations across the globe and premiered on the Discovery Channel on March 2, 2008 in North America. The first two episodes aired March 2, and the final two aired March 9 at 9:00 p.m. and 10:00 p.m. E.S.T.

The show covers how the body reacts under extreme stress and details people's experiences using CGI.

It is made up of four episodes that all concentrate on certain aspects of the human body.

== Episodes ==
- Episode 1 - "Strength" - How the muscles react under stress. Includes stories of people lifting masses 6 times his or her weight, running at speeds that Olympic runners can't match and enduring nearly 14 hours swimming The English Channel from England to France in frigid water.
- Episode 2 - "Sight" - How the eyes can see better and with more detail in emergency situations (including lucid dreaming).
- Episode 3 - "Sensation" - Reactions to pain and similar sensations, as well as how techniques such as hypnosis, meditation, and focus can alter perception of them.
- Episode 4 - "Brain Power" - Focused on brain power and how it reacts to life threatening situations.

== Cast ==
=== "Sight" ===
- Bray Poor - Narrator
- Danny Wayne - Officer Stan Berry
- Randall Wuff - Michael May

=== "Strength" ===
- Bray Poor - Narrator
- Florian Hunter - Matt Sutter
- Sean Kinney - Singing
- Paul Hopfensperger - English Channel Swimmer (filmed 10 July 2007)
- Gus Lynch - Deputy Sheriff Dan Perkins

=== "Sensation" ===
- Bray Poor - Narrator
- Mark Webb - Spider Bite Victim
- Reed Rudy - Matt McGough
- Chelsea Rose - Shannon McGough
- Daily Matthews - Amy Racina
- Stephen Gregory Curtis - Fred Mason

=== "Brain Power" ===
- Bray Poor - Narrator
- Henry Garrett - Firefighter
- Todd Boyce - Firefighter
- Trevor White - Eric
- Sean Rees - Firefighter
- Stéphane Cornicard - Caver
- Tim Wallers - Balloon Explorer

== Critical response ==
The Hollywood Reporter called it "sensational,” with Marilyn Moss of the Associated Press stating "If you’re old enough, or have enough memory, Discovery Channel’s sensational ‘Human Body: Pushing the Limits’ will remind you of that quirky cinematic journey into the human anatomy we took in 1966 with ‘Fantastic Voyage,’ an epic science fiction adventure that had microscopic-size scientists Raquel Welch and Stephen Boyd swimming among blood cells while fighting off the human body’s more menacing viruses. This ‘Human Body’ peeps beneath our skin to show us how the body and the brain undergo fantastic changes — and mind-blowing feats — just to keep us active every day. This is hyper-reality TV."

El Editor Newspaper called it "visually stunning,” stating "We generally take our bodies for granted. Yet this complex machine that grew out of millions of years of evolution is as spellbinding as anything you can ever imagine. From the network that brought you the award winning series ‘Planet Earth’ comes yet another visually stunning spectacular ‘Human Body; Pushing the Limits,’ which will have viewers looking at their bodies in new and astonishing ways."

== Awards and nominations ==
The second episode of Human Body: Pushing the Limits - "Strength" was nominated for an Emmy at the 60th annual Academy of Television Arts & Sciences awards in 2008. Up against six very strong nominees (Battlestar Galactica "He That Believeth in Me", Heroes "Four Months Ago", Jericho "Patriots and Tyrants", Stargate Atlantis "Adrift" and Terminator: The Sarah Connor Chronicles "Pilot") the show lost out to eventual winner Battlestar Galactica "He That Believeth in Me".

Year	Group	Award	Recipient	Result	Refs
2008	Emmy Awards	Outstanding Special Visual Effects in a Season or a Movie	Episode: "Strength"	Nominated	
