= Paul S. Farmer =

British music educator

Paul Farmer MBE
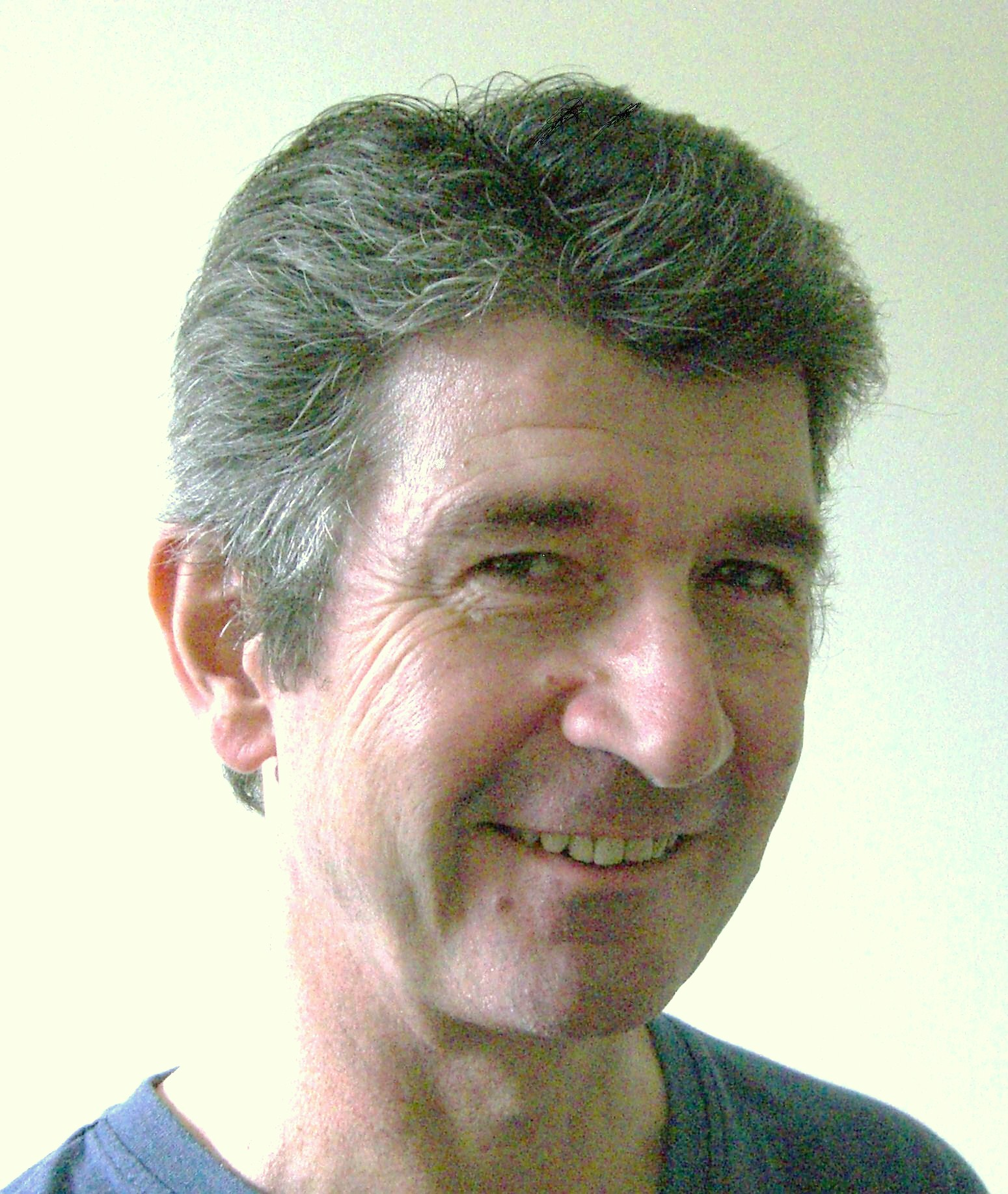
- 2009 Election photo
- Born: April 1950; Woodford Green, Essex, U.K.
- Died: May 5, 2023 (aged 73); Bury St Edmunds, Suffolk, U.K.
- Occupation: Retired
- Known for: Devising the first UK school exam in pop music
- Website: www.paulfarmer.com

Paul Stephen Farmer MBE was a British educationalist who developed the use of pop music in school music education in the 1970s, and is reputed to be the first to devise a public examination in the UK exclusively in pop music. He wrote several music education books and became a London comprehensive school head teacher at the age of 33.

== Education ==
Farmer was born in Woodford Green, Essex, the son of an examiner in HM Patent Office. After Woodford Green Preparatory School he won an LEA grant to Chigwell School, where he learnt to play the organ. He was accepted as an undergraduate by both the Royal College of Music and Royal Academy of Music and attended the former. There he gained the ARCM diploma and took the joint College and Academy graduate course (GRSM). He began his career as a secondary school music teacher and later studied part-time at London University’s Institute of Education, where he took both the Diploma and MA in Education.

== Awards and honours ==
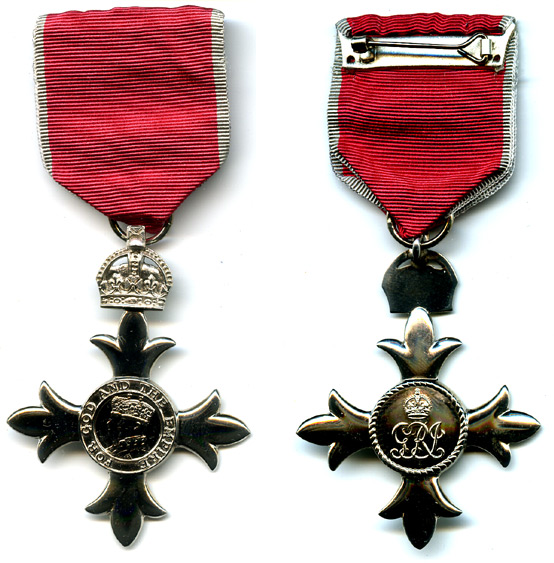
MBE (civil) medal

In 1997 the Chartered Management Institute admitted Farmer to membership as a Fellow (FCMI), recognising his work in school management. In December 2012 he became a Fellow of the Royal Society of Arts (FRSA) and the following June he was appointed MBE by HM The Queen in the Birthday Honours list, for services to the community in Suffolk.

== Teaching career ==
In 1974, after two years' teaching, Farmer was appointed Head of Music at Holland Park School, London, where he developed the use of pop music in music teaching. He created the first public examination in pop music, a mode III Certificate of Secondary Education (CSE) which was first administered in 1976. The exam was devised to motivate a group of fourth form pupils who did not want to follow the existing music exam course, including Angus Gaye (aka Drummie Zeb) who went on to form the reggae group Aswad.

Out of this course emerged what was claimed to be the first classroom textbook in pop music, Pop Workbook, co-written by Farmer and Tony Attwood and first published in 1978. Demand for the book led to its reprinting in 1979 and 1982. Alongside Holland Park's 4th/5th year course in pop music Farmer devised similar but broader modules for 11- to 14-year-olds which were later published as the Longman Music Topics. In 1979 the first edition of Farmer's book Music in the Comprehensive School was published, written for teachers and students of education, with a slightly larger second edition in 1984.

In 1981 Farmer became Deputy Head of Dick Sheppard School, a mixed comprehensive in Brixton noted for its left-wing activists on the teaching staff. He was subsequently appointed its Head Teacher at the age of 33 and was described as the Inner London Education Authority's (ILEA's) youngest head. His four years of headship were eventful (see WP entry for school) and after successfully applying for the headship of a larger school in 1987, he was eventually succeeded by Philip Lawrence QGM, who was murdered outside the school gates of his own subsequent headship.

== Later life ==
After the ILEA was abolished Farmer left London for Suffolk and held a number of part-time posts, teaching and examining music, including Choirmaster at Old Buckenham Hall prep school. He also founded and ran the first registered UK charity specialising in exclusively male health problems, The Men's Health Trust.

In 2003 Farmer was elected to St Edmundsbury Borough Council and Bury St Edmunds Town Council. He has served on St Edmundsbury's cabinet, first as Arts & Culture portfolio holder, where he immediately got embroiled in the "dangerous" headstone controversy and closing the Manor House Museum. The latter action was deeply unpopular with many of his electors and a possible reason that he lost votes in the 2007 election, though still winning by a comfortable majority. From May 2007 he became responsible for finance. He was elected to Suffolk County Council in 2009 and after a spell as town, borough and county councillor resigned from the county council and reduced his borough council responsibilities in 2010 for health reasons. He was re-elected to the historic town centre ward of Abbeygate on both St Edmundsbury borough council and Bury St Edmunds town council in May 2011 with nearly 60% of the votes cast.

== Personal life ==
In February 2015 Farmer announced that he would not be seeking re-election in May 2015 due to ill health, at the time saying he had decided to ‘give way to someone younger and fitter’.

=== Death ===
In May 2023, Farmer died at the age of 73.

== Main published works ==
- Attwood, Tony; Paul Farmer (1978). Pop Workbook. Edward Arnold. ISBN 978-0-7131-0155-3.
- Farmer, Paul (1979). Music in the Comprehensive School. Oxford University Press. ISBN 978-0-19-317418-4.
- Farmer, Paul (1982). A Handbook of Composers and Their Music. Oxford University Press. ISBN 978-0-19-321092-9.
- Farmer, Paul, ed. (1984). Music in Practice: A Collection of Music Projects for the Comprehensive School. Oxford University Press. ISBN 978-0-19-321094-3.

Series

- Longman Music Topics A series of classroom booklets, Longman 1979-1986, including:
  - Into the Classics. Longman. 1979. ISBN 0-582-21576-5.
  - Pop. Longman. 1979. ISBN 0-582-21577-3.
  - Ragtime and Blues. Longman. 1979. ISBN 0-582-21579-X.
  - Recording and Electronics. Longman. 1979. ISBN 0-582-21578-1.
  - Into the Modern Classics. Longman. 1981. ISBN 0-582-20096-2.
  - Steelbands and Reggae. Longman. 1981. ISBN 0-582-20097-0.
  - Instruments of the Orchestra. Longman. 1982. ISBN 0-582-20018-0.
  - The Story of Pop. Longman. 1982. ISBN 978-0-582-20017-3.
  - Instruments in Pop and Jazz. Longman. 1985. ISBN 0-582-20218-3.
  - (with F. Reilly) Music in Show Business. Longman. 1986. ISBN 0-582-20217-5.
