= Hardwick Division, Suffolk =

Electoral division of Suffolk, England

Hardwick
- County Council constituency for the Suffolk County Council
- District: West Suffolk
- Region: East of England
- Population: 8,841 (2019)
- Electorate: 6,692 (2021)
- Major settlements: Hardwick, Horringer Court, West Suffolk Hospital

Current constituency
- Created: 2005
- Seats: 1
- Councillor: Richard Rout (Conservative)
- Local council: West Suffolk Council
- Created from: Southgate & Westgate

Hardwick Division is an electoral division in Suffolk which returns one county councillor to Suffolk County Council.

== Geography ==
The division is almost entirely urban and contains the southern parts of the town of Bury St Edmunds. The population of the division is more elderly than the England average.

== History ==
The successor to the Southgate & Westgate division, it has typically been the strongest division in Bury St Edmunds for the Conservative.

== Boundaries and boundary changes ==
=== 2005–present ===
- St Edmundsbury District Wards of Southgate, Westgate.

== Members for Hardwick ==
Member	Party	Term
Stefan Oliver	Conservative	2005–2009
Craig Dearden-Phillips	Liberal Democrats	2009–2013
Sarah Stamp	Conservative	2013–2017
Richard Rout	Conservative	2017–present

== Election results ==
=== Elections in the 2020s ===
2021 Suffolk County Council election:
Party	Candidate	Votes	%	±%
Conservative	Richard Rout *	1,806	61.6	+2.9
Labour	James Macpherson	448	15.3	–1.2
Green	Chris Dexter-Mills	350	11.9	+3.9
Liberal Democrats	Helen Korfanty	329	11.2	–5.6
Majority		1,358	46.3	+4.4
Turnout		2,956	44.2	+2.2
Registered electors		6,692		–8
Conservative hold		Swing	+2.1	
