= Western Suffolk =

- Proposed unitary authority area
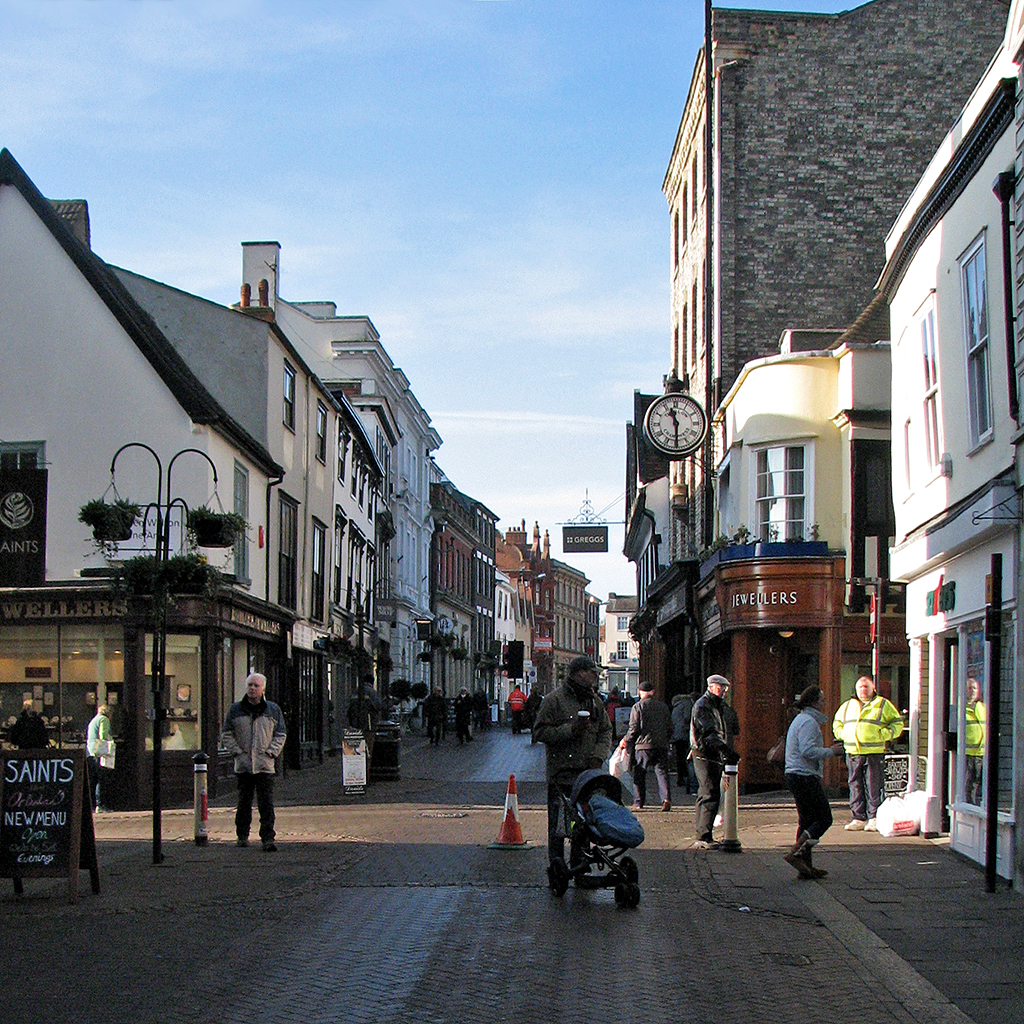
- Bury St Edmunds

- Western Suffolk shown within Suffolk
- Interactive map
- Coordinates: 52.2514°N 0.6969°E
- Sovereign state: United Kingdom
- Country: England
- Region: East
- Ceremonial county: Suffolk

Government
  - Type: Unitary authority
  - Body: Western Suffolk Council

Area
  - Total: 598.3 sq mi (1,549.6 km^{2})

Population (2024 estimate)
  - Total: 268,568
- Time zone: UTC+0 (GMT)
  - Summer (DST): UTC+1 (BST)

Western Suffolk or West Suffolk was a proposed unitary authority area in the ceremonial county of Suffolk, England. It would have been formed from the West Suffolk district, 21 parishes from Mid Suffolk and Babergh less 31 parishes. There would have been elections in May 2027 and the new unitary would have been created in 2028. In 2021 the population of the area was 254,700.

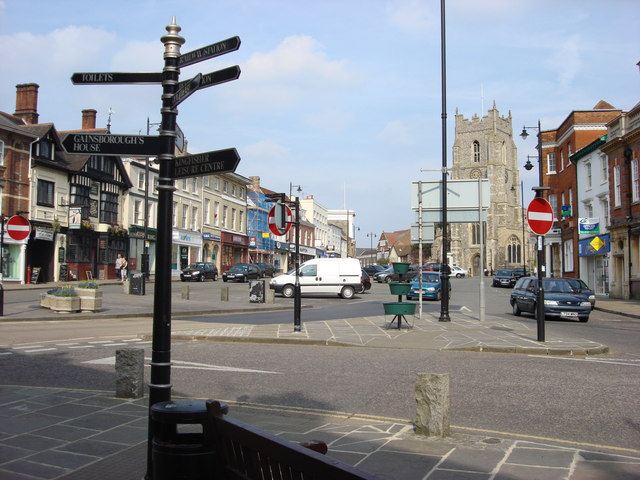
Sudbury

It was being formed as part of ongoing local government changes throughout England, in which all areas of the country that have separate county councils and district councils will see those replaced with single-tier, or unitary, local governance. The alternative proposal for a single unitary council was not chosen.

Plans to create it were withdrawn in September 2026. The decision was threatened with judicial review by Suffolk County Council.

== Parishes and settlements ==
The largest settlement in the district will be Bury St Edmunds, the whole of the district is currently parished. It will contain the following civil parishes:

- Acton, Alpheton, Ampton, Assington
- Badwell Ash, Bardwell, Barnardiston, Barnham, Barningham, Barrow, Barton Mills, Beck Row, Holywell Row and Kenny Hill, Beyton, Bildeston, Botesdale, Boxford, Boxted, Bradfield Combust with Stanningfield, Bradfield St Clare, Bradfield St George, Brandon, Brent Eleigh, Brettenham, Brockley, Bures St Mary, Bury St Edmunds
- Cavendish, Cavenham, Chedburgh, Chelsworth, Chevington, Chilton, Clare, Cockfield, Coney Weston, Cowlinge, Culford
- Dalham, Denham, St Edmundsbury, Denston, Depden, Drinkstone
- Edwardstone, Elmswell, Elveden, Eriswell, Euston, Exning
- Fakenham Magna, Felsham, Flempton, Fornham All Saints, Fornham St Genevieve, Fornham St Martin, Freckenham
- Gazeley, Gedding, Glemsford, Great Ashfield, Great Barton, Great Bradley, Great Cornard, Great Livermere, Great Thurlow, Great Waldingfield, Great Whelnetham, Great Wratting, Groton
- Hargrave, Hartest, Haverhill, Hawkedon, Hawstead, Hengrave, Hepworth, Herringswell, Hessett, Higham, Hinderclay, Hitcham, Honington, Hopton, Horringer, Hundon, Hunston
- Icklingham, Ickworth, Ingham, Ixworth, Ixworth Thorpe
- Kedington, Kentford, Kersey, Kettlebaston, Knettishall
- Lackford, Lakenheath, Langham, Lavenham, Lawshall, Leavenheath, Lidgate, Lindsey, Little Bradley, Little Cornard, Little Livermere, Little Thurlow, Little Waldingfield, Little Whelnetham, Little Wratting, Long Melford
- Market Weston, Milden, Mildenhall, Monks Eleigh, Moulton
- Nayland-with-Wissington, Nedging-with-Naughton, Newmarket, Newton, Norton, Nowton
- Ousden
- Pakenham, Polstead, Poslingford, Preston St Mary
- Red Lodge, Rede, Redgrave, Rickinghall Inferior, Rickinghall Superior, Risby, Rushbrooke with Rougham
- Santon Downham, Sapiston, Semer, Shimpling, Somerton, Stansfield, Stanstead, Stanton, Stoke-by-Clare, Stoke-by-Nayland, Stowlangtoft, Stradishall, Sudbury, The Saxhams
- Thelnetham, Thorpe Morieux, Thurston, Timworth, Tostock, Troston, Tuddenham
- Walsham le Willows, Wangford, Wattisfield, Wattisham, West Stow, Westley, Whatfield, Whepstead, Wickhambrook, Withersfield, Wixoe, Woolpit, Wordwell, Worlington

== Governance ==
The local authority would have been Western Suffolk Council. The first councillors would have been elected in May 2027. This election was cancelled in September 2026.

== See also ==
- Central and Eastern Suffolk
- Ipswich and South Suffolk
