= Risbridge Hundred =

Hundred of Suffolk, England

Coordinates: 52.1°N 0.6°E

Risbridge Hundred

Risbridge is a hundred of Suffolk, consisting of 58,468 acres (236.61 km^{2}).

Risbridge Hundred forms the south western corner of Suffolk extending 15 miles (24 km) from north to south and between 4 and 9 miles (14 km) in breadth. It is bounded on the west by Cambridgeshire on the south by Essex, on the east by Babergh and Thingoe Hundreds and on the north by Lackford Hundred. It is in the Franchise or Liberty of St Edmund, in the Archdeaconry of Sudbury, Deanery of Clare and Diocese of Ely.

The southern boundary with Essex is formed by the River Stour and the hundred is crossed by a number of streams. It is generally a fertile agricultural area with predominantly clay soil. The major towns in the hundred are Clare and Haverhill.

Listed as Risebruge in the Domesday Book, the meaning of the name is not fully understood but probably "Hrisa's bridge" or a similar personal name. The bridge in question would almost certainly have crossed the Stour, an important crossing at a time when bridges were rare. However similar place-names (ex: Ricebridge near Leigh in Surrey, Risbro in Sweden) are believed to have been bridges with a causeway over marshy land made from brushwood (ris) held by wooden pegs.

== Parishes ==
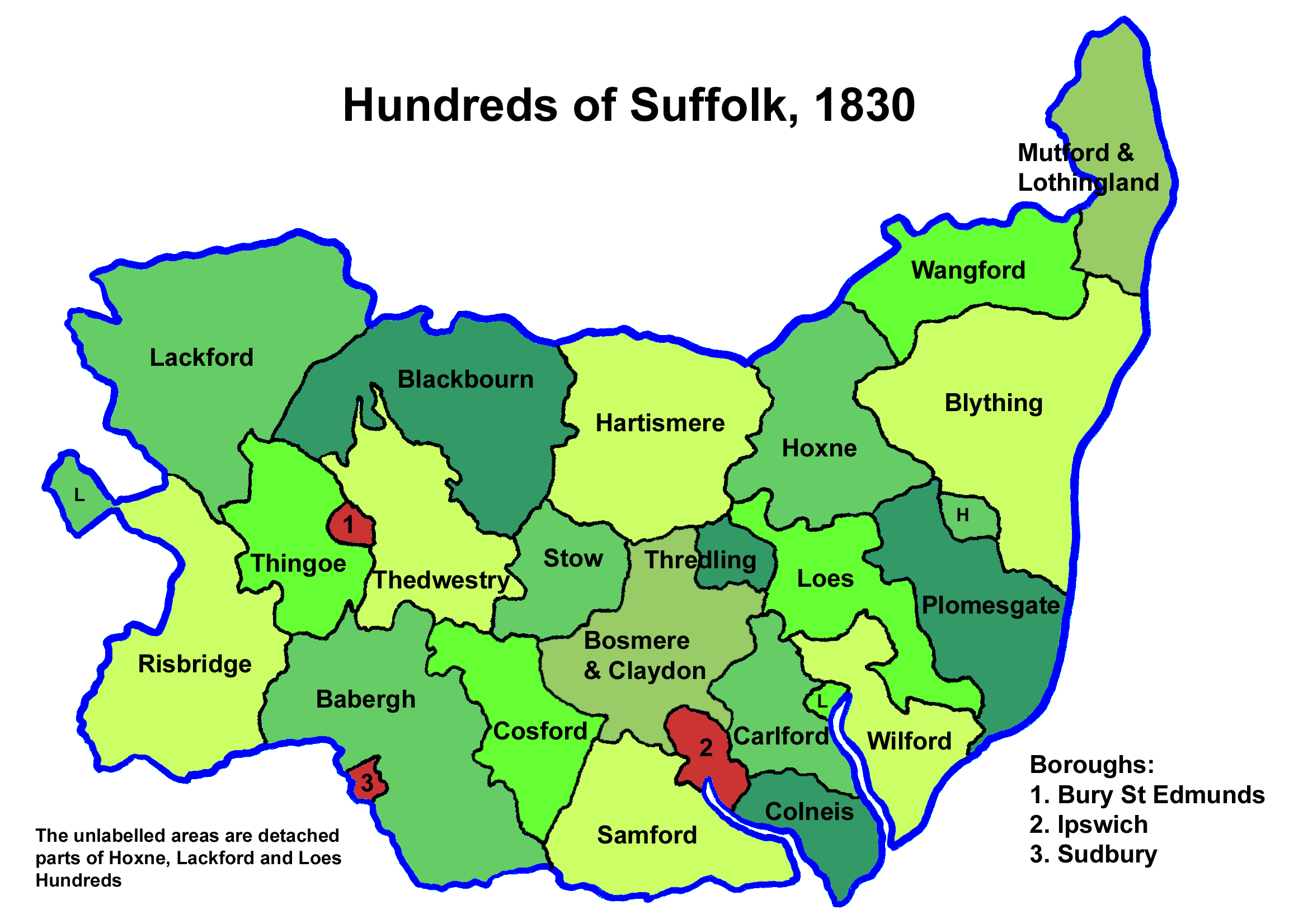
Suffolk hundreds

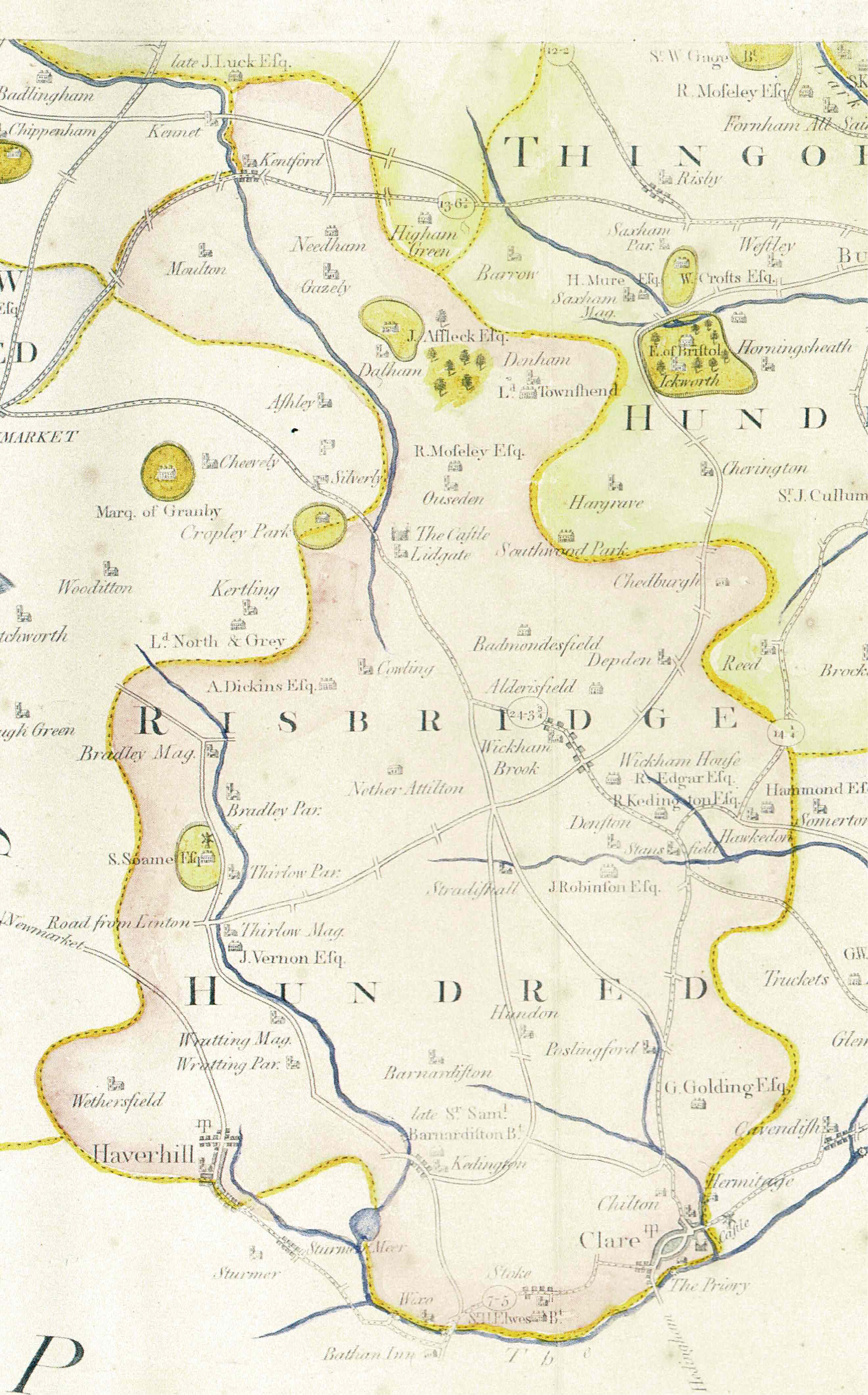
Risbridge Hundred, (Kirby 1766)

Risbridge Hundred consisted of the following 32 parishes and hamlets:

| Parish | Area (acres) |
|---|---|
| Barnardiston | 1085 |
| Chedburgh | 508 |
| Clare | 2178 |
| Cowlinge | 3000 |
| Dalham | 2080 |
| Denham | 1990 |
| Denston | 1230 |
| Depden | 1523 |
| Gazeley | 2270 |
| Great Bradley | 2204 |
| Great Thurlow | 1928 |
| Great Wratting | 1330 |
| Haverhill | 1817 |
| Hawkedon | 1210 |
| Higham Green | 2500 |
| Hundon | 4000 |
| Kedington | 1600 |
| Kentford | 800 |
| Lidgate | 1957 |
| Little Bradley | 958 |
| Little Thurlow | 1357 |
| Little Wratting | 950 |
| Moulton | 3073 |
| Needham, Suffolk | 900 |
| Ousden | 1490 |
| Poslingford | 2300 |
| Stansfield | 1850 |
| Stoke-by-Clare | 2330 |
| Stradishall | 1400 |
| Wickhambrook | 4000 |
| Withersfield | 2059 |
| Wixoe | 600 |
