= Wratting =

Wratting may refer to the following places in England:

- Great Wratting, Suffolk
- Little Wratting, Suffolk
- West Wratting, Cambridgeshire
