= Hargrave, Suffolk =

Village in Suffolk, England

Coordinates: 52.206°N 0.589°E

Hargrave
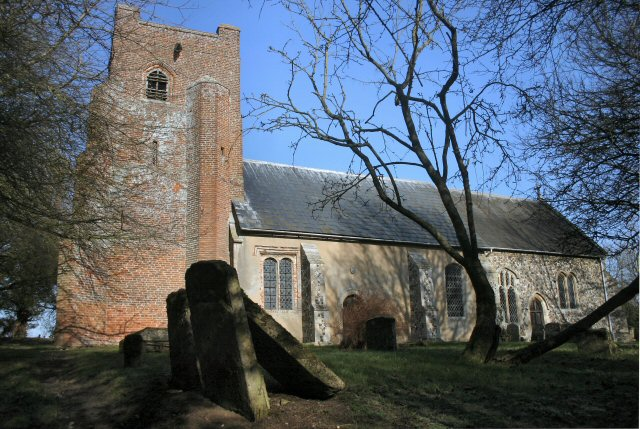
- St Edmund Church

- Location within Suffolk
- Population: 310 (2011)
- District: West Suffolk
- Shire county: Suffolk
- Region: East
- Country: England
- Sovereign state: United Kingdom
- Post town: Bury St Edmunds
- Postcode district: IP29

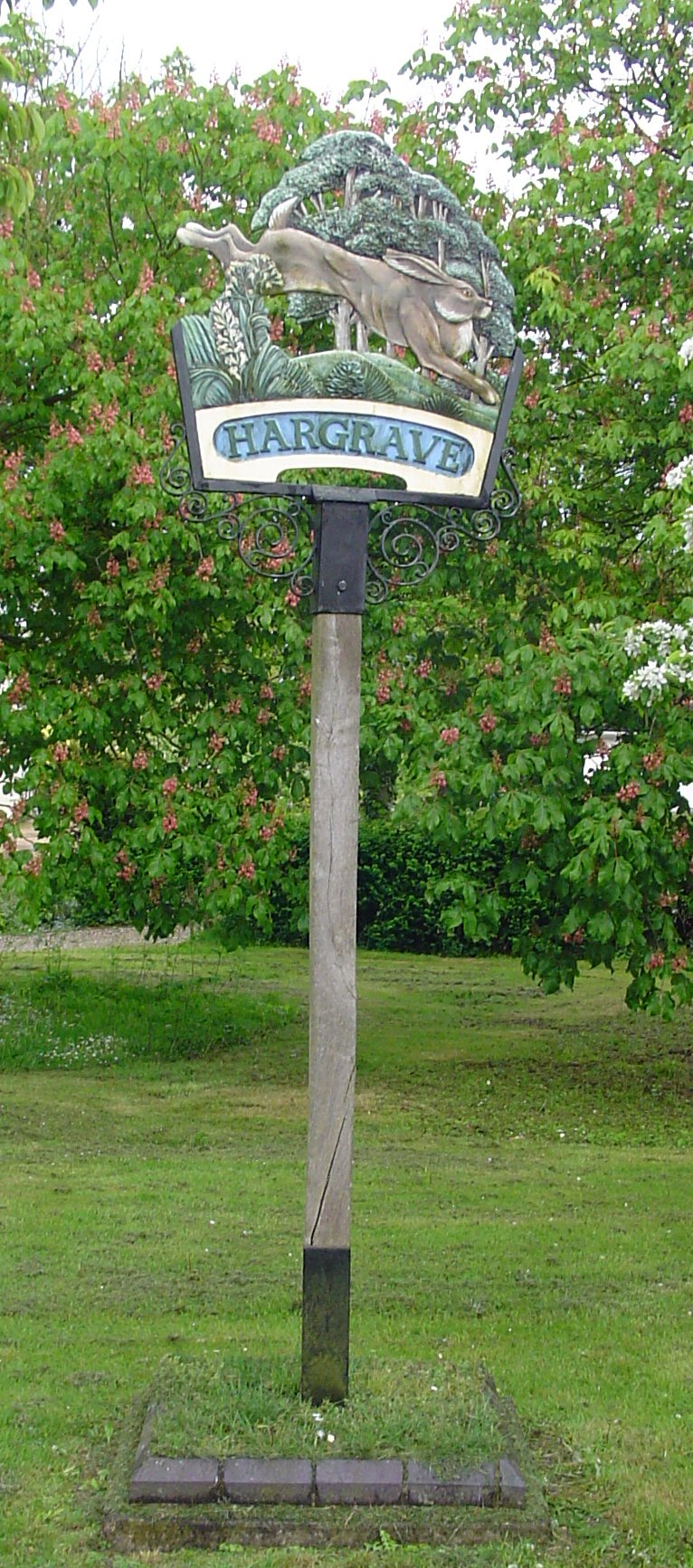
Signpost in Hargrave

Hargrave is a village and civil parish in the West Suffolk district of Suffolk in eastern England, located about 7 miles (10 km) away from south west of Bury St Edmunds. It lies at the crossroads from Ousden and Lady's Green (west), Chevington (east), Barrow, Suffolk (north), and Wickhambrook (in the south).

The village has approximately 120 dwellings, two churches and a village hall (built and funded by the village).

== History ==
Around the turn of the first millennium, East Anglia was continuously being ravaged by invading Danes, leading to questions as to whether the nineteen local residents recorded in the Domesday Survey (1086) were surviving East Angles or were of Scandinavian origin. Prior to the Norman Conquest, the manor lands of Haragraua (Hares Grove) had been held by Aluiet, one of four freewomen of West Suffolk. The Anglo Saxon form of the name is Haran-grafa with Haran meaning "hare" and grafa meaning "grave" or "trench". It is recorded that she held 480 acres (1.9 km^{2}) of land and the church. Some four fifths of the medieval churches of Suffolk were already in existence at the time of the Conquest, and it is probable that Hargrave was one of them, although the oldest surviving fabric of the building dates from the Norman period of architecture. It is also probable that a medieval hall existed in the vicinity of the present church and hall (although the existing Hargrave Hall dates from mid-sixteenth century), and that its nineteen early residents also lived in that area. These residents predominantly worked in sheep and pig farming.

Following the Conquest, the manor became one of more than three hundred holdings of the abbey, held at the time of Domesday by William De Waterville and subsequently, by the monks, Ralph the Falconer of Barrow and Robert Payne. At the time of the dissolution of the monasteries, it passed to Sir Thomas Kitson, and in 1717 was sold to the Earl of Bristol to become part of the Ickworth Estate.

In 1912, the area of land under cultivation in Hargrave was 1,781 acres (7.21 km^{2}), a mere twenty percent increase in the eight hundred years that had elapsed since Domesday. The population of the village developed equally slowly, and for the first five hundred years following the Domesday record, it was virtually static. It then grew to 324 during the next three hundred years, due to the change in agriculture towards corn farming, and reached its peak of 520 in 1861. From then, the great depression in agriculture caused an exodus from the villages to the towns. Hargrave's population decreased to 264 by 1931, and has remained approximately the same since.

There has been a marked change in the occupations of the residents of the village. Two hundred years ago, 86 people from 64 families were engaged in agriculture, and in 1931, 77% of the families were similarly employed. Today, less than one tenth of its residents are employed on the farms in the village. More than double that number are employed outside the village in retail and services industries, and in public sector and local government occupations. Almost three-quarters of its working residents commute to their place of work.

== Demography ==
According to the Office for National Statistics, at the time of the 2001 United Kingdom census, Hargrave had a population of 273 with 110 households. increasing to a population of 310 in 120 households at the 2011 census.

=== Population change ===
Population growth in Hargrave from 1801 to 1891
Year	1801	1811	1821	1831	1841	1851	1881	1891
Population	324	313	360	394	457	489	420	378
Source: A Vision of Britain Through Time

Population growth in Hargrave from 1901 to 2001
Year	1901	1911	1921	1931	1951	1961	2001	2011
Population	337	304	252	264	238	228	273	310
Source: A Vision of Britain Through Time
