= West Suffolk District =

West Suffolk
- Non-metropolitan district
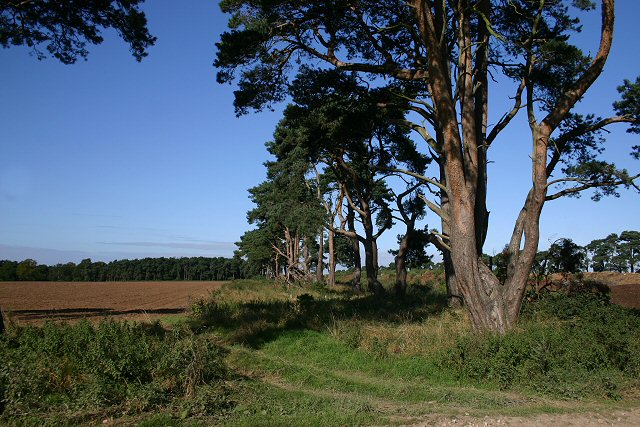
- Countryside at Elveden

- Coat of arms

- West Suffolk district within Suffolk
- Coordinates: 52.2514°N 0.6969°E
- Sovereign state: United Kingdom
- Constituent country: England
- Region: East of England
- Non-metropolitan county: Suffolk
- Status: Non-metropolitan district
- Admin HQ: Bury St Edmunds
- Incorporated: 1 April 2019

Government
  - Type: Non-metropolitan district council
  - Body: West Suffolk Council

Area
  - Total: 400 sq mi (1,035 km^{2})
  - Rank: 24th of 296

Population (2025)
  - Total: 189,407
  - Rank: 115th of 296
  - Density: 474.0/sq mi (183.0/km^{2})
  - Rank: 253rd of 296

Ethnicity (2021)
  - Ethnic groups: List: 91.8% White; 2.7% Mixed; 2.6% Asian; 1.6% Black; 1.3% other

Religion (2021)
  - Religion: List: 48.4% Christianity; 42.6% no religion; 8% other; 1% Islam
- Time zone: UTC0 (GMT)
  - Summer (DST): UTC+1 (BST)

West Suffolk District is a local government district in Suffolk, England. It was established in 2019 as a merger of the previous Forest Heath District with the Borough of St Edmundsbury. The council is based in Bury St Edmunds, the district's largest town. The district also contains the towns of Brandon, Clare, Haverhill, Mildenhall and Newmarket, along with numerous villages and surrounding rural areas. In 2021 it had a population of 180,820.

The neighbouring districts are Mid Suffolk, Babergh, Braintree, South Cambridgeshire, East Cambridgeshire, King's Lynn and West Norfolk and Breckland.

== History ==
Prior to West Suffolk's creation, its predecessors Forest Heath District Council and St Edmundsbury Borough Council had been working together for a number of years, having shared a joint chief executive since 2011. The two districts were formally merged into a new district of West Suffolk with effect from 1 April 2019.

The new district has the same name as the former administrative county of West Suffolk, which was abolished in 1974 under the Local Government Act 1972, but the new district covers a slightly smaller area than the pre-1974 county, which had also included areas now in the Babergh and Mid Suffolk districts.

In March 2026, the government announced plans to abolish the district in 2028 as part of local government reorganisation across Suffolk. These proposals were withdrawn in September 2026.

== Governance ==
West Suffolk Council

Type
- Type: Non-metropolitan district

History
- Founded: 1 April 2019
- Preceded by: St Edmundsbury; Forest Heath

Leadership
- Chair: Peter Armitage, Labour since 12 May 2026
- Leader: Cliff Waterman, Labour since 23 May 2023
- Chief Executive: Ian Gallin since 1 April 2019

Structure
- Seats: 64 councillors
- Political groups: Administration (32) Labour (15) Independent (8) West Suffolk Ind. (8) Liberal Democrats (1) Opposition (32) Conservative (24) Independent (3) Reform UK (3) Green (2)

Elections
- Voting system: Plurality block voting
- Last election: 4 May 2023
- Next election: 6 May 2027

Meeting place
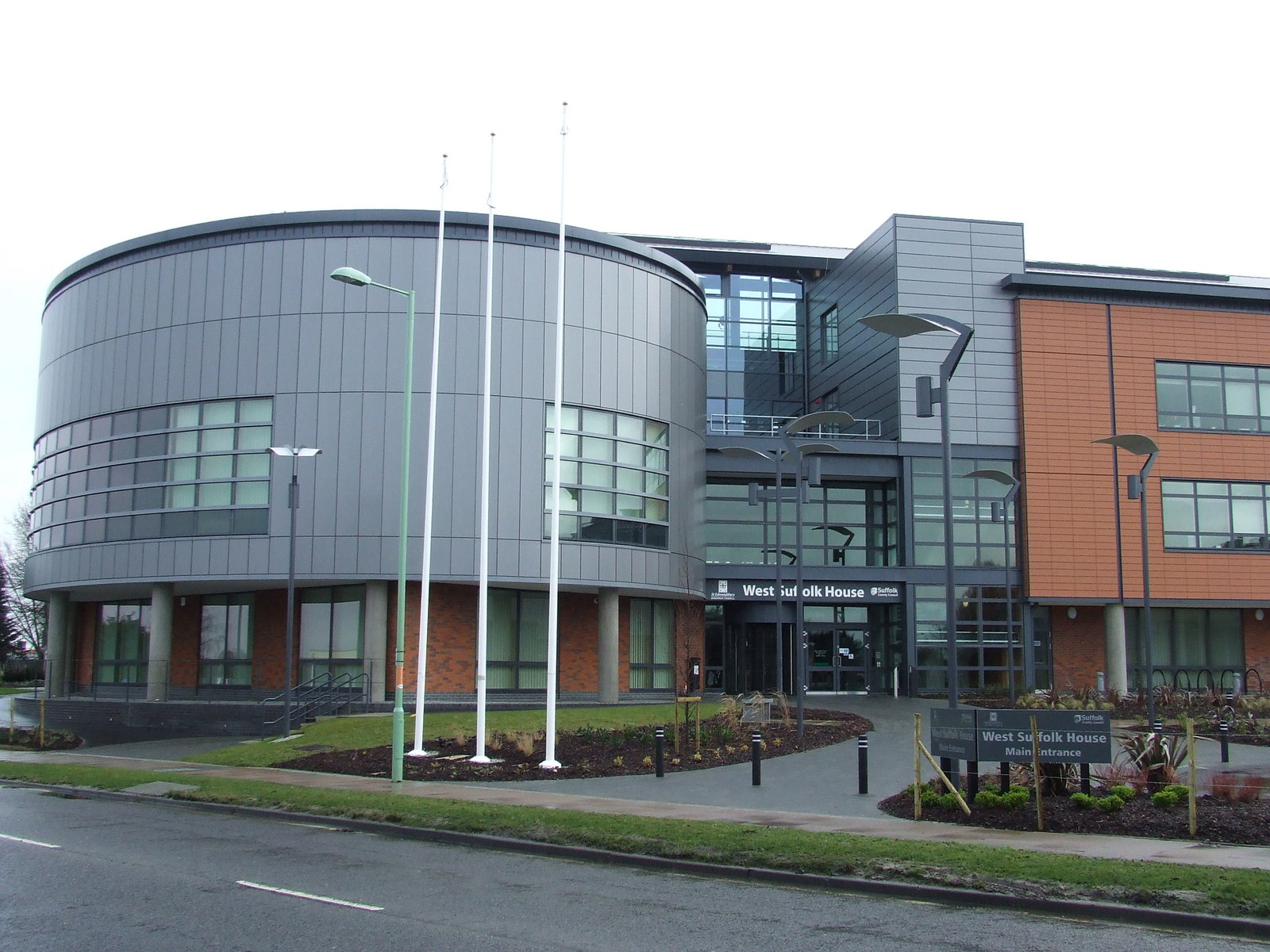
- West Suffolk House, Western Way, Bury St Edmunds, IP33 3YU

Website
- www.westsuffolk.gov.uk

West Suffolk Council provides district-level services. County-level services are provided by Suffolk County Council. The whole district is also covered by civil parishes, which form a third tier of local government.

=== Political control ===
The council has been under no overall control since the 2023 election. A coalition of Labour, the West Suffolk Independents, Liberal Democrats, Greens and independent councillors formed after the election, led by Labour councillor Cliff Waterman. The Greens left the coalition in November 2026 after a directive from the national Labour Party to local parties not to work with the Greens.

A shadow authority comprising the councillors of both outgoing councils was established to oversee the transition to the new authority. The first elections to the new council were held on 2 May 2019, a few weeks after the new district had been created. Political control of the council since 2019 has been as follows:

Party in control	Years
Conservative	2019–2023
No overall control	2023–present

=== Leadership ===
The first leader of the council appointed after the first election in 2019 was John Griffiths, who was the last leader of St Edmundsbury Borough Council. The leaders since 2019 have been:

Councillor	Party	From	To
John Griffiths	Conservative	22 May 2019	23 May 2023
Cliff Waterman	Labour	23 May 2023	

=== Composition ===
Following the 2023 election and subsequent changes of allegiance up to July 2024, the composition of the council was:

Party	Councillors
Conservative	25
Labour	15
Independent	11
West Suffolk Independents	8
Reform	3
Green	1
Liberal Democrats	1
Total	64

The Labour, Liberal Democrat and one of the independent councillors sit together as the "Progressive Alliance" group, and the West Suffolk Independents and seven other independent councillors sit together as the "Independents Group". These two groups together form the council's administration. The next election is due in 2027.

=== Premises ===
The council is based at West Suffolk House on Western Road in Bury St Edmunds. The building had been completed in 2009 for the former St Edmundsbury Borough Council, also incorporating offices for Suffolk County Council.

=== Elections ===
The council comprises 64 councillors representing 43 wards, with each ward electing one, two or three councillors. Elections are held every four years.

== Towns and parishes ==
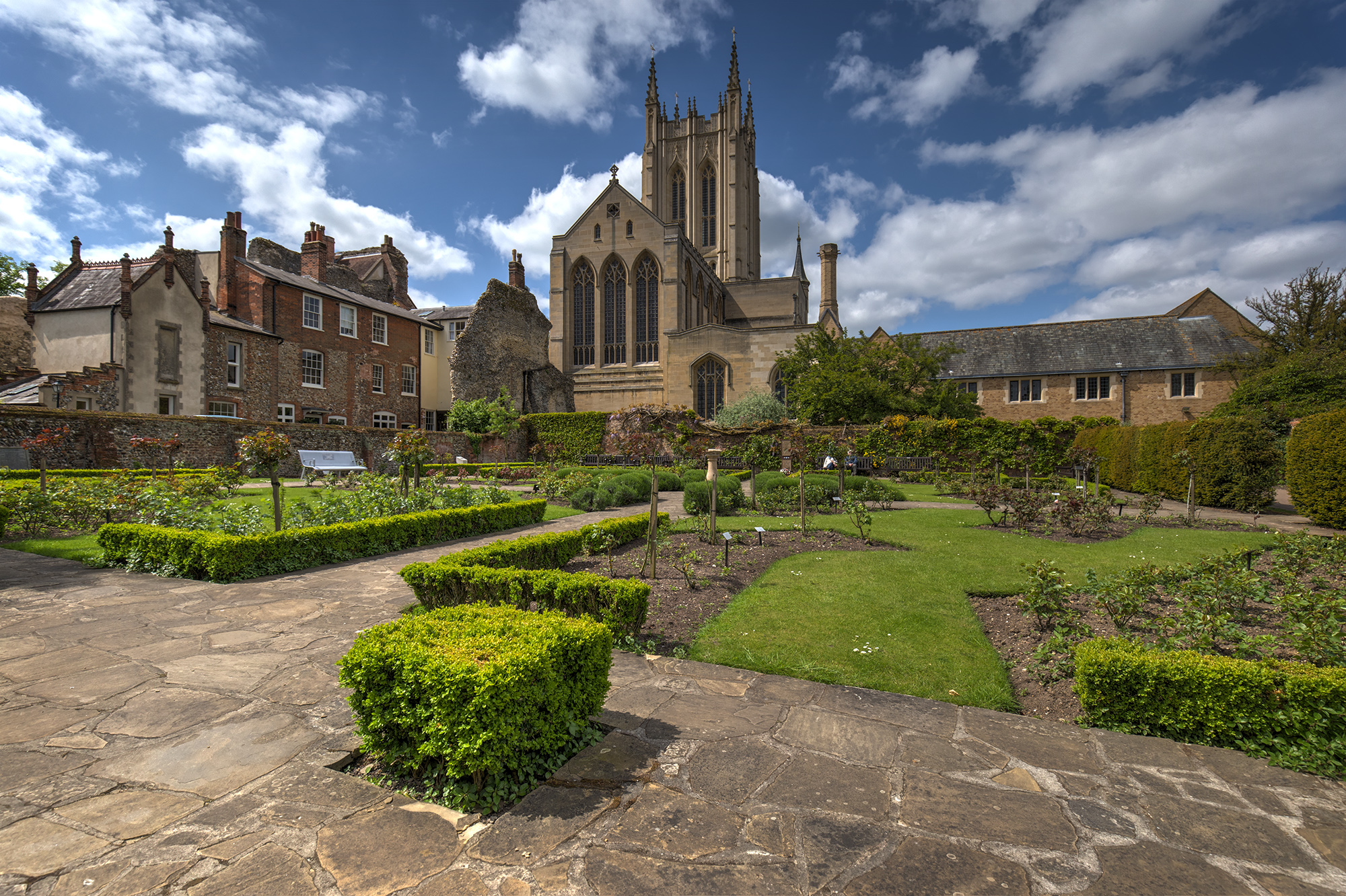
St Edmundsbury Cathedral in Bury St Edmunds, the district's largest town.

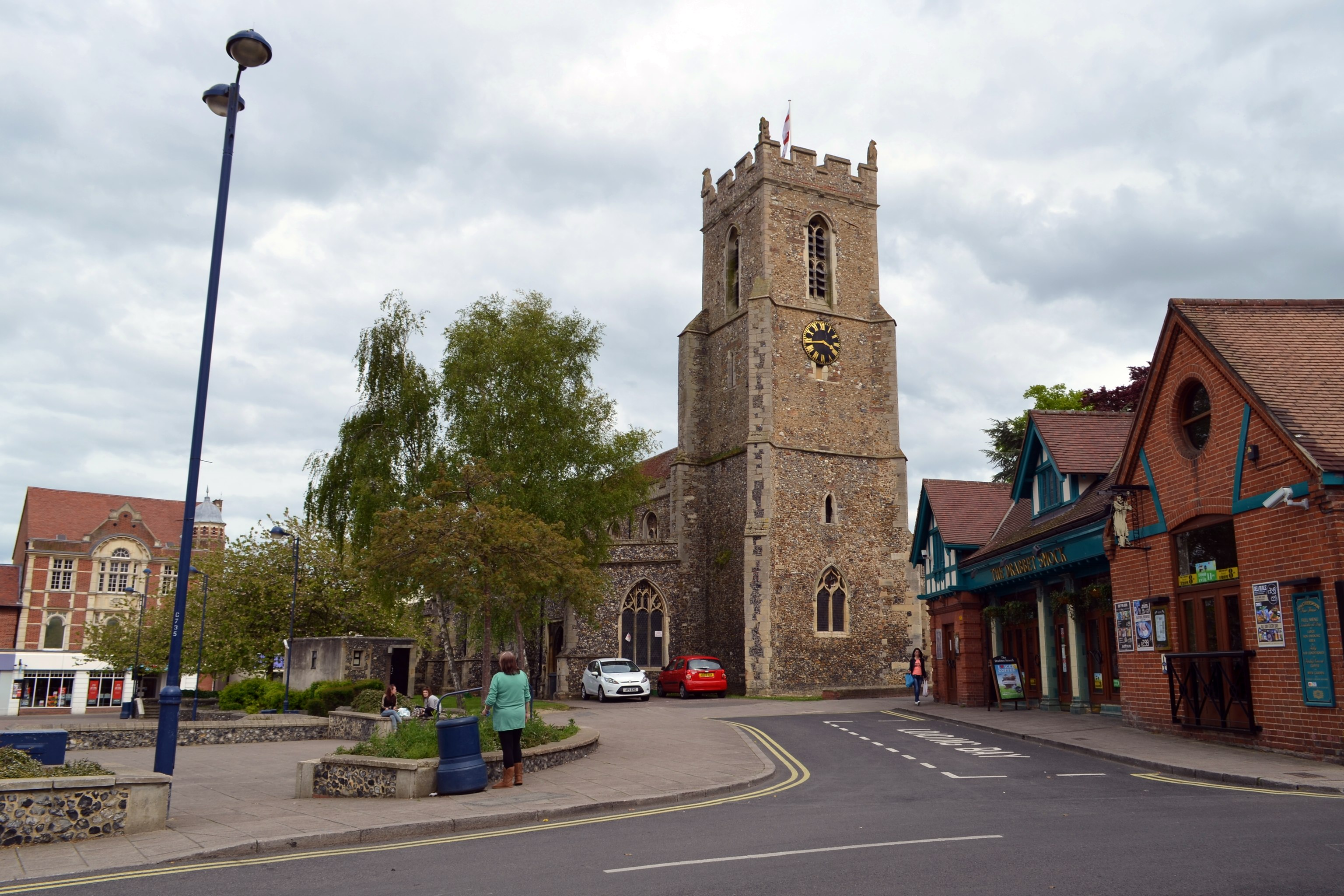
Market Square in Haverhill, the district's second largest town.

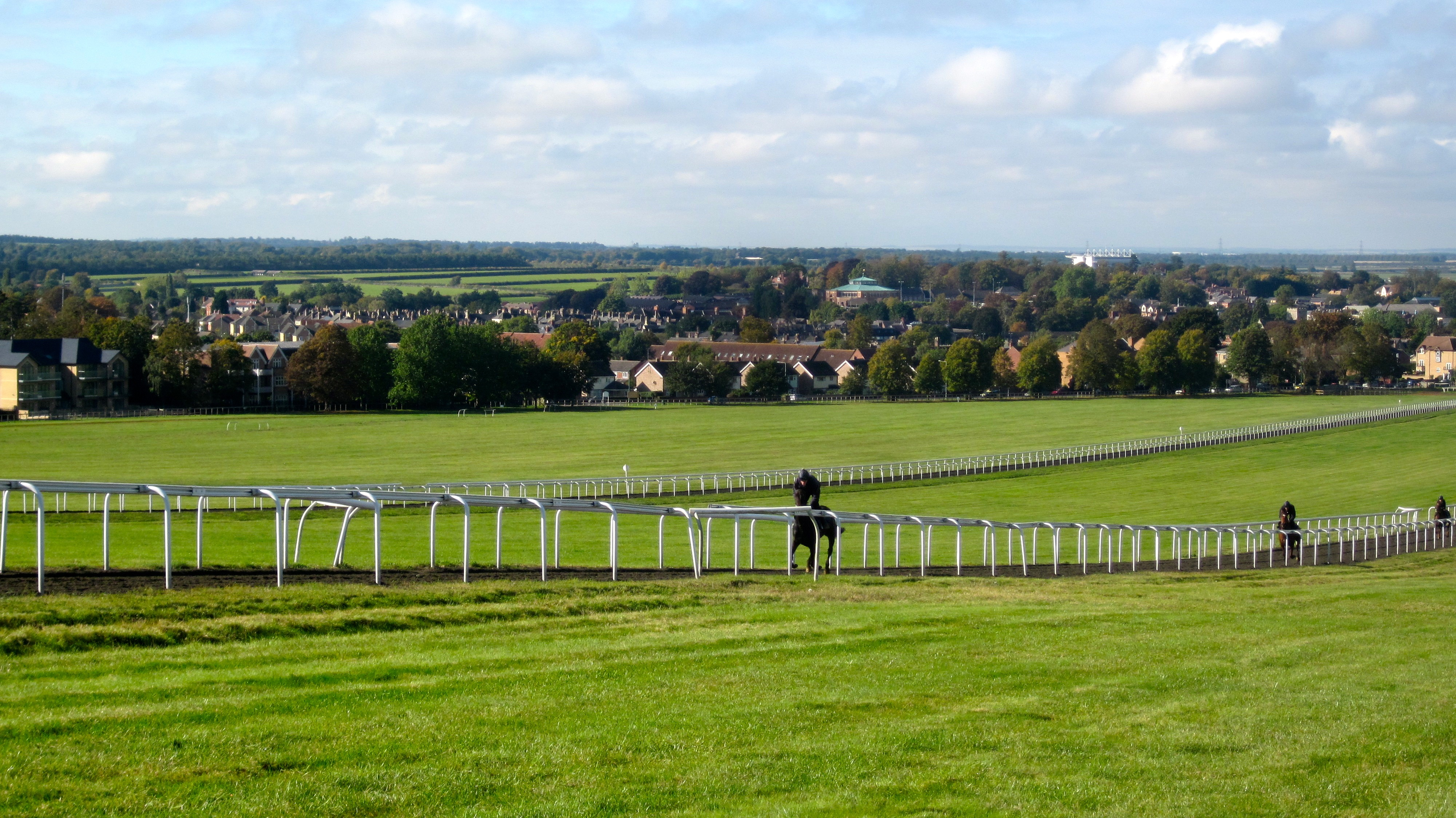
Newmarket is the district's third largest town and is known as a major centre of horse racing.

The whole district is covered by civil parishes. The parish councils of Brandon, Bury St Edmunds, Clare, Haverhill, Mildenhall and Newmarket all take the style "town council".

1. Ampton
2. Bardwell
3. Barnardiston
4. Barnham
5. Barningham
6. Barrow
7. Barton Mills
8. Beck Row, Holywell Row and Kenny Hill
9. Brandon (town)
10. Bradfield Combust with Stanningfield
11. Bradfield St Clare
12. Bradfield St George
13. Brockley
14. Bury St Edmunds (town)
15. Cavendish
16. Cavenham
17. Chedburgh
18. Chevington
19. Clare (town)
20. Coney Weston
21. Cowlinge
22. Culford
23. Dalham
24. Denham
25. Denston
26. Depden
27. Elveden
28. Eriswell
29. Euston
30. Exning
31. Fakenham Magna
32. Flempton
33. Fornham All Saints
34. Fornham St Genevieve
35. Fornham St Martin
36. Freckenham
37. Gazeley
38. Great Barton
39. Great Bradley
40. Great Livermere
41. Great Thurlow
42. Great Whelnetham
43. Great Wratting
44. Hargrave
45. Haverhill (town)
46. Hawkedon
47. Hawstead
48. Hengrave
49. Hepworth
50. Herringswell
51. Higham
52. Honington
53. Hopton
54. Horringer
55. Hundon
56. Icklingham
57. Ickworth
58. Ingham
59. Ixworth
60. Ixworth Thorpe
61. Kedington
62. Kentford
63. Knettishall
64. Lackford
65. Lakenheath
66. Lidgate
67. Little Bradley
68. Little Livermere
69. Little Thurlow
70. Little Whelnetham
71. Little Wratting
72. Market Weston
73. Mildenhall High (town)
74. Moulton
75. Newmarket (town)
76. Nowton
77. Ousden
78. Pakenham
79. Poslingford
80. Rede
81. Red Lodge
82. Risby
83. Rushbrooke with Rougham
84. Santon Downham
85. Sapiston
86. Stansfield
87. Stanton
88. Stoke-by-Clare
89. Stradishall
90. Thelnetham
91. The Saxhams
92. Timworth
93. Troston
94. Tuddenham
95. West Row
96. Westley
97. West Stow
98. Whepstead
99. Wickhambrook
100. Withersfield
101. Wixoe
102. Wordwell
103. Worlington

== See also ==
- 2019 structural changes to local government in England
- East Suffolk District, another district that was created in Suffolk on 1 April 2019.
