= Mary Beale =

English painter (1633–1699)

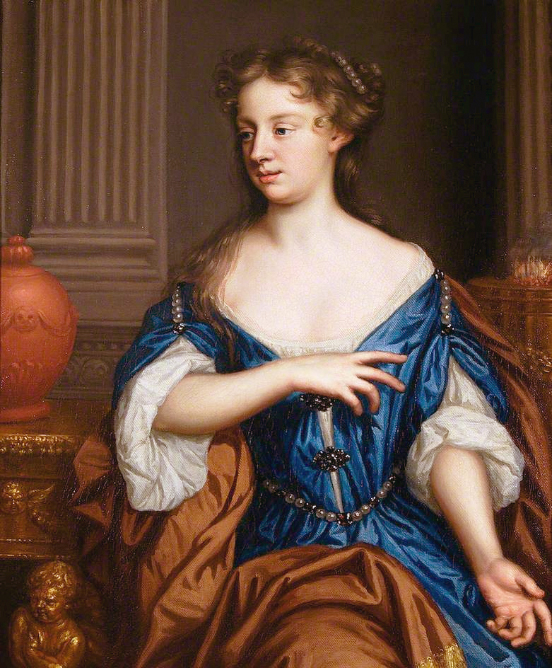
- Self-portrait, c. 1675–‍1680
- Born: Mary Cradock; Late March 1633; Barrow, Suffolk
- Died: Early October 1699 (bur. 10 October 1699.); Pall Mall, London
- Resting place: St James's Church, Piccadilly
- Known for: Portrait painting
- Spouse: Charles Beale

Mary Beale (née Cradock) (1633‍–‍1699) was an English painter who specialised in portrait painting. She was part of a small band of female professional artists working in London. Beale became the main financial provider for her family through her professional work – a career she maintained from 1670/71 to the 1690s. Beale was also a writer, whose prose Discourse on Friendship of 1666 presents a scholarly, uniquely female take on the subject. Her 1663 manuscript Observations, on the materials and techniques employed "in her painting of Apricots", though not printed, is the earliest known instructional text in English written by a female painter.

Praised first as a "virtuous" practitioner in "Oyl Colours" by Sir William Sanderson in his 1658 book Graphice: Or The use of the Pen and Pensil; In the Excellent Art of PAINTING, Beale's work was later commended by court painter Sir Peter Lely and, soon after her death, by the author of "An Essay towards an English-School", his account of the most noteworthy artists of her generation.

== Life ==
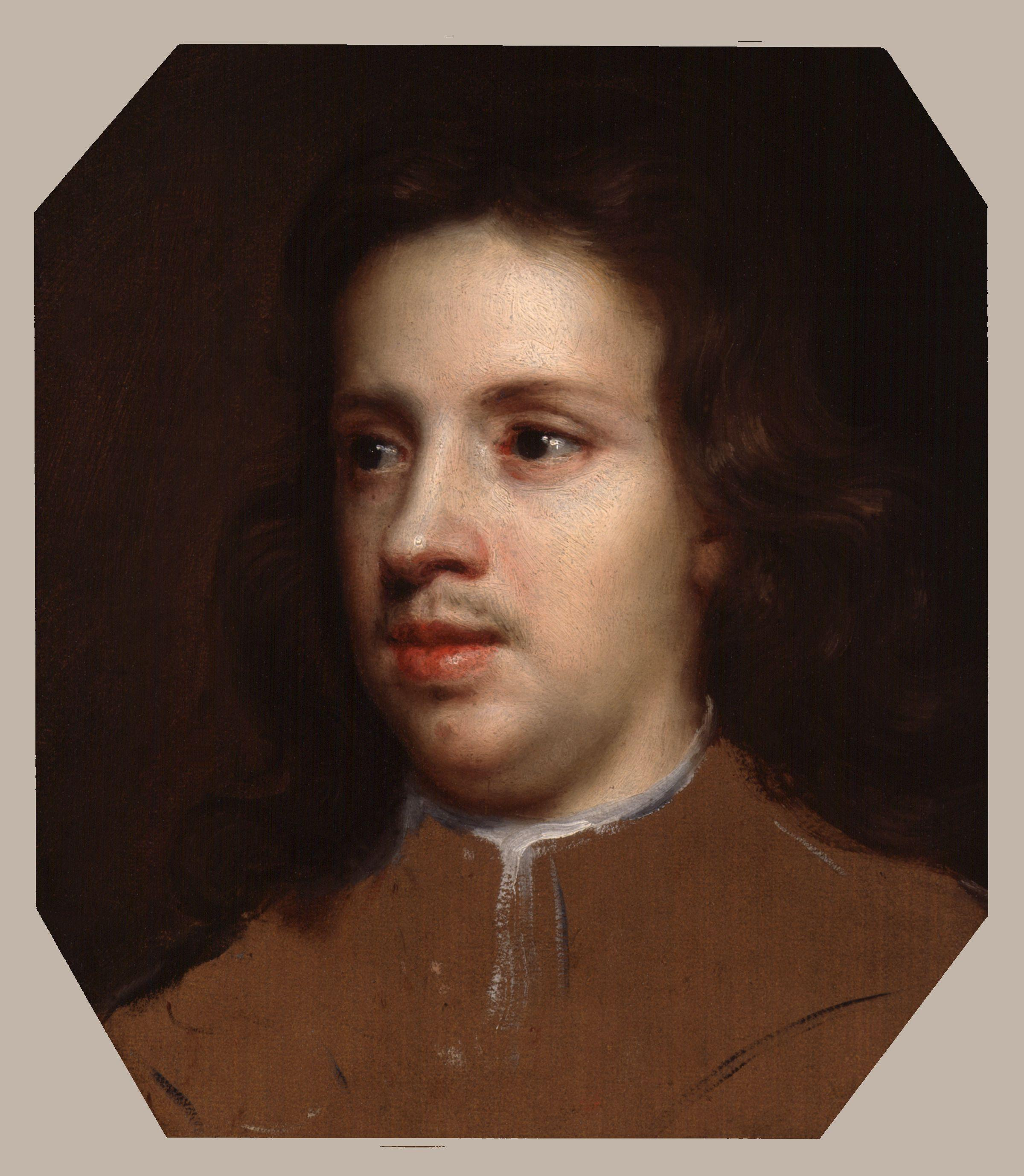
Her husband, the painter Charles Beale the Elder, by Mary Beale

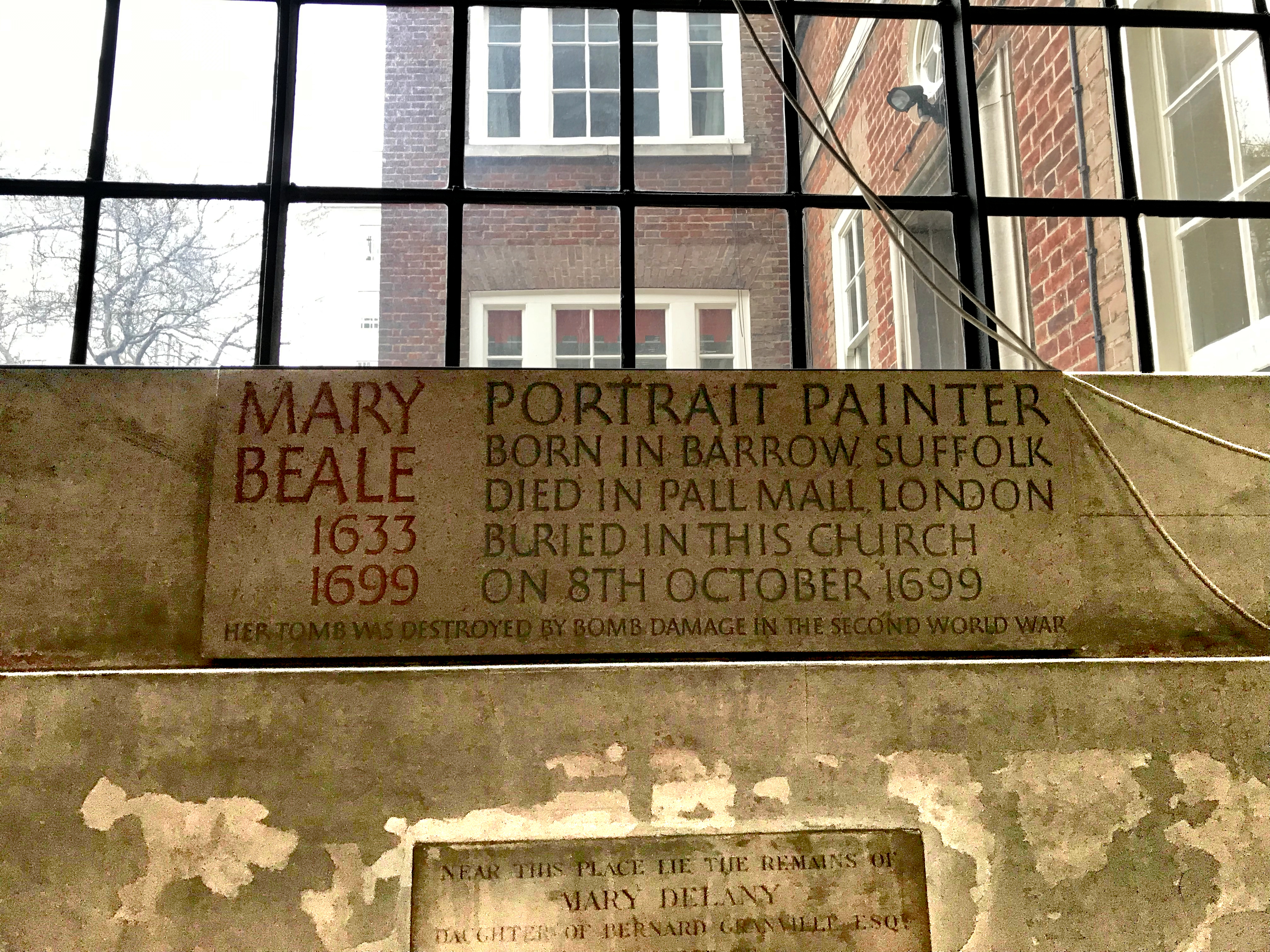
Mary Beale's memorial in St James Church, Piccadilly

Mary Beale was born in the rectory of Barrow, Suffolk, in late March 1633. She was baptised on 26 March by her father John Cradock in All Saints Church in the village. Her mother was Dorothy Brunton/Brinton. Aside from being a rector, John Cradock was also an amateur painter, who may have taught Mary how to paint. Growing up in Barrow, Mary lived close to Bury St Edmunds. A group of painters worked in Bury St Edmunds, including Peter Lely and Matthew Snelling, whom Mary may have met in her youth. On 23 August 1643, Dorothy Cradock gave birth to a son named John. Dorothy died not long after the birth, leaving Mary motherless at age ten. During the Civil War, John Cradock appointed Walter Cradock, a distant cousin of his, as guardian of his children John and Mary.

Mary Cradock met Charles Beale (1632‍–‍1705) from Walton Hall in north Buckinghamshire. Mary and Charles married on 8 March 1652 when she was almost nineteen. Her father, John Cradock, was gravely ill at the time and died a few days after Mary's marriage. The couple moved to Covent Garden (London) then Fleet Street at some point afterward. Charles Beale was a Civil Service clerk at the time, who in 1660 succeeded his father as deputy clerk of the patents office. As Mary's success grew sufficient to sustain the family, he became her studio manager. At some point, Charles was working for the Board of Green Cloth where he mixed colour pigments. Circa 1664, the family moved to Albrook, (now Allbrook), Eastleigh, Hampshire, to escape the plague. Throughout their marriage, Mary and Charles worked together as equals and as business partners, which was not often seen at the time. On 18 October 1654 Charles and Mary's first son, Bartholomew, was buried. Little else is known about their first son. Their second son was baptised on 14 February 1655/6 and also named Bartholomew. Their third son Charles was born in 1660.

Mary Beale died in early October 1699 at the age of sixty-six. (Note: Clayton gives 1697, as reported in Horace Walpole's Anecdotes of painting in England. That is incorrect. The parish register shows that the 1697 date is for a Mary Beadle and later it shows Beale being buried on 8 October 1699.) Not much is known about her death besides that she died in a house on Pall Mall and was buried under the communion table of St James's Church, Piccadilly. Her tomb was destroyed by enemy bombs during the Second World War. A memorial to her lies within the church.

In 2026, Historic England erected a blue plaque in her honour at her former home in Eastleigh.

== Career and education ==
The most common way to learn how to paint at the time was to copy great works and masterpieces that were accessible. Mary Beale preferred to paint in oil and water colours. Whenever she did a drawing, she would draw in crayon. Peter Lely, who succeeded Anthony van Dyck as the court painter, took a great interest in Mary's progress as an artist, especially since she would practice painting by imitating some of his work. Mary Beale started working by painting favours for people she knew in exchange for small gifts or favors. Charles Beale kept close record of everything Mary did as an artist. He would take notes on how she painted, what business transactions took place, who came to visit, and what praise she would receive. Charles wrote thirty notebooks' worth of observations over the years, calling Mary "my dearest heart". She became a semi-professional portrait painter in the 1650s and 1660s, working from her home, first in Covent Garden and later in Fleet Street in London. When living in Covent Garden, Beale was a near neighbour to artist Joan Carlile.

=== Training ===
Mary received no formal training from an academy, had no connection to an artist guild, and no royal or courtly patronage. She received a humanist education from her father. During her childhood in Suffolk Mary's father was friendly with contemporary British artists such as Sir Nathaniel Bacon, Robert Walker, and Sir Peter Lely, leading to both Robert Walker and Peter Lely being "the most likely drawing masters to the young Mary". The exact time of Mary's introduction to Lely is debated and one theory has the two meeting prior to her marriage to Charles, when she was living in Suffolk. The other theory has the pair meeting in either 1655 or 1656 when Mary and Charles moved to Convent Garden in London and became Lely's neighbour.

In detailed documents kept by Charles Beale of his wife's practice it states that Lely would visit the Beale home occasionally to observe Mary paint and praise her work. Their friendship led to Lely loaning Beale and her family some of his old master paintings for them to copy from. The Beales commissioned portraits from Lely, of themselves and their friends. Her near-contemporary George Vertue (1684–1756) records that Lely's portraits of Mary and her family were present at their home at Hind Court in 1661.

=== Writings ===
In 1663 Mary Beale wrote Observations, an instruction on painting apricots using oils. The work marks one of the earliest writings on oil painting instruction to come out of England by an artist of either gender. It was never released on its own in print, however scholars believe that manuscripts of the work were distributed. The work was found in a notebook collecting writings by Charles Beale but was written entirely by Mary, which Helen Draper states is "a unique example of husband-and-wife collaboration in the history of technical literature on painting."

Mary Beale also wrote a manuscript called Discourse on Friendship in 1666 and four poems in 1667.

=== The business of painting ===
Mary's father, an amateur artist, funded her general education may have including courses in painting and drawing. It could be easy to misconstrue strangers entering a woman's home for a business transaction as something that would portray the woman in an impure light. Once Mary did start painting for money in the 1670s, she carefully picked whom she would paint, and used the praise of her circle of friends to build a good reputation as a painter. Some of these people included Queen Henrietta Maria and John Tillotson, a clergyman from St James' Church, a close friend of Mary Beale who eventually became the Archbishop of Canterbury. It may be due to Mary's father, John, who was a rector, or her close connection to Tillotson that kept the clergymen of St James' as consistent customers. Mary's connection to Tillotson as well as her strong Puritan marriage to Charles worked in her favour in building up her good reputation. Mary Beale typically charged five pounds for a painting of a head and ten pounds for half of a body for oil paintings. She made about two hundred pounds a year and gave ten per cent of her earnings to charity. This income was enough to support her family, and she did so. Wasle and Jeffree consider it truly remarkable that Mary Beale was responsible for being the breadwinner of the family. By 1681 Mary's commissions were beginning to diminish.

In 1681, Mary Beale took on two students, Keaty Trioche and Mr. More, who worked with her in the studio. In 1691, Sarah Curtis from Yorkshire became another student of Mary's. Sarah had similar behaviours and dispositions as Mary.

==== Prominent sitters ====
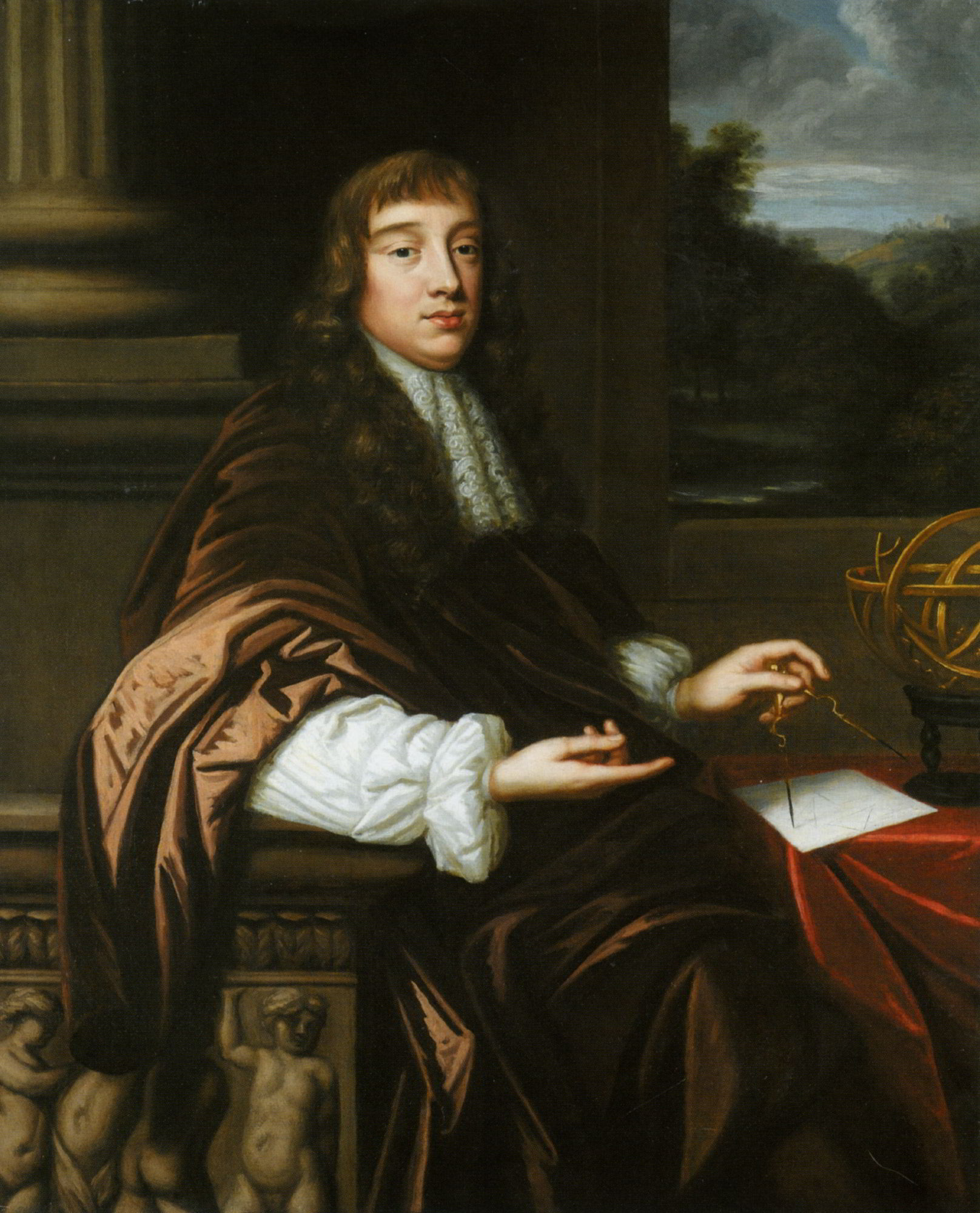
Portrait of a Mathematician (c. 1680) The identity of the subject is not known but has been conjectured to be Robert Hooke or Isaac Barrow (Note: In 1964, Christie's attributed it to Godfrey Kneller as a portrait of Isaac Newton)

Distinguished Anglican Clergyman Dr. John Tillotson (1630–1694) was a frequent sitter for Mrs. Beale. She painted him a total of five times in 1664,1672,1677, 1681, and 1687. Dr. Tillotson was related to the Cromwell family because he married the niece of Oliver Cromwell, Elizabeth in 1664. Elizabeth was a close friend of Mary's and was one of the individuals who received her writing "The Discourse on Friendship". the Beale's would commission a portrait of Dr. Tillotson for themselves by Sir Peter Lely in 1672.

Royalist Colonel Giles Strangways (1615–1675) was an admirer of Mary Beale's paintings and another important patron. Strangways fought for King Charles I during the English civil war and also had a hand in the secret escape of Charles II into exile in 1651, as well as his reinstatement in 1660. Mary was commissioned by Strangways to paint his portrait along with ones of his wife, his son and his daughter during the 1670s.

Nobleman Henry Cavendish (1630–1691) was another important sitter for Mary Beale. He became the 2nd Duke of Newcastle in 1676 and he and his Duchess Frances née Pierrepont were frequent patrons of Mary, from whom they commissioned their portraits in 1677. The Duke and Duchess were introduced to Mary's work through Frances' father, the Hon. William Pierrepont (1607–1678) whose portrait was also painted by Mary around 1670. William Pierrepont was supportive of Oliver Cromwell during the English Civil War and remained an opponent to the Restoration of the Stuart Monarchy.

== The Beale children ==
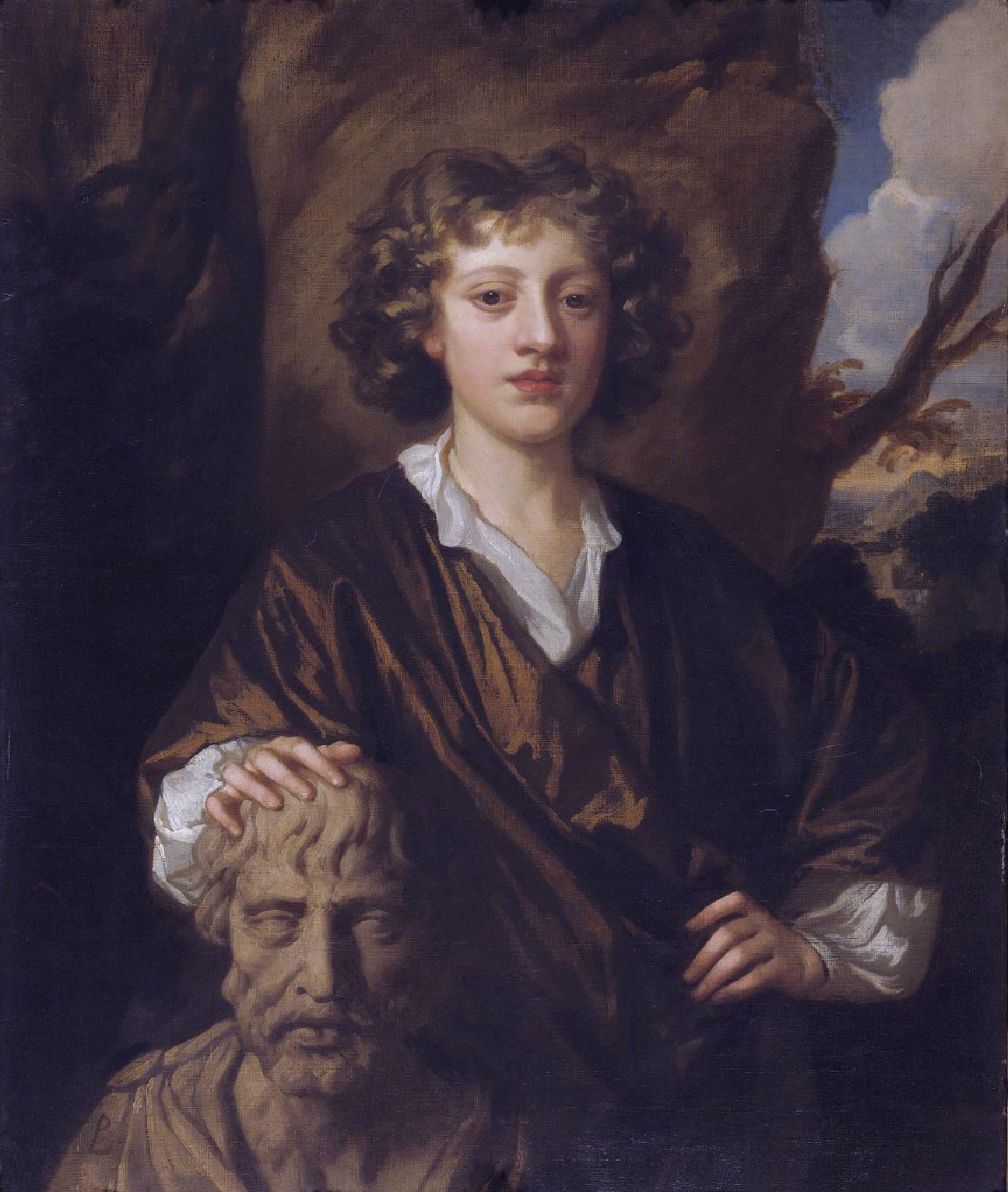
Her son Bartholomew Beale (1656–1709), by Sir Peter Lely, c. 1670

Charles and Bartholomew Beale helped with work in the studio in their youth, where they painted draperies and sculpted ovals; these ovals were a critical piece in Mary Beale's head portraits. Young Charles Beale, named after his father, showed great talent in painting and went to study miniature painting on 5 March 1677. He enjoyed painting miniature sculptures from 1679 to 1688, when his eyesight started to fail him. From then on, he worked on full scale portraits. Bartholomew Beale, the second son, started with painting but instead turned to medicine. In 1680, he studied at Clare Hall, Cambridge and graduated MB in 1682. Bartholomew set up his medical practice on a small property in Coventry, which his father owned.

== Style ==
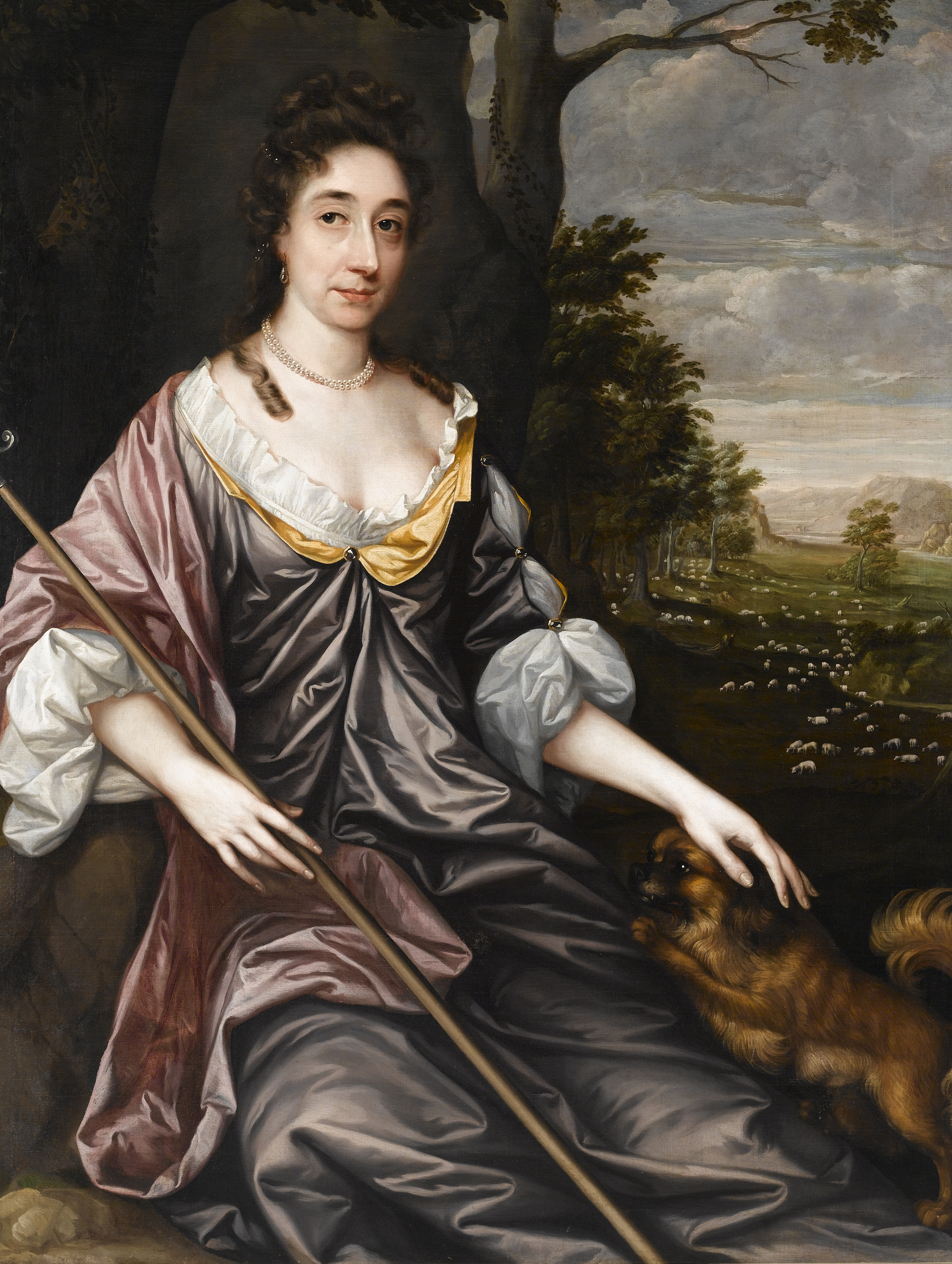
Portrait of a Lady called Mrs Walkey of Alphington (1675–1680)

The style that Mary Beale painted in was Baroque. Baroque art is a style of sculpture, painting, music, and architecture that was prominent in Europe from the early 17th century until the mid 18th. Baroque art is characterized by use of light and shadow, depictions of movement, as well as use of rich colour, all to elicit a sense of grandeur and awe. Baroque portraiture in particular is known for its rich colours, light contrasts, and attention to fabric detail.

Mary Beale's paintings are often described as "vigorous" and "masculine". (It was common to praise a woman for her work by calling her "masculine".) The colour is seen as pure, sweet, natural, clear and fresh, although some critics see her colouring as "heavy and stiff". Due to copying Italian masterpieces as practice, Mary Beale is said to have acquired "an Italian air and style". Not too many could compete with her "colour, strength, force, or life". Peter Lely admired Beale's work, saying she "worked with a wonderful body of colour, and was exceedingly industrious." Others criticised her work as "heavy and stiff". Forty years after her death, when researching for a history of British art, Vertue praised her work, saying "Mrs. Mary Beale painted in oil very well" and "work'd with a wonderfull body of Colours".

== Modern display ==
Some of her work can be found on display in the Museum of the Home in London, though the largest public collection can be found at Moyse's Hall museum, in Bury St Edmunds, Suffolk. Beale was the subject of a solo exhibition in 1975, at the (then) 'Geffrye Museum' (since renamed as the 'Museum of the Home'), which transferred to the Towner Art Gallery in Eastbourne the following year. More recently (summer 2024), her work was shown in the 'Fruits of Friendship' exhibition at the Philip Mould & Co gallery in Pall Mall, the street where she lived and died.

The National Portrait Gallery and Tate Britain have small collections of her work, not all of which is in display.

== Sources ==
- Clayton, Ellen C. (1876). English Female Artists. Vol. 1. London: Tinsley Brothers. pp. 40–53.
- Dabbs, Julia Kathleen (2009). Life stories of women artists, 1550–1800 : an anthology. Farnham, England: Ashgate. ISBN 978-0-7546-5431-5. OCLC 317824669.
- Draper, Helen (2012). "Her Painting of Apricots': the invisibility of Mary Beale (1633–1699)". Forum for Modern Language Studies. 48 (4). Oxford University Press Academic Journals: 389–405. doi:10.1093/fmls/cqs023. [online, free to view]..
- Draper, Helen (2015). "Mary Beale and Art's lost laborers: women Painter Stainers'". Early Modern Women. 10 (1): 141–151. doi:10.1353/emw.2015.0006. JSTOR 26431363.
- Griffing, Lawrence R. (2020). "The lost portrait of Robert Hooke?". Journal of Microscopy. 278 (3): 114–122. doi:10.1111/jmi.12828. PMID 31497878. S2CID 202003003.
- Griffing, Lawrence R. (2021). "Comments on Dr Whittaker's letter and the article". Journal of Microscopy. 282 (2): 191–192. doi:10.1111/jmi.12993. PMID 33438230.
- Hunting, Penelope (2019). My dearest heart : the artist Mary Beale (1633-1699). Bendor Grosvenor. London: Unicorn. ISBN 978-1-912690-08-4. OCLC 1057291032.
- Morrill, Rebecca; Wright, Karen; Elderton, Louisa, eds. (2019). Great Women Artists. Phaidon Press. ISBN 978-0714878775. OCLC 1099690505.
- Millar, Oliver (2000). "Mary Beale". Burlington Magazine. Vol. 142, no. 1162. London. pp. 48–49. JSTOR 888781.
- Reeve, Christopher (2008). "Beale [nee Cradock], Mary (bap. 1633, d. 1699), portrait painter physician". Oxford Dictionary of National Biography. Oxford Dictionary of National Biography (online ed.). Oxford University Press. doi:10.1093/ref:odnb/1803. (Subscription, Wikipedia Library access or UK public library membership required.)
- Toynbee, Margaret; Isham, Gyles (1954). "Joan Carlile (1606?–1679) – An Identification". The Burlington Magazine. Vol. 96, no. 618. pp. 275–274. ISSN 0007-6287. JSTOR 871403.
- Walsh, Elizabeth (1948). "Mary Beale". Burlington Magazine. Vol. 90, no. 544. p. 209. JSTOR 869707.
- Walshe, Elizabeth; Jeffree, Richard (1975), "The Excellent Mrs Mary Beale", exhibition catalogue, 13 October-21 December 1975, Geffrye Museum, London; 10 January-21 February 1976, Towner Art Gallery, Eastbourne. Introduction by Sir Oliver Millar and special contributions by Margaret Toynbee and Richard Sword], London: Inner London Education Authority
- Whittaker, Christopher A. (2021). "Unconvincing evidence that Beale's Mathematician is Robert Hooke". Journal of Microscopy. 282 (2): 189–190. doi:10.1111/jmi.12987. ISSN 0022-2720. PMID 33231292. S2CID 227159587.
- Ziegler, Georgianna (2021). "My Dearest Heart: The Artist Mary Beale (1633–1699) Penelope Hunting. London Unicorn 2019; ISBN 978-1-912690-08-4". Early Modern Women. 16 (1). Chicago: University of Chicago Press: 176–179. doi:10.1086/715619. ISSN 1933-0065. S2CID 244187564. (Book review)
