= John Griffiths (Conservative politician) =

British Conservative politician (born 1953)

Councillor John Griffiths MBE
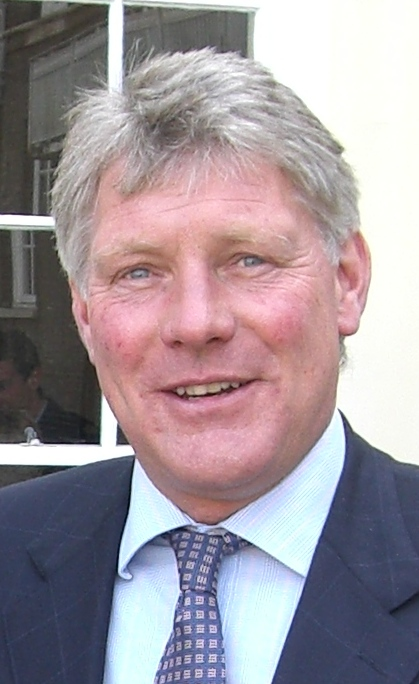
- Griffiths in 2007
- Born: 3 December 1953 (age 72)
- Occupations: Former merchant banker, now businessman
- Known for: Leader, St Edmundsbury Borough Council from May 2003 - May 2023
- Father: Eldon Griffiths

John Henry Morgan Griffiths MBE (born 3 December 1953) is a Conservative local government politician and former merchant banker. As leader of St Edmundsbury Borough Council from 2003 he was instrumental in establishing significant growth and development in its two towns of Haverhill and Bury St Edmunds. He is the son of former government minister Sir Eldon Griffiths and was awarded the MBE in 2011 for services to local government.

== Banker ==
Griffiths first worked at Lloyds Bank International from 1975 to 1979, then at Samuel Montagu & Co Ltd from 1979 to 1990 (as syndications manager 1981-83, director and West Coast rep Samuel Montagu Inc 1983-87, exec dir 1986-90), and lastly as deputy general manager at Nomura Bank International plc 1990-91. He was chief executive of Lynton Bardwell Ltd and Managing Director of CL BES Ltd from 1993 and a director of the Suffolk Development Agency, Greater Cambridge Partnership and chairman of the Western Suffolk LSP from 2004.

== Council member ==
Griffiths was first elected onto St Edmundsbury council (SEBC) as the member for Ixworth ward at a by-election in 1997. In the subsequent four elections he was returned unopposed in all but that held in 2007. In May 2002 he became the leader of the Conservative group when the previous leader was asked to step down after less than two years in the post. In May 2003 the Conservatives regained control of the council and John Griffiths was therefore elected as council leader.

== Council leader ==
In his first eight years as council leader the following improvements were seen in the borough's two towns of Haverhill and Bury St Edmunds. These were either been facilitated or initiated by the council.

Haverhill

Queen Street improvement; new multi-screen cinema; Tesco supermarket and refurbished leisure centre.

Bury St Edmunds

New arc shopping centre with Debenhams anchor store, underground car park and 600 seat apex performance centre, all designed by Sir Michael Hopkins (architect); new multi-screen cinema; refurbished leisure centre; rescue and conversion of historic West Front of ancient Abbey into new properties.

Among general successes during Griffths' leadership of the borough council are its record of waste recycling, both national and regional. Council tax has also been frozen or kept below inflation during most of Griffiths' term as leader. In 2011 he led the negotiations with Forest Heath district council which led to the two authorities sharing one chief executive and management team, which led to St Edmundsbury freezing council tax in subsequent years.

== Opposition ==
Griffiths' achievements have not been popular with everyone. In particular there was significant opposition to the arc and apex, known locally as "the cattle market development" because of the former use of the land more recently used for car parking. A somewhat shadowy organisation self styled "The Knights of St Edmund" had previously put a curse on the development (sic), describing the council as "Judas Iscariot". Despite this the development was completed and was the subject of praise.
