= Denham, West Suffolk =

Village in Suffolk, England

Coordinates: 52.222°N 0.571°E

Denham
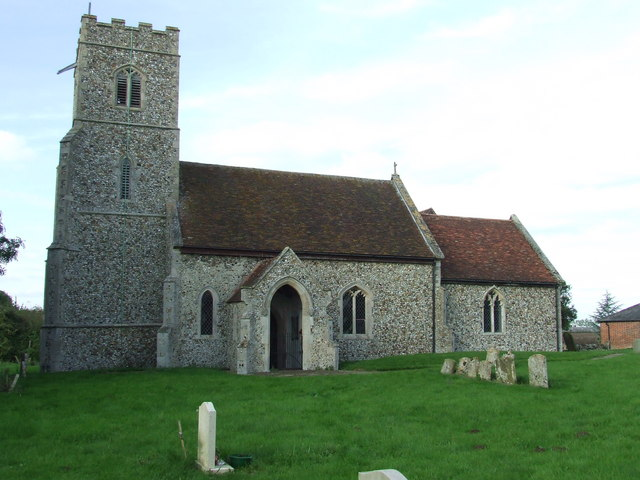
- St Mary's church, Denham

- Location within Suffolk
- Population: 170; 171 (2011)
- District: West Suffolk
- Shire county: Suffolk
- Region: East
- Country: England
- Sovereign state: United Kingdom
- Post town: Bury St Edmunds
- Postcode district: IP29
- Police: Suffolk
- Fire: Suffolk
- Ambulance: East of England

Denham is a village and civil parish in the West Suffolk district of Suffolk in eastern England. Located around five miles west of Bury St Edmunds, in 2005 its population was 170, increasing to 171 at the 2011 Census. The parish also includes the hamlet of Denham End, as well as the remains of Denham Castle, a motte-and-bailey structure. The parish council is shared with neighbouring Barrow.

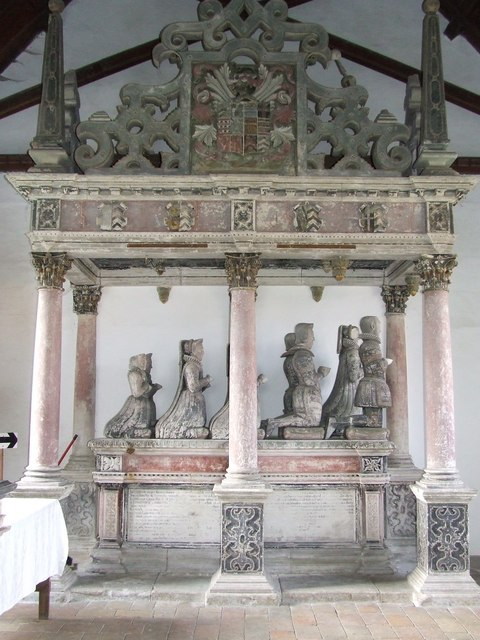
Monument to Edward Lewkenor and his wife

The mediaeval church of St Mary's was restored in 1846 and is a grade II* listed building. In the chapel is a large canopied table monument to MP Sir Edward Lewkenor and his wife of Denham Hall who both died in 1605 of smallpox.
