= Troston =

Village in Suffolk, England

Coordinates: 52.314°N 0.783°E

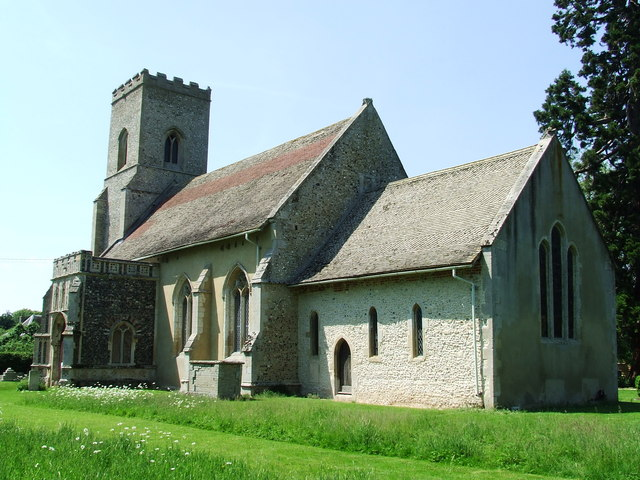
- St Mary's church, Troston

- Location within Suffolk
- Area: 7.32 km^{2} (2.83 sq mi)
- Population: 952 (2011 Census)
  - Density: 130/km^{2} (340/sq mi)
- OS grid reference: TL898721
- District: West Suffolk
- Shire county: Suffolk
- Region: East
- Country: England
- Sovereign state: United Kingdom
- Post town: Bury St Edmunds
- Postcode district: IP31
- Dialling code: 01359
- Police: Suffolk
- Fire: Suffolk
- Ambulance: East of England
- UK Parliament: Bury St Edmunds and Stowmarket

Troston is a village and civil parish in Suffolk, England, five miles north-east of Bury St Edmunds. Its parish church contains rare mediaeval wall paintings, including dragon-slaying and the Martyrdom of St Edmund.

The local pub, The Bull, had been a central part of the village since the late 1800s, but was closed, leaving it boarded up. Owners, brewers Greene King, sold it, and The Bull has now reopened as a Free House with a restaurant.

Troston Hall, to the south of the village, is a Grade II* listed late 16th century manor house, with the Grade II listed Hall Farm to its north.

There are sixteen listed buildings in the village.

== Governance and religion ==
The parish falls under the West Suffolk District Council ward of Pakenham & Troston, the Suffolk County Council division of Thingoe North, and the parliamentary constituency of Bury St Edmunds and Stowmarket, whose MP since 2024 is Peter Prinsley of the Labour Party.

The ecclesiastical parish falls under the province of Canterbury, the diocese of St Edmundsbury and Ipswich, the archdeaconry of Sudbury, and the deanery of Ixworth.

== Notable residents ==
- Edward Capell (1713-1781), Shakespearian critic and Groom of the Privy Chamber
- Capel Lofft (1754-1824), lawyer, political figure, and writer.
