= Ixworth Thorpe =

Village in Suffolk, England

Coordinates: 52.321°N 0.811°E

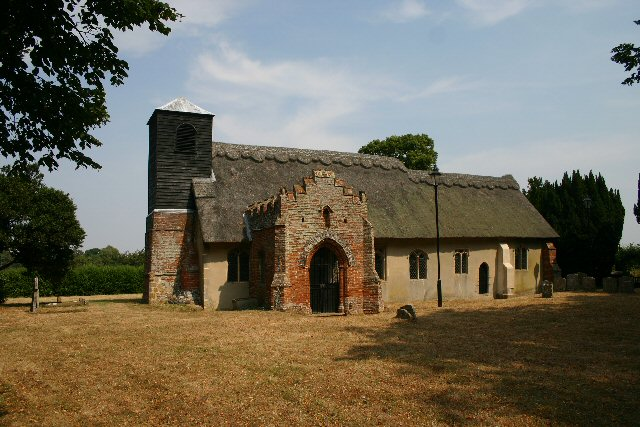
- Church of All Saints, Ixworth Thorpe

- Location within Suffolk
- Population: 60
- OS grid reference: TL914729
- District: West Suffolk
- Shire county: Suffolk
- Region: East
- Country: England
- Sovereign state: United Kingdom
- Post town: Bury St Edmunds
- Postcode district: IP31
- Police: Suffolk
- Fire: Suffolk
- Ambulance: East of England
- UK Parliament: West Suffolk

Ixworth Thorpe is a small village and civil parish in the West Suffolk district of the English county of Suffolk. The village is located on the A1088 road around 2 miles (3.2 km) north-west of the larger village of Ixworth and 7 miles (11.3 km) north-east of Bury St Edmunds. In 2005 its estimated population was 60. The parish council is operated jointly with Ixworth. From the 2011 Census the population of the village was not recorded separately.

== History ==
The village was mentioned in the Domesday Book at which time it was known as Torp or Torpa. It was a large village with around 31 households at this time as well as two mills. The manor formed part of the holdings of the Huard of Vernon, having been held by the Abbey of Bury St Edmunds in 1066.

== Church of All Saints ==
The Church of All Saints was the parish church and is now a chapel of ease. The building has 11th century doorways, a thatched roof and lies to the south of the village alongside the A1088. It is a Grade I listed building and contains "nationally important" carved wooden bench ends dating from the 15th century and a brick built Tudor porch as well as two early medieval coffin lids set into the floor near the south door.
