= Rede, Suffolk =

Village in Suffolk, England

Coordinates: 52.171°N 0.639°E

Rede
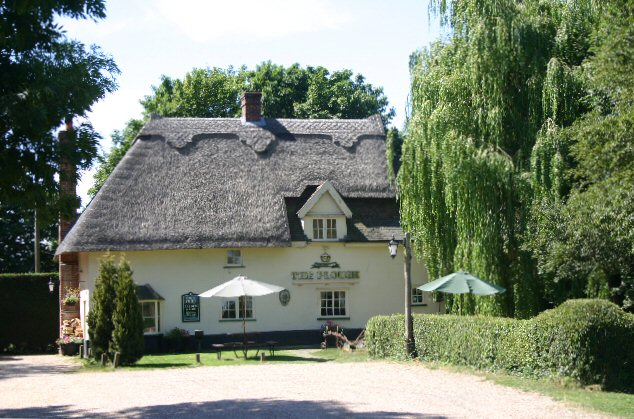
- The Plough Inn, Rede

- Location within Suffolk
- Population: 160; 131 (2011)
- District: West Suffolk
- Shire county: Suffolk
- Region: East
- Country: England
- Sovereign state: United Kingdom
- Post town: Bury St Edmunds
- Postcode district: IP29
- Police: Suffolk
- Fire: Suffolk
- Ambulance: East of England
- UK Parliament: West Suffolk

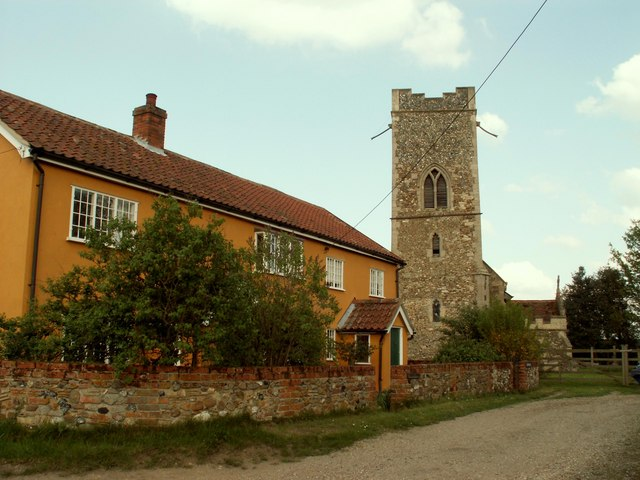
Church and Cottages at Rede

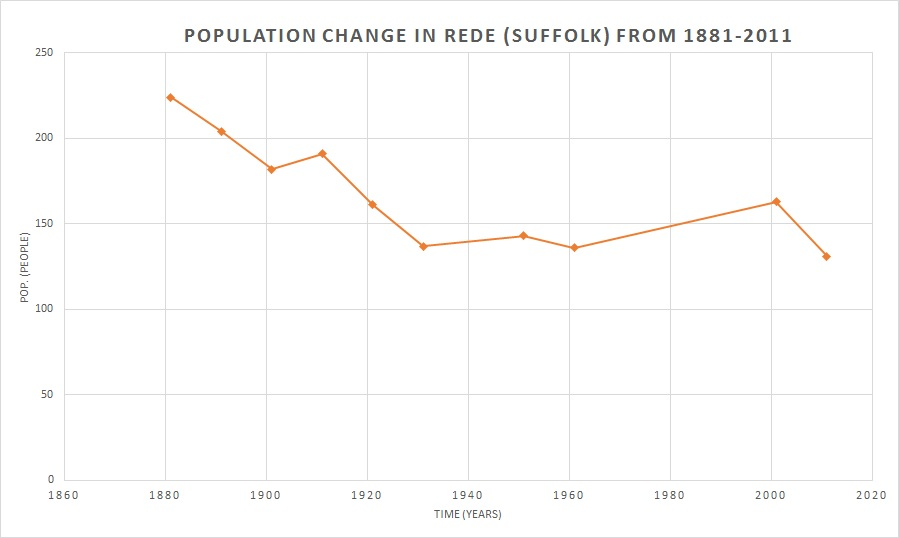
The total population change of Rede, Suffolk, as reported by the Census of population from 1881 to 2011

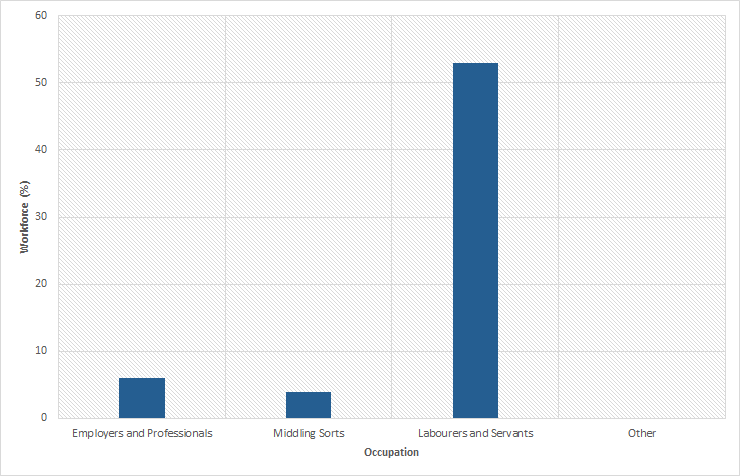
A graph to show the occupation of the residents living in Rede in 1831 using information from the National Census

Rede is a village and civil parish in the West Suffolk district of Suffolk in eastern England. Its location is situated South East of Chedburgh. In 1887 Rede was described as being "7 miles S[outh] W[est] of Bury St Edmunds, 1224 ac[res], pop[ulation] 224".

Its population in 2011 was 131 residents according to the Census taken in that year.

The institutional history of Rede explains that it has always been a place of housing for agricultural workers, craftsmen and the lower class in general. It is thought that the name "Rede" originates from a mercer from London, William Rede who was granted the manor and advowson of nearby medieval site of Beccles.

Great Wood Hill, the highest point in Suffolk, is around 1.7 km (1.1 mi) west of Rede.
