= Great Wratting =

Village in Suffolk, England

Coordinates: 52.106°N 0.460°E

- Location within Suffolk
- Population: 210; 196 (2011 Census)
- District: West Suffolk
- Shire county: Suffolk
- Region: East
- Country: England
- Sovereign state: United Kingdom
- Post town: Haverhill
- Postcode district: CB9
- Police: Suffolk
- Fire: Suffolk
- Ambulance: East of England

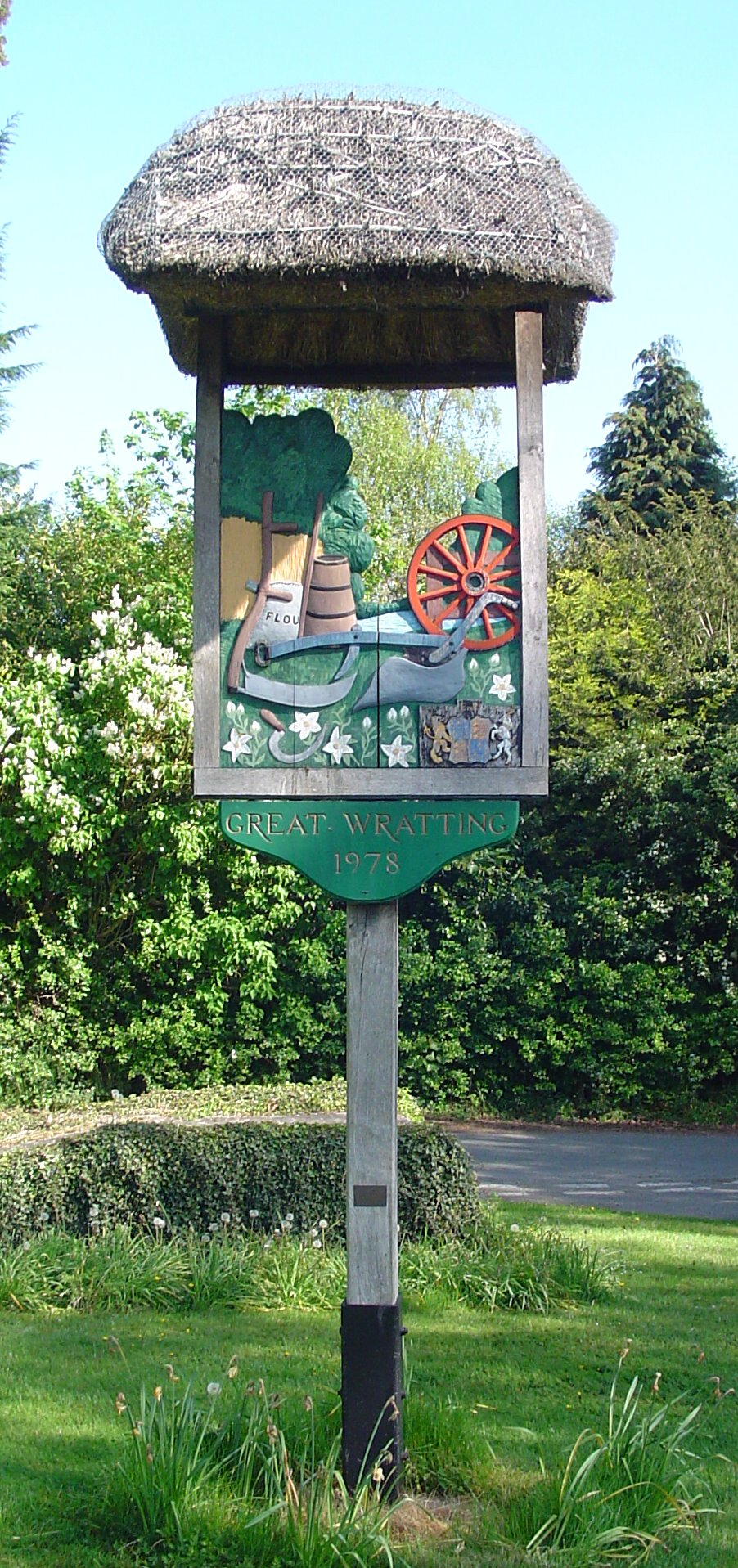
Village sign in Great Wratting

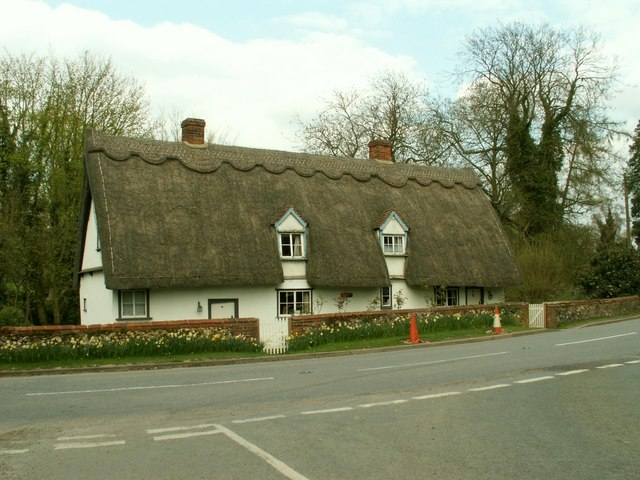
Thatched cottage beside the B1061 road in Great Wratting

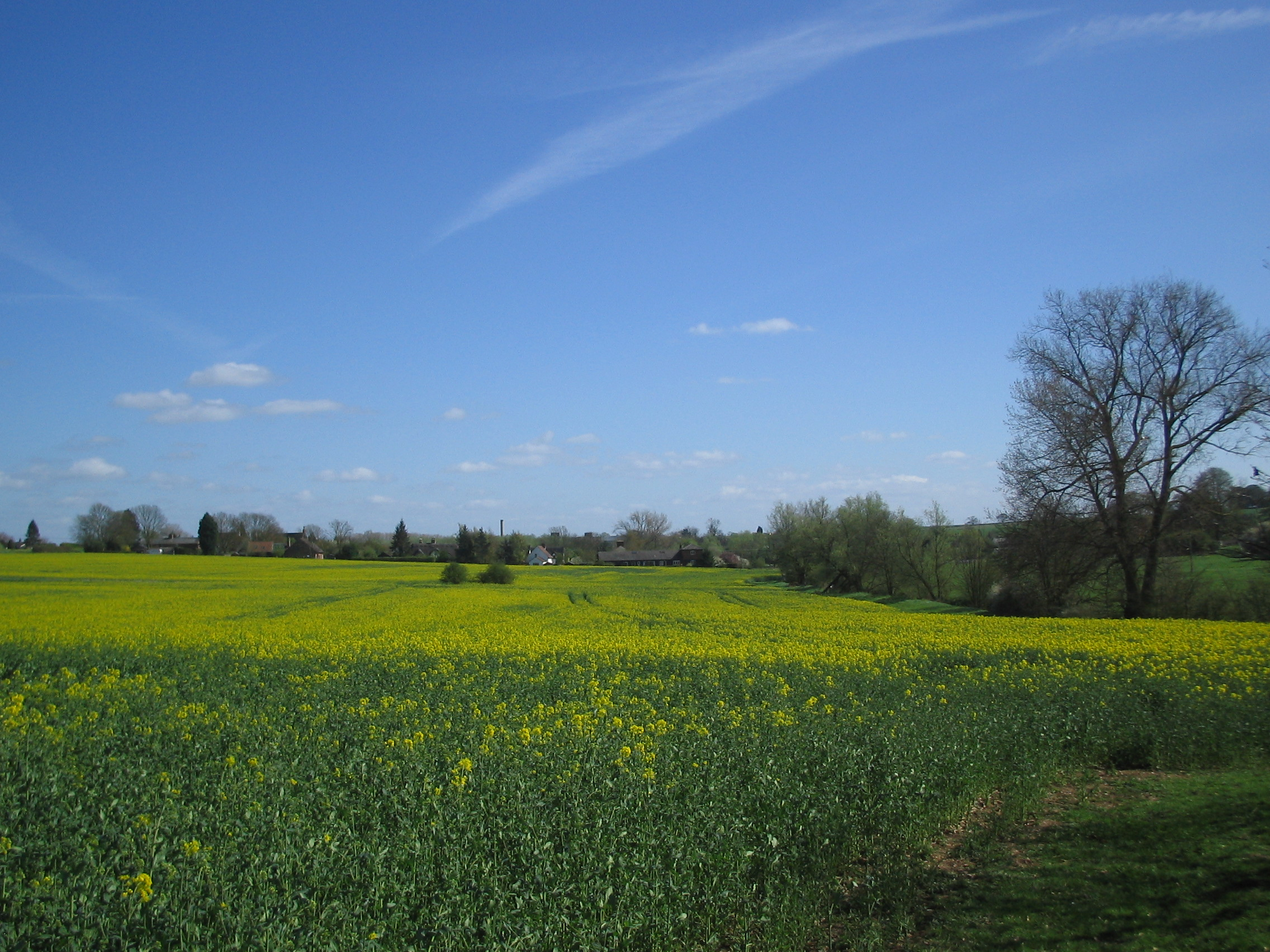
Red Field, looking towards the Street

Great Wratting is a village and civil parish in England, about four miles from Haverhill, Suffolk, in the valley of the River Stour. There is a ford across the Stour in the centre of the village, where bathing and fishing are common pursuits. The river here is heavily populated by crayfish, a non native species long since escaped from farms near the mouth of the Stour.

== Etymology ==
The origins of the name of the village are uncertain. There is a Little Wratting nearby, and a West Wratting about ten miles away. On its website, the Great Wratting Parish Council says "the village was known in the Dark Ages as Wraet Ing - Ing meaning ‘place’ and Wraet ‘madder’. The plant Madder was crucial to our ancestors as a dyeing agent, the only real source of the colour red, and it was to Great Wratting early medieval East Anglians would come when they wanted to wear or sell red clothes." Other theories suggest the name originated in the process of candlemaking, where "wratting" refers to part of the process of preparing tallow, or that the name may refer to catching rats.

== History ==
Many of the older houses in the village were once estate cottages on the Thurlow Estate, sometime owned by the Vestey family, and date to the 16th century or earlier. A large proportion are thatched, mostly with traditional Suffolk straw thatch, but with some Norfolk reed thatch. The village has an Anglican church, St Mary's, and a church room purchased by the village which is used for meetings and concerts. The old vicarage, the old school and the old post office are now - long since - family homes, as are the old forge (which has also been the old Bell pub). The village is well known for its large and hugely successful annual summer fête – held either at Great Wratting Hall (sometimes also referred to as The Hall) or Rook Tree Farm on the first Saturday in June. A local silver band plays all afternoon and people attend from miles around. The village also has a well attended carol service and festival of readings on the Friday before Christmas. The flint-walled church is Saxon in origin, its interior Victorian but with a wooden rood screen which was possibly put in by W H Smith of book-selling fame (once a resident of Little Thurlow Hall). There is a stone and cement block on the village green, sometimes thought to have been the Squire's mounting block. In fact the block was built by Prisoners of War who were welcomed to Great Wratting during WWII to work at Hall Farm; its purpose was for loading milk churns and the sugar beet which was grown as part of the war effort. When the then lady of the Hall, Mrs Roberts, was told that she could have six POWs to work on the land she went to the POW camp near Cambridge and asked for volunteers. She was so determined to make the men who volunteered welcome that she reputedly drove to London in the Blitz in order to purchase pasta for them (it not then being obtainable elsewhere). They never forgot her kindness and one, at least, chose to remain in the village after the War.

Great Wratting was mentioned in the Domesday Book of 1086.

It lays claim to being the site of the battle where Boudica defeated the 9th Legion, a claim also made for Sturmer in Essex.

== Schools ==
The nearest schools are the Church of England Primary in Thurlow, Samuel Ward Academy, in Haverhill, and Barnardiston Hall, a private preparatory school at the far end of The Street.
