= Little Bradley =

Village in Suffolk, England

Coordinates: 52.14°N 00.45°E

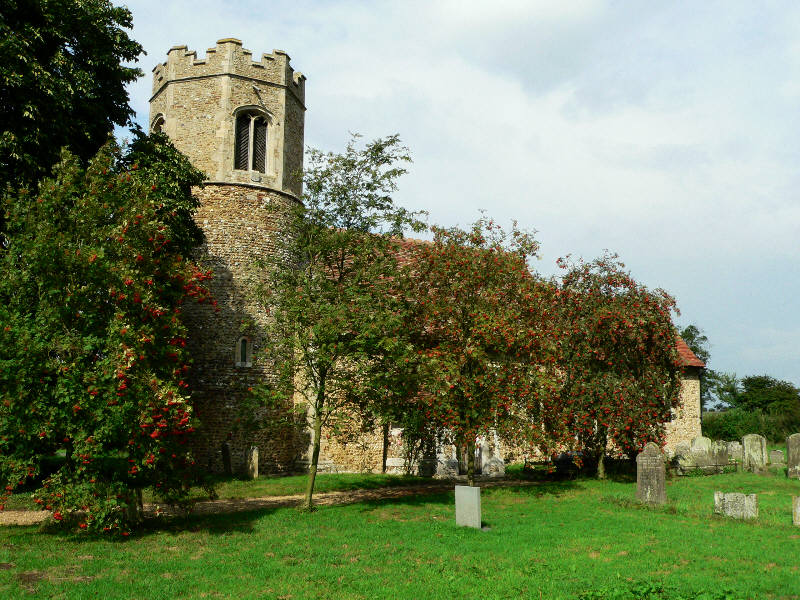
- Little Bradley All Saints

- Location within Suffolk
- Population: 60
- District: West Suffolk
- Shire county: Suffolk
- Region: East
- Country: England
- Sovereign state: United Kingdom
- Post town: Haverhill
- Postcode district: CB9
- Dialling code: 01440
- UK Parliament: West Suffolk

Little Bradley is a small village and civil parish in the West Suffolk district, in the county of Suffolk, England. According to Eilert Ekwall, the meaning of the village name is "the wide clearing." The Domesday Book records the population of Little Bradley in 1086 (including Great Bradley) to be 57. It lies in the valley of the River Stour, north of Haverhill. The population at the 2011 Census was included in the civil parish of Great Bradley.

The 11th century Church of All Saints is one of 38 existing round-tower churches in Suffolk. It is a grade I listed building.
