= Cowlinge =

Village in Suffolk, England

Coordinates: 52.161°N 0.504°E

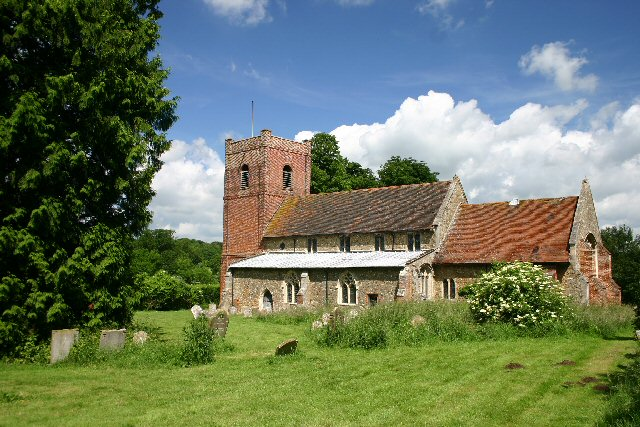
- Church of St Margaret

- Location within Suffolk
- Population: 548 (2011)
- OS grid reference: TL645636
- District: West Suffolk
- Shire county: Suffolk
- Region: East
- Country: England
- Sovereign state: United Kingdom
- Post town: NEWMARKET
- Postcode district: CB8
- Dialling code: 01638/01440
- Police: Suffolk
- Fire: Suffolk
- Ambulance: East of England
- UK Parliament: West Suffolk

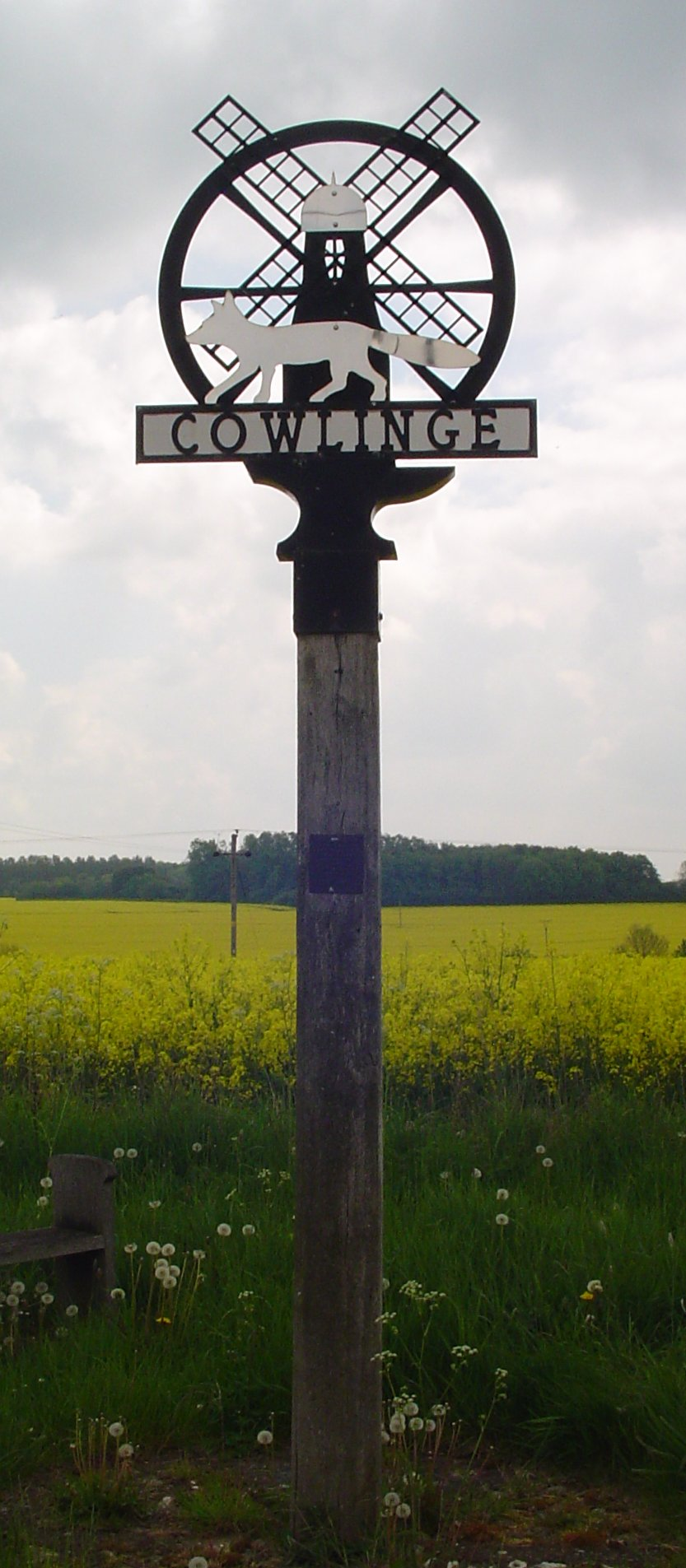
Village sign in Cowlinge

Cowlinge (/ˈkuːlɪndʒ/), pronounced "Coolinje", is a village and civil parish in the West Suffolk district of Suffolk in eastern England close to the Cambridgeshire and Essex borders.

== Village name ==
Over the years it has been known by many names:

- Culinge - 11th century.
- Culinges - 1195.
- Cooling - David Elisha Davy in the early 19th century.

The name probably means the home or settlement of Culs or Cula's people.

== The village ==
Cowlinge village encompasses a large area of countryside and the local parish stretches some three miles (5 km) from its northern border with Lidgate to its southern border near HMP Highpoint, formerly Stradishall airfield. Its north-west border is the county boundary between Suffolk and the parish of Kirtling in Cambridgeshire. At this end of the parish is the 200-acre (0.81 km^{2}) Branches Park estate, which was laid out by Lancelot "Capability" Brown. The mansion, dating from the 1720s, was home to the Dickins, Usborne, Tonge and Parsons families, among others, but was demolished in the 1950s and replaced by three large residences.

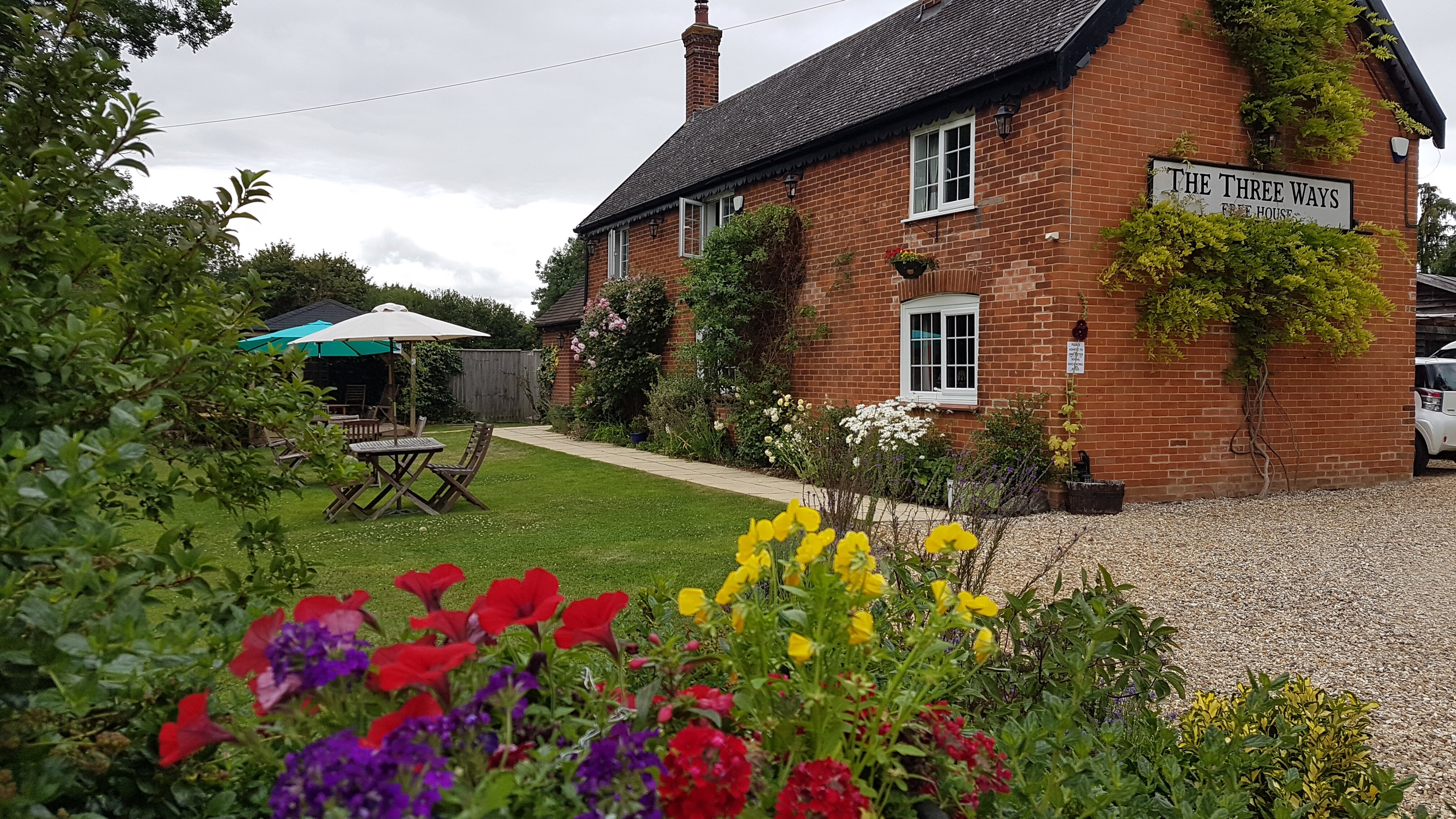
The Three Ways Public House

The oldest building in the village is the mediaeval Church of St. Margaret of Antioch. This lovely building was built approximately 650 years ago and is still in regular use for Christian worship. The building has evolved over the years and is the product of a great deal of love and care which people of many periods and traditions have lavished upon it.

The 19th-century former village school is now a private residence.

At the centre of the village is the Public House The Three Ways.

Another prominent feature in the village is the WWI Memorial situated at Tillbrooks Hill and bordering Queen Street.

== Tourism ==
- National Horse-racing Museum & Tours 7 Miles
- Ickworth House, Park & Garden 7 Miles
- Newmarket Racecourses 8 Miles
