= Chevington, Suffolk =

Village in Suffolk, England

Coordinates: 52.206°N 0.614°E

Chevington
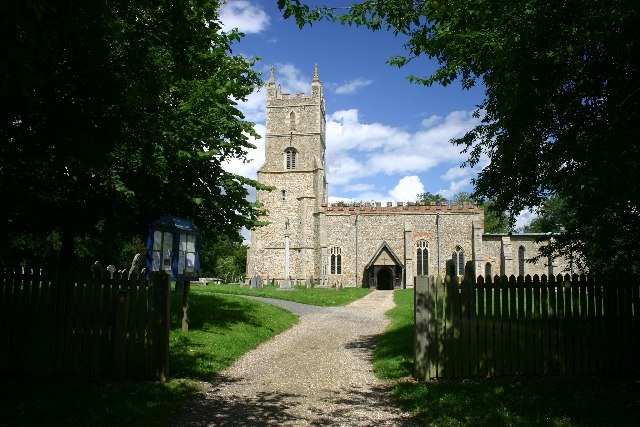
- All Saints Church Chevington

- Location within Suffolk
- Population: 630 (2001); 602 (2011)
- District: West Suffolk
- Shire county: Suffolk
- Region: East
- Country: England
- Sovereign state: United Kingdom
- Post town: Bury St. Edmunds
- Postcode district: IP29
- Police: Suffolk
- Fire: Suffolk
- Ambulance: East of England
- UK Parliament: West Suffolk

Chevington is a village and civil parish in the West Suffolk district of Suffolk in East Anglia, England. Located around 10 km south-west of Bury St Edmunds, in 2005 its population was 630, reducing to 602 at the 2011 Census. The parish also contains the hamlets of Broad Green and Tan Office Green.

== Name ==
The name Chevington is from Old English Ceofan-tūn, meaning the farm of a man named Ceofa (genitive case Ceofan). It appeared in Domesday Book as Ceuentuna; 200 years later it was typically Chevintun or Cheveton and from 1535 the modern spelling Chevington is recorded. The etymology proves that the -ing- syllable is not original, but is by analogy with similar names.

== Historical writings ==
In 1870–72, John Marius Wilson's Imperial Gazetteer of England and Wales described the village as:

CHEVINGTON, a parish in Thingoe district, Suffolk; 2¾ miles S of Saxham r. station, and 5 SW by W of Bury St. Edmunds. It has a post office under Bury St. Edmunds. Acres, 2,429. Real property, £3,889. Population, 621. Houses, 126. The property is much subdivided. The living is a rectory in the diocese of Ely. Value, £396. Patron, the Rev. J. White. The church is ancient. There is an endowed school, and charities £22.

In 1887, John Bartholomew also wrote an entry on Chevington in the Gazetteer of the British Isles with a much shorter description:

Chevington, parish, W. Suffolk, 5 miles SW. of Bury St. Edmunds, 2429 acres, population 556; P.O.

== Demography ==
In the 2001 census, Chevington had a population of 603 with 248 households.

=== Population change ===
Population growth in Chevington from 1801 to 1891
Year	1801	1811	1821	1831	1841	1851	1881	1891
Population	445	490	590	573	624	600	556	545
Source: A Vision of Britain Through Time

Population growth in Chevington from 1901 to 2001
Year	1901	1911	1921	1931	1951	1961	2001
Population	457	471	466	417	358	373	603
Source: A Vision of Britain Through Time
