= Denston =

Village in Suffolk, England

Coordinates: 52.145°N 0.577°E

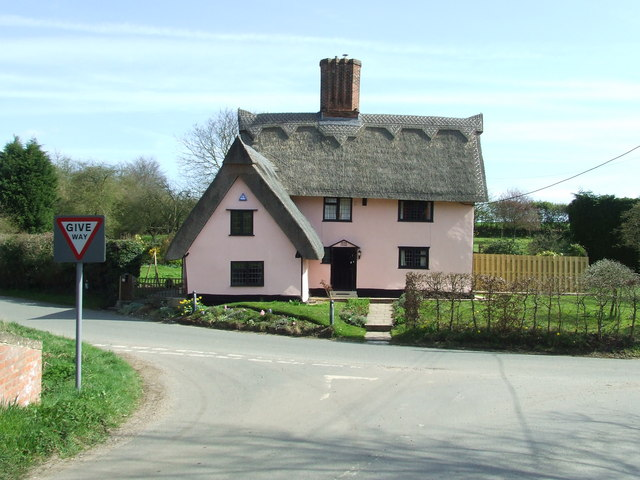
- Cottage in Denston

- Location within Suffolk
- Population: 1,043 (2011 Census)
- District: West Suffolk
- Shire county: Suffolk
- Region: East
- Country: England
- Sovereign state: United Kingdom
- Post town: Newmarket
- Postcode district: CB8
- Dialling code: 01440
- Police: Suffolk
- Fire: Suffolk
- Ambulance: East of England
- UK Parliament: West Suffolk

Denston is a village and civil parish in the West Suffolk district of Suffolk, England. Located around eight miles south-west of Bury St Edmunds, in 2005 its population was 120. The entire village is designated as a conservation area. There is an Anglican church whose dedication is to St Nicholas. Denston is located just south of Wickhambrook.

Denston has been described as

"DENARDISTON, or Denston, a parish in Risbridge district, Suffolk; on an affluent of the river Stour, 3¾ miles ENE of Haverhill r. station. Post town, Keddington, under Newmarket"

-John Marius Wilson, 1870–72

== History ==
A remote village in Suffolk, Denston is home to Suffolk's finest small church. Built by the Denston family in the 1460s, it has been subtly altered over time to serve a small group of priests, "about 50 years before the Reformation would sweep them away".

All of the church apart from the older tower was created by the family, however, those priests were a community all too poor to carry out any restoration on the building. It is "because of this it has a higher degree of surviving medieval liturgical integrity than virtually any other Suffolk church".

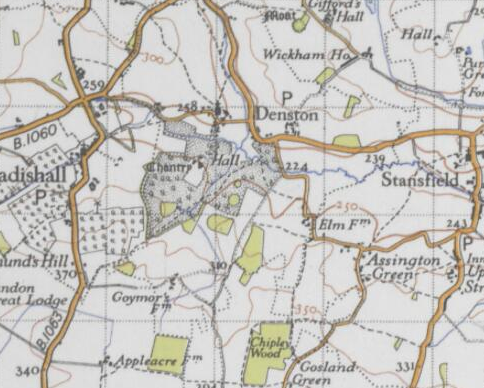
Great Britain 20th-century map of Denston.

The writer Arthur Koestler owned a house in the village during the 1970s.

== Denston Hall ==
Denston Hall is a grade II listed building, and became officially listed on 19 December 1961. The local authority that listed this building was St. Edmundsbury Borough Council. "The Hall has an interesting history. In 1564 Henry Cheyney made over the manor of Denston to William Burd without licence to alienate from the crown".

An 18th-century house, it has 16th-century buildings at the rear, and also the remains of a 16th-century house that is said to have occupied part of the grounds. The Denston estate was then lost in 1565 but was later returned to William Burd. He died in 1591, passing the estate to his son in 1602, where it was again re-seized by the crown for debt and then "leased to Sir John Robinson".

Robinson then bought Denston Hall in 1617, and it was kept within his family until the early 19th century. Some parts of the buildings are older than others, however; the Great Hall is dated early 18th century, evident with red and blue brick headers, a raised brick band and parapet. There are "2 storeys and attics. 2:5:2 window range on the east front, 3 window range on the inner faces of the wings (some blocked), and 4 window range on the south front".

It has a lot of Tudor features throughout the house, with Tudor arched doorways with boarded floors and arches. It also has brick hood moulds. "At the south end there is a fine room with moulded beam and joist ceiling with an embattled frieze and carved spandrels to the arched braced tie beams. There are some linen fold panels with heads in roundels. The Roof tiled, with a chimney stack with 2 diagonally set shafts."

It is because of this decoration and roof layout that it has been suggested this room was used mainly as a chapel. There are also huge double-hung windows, with rooms both off to the left and right of the circular hall. This hall is said to be dated back to 1770, with Adam Style ornamentation in the ceilings, and 18th-century twisted balusters on the staircases.

== Demographics ==
=== Population ===
Denston has a first recorded population of 277 people in 1811. This slowly grew to peak in 1841, with a total population of 341 people. The population of Denston has largely declined since. It dropped dramatically between 1841 and 1881 so the total population in 1881 was 285 people. This decline continued in 1891 to 266 people and 242 people in 1901. In the early 19th century, the population was dropping further to 199 in 1921 and in 1961 was just 179. Neighborhood statistics show that in 2001, the population stood at 126 people, and in 2011 was recorded at 104 people. This emphasises the change that has come about to the area of Denston, perhaps showing just how small the parish is today. This decline in population comes from the modernisation of jobs and lifestyle. This perhaps led to migration to inner city, more urban areas, especially after 1960. Technical advances meant a more labour-based workforce.

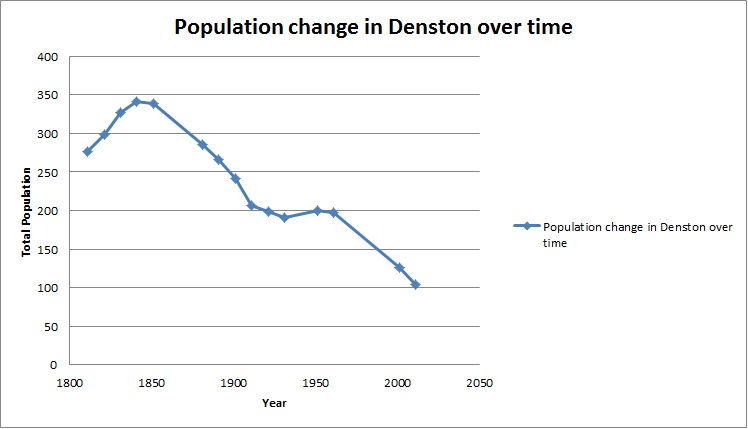
A graph to show the change in population of Denston over time.

=== Qualifications ===
Denston's population shows that 31% of people have a level 4 qualification or above, suggesting a well-educated community. That have attended university and gained degrees. However, also 17% of people do not have any qualifications, and only 2% of people have an apprenticeship. There is also 2% with other qualifications.

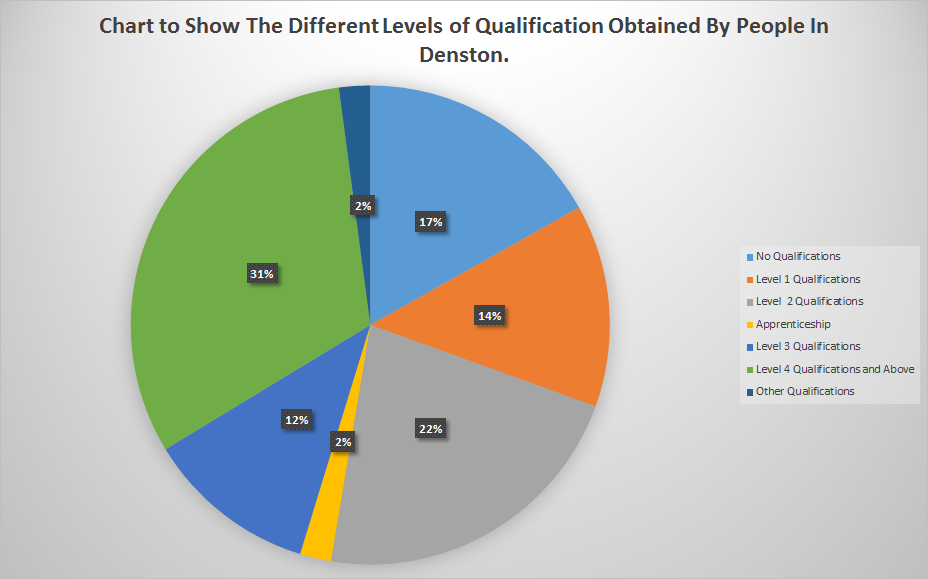
Chart to show the different levels of qualification obtained by people in Denston

=== Occupations ===
In Denston, both population and occupation have changed majorly over time. In 1881, most occupations were agriculture and manual labour based, but in 2011, in Denston they are mainly professional-based. In the 1881 census, it shows that in Denston, there were 2% of men working as "professionals" and 4% women. In 2011, this has largely increased to show 55% of men and 40% of women in Denston now work as "professionals". This could be because nowadays, there is a wider availability of established jobs at international firms. In 2011, there were more women working in the "domestic service or offices", but there has been a major decline in those working in agriculture in Denston. In 1881, 48% of men worked in agriculture as this was a main occupation, but today 0% of men and women work in agriculture. This is because the land use has changed around Denston, as housing has been built. Therefore, less manual labour is needed. Manual labour in the categories "machines and implements" and "carriages and harnesses" still exists in Denston, but is more likely to be machine operators or skilled trades. In 1881, 2% of men and 1% of women worked in "food and lodging". In 2011, no men worked in this category and yet 10% of women in Denston work in this category. A small number of Denston's population used to work in the "dress" category, but in 2011 10% of women work in "dress". This could be because today more women commercially work within the fashion industry, and have higher involvement compared to in 1881. "Works with vegetable substances" has largely increased from 1% of males in 1881 to 20% in 2011. This is because of advances in agriculture and increase of food mass production. In 2011, there is a larger proportion of "unspecified occupations" in Denston. This could be because many jobs nowadays are often complex and cross boundary, so are not easily specified. There was a larger proportion of "unknown occupation" in 1881, but not in 2011, this could be because more labour force roles are specified, and Denston has a higher number of "professionals" nowadays.

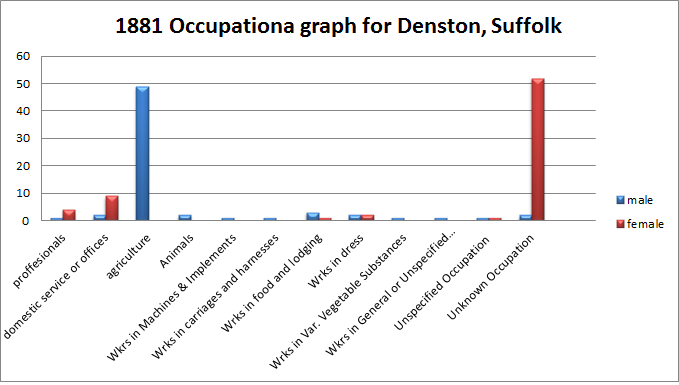
A graph to show the varying occupations of the residents of Denston, Suffolk, in 1881.

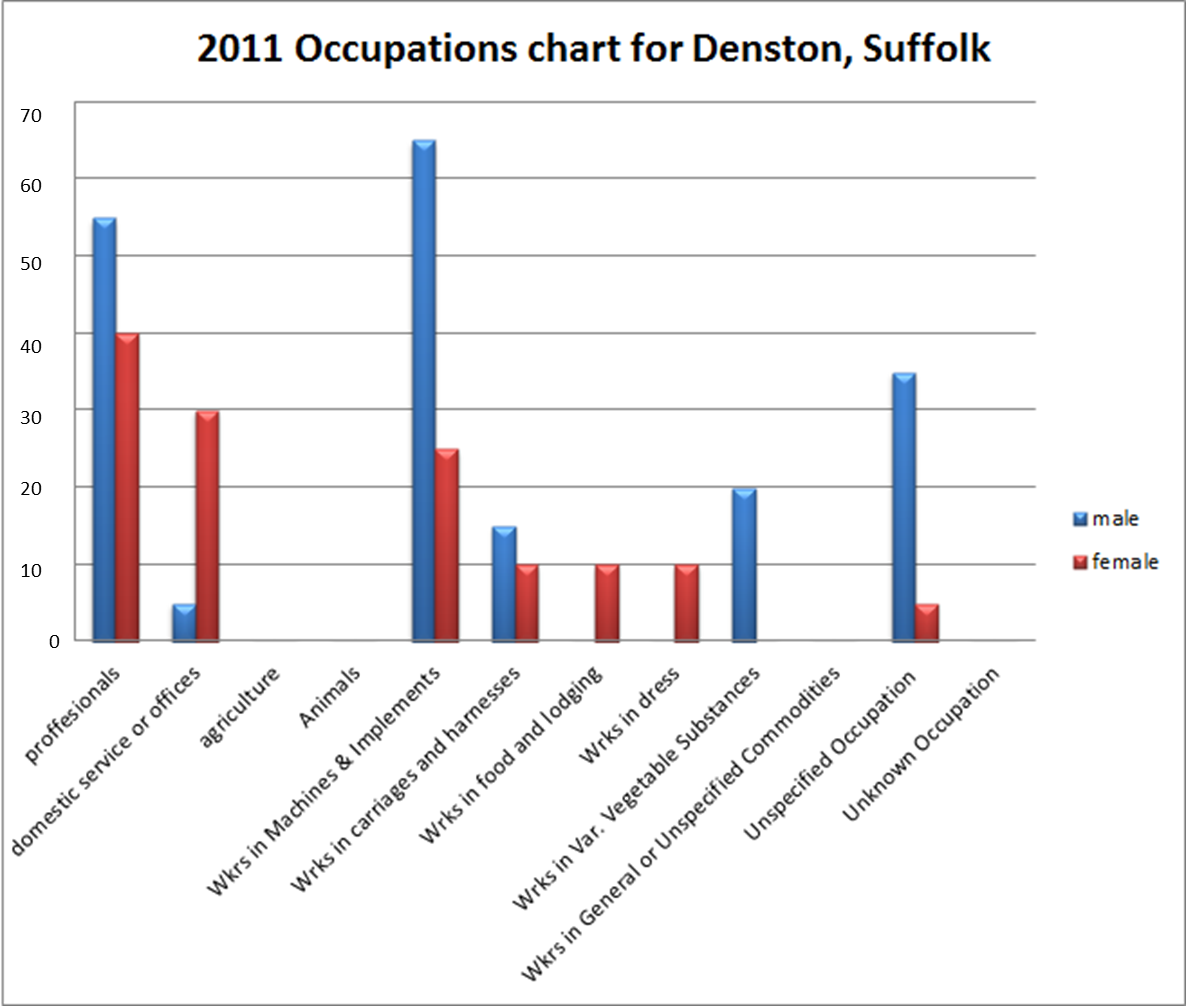
A graph to show the varying occupations of residents in Denston, Suffolk 2011.
