= Barrow, Suffolk =

Village in Suffolk, England

Coordinates: 52.233°N 0.583°E

Barrow
- Location within Suffolk
- Interactive map of Barrow
- Population: 1,960 (2021 census)
- OS grid reference: TL762637
- District: West Suffolk
- Shire county: Suffolk
- Region: East
- Country: England
- Sovereign state: United Kingdom
- Post town: Bury St Edmunds
- Postcode district: IP29
- Dialling code: 01284

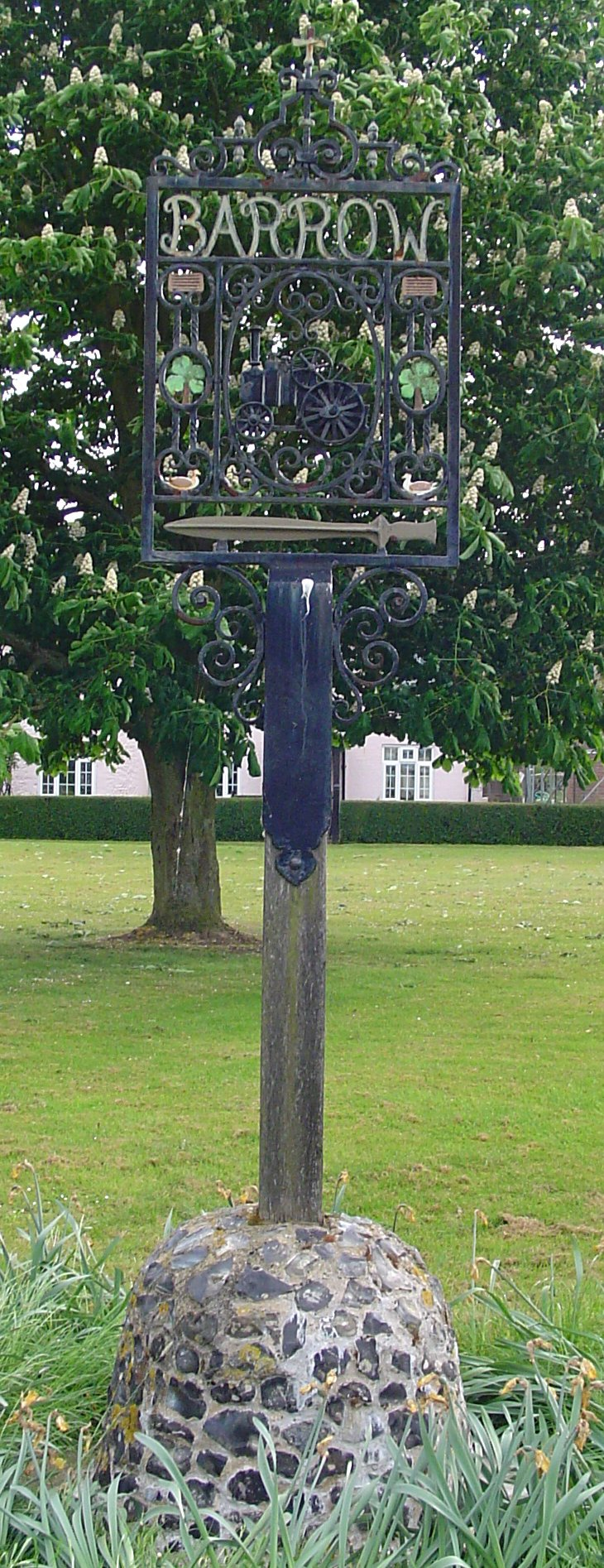
Village sign in Barrow

Barrow is a village and civil parish in the West Suffolk district of Suffolk, England, about eight miles west of Bury St Edmunds. According to Eilert Ekwall the meaning of the village name is grove or wood, hill or mound. The Domesday Book records the population of Barrow in 1086 to have been 27. By 1901 the population was 967. It rose to 1429 in 2001 and 1960 in the 2021 according tocensus records.

== Background ==
A circular walk around the village is known as 'walking around Crattle' named after its main feature - Crattle Hill. The walk is 2.45 miles long and passes All Saints Church, Park Pond, and the cemetery. The small hamlet of Burthorpe Green is attached to Barrow.

The playing field in the centre of the village is bordered by 19 poplar trees.

On the small road to Risby is a large steep hill known locally as Bread & Water Hill.

The village has two Public Houses - The Three Horseshoes, and The Weeping Willow.

In 2005 Suffolk Academy a sports and Martial Arts Centre was built opposite Barrow Church by Glen Moulds a black belt 5th Dan in Shotokan Karate

Barrow is 2 miles from the A14 Trunk road. Villages nearby include Higham, Denham, Risby, Gt Saxham, Lt Saxham, Ousden, Wickhambrook, Hargrave, Tuddenham, Chevington, Chedburgh, Dalham, and Gazeley.

The parish church is the 14th century All Saints Church, situated a mile from the main village close to the boundary with Higham. The church contains an altar tomb in the chancel with effigy brasses, arms, and long eulogistic inscription, for Sir Clement Higham (d. 1571).

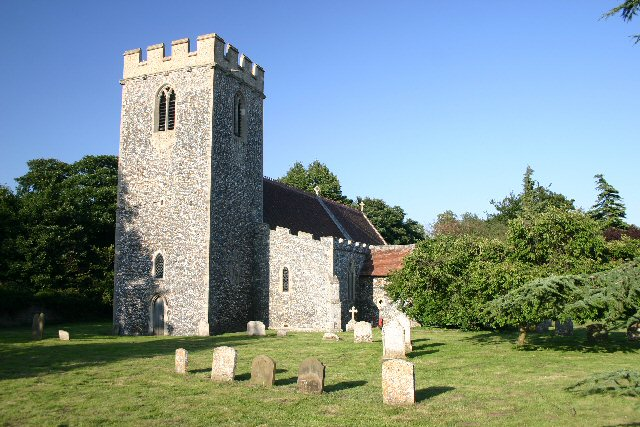
Church of All Saints

There is also a small Baptist Chapel in the village.

Mary Beale, one of the most successful professional female Baroque-era portrait painters of the late 17th century, was born in the village rectory.

Near the village school is a stone set into the pavement that is said to mark where a highwayman was once hanged. Mr Macrow of Barrow Hall was collecting the parish tithes in 1789 when he was shot at by a highwayman. The villain's horse lost a shoe, which enabled him to be tracked down and hanged on that spot - even though he didn't actually hit his intended victim. A tale has attached itself to the stone that it is supposed to turn over at midnight on every New Year's Eve.

On 29 May 1980, a low-flying RAF Hawker Hunter T7 (XL597 of 216 Squadron) fighter aircraft crashed, following a loss of power due to a fuel systems fault, into fields south of Little Saxham church. The crew bailed out over Barrow. There followed an RAF and police recovery operation - which included an extensive search of Barrow for an ejector seat. An RAF air-sea rescue helicopter attempted a landing on Barrow village green, seemingly giving up due to overhead cables.

A butterfly farm was opened in Colethorpe Lane, Barrow in March 1987 by Tropical Butterflies (Barrow) Limited - its proprietor being the former Barrow G.P., Doctor J Sumpton; the farm closed in the September 1989. The farm included (constructed in 1988) a 15-inch narrow-gauge railway loop 350 yards in length - with a single locomotive named 'Chough'. This locomotive still runs in Bear Creek Park Miniature Railway, Surrey, British Columbia, Canada.

== Demography ==
According to the Office for National Statistics, at the time of the United Kingdom Census 2001, Barrow had a population of 1,429 with 590 households.

=== Population change ===
Population growth in Barrow from 1801 to 1891
Year	1801	1811	1821	1831	1841	1851	1881	1891
Population	614	645	755	856	995	1,120	910	952
Source: A Vision of Britain Through Time

Population growth in Barrow from 1901 to 2001
Year	1901	1911	1921	1931	1951	1961	2001	2021
Population	967	950	810	720	713	856	1,429	1,960
Source: A Vision of Britain Through Time
