= Little Wratting =

Village in Suffolk, England

Coordinates: 52.097°N 0.463°E

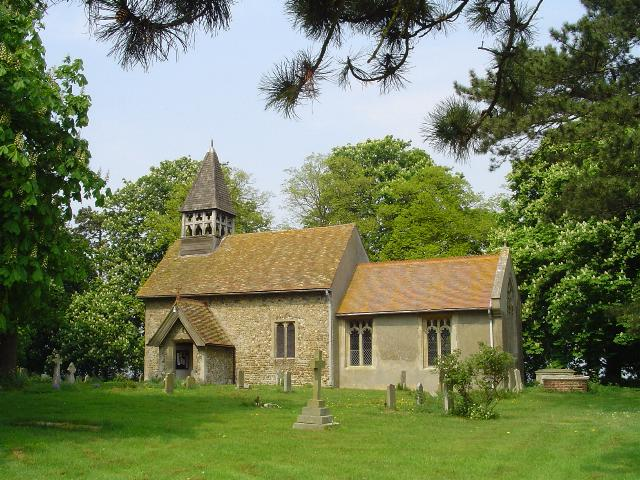
- St Mary's church

- Location within Suffolk
- Population: 160 (2005); 147 (2011)
- District: West Suffolk
- Shire county: Suffolk
- Region: East
- Country: England
- Sovereign state: United Kingdom
- Post town: HAVERHILL
- Postcode district: CB9
- Police: Suffolk
- Fire: Suffolk
- Ambulance: East of England
- UK Parliament: West Suffolk

Little Wratting is a small village and civil parish in the West Suffolk district of Suffolk in eastern England. Located on the north-eastern edge of Haverhill, in 2005 its population was 160.
