= Grade I listed buildings in St Edmundsbury =

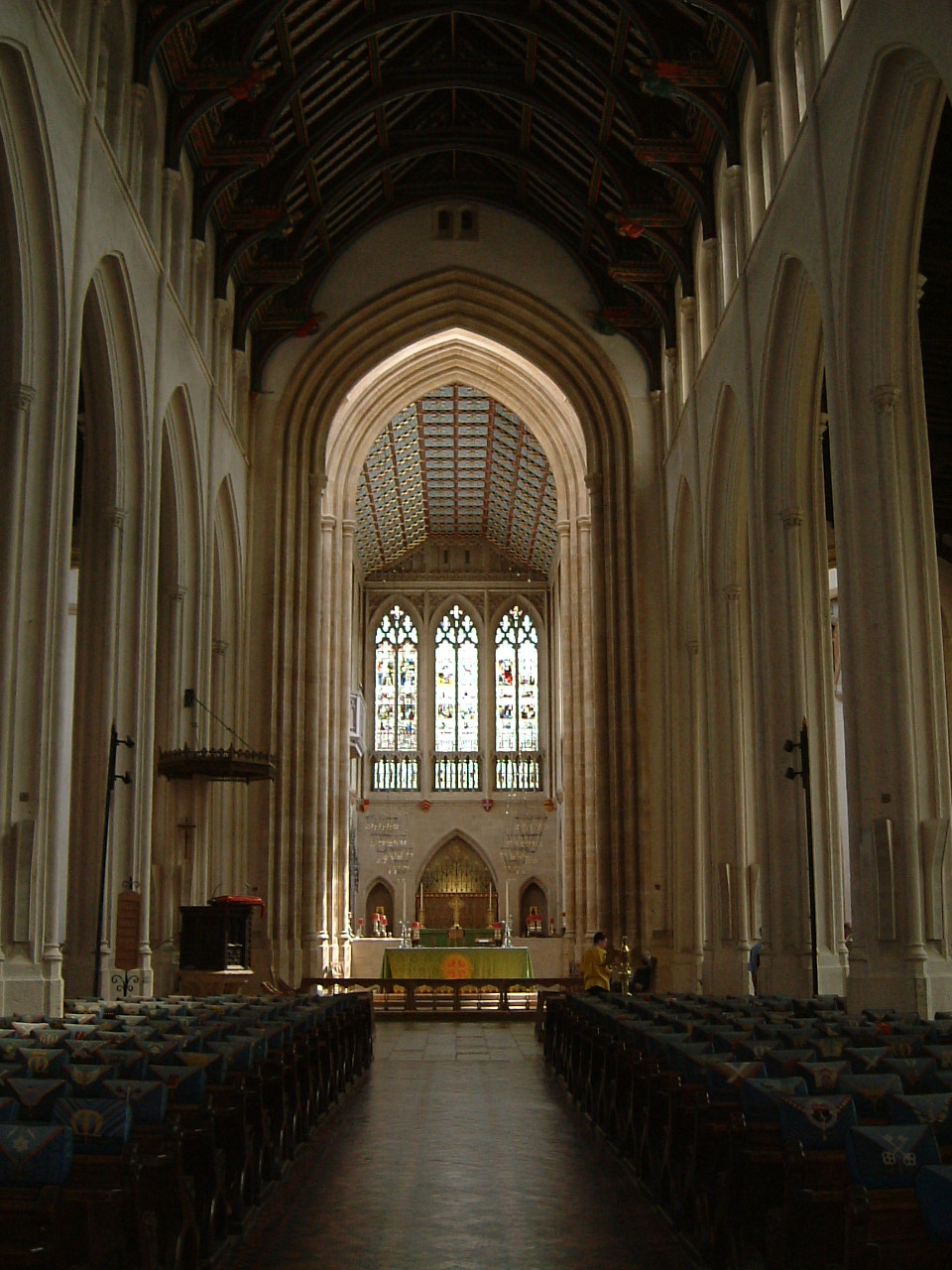
The interior of Suffolk's Anglican cathedral, St James in Bury St Edmunds.

There are many Grade I listed buildings in St Edmundsbury, a former non-metropolitan district and borough in the county of Suffolk in England that takes its name from the town of Bury St Edmunds.

In the United Kingdom, the term listed building refers to a building or other structure officially designated as being of "exceptional architectural or historic special interest"; Grade I structures are those considered to be "buildings of "exceptional interest, sometimes considered to be internationally important. Just 2.5% of listed buildings are Grade I." The total number of listed buildings in England is 372,905. Listing was begun by a provision in the Town and Country Planning Act 1947. Listing a building imposes severe restrictions on what the owner might wish to change or modify in the structure or its fittings. In England, the authority for listing under the Planning (Listed Buildings and Conservation Areas) Act 1990 rests with English Heritage, a non-departmental public body sponsored by the Department for Culture, Media and Sport.

St Edmundsbury was a local government district with its administrative headquarters at Bury St Edmunds, which is the third settlement by size in Suffolk. The other towns in the area were Clare and Haverhill. The number of inhabitants of the area is 102,900 with a density of 157 inhabitants per km^{2}. The whole district is parished. In 2019 the district was abolished and became part of West Suffolk.

== List ==
Name	Location	Type	Completed (Note: The date given is the date used by Historic England as significant for the initial building or that of an important part in the structure's description.)	Date designated	Grid ref. (Note: Sometimes known as OSGB36, the grid reference is based on the British national grid reference system used by the Ordnance Survey.) Geo-coordinates	Notes	Entry number (Note: The "List Entry Number" is a unique number assigned to each listed building and scheduled monument by Historic England.)	Image
Church of St Peter	Ampton	Parish Church	15th century	14 July 1955	TL8661471181; 52°18′25″N 0°44′09″E		1198006	Church of St Peter More images
Church of St Peter & St Paul	Bardwell	Parish Church	15th century	14 July 1955	TL9410673620; 52°19′35″N 0°50′49″E		1376891	Church of St Peter & St Paul More images
Church of St Andrew	Barningham	Church	14th century	14 July 1955	TL9678576892; 52°21′17″N 0°53′17″E		1376995	Church of St Andrew More images
Church of All Saints	Barrow	Church	Norman	14 July 1955	TL7602764619; 52°15′06″N 0°34′38″E		1376863	Church of All Saints More images
Coldham Hall	Stanningfield	Country House	1574	14 July 1955	TL8641455860; 52°10′10″N 0°43′28″E		1229768	Coldham Hall More images
St Nicholas' Church	Stanningfield	Church	15th century	14 July 1955	TL8773156346; 52°10′24″N 0°44′38″E		1229767	St Nicholas' Church More images
St Georges's Church	Bradfield St George	Church	c. 1500	14 July 1955	TL9072159932; 52°12′17″N 0°47′23″E		1228901	St Georges's Church More images
Brockley Hall	Brockley	Farmhouse	14th century	27 January 1984	TL8265355526; 52°10′04″N 0°40′10″E		1229174	Brockley Hall More images
Abbey Gate and Gatehouse	Bury St Edmunds	Abbey	1353	7 August 1952	TL8554464220; 52°14′42″N 0°42′59″E		1375545	Abbey Gate and Gatehouse More images
Abbots Bridge and adjoining east precinct wall	Bury St Edmunds	Abbey	14th century	7 August 1952	TL8578864356; 52°14′46″N 0°43′12″E		1375552	Abbots Bridge and adjoining east precinct wall More images
Alwyne House and Alwyne Cottage	Bury St Edmunds	House	19th century	7 August 1952	TL8569264313; 52°14′44″N 0°43′07″E		1375554	Alwyne House and Alwyne Cottage More images
Athenaeum and attached railings	Bury St Edmunds	House	17th century	7 August 1952	TL8553064136; 52°14′39″N 0°42′58″E		1376999	Athenaeum and attached railings More images
Cathedral Church of St James	Bury St Edmunds	Cathedral	16th century	7 August 1952	TL8559764117; 52°14′38″N 0°43′01″E		1377001	Cathedral Church of St James More images
Church of St Mary	Bury St Edmunds	Church	15th century	7 August 1952	TL8560463945; 52°14′33″N 0°43′01″E		1342765	Church of St Mary More images
Manor House	Bury St Edmunds	House	1738	7 August 1952	TL8573763933; 52°14′32″N 0°43′08″E		1022551	Manor House More images
Market Cross	Bury St Edmunds	Town Hall	1780	7 August 1952	TL8525364308; 52°14′45″N 0°42′44″E		1076930	Market Cross More images
Moyse's Hall	Bury St Edmunds	Merchants House	12th century	7 August 1952	TL8530164370; 52°14′47″N 0°42′46″E		1076931	Moyse's Hall More images
Norman Tower	Bury St Edmunds	Tower	1120-1148	7 August 1952	TL8557264078; 52°14′37″N 0°43′00″E		1375555	Norman Tower More images
North wall of Great Court of the Abbey	Bury St Edmunds	Wall	12th century	7 August 1952	TL8558364292; 52°14′44″N 0°43′01″E		1375553	North wall of Great Court of the Abbey More images
Northgate House	Bury St Edmunds	Timber Framed House	18th century	7 August 1952	TL8555864450; 52°14′49″N 0°43′00″E		1022615	Northgate House More images
Numbers 1, 1a, 2 and 3 West Front and Sampsons Tower	Bury St Edmunds	Abbey	c. 1200	7 August 1952	TL8564664094; 52°14′37″N 0°43′04″E		1375539	Numbers 1, 1a, 2 and 3 West Front and Sampsons Tower More images
Precinct wall of former vineyard along north side of Kevelaer Way	Bury St Edmunds	Wall	12th century	7 August 1952	TL8598664051; 52°14′36″N 0°43′22″E		1375550	Upload Photo
Precinct wall on south to east of Shire Hall (Shire Hall not included)	Bury St Edmunds	Wall	12th century	7 August 1952	TL8584363983; 52°14′34″N 0°43′14″E		1375549	Upload Photo
Precinct wall to north of the former Abbey of St Edmund	Bury St Edmunds	Wall	12th century	7 August 1952	TL8573764362; 52°14′46″N 0°43′09″E		1375548	Precinct wall to north of the former Abbey of St Edmund More images
Precinct wall to north of the Abbey Gate	Bury St Edmunds	Wall	14th century	7 August 1952	TL8553664246; 52°14′42″N 0°42′58″E		1375546	Precinct wall to north of the Abbey Gate More images
Precinct wall to south of the Abbey Gate	Bury St Edmunds	Wall	14th century	7 August 1952	TL8554664199; 52°14′41″N 0°42′59″E		1375547	Precinct wall to south of the Abbey Gate
Provosts House and Number 4 Churchyard (Clopton Cottage)	Bury St Edmunds	House	c. 1730	7 August 1952	TL8569964076; 52°14′37″N 0°43′07″E		1375558	Provosts House and Number 4 Churchyard (Clopton Cottage) More images
Ruins of Abbey Church of St Edmund	Bury St Edmunds	Abbey	12th century	7 August 1952	TL8575064123; 52°14′38″N 0°43′09″E		1375540	Ruins of Abbey Church of St Edmund More images
Ruins of abbey dovecote and part of wall	Bury St Edmunds	Abbey	12th century	12 July 1972	TL8576764277; 52°14′43″N 0°43′11″E		1375544	Ruins of abbey dovecote and part of wall More images
Ruins of Chapel of the Charnel	Bury St Edmunds	Charnel House	Late 13th century	7 August 1952	TL8570264004; 52°14′34″N 0°43′07″E		1375556	Ruins of Chapel of the Charnel More images
Ruins of Hall of Pleas and south wall of Great Court	Bury St Edmunds	Abbey	13th century	7 August 1952	TL8558064176; 52°14′40″N 0°43′01″E		1375543	Ruins of Hall of Pleas and south wall of Great Court
Ruins to east and north of abbey church	Bury St Edmunds	Abbey	12th century	7 August 1952	TL8574764163; 52°14′39″N 0°43′09″E		1375541	Ruins to east and north of abbey church More images
Ruins to the north of the cloister	Bury St Edmunds	Abbey	12th century	7 August 1952	TL8571964222; 52°14′41″N 0°43′08″E		1375542	Ruins to the north of the cloister
St Saviours Hospital	Bury St Edmunds	Chapel	1185	7 August 1952	TL8535665255; 52°15′15″N 0°42′51″E		1363685	St Saviours Hospital More images
Bury St Edmunds Guildhall and attached railings	Bury St Edmunds	Guildhall	15th century	7 August 1952	TL8526864059; 52°14′37″N 0°42′44″E		1363726	Bury St Edmunds Guildhall and attached railings More images
Theatre Royal	Bury St Edmunds	Theatre	1819	7 August 1952	TL8561863739; 52°14′26″N 0°43′02″E		1142285	Theatre Royal More images
Unitarian Chapel	Bury St Edmunds	Presbyterian Chapel	1711	7 August 1952	TL8536764057; 52°14′37″N 0°42′49″E		1248301	Unitarian Chapel More images
Wall to east of former abbey vineyard	Bury St Edmunds	Wall	19th century	7 August 1952	TL8599064244; 52°14′42″N 0°43′22″E		1375551	Upload Photo
Northgate Street, Nos. 9-11	Bury St Edmunds	Open Hall House	15th century	7 August 1952	TL8555464472; 52°14′50″N 0°43′00″E		1022624	Northgate Street, Nos. 9-11
Guildhall Street, No 81	Bury St Edmunds	House	18th century	7 August 1952	TL8524264068; 52°14′37″N 0°42′43″E		1363718	Guildhall Street, No 81 More images
Church of St Mary	Cavendish	Church	15th century	19 December 1961	TL8051346549; 52°05′16″N 0°38′00″E		1031774	Church of St Mary More images
Church of St John the Baptist	Chevington	Church	c. 1500	14 July 1955	TL7887960122; 52°12′37″N 0°37′00″E		1186968	Church of St John the Baptist More images
Chapel to Clare Priory	Clare	Chapel	1248	19 December 1961	TL7700045000; 52°04′30″N 0°34′53″E		1285828	Chapel to Clare Priory More images
Clare Priory	Clare	Priory	1604	19 December 1961	TL7696444990; 52°04′30″N 0°34′51″E		1376670	Clare Priory More images
Cliftons	Clare	House	16th century	19 December 1961	TL7674945054; 52°04′32″N 0°34′40″E		1180531	Cliftons More images
Nethergate Hotel	Clare	House	1644	19 December 1961	TL7686645130; 52°04′35″N 0°34′46″E		1031719	Nethergate Hotel More images
Parish Church of SS Peter and Paul	Clare	Church	15th century	19 December 1961	TL7696445461; 52°04′45″N 0°34′52″E		1194114	Parish Church of SS Peter and Paul More images
The Ancient House	Clare	Timber Framed House	15th century	20 February 1958	TL7694445415; 52°04′44″N 0°34′51″E		1376700	The Ancient House More images
Church of St Mary	Coney Weston	Parish Church	14th century	14 July 1955	TL9715978395; 52°22′05″N 0°53′40″E		1031174	Church of St Mary More images
Church of St Margaret	Cowlinge	Church	14th century	19 December 1961	TL7184654931; 52°09′57″N 0°30′40″E		1376713	Church of St Margaret More images
The Iron Bridge, Culford Park	Culford	Bridge	c. 1803	15 May 1996	TL8279970401; 52°18′05″N 0°40′46″E		1269105	The Iron Bridge, Culford Park More images
Church of St Nicholas	Denston	Church	15th century	19 December 1961	TL7601752954; 52°08′49″N 0°34′16″E		1031706	Church of St Nicholas More images
Church of St Genevieve	Euston	Church	1676	14 July 1955	TL9003478479; 52°22′17″N 0°47′24″E		1376962	Church of St Genevieve More images
Church of St Peter	Fakenham Magna	Parish Church	15th century	14 July 1955	TL9105276614; 52°21′15″N 0°48′14″E		1376921	Church of St Peter More images
Church of All Saints	Fornham All Saints	Parish Church	12th century	14 July 1955	TL8375267623; 52°16′34″N 0°41′31″E		1031300	Church of All Saints More images
Church of the Holy Innocents	Great Barton	Church	13th century	14 July 1955	TL8899166042; 52°15′36″N 0°46′04″E		1376986	Church of the Holy Innocents More images
Church of St Peter	Great Livermere	Parish Church	13th century	14 July 1955	TL8851771384; 52°18′30″N 0°45′50″E		1283741	Church of St Peter More images
Church of St Thomas a Becket	Great Whelnetham	Church	14th century	14 July 1955	TL8781359343; 52°12′01″N 0°44′49″E		1278722	Church of St Thomas a Becket More images
Church of St Mary	Hawkedon	Church	15th century	19 December 1961	TL7973552968; 52°08′45″N 0°37′31″E		1031651	Church of St Mary More images
Swan's Hall	Hawkedon	Jettied House	16th century	19 December 1961	TL7968451205; 52°07′48″N 0°37′25″E		1031656	Swan's Hall More images
Thurston End Hall	Hawkedon	House	1607	19 December 1961	TL7944851855; 52°08′09″N 0°37′14″E		1031655	Thurston End Hall More images
All Saints Church	Hawstead	Church	16th century	14 July 1955	TL8557959258; 52°12′01″N 0°42′51″E		1279106	All Saints Church More images
Church of St John Lateran	Hengrave	Church	14th century	14 July 1955	TL8244968576; 52°17′06″N 0°40′24″E		1180513	Church of St John Lateran More images
Hengrave Hall	Hengrave	Country House	1538	14 July 1955	TL8239468541; 52°17′05″N 0°40′21″E		1031423	Hengrave Hall More images
Church of All Saints	Honington	Parish Church	14th century	14 July 1955	TL9134274573; 52°20′09″N 0°48′25″E		1182036	Church of All Saints More images
Church of All Saints	Hopton	Parish Church	14th century	14 July 1955	TL9938779039; 52°22′23″N 0°55′39″E		1198789	Church of All Saints More images
Ickworth House	Ickworth	Country House	1829	14 July 1955	TL8161861333; 52°13′13″N 0°39′26″E		1205300	Ickworth House More images
Church of St Mary	Ixworth	Parish Church	15th century	3 February 1950	TL9314070390; 52°17′52″N 0°49′52″E		1180826	Church of St Mary More images
Ixworth Abbey	Ixworth	House	17th century	14 July 1955	TL9298270435; 52°17′53″N 0°49′43″E		1031475	Ixworth Abbey More images
Church of All Saints	Ixworth Thorpe	Church	16th century	14 July 1955	TL9177072499; 52°19′02″N 0°48′44″E		1031461	Church of All Saints More images
Church of St Peter and St Paul	Kedington	Church	15th century	19 December 1961	TL7050247026; 52°05′43″N 0°29′15″E		1376724	Church of St Peter and St Paul More images
Church of All Saints	Little Bradley	Church	Anglo-Saxon origins	19 December 1961	TL6818752122; 52°08′30″N 0°27′23″E		1227173	Church of All Saints More images
Church of St Mary Magdalene	Little Whelnetham	Church	16th century	14 July 1955	TL8886560045; 52°12′23″N 0°45′45″E		1278672	Church of St Mary Magdalene More images
Church of St Peter	Ousden	Church	12th century	19 December 1961	TL7358159590; 52°12′26″N 0°32′20″E		1227383	Church of St Peter More images
Church of St Mary	Pakenham	Parish Church	12th century	14 July 1955	TL9298867063; 52°16′04″N 0°49′37″E		1181353	Church of St Mary More images
Church of St Giles	Risby	Church	14th century	14 July 1955	TL8021966377; 52°15′58″N 0°38′22″E		1031432	Church of St Giles More images
Church of St Mary	Rougham	Parish Church	15th century	14 July 1955	TL9120062596; 52°13′42″N 0°47′53″E		1031163	Church of St Mary More images
Church of St Nicholas	Rushbrooke	Parish Church	16th century	14 July 1955	TL8934161520; 52°13′10″N 0°46′13″E		1377019	Church of St Nicholas More images
Church of St Andrew	Sapiston	Parish Church	12th century	14 July 1955	TL9205074258; 52°19′58″N 0°49′02″E		1031294	Church of St Andrew More images
Church of All Saints	Stansfield	Church	15th century	19 December 1961	TL7833452524; 52°08′32″N 0°36′17″E		1227686	Church of All Saints More images
Purton Green Farmhouse	Stansfield	Hall House	13th century	20 May 1974	TL7825853510; 52°09′04″N 0°36′15″E		1227639	Purton Green Farmhouse More images
Church of St John the Baptist	Stoke-by-Clare	Church	16th century	19 December 1955	TL7410243342; 52°03′40″N 0°32′18″E		1235153	Church of St John the Baptist More images
Church of St Margaret	Stradishall	Church	14th century	19 December 1961	TL7477852570; 52°08′38″N 0°33′10″E		1235703	Church of St Margaret More images
Church of St Nicholas	Little Saxham	Church	14th century	14 July 1955	TL7992663714; 52°14′32″N 0°38′02″E		1285080	Church of St Nicholas More images
Church of St Nicholas	Thelnetham	Parish Church	c. 1300	14 July 1955	TM0186178302; 52°21′56″N 0°57′48″E		1194457	Church of St Nicholas More images
Church of St Mary	Troston	Parish Church	13th century	14 July 1955	TL9003172270; 52°18′56″N 0°47′11″E		1031250	Church of St Mary More images
West Stow Hall	West Stow	Farmhouse	16th century	14 July 1955	TL8159270879; 52°18′22″N 0°39′44″E		1031269	West Stow Hall More images
Church of All Saints	Wickhambrook	Church	14th century	19 December 1961	TL7534654444; 52°09′38″N 0°33′43″E		1264889	Church of All Saints More images
Gifford's Hall	Wickhambrook	Manor House	c. 1490	19 December 1961	TL7708353842; 52°09′16″N 0°35′14″E		1235864	Upload Photo
Church of All Saints	Wordwell	Parish Church	11th century	14 July 1955	TL8280472035; 52°18′58″N 0°40′50″E		1031270	Church of All Saints More images

== See also ==
- List of Grade I listed buildings in Suffolk
