= List of honorary fellows of St Edmund Hall, Oxford =

This is a list of Honorary Fellows of St Edmund Hall, Oxford.

- Samira Ahmed
- Dame Sarah Asplin
- Nicolas Browne-Wilkinson, Baron Browne-Wilkinson
- Sir Stanley Burnton
- Sir Ian Byatt
- Sir David Cooksey
- John Cox
- Kevin Crossley-Holland
- Amelia Fletcher
- Patrick Garland
- David Gauke
- Andrew Graham
- Keith Gull
- Roy Harris
- Elizabeth Hollingworth
- Terry Jones
- Gabriel Josipovici
- Ken Macdonald, Baron Macdonald of River Glaven
- Tony Marchington
- Bill Miller
- Michael Mingos
- Sir Derek Morris
- Michael Nazir-Ali
- Ronald Oxburgh, Baron Oxburgh
- Gareth Roberts
- Sir Michael Rose
- Richard Smethurst
- Sir Keir Starmer
- Sir Douglas Veale
- Cat White
- Sir Denis Wright

== See also ==
- Category:Fellows of St Edmund Hall, Oxford
- Category:Alumni of St Edmund Hall, Oxford
