= The Iron Bridge, Culford Park =

Oldest bridge made of hollow cast iron segments

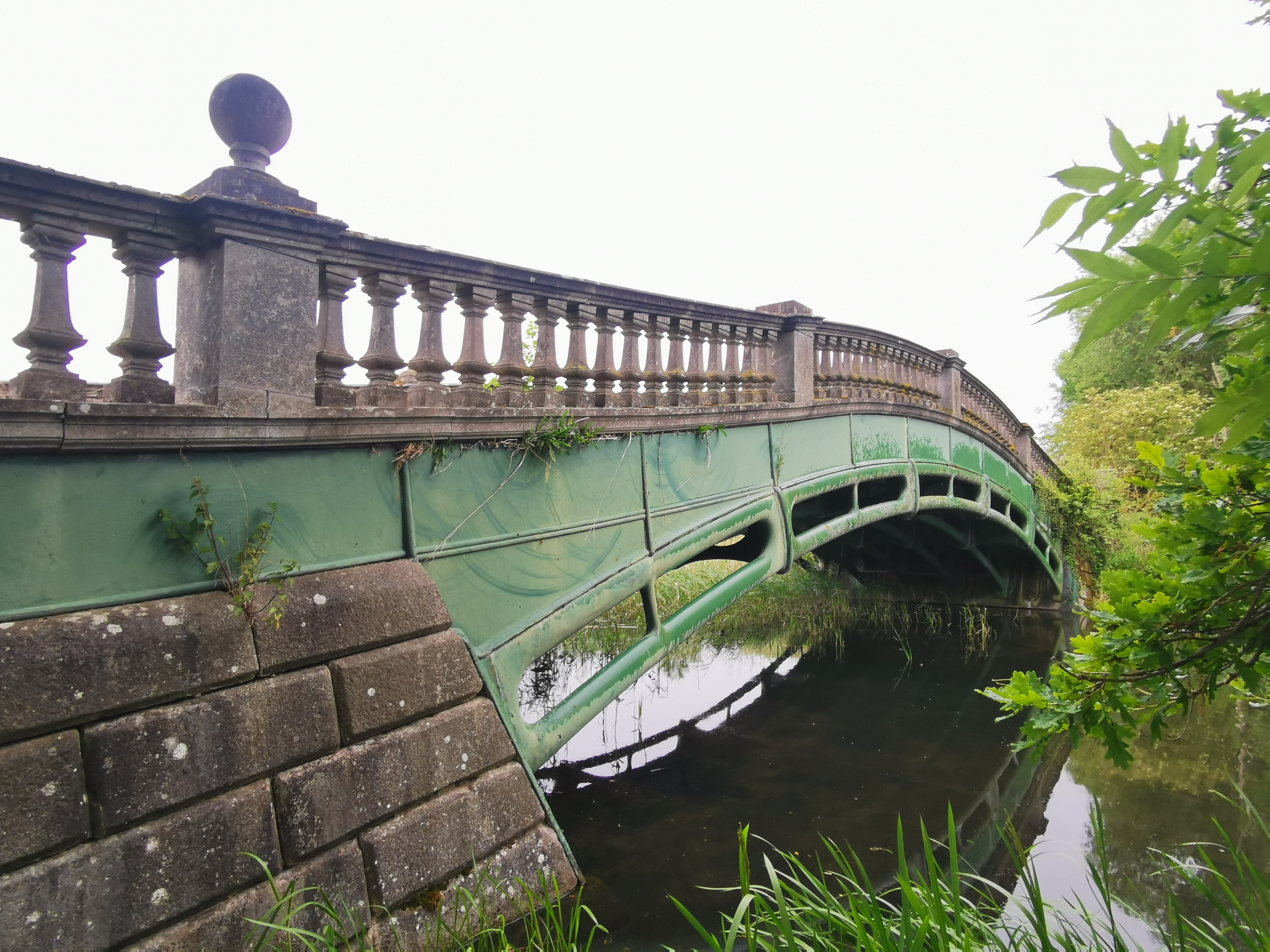
- The Iron Bridge (June 2020)
- Coordinates: 52.301266°N 0.679499°E ,
- OS grid reference: TL888704
- Carries: Pedestrian traffic
- Locale: Culford Park near Bury St Edmunds
- Owner: Culford School

Characteristics
- Design: Single arch bridge
- Material: Cast iron
- Width: 20 ft (6.1 m)
- Longest span: 60 ft (18 m)
- No. of spans: 1
- Piers in water: 0

History
- Designer: Samuel Wyatt
- Fabrication by: William Hawks and Co of Gateshead
- Construction cost: est.£10,000
- Opened: c.1804

Listed Building – Grade I
- Official name: The Iron Bridge at Culford School
- Designated: 15 May 1996
- Reference no.: 1269105

Location
- Interactive map of The Iron Bridge, Culford Park

The Iron Bridge is a grade I listed early cast-iron bridge crossing a tributary of the River Lark in the grounds of Culford Park in the village of Culford near Bury St Edmunds, Suffolk.

The bridge is of exceptional interest as one of the earliest bridges with an unmodified cast-iron structure to survive. Built for Charles Cornwallis, 2nd Marquess Cornwallis, the owner of Culford Park in 1804, it is a unique example of a cast-iron bridge built to the patent of Samuel Wyatt. The rib castings feature oval tubular sections and are the earliest known example with hollow ribs, leading to the structure receiving a grade I listing on 15 May 1996.

The woods to the Southwest of the bridge are known as Iron Bridge Carr.

== Design ==
On 10 June 1800, Samuel Wyatt patented a new design for ...constructing bridges, warehouses, and other buildings without the use of wood... which was published in the Repertory of Arts and Manufactures: Vol.14 in 1801.

The patent describes how to construct a bridge using:

...hollow pieces of cast iron in a longitudinal direction and plates or pipes of the same material, having sockets on them, to receive the ends or shoulders of the said pipes, tubes, or other hollow pieces, placed transversely; and extending from one side of the bridge to the other, so that when the required number of pipes, tubes, or other hollow pieces of cast-iron, and transverse places, or pieces, are put together they form the arch, and so firmly fix, connect, and unite, all the parts, as not to require the aid of screws, bolts, cramps, or any wrought-iron fastenings whatever; but, for the sake of giving the joins a more equal bearing, it will be proper to run lead or cement into them.

The bridge at Culford follows this design with 5 cast-iron voussoirs making up one segment arc, which is repeated six times, forming the 60 ft span connected with socketed joints. Arched plates between the ribs carry the infill up to roadway level with channelled granite abutments on either side. Masonry balustrades line the edge of the bridge, 20 ft wide, with carved marble urns at the ends.

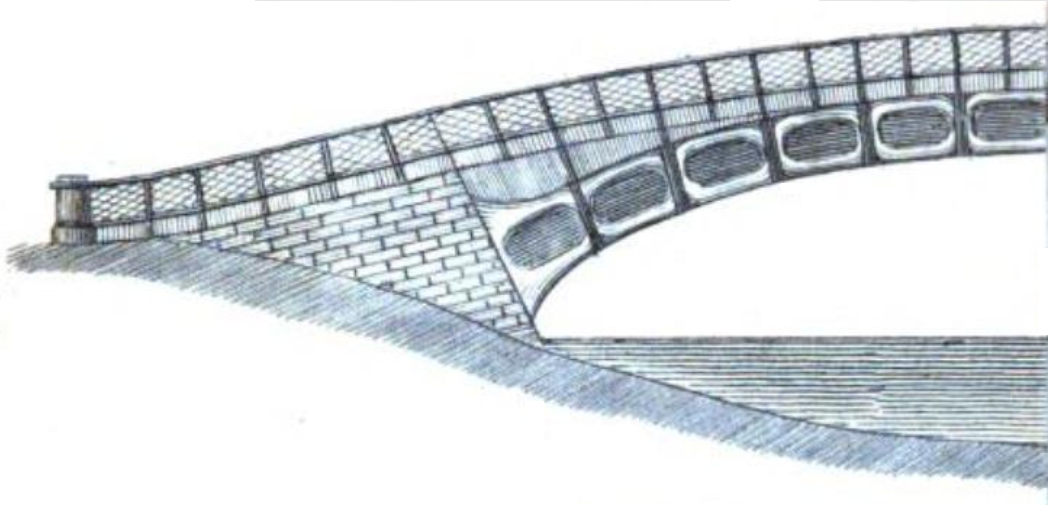
Diagram of an Iron Bridge from Samuel Wyatt patent of 1800

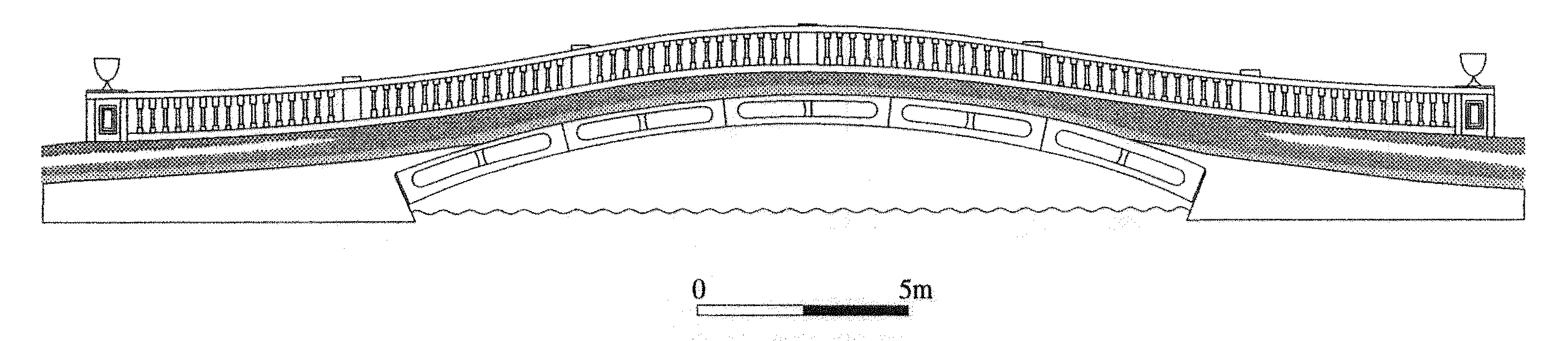
Diagram of the Culford Park bridge as seen from the water

== Construction ==
The metal segments for the bridge were cast in 1804 by William Hawks and Son of Gateshead and weighed 80 tons, along with 2 tons of lead for £1,457. It is estimated that the additional cost of transportation, stonework, and construction gave a total of £10,000 for the installation of the bridge, approximately £1 million in 2019 prices.

Samuel Wyatt's brother James was appointed in the 1790s to make modifications to Culford Hall, which drew heavily on Samuel's work at Shugborough Hall, so it is likely that Samuel's bridge design was introduced at this point.

The infill of the bridge between the deck and road surface was examined in 1998 and was found to be made up of a single layer of yellow bricks, 15 cm of chalk, 40 cm of hoggin, finished with 5 cm of topsoil with a slightly different composition at the abutments. It is believed that this material dates from the original construction.

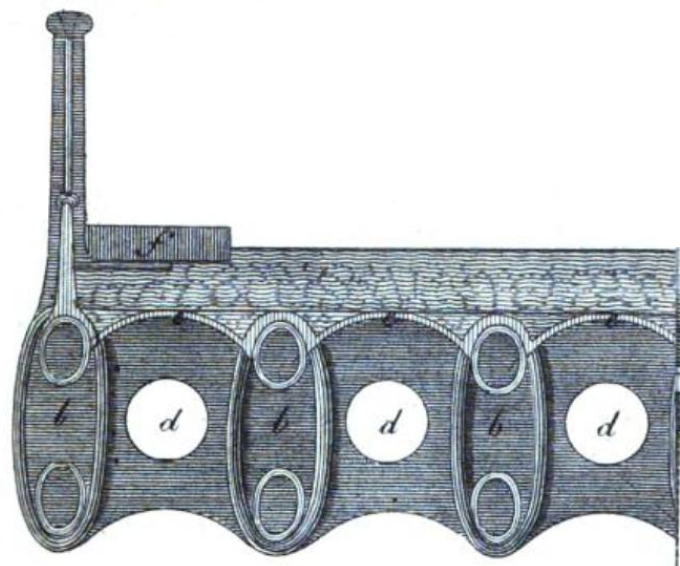
Cross section of Samuel Wyatt's Iron Bridge design of 1800

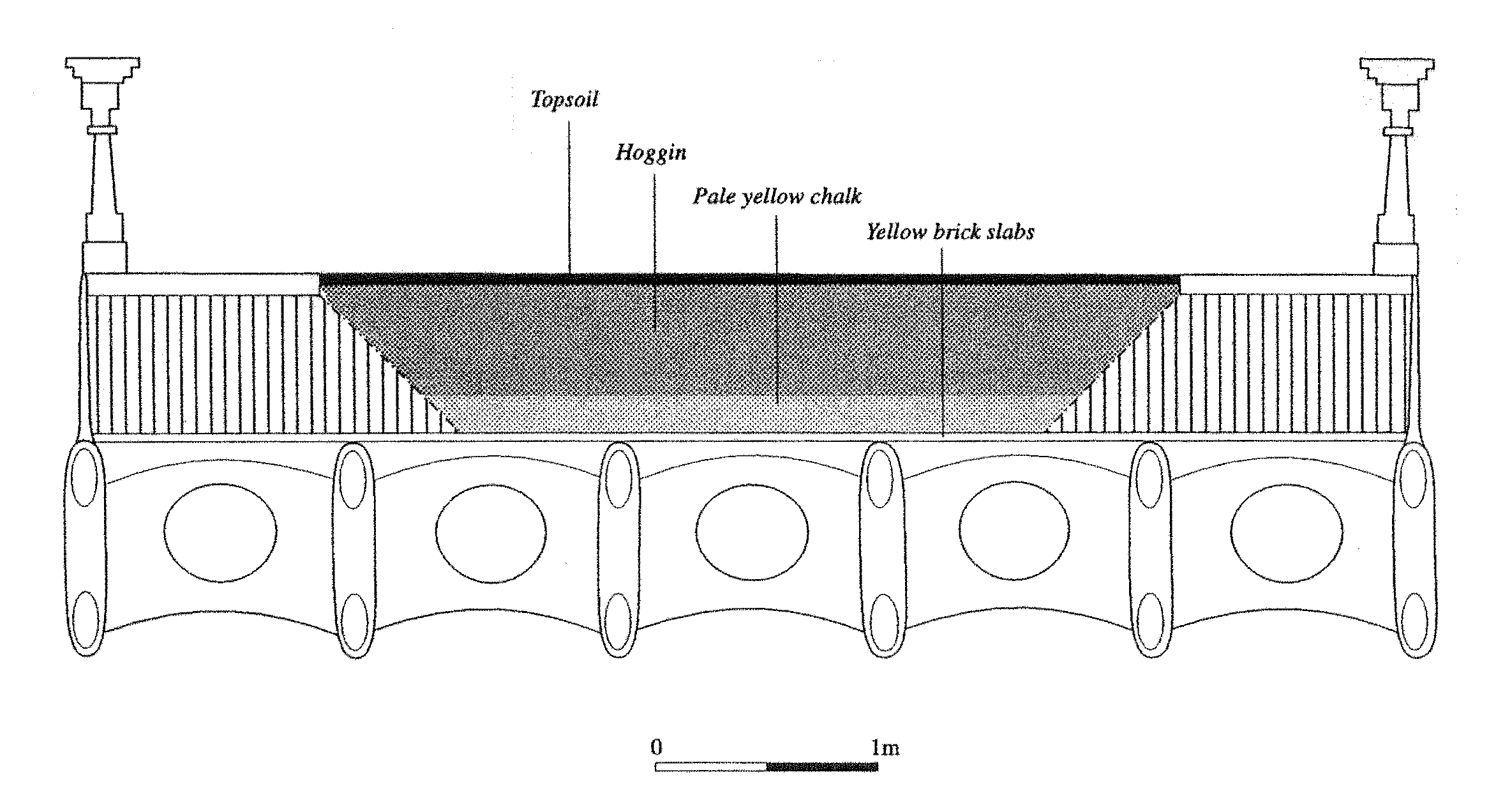
Cross-section of the bridge showing the structure and infill uncovered during maintenance work in 1998.

== Gallery ==
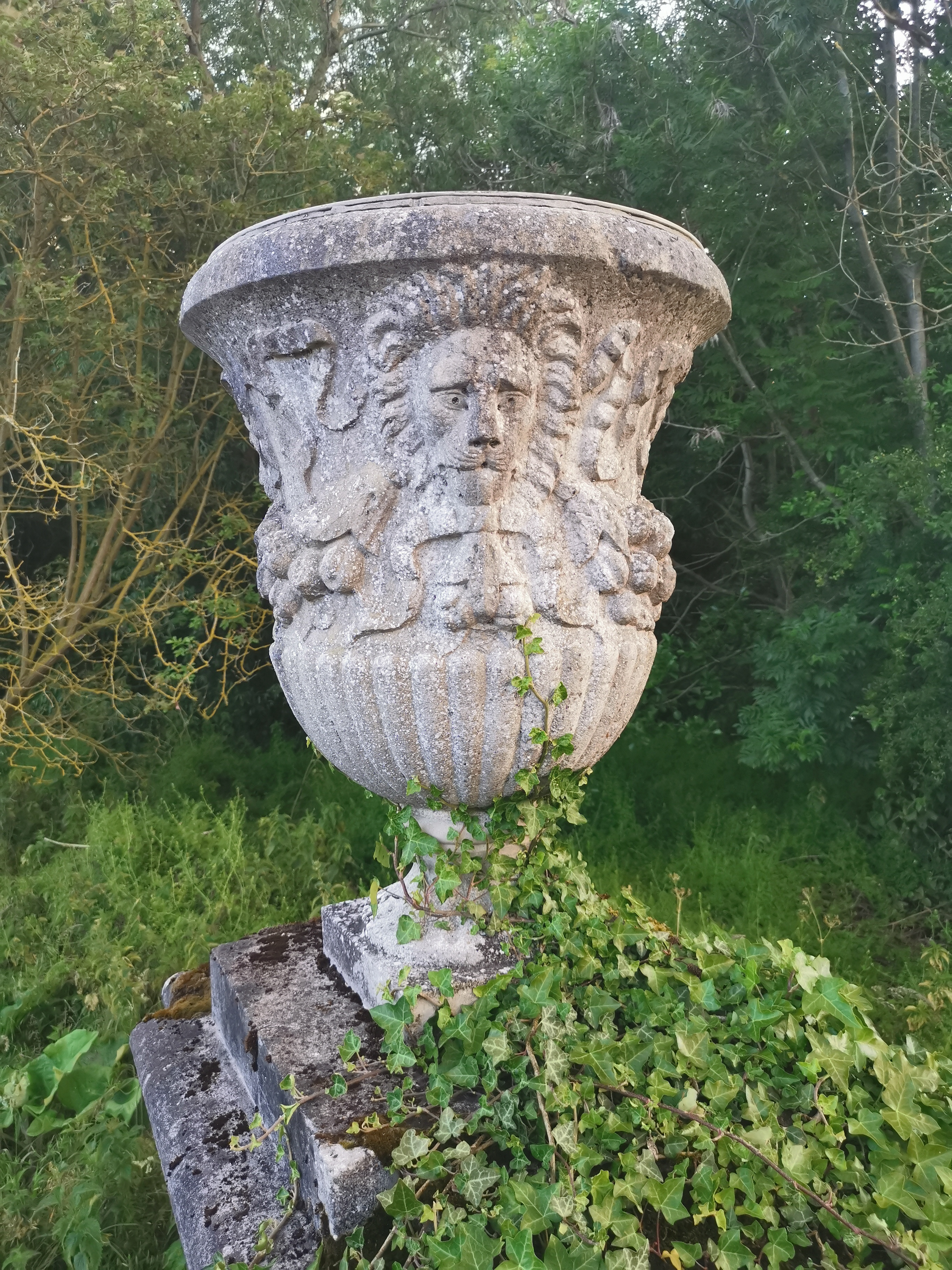
Marble urn

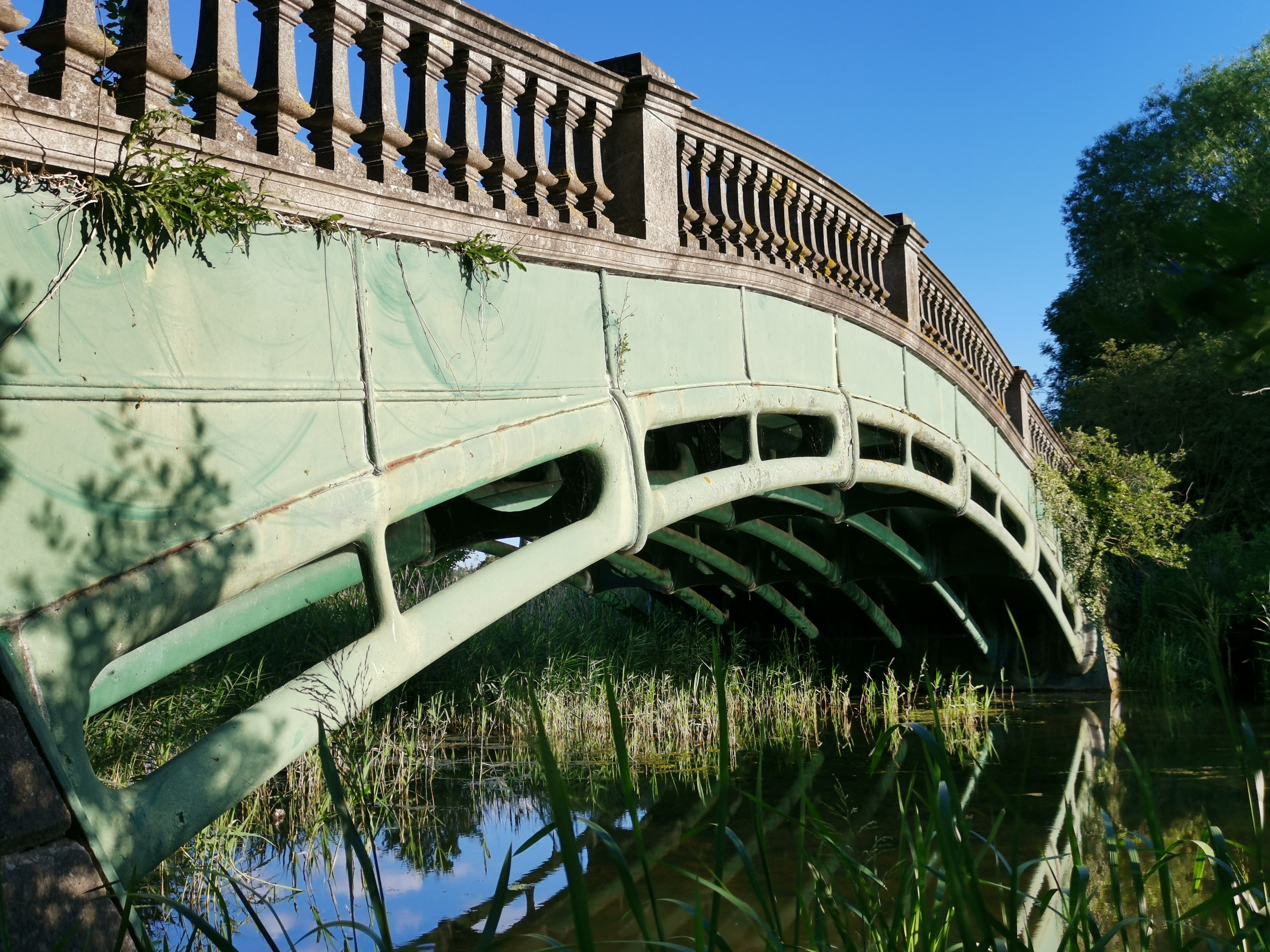
The bridge today

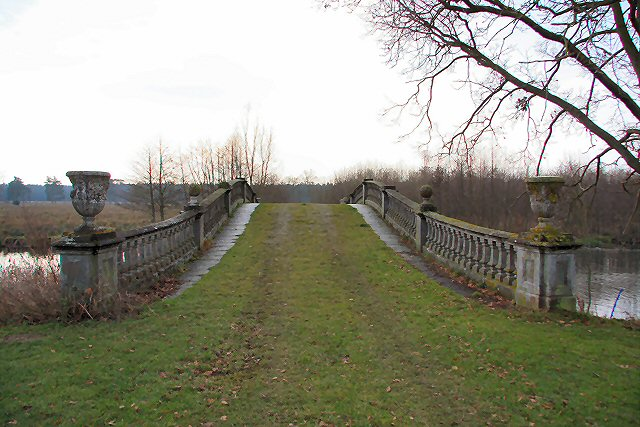
The approach to the bridge
