= Paula Pryke =

British florist and author (born 1960)

Paula Shane Pryke
- Born: 29 April 1960 (age 65); United Kingdom
- Spouse: Peter Romaniuk (1987–present)

Paula Shane Pryke OBE (born 29 April 1960) is a British florist and author.

== Family and education ==
Pryke was educated at Culford School (1970–1978), followed by Trinity and All Saints College (then affiliated with the University of Leeds), where she studied history Pryke also earned a licentiate from the Royal Academy of Music in 1985.

== Career ==
After starting a career as a history teacher, Pryke became training as a florist with the Constance Spry Flower School in 1987. The following year, she founded Paula Pryke Flowers in Islington, London. She went on to open nine additional flower shops in the United Kingdom as well as the Paula Pryke Flower School in 1994. In 2000, Pryke received the Ambassador for Floral Industry Award, NFU. In 2012, she was selected as a judge for the 2012 Rose Parade.

Pryke was appointed Officer of the Order of the British Empire (OBE) in the 2014 Birthday Honours for services to the floral design industry.^{[1]}

She lectures on and exhibits floral art worldwide.

== Works ==
- Pryke, Paula (1993). The New Floral Artist. Mitchell Beazley. ISBN 978-1-85732-818-9.
- Pryke, Paula (1995). Flower Innovations. Mitchell Beazley. ISBN 978-1-84000-110-5.
- Pryke, Paula (1995). Flower Celebrations. Mitchell Beazley. ISBN 978-1-85732-716-8.
- Pryke, Paula (1999). Simple Flowers. Ryland, Peters & Small. ISBN 978-1-84597-234-9.
- Pryke, Paula (1999). Candles. Ryland, Peters & Small. ISBN 978-1-84172-607-6.
- Pryke, Paula (1999). Wreaths and Garlands. Ryland, Peters & Small. ISBN 978-1-84172-723-3.
- Pryke, Paula (2001). Living Colour. Jacqui Small LLP. ISBN 978-1-903221-06-8.
- Pryke, Paula (2004). Wedding Flowers. Jacqui Small LLP. ISBN 978-1-903221-18-1.
- Pryke, Paula (2004). Classic Paula Pryke. Mitchell Beazley. ISBN 978-1-84000-920-0.
- Pryke, Paula (2006). Flower School. Jacqui Small LLP. ISBN 978-1-903221-37-2.
- Pryke, Paula (2007). Table Flowers. Jacqui Small LLP. ISBN 978-1-903221-80-8.
- Pryke, Paula (2009). Simply Pink. Jacqui Small LLP. ISBN 978-1-906417-21-5.
- Pryke, Paula (2010). The Ultimate Floral Collection. Jacqui Small LLP. ISBN 978-1-906417-38-3.
