= The King's Pleasure =

1969 novel by Norah Lofts

- Author: Norah Lofts
- Language: English
- Publication date: 1969

The King's Pleasure is a 1969 historical fiction novel by Norah Lofts.

== Plot summary ==
The book follows Catherine of Aragon as her marriage is broken up by her husband King Henry VIII's affair with Anne Boleyn.

== Reception ==
The book was praised by critics for its prose, sympathetic portrayal of its characters, and historical accuracy. It was re-issued in 2008.
