= Silver Nutmeg =

1947 British novel by Norah Lofts

- Author: Norah Lofts
- Language: English
- Publisher: Michael Joseph
- Publication date: 1947
- Publication place: England
- Media type: Print (hardcover)
- Pages: 368

Silver Nutmeg is a 1947 historical romance novel by Norah Lofts. It depicts colonial activities in the Dutch East Indies during the 17th century.

== Plot ==
The novel follows Annabet Van Goens, the daughter of a wealthy Dutch landowner who is forced into a "glove marriage" with colonial planter Evert Haan. Arriving in Dutch Indonesia, the sickly Annabet regains her health and becomes romantically entangled with a handsome Englishman.

== Publication History ==
Silver Nutmeg was first published in hardcover in the UK and Australia by Michael Joseph, in the United States by Doubleday, and in Canada by Ryerson Press. It is listed in the Irish Censorship Board's Register of Prohibited Publications.

The novel was published in the fall of 1947, around the time of Operation Product during which Dutch military action in Indonesia caused an international outcry and proved to be a major turning point in the Indonesian National Revolution. As such, many reviews saw fit to mention the timeliness of Silver Nutmeg's publication. In a positive review for the Fort Worth Star-Telegram, Amos Melton predicted that the novel "would have some political significance in light of the current revolt of the Indonesians against the Dutch." F.W. Russell Smith likewise wrote that the novel was "of special interest today, when a native revolt like that in the novel has set up the Indonesian Republic." For her review in The Atlantic, Phoebe Lou Adams wrote that, while "the world of which Mrs. Lofts writes may be long ago and far away, but the pattern of events against which her seventeenth-century Dutch planters move is familiar enough."

The novel was reissued several times as a mass market paperback, including editions by Doubleday in 1953 (PermaBook P193), by Pyramid in 1967 (T-1715) and 1972, and by Fawcett in 1981 (4431-8).

== Reception ==
Silver Nutmeg received positive reviews, with many commenters praising Lofts' ability to make the character's adventures and emotions relatable to modern readers. A reviewer for the Saskatoon Star-Phoenix commended the "brazenly romantic" work: "Fundamental issues of the time, between empire and empire, black and white, men and men and men and women, are presented not only as issues of that time, but as issues of all times." The Sydney Daily Telegraph offered a particularly effusive review:

"The time may be the mid-eighteenth century; the place may be the Dutch East Indies; the scent of nutmeg, tropical vegetation and rank native bodies my give it an outlandish flavor, but-- the characters are as real and tangible as any you'd meet in the most honest and well-done realistic novel of today, the personal drama just as intense. And, on top of these things the story is told with a fine sense of restraint and a notable instinct for suspense and final tragedy."

F.W. Russell Smith called the novel "somewhat melodramatic in its plot" but "skillfully and convincingly told." Amos Melton called it "a rattling good tale" and Lofts' best novel to dat. Writing for the Norfolk Ledger-Star, Clarence Walton called it "a stirring tale and one with a firm historical background." Claire Keefer of the Ottawa Journal wrote that Silver Nutmeg is "rich in romantic and dramatic interest" and that it "possesses all the enchantment suggested by the lovely title." Ruth Campbell, reviewer for The Tennessean , wrote that Silver Nutmeg "holds all the excitement that can be crammed into a novel" and posted that it would reward re-readings and "would make a perfectly swell movie."
