= Norah Lofts =

British writer (1904–1983)

- Born: Norah Ethel Robinson; 27 August 1904; Shipdham, Norfolk, England
- Died: 10 September 1983 (aged 79); Bury St Edmunds, Suffolk, England
- Other names: Peter Curtis; Juliet Astley
- Occupations: Writer, novelist
- Years active: 1936-1983
- Spouse(s): Geoffrey Lofts (m. 1933; died 1948) Robert Jorisch (m. 1949)
- Children: 1

Norah Ethel Lofts (née Robinson; 27 August 1904 – 10 September 1983) was a 20th-century British writer. She also wrote under the pen names Peter Curtis and Juliet Astley. She wrote more than fifty books. Although specializing in historical fiction and "known for her effective use of English history" in her work, she also wrote some mysteries, short stories and non-fiction. Many of her novels, including her Suffolk Trilogy, follow the history of specific houses and their residents over several generations.

== Personal life ==
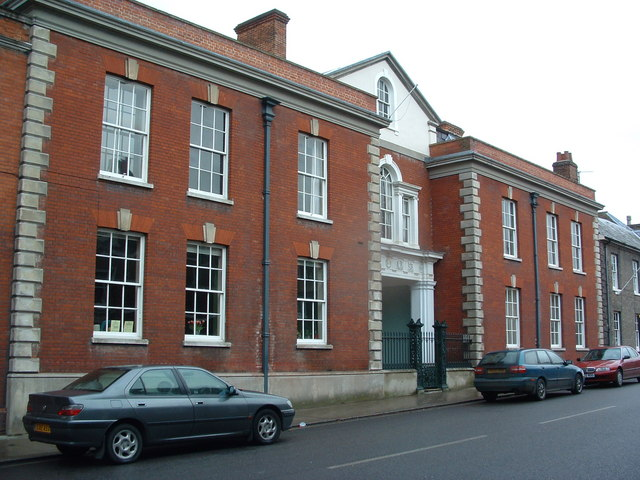
Northgate House, Bury St Edmunds, home to Lofts from 1955 until her death in 1983

Norah Ethel Robinson was born in Shipdham, Norfolk to Isaac Robinson and Ethel Garner, and grew up in Bury St Edmunds where she was educated at Guildhall Feoffment Girls School and the County Grammar School for Girls in the town. In 1925 she attained a teaching diploma from Norwich Training College.

She married Geoffrey Lofts in 1933 with whom she had one son, Clive. Geoffrey died in 1948. Lofts wed her second husband, Robert Jorisch, a technical consultant to the British Sugar Corporation at the town's sugar beet factory, in 1949. She stood as a Town Councillor for Bury St Edmunds from 1957 to 1962, where she died in 1983.

== Work ==
Lofts chose to release her murder-mystery novels under the pen name Peter Curtis because she did not want the readers of her historic fiction to pick up a murder-mystery novel and expect classic Lofts historical fiction. However, the murders still show characteristic Lofts elements. Most of her historical novels fall into two general categories: biographical novels about queens, among them Anne Boleyn, Isabella I of Castile, and Catherine of Aragon; and novels set in East Anglia centered around the fictitious town of Baildon (patterned largely on Bury St. Edmunds). Her creation of this fictitious area of England is reminiscent of Thomas Hardy's creation of "Wessex"; and her use of recurring characters such that the protagonist of one novel appears as a secondary character in others is even more reminiscent of William Faulkner's work set in "Yoknapatawpha County," Mississippi. Lofts' work set in East Anglia in the 1930s and 1940s shows great concern with the very poor in society and their inability to change their conditions. Her approach suggests an interest in the social reform that became a feature of British post-war society.

She was not afraid to tackle potentially sensitive subjects; her version of the nativity of Jesus, with backstories of Mary, Joseph, the Magi, the shepherds - even the innkeeper - is rendered in How Far to Bethlehem? as is the ill-fated Donner Party expedition in Road to Revelation (aka Winter Harvest).

Several of her novels were turned into films. Jassy was filmed as Jassy (1947) starring Margaret Lockwood and Dennis Price. You're Best Alone was filmed as Guilt Is My Shadow (1950). The Devil's Own (also known as The Little Wax Doll) was filmed as The Witches (1966). The film 7 Women (1966) was directed by John Ford and loosely based on her story "Chinese Finale".

== Honours ==
In the United States, she won a National Book Award for I Met a Gypsy, voted by members of the American Booksellers Association. Specifically, her collection was "the 'forgotten book' of the year (1936) that least deserved to be forgotten" (subsequently termed the Bookseller Discovery). Alfred Knopf represented her at the ceremony.

== Bibliography ==
=== Novels ===
- Here Was a Man: A Romantic History of Sir Walter Raleigh, London: Methuen; New York: Knopf, 1936; reprinted, Hodder & Stoughton, 1976.
- White Hell of Pity, London: Methuen; New York: Knopf, 1937; reprinted, Manor, 1975.
- Out of This Nettle, London: Gollancz, 1938; published as Colin Lowrie, New York: Knopf, 1939; rep. under original title, Manor, 1976.
- Requiem for Idols, London : Methuen; New York: Knopf, 1938; reprinted, Corgi Books, 1972.
- Blossom Like the Rose, London: Gollancz; New York: Knopf, 1939; reprinted, Manor, 1976.
- Hester Roon, London: Davies; New York: Knopf, 1940; reprinted, Corgi Books, 1978.
- The Road to Revelation, London: Davies, 1941; reprinted, Corgi Books, 1976; reprinted as Winter Harvest, New York: Doubleday, 1955; reprinted, Fawcett, 1976.
- The Brittle Glass, London: Michael Joseph, 1942; New York: Knopf, 1943; reprinted, Fawcett, 1977.
- Michael and All Angels, London: Michael Joseph, 1943; published as The Golden Fleece, New York: Knopf, 1944; reprinted, Fawcett, 1977.
- Jassy, London: Michael Joseph; New York: Knopf, 1944; reprinted Fawcett, 1979; re-published in paperback and Kindle-format ebook, Tree of Life Publishing, 2009.
- To See a Fine Lady, London: Michael Joseph; New York: Knopf, 1946; reprinted, Fawcett, 1976.
- Silver Nutmeg, London: Michael Joseph; New York: Doubleday, 1947; reprinted, Corgi Books, 1974.
- A Calf for Venus, London: Michael Joseph; New York: Doubleday, 1949; published as Letty, Pyramid Publications, 1968; reprinted under original title, Corgi Books, 1974.
- Esther, New York: Macmillan, 1950; reprinted Corgi Books, 1973; re-published in paperback and Kindle-format ebook, Tree of Life Publishing, 2007.
- The Lute Player, London: Michael Joseph; New York: Doubleday, 1951; reprinted, Fawcett, 1976.
- Bless This House, London: Michael Joseph; New York: Doubleday, 1954 (as Literary Guild selection); reprinted, Queens House, 1977; re-published in paperback and Kindle-format ebook, Tree of Life Publishing, 2011.
- Queen in Waiting, London: Joseph, 1955; New York: 1958; as Eleanor the Queen: The Story of the Most Famous Woman of the Middle Ages, New York: Doubleday, 1955; reprinted under original title, Fawcett, 1977.
- Afternoon of an Autocrat, London: Michael Joseph; New York: Doubleday, 1956; published as The Deadly Gift, Pyramid Publications, 1967; published as The Devil in Clevely, London: Morley Baker, 1968; published under original title, Hodder & Stoughton, 1978; re-published, paperback and Kindle-format ebook as The Devil in Clevely, Tree of Life Publishing, 2012.
- Scent of Cloves, New York: Doubleday, 1957; reprinted, Queens House, 1977; re-published, paperback and Kindle-format ebook, Tree of Life Publishing, 2013.
- The House Trilogy:
  - The Town House, London: Hutchinson; New York: Doubleday, 1959; reprinted, Fawcett, 1976.
  - The House at Old Vine, London: Hutchinson; New York: Doubleday, 1961; reprinted, Queens House, 1977.
  - The House at Sunset, New York: Doubleday, 1962; London: Hutchinson, 1963; reprinted, Fawcett, 1978.
- The Concubine: A Novel Based Upon the Life of Anne Boleyn, New York: Doubleday, 1963; London: Hutchinson, 1964; published as Concubine, London: Arrow Books, 1965.
- How Far to Bethlehem? London: Hutchinson; New York: Doubleday, 1965; re-published, paperback and Kindle-format ebook, Tree of Life Publishing, 2007.
- The Lost Ones, London: Hutchinson, 1969; as The Lost Queen, New York: Doubleday, 1969.
- Madselin, London: Corgi Books, 1969; New York: Bantam, 1970.
- The King's Pleasure: A Novel of Katharine of Aragon, New York: Doubleday, 1969; London: Hodder & Stoughton, 1970.
- Lovers All Untrue, London: Hodder & Stoughton; New York: Doubleday, 1970.
- A Rose for Virtue: The Very Private Life of Hortense, London: Hodder & Stoughton; New York: Doubleday, 1971.
- Charlotte, London: Hodder & Stoughton, 1972; published as Out of the Dark, New York: Doubleday, 1972.
- The Maude Reed Tale, New York: Dell, 1972.
- Uneasy Paradise 1973; published as Her Own Special Island, London: Transworld Publishers, 1975.
- Nethergate, London: Hodder & Stoughton; New York: Doubleday, 1973.
- Crown of Aloes, London: Hodder & Stoughton; New York: Doubleday, 1974.
- Checkmate, London: Corgi Books, 1975; New York: Fawcett, 1978.
- Walk into My Parlour, London: Corgi Books, 1975.
- The Suffolk Trilogy:
  - Knight's Acre London: Hodder & Stoughton, 1974; New York: Doubleday, 1975.
  - The Homecoming, London: Hodder & Stoughton, 1975; New York: Doubleday, 1976.
  - The Lonely Furrow, London: Hodder & Stoughton, 1976; New York: Doubleday, 1977.
- Gad's Hall, London: Hodder & Stoughton, 1977; New York: Doubleday, 1978.
- Haunted House, London: Hodder & Stoughton, 1978; published as The Haunting of Gad's Hall, New York: Doubleday, 1979.
- The Day of the Butterfly, London: Bodley Head, 1979; New York: Doubleday, 1980.
- A Wayside Tavern, London: Hodder & Stoughton; New York: Doubleday, 1980.
- The Claw, London: Hodder & Stoughton, 1981; New York: Doubleday, 1982.
- The Old Priory, London: Bodley Head, 1981; New York: Doubleday, 1982.
- Pargeters, London: Hodder & Stoughton, 1984; New York: Doubleday, 1986.

=== Short story collections ===
- I Met a Gypsy, London: Methuen & New York: Knopf, 1935.
- Heaven in Your Hand and Other Stories, New York: Doubleday, 1958; London: Michael Joseph, 1959; reprinted, Fawcett, 1975.
- Is There Anybody There? London: Corgi Books, 1974; published as Hauntings: Is There Anybody There?, New York: Doubleday, 1975.
- Saving Face and Other Stories, London: Hodder & Stoughton, 1983; New York: Doubleday, 1984.

=== Other publications ===
- Women in the Old Testament: Twenty Psychological Portraits, London: Sampson Low & New York: Macmillan, 1949.
- Eternal France: A History of France, 1789-1944, with Margery Weiner, New York: Doubleday, 1968; London: Hodder & Stoughton, 1969.
- The Story of Maude Reed (for children), London: Transworld, 1971; published as The Maude Reed Tale, New York: Nelson, 1972.
- Rupert Hatton's Tale (for children), London: Carousel Books, 1972; published as Rupert Hatton's Story, New York: Nelson, 1973 (Junior Literary Guild selection).
- Domestic Life in England, London: Weidenfeld & Nicolson, 1976; New York: Doubleday, 1977.
- Queens of Britain, London: Hodder & Stoughton, 1977; published as Queens of England, New York: Doubleday, 1977.
- Emma Hamilton, London: Michael Joseph & New York: Coward McCann, 1978.
- Anne Boleyn, London: Orbis & New York: Coward McCann, 1979.

=== Novels published under the pseudonym Juliet Astley ===
- The Fall of Midas, New York: Coward McCann, 1975; London: Michael Joseph, 1976.
- Copsi Castle, London: Michael Joseph & New York: Coward McCann, 1978.

=== Novels published under the pseudonym Peter Curtis ===
- Dead March in Three Keys, London: Davis, 1940; published as No Question of Murder, New York: Doubleday, 1959; published as Bride of Moat House, by Norah Lofts, New York: Fawcett, 1975.
- You're Best Alone, London: Macdonald, 1943, reprinted, Corgi Books, 1971; published with Requiem for Idols, in Two by Norah Lofts, New York: Doubleday, 1981.
- Lady Living Alone, London: Macdonald, 1945.
- The Devil's Own, London: Macdonald & New York: Doubleday, 1960; published as The Witches, London: Pan Books, 1966; published as The Little Wax Doll, New York: Doubleday, 1970.
