= Market Cross, Bury St Edmunds =

Municipal building in Bury St Edmunds, Suffolk, England

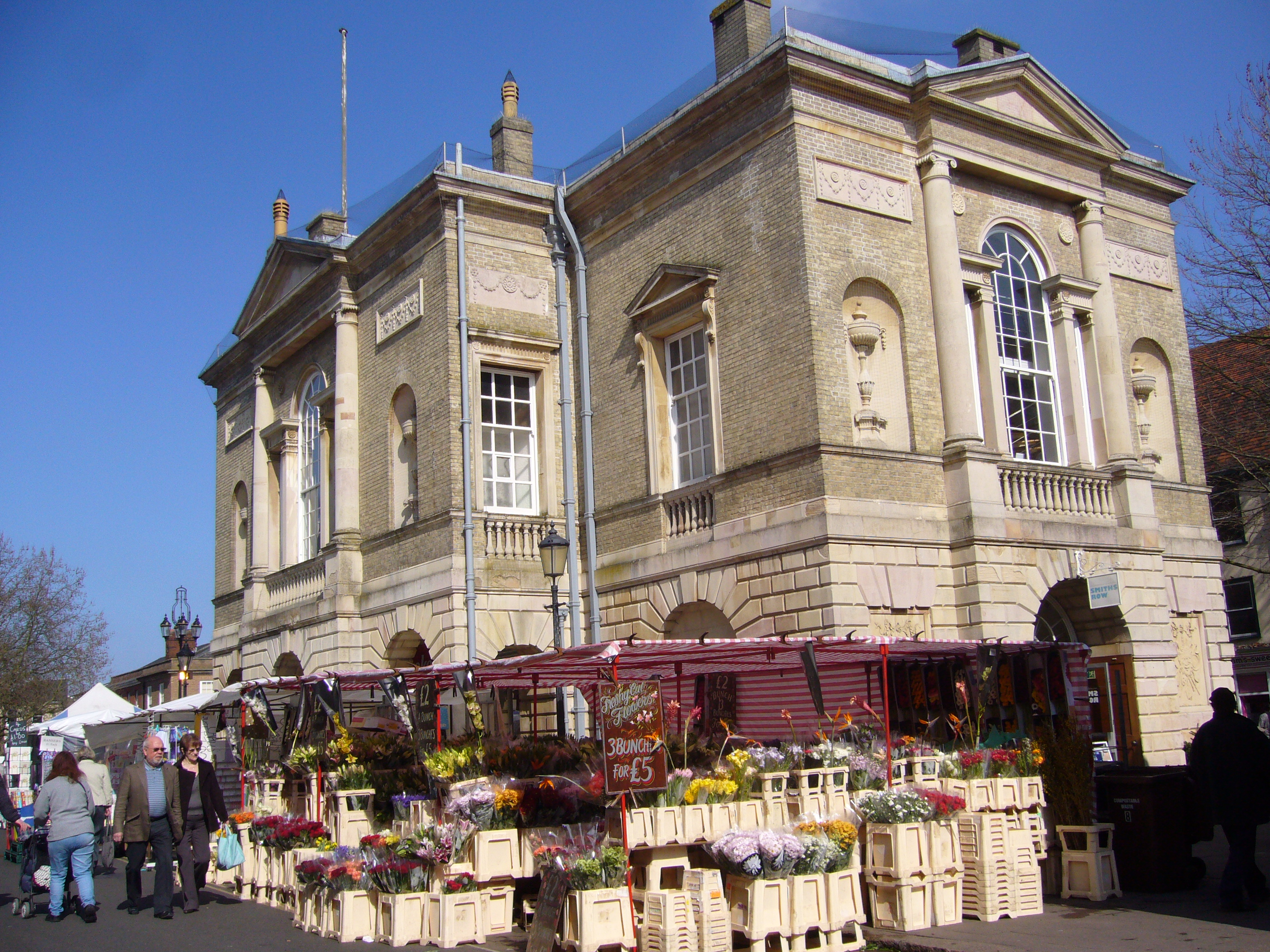
- Market Cross, Bury St Edmunds

- Shown in Suffolk
- 52.2458°N 0.7121°E
- Location: Cornhill, Bury St Edmunds

History
- Built: 1780

Site notes
- Architect: Robert Adam
- Architectural style: Neoclassical style

Listed Building – Grade I
- Official name: Market Cross
- Designated: 7 August 1952
- Reference no.: 1076930

The Market Cross, also known as Bury St Edmunds Town Hall, is a municipal building in Cornhill in Bury St Edmunds, Suffolk, England. The building, which is currently used as a community space, is a Grade I listed building.

== History ==
The site of the current building was originally occupied by a simple market cross in the form of a high cross. It was dismantled and replaced by a timber structure which was commissioned by the Bury St Edmunds Guildhall feoffees and completed in 1584. It accommodated an open corn market on the ground floor, and a clothiers' hall on the first floor. It was destroyed in a great fire which broke out in Eastman Street in 1608 but was rebuilt in 1620. It was described as a "very fayer large house for corn sellers wherein they may stand in their great ease very comodiouslye in the heat of somer and also in the tyme of reyne and cold wet winter".

In 1734, the building was converted for use as a theatre which became known as "The Grand Theatre". In The Grubstreet Journal of 19 September 1734, it was written "Our workmen are very near drawing to a conclusion the finishing The Grand Theatre, which has been so long fitting up here, for his Grace the Duke of Grafton's Company of Comedians, and when the paintings and everything are completed, it is believed it will equal (if not exceed) any in England, and none can be supposed to come near it for situation; the company are to come from the University of Cambridge, to open at the beginning of our next fair."

In the early 1770s, civic officials decided that the Market Cross should be rebuilt. The new structure was designed by Robert Adam in the neoclassical style, built in ashlar stone and was completed in 1780. It was laid out to a cruciform plan. The ground floor was rusticated with round headed openings on all four elevations, and, on the first floor there were Venetian windows flanked by Ionic order columns supporting friezes and pediments on all four elevations. The windows were flanked by niches containing Etruscan style ornaments and, above the niches, there were panels containing swags and paterae. Internally, the principal room was the assembly hall on the first floor.

The theatre continued to prosper, especially during the Napoleonic Wars, and included productions such as William Shakespeare's tragedy King Lear. However, it ceased to operate when the new Theatre Royal, designed by William Wilkins, opened in Westgate Street in 1819. At that time the assembly room on the first floor of the Market Cross was re-purposed as a concert hall. The building became the meeting place of Bury St Edmunds Borough Council in 1840 and served as "Bury St Edmunds Town Hall" until the new borough offices on Angel Hill, designed by Basil Oliver and William Henry Mitchell, opened in April 1937.

In 1972, the building became an art gallery hosting a programme of changing contemporary art and craft exhibitions and events by British and international artists. However, after getting into financial difficulty, the gallery, which was latterly known as "Smiths Row", closed in November 2015. After six years of standing vacant, it re-opened as a community space in May 2021.

== See also ==
- Grade I listed buildings in St Edmundsbury
