= Jayne-Anne Gadhia =

British businesswoman (born 1961)

Dame Jayne-Anne Gadhia DBE CVO FRSE
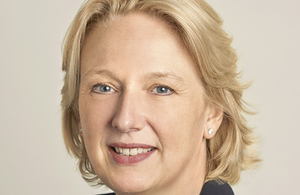
- Born: 19 October 1961 (age 64); Stourbridge
- Education: Culford School
- Alma mater: Royal Holloway, University of London
- Known for: CEO of Virgin Money UK; Founder of Snoop

Dame Jayne-Anne Gadhia, DBE, CVO, FRSE (born 19 October 1961) is a British businesswoman. She is the Founder and Executive Chair of the fintech Snoop. She was the CEO of Virgin Money from 2007 to 2018.

== Early life ==
Gadhia was born in Stourbridge, Worcestershire (now West Midlands), and educated at Culford School, Bury St Edmunds, followed by Royal Holloway, University of London where she graduated with a BA in History.

== Career ==
From 1982, Gadhia trained in accountancy with Ernst & Young. After becoming a Chartered Accountant, she spent six years at Norwich Union (now Aviva) before becoming one of the founders of Virgin Direct in 1995. Three years later, she set up the Virgin One account, which was acquired by The Royal Bank of Scotland in 2001. After five years at RBS she returned to Virgin as CEO of Virgin Money in 2007 until its sale in 2018.

== Advocacy ==
Gadhia is an advocate for gender diversity in business. She has also been open about her experiences of depression, and believes that better work-life balance can improve work performance.

== Honours and awards ==
In 2018 Gadhia was named Leader of the Year at the Lloyds Bank National Business Awards. She was also elected a Fellow of the Royal Society of Edinburgh (FRSE).

She was appointed Commander of the Order of the British Empire (CBE) in the 2014 New Year Honours and Dame Commander of the Order of the British Empire (DBE) in the 2019 New Year Honours. She was appointed Commander of the Royal Victorian Order (CVO) in the 2022 Birthday Honours for services to the Prince's Foundation.

== Personal life ==
Gadhia is married with one daughter.
