= Culford School =

Public school in Bury St Edmunds, Suffolk, England

Coordinates: 52°18′3.94″N 0°41′7.61″E

- Bury St Edmunds, Suffolk, IP28 6TX; England

Information
- Type: Private boarding and day school Public school
- Motto: Viriliter Agite Estote Fortes (Quit Ye Like Men, Be Strong)
- Religious affiliation: Methodist
- Established: 1881
- Founder: J.H.L. Christien
- Local authority: Suffolk
- Department for Education URN: 124886 Tables
- Chair of Governors: Mark Donougher
- Head: Claire Bentley
- Staff: 300
- Gender: Co-educational
- Age: 1 to 18
- Enrolment: 750
- Colour
- Publication: The Culfordian
- Former pupils: Old Culfordians
- Website: http://www.culford.co.uk

Culford School, formerly the East Anglian School for Boys, is a co-educational private boarding and day school in the English public school tradition for pupils age 1–18 in the village of Culford, 4 miles (6 km) north of Bury St Edmunds in Suffolk, England. The head is traditionally a member of the Headmasters' and Headmistresses' Conference and the Prep School head is a member of the IAPS.

== History ==
The school was founded as the East Anglian School for Boys in 1881, incorporating an institution founded in 1873 by Congregationalist minister, Dr John H. L. Christien. It was one of a group of Methodist schools established in response to the growth of the middle class, the launching of the Woodard Schools and the 1867 Taunton Commission, which fuelled an expansion of secondary education in general and of non-conformist boarding schools in particular. The original school was in Northgate Street in Bury St Edmunds, but in 1886 it moved to Thingoe Hill in the town (a site later occupied by the East Anglian School for Girls).

In 1935 the school moved to Culford Park. This is the former seat of the Earls Cornwallis, then the Benyon family and finally the Earls of Cadogan. The 7th Earl Cadogan sold the estate to the Methodist Independent Schools Trust in 1935, and thereafter the school became known as Culford School. It is at the centre of East Anglia, c.90 minutes from London, 60 from Norwich, 40 from Ipswich, and c.30 minutes from Cambridge.

The school sits in 480 acres (1.9 km^{2}) of Repton parkland with grazing, formal gardens, lake, and the 16th-19th-century Culford Hall. When the school first moved to Culford the Hall became dormitories and classrooms; the laundry the sanatorium; the forge the art and woodwork studios (now the Pringle Centre for Art and Design Technology); and the stables the Junior Department (now the Preparatory School).

The first new building to be added by the school was Cadogan House, for junior boys, in 1937. The Leigh Memorial Swimming Pool was built in the same year.

The school was one of the 'direct grant grammar schools' in the system that existed in England and Wales between 1945 and 1976. The system provided funds from central government for a number of pupils per year to be admitted from local education authority schools within the County of West Suffolk, selected primarily on the basis of their Eleven-plus exam results.

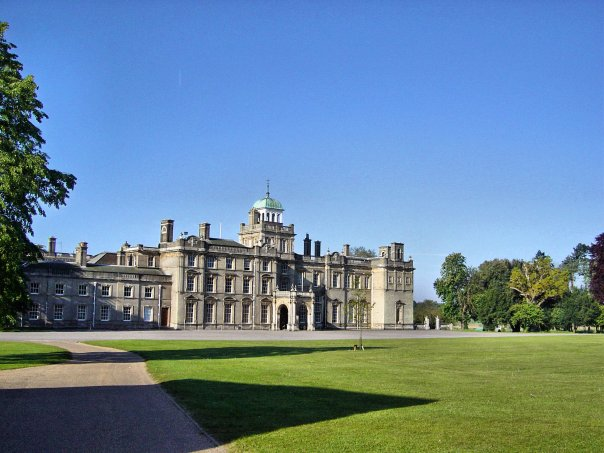
Main School (Culford Hall), North Front

The Skinner and Hastings buildings were added in the 1960s, followed during the 1970s-1990s by an auditorium, pre-prep school, medical centre and biology laboratories. Purpose-built boarding houses and the Ashby Dining Hall (named after the then Chairman of the Governors) were constructed in 1972.

1972 was the year in which Culford amalgamated with its sister school, the East Anglian School for Girls (EASG), becoming one of the first fully co-educational HMC schools. New Houses were formed as follows:

Edwards House	Senior Boys (boarding and day pupils) (named after G. S. Edwards, French & hockey master, Deputy Headmaster 1923–1962)
Cornwallis House	Senior Boys (boarding and day pupils) (named after the Marquess Cornwallis, of Culford Hall)
Jocelyn House	Senior Girls (boarding and day pupils) (name transferred from EASG)
Storey House	Sixth Form Co-educational House - closed 2003 (named after Dr C. Storey, Headmaster 1951–1971)
Robson House	Senior Day Boys - formed 1993 – closed 2012 (named after D. Robson, Headmaster 1971–1992)
Fitzgerald House	Originally Junior Girls - Senior Day Girls since 2003, now Senior Girls (boarding and day pupils) (name transferred from EASG)
Cadogan House	Prep School co-ed since 1996 – (boarding pupils only) (named after Earl Cadogan)

== Coat of arms ==
Coat of arms of Culford School
Notes Granted 10 May 1937. Crest On a wreath Argent and Azure, a book Argent edged Or ensigned with a crown Proper. Escutcheon Argent, on a cross Azure three crowns Or in fess and two escallops of the first in pale, in the first quarter a lion rampant reguardant of the second. Motto 'Viriliter agite estote fortes'

== The school today ==
Although Culford is a selective school, it accepts pupils of a broad ability range. More than half of the senior pupils are boarders. Three schools are housed within the Park:

- The Nursery and Pre-Prep is for pupils aged from 1–7 years old. The Nursery, launched in September 2017, is housed in a newly converted building for 1–2 year olds and the Pre-Prep (for 3 to 7 year old) is based in Fieldgate House, at the east of the Park. The Pre-Prep School is overseen by the head of the Prep School.
- The Prep School is a boarding and day school for 7–13 year olds. It occupies the north of the Park, surrounded by its own pitches, but also uses Senior facilities. The present Head is Claire Bentley, and she is supported by Rory Parker (Deputy Head), Jon Herd (Assistant Head) and Emily Paine (Head of Lower Prep).
- The Senior School is a mixed boarding and day school for 13–18 year olds. The boarding houses overlook parkland and pitches, with academic pursuits taking place in various buildings in the centre of the Park. Pupils join from UK and overseas prep and maintained schools, with scholarships, exhibitions, bursaries, Forces allowances and Methodist Schools assistance being offered. Claire Bentley is the Head, and Dr John Guntrip is the current Deputy Head.

A library of historic volumes is located in an oak-panelled room overlooking Culford Hall's south front, completed for the visit of King Edward VII in December 1904 and now the Sixth form common room. A large contemporary collection of 10,000 books is housed in a free-standing modern building opened in 2015. The Centenary Hall, a facility containing a large hall/auditorium and Studio Theatre was opened in 2006 by HRH The Duke of Gloucester (twenty five years after his first visit for the school's centenary), and was constructed in what was previously a large courtyard enclosed on three sides by the main building.

The Culford Foundation exists to raise funds for special projects that will benefit the pupils of the school and has raised funds for the Pre-Prep nursery and dining hall; an astro-turf sports field; the William Miller Science Centre (built following a £1m donation by an Old Culfordian); the restoration of Culford Hall, the new library and the Art and Design Centre. The Foundation also supports the Old Culfordians Association.

The most recent inspection report of the Prep and Senior schools (February 2020) by the Independent Schools Inspectorate (ISI) concludes that the schools are “Excellent” in all areas.

== Academia ==
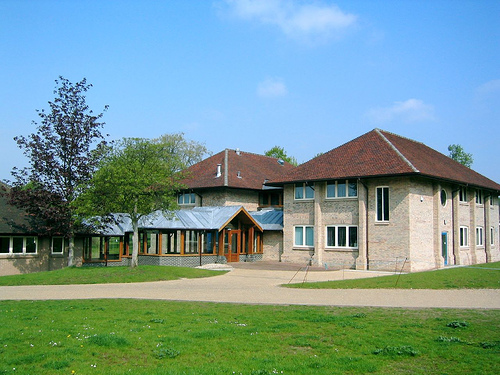
William Miller Science Centre

The ISI 2020 inspection rates academics as Excellent and the Good Schools Guide say that the quality of the pupils’ achievement is good. Pupils are well educated, in accordance with the school's aims of providing an education that is challenging, enriching and fun.

There is a Scholars Programme, plus many societies focused on subjects and areas of interest. Lecturers have included Sir Andrew Motion, Ann Widdecombe, George Alagiah and Henry Olonga.

A Sixth Form Enrichment Programme offers Open University degree modules and pupils also compete in competitions such as the Intermediate Mathematical Challenge. Like many independent schools, Culford teaches the IGCSE.

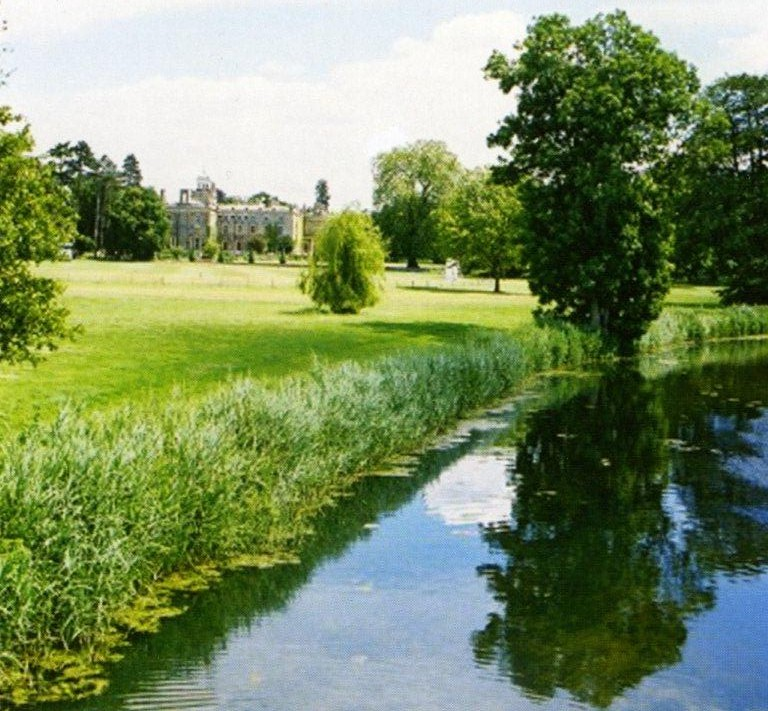
Culford Hall from Lake and Iron Bridge

== Sport and activities ==
Culford offers high performance academies in Tennis and Golf alongside the major competitive sports of rugby, cricket, hockey, netball, athletics, cross-country and swimming. Regional honours are achieved whilst European and England players and champions in hockey, tennis, horse riding, karate, polo and rugby are on the school roll. Pupils compete in events such as the National Schools Rugby Sevens, and the Inter-Schools Hunter Trials.

Numbered amongst current Old Culfordians are an Olympic horserider, a British modern pentathlon champion, a Welsh hockey international, and club rugby and cricket players for Richmond and Middlesex respectively. Previous generations of Old Culfordians have included several hockey players for England and one for Scotland, a captain of the Welsh team, and a Great British hockey Olympian; as well as an England badminton player. The school has also produced numerous Oxford and Cambridge Blues.

In addition to the major sports, Culford offers a wide range of other sports and activities utilising its 480 acres (1.9 km^{2}) of parkland and extensive facilities.

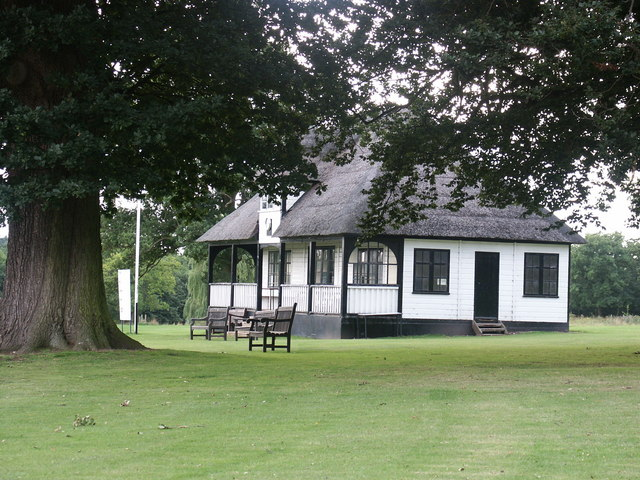
Cricket pavilion

- A sports centre (built in the 1990s) with 25m indoor swimming pool, sports hall with 4-lane cricket nets, bowling machine, squash courts, fitness suite, aerobics and dance studio, video assessment suite, and a climbing wall
- Floodlit astroturf
- Six rugby and five grass hockey pitches
- A 4-court championship standard indoor tennis centre
- Six grass, six hard and six astroturf tennis courts
- Three cricket pitches including cricket square with thatched pavilion, views of the Hall and Park, and grass nets
- A lake, used for fishing and canoeing bordering Repton's gardens and crossed by a cast-iron bridge by Samuel Wyatt (the fifth-oldest in the world, listed Grade I)
- A 9-hole pitch and putt golf course. The school makes use of Flempton Golf Club to play its home matches.
- An indoor golf studio with simulator and radar technology and outdoor covered driving range

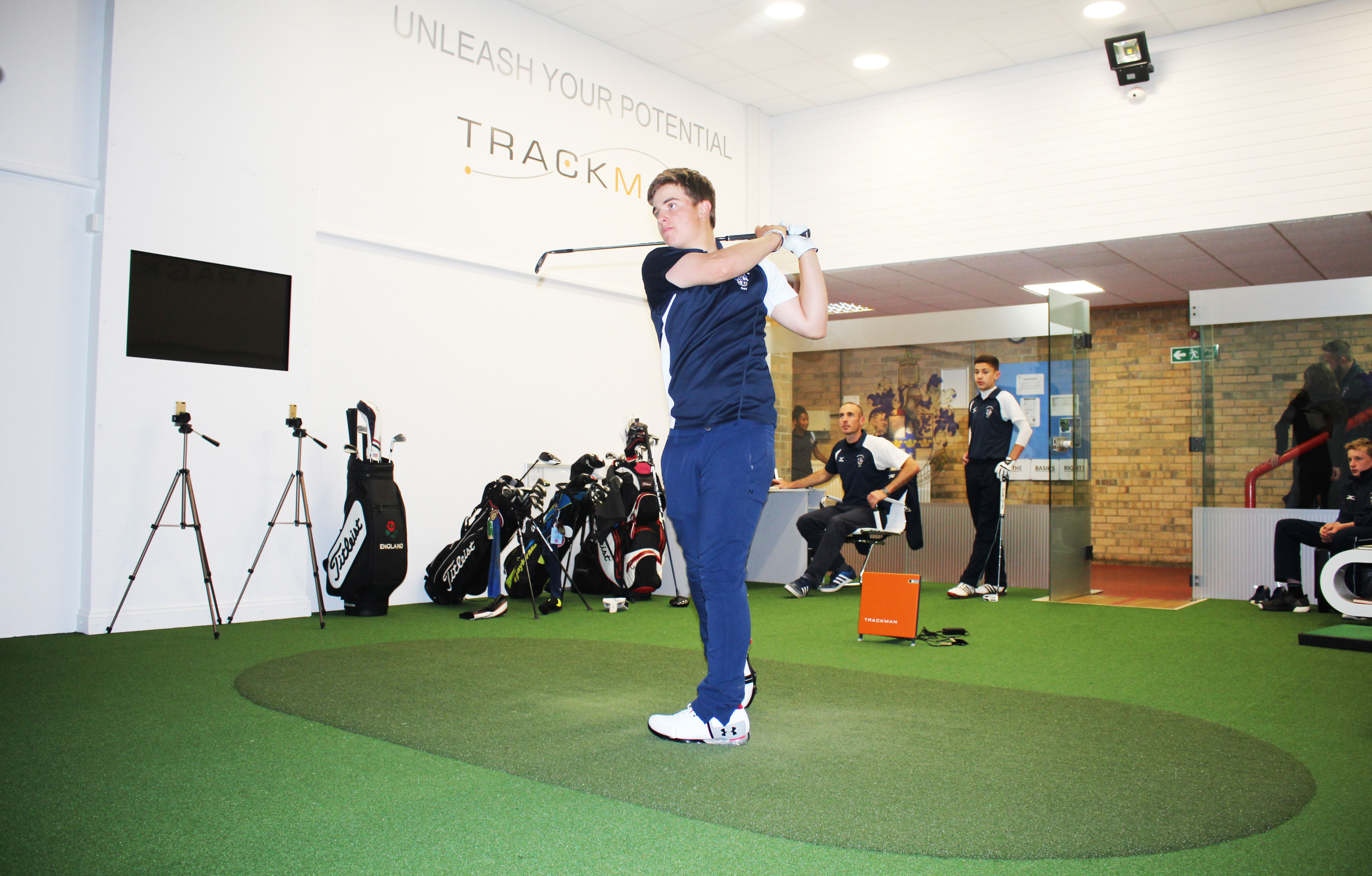
Indoor Golf TrackMan Studio

A further lake at Lackford is used for Sailing, and nearby Thetford Forest is used for outdoor pursuits. Golf is played at a course in neighbouring Flempton. 1962 saw the school become one of the 16 founder members of the Public Schools Old Boys Golf Association, and it competes regularly in the Grafton Morrish Trophy.

The school is linked to the LTA High Performance Centre in Cambridge, and 14 coaches offer a tennis scheme encompassing a junior Academy programme. The school also provides cricket coaching from former Italy international, Andrew Northcote. Culford play an MCC side annually. An Activities Programme offers over sixty pursuits including climbing, clay pigeon shooting, chess, critical thinking, Cub Scouts, debating, Duke of Edinburgh's Award, expeditions, fencing, horse riding, sub aqua and Young Enterprise. In addition, external organisations using Culford's facilities contribute to provision for pupils:

- Northampton Saints Rugby Academy train weekly, as part of their Elite Player Development scheme
- The Eastern Junior Regional Performance Centre for England Hockey is based at Culford, as is a satellite of the Eastern Counties Rugby Union “Schools of Rugby” initiative
- Suffolk County Cricket Youth Squad train regularly, run courses and play matches
- West Suffolk Swimming Team train daily
- The School hosts events such as the European Karate Championships, International Horse Riding Championships, O2 Premiership Rugby Training Camps, International Archery Championships, Suffolk Schools County Cricket tournaments and drama camps.
Sports and Activities – Image Gallery
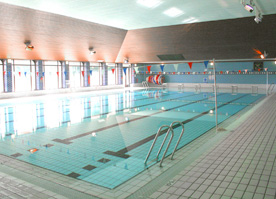
Culford Sports Centre – Pool.

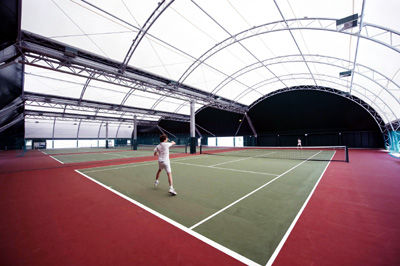
Indoor tennis centre.

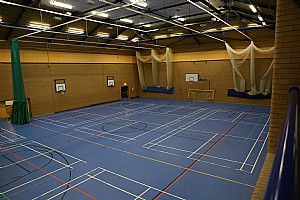
Culford Sports Centre - Hall.

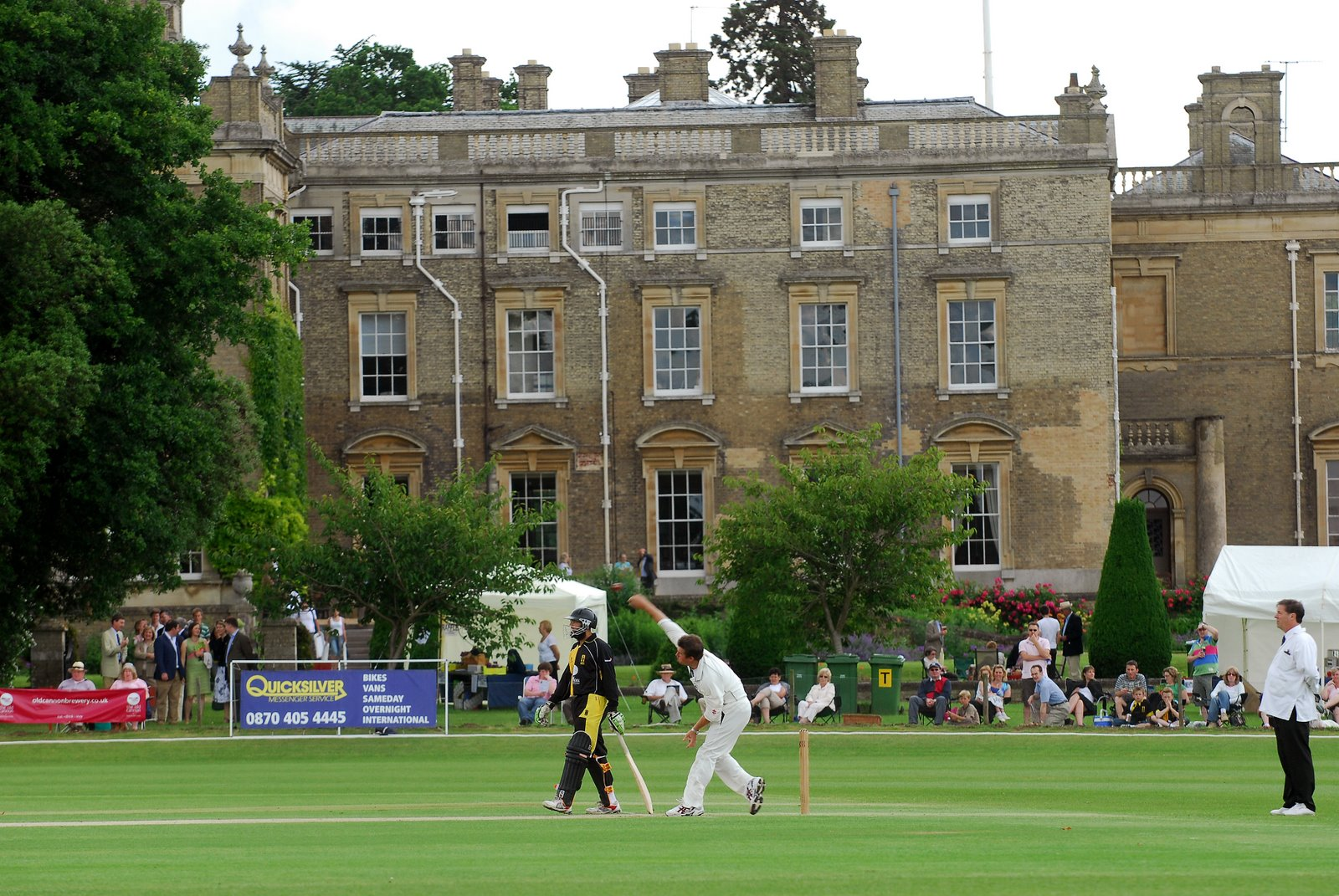
Match on 1st XI Cricket Square.

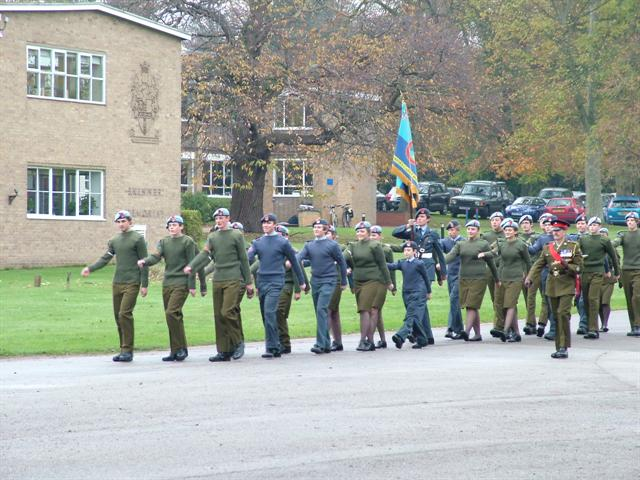
Combined Cadet Force, Armistice Day 2009.

== Combined Cadet Force ==
The CCF's Army section is associated with the Army Air Corps and the First Battalion Royal Anglian Regiment. The CCF is commanded by Captain Sarah Schofield. Weekly training activities include shooting, expeditions, combat manoeuvres, ambush and continuity drills, signals training, orienteering, climbing, kayaking, first aid and lifesaving. The CCF also play an important role in the School's annual Act of Remembrance on Armistice Day.

The CCF Contingent was inspected in 2007 by General Sir John McColl, an Old Culfordian, Colonel of the Royal Anglians and Deputy Supreme Allied Commander Europe. 2009's inspection was carried out by Air Vice Marshal Richard Garwood, parent of a Culfordian and Chief of Staff (Operations) at Headquarters Air Command; and 2011's by General the Lord Dannatt.

The current CCF is the successor to several individual service cadet forces, established during the world wars and at other stages, as well as to Culford's Air Scouts troop which, in 1939, was amongst the first five nationally and which became the largest in eastern England prior to dwindling in the 1960s.

== Headmasters and heads ==
- Herbert A Davidson 1881-1882
- Samuel B Leigh, 1882–1915
- W C Newman, 1915–1924
- John W Skinner 1924-1951
- C Storey 1951-1971
- D Robson, 1971–1992
- J S Richardson, 1992-2004 (Cheltenham College headmaster 2004–2010)
- Julian Johnson-Munday, 2004-2023 (formerly Mill Hill School deputy headmaster)
- Claire Bentley, 2023- current head (formerly head of prep school)

== Notable alumni ==
- John C. A. Barrett — president, World Methodist Council and former headmaster of sister school The Leys
- Bob Blizzard — Labour MP 1997–2010; Lord Commissioner of HM Treasury 2008–2010
- Kofi Adumua Bossman — Justice of the Supreme Court of Ghana 1961 – 1964
- Robert Crawford — former director general of the Imperial War Museum
- I Grenville Cross — Director of Public Prosecutions, Hong Kong, China 1997–2009
- John Cullen — chemical engineer, chairman of the Health and Safety Commission 1983–1993
- Josh Davey — cricketer, Middlesex and Scotland
- Nick de Bois — Conservative MP 2010-2015
- Hugh Falkus — writer and film maker
- Tommy Freeman — rugby player for Northampton Saints and England
- Jayne-Anne Gadhia — former chief executive of Virgin Money UK

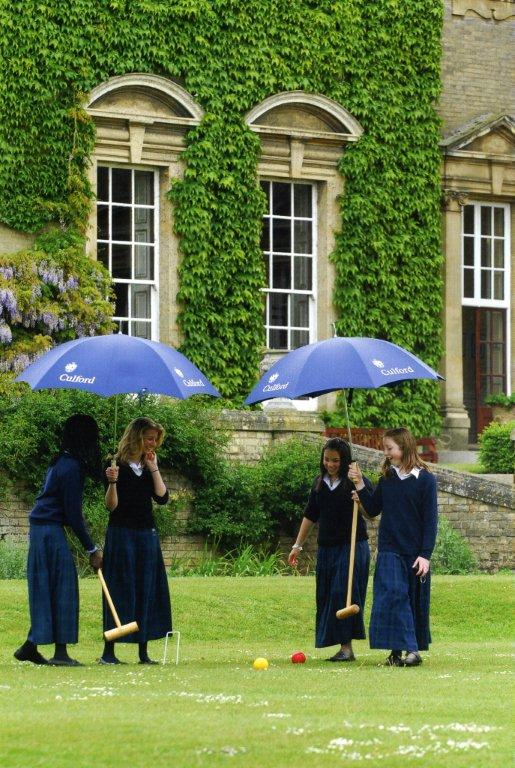
Main School (Culford Hall), south front

- Ian Hendry — actor, most notably The Avengers
- Paul Hopfensperger — politician, GB open water swimmer, best-selling author, musician with The Teazers
- Sharon Hunt — Great Britain 3-Day Eventing Bronze Medalist, 2008 Beijing Summer Olympics
- Kate Jackson — singer, formerly of The Long Blondes
- Peter Jenkins — political columnist and associate editor, The Independent
- Andy Johnson-Laird — pioneer in computer forensics and software reverse engineering
- Lucy Johnston — health editor, The Daily Express
- Philip Johnson-Laird — Stuart Professor of Psychology, Princeton University
- John McColl — Lieutenant Governor of Jersey; Deputy Supreme Allied Commander Europe 2007–2011
- William McFee — Anglo-American novelist, especially of sea-tales; essayist
- William R. Miller CBE — former vice chairman of Bristol-Myers Squibb and benefactor to Culford and St Edmund Hall, Oxford
- John Motson — sports commentator, BBC
- Gary Newbon — Sky Sports presenter
- Andrew Phillips, Baron Phillips of Sudbury — Liberal Democrat politician and chancellor of the University of Essex
- David Plastow — former chairman of Rolls-Royce Motors and chairman and chief executive of Vickers
- Paula Pryke — noted floral artist and author
- Derek Reffell — former Controller of the Navy and Governor of Gibraltar
- John Rose — chief executive, Rolls-Royce, 1996–2011
- Heather J. Sharkey — Marshall Scholar, Fulbright-Hays Scholar, historian of the Middle East and Africa at the University of Pennsylvania, author
- Henry Tang — Chief Secretary of Hong Kong, 2007–11
- Phil Thornalley — songwriter, musician, producer, formerly of The Cure
- John Taylor — first Chief Justice of Lagos
- Colin White — Nelson scholar and director of the Royal Naval Museum

== Controversies ==
- In July 2023 the Headmaster Julian Johnson-Munday was dismissed following an independent investigation, disciplinary and appeal process, finding “he had breached a number of the school's internal policies in relation to the misuse of school funds and property and the treatment of members of staff” citing gross misconduct and a breach of trust. Johnson-Munday appeared at Westminster Magistrates’ Court in January 2026 accused of fraud by false representation, it was alleged Johnson-Munday, used the school’s credit card for personal expense including tickets at Lord's cricket ground and accommodation at the East India Club. He is also accused of using the school’s digger for his own use without permission, to the value of £2,724.50.
- In 2017 two individuals were alleged by Suffolk police to be dealing cannabis to students, with several pupils being suspended by the school for smoking the drug.
- The former head of IT, Gerald Baalham, was convicted in 2014 of dishonestly abusing his position to obtain £32k of computer equipment between August 2012 and December 2013 and sentenced to a two-year prison sentence suspended for two years.
- In 1992 five pupils were expelled and three suspended for smoking cannabis, with the school chef Nicholas Clutterham, 19, taking his own life after being sacked for his part in the drug scandal. A further five pupils were expelled and five suspended in 1999 for similar offences.

== The Fifth Dinner Club ==
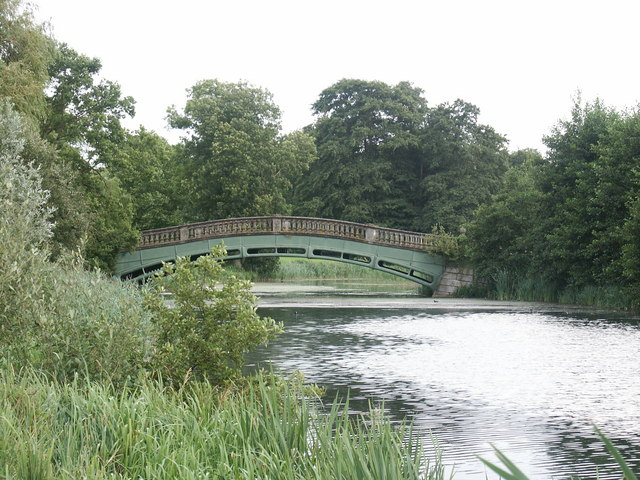
Lake and Iron Bridge

The name of the ‘Fifth Dinner Club’ (FDC) is derived from its foundation in 1926 by five members of the Fifth Form - G G Hawes, R H Tuffs, Gaubert, W B Downs and F J Morgan - to subvert the prefects. However the Fifth Formers eventually became prefects themselves and only prefects have been admitted ever since. It is separate from the school and is run by its members. The club is associated with a motto Diu Vivamus Pingues Moriamur, abbreviated to D.V.P.M. It is also associated with Ye Olde Cheshire Cheese pub on London's Fleet Street, where members first dined in the 1930s and which they visit to this day. From the Charter Rolls of over 680 past and present club alumni, more than 100 retired members and guests attended a celebratory 100th Anniversary Dinner at Culford Hall on 19th September 2026. Retired member D Black (142 inducted in 1949) and S Babes (441 in 1993) welcomed attendees. Current pro tempore president 2026/27 W Frost (673) responded and T Rycroft (440 in 1993) proposed The Loyal Toast. The menu included local East Anglian venison and Baron Bigod cheese paired with Cotes du Rhone and Macon Villages wines. The school presented all attendees with a memorial pair of striped socks.

== Miscellanea ==
- During the 1940s, Basil Brown, the amateur archaeologist, worked as a stoker at the school. Enlisting the help of several Culford boys, he dug out two Roman pottery kilns at nearby West Stow, inspiring Stanley West to return two decades later to unearth West Stow Anglo-Saxon Village.
- Construction of the indoor tennis centre unearthed the body of a Bronze Age child.
- Backdrops of Culford Park, and particularly the thatched cricket pavilion, were featured in the BBC's Lovejoy series.
- The London and North Eastern Railway named one of their Class B17s, no. 2815, “Culford Hall”.

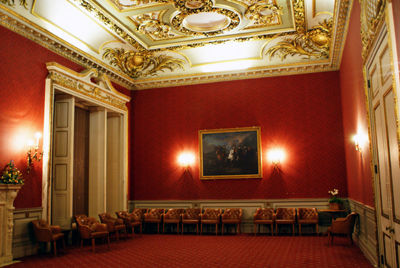
Senior Common Room

- In September 1940, during the Battle of Britain, a German Junkers 88A-1 aircraft was shot down by the RAF over the school's lake, resulting in numerous fragments of the plane disappearing into Cadogan House as souvenirs. The School Archive now has a number of these fragments including the maker's plate and an oxygen bottle.
- A bronze statue of the Victorian racing greyhound Master McGrath on the south lawns of Culford Hall led to some speculation that he is buried there.
