= Bill Miller (British businessman) =

British businessman (1928–2020)

William Robert Miller CBE (1928 – 27 September 2020) was a British-born businessman who was vice-chairman of Bristol-Myers Squibb until 1990. Subsequently, he has become a philanthropist and supporter of scientific, artistic, educational and ecclesiastical causes.

== Life and career ==
William Robert Miller was born in 1928 in Paddington, West London, one of three brothers. In 1939 he was evacuated from the war with his mother and brothers to Bury St Edmunds, Suffolk. He won a scholarship to Culford School, which he attended until 1946 before winning a further scholarship to read PPE at St Edmund Hall, Oxford. Three years of National Service in the RAF intervened once the family moved back to London, and he took up his place at Oxford in 1949, graduating in 1952.

Upon leaving university, Miller began a career in the pharmaceuticals industry with Pfizer, rising to become Area Manager for Central Europe and Africa, before moving to US-based Bristol Laboratories in 1964 as Overseas Resident Manager for Europe (Bristol became Bristol-Myers Squibb, or BMS, in 1989). From 1980 to 1989, he had worldwide executive responsibility for BMS pharmaceutical and nutritional businesses, including research. He was Vice Chairman of the Board from 1985 until his retirement.

With his second wife, Irene Diaman Miller, who had graduated from the Stern School of Business in 1954, Miller settled in New York City. He had three children from his first marriage to Rita (Ian Miller, Jane Tierney, Judy Miller) and two step-children (Konrad Kaletsch, Tatiana Kaletsch). The Miller Family Foundation was established by the Millers in 1991, and supported many charitable organisations.

Miller was appointed Officer of the Most Excellent Order of the British Empire (OBE) in 2000 for services to British Charities in the US and Commander of the Order of the Most Excellent Order of the British Empire (CBE) in the 2011 Birthday Honours for services to UK/US relations in business, and for philanthropy. In 2001, he was made a Knight of Justice in the Most Venerable Order of the Hospital of St. John of Jerusalem. In 2016, he received the First Annual Hero Award from the Anglosphere Society.

Bill Miller died in New York on 27 September 2020, at the age of 92.

== Interests and directorships ==
In addition to his usual activities, Bill Miller was involved as a director, benefactor or supporter of many institutions, of which the following are a cross-section:

Americans for Oxford, Inc.: Vice Chairman, 2001–2017; Board of Directors, 1994 – ; In 2003, appointed to the Oxford University Chancellor's Court of Benefactors and 2012, he was named a Distinguished Friend of Oxford by the university.

Philanthropy: Oxford University, Oxford, UK

William R. Miller Fellowship in Economics at St. Edmund Hall

William R. Miller Fellowship in Biochemistry at St. Edmund Hall

William R. Miller Junior Research Fellow at St. Edmund Hall

Three William R. Miller Graduate Awards at St. Edmund Hall

William R. Miller Building, St. Edmund Hall, Dawson Street (undergraduate residence)

St. Edmund Hall, Oxford: Honorary Fellow

Cold Spring Harbor Laboratory: Trustee 1989–2004; chairman, 1998–04; Honorary Trustee.

Philanthropy: Chaired the William R. Miller Infrastructure Fund; William R. Miller Fellowship at the Watson School of Biological Sciences; William R. and Irene D. Miller Neuroscience Lecture; Charitable Remainder Unitrust legacy to the Watson School of Biological Sciences; William R. and Irene D. Miller Residence, Uplands Farm.

Christ's Hospital, West Sussex, UK

Philanthropy: The Hugh and Vera Olson Trust

Culford School, Bury St. Edmunds, Suffolk: Philanthropy: The William R. Miller Science Center; Academic Bursary into the Sixth Form for the study of Science; Campaign for Culford.

English-Speaking Union of the United States: Chairman, 1996–2009; Chairman Emeritus.

In 2002, he received the Winston Churchill Medal Honor, and in 2009, he received the Founder's Award from the English-Speaking Union.

Manhattan School of Music: Board of Trustees, 1991–2012; Trustee Emeritus. In 2011, he received an Honorary Degree of Doctor of Musical Arts from the School. Philanthropy: The William R. and Irene D. Miller Recital Hall; Opportunity Fund to support the Center for Music Entrepreneurship.

Metropolitan Opera Association: Managing Director, 1999 – ;. Philanthropy: Part funded fourteen new productions at Metropolitan Opera; sole funder of new production Don Carlo in 2010.

Opera Orchestra of New York: President, Board of Directors, 1997–2005.

Queen Elizabeth II September 11 Garden: Chairman, 2009–2011; Chairman Emeritus.

Philanthropy: Founders Endowment Queen Elizabeth II September 11 Garden, NY

St. George's Society: Member, Past President, Member of Advisory Council. In 2007, he received the Order of St. George's Society New York Medal. Philanthropy: Gifts to St. George's Society Capital Campaign, New York

St. Paul's Cathedral Trust in America: Founder, Chairman 1993–2009; Chairman Emeritus.

In 2009, he received the Sir Christopher Wren Award from the Cathedral and in 2011, named Fellow – College of Advocates of St. Paul's Cathedral. Philanthropy: Donated ten new chandeliers in the nave of the cathedral, London, UK; William R. and Irene D. Miller Organ Scholar at St. Paul's Cathedral, London, UK.

St. Thomas Aquinas College, Sparkill, NY: In 2009, he received an Honorary Degree of Doctor of Commercial Science. Philanthropy: The William R. and Irene D. Miller Scholarship for Music.

St. Thomas Church Fifth Avenue, NY: Vestry 2002–08; 2010–2015. Philanthropy: The William R. Miller Fund for New Music Composition; Lead donor, The Irene D. and William R. Miller Chancel Organ in Memory of John Scott, St. Thomas Church.

Miller's portfolio of Board directorships since retiring from BMS is extensive, the following is a selection:

- Elusys Therapeutics: Chairman, 2000–2007; Director, 2007–2009
- ImClone Systems: Director, 1996–2007
- Isis Pharmaceuticals: Director, 1994–2000
- SIBIA Neurosciences, Inc., chairman, 1991–1999
- St. Jude Medical, Inc., Director, 1991–1998
- Vion Pharmaceuticals: Chairman, 1995–2009

Current Activities

American Fund for Westminster Abbey: Founder 2012, Chairman 2012– ;

Americans for Oxford, Inc.: Board of Directors 1994 – ;

Lincoln Center for the Performing Arts, Inc.: Board of Directors 2011 – ;

Metropolitan Opera: Managing Director 1999 – ;
