= All Saints Church, Wordwell =

Coordinates: 52.3160°N 0.6805°E

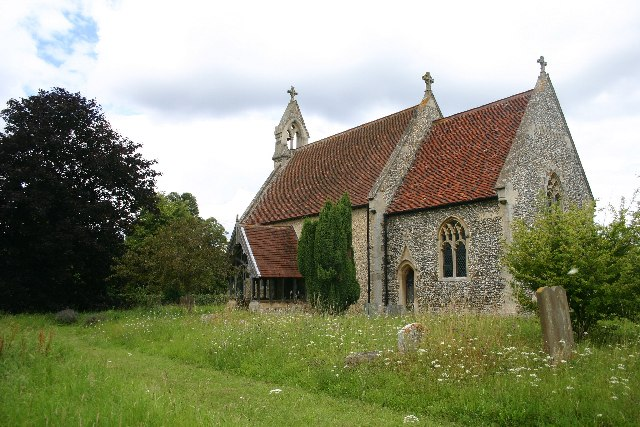
- All Saints Church, Wordwell, from the southeast

- Location in Suffolk
- OS grid reference: TL 828 720
- Location: Wordwell, Suffolk
- Country: England
- Denomination: Anglican
- Website: Churches Conservation Trust

Architecture
- Functional status: Redundant
- Heritage designation: Grade I
- Designated: 14 July 1955
- Architect: S. S. Teulon (restoration)
- Architectural type: Church
- Style: Norman, Gothic, Gothic Revival
- Completed: 1866

Specifications
- Materials: Flint, tiled roofs, timber porch

All Saints Church is a redundant Anglican church in the village of Wordwell, Suffolk, England. It is recorded in the National Heritage List for England as a designated Grade I listed building, and is under the care of the Churches Conservation Trust. It stands in a small community alongside the B1106 road between Bury St Edmunds and Brandon.

== History ==
The church dates from about 1100. During the 14th and 15th centuries new windows were installed to replace the 12th-century lancet windows. A porch was added in about 1500. By 1757 the church was in a "run down" condition, but it had been "put into good order" by 1829. Later in the 19th century a restoration was carried out between 1857 and 1866 by S. S. Teulon. This included work on the west front, the bellcote, the porch, the priest's doorway, the roofs, the pulpit and the reredos.

== Architecture ==
=== Exterior ===
All Saints is constructed in flint rubble, with freestone dressings. The roofs are tiled, and the porch is timber. Its plan is simple, consisting of a nave with a south porch, a chancel, and a bellcote at the west end. The church contains Norman features, while the windows added later are in Decorated style. The north and south doorways are Norman with round-headed arches; they are identical in form, and have Saxon influences. The tympanum of the south doorway contains a pair of lions with dog-like features surrounded by foliage. The north doorway is blocked, and its tympanum contains two human figures, one holding a ring. There is a grid-like object between them. It has been suggested that they represent Saint Catherine and her wheel, and Saint Lawrence with a gridiron.

=== Interior ===
The chancel arch is also Norman, as is the circular font. The benches date from the 15th century and have carvings. All the bench ends have poppyheads. Some of the benches have additional carvings, including representations of animals. One bench is carved on its back with wild boars, and figures having human faces but animal bodies. The rest of the fittings date from the 1888 restoration.

== See also ==
- List of churches preserved by the Churches Conservation Trust in the East of England
