= Northgate House =

Building in Bury St Edmunds, England

Coordinates: 52°14′49″N 0°43′00″E

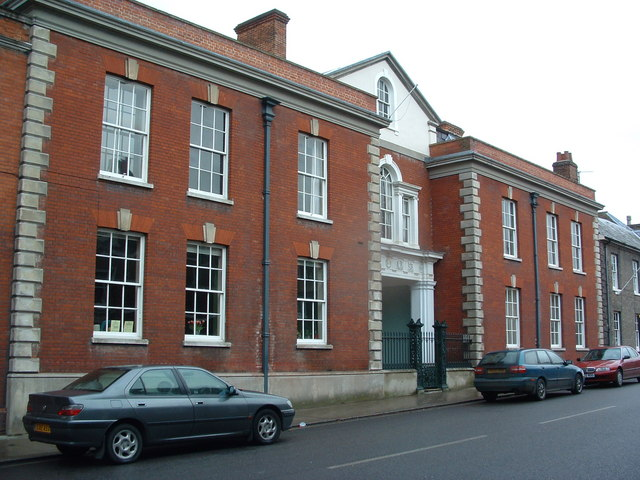
Northgate House, Bury St Edmunds

Northgate House is a Grade I listed house in Northgate Street, Bury St Edmunds. It was home to the novelist Norah Lofts from 1955 until her death in 1983.
