= West Stow =

Village in West Suffolk, England

Coordinates: 52.302°N 0.668°E

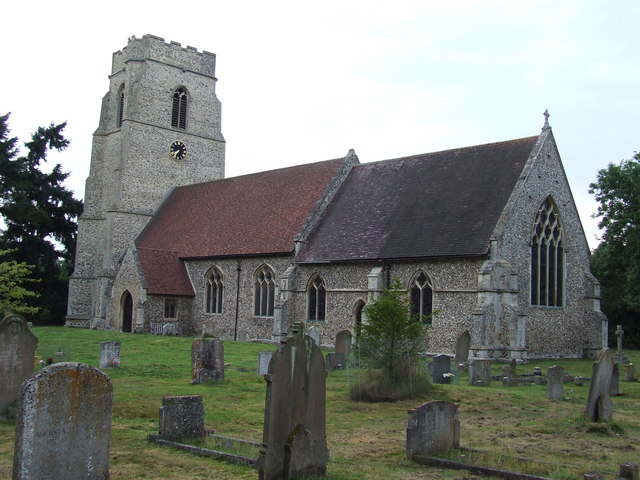

- Location within Suffolk
- Interactive map of West Stow
- Area: 21.29 km^{2} (8.22 sq mi) Includes Wordwell
- Population: 174 (2011) including Wordwell
  - Density: 8/km^{2} (21/sq mi)
- OS grid reference: TL820705
- Civil parish: West Stow
- District: West Suffolk
- Shire county: Suffolk
- Region: East
- Country: England
- Sovereign state: United Kingdom
- Post town: Bury St Edmunds
- Postcode district: IP28
- Dialling code: 01284
- Police: Suffolk
- Fire: Suffolk
- Ambulance: East of England
- UK Parliament: West Suffolk

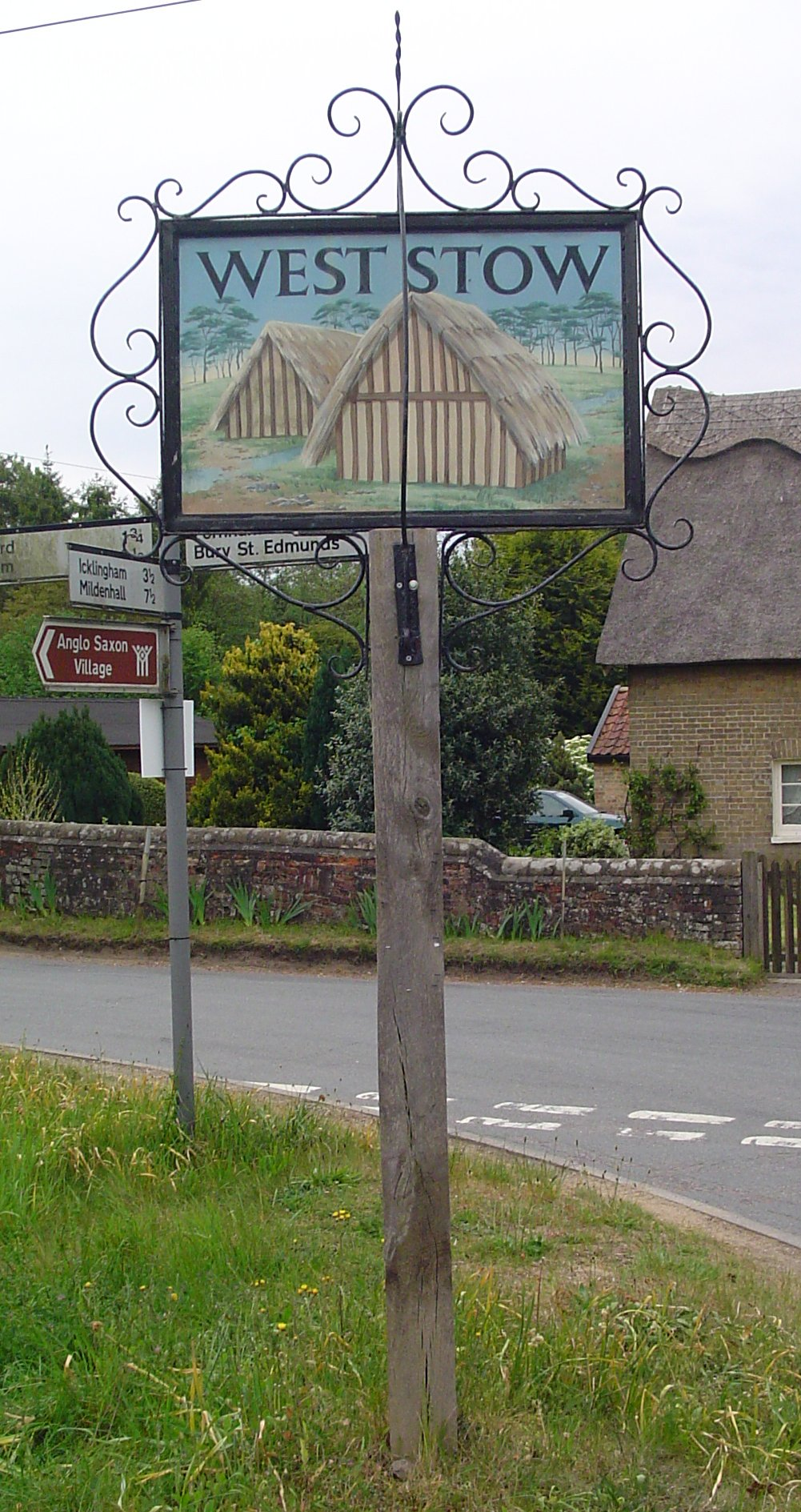
Signpost in West Stow

West Stow is a village and civil parish in the West Suffolk district, in the county of Suffolk, England. The village lies north of Bury St. Edmunds, south of Mildenhall and Thetford and west of the villages of Culford and Ingham in the area known as the Breckland. This area is located near the Lark River Valley and was settled from around AD 420–650. In 2021 the parish had a population of 168.

Its name may come from Anglo-Saxon wēste stōw, meaning a "deserted place", rather than "western place".

West Stow is home to the West Stow Anglo-Saxon Village where visitors may see reconstructed Anglo-Saxon houses, and often living history re-enactments of early medieval life. Fullers Mill Garden, run by Perennial (the Gardeners' Royal Benevolent Society), is open to the public. West Stow Hall lies to the north of the village, while West Stow Country Park lies close to the River Lark, which flows to the south and west of the village.

== Archaeology ==
=== Historical digs ===
A major archaeological dig undertaken from 1965 to 1972, headed by Stanley West of West Suffolk Archaeology Unit, revealed a well-preserved Anglo-Saxon site beneath the sands of the Breckland. West's findings contributed to much of what is now known about this area. The site's layout tells us much about the way of life in this period. This area is set up with a large hall in the middle of the village surrounded by other houses and structures. This suggests a tight-knit community, with the inhabitants using the large hall for events such as feasts and story-telling. During the excavation 69 houses, 7 halls and 7 other structures were found. The community lived with their extended families in their houses, with each house containing around 10 family members. The people of this area still traded with their homeland, as is evidenced by the glass in the necklaces and other metals that were found at the site, but not produced locally.

The Anglo-Saxon community that was found here was not the first to settle in the area. The remains of circular huts with ditched enclosures suggest occupation by Iron Age farmers. There were also tools found that suggest that Mesolithic warriors had hunted in this area, and burial grounds and cultivation which suggest settlement of a Neolithic group.

A pagan Anglo-Saxon burial ground was also excavated. The archaeologists revealed that the village moved the mile or so east to its current location following Christianisation.

=== West Stow Anglo-Saxon Village ===
Alongside the recreated village are the archaeological collections formerly housed at Moyse's Hall Museum Bury St Edmunds. These are collections of archaeological findings that were made in the region between Devil's Dyke and the line between Littleport and Shippea Hill (i.e. along the borderline of East Cambridgeshire and Suffolk) from the Stone Age, the Bronze Age and the Iron Age. Findings include the Isleham Hoard of more than 6500 pieces of bronze, in particular swords, spear-heads, arrows, axes, knives, daggers, armour, decorative equipment (in particular for horses) and many fragments of sheet bronze, all dating from the late Bronze Age. The swords show holes where rivets or studs held the wooden hilt in place (studs were usually made of bronze except for commanders who had silver-studded swords or for a commander-in-chief who had a gold-studded sword).

=== Farming techniques ===
Among the more interesting findings of the excavations pertain to the farming aspect of this culture. This village, and others like it, replaced Roman farms after the imperial administration left Britain. The Anglo-Saxons settled in small villages that were generally self-sustaining. Within these self-sufficient communities there is evidence that these peoples were more likely to provide for themselves through a farming lifestyle than a foraging one. Within the archaeological remains there were more domesticated animal species found than wild animal species, indicating less dependence on hunting as a means of survival, and supports the idea that they were farmers. The settlers in this area were thought to be from a different area, with German descent being the most likely area, and as such it is interesting to see what farming techniques may be employed by this group. Since the landscapes are quite different, it would be interesting to see if the newly settled group would use a German style of farming in this new terrain. This area helps to provide some insight into these farming adaptations. Within animal husbandry, however, this group was more likely to use elements found within the native system of the country.

== Notable residents ==
- Edward Proger (1618/21-1713), Member of Parliament for Breconshire, Page of Honour to King Charles I, Groom of the Bedchamber for King Charles II and Lord of the manor of West Stow Hall.
