= Culford Park =

Country house in Suffolk, England

Coordinates: 52.300921°N 0.689156°E

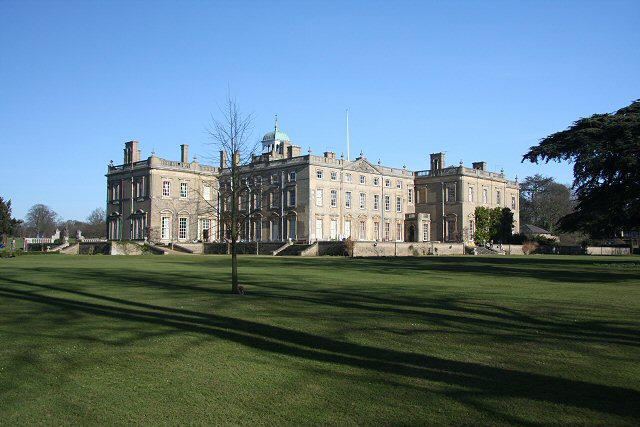
Culford Park

Culford Park in Culford, Suffolk, England, is a country house that is the former seat of the Bacon, Cornwallis and Cadogan families, and now the home of Culford School.

== History of the Park ==
From at least 1429 the Coote family had lived at Culford and in 1524 Christopher Coote was lord of the manor. In 1540 Culford was granted by the Crown to the Bacon family and in 1591 Sir Nicholas Bacon built a red-brick hall on the same site as the present house. The estate passed to the Cornwallis family in 1660 and during the middle of the 18th century 'T Wright' (possibly Thomas Wright (1711-86), the landscape gardener) was employed. Wright produced a map of the park dated 1742 which shows a formal landscape of avenues, rides and vistas, through geometrically shaped blocks of woodland. Between 1790 and 1796 Samuel Wyatt was commissioned to remodel the house for the first Marquis Cornwallis and in 1791 Humphry Repton (1752-1818) provided advice on landscaping the park, preparing a Red Book in 1792 (Williamson 1993). The estate remained in the Cornwallis family until the second Marquess died in 1823, by which time it had been greatly extended. Culford was sold the following year to Richard Benyon De Beauvoir and an estate map of 1834 shows the major expansion of the designed landscape on all boundaries. From circa 1839 the Rev Edward Benyon continued to embellish the estate. In 1889 the estate was sold again, this time to the fifth Earl Cadogan who commissioned the architect William Young to remodel the house in the Italian style. New stables were built, the gardens were altered and considerable additions made to the village.

Following the death of the sixth Earl in 1933 the estate was sold. The core of the park, together with the house, became the home of Culford School (bought 1935) in whose hands it remains today.

== Iron bridge ==
Crossing the lake to West of the Hall is an iron bridge constructed by Samuel Wyatt c.1804. The design is closely based on a bridge patented by Wyatt in 1800 and is made of channelled granite abutments from which five tubular cast-iron sections repeated six times form the 60ft span, the largest of the eight surviving cast iron bridges built between 1790 - 1810. The 80 tons of iron castings were produced by Hawks and Co of Gateshead at a cost of £1,457. The bridge is of exceptional interest as one of the earliest bridges with an unmodified cast-iron structure to survive, and is the earliest known example with hollow ribs. The structure received a Grade I listing on 15 May 1996.

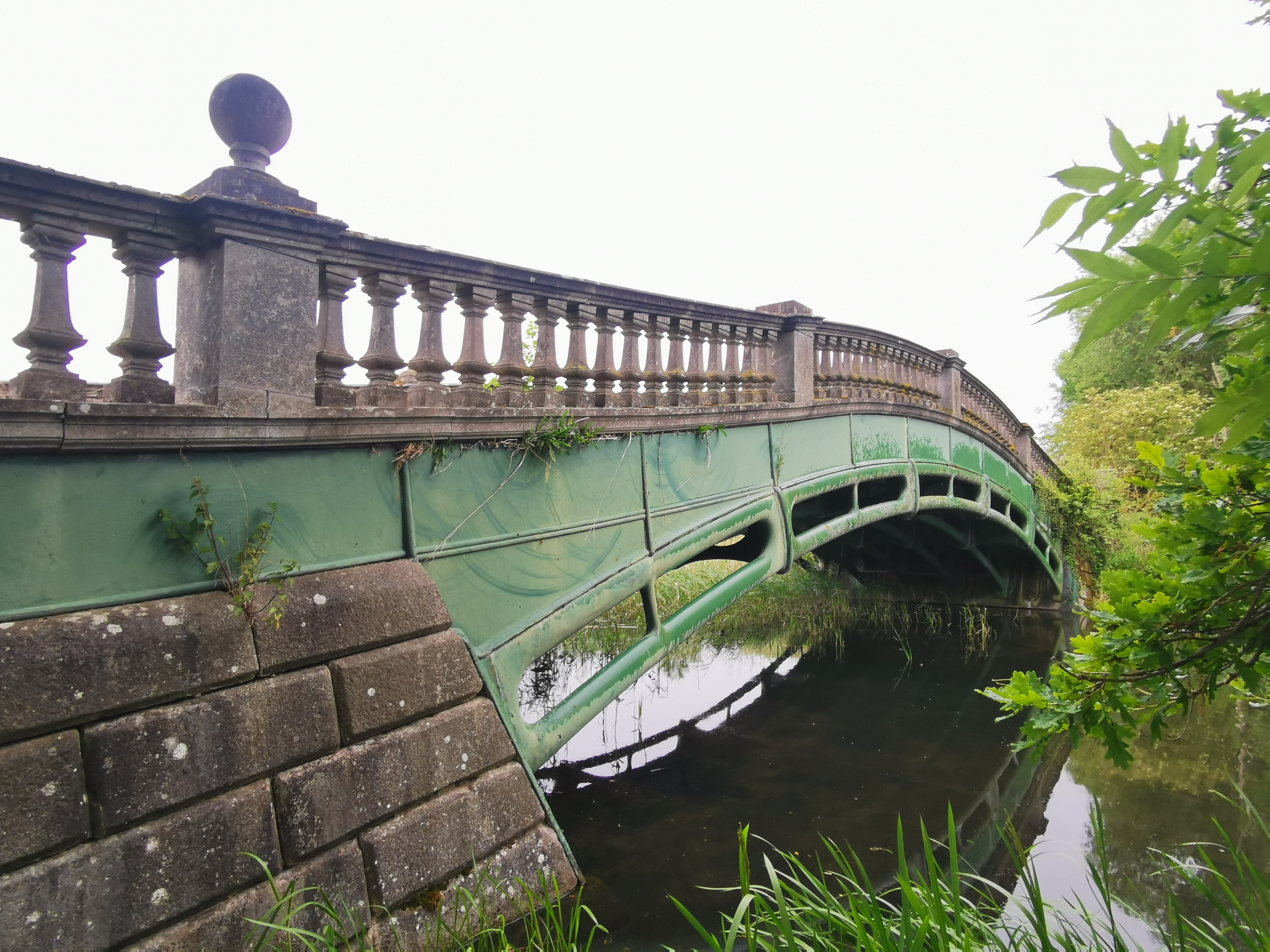
The iron bridge
