= West Stow Hall =

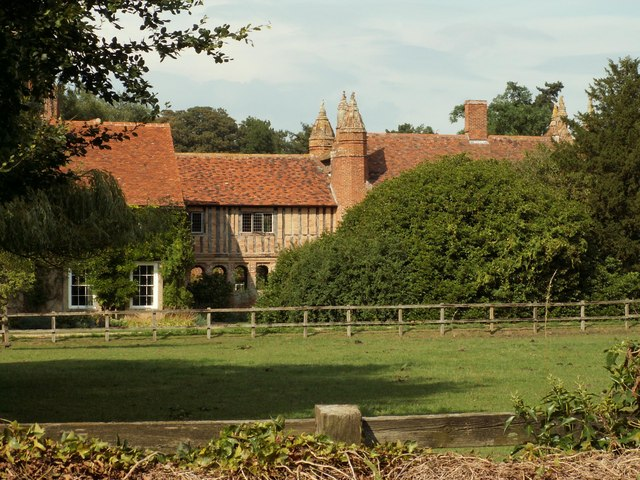
- West Stow Hall

- Location within Suffolk
- 52°18′22″N 0°39′44″E
- Type: Manor House
- Location: West Stow

History
- Built: 16th century

Site notes
- Area: Suffolk
- Architectural style: Tudor

Listed Building – Grade I
- Official name: West Stow Hall
- Designated: 14 July 1955
- Reference no.: 1031269

West Stow Hall is a Tudor manor house in West Stow, Suffolk, England, near Bury St Edmunds. It was begun in around 1520 for Sir John Croftes, Master of the Horse to Mary Tudor.

== History ==
In 1526 Sir John Croftes leased the remainder of West Stow from the Abbot of Bury St Edmunds, which he purchased from the Crown after the dissolution of the Abbey for £497. The gatehouse was an independent building from the house before it was connected to the main house with a colonnade built by Sir John's grandson, in about 1580. In the 19th century restoration of the house, in a room above the entrance a wall-painting, known as the 'Four Ages of Man', was found, thought to date to around 1575. The house's original moat was filled in by 1840, and it was bridged by the gatehouse, passing under two arches beneath it, the tops of which can still be seen in the shrub border of the south side
