= Culford =

Village and civil parish in Suffolk, United Kingdom

Coordinates: 52.297°N 0.693°E

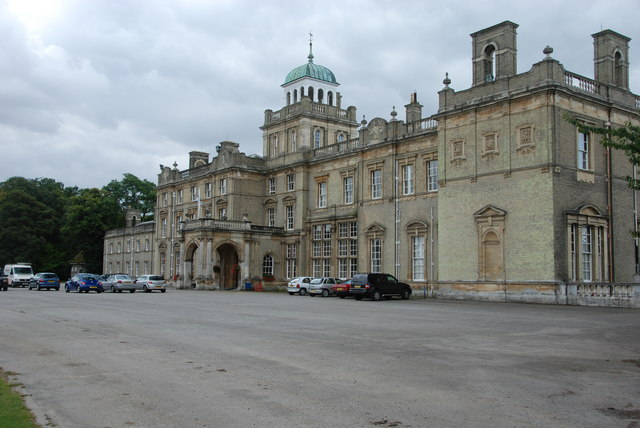
- Culford Hall

- Location within Suffolk
- Area: 9.02 km^{2} (3.48 sq mi)
- Population: 578 (2011)
  - Density: 64/km^{2} (170/sq mi)
- District: West Suffolk
- Shire county: Suffolk
- Region: East
- Country: England
- Sovereign state: United Kingdom
- Post town: Bury St Edmunds
- Postcode district: IP28
- Dialling code: 01284
- UK Parliament: West Suffolk

Culford is a village and civil parish about 4 miles (6 km) north of Bury St Edmunds and 62 miles (100 km) north east of London in the West Suffolk district of Suffolk, England.

According to the 2011 Census the parish had a population of 578, a decrease from 620 recorded at the 2001 census.

A tributary of the River Lark, known as Culford Stream, flows through the centre of the village being fed from Ampton Water in Great Livermere. It continues Westward into West Stow before joining the River Lark at Clough Staunch on the edge of Lackford Lakes.

The main village developed along a straight road called "The Street" and there are also some smaller residential areas in Culford, like Benyon gardens, a complex of cul-de-sacs. Most of the houses in central Culford date from the second half of the 1800s and were built as part of the Culford Estate while those at the edges of the village are post-war and later. The centre of the village, along with the Park, and most of West Stow is a conservation area which was established on 4 December 1997. The village also encompasses the hamlets of Culford Heath and Chimney Mills.

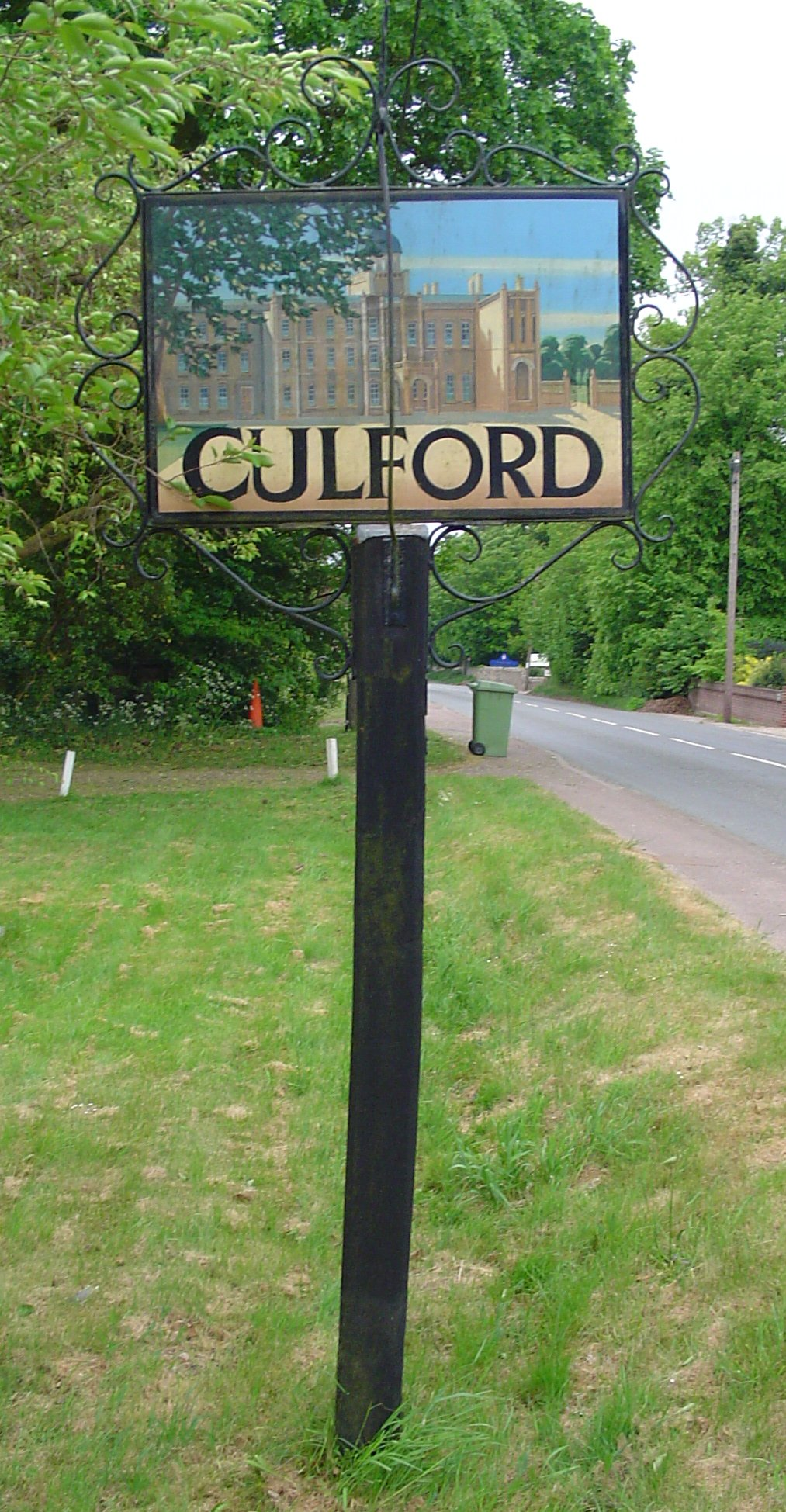
Village sign in Culford

Culford is home to Culford School, a public school and a member of the Methodist Schools Foundation. The school occupies a former stately home in Culford Park, rebuilt in 1796 for the Cornwallis family.

== History ==
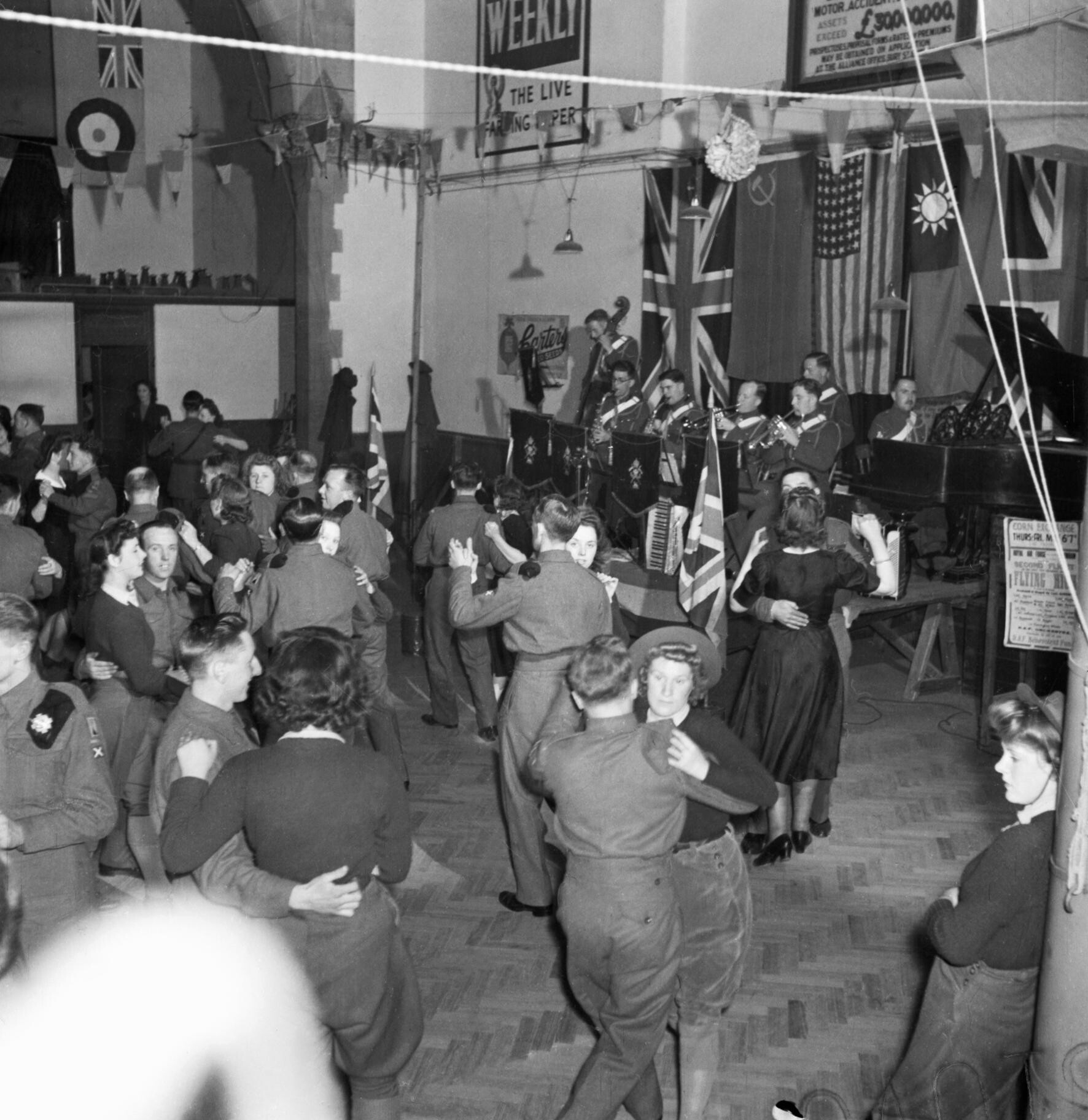
Ballroom in Culford during World War II, 1943

The village's name is derived from the words Cula's Ford, Cula presumed to be name of local leader.

The village is mentioned as Culeforde in the S1225 charter of 1040 AD where Thurketel grants the lands to Bury St Edmunds Abbey.

The Domesday Book records the population of Culford in 1086 to be 32 households made up of 2 villagers, 19 freemen, 9 smallholders, and 2 slaves along with 1 cattle, 2 pigs, 85 sheep, and 14 acres of meadow.

In April and May 1291, King Edward I stayed at the manor in Culford during his visit to Bury St Edmunds Abbey where he agreed that royal justices would not in future sit within the Liberty of St Edmund.

In 1804, The Iron Bridge was constructed over the tributary of the River Lark, that flows through Culford Park. It was the world's first iron bridge to be constructed with hollow segments, built to the design of Samuel Wyatt, and is the only Grade I listed structure in the parish.

Culford's public house, The White Hart (now known as Benyon Lodge), was closed in December 1840 by Richard Benyon De Beauvoir, owner of the Culford Estate between 1824 and 1883, because he regarded it as "a scene of moral debauchery".

The first mention of a postal service in Culford is in July 1852, when a type of postmark known as an undated circle was issued. The post office closed in January 1990 and has since been turned into Culford Day nursery.

During World War II a training camp for the Women's Timber Corps operated at Culford, based at a purpose-built development of huts.

== Population change ==
Population growth in Culford from 1801 to 1891
Year	1801	1811	1821	1831	1841	1851	1881	1891
Population	244	239	291	327	352	348	299	364
Number of Houses	-	-	-	55	70	67	73	78
Source: A Vision of Britain Through Time & NOMIS

Population growth in Culford from 1901 to 2001
Year	1901	1911	1921	1931	1951	1961	2001	2011
Population	313	325	284	286	286	286	620	578
Number of Houses	78	-	78	76	89	96	163	184
Source: A Vision of Britain Through Time & NOMIS

== Governance ==
Culford lies in the West Suffolk District of the shire county of Suffolk. The four tiers of government & their respective representatives are:

- West Suffolk Parliamentary Constituency Matthew Hancock
- Suffolk County Council Thingoe North Division, Beccy Hopfensperger
- West Suffolk District Council Risby Ward, Susan Glossop
- Culford, West Stow and Wordwell Parish Council

Culford, West Stow and Wordwell Parish Councill has 7 elected members, 4 for Culford, 2 for West Stow and 1 for Wordwell.

In terms of community planning the parish does not currently have a Parish Plan or Village Design Statement.

== Notable residents ==
- Earl Cornwallis (1660-1824), Aristocratic family and politicians
- Sir Nathaniel Bacon KB (1585–1627), Painter
- Richard Benyon De Beauvoir (1769–1854), Politician, philanthropist, who was (MP) for Pontefract from 1802 to 1806, and for Wallingford from 1806 to 1812. A Justice of the Peace, Deputy Lieutenant for the county of Berkshire, and High Sheriff of Berkshire.
- George Cadogan, 5th Earl Cadogan (1840-1915), Major in the Royal Fusiliers, Lord Privy Seal from 1886 to 1892, Lord Lieutenant of Ireland from 1895 to 1902, first Mayor of the Metropolitan Borough of Chelsea in 1900, and a Justice of the Peace.
- Gerald Cadogan, 6th Earl Cadogan (1869-1933), captain in the Suffolk Regiment and later with the South African Constabulary, member of the International Olympic Committee.
- Henry Cadogan, Viscount Chelsea (1868-1908), Conservative MP for Bury St Edmunds, captain in the 3rd Battalion of the Royal Fusiliers
