= Wordwell =

Village in Suffolk, England

Coordinates: 52.317°N 0.683°E

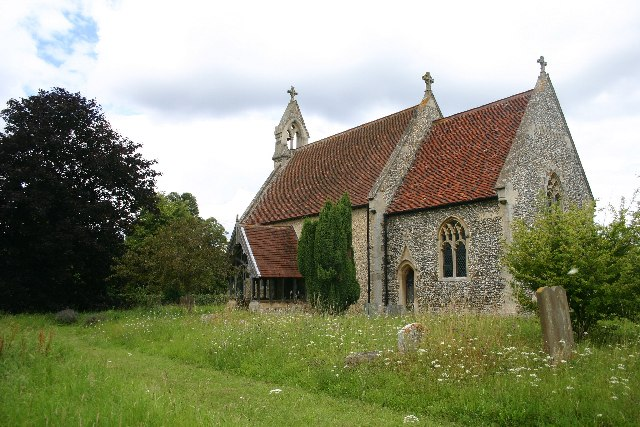
- Wordwell Church

- Location within Suffolk
- Population: 20
- Civil parish: Wordwell
- District: West Suffolk
- Shire county: Suffolk
- Region: East
- Country: England
- Sovereign state: United Kingdom
- Post town: Bury St Edmunds
- Postcode district: IP28
- Dialling code: 01284
- UK Parliament: West Suffolk

Wordwell is a small village and civil parish in the West Suffolk district of Suffolk, England, about five miles north of Bury St Edmunds. The village was hit by the Black Death in 1348 and never recovered in terms of population; in 2005 it was estimated to have only 20 residents. During the 19th and early 20th centuries it was part of the Culford Estate. From 1974 to 2019 it was in St Edmundsbury district.

The village is mentioned as Wridewellan in the S1225 charter of 1040 AD where Thurketel grants the lands to Bury Abbey.

All Saints Church is largely Norman but with Victorian alterations. Wordwell is also one of very few Thankful Villages, that is to say one which lost no men during either world war, but it is unclear whether any men left the village to serve in the first place. The church has carvings on benches and in stone.

A mass grave, probably from the time of the Black Death, was found when electricity was provided to the church. Google Earth shows the outlines of buildings that once stood on the other side of the road.
