= St Edmundsbury Borough Council elections =

Local government elections in Suffolk, England

St Edmundsbury Borough Council in Suffolk, England, was elected every four years. After the last boundary changes in 2003, 45 councillors were elected from 31 wards. The council was abolished in 2019, with the area becoming part of West Suffolk.

== Political control ==
From the first election to the council in 1973 until its abolition in 2019, political control of the council was held by the following parties:

| Party in control | Years |
|---|---|
| Conservative | 1973–1991 |
| No overall control | 1991–1995 |
| Labour | 1995–1999 |
| Conservative | 1999–2001 |
| No overall control | 2001–2003 |
| Conservative | 2003–2019 |

=== Leadership ===
The leaders of the council from 1995 until 2019 were:

| Councillor | Party | From | To |
|---|---|---|---|
| Gerry Kiernan | Labour | 1995 | May 1999 |
| Mike Brundle | Conservative | May 1999 | 2000 |
| Derek Redhead | Conservative | 2000 | Apr 2002 |
| Ray Nowak | Labour | May 2002 | 2003 |
| John Griffiths | Conservative | May 2003 | 31 Mar 2019 |

John Griffiths served as leader of the West Suffolk shadow authority for part of the year prior to the new council coming into effect in 2019. He subsequently became the first leader of West Suffolk District Council after the first elections to the new council in May 2019.

== Council elections ==
Composition of the council
| Year | Conservative | Labour | Liberal Democrats (Note: Includes totals for the predecessors of the Liberal Democrats, the Liberal Party and SDP (both of which participated in the Alliance).) | UKIP | Green | Independents & Others | Council control after election |
|---|---|---|---|---|---|---|---|
Local government reorganisation; council established (44 seats)
| 1973 | 26 | 11 | 0 | – | – | 7 | Conservative |
| 1976 | 30 | 9 | 0 | – | 0 | 5 | Conservative |
New ward boundaries (44 seats)
| 1979 | 32 | 8 | 1 | – | 0 | 3 | Conservative |
| 1983 | 30 | 9 | 3 | – | 0 | 2 | Conservative |
| 1987 | 31 | 8 | 4 | – | 0 | 1 | Conservative |
| 1991 | 20 | 11 | 5 | – | 0 | 8 | No overall control |
| 1995 | 14 | 23 | 5 | 0 | 0 | 2 | Labour |
| 1999 | 23 | 16 | 2 | 0 | 0 | 3 | Conservative |
New ward boundaries (45 seats)
| 2003 | 28 | 12 | 2 | 0 | 0 | 3 | Conservative |
| 2007 | 36 | 3 | 3 | 0 | 0 | 3 | Conservative |
| 2011 | 38 | 3 | 0 | 0 | 0 | 4 | Conservative |
| 2015 | 36 | 2 | 0 | 4 | 1 | 2 | Conservative |
Council abolished; merged into West Suffolk District Council

== Results maps ==
1979 results map

1983 results map

1987 results map

1991 results map

1995 results map

1999 results map

2003 results map

2007 results map

2011 results map

2015 results map

== By-election results ==
A by-election occurs when seats become vacant between council elections. Below is a summary of by-elections from 1983 onwards. Full by-election results are listed under the last regular election preceding the by-election and can be found by clicking on the ward name.

=== 1983-1994 ===
| Ward | Date | Incumbent party | Winning party |
|---|---|---|---|
| Horringer | 10 September 1987 | Conservative | Conservative |
| Westgate | 19 May 1988 | Conservative | Conservative |
| Great Barton | 30 March 1989 | Conservative | Conservative |
| Withersfield | 15 June 1989 | Conservative | Conservative |
| Sextons | 30 July 1992 | Conservative | Conservative |

=== 1995-2006 ===
| Ward | Date | Incumbent party | Winning party |
|---|---|---|---|
| Eastgate | 7 December 1995 | Labour | Labour |
| Clements | 5 September 1996 | Labour | Labour |
| Ixworth | 21 November 1996 | Conservative | Conservative |
| Ixworth | 6 March 1997 | Conservative | Conservative |
| Kedington | 23 April 1998 | Labour | Labour |
| Stanton | 10 September 1998 | Labour | Conservative |
| St Olaves | 7 June 2001 | Labour | Labour |
| Westgate | 25 April 2002 | Conservative | Conservative |
| Honington | 31 October 2002 | Conservative | Conservative |
| Risbygate | 20 May 2004 | Conservative | Independent |
| Haverhill East | 10 June 2004 | Labour | Conservative |
| Barningham | 9 September 2004 | Conservative | Conservative |
| Risby | 31 March 2005 | Labour | Conservative |
| Haverhill South | 5 May 2005 | Labour | Labour |
| Westgate | 16 February 2006 | Conservative | Conservative |
| Kedington | 15 June 2006 | Conservative | Conservative |

=== 2007-2019 ===
| Ward | Date | Incumbent party | Winning party |
|---|---|---|---|
| Haverhill North | 20 March 2008 | Conservative | Conservative |
| Risbygate | 15 November 2012 | Conservative | Green |
| Abbeygate | 2 May 2013 | Conservative | Conservative |
| Bardwell | 5 September 2013 | Conservative | Conservative |
| Abbeygate | 3 October 2013 | Conservative | Conservative |
| Haverhill East | 9 January 2014 | Conservative | UKIP |
| Haverhill North | 5 May 2016 | Conservative | UKIP |
| Moreton Hall | 15 December 2016 | Conservative | Independent |
| Chedburgh | 28 September 2017 | Conservative | Conservative |
| Hundon | 28 September 2017 | Conservative | Conservative |
| St Olaves | 12 April 2018 | Labour | Labour |
| Haverhill East | 3 May 2018 | Conservative | Conservative |
| Haverhill North | 3 May 2018 | Conservative | Conservative |
