= 1999 St Edmundsbury Borough Council election =

1999 English local government election

- 4 May 1999

44 seats to St Edmundsbury Borough Council 23 seats needed for a majority

	First party	Second party
Party	Conservative	Labour
Last election	14 seats, 33.2%	23 seats, 47.9%
Seats won	23	16
Seat change	▲9	▼7
Popular vote	13,769	12,438
Percentage	43.7%	39.5%
Swing	▲10.5%	▼8.4%
	Third party	Fourth party
Party	Independent	Liberal Democrats
Last election	3 seats, 7.7%	4 seats, 11.1%
Seats won	3	2
Seat change	Steady	▼2
Popular vote	2,363	2,923
Percentage	7.5%	9.3%
Swing	▼0.2%	▼1.8%
- Winner of each seat at the 1999 St Edmundsbury Borough Council election.
Council control before election
Labour Party
Council control after election
Conservative Party

The 1999 St. Edmundsbury Borough Council election took place on 4 May 1999 to elect members of St Edmundsbury Borough Council in England. This was on the same day as other local elections.

== Summary ==
=== Election result ===
1999 St Edmundsbury Borough Council election
Party	Candidates	Seats	Gains	Losses	Net gain/loss	Seats %	Votes %	Votes	+/−
Conservative	36	23	10	1	▲9	52.3	43.7	13,769	+10.5
Labour	36	16	2	9	▼7	36.4	39.5	12,438	–8.4
Independent	5	3	1	1	Steady	6.8	7.5	2,363	–0.2
Liberal Democrats	9	2	0	2	▼2	4.5	9.3	2,923	–1.8

== Ward results ==
Incumbent councillors standing for re-election are marked with an asterisk (*). Changes in seats do not take into account by-elections or defections.

=== Abbeygate ===
Abbeygate (2 seats)
Party	Candidate	Votes	%	±%
Conservative	B. Lockwood*	791	59.0	
Independent	M. Ames*	690	51.5	
Labour	D. Dawson	374	27.9	
Liberal Democrats	I. Norris	279	20.8	
Turnout		1,341	42.5	
Registered electors		3,156		
Conservative hold				
Independent hold				

=== Barningham ===
Barningham
Party	Candidate	Votes	%	±%
Conservative	J. Wallace*	Unopposed		
Registered electors		1,865		
Conservative hold				

=== Barrow ===
Barrow
Party	Candidate	Votes	%	±%
Conservative	M. Conroy	491	68.3	
Labour	W. Williams	228	31.7	
Majority		263	36.6	
Turnout		719	49.0	
Registered electors		1,474		
Conservative gain from Labour				

=== Cangle ===
Cangle (2 seats)
Party	Candidate	Votes	%	±%
Labour	G. Kiernan*	616	54.4	
Labour	P. French	557	49.2	
Conservative	S. Johnston	485	42.8	
Conservative	E. Macnaghten	449	39.6	
Turnout		1,133	27.6	
Registered electors		4,105		
Labour hold				
Labour hold				

=== Castle ===
Castle
Party	Candidate	Votes	%	±%
Labour	L. Kiernan*	534	56.9	
Conservative	A. Whittaker	404	43.1	
Majority		130	13.9	
Turnout		938	27.0	
Registered electors		3,460		
Labour hold				

=== Cavendish ===
Cavendish
Party	Candidate	Votes	%	±%
Conservative	J. Wayman*	Unopposed		
Registered electors		1,351		
Conservative hold				

=== Chalkstone ===
Chalkstone (2 seats)
Party	Candidate	Votes	%	±%
Labour	P. Hanlon	638	59.9	
Labour	M. Lee	637	59.8	
Conservative	J. Bridges	394	37.0	
Conservative	D. Ward	367	34.5	
Turnout		1,065	22.8	
Registered electors		4,670		
Labour gain from Liberal Democrats				
Labour gain from Liberal Democrats				

=== Chevington ===
Chevington
Party	Candidate	Votes	%	±%
Conservative	J. Hart*	487	69.8	
Labour	M. Searle	211	30.2	
Majority		276	39.5	
Turnout		698	43.0	
Registered electors		1,623		
Conservative hold				

=== Clare ===
Clare
Party	Candidate	Votes	%	±%
Conservative	J. Stevens	577	79.0	
Labour	R. Harrison	153	21.0	
Majority		424	58.1	
Turnout		730	43.0	
Registered electors		1,706		
Conservative gain from Independent				

=== Clements ===
Clements (2 seats)
Party	Candidate	Votes	%	±%
Labour	M. Martin*	295	74.9	
Labour	A. Smith*	280	71.1	
Conservative	R. Macauslan	83	21.1	
Conservative	P. Young	80	20.3	
Turnout		394	16.7	
Registered electors		2,360		
Labour hold				
Labour hold				

=== Eastgate ===
Eastgate (2 seats)
Party	Candidate	Votes	%	±%
Labour	T. Beckwith*	809	45.3	
Conservative	F. Warby	729	40.9	
Conservative	C. Mayson	641	35.9	
Labour	E. Zwandhal*	611	34.3	
Liberal Democrats	B. Wesley	219	12.3	
Independent	V. Powell	185	10.4	
Liberal Democrats	P. Gadbury	180	10.1	
Turnout		1,784	32.0	
Registered electors		5,575		
Labour hold				
Conservative gain from Labour				

=== Fornham ===
Fornham
Party	Candidate	Votes	%	±%
Conservative	M. Jones	479	58.8	
Labour	R. Cockle*	336	41.2	
Majority		143	17.5	
Turnout		815	35.2	
Registered electors		2,324		
Conservative gain from Labour				

=== Great Barton ===
Great Barton
Party	Candidate	Votes	%	±%
Conservative	M. Horbury*	566	81.4	
Labour	P. Fletcher	129	18.6	
Majority		437	62.9	
Turnout		695	39.6	
Registered electors		1,764		
Conservative hold				

=== Honington ===
Honington
Party	Candidate	Votes	%	±%
Conservative	R. Sutton*	338	71.2	
Labour	R. Howe	137	28.8	
Majority		201	42.3	
Turnout		475	40.2	
Registered electors		1,185		
Conservative hold				

=== Horringer ===
Horringer
Party	Candidate	Votes	%	±%
Independent	A. Biglin*	469	72.8	
Conservative	H. Ward	175	27.2	
Majority		294	45.7	
Turnout		644	52.8	
Registered electors		1,221		
Independent hold				

=== Horringer Court ===
Horringer Court
Party	Candidate	Votes	%	±%
Conservative	M. Milnes	337	43.5	
Labour	J. Higgins*	274	35.4	
Liberal Democrats	T. King	163	21.1	
Majority		63	8.1	
Turnout		774	41.5	
Registered electors		1,872		
Conservative gain from Labour				

=== Hundon ===
Hundon
Party	Candidate	Votes	%	±%
Conservative	M. Warwick*	473	71.1	
Labour	W. Gridley	192	28.9	
Majority		281	42.3	
Turnout		665	39.1	
Registered electors		1,710		
Conservative hold				

=== Ixworth ===
Ixworth
Party	Candidate	Votes	%	±%
Conservative	J. Griffiths*	Unopposed		
Registered electors		2,202		
Conservative hold				

=== Kedington ===
Kedington
Party	Candidate	Votes	%	±%
Conservative	A. Sutton	233	50.1	
Labour	K. Jenkins*	232	49.9	
Majority		1	0.2	
Turnout		465	32.9	
Registered electors		1,418		
Conservative gain from Labour				

=== Northgate ===
Northgate (2 seats)
Party	Candidate	Votes	%	±%
Labour	D. Lockwood*	483	70.2	
Labour	E. Steele*	430	62.5	
Conservative	E. Flack	196	28.5	
Turnout		688	30.6	
Registered electors		2,247		
Labour hold				
Labour hold				

=== Pakenham ===
Pakenham
Party	Candidate	Votes	%	±%
Conservative	V. White	306	54.5	
Liberal Democrats	L. Couper*	255	45.5	
Majority		51	9.1	
Turnout		561	41.0	
Registered electors		1,374		
Conservative gain from Labour				

=== Risby ===
Risby
Party	Candidate	Votes	%	±%
Conservative	H. Levack	452	66.5	
Labour	G. Keatley	228	33.5	
Majority		224	32.9	
Turnout		680	43.9	
Registered electors		1,554		
Conservative hold				

=== Risbygate ===
Risbygate (2 seats)
Party	Candidate	Votes	%	±%
Labour	M. Ereira-Guyer*	506	45.5	
Labour	R. O'Driscoll*	463	41.6	
Conservative	P. Hopfensperger	442	39.7	
Independent	D. Nettleton	426	38.3	
Turnout		1,113	41.7	
Registered electors		2,670		
Labour hold				
Labour hold				

=== Rougham ===
Rougham
Party	Candidate	Votes	%	±%
Conservative	S. Mildmay-White*	458	75.5	
Labour	A. Grenville	149	24.5	
Majority		309	50.9	
Turnout		607	45.2	
Registered electors		1,352		
Conservative hold				

=== Sextons ===
Sextons (2 seats)
Party	Candidate	Votes	%	±%
Labour	R. Nowak*	632	52.4	
Labour	C. Muge*	610	50.6	
Conservative	D. Speakman	584	48.4	
Turnout		1,206	43.7	
Registered electors		2,760		
Labour hold				
Labour hold				

=== Southgate ===
Southgate (2 seats)
Party	Candidate	Votes	%	±%
Liberal Democrats	B. Bagnall*	888	65.8	
Liberal Democrats	P. Dulieu	630	46.7	
Conservative	S. Craig	450	33.4	
Labour	P. Williams	293	21.7	
Turnout		1,349	41.2	
Registered electors		3,274		
Liberal Democrats hold				
Liberal Democrats hold				

=== St. Marys & Helions ===
St. Marys & Helions
Party	Candidate	Votes	%	±%
Conservative	J. Farthing	215	51.3	
Labour	E. Bowman	204	48.7	
Majority		11	2.6	
Turnout		419	30.9	
Registered electors		1,356		
Conservative gain from Labour				

=== St. Olaves ===
St. Olaves (2 seats)
Party	Candidate	Votes	%	±%
Labour	W. Cownley*	Unopposed		
Labour	S. Wormleighton*	Unopposed		
Registered electors		2,843		
Labour hold				
Labour hold				

=== Stanton ===
Stanton
Party	Candidate	Votes	%	±%
Conservative	J. Thorndyke*	Unopposed		
Registered electors		2,288		
Conservative gain from Labour				

=== Westgate ===
Westgate (2 seats)
Party	Candidate	Votes	%	±%
Conservative	M. Brundle*	556	50.0	
Conservative	A. Varley	483	43.5	
Labour	L. Button*	410	36.9	
Labour	R. Corfe	355	32.0	
Liberal Democrats	G. Elliot	159	14.3	
Liberal Democrats	M. Tilley	150	13.5	
Turnout		1,111	40.3	
Registered electors		2,757		
Conservative hold				
Conservative gain from Labour				

=== Whelnetham ===
Whelnetham
Party	Candidate	Votes	%	±%
Independent	T. Clements*	593	82.9	
Labour	E. Kilner	122	17.1	
Majority		471	65.9	
Turnout		715	44.2	
Registered electors		1,633		
Independent gain from Conservative				

=== Wickhambrook ===
Wickhambrook
Party	Candidate	Votes	%	±%
Conservative	D. Redhead*	629	80.1	
Labour	R. Isaacs	156	19.9	
Majority		473	60.3	
Turnout		785	47.6	
Registered electors		1,659		
Conservative hold				

=== Withersfield ===
Withersfield
Party	Candidate	Votes	%	±%
Conservative	R. Clifton-Brown*	419	73.1	
Labour	L. Hancock	154	26.9	
Majority		265	46.2	
Turnout		573	40.0	
Registered electors		1,428		
Conservative hold				
