= 2003 St Edmundsbury Borough Council election =

2003 English local government election

- 3 May 2003

All 45 seats to St Edmundsbury Borough Council 23 seats needed for a majority

	First party	Second party
Party	Conservative	Labour
Seats won	28	12
Seat change	▲5	▼4
Popular vote	16,060	11,909
Percentage	47.8%	35.5%
Swing	▲4.1%	▼4.0%
	Third party	Fourth party
Party	Independent	Liberal Democrats
Seats won	3	2
Seat change	Steady	Steady
Popular vote	2,948	2,494
Percentage	8.8%	7.4%
Swing	▲1.3%	▼1.9%
- Winner of each seat at the 2003 St Edmundsbury Borough Council election.
Control before election
Conservative
Control after election
Conservative

The 2003 St Edmundsbury Borough Council election took place on 1 May 2003 to elect members of St Edmundsbury Borough Council in England. This was on the same day as other local elections.

The whole council was up for election on new ward boundaries. The number of seats increased by 1.

== Summary ==
=== Election result ===
2003 St Edmundsbury Borough Council election
Party	Candidates	Seats	Gains	Losses	Net gain/loss	Seats %	Votes %	Votes	+/−
Conservative	42	28	N/A	N/A	▲5	62.2	47.8	16,060	+4.1
Labour	24	12	N/A	N/A	▼4	26.7	35.5	11,909	–4.0
Independent	7	3	N/A	N/A	Steady	6.7	8.8	2,948	+1.3
Liberal Democrats	5	2	N/A	N/A	Steady	4.4	7.4	2,494	–1.9
UKIP	1	0	N/A	N/A	Steady	0.0	0.5	180	N/A

== Ward results ==
Incumbent councillors standing for re-election are marked with an asterisk (*). Changes in seats do not take into account by-elections or defections.

=== Abbeygate ===
Abbeygate (2 seats)
Party	Candidate	Votes	%	±%
Conservative	Paul Farmer	982	62.8	
Independent	Michael Ames*	666	42.6	
Independent	Brian Lockwood*	386	24.7	
Turnout		~1,563	45.3	
Registered electors		3,451		
Conservative hold				
Independent hold				

=== Bardwell ===
Bardwell
Party	Candidate	Votes	%
Conservative	John Hale	485	72.9
UKIP	James Lumley	180	27.1
Majority		305	45.8
Turnout		665	36.9
Registered electors		1,789	
Conservative win (new seat)			

=== Barningham ===
Barningham
Party	Candidate	Votes	%	±%
Conservative	James Simmons	Unopposed		
Registered electors		2,022		
Conservative hold				

=== Barrow ===
Barrow
Party	Candidate	Votes	%	±%
Conservative	Ian Houler	Unopposed		
Registered electors		1,729		
Conservative hold				

=== Cavendish ===
Cavendish
Party	Candidate	Votes	%	±%
Conservative	Peter Stevens	Unopposed		
Registered electors		1,509		
Conservative hold				

=== Chedburgh ===
Chedburgh
Party	Candidate	Votes	%
Conservative	Nigel Aitkens	Unopposed	
Registered electors		1,757	
Conservative win (new seat)			

=== Clare ===
Clare
Party	Candidate	Votes	%	±%
Conservative	Jeffrey Stevens*	Unopposed		
Registered electors		1,653		
Conservative hold				

=== Eastgate ===
Eastgate
Party	Candidate	Votes	%	±%
Conservative	Patricia Warby	383	56.9	
Labour	Leslie Button	290	43.1	
Majority		93	13.8	
Turnout		673	42.0	
Registered electors		1,664		
Conservative gain from Labour				

=== Fornham ===
Fornham
Party	Candidate	Votes	%	±%
Conservative	Michael Jones*	Unopposed		
Registered electors		1,695		
Conservative hold				

=== Great Barton ===
Great Barton
Party	Candidate	Votes	%	±%
Conservative	Margaret Horbury*	Unopposed		
Registered electors		1,752		
Conservative hold				

=== Haverhill East ===
Haverhill East (3 seats)
Party	Candidate	Votes	%
Labour	Ernest Goody	639	45.1
Labour	Patrick Hanlon*	603	42.5
Labour	Susan Howard	601	42.4
Conservative	Gordon Cox	597	42.1
Conservative	Janet Johnson	586	41.3
Conservative	David Rosen	525	37.0
Turnout		~1,419	28.2
Registered electors		5,033	
Labour win (new seat)			
Labour win (new seat)			
Labour win (new seat)			

=== Haverhill North ===
Haverhill North (3 seats)
Party	Candidate	Votes	%
Labour	Gerry Kiernan*	859	52.4
Labour	Ann Thomas	717	43.7
Labour	Phillip French*	689	42.0
Conservative	Timothy Marks	668	40.7
Conservative	John Harris	649	39.6
Conservative	Edgar Morton	599	36.5
Turnout		~1,640	33.5
Registered electors		4,895	
Labour win (new seat)			
Labour win (new seat)			
Labour win (new seat)			

=== Haverhill South ===
Haverhill South (2 seats)
Party	Candidate	Votes	%
Labour	Mary Martin	472	50.0
Labour	Maggie Lee*	461	48.8
Conservative	Dorothy Whittaker	264	28.0
Conservative	Pippa Farthing	263	27.9
Turnout		~944	26.3
Registered electors		3,591	
Labour win (new seat)			
Labour win (new seat)			

=== Haverhill West ===
Haverhill West (2 seats)
Party	Candidate	Votes	%
Conservative	Adam Whittaker	591	57.8
Conservative	Jeremy Farthing*	522	51.0
Labour	Julie Jupp	400	39.1
Labour	Lynne Brixius	359	35.1
Turnout		~1,023	27.7
Registered electors		3,693	
Conservative win (new seat)			
Conservative win (new seat)			

=== Horringer & Whelnetham ===
Horringer & Whelnetham
Party	Candidate	Votes	%
Conservative	Terence Clements	429	50.3
Independent	Bert Biglin*	424	49.7
Majority		5	0.6
Turnout		853	51.9
Registered electors		1,695	
Conservative win (new seat)			

=== Hundon ===
Hundon
Party	Candidate	Votes	%	±%
Conservative	Margaret Warwick*	Unopposed		
Registered electors		1,696		
Conservative hold				

=== Ixworth ===
Ixworth
Party	Candidate	Votes	%	±%
Conservative	John Griffiths*	Unopposed		
Registered electors		1,620		
Conservative hold				

=== Kedington ===
Kedington
Party	Candidate	Votes	%	±%
Conservative	Geoffrey Rushbrooke	423	62.9	
Labour	Alan Pearson	250	37.1	
Majority		173	25.8	
Turnout		673	42.3	
Registered electors		1,592		
Conservative hold				

=== Minden ===
Minden (2 seats)
Party	Candidate	Votes	%
Conservative	Margaret Charlesworth	718	49.3
Conservative	Derek Speakman	665	45.7
Labour	Ray Nowak*	663	45.5
Labour	Colin Muge*	613	42.1
Turnout		~1,456	40.3
Registered electors		3,612	
Conservative win (new seat)			
Conservative win (new seat)			

=== Moreton Hall ===
Moreton Hall (3 seats)
Party	Candidate	Votes	%
Conservative	Terence Buckle	868	59.7
Conservative	Francis Warby*	861	59.3
Labour	Trevor Beckwith*	624	43.0
Labour	Anthony Jones	439	30.2
Labour	Elle Zwandahl	391	26.9
Turnout		~1,453	38.0
Registered electors		3,824	
Conservative win (new seat)			
Conservative win (new seat)			
Labour win (new seat)			

=== Northgate ===
Northgate
Party	Candidate	Votes	%	±%
Labour	David Lockwood*	364	55.6	
Independent	Richard Mortlock	153	23.4	
Conservative	Eric Flack	107	16.3	
Majority		211	32.2	
Turnout		655	35.7	
Registered electors		1,834		
Labour hold				

=== Pakenham ===
Pakenham
Party	Candidate	Votes	%	±%
Conservative	Christopher Spicer	423	64.3	
Liberal Democrats	David Chappell	214	32.5	
Majority		209	31.8	
Turnout		658	40.0	
Registered electors		1,645		
Conservative hold				

=== Risby ===
Risby
Party	Candidate	Votes	%	±%
Conservative	Helen Levack*	Unopposed		
Registered electors		1,957		
Conservative hold				

=== Risbygate ===
Risbygate (2 seats)
Party	Candidate	Votes	%	±%
Independent	David Nettleton	617	52.1	
Conservative	Robert Everitt	478	40.4	
Labour	Mark Ereira-Guyer*	440	37.1	
Labour	Jennifer Hart	279	23.6	
Turnout		~1,185	38.1	
Registered electors		3,109		
Independent gain from Labour				
Conservative gain from Labour				

=== Rougham ===
Rougham
Party	Candidate	Votes	%	±%
Conservative	Sara Mildmay-White*	550	77.0	
Labour	Adrian Grenville	164	23.0	
Majority		386	54.0	
Turnout		714	41.1	
Registered electors		1,789		
Conservative hold				

=== Southgate ===
Southgate (2 seats)
Party	Candidate	Votes	%	±%
Liberal Democrats	Allan Jones	804	50.1	
Liberal Democrats	David Bradbury	748	46.6	
Conservative	Paul Hopfensperger	744	46.3	
Conservative	Martin Milnes*	681	42.4	
Turnout		~1,606	47.3	
Registered electors		3,395		
Liberal Democrats hold				
Liberal Democrats hold				

=== St. Olaves ===
St. Olaves (2 seats)
Party	Candidate	Votes	%	±%
Labour	Sheila Wormleighton*	662	62.5	
Labour	Robert Cockle	608	57.4	
Conservative	George Cockram	286	27.0	
Conservative	Hugh Forster	253	23.9	
Turnout		~1,060	30.8	
Registered electors		3,441		
Labour hold				
Labour hold				

=== Stanton ===
Stanton
Party	Candidate	Votes	%	±%
Conservative	Jim Thorndyke*	Unopposed		
Registered electors		1,919		
Conservative hold				

=== Westgate ===
Westgate (2 seats)
Party	Candidate	Votes	%	±%
Conservative	Andrew Varley*	633	43.1	
Conservative	Stefan Oliver	549	37.4	
Liberal Democrats	Gerry Taylor	412	28.1	
Labour	Robert Corfe	322	22.0	
Liberal Democrats	Desmond Astley-Cooper	316	21.5	
Independent	Roger Waters	307	20.9	
Turnout		~1,467	43.0	
Registered electors		3,411		
Conservative hold				
Conservative hold				

=== Wickhambrook ===
Wickhambrook
Party	Candidate	Votes	%	±%
Independent	Derek Redhead*	395	58.0	
Conservative	Alexander Bridges	278	40.8	
Majority		117	17.2	
Turnout		681	41.5	
Registered electors		1,642		
Independent gain from Conservative				

=== Withersfield ===
Withersfield
Party	Candidate	Votes	%	±%
Conservative	Robert Clifton-Brown*	Unopposed		
Registered electors		1,752		
Conservative hold				

== By-elections ==
=== Risbygate ===
Risbygate by-election: 20 May 2004
Party	Candidate	Votes	%	±%
Independent		293	34.1	
Conservative		278	32.3	
Labour		169	19.7	
Green		85	9.9	
Independent		35	4.1	
Majority		15	1.7	
Turnout		860	26.7	
Registered electors		3,221		
Independent gain from Conservative		Swing		

=== Haverhill East ===
Haverhill East by-election: 10 June 2004
Party	Candidate	Votes	%	±%
Conservative		520	35.9	
Independent		376	26.0	
Labour		363	25.1	
Liberal Democrats		189	13.1	
Majority		144	9.9	
Turnout		1,448	28.3	
Registered electors		5,117		
Conservative gain from Labour		Swing		

=== Barningham ===
Barningham by-election: 9 September 2004
Party	Candidate	Votes	%	±%
Conservative		Unopposed		
Registered electors		2,022		
Conservative hold				

=== Risby ===
Risby
Party	Candidate	Votes	%	±%
Conservative		394	57.7	
Liberal Democrats		289	42.3	
Majority		105	15.4	
Turnout		683	20.7	
Registered electors		3,300		
Conservative gain from Labour		Swing		

=== Haverhill South ===
Haverhill South by-election: 5 May 2005
Party	Candidate	Votes	%	±%
Labour		746	43.8	
Conservative		602	35.3	
Liberal Democrats		357	20.9	
Majority		144	8.4	
Turnout		1,705	46.6	
Registered electors		3,659		
Labour hold		Swing		

=== Westgate ===
Westgate by-election: 16 February 2006
Party	Candidate	Votes	%	±%
Conservative		500	54.1	
Liberal Democrats		311	33.6	
Green		64	6.9	
UKIP		50	5.4	
Majority		189	20.4	
Turnout		925	27.4	
Registered electors		3,376		
Conservative hold		Swing		

=== Kedington ===
Kedington by-election: 15 June 2006
Party	Candidate	Votes	%	±%
Conservative		350	53.8	
Liberal Democrats		250	38.4	
Labour		51	7.8	
Majority		100	15.4	
Turnout		651	43.0	
Registered electors		1,514		
Conservative hold		Swing		
