= 1995 St Edmundsbury Borough Council election =

1995 English local government election

- 4 May 1995

44 seats to St Edmundsbury Borough Council 23 seats needed for a majority

	First party	Second party
Party	Labour	Conservative
Seats won	23	14
Seat change	▲12	▼6
Popular vote	17,942	12,458
Percentage	47.9%	33.2%
Swing	▲11.1%	▼1.9
	Third party	Fourth party
Party	Liberal Democrats	Independent
Seats won	4	3
Seat change	▼1	▼5
Popular vote	4,170	2,901
Percentage	11.1%	7.7%
Swing	▼4.2%	▼3.2%
- Winner of each seat at the 1995 St Edmundsbury Borough Council election.
Control before election
No overall control
Control after election
Labour

The 1995 St. Edmundsbury Borough Council election took place on 4 May 1995 to elect members of St Edmundsbury Borough Council in England. This was on the same day as other local elections.

== Summary ==
=== Election result ===
1995 St Edmundsbury Borough Council election
Party	Candidates	Seats	Gains	Losses	Net gain/loss	Seats %	Votes %	Votes	+/−
Labour	38	23	12	0	▲12	52.3	47.9	17,942	+11.1
Conservative	37	14	3	9	▼6	31.8	33.2	12,458	–1.9
Liberal Democrats	8	4	0	1	▼1	11.4	11.1	4,170	–4.2
Independent	10	3	2	7	▼5	4.5	7.7	2,901	–3.2

2 Conservatives and 2 Labour were elected unopposed.

== Ward results ==
Incumbent councillors standing for re-election are marked with an asterisk (*). Changes in seats do not take into account by-elections or defections.

=== Abbeygate ===
Abbeygate (2 seats)
Party	Candidate	Votes	%	±%
Independent	M. Ames*	661	42.1	
Conservative	B. Lockwood	457	29.1	
Labour	R. Croly	452	28.8	
Conservative	F. Jepson*	449	28.6	
Independent	D. Norman	228	14.5	
Turnout		~1,570	44.0	
Registered electors		2,911		
Independent hold				
Conservative hold				

=== Barningham ===
Barningham
Party	Candidate	Votes	%	±%
Conservative	J. Wallace*	539	65.2	
Labour	I. Wooler	288	34.8	
Majority		251	30.4	
Turnout		827	46.8	
Registered electors		1,775		
Conservative hold				

=== Barrow ===
Barrow
Party	Candidate	Votes	%	±%
Labour	J. Jolly	367	52.1	
Conservative	P. English*	338	47.9	
Majority		29	4.1	
Turnout		705	47.8	
Registered electors		1,478		
Labour gain from Independent				

=== Cangle ===
Cangle (2 seats)
Party	Candidate	Votes	%	±%
Labour	L. Kiernan*	994	73.4	
Labour	J. Hartley*	923	68.2	
Conservative	M. Richards	361	26.6	
Turnout		~1,355	27.5	
Registered electors		4,177		
Labour hold				
Labour hold				

=== Castle ===
Castle
Party	Candidate	Votes	%	±%
Labour	L. Kiernan	602	85.3	
Conservative	T. Phillips	104	14.7	
Majority		498	70.5	
Turnout		706	29.0	
Registered electors		2,427		
Labour hold				

=== Cavendish ===
Cavendish
Party	Candidate	Votes	%	±%
Conservative	J. Wayman*	Unopposed		
Registered electors		1,358		
Conservative hold				

=== Chalkstone ===
Chalkstone (2 seats)
Party	Candidate	Votes	%	±%
Liberal Democrats	C. Jones*	894	55.7	
Liberal Democrats	J. Jones*	653	40.7	
Labour	E. Percy	537	33.5	
Conservative	M. Strike	174	10.8	
Turnout		~1,605	25.5	
Registered electors		4,426		
Liberal Democrats hold				
Liberal Democrats hold				

=== Chevington ===
Chevington
Party	Candidate	Votes	%	±%
Conservative	J. Hart	395	56.8	
Labour	P. Bridge	301	43.2	
Majority		94	13.5	
Turnout		696	47.0	
Registered electors		1,510		
Conservative hold				

=== Clare ===
Clare
Party	Candidate	Votes	%	±%
Independent	R. Warmington	414	51.0	
Conservative	J. Stevens	397	49.0	
Majority		17	2.1	
Turnout		811	50.0	
Registered electors		1,619		
Independent gain from Conservative				

=== Clements ===
Clements (2 seats)
Party	Candidate	Votes	%	±%
Labour	M. Martin*	Unopposed		
Labour	M. O'Neill*	Unopposed		
Registered electors		2,495		
Labour hold				
Labour hold				

=== Eastgate ===
Eastgate (2 seats)
Party	Candidate	Votes	%	±%
Labour	T. Beckwith	825	45.6	
Labour	D. Sharpe	760	42.0	
Conservative	E. Mortimer	651	36.0	
Conservative	I. Speakman*	635	35.1	
Independent	H. Godfrey*	332	18.4	
Turnout		~1,809	36.0	
Registered electors		4,853		
Labour gain from Conservative				
Labour gain from Conservative				

=== Fornham ===
Fornham
Party	Candidate	Votes	%	±%
Labour	R. Cockle	511	51.1	
Conservative	M. Jones	489	48.9	
Majority		22	2.2	
Turnout		1,000	42.5	
Registered electors		2,367		
Labour gain from Conservative				

=== Great Barton ===
Great Barton
Party	Candidate	Votes	%	±%
Conservative	M. Horbury*	471	67.3	
Labour	R. Muge	229	32.7	
Majority		242	34.6	
Turnout		700	41.7	
Registered electors		1,690		
Conservative hold				

=== Honington ===
Honington
Party	Candidate	Votes	%	±%
Conservative	R. Sutton	279	53.7	
Labour	D. Pollard	241	46.3	
Majority		38	7.3	
Turnout		520	44.0	
Registered electors		1,198		
Conservative gain from Independent				

=== Horringer ===
Horringer
Party	Candidate	Votes	%	±%
Independent	A. Biglin	418	58.7	
Conservative	J. Shipston	192	27.0	
Labour	H. Wright	102	14.3	
Majority		226	31.7	
Turnout		712	60.3	
Registered electors		1,180		
Independent gain from Conservative				

=== Horringer Court ===
Horringer Court
Party	Candidate	Votes	%	±%
Labour	J. Higgins	511	66.5	
Conservative	J. Easdown	257	33.5	
Majority		254	33.1	
Turnout		768	42.0	
Registered electors		1,840		
Labour gain from Liberal Democrats				

=== Hundon ===
Hundon
Party	Candidate	Votes	%	±%
Conservative	M. Warwick*	454	51.5	
Labour	D. Sparks	427	48.5	
Majority		27	3.1	
Turnout		881	52.8	
Registered electors		1,676		
Conservative hold				

=== Ixworth ===
Ixworth
Party	Candidate	Votes	%	±%
Conservative	F. Robinson*	316	36.1	
Liberal Democrats	N. Amor	300	34.3	
Labour	M. De Koning- Spooner	259	29.6	
Majority		16	1.8	
Turnout		875	40.1	
Registered electors		2,189		
Conservative hold				

=== Kedington ===
Kedington
Party	Candidate	Votes	%	±%
Labour	P. Denning	216	45.5	
Independent	A. Childerhouse	149	31.4	
Conservative	S. Hayward	110	23.2	
Majority		67	14.1	
Turnout		475	33.6	
Registered electors		1,416		
Labour hold				

=== Northgate ===
Northgate (2 seats)
Party	Candidate	Votes	%	±%
Labour	D. Lockwood*	778	84.7	
Labour	E. Steel*	704	76.7	
Conservative	R. Simpson	141	15.3	
Conservative	A. Cowper	124	13.5	
Turnout		~918	40.0	
Registered electors		2,315		
Labour hold				
Labour hold				

=== Pakenham ===
Pakenham
Party	Candidate	Votes	%	±%
Labour	M. Bartram	315	53.6	
Independent	J. Pereira*	273	46.4	
Majority		42	7.1	
Turnout		588	40.6	
Registered electors		1,466		
Labour gain from Independent				

=== Risby ===
Risby
Party	Candidate	Votes	%	±%
Conservative	K. Fisher*	434	58.4	
Labour	R. Bridge	309	41.6	
Majority		125	16.8	
Turnout		743	48.0	
Registered electors		1,570		
Conservative hold				

=== Risbygate ===
Risbygate (2 seats)
Party	Candidate	Votes	%	±%
Labour	R. O'Driscoll*	733	65.6	
Labour	M. Ereira-Guyer	698	62.5	
Conservative	E. Spooner*	384	34.4	
Conservative	A. Biggs	335	30.0	
Turnout		~1,117	42.0	
Registered electors		2,750		
Labour hold				
Labour gain from Conservative				

=== Rougham ===
Rougham
Party	Candidate	Votes	%	±%
Conservative	S. Mildmay-White	276	43.7	
Independent	T. May*	222	35.2	
Labour	A. Grenville	133	21.1	
Majority		54	8.6	
Turnout		631	47.0	
Registered electors		1,358		
Conservative gain from Independent				

=== Sextons ===
Sextons (2 seats)
Party	Candidate	Votes	%	±%
Labour	R. Nowak	814	60.2	
Labour	C. Muge	776	57.4	
Conservative	P. Underwood*	539	39.8	
Conservative	D. Speakman*	535	39.5	
Turnout		~1,353	49.0	
Registered electors		2,853		
Labour gain from Conservative				
Labour gain from Conservative				

=== Southgate ===
Southgate (2 seats)
Party	Candidate	Votes	%	±%
Liberal Democrats	B. Bagnall*	943	54.5	
Liberal Democrats	J. Williams*	884	51.1	
Labour	M. Benwell	449	26.0	
Conservative	C. Gardner	338	19.5	
Turnout		~1,731	44.0	
Registered electors		3,575		
Liberal Democrats hold				
Liberal Democrats hold				

=== St. Marys & Helions ===
St. Marys & Helions
Party	Candidate	Votes	%	±%
Labour	G. Hatchell	238	51.7	
Conservative	A. Horrigan*	156	33.9	
Independent	P. O'Garvaigh	66	14.3	
Majority		82	17.8	
Turnout		460	36.0	
Registered electors		1,297		
Labour gain from Conservative				

=== St. Olaves ===
St. Olaves (2 seats)
Party	Candidate	Votes	%	±%
Labour	S. Wormleighton*	763	85.5	
Labour	W. Cownley*	724	81.2	
Conservative	A. Williams	129	14.5	
Turnout		~892	35.0	
Registered electors		2,868		
Labour hold				
Labour hold				

=== Stanton ===
Stanton
Party	Candidate	Votes	%	±%
Labour	J. Moore	363	37.3	
Conservative	P. Rudge*	323	33.2	
Liberal Democrats	T. Cook	149	15.3	
Independent	J. Thorndyke	138	14.2	
Majority		40	4.1	
Turnout		973	45.0	
Registered electors		2,168		
Labour gain from Conservative				

=== Westgate ===
Westgate (2 seats)
Party	Candidate	Votes	%	±%
Labour	L. Button	516	43.1	
Conservative	M. Brundle*	507	42.4	
Conservative	F. Warby	472	39.4	
Labour	P. Smithers	454	37.9	
Liberal Democrats	P. Gadbury	174	14.5	
Liberal Democrats	P. Dulieu	173	14.5	
Turnout		~1,197	43.0	
Registered electors		2,836		
Labour gain from Independent				
Conservative hold				

=== Whelnetham ===
Whelnetham
Party	Candidate	Votes	%	±%
Conservative	T. Clements*	357	50.4	
Labour	E. Kilner	352	49.6	
Majority		5	0.7	
Turnout		709	43.0	
Registered electors		1,639		
Conservative hold				

=== Wickhambrook ===
Wickhambrook
Party	Candidate	Votes	%	±%
Conservative	D. Redhead	Unopposed		
Registered electors		1,650		
Conservative gain from Independent				

=== Withersfield ===
Withersfield
Party	Candidate	Votes	%	±%
Conservative	R. Clifton-Brown*	340	55.0	
Labour	E. Elkins	278	45.0	
Majority		62	10.0	
Turnout		618	46.6	
Registered electors		1,332		
Conservative hold				
