= 1976 St Edmundsbury Borough Council election =

1976 English local government election

- 6 May 1976

All 44 seats to St Edmundsbury Borough Council 23 seats needed for a majority

	First party	Second party
Party	Conservative	Labour
Seats won	30	9
Seat change	▲4	▼2
Popular vote	9,817	7,269
Percentage	47.9%	35.5%
Swing	▲4.7%	▼4.1%
	Third party	Fourth party
Party	Independent	Ind. Conservative
Seats won	5	0
Seat change	▼1	▼1
Popular vote	2,158	did not stand
Percentage	10.5%	did not stand
Swing	▼0.2%	▼1.7%
Council control before election
Conservative
Council control after election
Conservative

The 1976 St Edmundsbury Borough Council election took place on 6 May 1976 to elect members of St Edmundsbury Borough Council in Suffolk, England. This was on the same day as other local elections.

== Summary ==
=== Election result ===
1976 St Edmundsbury Borough Council election
Party	Candidates	Seats	Gains	Losses	Net gain/loss	Seats %	Votes %	Votes	+/−
Conservative	28	30	4	0	▲4	68.2	47.9	9,817	+4.7
Labour	20	9	0	2	▼2	20.5	35.5	7,269	–4.1
Independent	11	5	0	1	▼1	11.4	10.5	2,158	–0.2
Liberal	5	0	0	0	Steady	0.0	5.4	1,115	+0.5
Ind. Socialist	1	0	0	0	Steady	0.0	0.6	131	N/A
Ind. Conservative	0	0	0	1	▼1	0.0	N/A	N/A	–1.7

11 Conservatives and 4 Independents were elected unopposed.

== Ward results ==
Incumbent councillors standing for re-election are marked with an asterisk (*). Changes in seats do not take into account by-elections or defections.

=== Barningham ===
Barningham
Party	Candidate	Votes	%	±%
Conservative	C. Hatten*	Unopposed		
Registered electors		1,324		
Conservative hold				

=== Barrow ===
Barrow
Party	Candidate	Votes	%	±%
Conservative	P. English*	Unopposed		
Registered electors		1,397		
Conservative hold				

=== Bury St Edmunds: Abbeygate ===
This result was missing from the source document.

=== Bury St. Edmunds: Eastgate ===
Bury St. Edmunds: Eastgate (2 seats)
Party	Candidate	Votes	%	±%
Conservative	B. Jennings*	589	50.5	
Conservative	R. Self*	588	50.4	
Liberal	F. Gane	304	26.0	
Labour	R. Nowak	274	23.5	
Liberal	J. Williams	188	16.1	
Turnout		~1,135	57.2	
Registered electors		1,984		
Conservative hold				
Conservative hold				

=== Bury St. Edmunds: Northgate ===
Bury St. Edmunds: Northgate (2 seats)
Party	Candidate	Votes	%	±%
Labour	E. Steele*	576	40.8	
Conservative	E. Spooner*	561	39.8	
Labour	R. Impey	374	26.5	
Independent	F. Baxter	274	19.4	
Turnout		~1,227	45.1	
Registered electors		2,721		
Labour hold				
Conservative hold				

=== Bury St. Edmunds: Risbygate ===
Bury St. Edmunds: Risbygate (2 seats)
Party	Candidate	Votes	%	±%
Conservative	H. Marsh*	Unopposed		
Conservative	A. Davies*	Unopposed		
Registered electors		2,021		
Conservative gain from Ind. Conservative				
Conservative hold				

=== Bury St. Edmunds: Sextons ===
Bury St. Edmunds: Sextons (2 seats)
Party	Candidate	Votes	%	±%
Conservative	J. Knight*	848	68.1	
Conservative	M. Lacey	746	59.9	
Labour	A. Bumpstead	397	31.9	
Turnout		~1,232	51.4	
Registered electors		2,397		
Conservative hold				
Conservative hold				

=== Bury St. Edmunds: Southgate ===
Bury St. Edmunds: Southgate (2 seats)
Party	Candidate	Votes	%	±%
Conservative	R. Elliott*	723	54.9	
Conservative	L. Sewell*	722	54.8	
Independent	F. Harley	595	45.1	
Turnout		~1,308	39.1	
Registered electors		3,345		
Conservative hold				
Conservative hold				

=== Bury St. Edmunds: St. Olaves ===
Bury St. Edmunds: St. Olaves (2 seats)
Party	Candidate	Votes	%	±%
Labour	S. Wormleighton*	500	54.7	
Labour	W. Cownley	394	43.1	
Conservative	W. Hawes	283	31.0	
Ind. Socialist	A. Miller	131	14.3	
Turnout		~922	35.0	
Registered electors		2,635		
Labour hold				
Labour hold				

=== Bury St. Edmunds: Westgate ===
Bury St. Edmunds: Westgate (2 seats)
Party	Candidate	Votes	%	±%
Conservative	R. Crickitt*	905	79.9	
Conservative	W. Cutting*	824	72.8	
Labour	S. Morgan	228	20.1	
Turnout		~1,133	47.5	
Registered electors		2,480		
Conservative hold				
Conservative hold				

=== Cavendish ===
Cavendish
Party	Candidate	Votes	%	±%
Independent	K. Rabett*	Unopposed		
Registered electors		1,251		
Independent hold				

=== Chevington ===
Chevington
Party	Candidate	Votes	%	±%
Conservative	J. Roberts*	Unopposed		
Registered electors		1,349		
Conservative hold				

=== Clare ===
Clare
Party	Candidate	Votes	%	±%
Independent	E. Soulsby*	Unopposed		
Registered electors		1,323		
Independent hold				

=== Fornham ===
Fornham
Party	Candidate	Votes	%	±%
Conservative	J. Warren*	Unopposed		
Registered electors		1,432		
Conservative hold				

=== Great Barton ===
Great Barton
Party	Candidate	Votes	%	±%
Conservative	C. Winsor*	Unopposed		
Registered electors		1,224		
Conservative hold				

=== Haverhill: Cangle ===
Haverhill: Cangle (2 seats)
Party	Candidate	Votes	%	±%
Labour	B. Esteal	628	38.7	
Conservative	J. Savage	611	37.7	
Labour	K. Poltock	574	35.4	
Liberal	R. Lifshack	382	23.6	
Turnout		~1,480	36.6	
Registered electors		4,044		
Labour hold				
Conservative gain from Labour				

=== Haverhill: Castle ===
Haverhill: Castle (2 seats)
Party	Candidate	Votes	%	±%
Labour	W. Elkins*	321	68.2	
Labour	J. Hartley*	302	64.1	
Liberal	J. Collis	150	31.8	
Turnout		~520	27.5	
Registered electors		1,891		
Labour hold				
Labour hold				

=== Haverhill: Clements ===
Haverhill: Clements (2 seats)
Party	Candidate	Votes	%	±%
Labour	H. Eves	451	64.2	
Labour	M. Perry	449	64.0	
Independent	N. Kells	161	22.9	
Liberal	M. Beith	91	13.0	
Turnout		~721	34.5	
Registered electors		2,089		
Labour hold				
Labour hold				

=== Haverhill: St. Marys & Helions ===
Haverhill: St. Marys & Helions (2 seats)
Party	Candidate	Votes	%	±%
Independent	W. Blake*	576	68.8	
Labour	E. Elkins*	261	31.2	
Labour	D. Hartley	174	20.8	
Turnout		~796	39.6	
Registered electors		2,009		
Independent hold				
Labour hold				

=== Honington ===
Honington
Party	Candidate	Votes	%	±%
Conservative	G. Starling*	388	65.9	
Labour	J. Cooper	201	34.1	
Majority		187	31.8	
Turnout		589	51.4	
Registered electors		1,153		
Conservative hold		Swing		

=== Horringer ===
Horringer
Party	Candidate	Votes	%	±%
Conservative	V. Roth*	Unopposed		
Registered electors		1,827		
Conservative hold				

=== Hundon ===
Hundon
Party	Candidate	Votes	%	±%
Conservative	K. Williams	311	52.6	
Independent	K. Wilkin	222	37.6	
Independent	P. O'Garvaigh	58	9.8	
Majority		89	15.0	
Turnout		591	50.7	
Registered electors		1,167		
Conservative hold		Swing		

=== Ixworth ===
Ixworth
Party	Candidate	Votes	%	±%
Conservative	D. Cross*	382	67.6	
Labour	P. Jenkins	183	32.4	
Majority		199	35.2	
Turnout		565	59.2	
Registered electors		954		
Conservative hold		Swing		

=== Kedington ===
Kedington
Party	Candidate	Votes	%	±%
Conservative	A. Kiddy*	368	52.7	
Labour	R. Messer	330	47.3	
Majority		38	5.4	
Turnout		698	56.8	
Registered electors		1,230		
Conservative hold		Swing		

=== Pakenham ===
Pakenham
Party	Candidate	Votes	%	±%
Independent	N. Whitwell*	Unopposed		
Registered electors		867		
Independent hold				

=== Risby ===
Risby
Party	Candidate	Votes	%	±%
Conservative	W. Conran*	Unopposed		
Registered electors		1,262		
Conservative hold				

=== Rougham ===
Rougham
Party	Candidate	Votes	%	±%
Independent	T. May*	Unopposed		
Registered electors		1,373		
Independent hold				

=== Stanton ===
Stanton
Party	Candidate	Votes	%	±%
Conservative	P. Rudge	518	54.8	
Labour	A. Jones*	427	45.2	
Majority		91	9.6	
Turnout		945	66.0	
Registered electors		1,445		
Conservative gain from Labour		Swing		

=== Troston ===
Troston
Party	Candidate	Votes	%	±%
Conservative	A. Ruffles	Unopposed		
Registered electors		1,134		
Conservative hold				

=== Whelnetham ===
Whelnetham
Party	Candidate	Votes	%	±%
Conservative	K. Green*	434	65.9	
Labour	N. Plumb	225	34.1	
Majority		209	31.8	
Turnout		659	48.5	
Registered electors		1,368		
Conservative hold		Swing		

=== Wickhambrook ===
Wickhambrook
Party	Candidate	Votes	%	±%
Conservative	J. Long	404	59.8	
Independent	A. Hicks	272	40.2	
Majority		132	19.6	
Turnout		676	48.4	
Registered electors		1,411		
Conservative gain from Independent		Swing		

=== Withersfield ===
Withersfield
Party	Candidate	Votes	%	±%
Conservative	J. Mowbray*	Unopposed		
Registered electors		1,226		
Conservative hold				
