= 1979 St Edmundsbury Borough Council election =

1979 English local government election

- 3 May 1979

All 44 seats to St Edmundsbury Borough Council 23 seats needed for a majority

	First party	Second party
Party	Conservative	Labour
Seats won	32	8
Seat change	▲2	▼1
Popular vote	23,838	15,460
Percentage	54.8%	35.5%
Swing	▲6.9%	0.0%
	Third party	Fourth party
Party	Independent	Liberal
Seats won	3	1
Seat change	▼2	▲1
Popular vote	2,532	1,277
Percentage	5.8%	2.9%
Swing	▼4.7%	▼2.5%
- Winner of each seat at the 1979 St Edmundsbury Borough Council election.
Council control before election
Conservative
Council control after election
Conservative

The 1979 St Edmundsbury Borough Council election took place on 3 May 1979 to elect members of St Edmundsbury Borough Council in Suffolk, England. This was on the same day as the 1979 general election and other local elections.

The whole council was up for election under new ward boundaries, but the number of seats remained the same.

== Summary ==
=== Election result ===
1979 St Edmundsbury Borough Council election
Party	Candidates	Seats	Gains	Losses	Net gain/loss	Seats %	Votes %	Votes	+/−
Conservative	38	32	N/A	N/A	▲2	72.7	54.8	23,838	+6.9
Labour	30	8	N/A	N/A	▼1	18.2	35.5	15,460	±0.0
Independent	4	3	N/A	N/A	▼2	6.8	5.8	2,532	–4.7
Liberal	3	1	N/A	N/A	▲1	2.3	2.9	1,277	–2.5
Ind. Conservative	1	0	N/A	N/A	Steady	0.0	1.0	419	N/A

11 Conservatives and 2 Labour were elected unopposed.

== Ward results ==
Incumbent councillors standing for re-election are marked with an asterisk (*). Changes in seats do not take into account by-elections or defections.

=== Abbeygate ===
Abbeygate (2 seats)
Party	Candidate	Votes	%
Conservative	F. Jepson	1,256	69.5
Conservative	A. Biggs	1,153	63.8
Labour	M. O'Hanlon	552	30.5
Turnout		~1,808	73.9
Registered electors		2,605	
Conservative win			
Conservative win			

=== Barningham ===
Barningham
Party	Candidate	Votes	%	±%
Conservative	C. Hatten*	Unopposed		
Registered electors		1,419		
Conservative hold				

=== Barrow ===
Barrow
Party	Candidate	Votes	%	±%
Conservative	P. English*	Unopposed		
Registered electors		1,358		
Conservative hold				

=== Cangle ===
Cangle (2 seats)
Party	Candidate	Votes	%	±%
Conservative	G. Rushbrook	1,033	45.7	
Conservative	J. Savage*	973	43.0	
Labour	E. Elkins	911	40.3	
Labour	J. Hartley	878	38.8	
Liberal	C. Parker	317	14.0	
Turnout		~2,261	76.9	
Registered electors		3,033		
Conservative gain from Labour				
Conservative hold				

=== Castle ===
Castle
Party	Candidate	Votes	%	±%
Labour	W. Elkins*	636	63.3	
Conservative	M. Richards	368	36.7	
Majority		268	26.6	
Turnout		1,004	70.5	
Registered electors		1,442		
Labour hold		Swing		

=== Cavendish ===
Cavendish
Party	Candidate	Votes	%	±%
Conservative	J. Wayman	Unopposed		
Registered electors		1,259		
Conservative gain from Independent				

=== Chalkstone ===
Chalkstone (2 seats)
Party	Candidate	Votes	%
Labour	B. Easteal	1,022	54.5
Labour	R. King	869	46.4
Conservative	P. Shaul	853	45.5
Turnout		~1,875	72.7
Registered electors		2,723	
Labour win (new seat)			
Labour win (new seat)			

=== Chevington ===
Chevington
Party	Candidate	Votes	%	±%
Conservative	J. Roberts*	Unopposed		
Registered electors		1,400		
Conservative hold				

=== Clare ===
Clare
Party	Candidate	Votes	%	±%
Conservative	G. Cruickshank	469	42.9	
Independent	E. Soulsby*	419	38.3	
Labour	G. Hatchett	206	18.8	
Majority		50	4.6	
Turnout		1,094	79.9	
Registered electors		1,408		
Conservative gain from Independent		Swing		

=== Clements ===
Clements (2 seats)
Party	Candidate	Votes	%	±%
Labour	H. Eves*	870	55.3	
Labour	M. Manning	717	45.6	
Conservative	A. Ford	702	44.7	
Turnout		~1,572	68.4	
Registered electors		2,301		
Labour hold				
Labour hold				

=== Eastgate ===
Eastgate (2 seats)
Party	Candidate	Votes	%	±%
Conservative	B. Jennings*	924	72.8	
Conservative	R. Self*	868	68.4	
Labour	P. Khan	346	27.2	
Turnout		~1,270	73.5	
Registered electors		1,860		
Conservative hold				
Conservative hold				

=== Fornham ===
Fornham
Party	Candidate	Votes	%	±%
Independent	M. Orsler	578	50.3	
Conservative	J. Warren*	570	49.7	
Majority		8	0.6	
Turnout		1,148	80.4	
Registered electors		1,442		
Independent gain from Conservative		Swing		

=== Great Barton ===
Great Barton
Party	Candidate	Votes	%	±%
Conservative	C. Winsor*	Unopposed		
Registered electors		1,345		
Conservative hold				

=== Honington ===
Honington
Party	Candidate	Votes	%	±%
Conservative	G. Starling*	504	68.1	
Labour	J. Cooper	236	31.9	
Majority		268	36.2	
Turnout		740	71.6	
Registered electors		1,048		
Conservative hold		Swing		

=== Horringer ===
Horringer (2 seats)
Party	Candidate	Votes	%	±%
Conservative	P. Underwood	Unopposed		
Conservative	V. Roth*	Unopposed		
Registered electors		2,427		
Conservative hold				
Conservative win (new seat)				

=== Hundon ===
Hundon
Party	Candidate	Votes	%	±%
Conservative	K. Williams*	Unopposed		
Registered electors		1,520		
Conservative hold				

=== Ixworth ===
Ixworth
Party	Candidate	Votes	%	±%
Conservative	D. Cross*	Unopposed		
Registered electors		1,626		
Conservative hold				

=== Kedington ===
Kedington
Party	Candidate	Votes	%	±%
Conservative	A. Sharpe	656	67.1	
Labour	J. Jackson	322	32.9	
Majority		334	34.2	
Turnout		978	79.1	
Registered electors		1,250		
Conservative hold		Swing		

=== Northgate ===
Northgate (2 seats)
Party	Candidate	Votes	%	±%
Labour	E. Steele*	927	55.8	
Conservative	E. Spooner*	734	44.2	
Conservative	T. Jenkins	647	39.0	
Labour	R. Nowak	625	37.7	
Turnout		~1,661	72.7	
Registered electors		2,460		
Labour hold				
Conservative hold				

=== Pakenham ===
Pakenham
Party	Candidate	Votes	%	±%
Independent	N. Whitwell*	747	74.0	
Labour	L. Aers	262	26.0	
Majority		485	48.1	
Turnout		1,009	72.4	
Registered electors		1,407		
Independent hold		Swing		

=== Risby ===
Risby
Party	Candidate	Votes	%	±%
Conservative	W. Conran*	Unopposed		
Registered electors		1,362		
Conservative hold				

=== Risbygate ===
Risbygate (2 seats)
Party	Candidate	Votes	%	±%
Conservative	A. Davies*	1,059	66.4	
Conservative	H. Marsh*	1,025	64.3	
Labour	J. Gallagher	535	33.6	
Labour	L. Robertson	470	29.5	
Turnout		~1,594	74.4	
Registered electors		2,462		
Conservative hold				
Conservative hold				

=== Rougham ===
Rougham
Party	Candidate	Votes	%	±%
Independent	T. May*	788	72.6	
Labour	B. Eustace	297	27.4	
Majority		491	45.3	
Turnout		1,085	77.7	
Registered electors		1,403		
Independent hold		Swing		

=== Sextons ===
Sextons (2 seats)
Party	Candidate	Votes	%	±%
Conservative	J. Knight*	1,192	61.2	
Conservative	M. Lacey*	1,148	58.9	
Labour	A. Bumpstead	757	38.8	
Labour	R. Cockle	679	34.9	
Turnout		~1,949	80.0	
Registered electors		2,684		
Conservative hold				
Conservative hold				

=== Southgate ===
Southgate (2 seats)
Party	Candidate	Votes	%	±%
Conservative	S. Pott	956	34.6	
Liberal	J. Williams	840	30.4	
Conservative	L. Sewell*	784	28.4	
Labour	A. Robertson	549	19.9	
Ind. Conservative	R. Elliott*	419	15.2	
Labour	E. Bradin	382	13.8	
Turnout		~2,763	76.7	
Registered electors		2,949		
Conservative hold				
Liberal gain from Conservative				

=== St. Marys & Helions ===
St. Marys & Helions
Party	Candidate	Votes	%	±%
Conservative	A. Horrigan	494	55.6	
Labour	R. Bambury	274	30.9	
Liberal	M. Beith	120	13.5	
Majority		220	24.8	
Turnout		888	75.9	
Registered electors		1,189		
Conservative gain from Independent		Swing		

=== St. Olaves ===
St. Olaves (2 seats)
Party	Candidate	Votes	%	±%
Labour	W. Cownley*	Unopposed		
Labour	S. Wormleighton*	Unopposed		
Registered electors		2,492		
Labour hold				
Labour hold				

=== Stanton ===
Stanton
Party	Candidate	Votes	%	±%
Conservative	P. Rudge*	892	66.2	
Labour	D. Pollard	455	33.8	
Majority		437	32.4	
Turnout		1,347	78.1	
Registered electors		1,736		
Conservative hold		Swing		

=== Westgate ===
Westgate (2 seats)
Party	Candidate	Votes	%	±%
Conservative	W. Cutting*	1,496	73.2	
Conservative	D. Kempson	1,406	68.8	
Labour	D. Bartlett	548	26.8	
Labour	V. Bartlett	464	22.7	
Turnout		~2,044	79.1	
Registered electors		2,774		
Conservative hold				
Conservative hold				

=== Whelnetham ===
Whelnetham
Party	Candidate	Votes	%	±%
Conservative	K. Green*	796	64.1	
Labour	D. Bird	445	35.9	
Majority		351	28.3	
Turnout		1,241	83.6	
Registered electors		1,504		
Conservative hold		Swing		

=== Wickhambrook ===
Wickhambrook
Party	Candidate	Votes	%	±%
Conservative	J. Long*	848	79.0	
Labour	A. Inch	226	21.0	
Majority		622	57.9	
Turnout		1,074	77.7	
Registered electors		1,395		
Conservative hold		Swing		

=== Withersfield ===
Withersfield
Party	Candidate	Votes	%	±%
Conservative	J. Mowbray*	Unopposed		
Registered electors		1,251		
Conservative hold				
