= 1973 St Edmundsbury Borough Council election =

1973 English local government election

- 10 May 1973

All 44 seats to St Edmundsbury Borough Council 23 seats needed for a majority

	First party	Second party
Party	Conservative	Labour
Seats won	26	11
Popular vote	12,203	11,193
Percentage	43.2%	39.6%
	Third party	Fourth party
Party	Independent	Ind. Conservative
Seats won	6	1
Popular vote	3,021	481
Percentage	10.7%	1.7%
Control after election
Conservative

The 1973 St Edmundsbury Borough Council election took place on 10 May 1973 to elect members of St Edmundsbury Borough Council in Suffolk, England. This was on the same day as other local elections.

This was the inaugural election to St Edmundsbury Borough Council following its formation by the Local Government Act 1972.

== Summary ==
=== Election result ===
1973 St Edmundsbury Borough Council election
Party	Candidates	Seats	Gains	Losses	Net gain/loss	Seats %	Votes %	Votes	+/−
Conservative	35	26	N/A	N/A	N/A	59.1	43.2	12,203	N/A
Labour	28	11	N/A	N/A	N/A	25.0	39.6	11,193	N/A
Independent	13	6	N/A	N/A	N/A	13.6	10.7	3,021	N/A
Ind. Conservative	1	1	N/A	N/A	N/A	2.3	1.7	481	N/A
Liberal	5	0	N/A	N/A	N/A	0.0	4.9	1,374	N/A

7 Conservatives and 2 Independents were elected unopposed.

== Ward results ==
Incumbent councillors standing for re-election are marked with an asterisk (*). Changes in seats do not take into account by-elections or defections.

=== Barningham ===
Barningham
Party	Candidate	Votes	%
Conservative	C. Hatten	397	67.7
Labour	M. Stewart	189	32.3
Majority		208	35.4
Turnout		586	43.8
Registered electors		1,338	
Conservative win (new seat)			

=== Barrow ===
Barrow
Party	Candidate	Votes	%
Conservative	P. English	327	61.0
Independent	J. Wright	209	39.0
Majority		118	22.0
Turnout		536	40.4
Registered electors		1,326	
Conservative win (new seat)			

=== Bury St Edmunds: Abbeygate ===
Bury St Edmunds: Abbeygate (2 seats)
Party	Candidate	Votes	%
Conservative	F. Jepson	536	70.9
Conservative	A. Biggs	471	62.3
Labour	A. Richardson	220	29.1
Turnout		~756	34.3
Registered electors		2,203	
Conservative win (new seat)			
Conservative win (new seat)			

=== Bury St Edmunds: Eastgate ===
Bury St Edmunds: Eastgate (2 seats)
Party	Candidate	Votes	%
Conservative	B. Jennings	620	55.0
Conservative	R. Self	596	52.8
Labour	S. Hayes	508	45.0
Labour	A. Dale	420	37.2
Turnout		~1,129	55.1
Registered electors		2,049	
Conservative win (new seat)			
Conservative win (new seat)			

=== Bury St Edmunds: Northgate ===
Bury St Edmunds: Northgate (2 seats)
Party	Candidate	Votes	%
Labour	E. Steele	643	53.1
Conservative	E. Spooner	567	46.9
Labour	A. Miller	534	44.1
Conservative	F. Baxter	439	36.3
Turnout		~1,210	42.5
Registered electors		2,846	
Labour win (new seat)			
Conservative win (new seat)			

=== Bury St Edmunds: Risbygate ===
Bury St Edmunds: Risbygate (2 seats)
Party	Candidate	Votes	%
Ind. Conservative	H. Marsh	481	35.4
Conservative	A. Davies	478	35.2
Liberal	D. Shackell	400	29.4
Conservative	M. Lacey	293	21.6
Liberal	J. Williams	288	21.2
Turnout		~1,359	64.2
Registered electors		2,117	
Ind. Conservative win (new seat)			
Conservative win (new seat)			

=== Bury St Edmunds: Sextons ===
Bury St Edmunds: Sextons (2 seats)
Party	Candidate	Votes	%
Conservative	J. Knight	710	57.4
Conservative	A. Tatam	672	54.3
Labour	D. Lockwood	527	42.6
Labour	R. Nowak	412	33.3
Turnout		~1,237	53.4
Registered electors		2,317	
Conservative win (new seat)			
Conservative win (new seat)			

=== Bury St Edmunds: Southgate ===
Bury St Edmunds: Southgate (2 seats)
Party	Candidate	Votes	%
Conservative	R. Elliott	530	39.6
Conservative	L. Sewell	479	35.8
Independent	E. Taylor	436	32.6
Labour	K. Coulling	372	27.8
Labour	A. Robertson	354	26.5
Turnout		~1,339	51.2
Registered electors		2,615	
Conservative win (new seat)			
Conservative win (new seat)			

=== Bury St Edmunds: St. Olaves ===
Bury St Edmunds: St. Olaves (2 seats)
Party	Candidate	Votes	%
Labour	S. Wormleighton	744	66.5
Labour	W. McColl	708	63.3
Independent	S. Forrest	253	22.6
Conservative	W. Hawes	121	10.8
Turnout		~1,119	42.8
Registered electors		2,614	
Labour win (new seat)			
Labour win (new seat)			

=== Bury St Edmunds: Westgate ===
Bury St Edmunds: Westgate (2 seats)
Party	Candidate	Votes	%
Conservative	W. Cutting	729	58.7
Conservative	R. Crickitt	727	58.5
Labour	M. Hayes	512	41.3
Labour	R. Yates	421	33.9
Turnout		~1,240	52.1
Registered electors		2,380	
Conservative win (new seat)			
Conservative win (new seat)			

=== Cavendish ===
Cavendish
Party	Candidate	Votes	%
Independent	K. Rabett	Unopposed	
Registered electors		1,222	
Independent hold			

=== Chevington ===
Chevington
Party	Candidate	Votes	%
Conservative	J. Roberts	Unopposed	
Registered electors		1,327	
Conservative hold			

=== Clare ===
Clare
Party	Candidate	Votes	%
Independent	E. Soulsby	Unopposed	
Registered electors		1,335	
Independent hold			

=== Fornham ===
Fornham
Party	Candidate	Votes	%
Conservative	J. Warren	355	64.9
Independent	H. Nicholls	192	35.1
Majority		163	29.8
Turnout		547	42.2
Registered electors		1,296	
Conservative win (new seat)			

=== Great Barton ===
Great Barton
Party	Candidate	Votes	%
Conservative	C. Winsor	Unopposed	
Registered electors		1,173	
Conservative hold			

=== Haverhill: Cangle ===
Haverhill: Cangle (2 seats)
Party	Candidate	Votes	%
Labour	H. Eves	694	56.7
Labour	K. Poltock	605	49.4
Conservative	S. Pelly	530	43.3
Conservative	G. Brookes	444	36.3
Turnout		~1,225	36.7
Registered electors		3,339	
Labour win (new seat)			
Labour win (new seat)			

=== Haverhill: Castle ===
Haverhill: Castle (2 seats)
Party	Candidate	Votes	%
Labour	W. Elkins	348	67.3
Labour	J. Hartley	318	61.5
Conservative	D. Haylock	169	32.7
Turnout		~517	29.2
Registered electors		1,772	
Labour win (new seat)			
Labour win (new seat)			

=== Haverhill: Clements ===
Haverhill: Clements (2 seats)
Party	Candidate	Votes	%
Labour	T. Allen	388	67.8
Labour	J. Insole	346	60.5
Conservative	A. Currell	184	32.2
Turnout		~571	27.4
Registered electors		2,084	
Labour win (new seat)			
Labour win (new seat)			

=== Haverhill: St. Marys & Helions ===
Haverhill: St. Marys & Helions (2 seats)
Party	Candidate	Votes	%
Independent	W. Blake	590	37.7
Labour	E. Elkins	385	24.6
Conservative	J. Shaul	333	21.3
Liberal	N. Salmon	258	16.5
Labour	F. Niyogi	220	14.0
Turnout		~1,566	76.9
Registered electors		2,037	
Independent win (new seat)			
Labour win (new seat)			

=== Honington ===
Honington
Party	Candidate	Votes	%
Conservative	G. Starling	Unopposed	
Registered electors		1,076	
Conservative hold			

=== Horringer ===
Horringer
Party	Candidate	Votes	%
Conservative	V. Roth	Unopposed	
Registered electors		1,416	
Conservative hold			

=== Hundon ===
Hundon
Party	Candidate	Votes	%
Conservative	J. Copson	413	78.7
Independent	K. Wilkin	112	21.3
Majority		301	57.4
Turnout		525	35.9
Registered electors		1,462	
Conservative win (new seat)			

=== Ixworth ===
Ixworth
Party	Candidate	Votes	%
Conservative	D. Cross	202	39.2
Labour	P. Gay	182	35.3
Independent	M. Rowe	131	25.4
Majority		20	3.9
Turnout		515	60.4
Registered electors		853	
Conservative win (new seat)			

=== Kedington ===
Kedington
Party	Candidate	Votes	%
Conservative	A. Kiddy	326	51.1
Labour	B. Watts	312	48.9
Majority		14	2.2
Turnout		638	52.1
Registered electors		1,224	
Conservative win (new seat)			

=== Pakenham ===
Pakenham
Party	Candidate	Votes	%
Independent	N. Whitwell	208	55.6
Labour	W. Rayner	166	44.4
Majority		42	11.2
Turnout		374	41.4
Registered electors		904	
Independent win (new seat)			

=== Risby ===
Risby
Party	Candidate	Votes	%
Conservative	W. Conran	Unopposed	
Registered electors		1,175	
Conservative hold			

=== Rougham ===
Rougham
Party	Candidate	Votes	%
Independent	T. May	513	91.4
Labour	E. Lacey	48	8.6
Majority		465	82.8
Turnout		561	40.9
Registered electors		1,372	
Independent win (new seat)			

=== Stanton ===
Stanton
Party	Candidate	Votes	%
Labour	A. Jones	333	44.9
Conservative	P. Rudge	206	27.8
Liberal	T. Cook	203	27.4
Majority		127	17.1
Turnout		742	63.5
Registered electors		1,169	
Labour win (new seat)			

=== Troston ===
Troston
Party	Candidate	Votes	%
Conservative	J. Wortley	Unopposed	
Registered electors		1,030	
Conservative hold			

=== Whelnetham ===
Whelnetham
Party	Candidate	Votes	%
Conservative	K. Green	349	55.1
Labour	N. Plumb	284	44.9
Majority		65	10.2
Turnout		633	46.5
Registered electors		1,362	
Conservative win (new seat)			

=== Wickhambrook ===
Wickhambrook
Party	Candidate	Votes	%
Independent	V. Harrod	260	43.2
Liberal	A. Hicks	225	37.4
Independent	J. Gardner	117	19.4
Majority		35	5.8
Turnout		602	44.6
Registered electors		1,350	
Independent win (new seat)			

=== Withersfield ===
Withersfield
Party	Candidate	Votes	%
Conservative	J. Mowbray	Unopposed	
Registered electors		1,175	
Conservative hold			
