= 2015 St Edmundsbury Borough Council election =

2015 English local government election

- 7 May 2015

All 45 seats to West Suffolk District Council 23 seats needed for a majority

	First party	Second party	Third party
Party	Conservative	UKIP	Labour
Seats won	36	4	2
Seat change	▼2	▲4	▼1
Popular vote	36,089	8,983	14,797
Percentage	52.2%	13.0%	21.4%
Swing	▼2.4%	▲12.5%	▼4.5%
	Fourth party	Fifth party
Party	Independent	Green
Seats won	2	1
Seat change	▼2	▲1
Popular vote	5,081	2,548
Percentage	7.4%	3.7%
Swing	▼0.6%	▼1.7%
- Winner of each seat at the 2015 St Edmundsbury Borough Council election.
Control before election
Conservative
Control after election
Conservative

The 2015 St Edmundsbury Borough Council election took place on 7 May 2015 to elect members of St Edmundsbury Borough Council in Suffolk, England. This was on the same day as the 2015 general election and other local elections.

This was the final election to St Edmundsbury Borough Council before it was abolished and merged with Forest Heath to form West Suffolk. The inaugural election to West Suffolk District Council was held in 2019.

== Summary ==
=== Election result ===
2015 St Edmundsbury Borough Council election
Party	Candidates	Seats	Gains	Losses	Net gain/loss	Seats %	Votes %	Votes	+/−
Conservative	43	36	2	4	▼2	80.0	52.2	36,089	–2.4
UKIP	15	4	4	0	▲4	8.9	13.0	8,983	+12.5
Labour	27	2	0	1	▼1	4.4	21.4	14,797	–4.5
Independent	7	2	0	2	▼2	4.4	7.4	5,081	–0.6
Green	4	1	1	0	▲1	2.2	3.7	2,548	–1.7
Liberal Democrats	4	0	0	0	Steady	0.0	2.4	1,627	–3.1

== Ward results ==
Incumbent councillors standing for re-election are marked with an asterisk (*). Changes in seats do not take into account by-elections or defections.

=== Abbeygate ===
Abbeygate (2 seats)
Party	Candidate	Votes	%	±%
Conservative	Joanna Rayner	1,169	48.4	
Conservative	Andrew Speed	893	37.0	
Green	Paul Rynsard	759	31.4	
Labour	Robin Bennett	691	28.6	
Liberal Democrats	Judith Broadway	635	26.3	
Turnout		2,414	66.0	
Registered electors		3,660		
Conservative hold				
Conservative hold				

=== Bardwell ===
Bardwell
Party	Candidate	Votes	%	±%
Conservative	Paula Wade	867	59.0	
Labour	Cyrille Bouche	309	21.0	
UKIP	James Lumley	293	20.0	
Majority		558	38.0	
Turnout		1,469	73.3	
Registered electors		2,025		
Conservative hold				

=== Barningham ===
Barningham
Party	Candidate	Votes	%	±%
Conservative	Carol Bull	Unopposed		
Registered electors		N/A		
Conservative hold				

=== Barrow ===
Barrow
Party	Candidate	Votes	%	±%
Conservative	Ian Houlder*	845	61.0	
Liberal Democrats	Zigurds Kronbergs	345	24.9	
Labour	Andrew Whiting	195	14.1	
Majority		500	36.1	
Turnout		1,385	75.2	
Registered electors		1,870		
Conservative hold				

=== Cavendish ===
Cavendish
Party	Candidate	Votes	%	±%
Conservative	Peter Stevens*	779	65.7	
UKIP	Stuart Letten	406	34.3	
Majority		373	31.4	
Turnout		1,185	72.9	
Registered electors		1,702		
Conservative hold				

=== Chedburgh ===
Chedburgh
Party	Candidate	Votes	%	±%
Conservative	Angela Rushen*	Unopposed		
Registered electors		N/A		
Conservative hold				

=== Clare ===
Clare
Party	Candidate	Votes	%	±%
Conservative	Alaric Pugh*	808	71.4	
UKIP	David Reynolds	323	28.6	
Majority		485	42.8	
Turnout		1,131	69.8	
Registered electors		1,709		
Conservative hold				

=== Eastgate ===
Eastgate
Party	Candidate	Votes	%	±%
Conservative	Patricia Warby*	612	54.2	
Labour	Nicola Ridgeway	518	45.8	
Majority		94	8.4	
Turnout		1,130	61.1	
Registered electors		1,897		
Conservative hold				

=== Fornham ===
Fornham
Party	Candidate	Votes	%	±%
Conservative	Rebecca Hopfensperger*	894	72.7	
Labour	Shirley Stephenson	336	27.3	
Majority		558	45.4	
Turnout		1,230	73.0	
Registered electors		1,708		
Conservative hold				

=== Great Barton ===
Great Barton
Party	Candidate	Votes	%	±%
Conservative	Sarah Broughton*	1,054	80.0	
Labour	Tom Stebbing	264	20.0	
Majority		790	60.0	
Turnout		1,318	76.1	
Registered electors		1,759		
Conservative hold				

=== Haverhill East ===
Haverhill East (3 seats)
Party	Candidate	Votes	%	±%
UKIP	Anthony Brown	1,135	36.1	
Conservative	Ivor McLatchy	978	31.1	
UKIP	John Burns	892	28.4	
Labour	Roger André	800	25.4	
Conservative	Hui Yang	764	24.3	
Labour	Patrick Hanlon	757	24.1	
Conservative	John Exton	754	24.0	
Labour	Ernie Goody	724	23.0	
Turnout		3,144	57.1	
Registered electors		5,503		
UKIP gain from Conservative				
Conservative hold				
UKIP gain from Conservative				

=== Haverhill North ===
Haverhill North (3 seats)
Party	Candidate	Votes	%	±%
Conservative	Timothy Marks*	1,257	38.0	
UKIP	Barry Robbins	1,155	34.9	
Conservative	Betty McLatchy	1,095	33.1	
Conservative	John McManus*	980	29.6	
Labour	Thomas Chivers	806	24.4	
UKIP	Anthony Williams	776	23.5	
Labour	Elizabeth Smith	728	22.0	
Labour	Alan Pearson	657	19.9	
Turnout		3,308	58.9	
Registered electors		5,616		
Conservative hold				
UKIP gain from Conservative				
Conservative hold				

=== Haverhill South ===
Haverhill South (2 seats)
Party	Candidate	Votes	%	±%
UKIP	Jason Crooks	689	34.2	
Conservative	Paula Fox	661	32.8	
Labour	Maureen Byrne*	631	31.3	
Labour	David Smith	412	20.5	
Conservative	Clive Turner	364	18.1	
Liberal Democrats	Kenneth Rolph	157	7.8	
Turnout		2,013	51.2	
Registered electors		3,932		
UKIP gain from Labour				
Conservative hold				

=== Haverhill West ===
Haverhill West (2 seats)
Party	Candidate	Votes	%	±%
Conservative	Margaret Marks	1,150	46.1	
Conservative	David Roach	978	39.2	
UKIP	Mark Dorey	852	34.1	
Labour	Mary Dunning	720	28.9	
Turnout		2,495	62.2	
Registered electors		4,011		
Conservative hold				
Conservative hold				

=== Horringer and Whelnetham ===
Horringer and Whelnetham
Party	Candidate	Votes	%	±%
Conservative	Terence Clements*	905	68.8	
Labour	Robin Davies	411	31.2	
Majority		494	37.6	
Turnout		1,316	76.5	
Registered electors		1,755		
Conservative hold				

=== Hundon ===
Hundon
Party	Candidate	Votes	%	±%
Conservative	Jeremy Farthing	752	63.4	
UKIP	Paul Stigwood	435	36.6	
Majority		317	26.8	
Turnout		1,187	71.9	
Registered electors		1,740		
Conservative hold				

=== Ixworth ===
Ixworth
Party	Candidate	Votes	%	±%
Conservative	John Griffiths*	Unopposed		
Registered electors		N/A		
Conservative hold				

=== Kedington ===
Kedington
Party	Candidate	Votes	%	±%
Conservative	Karen Richardson	595	52.9	
UKIP	Bryan Hawes	305	27.2	
Labour	Stephen Nutt	223	19.9	
Majority		290	25.7	
Turnout		1,123	71.4	
Registered electors		1,586		
Conservative hold				

=== Minden ===
Minden (2 seats)
Party	Candidate	Votes	%	±%
Conservative	Robert Everitt*	1,069	45.1	
Conservative	Clive Springett*	768	32.4	
Labour	Jonathan Hartley	583	24.6	
UKIP	Christopher Riley	543	22.9	
Green	Mark Ereira-Guyer	530	22.3	
Green	Martin Trnecka	331	14.0	
Turnout		2,372	68.1	
Registered electors		3,482		
Conservative hold				
Conservative hold				

=== Moreton Hall ===
Moreton Hall (3 seats)
Party	Candidate	Votes	%	±%
Conservative	Francis Warby*	1,862	47.9	
Conservative	Terence Buckle*	1,668	42.9	
Conservative	Peter Thompson	1,551	39.9	
Independent	Trevor Beckwith*	1,428	36.7	
Labour	Clifford Hind	961	24.7	
Turnout		3,890	68.7	
Registered electors		5,665		
Conservative hold				
Conservative hold				
Conservative gain from Independent				

=== Northgate ===
Northgate
Party	Candidate	Votes	%	±%
Labour	Diane Hind*	521	50.9	
Conservative	Carl Poole	502	49.1	
Majority		19	1.8	
Turnout		1,023	55.7	
Registered electors		1,883		
Labour hold				

=== Pakenham ===
Pakenham
Party	Candidate	Votes	%	±%
Conservative	Simon Brown	926	74.3	
Labour	Gillian Malik	321	25.7	
Majority		605	48.6	
Turnout		1,247	61.1	
Registered electors		2,079		
Conservative hold				

=== Risby ===
Risby
Party	Candidate	Votes	%	±%
Conservative	Susan Glossop	Unopposed		
Registered electors		N/A		
Conservative hold				

=== Risbygate ===
Risbygate (2 seats)
Party	Candidate	Votes	%	±%
Independent	David Nettleton*	1,067	46.3	
Green	Ida Rynsard	928	40.3	
Conservative	Rodney Barrett	926	40.2	
Labour	Marilyn Sayer	558	24.2	
Turnout		2,303	62.9	
Registered electors		3,663		
Independent hold				
Green gain from Conservative				

=== Rougham ===
Rougham
Party	Candidate	Votes	%	±%
Conservative	Sara Mildmay-White*	967	73.4	
Labour	Kevin Hind	351	26.6	
Majority		616	46.8	
Turnout		1,318	72.0	
Registered electors		1,860		
Conservative hold				

=== St Olaves ===
St Olaves (2 seats)
Party	Candidate	Votes	%	±%
Independent	Paul Hopfensperger*	835	47.3	
Labour	Robert Cockle*	699	39.6	
Conservative	Thomas Murray	677	38.4	
Labour	Quentin Cornish	462	26.2	
Turnout		1,765	51.5	
Registered electors		3,428		
Independent hold				
Labour hold				

=== Southgate ===
Southgate (2 seats)
Party	Candidate	Votes	%	±%
Conservative	Hung Chow Chung*	1,507	61.1	
Conservative	Sarah-Anne Stamp*	1,179	47.8	
Labour	Janet Lavender	586	23.8	
Liberal Democrats	Christopher Lale	490	19.9	
UKIP	Colin Freeman	450	18.3	
Turnout		2,465	71.5	
Registered electors		3,447		
Conservative hold				
Conservative hold				

=== Stanton ===
Stanton
Party	Candidate	Votes	%	±%
Conservative	Jim Thorndyke*	Unopposed		
Registered electors		N/A		
Conservative hold				

=== Westgate ===
Westgate (2 seats)
Party	Candidate	Votes	%	±%
Conservative	Wayne Hailstone	1,129	45.6	
Conservative	Richard Rout	964	38.9	
Labour	Kevin Waterson	573	23.2	
UKIP	Clive Reason	529	21.4	
Independent	Stefan Oliver*	414	16.7	
Independent	Martin Tilley	357	14.4	
Turnout		2,475	72.5	
Registered electors		3,413		
Conservative hold				
Conservative hold				

=== Wickhambrook ===
Wickhambrook
Party	Candidate	Votes	%	±%
Conservative	Clive Pollington	623	50.2	
Independent	Derek Redhead*	617	49.8	
Majority		6	0.4	
Turnout		1,240	70.8	
Registered electors		1,771		
Conservative gain from Independent				

=== Withersfield ===
Withersfield
Party	Candidate	Votes	%	±%
Conservative	Jane Midwood	617	52.3	
Independent	Robert Clifton-Brown*	363	30.8	
UKIP	Dudley Haylock	200	16.9	
Majority		254	21.5	
Turnout		1,180	73.4	
Registered electors		1,637		
Conservative hold				

== By-elections ==
=== Haverhill North ===
Haverhill North by-election: 5 May 2016
Party	Candidate	Votes	%	±%
UKIP	Anthony Williams	563	37.3	
Labour	Maureen Byrne	460	30.5	
Conservative	Quillon Fox	409	27.1	
Liberal Democrats	Kenneth Rolph	78	5.2	
Majority		103	6.8	
Turnout		1,510	26.9	
Registered electors		5,613		
UKIP gain from Conservative		Swing		

=== Bardwell ===
Bardwell by-election: 24 November 2016
Party	Candidate	Votes	%	±%
Conservative	Andrew Smith	Unopposed		
Registered electors		N/A		
Conservative hold				

=== Moreton Hall ===
Moreton Hall by-election: 15 December 2016
Party	Candidate	Votes	%	±%
Independent	Trevor Beckwith	550	56.0	
Conservative	Sue Bill	213	21.7	
Liberal Democrats	Chris Lale	102	10.4	
Labour	Alex Griffin	71	7.2	
UKIP	Julian Flood	47	4.8	
Majority		337	34.3	
Turnout		983	18.1	
Registered electors		5,431		
Independent gain from Conservative		Swing		

=== Chedburgh ===
Chedburgh by-election: 28 September 2017
Party	Candidate	Votes	%	±%
Conservative	Mike Chester	372	65.8	
Labour	Gary Dillon	128	22.7	
Liberal Democrats	Ian Chapman	65	11.5	
Majority		244	43.1	
Turnout		565	31.9	
Registered electors		1,771		
Conservative hold		Swing		

=== Hundon ===
Hundon by-election: 28 September 2017
Party	Candidate	Votes	%	±%
Conservative	Mary Evans	357	80.6	
Liberal Democrats	Alex Rolph	86	19.4	
Majority		271	61.2	
Turnout		443	25.1	
Registered electors		1,765		
Conservative hold		Swing		

=== St. Olaves ===
St. Olaves by-election: 12 April 2018
Party	Candidate	Votes	%	±%
Labour	Max Clarke	365	58.6	
Conservative	Tom Murray	150	24.1	
Independent	Liam Byrne	77	12.4	
Liberal Democrats	Helen Korfanty	31	5.0	
Majority		215	34.5	
Turnout		623	18.6	
Registered electors		3,349		
Labour hold		Swing		

=== Haverhill East ===
Haverhill East by-election: 3 May 2018
Party	Candidate	Votes	%	±%
Conservative	Robin Pilley	577	47.3	
Labour	David Smith	490	40.2	
Liberal Democrats	Saoirse O'Suilleabhán	152	12.5	
Majority		87	7.1	
Turnout		1,219	23.0	
Registered electors		4,865		
Conservative hold				

=== Haverhill North ===
Haverhill North by-election: 3 May 2018
Party	Candidate	Votes	%	±%
Conservative	Elaine McManus	752	56.0	
Labour	Martin Jerram	444	33.0	
Liberal Democrats	Peter Lord	148	11.0	
Majority		308	23.0	
Turnout		1,344	24.2	
Registered electors		5,554		
Conservative hold		Swing		
