= 2011 St Edmundsbury Borough Council election =

2011 English local government election

- 5 May 2011

All 45 seats to St Edmundsbury Borough Council 23 seats needed for a majority

	First party	Second party
Party	Conservative	Independent
Seats won	38	4
Seat change	▲2	▲1
Popular vote	22,249	3,275
Percentage	54.6%	8.0%
Swing	▼0.4%	▼0.8%
	Third party	Fourth party
Party	Labour	Liberal Democrats
Seats won	3	0
Seat change	Steady	▼3
Popular vote	10,580	2,247
Percentage	25.9%	5.5%
Swing	▲10.1%	▼12.6%
- Winner of each seat at the 2011 St Edmundsbury Borough Council election.
Control before election
Conservative
Control after election
Conservative

The 2011 St Edmundsbury Borough Council election took place on 5 May 2011 to elect members of St Edmundsbury Borough Council in Suffolk, England. This was on the same day as other local elections.

== Summary ==
=== Election result ===
2011 St Edmundsbury Borough Council election
Party	Candidates	Seats	Gains	Losses	Net gain/loss	Seats %	Votes %	Votes	+/−
Conservative	40	38	3	1	▲2	84.4	54.6	22,249	–0.4
Independent	4	4	1	0	▲1	8.9	8.0	3,275	–0.8
Labour	27	3	1	1	Steady	6.7	25.9	10,580	+10.1
Liberal Democrats	8	0	0	3	▼3	0.0	5.5	2,247	–12.6
Green	6	0	0	0	Steady	0.0	5.4	2,209	+4.0
UKIP	1	0	0	0	Steady	0.0	0.5	223	–0.4

== Ward results ==
Incumbent councillors standing for re-election are marked with an asterisk (*). Changes in seats do not take into account by-elections or defections.

=== Abbeygate ===
Abbeygate (2 seats)
Party	Candidate	Votes	%	±%
Conservative	Paul Farmer*	1,007	57.0	
Conservative	Richard Rout*	744	42.1	
Green	Philippa Judd	448	25.4	
Liberal Democrats	Christopher Lale	317	18.0	
Labour	Thomas Stebbing	282	16.0	
Labour	Christina Ross	259	14.7	
Turnout		~1,718	45.4	
Registered electors		3,786		
Conservative hold				
Conservative hold				

=== Bardwell ===
Bardwell
Party	Candidate	Votes	%	±%
Conservative	John Hale*	737	76.8	
UKIP	James Lumley	223	23.2	
Majority		514	53.5	
Turnout		960	51.1	
Registered electors		2,012		
Conservative hold				

=== Barningham ===
Barningham
Party	Candidate	Votes	%	±%
Conservative	David Ray*	726	70.4	
Liberal Democrats	David Bradbury	305	29.6	
Majority		421	40.8	
Turnout		1,031	51.0	
Registered electors		2,086		
Conservative hold				

=== Barrow ===
Barrow
Party	Candidate	Votes	%	±%
Conservative	Ian Houlder*	Unopposed		
Registered electors		1,798		
Conservative hold				

=== Cavendish ===
Cavendish
Party	Candidate	Votes	%	±%
Conservative	Peter Stevens*	Unopposed		
Registered electors		1,633		
Conservative hold				

=== Chedburgh ===
Chedburgh
Party	Candidate	Votes	%	±%
Conservative	Angela Rushen	Unopposed		
Registered electors		1,709		
Conservative hold				

=== Clare ===
Clare
Party	Candidate	Votes	%	±%
Conservative	Alaric Pugh	482	57.0	
Liberal Democrats	Leslie Warmington	364	43.0	
Majority		118	13.9	
Turnout		846	51.4	
Registered electors		1,688		
Conservative hold				

=== Eastgate ===
Eastgate
Party	Candidate	Votes	%	±%
Conservative	Patricia Warby*	427	56.3	
Labour	Shirley Stephenson	332	43.7	
Majority		95	12.5	
Turnout		759	41.1	
Registered electors		1,892		
Conservative hold				

=== Fornham ===
Fornham
Party	Candidate	Votes	%	±%
Conservative	Rebecca Hopfensperger	621	73.7	
Labour	Sarah-Jane Pearce	222	26.3	
Majority		399	47.3	
Turnout		843	49.0	
Registered electors		1,736		
Conservative gain from Liberal Democrats		Swing		

=== Great Barton ===
Great Barton
Party	Candidate	Votes	%	±%
Conservative	Sarah Broughton*	751	79.1	
Labour	Pervez Khan	199	20.9	
Majority		552	58.1	
Turnout		950	54.6	
Registered electors		1,773		
Conservative hold				

=== Haverhill East ===
Haverhill East (3 seats)
Party	Candidate	Votes	%	±%
Conservative	Leslie Ager*	834	49.2	
Conservative	Karen Richardson*	664	39.2	
Conservative	Gordon Cox*	662	39.1	
Labour	Patrick Hanlon	648	38.3	
Labour	Ernest Goody	636	37.5	
Liberal Democrats	Terence McNally	260	15.3	
Liberal Democrats	Kenneth Rolph	188	11.1	
Turnout		~1,694	31.1	
Registered electors		5,447		
Conservative hold				
Conservative hold				
Conservative hold				

=== Haverhill North ===
Haverhill North (3 seats)
Party	Candidate	Votes	%	±%
Conservative	Patricia Gower*	857	48.0	
Conservative	Timothy Marks	825	46.2	
Conservative	John McManus	771	43.2	
Labour	Julie Jupp	654	36.6	
Labour	Gary Stroud	600	33.6	
Liberal Democrats	Allyn Bignell	375	21.0	
Turnout		~1,785	31.5	
Registered electors		5,667		
Conservative hold				
Conservative hold				
Conservative hold				

=== Haverhill South ===
Haverhill South (2 seats)
Party	Candidate	Votes	%	±%
Labour	Maureen Byrne	428	43.4	
Conservative	Phillip French	395	40.0	
Labour	Lisa Carr	373	37.8	
Conservative	Clive Turner*	359	36.4	
Liberal Democrats	Michael Graham	145	14.7	
Turnout		~987	25.8	
Registered electors		3,827		
Labour gain from Conservative				
Conservative hold				

=== Haverhill West ===
Haverhill West (2 seats)
Party	Candidate	Votes	%	±%
Conservative	Adam Whittaker*	804	59.0	
Conservative	Jeremy Farthing*	707	51.9	
Labour	Roger André	529	38.8	
Turnout		~1,362	34.0	
Registered electors		4,007		
Conservative hold				
Conservative hold				

=== Horringer & Whelnetham ===
Horringer & Whelnetham
Party	Candidate	Votes	%	±%
Conservative	Terence Clements*	630	70.6	
Labour	Robin Davies	262	29.4	
Majority		368	41.3	
Turnout		892	52.0	
Registered electors		1,742		
Conservative hold				

=== Hundon ===
Hundon
Party	Candidate	Votes	%	±%
Conservative	Dorothy Whittaker*	Unopposed		
Registered electors		1,745		
Conservative hold				

=== Ixworth ===
Ixworth
Party	Candidate	Votes	%	±%
Conservative	John Griffiths*	Unopposed		
Registered electors		1,782		
Conservative hold				

=== Kedington ===
Kedington
Party	Candidate	Votes	%	±%
Conservative	Marion Rushbrook*	Unopposed		
Registered electors		1,593		
Conservative hold				

=== Minden ===
Minden (2 seats)
Party	Candidate	Votes	%	±%
Conservative	Robert Everitt*	791	49.4	
Conservative	Clive Springett	720	45.0	
Labour	Quentin Cornish	524	32.7	
Labour	Jonathan Hartley	426	26.6	
Green	Ritchie Tennant	340	21.2	
Turnout		~1,601	45.0	
Registered electors		3,558		
Conservative hold				
Conservative hold				

=== Moreton Hall ===
Moreton Hall (3 seats)
Party	Candidate	Votes	%	±%
Independent	Trevor Beckwith*	1,443	61.9	
Conservative	Frank Warby*	1,211	51.9	
Conservative	Terry Buckle*	990	42.4	
Labour	Clifford Hind	500	21.4	
Labour	Kevin Waterson	364	15.6	
Turnout		~2,333	41.5	
Registered electors		5,621		
Independent hold				
Conservative hold				
Conservative hold				

=== Northgate ===
Northgate
Party	Candidate	Votes	%	±%
Labour	Diane Hind	315	53.2	
Green	Ida Rynsard	258	43.6	
Majority		57	9.6	
Turnout		592	32.1	
Registered electors		1,843		
Labour hold				

=== Pakenham ===
Pakenham
Party	Candidate	Votes	%	±%
Conservative	Christopher Spicer*	623	75.7	
Labour	Gillian Malik	193	23.5	
Majority		430	52.2	
Turnout		823	32.4	
Registered electors		2,541		
Conservative hold				

=== Risby ===
Risby
Party	Candidate	Votes	%	±%
Conservative	Helen Levack*	Unopposed		
Registered electors		1,970		
Conservative hold				

=== Risbygate ===
Risbygate (2 seats)
Party	Candidate	Votes	%	±%
Independent	David Nettleton*	840	58.8	
Conservative	Joshua Hordern	520	36.4	
Green	Karen Richardson	450	31.5	
Labour	Neil Moffat	266	18.6	
Labour	Ross Taylor	198	13.9	
Turnout		~1,430	38.5	
Registered electors		3,713		
Independent hold				
Conservative hold				

=== Rougham ===
Rougham
Party	Candidate	Votes	%	±%
Conservative	Sara Mildmay-White*	656	72.2	
Labour	Janet Lavender	236	26.0	
Majority		420	46.2	
Turnout		908	49.8	
Registered electors		1,824		
Conservative hold				

=== Southgate ===
Southgate (2 seats)
Party	Candidate	Votes	%	±%
Conservative	Chung Hung Chow	864	52.0	
Conservative	Sarah-Anne Stamp	668	40.2	
Labour	Richard Blyth	387	23.3	
Labour	Nicola Ridgeway	387	23.3	
Green	Sara Rae	341	20.5	
Liberal Democrats	Gordon Hughes	293	17.6	
Turnout		~1,663	48.5	
Registered electors		3,428		
Conservative gain from Liberal Democrats				
Conservative gain from Liberal Democrats				

=== St. Olaves ===
St. Olaves (2 seats)
Party	Candidate	Votes	%	±%
Labour	Robert Cockle*	461	47.8	
Independent	Paul Hopfensperger	421	43.6	
Green	Mark Ereira-Guyer	372	38.6	
Labour	Kevin Hind	314	32.5	
Turnout		~965	29.3	
Registered electors		3,293		
Labour hold				
Independent gain from Labour				

=== Stanton ===
Stanton
Party	Candidate	Votes	%	±%
Conservative	John Thorndyke*	Unopposed		
Registered electors		1,989		
Conservative hold				

=== Westgate ===
Westgate (2 seats)
Party	Candidate	Votes	%	±%
Conservative	Stefan Oliver*	929	57.6	
Conservative	Paul Simner	879	54.5	
Labour	Alexander Carmichael	501	31.1	
Labour	Timothy Beech	471	29.2	
Turnout		~1,613	47.8	
Registered electors		3,375		
Conservative hold				
Conservative hold				

=== Wickhambrook ===
Wickhambrook
Party	Candidate	Votes	%	±%
Independent	Derek Redhead*	571	58.7	
Conservative	Susan Houlder	395	40.6	
Majority		176	18.1	
Turnout		973	54.4	
Registered electors		1,788		
Independent hold				

=== Withersfield ===
Withersfield
Party	Candidate	Votes	%	±%
Conservative	Robert Clifton-Brown*	Unopposed		
Registered electors		1,624		
Conservative hold				

== By-elections ==
Risbygate By-Election 15 November 2012
Party	Candidate	Votes	%	±%
Green	Julia Wakelam	394	51.8	+30.1
Conservative	Susan Glossop	239	31.4	+6.4
Labour	Cliff Hind	128	16.8	+4.0
Majority		155	20.4	
Turnout		761		
Green gain from Conservative		Swing		

Abbeygate By-Election 2 May 2013
Party	Candidate	Votes	%	±%
Conservative	Charlotte Howard	562	44.5	−4.5
Green	Philippa Judd	399	31.6	+9.8
Labour	Quentin Cornish	154	12.2	−1.5
Liberal Democrats	Judith Broadway	149	11.8	−3.6
Majority		163	12.9	
Turnout		1,264		
Conservative hold		Swing		

Bardwell By-Election 5 September 2013
Party	Candidate	Votes	%	±%
Conservative	Paula Wade	419	66.1	−10.7
UKIP	James Lumley	150	23.7	+0.5
Labour	Thomas Stebbing	65	10.3	+10.3
Majority		269	42.4	
Turnout		634		
Conservative hold		Swing		

Abbeygate By-Election 3 October 2013
Party	Candidate	Votes	%	±%
Conservative	Joanna Rayner	359	42.8	−1.7
Green	Mark Ereira-Guyer	236	28.1	−3.5
UKIP	Clive Reason	85	10.1	+10.1
Liberal Democrats	Chris Lale	83	9.9	−1.9
Labour	Quentin Cornish	76	9.1	−3.1
Majority		123	14.7	
Turnout		839		
Conservative hold		Swing		

Haverhill East By-Election 9 January 2014
Party	Candidate	Votes	%	±%
UKIP	Tony Brown	529	54.0	+54.0
Labour	Pat Hanlon	240	24.5	−12.7
Conservative	David Roach	157	16.0	−31.9
Liberal Democrats	Ken Rolph	54	5.5	−9.4
Majority		289	29.5	
Turnout		980	16.4	
UKIP gain from Conservative		Swing		
