= 2007 St Edmundsbury Borough Council election =

2007 English local government election

- 3 May 2007

All 45 seats to St Edmundsbury Borough Council 23 seats needed for a majority

	First party	Second party
Party	Conservative	Liberal Democrats
Seats won	36	3
Seat change	▲8	▲1
Popular vote	19,587	6,461
Percentage	55.0%	18.1%
Swing	▲7.2%	▲10.7%
	Third party	Fourth party
Party	Labour	Independent
Seats won	3	3
Seat change	▼9	Steady
Popular vote	5,610	3,148
Percentage	15.8%	8.8%
Swing	▼19.7%	0.0%
- Winner of each seat at the 2007 St Edmundsbury Borough Council election.
Control before election
Conservative
Control after election
Conservative

The 2007 St Edmundsbury Borough Council election took place on 3 May 2007 to elect members of St Edmundsbury Borough Council in Suffolk, England. This was on the same day as other local elections.

== Summary ==
=== Election result ===
2007 St Edmundsbury Borough Council election
Party	Candidates	Seats	Gains	Losses	Net gain/loss	Seats %	Votes %	Votes	+/−
Conservative	45	36	9	1	▲8	80.0	55.0	19,587	+7.2
Liberal Democrats	24	3	1	0	▲1	6.7	18.1	6,461	+10.7
Labour	19	3	0	9	▼9	6.7	15.8	5,610	–19.7
Independent	8	3	1	1	Steady	6.7	8.8	3,148	±0.0
Green	2	0	0	0	Steady	0.0	1.4	501	N/A
UKIP	3	0	0	0	Steady	0.0	0.9	304	+0.4

6 Conservatives were elected unopposed.

== Ward results ==
Incumbent councillors standing for re-election are marked with an asterisk (*). Changes in seats do not take into account by-elections or defections.

=== Abbeygate ===
Abbeygate (2 seats)
Party	Candidate	Votes	%	±%
Conservative	Paul Farmer*	819	56.8	
Conservative	Richard Rout	582	40.4	
Independent	Mark Bergdahl	519	36.0	
Liberal Democrats	Clare Higson	348	24.1	
Green	Ritchie Tennant	309	21.4	
Turnout		~1,440	39.7	
Registered electors		3,627		
Conservative hold				
Conservative gain from Independent				

=== Bardwell ===
Bardwell
Party	Candidate	Votes	%	±%
Conservative	John Hale*	540	75.1	
UKIP	Tracy Lumley	179	24.9	
Majority		361	50.2	
Turnout		719	38.3	
Registered electors		1,902		
Conservative hold				

=== Barningham ===
Barningham
Party	Candidate	Votes	%	±%
Conservative	Dave Ray	494	57.3	
Liberal Democrats	David Bradbury	288	33.4	
UKIP	James Lumley	80	9.3	
Majority		206	23.9	
Turnout		862	41.7	
Registered electors		2,082		
Conservative hold				

=== Barrow ===
Barrow
Party	Candidate	Votes	%	±%
Conservative	Ian Houlder*	385	50.9	
Independent	Vivienne Hughes	276	36.5	
Liberal Democrats	Verity Hall	95	12.6	
Majority		109	14.4	
Turnout		756	44.5	
Registered electors		1,712		
Conservative hold				

=== Cavendish ===
Cavendish
Party	Candidate	Votes	%	±%
Conservative	Peter Stevens*	Unopposed		
Registered electors		1,575		
Conservative hold				

=== Chedburgh ===
Chedburgh
Party	Candidate	Votes	%	±%
Conservative	Nigel Aitkens*	Unopposed		
Registered electors		1,725		
Conservative hold				

=== Clare ===
Clare
Party	Candidate	Votes	%	±%
Conservative	Jane Bone	356	54.7	
Independent	Leslie Warmington	295	45.3	
Majority		61	9.4	
Turnout		651	39.8	
Registered electors		1,646		
Conservative hold				

=== Eastgate ===
Eastgate
Party	Candidate	Votes	%	±%
Conservative	Patsy Warby*	315	60.7	
Labour	Diane Hind	204	39.3	
Majority		111	21.4	
Turnout		519	31.6	
Registered electors		1,671		
Conservative hold				

=== Fornham ===
Fornham
Party	Candidate	Votes	%	±%
Liberal Democrats	David Chappell	285	42.7	
Conservative	Rowland Lester	209	31.3	
Independent	Alan Murdie	174	26.0	
Majority		76	11.4	
Turnout		668	40.1	
Registered electors		1,668		
Liberal Democrats gain from Conservative				

=== Great Barton ===
Great Barton
Party	Candidate	Votes	%	±%
Conservative	Sarah Broughton	553	78.4	
Liberal Democrats	Christine Stainer	152	21.6	
Majority		401	56.8	
Turnout		705	41.1	
Registered electors		1,719		
Conservative hold				

=== Haverhill East ===
Haverhill East (3 seats)
Party	Candidate	Votes	%	±%
Conservative	Les Ager	637	50.6	
Conservative	Karen Richardson	581	46.1	
Conservative	Gordon Cox	507	40.3	
Labour	Patrick Hanlon*	327	26.0	
Labour	Ann Samuels	317	25.2	
Liberal Democrats	Mick Graham	228	18.1	
Liberal Democrats	Steve Harris	223	17.7	
Liberal Democrats	Philip Graham	198	15.7	
Green	Ernie Goody*	192	15.2	
Turnout		~1,259	24.8	
Registered electors		5,078		
Conservative gain from Labour				
Conservative gain from Labour				
Conservative gain from Labour				

=== Haverhill North ===
Haverhill North (3 seats)
Party	Candidate	Votes	%	±%
Conservative	Anne Gower	687	55.4	
Conservative	Paul McManus	683	55.1	
Conservative	Ted Trebble	646	52.1	
Labour	Maureen Byrne	404	32.6	
Labour	Ann Thomas*	395	31.9	
Labour	Phillip French*	359	28.9	
Liberal Democrats	Michael Karim	162	13.1	
Turnout		~1,240	23.8	
Registered electors		5,211		
Conservative gain from Labour				
Conservative gain from Labour				
Conservative gain from Labour				

=== Haverhill South ===
Haverhill South (2 seats)
Party	Candidate	Votes	%	±%
Conservative	Jack Anderson	308	45.6	
Conservative	Gavin Price	307	45.4	
Labour	George Hatchell	253	37.4	
Labour	Mary Martin*	247	36.5	
Liberal Democrats	Joyce Jones	96	14.2	
Liberal Democrats	Christina Skryzypczak	64	9.5	
Turnout		~676	19.0	
Registered electors		3,558		
Conservative gain from Labour				
Conservative gain from Labour				

=== Haverhill West ===
Haverhill West (2 seats)
Party	Candidate	Votes	%	±%
Conservative	Jeremy Farthing*	Unopposed		
Conservative	Adam Whittaker*	Unopposed		
Registered electors		3,623		
Conservative hold				
Conservative hold				

=== Horringer & Whelnetham ===
Horringer & Whelnetham
Party	Candidate	Votes	%	±%
Conservative	Terry Clements*	450	64.5	
Labour	Robin Davies	126	18.1	
Liberal Democrats	Gordon Hughes	120	17.2	
Majority		324	46.4	
Turnout		698	41.3	
Registered electors		1,689		
Conservative hold				

=== Hundon ===
Hundon
Party	Candidate	Votes	%	±%
Conservative	Dorothy Whittaker*	Unopposed		
Registered electors		1,729		
Conservative hold				

=== Ixworth ===
Ixworth
Party	Candidate	Votes	%	±%
Conservative	John Griffiths*	434	67.6	
Independent	Snowy Snowdon	111	17.3	
Liberal Democrats	Steve Cannon	94	14.6	
Majority		323	50.3	
Turnout		642	38.3	
Registered electors		1,675		
Conservative hold				

=== Kedington ===
Kedington
Party	Candidate	Votes	%	±%
Conservative	Marion Rushbrook	420	63.1	
Liberal Democrats	Terry McNally	140	21.0	
Labour	Michael Simpkin	61	9.2	
UKIP	Arthur Nightingale	45	6.8	
Majority		280	42.1	
Turnout		666	43.7	
Registered electors		1,525		
Conservative hold				

=== Minden ===
Minden (2 seats)
Party	Candidate	Votes	%	±%
Conservative	Margaret Charlesworth*	826	59.7	
Conservative	Robert Everitt	671	48.5	
Labour	Kevin Waterson	500	36.1	
Labour	Kevin Hind	464	33.5	
Turnout		~1,383	38.7	
Registered electors		3,574		
Conservative hold				
Conservative hold				

=== Moreton Hall ===
Moreton Hall (3 seats)
Party	Candidate	Votes	%	±%
Independent	Trevor Beckwith*	837	54.0	
Conservative	Frank Warby*	782	50.4	
Conservative	Terry Buckle*	758	48.9	
Conservative	Clive Springett	586	37.8	
Liberal Democrats	Brian Wesley	403	26.0	
Liberal Democrats	Geoff Hills	402	25.9	
Turnout		~1,551	31.9	
Registered electors		4,862		
Independent gain from Labour				
Conservative hold				
Conservative hold				

=== Northgate ===
Northgate
Party	Candidate	Votes	%	±%
Labour	David Lockwood*	334	65.7	
Conservative	Ella Wood	174	34.3	
Majority		160	31.5	
Turnout		508	28.4	
Registered electors		1,810		
Labour hold				

=== Pakenham ===
Pakenham
Party	Candidate	Votes	%	±%
Conservative	Christopher Spicer*	423	71.6	
Liberal Democrats	Richard Stainer	168	28.4	
Majority		255	43.1	
Turnout		591	34.2	
Registered electors		1,739		
Conservative hold				

=== Risby ===
Risby
Party	Candidate	Votes	%	±%
Conservative	Helen Levack*	482	66.8	
Liberal Democrats	Christopher Tidman	150	20.8	
Labour	Liz Millwood	90	12.5	
Majority		332	46.0	
Turnout		722	38.4	
Registered electors		1,881		
Conservative hold				

=== Risbygate ===
Risbygate (2 seats)
Party	Candidate	Votes	%	±%
Independent	David Nettleton*	548	52.4	
Conservative	Christopher Turner	381	36.4	
Conservative	Paul Simner	373	35.7	
Labour	Cliff Hind	232	22.2	
Labour	Robert Corfe	231	22.1	
Turnout		~1,047	31.6	
Registered electors		3,312		
Independent hold				
Conservative hold				

=== Rougham ===
Rougham
Party	Candidate	Votes	%	±%
Conservative	Sara Mildmay-White*	524	80.6	
Labour	Adrian Grenville	126	19.4	
Majority		398	61.2	
Turnout		650	38.5	
Registered electors		1,714		
Conservative hold				

=== Southgate ===
Southgate (2 seats)
Party	Candidate	Votes	%	±%
Liberal Democrats	Charles Bradbury*	730	54.0	
Liberal Democrats	Allan Jones*	700	51.8	
Conservative	James Dinsdale	613	45.4	
Conservative	Georgina Kennedy	597	44.2	
Turnout		~1,351	41.1	
Registered electors		3,288		
Liberal Democrats hold				
Liberal Democrats hold				

=== St. Olaves ===
St. Olaves (2 seats)
Party	Candidate	Votes	%	±%
Labour	Bob Cockle*	496	62.9	
Labour	Mark Ereira	444	56.3	
Conservative	George Cockram	244	31.0	
Conservative	Hugh Tracy-Forster	230	29.2	
Turnout		~788	23.9	
Registered electors		3,299		
Labour hold				
Labour hold				

=== Stanton ===
Stanton
Party	Candidate	Votes	%	±%
Conservative	Jim Thorndyke*	529	77.5	
Liberal Democrats	Mary Toulson	152	22.3	
Majority		377	55.2	
Turnout		683	35.7	
Registered electors		1,912		
Conservative hold				

=== Westgate ===
Westgate (2 seats)
Party	Candidate	Votes	%	±%
Conservative	Lynsey Alexander	623	45.8	
Conservative	Stephen Oliver*	614	45.2	
Liberal Democrats	Daniel Warren	587	43.2	
Liberal Democrats	Elizabeth Jones	584	43.0	
Turnout		~1,359	40.2	
Registered electors		3,381		
Conservative hold				
Conservative hold				

=== Wickhambrook ===
Wickhambrook
Party	Candidate	Votes	%	±%
Independent	Derek Redhead*	388	52.8	
Conservative	Christine Kennedy	255	34.7	
Liberal Democrats	Ken Rolph	92	12.5	
Majority		133	18.1	
Turnout		735	43.0	
Registered electors		1,710		
Independent hold				

=== Withersfield ===
Withersfield
Party	Candidate	Votes	%	±%
Conservative	Robert Clifton-Brown*	Unopposed		
Registered electors		1,573		
Conservative hold				

== By-elections ==
=== Haverhill North ===
Haverhill North by-election: 20 March 2008
Party	Candidate	Votes	%	±%
Conservative		426	62.6	
Labour		255	37.4	
Majority		171	25.2	
Turnout		681	13.8	
Registered electors		4,935		
Conservative hold		Swing		
