= 1987 St Edmundsbury Borough Council election =

UK local election

- 7 May 1987

All 44 seats to St Edmundsbury Borough Council 23 seats needed for a majority

	First party	Second party
Party	Conservative	Labour
Seats won	31	8
Seat change	▲1	▼1
Popular vote	16,195	8,797
Percentage	47.0%	25.5%
Swing	▼5.6%	▼2.0%
	Third party	Fourth party
Party	Alliance	Independent
Seats won	4	1
Seat change	▲1	▼1
Popular vote	8,527	142
Percentage	24.7%	0.4%
Swing	▲8.2%	▼1.3%
- Winner of each seat at the 1987 St Edmundsbury Borough Council election.
Council control before election
Conservative
Council control after election
Conservative

The 1987 St Edmundsbury Borough Council election took place on 7 May 1987 to elect members of St Edmundsbury Borough Council in Suffolk, England. This was on the same day as other local elections.

== Summary ==
=== Election result ===
1987 St Edmundsbury Borough Council election
Party	Candidates	Seats	Gains	Losses	Net gain/loss	Seats %	Votes %	Votes	+/−
Conservative	37	31			▲1	70.5	47.0	16,195	–5.6
Labour	26	8			▼1	18.2	25.5	8,797	–2.0
Alliance	19	4			▲1	9.1	24.7	8,527	+8.2
Independent	2	1			▼1	2.3	0.4	142	–1.3
Green	4	0			Steady	0.0	2.4	811	+0.7

== Ward results ==
Incumbent councillors standing for re-election are marked with an asterisk (*). Changes in seats do not take into account by-elections or defections.

=== Abbeygate ===
Abbeygate (2 seats)
Party	Candidate	Votes	%	±%
Conservative	F. Jepson*	638	40.6	
Conservative	A. Biggs*	638	40.6	
Alliance	A. Bignell	493	31.4	
Green	J. Wakelam	241	15.3	
Labour	F. Roberts	200	12.7	
Labour	M. Roberts	196	12.5	
Turnout		~1,572	58.6	
Registered electors		2,684		
Conservative hold				
Conservative hold				

=== Barningham ===
Barningham
Party	Candidate	Votes	%	±%
Conservative	J. Wallace	657	80.3	
Green	M. Monaco	161	19.7	
Majority		496	60.6	
Turnout		818	49.0	
Registered electors		1,669		
Conservative hold				

=== Barrow ===
Barrow
Party	Candidate	Votes	%	±%
Conservative	P. English*	486	61.9	
Green	C. Southall	299	38.1	
Majority		187	23.8	
Turnout		785	54.5	
Registered electors		1,441		
Conservative hold				

=== Cangle ===
Cangle (2 seats)
Party	Candidate	Votes	%	±%
Conservative	B. Atkinson	781	43.3	
Labour	J. Hartley	587	32.6	
Labour	G. Kiernan*	556	30.8	
Alliance	C. Crane	435	24.1	
Turnout		~1,803	46.7	
Registered electors		3,857		
Conservative hold				
Labour hold				

=== Castle ===
Castle
Party	Candidate	Votes	%	±%
Labour	W. Elkins*	304	53.8	
Alliance	A. Walker	261	46.2	
Majority		43	7.6	
Turnout		565	30.2	
Registered electors		1,868		
Labour hold				

=== Cavendish ===
Cavendish
Party	Candidate	Votes	%	±%
Conservative	J. Wayman*	Unopposed		
Registered electors		1,302		
Conservative hold				

=== Chalkstone ===
Chalkstone (2 seats)
Party	Candidate	Votes	%	±%
Conservative	M. Richards*	689	45.4	
Alliance	J. Jones	446	29.4	
Labour	M. Byrne	384	25.3	
Labour	D. McCrossen	311	20.5	
Turnout		~1,519	41.0	
Registered electors		3,706		
Conservative hold				
Alliance gain from Labour				

=== Chevington ===
Chevington
Party	Candidate	Votes	%	±%
Conservative	N. Aitkens*	572	59.5	
Alliance	M. McCormack	390	40.5	
Majority		182	18.9	
Turnout		962	61.5	
Registered electors		1,477		
Conservative hold				

=== Clare ===
Clare
Party	Candidate	Votes	%	±%
Conservative	J. Bone*	Unopposed		
Registered electors		1,540		
Conservative hold				

=== Clements ===
Clements (2 seats)
Party	Candidate	Votes	%	±%
Labour	M. O'Neill	499	47.4	
Labour	M. Martin	440	41.8	
Conservative	M. Elliott	314	29.8	
Alliance	P. O'Garvaigh	239	22.7	
Turnout		~1,052	41.0	
Registered electors		2,568		
Labour hold				
Labour hold				

=== Eastgate ===
Eastgate (2 seats)
Party	Candidate	Votes	%	±%
Conservative	B. Jennings*	702	47.4	
Conservative	R. Self*	662	44.7	
Alliance	S. Tamlyn	584	39.4	
Alliance	L. Green	512	34.6	
Labour	K. Smith	195	13.2	
Labour	D. Williams	194	13.1	
Turnout		~1,481	48.5	
Registered electors		3,052		
Conservative hold				
Conservative hold				

=== Fornham ===
Fornham
Party	Candidate	Votes	%	±%
Conservative	J. Warren*	576	74.6	
Labour	R. Nowak	196	25.4	
Majority		380	49.2	
Turnout		772	42.9	
Registered electors		1,800		
Conservative hold				

=== Great Barton ===
Great Barton
Party	Candidate	Votes	%	±%
Conservative	L. Griffiths	481	51.8	
Alliance	G. Ellis	403	43.4	
Labour	P. Khan	45	4.8	
Majority		78	8.4	
Turnout		929	59.9	
Registered electors		1,551		
Conservative hold				

=== Honington ===
Honington
Party	Candidate	Votes	%	±%
Conservative	G. Starling*	317	69.1	
Independent	W. Tidy	142	30.9	
Majority		175	38.1	
Turnout		459	39.5	
Registered electors		1,162		
Conservative hold				

=== Horringer ===
Horringer (2 seats)
Party	Candidate	Votes	%	±%
Conservative	H. Dutson*	Unopposed		
Conservative	P. Underwood*	Unopposed		
Registered electors		2,887		
Conservative hold				
Conservative hold				

=== Hundon ===
Hundon
Party	Candidate	Votes	%	±%
Conservative	M. Warwick	Unopposed		
Registered electors		1,631		
Conservative hold				

=== Ixworth ===
Ixworth
Party	Candidate	Votes	%	±%
Conservative	F. Robinson	583	71.6	
Labour	M. Potter	231	28.4	
Majority		352	43.2	
Turnout		814	44.0	
Registered electors		1,830		
Conservative hold				

=== Kedington ===
Kedington
Party	Candidate	Votes	%	±%
Alliance	C. Jones*	602	61.4	
Conservative	G. Rushbrook	299	30.5	
Labour	P. Conneely	80	8.2	
Majority		303	30.9	
Turnout		981	65.6	
Registered electors		1,495		
Alliance hold				

=== Northgate ===
Northgate (2 seats)
Party	Candidate	Votes	%	±%
Labour	D. Lockwood*	636	64.6	
Labour	E. Steele*	618	62.8	
Conservative	A. Veal	348	35.4	
Turnout		~984	40.5	
Registered electors		2,431		
Labour hold				
Labour hold				

=== Pakenham ===
Pakenham
Party	Candidate	Votes	%	±%
Conservative	J. Whitwell*	364	55.2	
Labour	S. Robinson	186	28.2	
Green	R. Anstee-Parry	110	16.7	
Majority		178	27.0	
Turnout		660	44.3	
Registered electors		1,491		
Conservative gain from Independent				

=== Risby ===
Risby
Party	Candidate	Votes	%	±%
Conservative	W. Conran*	Unopposed		
Registered electors		1,464		
Conservative hold				

=== Risbygate ===
Risbygate (2 seats)
Party	Candidate	Votes	%	±%
Conservative	H. Marsh*	530	57.4	
Conservative	E. Spooner	507	54.9	
Alliance	A. Wapshott	394	42.6	
Alliance	M. Wapshott	382	41.3	
Turnout		~924	34.1	
Registered electors		2,706		
Conservative hold				
Conservative hold				

=== Rougham ===
Rougham
Party	Candidate	Votes	%	±%
Independent	T. May*	Unopposed		
Registered electors		1,438		
Independent hold				

=== Sextons ===
Sextons (2 seats)
Party	Candidate	Votes	%	±%
Conservative	J. Knight*	836	63.9	
Conservative	R. Palmer	835	63.8	
Labour	A. Brewer	473	36.1	
Labour	P. Brewer	456	34.9	
Turnout		~1,309	47.0	
Registered electors		2,783		
Conservative hold				
Conservative hold				

=== Southgate ===
Southgate (2 seats)
Party	Candidate	Votes	%	±%
Alliance	J. Williams*	1,021	56.0	
Alliance	M. Robinson	809	44.4	
Conservative	A. Paterson	627	34.4	
Conservative	M. Brundle	606	33.2	
Labour	A. Miller	174	9.5	
Turnout		~1,823	52.6	
Registered electors		3,467		
Alliance hold				
Alliance hold				

=== St. Marys & Helions ===
St. Marys & Helions
Party	Candidate	Votes	%	±%
Conservative	A. Horrigan*	284	52.8	
Alliance	C. Gren	142	26.4	
Labour	J. McCrossen	112	20.8	
Majority		142	26.4	
Turnout		538	42.6	
Registered electors		1,262		
Conservative hold				

=== St. Olaves ===
St. Olaves (2 seats)
Party	Candidate	Votes	%	±%
Labour	S. Wormleighton*	772	73.5	
Labour	W. Cownley*	638	60.8	
Conservative	M. Stonehouse	279	26.5	
Turnout		~1,050	36.2	
Registered electors		2,903		
Labour hold				
Labour hold				

=== Stanton ===
Stanton
Party	Candidate	Votes	%	±%
Conservative	P. Rudge*	505	57.1	
Alliance	T. Cook	380	42.9	
Majority		125	14.2	
Turnout		885	45.0	
Registered electors		1,966		
Conservative hold				

=== Westgate ===
Westgate (2 seats)
Party	Candidate	Votes	%	±%
Conservative	W. Cutting*	760	54.9	
Conservative	D. Kempson*	748	54.1	
Alliance	R. Corfe	429	31.0	
Alliance	I. Norris	420	30.4	
Labour	M. Marshall	196	14.2	
Turnout		~1,385	49.4	
Registered electors		2,802		
Conservative hold				
Conservative hold				

=== Whelnetham ===
Whelnetham
Party	Candidate	Votes	%	±%
Conservative	T. Clements*	571	65.3	
Alliance	J. Gill	185	21.2	
Labour	M. Kilner	118	13.5	
Majority		386	44.1	
Turnout		874	55.7	
Registered electors		1,569		
Conservative hold				

=== Wickhambrook ===
Wickhambrook
Party	Candidate	Votes	%	±%
Conservative	J. Long*	Unopposed		
Registered electors		1,531		
Conservative hold				

=== Withersfield ===
Withersfield
Party	Candidate	Votes	%	±%
Conservative	J. Mowbray*	Unopposed		
Registered electors		1,290		
Conservative hold				

== By-elections ==
=== Horringer ===
Horringer by-election: 10 September 1987
Party	Candidate	Votes	%	±%
Conservative		377	47.6	
Alliance		163	20.6	
Independent		96	12.1	
Independent		88	11.1	
Independent		68	8.6	
Majority		214	27.0	
Turnout		792	26.2	
Registered electors		3,023		
Conservative hold		Swing		

=== Westgate ===
Westgate by-election: 19 May 1988
Party	Candidate	Votes	%	±%
Conservative		606	63.3	
Labour		352	36.7	
Majority		254	26.5	
Turnout		958	33.7	
Registered electors		2,843		
Conservative hold		Swing		

=== Great Barton ===
Great Barton by-election: 30 March 1989
Party	Candidate	Votes	%	±%
Conservative		358	46.5	
Alliance		353	45.8	
Labour		59	7.7	
Majority		5	0.7	
Turnout		770	45.7	
Registered electors		1,685		
Conservative hold		Swing		

=== Withersfield ===
Withersfield by-election: 15 June 1989
Party	Candidate	Votes	%	±%
Conservative		Unopposed		
Registered electors		1,290		
Conservative hold				
