= 1991 St Edmundsbury Borough Council election =

1991 English local government election

- 2 May 1991

All 44 seats to St Edmundsbury Borough Council 23 seats needed for a majority

	First party	Second party
Party	Conservative	Labour
Seats won	20	11
Seat change	▼11	▲3
Popular vote	11,674	12,243
Percentage	35.1%	36.8%
Swing	▼11.9%	▲11.3%
	Third party	Fourth party
Party	Independent	Liberal Democrats
Seats won	8	5
Seat change	▲7	▲1
Popular vote	3,642	5,098
Percentage	10.9%	15.3%
Swing	▲10.5%	▼9.4%
- Winner of each seat at the 1991 St Edmundsbury Borough Council election.
Control before election
Conservative
Control after election
No overall control

The 1991 St Edmundsbury Borough Council election took place on 2 May 1991 to elect members of St Edmundsbury Borough Council in Suffolk, England. This was on the same day as other local elections.

== Summary ==
=== Election result ===
1991 St Edmundsbury Borough Council election
Party	Candidates	Seats	Gains	Losses	Net gain/loss	Seats %	Votes %	Votes	+/−
Conservative	30	20	0	11	▼11	45.5	35.1	11,674	–11.9
Labour	38	11	3	0	▲3	25.0	36.8	12,243	+11.3
Independent	11	8	7	0	▲7	18.2	10.9	3,642	+10.5
Liberal Democrats	9	5	2	1	▲1	11.4	15.3	5,098	–9.4
Green	3	0	0	0	Steady	0.0	1.9	620	–0.5

== Ward results ==
Incumbent councillors standing for re-election are marked with an asterisk (*). Changes in seats do not take into account by-elections or defections.

=== Abbeygate ===
Abbeygate (2 seats)
Party	Candidate	Votes	%	±%
Conservative	F. Jepson*	478	34.3	
Independent	M. Ames	460	33.0	
Conservative	A. Biggs*	390	28.0	
Labour	M. Roberts	230	16.5	
Green	I. Wakelam	227	16.3	
Independent	D. Norman	220	15.8	
Labour	P. Smithers	166	11.9	
Turnout		~1,232	44.3	
Registered electors		2,782		
Conservative hold				
Independent gain from Conservative				

=== Barningham ===
Barningham
Party	Candidate	Votes	%	±%
Conservative	J. Wallace*	519	69.1	
Green	T. Meldrum	232	30.9	
Majority		287	38.2	
Turnout		751	42.7	
Registered electors		1,760		
Conservative hold				

=== Barrow ===
Barrow
Party	Candidate	Votes	%	±%
Independent	P. English*	423	64.5	
Labour	S. Rosenoff	233	35.5	
Majority		190	29.0	
Turnout		656	44.1	
Registered electors		1,484		
Independent gain from Conservative				

=== Cangle ===
Cangle (2 seats)
Party	Candidate	Votes	%	±%
Labour	L. Kierman	769	52.6	
Labour	J. Hartley*	702	48.0	
Conservative	R. Gunn	694	47.4	
Turnout		~1,462	34.4	
Registered electors		4,251		
Labour gain from Conservative				
Labour hold				

=== Castle ===
Castle
Party	Candidate	Votes	%	±%
Labour	D. Hall*	Unopposed		
Registered electors		2,128		
Labour hold				

=== Cavendish ===
Cavendish
Party	Candidate	Votes	%	±%
Conservative	J. Wayman*	Unopposed		
Registered electors		1,340		
Conservative hold				

=== Chalkstone ===
Chalkstone (2 seats)
Party	Candidate	Votes	%	±%
Liberal Democrats	C. Jones	959	55.2	
Liberal Democrats	J. Jones*	728	41.9	
Labour	E. Elkins	392	22.6	
Conservative	M. Richards*	386	22.2	
Labour	L. Hall	339	19.5	
Turnout		~1,402	32.4	
Registered electors		4,328		
Liberal Democrats gain from Conservative				
Liberal Democrats hold				

=== Chevington ===
Chevington
Party	Candidate	Votes	%	±%
Conservative	N. Aitkens*	420	46.3	
Liberal Democrats	M. McCormack	401	44.2	
Labour	K. Tippell	86	9.5	
Majority		19	2.1	
Turnout		907	59.8	
Registered electors		1,524		
Conservative hold				

=== Clare ===
Clare
Party	Candidate	Votes	%	±%
Conservative	J. Bone*	Unopposed		
Registered electors		1,560		
Conservative hold				

=== Clements ===
Clements (2 seats)
Party	Candidate	Votes	%	±%
Labour	M. O'Neill	Unopposed		
Labour	M. Martin*	Unopposed		
Registered electors		2,599		
Labour hold				
Labour hold				

=== Eastgate ===
Eastgate (2 seats)
Party	Candidate	Votes	%	±%
Conservative	I. Speakman*	717	45.9	
Conservative	H. Godfrey*	695	44.5	
Labour	P. Williams	369	23.6	
Labour	G. Hanger	349	22.3	
Liberal Democrats	B. Wesley	315	20.2	
Green	R. Isaac	161	10.3	
Turnout		~1,484	39.9	
Registered electors		3,719		
Conservative hold				
Conservative hold				

=== Fornham ===
Fornham
Party	Candidate	Votes	%	±%
Independent	J. Warren*	596	69.5	
Labour	J. Brabrook	261	30.5	
Majority		335	39.1	
Turnout		857	43.1	
Registered electors		1,988		
Independent gain from Conservative				

=== Great Barton ===
Great Barton
Party	Candidate	Votes	%	±%
Conservative	M. Horbury*	575	65.3	
Liberal Democrats	G. Ellis	247	28.0	
Labour	P. Khan	59	6.7	
Majority		328	37.2	
Turnout		881	53.2	
Registered electors		1,659		
Conservative hold				

=== Honington ===
Honington
Party	Candidate	Votes	%	±%
Independent	G. Starling*	287	63.8	
Labour	M. De Koning	163	36.2	
Majority		124	27.6	
Turnout		450	37.6	
Registered electors		1,208		
Independent gain from Conservative				

=== Horringer ===
Horringer
Party	Candidate	Votes	%	±%
Conservative	J. White*	394	68.5	
Labour	R. Allen	181	31.5	
Majority		213	37.0	
Turnout		575	50.0	
Registered electors		1,150		
Conservative hold				

=== Horringer Court ===
Horringer Court
Party	Candidate	Votes	%
Liberal Democrats	A. Pridham	277	40.8
Conservative	P. Underwood*	243	35.8
Labour	R. Mallion	159	23.4
Majority		34	5.0
Turnout		679	38.9
Registered electors		1,745	
Liberal Democrats win (new seat)			

=== Hundon ===
Hundon
Party	Candidate	Votes	%	±%
Conservative	M. Warwick	Unopposed		
Registered electors		1,682		
Conservative hold				

=== Ixworth ===
Ixworth
Party	Candidate	Votes	%	±%
Conservative	F. Robinson*	500	58.8	
Labour	M. Potter	350	41.2	
Majority		150	17.6	
Turnout		850	41.8	
Registered electors		2,041		
Conservative hold				

=== Kedington ===
Kedington
Party	Candidate	Votes	%	±%
Labour	P. Edwards*	Unopposed		
Registered electors		1,329		
Labour gain from Liberal Democrats				

=== Northgate ===
Northgate (2 seats)
Party	Candidate	Votes	%	±%
Labour	D. Lockwood*	718	73.3	
Labour	E. Steele*	616	62.9	
Conservative	R. Simpson	261	26.7	
Conservative	D. Speakman	225	23.0	
Turnout		~979	39.1	
Registered electors		2,363		
Labour hold				
Labour hold				

=== Pakenham ===
Pakenham
Party	Candidate	Votes	%	±%
Independent	J. Pereira	287	57.7	
Labour	R. Wolfers	210	42.3	
Majority		77	15.5	
Turnout		497	34.7	
Registered electors		1,436		
Independent gain from Conservative				

=== Risby ===
Risby
Party	Candidate	Votes	%	±%
Conservative	K. Fisher*	462	68.2	
Labour	P. Nowak	215	31.8	
Majority		247	36.5	
Turnout		677	44.0	
Registered electors		1,488		
Conservative hold				

=== Risbygate ===
Risbygate (2 seats)
Party	Candidate	Votes	%	±%
Labour	R. O'Driscoll	428	36.4	
Conservative	E. Spooner*	412	35.0	
Conservative	A. Jary	407	34.6	
Labour	S. O'Driscoll	363	30.9	
Independent	A. Phillips	337	28.6	
Turnout		~1,176	39.5	
Registered electors		2,860		
Labour gain from Conservative				
Conservative hold				

=== Rougham ===
Rougham
Party	Candidate	Votes	%	±%
Independent	K. May*	427	77.8	
Labour	H. Parris	122	22.2	
Majority		305	55.6	
Turnout		549	40.0	
Registered electors		1,373		
Independent hold				

=== Sextons ===
Sextons (2 seats)
Party	Candidate	Votes	%	±%
Conservative	J. Hart	629	53.8	
Conservative	R. Palmer*	583	49.8	
Labour	B. Fagan	541	46.2	
Labour	R. Nowak	512	43.8	
Turnout		~1,170	45.1	
Registered electors		2,758		
Conservative hold				
Conservative hold				

=== Southgate ===
Southgate (2 seats)
Party	Candidate	Votes	%	±%
Liberal Democrats	J. Williams*	992	57.4	
Liberal Democrats	B. Bagnall	884	51.1	
Conservative	A. Hughes	497	28.8	
Labour	A. Robertson	238	13.8	
Labour	L. Goodman	182	10.5	
Turnout		~1,728	45.0	
Registered electors		3,589		
Liberal Democrats hold				
Liberal Democrats hold				

=== St. Marys & Helions ===
St. Marys & Helions
Party	Candidate	Votes	%	±%
Conservative	A. Horrigan*	236	52.0	
Labour	M. Byrne	218	48.0	
Majority		18	4.0	
Turnout		454	34.3	
Registered electors		1,337		
Conservative hold				

=== St. Olaves ===
St. Olaves (2 seats)
Party	Candidate	Votes	%	±%
Labour	S. Wormleighton*	853	84.5	
Labour	W. Cownley*	804	79.7	
Conservative	M. Stonehouse	156	15.5	
Conservative	H. Saltmarsh	153	15.2	
Turnout		~1,009	33.5	
Registered electors		3,044		
Labour hold				
Labour hold				

=== Stanton ===
Stanton
Party	Candidate	Votes	%	±%
Conservative	P. Rudge*	543	56.9	
Labour	D. Pollard	412	43.1	
Majority		131	13.8	
Turnout		955	45.1	
Registered electors		2,111		
Conservative hold				

=== Westgate ===
Westgate (2 seats)
Party	Candidate	Votes	%	±%
Conservative	M. Brundle*	658	33.9	
Independent	W. Cutting*	605	31.2	
Labour	F. Roberts	382	19.7	
Labour	C. Waterman	357	18.4	
Liberal Democrats	A. Williams	295	15.2	
Turnout		~1,940	45.9	
Registered electors		2,841		
Conservative hold				
Independent gain from Conservative				

=== Whelnetham ===
Whelnetham
Party	Candidate	Votes	%	±%
Conservative	T. Clements*	441	62.6	
Labour	M. Kilner	264	37.4	
Majority		177	25.1	
Turnout		705	42.9	
Registered electors		1,644		
Conservative hold				

=== Wickhambrook ===
Wickhambrook
Party	Candidate	Votes	%	±%
Independent	J. Long*	Unopposed		
Registered electors		1,601		
Independent gain from Conservative				

=== Withersfield ===
Withersfield
Party	Candidate	Votes	%	±%
Conservative	R. Clifton-Brown	Unopposed		
Registered electors		1,281		
Conservative hold				

== By-elections ==
=== Sextons ===
Sextons by-election: 30 July 1992
Party	Candidate	Votes	%	±%
Conservative		408	45.1	
Labour		310	34.3	
Liberal Democrats		186	20.6	
Majority		98	10.8	
Turnout		904	33.0	
Registered electors		2,739		
Conservative hold		Swing		
