= Borough of St Edmundsbury =

Former local government district in England

Coordinates: 52.2514°N 0.6968°E

St Edmundsbury Borough of St Edmundsbury
- Borough & Non-metropolitan district
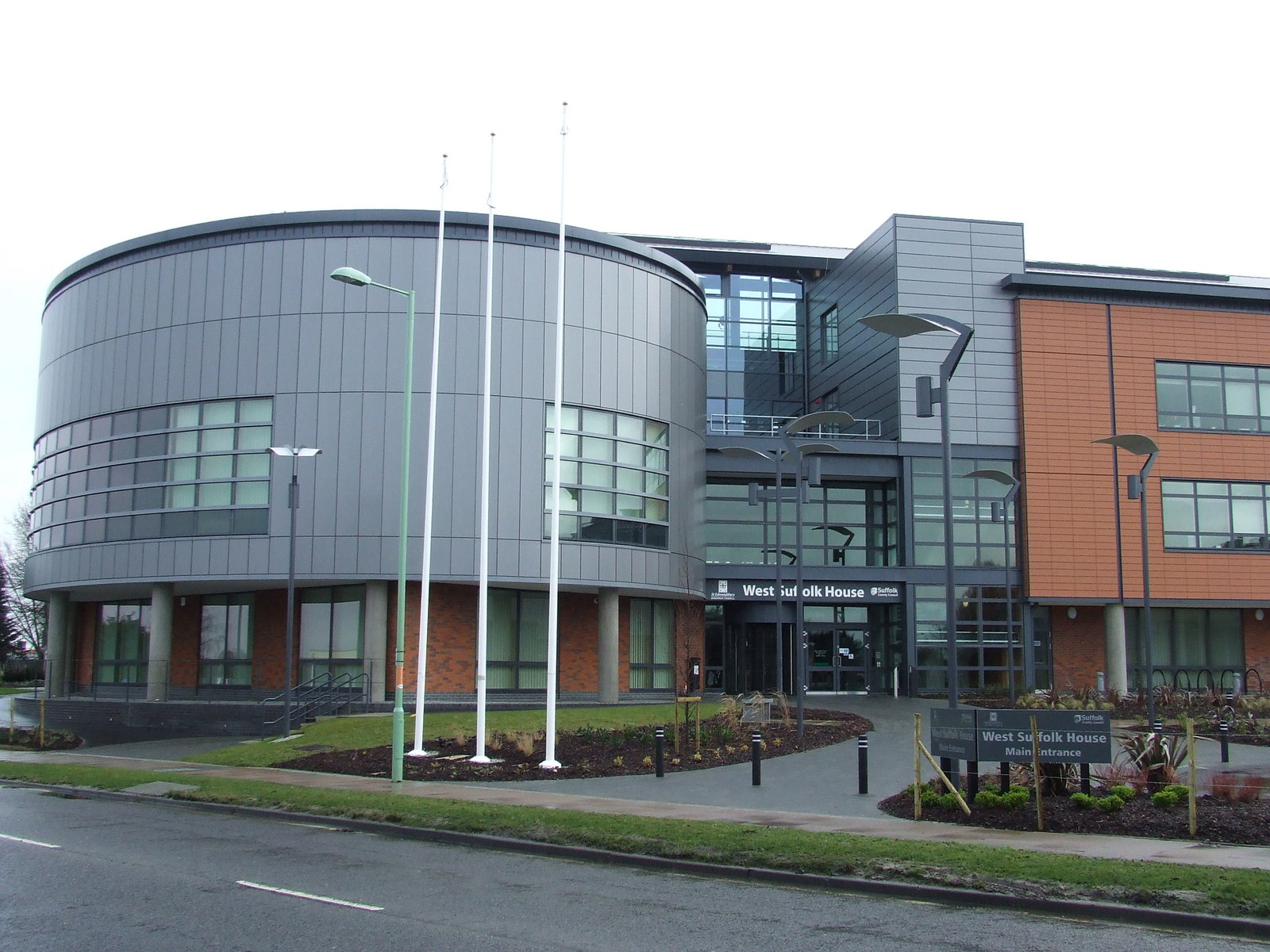
- West Suffolk House in Bury St Edmunds, the seat of the council

- St Edmundsbury shown within Suffolk
- Sovereign state: United Kingdom
- Constituent country: England
- Region: East of England
- Non-metropolitan county: Suffolk
- Status: Non-metropolitan district
- Admin HQ: Bury St Edmunds
- Incorporated: 1 April 1974
- Abolished: 31 March 2019

Government
  - Type: Non-metropolitan district council
  - Body: St Edmundsbury Borough Council
  - Leadership: ( )

Area
  - Total: 253.7 sq mi (657.0 km^{2})

Population (2018)
  - Total: 113,700
  - Density: 448.2/sq mi (173.1/km^{2})
  - Ethnicity: 98.0% White
- Time zone: UTC0 (GMT)
  - Summer (DST): UTC+1 (BST)
- Succeeded by: West Suffolk
- ONS code: 42UF (ONS); E07000204 (GSS)
- OS grid reference: TL8406364939
- Website: www.westsuffolk.gov.uk

St Edmundsbury was a local government district with borough status in Suffolk, England. It was named after its main town, Bury St Edmunds. The second town in the district was Haverhill. The population of the district was 111,008 at the 2011 Census.

The district was formed on 1 April 1974 under the Local Government Act 1972 (along with the abolition of the county of West Suffolk) by the merger of the Borough of Bury St Edmunds, Haverhill Urban District, Clare Rural District and Thingoe Rural District.

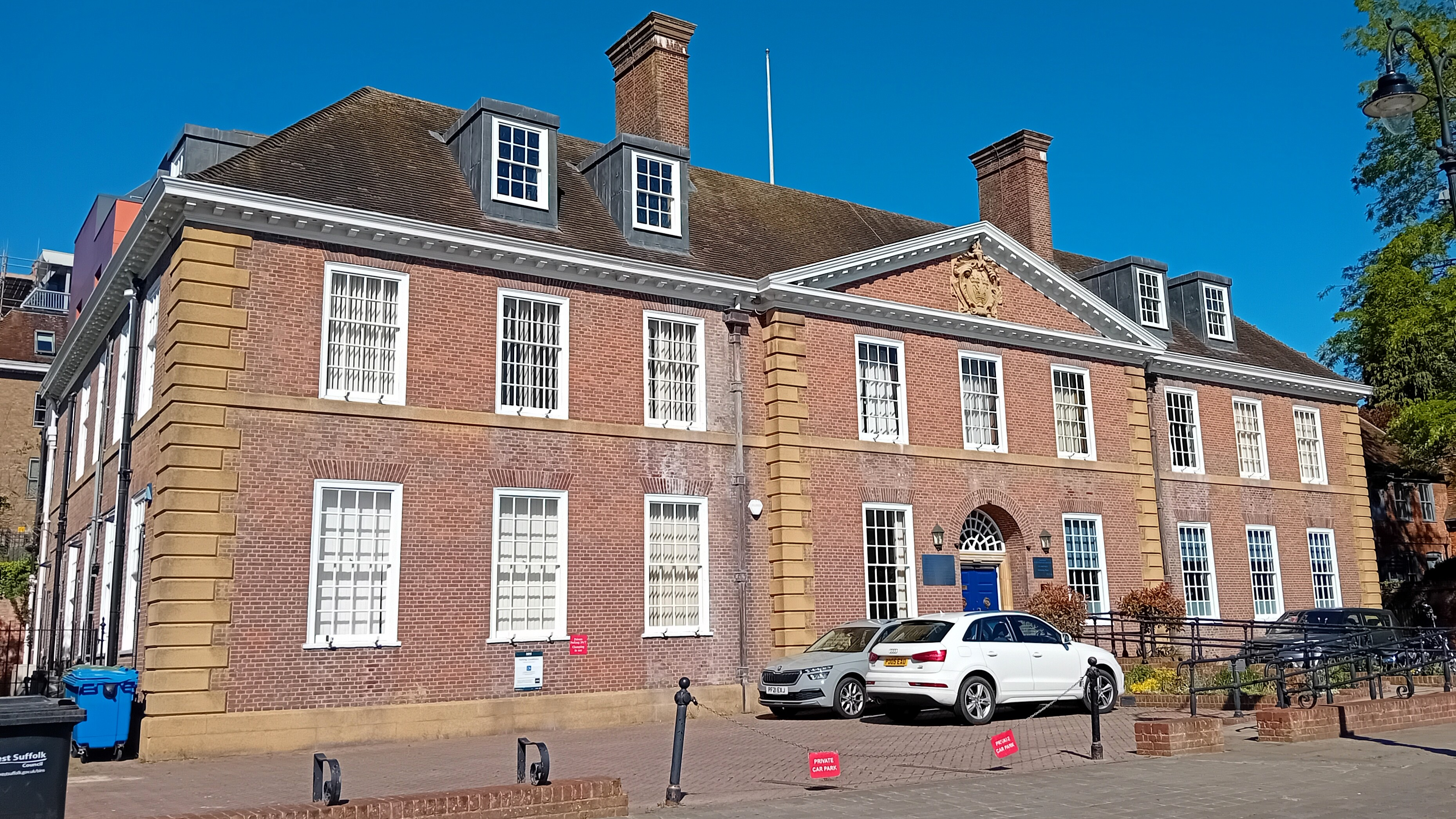
Borough Offices, Angel Hill

Until March 2009, its main offices were in Bury St Edmunds (Angel Hill and Western Way). Thereafter, a purpose-built complex named West Suffolk House housed both St Edmundsbury and Suffolk County Council staff.

In 2008, the Council submitted a proposal to the Boundary Commission which would see it as central to a new West Suffolk unitary council. However, the proposal was rejected and no unitary scheme for Suffolk was adopted. (For more details see also Suffolk.)

In October 2011, St Edmundsbury Borough Council and Forest Heath District Council agreed to have one chief executive, a shared management team and a combined workforce.

St Edmundsbury and Forest Heath were merged on 1 April 2019 to form the new West Suffolk district.

== List of communities ==
- Ampton
- Bardwell
- Barnardiston
- Barnham
- Barningham
- Barrow
- Bradfield Combust with Stanningfield
- Bradfield St Clare
- Bradfield St George
- Brockley
- Bury St Edmunds
- Cavendish
- Chedburgh
- Chevington
- Clare
- Coney Weston
- Cowlinge
- Culford
- Denham
- Denston
- Depden
- Euston
- Fakenham Magna
- Flempton
- Fornham All Saints
- Fornham St Genevieve
- Fornham St Martin
- Great Barton
- Great Bradley
- Great Livermere
- Great Thurlow
- Great Whelnetham
- Great Wratting
- Hargrave
- Haverhill
- Hawkedon
- Hawstead
- Hengrave
- Hepworth
- Honington
- Hopton
- Horringer
- Hundon
- Ickworth
- Ingham
- Ixworth
- Ixworth Thorpe
- Kedington
- Knettishall
- Lackford
- Lidgate
- Little Bradley
- Little Livermere
- Little Thurlow
- Little Whelnetham
- Little Wratting
- Market Weston
- Nowton
- Ousden
- Pakenham
- Poslingford
- Rede
- Risby
- Rushbrooke with Rougham
- Sapiston
- Stansfield
- Stanton
- Stoke-by-Clare
- Stradishall
- The Saxhams
- Thelnetham
- Timworth
- Troston
- West Stow
- Westley
- Whepstead
- Wickhambrook
- Withersfield
- Wixoe
- Wordwell

== Freedom of the Borough ==
The following people and military units have received the Freedom of the Borough of St Edmundsbury.

=== Individuals ===
- Ronald Hartley: 1999.

=== Military Units ===
- 3rd Air Force, USAF: 2000.
- The Normandy Veterans' Association (Bury St Edmunds and District Branch No35): 2004.
- 1st Battalion The Royal Anglian Regiment: 2006.
- 3 Regiment Army Air Corps (Wattisham): 2010.

== Arms ==
Coat of arms of Borough of St Edmundsbury

Crest
On a wreath of the colours upon a grassy mount a wolf sejant Proper resting the dexter paw upon a king's head couped at the neck also crowned Or.
Escutcheon
Azure a representation of the sword in its scabbard of the St Edmundsbury Borough Council Proper between in fess two pairs of arrows each in saltire points downwards Argent enfiling an ancient crown Or.
Supporters
Dexter a lion chevronny Or and Gules charged on the shoulder with a roundel Gules fretty Or sinister an ounce Sable bezanty gorged with a collar compony counter compony Argent and Azure and charged on the shoulder with a roundel Or fretty Sable.
Motto
Sacrarium Regis Cunabula Legis (Shrine of the King Cradle of the Law)

== See also ==
- St Edmundsbury local elections
