= Moulton Rural District =

Former rural district in West Suffolk, England

Coordinates: 52.24°N 0.5°E

Moulton
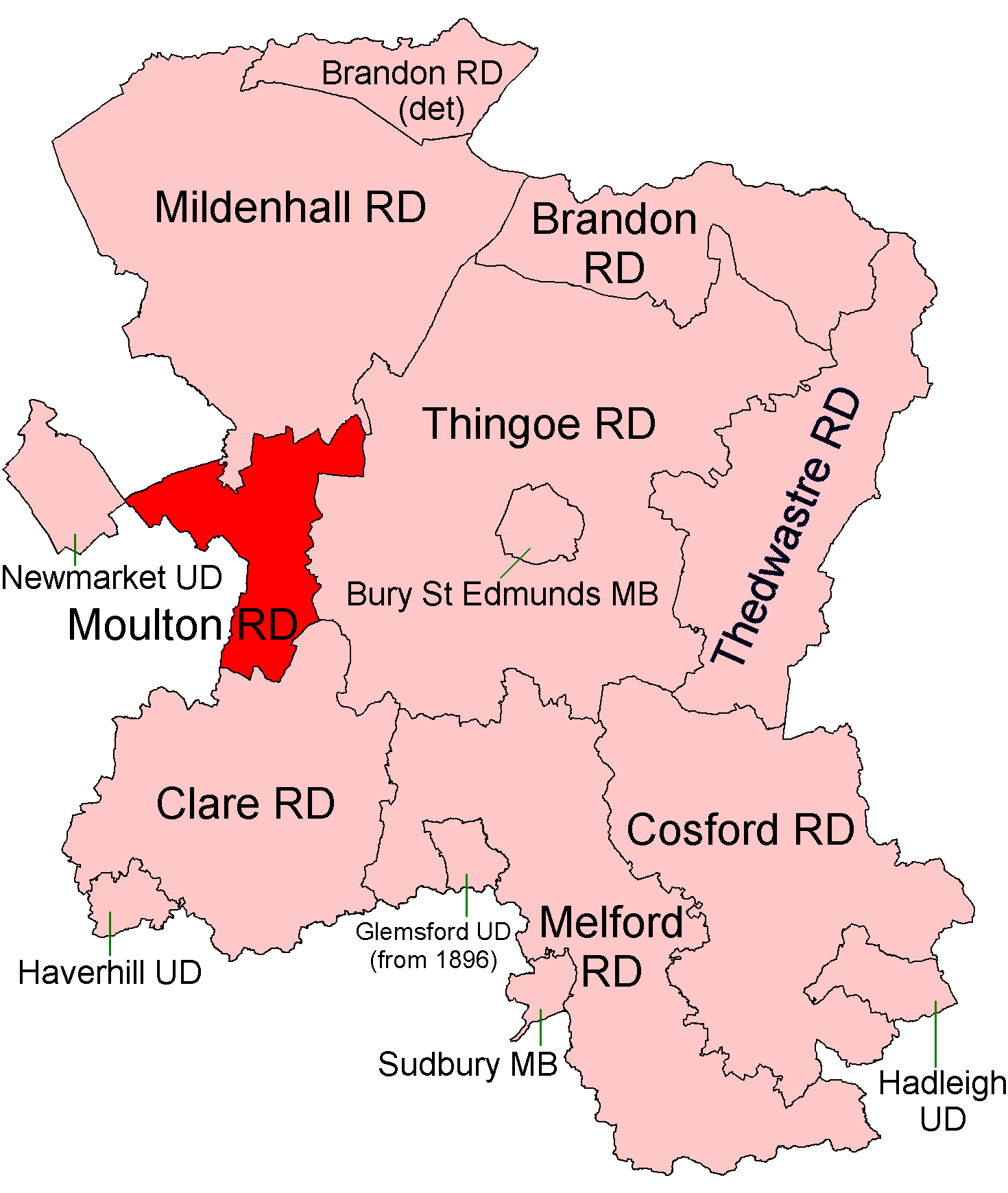
- Location within West Suffolk, 1894
- History
  - Created: 1894
  - Abolished: 1935
  - Succeeded by: Mildenhall & Clare RDs
- Status: Rural district

Moulton was a rural district in Suffolk, England from 1894 to 1935. It covered the area to the east of the town of Newmarket.

The district was created in 1894 as the part of the Newmarket rural sanitary district which lay in West Suffolk, the Cambridgeshire part becoming Newmarket Rural District.

It was abolished in 1935 and most of the district (the parishes of Dalham, Gazeley, Higham Green and Moulton) became part of Mildenhall Rural District, which merged with Newmarket urban district in 1974 to create the modern Forest Heath district. The parishes of Lidgate and Ousden instead became part of Clare Rural District in 1935, went to St Edmundsbury which is now in West Suffolk.

== Statistics ==
Year	Area		Population	Density (pop/ha)
Year	acres	ha	Population	Density (pop/ha)
1911	14,601	5,909	8,311	1.41
1921	14,601	5,909	7,990	1.35
1931	14,601	5,909	7,815	1.32
