= Newmarket Rural District =

Former local government area in the UK

Coordinates: 52.245°N 0.403°E

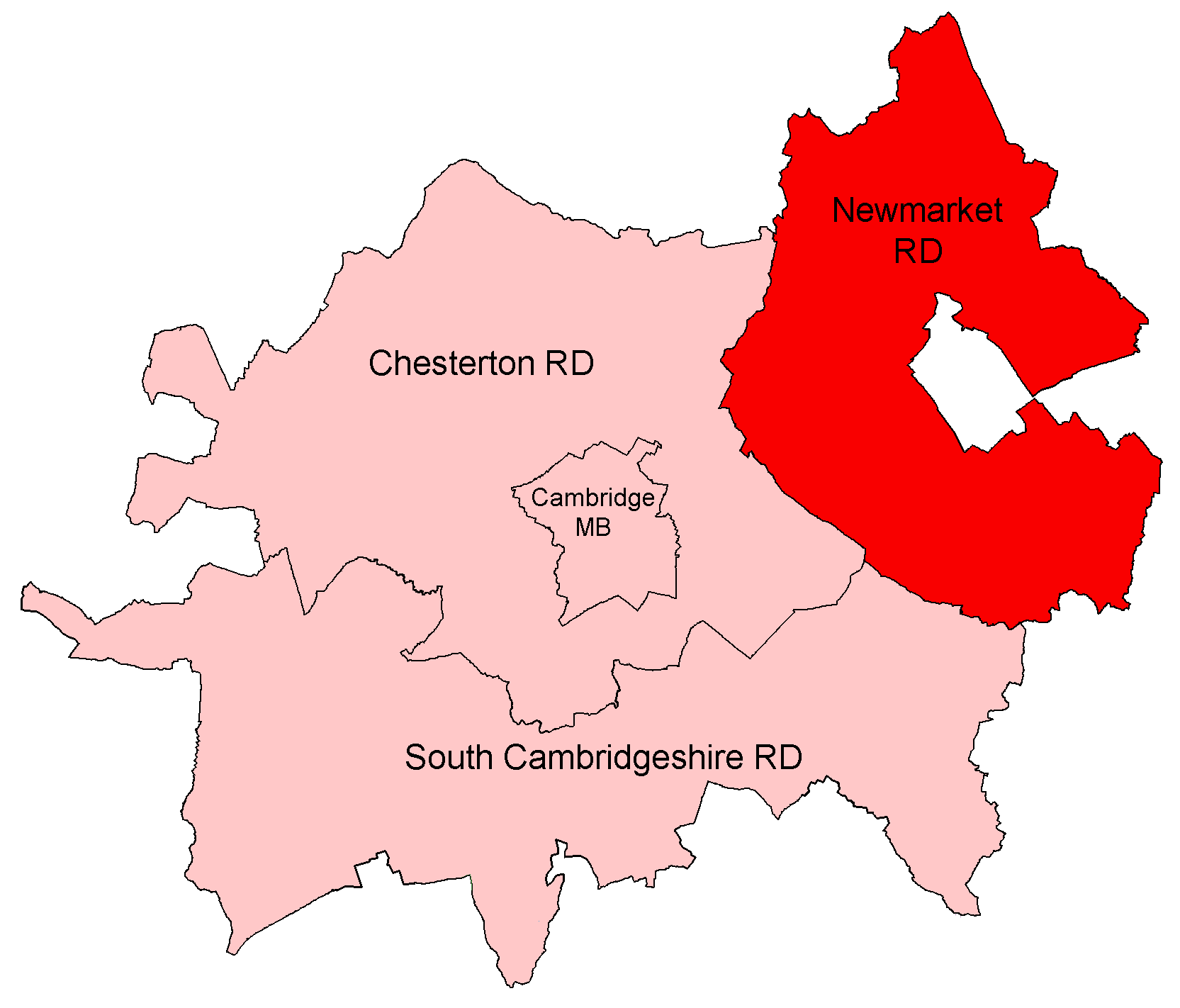
Position within Cambridgeshire

Newmarket was a rural district in Cambridgeshire, England from 1894 to 1974. It surrounded the town of Newmarket, in West Suffolk, on the north, west and south sides.

The district was created in 1894 as the Cambridgeshire part of the Newmarket rural sanitary district (the Suffolk part becoming Moulton Rural District), and included the parishes of Ashley, Bottisham, Brinkley, Burrough Green, Burwell, Cheveley, Chippenham, Fordham, Isleham, Kennett, Kirtling, Lode, Reach, Snailwell, Soham, Stetchworth, Swaffham Bulbeck, Swaffham Prior, Westley Waterless, Wicken, and Woodditton.

It was abolished in 1974 by the Local Government Act 1972 and went on to form part of the East Cambridgeshire district.
