= National Horseracing Museum =

Museum in Newmarket, Suffolk, England

Coordinates: 52.2439°N 0.4070°E

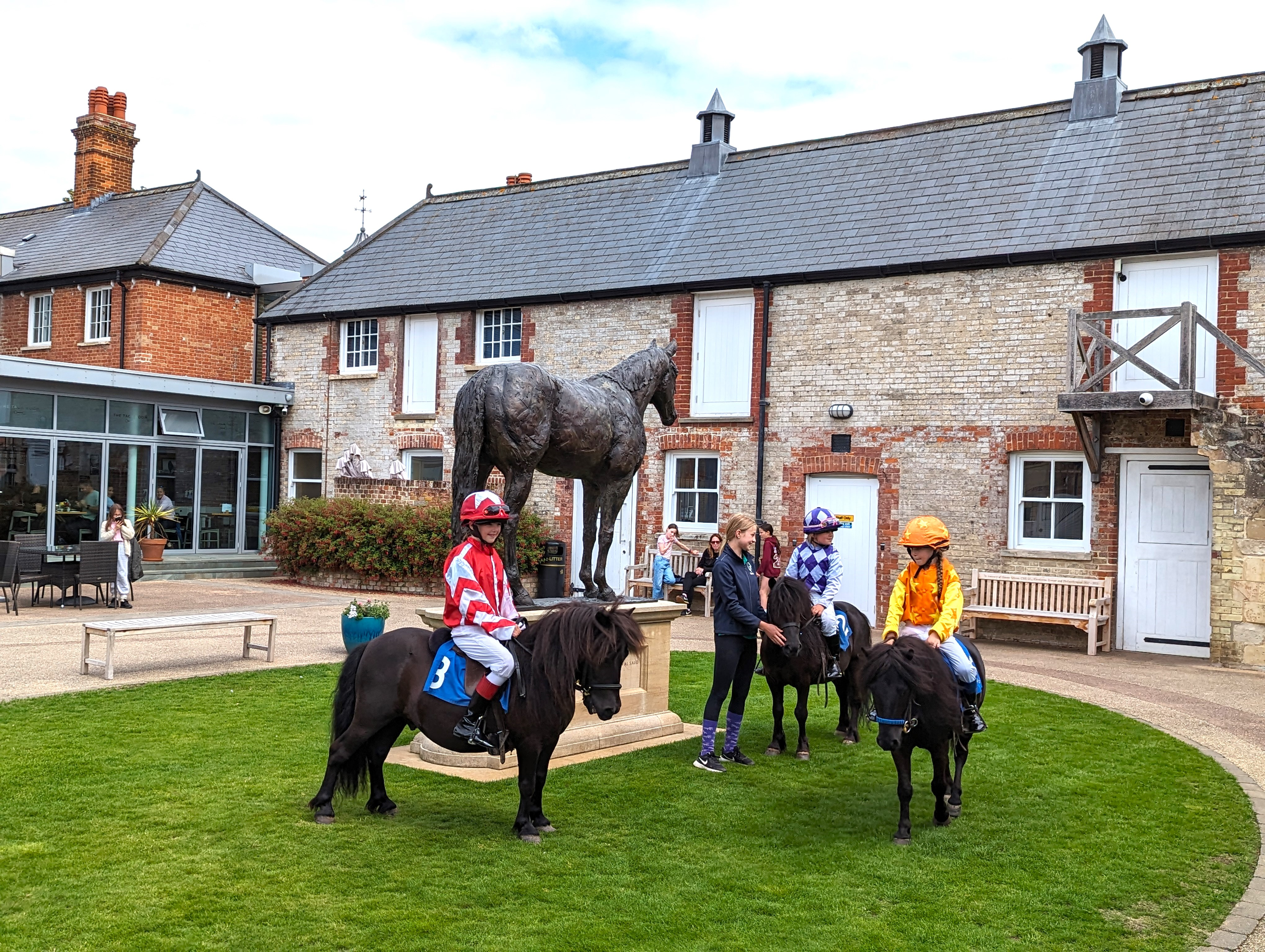
- The museum courtyard
- Established: 1986
- Location: Newmarket, Suffolk
- Type: Sporting museum
- Visitors: 18,601 (2022)
- CEO: Tracey Harding
- Website: www.nhrm.co.uk

The National Horseracing Museum (NHRM) is a museum in Newmarket dedicated to the history of horseracing. It covers a 5-acre site on Palace Street in the centre of the town, having previously been housed in the Jockey Club Rooms on Newmarket High Street. Together with the British Sporting Art Trust and Retraining of Racehorses, it is part of the National Heritage Centre for Horseracing & Sporting Art and was opened by Elizabeth II in 2016. The site includes Palace House, which is all that remains of Newmarket Palace.

== History ==
When the Subscription Rooms of the Jockey Club closed in 1981, Jockey Club handicapper Major David Swannell decided it would be the ideal place to set up a national horseracing museum. The museum was opened on 30 April 1983 by Elizabeth II. A statue of 1933 Epsom Derby winner Hyperion stood in the entrance to the museum on Newmarket High Street. In 2016 the National Horseracing Museum, together with the British Sporting Art Trust and Retraining of Racehorses, moved to their current premises in Palace Street. The three charities combined to form the National Heritage Centre for Horseracing & Sporting Art, which was opened by Elizabeth II on 3 November 2016.

The Palace Street premises occupy the site of the Newmarket palace and stables of Charles II. Only Palace House remains of the original palace, the rest having been demolished after Queen Victoria sold the property to Mayer Amschel de Rothschild in 1857. The stables of Charles II on the opposite side of Palace Street were also demolished to make way for the Trainer's House and new stables called the King's Yard Stables. In 1874 the property was inherited by Leopold de Rothschild, who in 1903 built the Rothschild Yard and Stables adjacent to the King's Yard Stables. During World War II Palace House was used to house Jewish refugees. The Palace House estate remained in the hands of the Rothschild family until 1985, when it was sold by Leopold's grandson Sir Evelyn de Rothschild.

The new owners let the buildings fall into disrepair, and in 1992 Forest Heath District Council acquired the estate with a compulsory purchase order. Palace House was restored with support from the National Lottery Heritage Fund and English Heritage and was used as a civic building. In 2005 Forest Heath District Council and the National Horseracing Museum set up the Home of Horseracing Trust to raise funds for the new centre at Palace Street. The Trust was wound up in 2020 after the completion of the project, with the new museum having opened in 2016. In May 2024, Queen Camilla became patron of the museum, succeeding Queen Elizabeth II.

== Collections and displays ==
The museum's collections and displays are housed in the Trainer's House and King's Yard Stables. Exhibits relate to the history and science of horse racing and include paintings, jockey silks worn by Lester Piggott and Frankie Dettori, a racehorse simulator which visitors can try out, and other racing memorabilia. As well as permanent displays, the museum curates temporary exhibitions, for example, the horseracing board games exhibition in 2025. There is also a gift shop and second-hand bookshop in the Trainer's House, and a cafe and restaurant and statue of Frankel in the courtyard. The museum hosts events, concerts, workshops, and activities for children.

== The British Sporting Art Trust ==
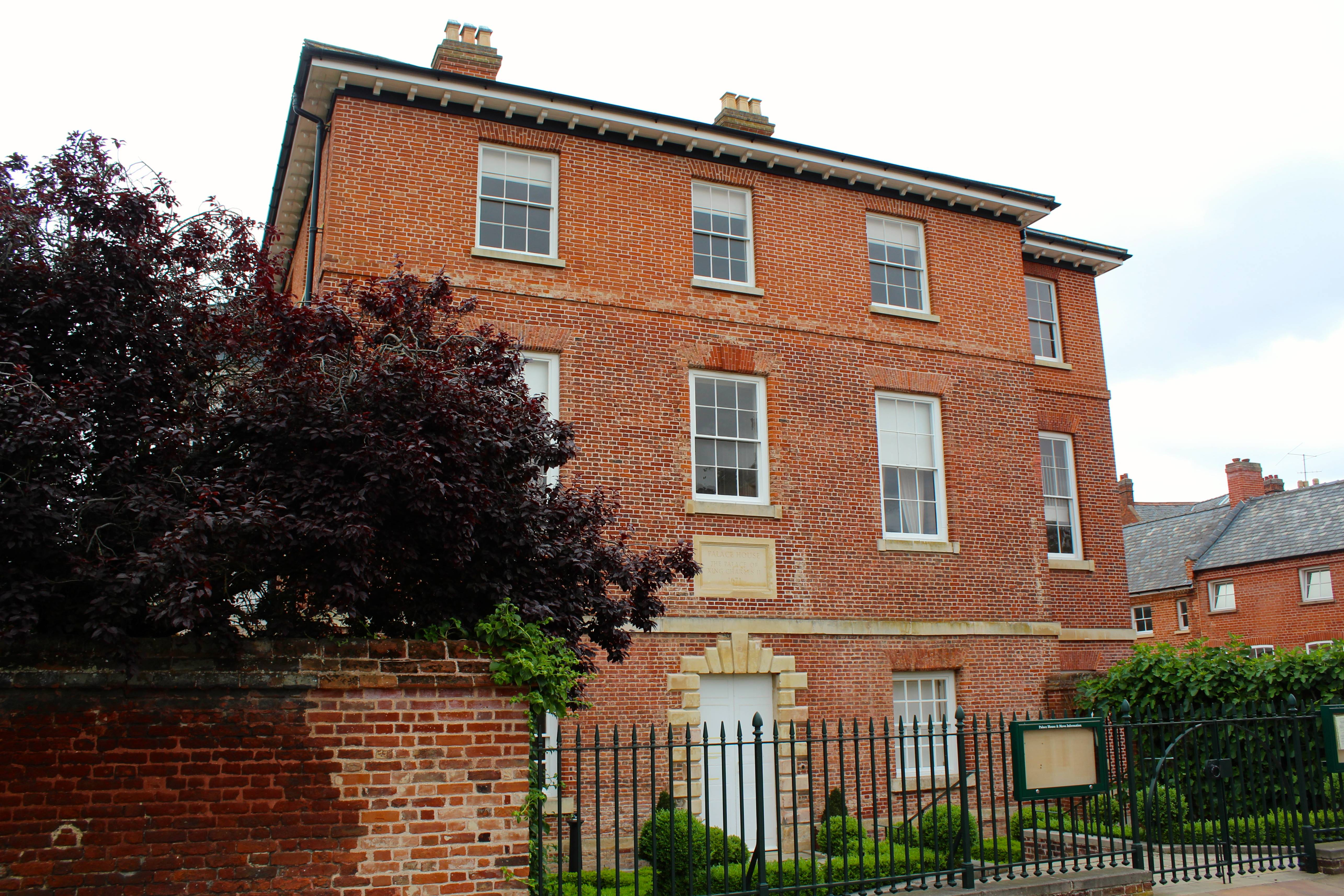
Palace House

Palace House, the only remaining part of the palace of Charles II, is home to the Fred Packard Museum and Galleries of British Sporting Art, as well as the offices of the British Sporting Art Trust. Equine artists represented in the collection include George Stubbs, Sir Alfred Munnings and Lucy Kemp-Welch. As well as paintings, the galleries display prints, sculpture, and everyday objects.

== Retraining of Racehorses ==
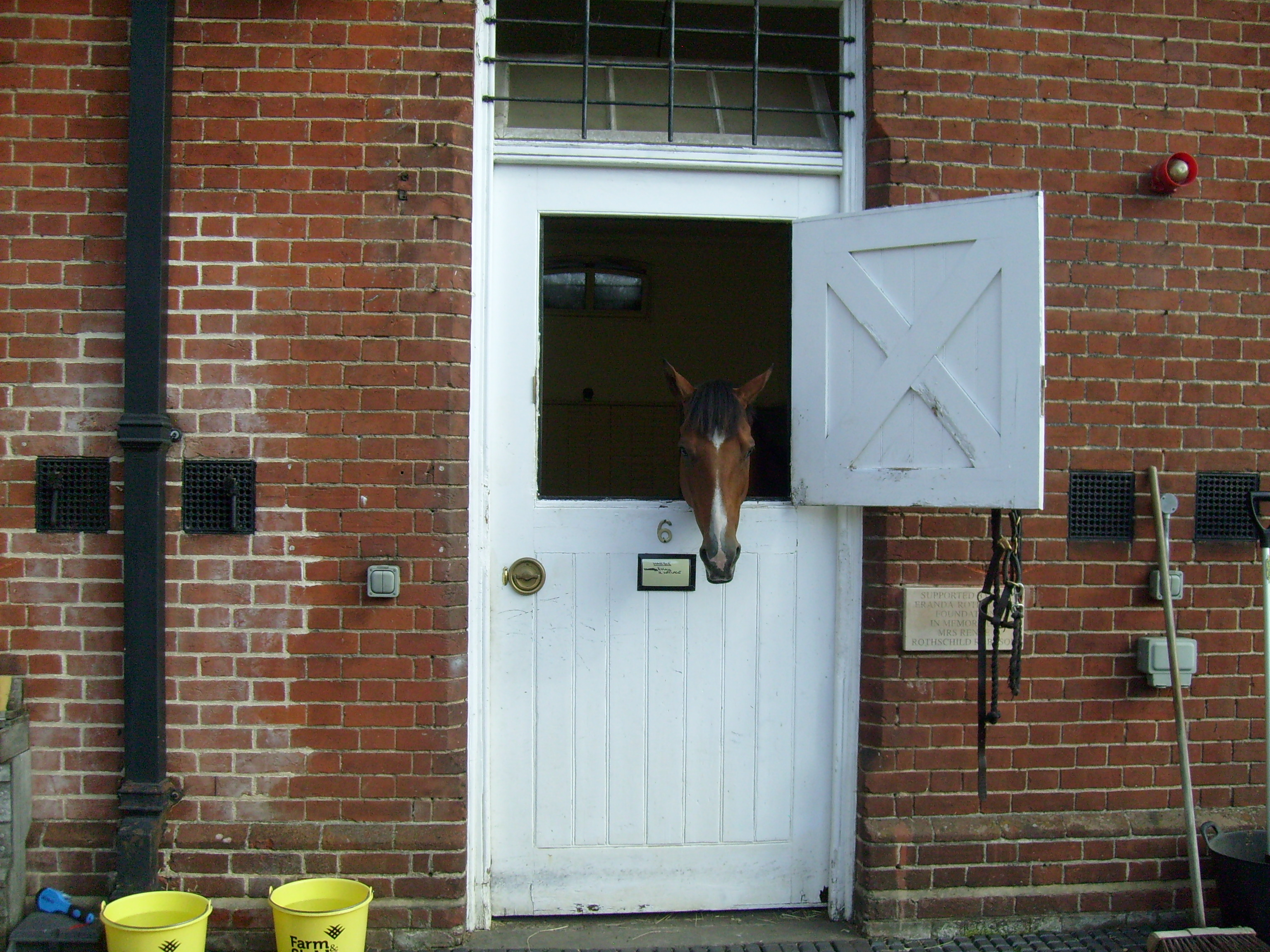
A retired racehorse in the Rothschild Yard

The Rothschild Yard in the grounds of the museum is home to Retraining of Racehorses and houses displays about the charity's work. Stabling and paddocks are provided for several retired racehorses. Visitors can meet the horses at specified times.

== Awards ==
In 2017 the museum was one of five finalists for the Art Fund Museum of the Year. In 2020 the museum won the small visitor attraction of the year category in the East Anglian Daily Times Norfolk and Suffolk Tourism Awards. In 2022 the museum was a highly commended runner-up in the large museum category at the Suffolk Museum of the Year Awards.

== See also ==
- Australian Racing Hall of Fame
- British Steeplechasing Hall of Fame
- Canadian Horse Racing Hall of Fame
- New Zealand Racing Hall of Fame
- United States National Museum of Racing and Hall of Fame
