= Newmarket Palace =

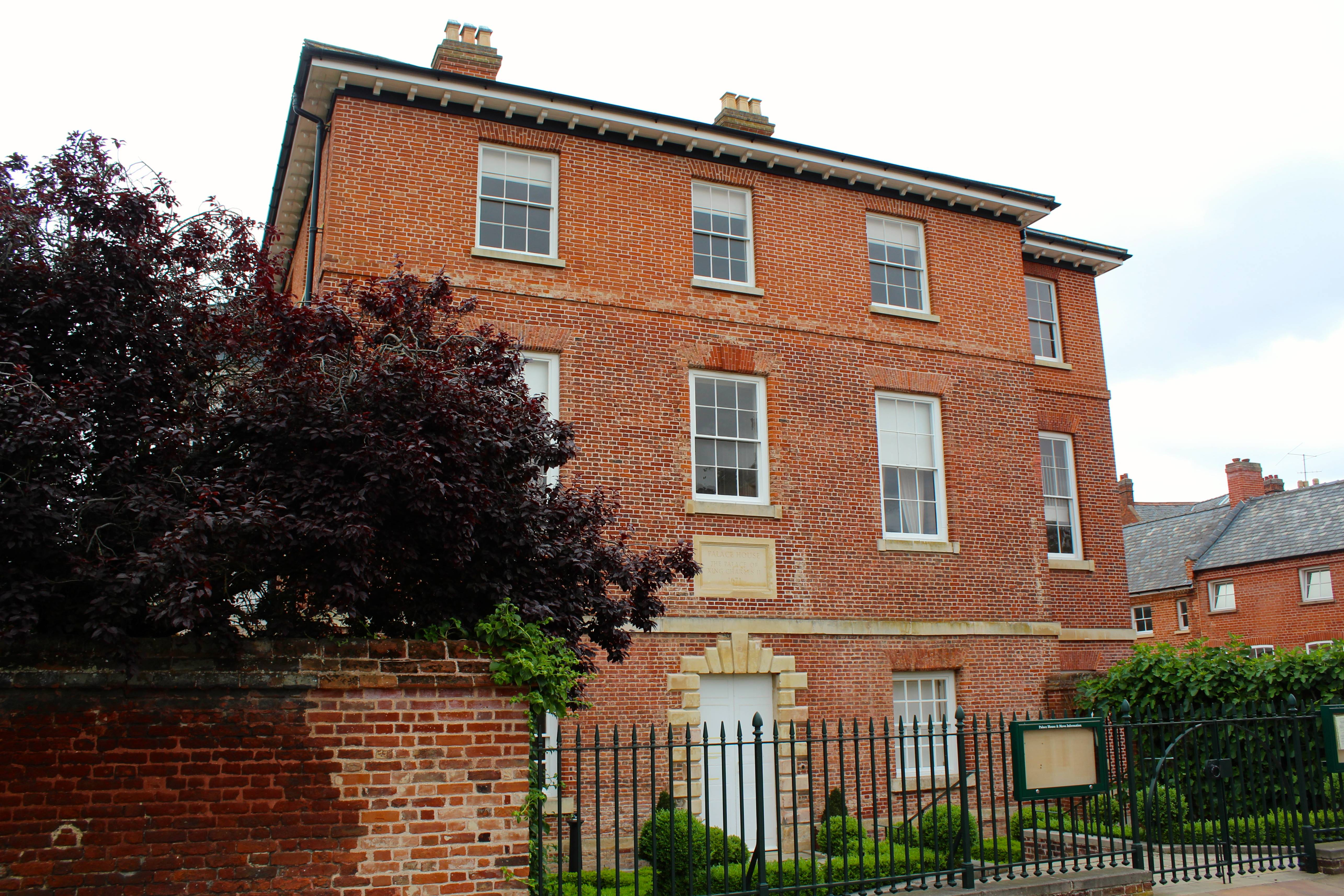
- Palace House, now part of the National Horseracing Museum

General information
- Type: Royal house
- Architectural style: Dutch classicism
- Location: Newmarket, Suffolk, England
- Current tenants: National Horseracing Museum
- Completed: 1668
- Demolished: 1819 (except Palace House)
- Client: Charles II
- Owner: Originally the Crown; later Rothschild family

Design and construction
- Architect: William Samwell

Newmarket Palace was a 17th-century royal residence in Newmarket, the remains of which are now part of the National Horseracing Museum.

James I first visited Newmarket in February 1605, when it was a market town with inns that catered for travellers making the journey from London to Norwich. The king saw Newmarket Heath as perfect for his favourite pastimes of hawking and hare coursing. He leased the Griffin inn on the high street and, in 1608, bought it for £400. Additions were made to the inn, but, in March 1613, they subsided while the king was in bed, and work was begun on a new building. The king's new lodgings, designed by his surveyor Simon Basil, were built of brick with a stone dressing under and were completed in October 1615, at a cost of £4,000. Stables, kennels, and a lodging block for the Prince of Wales, designed by Inigo Jones, were added. The buildings stretched from the high street to All Saints' Church, which served as a royal chapel when the king was in residence during the hare coursing season in the autumn and winter. The residence provided accommodation for the king's immediate household and allowed him to conduct state business, but without the ceremony seen at larger royal palaces.

Charles I continued his father's association with Newmarket. In June 1647, following his capture at Holdenby House in Northamptonshire, he was held under house arrest in his Newmarket residence for nearly a fortnight. During the Interregnum, the property was sold to a group of seven men, including John Okey, and was demolished.

Newmarket resumed its royal connections following the Restoration. In 1668, Charles II bought a plot of land on the high street, to the north-east of the demolished residence, and commissioned William Samwell to build a new palace. Samwell designed a brick building of two storeys with attics, consisting of linked pavilions in the French style. Royal palace historian Simon Thurley described it as "an elegant essay in Dutch classicism", which included the latest features of corner fireplaces and sash windows. Although Charles II was pleased with the house and spent much time there in the 1670s, others were unimpressed, with, for example, John Evelyn describing it as "meane enough, and hardly capable for a hunting house, let alone a royal palace!" Charles II added a training yard, Palace House stables, to the residence and was responsible for establishing Newmarket as a centre of horseracing.

The property was retained by the Crown until 1819, when it was sold off and most of it demolished to make way for shops and houses. The prince regent bought the king's pavilion and stables and allowed his trainer, William Edwards, to occupy them for life. In 1857, Queen Victoria sold the house and stables to Mayer Amschel de Rothschild. The king's pavilion underwent alterations by George Devey and was retained as a family home; the king's stables were later demolished and replaced by a new yard.

The Rothschild family sold the Palace House estate in 1985, and the new owners let it fall into disrepair. In 1992, Forest Heath District Council acquired the estate with a compulsory purchase order. Palace House was restored with support from the National Lottery Heritage Fund and English Heritage and was used as a civic building. Restoration work uncovered one of Samwell's sash windows that had previously been bricked-up and is the oldest surviving window of its type. Since 2016, Palace House estate has been home to the National Horseracing Museum. The king's pavilion houses a collection of sporting art and the office of the British Sporting Art Trust.
