= Mildenhall Rural District =

Former rural district in West Suffolk, England

Mildenhall
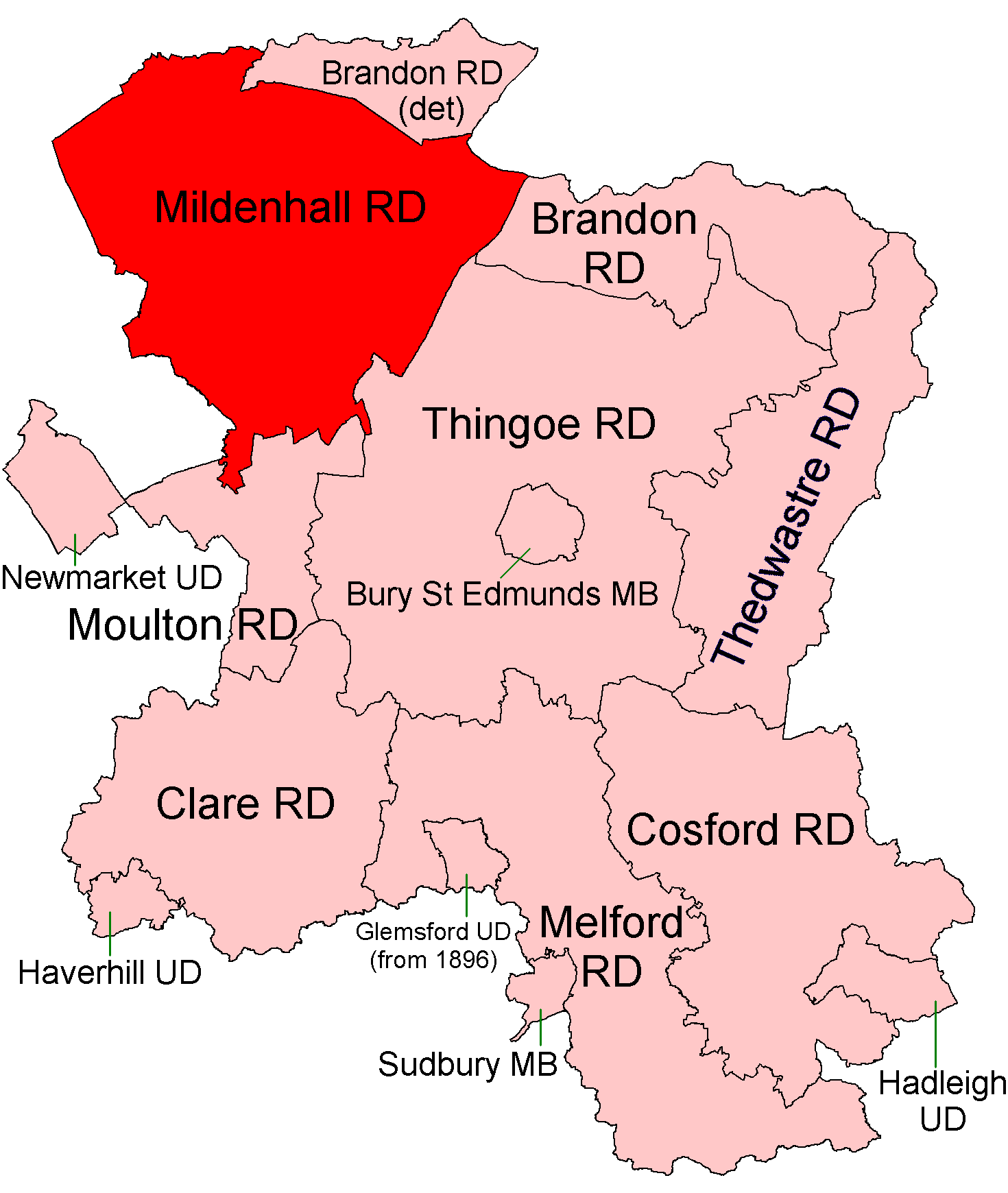
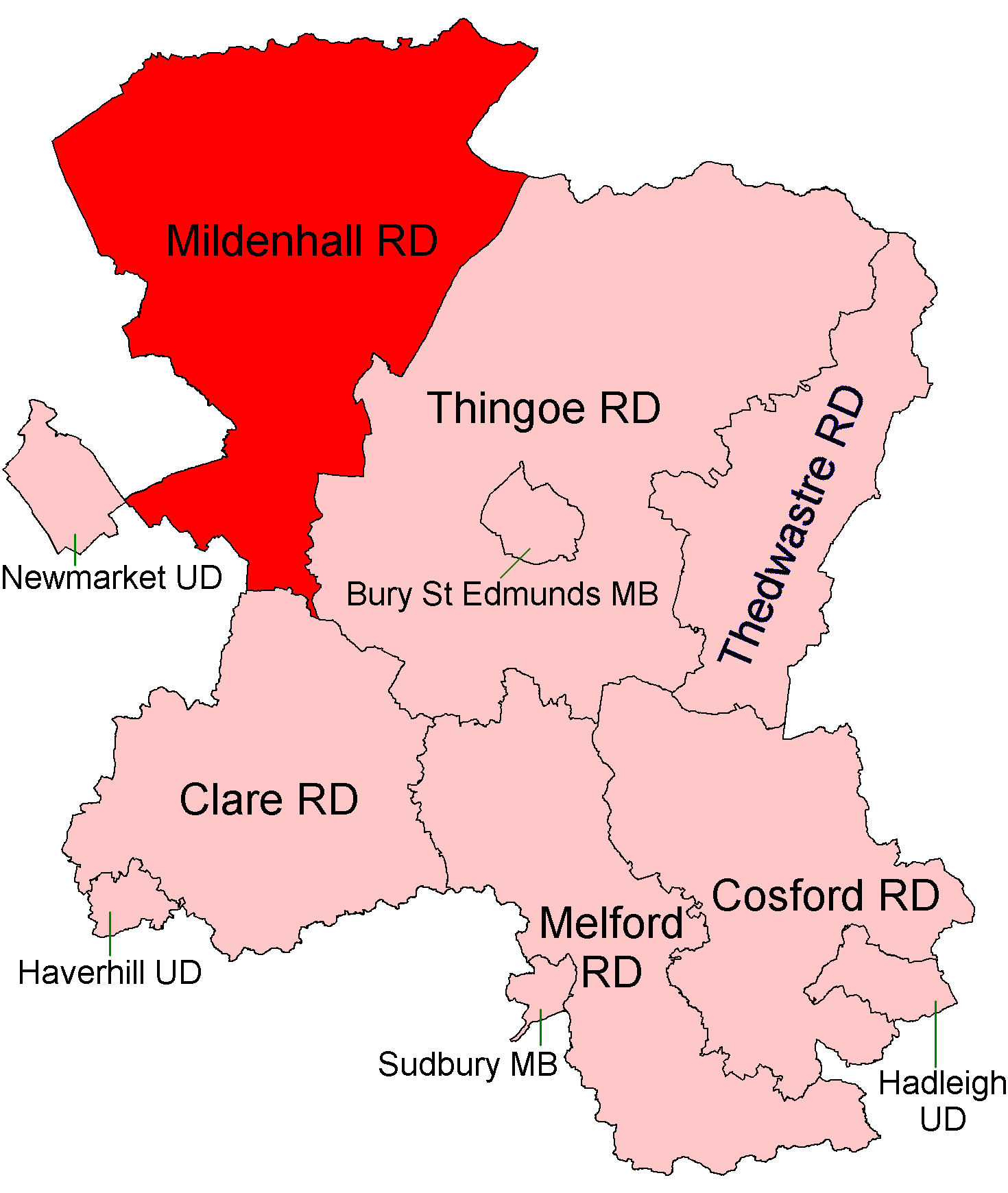
- Location within West Suffolk, 1894 Location within West Suffolk, 1935
- History
  - Created: 1894
  - Abolished: 1974
  - Succeeded by: Forest Heath
- Status: Rural district

Mildenhall Rural District was a rural district in the county of West Suffolk, England. It was created in 1894 out of the former Mildenhall rural sanitary district.

In 1935 it was expanded by taking in parts of the disbanded Brandon and Moulton RDs.

Since 1 April 1974 it has formed part of the local government district of Forest Heath and then from 1st April 2019 West Suffolk district.

== Parishes ==
Parish	From	Notes
Barton Mills		
Brandon	1935	From Brandon RD
Cavenham		
Dalham	1935	From Moulton RD
Elveden		
Eriswell		
Freckenham		
Gazeley	1935	From Moulton RD
Herringswell		
Higham Green	1935	From Moulton RD
Icklingham		
Kentford		
Lakenheath		
Mildenhall		
Moulton	1935	From Moulton RD
Santon Downham	1935	From Brandon RD
Tuddenham		
Wangford		
Worlington		

== Statistics ==
Year	Area		Population	Density (pop/ha)
Year	acres	ha	Population	Density (pop/ha)
1911	64,870	26,252	8,311	0.32
1921	64,870	26,252	7,990	0.30
1931	64,870	26,252	7,815	0.30
1951	86,759	35,110	18,564	0.53
1961	86,758	35,110	20,458	0.58
