= Ousden =

Village in Suffolk, England

Coordinates: 52.206°N 0.551°E

- Location within Suffolk
- Population: 266
- District: West Suffolk
- Shire county: Suffolk
- Region: East
- Country: England
- Sovereign state: United Kingdom
- Post town: Newmarket
- Postcode district: CB8
- Police: Suffolk
- Fire: Suffolk
- Ambulance: East of England
- UK Parliament: West Suffolk

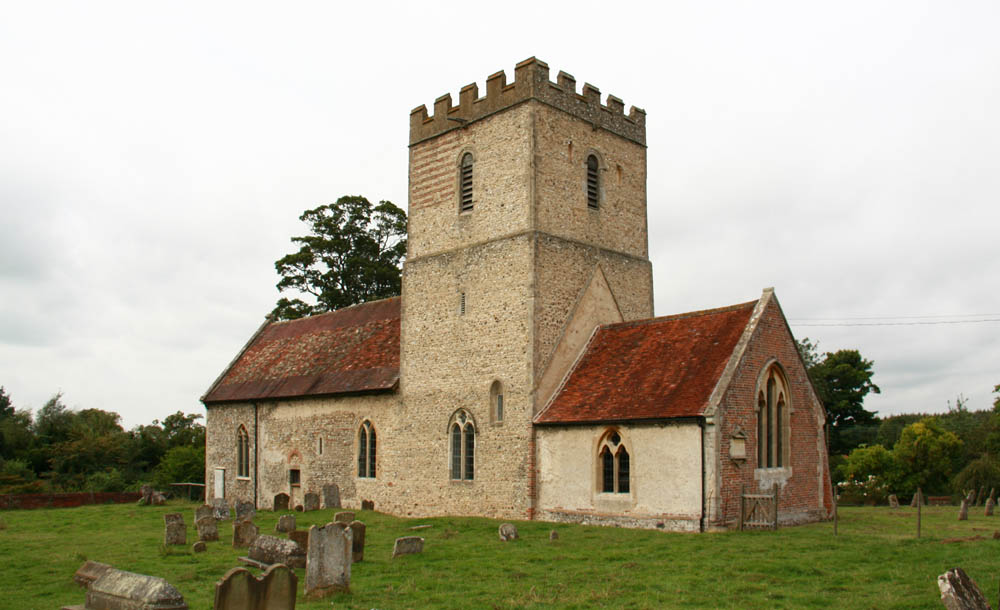
St Peter's Church, Ousden

Ousden is a village and civil parish in the West Suffolk district of Suffolk in eastern England. It is located around 6 miles (10 km) west of Bury St Edmunds and 72 miles (116 km) north of London, and as of 2011, its population is 266. The village has an Anglican church of St Peter's and a chapel in the cemetery dedicated to St Barnabas.

In the 1870s, Ousden was described as:

"A village and a parish in the district of Newmarket and county of Suffolk. The village stands 1½ mile E of the boundary with Cambridgeshire, 4¾ S by W of Higham r. station, and 6½ E S E of Newmarket."

== History ==
Ousden dates back to the Anglo-Saxon era. The name is derived from Old English and literally translates to 'owl valley'. In the Domesday Book Ousden is referred to as 'Uuesdana' and shows that in 1066 it consisted of 27 households, considered to be a 'quite large' village, and part of the Hundred of Risbridge. There was a population of fifteen villagers, nine smallholders and two slaves. There were six acres of land and four cobs, 15 cattle, 22 pigs and 158 sheep. The Lord of Ousden in 1066 was Leofric, but by 1086 the Lord and tenant-in-chief was Eustace, Count of Boulogne.

The parish church, St Peter's, also dates from around this time. It is a place of interest because it is a Norman tripartite, with the nave, central tower and chancel remaining intact. Throughout the 20th century, the building was added to according to architectural trends of the time and the needs of the parish. For example, in the 18th century a new chancel was erected along with a new brick chapel. In 1912, a burial ground was created for the Ousden residents extending for a mile next to the church. Within this a red brick chapel was built as a daughter church and is dedicated to St Barnabas.

The village also had a manor, lived in by the Moseley family from 1567 until it was sold in 1800 and bought in 1804 by the Rev. James Thomas Hand. The manor passed onto his nephew Thomas James Ireland in 1835, when it was called Owsden Hall. The mansion was constructed of red brick "in the Grecian syle" with a slate roof, surrounded by "pleasure gardens" with lawn and shruberries and a lake adjoining to a park of some fifty acres. Ireland refurbished the mansion, leaving the original wings constructed by the Moseley family in 1750. The Ireland family continued to live in the house until 1885, when it was acquired by the Mackworth-Praed family. The family remained in the Manor until 1955 when it was demolished.

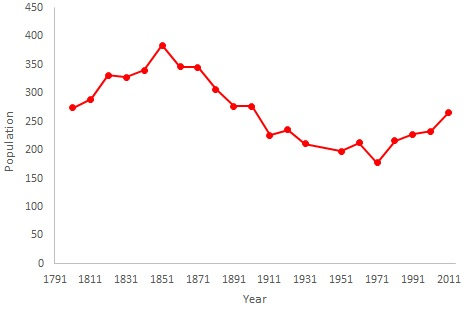
The total population of Ousden as recorded by the Census of Population from 1801 to 2011.

In 1851, Ousden was part of the Diocese of Ely, a large diocese covering West Suffolk, Cambridgeshire and Bedfordshire. Today, Ousden is part of the Diocese of St Edmundsbury and Ipswich, a smaller diocese covering much of West Suffolk.

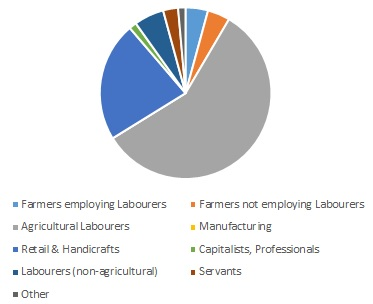
Occupational Structure of Ousden in 1831

Ousden's first census was in 1801 where the population was recorded as 274. A population time-series graph shows that Ousden's population peaked in 1851 and has since been declining. The parish itself has not changed in area, but it has changed districts in which the census would have taken place. In 1888, it was a part of the Newmarket Union, but by 1922 it was part of the Moulton District, and then changed again in 1831 to the Clare District. These changes in district may account for slight dips in the population due to more rural houses affecting the population count as districts change.

The occupational history of Ousden lies in the agricultural industry. In 1831, 58% of the male population were agricultural labourers, and the percentage of males working in agriculture was 66%. By the end of the 19th century the percentage of men working in agriculture was still 64%. Most of the female population in the village had no occupation; the majority of those that did were in domestic services or offices.

Since the 1970s Ousden has been informally twinned with Notus, Idaho.
