= Newmarket, Suffolk =

Market town in Suffolk, England

Coordinates: 52.2459°N 0.4105°E

Newmarket
- Town
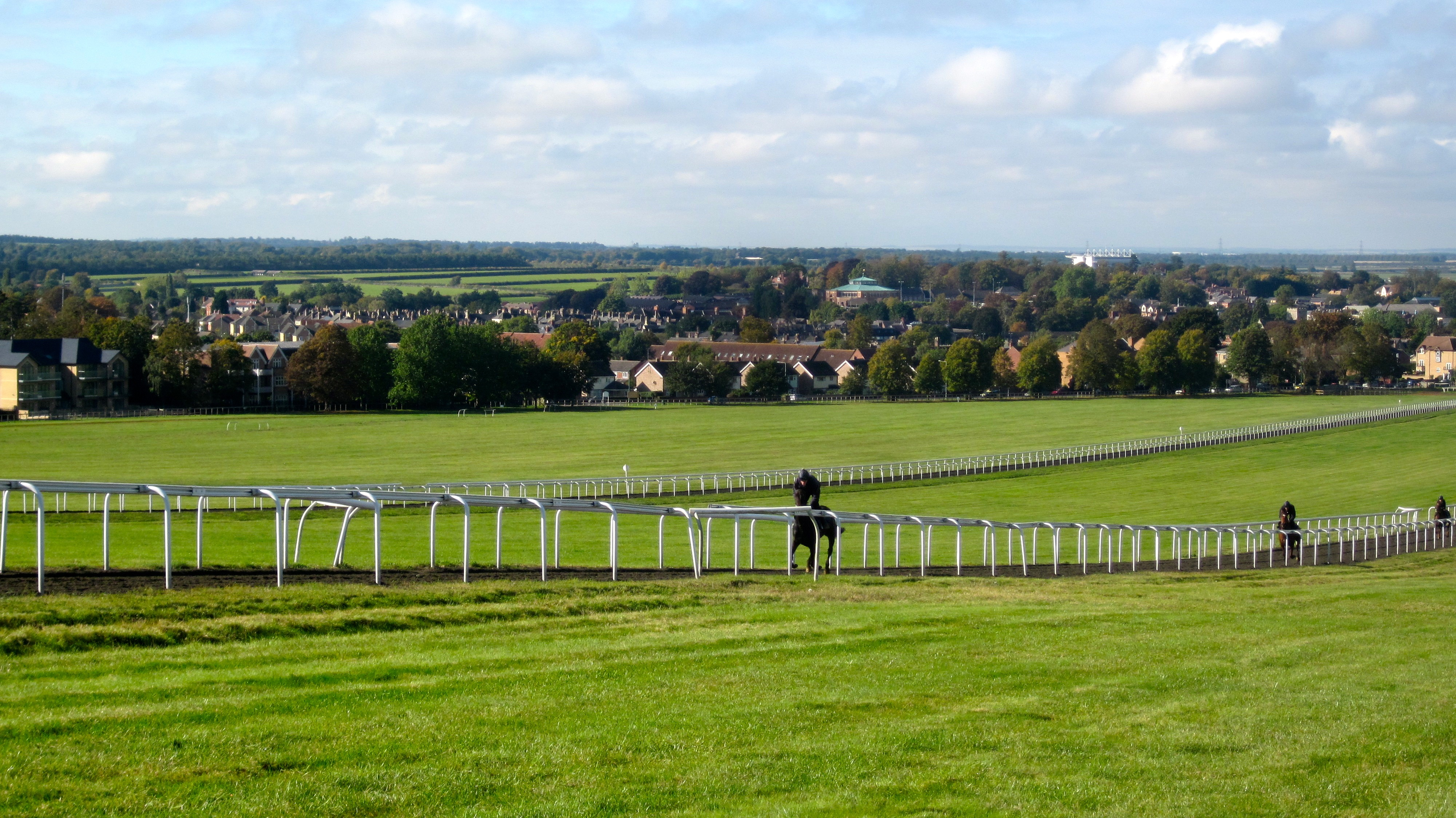
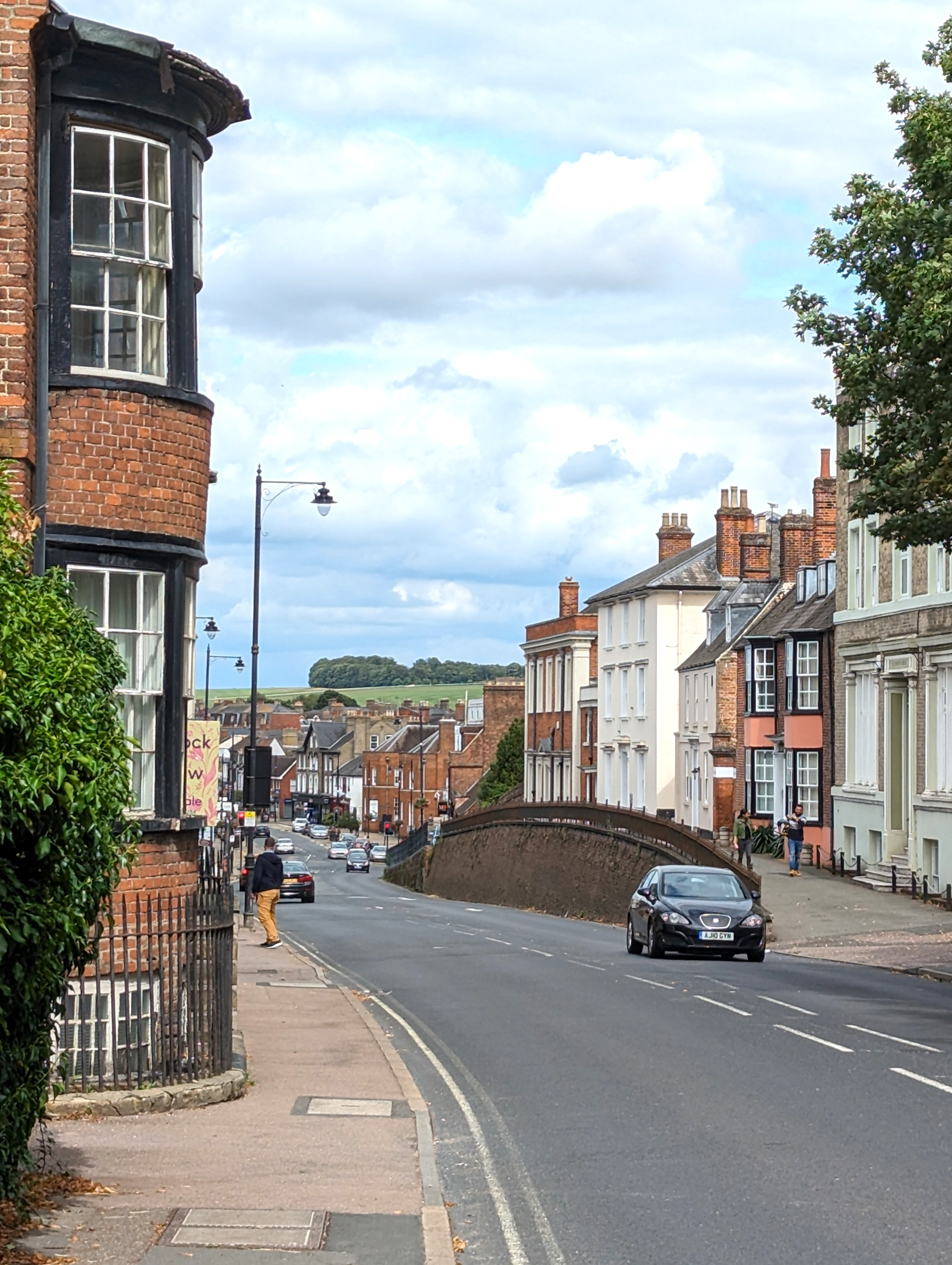
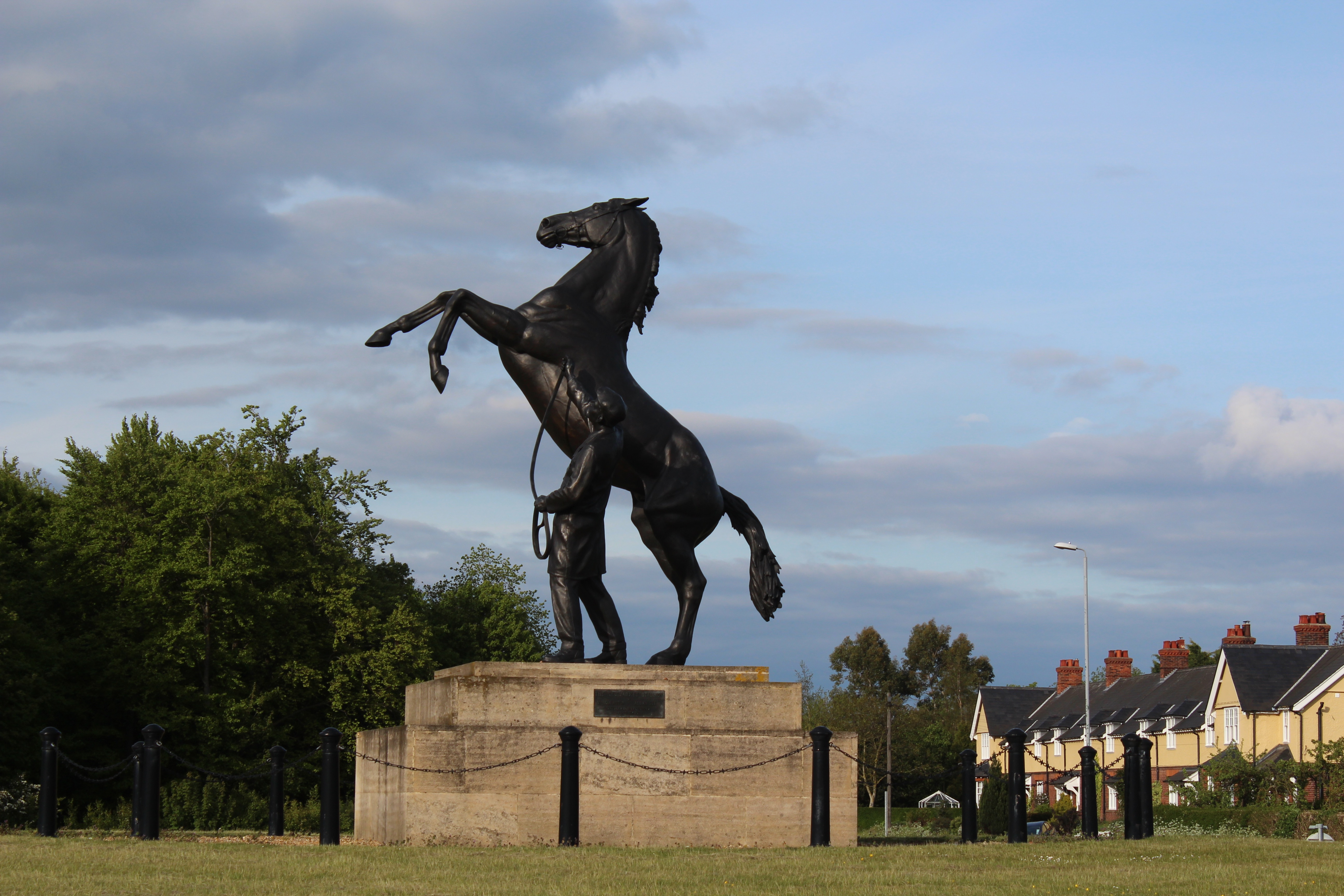
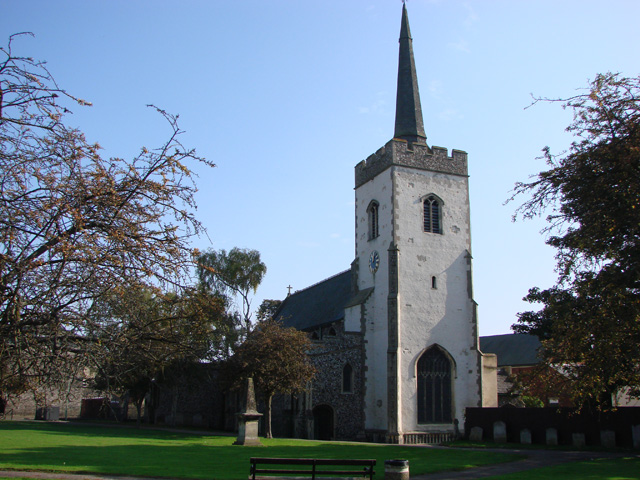
- Clockwise from top: Newmarket from Long Hill Gallop; Statue outside the National Stud; St Mary's Church; and the High Street

- Location within Suffolk
- Area: 14.65 km^{2} (5.66 sq mi)
- Population: 16,772 (2021 Census)
  - Density: 1,145/km^{2} (2,970/sq mi)
- OS grid reference: TL645636
- Civil parish: Newmarket
- District: West Suffolk,
- Shire county: Suffolk
- Region: East
- Country: England
- Sovereign state: United Kingdom
- Post town: NEWMARKET
- Postcode district: CB8
- Dialling code: 01638
- Police: Suffolk
- Fire: Suffolk
- Ambulance: East of England
- UK Parliament: West Suffolk

Newmarket is a market town and civil parish in the West Suffolk district of Suffolk, England. It lies 14 miles (22.5 km) west of Bury St Edmunds and the same distance north-east of Cambridge. The population in 2021 was 16,772.

The town is known as a centre for the breeding, training and racing of thoroughbred horses; it is home to two racecourses, about 70 training yards, some 3,000 horses, over 60 stud farms, two equine hospitals, the British Racing School, Tattersalls auction sales, the Jockey Club Rooms, the National Horseracing Museum and racing charities. The Rowley Mile racecourse hosts two British Classic Races. Between them, the two racecourses hold races on 39 days every year, more than any other town in Britain.

Newmarket originated in the early 13th century, when the lord of the manor of Exning was granted a charter to hold a weekly market. During the Tudor period, it served the needs of travellers on the London to Norwich road with a number of inns and alehouses. The town has enjoyed royal patronage since the 17th century, when James I, Charles I and Charles II made Newmarket Palace their base for sporting activities. Until the late 19th century, Newmarket was divided down the middle of the High Street into two parishes: St Mary's in Suffolk to the north and All Saints in Cambridgeshire to the south. From 1889 to 1974, the town was part of the county of West Suffolk and, since 1974, has been part of the West Suffolk district.

== History ==
=== Town ===
Newmarket lies on the ancient Icknield Way, and Bronze Age barrows have provided evidence of early settlement in the area. Devil's Dyke, an earthwork that crosses Newmarket Heath between the two racecourses, was built by Anglo-Saxons in the seventh century. The town acquired its name in the early 13th century, when Richard de Argentein, who had married the daughter of the lord of the manor of Exning, was granted a charter by King Henry to hold a weekly market. A charter for an annual fair was then granted in 1223.

During the Tudor period, Newmarket's economy depended largely on its market and on a number of inns serving the needs of travellers on the London to Norwich road. The High Street divided the town between two parishes: Exning in Suffolk to the north and Woodditton in Cambridgeshire to the south. St Mary's separated from Exning to become a parish in its own right in the 16th century, while All Saints separated from Woodditton in the 18th century.

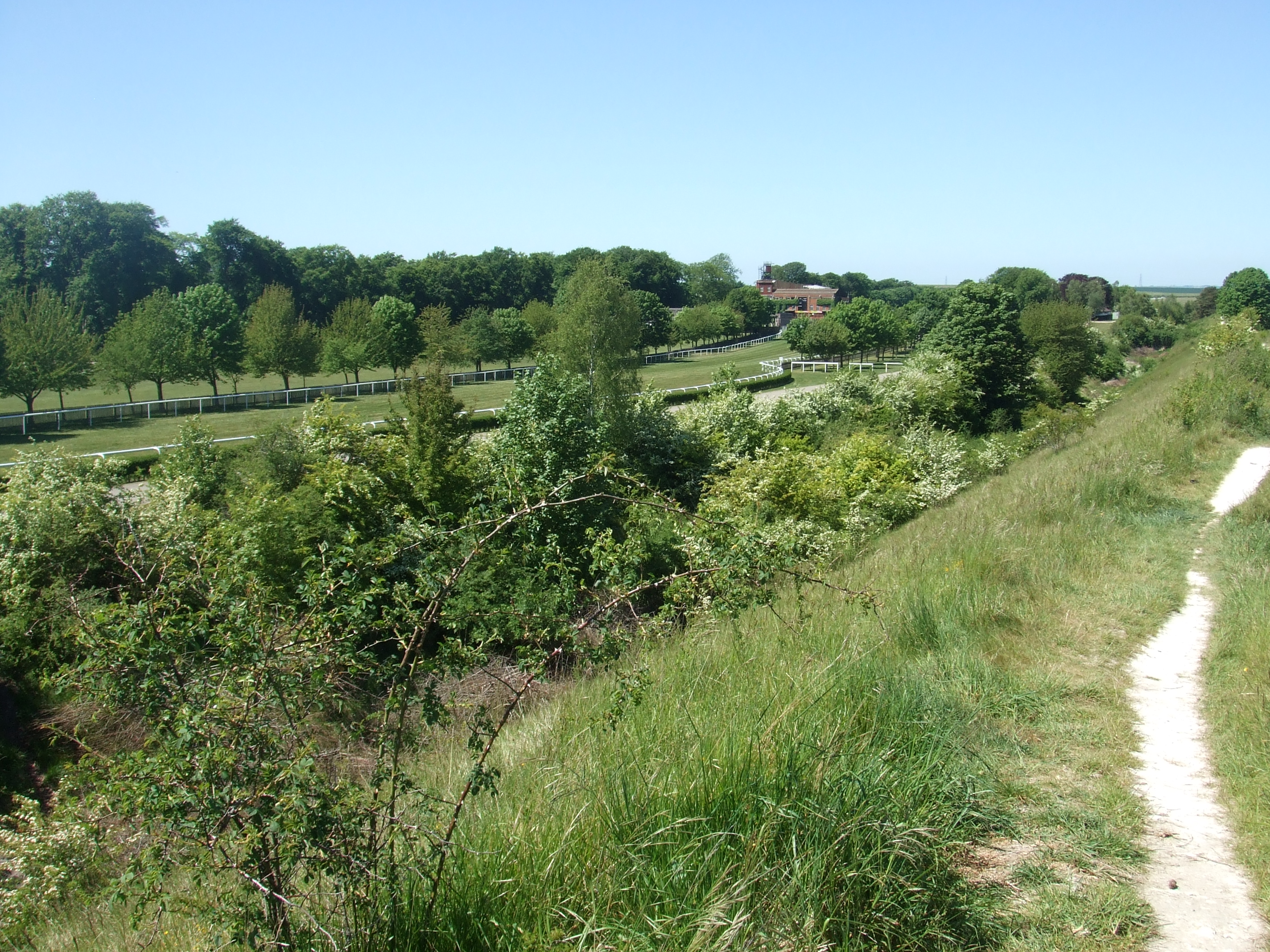
Devil's Dyke

Newmarket's royal connection began when James I visited the town in February 1605 and saw the potential of Newmarket Heath for hare coursing and hawking. At first, he leased the Griffin inn; then, in 1608, he bought the property and built Newmarket Palace on the site, which extended from the High Street west of Sun Lane to All Saints Church. The court spent about a month in the spring, and sometimes a month in the autumn, in Newmarket. The first palace building suffered from subsidence and sank on one side when King James was in residence in 1613. Simon Basil, and later, Inigo Jones, were commissioned to build new lodgings for the King and the Prince of Wales. Jones's design for the prince's lodging had three storeys and was Italianate in style.

Although there had been occasional races on Newmarket Heath during the reign of James I, it was his son, Charles I, who established the sport in the town, building a stand on the Heath to watch races. Charles' last visit to Newmarket before the civil war was in 1642. He returned to the town as a prisoner in June 1647, having been captured at Holdenby House in Northamptonshire. He was placed under house arrest for about ten days in the palace, although he was allowed to ride on the heath. In 1650, the palace was sold to a group of seven men, including John Okey, and was demolished.

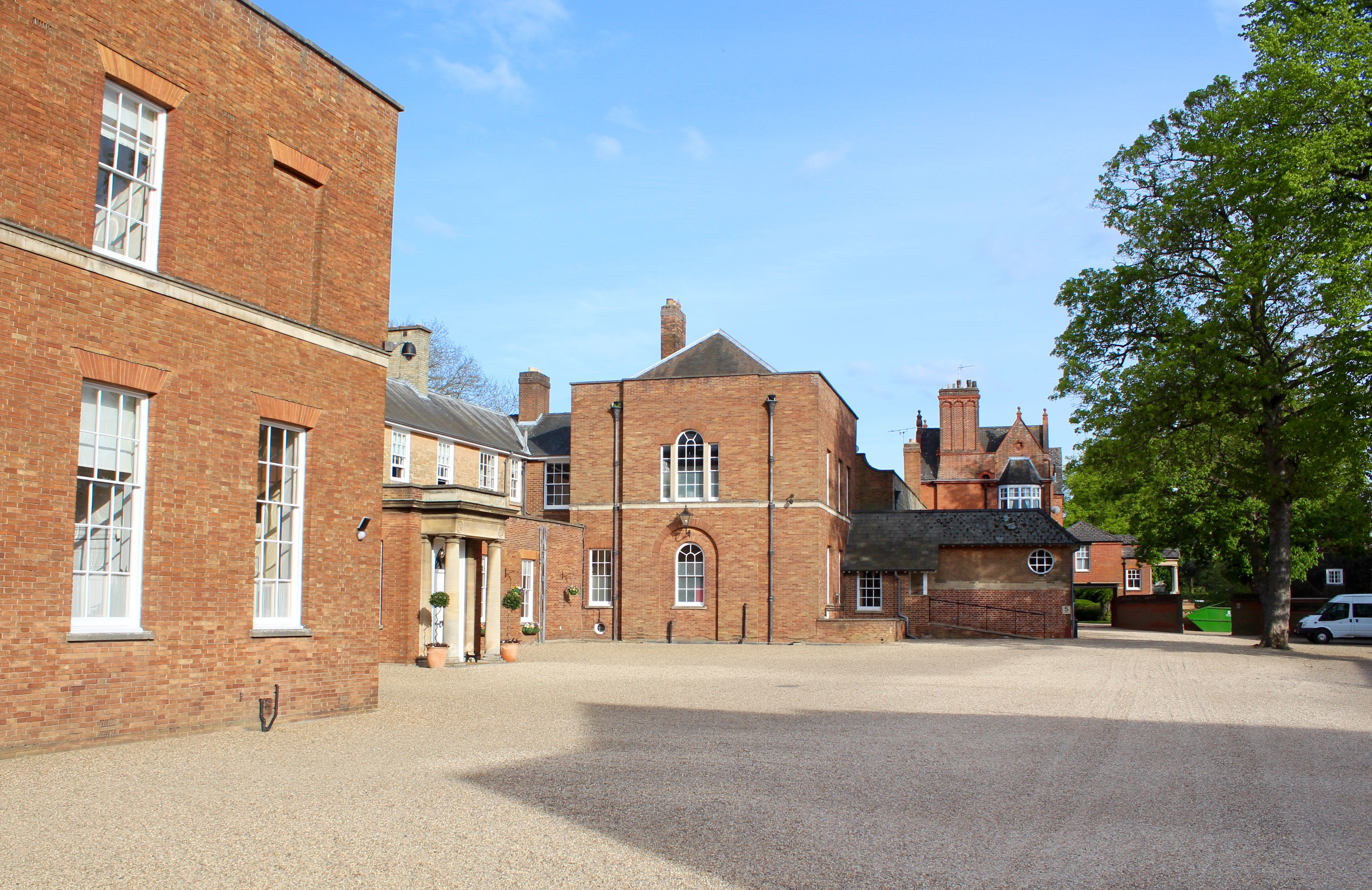
The Jockey Club Rooms

Following the Restoration, Charles II re-established the royal connection with Newmarket. In 1668, he commissioned William Samwell to build a new palace on the High Street. It was described by John Evelyn as "meane enough, and hardly capable for a hunting house, let alone a royal palace!" Charles II also built a training yard and the town became a centre for racing, with the Spring and Autumn meetings taking place during the king's visits. In 1683, a fire swept through the town on the north side of the High Street, killing three people and destroying houses, shops, barns and stables. The damage was estimated at £20,265 4s 8d. William III and Queen Anne both spent time in Newmarket; Queen Anne founded a boys' school and a girls' school in the town. The first three Hanoverian kings had little interest in racing and did not visit Newmarket. George IV, whilst he was Prince of Wales, owned racehorses and frequented the town until 1791, when a scandal involving his horse Escape and his jockey Samuel Chifney led to a falling out with the Jockey Club, which had established its headquarters in Newmarket in 1752.

The prince never returned to Newmarket, although he continued to keep his horses in training there. The palace was sold in the early 19th century and much of it was demolished. The development of painting on sporting themes in the early eighteenth century was centred on the Newmarket Rracecourse and the three founders of the sporting school, John Wootton, James Seymour and Peter Tillemans, painted many scenes of the racecourse and its environs.

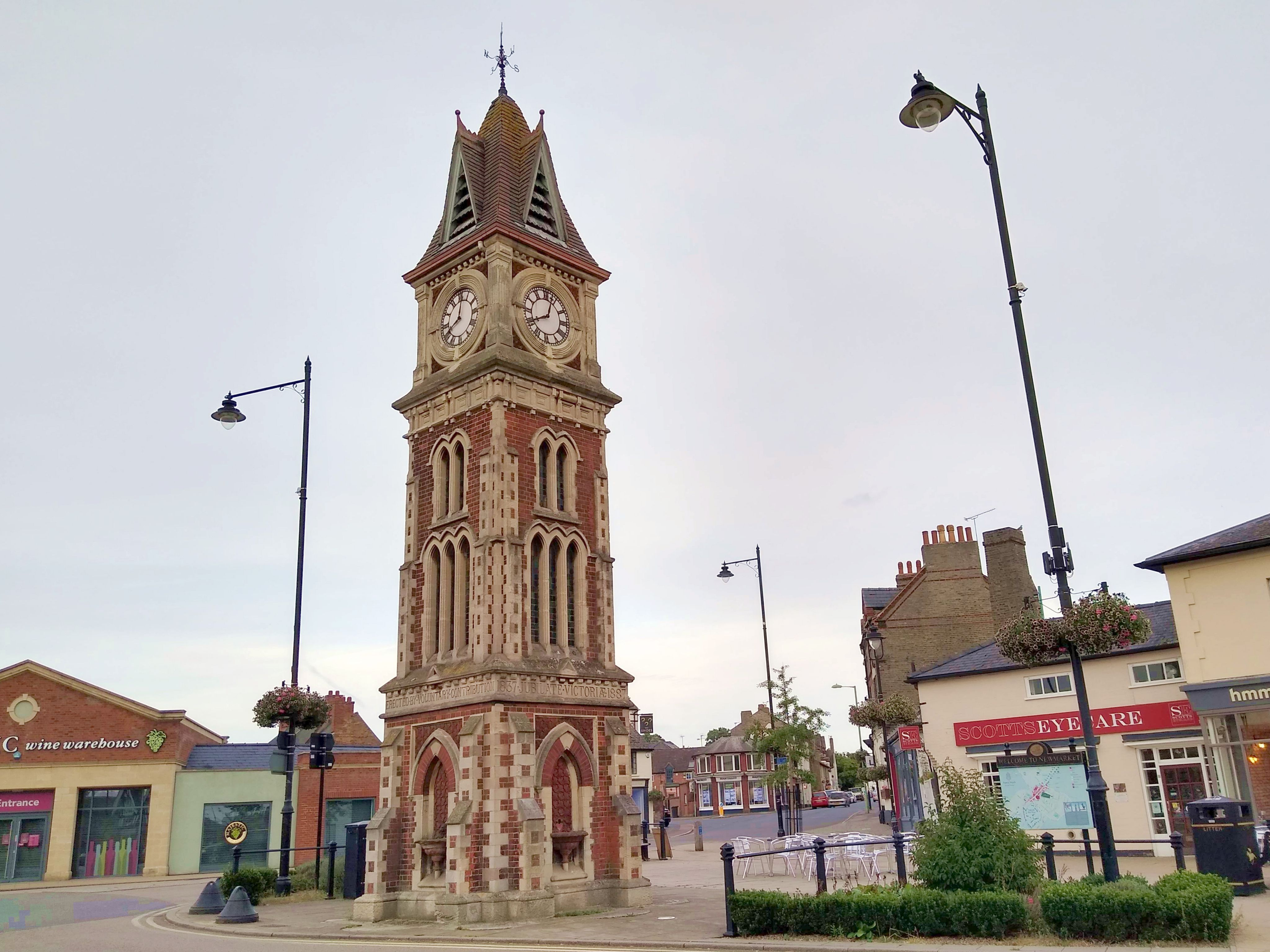
The Clock Tower

In 1887, a clock tower was erected at the north-east end of the High Street to celebrate the Golden Jubilee of Queen Victoria.

During World War I, tented army camps were set up on the Heath. A memorial, erected on land donated by the Jockey Club, was dedicated in October 2021. In World War II, the Rowley Mile racecourse became an RAF base. Racing continued at a few courses during both world wars; the Derby was run at Newmarket between 1915–18 and 1940–45. On the afternoon of 18 February 1941, ten bombs were dropped on the High Street, killing 27 people.

In the early 1970s, the old Rookery area of narrow streets and small shops and houses to the north of the High Street was demolished to make way for a new market place and shopping centre. The Newmarket bypass was opened in 1975.

=== Railway ===
The town's first railway was a line built by the Newmarket and Chesterford Railway and opened in 1848, by then renamed the Newmarket Railway. It branched off the West Anglia Main Line at Great Chesterford and ran about 15 miles (24 km) north-eastwards. There was a terminus in Newmarket, with intermediate stations at Bourne Bridge, Balsham Road and Six Mile Bottom.

With the development of other railway lines, the Newmarket terminus was replaced by the present through-station in 1902. The old terminus was used as a goods station until 1967 and demolished in 1980. The 1,100 yards (1,000 m) Warren Hill tunnel was built in 1852–1854 to take the railway under the gallops. Warren Hill station was built north of the tunnel for raceday use. It opened in 1895 and closed in 1945.

== Governance ==
The area of Suffolk containing Newmarket is almost an administrative island, with only a narrow strip of land linking it to the rest of the county. There are three tiers of local government covering Newmarket, at parish (town), district and county level: Newmarket Town Council, West Suffolk District Council and Suffolk County Council.

The town lies in the parliamentary constituency of West Suffolk, which has been represented by Nick Timothy since 2024.

=== Administrative history ===
Newmarket
- Local Board District (1851–1894); Urban District (1894–1974)
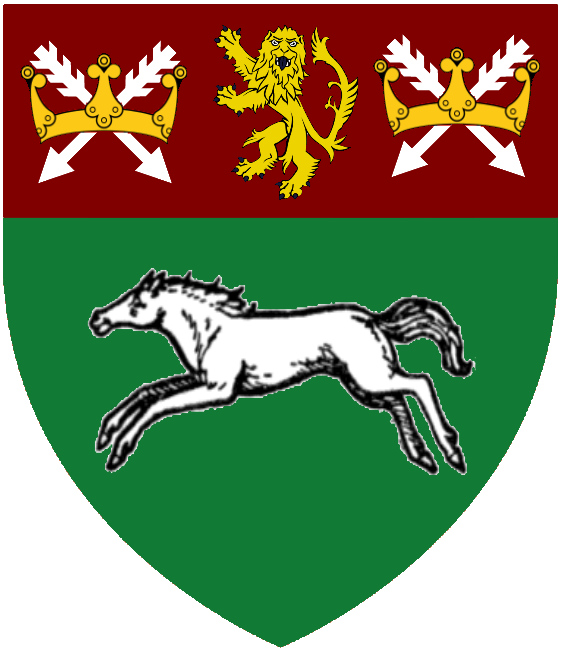
Newmarket Escutcheon
Coat of arms
- Population
  - 1891: 6,213
  - 1971: 12,360
- History
  - Created: 7 August 1851 (Local Board); 31 December 1894 (Urban District)
  - Abolished: 31 March 1974
  - Succeeded by: Forest Heath
  - HQ: Newmarket
- Contained within
  - Quarter Sessions (until 1889) County Council (after 1889): Suffolk and Cambridgeshire (until 1889); West Suffolk (after 1889)

Historically, the town was split between parishes and counties, with one parish – St Mary – in Suffolk, and the other – All Saints – in Cambridgeshire. The boundary between the two parishes followed the High Street through the middle of the town, with St Mary's parish and Suffolk to the north, and All Saints' parish and Cambridgeshire to the south. In 1851, a local board of health was established to govern the town, with its territory covering the two Newmarket parishes and parts of the neighbouring parishes of Exning (Suffolk) and Woodditton (Cambridgeshire).

The Local Government Act 1888 established county councils, and directed that urban sanitary districts such as Newmarket Local Board should not straddle county boundaries. As such, the whole local board district was brought within West Suffolk on 1 April 1889. The Local Government Act 1894 established elected parish and district councils, with Newmarket Local Board becoming Newmarket Urban District Council on 31 December 1894. Newmarket Urban District Council held its first meeting on 31 December 1894 at Newmarket Town Hall at 29 High Street, a converted theatre which had previously been used by the old local board for meetings. The first chairman of the urban district council was Joseph Rogers, who had been the last chairman of the local board.

On 1 October 1895, the urban district was enlarged by absorbing the rest of Exning parish and additional areas from Woodditton parish (the latter being added to the civil parish of Newmarket All Saints). Thereafter, Newmarket Urban District covered three civil parishes: Newmarket St Mary, Newmarket All Saints and Exning. These were urban parishes and so did not have parish councils of their own, but were directly administered by Newmarket Urban District Council.

The urban district council was based at the Town Hall at 29 High Street until 1922, when it moved to Godolphin House at 2 The Avenue; it sold the Town Hall to be converted into commercial premises. By 1937 the council had moved its main offices to Stratford House at 29 Old Station Road, but continued to use Godolphin House for some departments. Around 1948 the council acquired Severals House at 3 Bury Road, which then served as its offices and meeting place until the council's abolition in 1974. Newmarket Urban District Council was granted a coat of arms on 15 November 1951.

The Local Government Commission for England suggested in the 1960s that the border around Newmarket could be altered in West Suffolk's favour. Conversely, the 1972 Local Government Bill, as originally proposed, would have transferred the town (and Haverhill) to Cambridgeshire. Newmarket Urban District Council supported the move to Cambridgeshire, but ultimately the government decided to withdraw this proposal and keep the existing boundary, despite lobbying from the Urban District Council.

Newmarket Urban District was abolished under the Local Government Act 1972, merging with neighbouring Mildenhall Rural District to become Forest Heath District on 1 April 1974. No successor parish was created for the former urban district, and so it became an unparished area, remaining unparished until 1999 when the area was split between two parishes called Newmarket and Exning, with the parish council for Newmarket adopting the name Newmarket Town Council. Forest Heath District Council had its main offices at Mildenhall. Forest Heath merged with neighbouring St Edmundsbury in 2019 to become West Suffolk, administered from Bury St Edmunds.

== Horse racing ==
A statue of Elizabeth II, outside the Rowley Mile Racecourse

Known as the headquarters of British flat racing, Newmarket is home to two racecourses, numerous training yards and stud farms. In 2021/22, over 3,000 jobs in the town were connected to the horse racing industry.

=== Training ===
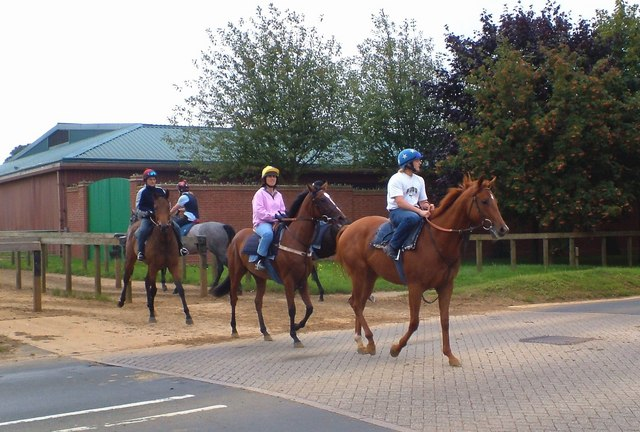
A dedicated horse crossing

As of 2022, there were about 70 trainers based in Newmarket, responsible for over 3,000 horses. In 2022, Newmarket trainers won over half of all British Group 1 races, including all five Classics.

The horses are trained on Newmarket Heath training grounds, which are owned and managed by the Jockey Club. (Note: Godolphin owns private gallops for the use of their trainers.) To the west of the town are the Racecourse Side grounds, while the Bury Side grounds to the east include Warren Hill, Long Hill and the Limekilns. There are facilities for training National Hunt horses over jumps on The Links, to south of the racecourses. Covering a total of 2,500 acres (1,000 ha), the grounds include 50 miles (80 km) of turf gallops and 14 miles (23 km) of artificial gallops.

Horses reach the training grounds via a series of horsewalks through the town, with dedicated crossing points on roads. Owners pay a heath tax for their horses to use the gallops. The public are allowed on the training grounds after 1 pm, when all the horses have finished training.

=== Racecourses ===
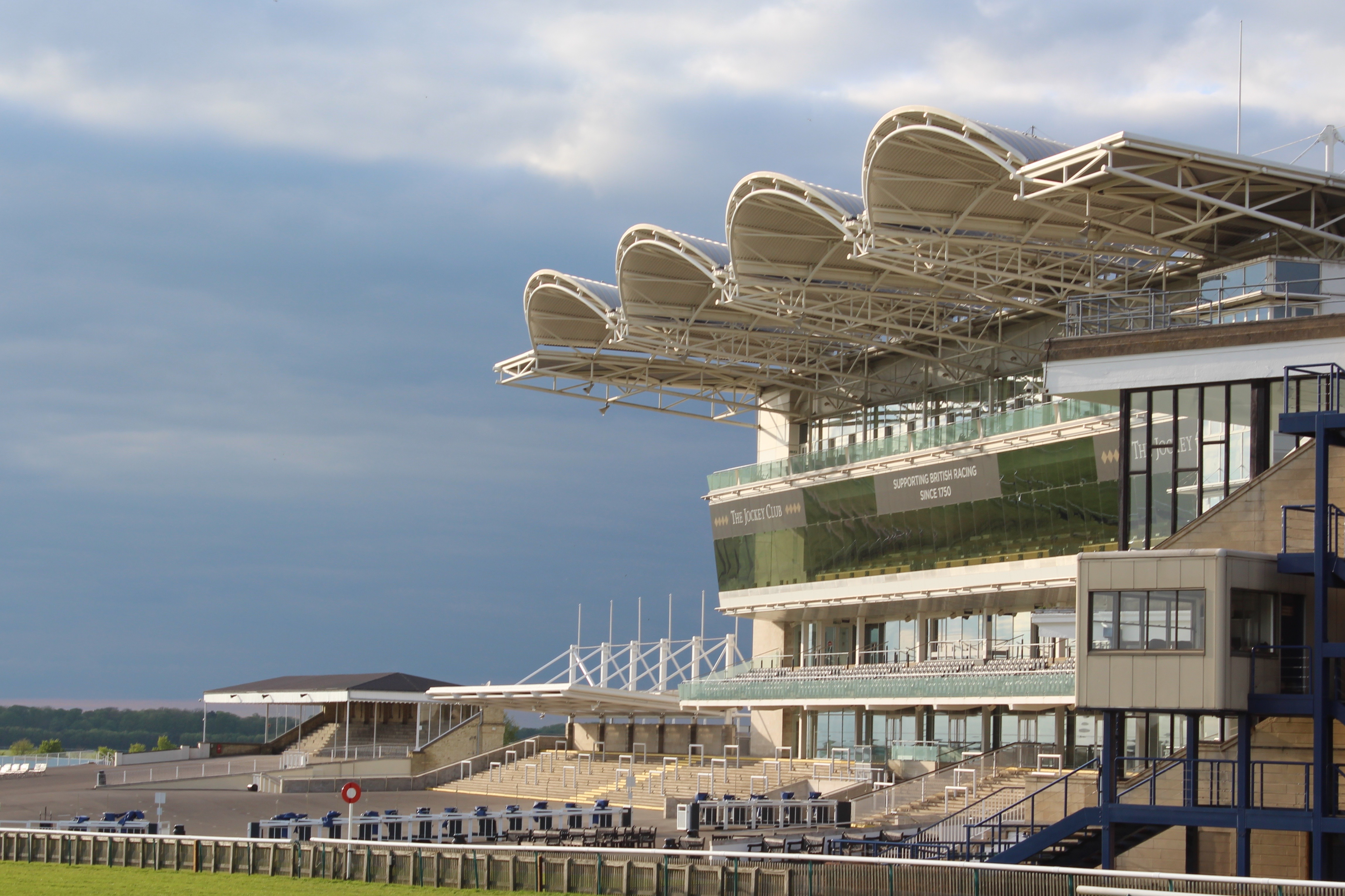
The Rowley Mile Racecourse

The July Racecourse

Newmarket has two racecourses: The Rowley Mile and The July Course. Separated by Devil's Dyke, the courses are situated on the heath to the west of the town, on the north side of the Cambridge Road. The Rowley Mile, named after a horse belonging to Charles II, holds spring and autumn meetings; it is the home of Newmarket's two Classic races, the 2,000 Guineas and the 1,000 Guineas, run in the first weekend of May every year. Future Champions Day, run in the autumn on the weekend before Champions Day at Ascot, includes the Dewhurst Stakes. The July Course holds meetings and music nights in the summer and is the home of the July Cup, the Falmouth Stakes. Between them, the courses hold racing on 39 days every year, a record for any town in Britain. One quarter of Britain's Group 1 races are held at Newmarket. The Rowley mile holds the Cambridgeshire and Cesarewitch handicaps, two of the oldest handicap races in Britain. The courses each have a capacity of about 20,000 spectators.

=== Stud farms ===
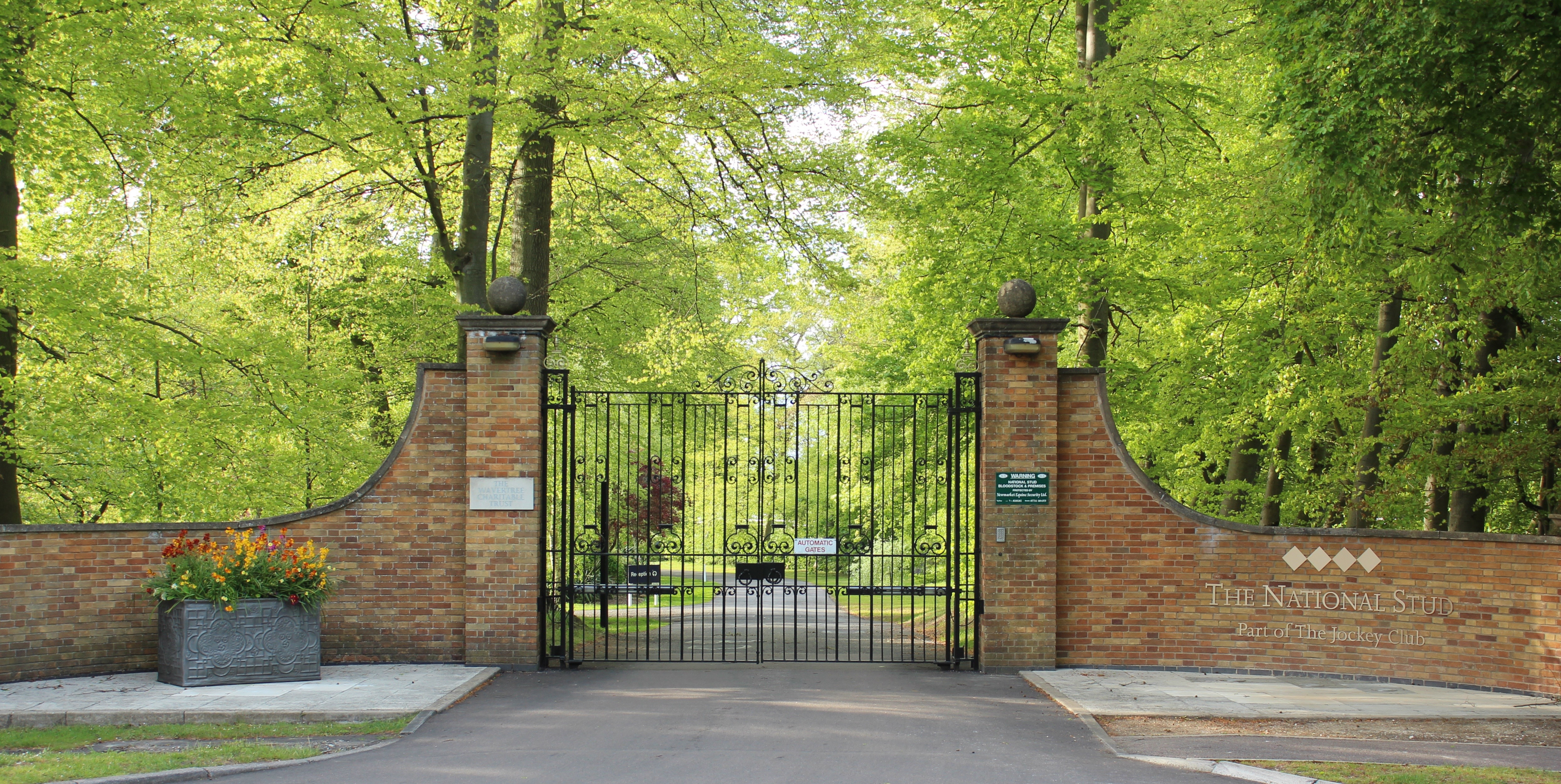
The National Stud

Newmarket is a centre for racehorse breeding, with over sixty stud farms in the town and surrounding area. As of 2026, eleven of them had standing stallions. The leading stud farms in 2022 included Cheveley Park, Godolphin, Juddmonte, Lanwades and the National Stud. Newmarket stallions standing at over £100,000 in 2026 included Frankel, Dubawi, Kingman and Too Darn Hot. The National Stud moved to Newmarket in 1966 and has been owned by the Jockey Club since 2007. As well as being home to a stallion roster and brood mares, it provides residential training courses and is the only working stud farm open to the public on a regular basis, receiving about 10,000 visitors a year on tours organised by Discover Newmarket.

=== Equine hospitals and research ===
The town is home to two equine hospitals:

- The Newmarket Equine Hospital, situated on the Cambridge Road near the July Course, was established in 2008 by the veterinary practice of Greenwood, Ellis and Partners.
- Rossdales Wquine Hospital in Exning was established in 1998 by Rossdales, a veterinary practice that had been operating in Newmarket since 1959.

The Animal Health Trust, a charity founded in 1942 to research into the diseases of horses, dogs and cats, was based in Newmarket and the nearby village Kentford, until its closure in 2020.

=== National Horseracing Museum ===
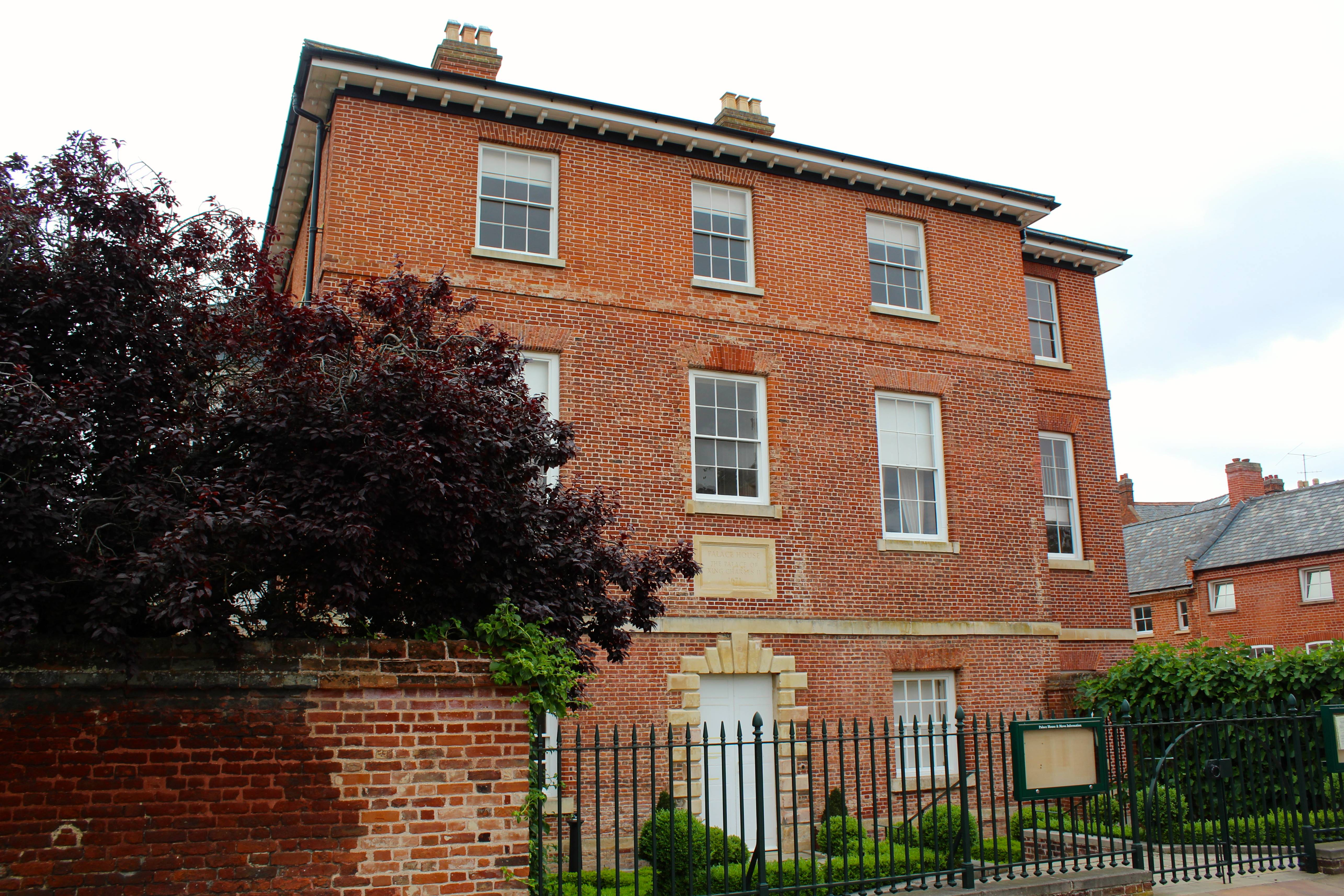
Palace House

Newmarket is home to the National Horseracing Museum, which, together with the Sporting Art Trust and Retraining of Racehorses, forms the National Heritage Centre for Horseracing & Sporting Art. The museum opened in 1983, in the Jockey Club Rooms on the High Street, and moved to larger premises in Palace Street in 2016. The Sporting Art Trust collection, which includes paintings by George Stubbs, Sir Alfred Munnings and Lucy Kemp-Welch, is housed in Palace House, the remains of the palace of Charles II. The Trainer's House and King's Yard Stables were converted into the museum galleries, while the Rothschild Yard includes stables for several retired racehorses. The five-acre grounds include a garden, paddocks and a riding arena.

=== Racing charities ===
The charities Racing Welfare and the Injured Jockeys Fund are based in Newmarket. The Peter O'Sullevan House rehabilitation and fitness centre was opened by the Injured Jockeys Fund in 2019.

=== British Racing School ===
The British Racing School was established in Newmarket in 1983 and provides training for stable staff and jockeys. The school also runs management and jockey coaching courses for the British Horseracing Authority. As of 2022, the school had 64 full-time-equivalent staff and about 70 retrained racehorses.

=== Tattersalls ===
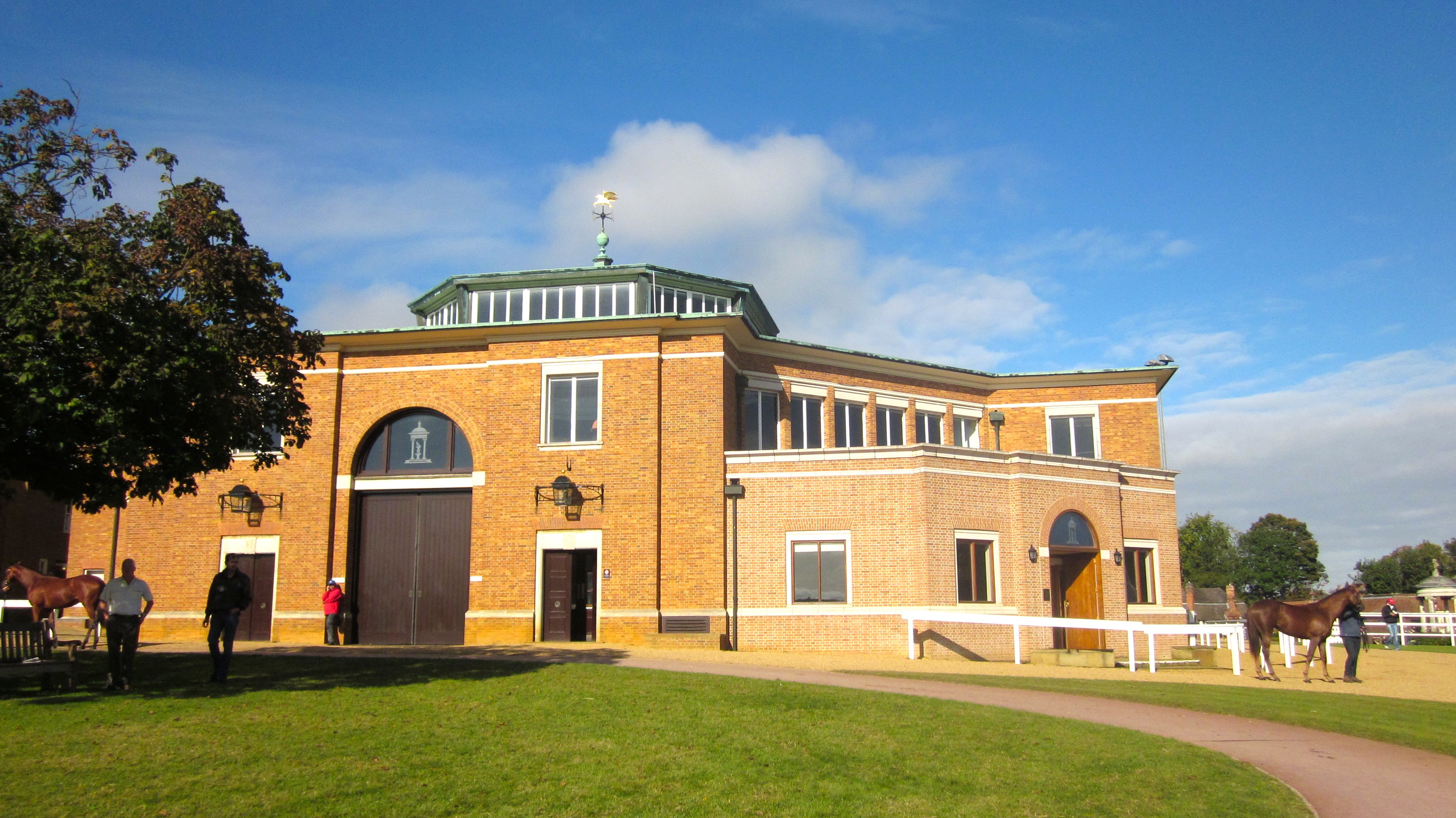
Tattersalls sales ring

The bloodstock auctioneers Tattersalls occupy Park Paddocks, a 45-acre site off The Avenue, between the High Street and the railway station. The stables were bought in 1870 and the first sale held there in July of that year. The site was developed in the 20th century, with the addition of paddocks, yards, a new administration block and a new sales ring, designed by Sir Albert Richardson. Sales at Tattersalls came to a total of £433.8 million in 2022.

=== The Jockey Club ===
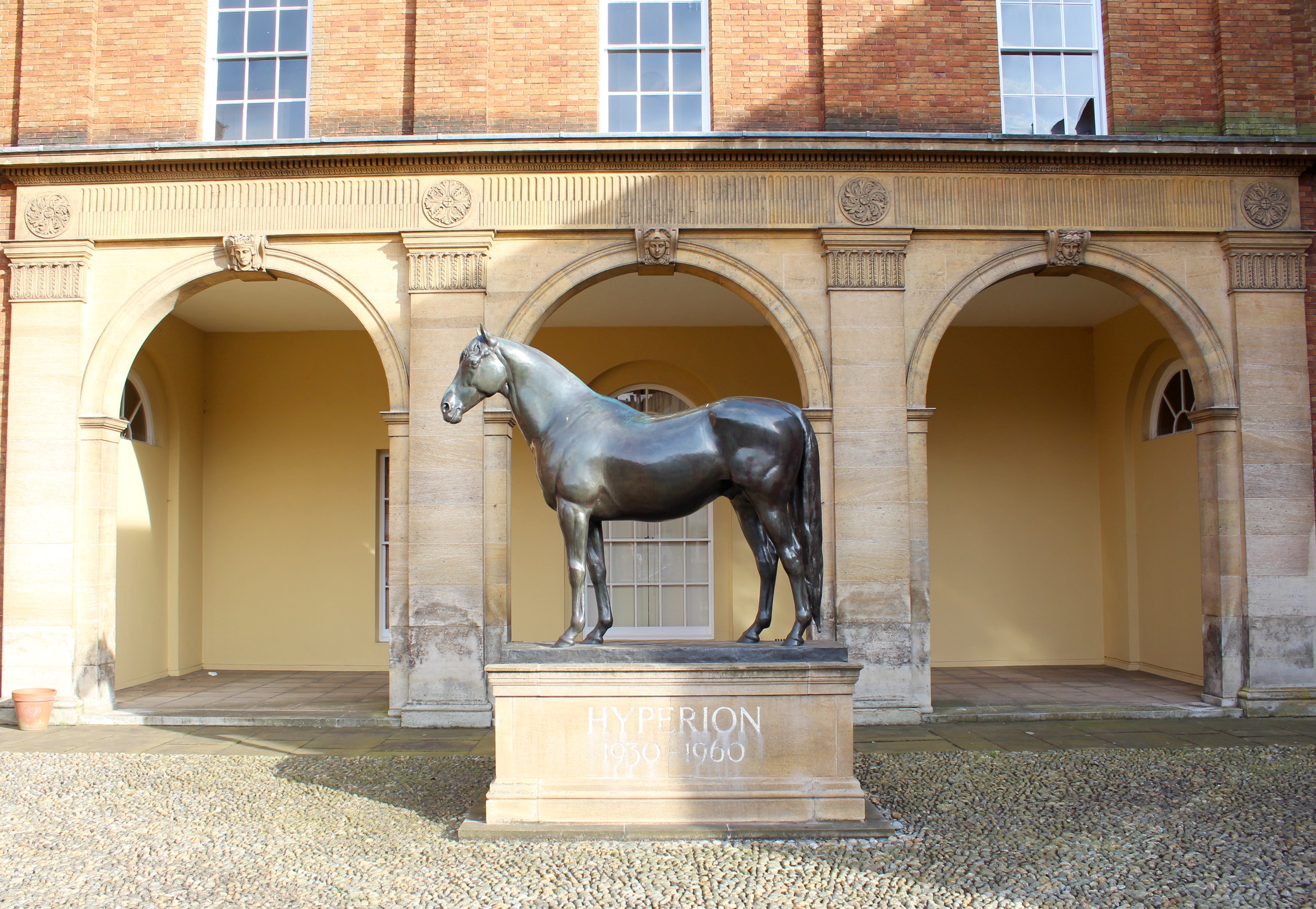
The Jockey Club Rooms

The Jockey Club moved from London to Newmarket in 1752, leasing and then buying a plot of land on the south side of the High Street. At first consisting just of coffee rooms, the buildings gradually expanded. In 1933, the original coffee rooms were given a new frontage to a design by Sir Albert Richardson. The rest of the buildings were rebuilt, also to a design by Richardson, following a fire. The Jockey Club Rooms are a private members club and include accommodation and the administrative offices of Jockey Club Estates, a company which owns the Newmarket racecourses and training grounds.

== Education ==
Newmarket has a number of primary schools which feed into the 11–18 Newmarket Academy, the town's only secondary school.

It is also home to an Air Training Corps Squadron (2417 Newmarket Squadron) and an Army Cadet Detachment.

== Hospitals ==
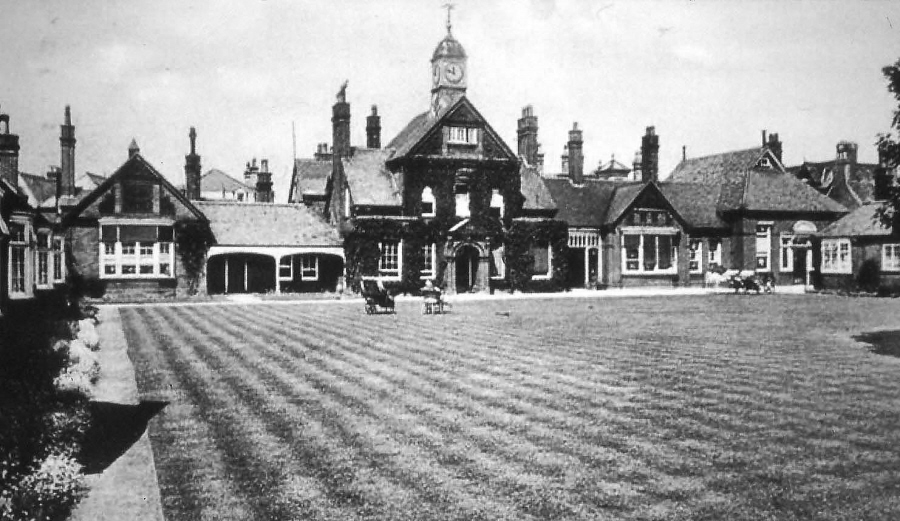
The Rous Memorial Hospital

Following the death of Admiral Rous in 1877, the Jockey Club set up a memorial fund and raised £5000 to build a hospital. The Rous Memorial Hospital on Vicarage Road opened in 1889 and included almshouses. The cottage hospital closed in 1966 and was converted into warden-controlled flats.

Newmarket Union Workhouse on Exning Road became a hospital in 1937 and was renamed Newmarket General Hospital in 1951. It was converted into flats in the 1990s, when Newmarket Community Hospital was built in the grounds. In 2025, a £15 million community diagnostic centre opened at the hospital in December 2024.

== Religion ==
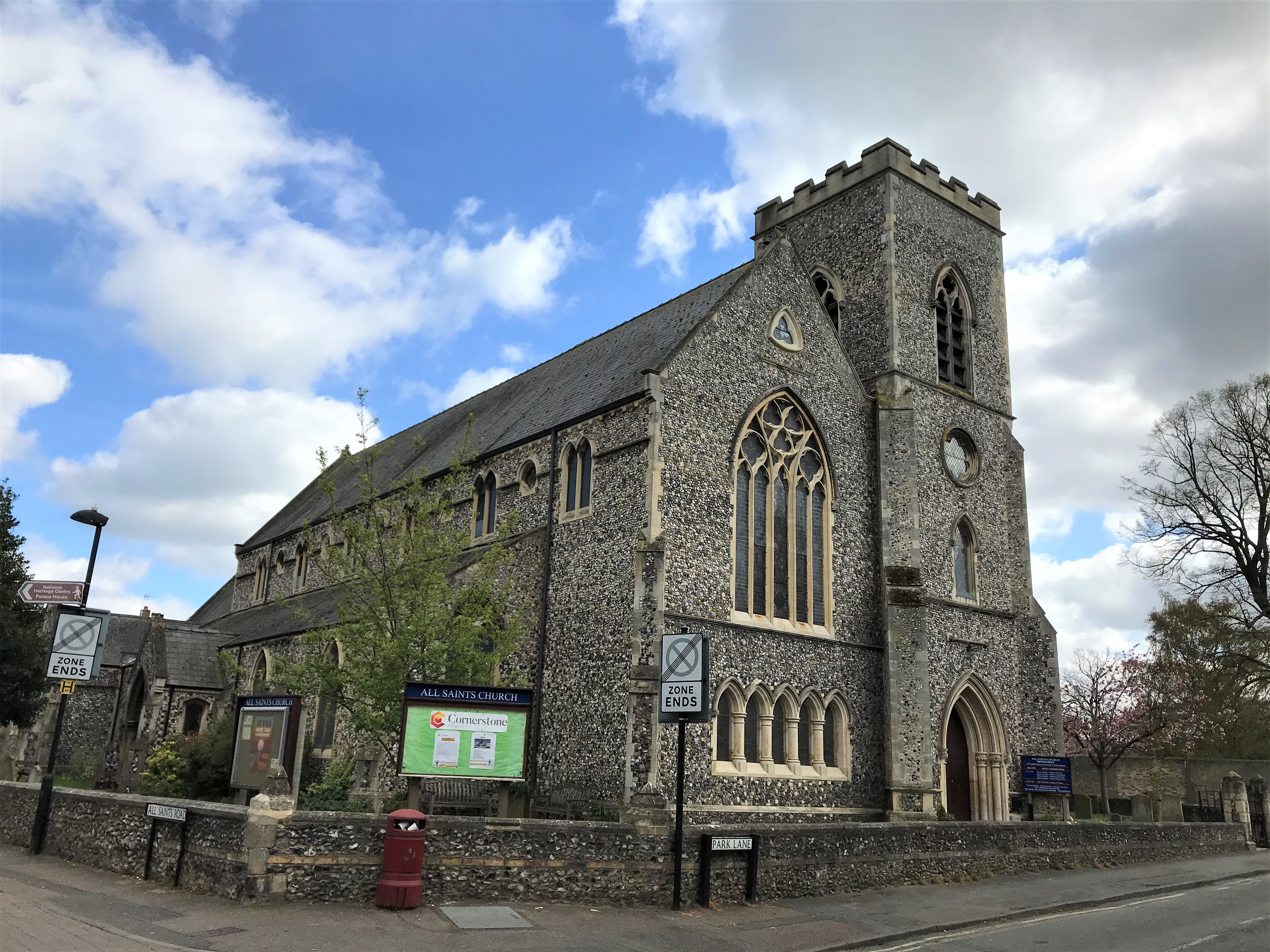
All Saints Church

St Mary's parish church stands on the site of a 13th-century chapel of ease for Exning. It was rebuilt in the 15th century and extensively restored in the 19th century. The tower and door in the south porch date from the 15th century. Stained glass by Christopher Webb was installed in the west window in 1930. All Saints parish church was, until the 16th century, a chapel of ease for Woodditton. When the court was in residence at Newmarket Palace in the 17th century, it served as a royal chapel. By the 1870s, the church had fallen into disrepair and was rebuilt.

The church of St Agnes on the Bury Road was built in 1885 by Caroline Agnes, Duchess of Montrose in memory of her second husband, William Stuart Stirling-Crawfurd. The church, which was consecrated in October 1887 as Exning St Agnes, features an organ was designed by Arthur Sullivan and a reredos sculpted by Joseph Edgar Boehm. The church of St Philip & St Etheldreda on the Exning Road was originally the chapel of Newmarket workhouse, built in 1895 and dedicated to St Etheldreda. In 1988, the church was joined by the congregation of the demolished church of St Philip and became part of the Exning parish.

The Catholic church of Our Lady Immaculate and St Etheldreda was built on Exeter Road in the 1960s, to replace the older church in All Saints Road. Christchurch in St Mary's Square is a Methodist/United Reformed Church.

The Muslim community in Newmarket is served by the Islamic Cultural Centre in St Mary's Square.

== Transport ==
A view of the station platform

Newmarket railway station lies on the Ipswich-Ely line. Greater Anglia operates generally hourly services between Cambridge, Bury St Edmunds and Ipswich.

Bus services are operated by Stephensons of Essex and Star Cabs; routes connect the town to Bury St Edmunds, Cambridge, Ely and Mildenhall. There is also a town circular route.

== Culture ==
The King's Theatre in Fitzroy Street includes a cinema.

The town is home to the PGI Protected Newmarket sausage. Produced since the 1880s, three local butchers in the town are entitled to produce these unique flavoured sausages; they are given as a prize for the annual Newmarket Town Plate.

== Media ==
Local news and television programmes are provided by BBC East and ITV Anglia.

The town is served by both BBC Radio Suffolk and BBC Radio Cambridgeshire, with commercial stations including Heart East, Star Radio and Greatest Hits Radio Cambridgeshire.

The local newspaper is the Newmarket Journal.

== Sport and leisure ==
Newmarket Leisure Centre, on Exning Road, includes swimming pools, a gym, a sports hall and outdoor pitches. The town has a tennis club on Hamilton Road, and a real tennis club on Fitzroy Street.

The local football team is Newmarket Town. In 2005–06, the club reached the quarter finals of the FA Vase.

The town also has rugby, hockey and tennis clubs, along with a golf course.

A greyhound racing track was opened around the Cricket Field Road ground, the venue used by Newmarket Town FC. The racing was independent, (Note: Meaning that it is not affiliated to the sport's governing body, the National Greyhound Racing Club.) so was known as a "flapping track". (Note: This is the nickname given to independent tracks.) The track was active shortly after World War II and is known to have also been active during 1967. (Note: The date of closure is not known.) An earlier instance of racing took place in 1933, at a venue described as the Duchess Drive Stadium.

== Notable people ==
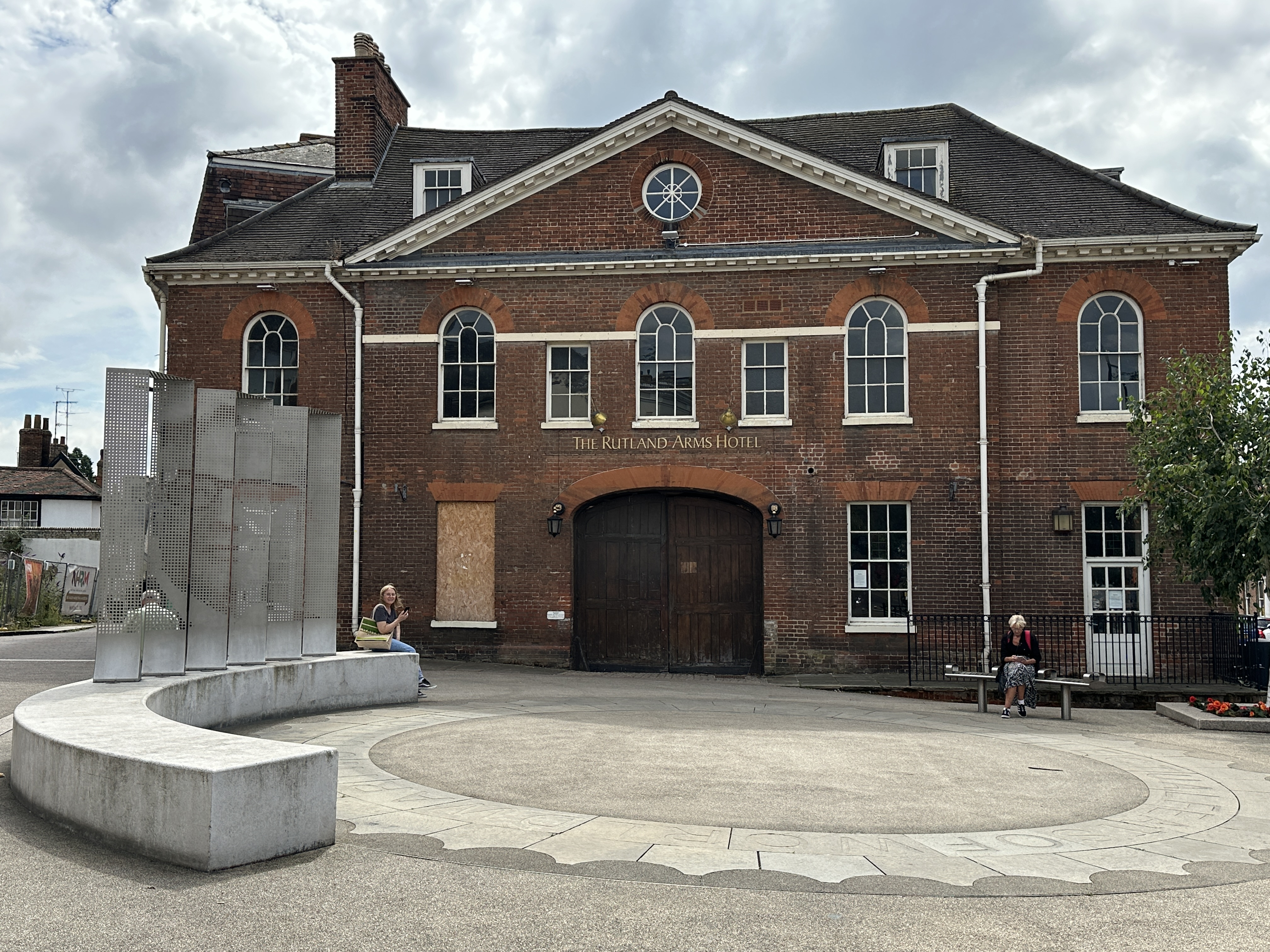
Bill Tutte memorial

Newmarket is the birthplace of the following people:

- Thomas Ashford (1859–1913), recipient of the Victoria Cross during the Second Anglo-Afghan War
- Dina Carroll (born 1968), Brit Award winner
- Ross Edgar (born 1983), 2008 Olympics cycling silver medalist
- Jamie Paul "JJ" Hamblett (born 1988), singer from Union J
- William Thomas Tutte (1917–2002), mathematician and World War II cryptoanalyst; he is celebrated by a memorial installed in 2014 outside the Rutland Arms Hotel.

== Twin towns ==
Newmarket has three sister cities, as designated by Sister Cities International:

- Le Mesnil-le-Roi, France
- Lexington, Kentucky, United States
- Maisons-Laffitte, France.

== Coat of arms ==
Coat of arms of Newmarket, Suffolk
Notes Granted 15 November 1951, to the Newmarket Urban District Council. Escutcheon Vert a Horse courant Argent on a Chief Gules a Lion rampant guardant between two Saxon Crowns Or therein as many Arrows in saltire points downwards of the second. Motto 'RESPICE FINEM' – Look to the end.

== See also ==
- Listed buildings in Newmarket, Suffolk
- Lambourn and Malton – two other major racehorse training centres in England.
