= British Horseracing Authority =

Organisation

- Predecessor: British Horseracing Board; Horseracing Regulatory Authority
- Formation: 31 July 2007; 19 years ago
- Type: Sport governing body Private company limited by guarantee
- Headquarters: Holborn Gate, 26 Southampton Buildings, London, England, WC2A 1AN
- Region served: Great Britain
- Chair: Simon Cox
- Chief Executive: Brant Dunshea
- Affiliations: International Federation of Horseracing Authorities
- Website: www.britishhorseracing.com

The British Horseracing Authority, also known as the BHA, is the regulatory authority for horse racing in Great Britain.

It was formed on 31 July 2007, after the merger of the British Horseracing Board (BHB) and the Horseracing Regulatory Authority (HRA).

Stated objectives are to: "provide the most compelling and attractive racing in the world; be seen as the world leader in race day regulation; ensure the highest standards for the sport and participants, on and away from the racecourse; promote the best for the racehorse; and represent and promote the sport and the industry."

The BHA is a member of the International Federation of Horseracing Authorities. The BHA's current chair is Simon Cox, who took over the role on 1 October 2026.

== Overview ==
The British Horseracing Authority performs a number of functions. These include:

- Race planning
- Disciplinary procedures
- Protecting the integrity of the sport
- Licensing and registering racing participants
- Setting and enforcing standards of medical care for jockeys and other participants
- Setting and enforcing common standards for British racecourses
- Research and improvements in equine science and welfare
- Regulating point-to-point racing in the UK
- Compilation of the fixture list
- Setting and enforcing the rules and orders of racing

== Integrity ==
The Authority's Integrity Services Department performs some of its most well-publicised duties. These include:

- Identifying and deterring breaches of the Rules of Racing and malpractice in horse racing
- Conducting investigations into breaches of the Rules of Racing
- Gathering information in respect of potential wrongdoing in horse racing
- Inspections of training establishments
- Monitoring real-time betting markets for suspicious betting activity

== Charity ==
Retraining of Racehorses

In April 2000, British Horseracing launched Retraining of Racehorses (RoR), the official charity for the welfare of horses who have retired from racing through injury, old age, or a lack of ability.
