= Forest Heath District =

Coordinates: 52.3461°N 0.5190°E

Forest Heath Forest Heath District
- Non-metropolitan district
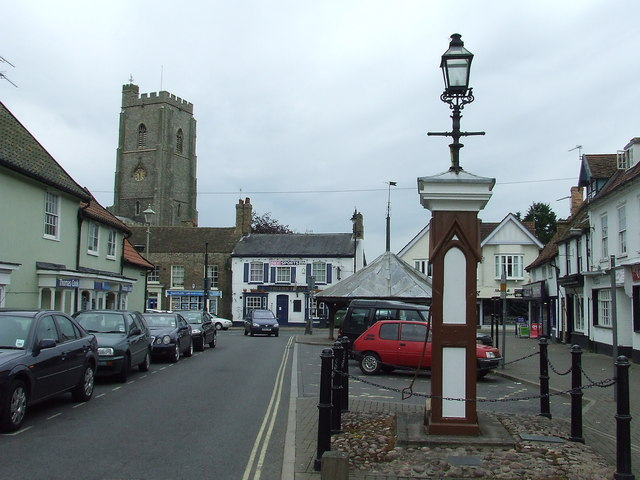
- Mildenhall

- Forest Heath shown within Suffolk
- Sovereign state: United Kingdom
- Constituent country: England
- Region: East of England
- Non-metropolitan county: Suffolk
- Status: Non-metropolitan district
- Admin HQ: Mildenhall
- Incorporated: 1 April 1974
- Abolished: 31 March 2019

Government
  - Type: Non-metropolitan district council
  - Body: Forest Heath District Council

Area
  - Total: 145.8 sq mi (377.7 km^{2})

Population (mid-2018)
  - Total: 65,500
  - Density: 449/sq mi (173/km^{2})
  - Ethnicity: 91.0% White; 3.0% Black; 1.3% S.Asian; 3.1% mixed race
- Time zone: UTC0 (GMT)
  - Summer (DST): UTC+1 (BST)
- ONS code: 42UC (ONS); E07000201 (GSS)
- OS grid reference: TL7156375032
- Website: www.westsuffolk.gov.uk

Forest Heath was a local government district in Suffolk, England. Its council was based in Mildenhall. Other towns in the district included Newmarket. The population of the district at the 2011 Census was 59,748.

The district's name reflected the fact that it contains parts of both Thetford Forest and the heathlands of Breckland. The district was formed on 1 April 1974, under the Local Government Act 1972, by a merger of Newmarket Urban District and Mildenhall Rural District. Forest Heath district was merged with the borough of St Edmundsbury on 1 April 2019 to form a new West Suffolk district.

Forest Heath was the home to two of the largest United States Air Force (USAF) airbases in the UK: RAF Lakenheath and RAF Mildenhall, as well as the headquarters of British horse racing, Newmarket Racecourse.

In the English indices of deprivation 2010 report published by the Department for Communities and Local Government, two parts of Forest Heath have the highest employment out of 32,483 areas in England.

== Communities ==
The district contained three market towns and twenty civil parishes.

=== Towns ===
- Mildenhall
- Newmarket
- Brandon

=== Civil parishes ===
- Barton Mills
- Beck Row, Holywell Row and Kenny Hill
- Cavenham
- Dalham
- Elveden
- Eriswell
- Exning
- Freckenham
- Gazeley
- Herringswell
- Higham
- Icklingham
- Kentford
- Lakenheath
- Moulton
- Red Lodge
- Santon Downham
- Tuddenham
- Worlington

== Governance ==
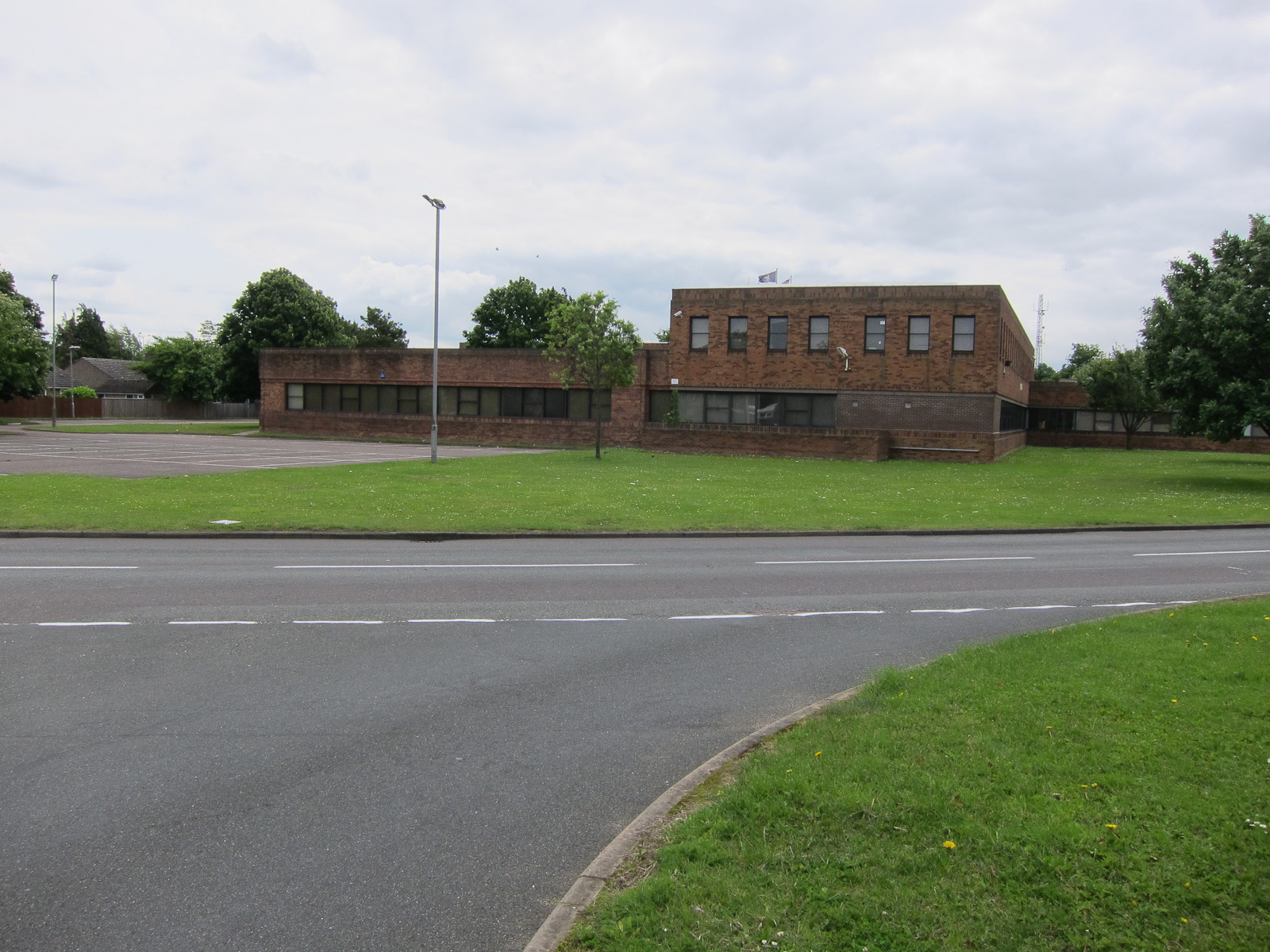
Council Offices, College Heath Road, Mildenhall

Forest Heath District Council provided district-level functions. County-level functions were provided by Suffolk County Council. The whole district was also divided into civil parishes, which provided a third tier of local government. The district council was based at offices on College Heath Road in Mildenhall. The building was purpose-built for the council and opened in 1980. After the council's abolition in 2019, the building was deemed surplus to requirements, and it was subsequently demolished.

== Education ==
The Shi-Tennoji School in UK in Herringswell, Forest Heath was in operation beginning in 1985, and ending on 17 July 2000.
