= Shi-Tennoji School in UK =

Private high school in Herringswell, Suffolk, England

- 英国四天王寺学園

Location
- Herringswell, Bury St Edmund's, Suffolk IP28 6SW; Herringswell; United Kingdom; 52.3136265°N 0.5233398999999963°E

Information
- Type: Private high school
- Closed: 2000

Shi-Tennoji School in UK (英国四天王寺学園, Eikoku Shitennōji Gakuen) was a Japanese international secondary school in Herringswell, Suffolk, England, United Kingdom, near Bury St Edmunds. The Japanese government classified the school as a Shiritsu zaigai kyoiku shisetsu (私立在外教育施設) or an overseas branch of a Japanese private school. Shi-tennoji International Limited owned the school, and the organisation intended to develop Japan-United Kingdom relations with the school.

== History ==
It was in operation beginning in 1985. The former campus includes the Herringswell Manor, built in 1901. It was used as a country house for a family in Blackheath, London. Prior to Shi-Tennoji's use, the campus was used as a school to educate children of U.S. soldiers, as well as being a Bhagwan Shree Rajneesh ashram.

Most of the students were Japanese, and it used Japanese as its main instructional medium and prepared students for entrance examinations for Japanese universities. Circa 1998 most employees lacked comprehension of the English language. The students and staff did Buddhist rituals. Lesley Downer of The Independent described the school as "like a little Japan in the middle of the English countryside."

The school closed on 17 July 2000, due to declining student figures. The Japanese Education Ministry decertified the school by 2001. By 2007 the property was being converted into residences by City & Country.

== Campus ==
The property has 8 acres (3.2 ha) of space. The Mock Tudor manor, built in 1906, is listed as a Grade II historic site. The property also had a coach house. Upon its opening Shi-Tennoji School already had two dormitory buildings and a gymnasium dating from its previous uses. Tim Sargeant of the building renovation firm City & Country Group stated the "large, dark roofs" were defining features of the dormitories. Phil McNeill of The Daily Telegraph described the gymnasium as appearing "like an aircraft hangar", and he described that structure and the pre-conversion dormitory blocks as "ugly". The school owners added a Buddhist temple, which only had low-level windows so occupants could concentrate on religious exercises. Shi-Tennoji School also had an archery court, a teahouse, and a Japanese-style water garden.

=== Conversion into flats ===
After the school's closure, the properties were turned into a 57-residence flat complex. The Tudor manor now houses ten residences; its smallest accommodation was a one bedroom unit priced at £215,000 in 2007, and the largest and most expensive was a unit on the first floor priced at £550,000 that year. The coach house is now a three-residence unit. The dormitories were converted into a pair of 15-bedroom flat blocks called The Courtyards. For aesthetic purposes, the developer added dormer windows and changed the roofs to have lighter colours.

The Buddhist temple was converted into residences with two-three bedrooms each; McNeill stated that this was possibly the first time a Buddhist temple in Great Britain was converted into flats. The developer added a second storey at the temple roof, sliding glass doors, and dormer windows, as the temple was not listed as a historic site. The ground floor rooms post-conversion still had 12-foot (3.7 m) ceilings, above the standard 8-foot (2.4 m). In 2007 the Buddhist temple conversion's apartment prices were between £485,000 and £525,000. The developer also converted the archery court and teahouse into new uses.

According to McNeill, many of the residences were "likely" to be utilized as second homes. Some residents of Herringswell tried to prevent the dormitories being converted into apartments, but this failed.
