= Herringswell =

Village in Suffolk, England

Coordinates: 52.301184°N 0.516185°E

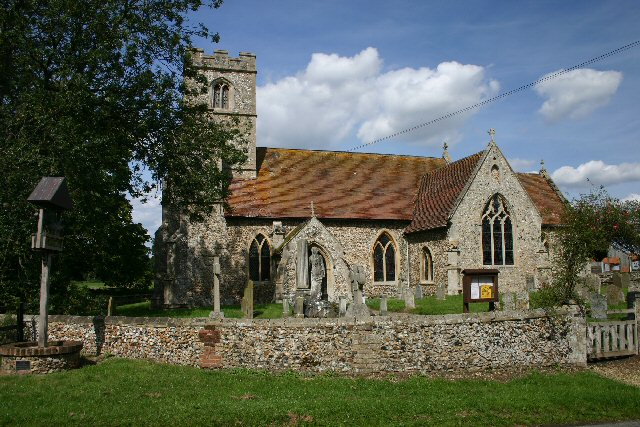
- St Ethelbert's Church, Herringswell

- Location within Suffolk
- Population: 290 (2011)
- District: West Suffolk
- Shire county: Suffolk
- Region: East
- Country: England
- Sovereign state: United Kingdom
- Post town: Bury St Edmunds
- Postcode district: IP28
- Dialling code: 01638
- Police: Suffolk
- Fire: Suffolk
- Ambulance: East of England
- UK Parliament: West Suffolk

Herringswell is a village and civil parish in the West Suffolk district of Suffolk, England. In 2005, it had a population of 190. In 2007, there were 128 voters there.

It is 6 miles (9.7 km) from Newmarket.

== History ==
In 2006, a village council successfully opposed the development of a proposed stadium, Watermark, by combining its advocacy with those of four surrounding communities.

== Composition ==
Herringswell Manor is located in the community. The Abbot of Bury St Edmunds originally owned the land, and by the early 20th century, it was the country house of a Blackheath, London family, of businessperson Arthur Ballance and his wife's family, the Peeks. The Balances/Peeks lived in the mock-Tudor manor house built in 1901. In 1965, the property was bought for £35,000 to be an American-style-curriculum boarding school for children of U.S. & Canadian families who were working internationally. In 1981, the property was sold to Bhagwan Shree Rajneesh ashram. Herringswell residents formed a council when they deemed the ashram to be gaining too much influence. The Shi-Tennoji School in UK, a Japanese Buddhist boarding school, was in operation there beginning in 1985 and ending on 17 July 2000. The former campus includes the Herringswell Manor, built in 1901. The school closed due to declining student figures. The manor house as well as the other buildings on the property have now been converted into flats.
