= Retraining of Racehorses =

- Type: Charity
- Industry: Animal welfare
- Founded: 2000
- Headquarters: United Kingdom,
- Key people: Di Arbuthnot (Chief Executive)
- Website: ror.org.uk

Retraining of Racehorses (RoR) is a national animal welfare organization in the United Kingdom. It was established by the British Horseracing Authority in 2000 and is a registered charity under English and Scottish law. It is the official charity for the welfare of horses who have retired from racing through injury, old age or a lack of ability. It is based at the National Horseracing Museum in Newmarket.

== Activity ==
RoR performs the following actions:

- Raises money to support the retraining and rehoming of former racehorses
- Provides facilities for the care, retraining and rehoming of former racehorses
- Raises the profile of racehorses to other equestrian activities
- Operates education programmes to ensure handlers are adequately trained to care for the horses

RoR facilitates revenue grants and funds centre improvements and property purchases for four retraining centres:

- Greatwood Caring for Retired Racehorses
- HEROS (Homing Ex-racehorses Organisation Scheme)
- Moorcroft Racehorse Welfare Centre
- Thoroughbred Rehabilitation Centre
- Darley Stud Management

In 2009, Princess Haya became RoR's first Patron. Other patrons include Frankie Dettori, Clare Balding and Richard Johnson.

== Notable horses ==
Among the horses helped by the charity are the Champion Hurdler Make A Stand and the Grand National winners Royal Athlete and Bindaree.

One graduate of the scheme is Summon Up Theblood who represented Brazil in the Three-day Event at the 2016 Summer Olympics.
