= List of schools in Suffolk =

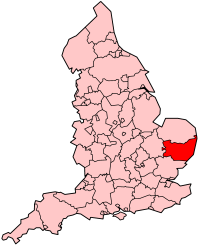

This is a list of schools in Suffolk, England.

== State-funded schools ==
=== Primary schools ===
- Abbots Green Primary Academy, Bury St Edmunds
- Abbot's Hall Community Primary School, Stowmarket
- Acton CE Primary School, Acton
- The Albert Pye Community Primary School, Beccles
- Aldeburgh Primary School, Aldeburgh
- All Saints CE Primary School, Newmarket
- All Saints CE Primary School, Laxfield
- All Saints CE Primary School, Lawshall
- Bacton Primary School, Bacton
- Bardwell CE Primary School, Bardwell
- Barnby and North Cove Community Primary School, Barnby
- Barnham CE Primary School, Barnham
- Barningham CE Primary School, Barningham
- Barrow CE Primary School, Barrow
- Bawdsey CE Primary School, Bawdsey
- Bealings School, Little Bealings
- Beaumont Community Primary School, Hadleigh
- Beccles Primary Academy, Beccles
- Beck Row Primary Academy, Beck Row
- Bedfield CE Primary School, Bedfield
- The Beeches Community Primary School, Ipswich
- Benhall St Mary's CE Primary School, Benhall
- Bentley CE Primary School, Bentley
- Bildeston Primary School, Bildeston
- Birchwood Primary School, Martlesham Heath
- Blundeston CE Primary School, Blundeston
- Bosmere Community Primary School, Needham Market
- Boxford CE Primary School, Boxford
- Bramfield CE Primary School, Bramfield
- Bramford CE Primary School, Bramford
- Brampton CE Primary School, Brampton
- Britannia Primary School, Ipswich
- Broke Hall Community Primary School, Ipswich
- Brooklands Primary School, Brantham
- Bucklesham Primary School, Bucklesham
- Bungay Primary School, Bungay
- Bures CE Primary School, Bures St. Mary
- Burton End Primary Academy, Haverhill
- Castle Hill Junior & Infant School
- Capel St Mary CE Primary School, Capel St Mary
- Carlton Colville Primary School, Carlton Colville
- Castle Hill Infant School, Ipswich
- Castle Hill Junior School, Ipswich
- Cavendish CE Primary School, Cavendish
- Cedars Park Community Primary School, Stowmarket
- Cedarwood Primary School, Kesgrave
- Charsfield CE Primary School, Charsfield
- Chelmondiston CE Primary School, Chelmondiston
- Chilton Community Primary School, Stowmarket
- Clare Community Primary School, Clare
- Claydon Primary School, Claydon
- Clements Primary Academy, Haverhill
- Cliff Lane Primary School, Ipswich
- Clifford Road Primary School, Ipswich
- Cockfield CE Primary School, Cockfield
- Coldfair Green Community Primary School, Knodishall
- Colneis Junior School, Felixtowe
- Combs Ford Primary School, Stowmarket
- Copdock Primary School, Copdock
- Corton CE Primary School, Corton
- Coupals Primary Academy, Haverhill
- Crawford's CE Primary School, Haughley
- Creeting St Mary CE Primary School, Creeting St Mary
- Dale Hall Community Primary School, Ipswich
- Dell Primary School, Oulton Broad
- Dennington CE Primary School, Dennington
- Earl Soham Community Primary School, Earl Soham
- East Bergholt CE Primary School, East Bergholt
- Easton Primary School, Easton
- Edgar Sewter Community Primary School, Halesworth
- Elm Tree Community Primary School, Lowestoft
- Elmsett CE Primary School, Elmsett
- Elmswell Community Primary School, Elmswell
- Elveden CE Primary Academy, Elveden
- Exning Primary School, Exning
- Eyke CE Primary School, Eyke
- Fairfield Infant School, Felixstowe
- Forest Academy, Brandon
- Framlingham Sir Robert Hitcham's CE Primary School, Framlingham
- Freeman Community Primary School, Stowupland
- Fressingfield CE Primary School, Fressingfield
- Gislingham CE Primary School, Gislingham
- Glade Academy, Brandon
- Glemsford Primary Academy, Glemsford
- Gorseland Primary School, Martlesham Heath
- Grace Cook Primary School, Stowmarket
- Grange Community Primary School, Felixtowe
- Great Barton CE Primary Academy, Great Barton
- Great Finborough CE Primary School, Great Finborough
- Great Heath Academy, Mildenhall
- Great Waldingfield CE Primary School, Great Waldingfield
- Great Whelnetham CE Primary School, Great Whelnetham
- Grove Primary School, Carlton Colville
- Grundisburgh Primary School, Grundisburgh
- Guildhall Feoffment Community Primary School, Bury St Edmunds
- Gunton Primary Academy, Lowestoft
- Gusford Community Primary School, Ipswich
- Hadleigh Community Primary School, Hadleigh
- Halifax Primary School, Ipswich
- Handford Hall Primary School, Ipswich
- Hardwick Primary School, Bury St Edmunds
- Hartest CE Primary School, Hartest
- Heath Primary School, Kesgrave
- Helmingham Primary School, Helmingham
- Henley Primary School, Henley
- Hillside Primary School, Ipswich
- Hintlesham and Chattisham CE Primary School, Hintlesham
- Holbrook Primary School, Holbrook
- Hollesley Primary School, Hollesley
- Holton St Peter Community Primary School, Holton St Peter
- Honington CE Primary School, Honington
- Hopton CE Primary School, Hopton
- Houldsworth Valley Primary Academy, Newmarket
- Howard Primary School, Bury St Edmunds
- Hundon Community Primary School, Hundon
- Ickworth Park Primary School, Ickworth
- Ilketshall St Lawrence School, Ilketshall St Lawrence
- Ixworth CE Primary School, Ixworth
- Kedington Primary Academy, Kedington
- Kelsale CE Primary School, Kelsale
- Kersey CE Primary School, Kersey
- Kessingland CE Primary Academy, Kessingland
- Kingsfleet Primary School, Felixtowe
- Kyson Primary School, Woodbridge
- Lakenheath Community Primary School, Lakenheath
- Langer Primary Academy, Felixtowe
- Laureate Community Academy, Newmarket
- Lavenham Community Primary School, Lavenham
- Leiston Primary School, Leiston
- The Limes Primary Academy, Oulton
- Long Melford CE Primary School, Long Melford
- Martlesham Primary School, Martlesham
- Mellis CE Primary School, Mellis
- Melton Primary School, Melton
- Mendham Primary School, Mendham
- Mendlesham Primary School, Mendlesham
- Middleton Community Primary School, Middleton
- Morland CE Primary School, Ipswich
- Moulton CE Primary School, Moulton
- Murrayfield Primary Academy, Ipswich
- Nacton CE Primary School, Nacton
- Nayland Primary School, Nayland
- New Cangle Community Primary School, Haverhill
- Northfield St Nicholas Primary Academy, Lowestoft
- Norton CE Primary School, Norton
- The Oaks Primary School, Ipswich
- Occold Primary School, Occold
- Old Newton CE Primary School, Old Newton
- Orford CE Primary School, Orford
- Otley Primary School, Otley
- Oulton Broad Primary School, Oulton Broad
- Paddocks Primary School, Newmarket
- Pakefield Primary School, Pakefield
- Palgrave CE Primary School, Palgrave
- Phoenix St Peter Academy, Lowestoft
- The Pines Primary School, Red Lodge
- Piper's Vale Primary Academy, Ipswich
- Place Farm Primary Academy, Haverhill
- Poplars Community Primary School, Lowestoft
- Pot Kiln Primary School, Great Cornard
- Ranelagh Primary School, Ipswich
- Rattlesden CE Primary Academy, Rattlesden
- Ravensmere Infant School, Beccles
- Ravenswood Community Primary School, Ipswich
- Red Oak Primary School, Lowestoft
- Rendlesham Primary School, Rendlesham
- Reydon Primary School, Reydon
- Ringsfield CE Primary School, Ringsfield
- Ringshall School, Ringshall
- Risby CE Primary School, Risby
- Roman Hill Primary School, Lowestoft
- Rose Hill Primary, Ipswich
- Rougham CE Primary School, Rougham
- Rushmere Hall Primary School, Ipswich
- St Benet's RC Primary School, Beccles
- St Botolph's CE Primary School, Botesdale
- St Christopher's CE Primary School, Red Lodge
- St Edmund's RC Primary School, Bungay
- St Edmund's RC Primary School, Bury St Edmunds
- St Edmund's Primary School, Hoxne
- St Edmundsbury CE Primary School, Bury St Edmunds
- St Felix RC Primary School, Haverhill
- St Gregory CE Primary School, Sudbury
- St Helen's Primary School, Ipswich
- St John's CE Primary School, Ipswich
- St Joseph's RC Primary School, Sudbury
- St Louis RC Academy, Newmarket
- St Margaret's CE Primary School, Ipswich
- St Margaret's Primary Academy, Lowestoft
- St Mark's RC Primary School, Ipswich
- St Mary's CE Academy, Mildenhall
- St Mary's CE Primary School, Hadleigh
- St Mary's CE Primary School, Woodbridge
- St Mary's RC Primary School, Ipswich
- St Mary's RC Primary School, Lowestoft
- St Matthew's CE Primary School, Ipswich
- St Pancras RC Primary School, Ipswich
- St Peter and St Paul CE Primary School, Eye
- Sandlings Primary School, Sutton
- Saxmundham Primary School, Saxmundham
- Sebert Wood Community Primary School, Bury St Edmunds
- SET Felix Primary, Felixtowe
- Sexton's Manor Community Primary School, Bury St Edmunds
- Shotley Community Primary School, Shotley
- Sidegate Primary School, Ipswich
- Sir Robert Hitcham CE School, Debenham
- Snape Primary School, Snape
- Somerleyton Primary School, Somerleyton
- Somersham Primary School, Somersham
- Southwold Primary School, Southwold
- Springfield Infant School and Nursery, Ipswich
- Springfield Junior School, Ipswich
- Sprites Primary Academy, Ipswich
- Sproughton CE Primary School, Sproughton
- Stanton Community Primary School, Stanton
- Stoke-by-Nayland CE Primary School, Stoke-by-Nayland
- Stonham Aspal CE Primary School, Stonham Aspal
- Stradbroke CE Primary School, Stradbroke
- Stratford St Mary Primary School, Stratford St Mary
- Stutton CE Primary School, Stutton
- Tattingstone CE Primary School, Tattingstone
- Thorndon CE Primary School, Thorndon
- Thurlow CE Primary School, Little Thurlow
- Thurston CE Primary Academy, Thurston
- Tollgate Primary School, Bury St Edmunds
- Trimley St Martin Primary School, Trimley St Martin
- Trimley St Mary Primary School, Trimley St Mary
- Trinity CE Primary School, Combs
- Tudor CE Primary School, Sudbury
- Waldringfield Primary School, Waldringfield
- Walsham-le-Willows CE Primary School, Walsham le Willows
- Wells Hall Primary School, Great Cornard
- Wenhaston Primary School, Wenhaston
- West Row Academy, West Row
- Westfield Primary Academy, Haverhill
- Westgate Community Primary School, Bury St Edmunds
- Westwood Primary School, Lowestoft
- Wetheringsett CE Primary School, Wetheringsett
- Whatfield CE Primary School, Whatfield
- Whitehouse Community Primary School, Ipswich
- Wickham Market Primary School, Wickham Market
- Wickhambrook Primary Academy, Wickhambrook
- Wilby CE Primary School, Wilby
- The Willows Primary School, Ipswich
- Witnesham Primary School, Witnesham
- Wood Ley Community Primary School, Stowmarket
- Woodbridge Primary School, Woodbridge
- Woodhall Primary School, Sudbury
- Woods Loke Primary School, Oulton Broad
- Woolpit Primary Academy, Woolpit
- Worlingham CE Primary School, Worlingham
- Worlingworth CE Primary School, Worlingworth
- Wortham Primary School, Wortham
- Yoxford & Peasenhall Primary Academy, Yoxford

=== Secondary schools ===
- Alde Valley Academy, Leiston
- Benjamin Britten Academy, Lowestoft
- Breckland School, Brandon
- Bungay High School, Bungay
- Bury St Edmunds County High School, Bury St Edmunds
- Castle Manor Academy, Haverhill
- Chantry Academy, Ipswich
- Claydon High School, Ipswich
- Copleston High School, Ipswich
- Debenham High School, Debenham
- East Bergholt High School, East Bergholt
- East Point Academy Lowestoft
- Farlingaye High School, Woodbridge
- Felixstowe Academy, Felixstowe
- Hadleigh High School, Hadleigh
- Hartismere School, Eye
- Holbrook Academy, Holbrook near Ipswich
- Ipswich Academy, Ipswich
- Kesgrave High School, Kesgrave
- King Edward VI School, Bury St Edmunds
- Mildenhall College Academy, Mildenhall
- Newmarket Academy, Newmarket
- Northgate High School, Ipswich
- Ormiston Denes Academy, Lowestoft
- Ormiston Endeavour Academy, Ipswich
- Ormiston Sudbury Academy, Sudbury
- Pakefield High School, Lowestoft
- St Alban's Catholic High School, Ipswich
- St Benedict's Catholic School, Bury St Edmunds
- Samuel Ward Academy, Haverhill
- SET Beccles School, Beccles
- SET Ixworth Free School, Ixworth
- SET Saxmundham School, Saxmundham
- Sir John Leman High School, Beccles
- Stoke High School, Maidenhall
- Stour Valley Community School, Clare
- Stowmarket High School, Stowmarket
- Stowupland High School, Stowupland
- Stradbroke High School, Stradbroke
- Sybil Andrews Academy, Bury St Edmunds
- Thomas Gainsborough School, Great Cornard
- Thomas Mills High School, Framlingham
- Thurston Community College, Thurston
- Westbourne Academy, Ipswich

=== Special and alternative schools ===
- The Albany, Bury St Edmunds
- Alderwood Academy, Ipswich
- Ashley School, Lowestoft
- The Attic, Bungay
- The Bridge School, Ipswich
- Castle East School, Bungay
- Chalk Hill, Sudbury
- Churchill Special Free School, Haverhill
- First Base, Bury St Edmunds
- First Base, Ipswich
- Hillside Special School, Sudbury
- Horizon School, Bungay
- Olive AP Academy Suffolk, Stowmarket
- Parkside Academy, Ipswich
- Priory School, Bury St Edmunds
- Riverwalk School, Bury St Edmunds
- St Christopher's Academy, Ipswich
- Sir Bobby Robson School, Ipswich
- Sir Peter Hall School, Bury St Edmunds
- Stone Lodge Academy, Ipswich
- Sunrise Academy, Carlton Colville
- Thomas Wolsey Ormiston Academy, Ipswich
- Warren School, Lowestoft
- Westbridge Academy, Ipswich
- Woodbridge Road Academy, Ipswich

=== Further education ===
- Abbeygate Sixth Form College
- Easton & Otley College
- Lowestoft College
- Lowestoft Sixth Form College
- One
- Suffolk New College
- West Suffolk College

== Independent schools ==
=== Primary and preparatory schools ===
- Barnardiston Hall Preparatory School, Barnardiston
- Fairstead House School, Newmarket
- Old Buckenham Hall School, Brettenham
- The Old School, Henstead
- Orwell Park School, Nacton
- South Lee School, Bury St Edmunds

=== Senior and all-through schools ===
- Brookes UK, Risby
- Culford School, Culford
- Felixstowe International College, Felixstowe
- Finborough School, Great Finborough
- Framlingham College, Framlingham
- Ipswich High School, Woolverstone
- Ipswich School, Ipswich
- The Meadows Montessori School, Ipswich
- OneSchool Global UK, Stoke-by-Nayland
- Royal Hospital School, Holbrook
- Saint Felix School, Reydon
- St Joseph's College, Ipswich
- Stoke College, Stoke-by-Clare
- Summerhill School, Leiston
- Woodbridge School, Woodbridge

=== Special and alternative schools ===
- Acorn Cottage The Lodge, Stowmarket
- Bramfield House School, Bramfield
- Broadlands Hall, Little Wratting
- Cambian Dunbroch School, Newmarket
- Catch 22 Include Primary School Suffolk, Ipswich
- Centre Academy East Anglia, Brettenham
- Compass Community School Aylward Park, Leiston
- Gable End, Hitcham
- Liberty Lodge Independent School, Ipswich
- Ness Point School, Lowestoft
- New Skill Centre, Ipswich
- On Track Education Centre, Mildenhall
- The Ryes College, Assington
- Wetheringsett Manor School, Wetheringsett
