= Blackbourn Hundred =

Historical division of Suffolk, England

Coordinates: 52.0°N 1.11°E

Blackbourn Hundred

Blackbourn was a hundred of Suffolk, consisting of 66,272 acres (26,819 ha).

Blackbourn hundred was situated in the north-west of Suffolk. Its northern boundary is the Little Ouse forming the border with Norfolk, and the River Lark forms part of its western boundary.

The hundred appears in the Domesday Book as Blachruna and Blackebrune meaning "black bourn", where a bourn is a stream. The stream in question is that which flows north through Ixworth, Bardwell, and Fakenham Magna to the Little Ouse at Euston and is still known as the Black Bourn.

== Parishes ==
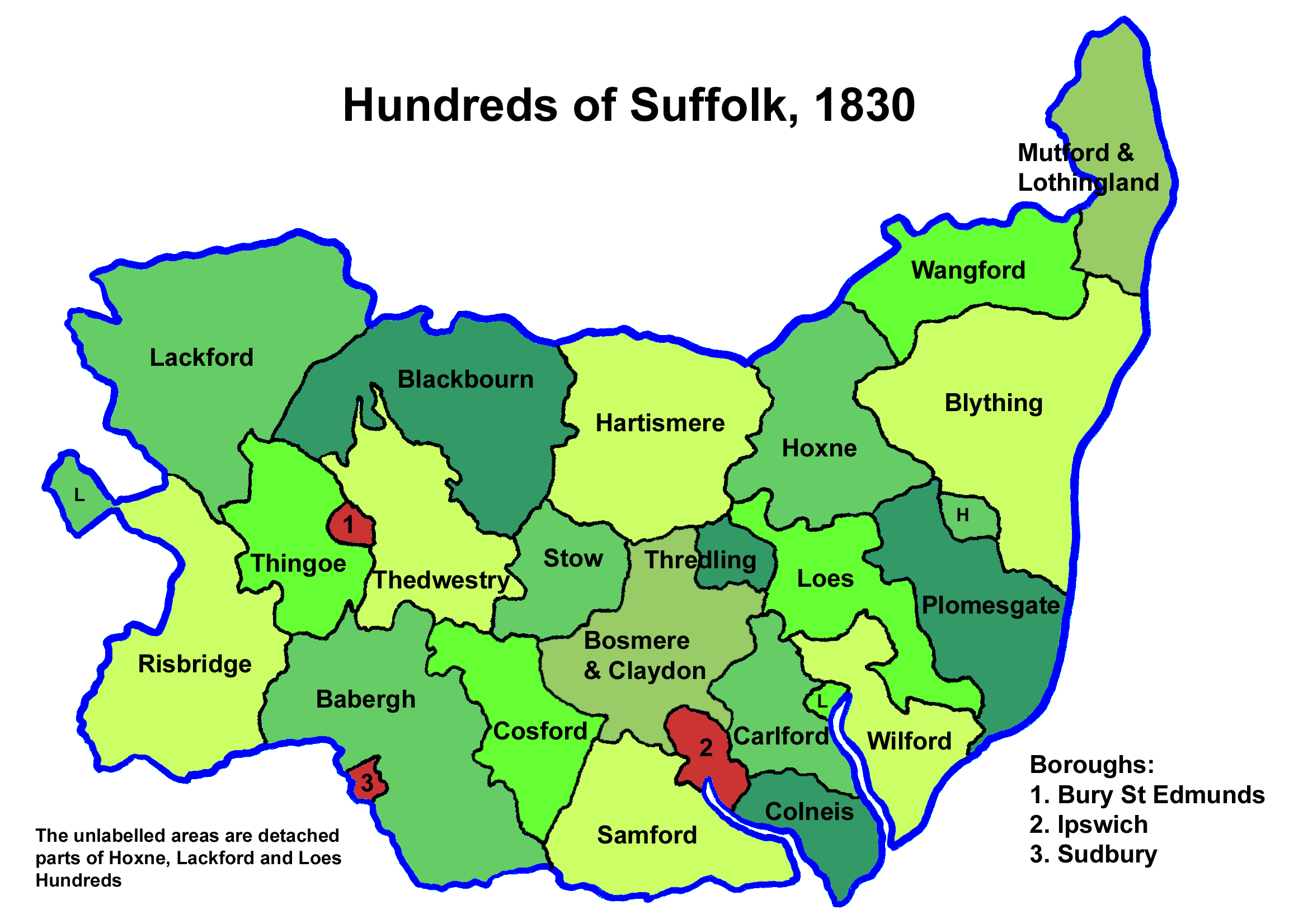
Suffolk hundreds

Blackbourn Hundred consisted of the following 34 parishes:

Parish	Area (acres)
Badwell Ash	1860
Bardwell	3142
Barnham	5184
Barningham	1555
Coney Weston	1321
Culford	2490
Elmswell	2021
Euston	3780
Fakenham Magna	2155
Great Ashfield	2030
Hepworth	1640
Hinderclay	1400
Honington	1204
Hopton	1322
Hunston	1120
Ingham	1809
Ixworth	2213
Ixworth Thorpe	1000
Knettishall	1025
Langham	1270
Little Livermere	1433
Market Weston	1090
Norton	2450
Rickinghall	1966
Rushford (part)	1000
Sapiston	1155
Stanton, Suffolk	3254
Stowlangtoft	1358
Thelnetham	1721
Troston	1770
Walsham-le-Willows	2760
Wattisfield	1600
West Stow	3050
Wordwell	2120
