= Coney Weston =

Village and civil parish in England

Coordinates: 52.367°N 0.867°E

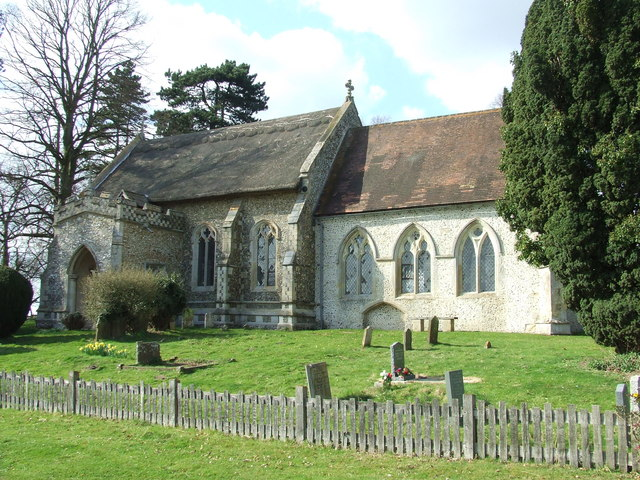
- Church of St Mary

- Location within Suffolk
- Population: 394 (2011)
- District: West Suffolk
- Shire county: Suffolk
- Region: East
- Country: England
- Sovereign state: United Kingdom
- Post town: Bury St Edmunds
- Postcode district: IP31
- Dialling code: 01359
- UK Parliament: West Suffolk

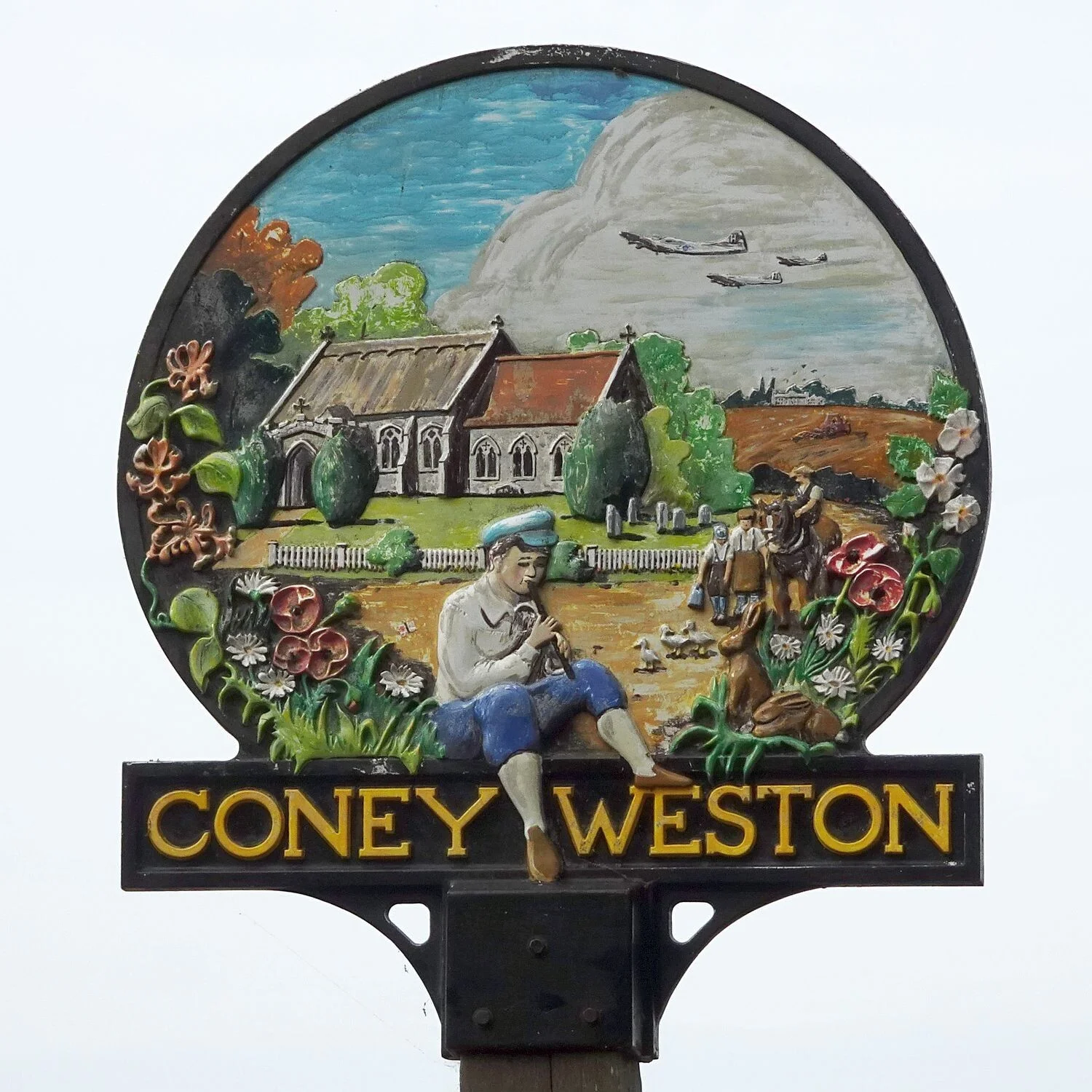
Coney Weston village sign

Coney Weston is a village and civil parish in Suffolk, England, within the West Suffolk district. It is a primarily rural residential town that has dormitory town status. It is 5 miles (8 km) north of Ixworth and 12 miles (19 km) from Bury St Edmunds

== Etymology ==
Coney Weston has a different meaning to other towns with the name Weston: it is not a true Weston (where the origin is from Old English west-tun "western farm, village or estate") but is a hybrid name, from Old Norse konungr "king" (cognate with Old English cyning "king") and Old English tun "farm". The name was recorded as Cunungestuna in the Domesday Book in 1086.

== History ==
Coney Weston was recorded in the Domesday Book as "Cunegestuna" in 1086 with a population of 16 households; 12 freemen, 3 smallholders, & 1 slave.

RAF Knettishall was built close to Coney Weston from late 1942 by W&G French and occupied by the USAF 388th Bomb Group from June 1943 until April 1945. Flying Boeing B-17 Flying Fortress aircraft they completed 306 missions, losing almost 180 aircraft to enemy action and other causes. Perhaps their most famous aircraft was called Thomas Paine (named after a son of nearby Thetford). Named at a civic ceremony in honour of Paine’s subsequent contribution to the young American colony’s quest for independence. This aircraft survived many missions until it overshot the runway and ended up in a field. Despite repairs it was subsequently retired from active service.

Robert Clarke, a farm labourer, invented the tin whistle in Coney Weston in 1843. The recent invention of tin plate induced him to commission a local blacksmith to make a design in metal of the wooden whistle fipple flute. The design worked and he left to go to Manchester to have them factory produced. The resulting cheap and easy to play instrument was a huge success and he eventually was wealthy enough to return to Coney Weston and buy the farm he had once been a labourer on. Source: https://www.clarketinwhistle.com/our-history

== Current Day ==
Coney Weston is stretched along two roads, Thetford Road (going from the north west to south-east) and The Street (heading east).

In 1988 the population of the village was doubled by a boundary change which officially incorporated the Swan end of Barningham into Coney Weston. At present there are 323 people on the electoral roll living in around 150 houses.

The small church of St Mary (OS grid TL9778) is of the English Decorated style of the mid-14th century. Its nave roof is thatch on the original scissor truss roof. The tower fell in 1690 and was not rebuilt. It is not known for certain why the church stands a mile to the east away from the village. However, there was a tunnel from the cellar that connected the Hall to St Mary. The entrance of which can still be discerned in the brickwork under the Hall. The church has regular services and is part of the United Benefice of Stanton, Hopton, Market Weston, Barningham & Coney Weston.

There are no shops but there is a pub (Swan IP31 1DN), three farms, two builders yards, hairdressers, a cattery, a sawmill and timber yard, a wood sculpture yard, a nursery, a game farm and a telephone exchange.

The Swan, on the Thetford Rd has hosted Frogstock in 2009 and may return sometime in the future and an incredibly well funded bowls club.

For recreation there is a playing field which had a small children's playground. There is also a well-used village hall. There are five public footpaths.

The village school was closed in the 1950s but there are primary schools at Barningham and Hopton and secondary schools at Blackbourne Middle School at Stanton and Thurston Upper School.

There is no doctor’s surgery in the village but there are surgeries locally at Hopton and Stanton.

Two miles from the Norfolk/Suffolk border.

== Notable residents ==
- John Patteson (1790-1861); judge.
- Robin Leonard Bidwell (1927-1994); orientalist and author.
- Charles FitzRoy, 10th Duke of Grafton (1892-1970); aristocrat, soldier, politician, and farmer.
- Robert Clarke (1816-?); inventor of the tin whistle.
