= Thedwastre =

Thedwastre can refer to:

- "Theodward's tree", a supposed historic tree in Thurston, Suffolk
- Thedwastre Hundred, a defunct hundred of the ceremonial county of Suffolk, named for the tree
- Thedwastre Rural District, a defunct rural district in the administrative county of West Suffolk, named after the hundred
