= Thedwastre Hundred =

Hundred of the county of Suffolk, England

Coordinates: 52.23°N 0.75°E

Thedwastry Hundred

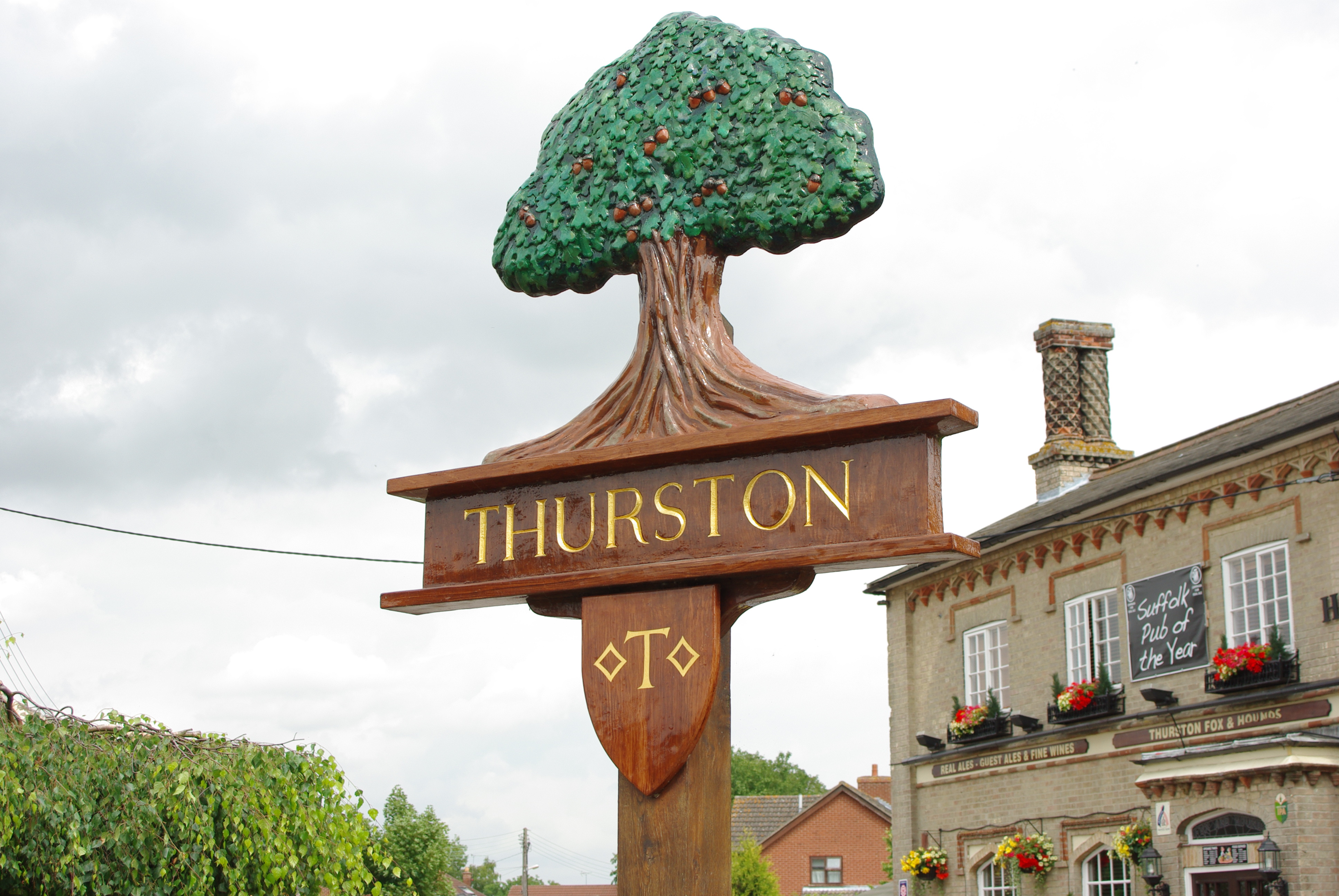
Thurston village sign depicting "Theodward's tree"

Thedwastre (also Thedwestry) was a hundred of the county of Suffolk, England covering an area of 40,362 acres (163.34 km^{2}). It formed part of the Liberty of Saint Edmund, under the jurisdiction of the abbots of Bury St Edmunds.

The hundred is about twelve miles (19 km) in length and six miles (9.7 km) wide. It is bounded on the west by the borough of Bury St Edmunds and Thingoe Hundred, on the north and east by Blackbourn and Stow Hundreds, and on the south by Cosford and Babergh Hundreds. It is a fertile district with undulating terrain, and watered by streams which rise within its limits and feed the rivers Thet, Gipping, Lark and Brett.

It is in the Deanery of Thedwestry, the Archdeaconry of Sudbury, the Diocese of Ely and Liberty of St Edmund. It contains no town of any size, but Bury and Ixworth are on its borders.

Listed as Theivardestreu in the Domesday Book of 1086, the name derives from "Theodward's tree", presumably a notable tree where the Hundred Court used to meet in Thurston.

== Parishes ==
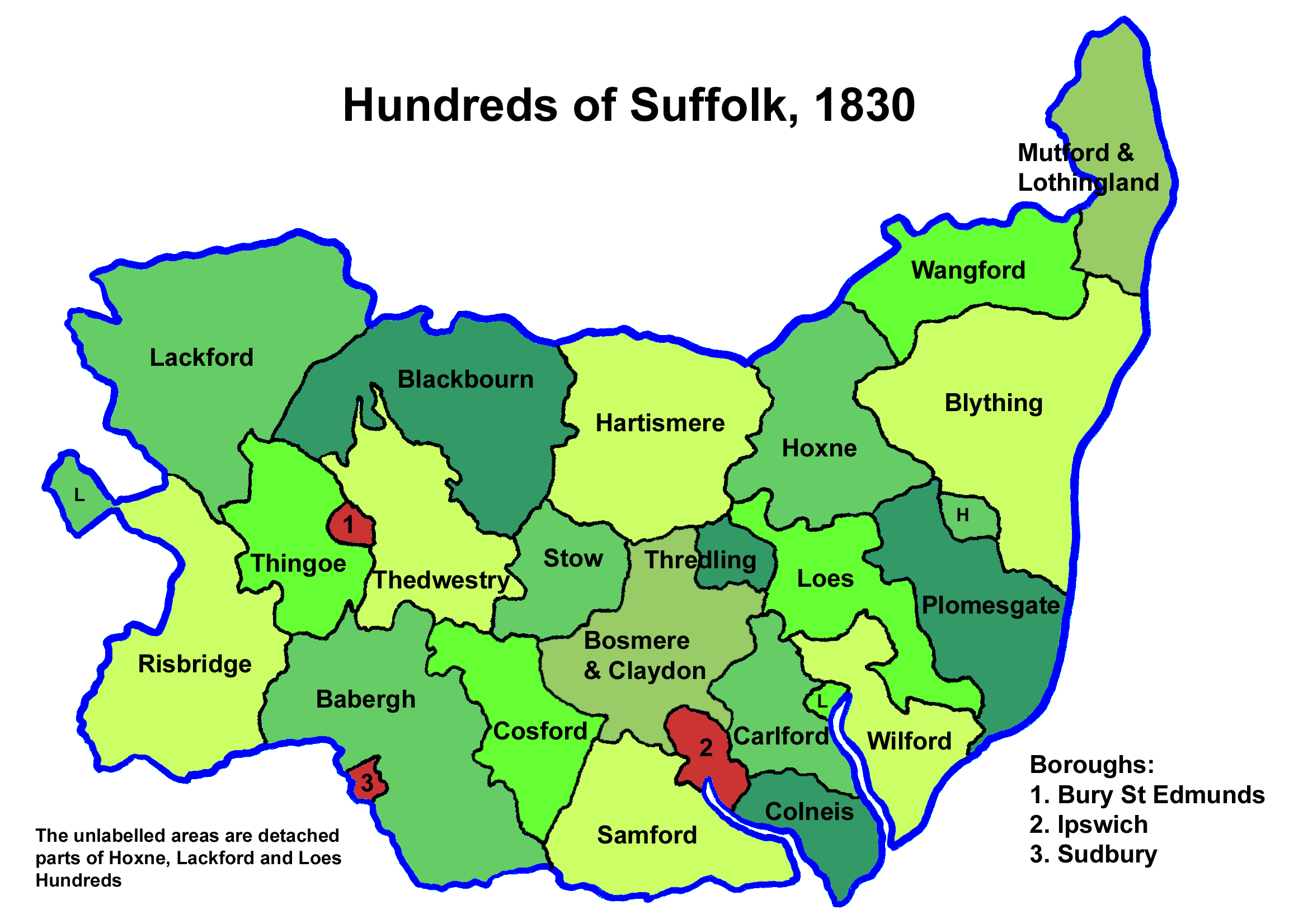
Suffolk hundreds

Thedwastre was made up of 24 parishes:

Parish	Area (acres)
Ampton	870
Beyton	626
Bradfield Combust	800
Bradfield St Clare	1428
Bradfield St George	2000
Drinkstone	2170
Felsham	1605
Fornham St Genevieve	700
Fornham St Martin	1200
Gedding	502
Great Barton	3500
Great Welnetham	1409
Hessett	1568
Little Welnetham	570
Livermere Magna	1580
Pakenham	3696
Rattlesden	3200
Rougham	3846
Rushbrooke	1066
Stanningfield	1431
Thurston	2400
Timworth	1220
Tostock	975
Woolpit	2000

== See also ==
- Thedwastre Rural District
