= Norton Wood =

Biosphere reserve in Suffolk, England

Coordinates: 52.243°N 0.886°E

- Site of Special Scientific Interest
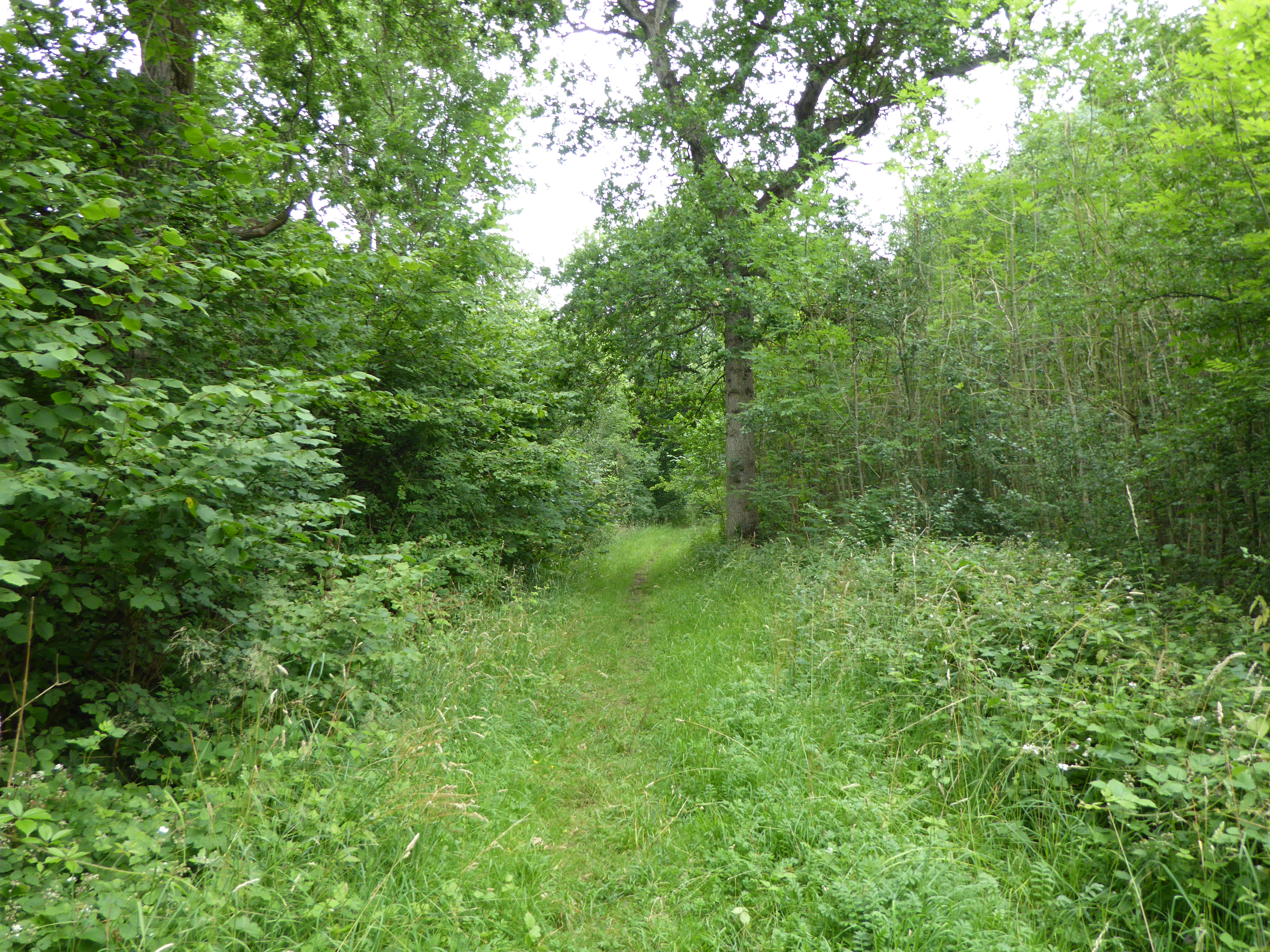
- Location of Norton Wood.
- Area of search: Suffolk
- Grid reference: TL 971 645
- Interest: Biological
- Area: 24.8 hectares
- Notification date: 1986
- Location map: Magic Map

Norton Wood is a 24.8-hectare (61-acre) biological Site of Special Scientific Interest south-east of Norton in Suffolk, England.

This ancient coppice with standards wood is on sand and loess over boulder clay. There are many pedunculate oak, hazel, ash and birch trees. The ground flora includes a number of uncommon plants such as oxlip.

There is access by a public footpath which goes through the wood.
