= This Is Colour =

UK power groove band

This Is Colour are an English progressive power groove band from Suffolk, England. They are currently unsigned but have a previous release, No Brainer, through Thirty Days of Night Records.

== History ==
=== Formation (2005) ===
This Is Colour formed in the summer of 2005, out of previous projects from the original members, Tom Cronin, Luke Truman, Keir Atkinson, Nicholas Cheshire and Elliot Bowes Shaves. They played their first show on 17 October 2005 at Zest in Ipswich, Suffolk, UK. Their now current vocalist, Dean Ceconi, bass player Jon Mcginn and drummer, Sean Griffin all attended this show.

=== Early years (2005–2008) ===
This Is Colour recorded their first demo First Steps (2005 demo) at West Suffolk College, Bury St Edmunds, Suffolk, this recording was never physically released and only three of the tracks made it to the band's Myspace page (This Is Colour's main outlet for publicity at the time). The demo has since leaked, but even with intense Google searching, it is still hard to come by. Their first actual release, A Brief Demonstration, recorded in Jason Naylor's shed, Glemsford, Suffolk, UK, was released in 2007. A Brief Demonstration grabbed the attention of promoters all over the UK, This Is Colour toured extensively, playing with the likes of Taking Back Sunday, Underoath, The Black Dahlia Murder, Your Demise and Architects. A Brief Demonstration also caught the attention of Thirty Days of Night Records, who later released This Is Colour's first studio album, No Brainer in 2009.

=== No Brainer and Beyond (2009–present) ===
No Brainer was recorded in the summer of 2008 by Neema Askari at Studio 33 near Spalding, Lincolnshire, UK. Released in the spring of 2009, No Brainer was not a notable success for the band, the slack production let their sound down and the delayed release stunted the initial excitement raised by the forever extending publicity. Despite all of this, the band went on to tour the album and remained a popular live heavy music act all over the UK and began to tour Europe, they shined particularly in Leeds and London. Following the release of No Brainer, This Is Colour released two singles, Make The Most (Recorded and produced by Keir Atkinson, Little Massingham, Norfolk, 2010) and Exhausting The Resource (Recorded and produced by Keir Atkinson, LP, Bury St Edmunds, Suffolk, 2011), for which This Is Colour created their first music video, directed and edited by their guitarist Tom Cronin, with the help of photographer Jordan Green.

== 'Stay Rad' and merchandise ==
This Is Colour's extensive merchandise included the popular line of 'Stay Rad' t-shirts and vests. This phrase inspired a whole array of rip offs and alternative uses. This Is Colour did not invent the phrase, but they were the first to print it.

== Band members ==
=== Current line-up ===
- Dean Ceconi – Vocals
- Keir Atkinson – Lead Guitar
- Tom Cronin – Rhythm Guitar
- Jon McGinn – Bass
- Sean Griffin – Drums

=== Former members ===
- Elliot Bowes Shaves – Vocals
- Luke Truman – Bass
- Nicholas Cheshire – Drums

== Discography ==
=== Studio albums ===
Title	Album details
No Brainer	Released: 2009; Label: Thirty Days of Night Records; Format: CD, Digital Download

=== Demos and EPs ===
- First Steps (2005 Demo) (Demo, 2005)
- A Brief Demonstration (Demo, 2007)
