= Felixstowe College =

Coordinates: 51.965°N 1.368°E

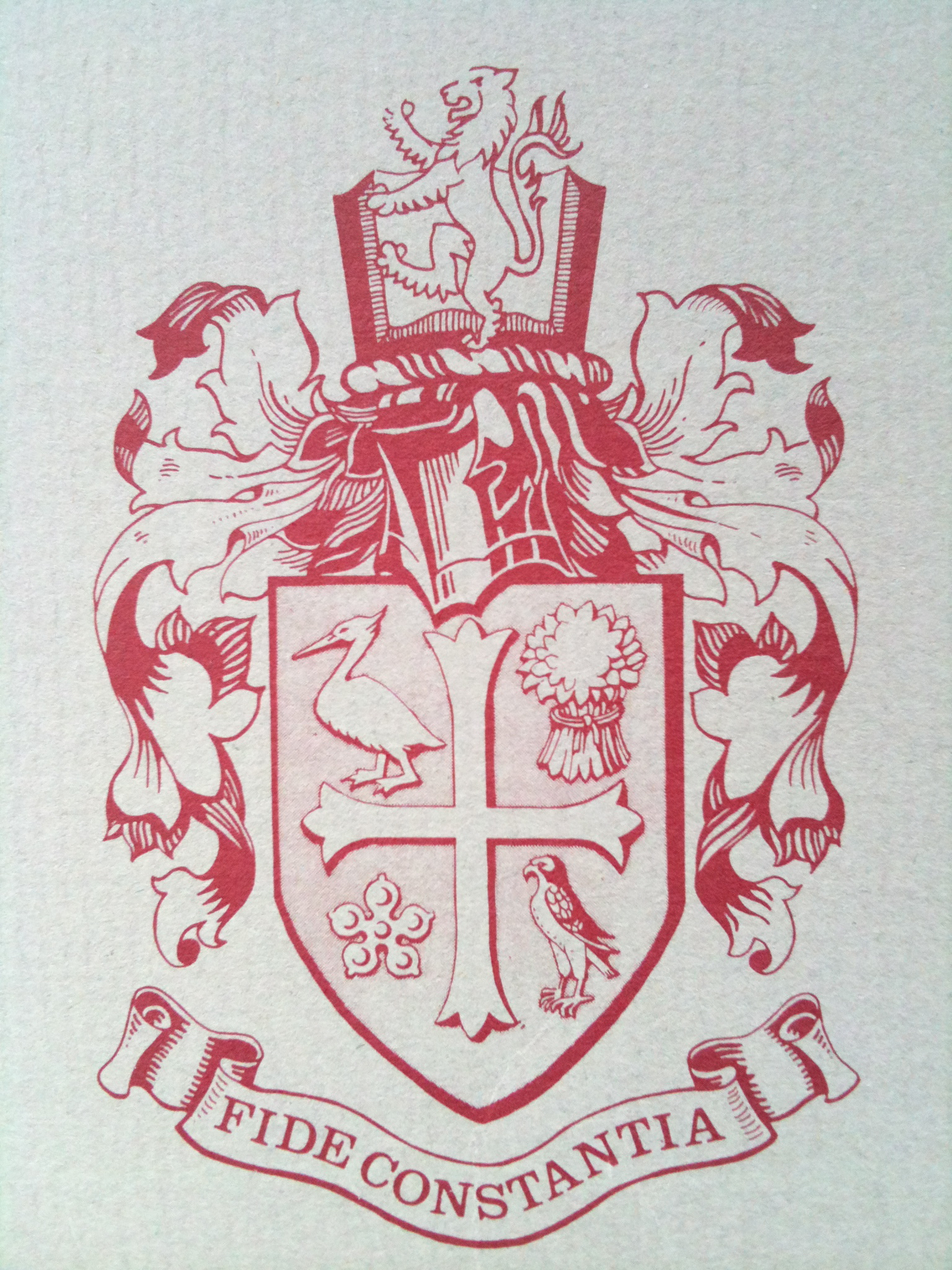

Location
- Maybush Lane; Felixstowe, Suffolk, IP11 7NQ; United Kingdom

Information
- Type: Independent school Boarding and day
- Motto: "Fide Constantia" (Latin for Constant in Faith)
- Established: 1929
- Closed: 1994
- Gender: Girls
- Age: 11 to 18
- Houses: See the Houses section
- Colours: Red, Grey

Felixstowe College was a girls' independent school, located in Felixstowe, Suffolk, England. It was established in 1929 and closed in 1994. In 1995, a different school called Felixstowe International College was founded on part of the site of Felixstowe College. Other former boarding houses, playing fields and the main school site were sold off for private housing. Julie Welch's memoir Too Marvellous for Words covers her time spent at this school in the 1960s.

== History ==
The school's original name was Uplands School. It became Felixstowe Ladies' College in January 1929. In the 1930s, the name changed to Felixstowe College for Girls, and then to Felixstowe College.

== Houses ==
The main boarding houses were Cranmer, Latimer, Ridley and Tyndale. Wycliffe was the first year house (Lower IV). Sixth form accommodation was located in Old Hooper, Coverdale and the Sixth Form Centre.

== Year groups ==
English school year	Felixstowe College year
Year 7	Lower Fourth (LIV)
Year 8	Upper Fourth (UIV)
Year 9	Lower Fifth (LV)
Year 10	Middle Fifth (MV)
Year 11	Upper Fifth (UV)
Year 12	Lower Sixth (LVI)
Year 13	Upper Sixth (UVI)

== Headmistresses ==
Miss M. E. Clarke 1929-1943
Miss Ruth Jones ("Jonah") 1943-1967
Miss Elizabeth Manners ("Maude") 1967-1979
Miss Dawn Guinness 1979-1988
Mrs Angela Lynas (Acting Headmistress) Autumn Term 1988
Mrs Ann Woodings 1989-1993
Mrs Bridget Patterson 1993-1994

== Map of the site in 1979 ==
Note: the location of Latimer House changed in 1982.
