= Listed buildings in Capel St Mary =

Civil Parish in Suffolk, England

Capel St Mary is a village and civil parish in the Babergh District of Suffolk, England. It contains 23 listed buildings that are recorded in the National Heritage List for England. Of these two are grade II* and 21 are grade II.

This list is based on the information retrieved online from Historic England.

== Key ==
Grade	Criteria
I	Buildings that are of exceptional interest
II*	Particularly important buildings of more than special interest
II	Buildings that are of special interest

== Listing ==
Name	Grade	Location	Type	Completed (Note: The date given is the date used by Historic England as significant for the initial building or that of an important part in the structure's description.)	Date designated	Grid ref. (Note: The grid reference is based on the British national grid reference system, sometimes known as OSGB36, used by the Ordnance Survey.) Geo-coordinates	Notes	Entry number (Note: The "List Entry Number" is a unique number assigned to each listed building and scheduled monument by Historic England.)	Image	Wikidata
Bluegate Farmhouse	II	Bluegate Lane, Capel St. Mary			23 August 1990	TM0949337174; 51°59′37″N 1°03′00″E		1194328	Upload Photo	Q26488953
Barn Approximately 30 Metres South West of Jermyns Farmhouse	II	Days Road, Capel St. Mary			17 January 1986	TM0871239120; 52°00′40″N 1°02′23″E		1033434	Upload Photo	Q26284915
Jermyns Farmhouse	II	Days Road, Capel St. Mary			27 April 1989	TM0873139132; 52°00′41″N 1°02′24″E		1285740	Upload Photo	Q26574404
Ladysmead	II	Days Road, Capel St. Mary			30 October 1990	TM0871038447; 52°00′19″N 1°02′22″E		1033435	Upload Photo	Q26284916
Old Hadleigh	II	London Road, Capel St. Mary			30 October 1990	TM0990138362; 52°00′14″N 1°03′24″E		1033436	Upload Photo	Q26284917
Keepers Cottage, Mill Hill, Capel St Mary	II	Mill Hill, IP9 2JD, Capel St. Mary			26 January 2021	TM0807338090; 52°00′08″N 1°01′48″E		1473644	Upload Photo	Q105197562
Bush Farmhouse	II	Old Lond Road, Capel St. Mary			30 October 1990	TM0917637427; 51°59′45″N 1°02′44″E		1351949	Upload Photo	Q26635011
Boynton Hall	II*	Old London Road, Capel St. Mary			16 March 1972	TM0917037231; 51°59′39″N 1°02′43″E		1033394	Upload Photo	Q17532630
Hillberry Cottage	II	Old London Road, Capel St. Mary			30 October 1990	TM0898937204; 51°59′38″N 1°02′34″E		1351950	Upload Photo	Q26635012
Little Owls the Thatched Cottage	II	Old London Road, Capel St. Mary			20 October 1990	TM0893437196; 51°59′38″N 1°02′31″E		1033395	Upload Photo	Q26284877
Manor House	II	Old London Road, Capel St. Mary			30 October 1990	TM0860337152; 51°59′37″N 1°02′13″E		1033396	Upload Photo	Q26284878
Pump Adjacent to Rear of Manor House	II	Old London Road, Capel St. Mary			30 October 1990	TM0862337148; 51°59′37″N 1°02′14″E		1351951	Upload Photo	Q26635013
Spring Hill	II	Pound Lane, Capel St. Mary			22 February 1955	TM0839037933; 52°00′03″N 1°02′04″E		1033397	Upload Photo	Q26284879
Capel Grove	II	Red Lane, Capel St. Mary			30 October 1990	TM0902837853; 51°59′59″N 1°02′37″E		1351952	Upload Photo	Q26635014
Stable/granary Approximately 50 Metres South East of Capel Grove	II	Red Lane, Capel St. Mary			30 October 1990	TM0906537807; 51°59′58″N 1°02′39″E		1033398	Upload Photo	Q26284880
White Horse Inn	II	The Old Street, Capel St. Mary	inn		30 October 1990	TM0984038183; 52°00′09″N 1°03′20″E		1351953	White Horse Inn More images	Q26635015
Orchard Cottage	II	5, The Street, Capel St. Mary			30 October 1990	TM0968938256; 52°00′11″N 1°03′13″E		1033401	Upload Photo	Q26284883
Olivers Cottage	II	101, The Street, Capel St. Mary			30 October 1990	TM0867738220; 52°00′11″N 1°02′20″E		1194481	Upload Photo	Q26489106
130, the Street	II	130, The Street, Capel St. Mary			30 October 1990	TM0864438244; 52°00′12″N 1°02′18″E		1033400	Upload Photo	Q26284882
Appletree Cottage Jubilee Cottage	II	The Street, Capel St. Mary			22 February 1955	TM0857138196; 52°00′11″N 1°02′14″E		1351954	Upload Photo	Q26635016
Church Cottage	II	The Street, Capel St. Mary			22 February 1955	TM0852638222; 52°00′12″N 1°02′12″E		1033399	Upload Photo	Q26284881
Church of St Mary	II*	The Street, Capel St. Mary	church building		22 February 1955	TM0858338242; 52°00′12″N 1°02′15″E		1285712	Church of St Mary More images	Q17534196
St Mary's Cottage	II	The Street, Capel St. Mary			30 October 1990	TM0872538283; 52°00′13″N 1°02′22″E		1285679	Upload Photo	Q26574350

== See also ==
- Grade I listed buildings in Suffolk
- Grade II* listed buildings in Suffolk

== Sources ==
- Bettely, James; Pevsner, Nikolaus (2015) [1961], Suffolk: West, The Buildings of England, New Haven and London: Yale University Press, ISBN 978-0-300-19655-9
