= Walter Pettit Tricker =

New Zealand farmer and soldier

Walter Pettit Tricker (1823–1907) was a New Zealand farmer, soldier and victim of injustice. He was born in Stowupland, Suffolk, England in about 1823.
