= Norton, Suffolk =

Village in Suffolk, England

Coordinates: 52.25°N 0.867°E

Norton
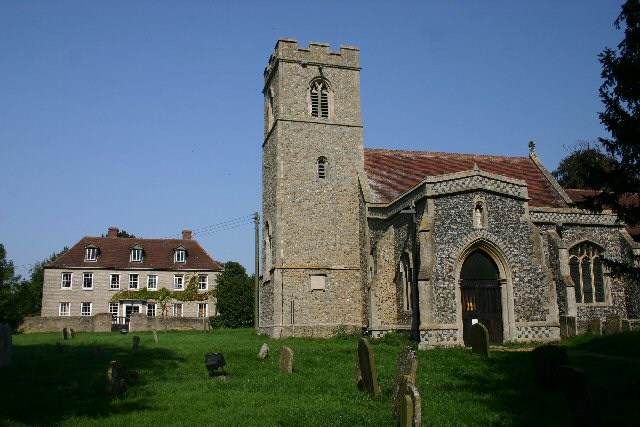
- Norton Church and Rectory

- Location within Suffolk
- Population: 1,003 (2011)
- District: Mid Suffolk
- Shire county: Suffolk
- Region: East
- Country: England
- Sovereign state: United Kingdom
- Post town: Bury St Edmunds
- Postcode district: IP31
- Dialling code: 01359
- Police: Suffolk
- Fire: Suffolk
- Ambulance: East of England
- UK Parliament: Bury St Edmunds and Stowmarket

Norton is a village and civil parish in the Mid Suffolk district of the English county of Suffolk. The name Norton means northern town or farm. Located close to the A14, its nearest railway station is at Elmswell, just over 3 miles (5 km) away. The closest towns are Stowmarket 8 miles (13 km) away and Bury St Edmunds, around 10 miles (16 km) away.

== History ==
The village once formed part of Blackbourn Hundred, which appears in the Domesday Book. Its agricultural past is reflected in the number of listed buildings in the village today that are former barns, stables and cartlodges. An 1870s gazetteer of Britain describes the parish as comprising 2,449 acres and having a population of 948. It also mentions it as a meet for the Suffolk fox hounds.

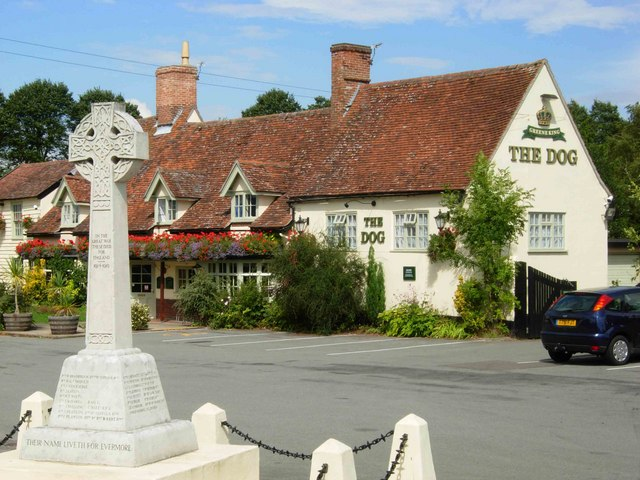
View to Norton pub

== The village today ==
Today the village has a population of around 800. Community facilities include a Greene King pub called "The Norton Dog" A mobile Post Office is located next to the village hall every weekday afternoon.

Norton has a pre-school next to the village hall and a Church of England voluntary primary school, with children generally moving on to middle school in the nearby communities of Ixworth and Beyton. Secondary education is provided at Thurston Community College.

The community is served by three churches, with a Baptist church and Salvation Army citadel on Woolpit Road. The Medieval Church of St Andrew at Norton, located some way from the centre of the village, contains a collection of eight 14th-century misericords and is believed to stand on the site of a Saxon church.

Norton is served with a bus service to Bury St Edmunds and Stowmarket which operates on a daily basis.

== Little Haugh Hall ==
Near the village is Little Haugh Hall, a Grade II* listed building. In the 18th century it was the home of the antiquarian Cox Macro.
