= Tostock =

Village in Suffolk, England

Coordinates: 52.235°N 0.862°E

- Location within Suffolk
- Population: 472 (2011)
- District: Mid Suffolk
- Shire county: Suffolk
- Region: East
- Country: England
- Sovereign state: United Kingdom
- Post town: BURY ST EDMUNDS
- Postcode district: IP30
- Dialling code: 01359

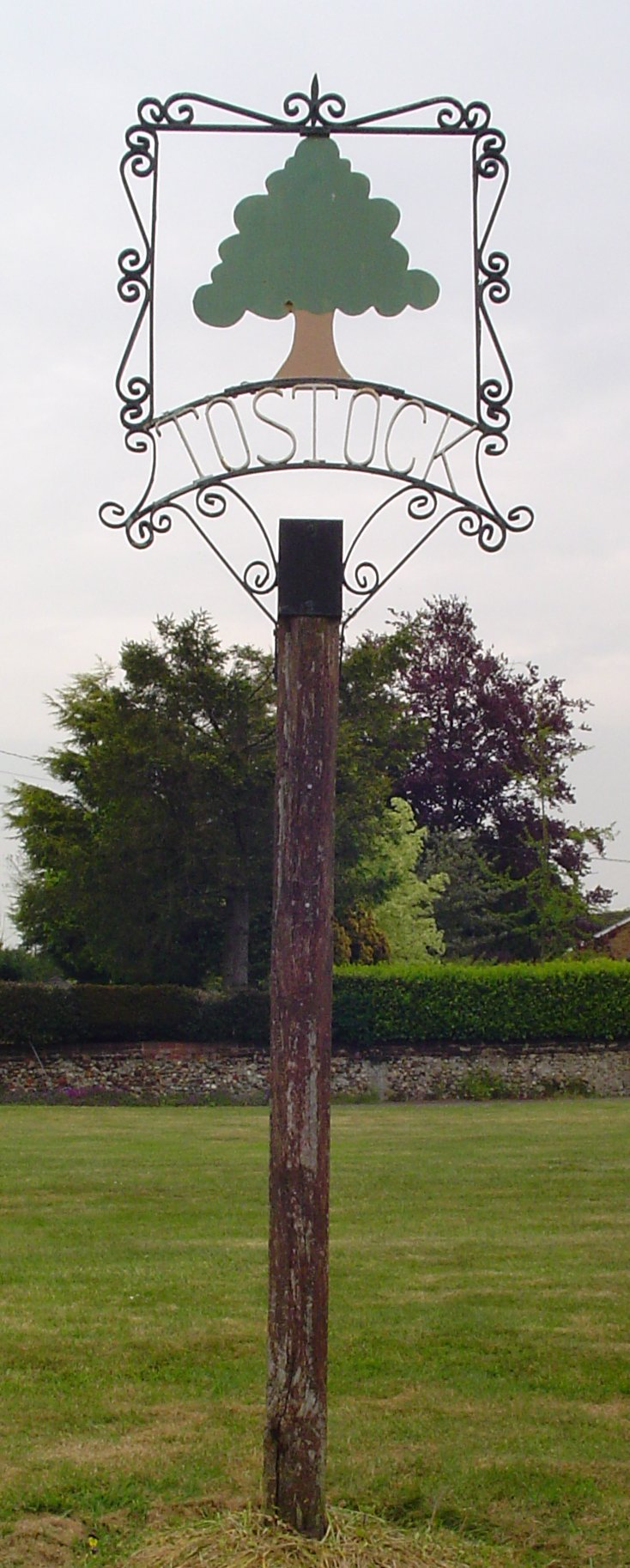
Signpost in Tostock

Tostock is a small village around eight miles east of Bury St. Edmunds in the county of Suffolk. It is a very traditional Suffolk village, with a good example of a fourteenth-century church.

As of 2011, the village is host to 198 houses with 472 residents.

== Layout ==
The village's houses are primarily located around two greens, The Green, forming the centre of the village and The Leys, to the south side of the village and home to the village pond.

== Church ==
The Parish Church of St. Andrew is Grade I listed. There was a church in Tostock mentioned in the Domesday survey of 1086 but the present building is believed to date from the 12th century. The tower was constructed in stages from about 1350. It is believed that the tower was completed in the 1460s as the oldest of its four bells dates from that time.

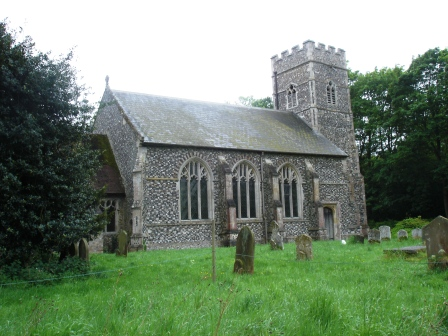
St Andrew's Church, Tostock, Suffolk, May 2007

== Village pub ==
The Gardener's Arms public house stands next to the village green alongside the chestnut tree that was planted in 1935 to commemorate the silver jubilee of King George V.

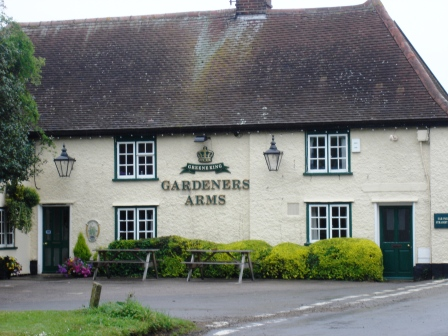
The Gardeners Arms, Tostock, Suffolk, May 2007

== Village school ==
Tostock's Victorian school building was opened in 1874 and closed in 1945. Today, most children attend either Norton CEVC Primary School or Woolpit Primary School, or Thurston Community College.
