= Beyton =

Village in Suffolk, England

Coordinates: 52.233°N 0.833°E

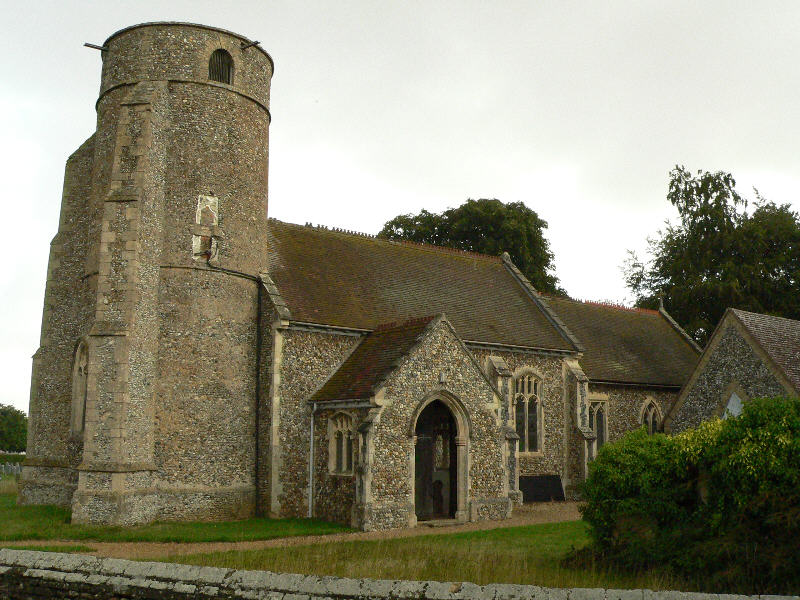
- All Saints’ Church, Beyton

- Location within Suffolk
- Interactive map of Beyton
- Population: 713 (2011 census)
- District: Mid Suffolk
- Shire county: Suffolk
- Region: East
- Country: England
- Sovereign state: United Kingdom
- Post town: Bury St Edmunds
- Postcode district: IP30

Beyton is a village and civil parish in the Mid Suffolk district of the English county of Suffolk. The village is around 8 miles (13 km) east of Bury St Edmunds, 2 miles (3.2 km) south-east of Thurston and 8 miles (13 km) north-west of Stowmarket. The main Ipswich to Bury St Edmunds road used to pass through the village – the modern A14 dual carriageway bypasses the village to the north.

== History ==
According to Eilert Ekwall the meaning of the name is homestead by brook or Beaga's homestead. The village is mentioned in the Domesday Book of 1086 as Begoton or Begatona. The Domesday village was held by Hugh de Montfort and was a very small settlement with a taxable value of just 0.3 geld units.

The village was a farming community located on the glacial clay of 'High' Suffolk. It grew up around the village green and the along the main Ipswich to Bury St Edmunds road. The road was turnpiked in 1711 and became an accident 'black spot' in modern times. The village having been bypassed in 1978 with the modern A14 running to the north of the village. A maltings was present in the village in 1855 and a post mill, which had originally been located at Wickhambrook, was moved to the village in 1830. A conservation area was established in the village in 1973.

Beyton Parish Council made both local and national news in 2015 after the chairman's wife blocked a member of the public legally filming a council meeting. The police were called to the scene.

== Governance ==
Beyton parish forms part of the Mid Suffolk district.

== All Saints’ Church ==
The parish church, All Saints, is a Grade II* listed building. It is one of 38 existing round-tower churches in Suffolk. The church tower is believed to be Saxon in origin, although the present tower has been dated to the 13th century. The building was heavily restored in the 19th century. The church is not mentioned in the Domesday Book entry for the village.

== Education ==
Beyton Middle School enrolled about 700 pupils from age 9 to 13 with the majority of students coming from surrounding villages. The school closed in July 2014 as part of a reorganisation of schools to a two tier structure by Suffolk County Council that saw students stay in primary school to age 11 where they would then transfer on to secondary schools, mostly Thurston Community College, Stowupland High School or Bury St Edmunds County High School. The site is now used by Thurston Community College as part of its sixth form provision.

== Notable people ==
- Robert Dewing (1863–1934), cricketer and army officer
