= East Bergholt High School =

Location
- Heath Road; East Bergholt; Colchester, Essex, CO7 6RJ; England
- Coordinates: 51.97851°N 1.02662°E

Information
- Type: Academy
- Local authority: Suffolk
- Specialist: Science; Applied Learning (secondary)
- Department for Education URN: 137218 Tables
- Head teacher: Dan Woodcock
- Gender: Coeducational
- Age: 11 to 16
- Enrolment: 931
- Website: http://www.ebhigh.org.uk

East Bergholt High School is a secondary school in East Bergholt, Suffolk, 11 miles (18 km) north of Colchester, Essex, and nine miles (14 km) south of Ipswich, Suffolk. It has 931 students. The current headteacher is Dan Woodcock.

In 2018, the school was awarded a 'good school' Ofsted inspection rating.

== History ==
The school opened on its present site in 1956 as East Bergholt Modern School. It replaced a Victorian-built school at Burnt Oak, East Bergholt, at the junction of Flatford Road and White Horse Road.

East Bergholt Modern School took children aged 11–16 from East Bergholt and surrounding villages, including Brantham, Bentley, Capel St Mary, Copdock, Washbrook, Raydon and Holton St Mary. Many of these villages had their own primary schools. These children would have not passed the 11+ examination or chose not to attend a higher school after passing it. The school's focus at the time was on technical rather than academic ability, with a leaning towards rural and domestic science.

The original school building, which is still in use, has a hall, library, kitchens and about ten classrooms. Originally, two of these were specially equipped for cookery/needlework and science/rural science.

A second building opened in 1971, with a ceremony performed by Margaret Thatcher, then education minister. This building was largely open-plan with the exception of the music and art/craft rooms. A new science section on the northern side of the first floor had three rooms, again open-plan. The school roll at the time was 350.

A sports hall opened at the same time. Between 1972 and 1979, a campaign led by villager Jan Watts led to an open-air heated swimming pool being built to the north of the sports hall. The sports hall was extended in 1997, and its facilities, including a fitness studio, gym, hard courts and grass pitches, are shared with the community.

The school has 20 acres (81,000 m^{2}) of grounds which included a youth club to the west of the original school and a caretaker's house on the frontage. The original tennis courts at the front of the school are now a car park, and new sports courts have been built on the east of the site.

In the late 1970s, the school became a comprehensive (taking children of all abilities) and changed its name from "modern school" to "high school". It became a specialist science college in 2004, and was designated a high-performing specialist school in 2009.

As of 2010, its catchment area remains the same as it was in the 1950s, although the school's reputation for academic achievement has led to children from north Colchester and Manningtree choosing to go there. Also as of 2010 the school has consisted of four blocks as the swimming pool was filled in and was turned into an extra playground and "D block".

The school's original building is called "A block" and consists of the hall, canteen, 18 classrooms one containing kitchen facilities, music practice rooms and small offices. The second block to be built was "B block". It consists of a library, the school's office, 13 classrooms including science labs and ICT suits."C block" has 12 classrooms including science labs ICT suites and technology rooms. The newest "D block" has 3 classrooms and small examination room used for language GCSE speaking exams.

During 2013 work began on the extension of the original dining hall which has made extra room for eating areas. In 2017 A Block was extended with an extra multi-use space which can be divided into two rooms. Solar panels have also been put on top of B Block roof.

In 2023 the school was found to have potentially structurally unsound buildings due to the use of reinforced autoclaved aerated concrete as a building material.

== School badges ==
The school's first badge showed a lamb; this sought to maintain a connection with East Bergholt's first school, opened in 1594 by the lawyer Edward Lambe, and intended "for the instruction of poor boys". The Lambe School building still stands in The Street, and is used as a community hall. The current badge is a "Blue Wave" of three blue stripes.

== People of note ==
Zoe Newson, student of 2008, is a British powerlifter who in 2012 posted a European record at the IPC Powerlifting British Championships. She took bronze in the under-40 kg class for Great Britain at the 2012 Summer Paralympics in London.

== Notability ==
In June 2018, 4 Year 10 Students designed mural boards designed to protect the new war memorial built in Capel St Mary to mark the 100th anniversary of the World War One. The boards have been commended by the current South Suffolk MP, James Cartlidge and were officially removed on 11 November 2018 to reveal the memorial. During 2018, RAF reserve Group Captain, Gary Bunkell sent a letter regarding the project to the Queen and received a response praising the students of the school for their commitments to the project.

== See also ==
- List of schools in Suffolk
