= Samuel Ward Academy =

Coordinates: 52.0892°N 0.4473°E

Location
- Chalkstone Way; Haverhill, Suffolk, CB9 0LD; England

Information
- Type: Academy
- Motto: "The best way to predict the future is to create it"
- Founder: P.cell
- Department for Education URN: 136322 Tables
- Ofsted: Reports
- Headmaster: Tom Johnston
- Gender: Coeducational
- Age: 11 to 18
- Houses: Brunel, Cavell, Darwin
- Colours: Navy, Teal and Red
- Publication: The Word (quarterly)
- Website: http://www.samuelward.co.uk/

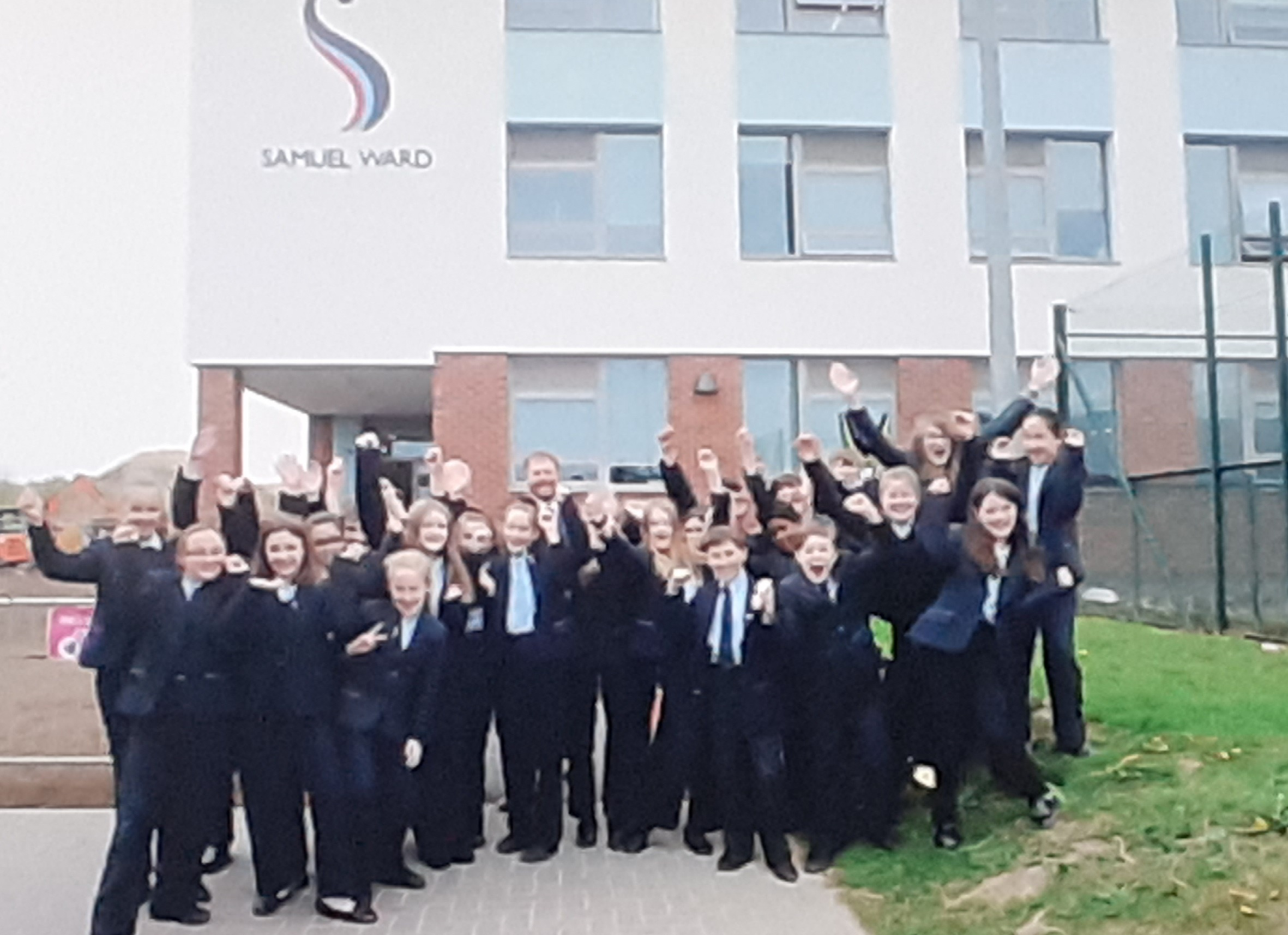
Samuel Ward Academy's B Block, with a few students and the headteacher standing in front.

Samuel Ward Academy (formerly Samuel Ward Arts and Technology College) is a coeducational secondary school and sixth form located in Haverhill in the English county of Suffolk.

The school is named after Puritan lecturer Samuel Ward, the son of Haverhill minister John Ward. Ward was elected as Town Preacher at St. Mary-le-Tower (now Ipswich Minster), serving for approximately 30 years.

== See also ==
- List of schools in Suffolk
