= Claydon High School =

Location
- Church Lane; Claydon, Suffolk, IP6 0EG; England
- Coordinates: 52°06′23″N 1°06′55″E

Information
- Type: Academy
- Motto: Be the best you can be
- Local authority: Suffolk
- Department for Education URN: 144214 Tables
- Ofsted: Reports
- Chair of Governors: Stephen Carr
- Headteacher: Mark Ismay
- Staff: 101
- Gender: Coeducational
- Age: 11 to 16
- Enrollment: 775
- Colours: Red, Black
- Website: www.claydonhigh.co.uk

Claydon High School is a relatively small mixed secondary school in Claydon, Suffolk, England. The school is on the outskirts of Ipswich, just off the A14 and close to the A12 southbound. It shared a joint sixth form with Thurleston High School until July 2010, when their sixth form closed.

On 1 June 2017, Claydon High School joined the South Suffolk Learning Trust, a multi-academy trust.

== History ==
On 1 June, Claydon High School converted to an academy when it joined the South Suffolk Learning Trust.

Following the end of 2016/2017 academic year, headmistress Sarah Skinner announced that she would take the position of Chief Executive at the newly formed South Suffolk Learning Trust from September–March as a secondment while remaining as 'Executive Headteacher' during this time.

== Academic performance ==
Ofsted (September 2021) judged the school to be "good" in addition to students being praised for their good behaviour.

The strengths of the school include a strong and effective safeguarding culture, high expectations for how students behave and a well-considered curriculum where teachers with strong subject knowledge teach content which allows students to develop a depth of knowledge and understanding.

== Notable visitors ==
- Ex gold medalist Jamie Baulch visited the school on 19 October 2011 with the Jamie Baulch Academy.
- MP Dr Dan Poulter and councillor Chris Chambers visited Claydon High School to talk to members of CHS's school council in late October 2021. The MP and students discussed current affairs as well as asking questions on behalf of their peer groups.

== See also ==
- List of schools in Suffolk
