= Ashley School =

Location
- Ashley Downs; Lowestoft, Suffolk, NR32 4EU; England

Information
- Type: Special school; Academy
- Local authority: Suffolk County Council
- Department for Education URN: 137459 Tables
- Ofsted: Reports
- Gender: Co-educational
- Age: 7 to 16
- Website: www.ashleyschool.co.uk

The Ashley School, in Lowestoft, Suffolk, England is a special school for pupils with Moderate Learning Difficulties and complex needs. The school has been twice graded "outstanding" by OFSTED. It is considered a specialist school for Cognition and Learning.

== Background ==
The Ashley School provides education for around 135 students with moderate/complex learning difficulties aged 7–16. The school offers housing options for 29 students from Monday through Thursday.

The school provides numerous therapeutic services for their pupils including a speech and language team.

== See also ==
- Adeyfield Academy
