= Stowupland =

Civil parish in Suffolk, England

Coordinates: 52.196°N 1.019°E

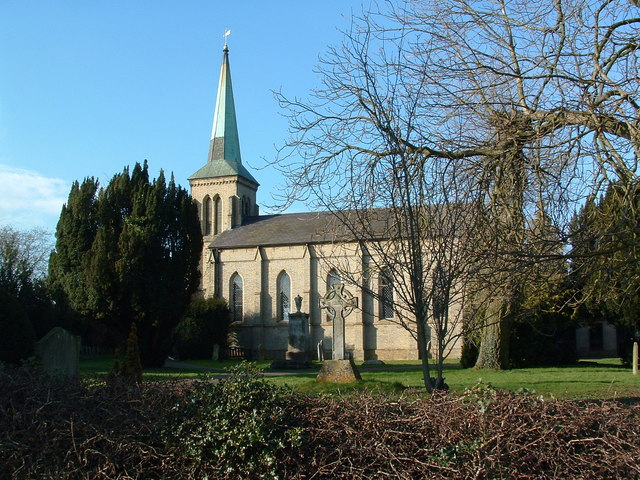
- Holy Trinity Church, Stowupland

- Location within Suffolk
- Population: 1,988 (2011)
- OS grid reference: TM064596
- District: Mid Suffolk
- Shire county: Suffolk
- Region: East
- Country: England
- Sovereign state: United Kingdom
- Post town: Stowmarket
- Postcode district: IP14
- Dialling code: 01449

Stowupland is a civil parish 1 mile (2 km) east of Stowmarket, Suffolk, England. Stowupland means "a place occupied on higher ground than Stowmarket", with the Saxons calling the village Ultuna due to the far higher presence of owls in the woods that previously stood on the site of Holy Trinity Church ('Ul' meaning owl). Stowupland High School is found in the village.

Stowupland is centred on several village greens and has numerous amenities including, a petrol station, a butchers, a Chinese takeaway, a chip shop and two public houses - The Crown and The Retreat. As well as the High School there is Freeman Community Primary School, which has an attached pre-school. There are active football, cricket and bowls clubs in the village. A lottery grant funded gym and indoor sports facility is available for public use at the high school.

The "Stowupland Neighbourhood Development Plan" was drawn up by the Parish Council and adopted in June 2019. The plan was produced following the completion and analysis of a questionnaire that was sent to every dwelling and allows residents to have a degree of say in what happens in the village. One of the main aims is to try to maintain Stowupland's separation from the nearby market town of Stowmarket which has expanded considerably in recent years with just a single field now separating properties in Stowmarket from Stowupland. A monthly magazine, "The Telstar", is delivered free to every household and contains reports from parish and local council as well as various articles from residents, clubs and churches in the village. Stowupland previously hosted an event (Music on The Green) which took place in June each year. Due to lack of interest (occasional bad weather) the event was discontinued.

The A1120 tourist route runs through the village and the A14 trunk road is located just to its south.

== Awards ==
- Best Kept Village 1984
- Best Kept Large Village 1986
- Suffolk Village of the Year 2006

== Notable residents ==
- Walter Pettit Tricker (1823–1907), farmer, soldier and victim of injustice who emigrated to New Zealand
- Neil Stacy (1941- ), actor
