= Hopton, Suffolk =

Village in Suffolk, England

Coordinates: 52.372°N 0.927°E

Hopton
- Location within Suffolk
- Population: 653 (2011)
- District: West Suffolk
- Shire county: Suffolk
- Region: East
- Country: England
- Sovereign state: United Kingdom
- Post town: DISS
- Postcode district: IP22
- Police: Suffolk
- Fire: Suffolk
- Ambulance: East of England
- UK Parliament: West Suffolk

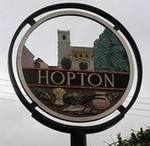
Hopton Village Sign

Hopton is a village and civil parish in the West Suffolk district of Suffolk in eastern England. Located just south of the Norfolk border on the B1111 road between Stanton and Garboldisham, in 2011 it had a population of 653. It shares a parish council with neighbouring Knettishall.

All Saints' Church is at the geographical centre of the village, it has regular services and is part of the United Benefice of Stanton, Hopton, Market Weston, Barningham & Coney Weston.

== Schools ==
There is a primary school, and a pre-school. The primary school feeds students both to Thurston Community College in Thurston and Ixworth Free School in Ixworth.
