= Newmarket Academy =

Location
- Exning Road; Newmarket, Suffolk, CB8 0EB; England
- Coordinates: 52.25021°N 0.39635°E

Information
- Type: Academy
- Department for Education URN: 140669 Tables
- Ofsted: Reports
- Head of School: Martin Witter
- Gender: Coeducational
- Age: 11 to 16
- Website: http://www.ncol.uk.com/

Newmarket Academy (formerly Newmarket College) is a coeducational secondary school with academy status located in Newmarket in the English county of Suffolk.

Previously a community school administered by Suffolk County Council, Newmarket College converted to academy status on 1 July 2014 and was renamed Newmarket Academy and became part of the Samuel Ward Academy Trust. However, the school continues to coordinate with Suffolk County Council for admissions.

Newmarket Academy offers GCSE courses, and has cross-curricular study and extra-curricular activities. In the academic year 2014–2015 GCSE results at the newly created Academy rose 15% to 52% A* - C including English and Maths. The school is also partnered with Godolphin to offer experience to the students.

== See also ==
- List of schools in Suffolk
