= Felixstowe International College =

Location
- Maybush Lane; Felixstowe, Suffolk, IP11 7NA; England; 51.96827°N 1.36695°E

Information
- Type: Other Independent School
- Religious affiliation: Church of England
- Established: 1995
- Local authority: Suffolk
- Department for Education URN: 124899 Tables
- Gender: Coeducational
- Age: 9 to 18
- Website: http://ficedu.org/

Felixstowe International College is a private school founded in 1995 in Felixstowe, Suffolk, England.

== See also ==
- List of schools in Suffolk
