= West Suffolk College =

Location
- Out Risbygate; Bury St Edmunds, Suffolk, IP33 3RL; England; 52°14′56″N 0°41′59″E

Information
- Type: Further Education, Higher Education & Apprenticeships
- Established: 1925
- Local authority: Suffolk
- Principal: Colin Shaw
- Gender: Coeducational
- Age: 14+
- Enrolment: 10,629
- Sixth form students: 3407
- 1,870 apprentices: Apprentices
- 247 students: University Centre
- 4976 students: Adult Learners
- Website: https://www.wsc.ac.uk

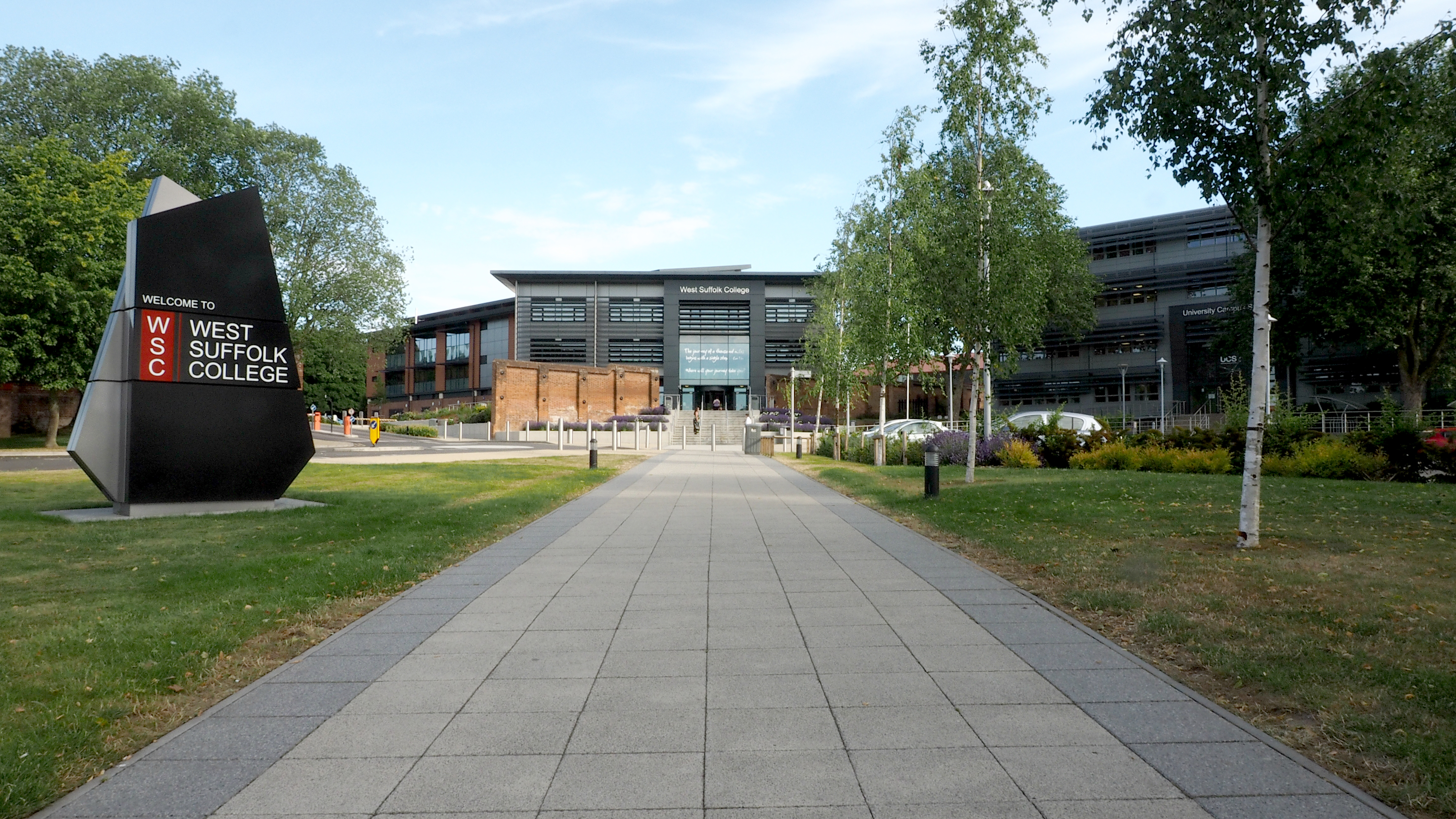
The Gateway at West Suffolk College, July 2015

West Suffolk College is a Further Education college in Bury St Edmunds, Suffolk. The college delivers a range of courses, including vocational and technical courses, apprenticeships, and an array of higher-apprenticeships and bachelor's degree courses accredited by the University of East Anglia. Over 14,170 learners are enrolled across Eastern Education Group, with around 10,629 of those at West Suffolk College.

== Campuses ==
The main campus site is the Gateway Building, situated on Out Risbygate in Bury St Edmunds. The Built Environment Campus or Milburn Centre is situated on Anglian Lane and the STEM Innovation Campus and University Studies Centre are situated on Western Way. Both are a short walk from the sixth form campus.

The college also has training centres in Haverhill, Thetford, Sudbury and Ipswich, with courses also being taught in towns and villages across Suffolk, including Clare, Pakenham, Thurston and Stowmarket.

== Early years as the 'Evening Institute' ==
A memoir by N.F. Watterson, the first principal, chronicles the history of West Suffolk College of Further Education. It traces the college's humble beginnings as a small evening institute in Bury St Edmunds in 1925, expanding to encompass day classes and a technical institute during World War II and beyond.

The West Suffolk College of Further Education had its roots in an "Evening Institute" established in 1925 in Bury St Edmunds. The town was much smaller then, and Mr. J.H. Wakefield held the positions of Town Clerk, Borough Treasurer, and Education Officer simultaneously.

Mr. Wakefield, seeking to establish evening classes, sought the expertise of the author, N.F. Watterson, who had experience from the Industrial Midlands.

Watterson suggested several subjects, such as English, Shorthand, Book-keeping, and Arithmetic, and the classes commenced with Watterson as a technical advisor.

For the next ten years, classes were held in various schools.

In 1935, the Ministry of Education consolidated these classes under a single head, appointing Watterson as Principal of the Evening Institute, in addition to his full-time work at the County School.

Watterson served as Principal, including during World War II, while simultaneously serving as a Scientific Advisor to the County Air Raid Precautions (A.R.P.) Authority.

The Evening Institute represents the foundation upon which the later Technical Institute, and eventually the West Suffolk College of Further Education, was built.

== Bury St Edmunds Technical Institute ==
In 1951, the Bury St Edmunds Technical Institute began offering Engineering, Building and vocational evening classes in the grounds of the Silver Jubilee School. In 1958, it decided to construct a new purpose built college on its own ground, at the Gibraltar Barracks site, where the West Suffolk College is today. It was officially opened on 29 May 1961.

stablished after World War II, the Technical Institute emerged from the "Evening Institute" that had been operating since 1925.

Challenges and Resourcefulness:

The Technical Institute faced significant challenges in its early years, most notably a lack of dedicated facilities. Classes were held in a variety of locations across Bury St Edmunds. The locations included:

- Premises behind the Bury Free Press.
- The Roundel Club Buildings.
- Huts at Gibraltar Barracks.
- A shed behind the "Rising Sun" in Risbygate Street.

Expansion and Recognition:

- Watterson emphasises the support received from individuals like Mr. Harvey Frost, F.I.O.B., whose advocacy for vocational training was instrumental in establishing classes for apprentices in the Building Industry.
- The institute also benefited from the guidance of Alderman E.W. Steward, who provided crucial support during the early years of Further Education programs in the region.

Transition to a New Era:

The recommendations of the Ministry of Education, coupled with the growing demand for further education, prompted the planning and construction of a new, dedicated building for the Technical Institute. This marked a significant step towards the establishment of the West Suffolk College of Further Education as it exists today. Although Watterson retired before the new building's completion, he acknowledged the contributions of key figures like Mr. A.T. Candler, Mr. J.E. Norris, and Mrs. K.G. Pugsley, who played essential roles in the institute's development and transition.

== 1970s to the modern day ==
In the 1970s and 1980s, the college expanded; from 1970 to 1977, the Engineering, Construction and Motor Vehicle training centres were built. In 1983, Australia House, a dedicated beauty, hair and hospitality school was opened. A year later, a purpose built facility for students with learning difficulties and disabilities was built. The expansion continued into the 1990s; with Gibraltar House opening in 1999.

In 2006, the college was awarded Grade 1: Outstanding by Ofsted and in 2011, Dr Ann Williams, the then Principal, was appointed an OBE for services to Further Education in the Queen's Birthday Honours list. She was replaced by Dr Nikos Savvas in 2013. In 2014, a new building, The Gateway, now the face of the college, was opened. The following year the college received confirmation of a £7m government grant to help pay for an £8m energy, engineering and manufacturing teaching centre. In September 2015, the college began Animal Care and Management courses at the Newmarket Academy. In 2016, the college was ranked in the top five per cent in the country for its achievement rates in Level 3 Vocational Diplomas, the best in the Eastern Region, and the second best GCSE English resit results in the country.

Former Chairs of Governors at the college have gone on to be awarded an MBE, including Elizabeth Milburn and Richard Carter. The current Chair of Governors at the college and Eastern Education Group Trust, Elton D'Souza is a National Leader of Governance.

The college offers a range of Apprenticeships and in 2016, it enrolled over 1,000 people onto its apprenticeships, with an achievement rate eight per cent higher than the national average at 78%.

Following an inspection under new grading criteria, the college was graded as 'Good' by Ofsted.

The college was named in July 2019 as a computing hub for the National Centre for Computing Education.

In 2020, the college became the first provider to have an Apprenticeship accredited by The Royal Society of Chemistry

In 2021, the college joined the National College for Nuclear (NCfN) as an Accredited Provider. It has also been acknowledged as the first college in the country to facilitate the teaching of black history all year round and has won prestigious industry accolades for outstanding and innovative careers leadership and practice.

== Recent awards and recognition across Eastern Education Group ==
=== 2006 ===
- Grade 1: “Outstanding” across all categories – West Suffolk College (full Ofsted inspection May 2006). files.ofsted.gov.uk
- Beacon Status – national mark of excellence from the Learning & Skills Council (acknowledged in Ofsted and subsequent reports). files.ofsted.gov.uk

=== 2008 – 2009 ===
- Training Quality Standard (TQS) – West Suffolk College accredited in seven vocational areas (initially awarded 2008; confirmed in 2010 Ofsted report). files.ofsted.gov.uk

=== 2010 ===
- Overall Ofsted grading: Good with “many Outstanding features” – West Suffolk College. files.ofsted.gov.uk

=== 2015 ===
- Ofsted: “Outstanding” – Suffolk One (now One Sixth Form College), full inspection 8 Jun 2015. reports.ofsted.gov.uk

=== 2016 ===
- With the support and assistance of the New Anglia LEP, West Suffolk College has acquired the freehold of the William Vinten Building in Western Way Bury St Edmunds in order to transform it into an Engineering and Innovation Centre which it hopes to open in September 2017. The college acquired the building in January 2016 and for the time being, Vitec Video com Ltd will continue in residence as a tenant of West Suffolk College whilst they relocate to alternative premises and the college prepares its detailed plans for the refurbishment of the site.

=== 2017 ===
- Winner – Best Teaching & Learning Initiative (TES FE Awards) – MARS cross-disciplinary project, West Suffolk College. tes.com

=== 2018 ===
- BTEC College of the Year – One Sixth Form College (Pearson BTEC Awards). pearson.com

=== 2019 ===
- AA College Rosette – Highly Commended – Edmunds Restaurant, West Suffolk College (first success). suffolknews.co.uk
- Silver – FE Lecturer of the Year (Pearson National Teaching Awards) – Nicola Manning, One Sixth Form College. teachingawards.com
- Abbeygate Sixth Form College opens.

=== 2021 ===
- Winner – AoC President's Award – Ellisha Soanes, West Suffolk College, for pioneering equality, diversity & inclusion work. suffolknews.co.uk
- Winner – Careers & Enterprise Company Award for Innovation in Careers & Enterprise (AoC Beacon Awards 2020/21) – West Suffolk College careers team. feweek.co.uk

=== 2022 ===
- Ofsted: “Outstanding” – One Sixth Form College (inspection 26 Apr 2022). reports.ofsted.gov.uk
- AA College Rosette – Highly Commended – Edmunds Restaurant, West Suffolk College (retained from 2019). suffolknews.co.uk

=== 2023 ===
- Ofsted: “Outstanding” (first full inspection) – Abbeygate Sixth Form College. reports.ofsted.gov.uk
- Highly Commended – Student Volunteer of the Year (Good for Me Good for FE Awards) – Mariia Yakymenko, Abbeygate Sixth Form College. suffolknews.co.uk
- HRH Princess Royal officially opens state of the art training centre opens in November 2023

=== 2024 ===
- Winner – Inspiring Learning Space of the Year (Education Estates Awards) – EEG's Extended Reality (XR) Lab. easterneducationgroup.ac.uk
- Winner – Business Leader of the Year (West Suffolk Business Awards) – Dr Nikos Savvas, CEO, Eastern Education Group. suffolknews.co.uk
- Highly Commended – Green / Environment Award (West Suffolk Business Awards) – Eastern Education Group / West Suffolk College. burybusinessawards.co.uk
- Ofsted: “Outstanding” (full inspection) – West Suffolk College, report published 18 Dec 2024. reports.ofsted.gov.uk | West Suffolk College graded ‘outstanding’ in exceptional Ofsted report – Eastern Education Group
- In June 2024, Dr Nikos Savvas, CEO of Eastern Education Group, is appointed Deputy Lieutenant for Suffolk after contributions to Suffolk's education sector
- SENDAT acquired as part of the Eastern Education Group and incorporated into the Group's SEND offering
- Haverhill Learning Centre opens its new Learning Centre, relocating from its old base on the site of a former school to Provincial House in the town's High Street

=== 2025 ===
- Exning Primary School joins Eastern Education Group
- Finalist – Sustainable Energy First Award for Education for Sustainable Development (AoC Beacon Awards 2024/25) – West Suffolk College. aoc.co.uk
- Highly Commended – AA College Rosette – Edmunds Restaurant, West Suffolk College (third consecutive recognition). easterneducationgroup.ac.uk

== Eastern Education Group Trust ==
The college is a sponsor of the Eastern Education Group Trust, a collaboration with One Sixth Form College in Ipswich and Abbeygate Sixth Form College in Bury St Edmunds. In 2016, the Trust was given permission by the Department for Education to build a new sixth form, Abbeygate, in Bury St Edmunds, which has been completed as of 2023, to cater for up to 1,700 pupils, offering more than 30 A-level courses to 16-19 year olds.

== Eastern Education Group ==
Originally known as Eastern Colleges Group, Eastern Education Group was formed in 2023 to reflect the expansion of our educational offering which spans from primary education through to adulthood. West Suffolk College, Abbeygate Sixth Form College in Bury St Edmunds and One Sixth Form College in Ipswich are collectively known as the Eastern Education Group. The Group is a collective of Primary, specialist SEND schools, and post-16 education providers.

== University Studies at West Suffolk College ==
University Studies at West Suffolk College was a founding member of the University of Suffolk, providing a range of apprenticeships and undergraduate degree courses. However, there was an end to the partnership between the two institutions planned from the academic year 2021–2022.

A wide range of Bachelor's degrees are now delivered in partnership with the University of East Anglia as well as a range of Higher National Qualifications.

== Principal and CEO ==
Dr Nikos Savvas has a doctorate in High Energy Particle Physics from Manchester University and has held senior roles in the further education sector for a number of years. He is a board member for various organisations including the New Anglia Local Enterprise Partnership's All Energy Industry Council, the New Anglia Local Enterprise Partnership's Skills Advisory Panel for Norfolk and Suffolk and the Special Educational Needs and Disabilities Trust (SENDAT). He took up the role of Principal and CEO at West Suffolk College in September 2013.

== Alumni ==
- Nick Pope - Footballer
- Toby Stuart - Hospitality Consultant to Albert Roux
- David Starie - Former Professional Boxer
- John-Henry Phillips - Author, archaeologist, filmmaker, and television presenter
- Tom Francis - Actor, Singer
