= Elmswell =

Village in Suffolk, England

Coordinates: 52.23724°N 0.91132°E

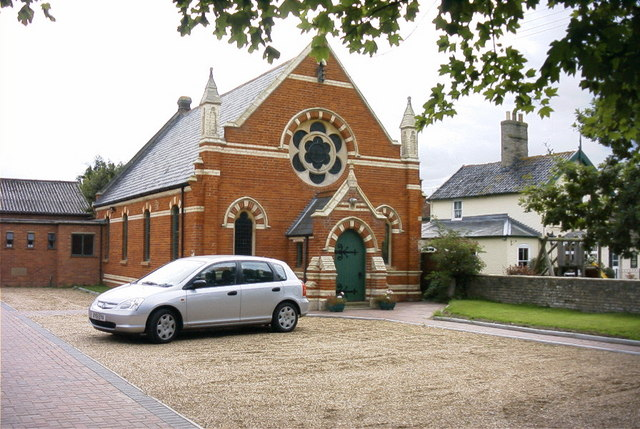
- Elmswell Methodist Church

- Location within Suffolk
- Population: 3,950 (2011)
- Civil parish: Elmswell
- District: Mid Suffolk
- Shire county: Suffolk
- Region: East
- Country: England
- Sovereign state: United Kingdom
- Post town: Bury St Edmunds
- Postcode district: IP30
- Dialling code: 01359
- Police: Suffolk
- Fire: Suffolk
- Ambulance: East of England
- UK Parliament: Bury St Edmunds and Stowmarket

Elmswell is a village and civil parish in the county of Suffolk, England. It is situated halfway between Bury St. Edmunds and Stowmarket and lies just to the north of the A14 road.

The history of the village can be traced as far back as the Roman times based on a site containing a pottery kiln dated around the third century.

According to the Oxford Dictionary of English Place-Names the origin of Elmswell or in its Old English form Elmswella, as referred to in the Domesday Book of 1086 comes from 'Spring or Stream where elm-trees grow. The place name Elmswella is formed by the conjunction of elm + wella, where wella is Old English for stream.

A huge village green – Butten Haugh Green – once formed the centre of Elmswell. However, the arrival of the railway in 1846 and the bacon factory in 1911, meant the green now has houses built on it.

The 1881 census showed that the number of dwellings in the village was 196 and the population was 761.

== Present Elmswell ==
The village was struck by an F1/T2 tornado on 23 November 1981, as part of the record-breaking nationwide tornado outbreak on that day.

Currently, the number of houses is over 2000 and the number of inhabitants is over 4750.

The Church of St John the Divine in Church Hill was mentioned in the Domesday Book. Sir Robert Gardiner, former Lord Chief Justice of Ireland, the lord of the manor, who died in 1620, built almshouses next to the church and left them to three women from Elmswell and three from the nearby village of Norton. He is buried in St John the Divine.

The village has had a railway station since 1846, on the line between Bury St Edmunds and Ipswich. There is a wildlife area at Kiln Meadow, and two pubs – The Tavern and The Fox - exist in the village.

Elmswell was named Suffolk's village of the year in 2008 beating Cockfield and Fressingfield into second and third place respectively.

The village is home to Elmswell Cricket Club who play at the Blackbourne. The team, skippered by Ben Whatling, compete in The Suffolk Cricket League and Colchester Indoor League.
