= Capel St Mary =

Village in Suffolk, England

Coordinates: 52.002°N 1.046°E

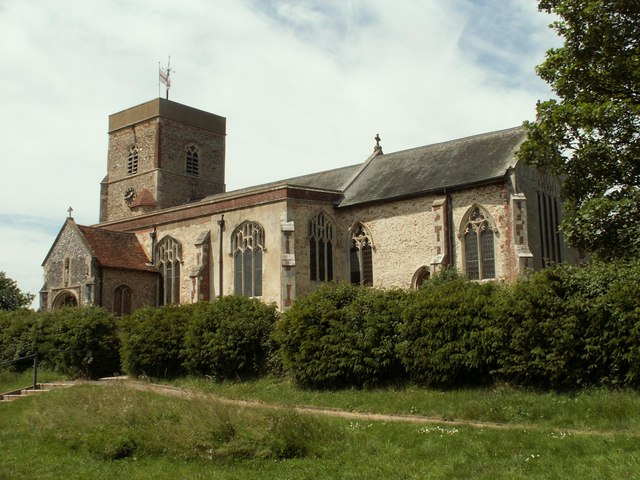
- St Mary's church, Capel St Mary

- Location within Suffolk
- Area: 7.79 km^{2} (3.01 sq mi)
- Population: 2,877 (2001 Census); 2,847 (2011)
  - Density: 8,280/sq mi (3,200/km^{2})
- OS grid reference: TM092381
- District: Babergh
- Shire county: Suffolk
- Region: East
- Country: England
- Sovereign state: United Kingdom
- Post town: IPSWICH
- Postcode district: IP9
- Dialling code: 01473
- UK Parliament: South Suffolk

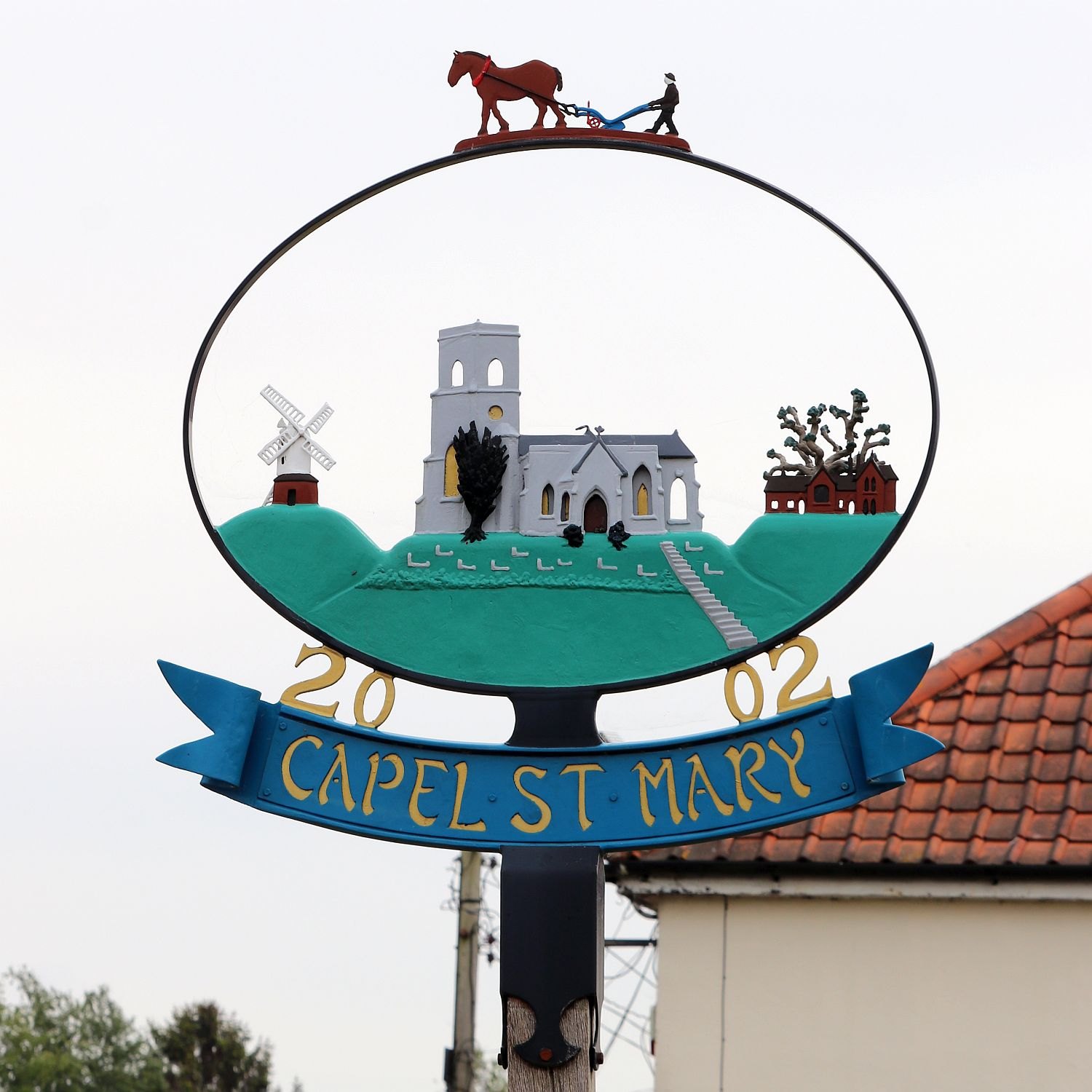
Capel St Mary Village Sign

Capel St Mary – commonly known as Capel – is a village and civil parish in the Babergh district, in the county of Suffolk, England. It is about 6 miles (10 km) south-west of Ipswich and 2 miles (3 km) from Dedham Vale, which is a designated Area of Outstanding Natural Beauty. In 2011 the parish had a population of 2847.

== History ==
=== Early history ===
The village was listed in the Domesday Book of 1086 as part of the manor of Boynton. An early 13th-century charter from nearby Dodnash Priory was the first to mention it by its current name, derived from the Norman-French and Welsh capel, meaning chapel.

Tentative evidence of Bronze Age habitation has recently been unearthed just outside the boundaries of the village, and well-documented human settlement in the area dates from the Roman period. Evidence of a villa was found while building council houses on Windmill Hill at the west end of the village in the 1930s, with remains of a kiln nearby and smaller artefacts such as coins and tiles.

A fortified house was built in nearby Little Wenham between 1260 and 1290. It is believed to be one of the first examples of fortified houses made from English brick.

=== Rail ===
A railway station was built as part of the Hadleigh branch line in 1847. The station was closed to passengers in 1932 but freight services continued until 1965, when the line was closed as a result of the Beeching Axe.

=== 20th century ===
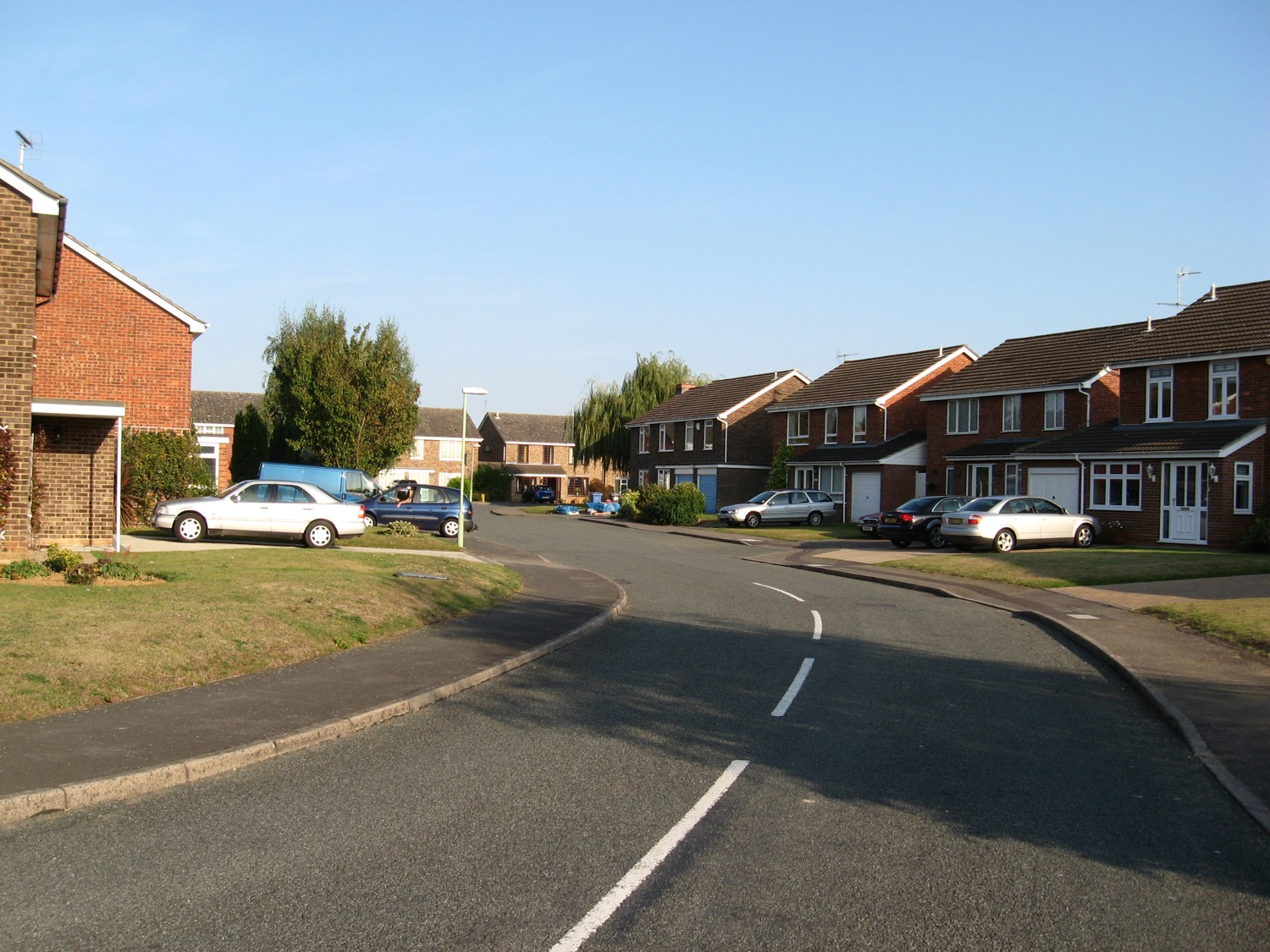
A road demonstrating the open-plan layout of the new houses

During the Second World War, the village was frequented by American airmen from nearby RAF Raydon. Men from the village were involved in two local Auxiliary Units, Wenham and Capel, part of the 202nd battalion of the Home Guard. The Wenham unit was based at a dugout under Jermyn's Farm to the north of the village, and a dugout a short distance away housed their supply of explosives. The Capel unit was based in woods near Bentley; the three dugouts at their disposal housed ammunition, a field telephone, and their supplies of gelignite and plastic explosive. The explosives were destroyed in-situ after the end of hostilities because they were deemed too dangerous to move.

In 1960, initial plans were drawn up for significant housing development and mains sewerage in the village – the latter was needed following the introduction of mains water in 1951. These were finalised by 1963, initiating an expansion of the village from some 632 people in 1961 to a peak of 3,176 people in 1991. The new houses were built with an open-plan design: front gardens were not to be enclosed, and grass verges were to separate fences from the pavement. Plans for the village shopping centre were approved in 1974.

== Facilities ==
Most facilities are located in the centre of the village, including the Co-Op and independent shops such as a bakery, hairdresser, and a newsagent. There is also a post office and doctors' surgery with a pharmacy.

Capel's one pub, the White Horse is found at the east end of the village. A second pub, The Plough, closed in 1996. Capel also has a bar in the heart of the village near the shops attached to the village hall, providing entertainment such as tribute acts, Bingo and an annual Bar Olympics.

=== Recreation ===
The large playing field which includes football pitches, tennis courts, a cricket ground and a bowling green. There is also a children's playground at the same site. A fireworks display is held here annually on the 5 November. The pitches are home to Capel Plough F.C., which plays in the Suffolk and Ipswich Football League. The village hall and the attached bar are used by many societies. These are maintained by the Capel Community Trust

There is a Scout troop based in the village, with its own HQ and close to 100 members in January 2013.

=== Education ===
The village has a primary school. Most pupils then go to East Bergholt High School, or to selective or private secondary schools in nearby Ipswich or Colchester.

=== Religious sites ===
The village is in the Anglican parish of Capel St Mary with Little Wenham and Great Wenham. Construction of the parish church of St Mary, Virgin and Mother, began in the early 13th century, but most of it dates from the 15th century. However, the churchyard was found to contain Roman cremation urns, when digging took place for a northern extension in the late 1990s.

The village has a Methodist church and a Community church. The three churches are active and work closely together. Roman Catholic services were also being conducted in St Mary's, but declining numbers of priests meant this ceased to be feasible. The nearest Catholic services are in Ipswich and Brantham.

=== Transport ===
Capel sits next to the A12 road, which links the village to Ipswich and Colchester. There is a local bus service.

== Demography ==
Capel St Mary compared
2001 UK census	Capel St Mary	Babergh	England
Total population	2,877	83,461	49,138,831
White	98.3%	98.7%	91%
Asian	0.4%	0.3%	4.6%
Black	0.2%	0.2%	2.3%

According to the Office for National Statistics, the United Kingdom Census 2001 found a population of 2,877 in Capel St Mary. The 2001 population density was 8,280 inhabitants per square mile (3,197/km^{2}), with a 100 to 94.9 female-to-male ratio. Of those over 16, 19.1% were single (never married), 59.4% married and 5.5% divorced. Capel St Mary's 1,105 households included 17.1% singles, 58.1% cohabiting married couples, 4.2% co-habiting couples and 6.5% single parents with children. Of those aged 16–74, 19.1% had no academic qualifications, much lower than the averages of Babergh (27.8%) and England (28.9%).

At the 2001 UK census, 78.8% of Capel St Mary's residents reported themselves as Christian, 0.2% Hindu, 0.2% Jewish, and 0.1% Buddhist. The census recorded 13.8% with no religion, 0.2% with an alternative religion, and 6.8% not stating their religion.

=== Population change ===
Population growth in Capel St Mary since 1881
Year	1871	1881	1891	1901	1911	1921	1931	1951	1961	2001	2011
Population	593	567	605	526	516	480	504	582	632	2,877	2,847
Source: A Vision of Britain through Time (to 2001); 2011 census

== Economy ==
Capel St Mary compared
2001 UK Census	Capel St Mary	Babergh	England
Population of working age	2,136	59,886	35,532,091
Full-time employment	41.3%	40.3%	40.8%
Part-time employment	16.5%	13.5%	11.8%
Self-employed	9.6%	11.7%	8.3%
Unemployed	1.5%	2.2%	3.3%
Retired	15.5%	15.5%	13.5%

According to the 2001 UK census, the employment of residents aged 16–74 was 16.2% retail and wholesale, 13.3% property and business services, 11.4% transport and communications, 10.9% finance, 9.7% manufacturing, 8.1% health and social work, 6.9% education, 6.1% construction, 5.7% public administration, 5.3% hotels and restaurants, 1.4% agriculture, 1.3% energy and water supply, and 3.8% other. Compared with national figures, Capel St Mary had a relatively high proportion of residents working in energy and water supply (0.9% nationally), transport and communications (7.0% nationally), and finance (5.1%), and a relatively low proportion in manufacturing (17.6% nationally).

Although the proportion of non-working people in Capel St Mary was similar to the national average (1.5%), it was below the borough average (3.5%). The census recorded the economic activity of residents aged 16–74 as 3.1% students with jobs, 2.8% students without jobs, 6.1% looking after home or family, 2.5% permanently sick or disabled, and 1.1% economically inactive for other reasons.

== Notable people ==
Lieutenant-General Sir Edwin Alderson (1859–1927), first commander of the Canadian Expeditionary Force in World War I, was born at Capel.
