= Stowupland High School =

Location
- Church Road; Stowupland, Suffolk, IP14 4BQ; England; 52°11′55″N 1°01′43″E

Information
- Type: Academy
- Established: 1978
- Local authority: Suffolk County Council
- Trust: Oxlip Learning Partnership
- Department for Education URN: 151384 Tables
- Ofsted: Reports
- Principal: Lee Walker
- Gender: Co-educational
- Age: 11 to 18
- Houses: Anderson, Boudicca, Clarkson, Edmund, Ryder, Wolsey
- Website: www.stowuplandhighschool.co.uk

Stowupland High School is a co-educational secondary school and sixth form in the Suffolk village of Stowupland.

It caters for students aged 11–18 from Year 7 – Year 11 in the main school and Year 12 and 13 in the sixth form.

Previously a community school administered by Suffolk County Council, in September 2016 Stowupland High School converted to academy status. At the time of inspection in 2023, the school was part of a multi-academy trust (MAT), the John Milton Academy Trust. As of 2025, it is part of a different MAT, the Oxlip Learning Partnership.

== History ==
The school was set up in 1978.

== Inspections ==
As of 2025, the school's most recent inspection by Ofsted was in 2023, with a judgement of Requires Improvement.
