= Ormiston Endeavour Academy =

Location
- Defoe Road; Ipswich, Suffolk, IP1 6SG; England; 52.08504°N 1.13799°E

Information
- Type: Academy
- Specialist: Science
- Gender: Coeducational
- Age: 11 to 16
- Website: http://www.ormistonendeavouracademy.co.uk/

Ormiston Endeavour Academy (formerly Thurleston High School) is a secondary school with academy status located in Ipswich in the English county of Suffolk.

The school is sponsored by the Ormiston Academies Trust.
