= Barningham, Suffolk =

Village in Suffolk, England

Coordinates: 52.35°N 0.883°E

Barningham
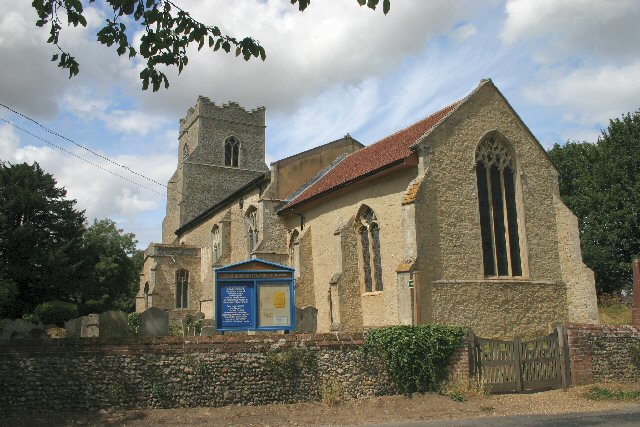
- Church of St Andrew

- Location within Suffolk
- Interactive map of Barningham
- Population: 956 (2011 census)
- District: West Suffolk
- Shire county: Suffolk
- Region: East
- Country: England
- Sovereign state: United Kingdom
- Post town: Bury St Edmonds
- Postcode district: IP31

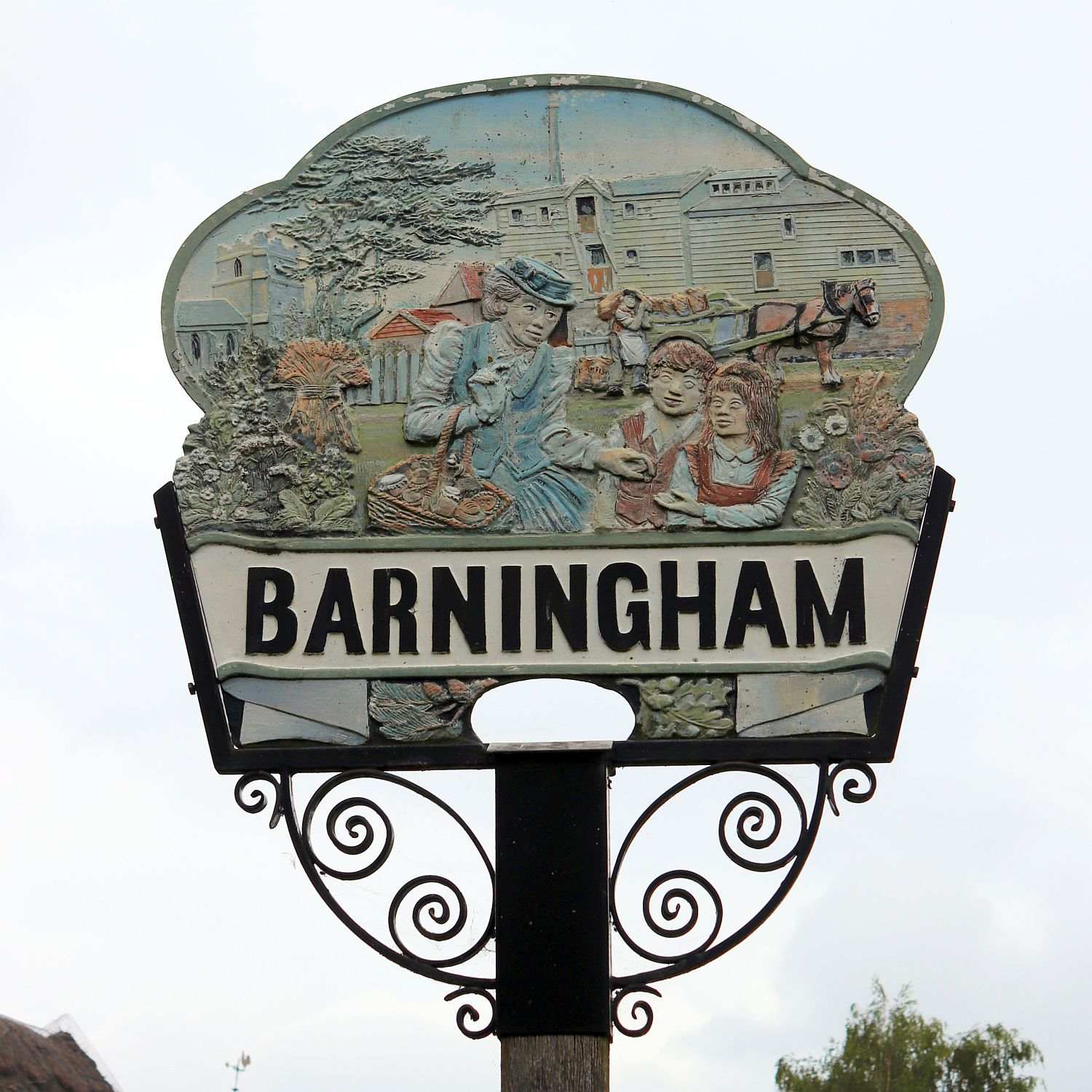
Barningham Village Sign, Suffolk

Barningham is a village and civil parish in the West Suffolk district of Suffolk, England, about twelve miles north-east of Bury St Edmunds. According to Eilert Ekwall, the meaning of the village name is the homestead of Beorn's people. The Domesday Book records that Barningham had 35 households in 1086. It has a primary school, a pub called the Royal George, a shop with a post office, a church, a hairdresser's and a village hall. In the 2011 census, the population was recorded as being 956.

The puritan Maurice Barrow, one of the richest men in 17th-century Suffolk, bought the manor and estate of Barningham in 1628 from the widow of Henry Mason.

The pharmaceutical company Fisons, founded by James Fison and Lee Charters in the late 18th century, began as a flour mill and bakery in the village. The building has since been developed into terraced homes.
