= Thurston Community College =

Community school in Thurston, Suffolk, England

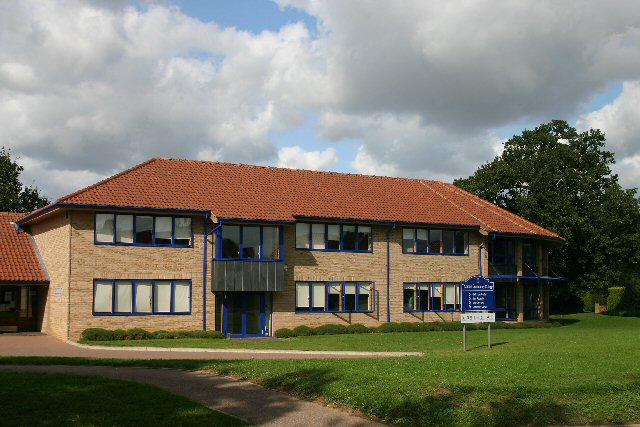

Location
- Thurston, Suffolk, IP31 3PB; England; 52°15′17″N 0°48′35″E

Information
- Type: Community school
- Motto: Loyaute me lie (Loyalty binds me)
- Established: 1973
- Local authority: Suffolk
- Department for Education URN: 124802 Tables
- Ofsted: Reports
- Principal: Maéve Taylor
- Chairman of Governors: Robert Davie
- Staff: 170
- Gender: Coeducational
- Age: 11 to 18
- Enrolment: 1,733
- Colours: Blue, gold, red
- Website: http://www.thurstoncollege.org/

Thurston Community College is a co-educational secondary school and sixth form located in Thurston, Suffolk, England. As of 2018, it had 1,733 students aged 11–18 drawn from the local village and surrounding rural communities.

== History ==
The community college was founded in 1973, and was originally known as Thurston Upper School.

In 2023, the school was identified as having buildings that could be structurally unsound because reinforced autoclaved aerated concrete had been used in its construction.

=== Transition to two-tier education structure ===
In September 2014, the school underwent a large transition in order to become a secondary school and follow the two-tier education structure. Because of this, the Thurston Sixth Form Centre was relocated to Beyton, on the site of the former Beyton Middle School, and is now known as Thurston Sixth: Beyton Campus. The most junior year group was lowered from Year 9 to Year 7. The old Sixth Form Centre, now a humanities department, was opened in 2002 by Rt Hon David Puttnam.

== The college today ==
The school's facilities include a community library, a large sixth form centre (based in Beyton) and an Air Training Corps building. It has a total staff of around 170.

In its most recent Ofsted inspection report in 2018, the school was rated Good. The school has been rated Good every inspection except for 2010, when the school was rated outstanding.

A new external building was constructed in 2023, containing three social sciences classrooms and two science labs.

=== Old Houses ===
Until 2020, the school was divided into five houses, each named after a notable British figure with connections to Suffolk. In 2020, the house system was remade and year group blocks were introduced.

Students were assigned to a tutor group, which belonged to one of the houses. House assemblies were held regularly, and students could take part in inter-house competitions such as sports days. A House Council provided a platform for student representation, and each house was supported by a dedicated House Leader and Student Support Officer.

Each house had its own distinct identity, featuring a colour scheme, mascot, motto, and departmental associations.

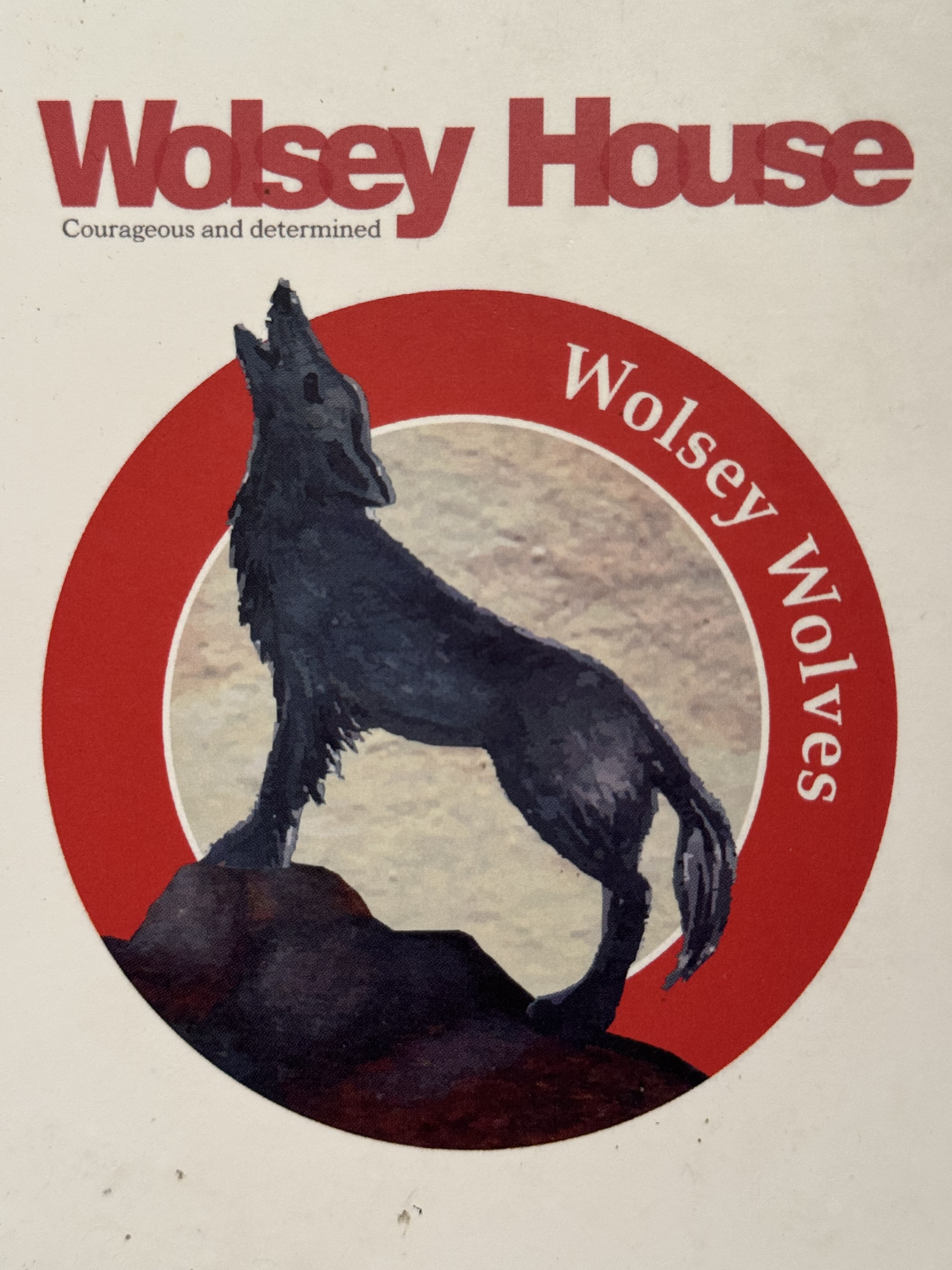
Page from the 2016–17 Thurston Community College student planner showing house system information

- Anderson – Named after Elizabeth Garrett Anderson, Britain's first female physician. Represented by the colour purple and the Anderson Anacondas, with the motto "We leave no one behind." Anderson was associated with the Science department.
- Gainsborough – Named after the painter Thomas Gainsborough. Represented by the colour green and a phoenix mascot, with the motto "Strength and diversity." Gainsborough included the Design Technology, Drama, and Art departments.
- Penrose – Named after mathematician Roger Penrose. Represented by the colour light blue and the Penrose Panthers. Its motto was "Penrose and proud." Penrose covered the Mathematics and Music departments.
- Rendell – Named after author Ruth Rendell. Represented by the colour yellow and the Rendell Rhinos. Rendell included the English and Foreign Languages departments.
- Wolsey – Named after Thomas Wolsey, a key figure in the court of Henry VIII. Represented by the colour red and the Wolsey Wolves, with the motto "Courageous and determined." Wolsey was based in a separate building—formerly the sixth form block—after the sixth form relocated to Beyton in 2014. This building also housed the school's library and had its own sports hall used for assemblies, sports events, and results days. Wolsey included the History, Geography, Philosophy, and Religious Studies departments.

New Houses

The new houses are slightly different than the old ones, but have new names and colours but no logo, motto or animal. They are embroidered onto the students uniform based on what Form Tutor they are placed in. Each house usually gets 2 Form Tutors to have, though sometimes one can get 3 depending on how many students there are in a year group.

- Peake - Named after Tim Peake and represented by the colour purple
- Turing - Named after Alan Turing and represented by the colour blue
- McKellen - Named after Ian McKellen and represented by the colour green
- Mandela - Named after Nelson Mandela and represented by the colour Yellow
- Watson - Named after Emma Watson and represented by the colour red

New School Building

In May 2025, TCC announced that they had acquired 4 acres of land next to the existing school buildings.

Following this announcement, on January 20th 2026 a public exhibition was open for contractors to give ideas for a new school building being developed. This was held by Bowmer + Kirkland, who the Department of Education had appointed to lead the project.

In August 2026, a newsletter went out to announce what the school was going to do with the land, confirming that they are turning it into a new main school building for students, and that the current school building would be used as a new sixth form college. Later in August, they began to sample the soil of the new land.

== Principals ==
- 2002–2005: Chris Bowler
- 2005–2021: Helen Wilson
- 2021–2023: Nicki Mattin (formerly head teacher of Spires Academy, Canterbury)
- 2023–present: Maéve Taylor (interim principal from Claydon High School)

== Notable former pupils ==
- Joanne Jennings, represented Great Britain and England at high jump
- John-Henry Phillips FSA, award-winning author, Romani archaeologist, and television presenter
- Kate Quilton, television presenter and journalist
- Kate Smurthwaite, comedian
- Gary Stevens, footballer for Tottenham Hotspur FC
- Daniel Wakelin, palaeographist and academic

== External sources ==
- Thurston Community College website
- Thurston Community College description on The Good Schools Guide
- Thurston Community College Building Plans
