= Thurston, Suffolk =

Village in Suffolk, England

Coordinates: 52.24994°N 0.8259°E

Thurston
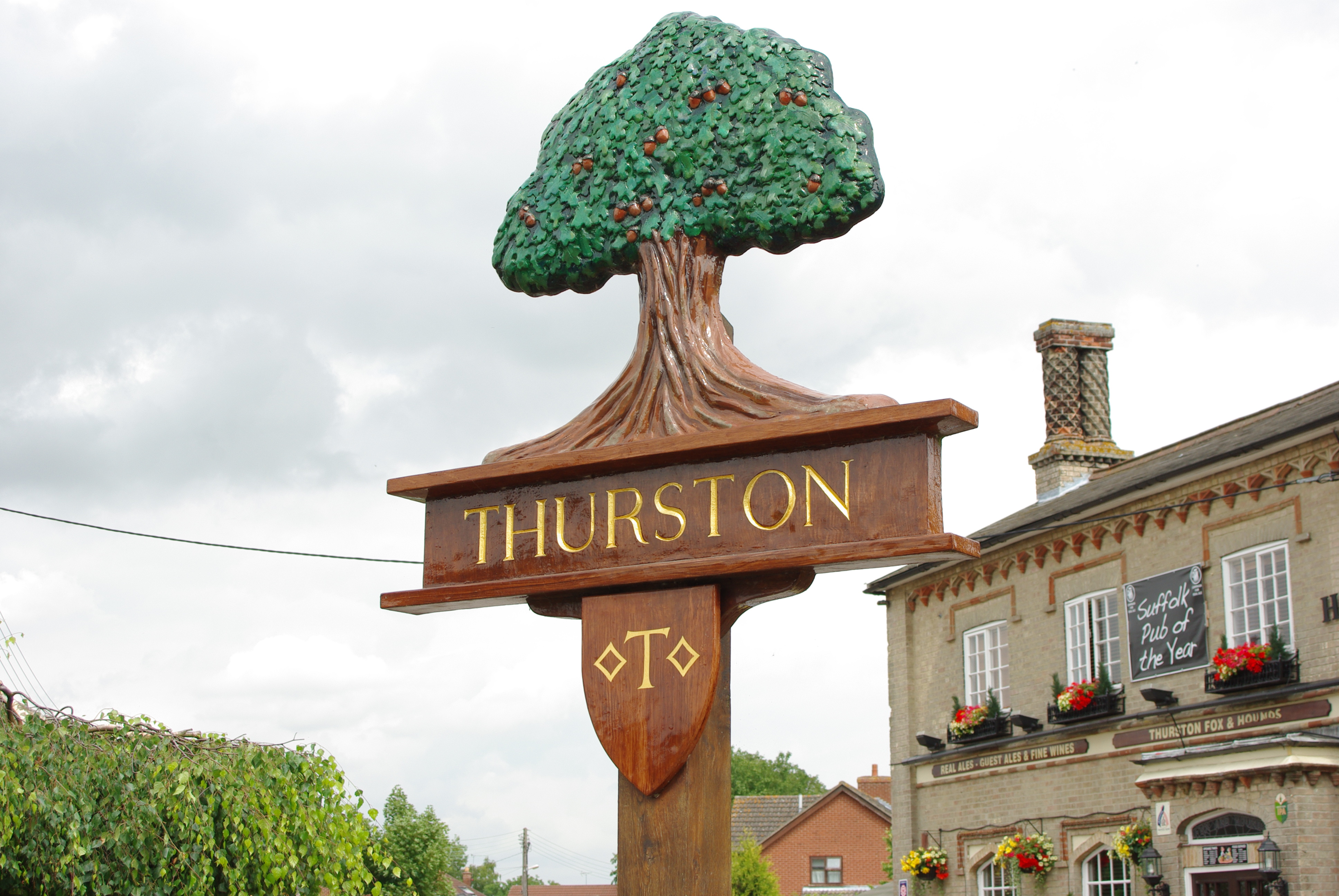
- Thurston village sign

- Location within Suffolk
- Population: 3,232 (2011 Census)
- OS grid reference: TL929650
- District: Mid Suffolk
- Shire county: Suffolk
- Region: East
- Country: England
- Sovereign state: United Kingdom
- Post town: BURY ST EDMUNDS
- Postcode district: IP31
- Dialling code: 01359
- Police: Suffolk
- Fire: Suffolk
- Ambulance: East of England
- UK Parliament: Bury St Edmunds and Stowmarket

Thurston is a village and a parish in Suffolk situated about 4 miles (6 km) east of Bury St Edmunds and 10 miles (16 km) west of Stowmarket.

In mid-2005, Thurston's estimated population was 3,260, making it one of the larger communities in the area, falling slightly to 3,232 at the 2011 Census.

Thurston railway station opened in 1846 and is still operating today. The village also has a frequent bus service to neighbouring towns, including Bury St Edmunds. The village is located under 2 miles (3 km) from the A14 and under 40 miles (64 km) from the M11 motorway.

== History ==
The village is recorded in the Domesday Book as having a population of 66 households. It was part of the lands of the Abbey of Bury St Edmunds, then one of the largest landlords in England. Thurston was located in the middle of Thedwastre Hundred, an administrative district in the Middle Ages. The village sign depicts a tree, representing "Theodwards’s tree". This tree may have been the meeting place of the Hundred Court in Thedwastre Road, Thurston.

By the 1870s, the village had grown substantially. It is mentioned in John Marius Wilson's Imperial Gazetteer of England and Wales as a community with 2,200 acres of land, a population of 740 and 157 households. . Since 2017, an additional 900 homes have been built in the village. The village's farming past is reflected in its listed buildings, which include several former farmhouses and associated farm buildings.

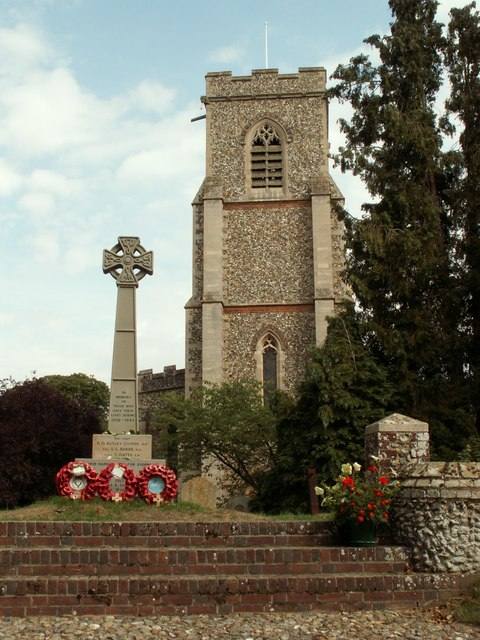
St. Peter's Church, Thurston and war memorial (geograph.org.uk)

St. Peter's Church is at the geographical centre of the village and has services every Sunday at 10.30 am. The original church was Medieval, but was largely rebuilt in 1861 after a dramatic collapse of the tower onto the nave the night before major renovations were due to begin. Its architect was John Henry Hakewill (son of the distinguished architect Henry Hakewill), and rebuilding took 18 months and cost around £3,500. Some 14th and 15th-century features, including the font, chancel windows and vestry were retrieved and reinstated in the Victorian church.

The church is Grade II listed. The church's ring of five bells was augmented to six, after a donation of a bell from St Albans Abbey by the charity the Keltek Trust in 2012.

Thurston also has a small Methodist church in Church Road, which also conducts regular services.

The original village hall, still known as The Cavendish Hall, was gifted (both land and building costs) to Thurston in 1913 by Julia Florence Cavendish, the American-born wife of Tyrell William Cavendish, who died on the Titanic. The couple had joined the ship's maiden voyage to New York to see Julia Cavendish's father Henry Siegel shortly after purchasing Thurston House, which they were renovating. After Tyrell's death, Julia asked the Parish Council if the Hall could be built as his memorial, but sold Thurston Hall without living in it.

== Village amenities ==
In addition to Cavendish Hall, Thurston has a second hall, known as the New Green Centre, which opened in 1991. It is set in parkland and operates as a venue for village sports activities, clubs, meetings and events. Other activities in the village include an Air Training Corps squadron.

There is a small business park, known as Thurston Granary, located in the village. The village has two pubs. There is also a bar at the Grange Hotel (formerly known as Thurston Grange), a mock Tudor hotel with banqueting and conference facilities.

The local public upper school is Thurston Community College, with about 1,500 pupils from the village and surrounding communities. The school also has a sixth form, with 400–500 students, and a primary school with around 200 students.

The village has two churches; the parish church, St Peter's, which is part of the a joint benefice with Great Barton parish church, and a branch of Forge, a non-conformist multi-site free church based in Suffolk.

== External sources ==
- Thurston Parish Site
- Thurston Railway History
