= Stowmarket South Division, Suffolk =

Electoral division in Suffolk

Stowmarket South
- County Council constituency for the Suffolk County Council
- District: Mid Suffolk
- Region: East of England
- Population: 9,956 (2019)
- Electorate: 7,462 (2021)
- Major settlements: Combs Ford, Stowmarket

Current constituency
- Created: 2005
- Seats: 1
- Councillor: Keith Scarff (Liberal Democrats)
- Local council: Mid Suffolk District Council
- Created from: Stowmarket St. Marys
- Replaced by: Stowmarket East, Stowmarket West

Stowmarket South Division is an electoral division in Mid Suffolk District, Suffolk which returns a single County Councillor to Suffolk County Council.

== Geography ==
The division entirely urban and contains the southern part of the town of Stowmarket. It has higher-than-average proportion of people over the age of 50.

== History ==
The division has always been competitive with no one receiving more than 40% of vote until 2021.

== Boundaries and boundary changes ==
=== 2005–present ===
- Mid Suffolk District Wards of Stowmarket Central, Stowmarket South.

== Members for Stowmarket South ==
Member	Party	Term	Notes
Keith Myers-Hewitt	Conservative	2005	Resigned from the Conservative group after making a racist remark
Keith Myers-Hewitt	Independent	2005	Died November 2005
Anne Whybrow	Conservative	2006–2013	
Stephen Searle	UKIP	2013–2017	
Nick Gowrley	Conservative	2017–2021	Leader of Mid Suffolk District Council (2016–2019)
Keith Scarff	Liberal Democrats	2021–present	

== Election results ==
=== Elections in the 2020s ===
2021 Suffolk County Council election:Stowmarket South
Party	Candidate	Votes	%	±%
Liberal Democrats	Keith Scarff	1,030	40.3	▲7.5
Conservative	Nick Gowrley *	854	33.4	▼4.9
Labour	Emma Bonner-Morgan	380	14.9	▲2.1
Independent	David Card	292	11.4	N/A
Majority		176	6.9	
Turnout		2,580	34.7	▲3.3
Registered electors		7,462		
Liberal Democrats gain from Conservative		Swing	+6.2	
