= Combs Ford =

Coordinates: 52.177367°N 0.993816°E

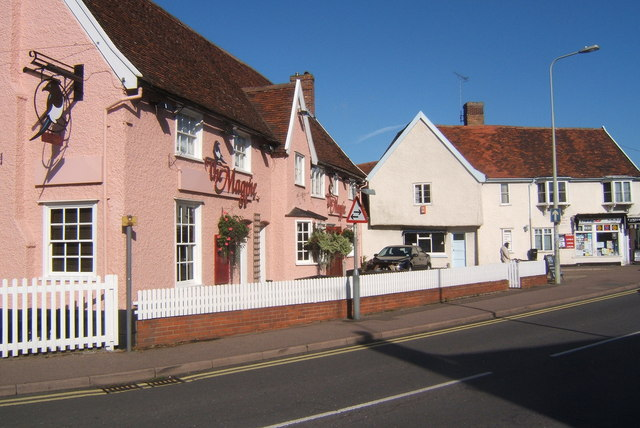
- The Magpie pub, Combs Ford

- Location within Suffolk
- OS grid reference: TM0557
- District: Mid Suffolk
- Shire county: Suffolk
- Region: East
- Country: England
- Sovereign state: United Kingdom
- Post town: Stowmarket
- Postcode district: IP14
- Dialling code: 01449
- Police: Suffolk
- Fire: Suffolk
- Ambulance: East of England
- UK Parliament: Central Suffolk and North Ipswich

Combs Ford is a suburb of Stowmarket in Suffolk, England. It sits at the confluence between the rivers Gipping and Rattlesden.

Combs Ford is where the procession of the Stowmarket Carnival changes as it swings between The Magpie and The Gladstone public houses and proceeds towards Ipswich Street near The Regal cinema. Its school (Combs Ford Primary School) used to be a middle school up until 2015 when the United Kingdom government transitioned to a two-tiered education system.
