= Stowmarket (North) Ward =

Electoral ward of Mid Suffolk, England

The candidate information for the Stowmarket (North) Ward in Mid-Suffolk, Suffolk, England. This ward elects three councillors.

== Councillors ==
Election	Member	Party	Member	Party	Member	Party
2011	Garry Green	Conservative	Frank Whittle	Conservative	Duncan Macpherson	Labour
2015	Garry Green	Conservative	Barry Humphreys	Conservative	David Muller	Conservative

== 2011 Results ==
Candidate name:	Party:	Votes:	% of votes:
Green, Gary	Conservative	1202	22.18
Whittle, Frank	Conservative	1033	19.06
Macpherson, Duncan	Labour	855	15.77
Woodley, Pete	Conservative	813	15.00
Rozier, Nigel	Green	737	13.60
Sharma, Brij	Liberal Democrat	432	7.97
Lay, Colin	UK Independence Party	348	6.42

== 2015 Results ==
The turnout of the election was 62.70%.

Candidate name:	Party name:	Votes:	% of votes:
Gary GREEN	Conservative	2292	21.65
Barry HUMPHREYS	Conservative	1948	18.40
David MULLER	Conservative	1705	16.10
Duncan MACPHERSON	Labour	1284	12.13
Nigel ROZIER	Green	1145	10.82
Christopher STREATFIELD	UKIP	1132	10.69
John BETTS-DAVIES	Green	1081	10.21

== See also ==
- Mid Suffolk local elections
