= Prentice Brothers =

Coordinates: 52.186590°N 1.004999°E

Prentice Brothers Limited
- Company type: Limited company
- Industry: Chemicals
- Founded: c.1856; 170 years ago in Stowmarket, England
- Founder: Thomas Prentice
- Defunct: 1929
- Fate: Merged with Packard and James Fison (Thetford) Limited
- Successor: Fisons
- Products: Fertilisers
- Number of employees: 40 (1874)

Prentice Brothers Limited was an English fertiliser manufacturer founded in Stowmarket, Suffolk during the mid-1850s. The company produced a number of "chemical manure" products that used coprolites and rock phosphates among other ingredients.

== History ==
The Prentice family was prominent in Stowmarket at the time and operated a number of other businesses including a gasworks, corn and coal merchants, maltsters and a Guncotton Company.

The fertiliser business was founded by Thomas Prentice and by 1866 was being run by his brothers, Eustace and Edward. Manning Prentice joined the business in 1871 after Edward was killed in the nearby Guncotton explosion. Manning Prentice developed patented techniques and processes around acids.

In 1922 a fire destroyed part of the works and needed to be rebuilt, and the 1920s was a problematic period for the industry partly due to falling demand. In 1929 the company merged with Packard and James Fison (Thetford) Limited whose company was subsequently renamed to Fison, Packard & Prentice, Limited. The Prentice and Fison families had previously been joined by the marriage. That company then formally changed its name to the shorter Fisons Ltd in 1942.

The Food Museum has a number of items from the company including a coprolite grinding stone apparently used by the company.

== Location ==
The Prentice Chemical Works was located on the eastern side of the railway line approaching to Stowmarket railway station. The business made use of the railway to transport its goods. Today, the area is occupied by the Tomo Industrial Estate.

== See also ==
- Stowmarket Guncotton Company
