= Stowmarket (Central) Ward =

Electoral ward of Mid Suffolk, England

The candidate information for the Stowmarket (Central) Ward in Mid-Suffolk, Suffolk, England. This ward elects two councillors.

== Councillors ==
Election	Member	Party	Member	Party
2011	Poppy Robinson	Conservative	Lesley Mayes	Conservative
2015	Paul Ekpenyong	Conservative	Lesley Mayes	Conservative

== 2011 Results ==
Candidate name:	Party:	Votes:	% of votes:
Robinson, Poppy	Conservative	744	27.22
Mayes, Lesley	Conservative	636	23.27
Britton, Suzanne	Labour	398	14.56
Betts-Davies, Gareth	Green	363	13.28
Griffith, David	UK Independence Party	252	9.22
Curle, John	Liberal Democrat	176	6.44
Groundsell, Colin	Liberal Democrat	164	6.00

== 2015 Results ==
The turnout of the election was 67.71%.

Candidate name:	Party name:	Votes:	% of votes: 3918
Lesley MAYES	Conservative	966	24.66
Paul EKPENYONG	Conservative	865	22.08
Stephen Searle	UKIP	607	15.49
Suzanne BRITTON	Labour	505	12.89
Linda BAXTER	Green	421	10.75
Miles ROW	Green	322	8.22
John CURLE	Liberal Democrats	232	5.92

== See also ==
- Mid Suffolk local elections
