= 2013 Suffolk County Council election =

2013 UK local government election

- 2 May 2013

All 75 seats in the Suffolk County Council 38 seats needed for a majority
- Turnout: 30.99%
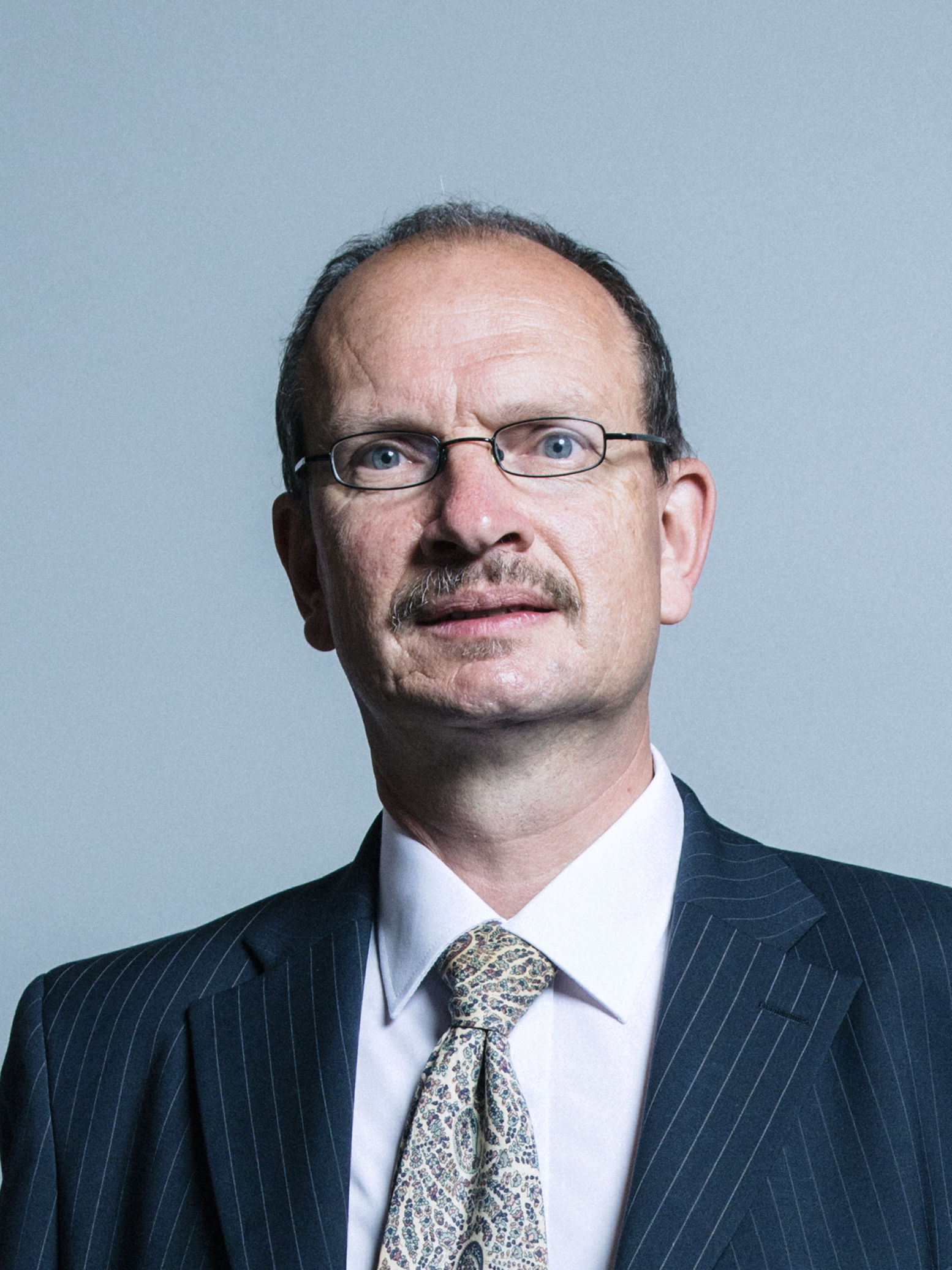

| | First party | Second party | Third party |
|---|---|---|---|
| | Con | | UKIP |
| Leader | Mark Bee | Sandy Martin | Bill Mountford |
| Party | Conservative | Labour | UKIP |
| Leader since | Apr 2011 | May 2009 | May 2009 |
| Leader's seat | Beccles | St John's | Lowestoft South |
| Last election | 55 seats, 44.1% | 4 seats, 13.6% | 1 seats, 4.4% |
| Seats before | 55 | 4 | 1 |
| Seats won | 39 | 15 | 9 |
| Seat change | ▼16 | ▲11 | ▲8 |
| Popular vote | 64,120 | 39,080 | 36,167 |
| Percentage | 35.5% | 21.6% | 20.0% |
| Swing | ▼8.6% | ▲8.0% | ▲15.5% |
| | Fourth party | Fifth party | Sixth party |
| Leader | Kathy Pollard | n/a | n/a |
| Party | Liberal Democrats | Independent | Green |
| Leader since | May 2005 | n/a | n/a |
| Leader's seat | Belstead Brook (Retiring) | n/a | n/a |
| Last election | 11 seats, 24.6% | 2 seats, 3.1% | 2 seats, 8.3% |
| Seats before | 11 | 2 | 2 |
| Seats won | 7 | 3 | 2 |
| Seat change | ▼4 | ▲1 | Steady |
| Popular vote | 19,058 | 6,495 | 15,849 |
| Percentage | 10.5% | 3.6% | 8.8% |
| Swing | ▼14.1% | ▲0.5% | ▲0.5% |
- Map of the results of the 2013 Suffolk council election. Conservatives in blue, Liberal Democrats in yellow, Labour in red, Greens in green, independent in grey and UK Independence Party in purple.

Composition after the election

Elections to Suffolk County Council took place on 2 May 2013 as part of the 2013 United Kingdom local elections. 75 councillors were elected from 63 electoral divisions, which returned either one or two county councillors each by first-past-the-post voting for a four-year term of office. The electoral divisions were the same as those used at the previous election in 2009.

Labour and the Conservatives were the only parties with candidates standing in all sixty-three electoral divisions.

All locally registered electors (British, Irish, Commonwealth and European Union citizens) who were aged 18 or over on Thursday 2 May 2013 were entitled to vote in the local elections. Those who were temporarily away from their ordinary address (for example, away working, on holiday, in student accommodation or in hospital) were also entitled to vote in the local elections, although those who had moved abroad and registered as overseas electors cannot vote in the local elections. It is possible to register to vote at more than one address (such as a university student who had a term-time address and lives at home during holidays) at the discretion of the local Electoral Register Office, but it remains an offence to vote more than once in the same local government election.

== Summary ==
The Conservative Party won a total of 39 seats, a net loss of sixteen, retaining a reduced overall majority of three seats. The Labour Party regained their position as the largest opposition party, making a net gain of 11 seats. The UK Independence Party also made gains, winning nine seats on the County Council. The Liberal Democrats lost seats to the Conservatives and to Labour, winning the same number of seats as they won in 2005, seven. Three independent candidates were elected, while the Green Party retained their two seats.

Results across the county were far from uniform. In the Suffolk Coastal district area, the Conservatives held their own, and in the Babergh district they actually made a net gain of 1 seat (Hadleigh) from the Liberal Democrats.

Mid Suffolk saw just one seat (Stowmarket South) change hands by a single vote, with UKIP gaining from the Conservatives. The Conservatives also made a net loss of two seats in St Edmundsbury after losing two seats to UKIP in Haverhill and one to an Independent in Bury St Edmunds, but then regained Hardwick from the Liberal Democrats. In other districts, however, the Conservatives lost significant ground. In Ipswich, they were reduced to a sole representative in the town after losing 4 seats and thus reversing the gains they had made in the 2009 election. After almost wiping the board in 2009, the party also suffered major losses in Waveney with 7 seats transferring to Labour and UKIP. A further two divisions switched from Conservative to UKIP in Forest Heath.

Labour made a strong recovery in Ipswich, with the party almost completely recovering from its heavy losses in the town in 2009 and returned to the Council with its best cohort since 2005 taking 10 of the 13 seats. The party also made a modest recovery in the Waveney area with a further 5 gains from the Conservatives. This though, was still 4 seats short of the 9 seats they secured in 2005. In other areas of the county, the Labour recovery failed to gain traction. They won no seats in Haverhill, Bury St Edmunds and Sudbury, which all had Labour councillors until 2009.

The Liberal Democrats made losses in three of the four seats where their incumbent councillors were not seeking re-election but held the seven seats where they had sitting councillors.

The Green Party retained its two seats with increased majorities in each, but were unable to add to their tally.

Independent councillors Richard Kemp and Trevor Beckwith retained their seats, and were joined by David Nettleton, who gained one of the Tower seats in Bury St Edmunds from the Conservatives.

== Government formation ==
With 39 seats and a third successive victory, the Conservatives were able to form a working majority of 3 in the new Council, with Mark Bee (Beccles) elected as Council Leader. Mark Bee retired as Leader in May 2015 and returned to the back benches. He was subsequently replaced by Colin Noble (Row Heath), who narrowly defeated rival Jenny Antill (Cosford) in the ensuing leadership election.

The Conservatives' majority was cut to 1 in May 2016 with the loss of Haverhill Cangle to UKIP. Four months later, Hadleigh was gained by the Liberal Democrats in a further by-election and the Conservatives lost their overall majority although continued to run the council as a minority administration for the remainder of its term.

Labour leader Sandy Martin (St John's) became leader of opposition, and David Wood (Peninsula) became Lib Dem group leader.

== Overall result ==
2013 Suffolk County Council election
| Party | Seats | Gains | Losses | Net gain/loss | Seats % | Votes % | Votes | +/− |
|---|---|---|---|---|---|---|---|---|
| Conservative | 39 | 2 | 18 | ▼16 | 52.0 | 35.5 | 64,120 | ▼8.6 |
| Labour | 15 | 11 | 0 | ▲11 | 20.0 | 21.6 | 39,080 | ▲8.0 |
| UKIP | 9 | 8 | 0 | ▲8 | 12.0 | 20.0 | 36,167 | ▲15.5 |
| Liberal Democrats | 7 | 0 | 4 | ▼4 | 9.3 | 10.5 | 19,058 | ▼14.7 |
| Independent | 3 | 1 | 0 | ▲1 | 4.0 | 3.6 | 6,495 | ▲0.5 |
| Green | 2 | 0 | 0 | Steady | 2.7 | 8.8 | 15,849 | ▲0.5 |

== Results by district ==
=== Babergh ===
District summary

| Party | Seats | +/- | Votes | % | +/- |
|---|---|---|---|---|---|
| Conservative | 7 | ▲1 | 8,167 | 35.8 | ▼8.0 |
| Liberal Democrat | 2 | ▼1 | 4,093 | 17.9 | ▼16.0 |
| Independent | 1 | Steady | 1,387 | 6.1 | ▼1.6 |
| Labour | 0 | Steady | 3,336 | 14.6 | ▲5.3 |
| UKIP | 0 | Steady | 3,299 | 14.5 | ▲10.6 |
| Green | 0 | Steady | 2,544 | 11.2 | ▲9.7 |

Division results

Belstead Brook
| Party | Candidate | Votes | % | ±% |
|---|---|---|---|---|
| Liberal Democrats | David Busby | 692 | 37.5 | ▼12.5 |
| Conservative | Peter Burgoyne | 617 | 33.5 | ▼6.6 |
| Labour | David Plowman | 332 | 18.0 | ▲8.1 |
| Green | Terry Hooley | 203 | 11.0 | N/A |
| Majority | | 75 | 4.1 | ▼5.8 |
| Turnout | | 1,858 | 27.8 | ▼8.4 |
| Liberal Democrats hold | | Swing | ▼2.9 | |

Cosford
| Party | Candidate | Votes | % | ±% |
|---|---|---|---|---|
| Conservative | Jenny Antill | 1,450 | 51.9 | ▼12.6 |
| Green | Robert Lindsay | 1,128 | 40.4 | N/A |
| Labour Co-op | Tony Bavington | 217 | 7.8 | ▼0.6 |
| Majority | | 322 | 11.5 | ▼25.8 |
| Turnout | | 2,809 | 41.7 | ▼3.4 |
| Conservative hold | | Swing | ▼26.5 | |

Great Cornard
| Party | Candidate | Votes | % | ±% |
|---|---|---|---|---|
| Conservative | Peter Beer * | 728 | 43.0 | ▼13.5 |
| Labour | Tom Keane | 536 | 31.6 | ▲18.5 |
| Green | Dean Walton | 320 | 18.9 | ▲18.9 |
| Liberal Democrats | Andrew Welsh | 111 | 6.6 | ▼24.0 |
| Majority | | 192 | 11.3 | ▼14.6 |
| Turnout | | 1,718 | 24.6 | ▼5.5 |
| Conservative hold | | Swing | ▼16.0 | |

Hadleigh
| Party | Candidate | Votes | % | ±% |
|---|---|---|---|---|
| Conservative | Brian Riley | 584 | 31.5 | ▼8.7 |
| Liberal Democrats | Trevor Sheldrick | 449 | 24.2 | ▼20.2 |
| UKIP | Barry Nutt | 422 | 22.8 | N/A |
| Labour | Angela Wiltshire | 308 | 16.6 | ▲1.3 |
| Green | Michael Fodsike | 90 | 4.9 | ▲4.9 |
| Majority | | 135 | 7.3 | |
| Turnout | | 1,854 | 28.8 | ▼5.9 |
| Conservative gain from Liberal Democrats | | Swing | ▲5.7 | |

Melford
| Party | Candidate | Votes | % | ±% |
|---|---|---|---|---|
| Independent | Richard Kemp * | 1,387 | 53.2 | ▼14.8 |
| UKIP | Dave Reynolds | 478 | 18.3 | N/A |
| Conservative | Sarah Pugh | 421 | 16.1 | ▼9.9 |
| Labour Co-op | Mick Cornish | 176 | 6.8 | ▲0.8 |
| Green | Graham Manning | 146 | 5.6 | N/A |
| Majority | | 909 | 34.9 | ▼7.0 |
| Turnout | | 2,619 | 33.6 | ▼7.7 |
| Independent hold | | Swing | ▼16.6 | |

Peninsula
| Party | Candidate | Votes | % | ±% |
|---|---|---|---|---|
| Liberal Democrats | David Wood * | 1,122 | 43.1 | ▼13.4 |
| UKIP | Christopher Streatfield | 532 | 20.5 | N/A |
| Conservative | Sian Dawson | 530 | 20.4 | ▼15.6 |
| Labour | Keith Rawlings | 257 | 9.9 | ▲2.4 |
| Green | Andrew Sterling | 161 | 6.2 | N/A |
| Majority | | 590 | 22.7 | ▲2.2 |
| Turnout | | 2,606 | 32.6 | ▼10.7 |
| Liberal Democrats hold | | Swing | ▼16.9 | |

Samford
| Party | Candidate | Votes | % | ±% |
|---|---|---|---|---|
| Conservative | Gordon Jones | 1,025 | 33.7 | ▼10.7 |
| Liberal Democrats | Michael Bamford | 773 | 25.4 | ▼13.7 |
| UKIP | Stephen Laing | 755 | 24.8 | N/A |
| Labour Co-op | Sue Thomas | 314 | 10.3 | ▲5.0 |
| Green | Lois Hickey | 173 | 5.7 | ▼5.3 |
| Majority | | 252 | 8.3 | ▲3.0 |
| Turnout | | 3,048 | 38.5 | ▼9.5 |
| Conservative hold | | Swing | ▲1.5 | |

Stour Valley
| Party | Candidate | Votes | % | ±% |
|---|---|---|---|---|
| Conservative | James Finch * | 1,129 | 42.5 | ▲0.6 |
| Liberal Democrats | Bryn Hurren | 723 | 27.2 | ▼13.4 |
| UKIP | James Carver | 585 | 22.0 | ▲7.9 |
| Labour | Jack Owen | 221 | 8.3 | ▲4.9 |
| Majority | | 406 | 15.3 | ▲14.0 |
| Turnout | | 2,671 | 43.7 | ▼11.3 |
| Conservative hold | | Swing | ▲7.0 | |

Sudbury
| Party | Candidate | Votes | % | ±% |
|---|---|---|---|---|
| Conservative | John Sayers * | 809 | 44.3 | ▼0.4 |
| Labour | Luke Cresswell | 573 | 31.4 | ▲9.8 |
| Liberal Democrats | Tony Platt | 223 | 12.2 | ▼21.5 |
| Green | Teresa Bishop | 222 | 12.2 | N/A |
| Majority | | 236 | 12.9 | ▲1.9 |
| Turnout | | 1,852 | 26.5 | ▼8.5 |
| Conservative hold | | Swing | ▼5.1 | |

Sudbury East and Waldingfield
| Party | Candidate | Votes | % | ±% |
|---|---|---|---|---|
| Conservative | Colin Spence * | 874 | 45.9 | ▼3.7 |
| UKIP | Stuart Armstrong | 527 | 27.7 | ▲3.9 |
| Labour Co-op | Russell Smith | 402 | 21.1 | ▲9.8 |
| Green | Robert Whiting | 101 | 5.3 | N/A |
| Majority | | 347 | 18.2 | ▼7.7 |
| Turnout | | 1,912 | 28.5 | ▼9.2 |
| Conservative hold | | Swing | ▼3.8 | |

=== Forest Heath ===
District summary

| Party | Seats | +/- | Votes | % | +/- |
|---|---|---|---|---|---|
| Conservative | 3 | ▼2 | 4,145 | 36.1 | ▼13.8 |
| UKIP | 2 | ▲2 | 4,095 | 35.6 | ▲14.2 |
| Labour | 0 | Steady | 1,669 | 14.5 | ▲4.7 |
| Liberal Democrat | 0 | Steady | 860 | 7.5 | ▼11.5 |
| Independent | 0 | Steady | 729 | 6.3 | ▲6.3 |

Division results

Brandon
| Party | Candidate | Votes | % | ±% |
|---|---|---|---|---|
| UKIP | Reg Silvester | 995 | 45.9 | ▲15.8 |
| Conservative | Stephen Edwards | 593 | 27.3 | ▼25.5 |
| Liberal Democrats | Ian Horner | 344 | 15.9 | ▲6.5 |
| Labour | Tom Caple | 235 | 10.8 | ▲3.1 |
| Majority | | 402 | 18.6 | |
| Turnout | | 2,167 | 30.4 | ▼2.2 |
| UKIP gain from Conservative | | Swing | ▲20.6 | |

Exning and Newmarket
| Party | Candidate | Votes | % | ±% |
|---|---|---|---|---|
| UKIP | David Hudson | 720 | 30.7 | ▲10.1 |
| Conservative | Bill Sadler * | 587 | 25.0 | ▼13.8 |
| Labour | Michael Jefferys | 471 | 20.1 | ▲8.1 |
| Independent | Simon Cole | 445 | 19.0 | N/A |
| Liberal Democrats | Ian Radford | 123 | 5.2 | ▼23.5 |
| Majority | | 133 | 5.7 | |
| Turnout | | 2,346 | 26.6 | ▼4.5 |
| UKIP gain from Conservative | | Swing | ▲11.9 | |

Mildenhall
| Party | Candidate | Votes | % | ±% |
|---|---|---|---|---|
| Conservative | James Waters | 893 | 39.3 | ▼4.6 |
| UKIP | David Chandler | 884 | 38.9 | ▲9.1 |
| Labour | Patrick Finn | 316 | 13.9 | ▲2.0 |
| Liberal Democrats | John Smith | 181 | 8.0 | ▼6.5 |
| Majority | | 9 | 0.4 | ▼13.7 |
| Turnout | | 2,274 | 31.8 | ▼1.7 |
| Conservative hold | | Swing | ▼6.8 | |

Newmarket and Red Lodge
| Party | Candidate | Votes | % | ±% |
|---|---|---|---|---|
| Conservative | Lisa Chambers * | 968 | 44.6 | ▼2.8 |
| UKIP | Dave Whitelear | 615 | 28.4 | ▲10.8 |
| Labour | Chris Turner | 450 | 20.8 | ▲11.8 |
| Liberal Democrats | Tim Huggan | 136 | 6.3 | ▼19.8 |
| Majority | | 353 | 16.3 | ▼5.1 |
| Turnout | | 2,169 | 23.3 | ▼9.5 |
| Conservative hold | | Swing | ▼6.8 | |

Row Heath
| Party | Candidate | Votes | % | ±% |
|---|---|---|---|---|
| Conservative | Colin Noble * | 1,104 | 43.4 | ▼9.1 |
| UKIP | Ian Smith | 881 | 34.7 | ▲4.5 |
| Independent | David Gathercole | 284 | 11.2 | N/A |
| Labour | Pamela Brown | 197 | 7.8 | ▲1.4 |
| Liberal Democrats | Elle Minshall | 76 | 3.0 | ▼8.0 |
| Majority | | 223 | 8.8 | ▼13.5 |
| Turnout | | 2,542 | 32.6 | ▼6.4 |
| Conservative hold | | Swing | ▼6.8 | |

=== Ipswich ===
District summary

| Party | Seats | +/- | Votes | % | +/- |
|---|---|---|---|---|---|
| Labour | 10 | ▲6 | 11,960 | 39.8 | ▲12.6 |
| Conservative | 1 | ▼5 | 7,443 | 24.8 | ▼12.3 |
| UKIP | 1 | ▲1 | 5,708 | 19.0 | N/A |
| Liberal Democrat | 1 | ▼2 | 2,600 | 8.7 | ▼14.2 |
| Green | 0 | Steady | 2,307 | 7.7 | Steady |
| Independent | 0 | Steady | 34 | 0.1 | N/A |

Division results

Bixley
| Party | Candidate | Votes | % | ±% |
|---|---|---|---|---|
| Conservative | Alan Murray * | 1,146 | 58.4 | ▼3.3 |
| Labour | Lewis Smith | 485 | 24.7 | ▲11.1 |
| Green | Catherine Struthers | 222 | 11.3 | ▼2.7 |
| Liberal Democrats | Peter Bagnall | 109 | 5.6 | ▼11.7 |
| Majority | | 661 | 33.7 | ▼4.1 |
| Turnout | | 1,984 | 34.7 | ▼5.0 |
| Registered electors | | 5,714 | | –1 |
| Conservative hold | | Swing | ▼3.9 | |

Bridge
| Party | Candidate | Votes | % | ±% |
|---|---|---|---|---|
| Labour Co-op | Bryony Rudkin * | 743 | 43.9 | ▲11.7 |
| UKIP | Alan Cotterell | 459 | 27.1 | N/A |
| Conservative | Bob Hall | 338 | 20.0 | ▼11.5 |
| Green | Eric Nelson | 83 | 4.9 | ▼6.0 |
| Liberal Democrats | Philip Green | 71 | 4.2 | ▼9.4 |
| Majority | | 284 | 16.8 | ▲16.1 |
| Turnout | | 1,700 | 23.5 | ▼4.6 |
| Registered electors | | 7,219 | | +307 |
| Labour Co-op hold | | Swing | ▼7.7 | |

Chantry (2)
| Party | Candidate | Votes | % | ±% |
|---|---|---|---|---|
| Labour | Helen Armitage | 2,169 | 41.6 | ▲6.8 |
| Labour | Peter Gardiner * | 2,051 | | |
| UKIP | Robert Newton | 1,301 | 25.0 | N/A |
| Conservative | Nadia Cenci | 1,096 | 21.0 | ▼14.5 |
| Conservative | Kevin Algar | 1,043 | | |
| Green | Barry Broom | 404 | 7.8 | N/A |
| Liberal Democrats | Julie Fletcher | 243 | 4.7 | ▼11.4 |
| Liberal Democrats | Stuart M^{c}Hardy | 146 | | |
| Majority | | 868 | 16.7 | ▲15.9 |
| Turnout | | 4,611 | 27.1 | ▼3.2 |
| Registered electors | | 17,042 | | +291 |
| Labour hold | | Swing | ▼9.1 | |
| Labour gain from Conservative | | Swing | ▲10.7 | |

Gainsborough
| Party | Candidate | Votes | % | ±% |
|---|---|---|---|---|
| Labour Co-op | Kim Cook | 1,074 | 47.4 | ▲8.4 |
| Conservative | Carol Debman * | 547 | 24.2 | ▼15.8 |
| UKIP | Stephen York | 495 | 21.9 | N/A |
| Liberal Democrats | Robert Chambers | 84 | 3.7 | ▼17.3 |
| Green | Rory James | 64 | 2.8 | N/A |
| Majority | | 527 | 23.3 | |
| Turnout | | 2,272 | 27.8 | ▼3.5 |
| Registered electors | | 8,162 | | +34 |
| Labour Co-op gain from Conservative | | Swing | ▲12.1 | |

Priory Heath
| Party | Candidate | Votes | % | ±% |
|---|---|---|---|---|
| Labour | Bill Quinton | 829 | 53.0 | ▲10.6 |
| UKIP | Michael Chelk | 325 | 20.8 | N/A |
| Conservative | Mark Felix-Thomas | 271 | 17.3 | ▼19.6 |
| Green | Fraser Florence | 73 | 4.7 | N/A |
| Liberal Democrats | Mathew Baker | 67 | 4.3 | ▼16.4 |
| Majority | | 504 | 32.2 | ▲26.7 |
| Turnout | | 1,575 | 24.8 | ▼2.7 |
| Registered electors | | 6,344 | | +103 |
| Labour hold | | Swing | ▼5.1 | |

Rushmere
| Party | Candidate | Votes | % | ±% |
|---|---|---|---|---|
| Labour | Sandra Gage | 1,117 | 47.3 | ▲21.7 |
| Conservative | Judy Terry * | 628 | 26.6 | ▼16.8 |
| UKIP | Peter Ellis | 401 | 17.0 | N/A |
| Green | Kirsty Wilmot | 94 | 4.0 | ▼11.6 |
| Liberal Democrats | Gareth Jones | 90 | 3.8 | ▼11.7 |
| Independent | Dale Jackson | 34 | 1.4 | N/A |
| Majority | | 489 | 20.7 | |
| Turnout | | 2,366 | 32.9 | ▼6.2 |
| Registered electors | | 7,193 | | +100 |
| Labour gain from Conservative | | Swing | ▲19.3 | |

St Helen's
| Party | Candidate | Votes | % | ±% |
|---|---|---|---|---|
| Labour | Mandy Gaylard | 900 | 45.6 | ▲21.1 |
| UKIP | Mark Tinney | 361 | 18.3 | N/A |
| Conservative | Katherine Parkinson | 359 | 18.2 | ▼7.9 |
| Green | Tom Wilmot | 201 | 10.2 | ▼7.8 |
| Liberal Democrats | Timothy Lockington | 155 | 7.8 | ▼23.7 |
| Majority | | 539 | 27.3 | |
| Turnout | | 1,980 | 26.1 | ▼3.6 |
| Registered electors | | 7,592 | | |
| Labour gain from Liberal Democrats | | Swing | ▲22.4 | |

St John's
| Party | Candidate | Votes | % | ±% |
|---|---|---|---|---|
| Labour Co-op | Sandy Martin * | 1,089 | 54.6 | ▲14.3 |
| Conservative | Edward Phillips | 562 | 28.2 | ▼5.9 |
| Green | Sarah Alexander | 227 | 11.4 | ▼0.4 |
| Liberal Democrats | Robin Whitmore | 118 | 5.9 | ▼8.0 |
| Majority | | 527 | 26.4 | ▲20.2 |
| Turnout | | 2,017 | 29.7 | ▼9.1 |
| Registered electors | | 6,783 | | |
| Labour Co-op hold | | Swing | ▲10.1 | |

St. Margaret's and Westgate (2)
| Party | Candidate | Votes | % | ±% |
|---|---|---|---|---|
| Labour | Sarah Adams | 1,668 | 28.8 | ▲15.0 |
| Liberal Democrats | Inga Lockington * | 1,457 | 25.2 | ▼16.0 |
| Labour | Rob Bridgeman | 1,441 | | |
| Conservative | Lee Reynolds | 1,355 | 23.4 | ▼8.3 |
| Conservative | Christopher Stewart | 1,257 | | |
| Liberal Democrats | Cathy French | 1,211 | | |
| UKIP | John Chapman | 823 | 14.2 | N/A |
| Green | John Mann | 481 | 8.3 | ▼4.9 |
| Majority | | 211 | 3.7 | ▼5.9 |
| Turnout | | 5,134 | 33.8 | ▼4.6 |
| Registered electors | | 15,195 | | |
| Labour gain from Liberal Democrats | | Swing | ▲15.5 | |
| Liberal Democrats hold | | Swing | | |

Whitehouse & Whitton (2)
| Party | Candidate | Votes | % | ±% |
|---|---|---|---|---|
| Labour | Kathy Bole | 1,886 | 36.0 | ▲12.8 |
| UKIP | James Crossley | 1,543 | 29.5 | N/A |
| Labour | Elango Elavalakkan | 1,475 | | |
| Conservative | Robin Vickery * | 1,141 | 21.8 | ▼18.9 |
| Conservative | David Goldsmith | 1,131 | 14.1 | |
| Green | Geoff Reynish | 458 | 8.8 | N/A |
| Liberal Democrats | Oliver Holmes | 206 | 3.9 | ▼17.2 |
| Liberal Democrats | Nicholas Jacob | 173 | | |
| Majority | | 68 | 6.6 | ▼10.8 |
| Turnout | | 4,365 | 28.0 | ▼0.4 |
| Registered electors | | 15,611 | | |
| Labour gain from Conservative | | Swing | ▲15.8 | |
| UKIP gain from Conservative | | Swing | ▲24.2 | |

=== Mid Suffolk ===
District summary

| Party | Seats | +/- | Votes | % | +/- |
|---|---|---|---|---|---|
| Conservative | 5 | ▼1 | 8,749 | 35.0 | ▼8.6 |
| Liberal Democrat | 3 | Steady | 3,455 | 13.8 | ▼14.3 |
| UKIP | 1 | ▲1 | 5,903 | 23.6 | ▲20.8 |
| Green | 1 | Steady | 3,899 | 15.6 | ▲2.1 |
| Labour | 0 | Steady | 2,984 | 11.9 | ▲5.3 |

Division results

Bosmere
| Party | Candidate | Votes | % | ±% |
|---|---|---|---|---|
| Liberal Democrats | Julia Truelove * | 851 | 33.9 | ▼6.9 |
| Conservative | Esther Jewson | 678 | 27.0 | ▼0.0 |
| UKIP | Sam Streatfeild | 584 | 23.2 | ▲9.2 |
| Labour | Tony Elliott | 236 | 9.4 | ▲4.7 |
| Green | Tricia Aspinall | 160 | 6.4 | ▲6.4 |
| Majority | | 173 | 6.9 | ▼6.9 |
| Turnout | | 2,514 | 32.7 | ▼10.2 |
| Liberal Democrats hold | | Swing | ▼3.4 | |

Gipping Valley
| Party | Candidate | Votes | % | ±% |
|---|---|---|---|---|
| Liberal Democrats | John Field * | 713 | 32.0 | ▼11.6 |
| Conservative | John Whithead | 577 | 25.9 | ▲0.1 |
| UKIP | Frank Whittle | 537 | 24.1 | ▲24.1 |
| Labour Co-op | Jack Abbott | 301 | 13.5 | ▲7.9 |
| Green | David Penny | 100 | 4.5 | ▲4.5 |
| Majority | | 136 | 6.1 | ▼11.7 |
| Turnout | | 2,229 | 31.9 | ▼10.5 |
| Liberal Democrats hold | | Swing | ▼5.9 | |

Hartismere
| Party | Candidate | Votes | % | ±% |
|---|---|---|---|---|
| Conservative | Jessica Fleming | 1,086 | 43.5 | ▼11.5 |
| UKIP | Christopher Streatfield | 553 | 22.2 | ▲22.2 |
| Green | Ghed Paterson | 365 | 14.6 | ▼9.6 |
| Labour | Di McGeever | 362 | 14.5 | ▲6.8 |
| Liberal Democrats | David Payne | 129 | 5.2 | ▼7.9 |
| Majority | | 533 | 21.4 | ▼9.4 |
| Turnout | | 2,499 | 32.3 | ▼13.3 |
| Conservative hold | | Swing | ▼16.8 | |

Hoxne and Eye
| Party | Candidate | Votes | % | ±% |
|---|---|---|---|---|
| Conservative | Guy McGregor * | 1,238 | 45.6 | ▼11.2 |
| UKIP | Paul Denham | 666 | 24.5 | ▲24.5 |
| Labour Co-op | Garry Deeks | 447 | 16.5 | ▲9.5 |
| Green | Libbi Meade | 227 | 8.4 | ▲8.4 |
| Liberal Democrats | Jon James | 138 | 5.1 | ▼31.2 |
| Majority | | 572 | 21.1 | ▲0.5 |
| Turnout | | 2,719 | 36.9 | ▼9.4 |
| Conservative hold | | Swing | ▼17.9 | |

Stowmarket North and Stowupland
| Party | Candidate | Votes | % | ±% |
|---|---|---|---|---|
| Conservative | Gary Green * | 830 | 36.1 | ▼9.9 |
| UKIP | Colin Lay | 586 | 25.5 | ▲25.5 |
| Labour | Duncan Macpherson | 458 | 19.9 | ▲10.0 |
| Green | Nigel Rozier | 354 | 15.4 | ▼6.4 |
| Liberal Democrats | Brij Sharma | 69 | 3.0 | ▼19.3 |
| Majority | | 244 | 10.6 | ▼13.1 |
| Turnout | | 2,298 | 25.0 | ▼7.2 |
| Conservative hold | | Swing | ▼17.7 | |

Stowmarket South
| Party | Candidate | Votes | % | ±% |
|---|---|---|---|---|
| UKIP | Stephen Searle | 578 | 25.6 | ▲9.5 |
| Conservative | Anne Whybrow * | 577 | 25.6 | ▼7.1 |
| Liberal Democrats | Keith Scarff | 538 | 23.8 | ▼6.1 |
| Labour | Suzanne Britton | 314 | 13.9 | ▲4.8 |
| Green | Linda Baxter | 251 | 11.1 | ▼1.1 |
| Majority | | 1 | 0.0 | |
| Turnout | | 2,260 | 30.2 | ▼6.3 |
| UKIP gain from Conservative | | Swing | ▲8.3 | |

Thedwastre North
| Party | Candidate | Votes | % | ±% |
|---|---|---|---|---|
| Conservative | Jane Storey * | 1,190 | 47.5 | ▼5.8 |
| UKIP | Ryan Fiske | 626 | 25.0 | ▲25.0 |
| Green | Alex Browne | 309 | 12.3 | ▲12.3 |
| Labour | James Grime | 271 | 10.8 | ▲3.4 |
| Liberal Democrats | Ann Gath | 111 | 4.4 | ▼19.0 |
| Majority | | 564 | 22.5 | ▼7.4 |
| Turnout | | 2,508 | 31.3 | ▼11.0 |
| Conservative hold | | Swing | ▼15.4 | |

Thedwastre South
| Party | Candidate | Votes | % | ±% |
|---|---|---|---|---|
| Liberal Democrats | Penny Otton * | 722 | 29.2 | ▼8.1 |
| Conservative | Sam Powell | 684 | 27.7 | ▼8.6 |
| UKIP | Gillian Bush | 647 | 26.2 | ▲26.2 |
| Green | Ella Copeland | 229 | 9.3 | ▼12.8 |
| Labour | Jeanie Kemp | 192 | 7.8 | ▲3.4 |
| Majority | | 38 | 1.5 | ▲0.5 |
| Turnout | | 2,477 | 35.3 | ▼13.0 |
| Liberal Democrats hold | | Swing | ▲0.3 | |

Thredling
| Party | Candidate | Votes | % | ±% |
|---|---|---|---|---|
| Conservative | Matthew Hicks | 1,293 | 49.5 | ▼13.3 |
| UKIP | Christopher Stockings | 555 | 21.2 | ▲21.2 |
| Green | Nicholas Hardingham | 368 | 14.1 | ▲14.1 |
| Labour | James Higgins | 249 | 9.5 | ▲2.9 |
| Liberal Democrats | Martin Redbond | 149 | 5.7 | ▼24.9 |
| Majority | | 738 | 28.2 | ▼4.0 |
| Turnout | | 2,630 | 35.2 | ▼10.7 |
| Conservative hold | | Swing | ▼17.3 | |

Upper Gipping
| Party | Candidate | Votes | % | ±% |
|---|---|---|---|---|
| Green | Andrew Stringer * | 1,536 | 53.1 | ▲2.4 |
| Conservative | Kevin Welsby | 596 | 20.6 | ▼16.3 |
| UKIP | Roger Fouracre | 571 | 19.7 | ▲19.7 |
| Labour | Terry Wilson | 154 | 5.3 | ▲0.2 |
| Liberal Democrats | Kay Field | 35 | 1.2 | ▼6.1 |
| Majority | | 940 | 32.5 | ▲18.7 |
| Turnout | | 2,894 | 38.3 | ▼10.4 |
| Green hold | | Swing | ▲9.6 | |

=== Suffolk Coastal ===
District summary

| Party | Seats | +/- | Votes | % | +/- |
|---|---|---|---|---|---|
| Conservative | 12 | Steady | 19,860 | 49.0 | ▼2.7 |
| Liberal Democrat | 1 | Steady | 6,746 | 16.6 | ▼14.8 |
| Labour | 0 | Steady | 8,463 | 20.9 | ▲9.6 |
| UKIP | 0 | Steady | 3,337 | 8.2 | ▲8.2 |
| Green | 0 | Steady | 1,424 | 3.5 | ▼1.6 |
| Independent | 0 | Steady | 703 | 1.7 | ▲1.4 |

Division results

Aldeburgh and Leiston
| Party | Candidate | Votes | % | ±% |
|---|---|---|---|---|
| Conservative | Richard Smith * | 1,031 | 39.6 | ▼7.9 |
| Independent | Tony Cooper | 703 | 27.0 | ▲27.0 |
| Labour | Terry Hodgson | 433 | 16.6 | ▲3.5 |
| Green | Marie Clark | 250 | 9.6 | ▼5.3 |
| Liberal Democrats | Paul Jackman-Graham | 188 | 7.2 | ▼17.3 |
| Majority | | 328 | 12.6 | ▼10.4 |
| Turnout | | 2,605 | 35.0 | ▼5.4 |
| Registered electors | | 7,429 | | |
| Conservative hold | | Swing | ▼17.4 | |

Blything
| Party | Candidate | Votes | % | ±% |
|---|---|---|---|---|
| Conservative | Michael Gower | 1,191 | 47.8 | ▲5.5 |
| Labour Co-op | Anne Thomas | 483 | 19.4 | ▲12.6 |
| Liberal Democrats | Marian Andrews | 426 | 17.1 | ▼15.8 |
| Green | Joe Cassels | 391 | 15.7 | ▲3.5 |
| Majority | | 708 | 28.4 | ▲19.0 |
| Turnout | | 2,491 | 36.0 | ▼10.5 |
| Registered electors | | 7,047 | | |
| Conservative hold | | Swing | ▼3.5 | |

Carlford
| Party | Candidate | Votes | % | ±% |
|---|---|---|---|---|
| Conservative | Peter Bellfield * | 1,565 | 59.0 | ▼7.3 |
| UKIP | Leon Stedman | 504 | 19.0 | ▲19.0 |
| Labour Co-op | Edna Salmon | 374 | 14.1 | ▲6.9 |
| Liberal Democrats | Victor Harrup | 208 | 7.9 | ▼18.6 |
| Majority | | 1,061 | 40.0 | ▲0.1 |
| Turnout | | 2,651 | 38.0 | ▼10.3 |
| Registered electors | | 6,933 | | |
| Conservative hold | | Swing | ▼13.2 | |

Felixstowe Coastal (2)
| Party | Candidate | Votes | % | ±% |
|---|---|---|---|---|
| Conservative | Nick Barber * | 2,626 | 53.5 | ▲4.0 |
| Conservative | Graham Newman | 2,487 | | |
| Labour | Hattie Bennett | 1,294 | 26.4 | ▲14.3 |
| Labour | Brenda Shelley | 1,142 | | |
| Liberal Democrats | Seamus Bennett | 985 | 20.1 | ▼18.3 |
| Liberal Democrats | Cherrie MacGregor | 900 | | |
| Majority | | 1,332 | 27.2 | ▲16.1 |
| Turnout | | 4,905 | 32.0 | ▼8.9 |
| Registered electors | | 15,342 | | |
| Conservative hold | | Swing | ▼5.1 | |
| Conservative hold | | Swing | | |

Felixstowe North and Trimley
| Party | Candidate | Votes | % | ±% |
|---|---|---|---|---|
| Conservative | John Goodwin * | 1,112 | 45.0 | ▲1.6 |
| Labour | David Rowe | 918 | 37.1 | ▲7.4 |
| Liberal Democrats | Michael Nimmey | 444 | 18.0 | ▲4.2 |
| Majority | | 194 | 7.8 | ▼5.9 |
| Turnout | | 2,474 | 33.0 | ▼9.7 |
| Registered electors | | 7,690 | | |
| Conservative hold | | Swing | ▼2.9 | |

Framlingham
| Party | Candidate | Votes | % | ±% |
|---|---|---|---|---|
| Conservative | Stephen Burroughes | 1,126 | 44.3 | ▼9.8 |
| UKIP | David Owen | 582 | 22.9 | ▲22.9 |
| Labour | Lesley Bensley | 358 | 14.1 | ▲6.3 |
| Green | Rachel Fulcher | 256 | 10.1 | ▼8.6 |
| Liberal Democrats | Andrew Houseley | 222 | 8.7 | ▼10.8 |
| Majority | | 544 | 21.4 | ▼13.1 |
| Turnout | | 2,544 | 37.0 | ▼11.3 |
| Registered electors | | 6,969 | | |
| Conservative hold | | Swing | ▼16.3 | |

Kesgrave and Rushmere St. Andrew (2)
| Party | Candidate | Votes | % | ±% |
|---|---|---|---|---|
| Conservative | Robert Whiting | 1,968 | 41.1 | ▼16.1 |
| Conservative | Christopher Hudson | 1,729 | | |
| UKIP | Frederick Rapsey | 1,369 | 28.6 | ▲28.6 |
| Labour | Kevin Archer | 973 | 20.3 | ▲6.4 |
| Labour | Matthew Percy | 770 | | |
| Liberal Democrats | Stephanie Fairbrother | 481 | 10.0 | ▼18.9 |
| Liberal Democrats | Derrick Fairbrother | 399 | | |
| Majority | | 599 | 12.5 | ▼15.8 |
| Turnout | | 4,791 | 28.0 | ▼6.4 |
| Registered electors | | 15,539 | | |
| Conservative hold | | Swing | ▼22.3 | |
| Conservative hold | | Swing | | |

Martlesham
| Party | Candidate | Votes | % | ±% |
|---|---|---|---|---|
| Conservative | Patricia O'Brien * | 1,600 | 50.5 | ▲2.1 |
| Liberal Democrats | John Kelso | 709 | 22.4 | ▼11.9 |
| Labour | Andrew Cortson | 456 | 14.4 | ▲8.7 |
| Green | Betsy Reid | 405 | 12.8 | ▲1.0 |
| Majority | | 891 | 28.1 | ▲14.0 |
| Turnout | | 3,170 | 36.0 | ▼9.9 |
| Registered electors | | 8,894 | | |
| Conservative hold | | Swing | ▲7.0 | |

Wickham
| Party | Candidate | Votes | % | ±% |
|---|---|---|---|---|
| Conservative | Michael Bond * | 1,214 | 46.6 | ▼7.0 |
| UKIP | Alan Ryall | 555 | 21.3 | ▲21.3 |
| Labour | Jeremy Bale | 527 | 20.2 | ▲9.1 |
| Liberal Democrats | John Ball | 310 | 11.9 | ▼23.4 |
| Majority | | 659 | 25.3 | ▲7.1 |
| Turnout | | 2,606 | 32.0 | ▼9.5 |
| Registered electors | | 8,160 | | |
| Conservative hold | | Swing | ▼14.1 | |

Wilford
| Party | Candidate | Votes | % | ±% |
|---|---|---|---|---|
| Conservative | Andrew Reid * | 1,341 | 61.9 | ▲1.3 |
| Labour | Howard Needham | 480 | 22.1 | ▲12.8 |
| Liberal Democrats | Emma Greenhouse | 347 | 16.0 | ▼14.2 |
| Majority | | 861 | 39.7 | ▲9.3 |
| Turnout | | 2,168 | 33.0 | ▼15.9 |
| Registered electors | | 6,648 | | |
| Conservative hold | | Swing | ▼5.8 | |

Woodbridge
| Party | Candidate | Votes | % | ±% |
|---|---|---|---|---|
| Liberal Democrats | Caroline Page * | 1,127 | 41.7 | ▼5.5 |
| Conservative | Patti Mulcahy | 870 | 32.2 | ▼7.6 |
| UKIP | Pauline Staley | 327 | 12.1 | ▲12.1 |
| Labour | John White | 255 | 9.4 | ▲4.4 |
| Green | Rachel Smith-Lyte | 122 | 4.5 | ▼3.5 |
| Majority | | 257 | 9.5 | ▲2.1 |
| Turnout | | 2,701 | 42.0 | ▼6.9 |
| Registered electors | | 6,396 | | |
| Liberal Democrats hold | | Swing | ▲1.1 | |

=== St. Edmundsbury ===
District summary

| Party | Seats | +/- | Votes | % | +/- |
|---|---|---|---|---|---|
| Conservative | 6 | ▼2 | 12,373 | 37.5 | ▼10.4 |
| UKIP | 2 | ▲2 | 7,729 | 23.4 | ▲21.0 |
| Independent | 2 | ▲1 | 3,642 | 11.0 | ▲0.8 |
| Green | 1 | Steady | 2,011 | 6.1 | ▲1.0 |
| Labour | 0 | Steady | 5,920 | 17.9 | ▲6.3 |
| Liberal Democrat | 0 | ▼1 | 1,367 | 4.1 | ▼16.8 |

Division results

Blackbourn
| Party | Candidate | Votes | % | ±% |
|---|---|---|---|---|
| Conservative | Joanna Spicer * | 1,565 | 53.2 | ▼5.6 |
| UKIP | Chas Coles | 892 | 30.3 | ▲30.3 |
| Labour | James MacPherson | 247 | 8.4 | ▲2.1 |
| Liberal Democrats | David Bradbury | 121 | 4.1 | ▼9.4 |
| Green | Richard Braybrooke | 118 | 4.0 | ▲4.0 |
| Majority | | 673 | 22.9 | ▼14.6 |
| Turnout | | 2,943 | 37.1 | ▼8.9 |
| Conservative hold | | Swing | ▼18.0 | |

Clare
| Party | Candidate | Votes | % | ±% |
|---|---|---|---|---|
| Conservative | Mary Evans | 1,579 | 46.3 | ▼9.6 |
| UKIP | Stuart Letten | 1,077 | 31.6 | ▲9.0 |
| Labour | Gary Stroud | 434 | 12.7 | ▲5.0 |
| Independent | Tony Gearing | 323 | 9.5 | ▲9.5 |
| Majority | | 502 | 14.7 | ▼18.5 |
| Turnout | | 3,413 | 40.0 | ▼9.0 |
| Conservative hold | | Swing | ▼9.3 | |

Eastgate and Moreton Hall
| Party | Candidate | Votes | % | ±% |
|---|---|---|---|---|
| Independent | Trevor Beckwith * | 860 | 39.8 | ▼7.7 |
| Conservative | Peter Thompson | 674 | 31.2 | ▼6.4 |
| UKIP | Mark Jones | 307 | 14.2 | ▲14.2 |
| Labour | Jonathan Hartley | 254 | 11.7 | ▲5.4 |
| Liberal Democrats | Mark Valladares | 68 | 3.1 | ▼5.6 |
| Majority | | 186 | 8.6 | ▼1.3 |
| Turnout | | 2,163 | 28.7 | ▼8.7 |
| Independent hold | | Swing | ▼0.7 | |

Hardwick
| Party | Candidate | Votes | % | ±% |
|---|---|---|---|---|
| Conservative | Sarah Stamp | 799 | 30.0 | ▲2.4 |
| Independent | Paul Hopfensperger | 737 | 27.7 | ▼1.1 |
| UKIP | David Hussell | 495 | 18.6 | ▲18.6 |
| Labour | Shirley Stephenson | 325 | 12.2 | ▲5.9 |
| Liberal Democrats | Chris Lale | 305 | 11.5 | ▼25.7 |
| Majority | | 62 | 2.3 | ▼6.1 |
| Turnout | | 2,661 | 38.6 | ▼5.0 |
| Conservative gain from Liberal Democrats | | Swing | ▲14.0 | |

Haverhill Cangle (2)
| Party | Candidate | Votes | % | ±% |
|---|---|---|---|---|
| Conservative | Anne Gower * | 1,269 | 34.5 | ▼15.6 |
| UKIP | Julian Flood | 1,098 | 29.8 | ▲29.8 |
| Labour | Maureen Byrne | 1,082 | 29.3 | ▲8.2 |
| Conservative | Karen Richardson | 1,082 | | |
| Labour | Pat Hanlon | 876 | | |
| Liberal Democrats | Mick Graham | 239 | 6.5 | ▼22.4 |
| Majority | | 16 | 3.0 | ▼18.0 |
| Turnout | | 3,688 | 23.5 | ▼5.0 |
| Conservative hold | | Swing | ▼22.7 | |
| UKIP gain from Conservative | | Swing | | |

Haverhill East and Kedington
| Party | Candidate | Votes | % | ±% |
|---|---|---|---|---|
| UKIP | Tony Brown | 788 | 39.2 | ▲39.2 |
| Conservative | Alaric Pugh | 504 | 25.0 | ▼32.6 |
| Labour | Roger André | 431 | 21.4 | ▲5.6 |
| Liberal Democrats | Ken Rolph | 235 | 11.7 | ▼14.9 |
| Independent | Gordon Cox | 55 | 2.7 | ▲2.7 |
| Majority | | 284 | 14.1 | ▼17.0 |
| Turnout | | 2,013 | 28.4 | ▼3.0 |
| UKIP gain from Conservative | | Swing | ▲35.9 | |

Thingoe North
| Party | Candidate | Votes | % | ±% |
|---|---|---|---|---|
| Conservative | Beccy Hopfensperger * | 1,360 | 53.7 | ▼4.8 |
| UKIP | Linda Redford | 506 | 20.0 | ▲20.0 |
| Independent | Susan Glossop | 278 | 11.0 | ▲11.0 |
| Labour | Brian Turnbull | 216 | 8.5 | ▲1.5 |
| Green | Natasha Ereira-Guyer | 173 | 6.8 | ▲6.8 |
| Majority | | 854 | 33.7 | ▲9.8 |
| Turnout | | 2,533 | 33.0 | ▼6.3 |
| Conservative hold | | Swing | ▼12.4 | |

Thingoe South
| Party | Candidate | Votes | % | ±% |
|---|---|---|---|---|
| Conservative | Terry Clements * | 1,306 | 49.8 | ▼13.4 |
| UKIP | Bill Attwood | 760 | 29.0 | ▲29.0 |
| Labour | Jan Lavender | 320 | 12.2 | ▲2.2 |
| Green | Ritchie Tennant | 239 | 9.1 | ▲9.1 |
| Majority | | 546 | 20.8 | ▼15.4 |
| Turnout | | 2,625 | 36.6 | ▼9.6 |
| Conservative hold | | Swing | ▼21.2 | |

Tower (2)
| Party | Candidate | Votes | % | ±% |
|---|---|---|---|---|
| Green | Mark Ereira-Guyer * | 1,481 | 23.2 | ▼3.9 |
| Independent | David Nettleton | 1,389 | 21.8 | ▼4.2 |
| Conservative | Robert Everitt | 1,227 | 19.3 | ▼9.5 |
| Conservative | Patsy Warby | 1,008 | | |
| UKIP | Luke Levene | 983 | 15.4 | ▲15.4 |
| Labour | Diane Hind | 895 | 14.0 | ▲5.0 |
| Labour | Nicola Ridgeway | 840 | | |
| UKIP | James Lumley | 823 | | |
| Liberal Democrats | Judy Roadway | 399 | 6.3 | ▼2.8 |
| Majority | | 162 | 1.4 | ▼0.3 |
| Turnout | | 6,374 | 29.6 | ▼5.5 |
| Green hold | | Swing | ▲0.2 | |
| Independent gain from Conservative | | Swing | ▲2.7 | |

=== Waveney ===
District summary

| Party | Seats | ▲/- | Votes | % | ▲/- |
|---|---|---|---|---|---|
| Conservative | 5 | ▼7 | 15,189 | 32.2 | ▼6.7 |
| Labour | 5 | ▲5 | 14,762 | 31.3 | ▲10.7 |
| UKIP | 3 | ▲2 | 10,376 | 22.0 | ▲13.0 |
| Green | 0 | Steady | 5,364 | 11.4 | ▼5.9 |
| Liberal Democrat | 0 | Steady | 1,525 | 3.2 | ▼11.2 |

Division results

Beccles (2)
| Party | Candidate | Votes | % | ±% |
|---|---|---|---|---|
| Conservative | Mark Bee * | 1,822 | 35.7 | ▼6.1 |
| Conservative | Chris Punt * | 1,449 | | |
| Green | Graham Elliott | 1,322 | 25.9 | ▼4.5 |
| Labour | Barry Buckley | 973 | 19.1 | ▲3.7 |
| Green | Sue Bergin | 918 | | |
| Labour | Stuart Foulger | 868 | | |
| UKIP | Harry Ashbee | 856 | 16.8 | ▲16.8 |
| Liberal Democrats | Alison Briggs | 135 | 2.6 | ▼9.8 |
| Liberal Democrats | Doug Farmer | 111 | | |
| Majority | | 500 | 9.8 | ▼1.5 |
| Turnout | | 5,108 | 37.7 | ▼2.2 |
| Conservative hold | | Swing | ▼0.8 | |
| Conservative hold | | Swing | | |

Bungay
| Party | Candidate | Votes | % | ±% |
|---|---|---|---|---|
| Conservative | David Ritchie * | 1,150 | 45.2 | ▼4.4 |
| Green | Simon Thompson | 756 | 29.7 | ▲8.2 |
| Labour | Declan Keiley | 440 | 17.3 | ▲3.7 |
| Liberal Democrats | Dave O`Neill | 197 | 7.8 | ▼7.5 |
| Majority | | 394 | 15.5 | ▼12.6 |
| Turnout | | 2,543 | 35.6 | ▼6.3 |
| Conservative hold | | Swing | -6.3 | |

Gunton (2 Seats)
| Party | Candidate | Votes | % | ±% |
|---|---|---|---|---|
| Labour | Keith Patience | 1,579 | 38.3 | ▲10.6 |
| Labour | Janet Craig | 1,570 | | |
| Conservative | Mary Rudd * | 1,055 | 25.6 | ▼10.6 |
| UKIP | Paul Newbery | 1,049 | 25.4 | ▲25.4 |
| UKIP | Penny Hackett | 1,033 | | |
| Conservative | Deanna Law | 970 | | |
| Green | Emma Bateman | 279 | 6.8 | ▼13.4 |
| Green | Peter Eyres | 246 | | |
| Liberal Democrats | Steven Taylor | 163 | 4.0 | ▼12.1 |
| Majority | | 515 | 12.7 | ▲4.3 |
| Turnout | | 4,125 | 27.8 | ▼3.1 |
| Labour gain from Conservative | | Swing | ▲10.6 | |
| Labour gain from Conservative | | | | |

Halesworth
| Party | Candidate | Votes | % | ±% |
|---|---|---|---|---|
| Conservative | Tony Goldson * | 1,350 | 53.2 | ▲1.2 |
| Labour | Toby Walton | 700 | 27.6 | ▲13.5 |
| Green | Jen Berry | 374 | 14.7 | ▼4.4 |
| Liberal Democrats | Janet Blowers O`Neill | 116 | 4.6 | ▼10.3 |
| Majority | | 650 | 25.6 | ▼7.2 |
| Turnout | | 2,540 | 35.5 | ▼5.5 |
| Conservative hold | | Swing | ▼6.2 | |

Kessingland and Southwold
| Party | Candidate | Votes | % | ±% |
|---|---|---|---|---|
| Conservative | Michael Ladd | 1,027 | 37.6 | ▼4.4 |
| UKIP | Jack Tyler | 859 | 31.5 | ▲4.0 |
| Labour | Alan Green | 592 | 21.7 | ▲10.2 |
| Green | Emma Waller | 179 | 6.6 | ▼1.6 |
| Liberal Democrats | John Marsden | 74 | 2.7 | ▼8.3 |
| Majority | | 168 | 6.2 | ▼8.3 |
| Turnout | | 2,731 | 37.2 | ▼5.0 |
| Conservative hold | | Swing | ▼4.2 | |

Lowestoft South (2)
| Party | Candidate | Votes | % | ±% |
|---|---|---|---|---|
| UKIP | Derek Hackett | 1,410 | 35.5 | ▲9.4 |
| UKIP | Bill Mountford * | 1,406 | | |
| Labour | Ian Graham | 1,338 | 33.7 | ▲13.6 |
| Labour | Nick Webb | 1,326 | | |
| Conservative | Trish Mortimer | 798 | 20.1 | ▼3.7 |
| Conservative | May Reader | 710 | | |
| Green | Tom Hammond | 211 | 5.3 | ▼6.1 |
| Liberal Democrats | Brian Howe | 210 | 5.3 | ▼13.2 |
| Liberal Democrats | Sandra Tonge | 178 | | |
| Green | Steven Nichols | 170 | | |
| Majority | | 72 | 14.5 | ▼0.4 |
| Turnout | | 3,967 | 27.5 | ▼27.6 |
| UKIP gain from Conservative | | Swing | ▲6.5 | |
| UKIP hold | | Swing | ▼2.1 | |

Oulton (2)
| Party | Candidate | Votes | % | ±% |
|---|---|---|---|---|
| UKIP | Bert Poole | 1,650 | 31.4 | ▲6.4 |
| Labour | Leonard Jacklin | 1,540 | 29.3 | ▲8.4 |
| Conservative | Mike Barnard * | 1,475 | 28.0 | ▼8.7 |
| Labour | Susan Collins | 1,428 | | |
| Conservative | Colin Law * | 1,379 | | |
| Green | Maxine Narburgh | 378 | 7.2 | ▼1.4 |
| Green | John Nixon | 228 | | |
| Liberal Democrats | Michelle Lavill | 220 | 2.7 | ▼4.2 |
| Majority | | 110 | 2.1 | ▼9.7 |
| Turnout | | 5,263 | 30.6 | ▼3.7 |
| UKIP gain from Conservative | | Swing | ▲7.6 | |
| Labour gain from Conservative | | Swing | ▲8.5 | |

Pakefield (2)
| Party | Candidate | Votes | % | ±% |
|---|---|---|---|---|
| Labour | Sonia Barker | 1,214 | 33.7 | ▲9.6 |
| Labour | Peter Byatt | 1,194 | | |
| UKIP | Jamie Brown | 1,095 | 30.4 | ▲30.4 |
| UKIP | Darius McCormack | 1,018 | | |
| Conservative | Kathy Gosling * | 1,012 | 28.1 | ▼13.6 |
| Conservative | Frank Mortimer | 992 | | |
| Green | George Langley | 165 | 4.6 | ▼13.7 |
| Green | Douglas Hoffman | 138 | | |
| Liberal Democrats | Adam Robertson | 121 | 3.4 | ▼12.7 |
| Majority | | 119 | 5.6 | ▼12.0 |
| Turnout | | 3,607 | 30.8 | ▼3.8 |
| Labour gain from Conservative | | Swing | ▲11.6 | |
| Labour gain from Conservative | | | | |
