= Stowmarket Guncotton Explosion =

1871 industrial disaster in Suffolk, England

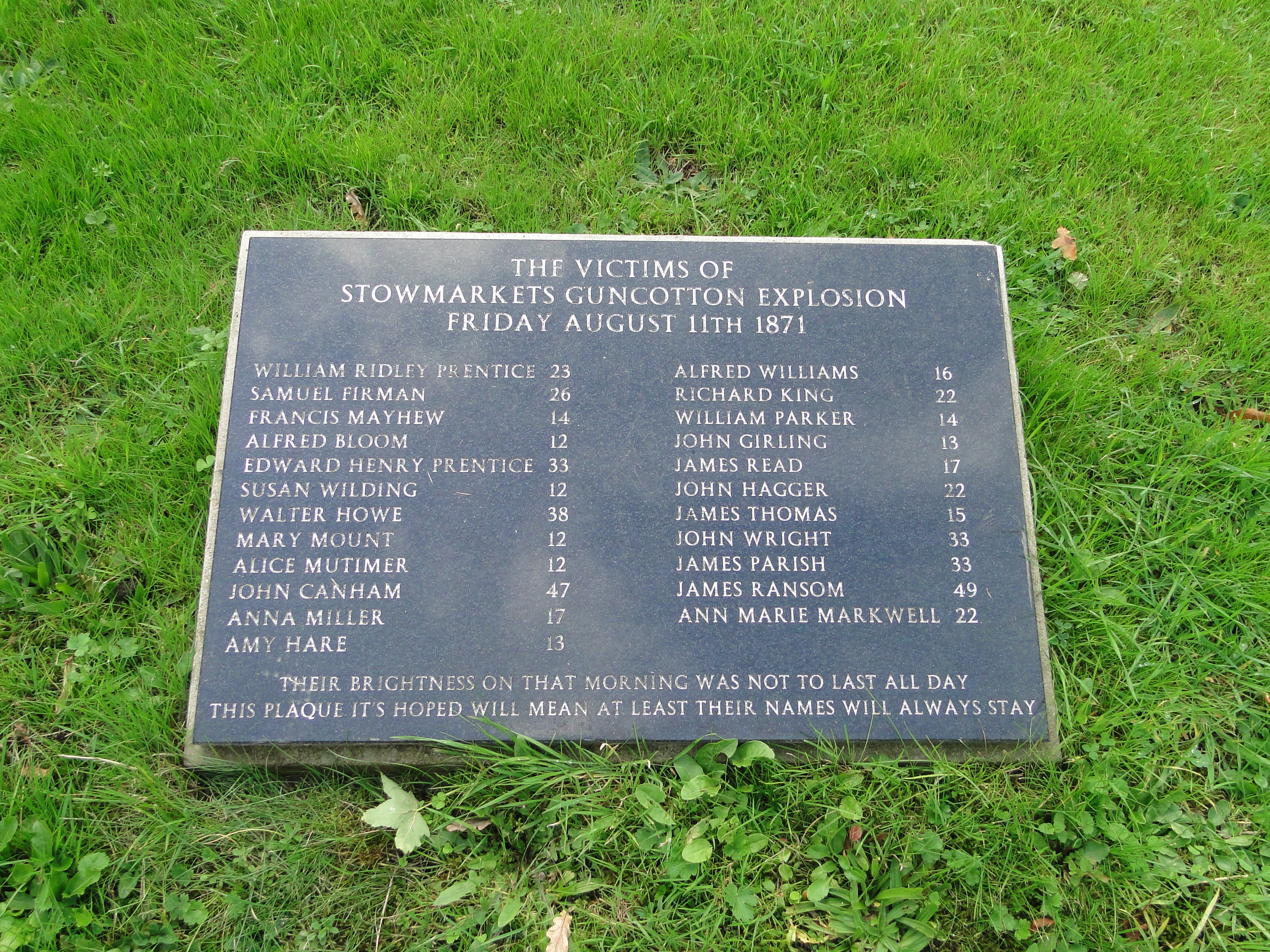
- The 2014 memorial at Stowmarket Old Cemetery
- Date: 11 August 1871; 155 years ago
- Time: 14:05
- Venue: Prentices Guncotton Factory
- Location: Stowmarket, Suffolk, England; 52.182152°N 1.008327°E
- Type: Nitrocellulose explosions
- Deaths: 28
- Injuries: ≈ 70

The Stowmarket Guncotton Explosion happened on 11 August 1871 at the Prentices Guncotton Factory (Note: The company changed names a number of times, but the factory was under the control of Patent Safety Gun-Cotton Company at the time of the explosion.) in Stowmarket, Suffolk. It was blown up by two massive explosions in the factory which killed 28 people and injured approximately 70 more.

== Background ==
In the mid-19th century, Guncotton began to be produced as a replacement for gun powder as propellant in firearms and a low-order explosive in mining. Even before the explosion at Stowmarket some earlier factories that produced it discontinued production due to the volatility of the substance during manufacture.

Sir Frederick Abel developed a manufacturing process that eliminated the impurities in nitrocellulose making it safer to produce and a stable product that was safer to handle, and this process was used at the Stowmarket factory. A previous accident taking the lives of two or three people had occurred in 1864.

== The explosions ==
The two explosions occurred on a Friday afternoon when approximately 130 employees were on site. Approximately ten tons of guncotton were stored in the three magazines at one end of the works. The first, largest explosion occurred at the magazines shortly after 2 pm (Note: Sources state 14:05 and 14:10) after the workers returned from lunch. Between the explosions much of the site was on fire and people, including the Prentices, attempted to move undamaged boxes of guncotton away from the fire to prevent further explosions. The second explosion occurred at approximately 3 pm in the packing sheds; a third explosion immediately followed in another packing shed. The flames were visible for miles.

The noise of the explosion was reportedly so loud that it rattled the windows in Diss, approximately 17 miles away and Southwold 30 miles away. The impact created a chasm in the ground nearly 100 feet (30 m) in diameter, and uprooted trees and the nearby railway line. It was reported to have caused over 188 cases of deafness. Telegrams requesting assistance were sent across the county including to Ipswich. Five fire engines attended the scene and by midnight the fire was under control and a search for the missing persons began.

Due to the proximity of the factory to the town, properties were damaged across the area, notably in a largely residential area of Stowmarket called California (Note: Streets in this area include Bridge Street and Lime Tree Place.) that was particularly close to the factory. A number of people were blown into the River Gipping that passed through and was used by the factory.

== The victims and memorial ==
Two members of the Prentice family, which owned the factory, William Ridley Prentice (1847–1871) and Edward Henry Prentice (1838–1871) were included in the list of the dead, and killed in the second explosion at approximately 3 pm. Accounts from the time indicated that they were dismembered in the explosions and almost beyond identification.

Of the dead, 23 were buried in the town's old cemetery the other 5 in their respective Parish. Many of the dead were children and young adults, and most were employed by the company. Many of the dead were not given a memorial at the time, and there were reports of the Suffolk council downplaying the number of fatalities. However, there is now a small memorial at Stowmarket Old Cemetery that was created in 2014 and details the 23 who were buried there. Approximately 70 people were injured.

Those known to have died include (age at time of death in parentheses):

- Alfred Bloom (12)
- Mary Ann Mount (12)
- Alice Mutimer (12)
- Susan Wilding (12)
- Amy Hare (13)
- John Girling (13)
- Francis Mayhew (14)
- William Parker (14)
- James Thomas (15)
- Alfred Williams (16)
- Anna Miller (17)
- James Read (17)
- Richard King (22)
- John Hagger (22)
- Ann Marie Markwell (22)
- William Ridley Prentice (23)
- Samuel Firman (26)
- Edward Henry Prentice (33)
- James Parish (33)
- John Wright (33)
- Walter Howe (38)
- John Canham (47)
- James Ransom (49)
- J. Gallants (Note: They were buried within their respective parish and are not named on the 2014 memorial.)
- J. Runnacles

== Aftermath and legacy ==
From 12 August to 6 September an inquest into the event was held at the County Court over eight sittings. Thousands of people visited the scene of the explosion in the subsequent days. The UK Government issued an order with a reward of £100 to find out the cause. No one was ever prosecuted for the event. There was also an enquiry by the Government's Chief Inspector of Explosives, Vivian Dering Majendie.

The cause was probably several tons of gun cotton combusting due to the summer heat (Note: Though properly, washed, dried and treated gun cotton is supposed to combust at a temperature of 300 °F (149 °C).) and the poor standards of hygiene, as well as a blatant disregard for health and safety. The process of producing guncotton includes washing away acids used in an earlier part of its production and drying, and the product becomes 'safer' to handle at various stages of its manufacture; the inquest indicated that the "adding of sulphuric acid to the gun cotton subsequent to its passing the tests required by Government" was a cause of the event. It also concluded that "gun cotton works should not be allowed near a town" and "gun cotton works should be subject to constant Government inspection".

After the explosion the factory was rebuilt to a different design in 1872. In the following years, government safety regulations increased, partly as a consequence of the explosion at Stowmarket. In the 20th century the factory diversified into lacquers and paints and moved away from explosives. Parts of the site are still used as paint factories operated by AkzoNobel and PPG Industries.

The Defence Science and Technology Laboratory notes the enquiry into the explosion led by Captain Vivian Dering Majendie as among the earliest work of what would later become known as their Forensic Explosives Laboratory.

== See also ==
- Stowmarket Guncotton Company
- Prentice Brothers Limited (Chemical Works)
