= Church of St Peter and St Mary, Stowmarket =

Coordinates: 52.1883°N 0.9964°E

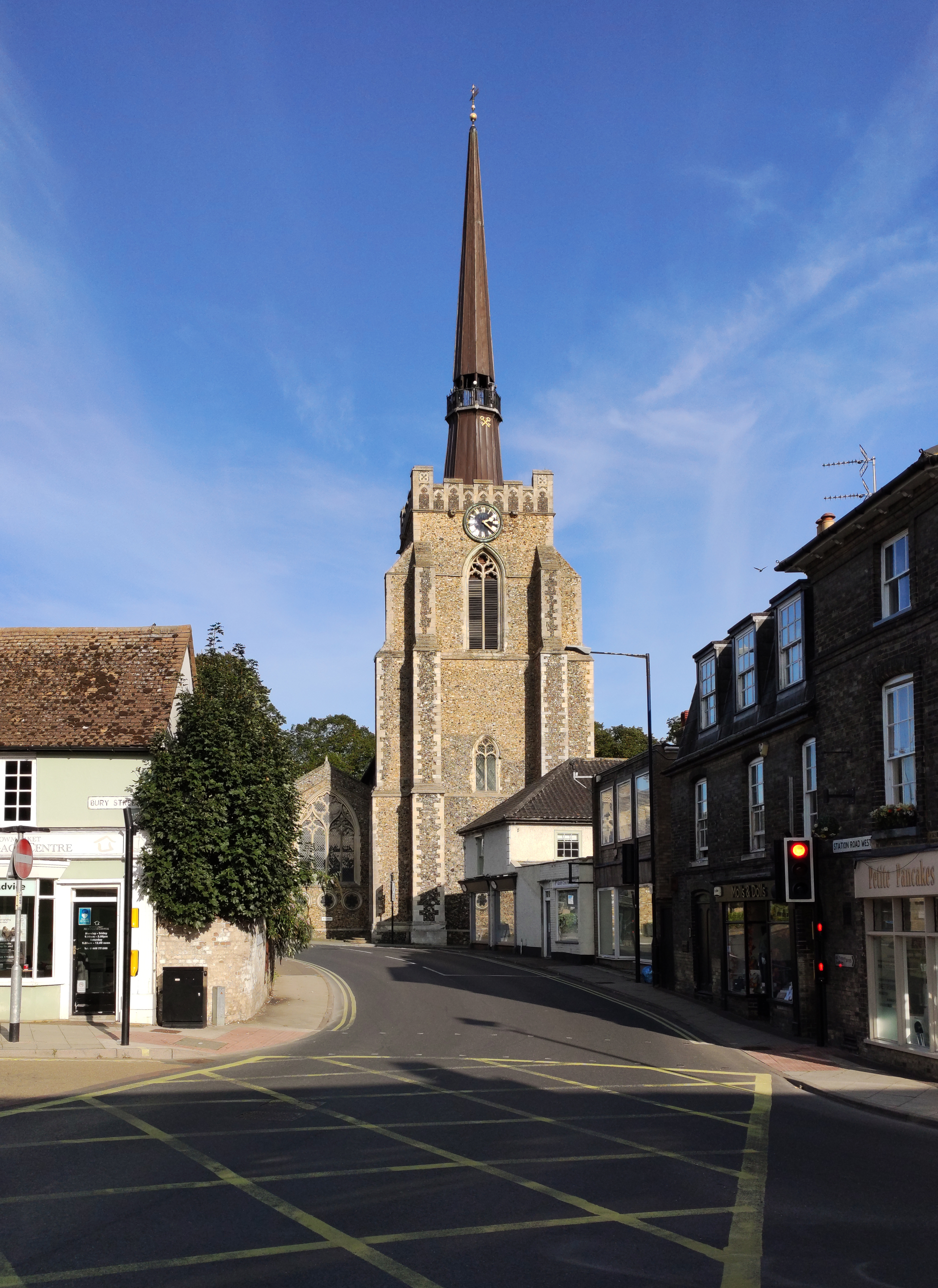
- The church from Station Road West

- Location in Suffolk
- Location: Stowmarket, Suffolk
- Country: England
- Denomination: Anglican
- Website: www.achurchnearyou.com/church/2087/

History
- Dedication: Saint Peter & Saint Mary

Architecture
- Functional status: Church of England parish church
- Heritage designation: Grade I
- Designated: 28 July 1950
- Architectural type: Church
- Style: Decorated Gothic
- Groundbreaking: 14th century

The Church of St Peter and St Mary stands in the town of Stowmarket, Suffolk, England. It is an active Church of England parish church in the Diocese of St Edmundsbury and Ipswich. The church dates from the 14th century and is a Grade I listed building.

== History ==
The Church of St Peter and St Mary dates from the 14th century. It stands at the centre of the medieval town and serves as its parish church. The double designation to Saint Peter and Saint Mary reflects a late-medieval amalgamation when the living of St Peter was combined with that of a separate church dedicated to St Mary. Tree-ring dating places timbers used in the spire of the church to the years 1362–1363. The main body of the church dates from this time, although the tower is later. The church was extensively restored during three separate renovations in the Victorian era. The spire has been replaced a number of times, most recently in 1994.

In the 17th century the vicar was Thomas Young, the tutor of John Milton. (Note: The garden of the former vicarage, now renamed Milton House, contains a Mulberry tree reputedly planted by Milton.) Young is buried in the church. The church contains memorials to residents of Stowmarket who died in the First and Second World Wars. In November 2000, the then vicar of St Peter and St Mary, was sentenced to 9 months imprisonment for embezzlement of church funds.

The church remains an active parish church and regular services are held.

== Architecture ==
The church is built of local flint with ashlar stone dressings. The tower is of four storeys with a crenellated parapet. The style is mainly Decorated Gothic. The interior was heavily restored by Richard Phipson, architect to the Diocese of Norwich, in the mid-19th century. James Bettley, in his 2015 revised Suffolk: West volume of the Pevsner Buildings of England series, notes the large number of memorials within the church to members of the Tyrrell family, local landowners. (Note: The Tyrrells were Lords of the Manor of Gipping, a hamlet just outside Stowmarket. A descendant, James Tyrrell, is reputed to have confessed to the murder of the Princes in the Tower.) The spire existed in Medieval times, it was replaced in 1674, destroyed in the Great storm of 1703, replaced in 1712 and removed due to its instability in 1975. A further timber replacement was installed in 1993–1994, which replicates the earlier structures in having an external gallery.

== Sources ==
- Bettley, James; Pevsner, Nikolaus (2015). Suffolk: West. The Buildings Of England. New Haven, US and London: Yale University Press. ISBN 978-0-300-19655-9.
