= Stowmarket Guncotton Company =

Defunct English explosives manufacturing company (1863–1907)

Coordinates: 52.182152°N 1.008327°E

- Company type: Limited company
- Industry: Chemicals
- Founded: 1863; 162 years ago in Stowmarket, England
- Founder: Messrs Thomas Prentice & Co
- Fate: Acquired by Nobel Enterprises (1907)
- Successor: ICI
- Products: Explosives; Paint
- Number of employees: 2000 (1918)

The Stowmarket Guncotton Company was an explosives company established in the 19th century by Messrs Prentice that operated a gun-cotton factory in Stowmarket, Suffolk, England. The factory was the scene of an explosion in 1871 that claimed the lives of 28 people.

== History ==
=== Establishment and explosion ===
Gun cotton was developed as an explosive in the mid-19th century and many of the initial factories discontinued production soon after due to the volatility of the substance during manufacture. British War Office chemist Sir Frederick Abel began thorough research at Waltham Abbey Royal Gunpowder Mills leading to a manufacturing process that eliminated the impurities in nitrocellulose making it safer to produce and a stable product safer to handle. Abel's patented method was used at the Stowmarket factory.

Thomas Prentice & Company began manufacturing guncotton in Stowmarket in c. 1863 at a newly built factory on the banks of the River Gipping. The Prentice family was prominent in Stowmarket at the time and operated a number of other businesses including a gasworks, corn and coal merchants, maltsters and a Chemical Works (producing fertiliser).

On 11 August 1871 an explosion destroyed the factory killing 28 people. The factory was under the control of Patent Safety Gun-Cotton Company at the time of the explosion.

=== Rebuilding and later history ===
After the explosion the factory was rebuilt in 1872 and the new company operated as the Stowmarket Guncotton Company, Ltd. In 1881 the company became The Explosives Company Limited after being sold by the Prentice family in 1880, and in 1885 it was again renamed as The New Explosives Company, Limited (NEC).

Between 1896 and 1898 the factory was again expanded and began to manufacture other explosives such as cordite. In the following years the factory expanded further partly due to government safety regulations and the introduction of more products including smokeless powder for shotguns, rifles and revolvers.

In 1907 the company was acquired by Nobel Explosives following a decline in the business from a price collapse in explosives. During World War I the factory made Stowmarket a target, and on 31 March 1916 was the intended destination for the German Zeppelin L13; it was hit with anti-aircraft fire prior to reaching the town and retreated.

In 1918 following the war demand for explosives again dropped and the factory began producing industrial lacquers and was again renamed as Necol Industrial Collodions Ltd. Nobel later merged with a number of other companies to form Imperial Chemical Industries (ICI) who continued to use the factory site. The cordite works, located on the east side of the railway line, became disused. In 1972 ICI invested in the Stowmarket site to create its "Premier Whites Plant".

=== Legacy ===
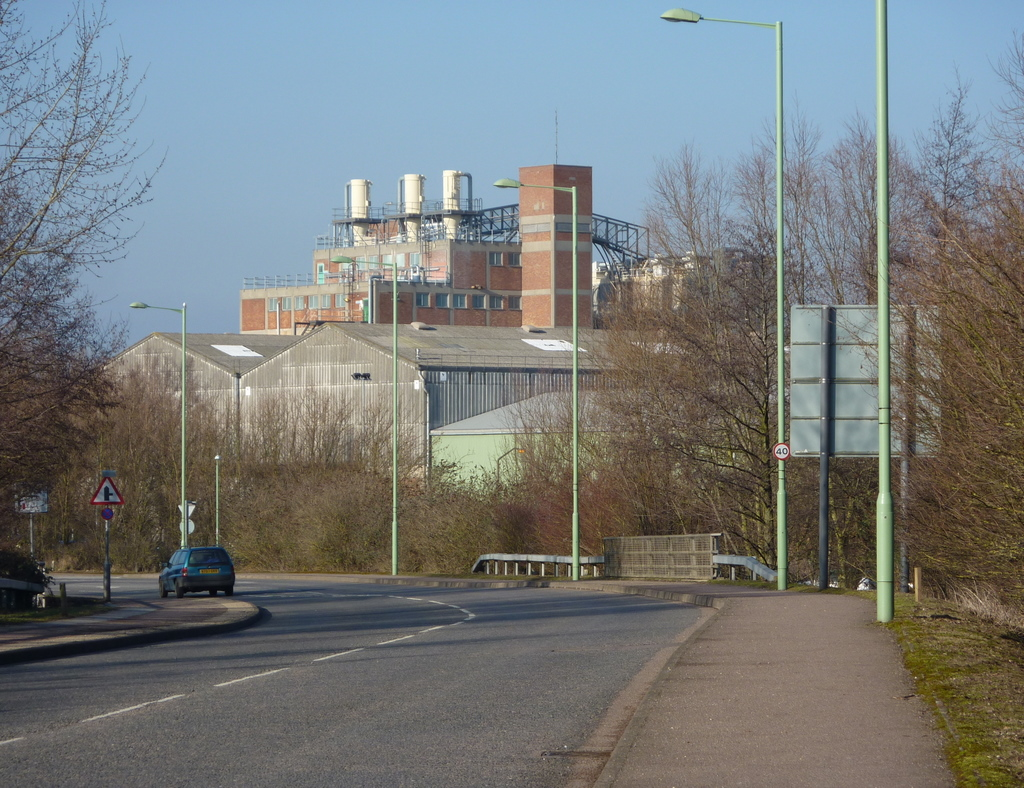
The ICI factory pictured in 2010.

Parts of the site are still currently used as paint factories operated by AkzoNobel (who acquired ICI) and PPG Industries. The AkzoNobel factory manufactures Dulux brand paint and the PPG site produces automotive paints.

The significance of the produce of the factory in the town has led to a street in a 21st-century-built housing estate near to the site of the factory to be named Gun Cotton Way.

== See also ==
- Prentice Brothers Limited
