= Vivian Dering Majendie =

British engineer and bomb disposal pioneer

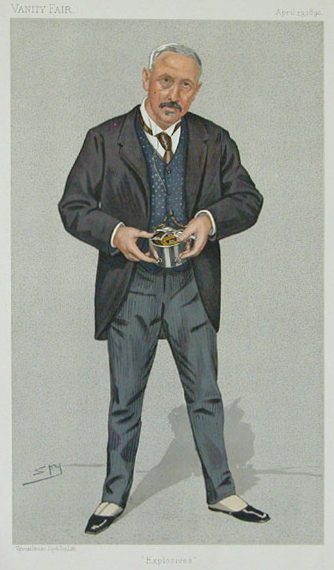
Majendie as caricatured by "Spy" in 1892

Colonel Sir Vivian Dering Majendie, KCB (18 July 1836 – 25 March 1898) was a British engineer who was one of the first bomb disposal experts. He served as chief inspector of explosives to Queen Victoria from 1871 until his death in 1898.

== Biography ==
The son of Major John Routledge Majendie (1801–1850) and his wife, Harriet Mary Dering (1806–1893), and the grandson of Henry Majendie, the Bishop of Bangor, Vivian Majendie was educated at Leamington College before joining the Royal Artillery in 1854. Promoted to second lieutenant on 23 October 1854, he saw action during the Crimean War and the Indian Mutiny. From 1861 to 1871 Majendie served as captain instructor and assistant superintendent at the Royal Arsenal at Woolwich. In 1871 he was appointed chief inspector of explosives, a position he held until his death in 1898. He was the president of the Association of Mining Engineers and was one of the first bomb disposal experts.

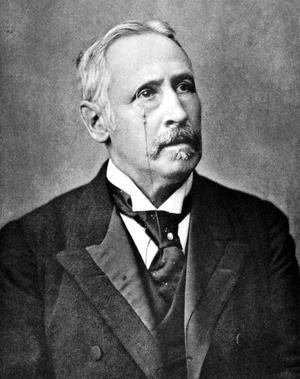
Colonel Majendie c. 1895

In 1871 Majendie led the enquiry into the Stowmarket Guncotton Explosion. As a major in the Royal Artillery, Majendie investigated an explosion on 2 October 1874 in the Regent's Canal when the barge Tilbury, carrying six barrels of petroleum and five tons of gunpowder, blew up, killing the crew and destroying Macclesfield Bridge and cages at nearby London Zoo. He was appointed a Companion of the Order of the Bath (CB) in 1875 for framing a bill which became the Explosives Act 1875, and a Knight Commander of the Order of the Bath in 1895. His advice during the Fenian dynamite campaign of 1881–1885 was officially recognised as having contributed to the saving of lives. After Victoria Station was bombed on 26 February 1884 he defused a bomb with a clockwork mechanism which might have gone off at any moment.

In October 1886 Majendie visited the United States to observe the petroleum industry there and to examine the regulations regarding storage and distribution of that product. A caricature of Majendie by Leslie Ward ("Spy") appeared in Vanity Fair on 23 April 1892. His publications included Up Among the Pandies (1859), Ammunition: A Descriptive Treatise on the Different Projectiles, Charges, Fuses, Rockets, &c. (1867), The Arms and Ammunition of the British Service (1868), and The Official Guide to the Explosives Act (1877).

Majendie married Adelaide Frances Grylls (1841–1868) and had two children, Annie Shadwell Majendie (1864–1874) and Captain Henry Grylls Majendie (1865–1900); the latter was killed during the Boer War while serving with the Rifle Brigade.

Vivian Dering Majendie died of heart failure in 1898 while visiting his sister in Oxford. His funeral was at St Paul's Cathedral and he was buried with Adelaide and Annie at Charlton Cemetery on 29 April. There is a screen in his memory at St Luke's Church, Charlton.
