= Stowmarket (South) Ward =

Electoral ward of Mid Suffolk, England

The candidate information for the Stowmarket (South) Ward in Mid-Suffolk, Suffolk, England. This ward elects two councillors.

== Councillors ==
Election	Member	Party	Member	Party
2011	Gerard Brewster	Independent	Vera Waspe	Conservative
2015	Gerard Brewster	Independent	Nick Gowrley	Conservative
2019	Gerard Brewster	Independent	Keith Scarff	Liberal Democrats

=== 2019 Results ===
Stowmarket (South)
Party	Candidate	Votes	%
Independent	Gerard Brewster	893	38.3
Liberal Democrats	Keith Scarff	557	23.8
Conservative	Nicholas Gowrley	443	18.9
Green	Miles Row	443	18.9
Majority			
Turnout		1,458	30.5
Independent win (new seat)			
Liberal Democrats win (new seat)			

== 2011 Results ==
Candidate name:	Party:	Votes:	% of votes:
Brewster, Gerard	Independent	480	18.65
Waspe, Vera	Conservative	468	18.18
Scarff, Keith	Liberal Democrat	403	15.66
Davis, Twiggy	Green	366	14.22
Whybrow, Ann	Conservative	345	13.40
Izod, Jeremy	Labour	254	9.87
Vecchi, Christopher	Liberal Democrat	150	5.83
Streatfield, Christopher	UK Independence	108	4.20

== 2015 Results ==
The turnout of the election was 63.58%.

Candidate name:	Party name:	Votes:	% of votes:
Gerard BREWSTER	Independent	934	26.81
Nick GOWRLEY	Conservative	856	24.57
Keith SCARFF	Liberal Democrat	768	22.04
Stewart MINNS	UKIP	574	16.48
Jen OVERETT	Green	352	10.10

== See also ==
- Mid Suffolk local elections
