= River Rat =

River in Suffolk, England

Rat Rattlesden River
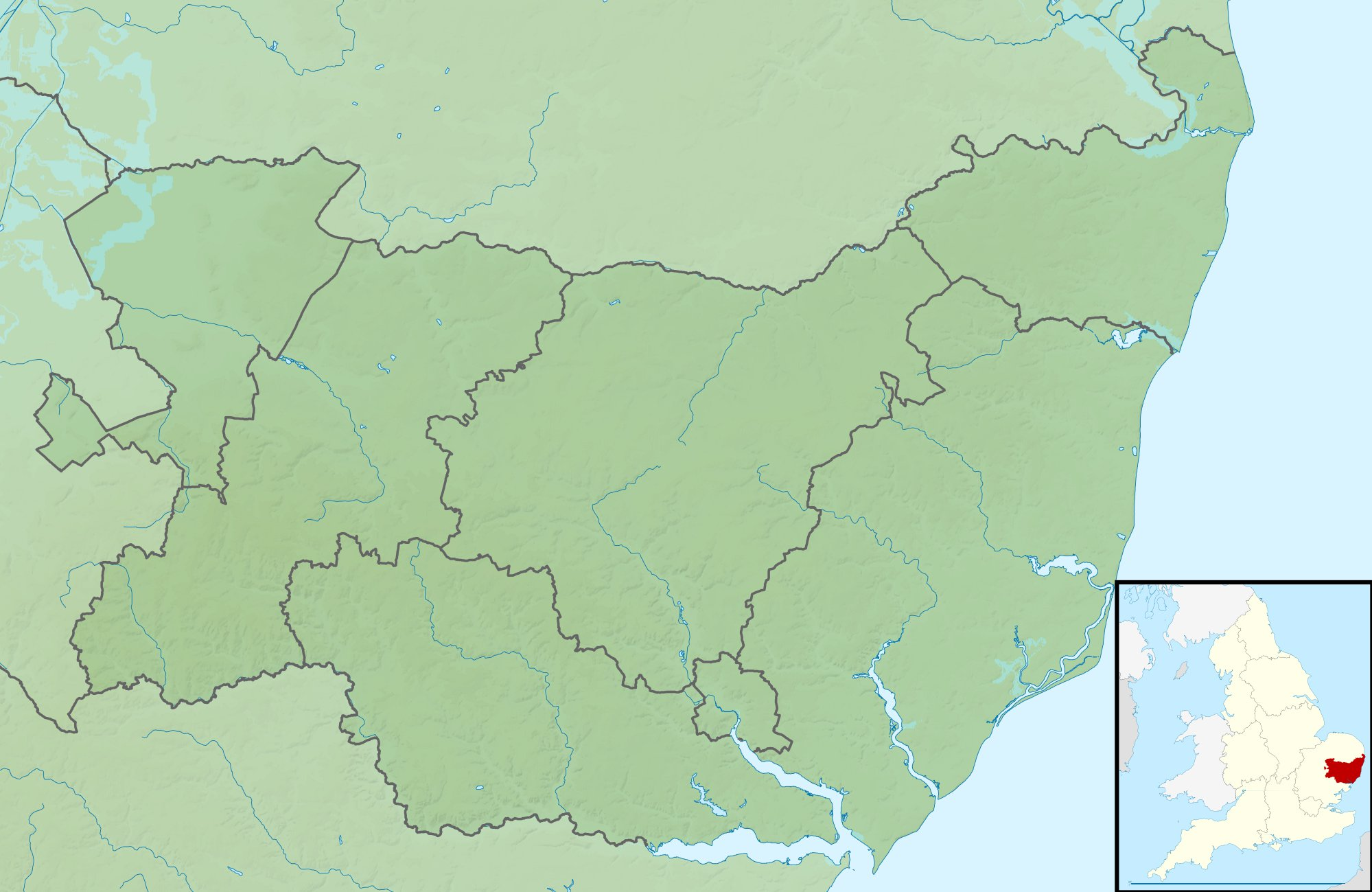
- Location of the river mouth within Suffolk

Location
- Country: England
- Region: Suffolk

Physical characteristics
- Source
  - location: Felsham
  - coordinates: 52.1663°N 0.8486°E
  - elevation: 80 m (260 ft)
- Mouth
  - location: Stowmarket
  - coordinates: 52.1822°N 1.0071°E
  - elevation: 26 m (85 ft)
- Length: 15.5 km (9.6 mi)

Basin features
- River system: River Gipping

The River Rat is a river in the county of Suffolk in East Anglia, England.

Its source is to the south of the village of Felsham, and is the major tributary of the River Gipping. The River Rat joins the River Gipping at Pikes Meadow in Stowmarket.

The river flows through the village of Rattlesden, and is also known as the Rattlesden River.
