= Thomas Young (Scottish theologian) =

Scottish theologian (d. 1655)

Thomas Young (c. 1587–1655) was a Scottish Presbyterian minister and theologian, resident in England and a member of the Westminster Assembly. He was the major author of the Smectymnuus group of leading Puritan churchmen. He was also Master of Jesus College, Cambridge, and is known as the tutor to John Milton from the age of about ten.

== Life ==
He was born in Perthshire, his father William Young being a vicar. He studied at St Andrews University, graduating M.A. in 1606. He then moved south to England.

In London, from before 1612, he worked as a teaching assistant to Thomas Gataker. He tutored Milton, possibly from 1618 to 1620 or 1622, and continued to correspond with him. He then took a position in Hamburg, as minister to English merchants there, returning to England in 1628. Between 1628 and 1655 Young was vicar at the church of St Peter and St Mary in Stowmarket and his portrait hangs on the south wall of the church nave.

He was the primary author of the pamphlet An Answer signed Smectymnuus, an answer to an anonymous publication defending episcopacy and in fact written by Joseph Hall. It sparked off several more publications.

He became a Westminster Assembly member in 1643, and Master of Jesus College, Cambridge in 1644. He was expelled as Master in 1650.

== Works ==
- Dies Dominica (1639)
- Hope's Incouragement pointed at (1644)
- Smectymnuus Redivivus (1669)

Academic offices
Preceded by Richard Sterne	Master of Jesus College, Cambridge; 1644–1655	Succeeded by John Worthington
