= 2011 Mid Suffolk District Council election =

2011 English local government election

- 5 May 2011

All 40 seats to Mid Suffolk District Council 21 seats needed for a majority

	First party	Second party	Third party
Party	Conservative	Liberal Democrats	Independent
Seats won	22	6	5
Seat change	Steady	▼4	▲1
Popular vote	19,897	10,072	2,602
Percentage	42.8%	21.6%	5.6%
Swing	▼4.1%	▼11.5%	▼0.4%
	Fourth party	Fifth party	Sixth party
Party	Green	Suffolk Together	Labour
Seats won	4	2	1
Seat change	▲2	Steady	▲1
Popular vote	5,417	1,474	5,520
Percentage	11.6%	3.2%	11.9%
Swing	▲7.6%	▼0.7%	▲7.4%
- Winner of each seat at the 2011 Mid Suffolk District Council election.
Control before election
Conservative
Control after election
Conservative

The 2011 Mid Suffolk District Council election took place on 5 May 2011 to elect members of Mid Suffolk District Council in Suffolk, England. This was on the same day as other local elections.

== Summary ==
=== Election result ===
The Conservatives won a third consecutive majority on the council. The Liberal Democrats lost four seats but remained in second place, while the Greens gained two seats. Labour regained representation on the council - winning one seat - after being wiped out at the previous election.

After the election, the four Green councillors formed a group including the two Suffolk Together councillors and two Independents. The group of eight formed the official opposition to the Conservative administration.

2011 Mid Suffolk District Council election
Party	Candidates	Seats	Gains	Losses	Net gain/loss	Seats %	Votes %	Votes	+/−
Conservative	32	22	2	2	Steady	55.0	42.8	19,897	–4.1
Liberal Democrats	31	6	0	4	▼4	15.0	21.6	10,072	–11.5
Independent	5	5	1	0	▲ !	12.5	5.6	2,602	–0.4
Green	17	4	2	0	▲2	10.0	11.6	5,417	+7.6
Suffolk Together	3	2	0	0	Steady	5.0	3.2	1,474	–0.7
Labour	23	1	1	0	▲1	2.5	11.9	5,520	+7.4
UKIP	8	0	0	0	Steady	0.0	3.3	1,549	+2.0

== Ward results ==
Incumbent councillors standing for re-election are marked with an asterisk (*). Changes in seats do not take into account by-elections or defections.

=== Bacton & Old Newton ===
Bacton & Old Newton
Party	Candidate	Votes	%	±%
Independent	Sarah Stringer*	476	48.9	
Conservative	Simon Bennett	412	42.3	
UKIP	Ian Hawkins	85	8.7	
Majority		64	6.6	
Turnout		973	49.8	+4.3
Registered electors		1,956		
Independent hold		Swing		

=== Badwell Ash ===
Badwell Ash
Party	Candidate	Votes	%	±%
Conservative	Roy Barker*	779	70.0	
Green	Andrew Mellen	183	16.4	
Liberal Democrats	Ann Gath	89	8.0	
UKIP	Thomas Fairweather	62	5.6	
Majority		596	53.5	
Turnout		1,113	52.0	−0.2
Registered electors		2,141		
Conservative hold		Swing		

=== Barking & Somersham ===
Barking & Somersham
Party	Candidate	Votes	%	±%
Suffolk Together	Stephen Wright*	493	53.4	
Conservative	Jeremy Smith	310	33.5	
Liberal Democrats	David Payne	121	13.1	
Majority		183	19.9	
Turnout		924	51.5	−0.7
Registered electors		1,794		
Suffolk Together hold		Swing		

=== Bramford & Blakenham ===
Bramford & Blakenham (2 seats)
Party	Candidate	Votes	%	±%
Suffolk Together	Michael Blakenham*	731	47.2	
Liberal Democrats	John Field*	584	37.7	
Conservative	Kevin Welsby	453	29.2	
Liberal Democrats	Brian Smith	226	14.6	
Labour	Tony Elliott	222	14.3	
Labour	Sophie Meudec	200	12.9	
Turnout		~1,549	47.8	+3.9
Registered electors		3,241		
Suffolk Together hold				
Liberal Democrats hold				

=== Claydon & Barham ===
Claydon & Barham (2 seats)
Party	Candidate	Votes	%	±%
Conservative	John Whitehead	573	35.9	
Liberal Democrats	Martin Redbond*	502	31.5	
Conservative	Linda Britt	469	29.4	
Liberal Democrats	Mohammed Touman*	296	18.6	
Labour	Jennifer Wilson	251	15.7	
Suffolk Together	Shirley Fairburn	250	15.7	
Labour	Terry Wilson	233	14.6	
Green	David Penny	139	8.7	
Turnout		~1,594	43.8	+4.1
Registered electors		3,640		
Conservative gain from Liberal Democrats				
Liberal Democrats hold				

=== Debenham ===
Debenham
Party	Candidate	Votes	%	±%
Conservative	Kathie Guthrie	509	53.3	
Green	Brian Fearnley	178	18.6	
Labour	Jennifer Chattington	176	18.4	
Liberal Democrats	Xy Stanfield	92	9.6	
Majority		333	34.9	
Turnout		955	51.3	+11.8
Registered electors		1,863		
Conservative hold		Swing		

=== Elmswell & Norton ===
Elmswell & Norton (2 seats)
Party	Candidate	Votes	%	±%
Conservative	Jane Storey	991	49.2	
Green	Sarah Mansel	657	32.6	
Liberal Democrats	Carol Milward*	615	30.5	
Liberal Democrats	Julian Cunningham	492	24.4	
Labour	Heather Salmon	291	14.5	
Turnout		~2,013	48.3	+9.7
Registered electors		4,169		
Conservative hold				
Green gain from Liberal Democrats				

=== Eye ===
Eye
Party	Candidate	Votes	%	±%
Independent	Charles Flatman*	426	49.4	
Green	Merlin Carr	334	38.7	
Labour	Peter Ede	102	11.8	
Majority		92	10.7	
Turnout		862	52.2	+52.2
Registered electors		1,652		
Independent hold		Swing		

=== Fressingfield ===
Fressingfield
Party	Candidate	Votes	%	±%
Conservative	Marilyn Curran*	575	58.6	
Liberal Democrats	Andrew Aalders-Dunthorne	230	23.4	
Labour	Garry Deeks	177	18.0	
Majority		345	35.1	
Turnout		982	51.9	+3.7
Registered electors		1,892		
Conservative hold		Swing		

=== Gislingham ===
Gislingham
Party	Candidate	Votes	%	±%
Conservative	Diana Kearsley*	696	61.9	
Green	Ged Patterson	184	16.4	
Labour	Kevin O'Keefe	152	13.5	
Liberal Democrats	Linda Smith	93	8.3	
Majority		512	45.5	
Turnout		1,125	52.9	+8
Registered electors		2,127		
Conservative hold		Swing		

=== Haughley & Wetherden ===
Haughley & Wetherden
Party	Candidate	Votes	%	±%
Green	Rachel Eburne*	Unopposed		
Registered electors		1,768		
Green gain from Conservative				

=== Helmingham & Coddenham ===
Helmingham & Coddenham
Party	Candidate	Votes	%	±%
Conservative	Tim Passmore*	719	71.8	
Liberal Democrats	Martin Spurling	283	28.2	
Majority		436	43.6	
Turnout		1,002	55.2	+9.7
Registered electors		1,814		
Conservative hold		Swing		

=== Hoxne ===
Hoxne
Party	Candidate	Votes	%	±%
Conservative	Liz Gibson-Harries*	594	64.0	
Liberal Democrats	Lorraine Edwards	175	18.9	
Labour	Geoff Hinchcliffe	159	17.1	
Majority		419	45.1	
Turnout		928	54.4	+4.6
Registered electors		1,705		
Conservative hold		Swing		

=== Mendlesham ===
Mendlesham
Party	Candidate	Votes	%	±%
Green	Andrew Stringer*	764	74.0	
Conservative	Jessica Fleming	223	21.6	
Labour	Rebecca Martin	46	4.5	
Majority		541	52.4	
Turnout		1,033	56.8	−3
Registered electors		1,817		
Green hold		Swing		

=== Needham Market ===
Needham Market (2 seats)
Party	Candidate	Votes	%	±%
Liberal Democrats	Wendy Marchant*	1,045	68.5	
Liberal Democrats	Mike Norris*	850	55.7	
UKIP	Samantha Streatfield	299	19.6	
Labour	David Hill	277	18.2	
Turnout		~1,525	42.1	+1.4
Registered electors		3,622		
Liberal Democrats hold				
Liberal Democrats hold				

=== Onehouse ===
Onehouse
Party	Candidate	Votes	%	±%
Green	John Matthissen*	539	56.3	
Conservative	Stephen Carlton-Walker*	312	32.6	
Liberal Democrats	Nicky Turner	106	11.1	
Majority		227	23.7	
Turnout		957	54.1	+2.2
Registered electors		1,768		
Green hold		Swing		

=== Palgrave ===
Palgrave
Party	Candidate	Votes	%	±%
Conservative	David Burn	534	58.7	
Green	Brian Guthrie	209	23.0	
Labour	Elaine Halton	167	18.4	
Majority		325	35.7	
Turnout		910	49.0	+49
Registered electors		1,859		
Conservative hold		Swing		

=== Rattlesden ===
Rattlesden
Party	Candidate	Votes	%	±%
Liberal Democrats	Penny Otton*	604	64.3	
Conservative	Adrian Clayden	335	35.7	
Majority		269	28.6	
Turnout		939	57.3	+4.5
Registered electors		1,638		
Liberal Democrats hold		Swing		

=== Rickinghall & Walsham ===
Rickinghall & Walsham (2 seats)
Party	Candidate	Votes	%	±%
Conservative	Sara Michell*	1,006	56.7	
Conservative	Derek Osborne*	971	54.7	
Labour	Eddie Dougall	497	28.0	
Labour	John Stebbing	426	24.0	
Turnout		~1,774	47.9	+9.1
Registered electors		3,703		
Conservative hold				
Conservative hold				

=== Ringshall ===
Ringshall
Party	Candidate	Votes	%	±%
Liberal Democrats	Patricia Godden*	528	51.0	
Conservative	David Whybrow	508	49.0	
Majority		20	1.9	
Turnout		1,036	47.8	+7.8
Registered electors		2,166		
Liberal Democrats hold		Swing		

=== Stowmarket Central ===
Stowmarket Central (2 seats)
Party	Candidate	Votes	%	±%
Conservative	Poppy Robinson*	744	45.8	
Conservative	Lesley Mayes*	636	39.2	
Labour	Suzanne Britton	398	24.5	
Green	Gareth Betts-Davies	363	22.4	
UKIP	David Griffith	252	15.5	
Liberal Democrats	John Curle	176	10.8	
Liberal Democrats	Colin Groundsell	164	10.1	
Turnout		~1,623	44.1	+8
Registered electors		3,681		
Conservative hold				
Conservative hold				

=== Stowmarket North ===
Stowmarket North (3 seats)
Party	Candidate	Votes	%	±%
Conservative	Gary Green*	1,202	49.5	
Conservative	Frank Whittle*	1,033	42.5	
Labour	Duncan Macpherson	855	35.2	
Conservative	Pete Woodley*	813	33.5	
Green	Nigel Rozier	737	30.3	
Liberal Democrats	Brij Sharma	432	17.8	
UKIP	Colin Lay	348	14.3	
Turnout		~2,430	34.6	+4.3
Registered electors		7,024		
Conservative hold				
Conservative hold				
Labour gain from Conservative				

=== Stowmarket South ===
Stowmarket South (2 seats)
Party	Candidate	Votes	%	±%
Independent	Gerard Brewster	480	32.0	
Conservative	Vera Waspe*	468	31.2	
Liberal Democrats	Keith Scarff*	403	26.8	
Green	Twiggy Davis	366	24.4	
Conservative	Anne Whybrow	345	23.0	
Labour	Jeremy Izod	254	16.9	
Liberal Democrats	Christopher Vecchi	150	10.0	
UKIP	Christopher Streatfield	108	7.2	
Turnout		~1,501	40.2	+8
Registered electors		3,735		
Independent gain from Liberal Democrats				
Conservative hold				

=== Stowupland ===
Stowupland
Party	Candidate	Votes	%	±%
Conservative	Caroline Byles*	356	40.6	
Liberal Democrats	Mark Valladares	265	30.3	
Labour	Ronald Snell	128	14.6	
Green	Craig Theobald	127	14.5	
Majority		91	10.4	
Turnout		876	48.4	+6.4
Registered electors		1,822		
Conservative hold		Swing		

=== Stradbroke & Laxfield ===
Stradbroke & Laxfield
Party	Candidate	Votes	%	±%
Independent	Stuart Gemmill*	752	72.2	
Liberal Democrats	James Hargrave	289	27.8	
Majority		463	44.4	
Turnout		1,041	50.8	+11
Registered electors		2,089		
Independent hold		Swing		

=== The Stonhams ===
The Stonhams
Party	Candidate	Votes	%	±%
Conservative	Terence Curran	462	46.2	
Liberal Democrats	Anthony Fowler*	295	29.5	
Green	Nicholas Hardingham	152	15.2	
Labour	Jan Hicks	91	9.1	
Majority		167	16.7	
Turnout		1,000	54.6	+8.6
Registered electors		1,845		
Conservative gain from Liberal Democrats		Swing		

=== Thurston & Hessett ===
Thurston & Hessett (2 seats)
Party	Candidate	Votes	%	±%
Conservative	Derrick Haley*	999	61.0	
Conservative	Sam Powell	724	44.2	
Liberal Democrats	David Kemplay	499	30.4	
UKIP	Gillian Bush	226	13.8	
UKIP	Geoffrey Palmer	169	10.3	
Turnout		~1,641	46.7	+7.5
Registered electors		3,513		
Conservative hold				
Conservative hold				

=== Wetheringsett ===
Wetheringsett
Party	Candidate	Votes	%	±%
Conservative	Charles Tilbury*	533	53.6	
Green	Rachel Turner	281	28.2	
Labour	Marion Ravenhill	128	12.9	
Liberal Democrats	Kay Field	53	5.3	
Majority		252	25.3	
Turnout		995	50.5	+7.4
Registered electors		1,981		
Conservative hold		Swing		

=== Woolpit ===
Woolpit
Party	Candidate	Votes	%	±%
Independent	Ray Melvin*	468	57.1	
Green	David Scotfield	204	24.9	
Liberal Democrats	Judith Broadway	79	9.6	
Labour	Barry Salmon	69	8.4	
Majority		264	32.2	
Turnout		820	51.4	+14.9
Registered electors		1,632		
Independent hold		Swing		

=== Worlingworth ===
Worlingworth
Party	Candidate	Votes	%	±%
Conservative	Matthew Hicks	613	63.1	
Labour	Paul Burrows	221	22.7	
Liberal Democrats	Kielen Aalders-Dunthorne	138	14.2	
Majority		392	40.3	
Turnout		972	52.1	+7.3
Registered electors		1,891		
Conservative hold		Swing		

== By-elections ==
=== Stowmarket North ===
Stowmarket North By-Election 22 May 2014
Party	Candidate	Votes	%	±%
Conservative	Barry Humphreys	707	31.8	−1.8
UKIP	Stephen Searle	616	27.7	+18.0
Green	Nigel Rozier	444	19.9	−0.7
Labour	Anthony Elliott	315	14.2	−9.7
Liberal Democrats	Nichola Willshere	144	6.5	−5.6
Majority		91	4.1	
Turnout		2,226		
Conservative hold		Swing		
