= Murder of Anne Searle =

2017 murder case in England

In 2017, Stephen Anthony Searle, a UK Independence Party (UKIP) general election candidate and recent member of Suffolk County Council, murdered his wife and told police "I've been a very naughty boy."

Searle fatally asphyxiated his wife, Anne Searle, after she caught him having an affair with their son's girlfriend. He was convicted of her murder in July 2018, jailed for life and must serve 14 years.

He was a UKIP councillor at Suffolk County Council from May 2013 to May 2017 and a general election candidate in June 2017.

== Background ==
Stephen Anthony Searle married Anne Searle in December 1972 and had three sons: Gary, Christopher and Stephen. Stephen, his son Gary and Gary's partner Pomiateeva had all worked together in a bowling alley in Ipswich.

=== Political career ===
Stephen Searle, 64, was a UKIP member of Suffolk County Council for Stowmarket South, elected in May 2013. He lost his seat in May 2017 to Conservative council leader Nick Gowrley. He was the UKIP candidate in the 2017 General Election for Central Suffolk and North Ipswich and came last of five candidates, receiving 1,635 votes.

== Murder ==
Searle murdered his wife in their house in The Brickfields, Stowmarket, Suffolk shortly before 10.30pm on 30 December 2017.

He told the 999 operator "I've just killed my wife", that this was a "bit of a bizarre situation but you know... never mind" and when asked whether there were just two people in the house replied that there was "well just the one of us now". Then he told police "I’ve been a very naughty boy" and "everyone has their breaking point".

When paramedics arrived, Anne Searle was found unresponsive and despite their best efforts, she was immediately pronounced dead.

A post mortem, carried out the following day, revealed that the cause of death was "compression of the neck". A forensic pathologist later gave evidence she "would have lost consciousness after about eight to 15 seconds of pressure" to her neck, and died after "further sustained pressure for a period of minutes". Stephen Searle had learned about performing a choke hold during military training.

He was charged and remanded in custody at South East Suffolk Magistrates’ Court on 2 January 2018. Because of its severity, the case was immediately sent upwards to the Crown Court.

== Previous abuse ==
A former partner of his son Gary, Sara Shepherd, said she was told that in the 1990s, Stephen Searle "got a bit angry" with his wife in a pub the couple ran and "got out one of his guns and threatened her in front of a whole pub full of people." A second woman said the gun was a rifle and "when she got back he shot the gun. He was aiming at her."

Kelly Lawrence, Anne Searle's colleague at a sushi firm in Earl Stonham, gave evidence that on one occasion in 2017, she spotted bruises on Anne Searle's arms, which Anne said were inflicted by her husband. Lawrence said Anne did not press any charges because after being married for so long, she believed she was "too old to start again". Another colleague, Sally Cutting, also said she was told by Anne in June 2017 that the bruises were caused by the way Stephen grabbed her arms.

Victoria Searle, the wife of their son Stephen, gave a statement that Stephen threatened to kill his wife weeks before doing so, portending "I’ll kill you. I will", and on another occasion tried to push Anne down the stairs. The witness said in the days before, he insisted on arguing about the affair every night when Anne just wanted to move on and stopped her from eating Christmas lunch by throwing the meat and trimmings in the bin.

Anne Searle posted the Facebook message "Happy Christmas... I hope I will still be here in 2018. We will see", days before her death.

== Affair ==
Stephen Searle had an affair with Anastasia Pomiateeva, the mother of his grandchild and partner of his son Gary, in the summer of 2017, several months before the murder. Searle, his son Gary and Pomiateeva had been working together in the same bowling alley in Ipswich.

The affair began in March 2017 when Stephen Searle invited Pomiateeva inside the council building of Suffolk County Council and allegedly told her it was a long time since he had sex and was sexually attracted to her. He spent weeks persistently pursuing a sexual relationship, including by sending her photographs of himself bodybuilding. Their sexual relationship began in April 2017 and his family learned of it in June 2017. Stephen Searle and Pomiateeva had continued sharing sexually explicit photographs, resulting in his wife discovering the affair when she found the images and found explicit text messages between him and Pomiateeva, in which Pomiateeva was nicknamed "SBG", meaning "Steve's beautiful girl".

== Trial ==
Stephen Searle was tried for murder at Ipswich Crown Court in July 2018.

The prosecution said it was likely he asphyxiated his wife by placing her in a choke hold for several minutes. He claimed the murder was in self-defence and accused his deceased wife of trying to stab him using a steak knife.

He was found guilty of her murder on 17 July 2018 by a jury that deliberated for three-and-a-half hours. He received a life sentence of which he must serve 14 years. He was emotionless, looking straight ahead, when sentenced.

=== Reaction ===
The judge said Stephen Searle "caused devastating waves of pain and anguish to crash through your entire family" and "brought grief and distress untold [...] You have deprived your children of the mother that they loved. You have deprived your grandchildren of their grandmother and you have deprived Anne of the remaining years of her life."

After the verdict, the killer's son Gary said he "just couldn’t believe the man I absolutely idolised and worshipped had done something like that to me." Another son, Stevie, said "today there has been justice for my mum [...] not only have I lost my mum but my dad as well [...] The part that hurts me the most is I lost my mum but the person who took my mum away was also my best friend, who was my dad."

UKIP's former leader at Suffolk County Council, Bill Mountford, said: "I'm not condoning it in any way but I was very, very sad to hear of Steve's conviction. I'm well aware domestic disputes can get out of hand but I feel equally sorry for both Steve and his now deceased wife." The charity SafeLives which campaigns against domestic violence said: "Far too often we see domestic abuse portrayed as an isolated incident that has got 'out of hand', rather than what it is: a pattern of control and abuse that sadly ends with the murder of two women a week in England and Wales." The Fawcett Society was also "shocked" by Mountford's views, saying: "We talk about getting wet in a shower of rain as 'these things happen', not the murder of a woman by her partner."
