= Bosmere Division, Suffolk =

Electoral division in Suffolk

Bosmere
- County Council constituency for the Suffolk County Council
- District: Mid Suffolk
- Region: East of England
- Population: 10,676 (2019)
- Electorate: 8,045 (2021)
- Major settlements: Needham Market

Current constituency
- Created: 1985
- Seats: 1
- Councillor: Vacant
- Local council: Mid Suffolk District Council
- Created from: Gipping No. 2

Bosmere Division is an electoral division in Mid Suffolk District which returns one county councillor to Suffolk County Council.

== Geography ==
Bosmere is a largely rural division covering the South West of the former Bosmere and Claydon Hundred area of Mid Suffolk, including the small market town of Needham Market.

== History ==
Having been held by the Liberal Democrats for 24 years, it was won back by the Conservatives in 2017 who held it in a by-election the next year. It was won by Reform in 2026 when they took control of Suffolk County Council for the first time, although the new Councillor resigned the same year forcing a by-election.

== Boundaries and boundary changes ==
=== 1985–2005 ===
- Mid Suffolk District Wards of Barking, Needham Market and Ringshall.

=== 2005–2022 ===
- Mid Suffolk District Wards of Barking and Somersham Ward, Needham Market and Ringshall Ward.

=== 2022–present ===
- Civil parishes of Badley, Barking, Battisford, Baylham, Coddenham, Darmsden, Great Bricett, Needham Market, Nettlestead, Offton, Ringshall, Somersham and Willisham

== Members for Bosmere ==
Member	Party	Term	Notes
John Patton	Conservative	1985–1993	Member for Gipping No. 2 (1977–1985)
Rosalind Scott	Liberal Democrat	1993–2005	Lib Dem Group Leader (1997–2000)
Julia Truelove	Liberal Democrat	2005–2017	
Anne Whybrow	Conservative	2017–2018	Died in August 2018
Kay Oakes	Conservative	2018–2026	
Gary Keogh	Reform	2026-Present	Due to resign on 30 September 2026

== Election results ==
=== Bosmere by-election ===
12 November 2026 by-election Resignation of Gary Keogh (Reform)
Party	Candidate	Votes	%	±%
Conservative	Kay Oakes	762	33.2	+13.8
Green	Adria Pittock	739	32.2	+2.8
Reform	Patrick Wegener	400	17.4	−16.1
Restore	Nigel Mills	182	7.9	New
Liberal Democrats	Attila Borzak	109	-4.7	8.4
Labour	Saffeen Yamulki	106	4.6	−0.1
Majority		23	1.0	−3.1
Turnout		2299	27.3	−17.3
Conservative gain from Reform		Swing	+14.95	

2026 Suffolk County Council election:Bosmere
Party	Candidate	Votes	%	±%
Reform	Gary Keogh	1,241	33.5	N/A
Green	Adria Pittock	1,090	29.4	N/A
Conservative	Kay Oakes*	720	19.4	−30.0
Liberal Democrats	Attila Borzak	485	13.1	−24.6
Labour	Tina Cooke	174	4.7	−8.2
Majority		151	4.1	N/A
Turnout		3,721	44.6	+10.1
Registered electors		8,334		
Reform gain from Conservative				

2021 Suffolk County Council election:Bosmere
Party	Candidate	Votes	%	±%
Conservative	Kay Oakes *	1,357	49.4	+3.4
Liberal Democrats	Steve Phillips	1,034	37.7	–1.2
Labour	Suzanne Britton	355	12.9	+5.1
Majority		323	11.8	+4.6
Turnout		2,774	34.5	+1.8
Registered electors		8,045		
Conservative hold		Swing	+2.3	
