= 1997 Suffolk County Council election =

1997 English local election

← 1993	1 May 1997	2001 →

All 80 seats to Suffolk County Council 41 seats needed for a majority
- Registered: 501,642 (▲3.1%)
- Turnout: 72.4% (▲36.7%)

	First party	Second party	Third party
Party	Labour	Conservative	Liberal Democrats
Last election	31 seats, 32.8%	25 seats, 37.7%	20 seats, 25.5%
Seats before	33	21	20
Seats won	33	31	15
Seat change	▲2	▲6	▼5
Popular vote	131,137	137,069	84,939
Percentage	36.1%	37.7%	23.4%
Swing	▲3.3%	Steady	▼0.9%
	Fourth party
Party	Independent
Last election	4 seats, 2.8%
Seats before	5
Seats won	1
Seat change	▼3
Popular vote	9,093
Percentage	2.5%
Swing	▼0.3%
Council control before election
No overall control
Council control after election
No overall control

The 1997 Suffolk County Council election took place on 1 May 1997 to elect members of Suffolk County Council in Suffolk, England. This was on the same day as other local elections and the 1997 general election.

== Previous composition ==
=== 1993 election ===
Party	Seats
Labour	31
Conservative	25
Liberal Democrats	20
Independent	4
Total	80

=== Composition of council seats before election ===
Party	Seats
Labour	33
Conservative	22
Liberal Democrats	20
Independent	4
Vacant	1
Total	80

== Summary ==
=== Election result ===
1997 Suffolk County Council election
Party	Candidates	Seats	Gains	Losses	Net gain/loss	Seats %	Votes %	Votes	+/−
Labour	72	33	4	2	▲2	41.3	36.1	131,137	+3.3
Conservative	80	31	8	4	▲4	38.8	37.7	137,069	±0.0
Liberal Democrats	65	15	2	5	▼3	18.8	23.4	84,939	–0.9
Independent	9	1	0	2	▼2	1.3	2.5	9,093	–0.3
Green	2	0	0	0	Steady	0.0	0.2	871	–0.3

=== Election of Group Leaders ===
Chris Mole (Ipswich Town) was re-elected leader of the Labour Group, with Jane Hore (Oulton Broad) as his deputy.

Sue Sida-Lockett (Thedwastre North) was elected leader of the Conservative Group, with Colin Barrow (Wickham) as her deputy.

Rosalind Scott (Bosmere) was elected leader of the Liberal Democrat Group, with Peter Monk (Wilford) as her deputy.

=== Election of Leader of the Council ===
Chris Mole the leader of the Labour group was duly elected leader of the council and formed a Labour/Lib Dem administration, with Rosalind Scott as his deputy.

== Results by district ==
=== Babergh ===
Summary

Babergh District Summary
Party	Seats	+/-	Votes	%	+/-
Liberal Democrats	6	▲2	18,614	38.3	+10.0
Labour	2	Steady	10,288	21.2	–1.1
Conservative	1	▼1	16,432	33.8	–3.6
Independent	1	Steady	3,292	6.8	+0.2
Total	10	Steady	48,626	74.4	+35.1

Division results

Belstead Brook
Party	Candidate	Votes	%	±%
Liberal Democrats	Anne Pollard *	4,263	71.3	±0.0
Conservative	Michael Nottingham	1,719	28.7	±0.0
Majority		2,544	42.5	±0.0
Turnout		5,982	72.9	+36.9
Registered electors		8,167		
Liberal Democrats hold		Swing	0.0	

Brett
Party	Candidate	Votes	%	±%
Liberal Democrats	Michael Gleed *	1,583	41.1	–2.0
Conservative	Peter Stevens	1,494	38.8	–2.4
Labour	Valma Letton	771	20.0	+4.3
Majority		89	2.3	+0.4
Turnout		3,848	76.5	+27.4
Registered electors		5,030		
Liberal Democrats hold		Swing	▲0.2	

Cosford
Party	Candidate	Votes	%	±%
Liberal Democrats	Vivienne Hoy	1,524	46.1	+12.7
Conservative	William Curnow	1,400	42.3	–24.3
Independent	Tony Bailey-Smith *	384	11.6	N/A
Majority		124	3.7	N/A
Turnout		3,308	73.4	+46.8
Registered electors		4,508		
Liberal Democrats gain from Conservative		Swing	▲18.5	

Great Cornard
Party	Candidate	Votes	%	±%
Labour	Wilmoth Gibson *	2,752	64.8	+17.2
Conservative	Brian Rayner	1,492	35.2	–0.1
Majority		1,260	29.7	+17.3
Turnout		4,244	70.4	+32.9
Registered electors		6,027		
Labour hold		Swing	▲8.7	

Hadleigh
Party	Candidate	Votes	%	±%
Liberal Democrats	David Grutchfield *	3,022	74.9	+7.3
Conservative	Vivien Chapman	1,015	25.1	+1.5
Majority		2,007	49.7	+5.7
Turnout		4,037	74.2	+31.2
Registered electors		5,443		
Liberal Democrats hold		Swing	▲2.9	

Melford
Party	Candidate	Votes	%	±%
Independent	Richard Kemp *	2,908	52.8	–4.0
Conservative	Jane Burton	1,431	26.0	–0.8
Labour	Tessa Munt	1,166	21.2	+4.6
Majority		1,477	26.8	–3.4
Turnout		5,505	75.1	+34.6
Registered electors		7,333		
Independent hold		Swing	▼1.6	

Peninsula
Party	Candidate	Votes	%	±%
Liberal Democrats	Shirley Clarke *	2,774	65.1	+18.9
Conservative	Stephen Williams	1,485	34.9	–7.1
Majority		1,289	30.3	+26.1
Turnout		4,259	73.9	+33.4
Registered electors		5,760		
Liberal Democrats hold		Swing	▲13.0	

Samford
Party	Candidate	Votes	%	±%
Liberal Democrats	Edmund Wheatley	2,219	45.3	–3.6
Conservative	William Yorke-Edwards	1,614	33.0	–3.6
Labour	Brian Kennedy	1,064	21.7	+7.3
Majority		605	12.4	+0.0
Turnout		4,897	79.6	+31.9
Registered electors		6,149		
Liberal Democrats hold		Swing	+0.0	

Stour Valley
Party	Candidate	Votes	%	±%
Conservative	Selwyn Pryor *	2,684	47.0	–3.9
Liberal Democrats	Kenneth Watkins	1,618	28.3	+5.1
Labour	Geoffrey Hulme	1,408	24.7	–1.3
Majority		1,066	18.7	–6.2
Turnout		5,710	76.8	+38.0
Registered electors		7,437		
Conservative hold		Swing	▼4.5	

Sudbury
Party	Candidate	Votes	%	±%
Labour	Elizabeth Wiles *	3,127	45.7	–15.7
Conservative	John Stewart	2,097	30.7	–7.9
Liberal Democrats	Gabrielle Blackman-Sheppard	1,611	23.6	N/A
Majority		1,030	15.1	–7.7
Turnout		6,835	71.8	+36.0
Registered electors		9,517		
Labour hold		Swing	▼3.9	

=== Forest Heath ===
Summary

Forest Heath District Summary
Party	Seats	+/-	Votes	%	+/-
Conservative	6	▲2	10,690	45.8	+0.8
Labour	0	Steady	7,062	30.2	+6.8
Liberal Democrats	0	▼1	4,043	17.3	–8.0
Independent	0	▼1	1,569	6.7	+2.9
Total	6	Steady	23,364	67.5	+42.5

Division results

Brandon
Party	Candidate	Votes	%	±%
Conservative	Bill Bishop*	1,771	43.7	–15.5
Labour	Thomas Silver	1,358	33.5	+4.4
Independent	Ronald Banks	562	13.9	N/A
Liberal Democrats	Douglas Prater	358	8.8	N/A
Majority		413	10.2	–20.0
Turnout		4,049	65.8	+35.3
Registered electors		6,156		
Conservative hold		Swing	▼10.0	

Exning
Party	Candidate	Votes	%	±%
Conservative	Donald Levick	1,960	43.4	+24.0
Liberal Democrats	Catriona Pilborough	1,304	28.8	–37.5
Labour	Hilda Halliwell	1,256	27.8	+13.5
Majority		656	14.5	N/A
Turnout		4,520	68.3	+41.0
Registered electors		6,623		
Conservative gain from Liberal Democrats		Swing	▲30.8	

Icknield
Party	Candidate	Votes	%	±%
Conservative	Jane Andrews-Smith	1,951	49.3	–2.9
Labour	Philip Kemp	1,108	28.0	+0.6
Liberal Democrats	Margaret Brame	896	22.7	+2.2
Majority		843	21.3	–3.5
Turnout		3,955	73.7	+42.0
Registered electors		5,367		
Conservative hold		Swing	▼1.8	

Mildenhall
Party	Candidate	Votes	%	±%
Conservative	Paul Pendleton*	1,576	44.5	+3.4
Labour	John Taylor	1,408	39.7	+13.9
Liberal Democrats	David Whitear	559	15.8	+4.8
Majority		168	4.7	–10.6
Turnout		3,543	64.9	+37.8
Registered electors		5,461		
Conservative hold		Swing	▼5.3	

Newmarket Town
Party	Candidate	Votes	%	±%
Conservative	Arthur Crickmere*	1,705	48.2	–4.7
Labour	Vivien Uney	1,150	32.5	+11.8
Liberal Democrats	Maureen Bolton	561	15.9	–10.5
Independent	William Attwood	118	3.3	N/A
Majority		555	15.7	–10.7
Turnout		3,534	63.2	+31.3
Registered electors		5,590		
Conservative hold		Swing	▼8.3	

Row Heath
Party	Candidate	Votes	%	±%
Conservative	Ellen Crane	1,727	45.9	N/A
Independent	John Barker	889	23.6	N/A
Labour	Cyril Brown	782	20.8	N/A
Liberal Democrats	Daphne Willingham	365	9.7	N/A
Majority		838	22.3	N/A
Turnout		3,763	69.2	N/A
Registered electors		5,436		
Conservative gain from Independent		Swing		

=== Ipswich ===
Summary

Ipswich District Summary
Party	Seats	+/-	Votes	%	+/-
Labour	13	Steady	34,475	52.2	+2.5
Conservative	4	Steady	23,166	35.1	–1.4
Liberal Democrats	0	Steady	8,373	12.7	–0.7
Total	17	Steady	66,014	70.1	+36.0

Division results

Bixley
Party	Candidate	Votes	%	±%
Conservative	Russell Harsant	2,285	50.6	–7.1
Labour	Anne Murray	1,321	29.3	+4.6
Liberal Democrats	Robin Whitmore	910	20.2	+2.5
Majority		964	21.3	–11.7
Turnout		4,516	77.1	+37.4
Registered electors		5,855		
Conservative hold		Swing	▼5.9	

Bridge
Party	Candidate	Votes	%	±%
Labour	Kenneth Doran*	1,903	53.0	–11.5
Conservative	Kathleen Kenna	1,148	32.0	+5.7
Liberal Democrats	Sally Rush	540	15.0	N/A
Majority		755	21.0	–17.4
Turnout		3,591	63.1	+36.1
Registered electors		5,687		
Labour hold		Swing	▼8.6	

Broom Hill
Party	Candidate	Votes	%	±%
Conservative	Mary Young	1,387	39.2	–9.4
Labour	Keith Herod *	1,380	39.0	+5.0
Liberal Democrats	Nigel Cheeseman	770	21.8	+4.3
Majority		7	0.2	–14.4
Turnout		3,537	69.5	+37.2
Registered electors		5,090		
Conservative hold		Swing	▼7.2	

Castle Hill
Party	Candidate	Votes	%	±%
Conservative	Dale Jackson	1,859	42.0	–6.5
Labour	Christopher Newbury	1,688	38.1	+0.9
Liberal Democrats	Dennis Day	881	19.9	+5.6
Majority		171	3.9	–7.4
Turnout		4,428	76.7	+40.8
Registered electors		5,771		
Conservative hold		Swing	▼3.7	

Chantry
Party	Candidate	Votes	%	±%
Labour	Susan Thomas*	1,805	60.5	+7.6
Conservative	Anne Thrussell	733	24.6	–22.5
Liberal Democrats	Donald Perkins	447	15.0	N/A
Majority		1,072	35.9	+30.2
Turnout		2,985	65.8	+25.2
Registered electors		4,540		
Labour hold		Swing	▲15.1	

Gainsborough
Party	Candidate	Votes	%	±%
Labour	Ronald Sudds *	2,329	59.0	+8.2
Conservative	Roman Holownia	941	23.9	+7.1
Liberal Democrats	Martin Whitehead	675	17.1	–15.3
Majority		1,388	35.2	+16.7
Turnout		3,945	67.8	+35.0
Registered electors		6,829		
Labour hold		Swing	▲0.6	

Ipswich St Margarets
Party	Candidate	Votes	%	±%
Conservative	Jeffrey Stansfield	1,761	40.0	–1.7
Labour	Elizabeth Cooper	1,647	37.4	+15.7
Liberal Democrats	Karen Wroe	991	22.5	–14.0
Majority		114	2.6	–2.6
Turnout		4,399	73.6	+27.8
Registered electors		5,981		
Conservative hold		Swing	▼8.7	

Ipswich Town
Party	Candidate	Votes	%	±%
Labour	Chris Mole*	2,027	55.9	–5.3
Conservative	Keith Matthews	921	25.4	–0.9
Liberal Democrats	Julian Eddy	677	18.7	+6.2
Majority		1,106	30.5	–4.5
Turnout		3,625	59.9	+32.4
Registered electors		6,057		
Labour hold		Swing	▼2.3	

Priory Heath
Party	Candidate	Votes	%	±%
Labour	Kenneth Wilson *	1,985	54.3	–16.9
Conservative	Margaret Baldry	1,020	27.9	–0.9
Liberal Democrats	Karen Deere	648	17.7	N/A
Majority		965	26.4	–15.9
Turnout		3,653	68.9	+39.7
Registered electors		5,305		
Labour hold		Swing	▼8.0	

Rushmere
Party	Candidate	Votes	%	±%
Labour	Brian Le Grys *	2,507	56.6	+7.9
Conservative	Stephen Ion	1,925	43.4	+5.2
Majority		582	13.1	+2.7
Turnout		4,432	73.7	+30.3
Registered electors		6,015		
Labour hold		Swing	▲1.4	

Sprites
Party	Candidate	Votes	%	±%
Labour	Robin Sargent*	2,505	66.5	–7.0
Conservative	John Langley	1,260	33.5	+7.0
Majority		1,245	33.1	–13.8
Turnout		3,765	70.2	+40.5
Registered electors		5,361		
Labour hold		Swing	▼7.0	

St Clements
Party	Candidate	Votes	%	±%
Labour	Brian Coleman*	2,367	56.9	+11.1
Conservative	Tracy Kenna	1,792	43.1	+2.4
Majority		575	13.8	+8.7
Turnout		4,159	72.2	+28.5
Registered electors		5,761		
Labour hold		Swing	▲4.4	

St John's
Party	Candidate	Votes	%	±%
Labour	Sandy Martin	2,478	58.0	+5.6
Conservative	Donald Ward	1,791	42.0	+7.4
Majority		687	16.1	–1.6
Turnout		4,269	70.5	+35.4
Registered electors		6,052		
Labour hold		Swing	▼0.8	

Stoke Park
Party	Candidate	Votes	%	±%
Labour	Bryony Rudkin	1,862	48.1	–3.0
Conservative	Gordon Terry	1,223	31.6	–5.3
Liberal Democrats	David Mullett	789	20.4	+8.4
Majority		639	16.5	+2.3
Turnout		3,874	68.9	+36.2
Registered electors		6,052		
Labour hold		Swing	▲1.2	

Whitehouse
Party	Candidate	Votes	%	±%
Labour	Barry Moore	1,997	57.2	–6.5
Conservative	Christine Carlton	892	25.5	–1.3
Liberal Democrats	Nina Day	603	17.3	+7.7
Majority		1,105	31.6	–5.3
Turnout		3,492	65.0	+36.4
Registered electors		5,376		
Labour hold		Swing	▼2.6	

Whittington
Party	Candidate	Votes	%	±%
Labour	Malcolm Cherry	2,442	60.7	–0.2
Conservative	David Collins	1,139	28.3	+2.2
Liberal Democrats	Sandra Tonge	442	11.0	–2.0
Majority		1,303	32.4	–2.4
Turnout		4,023	74.0	+44.7
Registered electors		5,436		
Labour hold		Swing	▼1.2	

Whitton
Party	Candidate	Votes	%	±%
Labour	Anthony Lewis *	2,232	67.2	–2.7
Conservative	Stephen Lark	1,089	32.8	+2.7
Majority		1,143	34.4	–5.4
Turnout		3,321	66.3	+41.1
Registered electors		5,011		
Labour hold		Swing	▼2.7	

=== Mid Suffolk ===
Summary

Mid Suffolk District Summary
Party	Seats	+/-	Votes	%	+/-
Conservative	5	▲4	19,289	40.2	+4.5
Liberal Democrats	4	▼2	15,716	32.7	–5.9
Labour	1	▼2	12,352	25.7	+1.7
Green	0	Steady	682	1.4	–0.3
Total	10	Steady	48,039	74.7	+36.9

Division results

Bosmere
Party	Candidate	Votes	%	±%
Liberal Democrats	Rosalind Scott *	2,533	49.6	–11.0
Conservative	Henry Davies	1,566	30.7	+4.0
Labour	Neil Scarff	1,009	19.8	+7.1
Majority		967	18.9	–15.0
Turnout		5,108	73.2	+30.8
Registered electors		6,979		
Liberal Democrats hold		Swing	▼7.5	

Gipping Valley
Party	Candidate	Votes	%	±%
Conservative	John Williams	2,278	51.9	+13.2
Labour	Terence Wilson *	2,114	48.1	+8.6
Majority		164	3.7	N/A
Turnout		4,392	71.7	+41.8
Registered electors		6,129		
Conservative gain from Labour		Swing	▲2.3	

Hartismere
Party	Candidate	Votes	%	±%
Conservative	Charles Michell	2,105	41.5	+10.3
Labour	Terence O'Keefe	1,756	34.6	+13.5
Liberal Democrats	Hugh Stewart	1,210	23.9	–23.8
Majority		349	6.9	N/A
Turnout		5,071	72.8	+27.8
Registered electors		6,964		
Conservative gain from Liberal Democrats		Swing	▼1.6	

Hoxne
Party	Candidate	Votes	%	±%
Liberal Democrats	Julie Craven*	2,930	56.6	+10.3
Conservative	Guy McGregor	2,245	43.4	+2.5
Majority		685	13.2	+7.8
Turnout		5,175	75.8	+32.6
Registered electors		6,827		
Liberal Democrats hold		Swing	▲7.8	

Stowmarket St Mary's
Party	Candidate	Votes	%	±%
Liberal Democrats	Alan Lower *	1,608	41.0	–13.2
Labour	John Drake	1,212	30.9	+0.5
Conservative	Gordon Paton	1,100	28.1	+12.7
Majority		396	10.1	–13.7
Turnout		3,920	74.3	+35.2
Registered electors		5,274		
Liberal Democrats hold		Swing	▼6.9	

Stowmarket St Peter's
Party	Candidate	Votes	%	±%
Labour	Duncan Macpherson *	1,738	45.4	–4.4
Conservative	Malcolm McLagan	1,188	31.1	+8.6
Liberal Democrats	Roger Rehahn	899	23.5	–4.2
Majority		550	14.4	–7.7
Turnout		3,825	69.9	+38.9
Registered electors		5,470		
Labour hold		Swing	▼6.5	

Thedwastre North
Party	Candidate	Votes	%	±%
Conservative	Sue Sida-Lockett*	2,490	46.8	–13.6
Labour	John Dougall	1,482	27.9	–11.7
Liberal Democrats	Richard Flower	1,347	25.3	N/A
Majority		1,008	19.0	–1.7
Turnout		5,319	81.4	+51.2
Registered electors		6,533		
Conservative hold		Swing	▼1.0	

Thedwastre South
Party	Candidate	Votes	%	±%
Conservative	Thomas Iredale	2,112	39.5	–4.5
Liberal Democrats	Clive Ward *	1,720	32.2	–23.8
Labour	Robert Durrant	1,517	28.4	N/A
Majority		392	7.3	N/A
Turnout		5,349	75.3	+38.8
Registered electors		7,107		
Conservative gain from Liberal Democrats		Swing	▲9.7	

Thredling
Party	Candidate	Votes	%	±%
Liberal Democrats	Helen Whitworth	2,612	53.0	–4.2
Conservative	Richard Passmore	2,317	47.0	+4.2
Majority		295	6.0	–8.4
Turnout		4,929	72.7	+35.7
Registered electors		6,781		
Liberal Democrats hold		Swing	▼4.2	

Upper Gipping
Party	Candidate	Votes	%	±%
Conservative	Jeremy Clover	1,888	38.1	+4.0
Labour	Margaret Wright	1,524	30.8	–20.3
Liberal Democrats	Peter Dyble	857	17.3	N/A
Green	Roger Stearn	682	13.8	–1.0
Majority		364	7.4	N/A
Turnout		4,951	76.6	+34.3
Registered electors		6,465		
Conservative gain from Labour		Swing	▲12.2	

=== Suffolk Coastal ===
Summary

Suffolk Coastal District Summary
Party	Seats	+/-	Votes	%	+/-
Conservative	8	▼1	28,499	40.5	–2.6
Liberal Democrats	4	▲1	21,488	30.5	–0.3
Labour	2	Steady	19,954	28.3	+3.3
Independent	0	Steady	296	0.4	N/A
Green	0	Steady	189	0.3	–0.8
Total	14	Steady	70,426	74.5	+34.5

Division results

Blything
Party	Candidate	Votes	%	±%
Conservative	Richard Church	1,766	45.8	–4.1
Liberal Democrats	Peter Perren	1,099	28.5	+4.6
Labour	Michael Taylor	988	25.6	+8.4
Majority		667	17.3	–11.6
Turnout		3,853	74.8	+32.0
Registered electors		5,149		
Conservative hold		Swing	▼4.4	

Bungay
Party	Candidate	Votes	%	±%
Conservative	Morris Rose *	1,872	40.8	+2.4
Labour	Arthur Fisher	1,807	39.4	+9.1
Liberal Democrats	Stephen Went	913	19.9	–11.4
Majority		65	1.4	–5.7
Turnout		4,592	74.4	+28.6
Registered electors		6,176		
Conservative hold		Swing	▼3.4	

Carlford
Party	Candidate	Votes	%	±%
Conservative	Howard Bestow *	2,704	46.7	–1.8
Liberal Democrats	George Bull	1,768	30.5	–9.5
Labour	Derek Emery	1,324	22.8	+11.3
Majority		936	16.1	+7.5
Turnout		5,796	78.9	+39.8
Registered electors		7,344		
Conservative hold		Swing	▲3.9	

Clay Hills
Party	Candidate	Votes	%	±%
Labour	Joan Girling *	2,645	53.5	–6.1
Conservative	John Geater	2,299	46.5	+6.1
Majority		346	7.0	–12.2
Turnout		4,944	70.6	+28.2
Registered electors		7,008		
Labour hold		Swing	▼6.1	

Colneis
Party	Candidate	Votes	%	±%
Conservative	Candida Snow	2,812	43.0	–9.1
Labour	Reginald Dixon	2,359	36.0	+10.2
Liberal Democrats	Stephen Tuthill	1,376	21.0	–1.0
Majority		453	6.9	–19.4
Turnout		6,547	75.5	+42.9
Registered electors		8,670		
Conservative hold		Swing	▼9.7	

Felixstowe Ferry
Party	Candidate	Votes	%	±%
Conservative	Robert Stirrat	2,237	47.7	–4.9
Liberal Democrats	Pamela Dangerfield	1,358	29.0	+5.8
Labour	David Rowe	1,094	23.3	–0.9
Majority		879	18.7	–9.8
Turnout		4,689	78.0	+36.2
Registered electors		6,012		
Conservative hold		Swing	▼3.4	

Felixstowe Landguard
Party	Candidate	Votes	%	±%
Liberal Democrats	Cherrie Macgregor *	1,817	37.7	–14.3
Labour	John Mullen	1,452	30.1	+11.7
Conservative	Eric Bishop	1,258	26.1	–3.5
Independent	Thomas Savage	296	6.1	N/A
Majority		365	7.6	–14.8
Turnout		4,823	68.4	+35.0
Registered electors		7,052		
Liberal Democrats hold		Swing	▼13.0	

Felixstowe Walton
Party	Candidate	Votes	%	±%
Labour	Donald Smith*	1,947	45.8	+0.2
Conservative	John Bailey	1,492	35.1	–1.3
Liberal Democrats	Andrew Yates	813	19.1	+1.0
Majority		455	10.7	+1.5
Turnout		4,252	75.3	+29.0
Registered electors		5,646		
Labour hold		Swing	▲0.8	

Framlingham
Party	Candidate	Votes	%	±%
Liberal Democrats	Peter Howard	2,399	55.4	+30.5
Conservative	Peter Batho	1,929	44.6	–2.9
Majority		470	10.9	N/A
Turnout		4,328	73.2	+36.8
Registered electors		5,911		
Liberal Democrats gain from Conservative		Swing	▲16.7	

Kesgrave & Martlesham
Party	Candidate	Votes	%	±%
Conservative	Christopher Penn *	3,096	39.8	–4.4
Liberal Democrats	John Kelso	2,750	35.4	–3.0
Labour	Nigel Fox	1,744	22.4	+5.0
Green	John Forbes	189	2.4	N/A
Majority		346	4.4	–1.3
Turnout		7,779	76.2	+40.7
Registered electors		10,215		
Conservative hold		Swing	▼0.7	

Plomesgate
Party	Candidate	Votes	%	±%
Conservative	Ronald Ward *	1,714	42.9	–0.8
Liberal Democrats	Shirley Fry	1,351	33.8	–3.7
Labour	Perry Mann	932	23.3	+4.5
Majority		363	9.1	+3.0
Turnout		3,997	73.0	+27.3
Registered electors		5,476		
Conservative hold		Swing	▲1.5	

Wickham
Party	Candidate	Votes	%	±%
Conservative	Colin Barrow	1,927	37.0	–7.8
Liberal Democrats	Bryan Hall	1,813	34.9	+6.0
Labour	Roy Burgon	1,462	28.1	+1.7
Majority		114	2.2	–13.7
Turnout		5,202	75.9	+39.7
Registered electors		6,855		
Conservative hold		Swing	▼6.9	

Wilford
Party	Candidate	Votes	%	±%
Liberal Democrats	Peter Monk *	2,055	41.3	–6.8
Conservative	Walter Fraser	1,866	37.5	–2.7
Labour	Oliver Gibbs	1,058	21.2	+9.4
Majority		189	3.8	–4.1
Turnout		4,979	72.2	+29.9
Registered electors		6,895		
Liberal Democrats hold		Swing	▼2.1	

Woodbridge
Party	Candidate	Votes	%	±%
Liberal Democrats	Michael Eveleigh *	1,976	42.5	–7.1
Conservative	Malcolm Miles	1,527	32.9	–3.0
Labour	Harold Stone	1,142	24.6	+10.1
Majority		449	9.7	–4.1
Turnout		4,645	76.2	+29.6
Registered electors		6,098		
Liberal Democrats hold		Swing	▼2.1	

=== St Edmundsbury ===
Summary

St Edmundsbury District Summary
Party	Seats	+/-	Votes	%	+/-
Conservative	6	▲1	21,262	40.1	–0.5
Labour	4	▲1	19,034	35.9	+7.2
Liberal Democrats	1	▼2	11,956	22.6	–5.4
Independent	0	Steady	720	1.4	+1.1
Total	11	Steady	52,972	72.1	+38.7

Division results

Abbeygate & Eastgate
Party	Candidate	Votes	%	±%
Conservative	Derek Speakman	2,362	39.1	–13.4
Labour	Rosemary Muge	1,963	32.5	+8.4
Liberal Democrats	Peter Dulieu	991	16.4	–7.0
Independent	David Nettleton	720	11.9	N/A
Majority		399	6.6	–21.8
Turnout		6,036	72.6	+40.6
Registered electors		8,316		
Conservative hold		Swing	▼10.9	

Blackbourn
Party	Candidate	Votes	%	±%
Conservative	Joanna Spicer*	2,755	50.4	–1.1
Labour	Joseph Moore	1,471	26.9	–3.8
Liberal Democrats	Thomas Cook	1,238	22.7	+4.9
Majority		1,284	23.5	+2.7
Turnout		6,036	73.8	+36.1
Registered electors		7,408		
Conservative hold		Swing	▲1.4	

Clare
Party	Candidate	Votes	%	±%
Liberal Democrats	Rosemary Warmington*	2,431	53.5	+2.8
Conservative	Jeffrey Stevens	2,112	46.5	–2.8
Majority		319	7.0	+5.6
Turnout		4,543	73.8	+40.2
Registered electors		6,158		
Liberal Democrats hold		Swing	▲2.8	

Haverhill North
Party	Candidate	Votes	%	±%
Labour	Laurence Kiernan *	2,807	53.6	–19.8
Conservative	Alexander Bridges	1,640	31.3	+4.7
Liberal Democrats	Geoffrey Ridout	786	15.0	N/A
Majority		1,167	22.3	–24.4
Turnout		5,233	68.9	+44.3
Registered electors		7,592		
Labour hold		Swing	▼12.3	

Haverhill South
Party	Candidate	Votes	%	±%
Labour	Marianne Lee	2,538	49.1	+19.3
Liberal Democrats	Myrtle Bibby	1,316	25.5	–30.6
Conservative	Joy Watkins-Ellis	1,311	25.4	+14.0
Majority		1,222	23.7	N/A
Turnout		5,165	65.8	+35.9
Registered electors		7,853		
Labour gain from Liberal Democrats		Swing	▲25.0	

Northgate & St Olaves
Party	Candidate	Votes	%	±%
Labour	David Lockwood *	2,403	68.3	–9.3
Conservative	Ann Williams	647	18.4	+5.3
Liberal Democrats	Brian Fearnley	467	13.3	+3.9
Majority		1,756	49.9	–14.6
Turnout		3,517	69.0	+38.8
Registered electors		5,101		
Labour hold		Swing	▼7.3	

Risbridge
Party	Candidate	Votes	%	±%
Conservative	Jane Midwood	2,344	50.8	–2.4
Labour	Alexander Carmichael	1,309	28.4	+6.7
Liberal Democrats	Leslie Warmington	964	20.9	–4.3
Majority		1,035	22.4	–5.5
Turnout		4,617	76.3	+38.1
Registered electors		6,054		
Conservative hold		Swing	▼4.5	

Risbygate & Sextons
Party	Candidate	Votes	%	±%
Labour	Ray Nowak*	2,228	55.4	+13.2
Conservative	Irene Speakman	1,792	44.6	+5.4
Majority		436	10.8	+7.8
Turnout		4,020	72.3	+37.2
Registered electors		5,559		
Labour hold		Swing	▲3.9	

Southgate & Westgate
Party	Candidate	Votes	%	±%
Conservative	Michael Brundle	2,115	35.2	+1.7
Liberal Democrats	Grant Elliot	2,056	34.2	–32.3
Labour	Robert Corfe	1,838	30.6	N/A
Majority		59	1.0	N/A
Turnout		6,009	73.8	+36.5
Registered electors		8,147		
Conservative gain from Liberal Democrats		Swing	▲17.0	

Thingoe North
Party	Candidate	Votes	%	±%
Conservative	Simon Pott	2,560	49.3	–6.8
Labour	Robert Cockle	1,573	30.3	+8.6
Liberal Democrats	Mary Black	1,063	20.5	–1.7
Majority		987	19.0	–15.4
Turnout		5,196	73.5	+37.1
Registered electors		7,069		
Conservative hold		Swing	▼7.7	

Thingoe South
Party	Candidate	Votes	%	±%
Conservative	Elizabeth Milburn *	1,624	51.2	–2.3
Labour	David Dawson	904	28.5	+1.0
Liberal Democrats	Raie Wilman	644	20.3	+1.3
Majority		720	22.7	–3.2
Turnout		3,172	75.4	+43.5
Registered electors		4,205		
Conservative hold		Swing	▼1.7	

=== Waveney ===
Summary

Waveney District Summary
Party	Seats	+/-	Votes	%	+/-
Labour	11	▲3	27,972	52.1	+4.4
Conservative	1	▼1	17,731	33.0	+4.2
Liberal Democrats	0	Steady	4,749	8.8	–3.7
Independent	0	▼2	3,216	6.0	–5.0
Total	12	Steady	53,669	71.4	+36.4

Division results

Beccles
Party	Candidate	Votes	%	±%
Labour	Harold Ley *	2,419	55.1	–12.0
Conservative	Valerie Pulford	1,351	30.8	–2.1
Liberal Democrats	Arnold Martin	618	14.1	N/A
Majority		1,068	24.3	–10.0
Turnout		4,388	74.4	+38.5
Registered electors		5,899		
Labour hold		Swing	▼5.0	

Gunton
Party	Candidate	Votes	%	±%
Labour	Norman Rimmell *	1,702	45.8	+17.8
Conservative	David Howes	1,503	40.4	–8.2
Liberal Democrats	Jacqueline Woolley	515	13.8	–9.5
Majority		199	5.3	N/A
Turnout		3,720	72.9	+36.3
Registered electors		5,102		
Labour gain from Conservative		Swing	▲13.0	

Halesworth
Party	Candidate	Votes	%	±%
Labour	Paul Honeker	2,152	53.1	+4.7
Conservative	Robert Niblett	1,904	46.9	+5.5
Majority		248	6.1	–0.8
Turnout		4,056	74.1	+28.4
Registered electors		5,475		
Labour hold		Swing	▼0.4	

Lothingland North
Party	Candidate	Votes	%	±%
Labour	Brian Hunter *	2,856	53.0	–1.5
Conservative	Stephen Ames	1,756	32.6	–3.3
Liberal Democrats	Anthony Tibbitt	773	14.4	+4.8
Majority		1,100	20.4	+1.8
Turnout		5,385	74.2	+37.5
Registered electors		7,260		
Labour hold		Swing	▲0.9	

Lothingland South
Party	Candidate	Votes	%	±%
Labour	Antony Andrews	2,532	43.6	+15.8
Independent	James Mitchell*	1,746	30.1	–18.7
Conservative	Rosalind Wallington	1,524	26.3	+3.0
Majority		786	13.5	N/A
Turnout		5,802	71.0	+39.5
Registered electors		8,176		
Labour gain from Independent		Swing	▲17.3	

Lowestoft Central
Party	Candidate	Votes	%	±%
Labour	Nye Owen *	2,496	62.6	–3.2
Conservative	Michelle Regester	752	18.8	+4.2
Liberal Democrats	Kevin Evans	742	18.6	–1.0
Majority		1,744	43.7	–2.4
Turnout		3,990	63.6	+35.3
Registered electors		6,271		
Labour hold		Swing	▼3.7	

Lowestoft St Margarets
Party	Candidate	Votes	%	±%
Labour	Marie Rodgers *	2,489	63.6	–5.2
Conservative	Anne Mylan	914	23.3	+3.5
Liberal Democrats	Alan Howe	512	13.1	+1.7
Majority		1,575	40.2	–8.9
Turnout		3,915	71.4	+43.4
Registered electors		5,466		
Labour hold		Swing	▼4.4	

Normanston
Party	Candidate	Votes	%	±%
Labour	Graham Gouldby	2,670	66.4	–14.9
Conservative	Francis Gaimster	871	21.7	+10.0
Liberal Democrats	Brian Howe	478	11.9	+4.9
Majority		1,799	44.8	–24.9
Turnout		4,019	67.1	+35.1
Registered electors		5,991		
Labour hold		Swing	▼12.5	

Oulton Broad
Party	Candidate	Votes	%	±%
Labour	Jane Hore *	2,730	54.5	+15.8
Conservative	Michael Barnard	2,280	45.5	+0.3
Majority		450	9.0	N/A
Turnout		5,010	70.5	+36.5
Registered electors		7,111		
Labour gain from Conservative		Swing	▲7.8	

Pakefield
Party	Candidate	Votes	%	±%
Labour	Roger Bellham *	2,593	49.7	–9.9
Conservative	Peter Browne	1,517	29.1	+23.7
Liberal Democrats	Andrew Shepherd	1,111	21.3	–13.7
Majority		1,076	20.6	–3.9
Turnout		5,221	72.3	+39.7
Registered electors		7,226		
Labour hold		Swing	▼16.8	

Southwold
Party	Candidate	Votes	%	±%
Conservative	John Goldsmith	1,541	39.8	+11.4
Independent	Graham Langley *	1,470	38.0	–33.6
Labour	Christopher Scott	862	22.3	N/A
Majority		71	1.8	N/A
Turnout		3,873	75.5	+30.8
Registered electors		5,131		
Conservative gain from Independent		Swing	▲22.5	

Wainford
Party	Candidate	Votes	%	±%
Labour	John Taylor	2,472	57.6	+12.4
Conservative	Paul Newson	1,818	42.4	+7.7
Majority		654	15.2	+4.8
Turnout		4,290	70.8	+35.3
Registered electors		6,064		
Labour hold		Swing	▲2.4	
