= 1993 Suffolk County Council election =

1993 UK local government election

| ← 1989 | 6 May 1993 | 1997 → |

All 80 seats to Suffolk County Council 41 seats needed for a majority
- Registered: 486,637 (▲1.9%)
- Turnout: 35.7% (▼1.8%)

| | First party | Second party | Third party |
|---|---|---|---|
| Party | Labour | Conservative | Liberal Democrats |
| Last election | 26 seats, 34.9% | 46 seats, 43.8% | 5 seats, 15.3% |
| Seats won | 31 | 25 | 20 |
| Seat change | ▲5 | ▼19 | ▲13 |
| Popular vote | 57,058 | 65,473 | 44,430 |
| Percentage | 32.8% | 37.7% | 25.5% |
| Swing | ▼1.8% | ▼6.1% | ▲10.2% |
| | Fourth party |
| Party | Independent |
| Seats won | 4 |
| Seat change | ▲1 |
| Popular vote | 4,811 |
| Percentage | 2.8% |
| Swing | ▼0.5% |
- Results of the 1993 Suffolk County Council election.
Council control before election
Conservative
Council control after election
No overall control

The 1993 Suffolk County Council election was held on 6 May 1993 to elect members of Suffolk County Council in Suffolk, England. It was held on the same day as other local elections.

80 councillors were elected from various electoral divisions, which returned one county councillor each by first-past-the-post voting for a four-year term of office.

== Results summary ==
1993 Suffolk County Council election
| Party | Seats | Gains | Losses | Net gain/loss | Seats % | Votes % | Votes | +/− |
|---|---|---|---|---|---|---|---|---|
| Labour | 31 | 6 | 1 | ▲5 | 38.8 | 32.8 | 57,058 | –2.2 |
| Conservative | 25 | 1 | 20 | ▼19 | 32.5 | 37.6 | 65,473 | –6.2 |
| Liberal Democrats | 20 | 15 | 2 | ▲13 | 23.8 | 26.1 | 45,447 | +10.2 |
| Independent | 4 | 1 | 0 | ▲1 | 3.8 | 2.8 | 4,811 | -0.7 |
| Green | 0 | 0 | 0 | Steady | 0.0 | 0.5 | 936 | -1.9 |
| Residents | 0 | 0 | 0 | Steady | 0.0 | 0.3 | 464 | N/A |

=== Election of Group Leaders ===
Chris Mole (Ipswich Town) was re-elected leader of the Labour Group.

=== Election of Leader of the Council ===
Chris Mole the leader of the Labour group was duly elected leader of the council and formed a Labour/Lib Dem administration.

== Results by district ==
=== Babergh ===
Summary

Babergh District Summary
| Party | Seats | +/- | Votes | % | +/- |
|---|---|---|---|---|---|
| Liberal Democrats | 4 | ▲2 | 8,387 | 33.7 | +10.9 |
| Conservative | 2 | ▼5 | 9,305 | 37.4 | –5.4 |
| Labour | 2 | Steady | 5,549 | 22.3 | –5.7 |
| Independent | 1 | ▲1 | 1,647 | 6.6 | +1.7 |
| Total | 10 | Steady | 24,888 | 39.3 | –0.4 |

Division results

Belstead Brook
| Party | Candidate | Votes | % | ±% |
|---|---|---|---|---|
| Liberal Democrats | Anne Pollard | 2,029 | 71.3 | +40.3 |
| Conservative | Jill Swindin* | 816 | 28.7 | –19.4 |
| Majority | | 1,213 | 42.6 | |
| Turnout | | 2,845 | 36.0 | |
| Liberal Democrats gain from Conservative | | Swing | ▲29.9 | |

Brett
| Party | Candidate | Votes | % | ±% |
|---|---|---|---|---|
| Liberal Democrats | Michael Gleed | 1,009 | 43.1 | +18.3 |
| Conservative | Geoffrey Chantler * | 965 | 41.2 | +3.6 |
| Labour | Gerald Gould | 369 | 15.7 | +0.9 |
| Majority | | 44 | 1.9 | |
| Turnout | | 2,343 | 49.1 | |
| Liberal Democrats gain from Conservative | | Swing | ▲7.4 | |

Cosford
| Party | Candidate | Votes | % | ±% |
|---|---|---|---|---|
| Conservative | Tony Bailey-Smith | 779 | 66.6 | +13.5 |
| Liberal Democrats | David Everett | 390 | 33.4 | +2.2 |
| Majority | | 389 | 33.3 | |
| Turnout | | 1,169 | 26.6 | |
| Conservative hold | | Swing | ▲5.6 | |

Great Cornard
| Party | Candidate | Votes | % | ±% |
|---|---|---|---|---|
| Labour | Wilmoth Gibson * | 1,089 | 47.6 | –6.4 |
| Conservative | Peter Boor | 809 | 35.3 | –1.3 |
| Liberal Democrats | Lorna Hewett | 391 | 17.1 | +7.7 |
| Majority | | 280 | 12.2 | |
| Turnout | | 2,289 | 37.5 | |
| Labour hold | | Swing | ▼2.6 | |

Hadleigh
| Party | Candidate | Votes | % | ±% |
|---|---|---|---|---|
| Liberal Democrats | David Grutchfield * | 1,551 | 67.6 | +17.7 |
| Conservative | Eileen Banks | 542 | 23.6 | N/A |
| Labour | Val Waters | 200 | 8.7 | –6.5 |
| Majority | | 1,009 | 44.0 | |
| Turnout | | 2,293 | 43.0 | |
| Liberal Democrats hold | | Swing | N/A | |

Melford
| Party | Candidate | Votes | % | ±% |
|---|---|---|---|---|
| Independent | Richard Kemp | 1,647 | 56.8 | N/A |
| Conservative | Peter Stevens | 771 | 26.8 | −21.4 |
| Labour | Timothy Samuel | 482 | 16.6 | −8.7 |
| Majority | | 876 | 30.2 | |
| Turnout | | 2,900 | 40.5 | |
| Independent gain from Conservative | | Swing | N/A | |

Peninsula
| Party | Candidate | Votes | % | ±% |
|---|---|---|---|---|
| Liberal Democrats | Shirley Clarke | 1,027 | 46.2 | +13.5 |
| Conservative | J. Delves* | 934 | 42.0 | –6.9 |
| Labour | J. Sharman | 261 | 11.7 | −6.7 |
| Majority | | 93 | 4.2 | |
| Turnout | | 2,222 | 40.5 | |
| Liberal Democrats gain from Conservative | | Swing | ▲10.2 | |

Samford
| Party | Candidate | Votes | % | ±% |
|---|---|---|---|---|
| Liberal Democrats | Archie Carmichael | 1,355 | 48.9 | +12.7 |
| Conservative | William Curnow * | 1,014 | 36.6 | –8.1 |
| Labour | Anthony Bavington | 401 | 14.5 | –4.6 |
| Majority | | 341 | 12.3 | N/A |
| Turnout | | 2,770 | 47.7 | +1.3 |
| Registered electors | | 5,806 | | |
| Liberal Democrats gain from Conservative | | Swing | +10.4 | |

Stour Valley
| Party | Candidate | Votes | % | ±% |
|---|---|---|---|---|
| Conservative | Selwyn Pryor * | 1,395 | 50.9 | −6.7 |
| Labour | John Skinner | 712 | 26.0 | −2.3 |
| Liberal Democrats | Kenneth Watkins | 635 | 23.2 | +9.1 |
| Majority | | 683 | 24.9 | |
| Turnout | | 2,742 | 38.8 | |
| Conservative hold | | Swing | ▼2.2 | |

Sudbury
| Party | Candidate | Votes | % | ±% |
|---|---|---|---|---|
| Labour | Elizabeth Wiles * | 2,035 | 61.4 | +5.9 |
| Conservative | Sylvia Byham | 1,280 | 38.6 | −5.9 |
| Majority | | 755 | 22.8 | |
| Turnout | | 3,315 | 35.8 | |
| Labour hold | | Swing | ▲5.9 | |

=== Forest Heath ===
Forest Heath District Summary
| Party | Seats | +/- | Votes | % | +/- |
|---|---|---|---|---|---|
| Conservative | 4 | ▼1 | 3,845 | 45.0 | –7.6 |
| Liberal Democrats | 1 | ▲1 | 2,373 | 27.8 | N/A |
| Independent | 1 | Steady | 324 | 3.8 | –12.1 |
| Labour | 0 | Steady | 1,993 | 23.4 | –8.0 |
| Total | 6 | Steady | 8,535 | 25.0 | –3.5 |

Division results

Brandon
| Party | Candidate | Votes | % | ±% |
|---|---|---|---|---|
| Conservative | Bill Bishop | 1,074 | 59.2 | –3.5 |
| Labour | Nolan Guthrie | 527 | 29.1 | –8.2 |
| Liberal Democrats | William Ratcliffe | 212 | 11.7 | N/A |
| Majority | | 547 | 30.2 | |
| Turnout | | 1,813 | 30.5 | |
| Conservative hold | | Swing | ▲2.4 | |

Exning
| Party | Candidate | Votes | % | ±% |
|---|---|---|---|---|
| Liberal Democrats | Gene Echols | 1,184 | 66.3 | N/A |
| Conservative | Jane Andrews-Smith | 346 | 19.4 | –44.9 |
| Labour | Colim Muge | 256 | 14.3 | −21.4 |
| Majority | | 838 | 46.9 | |
| Turnout | | 1,786 | 27.3 | |
| Liberal Democrats gain from Conservative | | Swing | N/A | |

Ickneid
| Party | Candidate | Votes | % | ±% |
|---|---|---|---|---|
| Conservative | Fred Thomason * | 884 | 52.2 | −20.3 |
| Labour | Philip Kemp | 464 | 27.4 | −0.1 |
| Liberal Democrats | Margaret Brame | 347 | 20.5 | N/A |
| Majority | | 420 | 24.8 | |
| Turnout | | 1,695 | 31.7 | |
| Conservative hold | | Swing | ▼10.1 | |

Mildenhall
| Party | Candidate | Votes | % | ±% |
|---|---|---|---|---|
| Conservative | Roger Pendleton * | 605 | 41.1 | –1.1 |
| Labour | Stan Hale | 380 | 25.8 | –7.7 |
| Independent | John Barker | 324 | 22.0 | –2.3 |
| Liberal Democrats | K. McConnell | 162 | 11.0 | N/A |
| Majority | | 225 | 15.3 | |
| Turnout | | 1,471 | 27.1 | |
| Conservative hold | | Swing | ▲3.3 | |

Newmarket Town
| Party | Candidate | Votes | % | ±% |
|---|---|---|---|---|
| Conservative | Arthur Crickmere * | 936 | 52.9 | −12.5 |
| Liberal Democrats | David Griffith | 468 | 26.4 | N/A |
| Labour | Paul Dwane | 366 | 20.7 | −13.9 |
| Majority | | 468 | 26.4 | |
| Turnout | | 1,770 | 31.9 | |
| Conservative hold | | Swing | N/A | |

Row Heath
| Party | Candidate | Votes | % | ±% |
|---|---|---|---|---|
| Independent | Jack Haylock* | Unopposed | | |
| Majority | | N/A | N/A | |
| Turnout | | N/A | N/A | |
| Independent hold | | Swing | N/A | |

=== Ipswich ===
District Summary
| Party | Seats | +/- | Votes | % | +/- |
|---|---|---|---|---|---|
| Labour | 13 | Steady | 15,975 | 49.7 | –6.3 |
| Conservative | 4 | Steady | 11,730 | 36.5 | +0.5 |
| Liberal Democrats | 0 | Steady | 4,291 | 13.4 | +8.7 |
| Green | 0 | Steady | 135 | 0.4 | –3.0 |
| Total | 17 | Steady | 32,131 | 34.1 | –2.3 |

Division results

Bixley
| Party | Candidate | Votes | % | ±% |
|---|---|---|---|---|
| Conservative | Nina Alcock* | 1,295 | 57.7 | +2.0 |
| Labour | B. Maguire | 554 | 24.7 | +7.1 |
| Liberal Democrats | M. Skelcher | 397 | 17.7 | −2.6 |
| Majority | | 741 | 33.0 | |
| Turnout | | 2,246 | 39.7 | |
| Conservative hold | | Swing | ▼2.6 | |

Bridge
| Party | Candidate | Votes | % | ±% |
|---|---|---|---|---|
| Labour | Kenneth Doran* | 950 | 64.5 | −1.2 |
| Conservative | T. Yard | 388 | 26.3 | +3.6 |
| Green | J. Scott | 135 | 9.2 | −2.4 |
| Majority | | 562 | 38.2 | |
| Turnout | | 1,473 | 27.0 | |
| Labour hold | | Swing | ▼2.4 | |

Broom Hill
| Party | Candidate | Votes | % | ±% |
|---|---|---|---|---|
| Conservative | B. Pinner* | 798 | 48.6 | +3.8 |
| Labour | S. Mason | 558 | 34.0 | −1.7 |
| Liberal Democrats | P. Odell | 287 | 17.5 | +8.0 |
| Majority | | 240 | 14.6 | |
| Turnout | | 1,643 | 32.3 | |
| Conservative hold | | Swing | ▲2.8 | |

Castle Hill
| Party | Candidate | Votes | % | ±% |
|---|---|---|---|---|
| Conservative | A. Barker | 1,004 | 48.5 | −0.5 |
| Labour | C. De Carteret | 771 | 37.2 | +0.4 |
| Liberal Democrats | N. Ramsden | 295 | 14.3 | +9.1 |
| Majority | | 233 | 11.3 | |
| Turnout | | 2,070 | 35.9 | |
| Conservative hold | | Swing | ▼0.5 | |

Chantry
| Party | Candidate | Votes | % | ±% |
|---|---|---|---|---|
| Labour | Susan Thomas* | 996 | 52.9 | −24.6 |
| Conservative | P. Murray-Cowan | 888 | 47.1 | +24.6 |
| Majority | | 108 | 5.7 | |
| Turnout | | 1,884 | 40.6 | |
| Labour hold | | Swing | ▼24.6 | |

Gainsborough
| Party | Candidate | Votes | % | ±% |
|---|---|---|---|---|
| Labour | Ronald Sudds * | 980 | 50.8 | −29.9 |
| Liberal Democrats | J. White | 624 | 32.4 | N/A |
| Conservative | G. Morris | 324 | 16.8 | −2.5 |
| Majority | | 356 | 18.5 | |
| Turnout | | 1,928 | 32.8 | |
| Labour hold | | Swing | N/A | |

Ipswich St. Margarets
| Party | Candidate | Votes | % | ±% |
|---|---|---|---|---|
| Conservative | R. Coates | 1,108 | 41.7 | −12.3 |
| Liberal Democrats | R. Atkins | 969 | 36.5 | +28.5 |
| Labour | S. Reynolds | 577 | 21.7 | −16.3 |
| Majority | | 139 | 5.2 | |
| Turnout | | 2,654 | 45.8 | |
| Conservative hold | | Swing | ▼20.4 | |

Ipswich Town
| Party | Candidate | Votes | % | ±% |
|---|---|---|---|---|
| Labour | Chris Mole * | 972 | 61.2 | −2.6 |
| Conservative | D. Goldsmith | 417 | 26.3 | +1.7 |
| Liberal Democrats | H. Earle | 198 | 12.5 | N/A |
| Majority | | 555 | 35.0 | |
| Turnout | | 1,587 | 27.5 | |
| Labour hold | | Swing | ▼2.2 | |

Priory Heath
| Party | Candidate | Votes | % | ±% |
|---|---|---|---|---|
| Labour | Kenneth Wilson | 1,123 | 71.2 | −6.2 |
| Conservative | Stephen Lark | 455 | 28.8 | +6.2 |
| Majority | | 668 | 42.3 | |
| Turnout | | 1,578 | 29.2 | |
| Labour hold | | Swing | ▼6.2 | |

Rushmere
| Party | Candidate | Votes | % | ±% |
|---|---|---|---|---|
| Labour | Brian Le Grys | 1,242 | 48.7 | −2.8 |
| Conservative | S. Barker | 976 | 38.2 | −4.2 |
| Liberal Democrats | K. Kirkwood | 334 | 13.1 | +7.1 |
| Majority | | 266 | 10.4 | |
| Turnout | | 2,552 | 43.4 | |
| Labour hold | | Swing | ▲0.7 | |

Sprites
| Party | Candidate | Votes | % | ±% |
|---|---|---|---|---|
| Labour | Robin Sargent* | 1,201 | 73.5 | +6.8 |
| Conservative | R. Patient | 434 | 26.5 | +2.7 |
| Majority | | 767 | 46.9 | |
| Turnout | | 1,635 | 29.7 | |
| Labour hold | | Swing | ▲2.1 | |

St. Clements
| Party | Candidate | Votes | % | ±% |
|---|---|---|---|---|
| Labour | Brian Coleman * | 1,129 | 45.8 | −6.1 |
| Conservative | J. Morgan | 1,003 | 40.7 | −7.4 |
| Liberal Democrats | V. Finbow | 332 | 13.5 | N/A |
| Majority | | 126 | 5.1 | |
| Turnout | | 2,464 | 43.7 | |
| Labour hold | | Swing | ▲0.7 | |

St John's
| Party | Candidate | Votes | % | ±% |
|---|---|---|---|---|
| Labour | Michael Hyde* | 1,098 | 52.4 | −9.3 |
| Conservative | R. Harris | 726 | 34.6 | −3.7 |
| Liberal Democrats | N. Goodger | 272 | 13.0 | N/A |
| Majority | | 372 | 17.7 | |
| Turnout | | 2,096 | 35.1 | |
| Labour hold | | Swing | ▼2.8 | |

Stoke Park
| Party | Candidate | Votes | % | ±% |
|---|---|---|---|---|
| Labour | M. Campbell* | 955 | 51.1 | −3.3 |
| Conservative | P. West | 690 | 36.9 | −1.4 |
| Liberal Democrats | J. Delvin | 225 | 12.0 | +4.8 |
| Majority | | 265 | 14.2 | |
| Turnout | | 1,870 | 32.7 | |
| Labour hold | | Swing | ▼1.0 | |

Whitehouse
| Party | Candidate | Votes | % | ±% |
|---|---|---|---|---|
| Labour | C. Packard* | 979 | 63.7 | −2.9 |
| Conservative | Henry Davies | 412 | 26.8 | +2.1 |
| Liberal Democrats | M. Pakes | 147 | 9.6 | +4.5 |
| Majority | | 567 | 36.9 | |
| Turnout | | 1,538 | 28.6 | |
| Labour hold | | Swing | ▼2.5 | |

Whittington
| Party | Candidate | Votes | % | ±% |
|---|---|---|---|---|
| Labour | Jane Hore * | 988 | 60.9 | +3.2 |
| Conservative | David Collins | 424 | 26.1 | −6.9 |
| Liberal Democrats | Mirriam Carroll | 211 | 13.0 | +3.7 |
| Majority | | 564 | 34.8 | |
| Turnout | | 1,623 | 29.3 | |
| Labour hold | | Swing | ▲5.1 | |

Whitton
| Party | Candidate | Votes | % | ±% |
|---|---|---|---|---|
| Labour | Anthony Lewis | 902 | 69.9 | +2.2 |
| Conservative | R. Grimsey | 388 | 30.1 | +4.6 |
| Majority | | 514 | 39.8 | |
| Turnout | | 1,290 | 25.2 | |
| Labour hold | | Swing | ▼1.2 | |

=== Mid Suffolk ===
Mid Suffolk District Summary
| Party | Seats | +/- | Votes | % | +/- |
|---|---|---|---|---|---|
| Liberal Democrats | 6 | ▲5 | 9,139 | 38.6 | +16.3 |
| Labour | 3 | ▲1 | 5,680 | 24.0 | –3.6 |
| Conservative | 1 | ▼6 | 8,456 | 35.7 | –9.0 |
| Green | 0 | Steady | 401 | 1.7 | –1.7 |
| Total | 10 | Steady | 23,676 | 37.8 | –0.7 |

Division results

Bosmere
| Party | Candidate | Votes | % | ±% |
|---|---|---|---|---|
| Liberal Democrats | Rosalind Scott | 1,701 | 60.6 | +37.4 |
| Conservative | Phillip Redman | 749 | 26.7 | –27.0 |
| Labour | S. Griffiths | 356 | 12.7 | –10.4 |
| Majority | | 952 | 33.9 | |
| Turnout | | 2,806 | 42.4 | |
| Liberal Democrats gain from Conservative | | Swing | ▲32.2 | |

Gipping Valley
| Party | Candidate | Votes | % | ±% |
|---|---|---|---|---|
| Labour | Terry Wilson | 715 | 39.5 | +2.1 |
| Conservative | G. Boatfield | 701 | 38.7 | −9.3 |
| Liberal Democrats | T. Mayes | 394 | 21.8 | +7.2 |
| Majority | | 14 | 0.8 | |
| Turnout | | 1,810 | 29.9 | |
| Labour gain from Conservative | | Swing | ▲5.7 | |

Hartismere
| Party | Candidate | Votes | % | ±% |
|---|---|---|---|---|
| Liberal Democrats | Lesley Henniker-Major * | 1,402 | 47.7 | +7.3 |
| Conservative | Charles Michell | 917 | 31.2 | –4.2 |
| Labour | Terence O'Keefe | 621 | 21.1 | –3.2 |
| Majority | | 485 | 16.5 | |
| Turnout | | 2,940 | 45.0 | |
| Liberal Democrats hold | | Swing | ▲5.8 | |

Hoxne
| Party | Candidate | Votes | % | ±% |
|---|---|---|---|---|
| Liberal Democrats | Julie Craven | 1,319 | 46.3 | +22.7 |
| Conservative | Guy McGregor * | 1,165 | 40.9 | –15.0 |
| Labour | C. Hammond | 364 | 12.8 | –7.7 |
| Majority | | 154 | 5.4 | |
| Turnout | | 2,848 | 43.2 | |
| Liberal Democrats gain from Conservative | | Swing | ▲18.9 | |

Stowmarket St. Mary's
| Party | Candidate | Votes | % | ±% |
|---|---|---|---|---|
| Liberal Democrats | Alan Lower | 1,127 | 54.2 | +39.2 |
| Labour | Ernie Nunn * | 632 | 30.4 | –19.5 |
| Conservative | D. Burch | 321 | 15.4 | –15.9 |
| Majority | | 495 | 23.8 | |
| Turnout | | 2,080 | 39.1 | |
| Liberal Democrats gain from Labour | | Swing | ▲29.4 | |

Stowmarket St. Peter's
| Party | Candidate | Votes | % | ±% |
|---|---|---|---|---|
| Labour | Duncan Macpherson * | 817 | 49.8 | –9.9 |
| Liberal Democrats | Robert Cray | 454 | 27.7 | +16.0 |
| Conservative | W. Crane | 370 | 22.5 | –6.0 |
| Majority | | 363 | 22.1 | |
| Turnout | | 1,641 | 31.0 | |
| Labour hold | | Swing | ▼13.0 | |

Thedwastre North
| Party | Candidate | Votes | % | ±% |
|---|---|---|---|---|
| Conservative | Sue Sida-Lockett* | 1,203 | 60.4 | +8.9 |
| Labour | John Dougall | 790 | 39.6 | +24.5 |
| Majority | | 413 | 20.7 | |
| Turnout | | 1,993 | 30.2 | |
| Conservative hold | | Swing | ▼7.8 | |

Thedwastre South
| Party | Candidate | Votes | % | ±% |
|---|---|---|---|---|
| Liberal Democrats | Clive Ward | 1,354 | 56.0 | +22.7 |
| Conservative | E. Rogers | 1,065 | 44.0 | +1.8 |
| Majority | | 289 | 11.9 | |
| Turnout | | 2,419 | 36.5 | |
| Liberal Democrats gain from Conservative | | Swing | ▲10.5 | |

Thredling
| Party | Candidate | Votes | % | ±% |
|---|---|---|---|---|
| Liberal Democrats | Bernard Ward | 1,388 | 57.2 | +33.7 |
| Conservative | Jeremy Clover * | 1,039 | 42.8 | −14.2 |
| Majority | | 349 | 14.4 | |
| Turnout | | 2,427 | 37.0 | |
| Liberal Democrats gain from Conservative | | Swing | ▲24.0 | |

Upper Gipping
| Party | Candidate | Votes | % | ±% |
|---|---|---|---|---|
| Labour | Mike Shave | 1,385 | 51.1 | +24.4 |
| Conservative | B. Mayes | 926 | 34.1 | −6.4 |
| Green | Roger Stearn | 401 | 14.8 | N/A |
| Majority | | 459 | 16.9 | |
| Turnout | | 2,712 | 42.3 | |
| Labour gain from Conservative | | Swing | ▲15.4 | |

=== Suffolk Coastal ===
Suffolk Coastal District Summary
| Party | Seats | +/- | Votes | % | +/- |
|---|---|---|---|---|---|
| Conservative | 9 | ▼3 | 15,123 | 43.1 | –8.0 |
| Liberal Democrats | 3 | ▲2 | 10,830 | 30.8 | +13.0 |
| Labour | 2 | ▲1 | 8,762 | 25.0 | +0.5 |
| Green | 0 | Steady | 400 | 1.1 | –5.5 |
| Total | 14 | Steady | 35,115 | 40.0 | –0.9 |

Division results

Blything
| Party | Candidate | Votes | % | ±% |
|---|---|---|---|---|
| Conservative | H. Hall* | 1,102 | 49.9 | –2.0 |
| Labour | John Troughton | 464 | 21.0 | –2.5 |
| Liberal Democrats | M. Sheppard | 444 | 20.1 | N/A |
| Green | J. Berry | 199 | 9.0 | –15.6 |
| Majority | | 638 | 28.9 | |
| Turnout | | 2,209 | 42.8 | |
| Conservative hold | | Swing | ▲0.3 | |

Bungay
| Party | Candidate | Votes | % | ±% |
|---|---|---|---|---|
| Conservative | Morris Rose | 1,064 | 38.4 | −8.8 |
| Liberal Democrats | D. O'Neil | 867 | 31.3 | –21.5 |
| Labour | O. Parr | 838 | 30.3 | N/A |
| Majority | | 197 | 7.1 | |
| Turnout | | 2,769 | 45.8 | |
| Conservative gain from Liberal Democrats | | Swing | ▲6.4 | |

Carlford
| Party | Candidate | Votes | % | ±% |
|---|---|---|---|---|
| Conservative | Howard Bestow * | 1,241 | 48.5 | −23.3 |
| Liberal Democrats | D. Cooper | 1,022 | 40.0 | N/A |
| Labour | J. Hetherington | 294 | 11.5 | –16.7 |
| Majority | | 219 | 8.6 | |
| Turnout | | 2,557 | 39.1 | |
| Conservative hold | | Swing | N/A | |

Clay Hills
| Party | Candidate | Votes | % | ±% |
|---|---|---|---|---|
| Labour | Joan Girling | 1,692 | 59.6 | +22.6 |
| Conservative | Peter Batho * | 1,145 | 40.4 | −0.2 |
| Majority | | 547 | 19.3 | |
| Turnout | | 2,837 | 42.4 | |
| Labour gain from Conservative | | Swing | ▲11.4 | |

Colneis
| Party | Candidate | Votes | % | ±% |
|---|---|---|---|---|
| Conservative | A. Rodwell* | 1,364 | 52.1 | +3.9 |
| Labour | R. Senior | 676 | 25.8 | +7.6 |
| Liberal Democrats | R. Whitmore | 576 | 22.0 | +4.2 |
| Majority | | 688 | 26.3 | |
| Turnout | | 2,616 | 32.6 | |
| Conservative hold | | Swing | ▲1.9 | |

Felixstowe Ferry
| Party | Candidate | Votes | % | ±% |
|---|---|---|---|---|
| Conservative | M. Goodman | 1,296 | 52.6 | −8.2 |
| Labour | N. Finlayson | 597 | 24.2 | +4.2 |
| Liberal Democrats | P. Warren | 573 | 23.2 | +4.0 |
| Majority | | 699 | 28.3 | |
| Turnout | | 2,466 | 41.8 | |
| Conservative hold | | Swing | ▼6.2 | |

Felixstowe Landguard
| Party | Candidate | Votes | % | ±% |
|---|---|---|---|---|
| Liberal Democrats | Cherrie Macgregor | 1,147 | 52.0 | +24.4 |
| Conservative | Thomas Savage * | 653 | 29.6 | –12.2 |
| Labour | Martin Walker | 406 | 18.4 | –12.2 |
| Majority | | 494 | 22.4 | |
| Turnout | | 2,206 | 33.4 | |
| Liberal Democrats gain from Conservative | | Swing | ▲18.3 | |

Felixstowe Walton
| Party | Candidate | Votes | % | ±% |
|---|---|---|---|---|
| Labour | Don Smith * | 1,162 | 45.6 | +3.6 |
| Conservative | M. Minns | 927 | 36.4 | –5.5 |
| Liberal Democrats | Pamela Dangerfield | 461 | 18.1 | +2.1 |
| Majority | | 235 | 9.2 | |
| Turnout | | 2,550 | 46.3 | |
| Labour hold | | Swing | ▲4.6 | |

Framlingham
| Party | Candidate | Votes | % | ±% |
|---|---|---|---|---|
| Conservative | D. Mangan* | 973 | 47.5 | +0.6 |
| Liberal Democrats | Helen Whitworth | 509 | 24.9 | +17.7 |
| Labour | J. Stringer | 365 | 17.8 | −10.6 |
| Green | R. Stewart | 201 | 9.8 | –7.7 |
| Majority | | 464 | 22.7 | |
| Turnout | | 2,048 | 36.4 | |
| Conservative hold | | Swing | ▲8.6 | |

Kesgrave & Martlesham
| Party | Candidate | Votes | % | ±% |
|---|---|---|---|---|
| Conservative | Christopher Penn* | 1,345 | 44.2 | −20.2 |
| Liberal Democrats | John Kelso | 1,170 | 38.4 | N/A |
| Labour | M. Irwin | 529 | 17.4 | –18.2 |
| Majority | | 175 | 5.7 | |
| Turnout | | 3,044 | 35.5 | |
| Conservative hold | | Swing | N/A | |

Plomesgate
| Party | Candidate | Votes | % | ±% |
|---|---|---|---|---|
| Conservative | Ronald Ward | 1,055 | 43.7 | –16.5 |
| Liberal Democrats | W. Moss | 907 | 37.5 | +15.4 |
| Labour | Terry Hodgson | 453 | 18.8 | +1.2 |
| Majority | | 148 | 6.1 | |
| Turnout | | 2,415 | 45.7 | |
| Conservative hold | | Swing | ▼16.0 | |

Wickham
| Party | Candidate | Votes | % | ±% |
|---|---|---|---|---|
| Conservative | C. Cowper | 1,040 | 44.8 | −9.1 |
| Liberal Democrats | Bryan Hall | 671 | 28.9 | +8.2 |
| Labour | M. Caddick | 613 | 26.4 | +1.1 |
| Majority | | 369 | 15.9 | |
| Turnout | | 2,324 | 36.2 | |
| Conservative hold | | Swing | ▼8.7 | |

Wilford
| Party | Candidate | Votes | % | ±% |
|---|---|---|---|---|
| Liberal Democrats | Peter Monk | 1,090 | 48.1 | +11.3 |
| Conservative | R. Sheephanks* | 911 | 40.2 | −7.1 |
| Labour | C. Hemming | 267 | 11.8 | −4.1 |
| Majority | | 179 | 7.9 | |
| Turnout | | 2,268 | 42.3 | |
| Liberal Democrats gain from Conservative | | Swing | ▲9.2 | |

Woodbridge
| Party | Candidate | Votes | % | ±% |
|---|---|---|---|---|
| Liberal Democrats | Michael Eveleigh | 1,393 | 49.6 | +26.7 |
| Conservative | B. Rosher* | 1,007 | 35.9 | −6.0 |
| Labour | Roy Burgon | 406 | 14.5 | −5.4 |
| Majority | | 386 | 13.8 | |
| Turnout | | 2,806 | 46.6 | |
| Liberal Democrats gain from Conservative | | Swing | ▲16.4 | |

=== St. Edmundsbury ===
St Edmundsbury District Summary
| Party | Seats | +/- | Votes | % | +/- |
|---|---|---|---|---|---|
| Conservative | 5 | ▼3 | 9,558 | 40.6 | –9.7 |
| Labour | 3 | ▲1 | 6,750 | 28.7 | –3.6 |
| Liberal Democrats | 3 | ▲2 | 7,176 | 30.4 | +14.2 |
| Residents | 0 | Steady | 60 | 0.3 | N/A |
| Total | 11 | Steady | 23,544 | 33.4 | –2.1 |

Division results

Abbeygate & Eastgate
| Party | Candidate | Votes | % | ±% |
|---|---|---|---|---|
| Conservative | Elizabeth Oliver * | 1,176 | 52.5 | –9.9 |
| Labour | P. Smithers | 540 | 24.1 | –13.5 |
| Liberal Democrats | B. Wesley | 525 | 23.4 | N/A |
| Majority | | 636 | 28.4 | |
| Turnout | | 2,241 | 32.0 | |
| Conservative hold | | Swing | ▲1.8 | |

Blackbourn
| Party | Candidate | Votes | % | ±% |
|---|---|---|---|---|
| Conservative | Joanna Spicer * | 1,416 | 51.5 | +5.3 |
| Labour | Joseph Moore | 843 | 30.7 | +9.2 |
| Liberal Democrats | J. Smith | 490 | 17.8 | −4.3 |
| Majority | | 573 | 20.8 | |
| Turnout | | 2,749 | 37.7 | |
| Conservative hold | | Swing | ▼2.0 | |

Clare
| Party | Candidate | Votes | % | ±% |
|---|---|---|---|---|
| Liberal Democrats | Rosemary Warmington | 993 | 50.7 | +30.2 |
| Conservative | Helen Benckendorff | 967 | 49.3 | −6.7 |
| Majority | | 26 | 1.3 | |
| Turnout | | 1,960 | 33.6 | |
| Liberal Democrats gain from Conservative | | Swing | ▲18.5 | |

Haverhill North
| Party | Candidate | Votes | % | ±% |
|---|---|---|---|---|
| Labour | Laurence Kiernan * | 1,250 | 73.4 | +11.4 |
| Conservative | lan Dowling | 454 | 26.6 | –11.4 |
| Majority | | 796 | 46.7 | |
| Turnout | | 1,704 | 24.6 | |
| Labour hold | | Swing | ▲11.4 | |

Haverhill South
| Party | Candidate | Votes | % | ±% |
|---|---|---|---|---|
| Liberal Democrats | Colin Jones * | 1,266 | 56.1 | +3.6 |
| Labour | Peter Denning | 671 | 29.8 | −1.2 |
| Conservative | Jane Burton | 258 | 11.4 | −5.2 |
| Residents | Henry Chenery | 60 | 2.7 | N/A |
| Majority | | 595 | 26.4 | |
| Turnout | | 2,255 | 29.9 | |
| Liberal Democrats hold | | Swing | ▲2.4 | |

Northgate & St. Olave's
| Party | Candidate | Votes | % | ±% |
|---|---|---|---|---|
| Labour | David Lockwood * | 1,235 | 77.6 | –1.8 |
| Conservative | Ann Williams | 208 | 13.1 | –7.5 |
| Liberal Democrats | Andrea Williams | 149 | 9.4 | N/A |
| Majority | | 1,027 | 64.5 | |
| Turnout | | 1,592 | 30.2 | |
| Labour hold | | Swing | ▲2.9 | |

Risbridge
| Party | Candidate | Votes | % | ±% |
|---|---|---|---|---|
| Conservative | John Burgess | 1,210 | 53.1 | −4.0 |
| Liberal Democrats | Margaret Wilman | 574 | 25.2 | N/A |
| Labour | Stella Rosenoff | 493 | 21.7 | +8.1 |
| Majority | | 636 | 27.9 | |
| Turnout | | 2,277 | 38.2 | |
| Conservative hold | | Swing | N/A | |

Risbybridge & Sextons
| Party | Candidate | Votes | % | ±% |
|---|---|---|---|---|
| Labour | Ray Nowak | 816 | 42.2 | –4.6 |
| Conservative | Derek Speakman | 758 | 39.2 | −14.0 |
| Liberal Democrats | Richard Ellis | 360 | 18.6 | N/A |
| Majority | | 58 | 3.0 | |
| Turnout | | 1,934 | 35.1 | |
| Labour gain from Conservative | | Swing | ▲4.7 | |

Southgate & Westgate
| Party | Candidate | Votes | % | ±% |
|---|---|---|---|---|
| Liberal Democrats | Brian Bagnall | 2,019 | 66.5 | +25.9 |
| Conservative | C. Hilder | 1,015 | 33.5 | −25.9 |
| Majority | | 1,004 | 33.1 | |
| Turnout | | 3,034 | 37.3 | |
| Liberal Democrats gain from Conservative | | Swing | ▲25.9 | |

Thingoe North
| Party | Candidate | Votes | % | ±% |
|---|---|---|---|---|
| Conservative | Jose Pereira * | 1,386 | 56.1 | –14.9 |
| Liberal Democrats | Mary Black | 548 | 22.2 | N/A |
| Labour | R. Bridge | 537 | 21.7 | –7.3 |
| Majority | | 838 | 33.9 | |
| Turnout | | 2,471 | 36.4 | |
| Conservative hold | | Swing | N/A | |

Thingoe South
| Party | Candidate | Votes | % | ±% |
|---|---|---|---|---|
| Conservative | Elizabeth Milburn * | 709 | 53.5 | –14.2 |
| Labour | Geraldine Hanger | 365 | 27.5 | –4.8 |
| Liberal Democrats | Jean Rogers | 252 | 19.0 | N/A |
| Majority | | 344 | 25.9 | |
| Turnout | | 1,326 | 31.6 | |
| Conservative hold | | Swing | ▼4.7 | |

=== Waveney ===
Waveney District Summary
| Party | Seats | +/- | Votes | % | +/- |
|---|---|---|---|---|---|
| Labour | 8 | <▲2 | 12,349 | 47.7 | +12.3 |
| Conservative | 2 | ▼1 | 7,457 | 28.8 | –7.0 |
| Independent | 2 | > | 2,840 | 11.0 | +2.4 |
| Liberal Democrats | 0 | ▼1 | 3,251 | 12.6 | –7.1 |
| Total | 12 | Steady | 25,897 | 35.0 | –3.4 |

Division results

Beccles
| Party | Candidate | Votes | % | ±% |
|---|---|---|---|---|
| Labour | Harold Ley* | 1,351 | 67.1 | +28.7 |
| Conservative | P. Sanders | 661 | 32.9 | −3.5 |
| Majority | | 690 | 34.3 | |
| Turnout | | 2,012 | 35.9 | |
| Labour hold | | Swing | ▲16.1 | |

Gunton
| Party | Candidate | Votes | % | ±% |
|---|---|---|---|---|
| Conservative | B. Harvey* | 926 | 48.6 | +5.5 |
| Labour | Robert Durrant | 534 | 28.0 | +9.4 |
| Liberal Democrats | Anthony Tibbitt | 444 | 23.3 | −15.0 |
| Majority | | 392 | 20.6 | |
| Turnout | | 1,904 | 36.6 | |
| Conservative hold | | Swing | ▼2.0 | |

Halesworth
| Party | Candidate | Votes | % | ±% |
|---|---|---|---|---|
| Labour | D. Thomas | 1,194 | 48.4 | N/A |
| Conservative | M. Nichols | 1,023 | 41.4 | +9.7 |
| Liberal Democrats | Brian Howe | 252 | 10.2 | –58.0 |
| Majority | | 171 | 6.9 | N/a |
| Turnout | | 2,469 | 45.7 | –1.6 |
| Registered electors | | 5,404 | | |
| Labour gain from Liberal Democrats | | Swing | +53.2 | |

Lothingland North
| Party | Candidate | Votes | % | ±% |
|---|---|---|---|---|
| Labour | Brian Hunter | 1,403 | 54.5 | +10.0 |
| Conservative | A. Choveaux | 924 | 35.9 | −8.2 |
| Liberal Democrats | B. Batchelder | 245 | 9.5 | –1.8 |
| Majority | | 479 | 18.6 | +18.2 |
| Turnout | | 2,572 | 36.6 | +1.2 |
| Registered electors | | 7,021 | | |
| Labour hold | | Swing | ▲9.1 | |

Lothingland South
| Party | Candidate | Votes | % | ±% |
|---|---|---|---|---|
| Independent | James Mitchell * | 1,207 | 48.8 | +11.0 |
| Labour | R. Anderson | 688 | 27.8 | −0.4 |
| Conservative | S. Burroughes | 576 | 23.3 | −10.7 |
| Majority | | 519 | 21.0 | |
| Turnout | | 2,471 | 31.5 | |
| Independent hold | | Swing | ▲5.7 | |

Lowestoft Central
| Party | Candidate | Votes | % | ±% |
|---|---|---|---|---|
| Labour | Nye Owen* | 1,275 | 65.7 | +2.3 |
| Liberal Democrats | Andrew Shepherd | 380 | 19.6 | +0.9 |
| Conservative | L. Guy | 285 | 14.7 | –3.2 |
| Majority | | 895 | 46.1 | +1.3 |
| Turnout | | 1,940 | 30.3 | +0.0 |
| Registered electors | | 6,396 | | |
| Labour hold | | Swing | +0.7 | |

Lowestoft St. Margarets
| Party | Candidate | Votes | % | ±% |
|---|---|---|---|---|
| Labour | Marie Rodgers * | 1,045 | 68.8 | +3.1 |
| Conservative | J. Albrow | 300 | 19.8 | −4.4 |
| Liberal Democrats | D. Tregloyne | 173 | 11.4 | +1.3 |
| Majority | | 745 | 49.1 | |
| Turnout | | 1,518 | 28.0 | |
| Labour hold | | Swing | ▲3.8 | |

Normanston
| Party | Candidate | Votes | % | ±% |
|---|---|---|---|---|
| Labour | Tom Chipperfield * | 1,621 | 81.3 | −0.8 |
| Conservative | Peter Browne | 232 | 11.6 | −6.3 |
| Liberal Democrats | Sandra Tonge | 140 | 7.0 | N/A |
| Majority | | 1,389 | 69.7 | |
| Turnout | | 1,993 | 32.0 | |
| Labour hold | | Swing | ▲2.8 | |

Oulton Broad
| Party | Candidate | Votes | % | ±% |
|---|---|---|---|---|
| Conservative | Nick Brighouse * | 1,054 | 45.2 | −1.5 |
| Labour | J. Riches | 903 | 38.7 | +9.8 |
| Liberal Democrats | Arnold Martin | 374 | 16.0 | +0.1 |
| Majority | | 151 | 6.5 | |
| Turnout | | 2,331 | 34.0 | |
| Conservative hold | | Swing | ▼5.7 | |

Pakefield
| Party | Candidate | Votes | % | ±% |
|---|---|---|---|---|
| Labour | Roger Bellham | 1,426 | 59.6 | +8.4 |
| Liberal Democrats | David Young | 839 | 35.0 | +25.3 |
| Conservative | E. Torlot | 129 | 5.4 | −33.7 |
| Majority | | 586 | 24.5 | |
| Turnout | | 2,394 | 33.1 | |
| Labour hold | | Swing | ▼8.5 | |

Southwold
| Party | Candidate | Votes | % | ±% |
|---|---|---|---|---|
| Independent | Graham Langley * | 1,633 | 71.6 | +4.9 |
| Conservative | S. Simpson | 648 | 28.4 | −4.9 |
| Majority | | 985 | 43.2 | |
| Turnout | | 2,281 | 44.7 | |
| Independent hold | | Swing | ▲4.9 | |

Wainford
| Party | Candidate | Votes | % | ±% |
|---|---|---|---|---|
| Labour | John Taylor | 909 | 45.2 | +1.7 |
| Conservative | Paul Newson | 699 | 34.7 | −11.3 |
| Liberal Democrats | E. Crisp | 404 | 20.1 | +9.6 |
| Majority | | 210 | 10.4 | |
| Turnout | | 2,012 | 35.5 | |
| Labour gain from Conservative | | Swing | ▲6.5 | |
