= Bonny Wood =

Nature reserve in Suffolk, England

Coordinates: 52.131°N 1.032°E

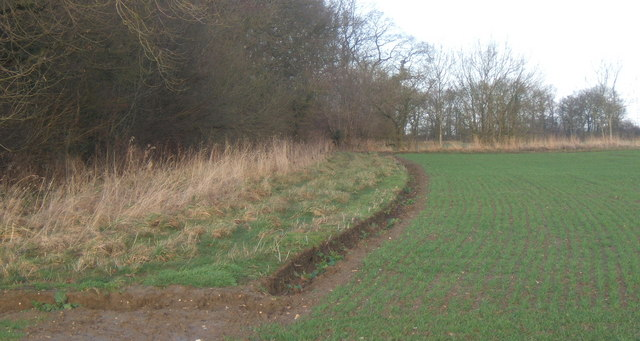
- Interactive map of Bonny Wood
- Type: Nature reserve
- Location: Barking Tye, Suffolk
- OS grid: TM076524
- Area: 20 hectares (49 acres)
- Manager: Suffolk Wildlife Trust

Bonny Wood is a 20 hectare nature reserve east of Barking Tye in Suffolk. It is managed by the Suffolk Wildlife Trust. The site is part of the Barking Woods biological Site of Special Scientific Interest.

Orchids in this coppiced wood include early-purples, lesser twayblades, common spotteds and greater butterflies. There are many birds, badgers and deer.

There is access by a footpath from Barking Village Hall.
