= Ringshall =

Ringshall is the name of more than one place.

In the United Kingdom:

- Ringshall, Berkhamsted, a hamlet on the border between Hertfordshire and Buckinghamshire
- Ringshall, Suffolk
- Ringshall Stocks, Suffolk
