= Samuel Reed =

Samuel Reed may refer to:

- Samuel B. Reed (1834–?), American architect
- Samuel M. Reed (1901–1996), American businessman
- Sam Reed, American accountant and politician
- Sam Reed (musician)
- Sam Reed (footballer)

== See also ==
- Samuel Read (1815–1883), English illustrator
- Samuel Reid (disambiguation)
