= Old Town Hall, Needham Market =

Municipal building in Southwold, Suffolk, England

Old Town Hall
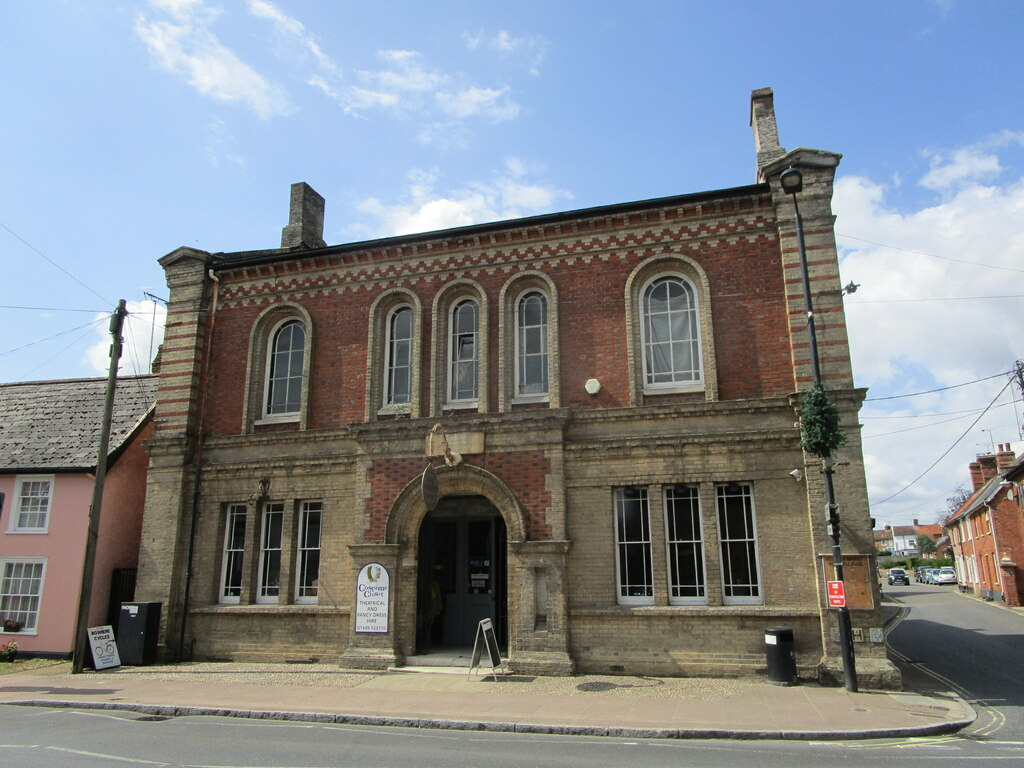
- Old Town Hall, Needham Market

- Shown in Suffolk
- 52.1535°N 1.0518°E
- Location: High Street, Needham Market

History
- Built: 1866

Site notes
- Architect: Frederick Barnes
- Architectural style: Italianate style

Listed Building – Grade II
- Official name: The Old Town Hall
- Designated: 24 August 1977
- Reference no.: 1253656

The Old Town Hall is a municipal building in the High Street in Needham Market, Suffolk, England. The building, which now accommodates an antiques centre and other shops, is a Grade II listed building.

== History ==
The building was commissioned by a group of businessmen, led by Admiral Sir George Broke-Middleton of Shrubland Hall, who set up a private company to finance and commission a municipal building for the benefit of the town. The site they selected, which was in the High Street, was occupied by a cottage which had been the birthplace of the artist, Samuel Read. The building was designed by Frederick Barnes in the Italianate style, built by a local contractor, H. Godfrey, in red and buff bricks at a cost of £1,300 and was completed in late 1866.

The design involved a symmetrical main frontage with three bays facing onto the High Street. The central bay, which slightly projected forward at ground floor level, featured a round headed entrance with imposts supporting an architrave: there were three deeply-recessed narrow round headed windows on the first floor. The outer bays were fenestrated by tripartite sash windows on the ground floor and by single deeply-recessed round headed windows on the first floor. At roof level, there was a parapet and a modillioned cornice, while the corners were decorated by full-height piers surmounted by small pediments. Internally, the principal rooms were the lecture room, which was at the front of the building on the first floor, a courtroom, a public library and a reading room. There were also offices for the local police officers and a lock-up for petty criminals.

A commemorative stone, recording Broke-Middleton's patronage, as well as the names of the architect and the builder, was installed above the entrance by Broke-Middleton himself in June 1866. The architectural historian, Nikolaus Pevsner, was unimpressed with the design and referred to it as "a sad building of yellow and red brick with lean round arches".

In the 19th century, the courtroom was used for fortnightly petty session hearings for the Bosmere and Claydon Hundred, one of the ancient hundreds of Suffolk. During the Second World War, the town hall narrowly missed being demolished on 19 October 1942 when a German bomb fell on a site just to the south of the building, killing four civilians and injuring many more. The company which had financed and commissioned the building was wound-up in 1948 and the building was subsequently converted for commercial use: it has since been used by a variety of local businesses including a publishing house and an antiques centre.
