= Barking and Somersham Ward =

Electoral ward of Mid Suffolk, England

The candidate information for the Barking and Somersham Ward in Mid-Suffolk, Suffolk, England.

== Councillors ==
Election	Member	Party
2011	Stephen Wright	Suffolk Together
2015	David Card	Conservative

== 2011 Results ==
Candidate name:	Party:	Votes:	% of votes:
Wright, Stephen	Suffolk Together	493	53.35
Smith, Jeremy	Conservative	310	33.55
Payne, David	Liberal Democrat	121	13.10

== 2015 Results ==
The turnout of the election was 72.38%.

Candidate name:	Party name:	Votes:	% of votes:
David CARD	Conservative	542	41.66
Stephen WRIGHT	Suffolk Together	411	31.59
Melanie COMBSTOCK	UKIP	194	14.91
Paul THOMAS	Liberal Democrat	154	11.84

== See also ==
- Mid Suffolk local elections
