= Baron Scott =

Baron Scott may refer to

- Baron Scott of Tynedale, a subsidiary title of James Scott, 1st Duke of Monmouth (1649–1685), and see Duke of Buccleuch
- Walter Scott, Baron Scott of Buccleuch (born and died 1648)
- Charles Montagu-Scott, Baron Scott of Tynedale, later Charles Montagu-Scott, 4th Duke of Buccleuch (1773–1819)
- Baron Scott of Whitchester and Eskdale, see also Duke of Buccleuch
- Richard Scott, Baron Scott of Foscote (born 1934), British barrister and peer

== See also ==
- Jane Scott, Baroness Scott of Bybrook
- Rosalind Scott, Baroness Scott of Needham Market
