= Baroness Scott =

Baroness Scott may refer to:

- Jane Scott, Baroness Scott of Bybrook (born 1947), British politician
- Rosalind Scott, Baroness Scott of Needham Market (born 1957), British politician
