= Frederick Barnes (architect) =

British architect

Frederick Barnes (1814–1898) was a British architect who is best remembered for his work on railway stations in East Anglia.

== Early life ==
Frederick (sometimes Frederic) Barnes was born in the London Borough of Hackney in 1814, although the exact date is uncertain. Barnes attended Christ's Hospital which was located at Hertford at the time and his father was a teacher at the school. After leaving school he worked in London and was articled to a prominent London architect Sydney Smirke. After that Barnes worked in Liverpool for several years.

== Career ==
Barnes moved to Ipswich in 1843 to assist his friend, locally-based architect John Medland Clark (1813–1849) on the construction of new Custom House building located in the Ipswich Docks. Medland Clark had won a competition for the design of the building which today is the finest building on Ipswich Waterfront.

During the 1840s Barnes was working with two of the nascent East Anglian Railways – the Eastern Union Railway and the Ipswich and Bury Railway alongside engineer Peter Bruff. Here he was responsible for several station buildings including Ipswich's first railway station at Stoke Hill (since demolished). Some well-regarded examples survive at Needham Market, Stowmarket and Bury St Edmunds. During this period he also worked closely with Sancton Wood whom he had known when they worked for Sidney Smirke. Sancton Wood is often jointly credited with Barnes on the design of some stations which are in a Jacobean style.

Following the death of Medland Clarke in 1849, Barnes opened his own practice the following year located at 13 Lower Brook Street, Ipswich. He also lived in the property and the census of 1851 recorded his wife and a servant at the same address. One of his first commissions was for Charles Stewart for Thurleston Lodge in Henley Road, Ipswich which was built in 1852.

Between 1848 and 1854 Barnes exhibited three architectural paintings at the Royal Academy, one of which was of Needham Market railway station.

During the 1850s and 1860s Barnes continued working on railway stations, church restorations and between 1854 and 1874 built a number of Suffolk schools.

In the 1871 census Barnes was still working as an architect and living at 13 Lower Brook Street, Ipswich. He later moved his office to Hatton Court, Ipswich and in 1888 had one of the largest architectural practices in the town.

Frederick and Caroline lived at Mill Hill, a large house he designed in 1875 at 61 Anglesea Road in Ipswich. (Note: Two sources claim he was living with Suzanne who is believed to be one of his two sisters who also lived with him in later life.)

== Table of selected works ==
The table is an incomplete list of Barnes' more significant works and is laid out in chronological order.

Building	Year	Comments
Ipswich Stoke Hill railway station	1843	Commissioned by Peter Bruff – station closed in 1860. Site became part of Ipswich engine shed and adjacent wagon works. Now a housing estate.
Bury St Edmunds railway station	1846	In use 2018
Bury St Edmunds railway bridge out Northgate	1846	In use 2018
Elmswell railway station	1846/7	Demolished in 1974
Thurston railway station	1846/7	Building extant in 2017 although not in railway use
United Reformed/Baptist Church Ipswich	1857	?
Presbyterian Church, Barrack Corner, Ipswich	1865–1870	Now known as Ipswich International Church.
Crown Street Congregational Church Ipswich	1865?	Now demolished
Woodbridge railway station	c1858	Building extant in 2017 although not in railway use.
Bealings railway station	c1858	Building extant in 2017 although not in railway use.
Foxwarren Park	1860	Located in Wisley, Sussex. Said to be in "harsh Victorian Gothic style".
Wesleyan Methodist Church, Museum Street, Ipswich	1860	in Gothic Revival style
Needham Market station	1849	Building extant in 2017 although not in railway use
Congregational Church, Lion Walk, Colchester	1863	Tower only extant in 2017 remainder demolished 1970s.
All Saints Church, Sproughton	1863–1868	Partial Victorian modernisation of east end of 14th Century church.
The Town Hall, Needham Market, Suffolk	1866	Now known as the "Old Town Hall"
Church of St Andrew, Melton, Woodbridge	1866–1868	Restoration of older structure
Framlingham School chapel	1875	Designed and built in conjunction with then partner E F Bishopp.
Chillesford Lodge Model Farm	1875	PA model farm of 1875, built for Sir Richard Wallace Baronet and designed by Frederick Barnes, comprising a main complex of farm buildings and detached structures
All Saints Church, Sudbourne	1878	Restoration of older structure.
Congregational Church, Lion Walk, Colchester	1883	Partial rebuild after 1883 earthquake

== Death ==
Caroline Barnes died on 19 March 1888 and was buried in Ipswich Cemetery. Frederick died on 6 December 1898 and is buried with his wife. The gravestone is believed to have been designed by him.
