= Samuel Reid =

Samuel, Sam or Sammy Reid may refer to:

- Samuel Chester Reid (1783–1861), American naval officer
- Samuel E. Reid (1854–1924), Canadian politician
- Sam Reid (actor) (born 1987), Australian actor
- Sam Reid (Doctors), fictional character
- Sam Reid (musician) (born 1963), keyboardist with Glass Tiger
- Three Australian rules footballers:
  - Sam Reid (footballer, born 1872) (1872–?), footballer for the Carlton Football Club in 1897
  - Sam Reid (footballer, born 1989), footballer for the Greater Western Sydney Giants, drafted in 2007
  - Sam Reid (footballer, born 1991), footballer for the Sydney Swans, drafted in 2009
- Sammy Reid (1939–2014), Scottish footballer, goalscorer when Berwick Rangers defeated (Glasgow) Rangers in the 1966–67 Scottish Cup

== See also ==
- Samuel Reed (disambiguation)
