= Darmsden =

Hamlet in Suffolk, England

Coordinates: 52.142128°N 1.069432°E

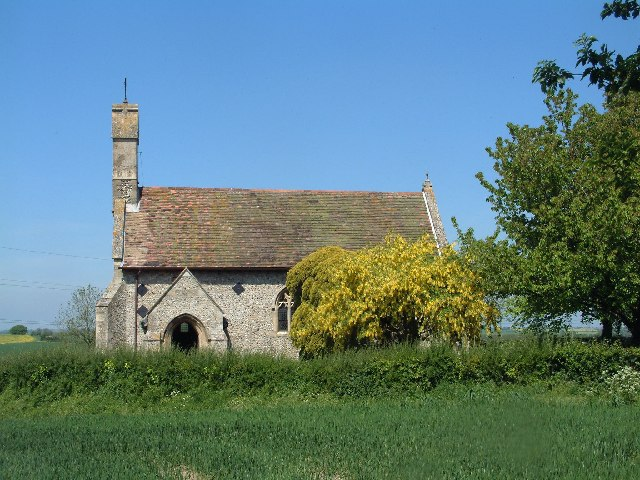
- St Andrew's Church

- Location within Suffolk
- OS grid reference: TM0953
- Civil parish: Darmsden
- District: Mid Suffolk
- Shire county: Suffolk
- Region: East
- Country: England
- Sovereign state: United Kingdom
- Post town: IPSWICH
- Postcode district: IP6
- Dialling code: 01449
- Police: Suffolk
- Fire: Suffolk
- Ambulance: East of England
- UK Parliament: Central Suffolk and North Ipswich

Darmsden is a hamlet and civil parish in the Mid Suffolk district of Suffolk, England. Located near the A14 road around 2 kilometres (1 mi) south of the town of Needham Market, it became a civil parish in April 2013 after separating from Barking.

The hamlet is on a private estate and has no public roads, although the main estate road linked to the B1113 is open to all.
