= St Mary's Church, Badley =

Coordinates: 52.1630°N 1.0140°E

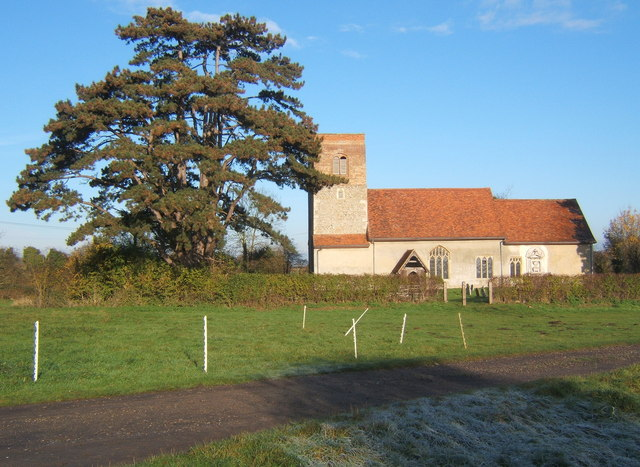
- St Mary's Church, Badley, from the south

- Location in Suffolk
- OS grid reference: TM 062 559
- Location: Badley, Suffolk
- Country: England
- Denomination: Anglican
- Website: Churches Conservation Trust

Architecture
- Functional status: Redundant
- Heritage designation: Grade I
- Designated: 9 December 1955
- Architectural type: Church
- Style: Gothic

Specifications
- Materials: Flint and brick with freestone dressings Roofs tiled

St Mary's Church is a redundant Anglican church in the village of Badley, Suffolk, England. It is recorded in the National Heritage List for England as a designated Grade I listed building, and is under the care of the Churches Conservation Trust. The church is located some 3 miles (5 km) southeast of Stowmarket on the west side of the B1113 road, and is approached by a track about a mile long.

== History ==
The oldest fabric in the church dates from about 1200, although most of it was built in the 15th century. The roofs date from the early 16th century, and the top stage of the tower was rebuilt during that century. The south porch was added in the 14th century, but it was largely rebuilt in the 20th century.

== Architecture ==
=== Exterior ===
The church is constructed mainly in flint rubble, with the south and east sides rendered. The tower is in flint and brick rubble, with the top stage in orange brick. The dressings are in freestone. The roofs are tiled. The plan of the church consists of a nave with a south porch, a chancel and a west tower. The south doorway dates from about 1200. Most of the windows are from the 15th century and have three lights, although the west window is large with five lights, and there is a lancet window dating from about 1200 in the north chancel wall.

=== Interior ===
The font dates from the 13th century and is made in Purbeck marble. It has an octagonal bowl and a 17th-century oak cover with an acorn finial. The pews date from the 15th to the 17th century. Most of them are from the 16th century, although there is a bench from the 15th century with animals carved on its buttresses. Part of a 15th-century rood screen has been incorporated in 17th-century box pews. They were augmented and rearranged in the 17th century, and have been untouched since the 18th century. The pulpit dates from the 17th century; it is plain but has a reading desk decorated with arcading. The communion rails are in iron and date from about 1830. In the sanctuary are 18th-century panels with the Ten Commandments, the Lord's Prayer and the Creed. Inside the south door is a 13th-century coffin-shaped slab. Many of the memorials in the church are to the Poley family. There is a wall memorial in the chancel to Edmund Poley who died in 1548, and to other family members. Above it are a coloured achievement and obelisks. Another monument, in Baroque style, is to Sir Henry Poley who died in 1707. There is a total of 17 floor slabs in the chancel and nave, most of which are memorials to the Poleys. The single-manual, five-stop organ was built by Bevington.

== External features ==
The churchyard contains the war grave of an airman of World War II.

== See also ==
- List of churches preserved by the Churches Conservation Trust in the East of England
