= Ringshall Ward =

Former electoral ward in Suffolk, England

The candidate information for the Ringshall Ward in Mid-Suffolk, Suffolk, England.

== Councillors ==
Election	Member	Party
2011	Patricia Godden	Liberal Democrats
2015	David Whybrow	Conservative

== 2011 Results ==
Candidate name:	Party:	Votes:	% of votes:
Godden, Patricia	Liberal Democrat	528	50.97
Whybrow, David	Conservative	508	49.03

== 2015 Results ==
The turnout of the election was 70.10%.

Candidate name:	Party name:	Votes:	% of votes:
David WHYBROW	Conservative	740	48.65
Nicky WILLSHERE	Liberal Democrat	338	22.22
Mei MINNS	UKIP	257	16.90
Patricia ASPINALL	Green	186	12.22

== See also ==
- Mid Suffolk local elections
