= John Medland Clark =

English architect

John Medland Clark (1813 – 11 April, 1849) was an English architect briefly active in Ipswich, Suffolk before his promising career was cut short by a premature death at the age of 36. Nevertheless several of the buildings he designed still make a significant contribution to Ipswich's built environment.

== Gallery ==
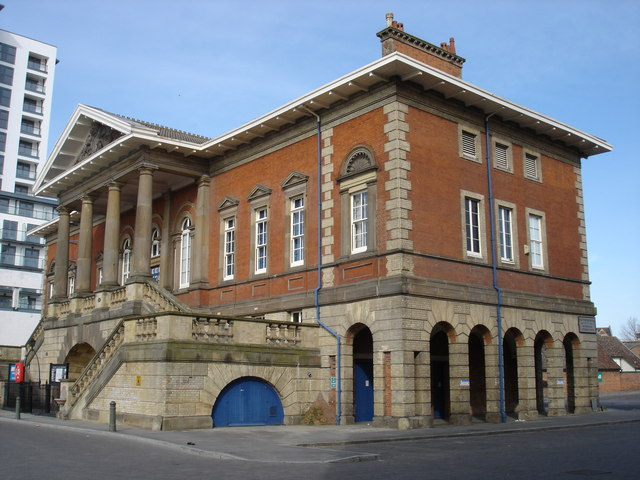
Old Custom House, Ipswich
