= Badley =

Village in Suffolk, England

Coordinates: 52.1715362°N 1.0209354°E

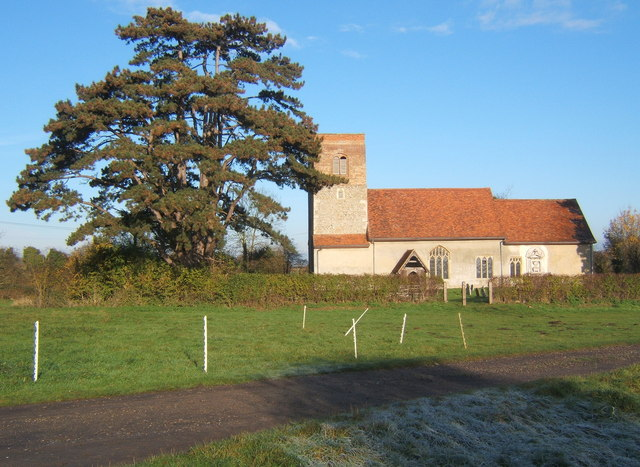
- Church of St Mary

- Location within Suffolk
- Interactive map of Badley
- Population: 79 (2001 census)
- Civil parish: Badley
- District: Mid Suffolk
- Shire county: Suffolk
- Region: East
- Country: England
- Sovereign state: United Kingdom
- Post town: Ipswich
- Postcode district: IP6
- Dialling code: 01449
- UK Parliament: Bury St Edmunds and Stowmarket

Badley is a village and civil parish in the Mid Suffolk district of Suffolk, England, located between Stowmarket and Needham Market. With an electorate of less than 100, it has an infrequent parish meeting rather than a parish council. Badley is listed as a settlement with 41 households in the 1086 Domesday Book. In 1901 the population was 77, and the parish covered 1,050 acres.

== See also ==
- St Mary's Church, Badley
