= Samuel Read =

English illustrator

Samuel Read RWS (20 December 1815, Needham Market – 6 May 1883, Sidmouth) was an English illustrator who provided many illustrations for the Illustrated London News.

Samuel was the son of Robert Read, a boot and shoemaker. He began work in Ipswich, in a law office and then for an architect. He then moved to London, where he studied wood engraving under Josiah Wood Whymper. He also learned watercolour painting, from William Collingwood Smith. He starting showing at the Royal Academy exhibitions in 1843.

It was in 1844 that Read started contributing to the Illustrated London News. He travelled widely for the magazine, abroad and for British topographical subjects.

Read married a daughter of Robert Carruthers, who owned and edited the Inverness Courier. He spent the later years of his life at Parkside, Bromley, Kent. He died of paralysis at Sidmouth, Devonshire, on 6 May 1883. Three of his drawings – The Moated Grange, The Corridor, Brewers’ Hall, Antwerp, and Toledo Cathedral— are kept in the Victoria and Albert Museum. He had been elected to the Royal Watercolour Society in 1880.
