= Needham Market =

Town in Suffolk, England

Coordinates: 52.152°N 1.053°E

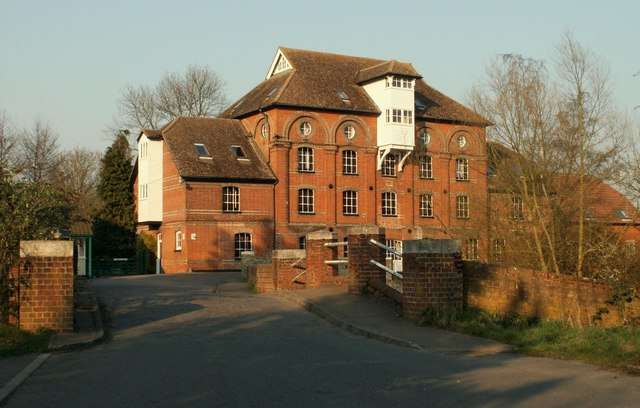
- Hawks Mill, now converted into flats

- Location within Suffolk
- Population: 4,700 (2021 Census)
- OS grid reference: TM090548
- District: Mid Suffolk
- Shire county: Suffolk
- Region: East
- Country: England
- Sovereign state: United Kingdom
- Post town: IPSWICH
- Postcode district: IP6
- Dialling code: 01449
- Police: Suffolk
- Fire: Suffolk
- Ambulance: East of England
- UK Parliament: Central Suffolk and North Ipswich

Needham Market is a historic market town in the Mid Suffolk district of Suffolk, England, set in the Gipping Valley. Nearby villages include Barking, Darmsden, Badley and Creeting St Mary. The town is located on the south and west side of the A14 trunk road, between Ipswich to the south and Stowmarket to the north; it is also sited on the Great Eastern Main Line, with the Needham Lake and the River Gipping being just east of the railway station. As of the 2021–2022 United Kingdom censuses, the town had a population of 4,700 residents. The town of Needham, Massachusetts, was named after Needham Market.

== History ==
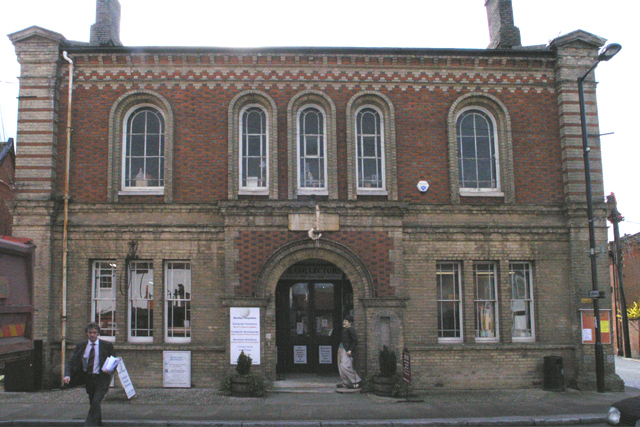
The Old Town Hall

The name Needham derives from the Old English nēdhām meaning 'village in need'.

The location was not noted in the Domesday book as it was part of the parish of Barking. A charter was granted by Henry III for market within the parish that was established at site of Needham Market. The first known recorded reference to Needham Market was made in a subsequent charter in 1245 also made by King Henry iii.

The town grew initially around the wool combing industry, until the onset of the Bubonic plague, which swept the town from 1663 to 1665. To prevent the spread of the disease, the town was chained at either end, which succeeded in its task but at the cost of two-thirds of the populace. The town did not recover for nearly two hundred years, with the canalisation of the River Gipping in the late 18th century and the introduction of the railway.

Modern Needham Market contains two road names that are linked to the plague: Chainhouse Road, named after the chains that ran across the east end of the town, and The Causeway, which is a modern variation of "the corpseway"; it is so called because of the route that plague victims were transported out of town, to neighbouring Barking church for interment.

Near the station, on land between the Rampant Horse pub and the river, is the Camping Land, with a name is derived from Campan or Campball, a rough and often rowdy medieval ball game and the predecessor of rugby football.

== Notable buildings ==
Notable buildings in the town include:

- The 15th-century Church of St. John the Baptist, originally a chapel of ease for the parish of Barking (with a unique double-hammerbeam roof).
- The medieval Limes Hotel which dates back to around 1500.
- The Old Town Hall which was designed by the English architect, Frederick Barnes and completed in 1866.

== Climate ==
Like most of the UK, Ireland and much of France, Needham Market has an oceanic climate. This means that both the winter and summer temperatures are mild with not a huge difference between the winter and summer temperatures.

Climate data for Wattisham, elevation 87m, 1971–2000, extremes 1960–
Month	Jan	Feb	Mar	Apr	May	Jun	Jul	Aug	Sep	Oct	Nov	Dec	Year
Record high °C (°F)	14.1 (57.4)	17.0 (62.6)	21.7 (71.1)	24.1 (75.4)	27.6 (81.7)	33.0 (91.4)	32.1 (89.8)	35.3 (95.5)	28.5 (83.3)	24.7 (76.5)	17.9 (64.2)	15.3 (59.5)	35.3 (95.5)
Mean daily maximum °C (°F)	6.3 (43.3)	6.6 (43.9)	9.5 (49.1)	11.9 (53.4)	15.8 (60.4)	18.7 (65.7)	21.4 (70.5)	21.6 (70.9)	18.3 (64.9)	13.9 (57.0)	9.3 (48.7)	7.1 (44.8)	13.4 (56.1)
Mean daily minimum °C (°F)	0.7 (33.3)	0.7 (33.3)	2.3 (36.1)	3.7 (38.7)	6.8 (44.2)	9.5 (49.1)	11.8 (53.2)	11.9 (53.4)	9.9 (49.8)	7.2 (45.0)	3.5 (38.3)	1.9 (35.4)	5.8 (42.4)
Record low °C (°F)	−14.6 (5.7)	−10 (14)	−8.6 (16.5)	−4.6 (23.7)	−2.3 (27.9)	−0.4 (31.3)	3.8 (38.8)	3.6 (38.5)	1.5 (34.7)	−3.5 (25.7)	−7 (19)	−13.2 (8.2)	−14.6 (5.7)
Average precipitation mm (inches)	49.5 (1.95)	35.1 (1.38)	42.5 (1.67)	41.2 (1.62)	43.7 (1.72)	52.2 (2.06)	42.4 (1.67)	47.1 (1.85)	55.1 (2.17)	57.2 (2.25)	55.6 (2.19)	52.1 (2.05)	573.8 (22.59)
Mean monthly sunshine hours	57.4	75.7	111.3	159.0	213.6	208.2	212.7	205.8	148.5	117.5	73.2	52.4	1,635.2
Source 1: Met Office
Source 2: KNMI

== Transport ==
Needham Market railway station is sited on the Great Eastern Main Line, although there are no direct services to London. Instead, there is an hourly service between Ipswich and Cambridge. It is a small unstaffed station; Greater Anglia manages it and operates the service.

The A14 (although then the A45) once ran directly through the town. A bypass was approved in 1971 as part of the extensive improvements to the A45 between Felixstowe and Birmingham. The Stowmarket to Claydon bypass was meant to be completed in two stages between 1974 and 1975 with the bypass of Needham Market intended to be complete in the 1974. However, both stages were completed in 1975. Completion of the bypass left the road now known as the B1113 running through Needham Market. This has left the town with good road links to the surrounding area, but with less traffic than before.

First Eastern Counties, a sub-brand of FirstGroup, operates the 88 route; this connects the town with Ipswich and Stowmarket every 30 minutes on weekdays.

== Sport and leisure ==
Needham Market has a non-League football club, Needham Market F.C., which plays at Bloomfields. They have been successful over recent years after reaching the semi-finals of the 2010/2011 season's FA Vase.

The town is on the route of the Dunwich Dynamo annual cycle ride, which takes place overnight. It is usually scheduled to take place on the Saturday night closest to the full moon in July.

Needham Lake provides leisure facilities and a wildlife habitat, which is located just east of the railway station. The lake is located on a nature reserve with the River Gipping running just east of it; it is popular with tourists. During the 1970s, gravel was extracted for the construction of the nearby A14; the pits were subsequently flooded to form the lake.

== Media ==
Local news and television programmes are provided by BBC East and ITV Anglia. Television signals are received from either the Tacolneston or Sudbury TV transmitters.

Local radio stations are BBC Radio Suffolk, Heart East, Nation Radio Suffolk, Greatest Hits Radio Ipswich & Suffolk and Ipswich Community Radio, a community-based station.

The town is served by the local newspapers, Ipswich Star and East Anglian Daily Times.

== Notable people ==
Notable people from Needham Market include:

- Joseph Priestley (1733–1804), chemist, theologian and natural philosopher, was Needham's parish priest from 1755–61
- Dykes Alexander (1763–1849), Quaker businessman and minister.
- Samuel Herbert Maw (1881-1952), architect, delineator and cartographer whose career took place mostly in Canada
- June Brown (1927–2022), actress who played Dot Cotton in EastEnders
- Ros Scott (born 1957), Liberal Democrat peer, a former district and county councillor for the town, chose it for her title.
