= Somersham, Suffolk =

Village in Suffolk, England

Coordinates: 52.097994°N 1.042622°E

Somersham
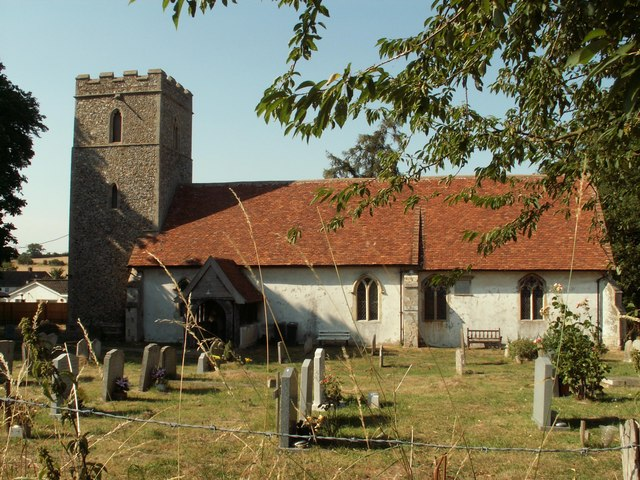
- St. Mary's Church

- Location within Suffolk
- Population: 710
- Civil parish: Somersham
- District: Mid Suffolk
- Shire county: Suffolk
- Region: East
- Country: England
- Sovereign state: United Kingdom
- Post town: IPSWICH
- Postcode district: IP8
- Police: Suffolk
- Fire: Suffolk
- Ambulance: East of England

Somersham (also known as Lower Somersham) is a village and civil parish in the Mid Suffolk district of Suffolk in eastern England, approximately 5 miles (8.0 km) northwest of Ipswich, with a population of 710 (2005).

== Amenities ==
There are two churches in the village: the St. Mary's Parish Church (OS grid TM0948), built in the early part of the 14th century and located just off Main Road in the southeast part of the village; and a Baptist Chapel in the northwest part.

There remains one operational public house, 'The Duke of Marlborough', located on Main Road. Of the earlier pubs, the 'King's Head' (OS grid TM 085 486) and the 'Griffin' (OS grid TM 090 485) were both closed in the early 20th century and converted to residential use.

The village is served by Somersham Primary School and a new village hall. The earlier Post Office and small shop closed in 2005, but a community shop opened in a purpose-built building in July 2012. Other services include a hair salon and a garage.

== Notable features ==
Somersham is situated in a relatively (for East Anglia) pronounced valley. There is a small stream flowing to the north of the village field parallel to Main Road.

Tudor Grange (OS grid TM0848) are a series of traditional timber-framed 16th-century buildings on the northwest side of the village.
