= Needham Market Ward =

Electoral ward of Mid Suffolk, England

Needham Market
- ward Mid Suffolk District Council
- Local government in East of England: Suffolk

Current ward
- Councillor: Michael Norris (Liberal Democrats)
- Councillor: Stephen Phillips (Liberal Democrats)

Needham Market Ward is a local government ward in Mid-Suffolk, Suffolk, England has elected two councillors. The next election is scheduled for May 2023.

== Councillors ==
Election	Member	Party	Member	Party
2011	Wendy Marchant	Liberal Democrats	Mike Norris	Liberal Democrats
2015	Wendy Marchant	Liberal Democrats	Mike Norris	Liberal Democrats
2019	Stephen Phillips	Liberal Democrats	Mike Norris	Liberal Democrats

== 2011 Results ==
Candidate name:	Party:	Votes:	% of votes:
Marchant, Wendy	Liberal Democrat	1045	42.29
Norris, Mike	Liberal Democrat	850	34.40
Streatfield, Samantha	UK Independence Party	299	12.10
Hill, David	Labour	277	11.21

== 2015 Results ==
The turnout of the election was 66.26%.

Candidate name:	Party Name:	Votes:	% of votes:
Wendy MARCHANT	Liberal Democrat	1307	32.51
Mike NORRIS	Liberal Democrat	921	22.91
Kay OAKES	Conservatives	913	22.71
Samantha STREATFIELD	UKIP	470	11.69
Terence CARTER	Green	409	10.17

== 2019 Results ==
The turnout of the election was 28.19%.

Candidate name:	Party Name:	Votes:	% of votes:
Michael Norris	Liberal Democrat	847	63.5
Stephen Phillips	Liberal Democrat	805	60.3
Kay Oakes	Conservatives	442	33.1
Paul Allen	Conservatives	370	27.7

== See also ==
- Mid Suffolk local elections
