= Barking, Suffolk =

Village in Suffolk, England

Coordinates: 52.137°N 1.026°E

Barking
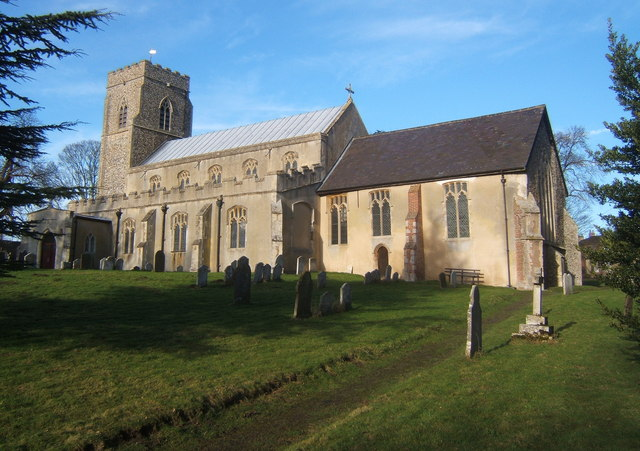
- Barking church

- Location within Suffolk
- Interactive map of Barking
- Population: 446 (2011 census)
- District: Mid Suffolk
- Shire county: Suffolk
- Region: East
- Country: England
- Sovereign state: United Kingdom
- Post town: Ipswich
- Postcode district: IP6

Barking is a village and civil parish in the Mid Suffolk district of the English county of Suffolk. It is 2 miles (3 km) west of Needham Market on the B1078 road. The village is linear along the road with its centre being around the area known as Barking Tye and away from the large village church of St Mary. There are six bells that hang the church of St Mary with the largest weighing 11 cwt – 1 qr – 7 lb. All 6 bells were recast and rehung in 1911 by Alfred Bowell.

Barking Woods is a Site of Special Scientific Interest made up of a number of wooded areas mainly to the south of the village. These are ancient woodlands documented since the 13th century and including many coppiced and pollarded oak and ash trees covering a total of 95.1 hectares (235 acres). One of the sites has active badger setts. Suffolk Wildlife Trust owns part of the largest of the wooded areas, Bonny Wood, which it operates as a nature reserve of 20 hectares (49 acres), maintaining the coppiced woodland as a series of habitats.

Barking is listed as a settlement with 63 households in the 1086 Domesday Book.
