= Barking Woods =

UK Site of Special Scientific Interest

Coordinates: 52.13°N 1.03°E

- Site of Special Scientific Interest
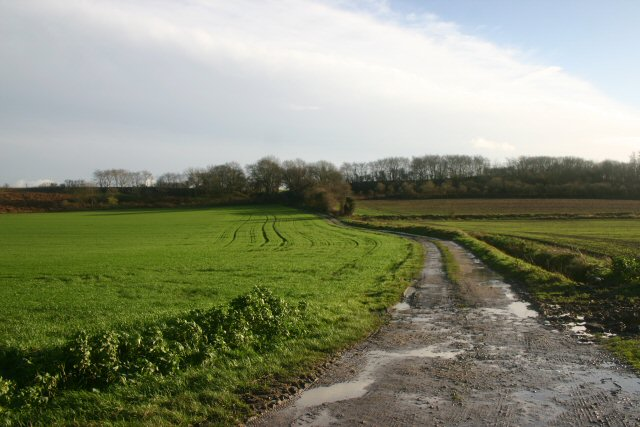
- Location of Barking Woods.
- Area of search: Suffolk
- Grid reference: TM 077 521
- Interest: Biological
- Area: 98.7 hectares
- Notification date: 1985
- Location map: Magic Map

Barking Woods is a 98.7-hectare (244-acre) biological Site of Special Scientific Interest in six separate blocks north-east of Ipswich in Suffolk. Part of it is a 20-hectare (49-acre) nature reserve called Bonny Wood, which is owned and managed by the Suffolk Wildlife Trust.

These ancient woodlands have been documented since 1251. The canopy is mainly oak, ash and silver birch, and other trees include the rare wild pear. The flora is diverse, including herb paris, ramsons, sanicle and early purple orchid.

Some areas are private land, but the nature reserve is open to the public, and a public footpath goes through Priestley Wood.
