= Ringshall, Suffolk =

Village in Suffolk, England

Coordinates: 52.135642°N 0.981387°E

Ringshall
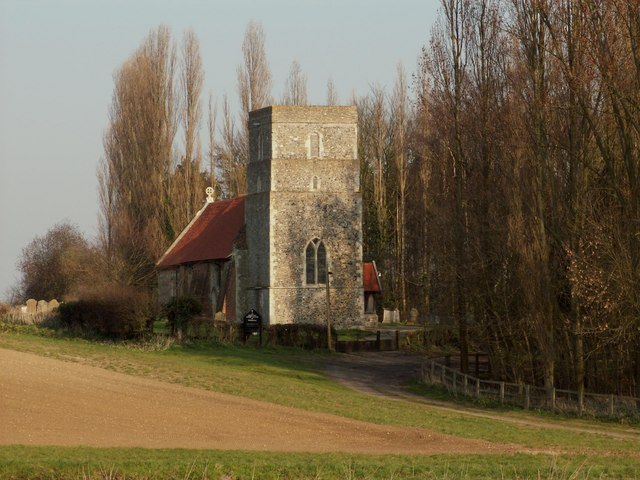
- Church of St Catherine

- Location within Suffolk
- Population: 650 (2005); 670 (2011)
- District: Mid Suffolk
- Shire county: Suffolk
- Region: East
- Country: England
- Sovereign state: United Kingdom
- Post town: Stowmarket
- Postcode district: IP14
- Dialling code: 01473
- Police: Suffolk
- Fire: Suffolk
- Ambulance: East of England

Ringshall is a village and civil parish in the Mid Suffolk district of Suffolk in eastern England. Located around four miles south of Stowmarket, and 13 miles north west of Ipswich.

Of Anglo-Saxon origin, Ringshall Grange appears in the 1086 Domesday Book. Ringshall Grange is the Grade II Listed former rectory to the church of St Catherine. The village contains a Primary School, a village hall, a grade II listed Manor, and a garage.

== History ==
In the 1870s, John Marius Wilson described Ringshall as:

"The village stands 3¼ miles W S W of Needham-Market r. station, and has a post-office under Stowmarket."

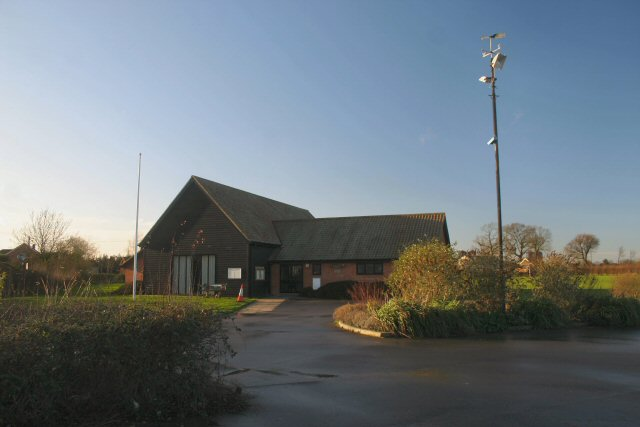
Ringshall village hall

In 1901 the population was 243, and the parish covered 2 135 acres.

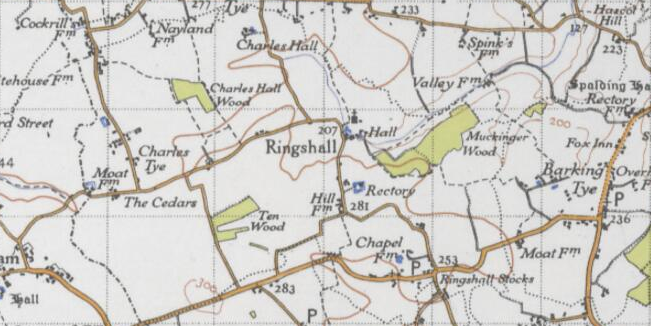
1940 Map of Ringshall, Suffolk

== Demographics ==
=== Population structure ===
According to the 2011 Census there were 334 males and 336 females living in the parish. The population dramatically increased from just over 200 people to 1400, between 1941 and 1961. But then the population in the parish declined to 600 people by 2001.

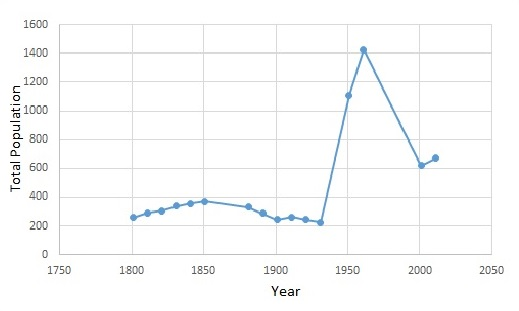
Population of Ringshall Civil Parish, Suffolk, 1801-2011.

=== Occupational structure ===
The graph of occupational structure of females in 1881, shows that 78% of females have an unknown occupation, 17% are professionals and there are a small percentage of the population in other jobs.

The graph of male occupation structure in 1881, shows that 66% of males are employed in agricultural services, 22% in domestic office or services and 5% are working with animals. This shows that Ringshall was quite primary product dependant, as a large percentage of the population worked in this sector.

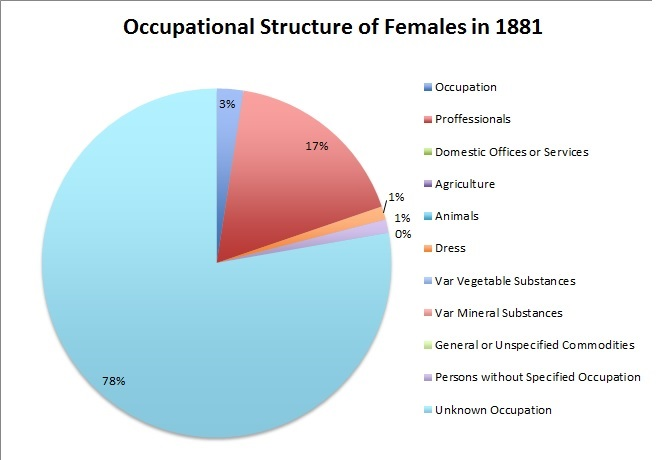
Occupational structure of Females in Ringshall in 1881

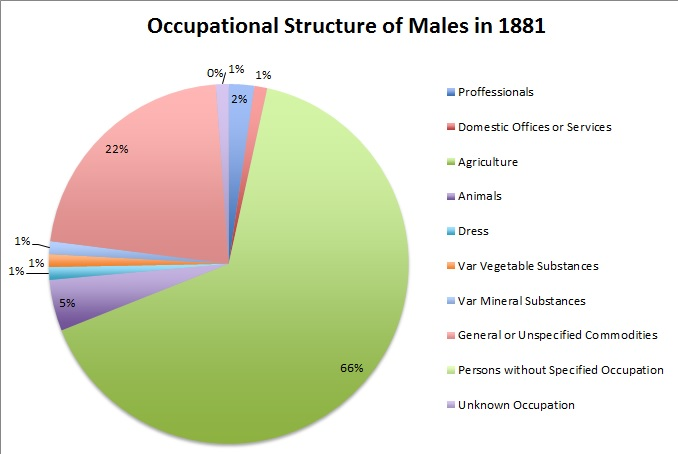
Occupational Structure of Males in Ringshall in 1881

== Transport ==
Transport facilities in the civil parish include bus services that run to Hadleigh, Bildeston, Hitcham, Great Bricett, Stowmarket and Ipswich. These transport routes run often once a day, there and back to these locations, running mostly on Monday to Saturday. The closest train service is located around 5 miles north east of Ringshall, at Needham Market.

== Services ==
=== Airfield ===
Located on the southern edge of the village lies Wattisham Airfield. It is a former RAF base which had opened in 1939 as a medium bomber station. Between 1942 and 1945 the airfield was used by the Americans as the East Anglian Air Force station during WWII.

Ringshall Grange is a Grade II listed moated house located within the civil parish, which is available to rent. Surrounding the former rectory, lies two acres of woodland and a historic belvedere mound, from which views across the valley can be seen. During 1942 to 1945, the house was used as the East Anglian headquarters of the American Air Force during the Second World War.

=== School ===
There is also a primary school located within the village of Ringshall, called Ringshall school. The state primary school caters for children aged between 5-11, who live within the catchment areas of Ringshall, Great Bricett, Barking, parts of Willisham and Wattisham Airbase.

=== Church ===
The Church of St Catherine, is the village church located within Ringshall and is a grade I listed building, which became listed on 9 December 1955. The church is located between Ringshall Hall and Coronation Glebe, on Stowmarket Road. The Church of St Catherine appears in the Domesday book of 1086, with the record showing there is a "Church with a Norman tower" located within the village.
