= Rosalind Scott, Baroness Scott of Needham Market =

British Liberal Democrat politician

The Right Honourable The Baroness Scott of Needham Market
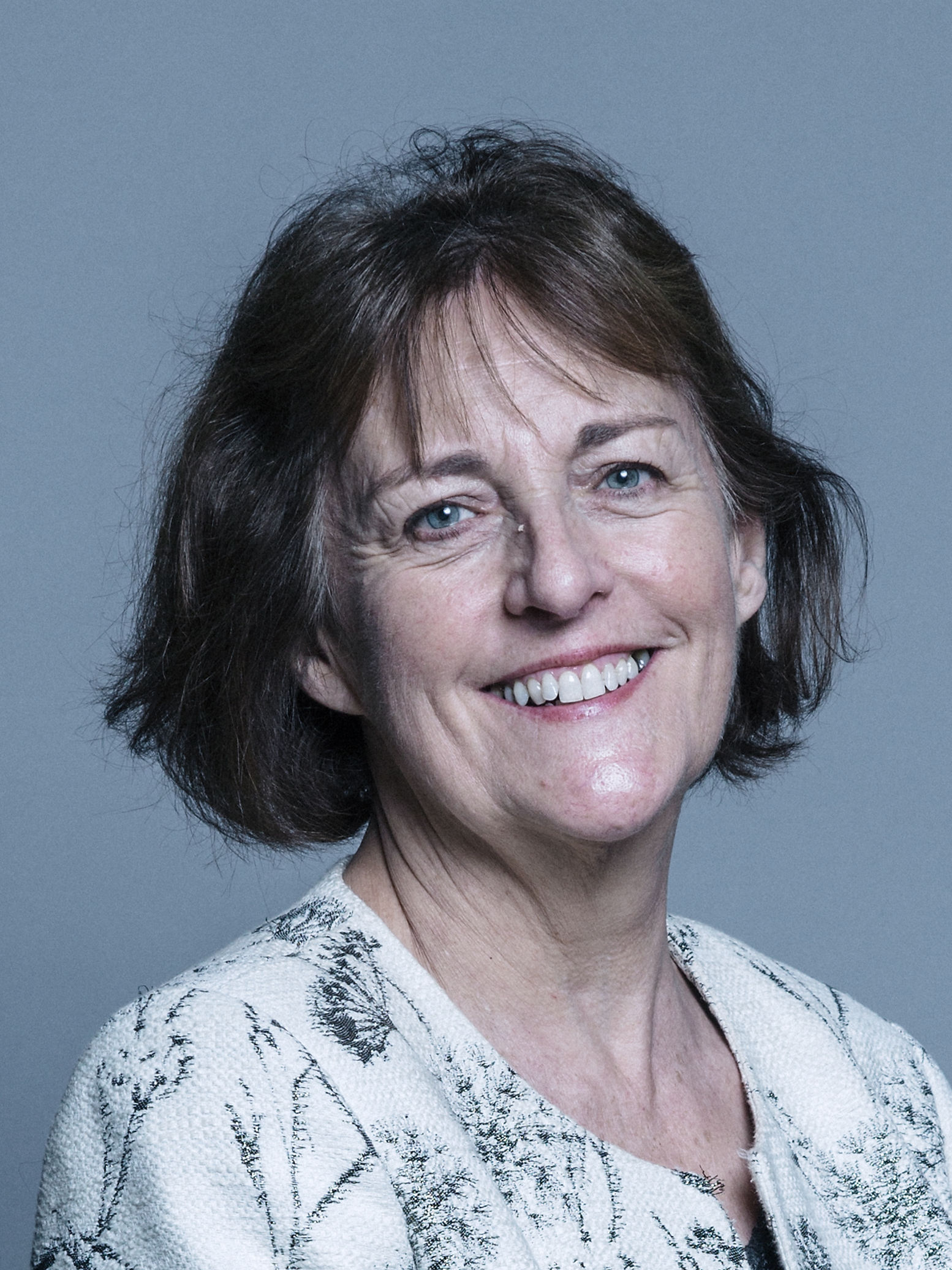
- Official portrait, 2018

President of the Liberal Democrats
- In office 1 January 2009 – 1 January 2011
- Leader: Nick Clegg
- Preceded by: Simon Hughes
- Succeeded by: Tim Farron

Member of the House of Lords
- Lord Temporal
- Life peerage 11 May 2000

Lib Dem Group Leader on Suffolk County Council
- In office May 1997 – May 2000
- Deputy: Peter Monk
- Preceded by: Peter Monk
- Succeeded by: Peter Monk

Suffolk County Councillor for Bosmere
- In office 6 May 1993 – 5 May 2005
- Preceded by: John Patton
- Succeeded by: Julia Truelove

Personal details
- Born: Rosalind Carol Leadbeater; 10 August 1957 (age 69) Bath, England
- Party: Liberal Democrats
- Spouse: Mark Valladares (m. 2008)
- Children: 2
- Education: University of East Anglia (BA)

Rosalind Carol "Ros" Scott, Baroness Scott of Needham Market (born 10 August 1957) is a British Liberal Democrat politician, non-executive director of the National Archives and a member of the House of Lords. Baroness Scott was president of the Liberal Democrats between 1 January 2009 and 31 December 2010 and was succeeded by Tim Farron.

== Early life and education ==
The daughter of Kenneth Vincent and Carol Leadbeater, she was born in Bath, Somerset. Her father, an RAF serviceman, was posted abroad through much of her childhood, including Cyprus and Singapore. She was educated at Whitby Grammar School and Kent School, Hostert, in Germany. She was further educated at the University of East Anglia, where she graduated with a Bachelor of Arts in European Studies with German in 1999.

Scott worked for the Passage Day Care Centre and is Honourable President of the East Coast Sailing Trust. She is also patron of the Pickerel Environment Project, the Pakenham Water Mill Trust and the Wings of Hope Charity Appeal.

== Political career ==
=== Local government (1991–2005) ===
She was a Liberal Democrat councillor in Suffolk from 1991 to 2005, representing Needham Market on Mid Suffolk District Council (1991–94) and Bosmere on Suffolk County Council (1993-2005). She held a number of positions on the County Council, including Group Leader in the joint administration with the Labour Party. She was appointed to the Local Government Association Transport Executive in 1997, became Chair in 2001 and is now Vice-President of the organisation. She represented UK local government in Europe as a member of the Committee of the Regions from 1997 to 2001 and as part of the North Sea Commission.

=== House of Lords (2000–present) ===
On 11 May 2000, she was created a life peer as Baroness Scott of Needham Market, of Needham Market in the County of Suffolk.

Baroness Scott has served on numerous committees in the House of Lords, including the domestic Liaison Committee and the Communication Committee. She served on the Joint Committee on the Draft House of Lords Reform Bill from July 2011 to March 2012, taking the view that the House of Lords needs major reform. She currently serves on the European Union Committee and chairs its Energy and Environment Sub-Committee.

=== Liberal Democrats ===
In 2008, she stood down as the Liberal Democrat Spokesperson for Communities and Local Government to concentrate on being a candidate to be President of the Liberal Democrats. On 8 November 2008, it was announced that she had won the ballot of party members to become President of the Liberal Democrats, beating Lembit Öpik by a margin of 72% to 22%. She took office as President on 1 January 2009. She later stood down as president and was succeeded by Tim Farron in 2011.

=== Alliance of Liberals and Democrats for Europe (2015–2017) ===
At the 36th Annual Congress of the Alliance of Liberals and Democrats for Europe (ALDE), held in Budapest, Hungary from 19 to 21 November 2015, she was elected to be one of ALDE's seven Vice-Presidents for a two-year term.

== Professional life ==
She has been a non-executive director at Lloyd's Register, Entrust, the Landfill Tax regulator and ITV, and was also a member of the Commission for Integrated Transport think-tank. She is currently a non-executive director of the Harwich Haven Authority, and is the Liberal Democrat-nominated member of the House of Lords Appointments Commission.

== Personal life ==
Scott was married, but was divorced later. She has a daughter, Sally, and a son, Jamie. On 22 April 2008 she married fellow Liberal Democrat, Mark Valladares.

Party political offices
Preceded by Simon Hughes	President of the Liberal Democrats; 2009 – 2010	Succeeded by Tim Farron
