= Thedwastre South Division, Suffolk =

Electoral division in Suffolk

Thedwastre South
- County Council constituency for the Suffolk County Council
- District: Mid Suffolk
- Region: East of England
- Population: 9,253 (2019)
- Electorate: 7,260 (2021)

Current constituency
- Created: 1985
- Seats: 1
- Councillor: Matt Bentley (Green Party)
- Local council: Mid Suffolk District Council
- Created from: Thedwastre No. 1, Thedwastre No. 2

Thedwastre South Division is an electoral division in Mid Suffolk District, Suffolk which returns a single County Councillor to Suffolk County Council.

== Geography ==
Thedwastre South is a largely rural division covering the South and East of the former Thedwastre Hundred area of Mid Suffolk, from the West of Stowmarket to Thurston. It's has higher-than-average proportion of people over the age of 45.

== History ==
It's been held by current Lib Dem leader Penny Otton since a 2007 by election following the resignation of former opposition leader Sue Sida-Lockett, who had transferred from Thedwastre North following the 2005 boundary changes.

== Boundaries and boundary changes ==
=== 1985–2005 ===
- Mid Suffolk District Wards of Elmswell, Onehouse, Rattlesden and Woolpit.

=== 2005–present ===
- Mid Suffolk District Wards of Onehouse, Rattlesden and Thurston & Hessett.

== Members for Thedwastre South ==
Member	Party	Term	Notes
George Foss	Conservative	1985–1989	
Ronald Aitken	Conservative	1989–1993	
Clive Ward	Liberal Democrats	1993–1997	
Thomas Iredale	Conservative	1997–2001	
Christopher Storey	Conservative	2001	Died 2001
Jane Storey	Conservative	2002–2005	Contested Thedwastre North following redistribution
Sue Sida-Lockett	Conservative	2005–2007	Member for Thedwastre North (1985–2005); Deputy Council Leader (2005–2007)
Penny Otton	Liberal Democrats	2007–present	Leader of Mid Suffolk District Council (–2003); Lib Dem Group Leader (2019–)

== Election results ==
=== Elections in the 2020s ===
2021 Suffolk County Council election:Thedwastre South
Party	Candidate	Votes	%	±%
Liberal Democrats	Penny Otton *	1,435	46.0	▼0.7
Conservative	John Augustine	1,321	42.3	▼1.5
Labour	Philip Cockell	364	11.7	▲2.2
Majority		114	3.7	▲0.8
Rejected ballots		26	0.8	▲0.7
Turnout		3,148	43.4	▲3.3
Registered electors		7,260		
Liberal Democrats hold		Swing	+0.4	
