= St John's Division, Suffolk =

Electoral division of Suffolk, England

St John's
- County Council constituency for the Suffolk County Council
- District: Ipswich
- Region: East of England
- Population: 9,683 (2019)
- Electorate: 7,104 (2021)
- Major settlements: California

Current constituency
- Created: 1973
- Seats: 1
- Councillor: Adele Cook (Labour)
- Local council: Ipswich Borough Council

St John's Division is an electoral division of Suffolk which returns one county councillor to Suffolk County Council. It is located in the North East Area of Ipswich and consists of most of St John's Ward and part of Alexandra Ward of Ipswich Borough Council.

== Members for St John's ==
Member	Party	Term
J Mowles	Labour	1973–1977
M Hammond	Conservative	1977–1981
M Sierakowski	Labour	1981–1985
Andy MacKnelly	Labour	1985–1989
Michael Hyde	Labour	1989–1997
Sandy Martin	Labour	1997–2017
Sarah Adams	Labour	2017–2025
Adele Cook	Labour	2025–

== Election results ==
=== Elections in the 2020s ===
St John's By-Election 24 April 2025
Party	Candidate	Votes	%	±%
Labour	Adele Cook	600	28%	−19.7
Green	Adria Pittock	458	21.4	+13.6
Reform UK	Michelle Bevan-Margetts	442	20.65	+20.65
Conservative	James Harding	318	14.85	−24.35
Liberal Democrats	Kelly Turner	323	15.1	+10.8%
Majority		142	6.6%	−1.9%
Turnout		2141		

2021 Suffolk County Council election: St John's
Party	Candidate	Votes	%	±%
Labour	Sarah Adams	1,335	47.7	–9.9
Conservative	Ollie Rackham	1,098	39.2	+7.5
Green	Jude Rook	219	7.8	+2.1
Liberal Democrats	Robin Whitmore	148	5.3	+0.3
Majority		237	8.5	
Turnout		2,819	39.7	
Registered electors		7,104		
Labour hold		Swing		

=== Elections in the 2010s ===
St John's By-Election 7 September 2017
Party	Candidate	Votes	%	±%
Labour	Sarah Adams	1,247	62.9	+5.3
Conservative	James Harding	483	24.4	−7.3
Liberal Democrats	Edward Packard	200	10.1	+5.1
Green	Charlotte Armstrong	52	2.6	−3.1
Majority		764	38.5	+12.6
Turnout		1,987	29.7	−6.2
Labour hold		Swing	+6.3	

Preceded by Belstead Brook	Division held by the Opposition leader of SCC; 2013–2017	Succeeded by Rushmere
Preceded by Rushmere	Division held by the Opposition leader of SCC; 2017–2021	Succeeded by Upper Gipping
