= Hoxne & Eye Division, Suffolk =

Electoral division of Suffolk, England

Hoxne & Eye
- County Council constituency for the Suffolk County Council
- District: Mid Suffolk
- Region: East of England
- Population: 9,596 (2019)
- Electorate: 7,992 (2024)
- Major settlements: Eye

Current constituency
- Created: 2005
- Seats: 1
- Councillor: Henry Lloyd (Conservative)
- Local council: Mid Suffolk District Council
- Created from: Hartismere and Hoxne

Hoxne & Eye Division is an electoral division of Suffolk which returns one county councillor to Suffolk County Council.

== Geography ==
The Division is located in the Mid-Suffolk district sits on the High Suffolk Plain and borders the river Waveney to the north made up of rural landscape and several villages and civil parishes.

== Boundaries and boundary changes ==
=== 2005–present ===
- Mid Suffolk District Wards of Eye, Fressingfield, Hoxne, and Stradbroke.

== Members for Hoxne & Eye ==
Member	Party	Term
Guy McGregor	Conservative	2005–2021
Guy McGregor	Independent	2021
Peter Gould	Conservative	2021–2024
Henry Lloyd	Conservative	2024–present

== Election results ==
=== Elections in the 2020s ===
Hoxne and Eye By-Election: 10 October 2024
Party	Candidate	Votes	%	±%
Conservative	Henry Lloyd	895	45.3	+0.3
Green	Joanne Brooks	891	45.1	N/A
Liberal Democrats	Timothy Glenton	102	5.2	−14.0
Labour	Paul Theaker	89	4.5	−6.6
Majority		4	0.2	
Turnout		1,977	24.7	–17.9
Rejected ballots		9		
Total ballots		1,986		
Registered electors		7,992		+350
Conservative hold		Swing	–22.4	

2021 Suffolk County Council election: Hoxne & Eye
Party	Candidate	Votes	%	±%
Conservative	Peter Gould	1,467	45.0	–11.8
Independent	Guy McGregor *	806	24.7	N/A
Liberal Democrats	Timothy Glenton	623	19.1	+4.6
Labour	Paul Anderson	363	11.1	–3.2
Majority		661	20.3	–22.1
Turnout		3,279	42.9	+0.7
Registered electors		7,642		
Conservative hold		Swing	–18.3	
