= Jo Churchill =

British politician (born 1964)

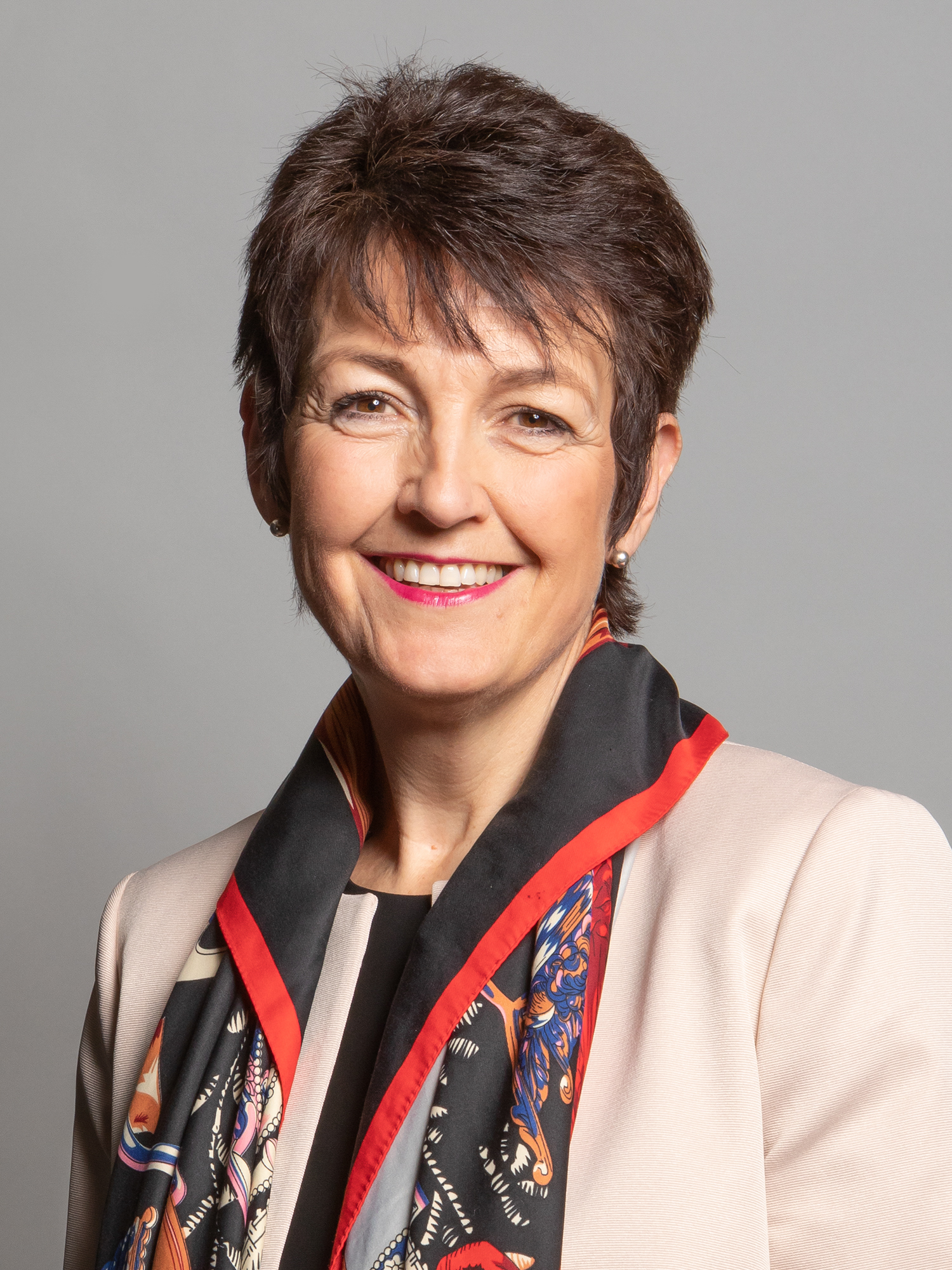
- Official portrait, 2020

Minister of State for Employment
- In office 13 November 2023 – 5 July 2024
- Prime Minister: Rishi Sunak
- Preceded by: Guy Opperman
- Succeeded by: Alison McGovern

Vice-Chamberlain of the Household
- In office 8 September 2022 – 13 November 2023
- Prime Minister: Liz Truss; Rishi Sunak
- Preceded by: Michael Tomlinson
- Succeeded by: Stuart Anderson

Parliamentary Under-Secretary of State for Agri-Innovation and Climate Adaptation
- In office 16 September 2021 – 6 July 2022
- Prime Minister: Boris Johnson
- Preceded by: Victoria Prentis

Parliamentary Under-Secretary of State for Prevention, Public Health and Primary Care
- In office 26 July 2019 – 16 September 2021
- Prime Minister: Boris Johnson
- Preceded by: Seema Kennedy
- Succeeded by: Maria Caulfield

Member of Parliament for Bury St Edmunds
- In office 7 May 2015 – 30 May 2024
- Preceded by: David Ruffley
- Succeeded by: Constituency abolished

Personal details
- Born: 18 March 1964 (age 62)
- Party: Conservative
- Website: Official website

Johanna Peta Churchill (born 18 March 1964) is a British politician who served as the Member of Parliament (MP) for Bury St Edmunds from 2015 to 2024. A member of the Conservative Party, she served as Minister of State in the Department for Work and Pensions from November 2023 until July 2024. She previously served as Vice-Chamberlain of the Household from 2022 to 2023. In that role, she took part in the 2023 Coronation and the 2023 State Opening of Parliament.

== Early life ==
Johanna Churchill was privately educated at Dame Alice Harpur School.

== Career ==
Churchill was the finance director of a scaffolding company and served on Lincolnshire County Council.

Churchill was the member of parliament (MP) for the constituency of Bury St Edmunds in Suffolk, which encompasses Bury St Edmunds and Stowmarket, having first taken her seat at the 2015 general election. She has sat on the Women and Equalities Committee and the Environmental Audit Select Committee.

Churchill was opposed to Brexit prior to the 2016 referendum. She has since stated that the EU referendum result must be respected and therefore supported Theresa May in triggering Article 50 (the formal process of leaving the EU).

She entered government when she was made an assistant government whip during the reshuffle on 9 January 2018, having previously served as PPS to Jeremy Hunt, Secretary of State for the Department of Health.

In July 2019, Churchill was appointed Parliamentary Under-Secretary of State for Prevention, Public Health and Primary Care at the Department for Health and Social Care in the first Johnson ministry.

In September 2021, Churchill was appointed Parliamentary Under-Secretary of State for Agri-Innovation and Climate Adaptation at the Department for Environment, Food and Rural Affairs during the second cabinet reshuffle of the second Johnson ministry. She resigned from this position in 2022 in protest at Boris Johnson's conduct in the Chris Pincher scandal.

In 2023, Churchill as Vice-Chamberlain of the Household, was "taken hostage" at Buckingham Palace to ensure the King's safe return after the 2023 State Opening of Parliament.

She announced that she would not stand for re-election at the 2024 United Kingdom general election. She was replaced as the Conservative candidate for the new constituency of Bury St Edmunds and Stowmarket by special adviser Will Tanner, who ultimately lost the contest to Labour candidate Peter Prinsley.

Parliament of the United Kingdom
Preceded by David Ruffley	Member of Parliament for Bury St Edmunds; 2015–2024	Constituency abolished
