= Thedwastre North Division, Suffolk =

Electoral division in Suffolk

Thedwastre North
- County Council constituency for the Suffolk County Council
- District: Mid Suffolk
- Region: East of England
- Population: 10,655 (2019)
- Electorate: 8,497 (2021)
- Major settlements: Elmswell, Woolpit

Current constituency
- Created: 1985
- Seats: 1
- Councillor: Andy Mellen (Green)
- Local council: Mid Suffolk District Council
- Created from: Thedwastre No. 1, Thedwastre No. 2

Thedwastre North Division is an electoral division in Mid Suffolk District, Suffolk which returns a single County Councillor to Suffolk County Council.

== Geography ==
Thedwastre North is a largely rural division covering the North and West of the former Thedwastre Hundred area of Mid Suffolk. It has a higher-than-average proportion of people over the age of 45.

== History ==
Having been held by the Conservatives for most of its existence (including by group leader Sue Sida-Lockett), it was won by the Greens in 2021 after the sitting member Jane Storey, who was deselected by the party in October 2020, ran as an Independent.

== Boundaries and boundary changes ==
=== 1985–2005 ===
- Mid Suffolk District Wards of Badwell Ash, Norton, Thurston and Walsham-le-Willows.

=== 2005–present ===
- Mid Suffolk District Wards of Badwell Ash, Elmswell & Norton and Woolpit.

== Members for Thedwastre North ==
Member	Party	Term
Sue Sida-Lockett	Conservative	1985–2005
Jane Storey	Conservative	2005–2020
Jane Storey	Independent	2020–2021
Andy Mellen	Green	2021–present

== Election results ==
=== Elections in the 2020s ===
2021 Suffolk County Council election:Thedwastre North
Party	Candidate	Votes	%	±%
Green	Andy Mellen	1,472	40.6	▲19.0
Conservative	Harry Richardson	1,226	34.0	▼28.2
Independent	Jane Storey *	706	19.6	N/A
Labour	Ursula Ajimal	199	5.5	▼3.9
Majority		246	6.8	
Rejected ballots		20	0.5	▲0.4
Turnout		3,623	42.7	▲5.3
Registered electors		8,497		
Green gain from Conservative		Swing	+23.6	

Preceded by	Division held by the Opposition leader of SCC –2002	Succeeded by Cosford
