= Bury St Edmunds and Stowmarket =

UK Parliament constituency (since 2024)

- County constituency for the House of Commons
- Interactive map of boundaries since 2024
- Location within the East of England
- County: Suffolk
- Electorate: 75,655 (March 2020)
- Major settlements: Bury St Edmunds, Stowmarket, Thurston, Elmswell

Current constituency
- Created: 2024
- Member of Parliament: Peter Prinsley (Labour)
- Seats: One
- Created from: Bury St Edmunds & West Suffolk (part)

Bury St Edmunds and Stowmarket is a constituency of the House of Commons in the UK Parliament represented since its creation for the 2024 general election by Peter Prinsley of the Labour Party. The constituency is named for the Suffolk towns of Bury St Edmunds and Stowmarket.

== Constituency profile ==
The Bury St Edmunds and Stowmarket constituency is located in Suffolk. Its largest settlement is the town of Bury St Edmunds, with a population of around 41,000. Other settlements include the smaller town of Stowmarket and the villages of Elmswell and Stanton. The constituency is predominantly rural and agricultural. Bury St Edmunds is a historic market town. It has a long religious history as the site of an abbey and a cathedral, and a tradition of brewing as the base of pub and brewing company Greene King.

The constituency is generally affluent. Residents are older and have higher incomes compared to national averages, and White people make up 95% of the population. At the district council level, most of Bury St Edmunds is represented by Labour Party councillors, whilst the rural areas elected mostly Conservatives in the west and Greens in the south east. Voters in the constituency marginally supported leaving the European Union in the 2016 referendum; an estimated 53% voted in favour of Brexit, similar to the nationwide figure.

== Boundaries ==
The constituency is composed of the following:

- The District of Mid Suffolk wards of: Chilton; Combs Ford; Elmswell & Woolpit; Onehouse; Rattlesden; St. Peter’s; Stow Thorney; Thurston.
- The District of West Suffolk wards of: Abbeygate; Bardwell; Barningham; Eastgate; Ixworth; Minden; Moreton Hall; Pakenham & Troston; Rougham; St. Olaves; Southgate; Stanton; The Fornhams & Great Barton; Tollgate; Westgate.

Bury St Edmunds and Stowmarket contains the majority of the abolished Bury St Edmunds constituency and a small area to the north transferred from the West Suffolk constituency.

The constituency covers Bury St Edmunds, Stowmarket and smaller settlements on the A14 corridor.

== History ==
The newly created constituency was notionally a safe Conservative seat, with an estimated majority of 22,085 votes (41.7%) based on the results of the 2019 election. The predecessor seat of Bury St Edmunds had not elected a non-Conservative MP since it elected one Liberal at the 1880 election, and none at all since becoming a single-member constituency in 1885.

However, at the 2024 election the Tories suffered an above-average swing against them of 21.6% and won less than half their vote share from 2019, turning their notional majority of over 22,000 into a Labour majority of 1,452. Along with the party gaining Suffolk Coastal, this was the first time since it won Sudbury in 1945 that Labour had won any Suffolk constituencies not centred on Ipswich or Lowestoft.

== Members of Parliament ==
Bury St Edmunds and West Suffolk prior to 2024

Election	Member	Party
2024	Peter Prinsley	Labour

== Election results ==
=== Elections in the 2020s ===
General election 2024: Bury St Edmunds and Stowmarket
Party	Candidate	Votes	%	±%
Labour	Peter Prinsley	16,745	32.9	+12.1
Conservative	Will Tanner	15,293	30.1	−32.9
Reform	Scott Hussey	8,595	16.9	N/A
Green	Emma Buckmaster	5,761	11.3	−1.1
Liberal Democrats	Peter McDonald	3,154	6.2	+5.1
Independent	Jeremy Lee	819	1.6	N/A
Rejoin EU	Richard Baker-Howard	350	0.7	N/A
Communist	Darren Turner	176	0.4	N/A
Majority		1,452	2.85	N/A
Turnout		50,893	65.6	−3.8
Registered electors		77,599		
Labour gain from Conservative		Swing	+22.5	

=== Elections in the 2010s ===
2019 notional result
Party	Vote	%
Conservative	33,023	62.9
Labour	10,938	20.8
Green	6,520	12.4
Others	1,435	2.7
Liberal Democrats	565	1.1
Turnout	52,481	69.4
Electorate	75,655	

== See also ==
- List of parliamentary constituencies in Suffolk
