= Stradbroke =

Village in Mid-Suffolk, England

Coordinates: 52.318°N 1.274°E

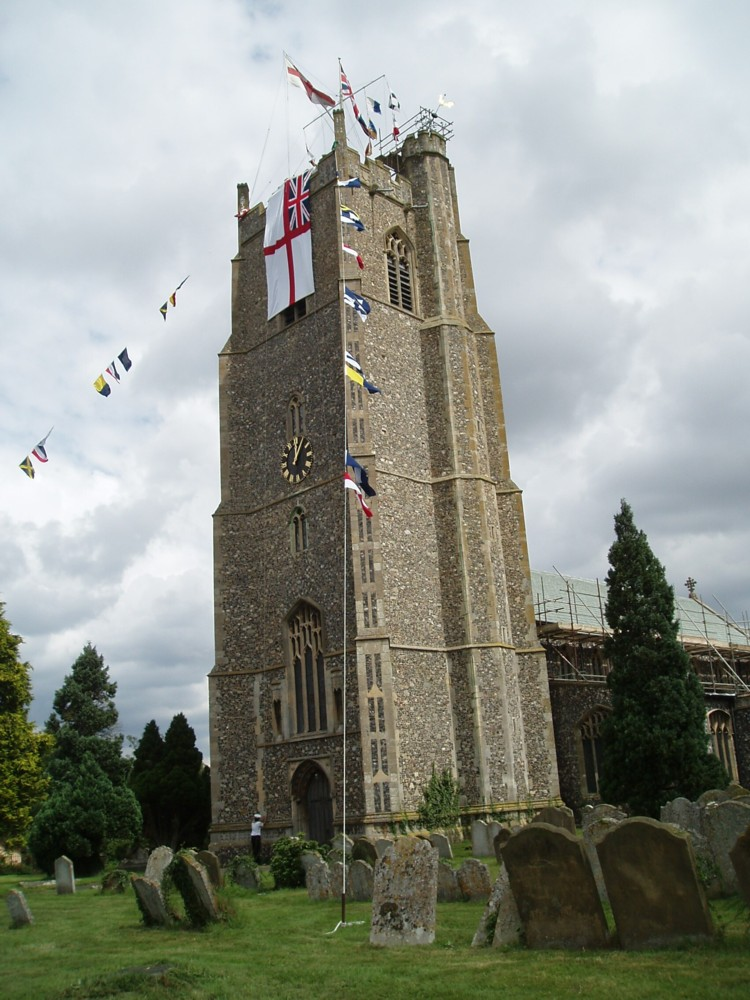
- Church of All Saints, Stradbroke

- Location within Suffolk
- Area: 15.35 km^{2} (5.93 sq mi)
- Population: 1,408 (2011)
  - Density: 92/km^{2} (240/sq mi)
- OS grid reference: TM231739
- District: Mid Suffolk
- Shire county: Suffolk
- Region: East
- Country: England
- Sovereign state: United Kingdom
- Post town: Eye
- Postcode district: IP21
- Dialling code: 01379
- Police: Suffolk
- Fire: Suffolk
- Ambulance: East of England
- UK Parliament: Central Suffolk and North Ipswich

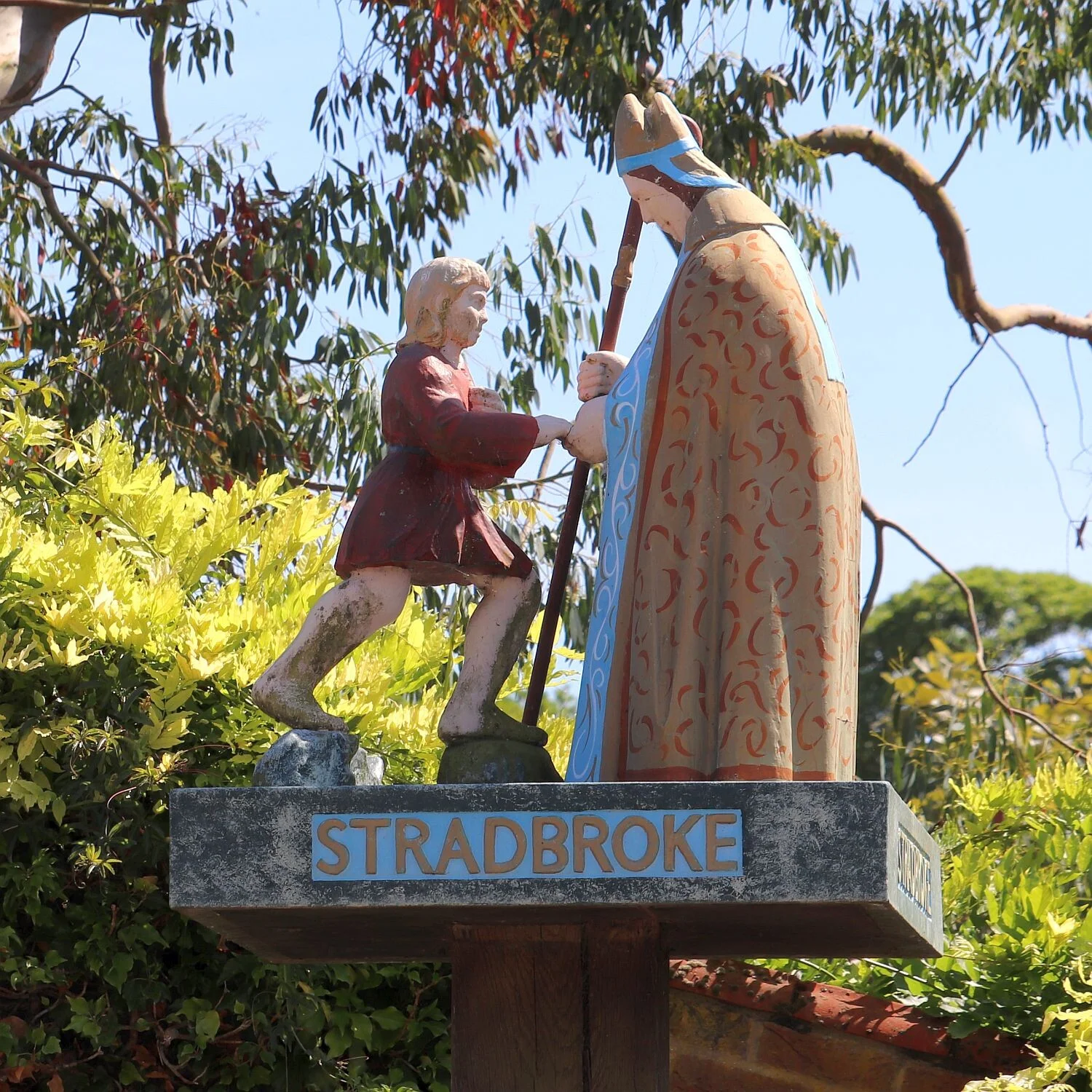
Stradbroke Village Sign

Stradbroke (/ˈstrædbrʊk/ STRAD-brook) is an English village in the Mid Suffolk district of the county of Suffolk. The census of 2011 gave the parish a population of 1,408, with an estimate of 1,513 in 2018.

== Heritage ==
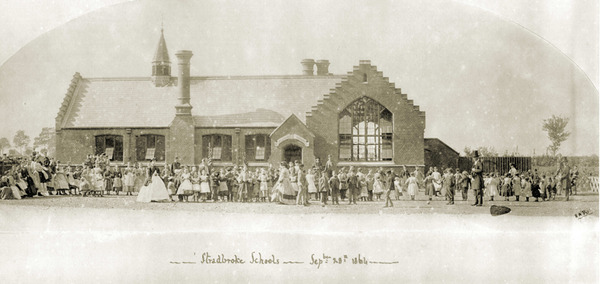
The opening of Stradbroke Primary School on 28 October 1864.

The village was listed in the Domesday Book of 1096 as being in the Bishop's Hundred, later renamed Hoxne Hundred. The village name was sometimes spelt Stradbrook in the Middle Ages and in local documents as late as the early 19th century.

A post-medieval source states that the prominent medieval philosopher Robert Grosseteste, also Bishop of Lincoln, was born in Stradbroke in about 1175, but there is no medieval evidence to confirm this. Its parish church of All Saints, with a 15th-century tower and a raised stair turret, dominates the village as a landmark. Most of the church is in the perpendicular style, including the tower and nave, with 15th-century flint flushwork on the battlements, highlighting the village's wealth at the time.

In October 2014 the state primary school marked the 150th anniversary of its predecessor's opening on 28 September 1864.

The village used to host a Navy Day on the last Saturday in July, to mourn the end of the Royal Navy's rum ration in July 1970; as part of the celebration a tot of rum was processed round the village. The last such event was held in 2007.

== Amenities ==
Stradbroke's position as a centre for smaller villages and hamlets means it has more facilities than its population might suggest. It serves as an education centre for Mid Suffolk, with a primary school and a high school in the village.

There are two pubs, several shops, and local services that include a public library, a community centre, a swimming pool and a gym. It has a playing field for cricket and football, three tennis courts, two bowling greens and a fitness track. The village includes some 12 mi (19.31 km) of public footpaths, maintained by local government two or three times a year. Near the community centre there is a doctor's surgery and a play area for young children. At Westhall there is another play area and a recreation ground for informal games.

Village services and the built environment are governed by the civil Stradbroke Parish Council, with 13 seats where councillors are elected every four years, which forms the first tier of local government for the area. The last elections were held in 2019, the 2023 election ran uncontested as there were not 13 persons nominated. The village is also part of the electoral division for Hoxne & Eye electing to Suffolk County Council, and the Stradbroke & Laxfield ward for Mid Suffolk District Council.

The village post office reopened in 2014 in the local library, housed in the historic courthouse building. The previous post office in a shop had closed. Library staff work on both the post office and library counters. The village shop was refurbished in 2014. There is also a bakery, a butcher's shop, a wedding shop, and an antiques centre and cafe.

In 2012 a field of 6 acres (24,000 m^{2}) was bought on Drapers Hill and 28 allotment gardens laid out, along with a community orchard and wild flower meadow. A pond was donated at the top of the site, overlooked by donated public seats. There are views of the church towards the centre of the village.

Stradbroke has a free magazine, the Stradbroke Monthly, and an online community radio station, Radio Stradbroke. The Stradisphere Festival was an annual music event held between 2013 and 2018 in the village featuring acts including Badly Drawn Boy.

== Transport ==
Stradbroke lies midway between Norwich and Ipswich on the B1117 and B1118 secondary roads, some 7 miles (11 km) from the Suffolk town of Eye and 9 miles (14.5 km) from the Norfolk market town of Diss, where the village's nearest railway station is located. Train services from Diss take an hour and a half to reach London. There used to be a railway service linking Stradbroke with Haugley Junction to the West and Laxfield to the East, with Stradbroke railway station active between 1908 and 1952 on the Mid-Suffolk Light Railway, until the whole line closed. There is a limited public school bus service linking Stradbroke to Eye, Framlingham and Ipswich.

== Notable people ==
In birth order:

- Robert Grosseteste (c. 1175–1253), scholar and Bishop of Lincoln, is said to have been born in Stradbroke.
- Mary Matilda Betham (1776–1852), diarist, poet and miniature painter, was born in Stradbroke.
- William Betham (1779–1853), antiquarian, brother of Mary Matilda, was born in Stradbroke.
- J. C. Ryle (1816–1900), became Vicar of Stradbroke in 1861 and set in motion a restoration of the church in the 1870s. He later became Bishop of Liverpool.
- Herbert Edward Ryle (1856–1925), son of J. C. Ryle, was brought up in Stradbroke. He later served successively as Bishop of Exeter, Bishop of Winchester and Dean of Westminster.
