= Tax Statements =

Tax statements are statements that are sent annually to each UK taxpayer detailing the payments of Income Tax and National Insurance. It was due for introduction in 2014.

In 2012 Ben Gummer proposed annual tax statements intended to show itemised spending per department in proportion to the amount the taxpayer paid in the year to date. The Labour MP Chris Bryant whilst welcoming it in principle opposed it on the grounds that the figures were estimates not actual figures. Gummer's proposal was favourably received by the press in the UK and in the US by The Wall Street Journal. It was included in the 2012 budget and due for introduction in 2014, with George Osborne calling it "an excellent idea". The TaxPayers' Alliance subsequently honoured Gummer as their 'Pin-Up of the Month'. It also got the support of the prime minister.

== Example ==
A breakdown showed that for someone with a salary of £25,500 in 2012 and paying £5,979 tax:

- £2,080 went on pensions and benefits
- £1,094 on the NHS;
- £824 on education
- £339 on defence
- £160 on the police
- £44 on prisons
- £92 on roads
- £71 on railways
- £28 to the European Union
