= Thurston and Hessett Ward =

Electoral ward of Mid Suffolk, England

The candidate information for the Thurston and Hessett Ward in Mid-Suffolk, Suffolk, England. This ward elects two councillors.

== Councillors ==
Election	Member	Party	Member	Party
2011	Derrick Haley	Conservative	Sam Powell	Conservative
2015	Derrick Haley	Conservative	Esther Jewson	Conservative

== 2011 Results ==
Candidate name:	Party:	Votes:	% of votes:
Haley, Derrick	Conservative	999	38.17
Powell, Sam	Conservative	724	27.67
Kemplay, David	Liberal Democrat	499	19.07
Bush, Gillian	UK Independence Party	226	8.64
Palmer, Geoffrey	UK Independence Party	169	6.46

== 2015 Results ==
The turnout of the election was 73.87%.

Candidate name:	Party name:	Votes:	% of votes:
Derrick HALEY	Conservative	1459	35.74
Esther JEWSON	Conservative	918	22.49
Ellen KIRKBY	Liberal Democrat	606	14.85
Jonathan ARNOLD	Green	576	14.11
Ryan FISKE	UKIP	523	12.81

== See also ==
- Mid Suffolk local elections
