= Hessett =

Village in Suffolk, England

Coordinates: 52.21752°N 0.83399°E

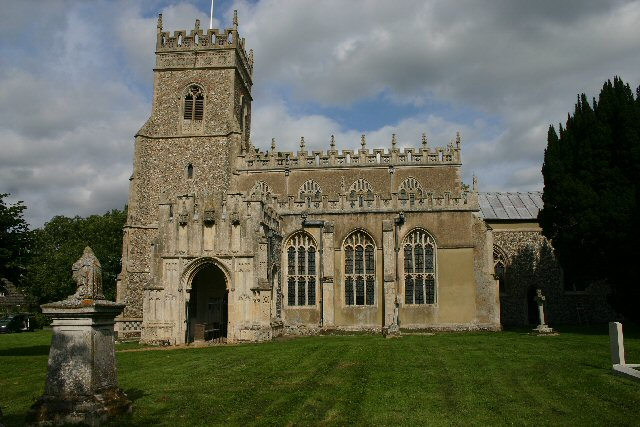
- Church of St Ethelbert

- Location within Suffolk
- Population: 490
- District: Mid Suffolk
- Shire county: Suffolk
- Region: East
- Country: England
- Sovereign state: United Kingdom
- Post town: Bury St Edmunds
- Postcode district: IP30
- Police: Suffolk
- Fire: Suffolk
- Ambulance: East of England
- UK Parliament: Bury St Edmunds and Stowmarket

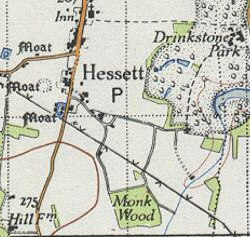
1945 map of Hessett

Hessett is a village and civil parish in the Mid Suffolk district of Suffolk in eastern England. Hessett is located around four miles south-east of Bury St Edmunds. It is a rural village with a single north-south road off which most other roads flow. In 2011 its population was 464 which is towards the highest recorded population since its peak in 1850. Hessett is south of Beyton and west of Drinkstone.

== History ==
A small village has been present in this area for over 1000 years with the earliest mention in AD 1005 when Ulfketel gave the village (alongside others) to Abbey Bury, St. Edmund's." According to the 2011 Census there were 216 males and 248 females living in Hessett at this time.

The village's name is derived from the Old English for Hedge Fold with hecg meaning hedge and set meaning a dwelling, a camp, a place for animals, a stable, or a fold. The name referring to the agricultural nature and landscape of the village.

=== Historical writing ===
In 1870–72, John Marius Wilson's Imperial Gazetteer of England and Wales described the village as:

HESSETT, a parish in Stow district, Suffolk; 2½ miles S of Thurston r. station. The church was built by the Bacons; is in good condition; has a beautiful window and a tower; and contains tombs of the Bacons.

== Church ==
The Church in Hessett is of significance and is featured in Simon Jenkins’ book of England’s 1,000 Best Churches. The dedication is to Æthelberht II of East Anglia (St. Ethelbert), and the building is a described as a typical Suffolk perpendicular church of the 15th century. The chancel is separated from the nave by a 15th-century rood screen, which is elegantly painted and gilded on the west (nave) side.

== Industry ==
Occupations for male and females in 1881 for Hessett.

The census in 1831 gave a more detailed information about people's occupations in comparison to the 1801 census, for Hessett, the majority of the male population aged 20 and over were involved in some sort of agricultural occupation as "the land is chiefly arable", for example; " Farmers employing labourers and agricultural labourers." The remaining of males in Hessett held occupations of "Retail and Handicrafts and 2 Farmers not employing Labourers"., with others being either gentry or their servants "63" people being grouped in this occupation.

== Demographics ==
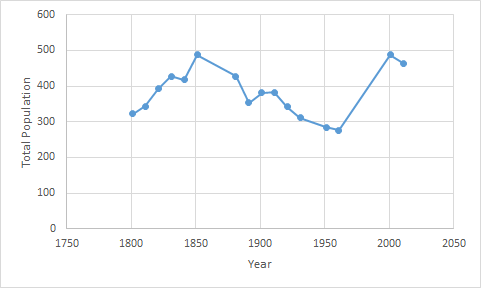
Population time series for Hessett

From the population time series created using data from Neighbourhood Statistics and Vision of Britain, it can be seen that there have been considerable changes in the population of Hessett. From 1801 when the first census record was carried out there was evidence of a general increase in the population until 1850. There is a decline in the population from 1850 to approximately the 1970s. This coincides with the mechanisation of agriculture and the need for fewer and fewer workers - it also coincides with two world wars which wiped out a significant proportion of the men in England. According to figures produced in the 1920s by the Central Statistical Office, the "total British Army casualties were 956,703". The most recent statistics, produced by the 2011 census, report one of the highest populations with a total of 464 residents. The rise can be attributed to the development of the village with more housing and its consequent growth as a commuter village for Bury St Edmunds, Stowmarket, and Ipswich.

== Housing ==
From the data of properties sold from 2015 the average housing pricing is relatively high as the average price for a detached house in Hessett in £314,681 with 8 properties being sold in the IP30 postcode (June 2015).
