= Bixley Division, Suffolk =

Electoral division of Suffolk, England

Bixley
- County Council constituency for the Suffolk County Council
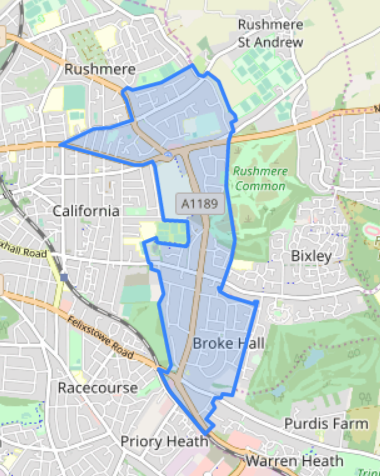
- Bixley Electoral Division
- District: Ipswich
- Region: East of England
- Population: 6,895 (2019)
- Electorate: 5,717 (2021)
- Major settlements: Broke Hall

Current constituency
- Created: 1973
- Seats: 1
- Councillor: Paul West (Conservative)
- Local council: Ipswich Borough Council

Bixley Division is an electoral division of Suffolk which returns one county councillor to Suffolk County Council.

== Geography ==
It is located in the North East Area of Ipswich and equates to Bixley Ward of Ipswich Borough Council.

== Members for Bixley ==
=== Two Seats (1973–85) ===
Member	Party	Term	Member	Party	Term
C Jones	Conservative	1973–1981	D Farthing	Conservative	1973–1985
Nina Alcock	Conservative	1981–1985	D Farthing	Conservative	1973–1985

=== One Seat (1985–present) ===
Member	Party	Term
Nina Alcock	Conservative	1985–1997
Russell Harsant	Conservative	1997–2012
Alan Murray	Conservative	2012–2016
Paul West	Conservative	2016–present

== Election results ==
=== Elections in the 2020s ===
2021 Suffolk County Council election: Bixley
Party	Candidate	Votes	%	±%
Conservative	Paul West *	1,649	61.6	▲5.9
Labour	Paul Bones	636	23.8	▲0.1
Green	Stephanie Cullen	244	9.1	N/A
Liberal Democrats	Trevor Powell	147	5.5	▼2.9
Majority		1,013	37.8	▲5.8
Turnout		2,696	47.1	▲15.1
Registered electors		5,718		
Conservative hold		Swing	▲2.9	
