= Rushmere Division, Suffolk =

Electoral division of Suffolk, England

Rushmere
- County Council constituency for the Suffolk County Council
- District: Ipswich
- Region: East of England
- Population: 9,349 (2019)
- Electorate: 7,306 (2021)
- Major settlements: Rushmere

Current constituency
- Created: 1973
- Seats: 1
- Councillor: Sandy Martin (Labour and Co-operative)
- Local council: Ipswich Borough Council

Rushmere Division is an electoral division of Suffolk which returns one county councillor to Suffolk County Council.

== Geography ==
It is located in the North East Area of Ipswich and comprises the whole of Rushmere Ward plus part of St John's Ward, both of which are electoral wards of Ipswich Borough Council.

== Members for Rushmere ==
Member	Party	Term
L Grimwood	Labour	1973–1977
D Hamilton Lowe	Conservative	1977–1985
P Koppel	Labour	1985–1989
G Auton	Labour	1989–1993
John Le Grys	Labour	1993–2005
Sue Thomas	Labour	2005–2009
Judy Terry	Conservative	2009–2013
Sandra Gage	Labour	2013–2021
Sandy Martin	Labour and Co-operative	2021–present

== Election results ==
=== Elections in the 2020s ===
2021 Suffolk County Council election: Rushmere
Party	Candidate	Votes	%	±%
Labour Co-op	Sandy Martin	1,357	43.2	–7.4
Conservative	Paul Cawthorn	1,322	42.0	+6.8
Green	Rachel Morris	234	7.4	+4.3
Liberal Democrats	Timothy Lockington	231	7.3	+1.6
Majority		35	1.1	–14.2
Turnout		3,172	43.4	+4.3
Registered electors		7,306		
Labour Co-op hold		Swing	–7.1	
