= Sandy Martin (politician) =

Former UK Member of Parliament (born 1957)

Cllr Sandy Martin
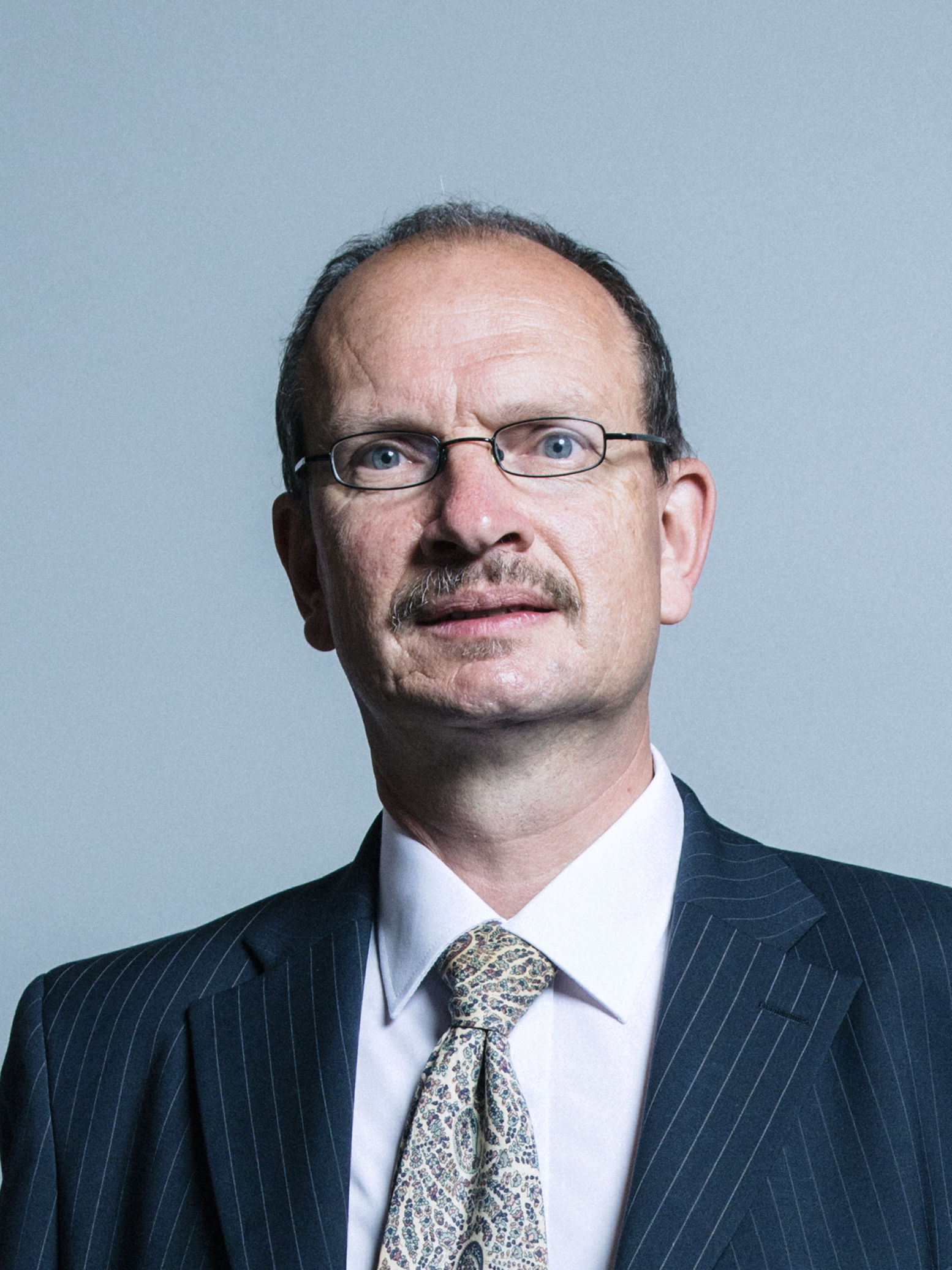
- Official portrait, 2017

Shadow Minister for Waste and Recycling
- In office 25 October 2018 – 12 December 2019
- Leader: Jeremy Corbyn
- Preceded by: Position established
- Succeeded by: Alan Whitehead

Member of Parliament for Ipswich
- In office 8 June 2017 – 6 November 2019
- Preceded by: Ben Gummer
- Succeeded by: Tom Hunt

Labour Group Leader on Suffolk County Council
- In office May 2009 – June 2017
- Deputy: Bryony Rudkin; Sarah Adams; Sandra Gage
- Preceded by: Bryony Rudkin
- Succeeded by: Sandra Gage

Suffolk County Councillor for Rushmere
- Incumbent
- Assumed office 6 May 2021
- Preceded by: Sandra Gage

Suffolk County Councillor for St John's
- In office 1 May 1997 – 20 July 2017
- Preceded by: Michael Hyde
- Succeeded by: Sarah Adams

Personal details
- Born: Alexander Gordon Martin; 2 May 1957 (age 68)
- Party: Labour; Labour and Co-operative (2021-); Socialist Workers Party (1980s)
- Website: sandyofipswich.co.uk

Alexander Gordon Martin (born 2 May 1957) is a British politician who served as the Member of Parliament (MP) for Ipswich from 2017 to 2019. A member of the Labour Party, he was elected in the 2017 general election, beating Conservative incumbent Ben Gummer. On 25 October 2018, he became Shadow Minister for Waste and Recycling. He lost his seat at the 2019 general election.

In May 2021, Martin was elected to Suffolk County Council as a Labour and Co-operative councillor.

== Early life ==
Martin was born on 2 May 1957; his father was the late Scottish actor Trevor Martin. Martin sang as a chorister in Winchester Cathedral from the age of 8 to 13. After his parents divorced, Martin moved with his mother and siblings to Halesworth in Suffolk in 1971. He worked at the National Peace Council in London from 1983 to 1987, and then at the National Trust at Dunwich Heath from 1989 to 1992. Martin moved to Ipswich to live with his partner in 1993, and worked at Ipswich Community Resource Centre from 1994 to 1996. In 1995, he took on the role of Coordinator of Ipswich Friends of the Earth, which he relinquished in 1997 after his election to Suffolk County Council.

== Early political career ==
After serving on Halesworth Town Council, standing for election to Waveney District Council and Ipswich Borough Council, Martin was elected as a councillor for St John's Division in Ipswich on Suffolk County Council in 1997. As chair of Suffolk's Joint Municipal Waste Management Strategy, Martin introduced a three-bin collection system across most of Suffolk, raising the recycling rate in the county from approximately 14.5% to approximately 45% between 2001 and 2004.

Martin led the Labour group on the County from 2009 to 2017. He also sat on Ipswich Borough Council from 2002 to 2014; in this capacity he introduced a more efficient bin-collection system, lobbied successfully for cycle lanes in the town centre, and led the installation of solar panels on sports centre roofs. He stood down as a borough councillor in 2014 to focus on his duties as leader of the County Council Labour group, and stood down as a county councillor on 20 July 2017 after being elected to Parliament.

At the 2014 European Parliament election, Martin stood as a Labour candidate for the East of England. He was third on the party's list, with only their first-placed candidate, incumbent Richard Howitt, being elected.

== Parliamentary career ==
Martin was elected as MP for Ipswich at the snap 2017 general election, defeating incumbent Conservative MP Ben Gummer, who had helped write the party's manifesto. As an MP, Martin was a member of the Public Administration and Constitutional Affairs Select Committee and the Environment, Food and Rural Affairs Select Committee. On 25 October 2018, he became Shadow Minister for Waste and Recycling.

He is a member of LGBT Labour, Labour Friends of Israel, and of Labour Friends of Palestine & The Middle East. He supports proportional representation and is chair of the Labour Campaign for Electoral Reform. Martin describes himself politically as a democratic socialist and an environmentalist.

Martin lost his seat in another snap national election, held in 2019, to Tom Hunt of the Conservative Party. In his concession speech, Martin criticised the Conservatives, stating that "the only way that we can win elections in this country now is by lying".

== After Parliament ==
In Martin's concession speech after losing his parliamentary seat, he said "It's very unlikely I will be standing for elected office again". However, at the 2021 local elections, he successfully contested the Rushmere Division (based around the area of that name, and part of his former constituency) on Suffolk County Council. Martin won over his Conservative opponent by just 35 votes, and thus returned to the council he was a member of until 2017. He was elected as a Labour and Co-operative councillor.

He is currently the Deputy leader of the Labour group.

== Personal life ==
Martin is gay, and has lived with his civil partner for over 25 years.

Parliament of the United Kingdom
Preceded by Ben Gummer	Member of Parliament for Ipswich; 2017–2019	Succeeded by Tom Hunt
