= 2021 Suffolk County Council election =

2021 UK local government election

- 6 May 2021

All 75 seats to Suffolk County Council 38 seats needed for a majority

	First party	Second party	Third party
Leader	Matthew Hicks	Elfrede Brambley-Crawshaw	Sarah Adams
Party	Conservative	Green	Labour
Leader since	11 May 2018	7 May 2019	December 2017
Leader's seat	Thredling	Beccles (Retiring)	St John's
Last election	52 seats, 46.3%	3 seats, 6.0%	11 seats, 20.7%
Seats before	48	3	11
Seats won	55	9	5
Seat change	▲3	▲6	▼6
Popular vote	124,969	39,283	55,973
Percentage	47.6%	15.0%	21.3%
Swing	▲1.3%	▲6.8%	▲0.6%
	Fourth party	Fifth party	Sixth party
Leader	Penny Otton	N/A	Victor Lukaniuk
Party	Liberal Democrats	Independent	WSI
Leader since	7 May 2019	N/A	May 2017
Leader's seat	Thedwastre South	N/A	Brandon
Last election	5 seats, 10.5%	3 seats, 4.3%	1 seats, 0.9%
Seats before	5	6	1
Seats won	4	1	1
Seat change	▼1	▼2	Steady
Popular vote	25,885	11,723	1,959
Percentage	9.9%	4.5%	0.8%
Swing	▼3.8%	▼0.2%	▼0.1%
- Map showing the results of the 2021 Suffolk County Council election

- Makeup of council after the election
Leader before election
Matthew Hicks
Conservative
Leader after election
Matthew Hicks
Conservative

The 2021 Suffolk County Council election took place on 6 May 2021 as part of the 2021 local elections in the United Kingdom. All 75 councillors were elected from 63 electoral divisions, which return either one or two county councillors each, by first-past-the-post voting, for a four-year term of office.

Voters who live in divisions which elect two councillors (12 divisions) are entitled to cast a maximum of two votes, while those living in divisions only electing one councillor (51 divisions) are only entitled to cast one vote.

The council was subject to a Local Government Boundary Commission for England review. The commission published final recommendations in September 2021, after the election, and the Suffolk (Electoral Changes) Order 2022 reduced the number of councillors from 75 to 70 for the next county council election, which was postponed from 2025 to 2026.

== Previous composition ==
=== 2017 election ===
Party	Seats
Conservative	52
Labour	11
Liberal Democrats	5
Green	3
Independent	3
West Suffolk Independents	1
Total	75

=== Composition of council seats before election ===
Party	Seats
Conservative	48
Labour	11
Liberal Democrats	5
Green	3
Independent	6
West Suffolk Independents	1
Vacant	1
Total	75

=== Changes between elections ===
In between the 2017 election and the 2021 election, the following council seats changed hands outside of by-elections:

Division	Date	Previous Party	New Party	Cause	Resulting Council Composition					
Division	Date	Previous Party	New Party	Cause	Con	Lab	LDem	Grn	Ind	WSI
Gunton	2 August 2018	Conservative	Independent	Councillor expelled from the party.	51	11	5	3	4	1
Haverhill Cangle	21 February 2019	Conservative	Independent	Councillor quit party to sit as an independent member.	50	11	5	3	5	1
Tower	4 December 2019	Independent	Conservative	Independent Councillor joined Conservatives.	51	11	5	3	4	1
Carlford	9 June 2020	Conservative	Vacant	Sitting councillor resigned.	50	11	5	3	4	1
Thedwastre North	4 December 2020	Conservative	Independent	Councillor quit party to sit as an independent member.	49	11	5	3	5	1
Hoxne & Eye	9 April 2021	Conservative	Independent	Councillor quit party to sit as an independent member.	48	11	5	3	6	1

== Summary ==
The county saw a marked contrast between its rural and urban areas. The ruling Conservative administration made 8 gains across Bury St Edmunds, Ipswich and Lowestoft, but lost 5 divisions in rural Suffolk that it had won four years earlier and was traditionally stronger. The Green Party replaced Labour as the second largest party, and the latter were subsequently relegated to 5 seats. The Liberal Democrats continued their descent after making losses in 2013 and 2017, with a further loss. The Independents also finished one seat lower than 2017. With 55 seats, the Conservatives were subsequently returned for a fifth term in office and scored their joint second best number of seats (equalling 2009) since the council was created in 1973.

=== Election result ===
2021 Suffolk County Council election
Party	Candidates	Seats	Gains	Losses	Net gain/loss	Seats %	Votes %	Votes	+/−
Conservative	74	55	8	5	▲3	73.3	48.0	124,969	+1.7
Green	59	9	6	0	▲6	12.0	15.1	39,283	+6.9
Labour	74	5	0	6	▼6	6.7	21.5	55,973	+0.8
Liberal Democrats	51	4	1	2	▼1	5.3	9.9	25,885	–3.8
Independent	25	1	0	2	▼2	1.3	4.5	11,723	+0.2
WSI	3	1	0	0	Steady	1.3	0.8	1,959	–0.1
Communist	2	0	0	0	Steady	0.1	0.1	293	N/A
Burning Pink	1	0	0	0	Steady	0.0	0.1	168	N/A
Total	289	75						260,253	

=== Election of Group Leaders ===
Matthew Hicks (Thredling) was re-elected leader of the Conservative Group, with Richard Rout (Hardwick) as his deputy.

Andrew Stringer (Upper Gipping) was elected leader of the joint Green, Lib Dem and Independent group, with Robert Lindsay (Cosford) as his deputy.

Sarah Adams (St John's) was re-elected leader of the Labour Group, with Sandy Martin (Rushmere) as her deputy.

=== Election of Leader of the Council ===
Matthew Hicks the leader of the Conservative group was duly elected leader of the council and formed a Conservative administration.

== Results by district ==
=== Babergh ===
Summary

Babergh District Summary
Party	Seats	+/-	Votes	%	+/-
Conservative	6	Steady	11,105	40.4	+0.9
Green	3	▲2	6,479	23.5	+14.4
Independent	1	Steady	4,541	16.5	+5.3
Labour	0	▼1	3,010	10.9	–2.1
Liberal Democrat	0	▼1	2,386	8.7	–13.5
Total	10	Steady	27,744	38.7	
Registered electors			71,696	–	

Division results

Belstead Brook
Party	Candidate	Votes	%	±%
Conservative	Christopher Hudson *	1,087	50.8	+9.9
Liberal Democrats	David Busby	721	33.7	–3.7
Labour	Keith Wade	333	15.6	+2.9
Majority		366	17.1	+13.6
Turnout		2,160	32.7	+0.9
Registered electors		6,613		–57
Conservative hold		Swing	–6.8	

Cosford
Party	Candidate	Votes	%	±%
Green	Robert Lindsay *	2,122	62.1	+13.8
Conservative	Jordon Millward	1,178	34.5	–10.5
Labour	Christopher Mills	115	3.4	+0.3
Majority		944	27.6	+24.3
Turnout		3,434	48.5	–0.2
Registered electors		7,076		+138
Green hold		Swing	+12.2	

Great Cornard
Party	Candidate	Votes	%	±%
Conservative	Peter Beer *	1,040	49.5	+0.6
Labour	Emma Bishton	586	27.9	–0.4
Liberal Democrats	Marjorie Bark	253	12.0	+3.5
Green	James Killbery	222	10.6	+5.6
Majority		454	21.6	+1.0
Turnout		2,125	29.8	+3.7
Registered electors		7,137		+50
Conservative hold		Swing	+0.5	

Hadleigh
Party	Candidate	Votes	%	±%
Conservative	Mick Fraser *	763	35.9	–3.7
Independent	Kathryn Grandon	647	30.4	N/A
Green	Gale Pryor	373	17.5	+14.0
Labour Co-op	Angela Wiltshire	172	8.1	–7.3
Liberal Democrats	Trevor Sheldrick	172	8.1	–29.1
Majority		116	5.5	+3.0
Turnout		2,162	33.0	+0.6
Registered electors		6,557		–62
Conservative hold		Swing	–17.1	

Melford
Party	Candidate	Votes	%	±%
Independent	Richard Kemp *	1,696	54.8	–1.2
Conservative	Peter Stevens	865	27.9	–0.2
Green	Ralph Carpenter	304	9.8	+5.3
Labour	Kimberley Clements	232	7.5	+0.3
Majority		831	26.9	–1.0
Turnout		3,132	38.3	+2.6
Registered electors		8,176		+184
Independent hold		Swing	–0.5	

Peninsula
Party	Candidate	Votes	%	±%
Green	Simon Harley	1,444	42.4	+39.1
Conservative	Mary Mclaren	1,029	30.2	+7.3
Independent	Alastair McCraw	699	20.5	N/A
Labour	Keith Rawlings	237	7.0	–1.0
Majority		415	12.2	
Turnout		3,425	42.8	+0.5
Registered electors		7,994		+8
Green gain from Liberal Democrats		Swing	+15.9	

Samford
Party	Candidate	Votes	%	±%
Conservative	Georgia Hall	1,968	56.8	+13.5
Independent	Mark Hurley	552	15.9	N/A
Green	Sallie Davies	545	15.7	N/A
Labour	Ian Perry	400	11.5	+2.2
Majority		1,416	40.9	+38.2
Turnout		3,491	42.7	+0.1
Registered electors		8,178		+152
Conservative hold		Swing	–1.2	

Stour Valley
Party	Candidate	Votes	%	±%
Conservative	James Finch	1,499	50.6	–0.8
Liberal Democrats	Bryn Hurren	1,072	36.2	+1.4
Labour	Olivia Hughes	200	6.8	+0.8
Green	Jane Carruthers	191	6.4	+2.5
Majority		427	14.4	–2.2
Turnout		2,977	47.3	+4.2
Registered electors		6,301		–51
Conservative hold		Swing	–1.1	

Sudbury
Party	Candidate	Votes	%	±%
Green	Jessie Carter	1,056	42.0	+36.6
Conservative	Simon Sudbury	721	28.7	+0.9
Labour	Jake Thomas *	376	15.0	–15.6
Independent	Trevor Cresswell	192	7.6	N/A
Liberal Democrats	Robert Spivey	168	6.7	–4.9
Majority		335	13.3	+10.6
Turnout		2,535	36.5	+4.2
Registered electors		6,949		–78
Green gain from Labour		Swing	+26.1	

Sudbury East & Waldingfield
Party	Candidate	Votes	%	±%
Conservative	Philip Faircloth-Mutton	955	41.7	–11.5
Independent	Margaret Maybury	410	17.9	N/A
Labour	Louise Fowler	359	15.7	–9.2
Independent	Luke Cresswell	345	15.1	N/A
Green	Theresa Munson	222	9.7	+5.5
Majority		545	23.8	–4.6
Turnout		2,303	34.3	+2.4
Registered electors		6,715		–190
Conservative hold		Swing	–14.7	

=== East Suffolk ===
East Suffolk District Summary
Party	Seats	+/-	Votes	%	+/-
Conservative	20	▼1	52,458	53.2	+3.7
Green	3	▲2	14,811	15.0	+5.4
Liberal Democrat	1	Steady	9,879	10.0	–0.1
Labour	0	▼1	20,202	21.2	–1.1
Independent	0	Steady	1,121	1.1	+0.2
Communist	0	Steady	173	0.2	N/A
Total	26	Steady	70,624	36.4	
Registered electors			193,836	–	

Division results

Aldeburgh and Leiston
Party	Candidate	Votes	%	±%
Conservative	T-J Haworth-Culf	1,828	66.6	+17.2
Labour	Ian Illett	918	33.4	+10.2
Majority		910	33.2	+7.0
Turnout		2,779	36.2	+1.2
Registered electors		7,678		+227
Conservative hold		Swing	+3.5	

Beccles (2)
Party	Candidate	Votes	%	±%
Green	Caroline Topping	2,594	52.0	+10.7
Green	Peggy McGregor	2,131		
Conservative	Mark Bee *	2,020	40.5	–1.8
Conservative	Graham Catchpole	1,769		
Labour	Christian Newsome	374	7.5	–2.7
Labour	Dom Taylor	368		
Majority		574	11.5	
Turnout		4,916	41.6	+0.3
Registered electors		11,811		+84
Green gain from Conservative				
Green hold				

Blything
Party	Candidate	Votes	%	±%
Conservative	Richard Smith *	1,523	48.7	▼4.1
Liberal Democrats	Andrew Turner	962	30.8	▲11.4
Labour	Philip Harle	640	20.5	▲2.7
Majority		561	17.9	▼15.6
Turnout		3,154	39.9	▼1.2
Registered electors		7,904		▲504
Conservative hold		Swing	▼7.8	

Bungay
Party	Candidate	Votes	%	±%
Conservative	Judy Cloke	1,335	44.0	▼9.1
Green	Annette Abbott	1,279	42.2	▲32.5
Labour	Donia Slyzuk	273	9.0	▼17.2
Liberal Democrats	John Awty	145	4.8	▼1.2
Majority		56	1.8	▼25.1
Turnout		3,045	41.4	▲1.9
Registered electors		7,347		▲23
Conservative hold		Swing	▼20.8	

Carlford
Party	Candidate	Votes	%	±%
Conservative	Elaine Bryce	2,056	63.2	+7.7
Green	Daniel Clery	698	21.4	+15.2
Labour	Alistair Dick	500	15.4	+5.5
Majority		1,358	41.8	+0.2
Turnout		3,287	45.3	+2.8
Registered electors		7,263		+265
Conservative hold		Swing	–3.7	

Felixstowe Coastal
Party	Candidate	Votes	%	±%
Conservative	Graham Newman *	3,335	49.5	–0.5
Conservative	Steve Wiles	3,073		
Liberal Democrats	Seamus Bennett	1,256	18.6	+2.6
Labour	Margaret Morris	1,223	18.2	+1.9
Labour	Richard Reaville	897		
Liberal Democrats	Jan Candy	874		
Green	Lesley Bennett	748	11.1	+4.8
Communist	Mark Jones	173	2.6	N/A
Majority		2,079	30.9	–2.9
Rejected ballots		29	0.3	
Turnout		6,121	39.3	+0.2
Registered electors		15,650		+239
Conservative hold		Swing	–1.5	
Conservative hold				

Felixstowe North & Trimley
Party	Candidate	Votes	%	±%
Conservative	Stuart Bird *	1,472	57.4	+8.2
Labour	David Rowe	1,094	42.6	+16.3
Majority		378	14.8	–7.1
Turnout		2,604	31.7	–3.3
Registered electors		8,213		+627
Conservative hold		Swing	–4.1	

Framlingham
Party	Candidate	Votes	%	±%
Conservative	Stephen Burroughes *	1,917	58.5	+2.0
Labour	Paul Theaker	754	23.3	+10.1
Liberal Democrats	John Mercer	572	17.6	+7.1
Majority		1,163	35.9	–7.7
Rejected ballots		34	1.0	+0.7
Turnout		3,277	42.2	+0.1
Registered electors		7,772		+745
Conservative hold		Swing	–4.1	

Gunton (2)
Party	Candidate	Votes	%	±%
Conservative	James Reeder	1,653	42.1	▲4.8
Conservative	Ryan Harvey	1,633		
Labour	Janet Craig	1,309	33.3	▼2.7
Labour	Keith Patience *	1,297		
Green	Jon Coxon	402	10.2	▲3.2
Independent	Steve Ardley *	362	9.2	N/A
Green	Peter Jackson	348		
Independent	Robin Hinton	201	5.1	N/A
Majority		344	8.8	▲7.5
Rejected ballots		8	0.2	
Turnout		3,872	25.6	▼1.9
Registered electors		15,124		▲131
Conservative hold		Swing	▲3.8	
Conservative gain from Labour				

Halesworth
Party	Candidate	Votes	%	±%
Green	Annette Dunning	1,546	48.8	+38.7
Conservative	Tony Goldson *	1,287	40.6	–12.9
Labour Co-op	Peter Coghill	254	8.0	–13.1
Liberal Democrats	Sarah Hunt	84	2.6	–6.0
Majority		259	8.2	
Turnout		3,194	42.6	+3.4
Registered electors		7,492		+111
Green gain from Conservative		Swing	▲25.9	

Kesgrave & Rushmere St Andrew (2)
Party	Candidate	Votes	%	±%
Conservative	Debbie McCallum	3,542	57.5	+6.7
Conservative	Stuart Lawson *	2,964		
Labour	Kevin Archer	1,160	18.8	–0.5
Labour	Lesley Bensley	848		
Liberal Democrats	Brad Clements	756	12.3	+4.5
Green	Harrison Foster	698	11.3	+6.1
Majority		2,382	38.7	+7.2
Turnout		5,451	34.5	+1.5
Registered electors		15,815		+274
Conservative hold		Swing	+1.5	
Conservative hold				

Kessingland & Southwold
Party	Candidate	Votes	%	±%
Conservative	Michael Ladd *	1,513	51.3	+2.4
Liberal Democrats	Adam Robertson	831	28.2	+10.7
Labour	Alan Green	608	20.6	+3.2
Majority		682	23.1	–8.3
Turnout		2,983	39.5	+1.2
Registered electors		7,558		+108
Conservative hold		Swing	–3.3	

Lowestoft South (2)
Party	Candidate	Votes	%	±%
Conservative	Jenny Ceresa *	2,094	51.5	+12.5
Conservative	Jamie Starling *	1,744		
Labour	Sonia Barker	1,220	30.0	+1.0
Labour	David Finnigan	1,016		
Green	Elise Youngman	416	10.2	+5.2
Liberal Democrats	Paul Light	337	8.3	+3.8
Green	Andrew Eastaugh	335		
Liberal Democrats	John Shreeve	215		
Majority		874	21.5	+11.4
Turnout		3,975	27.0	–1.0
Registered electors		14,713		–53
Conservative hold		Swing	+5.7	
Conservative hold				

Martlesham
Party	Candidate	Votes	%	±%
Conservative	Patti Mulcahy	2,356	62.3	−5.3
Liberal Democrats	Ski Evans	738	19.5	+7.3
Labour	Edward Lawrence	687	18.2	+6.3
Majority		1,618	42.8	–12.6
Turnout		3,807	40.8	–0.9
Registered electors		9,339		+296
Conservative hold		Swing	–6.3	

Oulton (2)
Party	Candidate	Votes	%	±%
Conservative	Edward Back	2,587	54.0	+5.7
Conservative	Keith Robinson *	2,404		
Labour	George King	1,311	27.4	–2.2
Labour	Nasima Begum	1,231		
Green	Peter Lang	410	8.6	+3.6
Green	David Youngman	406		
Independent	Jenny Hinton	349	7.2	N/A
Independent	Tony Knights	209		
Liberal Democrats	Dave O'Neill	133	2.8	–1.5
Majority		1,276	26.6	+7.9
Turnout		4,859	30.5	+0.2
Registered electors		15,923		+451
Conservative hold		Swing	+4.0	
Conservative hold				

Pakefield (2)
Party	Candidate	Votes	%	±%
Conservative	Melanie Vigo di Gallidoro *	2,025	56.9	+14.7
Conservative	Craig Rivett *	1,980		
Labour	Neil Coleby	928	26.1	–10.7
Labour	Tess Gandy	873		
Green	Alice Eastaugh	367	10.3	+5.4
Green	Lee Martin	342		
Liberal Democrats	Chris Thomas	238	6.7	+0.9
Liberal Democrats	Fiona Shreeve	160		
Majority		1,097	30.8	+25.5
Turnout		3,672	30.7	–0.3
Registered electors		11,958		–17
Conservative hold		Swing	+12.7	
Conservative hold				

Wickham
Party	Candidate	Votes	%	±%
Conservative	Alexander Nicoll *	1,659	45.9	–2.5
Green	Rachel Smith-Lyte	1,626	45.0	+37.0
Liberal Democrats	Sophie Williams	327	9.1	–12.1
Majority		33	0.9	–39.5
Turnout		3,638	41.2	+2.2
Registered electors		8,827		+497
Conservative hold		Swing	–19.8	

Wilford
Party	Candidate	Votes	%	±%
Conservative	Andrew Reid *	1,603	54.3	−2.5
Green	Thomas Daly	565	19.1	+6.5
Labour	John Cook	419	14.1	+2.9
Liberal Democrats	James Sandbach	364	12.2	+0.1
Majority		1,038	35.2	–9.0
Rejected ballots		27	0.9	+0.8
Turnout		2,978	42.4	+0.6
Registered electors		7,024		+372
Conservative hold		Swing	–4.5	

Woodbridge
Party	Candidate	Votes	%	±%
Liberal Democrats	Caroline Page *	1,887	63.5	+12.1
Conservative	Robin Sanders	1,086	36.5	+1.9
Majority		801	27.0	+10.2
Turnout		3,012	46.9	–0.1
Registered electors		6,425		+47
Liberal Democrats hold		Swing	+5.1	

=== Ipswich ===
Ipswich Borough Summary
Party	Seats	+/-	Votes	%	+/-
Conservative	6	▲4	20,957	41.0	+2.3
Labour	5	▼4	19,636	38.4	–5.7
Liberal Democrat	1	Steady	6,676	13.1	+1.0
Green	0	Steady	3,651	7.1	+2.8
Burning Pink	0	Steady	168	0.3	N/A
Total	12	Steady	51,088	100.0	

Division results

Bixley
Party	Candidate	Votes	%	±%
Conservative	Paul West *	1,649	61.6	▲5.9
Labour	Paul Bones	636	23.8	▲0.1
Green	Stephanie Cullen	244	9.1	N/A
Liberal Democrats	Trevor Powell	147	5.5	▼2.9
Majority		1,013	37.8	▲5.8
Turnout		2,696	47.1	▲15.1
Registered electors		5,718		▲67
Conservative hold		Swing	▲2.9	

Bridge
Party	Candidate	Votes	%	±%
Labour	Rob Bridgeman	1,095	43.3	▼6.7
Conservative	Mike Scanes	1,004	39.7	▲9.3
Green	Brieanna Jade Skie Patmore	292	11.5	▲4.1
Liberal Democrats	Martin Hore	139	5.5	0.0
Majority		91	4.6	▼15.0
Turnout		2,560	30.7	▲3.7
Registered electors		8,386		▲704
Labour hold		Swing	–7.5	

Chantry (2)
Party	Candidate	Votes	%	±%
Conservative	Nadia Cenci	2,895	48.5	+8.6
Conservative	Nathan Wilson	2,337		
Labour	Helen Armitage *	2,255	37.8	–4.7
Labour	Peter Gardiner *	1,970		
Green	Martin Hynes	529	8.9	N/A
Liberal Democrats	Adam Merritt	291	4.9	–0.3
Liberal Democrats	Lucy Margaret Drake	281		
Majority		640	10.7	
Turnout		5,777	34.4	+2.9
Registered electors		16,793		+307
Conservative gain from Labour		Swing	+6.7	
Conservative gain from Labour				

Gainsborough
Party	Candidate	Votes	%	±%
Conservative	Liz Harsant	1,673	52.9	+11.7
Labour	Stephen Connelly	1,162	36.8	–4.5
Liberal Democrats	Conrad Packwood	254	8.0	+5.1
Green	Jenny Rivett	71	2.2	–2.0
Majority		511	16.1	
Turnout		3,188	39.6	+7.4
Registered electors		8,041		–49
Conservative gain from Labour		Swing	+8.1	

Priory Heath
Party	Candidate	Votes	%	±%
Labour	William (Bill) Quinton *	1,030	45.7	–3.8
Conservative	Edward Phillips	912	40.5	+6.3
Green	Andy Patmore	202	9.0	+5.2
Liberal Democrats	Nicholas Jacob	110	4.9	–0.1
Majority		118	5.2	–10.2
Turnout		2,267	34.0	+5.5
Registered electors		6,670		+104
Labour hold		Swing	–5.1	

Rushmere
Party	Candidate	Votes	%	±%
Labour Co-op	Sandy Martin	1,357	43.2	–7.4
Conservative	Paul Cawthorn	1,322	42.0	+6.8
Green	Rachel Morris	234	7.4	+4.3
Liberal Democrats	Timothy Lockington	231	7.3	+1.6
Majority		35	1.1	–14.2
Turnout		3,172	43.4	+4.3
Registered electors		7,306		+90
Labour Co-op hold		Swing	–7.1	

St Helen's
Party	Candidate	Votes	%	±%
Labour	Elizabeth Johnson	1,426	47.3	–7.4
Conservative	Sachin Karale	1,009	33.5	+6.0
Green	Tom Wilmot	368	12.2	+6.3
Liberal Democrats	Paul Daley	212	7.0	–1.3
Majority		417	13.8	–13.4
Turnout		3,038	36.1	+5.5
Registered electors		8,405		+514
Labour hold		Swing	–6.7	

St John's
Party	Candidate	Votes	%	±%
Labour	Sarah Adams *	1,335	47.7	–9.9
Conservative	Ollie Rackham	1,098	39.2	+7.5
Green	Jude Rook	219	7.8	+2.1
Liberal Democrats	Robin Whitmore	148	5.3	+0.3
Majority		237	8.5	–17.4
Turnout		2,819	39.7	+3.7
Registered electors		7,104		+430
Labour hold		Swing	–8.7	

St Margaret's & Westgate (2)
Party	Candidate	Votes	%	±%
Liberal Democrats	Inga Lockington *	2,590	32.8	–2.6
Conservative	Debbie Richards	2,195	27.8	–2.5
Labour	Assis Carreiro	1,989	25.2	–4.2
Liberal Democrats	Oliver Holmes	1,840		
Labour	Stefan Long	1,517		
Green	Kirsty Wilmot	965	12.2	+7.2
Burning Pink	Tina Smith	168	2.1	N/A
Majority		395	5.0	–0.1
Turnout		6,612	42.6	+2.4
Registered electors		15,503		+323
Liberal Democrats hold		Swing	–0.1	
Conservative hold				

Whitehouse & Whitton (2)
Party	Candidate	Votes	%	±%
Conservative	David Goldsmith *	2,546	46.4	+8.5
Conservative	Sam Murray	2,317		
Labour	Sophie Meudec	2,130	38.8	+1.7
Labour	Christine Shaw	1,734		
Green	John Mann	527	9.6	+3.7
Liberal Democrats	Martin Pakes	286	5.2	–0.1
Liberal Democrats	Gerald Pryke	147		
Majority		416	7.8	+6.9
Rejected ballots		60	0.6	▲0.5
Turnout		5,350	33.8	▲4.5
Registered electors		15,823		▲576
Conservative hold		Swing	+3.4	
Conservative gain from Labour				

=== Mid Suffolk ===
Mid Suffolk District Summary
Party	Seats	+/-	Votes	%	+/-
Conservative	5	▼2	14,135	44.9	–4.4
Green	3	▲2	6,485	20.6	+5.8
Liberal Democrat	2	Steady	5,344	17.0	–3.4
Labour	0	Steady	3,712	11.8	+0.5
Independent	0	Steady	1,804	5.7	N/A
Total	10	Steady	31,655	36.7	
Registered electors			80,933	–	

Division results

Bosmere
Party	Candidate	Votes	%	±%
Conservative	Kay Oakes *	1,357	49.4	+3.4
Liberal Democrats	Steve Phillips	1,034	37.7	–1.2
Labour	Suzanne Britton	355	12.9	+5.1
Majority		323	11.8	+4.6
Turnout		2,774	34.5	+1.8
Registered electors		8,045		
Conservative hold		Swing	+2.3	

Gipping Valley
Party	Candidate	Votes	%	±%
Conservative	Chris Chambers	1,478	54.3	+15.3
Liberal Democrats	Adrienne Marriott	806	29.6	–10.5
Labour	Terence Wilson	438	16.1	+6.4
Majority		672	24.7	
Rejected ballots		13	0.5	+0.2
Turnout		2,735	34.7	–0.2
Registered electors		7,893		+495
Conservative gain from Liberal Democrats		Swing	+12.9	

Hartismere
Party	Candidate	Votes	%	±%
Conservative	Jessica Fleming *	1,900	57.5	–3.7
Green	Stuart Masters	649	19.6	+4.1
Labour	Eddie Dougall	532	16.1	+1.5
Liberal Democrats	David Appleton	224	6.8	–1.9
Majority		1,251	37.9	–7.8
Turnout		3,320	41.0	+3.9
Registered electors		8,104		
Conservative hold		Swing	–3.9	

Hoxne & Eye
Party	Candidate	Votes	%	±%
Conservative	Peter Gould	1,467	45.0	–11.8
Independent	Guy McGregor *	806	24.7	N/A
Liberal Democrats	Timothy Glenton	623	19.1	+4.6
Labour	Paul Anderson	363	11.1	–3.2
Majority		661	20.3	–22.1
Turnout		3,279	42.9	+0.7
Registered electors		7,642		
Conservative hold		Swing	–18.3	

Stowmarket North & Stowupland
Party	Candidate	Votes	%	±%
Green	Keith Welham	1,512	45.6	+15.9
Conservative	Gary Green *	1,373	41.4	–8.1
Labour	Will Howman	433	13.1	–1.0
Majority		139	4.2	
Turnout		3,323	33.8	+4.9
Registered electors		10,461		
Green gain from Conservative		Swing	+12.0	

Stowmarket South
Party	Candidate	Votes	%	±%
Liberal Democrats	Keith Scarff	1,030	40.3	▲7.5
Conservative	Nick Gowrley *	854	33.4	▼4.9
Labour	Emma Bonner-Morgan	380	14.9	▲2.1
Independent	David Card	292	11.4	N/A
Majority		176	6.9	
Turnout		2,580	34.7	▲3.3
Registered electors		7,462		
Liberal Democrats gain from Conservative		Swing	+6.2	

Thedwastre North
Party	Candidate	Votes	%	±%
Green	Andy Mellen	1,472	40.6	▲19.0
Conservative	Harry Richardson	1,226	34.0	▼28.2
Independent	Jane Storey *	706	19.6	N/A
Labour	Ursula Ajimal	199	5.5	▼3.9
Majority		246	6.8	
Rejected ballots		20	0.5	▲0.4
Turnout		3,623	42.7	▲5.3
Registered electors		8,497		
Green gain from Conservative		Swing	+23.6	

Thedwastre South
Party	Candidate	Votes	%	±%
Liberal Democrats	Penny Otton *	1,435	46.0	▼0.7
Conservative	John Augustine	1,321	42.3	▼1.5
Labour	Philip Cockell	364	11.7	▲2.2
Majority		114	3.7	▲0.8
Rejected ballots		26	0.8	▲0.7
Turnout		3,148	43.4	▲3.3
Registered electors		7,260		
Liberal Democrats hold		Swing	+0.4	

Thredling
Party	Candidate	Votes	%	±%
Conservative	Matthew Hicks *	2,084	63.2	–6.8
Green	Helen Bridgeman	602	18.3	N/A
Labour	Kathleen Hardy	417	12.7	–2.7
Liberal Democrats	Mark Pearson	192	5.8	–9.6
Majority		1,482	45.0	–11.7
Turnout		3,297	42.6	+3.9
Registered electors		7,733		
Conservative hold		Swing	–12.5	

Upper Gipping
Party	Candidate	Votes	%	±%
Green	Andrew Stringer *	2,250	63.3	+9.7
Conservative	Kieran Lathangue-Clayton	1,075	30.2	–6.8
Labour	Julie Reynolds	231	6.5	+1.1
Majority		1,175	33.0	+16.6
Turnout		3,576	45.6	+5.9
Registered electors		7,836		
Green hold		Swing	+8.2	

=== West Suffolk ===
West Suffolk District Summary
Party	Seats	+/-	Votes	%	+/-
Conservative	13	▲2	26,314	51.1	+2.6
WSI	1	Steady	1,959	3.8	±0.0
Labour	0	Steady	9,413	18.3	–0.4
Green	0	Steady	7,857	15.3	+11.8
Independent	0	Steady	4,257	8.3	–3.0
Liberal Democrat	0	Steady	1,600	3.1	–5.9
Communist	0	Steady	120	0.2	N/A
Total	15	Steady	43,598	34.5	
Registered electors			126,508	–	

Division results

Blackbourn
Party	Candidate	Votes	%	±%
Conservative	Joanna Spicer *	2,421	70.7	▼11.0
Green	Warren Lakin	534	15.6	N/A
Labour	John Bailey	469	13.7	▼4.6
Majority		1,887	55.1	▼8.2
Turnout		3,449	41.4	+2.6
Registered electors		8,333		
Conservative hold		Swing	▼13.3	

Brandon
Party	Candidate	Votes	%	±%
West Suffolk Independents	Victor Lukaniuk *	808	41.0	–5.9
Conservative	Christine Mason	766	38.8	+10.7
Labour	Susan Dean	298	15.1	+3.0
Green	William Tanner	101	5.1	N/A
Majority		42	2.1	–16.6
Turnout		1,984	28.4	–1.2
Registered electors		6,992		
WSI hold		Swing	–8.3	

Clare
Party	Candidate	Votes	%	±%
Conservative	Bobby Bennett	2,322	63.3	–3.5
Labour	Kerry Rogers	704	19.2	+9.5
Green	Julius Bell	642	17.5	N/A
Majority		1,618	44.1	–7.8
Turnout		3,695	41.1	–1.0
Registered electors		8,993		+274
Conservative hold		Swing	–6.5	

Eastgate & Moreton Hall
Party	Candidate	Votes	%	±%
Conservative	Peter Thompson	973	35.3	▼1.1
Independent	Trevor Beckwith *	788	28.6	▼12.8
Labour	Lorraine Allcocks	378	13.7	▲1.6
Green	Jessica Livsey	266	9.7	N/A
Independent	Frank Warby	266	9.7	N/A
Liberal Democrats	Daniel Linehan	84	3.0	▼7.0
Majority		185	6.7	▲1.7
Rejected ballots		17	0.6	▲0.4
Turnout		2,772	37.9	▲2.8
Registered electors		7,316		▲72
Conservative gain from Independent		Swing	▲5.8	

Exning & Newmarket
Party	Candidate	Votes	%	±%
Conservative	Rachel Hood *	1,025	40.8	+3.6
West Suffolk Independents	Chris O'Neill	683	27.2	+4.2
Labour	Craig Warren	579	23.0	–0.9
Green	Carrie Wheeler	227	9.0	N/A
Majority		342	13.6	+0.3
Rejected ballots		50	2.0	
Turnout		2,564	30.1	–1.0
Registered electors		8,531		+683
Conservative hold		Swing	–0.3	

Hardwick
Party	Candidate	Votes	%	±%
Conservative	Richard Rout *	1,806	61.6	+2.9
Labour	James Macpherson	448	15.3	–1.2
Green	Chris Dexter-Mills	350	11.9	+3.9
Liberal Democrats	Helen Korfanty	329	11.2	–5.6
Majority		1,358	46.3	+4.4
Turnout		2,956	44.2	+2.2
Registered electors		6,692		–8
Conservative hold		Swing	+2.1	

Haverhill Cangle
Party	Candidate	Votes	%	±%
Conservative	Joe Mason	1,994	52.2	+13.7
Conservative	Heike Sowa	1,429		
Labour	David Smith	869	22.7	–6.8
Labour	David Smith	864		
Independent	Aaron Luccarini	467	12.2	N/A
Independent	Paula Fox	411		
Green	Nicola Forsdyke	301	7.9	N/A
Green	Mandy Leathers	276		
Liberal Democrats	David Payne	189	4.9	–6.9
Majority		1,125	29.5	–9.1
Turnout		3,693	26.7	+0.6
Registered electors		13,849		+590
Conservative hold		Swing	+10.2	
Conservative hold				

Haverhill East & Kedington
Party	Candidate	Votes	%	±%
Conservative	David Roach *	1,188	57.4	+9.3
Labour	Damian Page	469	22.6	–1.5
Independent	Bruce Davidson	247	11.9	N/A
Green	Roger Mynott	167	8.1	N/A
Majority		719	34.7	+10.9
Turnout		2,076	29.7	+1.8
Registered electors		7,092		+90
Conservative hold		Swing	+5.5	

Mildenhall
Party	Candidate	Votes	%	±%
Conservative	Lance Stanbury	1,004	40.1	–25.4
Independent	Andy Neal	855	34.1	N/A
Labour	Patrick Finn	271	10.8	–4.0
Independent	David Chandler	163	6.5	–13.2
Green	Jack Blomfield	151	6.0	N/A
Liberal Democrats	Ben Avison	60	2.4	N/A
Majority		149	6.0	–39.8
Turnout		2,518	33.4	+2.6
Registered electors		7,537		+543
Conservative hold		Swing	–29.8	

Newmarket & Red Lodge
Party	Candidate	Votes	%	±%
Conservative	Andy Drummond *	1,232	46.9	–3.6
Labour	Christopher Swallow	497	18.9	+3.3
West Suffolk Independents	Andrew Appleby	468	17.8	+6.3
Green	Simon Morse	219	8.3	N/A
Liberal Democrats	Robert Pinsker	210	8.0	–0.9
Majority		735	28.0	–6.8
Turnout		2,653	25.7	–0.1
Registered electors		10,340		+1,051
Conservative hold		Swing	–3.4	

Row Heath
Party	Candidate	Votes	%	±%
Conservative	Colin Noble *	1,620	60.4	+8.1
Labour	Theresa Chipulina	387	14.4	+2.4
Independent	Don Waldron	369	13.8	N/A
Green	Claire Unwin	305	11.4	N/A
Majority		1,233	46.0	+8.4
Turnout		2,710	30.0	–3.0
Registered electors		9,168		+1,129
Conservative hold		Swing	+2.8	

Thingoe North
Party	Candidate	Votes	%	±%
Conservative	Beccy Hopfensperger *	1,961	64.7	▼8.1
Labour	Katie Parker	471	15.5	▼0.5
Green	Oliver King	369	12.2	N/A
Liberal Democrats	Ian Chapman	229	7.6	▼3.5
Majority		1,490	49.1	▼7.6
Turnout		3,052	41.5	▲3.1
Registered electors		7,363		▲219
Conservative hold		Swing	▼3.8	

Thingoe South
Party	Candidate	Votes	%	±%
Conservative	Karen Soons	2,192	64.7	▼2.8
Labour	Robin Davies	470	13.9	▲0.8
Green	Vicki Martin	467	13.8	▲13.9
Liberal Democrats	Libby Brooks	230	6.8	▼7.2
Majority		1,722	50.8	▼12.1
Turnout		3,388	43.4	▲0.9
Registered electors		7,808		▲491
Conservative hold		Swing	▼1.8	

Tower
Party	Candidate	Votes	%	±%
Conservative	Robert Everitt *	2,277	33.7	▲4.9
Conservative	David Nettleton *	2,104		
Green	Steph Holland	1,993	29.5	▲7.4
Green	Matthew Rowe	1,489		
Labour	Donna Higgins	1,409	20.8	▲5.2
Labour	Marilyn Sayer	830		
Independent	Frank Stennett	691	10.2	N/A
Liberal Democrats	David Poulson	269	4.0	▼2.3
Communist	Darren Turner	120	1.8	N/A
Majority		284	4.2	▲1.0
Rejected ballots		932	15.3	▲15.1
Turnout		6,090	36.9	▲3.8
Registered electors		16,494		▲928
Conservative hold		Swing	▼1.2	
Conservative gain from Independent				

*Note: Nettleton won a seat standing as an independent at the previous election.

== Post-election changes ==
=== Affiliation changes ===
- Peter Thompson, elected as a Conservative in 2021, was suspended from the party in April 2023 and resigned from the party the following month to sit as an independent.
- Christopher Hudson, elected as a Conservative in 2021, resigned from the party on the 6th September 2024 to join Reform UK. He was previously Deputy Leader of Suffolk County Council under Colin Noble.
- Sam Murray, elected as a Conservative in 2021, resigned from the Conservative group in September 2025 to sit as an independent.

=== By-elections ===
==== Beccles ====
Beccles: 17 November 2022
Party	Candidate	Votes	%	±%
Green	Ash Lever	2,114	70.5	+18.5
Conservative	Letitia Smith	624	20.8	–19.7
Labour	Christian Newsome	260	8.7	+1.2
Majority		1,490	49.7	+38.4
Turnout		3,006	25.7	−15.9
Registered electors		11,703		
Green hold		Swing	+19.1	

The Beccles by-election was called after the Green Party councillor, Peggy McGregor, stood down.

==== Felixstowe Coastal ====
Felixstowe Coastal: 4 May 2023
Party	Candidate	Votes	%	±%
Liberal Democrats	Seamus Bennett	2,519	44.4	+25.8
Conservative	Kevin Sullivan	2,060	36.3	–13.2
Green	Lesley Bennett	939	16.6	+5.5
Communist	Mark Jones	150	2.6	±0.0
Majority		459	8.1	
Turnout		5,740	36.5	−2.8
Registered electors		15,706		
Liberal Democrats gain from Conservative		Swing	+19.5	

The Felixstowe Coastal by-election was called after Graham Newman, the Conservative county councillor for the division since 2005 and a former chairman of Suffolk County Council, died on 28 December 2022 after a short illness.

==== Priory Heath ====
Priory Heath: 4 May 2023
Party	Candidate	Votes	%	±%
Labour	Lucy Smith	918	50.8	+5.1
Conservative	Gregor McNie	567	31.4	–9.1
Green	Andy Patmore	180	10.0	+1.0
Liberal Democrats	Trevor Powell	143	7.9	+3.0
Majority		351	19.4	+14.2
Turnout		1,820	27.3	
Registered electors		6,679		
Labour hold		Swing	+7.1	

The Priory Heath by-election was called after Labour councillor Bill Quinton, who had represented the division since 2003 and served as a councillor for 39 years, retired citing ill health.

==== Woodbridge ====
Woodbridge: 12 October 2023
Party	Candidate	Votes	%	±%
Liberal Democrats	Ruth Leach	990	51.2	–12.3
Conservative	Alan Porter	642	33.2	–3.3
Labour	Paul Richards	301	15.6	N/A
Majority		348	18.0	–9.0
Turnout		1,940	30.5	–16.4
Registered electors		6,363		
Liberal Democrats hold		Swing	-4.5	

The Woodbridge by-election was called after Liberal Democrat councillor Caroline Page, who had represented the division since 2008, died from lung cancer on 5 July 2023.

==== Pakefield (July 2024) ====
Pakefield: 4 July 2024
Party	Candidate	Votes	%	±%
Labour	Peter Byatt	2,680	40.0	+13.9
Conservative	Mark Bee	2,295	34.2	–22.7
Liberal Democrats	Adam Robertson	960	14.3	+7.6
Independent	Paul Light	767	11.4	N/A
Majority		385	5.8	N/A
Turnout		6,864	57.8	+27.1
Registered electors		11,881		
Labour gain from Conservative		Swing	▲18.3	

The Pakefield by-election was called following the resignation of Conservative councillor Craig Rivett.

==== Hoxne and Eye ====
Hoxne & Eye: 10 October 2024
Party	Candidate	Votes	%	±%
Conservative	Henry Lloyd	895	45.3	+0.3
Green	Joanne Brooks	891	45.1	N/A
Liberal Democrats	Timothy Glenton	102	5.2	−14.0
Labour	Paul Theaker	89	4.5	−6.6
Majority		4	0.2	−20.1
Turnout		1986	24.6	−18.3
Registered electors		7,992		
Conservative hold		Swing	+0.3	

The Hoxne and Eye by-election was called after Conservative councillor Peter Gould, who had represented the division since 2021, died on 19 July 2024, aged 71.

==== St John's ====
St John's by-election: 24 April 2025
Party	Candidate	Votes	%	±%
Labour Co-op	Adele Cook	600	28.0	–19.7
Green	Adria Pittock	458	21.4	+13.6
Reform	Michelle Bevan-Margetts	442	20.6	N/A
Liberal Democrats	Kelly Turner	323	15.1	+9.8
Conservative	James Harding	318	14.9	–24.3
Majority		142	6.6	–1.9
Turnout		2,144	29.8	–9.9
Registered electors		7,188		
Labour Co-op hold		Swing	▼16.7	

The St John's by-election was called following the resignation of Labour councillor Sarah Adams, Leader of the Labour Group on Suffolk County Council.

==== Tower ====
Tower by-election: 3 July 2025
Party	Candidate	Votes	%	±%
Reform	Martin Robinson	1,332	28.8	N/A
Green	Clare Higson	1,155	25.0	–4.5
Conservative	Joanna Rayner	808	17.5	–16.2
Labour Co-op	Judith Moore	667	14.4	–6.4
Independent	Frank Stennett	407	8.8	–1.4
Liberal Democrats	James Porter	259	5.6	+1.6
Majority		177	3.8	N/A
Turnout		4,633	27.2	–9.7
Registered electors		17,045		
Reform gain from Conservative				

The Tower by-election was called after Robert Everitt, the Conservative county councillor for the division and a former chairman of Suffolk County Council and Mayor of St Edmundsbury, died on 19 April 2025, aged 72.

==== Pakefield (December 2025) ====
Pakefield by-election: 18 December 2025 Death of Melanie Vigo di Gallidoro
Party	Candidate	Votes	%	±%
Reform	June Alison Mummery	1,286	49.2	N/A
Green	Dom Taylor	508	19.4	+9.1
Conservative	Letitia Smith	357	13.6	–43.3
Labour	Sonia Valerie Barker	328	12.5	−13.6
Liberal Democrats	Chris Thomas	137	5.2	−1.5
Majority		778	29.7	N/A
Turnout		2,619	22.6	−8.1
Registered electors		11,590		
Reform gain from Conservative		Swing	▲46.3	
