= Stradisphere Festival =

Annual music festival in Stradbroke, England

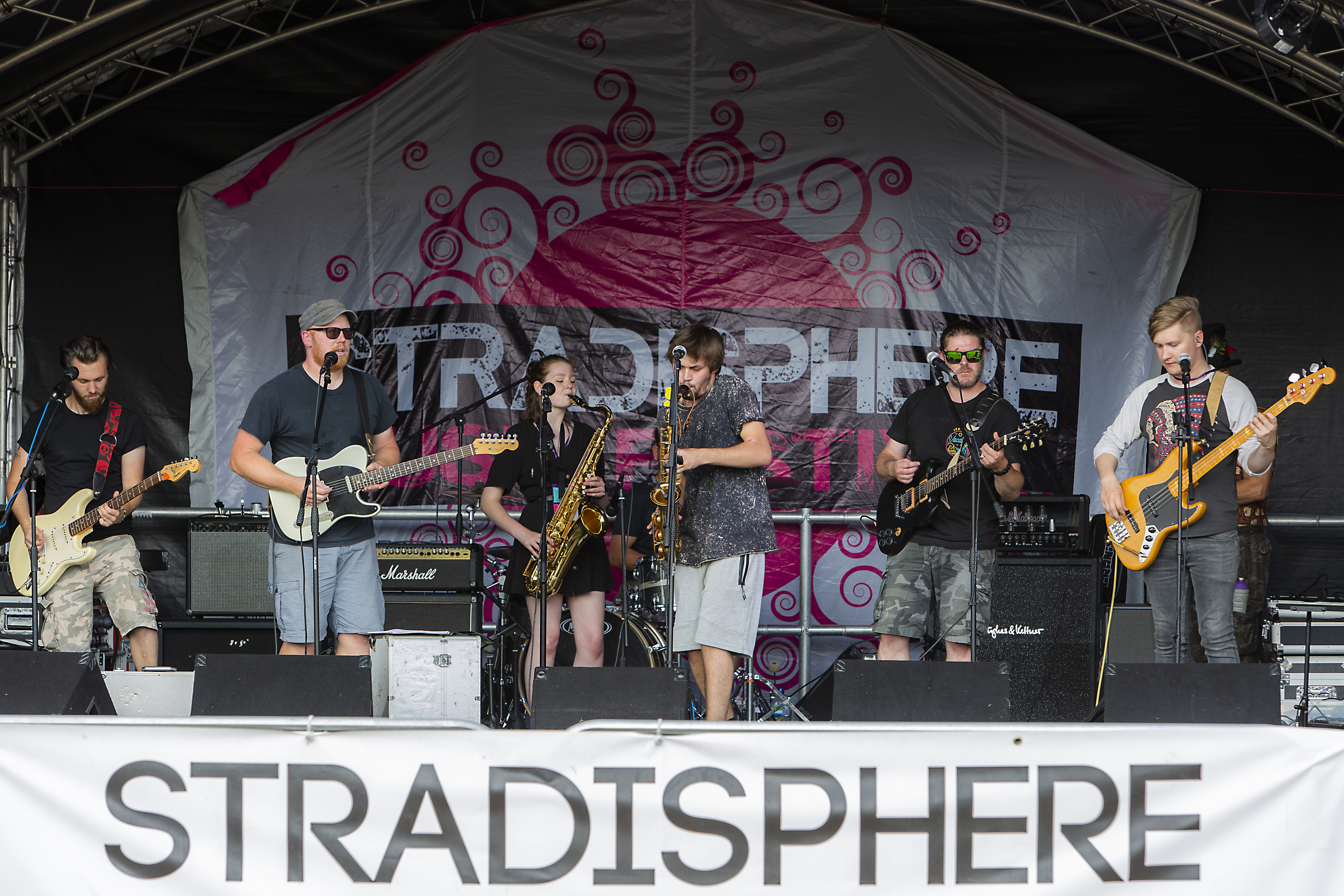
- Status: Deprecated
- Genre: Music festival
- Frequency: Annually
- Locations: Stradbroke, Suffolk, England
- Coordinates: 52.314361°N 1.270749°E,
- Years active: −2006–2007 years
- Inaugurated: July 2014
- Founder: Brett Baber and Jo Baber
- Most recent: 6 July 2018 – 7 July 2018
- Website: www.stradisphere.co.uk

Stradisphere Festival was an annual music festival held in Stradbroke, Suffolk, England, in July. It celebrated its 5th year in 2018 with headliners Badly Drawn Boy and Sam and the Womp.

The festival was founded by Brett and Jo Baber in 2014. Until 2018 the festival mostly had smaller and tribute bands performing, but has expanded and aspired to be 'a premier family music festival'.

To advertise the 2018 festival, organisers promoted the festival across Suffolk using a person dressed as a spaceman who visited local businesses and posed for photos in well-known locations.

Since the end of the COVID-19 pandemic, a smaller event has taken place, called the Stradbroke Music Day. This event takes place in July of every year for one day, in the same venue of the Stradbroke Community Centre. The acts present are usually smaller, independent artists and there are not many amenities present.
