= Will Tanner =

British Conservative politician

Will Tanner CBE

Downing Street Deputy Chief of Staff
- In office November 2022 – July 2024
- Prime Minister: Rishi Sunak
- Preceded by: Ruth Porter

Director of Onward
- In office May 2018 – November 2022

Personal details
- Party: Conservative
- Spouse: Lizzie Loudon

William Tanner CBE is a former British political adviser who most recently served as Deputy Chief of Staff to the former Prime Minister, Rishi Sunak.

== Career ==
Tanner served as one of Theresa May's special advisers from 2014 whilst she was Home Secretary and then when she was Prime Minister from 2016, until leaving in 2017 after the general election.

Tanner then worked for Portland Communications as a political adviser for a year, before becoming in May 2018 the co-founder and initial director of the think tank Onward.

When Rishi Sunak became Prime Minister, Tanner returned to Number 10 as Deputy Chief of Staff. In May 2024, during the 2024 general election campaign, Tanner was labelled by The Daily Telegraph as being the author of the Conservative Party's plan to bring in a new form of national service were they to win the election. He was criticised for his time in Government for "refus[ing] to suggest any number of immigrants as an upper limit".

Tanner was selected as the prospective parliamentary candidate for the seat of Bury St. Edmunds & Stowmarket in the 2024 General Election. He campaigned alongside his party duties, hoping to replace Jo Churchill. He was unsuccessful in his bid, receiving 15,293 votes (30.0%), thereby losing the traditionally safe Conservative seat to the Labour candidate (Peter Prinsley) by 1,452 votes.

== Honours ==
In April 2025, Tanner was appointed a Commander of the Order of the British Empire in the 2024 Prime Minister's Resignation Honours "for political and public service".
