= North East Area, Ipswich =

Administrative area of Ipswich, England

Coordinates: 52°03′25″N 1°12′03″E

The North East Area, Ipswich is one of five administrative areas in Ipswich, through which Ipswich Borough Council divides its spending and enables feedback from local residents, businesses and community groups.

The area is composed of three wards, each represented by three councillors. Each ward is also a Middle Layer Super Output Area (MSOA). As of the 2019 Ipswich Borough Council election, the councillors are as follows:

Ward	Councillor	Councillor	Councillor	MSOA
Bixley	Lee Reynolds	Edward Phillips	Richard Pope	Ipswich 009
Rushmere	Alasdair Ross	Stefan Long	Kelvin Cracknell	Ipswich 004
St John's	Neil McDonald	Elango Elavalakan	Michelle Darwin	Ipswich 008

These Councillors form the North East Area Committee of which Shelly (Michelle) Darwin is the chair. Three Suffolk County Council Councillors are co-opted members of the committee. The divisions they represent are either fully or partially in the South East Area:

District	Councillor
Bixley Division, Suffolk	Paul West
Rushmere Division, Suffolk	Sandra Gage
St John's Division, Suffolk	

The area is also covered by a Neighbourhood Watch network which comprises 35 neighbourhood watch schemes.
