= Ben Gummer =

British businessman and former politician

The Right Honourable Ben Gummer
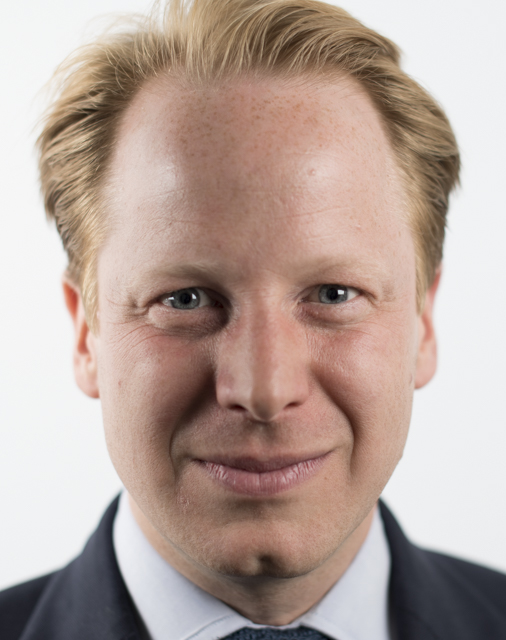
- Gummer in 2016

Minister for the Cabinet Office
- In office 14 July 2016 – 11 June 2017
- Prime Minister: Theresa May
- Preceded by: Matt Hancock
- Succeeded by: Damian Green

Paymaster General
- In office 14 July 2016 – 11 June 2017
- Prime Minister: Theresa May
- Preceded by: Matt Hancock
- Succeeded by: Mel Stride

Parliamentary Under-Secretary of State for Health Services
- In office 12 May 2015 – 14 July 2016
- Prime Minister: David Cameron
- Preceded by: Dan Poulter
- Succeeded by: Philip Dunne

Member of Parliament for Ipswich
- In office 6 May 2010 – 3 May 2017
- Preceded by: Chris Mole
- Succeeded by: Sandy Martin

Personal details
- Born: 19 February 1978 (age 48) London, England
- Party: Conservative
- Relations: Peter Gummer, Baron Chadlington (uncle)
- Parent: John Gummer
- Education: Peterhouse, Cambridge

Benedict Michael Gummer (born 19 February 1978) is a British businessman and former politician. He is a partner of Gummer Leathes, a property developer. He is a senior adviser to McKinsey & Company, the management consultancy, and a visiting fellow at the Blavatnik School of Government at Oxford University.

Gummer served as the Member of Parliament (MP) for Ipswich from 2010 to 2017. A member of the Conservative Party, he became Minister for the Cabinet Office and Paymaster General in the First May ministry in 2016, entering the cabinet as its youngest member. He lost his seat in the House of Commons in the 2017 general election.

== Early life and education ==
Gummer is the eldest child of former Conservative Cabinet Minister John Gummer, and Penelope Jane (née Gardner). John Gummer was MP for Suffolk Coastal until the 2010 general election, when he moved to the House of Lords. Gummer attended St Saviour's Church of England Primary School in Ealing, West London.

He was then privately educated. Firstly, between 1987 and 1991, he was a chorister at St John's College School, Cambridge, where he sang under George Guest and Christopher Robinson. And then at Tonbridge School in Kent, where Gummer was a music scholar.

Having won the Vellacott Historical Essay Prize, he graduated with a starred double first in History at Peterhouse, Cambridge, where he was an "exhibitioner" and "scholar".

=== Early business career ===
After graduating, Gummer ran a small engineering firm. Between 2005 and 2010, he was managing director of the family-owned Sancroft International, a corporate responsibility consultancy.^{[5]}

=== Historian ===
Gummer published a history of the Black Death, The Scourging Angel, in 2009. The book received favourable reviews. In The Times Literary Supplement, Jonathan Sumption commented that Gummer "establishes the facts more thoroughly than any of his predecessors". Andrew Roberts described it as a "moving and incisive history" and named it one of his 'Books of the Year' in The Daily Telegraph.

== Political career ==
Gummer was selected by open primary as the Conservative candidate in August 2007 for the Ipswich constituency. His main three pledges were the retention of services at Ipswich Hospital, a crackdown on binge drinking, and no new housing without provision of infrastructure. Gummer defeated incumbent Labour MP Chris Mole and became MP for the Ipswich constituency in the general election of 2010, enjoying the largest majority of any Conservative in Ipswich since 1935. In the 2015 election, Gummer was re-elected with an increased majority. In April 2017 Theresa May made him responsible for co-ordination of the Conservative manifesto alongside her former advisor Nick Timothy. He lost his seat in the 2017 election by a margin of 831 votes to the Labour candidate Sandy Martin.

=== Parliamentary interests ===
Before becoming a minister, Gummer sat on two separate finance bill committees, as well as those on childcare payments, defamation, legal aid, and terrorism prevention. He was a member of the UK parliamentary delegation to the Organization for Security and Co-operation in Europe (OSCE) and a patron of the Longford Trust.

=== Political views ===
Gummer used his maiden speech to argue for rapid deficit and debt reduction and penal reform. He has spoken strongly against votes for prisoners, but in favour of more constructive prison and probation sentences. He has described himself as "a libertarian" and has said that he has "absolutely no problem" with gay marriage, subsequently voting for it in Parliament. He also added his name to an amendment to clause one of the Protection of Freedoms Bill, which calls for the word 'insulting' to be dropped from section 5 of the Public Order Act. Gummer was strongly in favour of the United Kingdom remaining in the European Union and described himself as "devastated" by the result in favour of withdrawal from the EU in the Brexit referendum.

=== Tax statements ===
In 2012, Gummer proposed annual Tax Statements intended to show itemised spending per department in proportion to the amount the taxpayer paid in the year to date. Gummer's proposal was favourably received by the press in the UK and in the US by The Wall Street Journal It was included in the 2012 Budget and due for introduction in 2014 with George Osborne calling it "an excellent idea". The TaxPayers' Alliance subsequently honoured Gummer as their 'Pin-Up of the Month'.

It was also supported by the prime minister. Gummer's breakdown showed that someone with a salary of £25,500 in 2012 would be paying for the following through their income tax and national insurance contributions:

- £2,080 on pensions and benefits (including £212 on housing benefit and £296 on incapacity benefits);
- £1,094 on the NHS;
- £824 on education;
- £339 on defence;
- £160 on the police;
- £92 on roads;
- £71 on railway;
- £59 on overseas aid;
- £44 on prisons; and
- £28 to the European Union.

Gummer emphasised that this would help refute suggestions that most taxation goes to the EU, Africa or Trident.

=== Public debt management ===
In the financial dailies City AM and the Financial Times Gummer has called for Swedish style fiscal rules. While other MPs argued for a 'deficit ceiling', Gummer argued instead that the government should change the way it sets budgets, ensuring a budget surplus over the medium term. To this end, in the 2012–13 session of Parliament he introduced a Private Members' Bill titled the 'Public Debt Management Bill', the aim of which was to introduce rule whereby the Chancellor of the Exchequer must ensure that the budget is in surplus by at least 1% of over the course of each business cycle. The bill was not taken forward, although in 2015 rules along similar lines, with the Office for Budget Responsibility involved in the way Gummer's bill suggested, were adopted by the government.

=== Renaming National Insurance ===
In February 2014, Gummer brought in a ten minute rule bill to rename National Insurance contributions as an Earnings Tax. Although back-benchers were reported to be enthusiastic, the Treasury, which had launched a consultation exercise on it in 2011, is believed to have considered it too expensive.

=== Parliamentary Private Secretary ===
In May 2012, Gummer was appointed Parliamentary Adviser to Andrew, Lord Feldman, the Conservative Party co-chairman, helping him to develop the relationship between Conservative Campaign Headquarters and Conservative MPs. In September 2012, Gummer was promoted to Parliamentary Private Secretary to Alan Duncan, Minister of State for International Development, in the government reshuffle. Duncan was responsible for Asia, the Middle East, Caribbean and Overseas Territories, International Finance, International Relations (except the EU), Trade, and Corporate Performance Divisions.

In October 2013, he became PPS to the Education Secretary, Michael Gove. Following the 2014 reshuffle, Gummer became PPS to Nicky Morgan. In May 2015 he was appointed Parliamentary Under Secretary of State for Health.

=== Health Minister ===
Following the 2015 general election, Gummer became Parliamentary Under-Secretary of State for Care Quality in the Department of Health, one of the broadest junior ministerial briefs. Gummer's ministerial responsibilities included NHS hospitals, the NHS workforce, maternity care, patient safety and end of life care. Gummer's achievements include a new strategy to deal with high levels of stillbirths, the government commitment to ensure high quality, compassionate end of life care across the health system by 2020 and the introduction of reforms to nursing training and bursaries, which aim to create 10,000 more nursing, midwifery and allied health degree places and launching a consultation on a new nursing associate role. His ministerial role also involved him in the Junior Doctors' contract dispute and negotiations with the chair of the BMA junior doctors' committee Dr Johann Malawana. Gummer claimed that the new contract was "fair to all, including protected groups, whilst recognising the importance of the contract continuing to be built on equal pay principles". After a series of strikes the BMA returned to the negotiating table and agreed a deal with the government, although its membership rejected the deal, leading to Dr Malawana's resignation.

=== Minister for the Cabinet Office and Paymaster General ===
In July 2016, Gummer was promoted by new prime minister Theresa May to the position of Minister for the Cabinet Office and Paymaster General. His ministerial responsibilities included the development, co-ordination and implementation of government policy, management of the functions of government (people, digital, property, procurement and security), oversight of the civil service, constitutional issues, the resilience of the UK's infrastructure and cyber security. A profile of Gummer by Andrew Gimson for Conservative Home described him as "the most important minister whose role you've never heard of…Gummer enjoys the confidence of May and her advisers, who describe him as 'first class'".

=== Constituency projects ===
==== Upper Orwell Crossings ====
In October 2014, Gummer launched the campaign for a new Wet Dock Crossing, as the project was called at the time. The project consists of three proposed new crossings to the River Orwell close to Ipswich town centre. The purpose of the crossings is to facilitate regeneration and reduce congestion in the town. £2 million were awarded by the Government in the 2015 budget to allow detailed plans for the project to be drawn up. The business case for the crossings, which noted that for every £1 invested, the scheme would yield £5.73 of direct benefits was submitted to the governmental administration in January 2016. Gummer lobbied Chancellor of the Exchequer George Osborne for the money needed and in the budget 2016, Osborne announced that the government would be funding the crossings.

The project was subsequently renamed the Upper Orwell Crossings. Some of the project's supporters include: The New Anglia Local Enterprise Partnership, Ipswich Borough Council, The University of Suffolk, Suffolk Chamber of Commerce, Associated British Ports (the landowner), and Suffolk County Council who are responsible for delivering the project.

==== Railways ====
Gummer lobbied the Chancellor of the Exchequer for £500 million of investment into East Anglia's railways, along with Norwich North MP Chloe Smith and Witham MP Priti Patel, and has called for caps on rail fare increases.

== After politics ==
In January 2018, Gummer joined McKinsey & Company, and the Blavatnik School of Government at Oxford University. As of June 2018, he had not spoken in public since the 2017 election.

== Personal life ==
Gummer is married to Sarah Langford, a barrister in criminal and family law. They have two sons.

== Arms ==
Coat of arms of Ben Gummer

Crest
A cock wings elevated and addorsed Or beaked and combed jelloped and legged Gules grasping in the dexter claws a lily of the valley Argent slipped and leaved Or.
Escutcheon
Gules a cross potent nowy quadrate Argent between four escallops fukes inwards Or.
Motto
Duc In Altum (Put Out Into The Deep)

== Works ==
- The Scourging Angel: The Black Death in the British Isles. London: The Bodley Head. 2009. ISBN 9780224077675.

Parliament of the United Kingdom
Preceded by Chris Mole	Member of Parliament for Ipswich; 2010–2017	Succeeded by Sandy Martin
Political offices
Preceded by Matt Hancock	Minister for the Cabinet Office; 2016–2017	Succeeded by Damian Green
Preceded by Matt Hancock	Paymaster General; 2016–2017	Succeeded by Mel Stride
