= Stradbroke and Laxfield Ward =

Ward of Mid Suffolk district in Suffolk, England

The candidate information for the Stradbroke and Laxfield Ward in Mid-Suffolk, Suffolk, England.

== Councillors ==
Election	Member	Party
2011	Stuart James Gemmill	Independent
2015	Julie Flatman	Conservative
2023	Anders Linder	Conservative

== 2011 Results ==
Candidate name:	Party name:	Votes:	% of votes:
Gemmill, Stuart James	Independent	752	72.24
Hargrave, James Edward	Liberal Democrat	289	27.76

== 2015 Results ==
The turnout of the election was 74.67%.

Candidate name:	Party name:	Votes:	% of votes:
Julie FLATMAN	Conservative	1083	70.01
James HARGRAVE	Green	464	29.99

== 2023 Results ==
Candidate name:	Party name:	Votes:	% of votes:
Anders LINDER	Conservative	441	46.86
Gemma WHITEHOUSE	Green	263	27.94
Paul THEAKER	Labour	155	16.47
James FAWCETT	Liberal Democrats	82	8.71

== See also ==
- Mid Suffolk local elections
