= Elmswell and Norton Ward =

Electoral ward of Mid Suffolk, England

The candidate information for the Elmswell and Norton Ward in Mid-Suffolk, Suffolk, England. This ward has elected two councillors.

== Councillors ==
Election	Member	Party	Member	Party
2011	Jane Storey	Conservative	Sarah Mansel	Green
2015	John Levantis	Conservative	Sarah Mansel	Green

== 2011 Results ==
Candidate name:	Party:	Votes:	% of votes:
Storey, Jane	Conservative	991	32.53
Mansel, Sarah	Green	657	21.57
Milward, Carol	Liberal Democrat	615	20.19
Cunningham, Julian	Liberal Democrat	492	16.15
Salmon, Heather	Labour	291	9.55

== 2015 Results ==
The turnout of the election was 71.09%.

Candidate name:	Party name:	Votes:	% of votes:
John LEVANTIS	Conservative	1619	34.44
Sarah MANSEL	Green	1003	21.34
Doug REED	Liberal Democrat	908	19.32
Howard JONES	UKIP	750	15.95
Sylvie WARRY	Green	421	8.96

== See also ==
- Mid Suffolk local elections
