= Hoxne Ward =

Electoral ward of Mid Suffolk, England

The candidate information for the Hoxne & Worlingworth Ward in Mid-Suffolk, Suffolk, England.

== Councillors ==
Election	Member	Party
2011	Liz Gibson-Harries	Conservative
2015	Liz Gibson-Harries	Conservative

== 2011 Results ==
Candidate name:	Party name:	Votes:	% of votes:
Gibson-Harries, Liz	Conservative	594	64.01
Edwards, Lorraine	Liberal Democrat	175	18.86
Hinchcliffe, Geoff	Labour	159	17.13

== 2015 Results ==
The turnout of the election was 76.50%.

Candidate name:	Party name:	Votes:	% of votes:
Liz GIBSON-HARRIES	Conservative	839	64.34
Nicola CARR	Labour	400	30.67
Tommy GEE	Green	65	4.98

== 2023 Results ==
Candidate name:	Party name:	Votes:	% of votes:
Matthew HICKS	Conservative	509	51.67
Charlie MEYER	Green	287	29.13
Steve CARD	Liberal Democrat	97	9.84
Stephen NIXON	Labour	92	9.34

== See also ==
- Mid Suffolk local elections
