= Peter Prinsley =

British politician (born 1958)

Peter Prinsley MP FRCSE FRCS
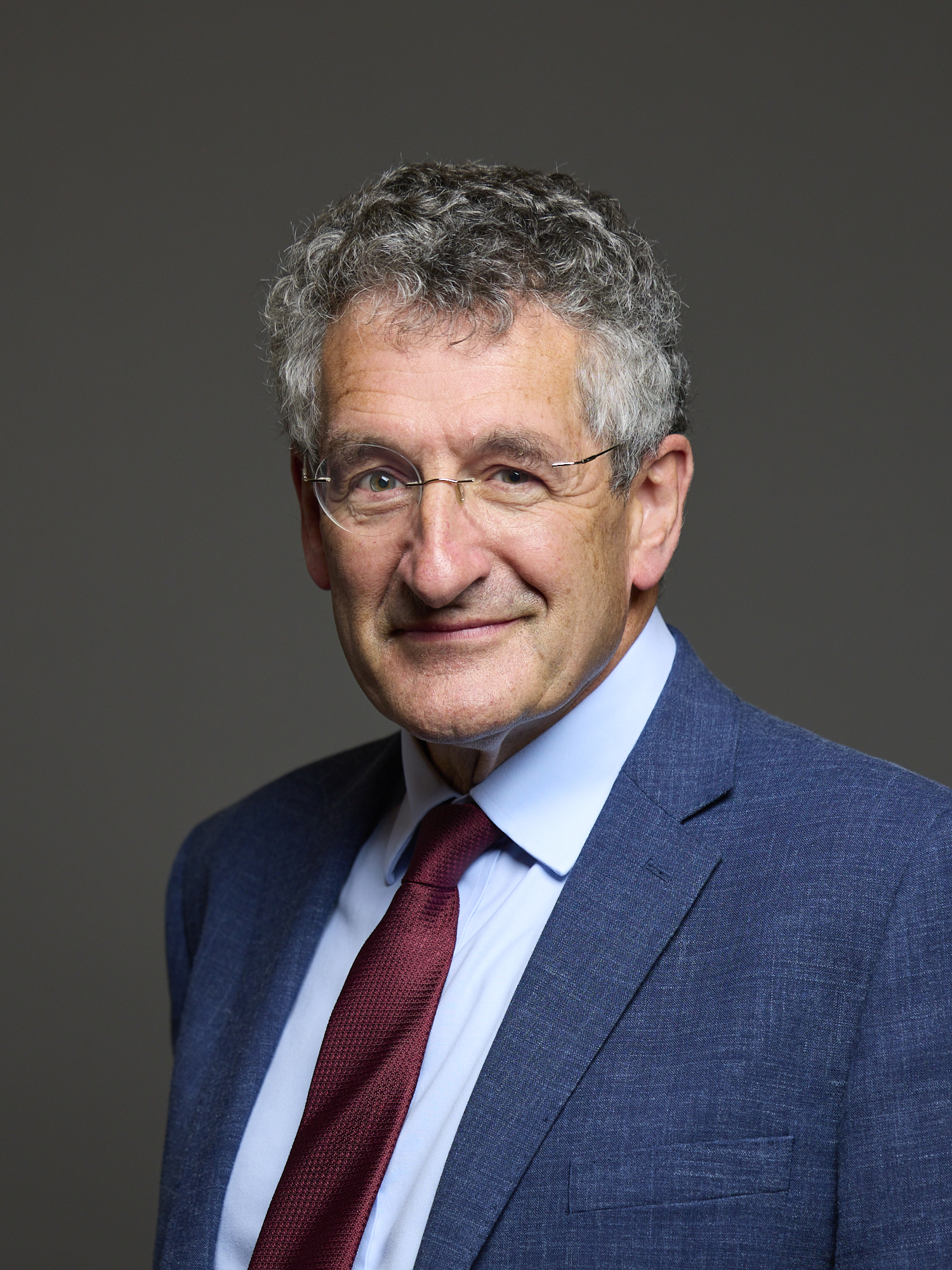
- Official portrait, 2024

Member of Parliament for Bury St Edmunds and Stowmarket
- Incumbent
- Assumed office 4 July 2024
- Preceded by: Constituency established
- Majority: 1,452 (2.85%)

Personal details
- Born: 8 April 1958 (age 68) Ilkley, West Riding of Yorkshire, England
- Party: Labour
- Relatives: George Jeger (uncle); Santo Jeger (uncle); Lena Jeger (aunt)
- Website: peterprinsley.org

Peter Richard Prinsley (born 8 April 1958) is a British Labour Party politician, who was elected as Member of Parliament for Bury St Edmunds and Stowmarket in the general election held on 4 July 2024.

== Early life and education ==
Prinsley was born on 8 April 1958 in Ilkley, Yorkshire, England. He was educated at Guisborough Grammar School, a grammar school in Guisborough.

== Career ==
Prinsley is an otorhinolaryngologist by profession (a surgeon specialising in diseases of the ear, nose, and throat). He was educated at Sheffield Medical School. Before being elected to Parliament, he worked as a consultant ENT surgeon at the Norfolk & Norwich Hospital, James Paget University Hospital and in private practice. He has an interest in Otology and taught at Norwich Medical School.

After working as a consultant surgeon for 20 years, Prinsley studied for a Doctor of Medicine degree at the University of East Anglia. He has published on a variety of academic topics with a particular focus on cholesteatoma. After becoming an MP, Prinsley co-authored a study entitled "Epidemiology of Cholesteatoma in the UK Biobank", published in Clinical Otolaryngology.

Prinsley has been a regional director for the Royal College of Surgeons, and was the chair of the Norfolk Deaf Association.

Prinsley was elected as a Norwich City councillor in 2023. He is a member of the Jewish Labour Movement and GMB.

== Member of Parliament ==
Prinsley had sought selection as Labour candidate for both Norwich North and Great Yarmouth, but was unsuccessful. Aftet the 2024 election was called, the Labour Party told him he had been selected to fight Bury St Edmunds and Stowmarket, and his successful election was seen as a surprise win in an area that has traditionally been heavily Conservative. He defeated Conservative candidate Will Tanner, who had previously served as the Deputy Chief of Staff to Prime Minister Rishi Sunak. He campaigned in an old Post Office van, decorated with photographs of him in surgical scrubs, becoming one of the oldest first-time MPs. He has said that, regarding the jobs of surgeon and MP, 'both of these roles have their uses'.

In October 2024, Prinsley suggested that £100m spent on F-35 fighter jets for HMS Queen Elizabeth would be better spent on the BBC World Service.

He is the vice-chair of the All-party parliamentary group on Deafness, an officer for the All-Party Parliamentary Group on Vascular and Venous Disease, and a member of the All-Party Parliamentary Groups on the East of England, Health and British Sign Language.

In September 2025 he was found in breach of parliamentary rules, after failing to declare an all-expenses-paid trip to Israel. He joined a “solidarity” trip in May that was organised and funded by Labour Friends of Israel (LFI). Prinsley apologised for the late declaration, which he blamed on an “administrative error” by one of his staff members. Later that month, Prinsley and fellow MP Simon Opher were denied entry into Israel during a trip to the occupied West Bank organised by the Council for Arab-British Understanding. The pair were part of a parliamentary delegation observing medical and humanitarian work being undertaken by Medical Aid for Palestinians and other organisations. The British Foreign Office described the denial as "totally unacceptable and deeply concerning".

== Personal life ==
He is Jewish and attends Norwich Synagogue. His wife, Dr Marian Prinsley, is a retired psychologist and former president of the Norwich Hebrew Congregation who became the Sheriff of Norwich in 2019. Mr Prinsley's brother-in-law is John Schlapobersky, a group psychotherapist and anti-apartheid activist who was a Founding Trustee of the Medical Foundation for the Care of Victims of Torture. The Prinsleys have three adult children and are grandparents.

Parliament of the United Kingdom
New title	Member of Parliament for Bury St Edmunds and Stowmarket; 2024–present	Incumbent
