= Fressingfield Ward =

Electoral ward in Suffolk, England

The candidate information for the Fressingfield Ward in Mid-Suffolk, Suffolk, England.

== Councillors ==
Election	Member	Party
2011	Marilyn Currna	Conservative
2015	Lavnia Hadingham	Conservative

== 2011 Results ==
Candidate name:	Party name:	Votes:	% of votes:
Currna, Marilyn	Conservative	575	58.55
Aalders-Dunthorne, Andrew	Liberal Democrat	230	23.42
Deeks, Garry	Labour	177	18.02

== 2015 Results ==
The turnout of the election was 75.48%.

Candidate name:	Party name:	Votes:	% of votes:
Lavnia HADINGHAM	Conservative Party	885	60.70
Garry DEEKS	Labour	304	20.85
Andrew AALDERS-DUNTHORNE	Green	269	18.45

== See also ==
- Mid Suffolk local elections
