= Badwell Ash Ward =

Electoral ward of Mid Suffolk, England

The candidate information for the Badwell Ash Ward in Mid-Suffolk, Suffolk, England.

== Councillors ==
Election	Member	Party
2011	Roy Barker	Conservative
2015	Roy Barker	Conservative

== 2011 Results ==
Candidate name:	Party:	Votes:	% of votes:
Barker, Roy	Conservative	779	69.99
Mellen, Andrew	Green	183	16.44
Gath, Any	Liberal Democrat	89	8.00
Fairweather, Thomas	UK Independence Party	62	5.57

== 2015 Results ==
The turnout of the election was 74.35%.

Candidate name:	Party name:	Votes:	% of votes:
Roy BARKER	Conservative	1071	67.36
Andy MELLEN	Green	382	24.03
Ann GATH	Liberal Democrat	137	8.62

== See also ==
- Mid Suffolk local elections
