= Onehouse Ward =

Electoral ward in Suffolk, England

The candidate information for the Onehouse Ward in Mid-Suffolk, Suffolk, England.

== Councillors ==
Election	Member	Party
2011	John Matthissen	Green
2015	John Matthissen	Green

== 2011 Results ==
Candidate name:	Party:	Votes:	% of votes:
Matthissen, John	Green	539	56.32
Carlton-Walker, Stephen	Conservative	312	32.60
Turner, Nicky	Liberal Democrat	106	11.08

== 2015 Results ==
The turnout of the election was 70.75%.

Candidate name:	Party name:	Votes:	% of votes:
John MATTHISSEN	Green	734	56.16
Andrew BILLINGE	UKIP	343	26.24
Julian CUNNINGHAM	Liberal Democrat	230	17.60

== See also ==
- Mid Suffolk local elections
