= St John's Ward, Ipswich =

Ward in Ipswich

St John's
- ward for Ipswich Council
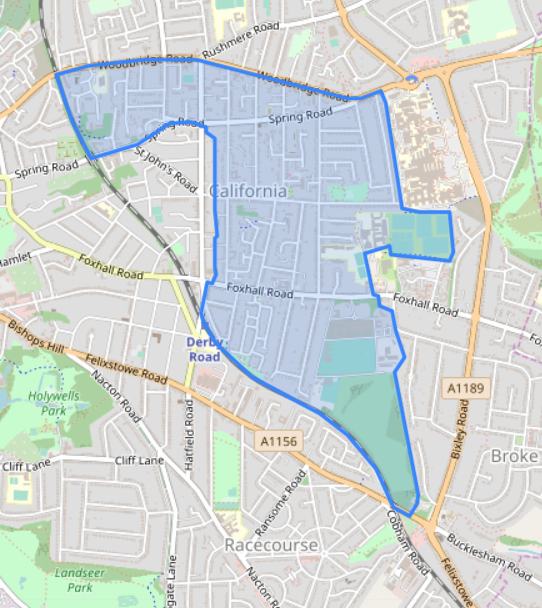
- Boundary of St John's in Ipswich from 2019.
- Local government in East of England: Suffolk

Current ward
- Created: 2002
- Councillor: Neil McDonald (Labour)
- Councillor: Elango Elavalakan (Labour)
- Councillor: Michelle Darwin (Labour)

St John's Ward is a ward in the North East Area of Ipswich, Suffolk, England. It returns three councillors to Ipswich Borough Council.

It is designated Middle Layer Super Output Area Ipswich 008 by the Office for National Statistics. It is composed of 6 Lower Layer Super Output Areas.

== Notable buildings in St John's Ward ==
- St Clement's Hospital, Ipswich, a former mental hospital closed in 2002.
