= Rattlesden Ward =

Electoral ward in Mid Suffolk, England

The candidate information for the Rattlesden Ward in Mid-Suffolk, Suffolk, England.

== Councillors ==
Election	Member	Party
2011	Penny Otton	Liberal Democrats
2015	Penny Otton	Liberal Democrats

== 2011 Results ==
Candidate name:	Party:	Votes:	% of votes:
Otton, Penny	Liberal Democrat	604	64.32
Clayden, Adrian	Conservative	335	35.68

== 2015 Results ==
The turnout of the election was 74.56%.

Candidate name:	Party name:	Votes:	% of votes:
Penny OTTON	Liberal Democrat	728	58.57
Gilly MORGAN	Conservative	515	41.43

== See also ==
- Mid Suffolk local elections
