= Woolpit Ward =

Former ward of Mid Suffolk district in Suffolk, England, UK

Woolpit was an electoral ward of Mid-Suffolk district, in Suffolk, England, named after the village of Woolpit. The ward was abolished in 2019 when new wards were formed throughout the district; Woolpit village became part of Elmswell & Woolpit Ward.

== Councillors ==
Election	Member	Party
2011	Ray Melvin	Independent
2015	Jane Storey	Conservative

== 2011 Results ==
Candidate name:	Party:	Votes:	% of votes:
Melvin, Ray	Independent	468	57.07
Scotford, David	Green	204	24.88
Broadway, Judith	Liberal Democrat	79	9.63
Salmon, Barry	Labour	69	8.41

== 2015 Results ==
The turnout of the election was 73.80%.

Candidate name:	Party name:	Votes:	% of votes:
Jane STOREY	Conservative	743	61.87
Claire SCOTFORD	Green	458	38.13

== See also ==
- Mid Suffolk local elections
