= Gipping Ward, Ipswich =

Ward in Ipswich

Gipping
- ward for Ipswich Council
- Local government in East of England: Suffolk
- Electorate: 6472

Current ward
- Created: 2002
- Councillor: Elizabeth Hughes (Labour)
- Councillor: David Ellesmere (Labour)
- Councillor: Peter Gardiner (Labour)

Gipping Ward is a ward in the South West Area of Ipswich, Suffolk, England. It returns three councillors to Ipswich Borough Council.

It is designated Middle Layer Super Output Area Ipswich 010 by the Office for National Statistics. It is composed of 5 Lower Layer Super Output Areas.

== Councillors ==
The following councillors were elected since the boundaries were changed in 2002 Names in brackets indicates that the councillor remained in office without re-election.

| Date | Councillor | Councillor | Councillor |
|---|---|---|---|
| May 2002 | Jeanette Macartney | David Ellesmere | Peter Gardiner |
| May 2003 | (Jeanette Macartney) | (David Ellesmere) | Peter Gardiner |
| June 2004 | (Jeanette Macartney) | David Ellesmere | (Peter Gardiner) |
| May 2006 | Jeanette Macartney | (David Ellesmere) | (Peter Gardiner) |
| May 2007 | (Jeanette Macartney) | (David Ellesmere) | Peter Gardiner |
| May 2008 | (Jeanette Macartney) | David Ellesmere | (Peter Gardiner) |
| May 2010 | Jeanette Macartney | (David Ellesmere) | (Peter Gardiner) |
| May 2011 | (Jeanette Macartney) | (David Ellesmere) | Peter Gardiner |
| May 2012 | (Jeanette Macartney) | David Ellesmere | (Peter Gardiner) |
| May 2014 | Jeanette Macartney | (David Ellesmere) | Peter Gardiner |
| May 2015 | Jeanette Macartney | (David Ellesmere) | Peter Gardiner |
| May 2016 | (Jeannette MacArtney) | David Ellesmere | (Peter Gardiner) |
| May 2018 | Elizabeth Hughes | (David Ellesmere) | (Peter Gardiner) |
| May 2019 | (Elizabeth Hughes) | (David Ellesmere) | Peter Gardiner |
| May 2021 | (Elizabeth Hughes) | David Ellesmere | (Peter Gardiner) |
| May 2022 | Elizabeth Hughes | (David Ellesmere) | (Peter Gardiner) |
| May 2023 | (Elizabeth Hughes) | (David Ellesmere) | Peter Gardiner |
| May 2024 | (Elizabeth Hughes) | David Ellesmere | (Peter Gardiner) |
