= Rushmere Ward, Ipswich =

Ward in Ipswich

Rushmere
- ward for Ipswich Council
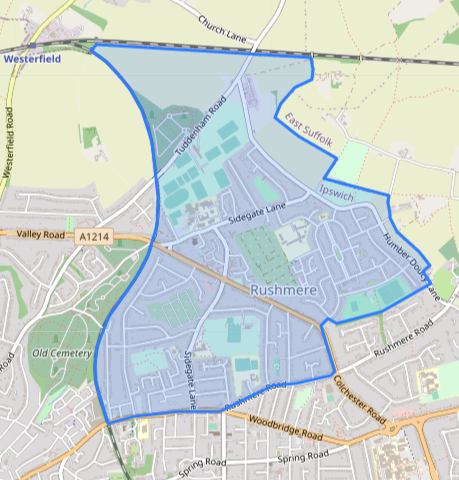
- Boundary of Rushmere in Ipswich from 2019.
- Local government in East of England: Suffolk

Current ward
- Created: 2002
- Councillor: Alasdair Ross (Labour)
- Councillor: Stefan Long (Labour)
- Councillor: Kelvin Cracknell (Labour)

Rushmere Ward is a ward in the North East Area of Ipswich, Suffolk, England. It returns three councillors to Ipswich Borough Council.

It is designated Middle Layer Super Output Area Ipswich 004 by the Office for National Statistics. It is composed of 5 Lower Layer Super Output Areas.

== Ward profile, 2008 ==
Rushmere Ward is located on the north-eastern edge of Ipswich. In 2005 it had a population of about 8,000. The ward has a low proportion of 16-29 year olds and a high proportion of single person pensioner households.

== Councillors ==
The following councillors were elected since the boundaries were changed in 2002. Names in brackets indicates that the councillor remained in office without re-election.

Date	Councillor	Councillor	Councillor
May 2002	Robert Ray-Dobson	Keith Herod	David Isaacs
May 2003	(Robert Ray-Dobson)	(Keith Herod)	Eileen Smith
June 2004	Stephen Ion	Judy Terry	(Eileen Smith)
May 2006	(Stephen Ion)	Denise Terry	(Eileen Smith)
May 2007	(Stephen Ion)	(Denise Terry)	Eileen Smith
May 2008	Alasdair Ross	(Denise Terry)	(Eileen Smith)
May 2010	(Alasdair Ross)	Denise Terry	(Eileen Smith)
May 2011	(Alasdair Ross)	(Denise Terry)	Tracy Grant
May 2012	Alasdair Ross	(Denise Terry)	(Tracy Grant)
May 2014	(Alasdair Ross)	Sandra Gage	(Tracy Grant)
May 2015|	(Alasdair Ross)	(Sandra Gage)	Stephen Ion
May 2016	Alasdair Ross	(Sandra Gage)	(Stephen Ion)
May 2018	(Alasdair Ross)	Sandra Gage	(Stephen Ion)
May 2019	(Alasdair Ross)	(Sandra Gage)	Kelvin Cracknell
May 2021	Alasdair Ross	(Sandra Gage)	(Kelvin Cracknell)
May 2022	(Alasdair Ross)	Stefan Long	(Kelvin Cracknell)
