= Alexandra Ward, Ipswich =

Ward in Ipswich

Alexandra
- ward for Ipswich Council
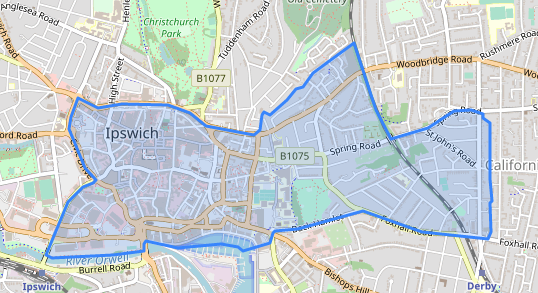
- Boundary of Alexandra in Ipswich from 2019.
- Local government in East of England: Suffolk
- Electorate: 7780

Current ward
- Created: 2002
- Councillor: Adam Rae (Labour)
- Councillor: John Cook (Labour)
- Councillor: Jane Riley (Labour)

Alexandra Ward is a ward in the central area of Ipswich, Suffolk, England. It returns three councillors to Ipswich Borough Council.

It is designated Middle Layer Super Output Area Ipswich 007 by the Office for National Statistics. It is composed of 6 Lower Layer Super Output Areas.

== Ward profile, 2008 ==
Alexandra Ward is located in Ipswich town centre. In 2005 it had a population a little under 7,500. A high proportion of its residents living alone and it also has a high proportion of younger people.

== Notable buildings in Alexandra Ward ==
- Neptune Inn, Fore Street

=== Churches ===
- St Clement's Church
- St Lawrence Church
- St Mary at the Elms

== Councillors ==
The following councillors were elected since the boundaries were changed in 2002 Names in brackets indicates that the councillor remained in office without re-election.

| Date | Councillor | Councillor | Councillor |
|---|---|---|---|
| May 2002 | Penelope Breakwell | Maureen Carrington-Brown | Jane Chambers |
| May 2003 | (Penelope Breakwell) | (Maureen Carrington-Brown) | Jane Chambers |
| June 2004 | (Penelope Breakwell) | Louise Gooch | (Jane Chambers) |
| May 2006 | Phillip Green | (Louise Gooch) | (Jane Chambers) |
| May 2007 | (Phillip Green) | (Louise Gooch) | Jane Chambers |
| May 2008 | (Phillip Green) | Louise Gooch | (Jane Chambers) |
| May 2010 | Ken Bates | Nigel Cheeseman | (Jane Chambers) |
| May 2011 | (Ken Bates) | (Nigel Cheeseman) | Harvey Crane |
| May 2012 | (Ken Bates) | Adam James Leeder | (Harvey Crane) |
| May 2014 | John Cook | (Adam James Leeder) | Jane Riley |
| May 2015 | (John Cook) | (Adam James Leeder) | Jane Riley |
| May 2016 | (John Cook) | Adam James Leeder | (Jane Riley) |
| May 2018 | John Cook | (Adam James Leeder) | (Jane Riley) |
| May 2019 | (John Cook) | (Adam James Leeder) | Jane Riley |
| Sept 2019 | (John Cook) | (Adam Rae) | Jane Riley |
| May 2021 | (John Cook) | Adam Rae | (Jane Riley) |
| May 2022 | John Cook | (Adam Rae) | (Jane Riley) |
| May 2023 | (John Cook) | (Adam Rae) | Jane Riley |
| May 2024 | (John Cook) | Adam Rae | (Jane Riley) |
