= 2012 Ipswich Borough Council election =

2012 UK local government election

← 2011	3 May 2012	2014 →

16 of 48 seats up for election 25 seats needed for a majority
	First party	Second party	Third party
Party	Labour	Conservative	Liberal Democrats
Last election	28	16	4
Seats won	12	4	1
Seats after	32	12	4
Seat change	▲4	▼3	▼3
Popular vote	14,623	8,984	2,996
Percentage	51.9%	31.9%	10.6%
- Map showing the 2012 local election results in Ipswich.
Council control before election
Labour
Council control after election
Labour

The 2012 Ipswich Council election took place on 3 May 2012 to elect members of Ipswich Council in England. This was on the same day as other 2012 United Kingdom local elections. Ipswich Borough Council has 48 councillors who are elected for a term of four years. The councillors are elected in 'thirds' with one councillor in each of the 16 wards retiring each year for three out of four years. Every fourth year there is a break from the borough council elections and elections for county councillors are held instead. Ipswich Borough Council is also responsible for the administration of UK Parliamentary general elections, formerly European Parliamentary elections and national and local referendums.

== Ward results ==
=== Alexandra ===
Alexandra
Party	Candidate	Votes	%
Labour Co-op	Adam James Leeder	1,005	54.0
Liberal Democrats	Catherine Chambers	349	18.7
Conservative	Steve Flood	311	16.7
Green	Jamie Lawrence	197	10.6
Majority		656	35.3
Rejected ballots		11	
Total votes		1,873	
Turnout			29

=== Bixley ===
Bixley (vote for 2)
Party	Candidate	Votes	%
Conservative	John Carnall	902	48.3
Conservative	Richard Pope	855	45.8
Labour	John Cook	562	30.1
Labour	Sandra Gage	517	27.7
Green	Barry Broom	299	16.0
Green	Catherine Struthers	198	10.6
Liberal Democrats	Peter Bagnall	183	9.8
Rejected ballots		8	
Total votes		1,876	
Turnout			33

=== Bridge ===
Bridge
Party	Candidate	Votes	%
Labour Co-op	Bryony Rudkin	853	57.6
Conservative	James Spencer	375	25.3
Green	Kathie Jones	161	10.9
Liberal Democrats	Juliet Groves	91	6.1
Majority		478	32.3
Rejected ballots		0	
Total votes		1,480	
Turnout			23

=== Castle Hill ===
Castle Hill
Party	Candidate	Votes	%
Conservative	Robin Vickery	888	51.2
Labour	John Harris	674	38.8
Liberal Democrats	Gareth Jones	174	10.0
Majority		214	12.4
Rejected ballots		13	
Total votes		1,749	
Turnout			30

=== Gainsborough ===
Gainsborough
Party	Candidate	Votes	%
Labour	John Mowles	1,094	69.4
Conservative	Carol Debman	405	25.7
Liberal Democrats	Nicholas Jacob	78	4.9
Majority		689	43.7
Rejected ballots		9	
Total votes		1,586	
Turnout			25

=== Gipping ===
Gipping
Party	Candidate	Votes	%
Labour	David Ellesmere	950	67.3
Conservative	Kevin Algar	329	23.3
Liberal Democrats	Stuart McHardy	132	9.4
Majority		621	44.0
Rejected ballots		16	
Total votes		1,427	
Turnout			23

=== Holywells ===
Holywells ward
Party	Candidate	Votes	%
Conservative	Pam Stewart	757	42.1
Labour	Elango Elavalakan	708	39.4
Green	Thomas Wilmot	178	9.9
Liberal Democrats	Robert Chambers	154	8.6
Majority		49	2.7
Rejected ballots		10	
Total votes		1,807	
Turnout			30

=== Priory Heath ===
Priory Heath ward
Party	Candidate	Votes	%
Labour	William Quinton	1,047	63.4
Conservative	Mark Felix-Thomas	375	22.7
Green	Fraser John Florence	119	7.2
Liberal Democrats	Mathew Baker	107	6.5
Majority		672	40.7
Rejected ballots		11	
Total votes		1,663	
Turnout			26

=== Rushmere Ward ===
Rushmere
Party	Candidate	Votes	%
Labour	Alasdair Ross	1,293	57.1
Conservative	Christopher Chambers	746	32.9
Green	Eric Nelson	138	6.1
Liberal Democrats	Robin Whitmore	89	3.9
Majority		547	24.2
Rejected ballots		8	
Total votes		2,274	
Turnout			37

Sprites ward
Party	Candidate	Votes	%
Labour	Richard Kirby	1,056	66.0
Conservative	Duncan Titchmarsh	441	27.6
Liberal Democrats	Julie Fletcher	103	6.4
Majority		615	38.4
Rejected ballots		7	
Total votes		1,607	
Turnout			30

St. John's ward
Party	Candidate	Votes	%
Labour	Jennifer Stimson	1,320	62.4
Conservative	Edward Phillips	673	31.8
Liberal Democrats	Kevin Lock	124	5.9
Majority		647	30.6
Rejected ballots		19	
Total votes		2,136	
Turnout			32

St. Margaret's ward
Party	Candidate	Votes	%
Liberal Democrats	Andrew Cann	883	36.6
Conservative	Stephen Ion	786	32.6
Labour	Scott Huntly	489	20.3
Independent	Peter Turtill	128	5.3
Green	Kirsty Wilmot	124	5.1
Majority		97	4.0
Rejected ballots		4	
Total votes		2,414	
Turnout			40

Stoke Park ward
Party	Candidate	Votes	%
Labour	Glen Chisholm	894	52.6
Conservative	Bob Hall	643	37.8
Green	Roy Adams	90	5.3
Liberal Democrats	Rebecca Robinson	73	4.3
Majority		251	14.8
Rejected ballots		6	
Total votes		1,706	
Turnout			31

Westgate ward
Party	Candidate	Votes	%
Labour Co-op	Carole Jones	917	57.7
Conservative	Lee Reynolds	322	20.3
Liberal Democrats	Timothy Lockington	218	13.7
Green	John Mann	131	8.2
Majority		595	37.4
Rejected ballots		6	
Total votes		1,594	
Turnout			24

Whitehouse ward
Party	Candidate	Votes	%
Labour	Albert Grant	789	61.6
Conservative	Neil Harrison	356	27.8
Liberal Democrats	Emma Sharman	136	10.6
Majority		433	33.8
Rejected ballots		9	
Total votes		1,290	
Turnout			20

Whitton ward
Party	Candidate	Votes	%
Labour	Sophie Meudec	972	55.6
Conservative	Sandie Doyle	675	38.6
Liberal Democrats	Ken Toye	102	5.8
Majority		297	17.0
Rejected ballots		11	
Total votes		1,760	
Turnout			30
