= Bixley Ward, Ipswich =

Ward in Ipswich

Bixley
- ward for Ipswich Council
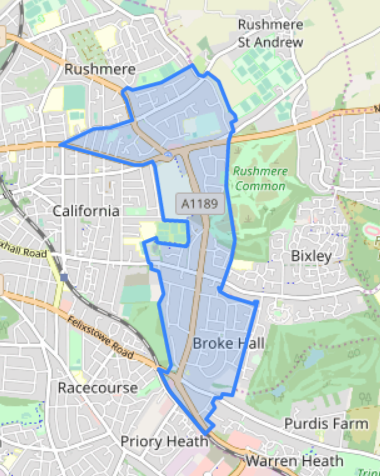
- Boundary of Bixley in Ipswich from 2019.
- Local government in East of England: Suffolk

Current ward
- Created: 2002
- Councillor: Lee Reynolds (Conservative)
- Councillor: Edward Phillips (Conservative)
- Councillor: Richard Pope (Conservative)

Bixley Ward is a ward in the north east area of Ipswich, Suffolk, England. It returns three councillors to Ipswich Borough Council.

It is designated Middle Layer Super Output Area Ipswich 009 by the Office for National Statistics. It is composed of 5 Lower Layer Super Output Areas.

== Ward profile, 2008 ==
Bixley Ward is located on the eastern edge of Ipswich. In 2005 it had a population of about 7,100. A high proportion of its residents living alone and it also had a high proportion of older people and of single person pensioner households.

== Councillors ==
The following councillors were elected since the boundaries were changed in 2002 Names in brackets indicates that the councillor remained in office without re-election.

Date	Councillor	Councillor	Councillor
May 2002	William Wright	Gordon Terry	Stephen Barker
May 2003	(William Wright)	(Gordon Terry)	Stephen Barker
June 2004	(William Wright)	Paul Carter	(Stephen Barker)
May 2006	William Wright	(Paul Carter)	(Stephen Barker)
May 2007	(William Wright)	(Paul Carter)	Gavin Maclure
May 2008	John Carnall	Russell Harsant	(Gavin Maclure)
May 2010	(John Carnall)	Russell Harsant	(Gavin Maclure)
May 2011	(John Carnall)	(Russell Harsant)	Kym Stroet
May 2012	John Carnall	Richard Pope	(Kym Stroet)
May 2014	(John Carnall)	Edward Phillips	(Kym Stroet)
May 2015	(John Carnall)	(Edward Phillips)	Richard Pope
May 2016	John Carnall	(Edward Phillips)	(Richard Pope)
May 2018	(John Carnall)	Edward Phillips	(Richard Pope)
May 2019	(John Carnall)	(Edward Phillips)	Richard Pope
May 2021	Lee Reynolds	(Edward Phillips)	(Richard Pope)
May 2022	(Lee Reynolds)	Edward Phillips	(Richard Pope)
May 2023	(Lee Reynolds)	(Edward Phillips)	Richard Pope
May 2024	Lee Reynolds	(Edward Phillips)	(Richard Pope)

=== Prior to 2002 ===
Date	Councillor	Councillor	Councillor
May 1998	(William Wright)	J. Shorten	Stephen Barker
May 1999	William Wright	Gordon Terry	(Stephen Barker)
May 2000	(William Wright)	Gordon Terry	(Stephen Barker)
