= Gainsborough Ward, Ipswich =

Ward in Ipswich

Gainsborough
- ward for Ipswich Council
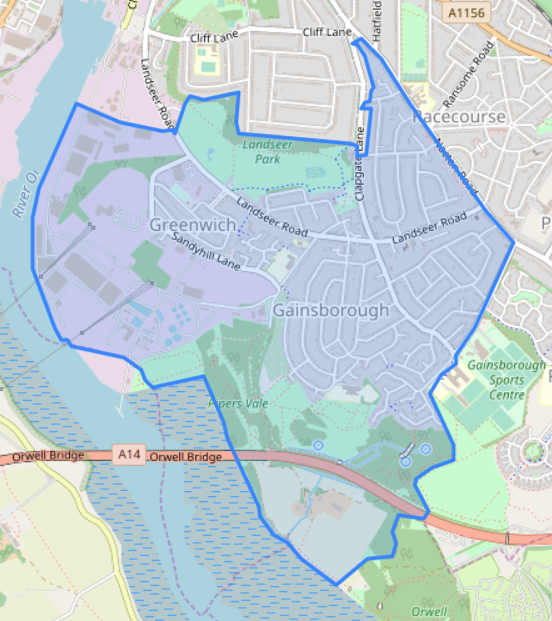
- Boundary of Gainsborough in Ipswich from 2019.
- Local government in East of England: Suffolk

Current ward
- Created: 2002
- Councillor: James Whatling (Labour)
- Councillor: Lynne Mortimer (Labour)
- Councillor: Martin Cook (Labour)

Gainsborough Ward is a ward in the South East Area of Ipswich, Suffolk, England. It returns three councillors to Ipswich Borough Council.

It is designated Middle Layer Super Output Area Ipswich 016 by the Office for National Statistics. It is composed of 6 Lower Layer Super Output Areas.

The ward includes:

- Gainsborough
- Greenwich
- Landseer Park

== Councillors ==
The following councillors were elected since the boundaries were changed in 2002. Names in brackets indicates that the councillor remained in office without re-election.

Date	Councillor	Councillor	Councillor
May 2002	Sally Brown	John Mowles	Don Edwards
May 2003	(Sally Brown)	(John Mowles)	Don Edwards
June 2004	(Sally Brown)	John Mowles	(Don Edwards)
May 2006	June Brown	(John Mowles)	(Don Edwards)
May 2007	(June Brown)	(John Mowles)	Don Edwards
May 2008	Martin Cook	John Mowles	(Don Edwards)
May 2010	(Martin Cook)	(John Mowles)	Keith Rawlingson
May 2011	Martin Cook	(John Mowles)	(Keith Rawlingson)
May 2012	(Martin Cook)	John Mowles	(Keith Rawlingson)
May 2014	(Martin Cook)	(John Mowles)	Andi Hopgood
May 2015|	Martin Cook	(John Mowles)	(Andi Hopgood)
May 2016	(Martin Cook)	Stephen Connelly	(Andi Hopgood)
May 2018	(Martin Cook)	(Stephen Connelly)	Sheila Handley
May 2019	Martin Cook	(Stephen Connelly)	(Sheila Handley)
May 2021	(Martin Cook)	Shayne Pooley	(Sheila Handley)
May 2022	(Martin Cook)	(Shayne Pooley)	Lynne Mortimer
May 2023	(Martin Cook)	(Shayne Pooley)	(Lynne Mortimer)
May 2024	Martin Cook	James Whatling	(Lynne Mortimer)
