= Castle Hill Ward, Ipswich =

Ward in Ipswich, Suffolk, England

Castle Hill
- ward for Ipswich Council
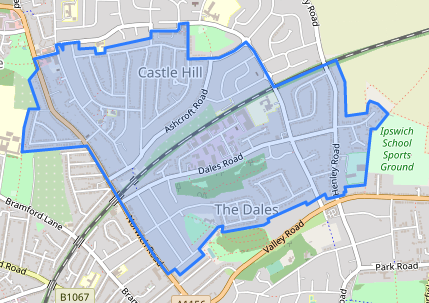
- Boundary of Castle Hill in Ipswich from 2019.
- Local government in East of England: Suffolk
- Electorate: 5756

Current ward
- Created: 2002
- Councillor: Ian Fisher (Conservative)
- Councillor: Sam Murray (Conservative)
- Councillor: Erion Xhaferaj (Conservative)

Castle Hill Ward is a ward in the North West Area of Ipswich, Suffolk, England. It returns three councillors to Ipswich Borough Council and its designated Middle Layer Super Output Area Ipswich 002 by the Office for National Statistics. It is composed of 5 Lower Layer Super Output Areas.

Robin Vickery, one of the Conservative Borough Councillors resigned on 8 June 2020 following over 20 complaints made concerning racist posts he had shared on Facebook. He resigned before a Council investigation could be put in place, also resigning as Suffolk County councillor for Carlford Division, Suffolk and from the Conservative Party. Ipswich Borough Council stated that in light of the COVID-19 pandemic, the seat would not be contested until May 2021.

== Ward profile, 2008 ==
Castle Hill Ward is located to the north of central Ipswich. In 2005 it had a population of about 7,500. It has the lowest proportion of its residents living alone in Ipswich and has more than average older residents.

== Councillors ==
The following councillors were elected since the boundaries were changed in 2002. Names in brackets indicates that the councillor remained in office without re-election.

Date	Councillor	Councillor	Councillor
May 2002	Henry Davies	Dale Jackson	David Goldsmith
May 2003	(Henry Davies)	(Dale Jackson)	David Goldsmith
June 2004	(Henry Davies)	Dale Jackson	(David Goldsmith)
May 2006	Henry Davies	(Dale Jackson)	(David Goldsmith)
May 2007	(Henry Davies)	(Dale Jackson)	David Goldsmith
May 2008	(Henry Davies)	Robin Vickery	(David Goldsmith)
May 2010	Mary Young	(Robin Vickery)	(David Goldsmith)
May 2011	(Mary Young)	(Robin Vickery)	David Goldsmith
May 2012	(Mary Young)	Robin Vickery	(David Goldsmith)
May 2014	Christopher Stewart	(Robin Vickery)	(David Goldsmith)
May 2015|	(Christopher Stewart)	(Robin Vickery)	David Goldsmith
May 2016	Ian Fisher	Robin Vickery	(David Goldsmith)
May 2018	(Ian Fisher)	Robin Vickery	(David Goldsmith)
May 2019	(Ian Fisher)	(Robin Vickery)*	Erion Xhaferaj
May 2021	Ian Fisher	Sam Murray	(Erion Xhaferaj)
May 2022	(Ian Fisher)	Sam Murray	(Erion Xhaferaj)
May 2023	(Ian Fisher)	(Sam Murray)	Erion Xhaferaj
May 2024	Ian Fisher	(Sam Murray)	(Erion Xhaferaj)
