= 2015 Ipswich Borough Council election =

2015 UK local government election

← 2014	7 May 2015	2016 →

18 seats (out of 48 seats) 25 seats needed for a majority
	First party	Second party	Third party
Party	Labour	Conservative	Liberal Democrats
Seats before	35	10	3
Seats won	10	8	0
Seats after	31	15	2
Seat change	▼4	▲5	▼1
Popular vote	24,615	25,792	4,345
Percentage	37.5%	39.0%	6.6%
Swing	▼1.9%	▲11.6%	▼1.6%
- Map showing the 2015 local election results in Ipswich.
Council control before election
Labour
Council control after election
Labour

Elections to Ipswich Borough Council were held on 7 May 2015. Despite losing 4 seats to the Conservatives, the Labour Party remained the largest party on the council, albeit with a reduced majority. The Conservatives won 5 additional seats (4 from Labour and 1 from the Liberal Democrats) and polled more votes than Labour overall. The Liberal Democrats lost a seat and won no seats. UKIP and the Green Party won no seats.

== Results summary ==
Party	Votes	%	Seats			
Party	Votes	%	Won	Existing	Total	+/–
Conservative Party	25,717	38.88	8	7	15	+5
Labour Party	24,625	37.23	10	21	31	–4
UK Independence Party	7,413	11.21	0	0	0	0
Liberal Democrats	4,345	6.57	0	2	2	–1
Green Party	3,918	5.92	0	0	0	0
Suffolk Together	123	0.19	0	0	0	0
Total	66,141	100.00	18	30	48	0
Source: Ipswich Borough Council

== Ward results ==
=== Alexandra ===
Alexandra
Party	Candidate	Votes	%	±%
Labour	Jane Riley	1,805	45.4	−3.2
Conservative	Jose Bernardo Esteves	1,327	33.4	+14.2
Green	Barry Broom	534	13.4	+3.2
Liberal Democrats	Kenneth Toye	311	7.8	−2.6
Majority		478	12.0	
Turnout		3,977		
Labour hold		Swing		

=== Bixley ===
Bixley
Party	Candidate	Votes	%	±%
Conservative	Richard Pope	2,284	54.1	+6.3
Labour	Paul Anderson	1,003	23.8	+0.1
UKIP	Philippa Gordon	542	12.8	−8.3
Green	James White	206	5.9	New
Liberal Democrats	Martin Hope	183	4.3	−0.1
Majority		1,281	30.3	
Turnout		4,218		
Conservative hold		Swing		

=== Bridge ===
Bridge
Party	Candidate	Votes	%	±%
Labour	Philip Smart	1,387	39.6	−3.7
Conservative	Katherine Parkinson	1,148	32.8	+14.8
UKIP	Alan Boswell	580	16.6	−10.3
Green	Eric Nelson	205	5.9	−1.3
Liberal Democrats	Benjamin Harvey	179	5.1	+0.4
Majority		239	6.8	
Turnout		3,499		
Labour hold		Swing		

=== Castle Hill ===
Castle Hill
Party	Candidate	Votes	%	±%
Conservative	David Goldsmith	1,933	48.3	+11.1
Labour	Annabel Mednick	1,024	25.6	−2.7
UKIP	Wilfred Arasaratnam	607	15.2	−13.3
Liberal Democrats	Oliver Holmes	235	5.9	−0.1
Green	Elizabeth Smith	203	5.1	New
Majority		909	22.7	
Turnout		4,002		
Conservative hold		Swing		

=== Gainsborough ===
Gainsborough
Party	Candidate	Votes	%	±%
Labour	Martin Cook	1,520	42.2	+0.4
Conservative	Carol Debman	1,144	31.8	+11.7
UKIP	John Beard	768	21.3	−10.5
Green	Benjamin Magrath	167	4.6	−0.1
Majority		376	10.4	
Turnout		3,599		
Labour hold		Swing		

=== Gipping ===
Gipping
Party	Candidate	Votes	%	±%
Labour	Peter Gardiner	1,452	43.4	−18.7
Conservative	Kevin Algar	983	29.4	+2.5
UKIP	Colin Gould	544	16.3	New
Green	Shaun McDonald	231	6.9	New
Liberal Democrats	Stuart McHardy	135	4.0	−7.0
Majority		469	14.0	
Turnout		3,345		
Labour hold		Swing		

=== Holywells ===
Holywells
Party	Candidate	Votes	%	±%
Conservative	Elizabeth Harsant	1,649	44.7	
Labour	Howard Needham	1,132	30.7	
UKIP	Mark Dobrzanski	469	12.7	
Green	Thomas Wilmot	246	6.7	
Liberal Democrats	Timothy Lockington	194	5.3	
Majority		517	14.0	
Turnout		3,690		
Conservative hold		Swing		

=== Priory Heath ===
Priory Heath
Party	Candidate	Votes	%	±%
Labour Co-op	William Knowles	1,627	42.2	−1.8
Conservative	Andrew Shannon	1,329	34.5	+10.8
UKIP	Michael Chelk	569	14.8	−11.6
Green	Andrew Iredale	172	4.5	New
Liberal Democrats	Mathew Baker	160	4.1	−1.8
Majority		298	7.7	
Turnout		3,857		
Labour hold		Swing		

=== Rushmere ===
Rushmere
Party	Candidate	Votes	%	±%
Conservative	Stephen Ion	1,712	39.9%	
Labour Co-op	Tracy Grant	1,622	37.8%	
UKIP	Ricky Kerry	549	12.8%	
Liberal Democrats	Nicholas Jacob	212	4.9%	
Green	Maxwell Phillips	198	4.6%	
Majority		90	2.1%	
Turnout		4,293		
Conservative gain from Labour				

=== Spirtes ===
Sprites
Party	Candidate	Votes	%	±%
Labour	Roger Fern	1,412	24.1	N/A
Conservative	Robert Hall	1,205	20.6	N/A
Conservative	Michael Bailey	1,034	17.7	N/A
Labour	Colin Smart	980	16.7	N/A
UKIP	Alan Cotterell	835	14.3	N/A
Green	Maria Harrison	237	4.1	N/A
Liberal Democrats	Richard Dighton	154	2.6	N/A
Majority				
Turnout				
Labour hold		Swing		
Conservative gain from Labour		Swing		

=== St. John's ===
St. John's
Party	Candidate	Votes	%
Labour	Michelle Darwin	1,645	
Labour	Neil Macdonald	1,515	
Conservative	Mark Felix-Thomas	1,444	
Conservative	Kingsley Garratt	1,435	
UKIP	Josephine Grant	777	
Green	Edmund Harrison	502	
Liberal Democrats	Robin Whitmore	312	
Majority		71	
Turnout		7,630	
Labour hold			
Labour hold			

=== St. Margaret's ===
St. Margaret's
Party	Candidate	Votes	%	±%
Conservative	Lee Reynolds	1,743	37.5	+14.1
Liberal Democrats	Catherine French	1,521	32.8	−8.0
Labour	Steven Reynolds	1,001	21.6	+3.1
Green	Kirsty Wilmot	377	8.1	+1.9
Majority		222	4.7	
Turnout		4,642		
Conservative gain from Liberal Democrats		Swing		

=== Stoke Park ===
Stoke Park
Party	Candidate	Votes	%	±%
Conservative	Robin Hyde-Chambers	1,649	50.2	+10.3
Labour	Barry Studd	1,264	38.5	+8.3
Green	Sally Broom	227	6.9	+3.3
Liberal Democrats	Colin Boyd	146	4.4	+2.2
Majority		385	11.7	
Turnout		3,286		
Conservative gain from Labour		Swing		

=== Westgate ===
Westgate
Party	Candidate	Votes	%	±%
Labour Co-op	Julian Gibbs	1,446	42.6	+0.8
Conservative	Ray Flood	964	28.4	+5.1
UKIP	Mark Schueler	432	12.7	−5.2
Green	John Mann	252	7.4	−2.0
Liberal Democrats	Malcolm Mitchell	179	5.3	+2.4
Suffolk Together	Anna Matthews	123	3.6	New
Majority		482	14.2	
Turnout		3,396		
Labour Co-op hold		Swing		

=== Whitehouse ===
Whitehouse
Party	Candidate	Votes	%	±%
Labour Co-op	Martin Goonan	1,194	35.1	−8.5
Conservative	David Heffer	1,174	34.5	+16.8
UKIP	Eric Pearl	741	21.8	−12.5
Green	Catherine Struthers	161	4.7	New
Liberal Democrats	Moira Kleissner	133	3.9	−0.6
Majority		20	0.6	
Turnout		3,403		
Labour hold		Swing		

=== Whitton ===
Whitton
Party	Candidate	Votes	%	±%
Conservative	Erion Xhaferaj	1,640	46.5	+21.5
Labour	Stephen Connelly	1,596	45.3	+5.4
Liberal Democrats	Julie Fletcher	291	8.3	+4.3
Majority		44	1.2	
Turnout		3,527		
Conservative gain from Labour		Swing		
