= 2026 Ipswich Borough Council election =

2026 English local government election

- 7 May 2026

16 out of 48 seats to Ipswich Borough Council 25 seats needed for a majority
	First party	Second party	Third party
Leader	Neil MacDonald		Ian Fisher
Party	Labour	Reform	Conservative
Last election	38 seats, 46.6%	0 seats, 3.0%	7 seats, 29.5%
Seats before	38	0	7
Seats won	4	10	0
Seats after	29	10	5
Seat change	▼9	▲10	▼2
Popular vote	10,940	12,949	5,846
Percentage	26.8%	31.7%	14.3%
Swing	▼19.8%	▲28.7%	▼15.2%
	Fourth party	Fifth party
Party	Liberal Democrats	Green
Last election	3 seats, 9.9%	0 seats, 10.8%
Seats before	3	0
Seats won	1	1
Seats after	3	1
Seat change	Steady	▲1
Popular vote	3,370	7,772
Percentage	8.2%	19.0%
Swing	▼1.7%	▲8.2%
- Winner of each seat at the 2026 Ipswich Borough Council election.
Leader before election
Neil MacDonald
Labour
Leader after election
Neil MacDonald
Labour

The 2026 Ipswich Borough Council election took place on 7 May 2026 to elect members of Ipswich Borough Council in Suffolk, England. This was on the same day as other local elections.

The council was under Labour majority control prior to the election. Reform UK won ten of the sixteen seats contested at this election, but Labour retained its majority.

== Summary ==
=== Election result ===
2026 Ipswich Borough Council election
Party	This election				Full council			This election		
Party	Candidates	Seats	Net	Seats %	Other	Total	Total %	Votes	Votes %	+/−
Labour	16	4	▼9	25.0	25	29	60.4	10,940	26.8	–19.8
Reform	16	10	▲10	62.5	0	10	20.8	12,949	31.7	+28.7
Conservative	15	0	▼2	0.0	5	5	10.4	5,846	14.3	–15.2
Liberal Democrats	12	1	Steady	6.3	2	3	6.3	3,370	8.2	–1.7
Green	16	1	▲1	6.3	0	1	2.1	7,772	19.0	+8.2

== Incumbents ==
Ward	Incumbent councillor	Party	Re-standing
Alexandra	John Cook	Labour Co-op	Yes
Bixley	Edward Phillips	Conservative	Yes
Bridge	Stephen Connelly	Labour Co-op	Yes (Note: Standing in Whitton ward.)
Castle Hill	Sam Murray	Conservative	No
Gainsborough	Lynne Mortimer	Labour	No
Gipping	Elizabeth Hughes	Labour	No
Holywells	George Lankester	Labour	Yes
Priory Heath	Owen Batholomew	Labour	Yes
Rushmere	Stefan Long	Labour	Yes
Sprites	Colin Smart	Labour	Yes
St John's	Neil MacDonald	Labour Co-op	Yes
St Margaret's	Inga Lockington	Liberal Democrats	Yes
Stoke Park	Tony Blacker	Labour	No
Westgate	Colin Kreidewolf	Labour	Yes
Whitehouse	Colin Wright	Labour	Yes
Whitton	Christine Shaw	Labour Co-op	No

== Ward results ==
=== Alexandra ===
Alexandra
Party	Candidate	Votes	%	±%
Green	David Plowman	1,047	34.4	+7.8
Labour Co-op	John Cook*	1,006	33.1	−16.9
Reform	Jeffrey Ciobanu	589	19.4	N/A
Conservative	John Downie	250	8.2	−9.6
Liberal Democrats	Giles Turner	150	4.9	−0.6
Majority		41	1.3	N/A
Turnout		3,060	40.3	+11.2
Registered electors		7,588		
Green gain from Labour Co-op		Swing	▲12.4	

=== Bixley ===
Bixley
Party	Candidate	Votes	%	±%
Reform	David Hill	934	31.1	N/A
Conservative	Edward Phillips*	899	29.9	−17.7
Labour	Paul Anderson	612	20.4	−15.2
Green	Stephanie Cullen	398	13.2	+2.4
Liberal Democrats	Lisa Weichert	161	5.4	−0.6
Majority		35	1.2	N/A
Turnout		3,011	52.8	+14.1
Registered electors		5,706		
Reform gain from Conservative				

=== Bridge ===
Bridge
Party	Candidate	Votes	%	±%
Reform	Rupert Tonkin-Galvin	780	33.5	+22.6
Labour	Polly Ford	686	29.5	−16.7
Green	Jamie Allenden	437	18.8	+9.0
Conservative	Katherine West	291	12.5	−14.2
Liberal Democrats	Henry Williams	133	5.7	−0.7
Majority		94	4.0	N/A
Turnout		2,335	36.2	+10.8
Registered electors		6,503		
Reform gain from Labour Co-op		Swing	▲19.7	

=== Castle Hill ===
Castle Hill
Party	Candidate	Votes	%	±%
Reform	William Patrick	948	35.7	N/A
Conservative	Stephen Ion	581	21.9	−18.1
Labour	Dawn Allum	446	16.8	−19.5
Green	Jennifer McCarthy	423	15.9	+9.0
Liberal Democrats	Martin Pakes	261	9.8	−6.9
Majority		367	13.8	N/A
Turnout		2,676	46.6	+10.5
Registered electors		5,742		
Reform gain from Conservative				

=== Gainsborough ===
Gainsborough
Party	Candidate	Votes	%	±%
Reform	Ryan Proctor	952	42.2	+30.6
Labour	Saffeen Yamulki	530	23.5	−24.2
Conservative	Liz Harsant	402	17.8	−7.9
Green	Juliet Garside	373	16.5	+10.3
Majority		422	18.7	N/A
Turnout		2,269	36.5	+10.5
Registered electors		6,214		
Reform gain from Labour		Swing	▲27.4	

=== Gipping ===
Gipping
Party	Candidate	Votes	%	±%
Reform	Leslie Foster	755	33.9	N/A
Labour	Simona Lazar	692	31.1	−24.7
Green	Dalian Haynes	411	18.4	+8.3
Conservative	Bbosa Kiyingi	234	10.5	−17.6
Liberal Democrats	Daniel Davey	136	6.1	+0.1
Majority		63	2.8	N/A
Turnout		2,238	34.6	+10.1
Registered electors		6,476		
Reform gain from Labour				

=== Holywells ===
Holywells
Party	Candidate	Votes	%	±%
Labour	George Lankester*	990	36.9	−12.3
Reform	Robin Wilkinson	676	25.2	N/A
Green	Rory Richardson-Todd	547	20.4	+10.7
Conservative	Angelina Klein	470	17.5	−15.8
Majority		314	11.7	–4.2
Turnout		2,700	46.9	+10.9
Registered electors		5,755		
Labour hold				

=== Priory Heath ===
Priory Heath
Party	Candidate	Votes	%	±%
Reform	Tim Buttle	876	34.5	N/A
Labour	Owen Bartholomew*	761	29.9	−17.1
Green	Paul Daley	442	17.4	+6.2
Conservative	Albert Demaj	315	12.4	−15.9
Liberal Democrats	Nigel Fox	148	5.8	−0.1
Majority		115	4.6	N/A
Turnout		2,549	37.5	+12.0
Registered electors		6,796		
Reform gain from Labour				

=== Rushmere ===
Rushmere
Party	Candidate	Votes	%	±%
Labour	Stefan Long*	1,031	33.9	−15.7
Reform	Vicky Hill	790	26.0	+18.0
Green	Susan Hagley	536	17.6	+8.2
Conservative	Chijioke Philip	433	14.3	−12.4
Liberal Democrats	Lucy Drake	248	8.2	+2.0
Majority		241	7.9	–15.0
Turnout		3,051	48.8	+10.6
Registered electors		6,247		
Labour hold		Swing	▼16.9	

=== Sprites ===
Sprites
Party	Candidate	Votes	%	±%
Reform	Stuart Allen	894	45.5	N/A
Labour	Colin Smart*	424	21.6	−27.2
Conservative	Michael Scanes	359	18.3	−20.9
Green	Martin Hynes	191	9.7	+1.8
Liberal Democrats	Robin Whitmore	96	4.9	+0.8
Majority		470	23.9	N/A
Turnout		1,972	38.9	+7.9
Registered electors		5,072		
Reform gain from Labour				

=== St John's ===
St John's
Party	Candidate	Votes	%	±%
Labour Co-op	Neil MacDonald*	983	31.6	−18.8
Reform	Joshua Owens	866	27.9	N/A
Green	Leon Paternoster	728	23.4	+8.9
Conservative	Oliver Lee-Pearson	348	11.2	−19.1
Liberal Democrats	Kelly Turner	182	5.9	−5.9
Majority		117	3.7	N/A
Turnout		3,118	44.8	+12.0
Registered electors		6,965		
Labour Co-op hold				

=== St Margaret's ===
St Margaret's
Party	Candidate	Votes	%	±%
Liberal Democrats	Inga Lockington*	1,633	49.2	−1.8
Reform	Graham Knight	546	16.4	N/A
Green	Kirsty Wilmot	410	12.3	+0.2
Conservative	Laura Allenby	379	11.4	−5.6
Labour	Steven Reynolds	353	10.6	−9.3
Majority		1,087	32.8	+1.7
Turnout		3,331	52.2	+8.6
Registered electors		6,382		
Liberal Democrats hold				

=== Stoke Park ===
Stoke Park
Party	Candidate	Votes	%	±%
Reform	Morgan Brobyn	842	41.4	N/A
Conservative	Sian Gubb	443	21.8	−19.1
Labour	Mika Berculean	418	20.6	−24.0
Green	Barry Broom	330	16.2	+6.2
Majority		399	19.6	N/A
Turnout		2,047	40.0	+6.5
Registered electors		5,116		
Reform gain from Labour				

=== Westgate ===
Westgate
Party	Candidate	Votes	%	±%
Labour	Colin Kreidewolf*	805	36.2	−19.2
Green	John Mann	519	23.4	+9.5
Reform	James Hollins	508	22.9	N/A
Conservative	Stephen Kirby	253	11.4	−10.5
Liberal Democrats	Martin Hore	137	6.2	−2.5
Majority		286	12.8	–20.7
Turnout		2,227	35.6	+9.1
Registered electors		6,264		
Labour hold		Swing	▼14.4	

=== Whitehouse ===
Whitehouse
Party	Candidate	Votes	%	±%
Reform	David Hurlbut	880	39.7	+26.8
Green	Julie Shooter	580	26.1	+15.3
Labour	Colin Wright*	485	21.9	−29.1
Conservative	Mark Phillips	189	8.5	−12.0
Liberal Democrats	Trevor Powell	85	3.8	−0.9
Majority		300	13.6	N/A
Turnout		2,230	35.1	+11.9
Registered electors		6,353		
Reform gain from Labour		Swing	▲5.8	

=== Whitton ===
Whitton
Party	Candidate	Votes	%	±%
Reform	Tony Gould	1,113	49.9	+35.2
Labour Co-op	Stephen Connelly*	718	32.2	−12.9
Green	Groovy Scott	400	17.9	+12.1
Majority		395	17.7	N/A
Turnout		2,267	36.0	+6.3
Registered electors		6,302		
Reform gain from Labour Co-op		Swing	▲24.1	

== 2026 nominees ==
Notice of Persons Nominated and Notice of Poll - Ipswich Borough Council.pdf
