= Bridge Ward, Ipswich =

Ward in Ipswich

Bridge
- ward for Ipswich Council
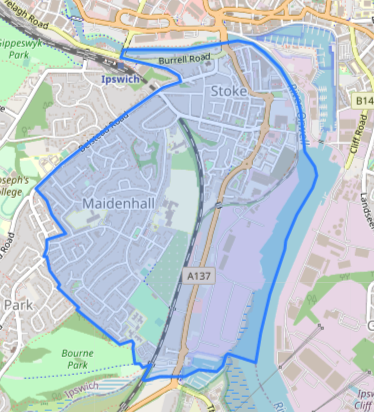
- Boundary of Bridge in Ipswich from 2021.
- Local government in East of England: Suffolk

Current ward
- Created: 2002
- Councillor: Bryony Rudkin (Labour)
- Councillor: Stephen Connolly (Labour)
- Councillor: Philip Smart (Labour)

Bridge Ward is a ward in the South West Area of Ipswich, Suffolk, England. It returns three councillors to Ipswich Borough Council.

It is designated Middle Layer Super Output Area Ipswich 012 by the Office for National Statistics. It is composed of 6 Lower Layer Super Output Areas.

== Ward profile, 2008 ==
Bridge Ward is located to the south of central Ipswich. In 2005 it had a population of about 7,500. A high proportion of its residents live alone.

== Councillors ==
The following councillors were elected since the boundaries were changed in 2002. Names in brackets indicates that the councillor remained in office without re-election.

Date	Councillor	Councillor	Councillor
May 2002	James Powell	Harold Mangar	Philip Smart
May 2003	(James Powell)	(Harold Mangar)	Philip Smart
June 2004	(James Powell)	Steve Flood	(Philip Smart)
May 2006	James Powell	(Steve Flood)	(Philip Smart)
May 2007	(James Powell)	(Steve Flood)	Philip Smart
May 2008	(James Powell)	Bryony Rudkin	(Philip Smart)
May 2010	James Powell	(Bryony Rudkin)	(Philip Smart)
May 2011	(James Powell)	(Bryony Rudkin)	Philip Smart
May 2012	(James Powell)	Bryony Rudkin	(Philip Smart)
May 2014	James Powell	(Bryony Rudkin)	(Philip Smart)
May 2015|	(James Powell)	(Bryony Rudkin)	Philip Smart
May 2016	(James Powell)	Bryony Rudkin	(Philip Smart)
May 2018	Collette Allen	(Bryony Rudkin)	(Philip Smart)
May 2019	(Collette Allen)	(Bryony Rudkin)	Philip Smart
May 2021	(Collette Allen)	Bryony Rudkin	(Philip Smart)
May 2022	Stephen Connolly	(Bryony Rudkin)	(Philip Smart)
May 2023	(Stephen Connolly)	(Bryony Rudkin)	Philip Smart
May 2024	(Stephen Connolly)	Bryony Rudkin	(Philip Smart)
