= 1999 Ipswich Borough Council election =

1999 UK local government election

- 6 May 1999

19 out of 48 seats to Ipswich Borough Council 25 seats needed for a majority
	First party	Second party	Third party
Party	Labour	Conservative	Liberal Democrats
Last election	40 seats, 47.8%	8 seats, 34.3%	0 seats, 14.6%
Seats won	13	5	1
Seats after	37	10	1
Seat change	▼3	▲2	▲1
Popular vote	13,701	10,687	3,167
Percentage	49.0%	38.2%	11.3%
Swing	▲1.2%	▲3.9%	▼3.3%
- Winner of each seat at the 1999 Ipswich Borough Council election.
Control before election
Labour
Control after election
Labour

Elections for Ipswich Borough Council were held on 6 May 1999. One third of the council was up for election and the Labour Party kept overall control of the council.

After the election, the composition of the council was:

- Labour 37
- Conservative 10
- Liberal Democrat 1

== Summary ==
=== Election result ===
1999 Ipswich Borough Council election
Party	This election				Full council			This election		
Party	Candidates	Seats	Net	Seats %	Other	Total	Total %	Votes	Votes %	+/−
Labour	19	13	▼3	68.4	24	37	77.1	13,701	49.0	+1.2
Conservative	18	5	▲2	26.3	5	10	20.8	10,687	38.2	+3.9
Liberal Democrats	11	1	▲1	5.3	0	1	2.1	3,167	11.3	-3.3
Independent Labour	2	0	Steady	0.0	0	0	0.0	337	1.2	-1.9
Independent	1	0	Steady	0.0	0	0	0.0	82	0.3	N/A

== Ward results ==
Incumbent councillors standing for re-election are marked with an asterisk (*). Changes in seats do not take into account defections.

=== Bixley ===
Bixley (2 seats due to by-election)
Party	Candidate	Votes	%	±%
Conservative	W. Wright*	1,081	60.9	+6.3
Conservative	G. Terry	1,056	59.4	+4.8
Labour	C. Campbell	529	29.8	−0.1
Labour	G. Rusher	441	24.8	−5.1
Liberal Democrats	J. Shirley	320	18.0	+2.5
Turnout		~1,776	30.7	+0.5
Registered electors		5,786		
Conservative hold				
Conservative hold				

=== Bridge ===
Bridge
Party	Candidate	Votes	%	±%
Labour	P. Smart*	810	68.5	+3.4
Conservative	P. Collyer	372	31.5	+8.1
Majority		438	37.0	−4.7
Turnout		1,182	20.7	+1.3
Registered electors		5,757		
Labour hold		Swing	▼2.4	

=== Broom Hill ===
Broom Hill (2 seats due to by-election)
Party	Candidate	Votes	%	±%
Labour	M. Blake	712	48.9	+7.8
Conservative	D. Goldsmith	698	47.9	+3.4
Conservative	M. Green	672	46.2	+1.7
Labour	H. Mangar	624	42.9	+1.8
Turnout		~1,456	28.5	+2.1
Registered electors		5,109		
Labour hold				
Conservative gain from Labour				

=== Castle Hill ===
Castle Hill
Party	Candidate	Votes	%	±%
Conservative	D. Jackson	902	45.8	−5.2
Labour	T. Payne*	862	43.8	+6.1
Liberal Democrats	D. Day	206	10.5	−0.8
Majority		40	2.0	−11.3
Turnout		1,970	34.3	+2.2
Registered electors		5,759		
Conservative gain from Labour		Swing	▼5.7	

=== Chantry ===
Chantry
Party	Candidate	Votes	%	±%
Labour	D. Ellesmere*	691	67.4	−1.6
Conservative	A. Thrussell	244	23.8	+3.2
Liberal Democrats	D. Perkins	90	8.8	−1.6
Majority		447	43.6	−4.8
Turnout		1,025	23.1	+2.1
Registered electors		4,453		
Labour hold		Swing	▼2.4	

=== Gainsborough ===
Gainsborough
Party	Candidate	Votes	%	±%
Labour	J. Brown	819	56.9	+8.0
Conservative	K. Matthews	380	26.4	+10.2
Independent Labour	R. Crane	240	16.7	−10.3
Majority		439	30.5	+8.6
Turnout		1,439	24.4	−1.9
Registered electors		5,890		
Labour hold		Swing	▼1.1	

=== Priory Heath ===
Priory Heath
Party	Candidate	Votes	%	±%
Labour	B. Maguire*	649	51.7	+3.0
Conservative	D. Webb	308	24.5	+0.9
Liberal Democrats	J. Fletcher	202	16.1	+5.7
Independent Labour	R. Lawrence	97	7.7	−9.7
Majority		341	27.2	+2.1
Turnout		1,256	23.4	+1.3
Registered electors		5,395		
Labour hold		Swing	▲1.1	

=== Rushmere ===
Rushmere
Party	Candidate	Votes	%	±%
Labour	M. Mawson	990	49.4	−0.3
Conservative	N. Rivers	779	38.8	−1.0
Liberal Democrats	R. Atkins	237	11.8	+1.3
Majority		211	10.6	+0.7
Turnout		2,006	33.8	+1.0
Registered electors		6,045		
Labour hold		Swing	▲0.4	

=== Sprites ===
Sprites (2 seats due to by-election)
Party	Candidate	Votes	%	±%
Labour	G. Goodall*	832	64.7	−3.6
Labour	C. Newbury	765	59.5	−8.8
Conservative	K. Kenna	407	31.6	+10.8
Conservative	B. Thrussell	354	27.5	+6.7
Turnout		~1,286	24.1	+2.6
Registered electors		5,338		
Labour hold				
Labour hold				

=== St Clements ===
St Clements
Party	Candidate	Votes	%	±%
Conservative	D. Hale	958	47.0	+5.1
Labour	M. Fenwick	828	40.6	−1.3
Liberal Democrats	R. Whitmore	170	8.3	−2.2
Independent	R. Allum	82	4.0	N/A
Majority		130	6.4	N/A
Turnout		2,038	35.6	+3.7
Registered electors		5,735		
Conservative gain from Labour		Swing	▲3.2	

=== St John's ===
St John's
Party	Candidate	Votes	%	±%
Labour	S. Percival	892	50.2	+1.8
Conservative	D. Ward	674	38.0	+3.5
Liberal Democrats	T. Gilbert	210	11.8	−3.6
Majority		218	12.2	−1.7
Turnout		1,776	28.9	−0.4
Registered electors		6,171		
Labour hold		Swing	▼0.9	

=== St Margaret's ===
St Margaret's
Party	Candidate	Votes	%	±%
Liberal Democrats	I. Lockington	1,030	42.4	+6.6
Conservative	P. West*	959	39.5	−0.8
Labour	S. Reynolds	439	18.1	−5.9
Majority		71	3.7	N/A
Turnout		2,428	39.5	−1.7
Registered electors		6,171		
Liberal Democrats gain from Conservative		Swing	▲3.7	

=== Stoke Park ===
Stoke Park
Party	Candidate	Votes	%	±%
Labour	M. Cook*	740	65.3	+9.5
Liberal Democrats	D. Mullett	393	34.7	+21.2
Majority		347	30.6	+5.1
Turnout		1,133	20.8	+0.1
Registered electors		5,523		
Labour hold		Swing	▼5.9	

=== Town ===
Town
Party	Candidate	Votes	%	±%
Labour	S. Baguley*	838	63.2	−0.7
Conservative	C. Vajzovic	300	22.6	+0.7
Liberal Democrats	K. Wroe	187	14.1	−0.2
Majority		530	40.6	+1.4
Turnout		1,325	21.3	±0.0
Registered electors		6,264		
Labour hold		Swing	▼0.7	

=== Whitehouse ===
Whitehouse
Party	Candidate	Votes	%	±%
Labour	K. Herod	541	60.4	−3.3
Conservative	M. Stagg	233	26.0	+2.0
Liberal Democrats	N. Day	122	13.6	+1.3
Majority		308	34.4	−5.3
Turnout		896	17.0	+0.1
Registered electors		5,286		
Labour hold		Swing	▼2.7	

=== Whitton ===
Whitton
Party	Candidate	Votes	%	±%
Labour	G. Clarke*	699	69.3	+4.2
Conservative	S. Lark	310	30.7	+6.4
Majority		389	38.6	−2.2
Turnout		1,009	20.5	+1.3
Registered electors		4,956		
Labour hold		Swing	▼1.1	
