= 1998 Ipswich Borough Council election =

1998 election results for Ipswich Borough Council

- 7 May 1998

16 out of 48 seats to Ipswich Borough Council 25 seats needed for a majority
	First party	Second party	Third party
Party	Labour	Conservative	Liberal Democrats
Last election	41 seats, 62.4%	6 seats, 25.7%	1 seat, 11.8%
Seats won	12	4	0
Seats after	40	8	0
Seat change	▼1	▲2	▼1
Popular vote	11,146	8,004	3,405
Percentage	47.8%	34.3%	14.6%
Swing	▼14.6%	▲8.6%	▲2.8%
- Winner of each seat at the 1998 Ipswich Borough Council election.
Control before election
Labour
Control after election
Labour

Elections for Ipswich Borough Council were held on 7 May 1998. One third of the council was up for election and the Labour Party kept overall control of the council.

After the election, the composition of the council was:

- Labour 40
- Conservative 8

== Summary ==
=== Election result ===
1998 Ipswich Borough Council election
Party	This election				Full council			This election		
Party	Candidates	Seats	Net	Seats %	Other	Total	Total %	Votes	Votes %	+/−
Labour	16	12	▼1	75.0	28	40	83.3	11,146	47.8	–14.6
Conservative	16	4	▲2	25.0	4	8	16.7	8,004	34.3	+8.6
Liberal Democrats	16	0	▼1	0.0	0	0	0.0	3,405	14.6	+2.8
Independent Labour	3	0	Steady	0.0	0	0	0.0	724	3.1	N/A
UKIP	1	0	Steady	0.0	0	0	0.0	29	0.1	N/A

== Ward results ==
Incumbent councillors standing for re-election are marked with an asterisk (*). Changes in seats do not take into account defections.

=== Bixley ===
Bixley
Party	Candidate	Votes	%	±%
Conservative	S. Barker*	970	54.6	+4.1
Labour	S. Watson	532	29.9	−6.9
Liberal Democrats	J. Rivett	275	15.5	+2.8
Majority		438	24.7	+11.0
Turnout		1,777	30.2	−5.2
Registered electors		5,834		
Conservative hold		Swing	▲5.5	

=== Bridge ===
Bridge
Party	Candidate	Votes	%	±%
Labour	J. Powell*	715	65.1	−5.5
Conservative	K. Kenna	257	23.4	+6.2
Liberal Democrats	S. Rush	127	11.6	−0.6
Majority		458	41.7	−11.7
Turnout		1,099	19.4	−5.9
Registered electors		5,656		
Labour hold		Swing	▼5.9	

=== Broom Hill ===
Broom Hill
Party	Candidate	Votes	%	±%
Conservative	J. Cooper	601	44.5	+5.5
Labour	K. Herod	555	41.1	−4.4
Liberal Democrats	N. Cheeseman	196	14.5	−1.0
Majority		46	3.4	N/A
Turnout		1,352	26.4	−8.7
Registered electors		5,085		
Conservative hold		Swing	▲5.0	

=== Castle Hill ===
Castle Hill
Party	Candidate	Votes	%	±%
Conservative	H. Davies	943	51.0	+12.5
Labour	C. Newbury	696	37.7	−14.6
Liberal Democrats	D. Day	209	11.3	+2.1
Majority		247	13.3	N/A
Turnout		1,848	32.1	−6.2
Registered electors		5,734		
Conservative gain from Labour		Swing	▲13.6	

=== Chantry ===
Chantry
Party	Candidate	Votes	%	±%
Labour	T. Watson*	646	69.0	−10.2
Conservative	P. Murray-Cowan	193	20.6	+8.0
Liberal Democrats	D. Perkins	97	10.4	+2.2
Majority		453	48.4	N/A
Turnout		936	21.0	−6.1
Registered electors		4,441		
Labour hold		Swing	▼9.1	

=== Gainsborough ===
Gainsborough
Party	Candidate	Votes	%	±%
Labour	D. Edwards*	751	48.9	−20.0
Independent Labour	R. Crane	414	27.0	N/A
Conservative	K. Matthews	248	16.2	−0.1
Liberal Democrats	M. Whitehead	122	7.9	−6.9
Majority		337	21.9	−30.7
Turnout		1,535	26.3	−3.5
Registered electors		5,823		
Labour hold				

=== Priory Heath ===
Priory Heath
Party	Candidate	Votes	%	±%
Labour	D. Jabbar*	577	48.7	−22.0
Conservative	D. Webb	280	23.6	+4.3
Independent Labour	R. Lawrence	206	17.4	N/A
Liberal Democrats	J. Fletcher	123	10.4	+0.4
Majority		297	25.1	−26.3
Turnout		1,186	22.1	−6.9
Registered electors		5,348		
Labour hold		Swing	▼13.2	

=== Rushmere ===
Rushmere
Party	Candidate	Votes	%	±%
Labour	J. Le Grys*	986	49.7	−13.9
Conservative	N. Rivers	788	39.8	+14.6
Liberal Democrats	R. Atkins	208	10.5	−0.6
Majority		198	9.9	−28.5
Turnout		1,982	32.8	−6.2
Registered electors		6,023		
Labour hold		Swing	▼14.3	

=== Sprites ===
Sprites
Party	Candidate	Votes	%	±%
Labour	I. Grimwood*	783	68.3	−10.0
Conservative	A. Thrussell	238	20.8	+8.0
Liberal Democrats	T. Gilbert	125	10.9	+2.0
Majority		545	47.5	−18.0
Turnout		1,146	21.5	−7.6
Registered electors		5,339		
Labour hold		Swing	▼9.0	

=== St Clements ===
St Clements
Party	Candidate	Votes	%	±%
Labour	E. Grant*	767	41.94	−20.1
Conservative	S. Ion	766	41.88	+16.5
Liberal Democrats	R. Whitmore	192	10.5	−2.1
Independent Labour	R. Allum	104	5.7	N/A
Majority		1	0.06	−36.5
Turnout		1,829	31.9	−2.4
Registered electors		5,712		
Labour hold		Swing	▼18.3	

=== St John's ===
St John's
Party	Candidate	Votes	%	±%
Labour	E. Cooper	863	48.4	−14.4
Conservative	D. Ward	616	34.5	+14.1
Liberal Democrats	I. Lockington	275	15.4	−1.3
UKIP	W. Vinyard	29	1.6	N/A
Majority		247	13.9	−28.5
Turnout		1,783	29.3	−1.7
Registered electors		6,039		
Labour hold		Swing	▼14.3	

=== St Margaret's ===
St Margaret's
Party	Candidate	Votes	%	±%
Conservative	D. Brown	1,016	40.3	+1.1
Liberal Democrats	M. Pakes*	902	35.8	+13.6
Labour	S. Percival	605	24.0	−14.6
Majority		114	4.5	+3.9
Turnout		2,523	41.2	−5.7
Registered electors		6,073		
Conservative gain from Liberal Democrats		Swing	▲6.3	

=== Stoke Park ===
Stoke Park
Party	Candidate	Votes	%	±%
Labour	K. Rawlingson	646	55.8	−9.1
Conservative	G. Terry	356	30.7	+5.5
Liberal Democrats	D. Mullett	156	13.5	+3.6
Majority		290	25.1	−14.6
Turnout		1,158	20.7	−5.7
Registered electors		5,606		
Labour hold		Swing	▼7.3	

=== Town ===
Town
Party	Candidate	Votes	%	±%
Labour	D. Hosking*	832	63.9	−2.5
Conservative	D. Goldsmith	285	21.9	+2.5
Liberal Democrats	K. Wroe	186	14.3	+1.9
Majority		547	42.0	−5.0
Turnout		1,303	21.3	−6.1
Registered electors		6,086		
Labour hold		Swing	▼2.5	

=== Whitehouse ===
Whitehouse
Party	Candidate	Votes	%	±%
Labour	A. Grant*	568	63.7	−11.9
Conservative	G. Morris	214	24.0	+8.8
Liberal Democrats	N. Day	110	12.3	+3.1
Majority		354	39.7	−20.7
Turnout		1,303	16.9	−7.0
Registered electors		5,262		
Labour hold		Swing	▼10.4	

=== Whitton ===
Whitton
Party	Candidate	Votes	%	±%
Labour	P. Gardiner*	624	65.1	−9.8
Conservative	S. Lark	233	24.3	+8.7
Liberal Democrats	S. Theiner	102	10.6	+1.1
Majority		391	40.8	−18.5
Turnout		959	19.2	−6.4
Registered electors		4,971		
Labour hold		Swing	▼9.3	
