= 2004 Ipswich Borough Council election =

2004 UK local government election

← 2003	10 June 2004	2006 →

16 of the 48 seats 25 seats needed for a majority
	First party	Second party	Third party
Party	Labour	Conservative	Liberal Democrats
Last election	31	12	5
Seats won	5	9	3
Seats after	23	18	7
Seat change	▼8	▲6	▲2
Popular vote	10,656	13,392	8,626
Percentage	32.1%	40.4%	26.0%
Swing	▼0.4%	▲1.2%	▲0.2%
- Map showing the 2004 local election results in Ipswich.
Council control before election
Labour
Council control after election
No overall control

Elections for Ipswich Borough Council were held on 10 June 2004. One third of the council was up for election and the Labour Party lost overall control of the council to no overall control. A Conservative-Liberal Democrat coalition was formed after the election.

After the election, the composition of the council was:

- Labour 23
- Conservative 18
- Liberal Democrat 7

== Election result ==
Ipswich local election result 2004
Party	Seats	Gains	Losses	Net gain/loss	Seats %	Votes %	Votes	+/−
Conservative	9	6	0	+6	52.9	40.4	13,392	+1.2
Labour	5	0	8	-8	29.4	32.1	10,656	-0.4
Liberal Democrats	3	2	0	+2	17.6	26.0	8,626	+0.2
CPA	0	0	0	0	0.0	0.8	281	-0.6
Independent	0	0	0	0	0.0	0.4	136	+0.4
Monster Raving Loony	0	0	0	0	0.0	0.2	71	+0.2

== Ward results ==
=== Alexandra ===
Alexandra
Party	Candidate	Votes	%	±%
Liberal Democrats	Louise Gooch	802	41.2	−1.7
Labour	John Cook	661	34.0	−0.5
Conservative	Keith Matthews	483	24.8	+7.8
Majority		141	7.2	−1.2
Turnout		1,946		
Liberal Democrats gain from Labour		Swing		

=== Bixley ===
Bixley
Party	Candidate	Votes	%	±%
Conservative	Paul Carter	1,325	53.8	+7.4
Liberal Democrats	John Rivett	704	28.6	−1.5
Labour	Martyn Green	351	14.2	−2.8
CPA	Christine Pinder	84	3.4	−3.2
Majority		621	25.2	+8.9
Turnout		2,464		
Conservative hold		Swing		

=== Bridge ===
Bridge
Party	Candidate	Votes	%	±%
Conservative	Steve Flood	693	39.7	+5.0
Labour	Harold Mangar	673	38.6	−4.5
Liberal Democrats	Nicholas Jacob	379	21.7	−0.5
Majority		20	1.1	
Turnout		1,745		
Conservative gain from Labour		Swing		

=== Castle Hill ===
Castle Hill
Party	Candidate	Votes	%	±%
Conservative	Dale Jackson	1,189	55.8	−2.2
Labour	Peter Shaw	473	22.2	+0.9
Liberal Democrats	Charles Tracy	470	22.0	+1.3
Majority		716	33.6	−3.1
Turnout		2,132		
Conservative hold		Swing		

=== Gainsborough ===
Gainsborough
Party	Candidate	Votes	%	±%
Labour	John Mowles	769	44.9	−0.9
Conservative	Janet Sibley	531	31.0	+1.8
Liberal Democrats	Robert Chambers	288	16.8	−2.8
Monster Raving Loony	Paul Billingham	71	4.1	+4.1
CPA	Jonathan Barnes	54	3.2	−2.1
Majority		238	13.9	−2.7
Turnout		1,713		
Labour hold		Swing		

=== Gipping ===
Gipping
Party	Candidate	Votes	%	±%
Labour	David Ellesmere	671	44.0	−0.5
Conservative	Nadia Cenci	458	30.0	−1.7
Liberal Democrats	Bob Zablok	397	26.0	+2.2
Majority		213	14.0	+1.2
Turnout		1,526		
Labour hold		Swing		

=== Holywells ===
Holywells
Party	Candidate	Votes	%	±%
Conservative	David Hale	806	49.5	−5.6
Labour	Susan Maguire	470	28.9	+2.1
Liberal Democrats	Robin Whitmore	353	21.7	+3.6
Majority		336	20.6	−7.7
Turnout		1,629		
Conservative hold		Swing		

=== Priory Heath ===
Priory Heath
Party	Candidate	Votes	%	±%
Labour	William Quinton	731	42.2	+3.9
Conservative	Duncan Titchmarsh	644	37.1	+3.5
Liberal Democrats	Jill Atkins	359	20.7	−0.8
Majority		87	5.1	+0.4
Turnout		1,734		
Labour hold		Swing		

=== Rushmere (2) ===
Rushmere (2)
Party	Candidate	Votes	%	±%
Conservative	Stephen Ion	928		
Conservative	Judy Terry	867		
Labour	Alasdair Ross	719		
Labour	Keith Herod	696		
Liberal Democrats	Gilliam Auton	547		
Liberal Democrats	Kenneth Toye	421		
CPA	Stephen Bloomfield	143		
Turnout		4,321		
Conservative gain from Labour		Swing		
Conservative gain from Labour		Swing		

=== Sprites ===
Sprites
Party	Candidate	Votes	%	±%
Labour	Richard Kirby	861	43.2	+1.6
Conservative	Robert Hall	832	41.8	+0.6
Liberal Democrats	Simon Cooper	299	15.0	−2.1
Majority		29	1.5	+1.1
Turnout		1,992		
Labour hold		Swing		

=== St John's ===
St John's
Party	Candidate	Votes	%	±%
Conservative	John Carnall	842	39.2	+4.8
Labour	Elizabeth Cooper	796	37.0	−2.2
Liberal Democrats	Cathy French	511	23.8	+3.0
Majority		46	2.2	
Turnout		2,149		
Conservative gain from Labour		Swing		

=== St Margaret's ===
St Margaret's
Party	Candidate	Votes	%	±%
Liberal Democrats	Richard Atkins	1,336	47.9	+1.9
Conservative	David Brown	1,119	40.1	−0.9
Labour	Jane Shaw	337	12.1	−0.9
Majority		217	7.8	+2.8
Turnout		2,792		
Liberal Democrats hold		Swing		

=== Stoke Park ===
Stoke Park
Party	Candidate	Votes	%	±%
Conservative	Paul West	894	48.0	+6.4
Labour	Barry Studd	609	32.7	−3.8
Liberal Democrats	Adrian Brown	358	19.2	−2.7
Majority		285	15.3	+10.2
Turnout		1,861		
Conservative gain from Labour		Swing		

=== Westgate ===
Westgate
Party	Candidate	Votes	%	±%
Labour	Carole Jones	632	36.8	−4.0
Conservative	Julie Schubert	480	27.9	−5.6
Liberal Democrats	Catherine Chambers	471	27.4	+1.7
Independent	Sally Wainman	136	7.9	+7.9
Majority		152	8.9	+1.6
Turnout		1,719		
Labour hold		Swing		

=== Whitehouse ===
Whitehouse
Party	Candidate	Votes	%	±%
Liberal Democrats	Anthony James	564	35.0	−4.4
Labour	William Knowles	556	34.5	+3.6
Conservative	Colin Morgan	491	30.5	+0.9
Majority		8	0.5	−8.0
Turnout		1,611		
Liberal Democrats gain from Labour		Swing		

=== Whitton ===
Whitton
Party	Candidate	Votes	%	±%
Conservative	Donald Ward	810	44.3	−0.4
Labour	John Harris	651	35.6	−3.2
Liberal Democrats	Joan Goodall	367	20.1	+3.6
Majority		159	8.7	+2.8
Turnout		1,828		
Conservative gain from Labour		Swing		
