= 2011 Ipswich Borough Council election =

2011 UK local government election

← 2010	5 May 2011	2012 →

16 of the 48 seats 25 seats needed for a majority
	First party	Second party	Third party
Party	Labour	Conservative	Liberal Democrats
Last election	23	18	7
Seats won	12	4	0
Seats after	28	16	4
Seat change	▲5	▼2	▼3
Popular vote	17,522	13,675	4,798
Percentage	47.4%	37.0%	13.0%
- Map showing the 2011 local election results in Ipswich.
Council control before election
No overall control
Council control after election
Labour

Elections for Ipswich Borough Council were held on Thursday 5 May 2011. One third of the seats were up for election and the Labour Party gained control of the council, which had previously been run under by a Conservative – Liberal Democrat coalition since 2004.

After the election, the composition of the council was:

- Labour 28
- Conservative 16
- Liberal Democrat 4

== Ward results ==
=== Alexandra ===
Alexandra
Party	Candidate	Votes	%
Labour	Harvey Crane	1,158	49.5%
Liberal Democrats	Jane Chambers	577	24.7%
Conservative	Roy Flood	449	19.2%
Green	Jane Scott	155	6.6%
Majority		581	24.8%
Turnout		2,339	
Liberal Democrats hold			

=== Bixley ===
Bixley
Party	Candidate	Votes	%
Conservative	Kym Stroet	1,518	55.4%
Labour	Kanthasamy Elavalakan	833	30.4%
Liberal Democrats	Clive Witter	388	14.2%
Majority		685	25.0%
Turnout		2,739	
Conservative hold			

=== Bridge ===
Bridge
Party	Candidate	Votes	%
Labour	Philip Smart	1,150	55.7%
Conservative	James Spencer	712	34.5%
Liberal Democrats	Juliet Groves	204	9.9%
Majority		438	21.2%
Turnout		2,066	
Labour hold			

=== Castle Hill ===
Castle Hill
Party	Candidate	Votes	%
Conservative	David Goldsmith	1,262	51.4%
Labour	John Harris	837	34.1%
Liberal Democrats	Robin Whitmore	180	7.3%
Green	Jennifer Overett	174	7.1%
Majority		425	17.3%
Turnout			
Conservative hold			

=== Gainsborough ===
Gainsborough
Party	Candidate	Votes	%
Labour	Martin Cook	1,263	62.3%
Conservative	Carol Debman	623	30.7%
Liberal Democrats	Jill Atkins	141	7.0%
Majority		640	31.6%
Turnout		2,027	
Labour hold			

=== Gipping ===
Gipping
Party	Candidate	Votes	%
Labour	Peter Gardiner	1,204	61.0%
Conservative	Maureen Springle	544	27.6%
Liberal Democrats	Stuart McHardy	226	11.4%
Majority		660	33.4%
Turnout		1,974	
Labour hold			

=== Holywells ===
Holywells
Party	Candidate	Votes	%
Conservative	Liz Harsant	968	44.6%
Labour	Kenneth Douglas	875	40.3%
Liberal Democrats	Rebecca Robinson	213	9.8%
Independent	Dale Jackson	114	5.3%
Majority		93	4.3%
Turnout		2,170	
Conservative hold			

=== Priory Heath ===
Priory Heath
Party	Candidate	Votes	%
Labour	William Knowles	1,290	60.3%
Conservative	Oliver Hartley	605	28.3%
Liberal Democrats	Mathew Baker	244	11.4%
Majority		685	32.0%
Turnout		2,139	
Labour hold			

=== Rushmere ===
Rushmere
Party	Candidate	Votes	%
Labour	Tracy Grant	1,490	50.5%
Conservative	Stephen Ion	1,215	41.2%
Liberal Democrats	Gareth Jones	246	8.3%
Majority		275	9.3%
Turnout		2,951	
Labour gain from Conservative			

=== Sprites ===
Sprites
Party	Candidate	Votes	%
Labour	Roger Fern	1,202	57.0%
Conservative	Robert Hall	781	37.0%
Liberal Democrats	Kenneth Toye	126	6.0%
Majority		421	20.0%
Turnout		2,109	
Labour hold			

=== St John's ===
Sprites
Party	Candidate	Votes	%
Labour	Neil Macdonald	1,534	56.1%
Conservative	Edward Phillips	948	34.7%
Liberal Democrats	Richard Hardacre	253	9.3%
Majority		586	21.4%
Turnout		2,735	
Labour hold			

=== St Margaret's ===
St Margaret's
Party	Candidate	Votes	%
Conservative	Karen Stokes	1,167	37.0%
Liberal Democrats	Kathy French	1,107	35.1%
Labour	Kimberley Cook	671	21.3%
Green	Amy Drayson	211	6.7%
Majority		60	1.9%
Turnout			
Conservative gain from Liberal Democrats			

=== Stoke Park ===
Stoke Park
Party	Candidate	Votes	%
Labour	Barry Studd	985	47.1%
Conservative	Richard Pope	876	41.9%
Green	Barry Broom	129	6.2%
Liberal Democrats	Kevin Lock	103	4.9%
Majority		109	5.2%
Turnout		2,093	
Labour gain from Conservative			

=== Westgate ===
Westgate
Party	Candidate	Votes	%
Labour	Julian Gibbs	972	49.4%
Conservative	Lee Reynolds	435	22.1%
Liberal Democrats	Timothy Lockington	391	19.9%
Green	John Mann	171	8.7%
Majority		537	27.3%
Turnout		1,969	
Labour gain from Liberal Democrats			

=== Whitehouse ===
Whitehouse
Party	Candidate	Votes	%
Labour	Martin Goonan	950	52.1%
Conservative	Pamela Stewart	632	34.7%
Liberal Democrats	Robert Chambers	241	13.2%
Majority		318	17.4%
Turnout		1,823	
Labour hold			

=== Whitton ===
Whitton
Party	Candidate	Votes	%
Labour	Stephen Connelly	1,108	50.2%
Conservative	Michelle Bevan-Margetts	940	42.6%
Liberal Democrats	Nicholas Jacob	158	7.2%
Majority		168	7.6%
Turnout		2,206	
Labour hold			
