= 2014 Ipswich Borough Council election =

2014 UK local government election

- 22 May 2014

16 of the 48 seats 25 seats needed for a majority
	First party	Second party	Third party
Party	Labour	Conservative	Liberal Democrats
Last election	32	12	4
Seats won	12	4	1
Seats after	35	10	3
Seat change	▲3	▼2	▼1
Popular vote	13,176	9,544	2,855
Percentage	38.0%	27.5%	8.2%
- Map showing the 2014 local election results in Ipswich.
Council control before election
Labour
Council control after election
Labour

The 2014 Ipswich Borough Council election took place on 22 May 2014 to elect members of Ipswich Borough Council in England. This was on the same day as other local elections.

After the election, the composition of the council was:

- Labour 35
- Conservative 10
- Liberal Democrat 3

== Ward results ==
=== Alexandra ===
Alexandra (2)
Party	Candidate	Votes	%
Labour	John Cook	935	24.5
Labour	Jane Riley	917	24.1
UKIP	Jose Esteves	444	11.7
Conservative	Mark Felix-Thomas	400	10.5
Green	James White	390	10.2
Conservative	Alex Hopkins	331	8.7
Liberal Democrats	Robert Chambers	215	5.6
Liberal Democrats	Andrew Houseley	180	4.7
Rejected ballots		6	
Total votes		2,217	
Turnout			34

=== Bixley ===
Bixley
Party	Candidate	Votes	%
Conservative	Edward Phillips	1,141	47.8
Labour	Paul Anderson	566	23.7
UKIP	Robert Odhams	504	21.1
Liberal Democrats	Martin Hore	105	4.4
Majority		575	24.1
Rejected ballots		7	
Total votes		2,395	
Turnout			42

=== Bridge ===
Bridge
Party	Candidate	Votes	%
Labour	Jim Powell	815	43.3
UKIP	John Langford	506	26.9
Conservative	Katherine Parkinson	339	18.0
Green	Eric Nelson	135	7.2
Liberal Democrats	Julie Fletcher	89	4.7
Majority		309	16.4
Rejected ballots		3	
Total votes		1,887	
Turnout			29

=== Castle Hill ===
Castle Hill
Party	Candidate	Votes	%
Conservative	Christopher Stewart	850	37.3
UKIP	Dale Jackson	649	28.5
Labour	Annabel Mednick	644	28.3
Liberal Democrats	Oliver Holmes	136	6.0
Majority		201	8.8
Rejected ballots		7	
Total votes		2,286	
Turnout			39

=== Gainsborough ===
Gainsborough
Party	Candidate	Votes	%
Labour	Andi Hopgood	876	41.8
UKIP	John Beard	666	31.8
Conservative	Carol Debman	420	20.1
Green	Ned Harrison	99	4.7
Liberal Democrats	Ken Toye	39	1.9
Majority		210	10.0
Rejected ballots		6	
Total votes		2,100	
Turnout			33

=== Gipping ===
Gipping
Party	Candidate	Votes	%
Labour	Jeannette MacArtney	1,109	62.1
Conservative	Steve Flood	481	26.9
Liberal Democrats	Stuart McHardy	197	11.0
Majority		628	35.2
Rejected ballots		59	
Total votes		1,844	
Turnout			30

=== Holywells ===
Holywells ward
Party	Candidate	Votes	%
Conservative	George Debman	817	37.8
Labour	Colin Smart	728	33.7
UKIP	Mark Dobrzanski	370	17.1
Green	Tom Wilmot	153	7.1
Liberal Democrats	Timothy Lockington	92	4.3
Majority		89	4.1
Rejected ballots		6	
Total votes		2,166	
Turnout			37

=== Priory Heath ===
Priory Heath ward
Party	Candidate	Votes	%
Labour	Daniel Maguire	908	44.0
UKIP	Michael Chelk	546	26.4
Conservative	Andrew Shannon	490	23.7
Liberal Democrats	Mathew Baker	121	5.9
Majority		362	17.6
Rejected ballots		11	
Total votes		2,076	
Turnout			32

=== Rushmere ===
Rushmere
Party	Candidate	Votes	%
Labour	Sandra Gage	1,059	43.1
Conservative	Kingsley Garratt	645	26.2
UKIP	Alistair Pryke	536	21.8
Green	Max Phillips	136	5.5
Liberal Democrats	Gareth Jones	81	3.3
Majority		414	16.9
Rejected ballots		6	
Total votes		2,464	
Turnout			40

Sprites ward
Party	Candidate	Votes	%
Labour	Hamil Clarke	993	52.3
Conservative	Bob Hall	637	33.6
Green	Rory James	191	10.1
Liberal Democrats	Richard Dighton	77	4.1
Majority		356	18.7
Rejected ballots		12	
Total votes		1,909	
Turnout			36

St. John's ward
Party	Candidate	Votes	%
Labour	Elango Elavalakan	902	37.2
Conservative	Stephen Ion	622	25.7
UKIP	Alan Tirrell	565	23.3
Green	Barry Broom	229	9.5
Liberal Democrats	Robin Whitmore	103	4.3
Majority		280	11.5
Rejected ballots		8	
Total votes		2,430	
Turnout			37

St. Margaret's ward
Party	Candidate	Votes	%
Liberal Democrats	Inga Lockington	1,164	40.8
Conservative	Lee Reynolds	668	23.4
Labour	Steven Reynolds	528	18.5
UKIP	Andrew Iddon	316	11.1
Green	Kirsty Wilmot	177	6.2
Majority		496	17.4
Rejected ballots		7	
Total votes		2,861	
Turnout			46

Stoke Park ward
Party	Candidate	Votes	%
Conservative	Nadia Cenci	815	39.4
Labour	Howard Needham	625	30.2
UKIP	Alan Cotterell	515	24.9
Green	Sally Broom	75	3.6
Liberal Democrats	Ben Harvey	46	2.2
Majority		190	9.2
Rejected ballots		4	
Total votes		2,075	
Turnout			38

Westgate ward
Party	Candidate	Votes	%
Labour	Colin Kreidewolf	804	41.8
UKIP	Annie Crossley	446	23.2
Conservative	Paul Cawthorn	345	17.9
Green	John Mann	180	9.4
Liberal Democrats	Garath Jones	148	7.7
Majority		358	18.6
Rejected ballots		8	
Total votes		1,931	
Turnout			30

Whitehouse ward
Party	Candidate	Votes	%
Labour	Colin Wright	824	43.6
UKIP	James Crossley	646	34.2
Conservative	David Heffer	335	17.7
Liberal Democrats	Moira Kleissner	86	4.5
Majority		178	9.4
Rejected ballots		8	
Total votes		1,899	
Turnout			30

Whitton ward
Party	Candidate	Votes	%
Labour	Hugh Whittall	860	39.9
UKIP	Ricky Brownlee	669	31.1
Conservative	Erion Xhaferaj	539	25.0
Liberal Democrats	Nicholas Jacob	86	4.0
Majority		191	8.8
Rejected ballots		8	
Total votes		2,162	
Turnout			36
