= 2016 Ipswich Borough Council election =

2016 UK local government election

← 2015	5 May 2016	2018 →

17 seats (out of 48 seats) 25 seats needed for a majority
	First party	Second party	Third party
Party	Labour	Conservative	Liberal Democrats
Seats before	31	15	2
Seats won	13	3	1
Seats after	33	13	2
Seat change	▲2	▼2	Steady
Popular vote	14,203	10,049	2,831
Percentage	46.4%	32.8%	9.3%
- Map showing the 2016 local election results in Ipswich.
Council control before election
Labour
Council control after election
Labour

Elections to Ipswich Borough Council took place on 5 May 2016. This was on the same day as other local elections.

== Results summary ==
2016 Ipswich Borough Council election
Party	This election			Full council			This election		
Party	Seats	Net	Seats %	Other	Total	Total %	Votes	Votes %	+/−
Labour	13	▲2	81.3	20	33	68.8	14,654	46.2	
Conservative	2	▼2	12.5	11	13	27.1	10,797	34.1	
Liberal Democrats	1	Steady	6.3	1	2	4.2	2,731	8.6	
UKIP	0	Steady	0.0	0	0	0.0	2,018	6.4	
Green	0	Steady	0.0	0	0	0.0	1,497	4.7	

== Ward results ==
These are the results for all 16 wards.

=== Alexandra ===
Alexandra
Party	Candidate	Votes	%	±%
Labour Co-op	Adam Leeder	1,019	53.8	+8.4
Conservative	Chandima Perera	478	25.3	−8.1
Green	Barry Broom	219	11.6	−1.8
Liberal Democrats	Ken Toye	177	9.4	+1.6
Majority		541	28.5	
Turnout		1,893		
Labour Co-op hold		Swing		

=== Bixley ===
Bixley
Party	Candidate	Votes	%	±%
Conservative	John Carnall	1,142	51.2	−1.9
Labour	Paul Anderson	625	28.0	+4.2
UKIP	David Hurlbut	307	13.8	+1.0
Liberal Democrats	Colin Boyd	155	7.0	+2.7
Majority		517	23.2	
Turnout		2,229		
Conservative hold		Swing		

=== Bridge ===
Bridge
Party	Candidate	Votes	%	±%
Labour Co-op	Bryony Rudkin	887	59.3	+19.7
Conservative	Richard Dighton	419	28.0	−4.8
Green	Charlotte Armstrong	191	12.8	+6.9
Majority		468	29.3	
Turnout		1,597		
Labour Co-op hold		Swing		

=== Castle Hill ===
Castle Hill (2 seats due to by-election)
Party	Candidate	Votes	%	±%
Conservative	Ian Fisher	823	24.2	N/A
Conservative	Robin Vickery	748	22.0	N/A
Labour	Annabel Mednick	529	15.6	N/A
Labour	John Harris	451	13.3	N/A
UKIP	Pippa Gordon	420	12.4	N/A
Liberal Democrats	Malcolm Mitchell	230	6.8	N/A
Green	Liz Smith	196	5.8	N/A
Majority		219		
Turnout				
Conservative hold		Swing		
Conservative hold		Swing		

=== Gainsborough ===
Gainsborough
Party	Candidate	Votes	%	±%
Labour Co-op	Stephen Connelly	1,059	68.2	+26.0
Conservative	Quaid Combstock	494	31.8	0.0
Majority		565	36.4	
Turnout		1,553		
Labour Co-op hold		Swing		

=== Gipping ===
Gipping
Party	Candidate	Votes	%	±%
Labour	David Ellesmere	896	57.0	+13.6
Conservative	Kevin Algar	434	27.6	−1.8
Green	Shaun McDonald	144	9.2	+2.3
Liberal Democrats	Conrad Packwood	99	6.3	+2.3
Majority		462	29.4	
Turnout		1,573		
Labour hold		Swing		

=== Holywells ===
Holywells
Party	Candidate	Votes	%	±%
Labour	Barry Studd	827	43.1	+12.4
Conservative	Heather Mills	817	42.6	−2.1
Green	Tom Wilmot	142	7.4	+0.7
Liberal Democrats	Robert Chambers	131	6.8	+1.5
Majority		10	0.5	
Turnout		1,917		
Labour gain from Conservative		Swing		

=== Priory Heath ===
Priory Heath
Party	Candidate	Votes	%	±%
Labour	Sarah Barber	1,026	59.2	+17.0
Conservative	Andy Shannon	558	32.2	−2.3
Liberal Democrats	Paul Grange	148	8.6	+4.4
Majority		468	27.0	
Turnout		1,732		
Labour hold		Swing		

=== Rushmere ===
Rushmere
Party	Candidate	Votes	%	±%
Labour	Alasdair Ross	1,285	57.6	+19.8
Conservative	Paul Cawthorn	712	39.9	−8.0
Green	Maxwell Phillips	125	5.6	+1.0
Liberal Democrats	Nick Jacob	109	4.9	0.0
Majority		573	25.7	
Turnout		2,231		
Labour hold		Swing		

=== Sprites ===
Sprites
Party	Candidate	Votes	%	±%
Labour	Colin Smart	895	46.9	+10.2
Conservative	Bob Hall	603	31.6	+0.2
UKIP	Alan Cotterell	372	19.5	−2.2
Liberal Democrats	Gareth Jones	38	2.0	−2.0
Majority		292	15.3	
Turnout		1,908		
Labour gain from Conservative		Swing		

=== St. John's ===
St. John's
Party	Candidate	Votes	%	±%
Labour	Neil McDonald	1,261	57.4	+22.3
Conservative	Jose Esteves	660	30.1	−0.8
Green	Ned Harrison	173	7.9	−2.8
Liberal Democrats	Robin Whitmore	102	4.6	−2.1
Majority		601	27.3	
Turnout		2,196		
Labour hold		Swing		

=== St. Margaret's ===
St. Margaret's
Party	Candidate	Votes	%	±%
Liberal Democrats	Oliver Holmes	1,068	37.3	+4.5
Conservative	Steve Hardman	896	31.3	−6.2
Labour	Steven Reynolds	588	20.5	−1.1
UKIP	Andrew Iddon	178	6.2	New
Green	Kirsty Wilmot	133	4.6	−3.5
Majority		172	6.0	
Turnout		2,863	46.6	
Liberal Democrats hold		Swing		

=== Stoke Park ===
Stoke Park
Party	Candidate	Votes	%	±%
Labour Co-op	Tracy Grant	835	46.7	+8.2
Conservative	Ben Harvey	815	45.6	−4.6
Liberal Democrats	Trevor Powell	137	7.7	+3.3
Majority		20	1.1	
Turnout		1,787		
Labour Co-op hold		Swing		

=== Westgate ===
Westgate
Party	Candidate	Votes	%	±%
Labour	Carole Jones	865	57.2	+14.6
Conservative	Mark Felix-Thomas	330	21.8	−6.6
Liberal Democrats	Martin Hore	193	12.8	+7.5
Green	John Mann	124	8.2	+0.8
Majority		535	35.4	
Turnout		1,512		
Labour hold		Swing		

=== Whitehouse ===
Whitehouse
Party	Candidate	Votes	%	±%
Labour	Glen Chisholm	773	48.8	+13.7
UKIP	Eric Pearl	385	24.3	+2.5
Conservative	David Heffer	333	21.0	−13.5
Green	Anthony Dooley	50	3.2	−1.4
Liberal Democrats	Julie Fletcher	42	2.6	−1.3
Majority		388	24.5	
Turnout		1,583		
Labour hold		Swing		

=== Whitton ===
Whitton
Party	Candidate	Votes	%	±%
Labour	Sophie Meudec	833	45.6	+0.3
Conservative	John Downie	535	29.3	−17.2
UKIP	Tony Gould	356	19.5	New
Liberal Democrats	Moira Kleissner	102	5.6	−2.7
Majority		298	16.3	
Turnout		1,826		
Labour hold		Swing		
