= 2021 Ipswich Borough Council election =

2021 UK local government election

17 seats (out of 48 seats) 25 seats needed for a majority
	First party	Second party	Third party
Party	Labour	Conservative	Liberal Democrats
Seats before	36	9	3
Seats won	30	15	3
Seat change	▼6	▲6	Steady
Popular vote	16,078	18,397	3,270
Percentage	39.3%	45.0%	8.0%
- Map showing the results of the 2021 Ipswich Borough Council election
Council control before election
Labour
Council control after election
Labour

Elections to Ipswich Borough Council were held on 6 May 2021. The elections included the seats that were planned to be elected on 7 May 2020, but were postponed due to the COVID-19 pandemic. Usually 16 seats – one in each of the 16 wards – are contested at each election. However, due to the resignation of former Labour Councillor and Mayor Jan Parry in Holywells ward, as well as Conservative Councillor Robin Vickery in Castle Hill, two by-elections were held on the same day. Thus, 18 seats were up for election.

The Conservatives made significant gains. Winning Gainsborough, Holywells, Sprites, Stoke Park and Whitton from the Labour Party. In addition, the Conservatives won the Holywells by-election. Thus gaining 6 seats.

The Labour Party retained a small majority of 12 seats, down from 24.

== Results summary ==
The list candidates nominated were published on 8 April 2021. There were two by-elections carried out at the same time, making 18 in total. The results were made available on 7 May 2021.

2021 Ipswich Borough Council election
Party	This election				Full council			This election		
Party	Candidates	Seats	Net	Seats %	Other	Total	Total %	Votes	Votes %	+/−
Labour	{{{candidates}}}	8	▼6	44.0	22	30	54.6	16,078	39.3	-0.8
Conservative	{{{candidates}}}	9	▲6	50.0	6	15	29.1	18,397	45.0	+14.7
Liberal Democrats	{{{candidates}}}	1	Steady	6.0	2	3	6.3	3,270	8.0	-3.8
Green	{{{candidates}}}	0	Steady	0.0	0	0	0.0	3,381	8.3	-1.0
Burning Pink	{{{candidates}}}	0	Steady	0.0	0	0	0.0	78	0.2	New

== Ward results ==
=== Alexandra ===
Alexandra
Party	Candidate	Votes	%	±%
Labour	Adam Rae	1,266	47.6	−6.1
Conservative	Sachin Karale	889	33.4	+13.7
Green	Tom Wilmot	355	13.4	−4.3
Liberal Democrats	Gerald Pryke	149	5.6	−3.3
Majority		377	14.2	
Turnout		2,659	36.2	
Labour hold		Swing		

=== Bixley ===
Bixley
Party	Candidate	Votes	%	±%
Conservative	Lee Reynolds	1,639	61.3	+11.2
Labour	Paul Bones	667	24.9	−0.6
Green	Stephanie Cullen	249	9.3	−6.6
Liberal Democrats	Lisa Weichert	119	4.5	−4.0
Majority		972	36.4	
Turnout		2,674	47.1	
Conservative hold		Swing		

=== Bridge ===
Bridge
Party	Candidate	Votes	%	±%
Labour Co-op	Bryony Rudkin	895	44.9	+0.1
Conservative	Mike Scanes	771	38.6	+17.3
Green	Adria Pittock	235	11.8	−1.6
Liberal Democrats	Martine Hore	94	4.7	−0.6
Majority		124	6.3	
Turnout		1,995	30.6	
Labour Co-op hold		Swing		

=== Castle Hill ===
Castle Hill (2 seats up due to by-election)
Party	Candidate	Votes	%	±%
Conservative	Ian Fisher	1,331	58.7	+7.1
Conservative	Sam Murray	1,101	48.6	−3.0
Labour	Emily Bosley	785	34.6	+4.5
Labour	Kimberley Clements	596	26.3	−3.8
Liberal Democrats	Martine Pakes	258	11.4	−6.9
Green	Jayden Dodds	247	10.9	N/A
Liberal Democrats	Sophie Williams	217	9.6	−8.7
Turnout		2,268	40.2	
Conservative hold				
Conservative hold				

=== Gainsborough ===
Gainsborough
Party	Candidate	Votes	%	±%
Conservative	Shayne Pooley	1,066	49.0	+25.3
Labour Co-op	Stephen Connelly	908	41.8	−3.5
Green	Brieanna Patmore	143	6.6	+0.9
Liberal Democrats	Conrad Packwood	57	2.6	−0.6
Majority		158	7.2	N/A
Turnout		2,174	35.4	
Conservative gain from Labour Co-op		Swing		

=== Gipping ===
Gipping
Party	Candidate	Votes	%	±%
Labour	David Ellesmere	967	50.8	+2.7
Conservative	Mark Phillips	713	37.4	+15.0
Green	Lucy Williams	149	7.8	−0.5
Liberal Democrats	Lucy Drake	76	4.0	−3.3
Majority		254	13.4	
Turnout		1,905	30.4	
Labour hold		Swing		

=== Holywells ===
Holywells (2 seats up due to by-election)
Party	Candidate	Votes	%	±%
Conservative	Philipa Gordon	1,028	48.2	+3.3
Conservative	John Downie	965	45.3	+0.4
Labour	James Whatling	830	39.0	+3.1
Labour	Barry Studd	780	36.6	+0.7
Green	Jenny Rivett	466	13.1	−0.2
Liberal Democrats	Paul Daley	193	9.1	+3.2
Turnout		2,131	40.8	
Conservative gain from Labour				
Conservative gain from Labour				

=== Priory Heath ===
Priory Heath
Party	Candidate	Votes	%	±%
Labour Co-op	Sarah Barber	1,062	47.7	+0.9
Conservative	Andy Shannon	891	40.0	+12.8
Green	Andy Patmore	187	8.4	+0.7
Liberal Democrats	Nicholas Jacob	86	3.9	−1.6
Majority		171	7.7	
Turnout		2,226	33.8	
Labour Co-op hold		Swing		

=== Rushmere ===
Rushmere
Party	Candidate	Votes	%	±%
Labour	Alasdair Ross	1,208	44.9	+1.9
Conservative	Stephen Ion	1,159	43.0	+5.6
Green	Rachel Morris	200	7.4	−4.4
Liberal Democrats	Julie Fletcher	126	4.7	−3.1
Majority		49	1.9	
Turnout		2,693	43.6	
Labour hold		Swing		

=== Sprites ===
Sprites
Party	Candidate	Votes	%	±%
Conservative	Roy Flood	1,039	56.6	+28.4
Labour	Colin Smart	730	39.7	−9.1
Liberal Democrats	Malcolm Mitchell	68	3.7	−0.4
Majority		309	16.9	
Turnout		1,837	36.3	
Conservative gain from Labour		Swing		

=== St. John's ===
St. John's
Party	Candidate	Votes	%	±%
Labour Co-op	Neil MacDonald	1,300	47.9	−0.7
Conservative	Josh Owens	1,097	40.4	+18.0
Green	Jude Rook	200	7.4	−3.7
Liberal Democrats	Trevor Powell	116	4.3	−1.7
Majority		203	7.5	
Turnout		2,713	39.6	
Labour Co-op hold		Swing		

=== St. Margaret's ===
St. Margaret's
Party	Candidate	Votes	%	±%
Liberal Democrats	Oliver Holmes	1,427	42.0	−11.4
Conservative	Debbie Richards	977	28.7	+6.8
Labour	Stefan Long	722	21.2	+5.9
Green	Kirsty Wilmot	235	6.9	−2.5
Burning Pink	Sue Hagley	40	1.2	N/A
Majority		450	13.3	
Turnout		3,401	53.1	
Liberal Democrats hold		Swing		

=== Stoke Park ===
Stoke Park
Party	Candidate	Votes	%	±%
Conservative	Rhys Ellis	1,126	58.2	+18.5
Labour	Shane Spitty	569	29.4	−6.3
Green	Martin Hynes	124	6.4	0.0
Liberal Democrats	Adam Merritt	115	5.9	+1.7
Majority		557	28.8	
Turnout		1,934	36.7	
Conservative gain from Labour		Swing		

=== Westgate ===
Westgate
Party	Candidate	Votes	%	±%
Labour	Carole Jones	1,002	49.8	−0.8
Conservative	Katherine West	631	31.3	+12.4
Green	John Mann	173	8.6	−2.1
Liberal Democrats	Robin Whitmore	169	8.4	+0.1
Burning Pink	Jennifer McCarthy	38	1.9	N/A
Majority		371	18.5	
Turnout		2,013	31.3	
Labour hold		Swing		

=== Whitehouse ===
Whitehouse
Party	Candidate	Votes	%	±%
Labour Co-op	Tracy Grant	813	45.4	+3.1
Conservative	Stephen Lark	783	43.8	+22.7
Green	Edmund Harrison	193	10.8	+3.4
Majority		30	1.6	
Turnout		1,789	27.9	
Labour Co-op hold		Swing		

=== Whitton ===
Whitton
Party	Candidate	Votes	%	±%
Conservative	Tony Gould	1,191	54.9	+23.2
Labour Co-op	Sophie Meudec	978	45.1	+0.5
Majority		213	9.8	N/A
Turnout		2,169	36.4	
Conservative gain from Labour Co-op		Swing		
