= 2018 Ipswich Borough Council election =

2018 UK local government election

← 2016	3 May 2018	2019 →

17 seats (out of 48 seats) 25 seats needed for a majority
	First party	Second party	Third party
Party	Labour	Conservative	Liberal Democrats
Seats before	33	13	2
Seats won	34	12	2
Seat change	▲1	▼1	0
Popular vote	15,144	11,514	3,150
Percentage	48.5%	36.0%	10.0%
Swing	▲9.0%	▼4.9%	▲2.0%
- Map showing the 2018 local election results in Ipswich.
Council control before election
Labour
Council control after election
Labour

Elections to Ipswich Borough Council took place on 3 May 2018. This was on the same day as other local elections.

== Results summary ==
2018 Ipswich Borough Council election
Party	This election			Full council			This election		
Party	Seats	Net	Seats %	Other	Total	Total %	Votes	Votes %	+/−
Labour	12	▲1	75.0	22	34	70.8	15,144	48.4	+2.2
Conservative	3	▼1	18.8	9	12	25.0	11,514	36.8	+2.7
Liberal Democrats	1	Steady	6.3	1	2	4.2	3,151	10.1	+1.5
Green	0	Steady	0.0	0	0	0.0	1,036	3.3	-1.4
UKIP	0	Steady	0.0	0	0	0.0	437	1.4	-5.0
Independent	0	Steady	0.0	0	0	0.0	19	0.1	New

== Ward results ==
These are the results for all 16 wards.

=== Alexandra ===
Alexandra
Party	Candidate	Votes	%	±%
Labour Co-op	John Cook	1,245	59.8	
Conservative	Katherine West	499	24.0	−
Green	Tom Wilmot	190	9.1	
Liberal Democrats	Richard Thompson	147	7.1	
Majority		746		
Turnout		2,081	30.1	
Labour Co-op hold		Swing		

=== Bixley ===
Bixley
Party	Candidate	Votes	%	±%
Conservative	Edward Philips	1,264	59.1	
Labour	Paul Anderson	690	32.3	
Liberal Democrats	Trevor Powell	183	8.6	
Majority				
Turnout			37.43	
Conservative hold		Swing		

=== Bridge ===
Bridge
Party	Candidate	Votes	%	±%
Labour	Collette Allen	994	59.6	
Conservative	Murray Brunning	483	29.0	
Green	Charlotte Armstrong	124	7.4	
Liberal Democrats	Immo Weichert	66	4.0	
Majority		511		
Turnout			25.89	
Labour hold		Swing		

=== Castle Hill ===
Castle Hill
Party	Candidate	Votes	%	±%
Conservative	Robin Vickery	1,026	53.0	
Labour	Darren Heaps	694	35.8	
Liberal Democrats	Timothy Lockington	216	11.2	
Majority		332		
Turnout			33.64	
Conservative hold		Swing		

=== Gainsborough ===
Gainsborough
Party	Candidate	Votes	%	±%
Labour	Sheila Handley	987	54.1	
Conservative	Samantha Murray	557	30.5	
UKIP	Shayne Pooley	184	10.1	
Green	Benjamin Magrath	66	3.6	
Liberal Democrats	Robin Whitmore	32	1.8	
Majority		430		
Turnout			29.13	
Labour hold		Swing		

=== Gipping ===
Gipping
Party	Candidate	Votes	%	±%
Labour	Elizabeth Hughes	962	60.2	
Conservative	Mark Philips	504	31.5	
Liberal Democrats	Robert Chambers	133	8.3	
Majority		458		
Turnout			25.35	
Labour hold		Swing		

=== Holywells ===
Holywells
Party	Candidate	Votes	%	±%
Labour	Janice Parry	1,048	46.2	
Conservative	Heather Mills	1,003	44.3	
Green	Jennifer Rivett	137	6.0	
Liberal Democrats	Paul Daley	78	3.4	
Majority		45		
Turnout			39.07	
Labour gain from Conservative		Swing		

=== Priory Heath ===
Priory Heath
Party	Candidate	Votes	%	±%
Labour	Daniel Maguire	1,013	54.2	
Conservative	Andy Shannon	661	35.4	
Green	Andrew Patmore	99	5.3	
Liberal Democrats	Nicholas Jacob	96	5.1	
Majority		352		
Turnout			28.34	
Labour hold		Swing		

=== Rushmere ===
Rushmere
Party	Candidate	Votes	%	±%
Labour	Sandra Gage	1,283	57.0	
Conservative	Paul Cawthorn	809	36.0	
Liberal Democrats	Julie Fletcher	157	7.0	
Majority		474		
Turnout			36.49	
Labour hold		Swing		

=== Sprites ===
Sprites
Party	Candidate	Votes	%	±%
Labour	Helen Armitage	895	59	+10.2
Conservative	Michael Scanes	601	31.2	+0.2
UKIP	Alan Cotterell	109	8	−2.2
Liberal Democrats	Conrad Packwood	39	2.0	−2.0
Majority		294		
Turnout			32.05	
Labour hold		Swing		

=== St. John's ===
St. John's
Party	Candidate	Votes	%	±%
Labour	Elango Elavalakan	1,159	55.1	
Conservative	James Harding	690	32.8	
Liberal Democrats	Edward Packard	148	7.0	
Green	Ned Harrison	108	5.1	
Majority		469		
Turnout			32.2	
Labour hold		Swing		

=== St. Margaret's ===
St. Margaret's
Party	Candidate	Votes	%	±%
Liberal Democrats	Inga Lockington	1,493	50.4	
Conservative	Simon Fisher	734	24.8	
Labour	Jeremy Brown	615	20.7	
Green	Kirsty Wilmot	104	3.5	
Independent	David Tabane	19	0.6	New
Majority		759		
Turnout		2,965	45.7	
Liberal Democrats hold		Swing		

=== Stoke Park ===
Stoke Park
Party	Candidate	Votes	%	±%
Conservative	Nadia Cenci	991	53.5	
Labour	Kelvin Cracknell	726	39.2	
Green	Barry Broom	86	4.6	
Liberal Democrats	Maureen Haaker	49	2.6	
Majority				
Turnout			35.7	
Conservative hold		Swing		

=== Westgate ===
Westgate
Party	Candidate	Votes	%	±%
Labour	Colin Kreidewolf	999	57.2	
Conservative	Samuel Downer	472	27.0	
Liberal Democrats	Martin Hore	153	8.8	
Green	John Mann	122	7.0	
Majority		527		
Turnout			27.05	
Labour hold		Swing		

=== Whitehouse ===
Whitehouse
Party	Candidate	Votes	%	±%
Labour	Colin Wright	838	57.2	
Conservative	Stephen Lark	414	28.3	
UKIP	Tony Gould	144	9.8	
Liberal Democrats	Malcolm Mitchell	69	4.7	
Majority		424		
Turnout			23.55	
Labour hold		Swing		

=== Whitton ===
Whitton
Party	Candidate	Votes	%	±%
Labour	Christine Shaw	996	52.6	
Conservative	John Downie	806	42.6	
Liberal Democrats	Daniel Smith	92	4.9	
Majority		190	10.0	
Turnout			32.28	
Labour hold		Swing		
