= 2010 Ipswich Borough Council election =

2010 UK local government election

← 2008	6 May 2010	2011 →

16 of the 48 seats 25 seats needed for a majority
	First party	Second party	Third party
Party	Labour	Conservative	Liberal Democrats
Last election	21	19	8
Seats won	8	6	3
Seats after	23	18	7
Seat change	▲2	▼1	▼1
Popular vote	20,073	22,012	14,544
Percentage	34.9%	38.3%	25.3%
- Map showing the 2010 local election results in Ipswich.
Council control before election
No overall control
Council control after election
No overall control

Elections for Ipswich Borough Council were held on Thursday 6 May 2010. One third of the seats were up for election and the council remained under no overall control, with Labour as the largest party.

After the election, the composition of the council was:

- Labour 23
- Conservative 18
- Liberal Democrat 7

The Conservative-Liberal Democrat coalition, which had governed Ipswich since 2004, continued in office.

== Ward results ==
=== Alexandra ===
Alexandra
Party	Candidate	Votes	%
Liberal Democrats	Ken Bates	1,293	
Liberal Democrats	Nigel Cheeseman	1,271	
Labour	Julian Gibbs	1,150	
Labour	David Rowley	1,084	
Conservative	Oliver Hartley	899	
Conservative	Edward Phillips	828	
Turnout		6,525	
Liberal Democrats hold			
Liberal Democrats hold			

=== Bixley ===
Bixley
Party	Candidate	Votes	%
Conservative	Russell Harsant	2,241	54.7%
Liberal Democrats	Clive Witter	943	23.0%
Labour	Alex Mayer	912	22.3%
Majority		1,298	31.7%
Turnout		4,096	
Conservative hold			

=== Bridge ===
Bridge
Party	Candidate	Votes	%
Labour	James Powell	1,364	40.6%
Conservative	James Spencer	1,190	35.4%
Liberal Democrats	Ric Hardacre	631	18.8%
Green	Rick Deeks	175	5.2%
Majority		174	5.2%
Turnout		3,360	
Labour hold			

=== Castle Hill ===
Castle Hill
Party	Candidate	Votes	%
Conservative	Mary Young	1,927	47.8%
Labour	John Harris	1,053	26.1%
Liberal Democrats	Robert Chambers	849	21.1%
Green	Jenny Overett	200	5.0%
Majority		874	21.7%
Turnout			
Conservative hold			

=== Gainsborough ===
Gainsborough
Party	Candidate	Votes	%
Labour	Keith Rawlingson	1,618	46.6%
Conservative	Julie Mayes	1,150	33.1%
Liberal Democrats	Mat Baker	707	20.3%
Majority		468	13.5%
Turnout		3,475	
Labour hold			

=== Gipping ===
Gipping
Party	Candidate	Votes	%
Labour	Jeannette MacArtney	1,458	46.8%
Conservative	Steve Flood	980	31.5%
Liberal Democrats	Ann Groves	676	21.7%
Majority		478	15.3%
Turnout		3,114	
Labour hold			

=== Holywells ===
Holywells
Party	Candidate	Votes	%
Conservative	George Debman	1,528	44.3%
Liberal Democrats	David Jermy	999	29.0%
Labour	Bex Robinson	919	26.7%
Majority		529	15.3%
Turnout		3,446	
Conservative hold			

=== Priory Heath ===
Priory Heath
Party	Candidate	Votes	%
Labour	John Legrys	1,525	42.8%
Conservative	Kym Stroet	1,211	34.0%
Liberal Democrats	Nicholas Jacob	823	23.1%
Majority		314	8.8%
Turnout		3,559	
Labour hold			

=== Rushmere ===
Rushmere
Party	Candidate	Votes	%
Conservative	Denise Terry	1,702	41.1%
Labour	Lindsey Rawlingson	1,541	37.2%
Liberal Democrats	Robin Whitmore	896	21.6%
Majority		161	3.9%
Turnout		4,139	
Conservative hold			

=== Sprites ===
Sprites
Party	Candidate	Votes	%
Labour	Hamil Clarke	1,432	43.8%
Conservative	Bob Hall	1,347	41.2%
Liberal Democrats	Jamie Scott	492	15.0%
Majority		85	2.6%
Turnout		3,271	
Labour gain from Conservative			

=== St John's ===
St John's
Party	Candidate	Votes	%
Labour	Sandy Martin	1,700	40.1%
Conservative	Pam Kelly	1,564	36.9%
Liberal Democrats	Jill Atkins	974	23.0%
Majority		136	3.2%
Turnout		4,238	
Labour hold			

=== St Margaret's ===
St Margaret's
Party	Candidate	Votes	%
Liberal Democrats	Inga Lockington	2,101	48.6%
Conservative	Stephen Ion	1,420	32.9%
Labour	Liz Cooper	613	14.2%
Green	Amelia Drayson	186	4.3%
Majority		681	15.7%
Turnout		4,320	
Liberal Democrats hold			

=== Stoke Park ===
Stoke Park
Party	Candidate	Votes	%
Conservative	Nadia Cenci	1,386	42.3%
Labour	Barry Studd	1,089	33.2%
Liberal Democrats	Sarolta Lillywhite	485	14.8%
BNP	Dennis Boater	190	5.8%
Green	Barry Broom	128	3.9%
Majority		297	9.1%
Turnout		3,278	
Conservative hold			

=== Westgate ===
Westgate
Party	Candidate	Votes	%
Labour	Mary Blake	1,363	41.4%
Liberal Democrats	Timothy Lockington	1,005	30.5%
Conservative	Robert Brown	925	28.1%
Majority		358	10.9%
Turnout		3,293	
Labour hold			

=== Whitehouse ===
Whitehouse
Party	Candidate	Votes	%
Labour	David Ball	1,127	35.4%
Conservative	Paul Carter	1,125	35.3%
Liberal Democrats	Stephen Williams	931	29.2%
Majority		2	0.1%
Turnout		3,183	
Labour gain from Liberal Democrats			

=== Whitton ===
Whitton
Party	Candidate	Votes	%
Conservative	Christopher Stewart	1,417	42.1%
Labour	Stephen Connelly	1,129	33.6%
Liberal Democrats	Heidi Williams	819	24.3%
Majority		288	8.5%
Turnout		3,365	
Conservative gain from Labour			
