= 2003 Ipswich Borough Council election =

2003 UK local government election

- 1 May 2003

16 of the 48 seats 25 seats needed for a majority
	First party	Second party	Third party
Party	Labour	Conservative	Liberal Democrats
Last election	35	9	4
Seats won	7	6	3
Seats after	31	12	5
Seat change	▼4	▲3	▲1
Popular vote	9,272	11,171	7,368
Percentage	32.5%	39.2%	25.8%
Swing	▼8.6%	▲1.8%	▲5.1%
- Map showing the 2003 local election results in Ipswich.
Council control before election
Labour
Council control after election
Labour

Elections for Ipswich Borough Council were held on 1 May 2003. One third of the council was up for election and the Labour Party kept overall control of the council.

After the election, the composition of the council was:

- Labour 31
- Conservative 12
- Liberal Democrat 5

== Election result ==
Election apportionment diagram

2003 Ipswich local election result
Party	Seats	Gains	Losses	Net gain/loss	Seats %	Votes %	Votes	+/−
Labour	7	0	4	-4	43.8	32.5	9,272	-8.6
Conservative	6	3	0	+3	37.5	39.2	11,171	+1.8
Liberal Democrats	3	1	0	+1	18.8	25.8	7,368	+5.1
CPA	0	0	0	0	0.0	1.4	400	+0.8
Green	0	0	0	0	0.0	0.8	217	+0.6
Save Broomhill Pool	0	0	0	0	0.0	0.3	88	+0.3

== Ward results ==
=== Alexandra ===
Alexandra
Party	Candidate	Votes	%	±%
Liberal Democrats	Jane Chambers	807	42.9	
Labour	John Cook	649	34.5	
Conservative	Maureen Springle	321	17.0	
Green	Jane Scott	106	5.6	
Majority		158	8.4	
Turnout		1,883		
Liberal Democrats hold		Swing		

=== Bixley ===
Bixley
Party	Candidate	Votes	%	±%
Conservative	Stephen Barker	1,097	46.4	
Liberal Democrats	John Rivett	711	30.1	
Labour	Martyn Green	403	17.0	
CPA	Dave Cooper	155	6.6	
Majority		386	16.3	
Turnout		2,366		
Conservative hold		Swing		

=== Bridge ===
Bridge
Party	Candidate	Votes	%	±%
Labour	Philip Smart	611	43.1	
Conservative	Duncan Titchmarsh	491	34.7	
Liberal Democrats	Nicholas Jacob	315	22.2	
Majority		120	8.4	
Turnout		1,417		
Labour hold		Swing		

=== Castle Hill ===
Castle Hill
Party	Candidate	Votes	%	±%
Conservative	David Goldsmith	1,205	58.0	
Labour	James Adams	443	21.3	
Liberal Democrats	Dennis Day	431	20.7	
Majority		762	36.7	
Turnout		2,079		
Conservative hold		Swing		

=== Gainsborough ===
Gainsborough
Party	Candidate	Votes	%	±%
Labour	Don Edwards	712	45.8	
Conservative	Adam Ramsey	454	29.2	
Liberal Democrats	Catherine Chambers	304	19.6	
CPA	Jonathan Barnes	83	5.3	
Majority		258	16.6	
Turnout		1,553		
Labour hold		Swing		

=== Gipping ===
Gipping
Party	Candidate	Votes	%	±%
Labour	Peter Gardiner	652	44.5	
Conservative	Nadia Cenci	464	31.7	
Liberal Democrats	Charles Blue	348	23.8	
Majority		188	12.8	
Turnout		1,464		
Labour hold		Swing		

=== Holywells ===
Holywells
Party	Candidate	Votes	%	±%
Conservative	Elizabeth Harsant	882	55.1	
Labour	Robert Daines	429	26.8	
Liberal Democrats	Robin Whitmore	290	18.1	
Majority		453	28.3	
Turnout		1,601		
Conservative hold		Swing		

=== Priory Heath ===
Priory Heath
Party	Candidate	Votes	%	±%
Labour	Dali Jabbar	509	38.3	
Conservative	Sarah Dodwell	446	33.6	
Liberal Democrats	Catherine French	286	21.5	
Save Broomhill Pool	Sally Wainman	88	6.6	
Majority		63	4.7	
Turnout		1,329		
Labour hold		Swing		

=== Rushmere ===
Rushmere
Party	Candidate	Votes	%	±%
Conservative	Eileen Smith	991	43.2	
Labour	Richard Kirby	749	32.7	
Liberal Democrats	Roberta Kerslake	391	17.1	
CPA	Stephen Bloomfield	162	7.1	
Majority		242	10.5	
Turnout		2,293		
Conservative gain from Labour		Swing		

=== Sprites ===
Sprites
Party	Candidate	Votes	%	±%
Labour	John Le Grys	700	41.6	
Conservative	Robert Hall	693	41.2	
Liberal Democrats	Catherine Stafford	288	17.1	
Majority		7	0.4	
Turnout		1,681		
Labour hold		Swing		

=== St John's ===
St John's
Party	Candidate	Votes	%	±%
Labour	Neil MacDonald	778	39.2	
Conservative	Stephen Ion	684	34.4	
Liberal Democrats	Louise Gooch	413	20.8	
Green	Janet Phipps	111	5.6	
Majority		94	4.8	
Turnout		1,986		
Labour hold		Swing		

=== St Margaret's ===
St Margaret's
Party	Candidate	Votes	%	±%
Liberal Democrats	John Cooper	1,211	46.0	
Conservative	David Brown	1,079	41.0	
Labour	Jane Shaw	341	13.0	
Majority		132	5.0	
Turnout		2,631		
Liberal Democrats hold		Swing		

=== Stoke Park ===
Stoke Park
Party	Candidate	Votes	%	±%
Conservative	Stephen Cook	723	41.6	
Labour	Keith Rawlingson	635	36.5	
Liberal Democrats	Adrian Brown	380	21.9	
Majority		88	5.1	
Turnout		1,738		
Conservative gain from Labour		Swing		

=== Westgate ===
Westgate
Party	Candidate	Votes	%	±%
Labour	Martin Cook	568	40.8	
Conservative	Julie Schubert	467	33.5	
Liberal Democrats	Kenneth Toye	358	25.7	
Majority		101	7.3	
Turnout		1,393		
Labour hold		Swing		

=== Whitehouse ===
Whitehouse
Party	Candidate	Votes	%	±%
Liberal Democrats	George King	555	39.4	
Labour	Christopher Newbury	435	30.9	
Conservative	Colin Morgan	417	29.6	
Majority		120	8.5	
Turnout		1,407		
Liberal Democrats gain from Labour		Swing		

=== Whitton ===
Whitton
Party	Candidate	Votes	%	±%
Conservative	Sandra Doyle	757	44.7	
Labour	Carole Jones	658	38.8	
Liberal Democrats	Jill Atkins	280	16.5	
Majority		99	5.9	
Turnout		1,695		
Conservative gain from Labour		Swing		
