= 2007 Ipswich Borough Council election =

2007 UK local government election

← 2006	3 May 2007	2008 →

16 of the 48 seats 25 seats needed for a majority
	First party	Second party
Party	Conservative	Labour
Last election	19	18
Seats won	6	7
Seats after	20	18
Seat change	▲1	Steady
Popular vote	11,067	12,349
Percentage	35.6%	39.7%
Swing	▼0.1%	▲3.7%
	Third party	Fourth party
Party	Liberal Democrats	Independent
Last election	9	2
Seats won	3	0
Seats after	9	1
Seat change	Steady	▼1
Popular vote	6,470	310f
Percentage	20.8%	1.0%
Swing	▼4.7%	▲0.6%
- Map showing the 2007 local election results in Ipswich.
Council control before election
No overall control
Council control after election
No overall control

Elections for Ipswich Borough Council were held on 3 May 2007. One third of the council was up for election and the council stayed under no overall control.

After the election, the composition of the council was:

- Conservative 20
- Labour 18
- Liberal Democrat 9
- Independent 1

Following the election the Conservatives and Liberal Democrats continued to form the executive of the council.

== Election result ==
Ipswich local election result 2007
Party	Seats	Gains	Losses	Net gain/loss	Seats %	Votes %	Votes	+/−
Labour	7	1	1	0	43.8	39.7	12,349	+3.7
Conservative	6	0	0	0	37.5	35.6	11,067	-0.1
Liberal Democrats	3	1	1	0	18.8	20.8	6,470	-4.7
Green	0	0	0	0	0.0	2.7	851	+0.5
Independent	0	0	0	0	0.0	1.0	310	+0.6
UKIP	0	0	0	0	0.0	0.2	77	+0.2

== Ward results ==
=== Alexandra ===
Alexandra
Party	Candidate	Votes	%	±%
Liberal Democrats	Jane Chambers	756	40.8	+3.4
Labour	Albert Grant	531	28.7	−2.0
Conservative	Edward Phillips	377	20.4	−0.6
Green	John Taylor	188	10.2	−0.7
Majority		225	12.1	+5.4
Turnout		1,852	31.9	−1.5
Liberal Democrats hold		Swing		

=== Bixley ===
Bixley
Party	Candidate	Votes	%	±%
Conservative	Gavin Maclure	1,496	65.0	+2.2
Labour	Barry Studd	406	17.7	+2.5
Liberal Democrats	Clive Witter	398	17.3	−4.7
Majority		1,090	46.3	+5.5
Turnout		2,300	39.8	+0.6
Conservative hold		Swing		

=== Bridge ===
Bridge
Party	Candidate	Votes	%	±%
Labour	Philip Smart	762	45.5	−1.2
Conservative	Kevern Mulley	585	35.0	−0.7
Liberal Democrats	Christopher Newbury	193	11.5	−6.1
Green	Rick Deeks	133	7.9	+7.9
Majority		177	10.5	−0.5
Turnout		1,673	28.7	−0.6
Labour hold		Swing		

=== Castle Hill ===
Castle Hill
Party	Candidate	Votes	%	±%
Conservative	David Goldsmith	1,081	48.8	−10.9
Liberal Democrats	Nigel Cheeseman	502	22.7	+1.5
Labour	John Harris	425	19.2	+0.1
Independent	Sally Wainman	111	5.0	+5.0
Green	Jason White	96	4.3	+4.3
Majority		579	26.1	−12.4
Turnout		2,215	37.4	−2.3
Conservative hold		Swing		

=== Gainsborough ===
Gainsborough
Party	Candidate	Votes	%	±%
Labour	Don Edwards	925	54.0	+6.7
Conservative	Stephen Baldrey	523	30.5	−1.4
Liberal Democrats	Robin Whitmore	264	15.4	−0.5
Majority		402	23.5	+8.1
Turnout		1,712	27.9	−1.0
Labour hold		Swing		

=== Gipping ===
Gipping
Party	Candidate	Votes	%	±%
Labour	Peter Gardiner	824	52.3	+7.2
Conservative	Maureen Springle	477	30.3	−4.2
Liberal Democrats	Les Nicholls	274	17.4	−3.1
Majority		347	22.0	+11.4
Turnout		1,575	27.3	−0.6
Labour hold		Swing		

=== Holywells ===
Holywells
Party	Candidate	Votes	%	±%
Conservative	Liz Harsant	851	50.8	+3.5
Labour	Jamie McMahon	518	30.9	+8.8
Liberal Democrats	Kevin Walker	305	18.2	−12.4
Majority		333	19.9	+3.2
Turnout		1,674	33.5	−1.0
Conservative hold		Swing		

=== Priory Heath ===
Priory Heath
Party	Candidate	Votes	%	±%
Labour	William Knowles	852	45.4	+5.5
Conservative	Tanya De Hoedt	789	42.1	+6.6
Liberal Democrats	Nick Jacob	234	12.5	−5.0
Majority		63	3.3	−1.1
Turnout		1,875	31.7	+1.7
Labour hold		Swing		

=== Rushmere ===
Rushmere
Party	Candidate	Votes	%	±%
Conservative	Eileen Smith	1,014	43.1	+2.5
Labour	Alasdair Ross	905	38.5	+5.2
Liberal Democrats	Cathy French	269	11.4	−14.7
Green	Brenda Cavanagh	165	7.0	+7.0
Majority		109	4.6	−2.7
Turnout		2,353	39.0	−0.6
Conservative hold		Swing	-1.35	

=== Sprites ===
Sprites
Party	Candidate	Votes	%	±%
Labour	Roger Fern	1,035	50.6	+8.2
Conservative	Kathy Kenna	840	41.1	−5.6
Liberal Democrats	Oliver Holmes	171	8.4	−2.4
Majority		195	9.5	
Turnout		2,046	38.0	+1.7
Labour hold		Swing		

=== St John's ===
St John's
Party	Candidate	Votes	%	±%
Labour	Neil MacDonald	1,004	44.0	+4.8
Conservative	Pamela Kelly	915	40.1	+5.9
Liberal Democrats	Jill Atkins	362	15.9	−4.5
Majority		89	3.9	−1.1
Turnout		2,281	37.8	−2.1
Labour hold		Swing		

=== St Margaret's ===
St Margaret's
Party	Candidate	Votes	%	±%
Liberal Democrats	John Cooper	1,011	38.2	−12.2
Conservative	Sophie Stanbrook	968	36.5	+3.7
Labour	Steve Buckingham	289	10.9	+1.0
Independent	Leonard Woolf	199	7.5	+7.5
Green	Amy Drayson	183	6.9	−0.1
Majority		43	1.7	−15.9
Turnout		2,650	44.6	−2.8
Liberal Democrats hold		Swing		

=== Stoke Park ===
Stoke Park
Party	Candidate	Votes	%	±%
Conservative	Richard Pope	871	52.0	+4.4
Labour	Keith Rawlingson	610	36.4	−0.4
Liberal Democrats	Timothy Lockington	194	11.6	−4.0
Majority		261	15.6	+4.8
Turnout		1,675	30.2	−1.3
Conservative hold		Swing		

=== Westgate ===
Westgate
Party	Candidate	Votes	%	±%
Liberal Democrats	Andrew Cann	735	38.7	+4.0
Labour	Martin Cook	722	38.0	+2.2
Conservative	Ian Fisher	279	14.7	−7.6
Green	Colin Rodgers	86	4.5	−2.8
UKIP	Russell Metcalfe	77	4.1	+4.1
Majority		13	0.7	
Turnout		1,899	30.8	+0.4
Liberal Democrats gain from Labour		Swing		

=== Whitehouse ===
Whitehouse
Party	Candidate	Votes	%	±%
Labour	Anthony Lewis	563	38.1	+6.2
Liberal Democrats	Howard Stanley	512	34.7	−9.7
Conservative	Ben Matthews	401	27.2	+3.5
Majority		51	3.4	
Turnout		1,476	25.2	−4.5
Labour gain from Liberal Democrats		Swing		

=== Whitton ===
Whitton
Party	Candidate	Votes	%	±%
Conservative	Michelle Bevan-Margetts	882	47.2	−5.0
Labour	Susan Crocker	696	37.3	+2.9
Liberal Democrats	Heidi Williams	290	15.5	+2.1
Majority		186	9.9	−7.9
Turnout		1,868	31.6	−2.8
Conservative hold		Swing		
