= 2008 Ipswich Borough Council election =

2008 UK local government election

← 2007	1 May 2008	2010 →

16 of the 48 seats 25 seats needed for a majority
	First party	Second party	Third party
Party	Labour	Conservative	Liberal Democrats
Last election	18	20	9
Seats won	9	7	2
Seats after	21	19	8
Seat change	▲3	▼2	▼1
Popular vote	12,327	14,214	5,762
Percentage	36.0%	41.5%	16.8%
Swing	▲0.4 pp	▲1.8 pp	▼4.0 pp
- Map showing the 2008 local election results in Ipswich.
Council control before election
No overall control
Council control after election
No overall control

Elections for Ipswich Borough Council were held on Thursday 1 May 2008. One third of the seats were up for election. The Labour Party won enough seats to become the largest party gaining 3 seats (2 from Con 1 from Lib Dem). The Conservatives had been the largest party since the 2006 Ipswich Council election. The results came as a stark contrast which saw the Conservatives make significant gains from Labour across the country. Particular disappointments for the Conservatives came when they lost Rushmere and Bridge to Labour and narrowly failed to gain St Margaret's from the Liberal Democrats, while narrowly holding onto St John's by a mere 3 votes. Meanwhile, the Liberal Democrats lost Whitehouse.

After the election, the composition of the council was:

- Labour 21
- Conservative 19
- Liberal Democrat 8
- Independent 0

Despite the losses, the Conservative-Liberal Democrat coalition continued to run the Council with a reduced majority of 6 seats.

== Election result ==
Ipswich local election result 2008
Party	Seats	Gains	Losses	Net gain/loss	Seats %	Votes %	Votes	+/−
Labour	9	3	0	+3	50.00	34.1	12,327	+0.4
Conservative	7	0	2	-2	38.9	41.1	14,214	+1.8
Liberal Democrats	2	0	1	-1	11.1	18.6	5,762	-4.0
Green	0	0	0	0	0.0	4.5	1,388	+1.4
UKIP	0	0	0	0	0.0	1.2	353	+0.8
Independent	0	0	0	0	0.0	0.6	174	-0.5

== Ward results ==
=== Alexandra ===
Alexandra
Party	Candidate	Votes	%	±%
Liberal Democrats	Louise Gooch	681	37.7	−3.1
Labour	Martin Goonan	508	28.1	−0.6
Conservative	Janice Rawlings	408	22.6	+2.2
Green	Brenda Cavanagh	211	11.7	+1.5
Majority		173	9.6	−2.5
Turnout		1808	30.6	−1.3
Liberal Democrats hold		Swing	+1.3	

=== Bixley ===
Bixley
Party	Candidate	Votes	%	±%
Conservative	John Carnall & Russell Harsant	2,839	64.8	−0.2
Labour	Lindsey Rawlingson & Emma Stock	691	15.8	−1.9
Liberal Democrats	Alison Williams & Clive Witter	614	14.0	−3.3
Green	Adrian Hedges	235	5.4	+5.4
Majority		1,148	49.0	+2.7
Turnout		4,379	38.6	−1.2
Conservative hold		Swing	+0.9	

=== Bridge ===
Bridge
Party	Candidate	Votes	%	±%
Labour	Bryony Rudkin	762	43.1	−2.4
Conservative	James Spencer	658	37.7	+2.7
Liberal Democrats	Christopher Newbury	179	10.3	−1.2
Green	Rick Deeks	157	9.0	+1.1
Majority		94	5.4	−5.1
Turnout		1,746	29.3	+0.6
Labour gain from		Swing	-2.6	

=== Castle Hill ===
Castle Hill
Party	Candidate	Votes	%	±%
Conservative	Robin Vickery	1,249	63.2	+14.4
Labour	John Harris	308	15.6	−3.6
Liberal Democrats	Nigel Cheeseman	298	15.1	−7.6
Green	Jenny Overett	120	6.1	+1.8
Majority		941	47.6	+21.5
Turnout		1,975	34.9	+8.8
Conservative hold		Swing	+9.0	

=== Gainsborough ===
Gainsborough
Party	Candidate	Votes	%	±%
Labour	John Mowles & Martin Cook	1,608	50.0	−4.0
Conservative	Kathleen Kenna & Janet Sibley	1174	36.5	+6.0
Liberal Democrats	Sally Scott & Jamie Scott	264	13.5	−1.9
Majority		434	13.5	−10
Turnout		3218	28.9	+1.0
Labour hold		Swing	-5.0	

=== Gipping ===
Gipping
Party	Candidate	Votes	%	±%
Labour	David Ellesmere	746	49.1	−3.2
Conservative	Maureen Springle	549	36.1	+5.8
Green	Tony Slade	225	14.8	
Majority		197	13.0	−9.0
Turnout		1,520	26.1	−1.2
Labour hold		Swing	-4.5	

=== Holywells ===
Holywells
Party	Candidate	Votes	%	±%
Conservative	David Hale	851	49.7	−1.1
Labour	Kenneth Douglas	457	28.4	−2.5
Liberal Democrats	Robert Chambers	347	21.9	+3.7
Majority		337	21.3	+1.4
Turnout		1,586	30.8	−2.7
Conservative hold		Swing	+0.7	

=== Priory Heath ===
Priory Heath
Party	Candidate	Votes	%	±%
Labour	William Quinton	881	46.9	+1.5
Conservative	Eddy Phillips	789	36.8	−5.3
Liberal Democrats	Nick Jacob	169	9.0	−3.5
Independent	Sally Wainman	137	7.3	
Majority		189	10.1	+6.8
Turnout		1,879	30.5	−1.2
Labour hold		Swing	+3.4	

=== Rushmere ===
Rushmere
Party	Candidate	Votes	%	±%
Labour	Alasdair Ross	1,026	44.0	+5.2
Conservative	Paul Carter	1,013	43.4	+0.3
Liberal Democrats	Leslie Nicholls	294	12.6	+1.2
Majority		13	0.6	
Turnout		2,333	39.0	
Labour gain from Conservative		Swing	+2.6	

=== Sprites ===
Sprites
Party	Candidate	Votes	%	±%
Labour	Richard Kirby	924	48.7	−1.9
Conservative	Medlin Spencer	769	40.5	−0.6
Liberal Democrats	Heidi Williams	205	10.8	+2.4
Majority		155	8.2	−1.3
Turnout		1,898	35.6	+1.7
Labour hold		Swing	-0.7	

=== St John's ===
St John's
Party	Candidate	Votes	%	±%
Conservative	Tanya De Hoedt	848	37.3	−2.8
Labour	Hamil Clarke	845	37.2	−6.8
Liberal Democrats	Jill Atkins	269	11.8	−4.1
Green	Steven Pritchard	156	6.9	
UKIP	Bill Vinyard	154	6.8	
Majority		3	0.1	
Turnout		2,272	36.6	−1.2
Conservative hold		Swing	+2.0	

=== St Margaret's ===
St Margaret's
Party	Candidate	Votes	%	±%
Liberal Democrats	Richard Atkins	1,134	41.7	+3.5
Conservative	Mary Young	1,089	40.0	+3.5
Labour	Elizabeth Cooper	304	11.2	+0.3
Green	Amy Drayson	183	7.2	+0.3
Majority		45	1.7	0.0
Turnout		2,722	46.1	+1.5
Liberal Democrats hold		Swing	0.0	

=== Stoke Park ===
Stoke Park
Party	Candidate	Votes	%	±%
Conservative	Paul West	907		
Labour	Barry Studd	472		
Liberal Democrats	Tim Lockington	202		
Majority				
Turnout			28.95	
Conservative hold		Swing		

=== Westgate ===
Westgate
Party	Candidate	Votes	%	±%
Labour	Carole Jones	748		
Liberal Democrats	Robin Whitmore	581		
Conservative	Ian Fisher	338		
Green	Colin Rodgers	89		
Independent	Russell Metcalfe	37		
Majority				
Turnout			29.21	
Labour hold		Swing		

=== Whitehouse ===
Whitehouse
Party	Candidate	Votes	%	±%
Labour	Albert Grant	584		
Liberal Democrats	Tony James	503		
Conservative	Ben Matthews	339		
UKIP	John West	199		
Majority				
Turnout			26.47	
Labour gain from Liberal Democrats		Swing		

=== Whitton ===
Whitton
Party	Candidate	Votes	%	±%
Conservative	Don Ward	918		
Labour	Sue Crocker	635		
Liberal Democrats	Jonathan Lockington	244		
Majority				
Turnout			30.60	
Conservative hold		Swing		
