= Ipswich Borough Council =

English local authority

Type
- Type: Non-metropolitan district

Leadership
- Mayor: Pat Bruce-Browne, Labour since 27 May 2026
- Leader: Neil MacDonald, Labour since 17 May 2023
- Chief Executive: Helen Pluck since January 2023

Structure
- Seats: 48 seats
- Political groups: Administration (29) Labour (29) Other Parties (19) Reform UK (10) Conservative (5) Liberal Democrats (3) Green (1)

Elections
- Last election: 7 May 2026

Meeting place
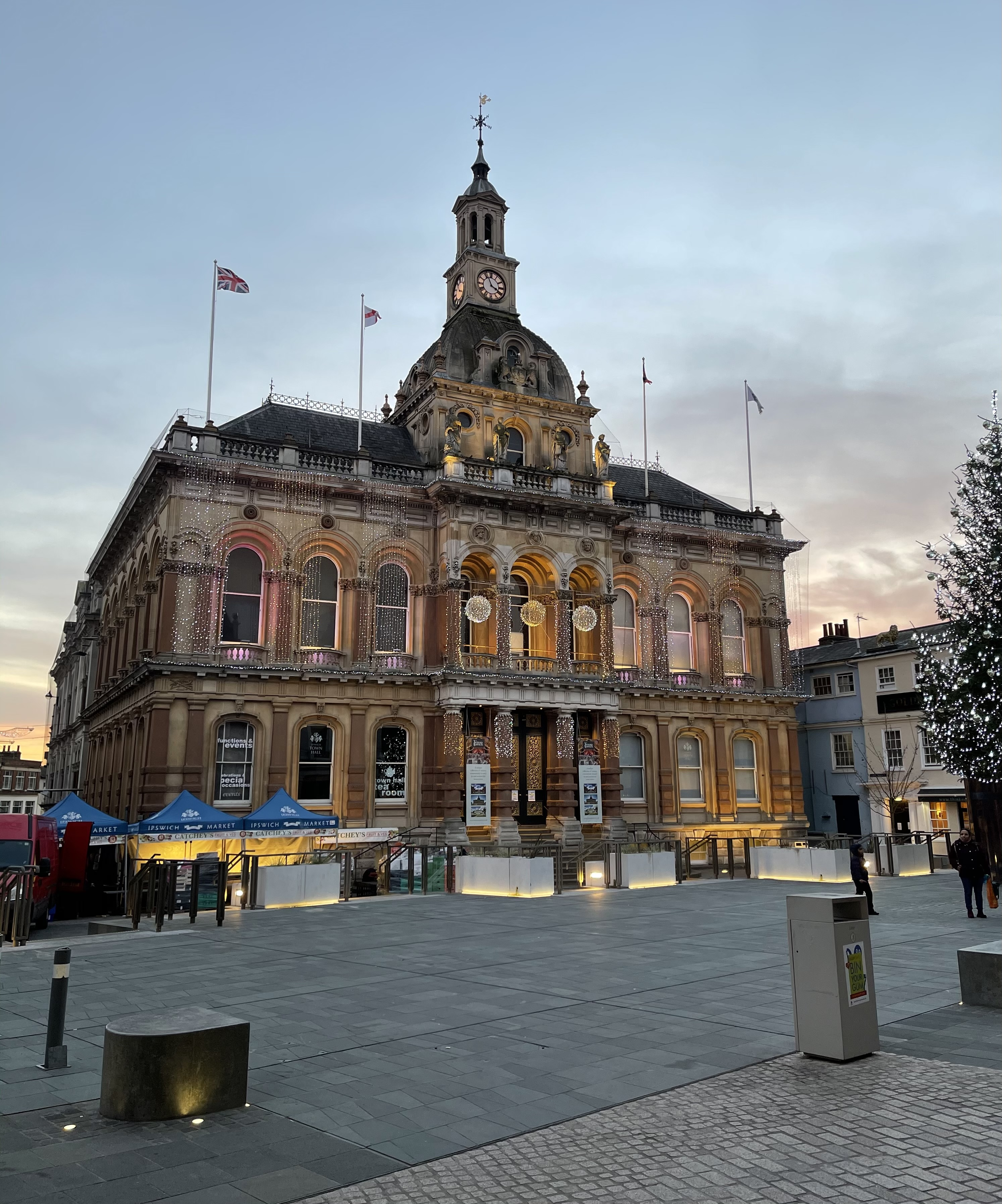
- Town Hall, Cornhill, Ipswich, IP1 1DH

Website
- www.ipswich.gov.uk

Ipswich Borough Council is the local authority for Ipswich, a non-metropolitan district with borough status in Suffolk, England. It is the second tier of a two-tier system, fulfilling functions such as refuse collection, housing and planning, with Suffolk County Council providing county council services such as transport, education and social services.

The council has been under Labour majority control since 2011. It meets at Ipswich Town Hall and has its main offices at Grafton House.

== History ==
Ipswich was an ancient borough. In the Domesday Book of 1086 it was described as having burgesses, implying some form of borough status. The town's first known charter was issued by King John in 1200.

The borough was reformed to become a municipal borough in 1836 under the Municipal Corporations Act 1835, which reorganised many boroughs across the country to a standardised model. It was then governed by a body formally called the "mayor, aldermen and burgesses of the borough of Ipswich", also known variously as the corporation, town council or borough council. When elected county councils were established in 1889, Ipswich was considered large enough to provide its own county-level services, and so it was made a county borough, independent from the surrounding East Suffolk County Council.

The borough was reconstituted as a non-metropolitan district on 1 April 1974 under the Local Government Act 1972, becoming a lower-tier district authority with the new Suffolk County Council providing county-level functions. Ipswich kept the same boundaries at the time of the 1974 reforms and also retained its borough status, allowing the chair of the council to take the title of mayor, continuing Ipswich's series of mayors dating back to 1836.

In 2007 the borough council bid to become a unitary authority, which would see it regain its independence from the county council. The proposal was considered by the government, but was ultimately rejected. Alternative options were then considered for introducing unitary authorities more generally across Suffolk, with a "North Haven" unitary authority covering Ipswich, Felixstowe and surrounding areas being the proposal recommended by the Boundary Committee in 2008. The new government which formed following the 2010 general election decided not to proceed with creating any unitary authorities in Suffolk.

In March 2026, the government announced plans to abolish the borough in 2028 as part of local government reorganisation across Suffolk. These proposals were withdrawn in September 2026.

== Governance ==
Ipswich Borough Council provides district-level services. County-level services are provided by Suffolk County Council. There are no civil parishes in Ipswich; the entire borough is an unparished area.

The council has divided the borough into five areas which each have their own committee and funding.

- Central Area: Alexandra Ward, St Margaret’s Ward and Westgate Ward
- North East Area: Bixley Ward, Rushmere Ward and St John’s Ward
- North West Area: Castle Hill Ward, Whitehouse Ward and Whitton Ward
- South East Area: Gainsborough Ward, Holywells Ward and Priory Heath Ward
- South West Area: Bridge Ward, Gipping Ward, Sprites Ward and Stoke Park Ward

=== Political control ===
The council has been under Labour majority control since 2011.

Political control of the council since the 1974 reforms took effect has been as follows:

Party in control	Years
Labour	1974–1976
Conservative	1976–1979
Labour	1979–2004
No overall control	2004–2011
Labour	2011–present

=== Leadership ===
The role of mayor is largely ceremonial in Ipswich. Political leadership is instead provided by the leader of the council. The leaders since 1997 have been:

Councillor	Party	From	To
Peter Gardiner	Labour	1997	15 Sep 2004
Dale Jackson	Conservative	15 Sep 2004	30 Mar 2005
Liz Harsant	Conservative	30 Mar 2005	May 2011
David Ellesmere	Labour	18 May 2011	17 May 2023
Neil MacDonald	Labour	17 May 2023	

=== Composition ===
Following the 2026 election the composition of the council was:

Party	Councillors
Labour	29
Reform	10
Conservative	5
Liberal Democrats	3
Green	1
Total	48

== Premises ==
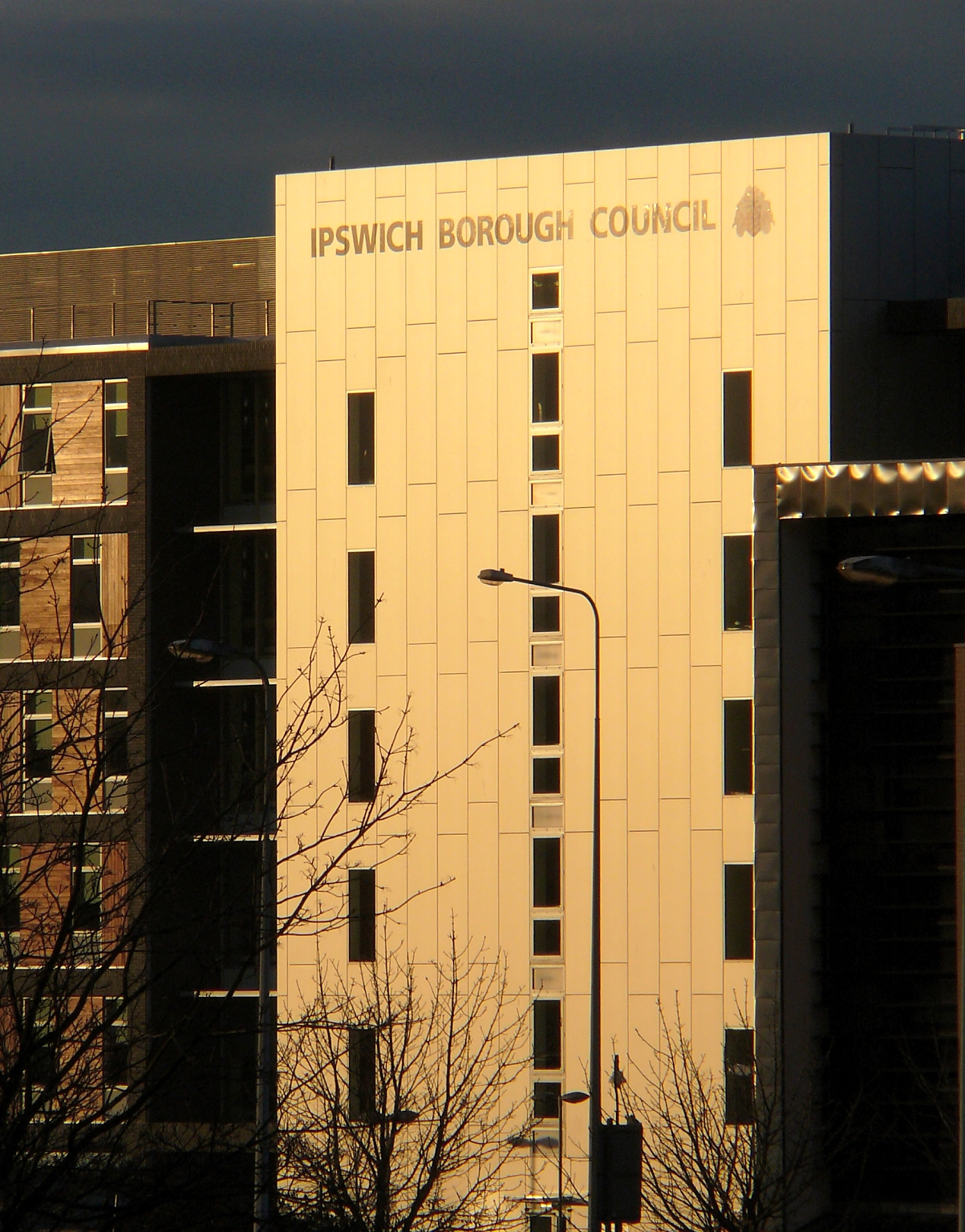
Grafton House, 15-17 Russell Road, Ipswich, IP1 2DE: Council's main offices since 2006

Full council meetings are generally held at Ipswich Town Hall on Cornhill. The building had been completed in 1868 for the old corporation.

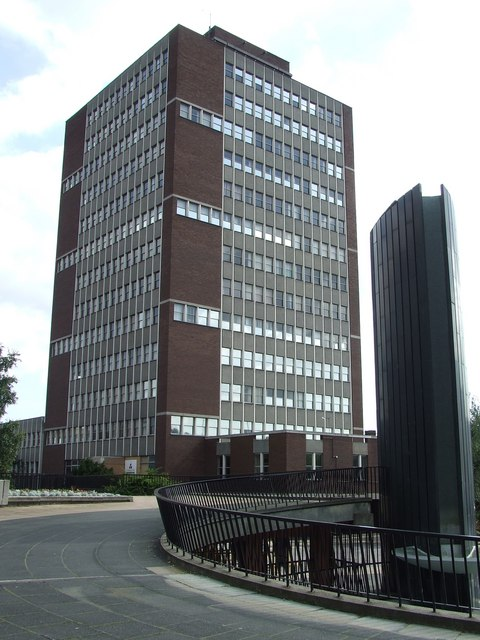
Civic Centre: Council's main offices 1970–2006, since demolished.

Since 2006 the council's main offices have been at Grafton House, a modern office building on Russell Road. Prior to 2006 the council met at the Town Hall and had its main offices at the Civic Centre on Civic Drive, a 14-storey tower block completed in 1970. The Civic Centre has since been demolished.

== Elections ==
Since the last boundary changes in 2002 the council has comprised 48 councillors representing 16 wards, with each ward electing three councillors. Elections are held three years out of every four, with a third of the council (one councillor for each ward) being elected each time for a four-year term of office. Suffolk County Council elections are held in the fourth year of the cycle when there are no borough council elections.

The borough is covered by two parliamentary constituencies: Ipswich, which covers about 75% and is represented by labour MP Jack Abbott Central Suffolk & North Ipswich, which covers the remaining 25% and is represented by Labour MP Dan Poulter.

=== Wards ===
The Councillors representing the different wards are:

Ipswich Borough Council Wards
Name	Area	Middle Layer Super Output Area	Councillors, May 2024 (date elected)		
Alexandra	Central	Ipswich 007	Adam Rae (2024)	John Cook (2022)	Jane Riley (2023)
Bixley	North East	Ipswich 009	Lee Reynolds (2024)	Edward Phillips (2022)	Richard Pope (2023)
Bridge	South West	Ipswich 012	Bryony Rudkin (2024)	Stephen Connolly (2022)	Philip Smart (2023)
Castle Hill	North West	Ipswich 002	Ian Fisher (2024)	Sam Murray (2022)	Erion Xhaferaj (2023)
Gainsborough	South East	Ipswich 016	James Whatling (2024)	Lynne Mortimer (2022)	Martin Cook (2023)
Gipping	South West	Ipswich 010	David Ellesmere (2024)	Elizabeth Hughes (2022)	Peter Gardiner (2023)
Holywells	South East	Ipswich 011	Nic El-Safty(2024)	George Lankester (2022)	Cathy Frost (2023)
Priory Heath	South East	Ipswich 014	Roxanne Downes (2024)	Owen Bartholomew(2024)	Ruman Muhith (2023)
Rushmere	North East	Ipswich 004	Alasdair Ross (2024)	Stefan Long (2022)	Kelvin Cracknell (2023)
St John's	North East	Ipswich 008	Neil MacDonald (2024)	Corinna Hudson (2024)	Kanthasamy Elavalakan (2023)
St Margaret's	Central	Ipswich 005	Oliver Holmes (2024)	Inga Lockington (2022)	Timothy Lockington (2023)
Sprites	South West	Ipswich 013	Philip McSweeney (2024)	Colin Smart (2022)	Jennifer Smith (2023)
Stoke Park	South West	Ipswich 015	Chu Mann (2024)	Tony Blacker (2022)	Nathan Wilson (2023)
Westgate	Central	Ipswich 006	Carole Jones (2024)	Colin Kreidewolf (2022)	Julian Gibbs (2023)
Whitehouse	North West	Ipswich 003	Tracy Grant(2024)	Colin Wright (2022)	Lucinda Trenchard (2023)
Whitton	North West	Ipswich 001	Pat Bruce-Browne (2024)	Christine Shaw (2022)	Gary Forster (2023)

== Heritage assets ==
Ipswich Borough Council owns a substantial number of artworks which have been curated by the Colchester and Ipswich Museums Service since 2007.

== Arms ==
Coat of arms of Ipswich Borough Council

Notes
Granted 29 August 1561.
Crest
On a wreath Or and Gules a demi lion Or supporting a ship Sable.
Escutcheon
Per pale Gules and Azure in the first a lion rampant Gold armed and langued Azure in the second three demi boats of the third.
Supporters
Two horses of the sea commonly called Neptune's horses maned and fined Gold.
