= 2024 Ipswich Borough Council election =

2024 English local elections

← 2023	2 May 2024	2026 →

18 out of 48 seats to Ipswich Borough Council 25 seats needed for a majority
- Turnout: 34,245

	First party	Second party
Leader	Neil MacDonald	Ian Fisher
Party	Labour	Conservative
Last election	33 seats, 43.0%	10 seats, 34.2%
Seats before	33 (Note: Including two vacant seats in Priory Heath and St John's wards last held by Labour.)	8
Seats won	5	2
Seats after	38	7
Seat change	▲5	▼3
Popular vote	15,971	10,095
Percentage	46.6%	29.5%
Swing	▲3.6%	▼4.7%
	Third party	Fourth party
Leader	Oliver Holmes
Party	Liberal Democrats	Independent
Last election	3 seats, 11.7%	2 seats, 0.0%
Seats before	3	3
Seats won	1
Seats after	3	0
Seat change	Steady	▼2
Popular vote	3,400	80
Percentage	5.6%	0.2%
Swing	▼1.8%	N/A
- Winner of each seat at the 2024 Ipswich Borough Council election
Leader before election
Neil MacDonald
Labour
Leader after election
Neil MacDonald
Labour

The 2024 Ipswich Borough Council election took place on 2 May 2024 to elect members of Ipswich Borough Council in Suffolk, England. This was on the same day as other local elections.

There were 18 seats were up for election, 16 being the usual third of the council (last elected in 2021) and two being by-elections.

Labour made five gains, increasing their majority on the council.

== Summary ==
=== Election result ===
2024 Ipswich Borough Council election
Party	This election			Full council			This election		
Party	Seats	Net	Seats %	Other	Total	Total %	Votes	Votes %	+/−
Labour	15	▲5	83.3	23	38	79.2	15,971	46.6	+3.6
Conservative	2	▼3	11.1	5	7	14.6	10,095	29.5	-4.7
Liberal Democrats	1	Steady	5.6	2	3	6.2	3,400	9.9	-1.8
Green	0	Steady	0.0	0	0	0.0	3,685	10.8	+0.1
Reform UK	0	Steady	0.0	0	0	0.0	1,014	3.0	+2.8
Independent	0	▼2	0.0	0	0	0.0	80	0.2	-0.2

== Ward results ==
The Statement of Persons Nominated, which detailed the candidates standing in each ward, was released by Ipswich Borough Council following the close of nominations on 5 April 2024.

=== Alexandra ===
Alexandra
Party	Candidate	Votes	%	±%
Labour	Adam Rae*	1,125	50.0	+8.7
Green	David Plowman	599	26.6	+2.6
Conservative	Katherine West	401	17.8	–12.5
Liberal Democrats	Kelly Turner	123	5.5	+1.1
Majority		526	23.4	+12.4
Turnout		2,266	29.1	–3.6
Registered electors		7,780		
Labour hold		Swing	▲3.1	

=== Bixley ===
Bixley
Party	Candidate	Votes	%	±%
Conservative	Lee Reynolds*	1,053	47.6	–2.3
Labour	Paul Anderson	788	35.6	+2.5
Green	Stephanie Cullen	239	10.8	+0.9
Liberal Democrats	Lisa Weichert	132	6.0	–0.8
Majority		265	12.0	–5.0
Turnout		2,231	38.7	–3.7
Registered electors		5,762		
Conservative hold		Swing	▼2.4	

=== Bridge ===
Bridge
Party	Candidate	Votes	%	±%
Labour Co-op	Bryony Rudkin*	780	46.2	–4.2
Conservative	John Downie	450	26.7	–3.5
Reform UK	Catherine Kersey	184	10.9	N/A
Green	Adria Pittock	166	9.8	–4.1
Liberal Democrats	Sophie Williams	108	6.4	+0.8
Majority		330	19.5	–0.7
Turnout		1,698	25.4	–0.1
Registered electors		6,681		
Labour hold		Swing	▼0.4	

=== Castle Hill ===
Castle Hill
Party	Candidate	Votes	%	±%
Conservative	Ian Fisher*	827	40.0	+1.6
Labour	Kim Cook	750	36.3	+5.0
Liberal Democrats	Martin Pakes	345	16.7	–5.4
Green	Richard Foster	143	6.9	–1.4
Majority		77	3.7	–3.4
Turnout		2,076	36.1	+1.0
Registered electors		5,756		
Conservative hold		Swing	▼1.7	

=== Gainsborough ===
Gainsborough
Party	Candidate	Votes	%	±%
Labour	James Whatling	764	47.7	–6.5
Conservative	Albert Demaj	411	25.7	–7.8
Reform UK	John Beard	186	11.6	N/A
Green	Robert Young	100	6.2	–2.1
Independent	Shayne Pooley*	80	5.0	N/A
Liberal Democrats	Amy Bendall	60	3.7	–0.3
Majority		353	22.0	+1.4
Turnout		1,613	26.0	–3.4
Registered electors		6,208		
Labour gain from Independent		Swing	▲0.7	

=== Gipping ===
Gipping
Party	Candidate	Votes	%	±%
Labour	David Ellesmere*	878	55.8	+0.9
Conservative	Rhys Ellis	442	28.1	+0.4
Green	Lee Morris	159	10.1	–2.1
Liberal Democrats	Gerald Pryke	95	6.0	+0.8
Majority		436	27.7	+0.7
Turnout		1,586	24.5	–0.7
Registered electors		6,472		
Labour hold		Swing	▲0.3	

=== Holywells ===
Holywells
Party	Candidate	Votes	%	±%
Labour	Nic El-Safty	1,041	49.2	+2.8
Conservative	Pippa Gordon-Gould*	704	33.3	–7.3
Green	Rory Richardson-Todd	205	9.7	+2.1
Liberal Democrats	Robert Chambers	165	7.8	+2.4
Majority		337	15.9	+10.2
Turnout		2,124	36.0	–2.8
Registered electors		5,903		
Labour gain from Conservative		Swing	▲5.1	

=== Priory Heath ===
Priory Heath (2 seats due to by-election)
Party	Candidate	Votes	%	±%
Labour	Roxanne Downes*	909	53.1	+6.7
Labour	Owen Batholomew	805	47.0	+0.6
Conservative	Robert Hall	485	28.3	–12.3
Conservative	Michael Scanes	431	25.2	–15.4
Green	Andy Patmore	195	11.4	+3.8
Green	Tom Wilmot	188	11.0	+3.4
Liberal Democrats	Conrad Packwood	101	5.9	+0.5
Turnout		1,711	25.5	–2.5
Registered electors		6,712		
Labour hold				
Labour hold				

=== Rushmere ===
Rushmere
Party	Candidate	Votes	%	±%
Labour	Alasdair Ross*	1,163	49.6	+2.1
Conservative	Debbie Richards	626	26.7	–7.2
Green	Rachel Morris	221	9.4	–0.6
Reform UK	Timothy Hawke	188	8.0	N/A
Liberal Democrats	Lucy Drake	146	6.2	–2.3
Majority		537	22.9	+9.4
Turnout		2,356	38.2	±0.0
Registered electors		6,171		
Labour hold		Swing	▲4.7	

=== Sprites ===
Sprites
Party	Candidate	Votes	%	±%
Labour	Philip McSweeney	769	48.8	+1.9
Conservative	Sian Gubb	618	39.2	+1.5
Green	Martin Hynes	124	7.9	+2.0
Liberal Democrats	Robin Whitmore	64	4.1	+1.8
Majority		151	9.6	+0.4
Turnout		1,575	31.0	–1.4
Registered electors		5,080		
Labour gain from Conservative		Swing	▲0.2	

=== St John's ===
St John's (2 seats due to by-election)
Party	Candidate	Votes	%	±%
Labour	Corinna Hudson	1,172	50.9	+5.1
Labour	Neil MacDonald*	1,162	50.4	+4.6
Conservative	Tim Buttle	698	30.3	–1.4
Conservative	Stephen Ion	542	23.5	–8.2
Green	Jude Rook	333	14.5	+5.0
Liberal Democrats	Giles Turner	273	11.8	–1.2
Turnout		2,304	32.8	–0.8
Registered electors		7,029		
Labour hold				
Labour hold				

=== St Margaret's ===
St Margaret's
Party	Candidate	Votes	%	±%
Liberal Democrats	Oliver Holmes*	1,431	51.0	–2.3
Labour	Sheila Handley	559	19.9	+3.3
Conservative	Laura Allenby	477	17.0	–4.4
Green	Kirsty Wilmot	341	12.1	+3.3
Majority		872	31.1	–0.7
Turnout		2,828	43.6	–2.1
Registered electors		6,482		
Liberal Democrats hold		Swing	▼2.8	

=== Stoke Park ===
Stoke Park
Party	Candidate	Votes	%	±%
Labour	Chu Man	765	44.6	+4.2
Conservative	James Harding	702	40.9	–5.3
Green	Barry Broom	172	10.0	+2.7
Liberal Democrats	Henry Williams	76	4.4	+0.2
Majority		63	3.7	N/A
Turnout		1,727	33.5	–0.9
Registered electors		5,160		
Labour gain from Conservative		Swing	▲4.8	

=== Westgate ===
Westgate
Party	Candidate	Votes	%	±%
Labour	Carole Jones*	935	55.4	+1.8
Conservative	Stephen Kirby	370	21.9	–2.3
Green	John Mann	235	13.9	+0.3
Liberal Democrats	Martin Hore	147	8.7	+0.1
Majority		565	33.5	+4.3
Turnout		1,707	26.5	+0.6
Registered electors		6,430		
Labour hold		Swing	▲2.1	

=== Whitehouse ===
Whitehouse
Party	Candidate	Votes	%	±%
Labour Co-op	Tracy Grant*	754	51.0	–1.3
Conservative	Mark Phillips	303	20.5	–9.5
Reform UK	David Hurlbut	191	12.9	N/A
Green	Sue Hagley	160	10.8	–1.6
Liberal Democrats	Immo Weichert	69	4.7	–0.6
Majority		451	30.5	+8.4
Turnout		1,492	23.2	+0.2
Registered electors		6,433		
Labour hold		Swing	▲4.1	

=== Whitton ===
Whitton
Party	Candidate	Votes	%	±%
Labour	Patricia Bruce-Browne	812	45.1	–2.4
Conservative	David Goldsmith	555	30.8	–8.9
Reform UK	Tony Gould*	265	14.7	N/A
Green	Jason Williams	105	5.8	–0.7
Liberal Democrats	Nicholas Jacob	65	3.6	–2.7
Majority		257	14.3	+6.5
Turnout		1,836	29.7	+0.3
Registered electors		6,190		
Labour gain from Independent		Swing	▲3.3	
