= 2023 Ipswich Borough Council election =

← 2022	4 May 2023	2024 →

16 out of 48 seats to Ipswich Borough Council 25 seats needed for a majority

	First party	Second party
Leader	David Ellesmere	Ian Fisher
Party	Labour	Conservative
Last election	32 seats, 46.8%	13 seats, 34.8%
Seats before	32	11
Seats won	12	3
Seats after	33	10
Seat change	▲1	▼1
Popular vote	13,740	10,930
Percentage	43.0%	34.2%
Swing	▼3.8%	▼0.6%
	Third party	Fourth party
Leader	Tim Lockington
Party	Liberal Democrats	Independent
Last election	3 seats, 10.2%	3 seats, 10.2%
Seats before	3	3
Seats won	1	0
Seats after	3	2
Seat change	Steady	Steady
Popular vote	3,742	N/A
Percentage	11.7%	N/A
Swing	▲1.5%	N/A
- Winner of each seat at the 2023 Ipswich Borough Council election
Leader before election
David Ellesmere
Labour
Leader after election
Neil MacDonald
Labour

The 2023 Ipswich Borough Council election took place on 4 May 2023 to elect members of Ipswich Borough Council in Suffolk, England. This was on the same day as other local elections in England.

Labour retained control of the council. The incumbent leader of the council, David Ellesmere, had announced ahead of the election that he would not continue as leader after the election. He was replaced as Labour group leader by Neil MacDonald, who formally took over as leader of the council at the subsequent annual council meeting on 17 May 2023.

== Summary ==
=== Election result ===
2023 Ipswich Borough Council election
Party	This election			Full council			This election		
Party	Seats	Net	Seats %	Other	Total	Total %	Votes	Votes %	+/−
Labour	12	▲1	75.0	21	33	68.8	13,740	43.0	–3.8
Conservative	3	▼1	18.8	7	10	20.8	10,930	34.2	–0.6
Liberal Democrats	1	Steady	6.3	2	3	6.3	3,742	11.7	+1.5
Independent	0	Steady	0.0	2	2	4.2	N/A	N/A	N/A
Green	0	Steady	0.0	0	0	0.0	3,405	10.7	+2.6
Reform UK	0	Steady	0.0	0	0	0.0	73	0.2	N/A
Heritage	0	Steady	0.0	0	0	0.0	45	0.1	N/A
ADF	0	Steady	0.0	0	0	0.0	35	0.1	±0.0

== Ward results ==
The Statement of Persons Nominated, which details the candidates standing in each ward, was released by Ipswich Borough Council following the close of nominations on 4 April 2023.

=== Alexandra ===
Alexandra
Party	Candidate	Votes	%	±%
Labour	Jane Riley	1,049	41.3	–12.5
Conservative	Sachin Karale	768	30.3	+5.9
Green	Tom Wilmot	610	24.0	+8.3
Liberal Democrats	Sophie Williams	111	4.4	–1.7
Majority		281	11.0	–18.0
Turnout		2,555	32.7	+2.9
Labour hold		Swing	▼9.2	

=== Bixley ===
Bixley
Party	Candidate	Votes	%	±%
Conservative	Richard Pope	1,205	49.9	–1.4
Labour	Paul Anderson	795	33.1	+0.8
Green	Stephanie Cullen	239	9.9	+0.9
Liberal Democrats	Lisa Wichert	164	6.8	–0.4
Majority		410	17.0	–2.1
Turnout		2,413	42.4	+2.2
Conservative hold		Swing	▼1.1	

=== Bridge ===
Bridge
Party	Candidate	Votes	%	±%
Labour	Philip Smart	843	50.4	+0.4
Conservative	John Downie	505	30.2	–3.6
Green	Adria Pittock	232	13.9	+3.2
Liberal Democrats	Kelly Turner	93	5.6	±0.0
Majority		338	20.2	+7.1
Turnout		1,677	25.5	–1.2
Labour hold		Swing	▲2.0	

=== Castle Hill ===
Castle Hill
Party	Candidate	Votes	%	±%
Conservative	Erion Xhaferaj	772	38.4	–8.8
Labour	Barry Studd	628	31.3	–1.0
Liberal Democrats	Martin Pakes	443	22.1	+1.7
Green	Sarah Welbourne	166	8.3	N/A
Majority		144	7.1	–7.8
Turnout		2,017	35.1	–0.5
Conservative hold		Swing	▼3.9	

=== Gainsborough ===
Gainsborough
Party	Candidate	Votes	%	±%
Labour	Martin Cook	974	54.2	+2.2
Conservative	Albert Demaj	602	33.5	–5.3
Green	Robert Young	150	8.3	+1.7
Liberal Democrats	Conrad Packwood	71	4.0	+1.4
Majority		372	20.6	+7.5
Turnout		1,802	29.4	–3.6
Labour hold		Swing	▲3.8	

=== Gipping ===
Gipping
Party	Candidate	Votes	%	±%
Labour	Peter Gardiner	869	54.9	–3.0
Conservative	Sian Gubb	438	27.7	–0.6
Green	Lee Morris	193	12.2	+3.6
Liberal Democrats	Henry Williams	83	5.2	±0.0
Majority		431	27.0	–2.6
Turnout		1,594	25.2	–1.1
Labour hold		Swing	▼1.2	

=== Holywells ===
Holywells
Party	Candidate	Votes	%	±%
Labour	Catherine Frost	1,037	46.4	–1.9
Conservative	Liz Harsant	909	40.6	+3.5
Green	Rory Richardson-Todd	171	7.6	–3.8
Liberal Democrats	Robert Chambers	120	5.4	+2.2
Majority		128	5.7	–5.5
Turnout		2,247	38.8	±0.0
Labour gain from Conservative		Swing	▼2.7	

=== Priory Heath ===
Priory Heath
Party	Candidate	Votes	%	±%
Labour	Mohammed Muhith	915	49.2	–4.4
Conservative	Thomas McNie	601	32.3	–0.6
Green	Andy Patmore	188	10.1	+2.1
Liberal Democrats	Trevor Powell	155	8.3	+2.9
Majority		314	16.8	–3.7
Turnout		1,871	28.0	–1.0
Labour hold		Swing	▼1.9	

=== Rushmere ===
Rushmere
Party	Candidate	Votes	%	±%
Labour Co-op	Kelvin Cracknell	1,113	47.5	–6.0
Conservative	Stephen Ion	794	33.9	+0.6
Green	Rachel Morris	234	10.0	+3.2
Liberal Democrats	Lucy Drake	200	8.5	+2.1
Majority		319	13.5	–6.7
Turnout		2355	38.2	–1.0
Labour Co-op hold		Swing	▼3.3	

=== Sprites ===
Sprites
Party	Candidate	Votes	%	±%
Labour	Jenny Smith	769	46.9	–2.1
Conservative	Michael Scanes	618	37.7	–6.1
Green	Martin Hynes	97	5.9	–1.4
Reform UK	Stuart Allen	73	4.5	N/A
Heritage	Terences Charles	45	2.7	N/A
Liberal Democrats	Robin Whitmore	38	2.3	N/A
Majority		151	9.2	+4.0
Turnout		1643	32.4	–1.4
Labour hold		Swing	▲2.0	

=== St. John's ===
St. John's
Party	Candidate	Votes	%	±%
Labour Co-op	Kanthasamy Elavalakan	1,064	45.8	–2.4
Conservative	Tim Buttle	736	31.7	–0.6
Liberal Democrats	Giles Turner	301	13.0	+2.5
Green	Judith Rook	220	9.5	+0.4
Majority		328	14.1	N/A
Turnout		2,333	33.6	–2.8
Labour Co-op hold		Swing	▼0.9	

=== St. Margaret's ===
St. Margaret's
Party	Candidate	Votes	%	±%
Liberal Democrats	Timothy Lockington	1,559	53.3	–5.7
Conservative	Laura Allenby	625	21.4	+2.6
Labour	Sheila Handley	486	16.6	+1.5
Green	Kirsty Wilmot	257	8.8	+1.6
Majority		934	31.8	–8.4
Turnout		2,934	45.7	–0.5
Liberal Democrats hold		Swing	▼4.2	

=== Stoke Park ===
Stoke Park
Party	Candidate	Votes	%	±%
Conservative	Nathan Wilson	814	46.2	+1.7
Labour	Chu Man	711	40.4	–6.2
Green	Barry Broom	128	7.3	+3.5
Liberal Democrats	Gerald Pryke	74	4.2	+0.8
ADF	Sandra Sparrow	35	2.0	+0.3
Majority		103	5.8	N/A
Turnout		1,771	34.4	–0.5
Conservative hold		Swing	▲4.0	

=== Westgate ===
Westgate
Party	Candidate	Votes	%	±%
Labour Co-op	Julian Gibbs	872	53.6	–0.8
Conservative	Debbie Richards	394	24.2	–1.5
Green	John Mann	222	13.6	+2.7
Liberal Democrats	Martin Hore	140	8.6	–0.4
Majority		478	29.2	+0.5
Turnout		1,636	25.9	–1.0
Labour Co-op hold		Swing	▲0.4	

=== Whitehouse ===
Whitehouse
Party	Candidate	Votes	%	±%
Labour	Lucinda Trenchard	765	52.3	–6.3
Conservative	Stephen Lark	439	30.0	–0.9
Green	Ned Harrison	182	12.4	+1.8
Liberal Democrats	Immo Weichert	78	5.3	N/A
Majority		326	22.1	–5.4
Turnout		1,476	23.0	–2.9
Labour hold		Swing	▼2.7	

=== Whitton ===
Whitton
Party	Candidate	Votes	%	±%
Labour	Gary Forster	850	47.5	–6.1
Conservative	James Harding	710	39.7	+1.2
Green	Jason Williams	116	6.5	+2.0
Liberal Democrats	Nicholas Jacob	112	6.3	+2.8
Majority		140	7.8	–7.2
Turnout		1,796	29.4	–3.6
Labour hold		Swing	▼3.7	
