= Whitehouse and Whitton Division, Suffolk =

Electoral division of Suffolk, England

Whitehouse and Whitton Division
- County Council constituency for the Suffolk County Council
- District: Ipswich
- Region: East of England
- Population: 20,538 (2019)
- Electorate: 15,823 (2021)
- Major settlements: Castle Hill, Westbourne, Whitehouse, Whitton

Current constituency
- Created: 2005
- Seats: 2
- Councillor: Sam Murray (Independent); David Goldsmith (Conservative)
- Local council: Ipswich Borough Council
- Created from: Castle Hill, Whitehouse, Whitton

Whitehouse and Whitton Division is an electoral division of Suffolk which returns two county councillors to Suffolk County Council.

== Geography ==
It is located in the North West Area of Ipswich and consists of Whitehouse Ward and Whitton Ward of Ipswich Borough Council as well as part of Castle Hill Ward in the North West Area, Ipswich.

== Members for Whitehouse and Whitton ==
Member	Party	Term	Member	Party	Term
Anthony Lewis	Labour	2005–2009	Graham Manuel	Labour	2005–2009
Robin Vickery	Conservative	2009–2013	Mary Young	Conservative	2009–2013
Kathy Bole	Labour	2013–2021	James Crossley	UKIP	2013–2017
Kathy Bole	Labour	2013–2021	David Goldsmith	Conservative	2017–present
Sam Murray	Independent (Conservative until 2025)	2021–present	David Goldsmith	Conservative	2017–present

== Election results ==
=== Elections in the 2020s ===
2021 Suffolk County Council election: Whitehouse and Whitton
Party	Candidate	Votes	%	±%
Conservative	David Goldsmith *	2,546	46.4	+8.5
Conservative	Sam Murray	2,317		
Labour	Sophie Meudec	2,130	38.8	+1.7
Labour	Christine Shaw	1,734		
Green	John Mann	527	9.6	+3.7
Liberal Democrats	Martin Pakes	286	5.2	–0.1
Liberal Democrats	Gerald Pryke	147		
Majority		416	7.8	+6.9
Rejected ballots		60	0.6	▲0.5
Turnout		5,350	33.8	▲4.5
Registered electors		15,823		▲576
Conservative hold		Swing	+3.4	
Conservative gain from Labour		Swing		
