= Westgate =

Westgate or West Gate may refer to:

== Companies ==
- Westgate Resorts, a real estate company and timeshare company
- Westgate Department Stores, the department store division of Anglia Regional Co-operative Society in the United Kingdom

== Events ==
- Westgate shopping mall shooting, a 2013 attack on the Westgate mall in Nairobi, Kenya
- 2020 Westgate Entertainment District shooting, a 2020 incel terrorist attack in Glendale, Arizona

== Places ==
=== United Kingdom ===
- Westgate, County Durham, a village
- Westgate, Gloucester, an area of the city
- Westgate, Lincolnshire, a hamlet
- Westgate, Newcastle upon Tyne, a former electoral ward
- Westgate, Norfolk, a location
- Westgate-on-Sea, Kent, a town
- Westgate Ward, Ipswich, Suffolk
- Westgate (Wakefield), a street in West Yorkshire

=== United States ===
- Westgate, Alaska, see List of places in Alaska (W)
- Westgate, Baltimore, Maryland
- Westgate, Georgia, see List of places in Georgia (U.S. state) (S–Z)
- Westgate, Iowa
- Westgate, Los Angeles
- Westgate, Columbus, Ohio
- Westgate, Austin, Texas, a neighborhood in Austin, Texas
- West Gate, Prince William County, Virginia
- Westgate, Florida
- Westgate Entertainment District, Glendale, Arizona

=== Other countries ===
- Westgate, Calgary, a neighbourhood in Calgary, Alberta, Canada
- Westgate, Manitoba, Canada
- Westgate, New Zealand, a suburb of Auckland, New Zealand
- Westgate, NSW is the western approach to Sydney, NSW, Australia
- Westgate, Queensland, Australia
- Westgate, Mitchells Plain, a neighbourhood in Cape Town, South Africa

== Schools ==
- Westgate Collegiate & Vocational Institute, a high school in Thunder Bay, Ontario, Canada
- Westgate Mennonite Collegiate, a private school in Winnipeg, Manitoba, Canada
- The Westgate School, Slough, Berkshire, UK
- The Westgate School, Winchester, Hampshire, UK

== Structures ==
=== Historic city gates ===
- Chinatown West Gate, in Los Angeles, California
- Westgate, a medieval gatehouse in the Canterbury ward of Westgate
- West Gate, in Ipswich, Suffolk
- Westgate, a medieval fortified gateway in Winchester, Hampshire

=== Shopping centres ===
- Westgate Center, San Jose, California
- Westgate Mall (disambiguation), various shopping centers around the world
- Westgate, Nairobi, Kenya, a shopping mall in the Westlands division of Nairobi
- Westgate Oxford, a shopping centre in Oxford, England
- Westgate, Singapore
- Central WestGate, Thailand

=== Other structures ===
- Westgate Las Vegas, Nevada, a casino hotel
- Westgate Hotel, in Newport, United Kingdom
- West Gate Bridge, Melbourne, Australia
- West Gate Freeway, Melbourne, Australia
- Wakefield Westgate railway station, England
- Westgate Tower, Austin, Texas

== Other uses ==
- Westgate (surname), a surname
- Westgate (album), a 2007 album by Mark Seymour
- Westgate (Metro Transit station), a planned light rail stop along the Central Corridor line in Saint Paul, Minnesota
- Westgate (Pacific Electric), a suburban line operated by the Pacific Electric Railway from 1911 to 1940
- Westgate FC, an association football club based in Melbourne, Australia
- USS West Gate (ID-3216), a cargo ship of the US Navy
