= 2022 Ipswich Borough Council election =

2022 UK local government election

- 5 May 2022

17 out of 48 seats to Ipswich Borough Council 25 seats needed for a majority

	First party	Second party	Third party
Party	Labour	Conservative	Liberal Democrats
Last election	30 seats, 48.4%	15 seats, 36.8%	3 seats, 10.1%
Seats won	14	2	1
Seats after	32	13	3
Seat change	▲2	▼2	Steady
Popular vote	16,645	12,393	3,632
Percentage	46.8%	34.8%	10.2%
Swing	▼1.6%	▼2.0%	▲0.1%
- Winner of each seat at the 2022 Ipswich Borough Council election
Council control before election
Labour
Council control after election
Labour

Elections to Ipswich Borough Council (IBC) took place on 5 May 2022. 17 seats were contested – one in each of the 16 wards, plus an additional bye election in St John's Ward.

The Conservatives failed to capitalise on any of the gains they had made in the previous year, and lost two seats to Labour. They made noticeable progress in traditionally strong Labour areas such Bridge, Gainsborough and Sprites, although failed to make gains. They lost Holywells and Stoke Park to Labour, which are traditionally stronger areas for the party.

Labour, who increased their majority from 12 to 16, made two gains from the Conservatives but actually saw their vote share fall on 2018, when this round of seats were last fought.

The Liberal Democrats saw their overall votes across the Borough remain static, but scored their best ever result in St Margaret’s ward, which is a stronghold for them.

The Green Party made the most progress in terms of vote share but failed to win a seat. Their support rose most in more central areas such as Alexandra and Holywells.

== Timetable ==
IBC published the following timetable:

- 28 March: Formal notification of election
- 5 April: Deadline for election
- 6 April: Publication of candidates statements
- 14 April: Last day for voter registration
- 5 May: Poll, 07:00 to 22:00

== Summary ==
=== Statement of persons nominated ===
IBC published the statement of the persons nominated for election as a Borough Councillor on 5 April 2022. The Labour Party retained control of the Council.

=== Election result ===
Results comparison based on 2018 elections in which UKIP stood, but did not contest these elections.

2022 Ipswich Borough Council election
Party	This election				Full council			This election		
Party	Candidates	Seats	Net	Seats %	Other	Total	Total %	Votes	Votes %	+/−
Labour	{{{candidates}}}	14	▲2	82.0	18	32	66.7	16,645	46.8	–1.6
Conservative	{{{candidates}}}	2	▼2	12.0	11	13	27.0	12,393	34.8	–2.0
Liberal Democrats	{{{candidates}}}	1	Steady	6.0	2	3	6.3	3,632	10.2	+0.1
Green	{{{candidates}}}	0	Steady	0.0	0	0	0.0	2,878	8.1	+4.8
ADF	{{{candidates}}}	0	Steady	0.0	0	0	0.0	31	0.1	+0.1

== Ward results ==
=== Alexandra ===
Alexandra
Party	Candidate	Votes	%	±%
Labour	John Cook	1,228	53.8	–6.0
Conservative	Laura Allenby	557	24.4	+0.4
Green	Tom Wilmot	357	15.7	+6.5
Liberal Democrats	Sophie Williams	139	6.1	–1.0
Majority		671	29	
Turnout		2280	29.8	
Labour hold		Swing		

=== Bixley ===
Bixley
Party	Candidate	Votes	%	±%
Conservative	Edward Phillips	1,184	51.5	–7.6
Labour	Paul Anderson	743	32.3	0.0
Green	Stephanie Cullen	207	9.0	+9.0
Liberal Democrats	Trevor Powell	167	7.2	–1.4
Majority		441	19.1	
Turnout		2301	40.2	
Conservative hold		Swing		

=== Bridge ===
Bridge
Party	Candidate	Votes	%	±%
Labour Co-op	Stephen Connelly	880	50.0	–9.6
Conservative	Mike Scanes	595	33.8	+4.8
Green	Adria Pittock	188	10.7	+3.3
Liberal Democrats	Henry Williams	98	5.6	+1.6
Majority		285	13.1	
Turnout		2168	26.7	
Labour hold		Swing		

=== Castle Hill ===
Castle Hill
Party	Candidate	Votes	%	±%
Conservative	Sam Murray	978	47.2	–5.8
Labour	Kimberley Clements	668	32.3	–3.5
Liberal Democrats	Martin Pakes	423	20.4	+11.2
Majority		310	14.9	
Turnout		2069	35.6	
Conservative hold		Swing		

=== Gainsborough ===
Gainsborough
Party	Candidate	Votes	%	±%
Labour Co-op	Lynne Mortimer	1,061	52.0	–2.1
Conservative	Albert Demaj	793	38.8	+8.3
Green	Brieanna Patmore	135	6.6	+3.0
Liberal Democrats	Conrad Packwood	53	2.6	+0.8
Majority		268	13.1	
Turnout		2042	33.0	
Labour hold		Swing		

=== Gipping ===
Gipping
Party	Candidate	Votes	%	±%
Labour	Elizabeth Hughes	971	57.9	–2.3
Conservative	Sian Gubb	474	28.3	–3.2
Green	Lee Morris	145	8.6	+8.6
Liberal Democrats	Lisa Weichert	87	5.2	–3.1
Majority		497	29.6	
Turnout		1677	26.3	
Labour hold		Swing		

=== Holywells ===
Holywells
Party	Candidate	Votes	%	±%
Labour	George Lankester	1,095	48.3	+2.1
Conservative	John Downie	842	37.1	–7.2
Green	Jenny Rivett	260	11.4	+5.4
Liberal Democrats	Robin Whitmore	72	3.2	–0.2
Majority		253	11.2	
Turnout		2269	38.8	
Labour gain from Conservative		Swing		

=== Priory Heath ===
Priory Heath
Party	Candidate	Votes	%	±%
Labour Co-op	Daniel Maguire	1,033	53.6	–0.6
Conservative	Andy Shannon	635	32.9	–2.5
Green	Andy Patmore	155	8.0	+2.7
Liberal Democrats	Nicholas Jacob	105	5.4	+0.3
Majority		398	20.5	
Turnout		1938	29.0	
Labour hold		Swing		

=== Rushmere ===
Rushmere
Party	Candidate	Votes	%	±%
Labour	Stefan Long	1,308	53.5	–3.5
Conservative	Paul Cawthorn	814	33.3	–2.7
Green	Rachel Morris	165	6.8	+6.8
Liberal Democrats	Lucy Drake	156	6.4	–0.6
Majority		494	20.2	
Turnout		2450	39.2	
Labour hold		Swing		

=== Sprites ===
Sprites
Party	Candidate	Votes	%	±%
Labour	Colin Smart	847	49.0	–10.0
Conservative	Roland Mortimer	757	43.8	+12.6
Green	Barry Broom	126	7.3	+7.3
Majority		90	5.2	
Turnout		1741	33.8	
Labour hold		Swing		

=== St. John's ===
(2 seats up due to by-election)

St. John's
Party	Candidate	Votes	%	±%
Labour	Sophie Connelly	1,290	50.7	–4.8
Labour	Kanthasamy Elavalakan	1,228	48.3	–6.8
Conservative	Tim Buttle	865	34.0	+1.2
Conservative	Sachin Karale	790	31.1	–1.7
Liberal Democrats	Giles Turner	280	11.0	+4.0
Green	Jude Rook	243	9.6	+4.5
Green	Jason Williams	159	6.3	+1.2
Turnout		2,543	36.4	
Labour hold		Swing		
Labour hold		Swing		

=== St. Margaret's ===
St Margaret's
Party	Candidate	Votes	%	±%
Liberal Democrats	Inga Lockington	1,765	59.0	+8.6
Conservative	Stephen Ion	563	18.8	–6.0
Labour	Ruman Muhith	451	15.1	–5.6
Green	Kirsty Wilmot	215	7.2	+3.7
Majority		1,202	40.2	
Turnout		3,003	46.2	
Liberal Democrats hold		Swing		

=== Stoke Park ===
Stoke Park
Party	Candidate	Votes	%	±%
Labour	Tony Blacker	855	46.6	+7.4
Conservative	Nadia Cenci	817	44.5	–9.0
Green	Martin Hynes	69	3.8	–0.8
Liberal Democrats	Adam Merritt	62	3.4	+0.8
ADF	Sandra Sparrow	31	1.7	+1.7
Majority		38	2.1	
Turnout		1,834	34.9	
Labour gain from Conservative		Swing		

=== Westgate ===
Westgate
Party	Candidate	Votes	%	±%
Labour	Colin Kreidewolf	939	54.4	–2.8
Conservative	Debbie Richards	444	25.7	–1.3
Green	John Mann	188	10.9	+3.9
Liberal Democrats	Martin Hore	156	9.0	+0.2
Majority		395	28.7	
Turnout		1739	26.9	
Labour hold		Swing		

=== Whitehouse ===
Whitehouse
Party	Candidate	Votes	%	±%
Labour	Colin Wright	970	58.6	+1.4
Conservative	David Goldsmith	511	30.9	+2.6
Green	Andrea McDonald	175	10.6	+10.6
Majority		459	27.5	
Turnout		1670	25.9	
Labour hold		Swing		

=== Whitton ===
Whitton
Party	Candidate	Votes	%	±%
Labour Co-op	Christine Shaw	1,078	53.6	+1.0
Conservative	Michelle Bevan Margetts	774	38.5	–4.1
Green	Edmund Harrison	91	4.5	+4.5
Liberal Democrats	Julie Fletcher	70	3.5	–1.2
Majority		304	15.0	
Turnout		2020	33.0	
Labour hold		Swing		

== By-elections ==
=== Priory Heath ===
A by-election was called due to the resignation of Cllr Sarah Barber.

Priory Heath: 15 December 2022
Party	Candidate	Votes	%	±%
Labour	Roxanne Downes	653	59.9	
Conservative	Gregory McNie	314	28.8	
Liberal Democrats	Trevor Powell	123	11.3	
Majority		339	31.1	
Turnout		1,090	16.8	
Labour hold		Swing		
