= Priory Heath Ward, Ipswich =

Ward in Ipswich

Priory Heath
- ward for Ipswich Council
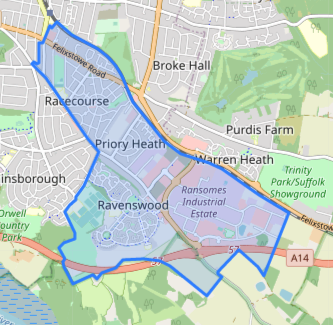
- Boundary of Priory Heath in Ipswich from 2019.
- Local government in East of England: Suffolk

Current ward
- Created: 2002
- Councillor: Owen Bartholomew (Labour)
- Councillor: Daniel Maguire (Labour)
- Councillor: Luke Richardson (Labour)

Priory Heath Ward is a ward in the South East Area of Ipswich, Suffolk, England. It returns three councillors to Ipswich Borough Council.

It is designated Middle Layer Super Output Area Ipswich 014 by the Office for National Statistics. It is composed of 6 Lower Layer Super Output Areas.

The ward includes:

- Racecourse
- Ipswich Transport Museum
- Ransomes Industrial Estate

== Councillors ==
The following councillors were elected since the boundaries were changed in 2002. Names in brackets indicates that the councillor remained in office without re-election.

Date	Councillor	Councillor	Councillor
May 2002	Bradley Maguire	William Quinton	Dali Jabbar
May 2003	(Bradley Maguire)	(William Quinton)	Dali Jabbar
June 2004	(Bradley Maguire)	William Quinton	(Dali Jabbar)
May 2006	John Cook	(William Quinton)	(Dali Jabbar)
May 2007	(John Cook)	(William Quinton)	William Knowles
May 2008	(John Cook)	William Quinton	(William Knowles)
May 2010	John Legrys	(William Quinton)	(William Knowles)
May 2011	(John Legrys)	(William Quinton)	William Knowles
May 2012	(John Legrys)	William Quinton	(William Knowles)
May 2014	Daniel Maguire	(William Quinton)	(William Knowles)
May 2015|	(Daniel Maguire)	(William Quinton)	William Knowles
May 2016	(Daniel Maguire)	Sarah Barber	(William Knowles)
May 2018	Daniel Maguire	(Sarah Barber)	(William Knowles)
May 2019	(Daniel Maguire)	(Sarah Barber)	Luke Richardson
May 2021	(Daniel Maguire)	Sarah Barber	(Luke Richardson)
May 2022	Daniel Maguire	(Sarah Barber)	(Luke Richardson)
December 2022	Daniel Maguire	Roxanne Downes	(Luke Richardson)
May 2023	Daniel Maguire	Roxanne Downes	(Mohammed Muhith)
May 2024	Owen Bartholomew	Roxanne Downes	Mohammed Muhith

Sarah Barker stood down as a councillor with immediate effect on 7 November 2022. A bye election is due to take place on 15 December 2022.
