= The Westgate School =

The Westgate School may refer to:

- The Westgate School, Winchester, Winchester, Hampshire, UK
- The Westgate School, Slough, Cippenham, Slough, Berkshire, UK

== See also ==
- Westgate (disambiguation)
