= Holywells Ward, Ipswich =

Ward in Ipswich

Holywells
- ward for Ipswich Council
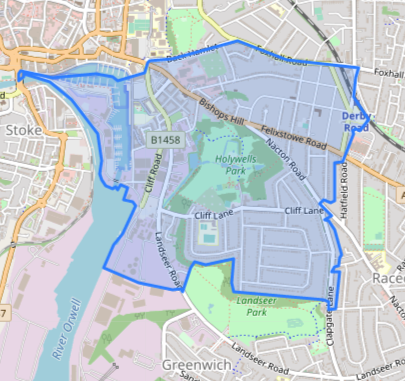
- Boundary of Holywells in Ipswich from 2019.
- Local government in East of England: Suffolk

Current ward
- Created: 2002
- Councillor: Nic El-Safty (Labour)
- Councillor: George Lankester (Labour)
- Councillor: Cathy Frost (Labour)

Holywells Ward is a ward in the South East Area of Ipswich, Suffolk, England. It returns three councillors to Ipswich Borough Council.

It is designated Middle Layer Super Output Area Ipswich 011 by the Office for National Statistics. It is composed of 5 Lower Layer Super Output Areas.

The ward includes:

- Holywells Park
- Part of Ipswich Waterfront

== Councillors ==
The following councillors were elected since the boundaries were changed in 2002. Names in brackets indicates that the councillor remained in office without re-election.

Councillor Jan Parry, who was elected in May 2018, became Mayor of Ipswich in 2019. She continued until January 2021, when she resigned for unexplained reasons.

Councillor Elizabeth Harsant led the Council between 2004 and 2011.

Date	Councillor	Councillor	Councillor
May 2002	George Debman	David Hale	Elizabeth Harsant
May 2003	(George Debman)	(David Hale)	Elizabeth Harsant
June 2004	(George Debman)	David Hale	(Elizabeth Harsant)
May 2006	George Debman	(David Hale)	(Elizabeth Harsant)
May 2007	(George Debman)	(David Hale)	Elizabeth Harsant
May 2008	(George Debman)	David Hale	(Elizabeth Harsant)
May 2010	George Debman	(David Hale)	(Elizabeth Harsant)
May 2011	(George Debman)	(David Hale)	Elizabeth Harsant
May 2012	(George Debman)	Pam Stewart	(Elizabeth Harsant)
May 2014	George Debman	(Pam Stewart)	(Elizabeth Harsant)
May 2015|	(George Debman)	(Pam Stewart)	Elizabeth Harsant
May 2016	(George Debman)	Barry Studd	(Elizabeth Harsant)
May 2018	Janice Parry	(Barry Studd)	(Elizabeth Harsant)
May 2019	(Janice Parry)	(Barry Studd)	Elizabeth Harsant
May 2021	John Downie	Philippa Gordon-Gould	(Elizabeth Harsant)
May 2022	George Lankester	(Philippa Gordon-Gould)	(Elizabeth Harsant)
May 2023	(George Lankester)	(Philippa Gordon-Gould)	Cathy Frost
May 2024	(George Lankester)	Nic El-Safty	(Cathy Frost)
