= St Margaret's and Westgate Division, Suffolk =

Electoral division of Suffolk, England

St Margaret's and Westgate
- County Council constituency for the Suffolk County Council
- District: Ipswich
- Region: East of England
- Population: 22,325 (2019)
- Electorate: 15,503 (2021)
- Major settlements: Broom Hill, Christchurch

Current constituency
- Created: 2005
- Seats: 2
- Councillor: Debbie Richards (Conservative); Inga Lockington (Liberal Democrat)
- Local council: Ipswich Borough Council
- Created from: Broom Hill, Castle Hill, St Margaret's

St Margaret's and Westgate Division is an electoral division of Suffolk which returns two county councillors to Suffolk County Council.

== Geography ==
It is covers parts of the Central Area of Ipswich and consists of St Margaret's Ward and Westgate Ward of Ipswich Borough Council as well as small part of Castle Hill Ward in the North West Area, Ipswich.

== Members for St. Margaret's and Westgate ==
Member	Party	Term	Member	Party	Term
Andrew Cann	Liberal Democrats	2005–2013	Inga Lockington	Liberal Democrats	2005–present
Sarah Adams	Labour	2013–2017	Inga Lockington	Liberal Democrats	2005–present
Chris Chambers	Conservative	2017–2021	Inga Lockington	Liberal Democrats	2005–present
Debbie Richards	Conservative	2021–present	Inga Lockington	Liberal Democrats	2005–present

== Election results ==
=== Elections in the 2020s ===
2021 Suffolk County Council election: St Margaret's & Westgate
Party	Candidate	Votes	%	±%
Liberal Democrats	Inga Lockington *	2,590	32.8	–2.6
Conservative	Debbie Richards	2,195	27.8	–2.5
Labour	Assis Carreiro	1,989	25.2	–4.2
Liberal Democrats	Oliver Holmes	1,840		
Labour	Stefan Long	1,517		
Green	Kirsty Wilmot	965	12.2	+7.2
Burning Pink	Tina Smith	168	2.1	N/A
Majority		395	5.0	–0.1
Turnout		6,612	42.6	+2.4
Registered electors		15,503		
Liberal Democrats hold		Swing	–0.1	
Conservative hold		Swing		
