= List of public art in Suffolk =

Permanent outdoor art in Suffolk, England

This is a list of public art in the Suffolk county of England. This list applies only to works of public art on permanent display in an outdoor public space. For example, this does not include artworks in museums.

The list can be sorted by clicking on the corresponding arrows in the column titles.

Image	Title / subject	Location and coordinates	Date	Artist / designer	Type	Material	Dimensions	Designation	Notes
More images	Triton	Royal Plain, Lowestoft 52°28′17.3″N 1°45′1.8″E	1849	John Thomas	Sculpture on column	York stone		Grade II	Commissioned by Samuel Morton Peto.
	Prince Albert	Framlingham College, Framlingham 52°13′35″N 1°20′21.5″E	1865	Joseph Durham	Statue on pedestal	Bronze and granite	Statue height 8 ft (2.4 m)	Grade II	
	The Drums of the Fore and Aft	Market Hill, Woodbridge 52°5′38.4″N 1°18′50.1″E	1901	Arnold Keppel, 8th Earl of Albemarle	Sculpture	Bronze	1.80 m (5 ft 11 in) high		Placed here in 1980, in memory of Walter Keppel, 9th Earl of Albemarle.
More images	Boer War Memorial	Cornhill, Bury St Edmunds 52°14′45.9″N 0°42′44.9″E	1904	Arthur George Walker	Sculpture on pedestal			Grade II	
More images	Thomas Gainsborough	Market Hill, Sudbury 52°2′18.8″N 0°43′51.3″E	1913	Bertram Mackennal	Statue on pedestal	Bronze and stone		Grade II	Gainsborough is shown holding a palette and brush.
More images	War Memorial	Promenade, Undercliff Road West, Felixstowe 51°57′33.5″N 1°20′57.8″E	1920		Sculpture on column	Bronze and Portland stone		Grade II	A sculpture of a dove on a Corinthian column.
More images	War Memorial	Angel Hill, Bury St Edmunds 52°14′44″N 0°42′56.8″E	1921	Sidney Naish	Wheel-cross	Clipsham stone		Grade II	Unveiled by General Lord Horne.
More images	Naval War Memorial	Yarmouth Road, Lowestoft 52°29′18.4″N 1°45′19.8″E	1953	F. H. Crossley and H. Tyson Smith	Memorial			Grade II	Dedicated to the Royal Naval Patrol Service. Unveiled by Sir Rhoderick McGrigor.
	Hyperion	High Street, Newmarket 52°14′35.5″N 0°24′17.3″E	1961	John Skeaping	Equestrian sculpture on pedestal	Bronze and stone	2.00 m (6 ft 7 in) high (sculpture)		Commissioned by John Stanley, 18th Earl of Derby. Sited in front of the Jockey Club Rooms.
More images	The Family of Man	Snape Maltings 52°9′47.2″N 1°29′55.7″E	1976	Barbara Hepworth	Three abstract sculptures				Three of the set of nine figures, of which casts are located in various sites, representing different stages of life.
	Ship	Civic Drive, Ipswich 52°03′28.8″N 1°8′50.5″E		Bernard Reynolds	Sculpture	glass-reinforced aluminum resin	3.83 m (12.6 ft) high		An arrangement of sail and hull motifs: a tribute to Ipswich as a port.
	Man and Ball	Ransomes Industrial Estate, Ipswich 52°02′0.4″N 1°12′22.4″E	1995	Giles Penny	Sculpture	Bronze	1.84 m (6 ft 0 in) high		Commissioned by Ransomes Industrial Estate.
	The Lifeboatman	Royal Terrace, Lowestoft 52°28′21.6″N 1°44′57.9″E	2000	Dominic Marshall	Statue	Fibreglass, concrete and stone			Dedicated to all Lowestoft Lifeboatmen.
More images	Scallop	Aldeburgh beach 52°09′37.9″N 1°36′21.1″E	2003	Maggi Hambling	Sculpture	Stainless steel	3.70 m (12.1 ft) high		It bears a quote from Benjamin Britten's Peter Grimes: "I hear those voices that will not be drowned".
More images	Handstanding	Downham Boulevard, Ipswich 52°1′43.3″N 1°11′40.4″E	2006	Martin Heron	Sculpture	Corten steel	4.50 m (14.8 ft) high		Commissioned by Ipswich Borough Council. Silhouettes of hands are welded together, representing community values.
	Hands Sculpture	Outside Quay Church, Quay Street, Woodbridge 52°5′30.1″N 1°19′2.1″E	2014	Rick Kirby	Sculpture				Commissioned by Woodbridge Quay Church.
	The Queen's Statue	High Street, Newmarket 52°14′22.2″N 0°23′37.7″E	2016	Etienne Millner and Charlie Langton	Sculpture	Bronze, on plinth of Portland stone			Queen Elizabeth II, with mare and foal, is depicted in 1977, the year of her Silver Jubilee.
	Yoxman	Near Yoxford 52°16′2″N 1°30′51.3″E	2021	Laurence Edwards	Sculpture	Bronze, wood and detritus	7.92 m (26.0 ft) high		Commissioned by Wilderness Reserve, and is sited on their estate.
