= Westgate Mall =

Westgate Mall or Westgate Shopping Centre may refer to:

== Canada ==
- Westgate Shopping Centre (Ottawa) in Ottawa, Ontario, Canada

== Kenya ==
- Westgate, Nairobi
  - Westgate shopping mall attack, four-day 2013 terrorist attack with at least 67 deaths, resulting in the partial collapse of the mall

== Singapore ==
- Westgate, Singapore

== United Kingdom ==
- Westgate, Oxford in Oxford, England
- Westgate Park Shopping Centre, part of Basildon Town Centre

== United States ==
- The Westgate (formerly Westgate Mall), Pennsylvania
- Westgate Center, California
- Westgate Mall (Amarillo, Texas)
- Westgate Mall (Brockton), Massachusetts
- Westgate Mall (Fairview Park, Ohio)
- Westgate Mall (Macon, Georgia)
- Westgate Mall (Spartanburg, South Carolina)
- Westgate Plaza (Albany, New York)
- Westgate Mall (Madison)

== See also ==
- Westgate (disambiguation)
