= West Gate, Ipswich =

Historic structure in Ipswich, England

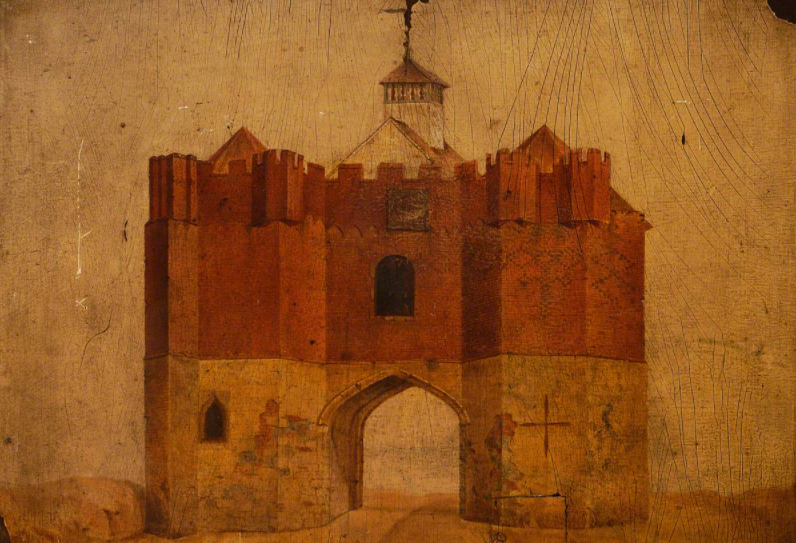
Painting of West Gate by George Frost

West Gate (also Barre Gate), Ipswich was part of the medieval town defences of Ipswich, a prominent town in Suffolk, England. It was located at the western end of the main thoroughfare running east–west through the original settlement and which provided a focus for habitation since the eighth century. Although demolished in the 1780s, it has lent its name to West Gate Street, Westgate Ward, Ipswich and St Margaret's and Westgate Division, Suffolk.

== Medieval origins ==
In medieval times it was known as Barre Gate, and is labelled such on John Speed's Map of Ipswich (1610). The Latin equivalent of that name – portas barratas – appears on a deed dating to 1343. In 1352 Edward III granted a licence to crenellate Gippewico (Ipswich) to the Homines de Gippewico.
