= South West Area, Ipswich =

Administrative area of Ipswich, United Kingdom

Coordinates: 52°02′16″N 1°07′23″E

The South West Area, Ipswich is one of five administrative areas in Ipswich, through which Ipswich Borough Council divides its spending and enables feedback from local residents, businesses and community groups.

The area is composed of four wards, each represented by three councillors. Each ward is also a Middle Layer Super Output Area (MSOA). As of the 2019 Ipswich Borough Council election, the councillors are as follows:

Ward	Councillor	Councillor	Councillor	MSOA
Bridge	Stephen Connolly	Bryony Rudkin	Philip Smart	Ipswich 012
Gipping	David Ellesmere	Peter Gardiner	Elizabeth Hughes	Ipswich 010
Sprites	Colin Smart	Philip McSweeney	Jenny Smith	Ipswich 013
Stoke Park	Tony Blacker	Rhys Ellis	Nathan Wilson	Ipswich 015

These Councillors form the South West Area Committee of which Tracy Grant is the chair.

The area is also covered by a Neighbourhood Watch network which comprises 35 neighbourhood watch schemes.
