= Central Area, Ipswich =

Administrative area of Ipswich, England

Coordinates: 52°03.4′N 1°09.4′E

The Central Area, Ipswich is one of five administrative areas in Ipswich, through which Ipswich Borough Council divides its spending and enables feedback from local residents, businesses and community groups.

The area is composed of three wards, each represented by three councillors. Each ward is also a Middle Layer Super Output Area (MSOA). As of the 2019 Ipswich Borough Council election, the councillors are as follows:

| Ward | Councillor | Councillor | Councillor | MSOA |
|---|---|---|---|---|
| Alexandra | Adam Rae | John Cook | Jane Riley | Ipswich 007 |
| St Margaret's | Oliver Holmes | Inga Lockington | Timothy Lockington | Ipswich 005 |
| Westgate | Carole Jones | Colin Kreidewolf | Julian Gibbs | Ipswich 006 |

These Councillors form the Central Area Committee of which Julian Gibbs is the chair. They are joined by three Suffolk County Councillors:

| Ward | Councillor |
|---|---|
| Bridge Division, Suffolk | Rob Bridgeman |
| St Helen's Division, Suffolk | Elizabeth Johnson |
| St Margaret's and Westgate Division, Suffolk | Debbie Richards |

The area is also covered by a Neighbourhood Watch network which comprises 35 neighbourhood watch schemes.
