= Whitehouse, Ipswich =

Suburb of Ipswich, Suffolk, England

Coordinates: 52°4′38″N 1°6′56″E

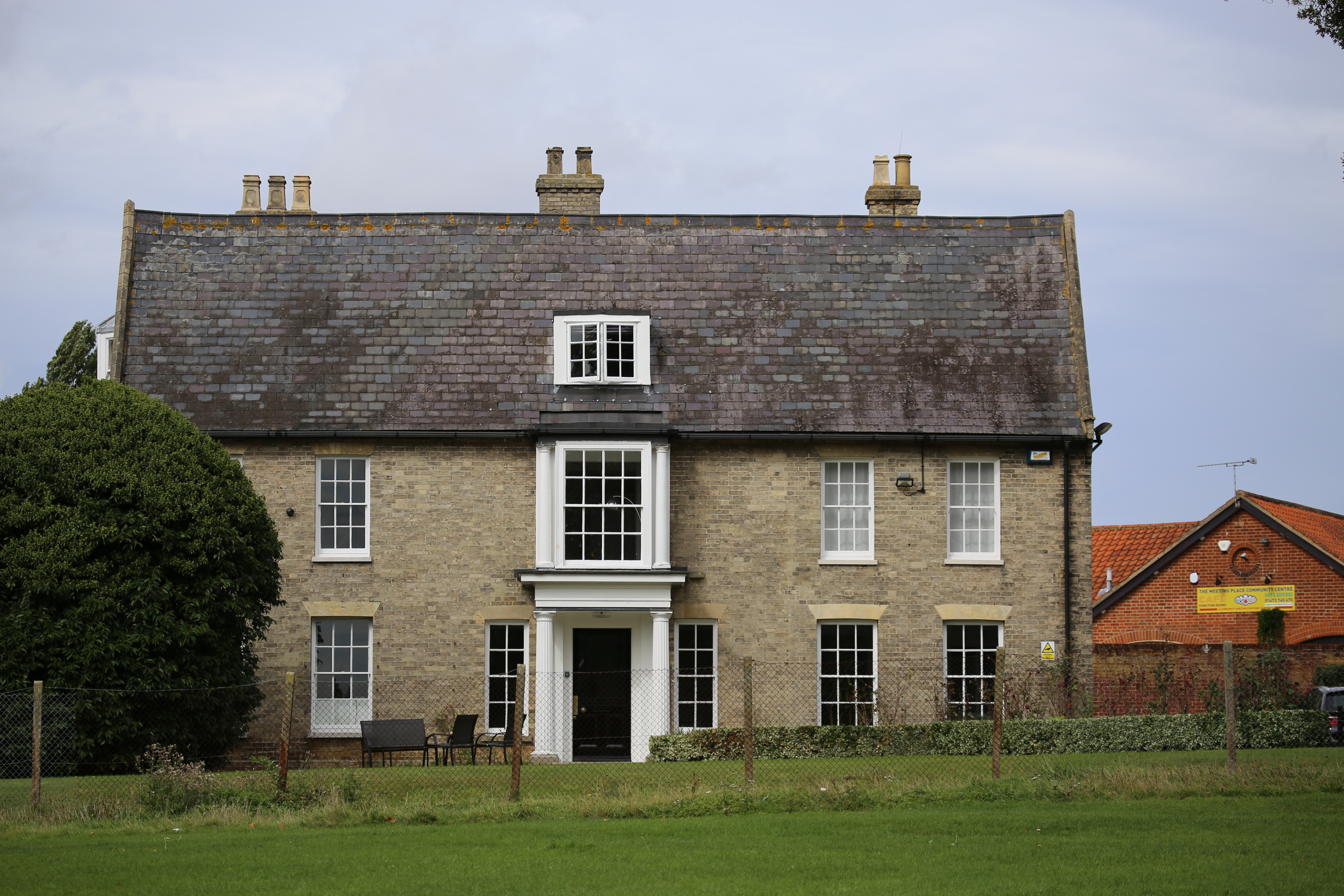
The White House, September 2017

Whitehouse refers to an area in North West Area of the town Ipswich, in the Ipswich district, in the county of Suffolk, England. The name comes from a late 17th Century building which still exists and is a Grade II listed building near Norwich Road, but now accessed by Limerick Close. The Whitehouse Ward, Ipswich takes its name from the area.

== The White House ==
The White House itself is next to White House Park. It was a substantial country house on the edge of the village – until it became absorbed into Ipswich as the town grew during the first half of the 20th Century. It can be accessed from Limerick Close. It is listed as Grade II, which still stands on the edge of the White House estate. It also boasts a gate lodge on Norwich Road. It was Built as a small country house in the late 17th century and altered in the early 19th century with late 19th century additions. It retains its complete 17th century roof structure. It was used for many years as local government offices.

Lovetofts Drive: running north from the end of Bramford Lane to Whitehouse Road is named after John de Lovetot who had a grant of free warren there in 1277. He died in 1295. There was a manor house known as Lovetofts Hall and a nearby farmhouse which was still shown on the 1955 Ordnance Survey map, but had disappeared by the 1959 map.
