= St Margaret's Ward, Ipswich =

Ward in Ipswich

St Margaret's
- ward for Ipswich Council
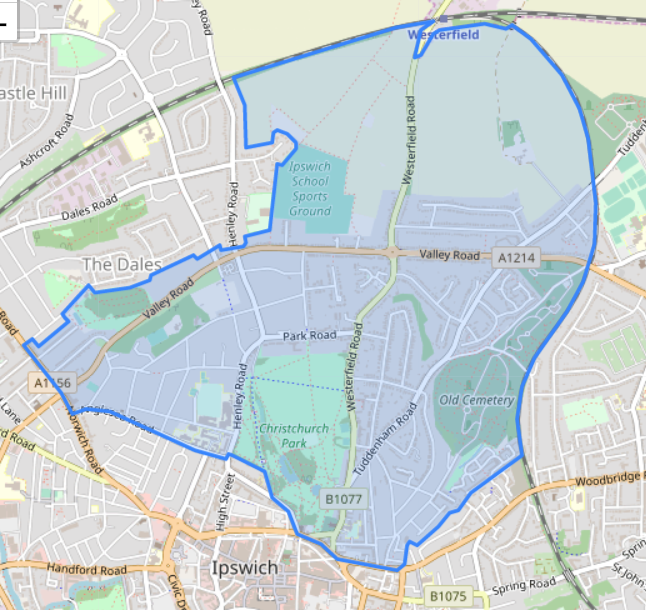
- Boundary of St Margaret's in Ipswich from 2019.
- Local government in East of England: Suffolk
- Electorate: 6482

Current ward
- Created: 2002
- Councillor: Oliver Holmes (Liberal Democrat Party (UK))
- Councillor: Inga Lockington (Liberal Democrat Party (UK))
- Councillor: Timothy Lockington (Liberal Democrat Party (UK))

St Margaret's Ward is a ward in the Central Area of Ipswich, Suffolk, England. It returns three councillors to Ipswich Borough Council.

It is designated Middle Layer Super Output Area Ipswich 005 by the Office for National Statistics. It is composed of 5 Lower Layer Super Output Areas.

== Ipswich Borough Council Elections ==
=== Ipswich Borough Council Elections in the 2020s ===
2023 Ipswich Borough Council election (Thursday 2 May 2024)
Party	Candidate	Votes	%	±%
Liberal Democrats	Oliver Holmes*	1,431	51.0	–2.3
Labour	Sheila Handley	559	19.9	+3.3
Conservative	Laura Allenby	477	17.0	–4.4
Green	Kirsty Wilmot	341	12.1	+3.3
Majority		872	31.1	–0.7
Turnout		2,828	43.6	–2.1
Registered electors		6,482		
Liberal Democrats hold		Swing	▼2.8	

2023 Ipswich Borough Council election (Thursday 4 May 2023)
Party	Candidate	Votes	%	±%
Liberal Democrats	Timothy Lockington	1,559	53.3	−5.7
Conservative	Laura Allenby	625	21.4	+2.6
Labour	Sheila Handley	486	16.6	+1.5
Green	Kirsty Wilmot	257	8.8	+1.6
Majority		934	31.8	−8.2
Rejected ballots		7	0.2	-0.1
Turnout		2934	45.7	−0.5
Registered electors		6,421		−1.2
Liberal Democrats hold		Swing	-4.2	

2022 Ipswich Borough Council election (Thursday 5 May 2022)
Party	Candidate	Votes	%	±%
Liberal Democrats	Inga Lockington	1,765	59.0	+18.5
Conservative	Stephen Ion	563	18.8	−9.6
Labour	Ruman Muhith	451	15.1	−5.9
Green	Kirsty Wilmot	215	7.2	+0.4
Majority		1,202	40.0	+26.9
Rejected ballots		9	0.3	-0.7
Turnout		3003	46.2	−6.9
Registered electors		6,501		+0.5
Liberal Democrats hold		Swing	+14.1	

2021 Ipswich Borough Council election (Thursday 6 May 2021)
Party	Candidate	Votes	%	±%
Liberal Democrats	Oliver Holmes	1,427	41.5	−11.4
Conservative	Deborah Richards	977	28.4	+6.8
Labour	Stefan Long	722	21.0	+5.9
Green	Kirsty Wilmot	235	6.8	−2.5
The Burning Pink Party	Susan Hagley	40	1.2	
Majority		450	13.1	−18.2
Rejected ballots		35	1.0	0
Turnout		3435	53.1	+8.2
Registered electors		6,470		+0.3
Liberal Democrats hold		Swing	-9.1	

=== Ipswich Borough Council Elections in the 2010s ===
2019 Ipswich Borough Council election (Thursday 2 May 2019)
Party	Candidate	Votes	%	±%
Liberal Democrats	Timothy Lockington	1,533	52.9	+2.7
Conservative	Lee Reynolds	627	21.6	−3.1
Labour	Maggie Barradell	439	15.1	−5.6
Green	Kirsty Wilmot	270	9.3	+5.8
Majority		906	31.3	+5.8
Rejected ballots		30	1.0	+0.7
Turnout		2899	45.0	−0.8
Registered electors		6,450		−0.8
Liberal Democrats gain from Conservative		Swing	+2.9	

2018 Ipswich Borough Council election (Thursday 3 May 2018)
Party	Candidate	Votes	%	±%
Liberal Democrats	Inga Lockington	1,493	50.2	+13.0
Conservative	Simon Fisher	734	24.7	−6.5
Labour	Jeremy Brown	615	20.7	+0.2
Green	Kirsty Wilmot	104	3.5	−0.9
Independent	David Tabane	19	0.6	
Majority		759	25.5	+19.5
Rejected ballots		9	0.3	-0.1
Turnout		2975	45.7	−0.9
Registered electors		6,505		+5.6
Liberal Democrats hold		Swing	+9.8	

2016 Ipswich Borough Council election (Thursday 5 May 2016)
Party	Candidate	Votes	%	±%
Liberal Democrats	Oliver Holmes	1,068	37.2	+4.5
Conservative	Stephen Hardman	896	31.2	−6.2
Labour	Steven Reynolds	588	20.5	−1.0
UKIP	Andrew Iddon	178	6.2	−4.8
Green	Kirsty Wilmot	133	4.6	−3.5
Majority		172	6.0	+10.8
Rejected ballots		11	0.4	0
Turnout		2873	46.6	−27.3
Registered electors		6,160		−2.2
Liberal Democrats hold		Swing	+5.4	

2015 Ipswich Borough Council election (Thursday 7 May 2015)
Party	Candidate	Votes	%	±%
Conservative	Lee Reynolds	1,743	37.4	+14.1
Liberal Democrats	Catherine French	1521	32.7	−8.0
Labour	Steven Reynolds	1001	21.5	+3.0
Green	Kirsty Wilmot	377	8.1	+1.9
Majority		222	4.8	+22.1
Rejected ballots		19	0.4	+0.2
Turnout		4658	74.0	+28.3
Registered electors		6,298		+0.4
Conservative gain from Liberal Democrats		Swing	+11.1	

2014 Ipswich Borough Council election (Thursday 22 May 2014)
Party	Candidate	Votes	%	±%
Liberal Democrats	Inga Lockington	1,164	40.7	+4.1
Conservative	Lee Reynolds	668	23.3	−9.3
Labour	Steven Reynolds	528	18.5	−1.8
UKIP	Andrew Iddon	316	11.0	
Green	Kirsty Wilmot	177	6.2	+1.1
Majority		496	17.3	+13.3
Rejected ballots		7	0.2	0
Turnout		2861	45.6	+5.6
Registered electors		6,270		+3.9
Liberal Democrats hold		Swing	+13.4	

2012 Ipswich Borough Council election (Thursday 3 May 2012)
Party	Candidate	Votes	%	±%
Liberal Democrats	Andrew Cann	883	36.6	−5.1
Conservative	Stephen Ion	786	32.6	−5.9
Labour	Scott Huntly	489	20.3	+0.9
Independent	Peter Turtill	128	5.3	
Green	Kirsty Wilmot	124	5.1	
Majority		97	4.0	+0.9
Rejected ballots		4	0.2	-0.2
Turnout		2414	40.0	+4.0
Registered electors		6,035		−3.8
Liberal Democrats hold		Swing	+0.8	

2011 St. Margaret's Ward By-election (Thursday 10 November 2011)
Party	Candidate	Votes	%	±%
Liberal Democrats	Cathy French	942	41.7	+6.7
Conservative	Stephen Ion	871	38.5	+1.6
Labour	Glen Chisholm	439	19.4	−1.8
Majority		71	3.1	+18.8
Rejected ballots		10	0.4	+0.2
Turnout		2261	36.0	−17.8
Registered electors		6,276		+7.0
Liberal Democrats gain from Conservative		Swing	+2.6	

2011 Ipswich Borough Council election (Thursday 5 May 2011)
Party	Candidate	Votes	%	±%
Conservative	Karen Stokes	1,167	36.9	+4.1
Liberal Democrats	Cathy French	1107	35.0	−11.6
Labour	Kimberly Cook	671	21.2	+7.0
Green	Amelia Drayson	211	6.7	+2.8
Majority		60	1.9	+17.6
Rejected ballots		5	0.2	0
Turnout		3161	53.9	−18.3
Registered electors		5,868		−3.4
Conservative gain from Liberal Democrats		Swing	+15.7	

2010 Ipswich Borough Council election (Thursday 6 May 2010)
Party	Candidate	Votes	%	±%
Liberal Democrats	Inga Lockington	2,101	48.5	+6.8
Conservative	Stephen Ion	1,420	32.8	−7.2
Labour	Elizabeth Cooper	613	14.2	+3.0
Green	Amelia Drayson	186	3.9	−3.3
Majority		681	15.7	+14.0
Rejected ballots		9	0.2	
Turnout		4329	72.2	
Registered electors		6,077		
Liberal Democrats hold		Swing	+7.0	

=== Ipswich Borough Council Elections in the 2000s ===
2008 Ipswich Borough Council election (Thursday 1 May 2008)
Party	Candidate	Votes	%	±%
Liberal Democrats	Richard Atkins	1,134	41.7	+3.5
Conservative	Mary Young	1,089	40.0	+3.5
Labour	Elizabeth Cooper	304	11.2	+0.3
Green	Amelia Drayson	195	7.2	+0.3
Majority		45	1.7	+0.1
Turnout		2722		
Liberal Democrats hold		Swing	+3.5	

2007 Ipswich Borough Council election (Thursday 3 May 2007)
Party	Candidate	Votes	%	±%
Liberal Democrats	John Cooper	1,011	38.2	−12.2
Conservative	Sophie Stanbrook	968	36.5	+3.7
Labour	Steve Buckingham	289	10.9	+1.0
Independent	Leonard Woolf	199	7.5	
Green	Amy Drayson	183	6.9	−0.1
Majority		43	1.6	−15.9
Turnout		2650		
Liberal Democrats hold		Swing	-8.0	

2006 Ipswich Borough Council election (Thursday 4 May 2006)
Party	Candidate	Votes	%	±%
Liberal Democrats	Inga Lockington	1,426	50.4	+2.5
Conservative	Andrew Booth	929	32.8	−7.3
Labour	William Knowles	280	9.9	−2.8
Green	Amelia Drayson	197	7.0	
Majority		497	17.5	+9.7
Turnout		2832		
Liberal Democrats hold		Swing	+9.8	

2004 Ipswich Borough Council election (Thursday 10 June 2004)
Party	Candidate	Votes	%	±%
Liberal Democrats	Richard Atkins	1,336	47.9	+1.9
Conservative	David Brown	1,119	40.1	−0.9
Labour	Jane Shaw	337	12.1	−0.9
Majority		217	7.8	+2.8
Turnout		2792		
Liberal Democrats hold		Swing	+1.4	

2003 Ipswich Borough Council election (Thursday 1 May 2003)
Party	Candidate	Votes	%	±%
Liberal Democrats	John Cooper	1,211	46.0	
Conservative	David Brown	1,079	41.0	
Labour	Jane Shaw	341	13.0	
Majority		132	5.0	
Turnout		2631		
Liberal Democrats hold		Swing		

2002 Ipswich Borough Council election (Thursday 2 May 2002)
Party	Candidate	Votes	%	±%
Liberal Democrats	Inga Lockington	1,366		
Liberal Democrats	Richard Atkins	1,222		
Liberal Democrats	John Cooper	1,191		
Conservative	David Brown	1,093		
Conservative	Jeffrey Stansfield	1,049		
Conservative	Carike Keggett	993		
Labour	Jane Shaw	386		
Labour	Adele Cook	382		
Labour	Steve Reynold	380		
Majority				
Turnout				

== Suffolk County Council Elections ==
2021 Suffolk County Council election (Thursday 6 May 2021)
Party	Candidate	Votes	%	±%
Liberal Democrats	Inga Lockington	2,590		
Conservative	Deborah Richards	2,195		
Labour	Maria Carreiro	1989		
Liberal Democrats	Oliver Holmes	1840		
Labour	Stefan Long	1517		
Green	Kirsy Wilmot	965		
The Burning Pink Party	Tina Smith	168		
Majority				
Rejected ballots		34		
Turnout		6612	42.7	
Registered electors		15,503		

2017 Suffolk County Council election (Thursday 4 May 2017)
Party	Candidate	Votes	%	±%
Liberal Democrats	Inga Lockington	2,284		
Conservative	Christopher Chambers	1,954		
Labour	Sarah Adams	1897		
Liberal Democrats	Oliver Holmes	1869		
Conservative	Lee Reynolds	1697		
Labour	Janice Parry	1541		
Green	Kirsy Wilmot	323		
Green	John Mann	287		
Majority				
Rejected ballots		9		
Turnout		6103	40.0	
Registered electors		15,180		

2013 Suffolk County Council election (Thursday 2 May 2013)
Party	Candidate	Votes	%	±%
Labour	Sarah Adams	1,668		
Liberal Democrats	Inga Lockington	1,457		
Labour	Robert Bridgeman	1441		
Conservative	Lee Reynolds	1355		
Conservative	Christopher Stewart	1257		
Liberal Democrats	Catherine French	1211		
UKIP	John Chapman	823		
Green	John Mann	481		
Majority				
Rejected ballots		9		
Turnout		5134	33.8	
Registered electors		15,195		

2009 Suffolk County Council election (Thursday 4 June 2009)
Party	Candidate	Votes	%	±%
Liberal Democrats	Inga Lockington	2,409		
Liberal Democrats	Andrew Cann	2,375		
Conservative	Sophie Stanbrook	1853		
Conservative	Janet Sibley	1773		
Labour	Elizabeth Cooper	811		
Labour	Carole Jones	787		
Green	Amy Drayson	774		
Majority				
Rejected ballots				
Turnout				
Registered electors				

2005 Suffolk County Council election (Thursday 5 May 2005)
Party	Candidate	Votes	%	±%
Liberal Democrats	Andrew Cann	3,301		
Liberal Democrats	Inga Lockington	3,181		
Conservative	Julia Schubert	2684		
Conservative	Priscilla Steed	2681		
Labour	Keith Herod	2352		
Labour	Noel Tostevin	1914		
Majority				
Rejected ballots				
Turnout				
Registered electors				

== Notable buildings in St Margaret's Ward ==
- Christchurch Mansion in Christchurch Park
