= 2000 Ipswich Borough Council election =

2000 UK local government election

- 4 May 2000

One third of seats 25 seats needed for a majority
| | First party | Second party | Third party |
|---|---|---|---|
| Party | Labour | Conservative | Liberal Democrats |
| Last election | 35 | 10 | 1 |
| Seats won | 7 | 8 | 1 |
| Seats after | 31 | 15 | 2 |
| Seat change | ▼5 | ▲5 | ▲1 |
| Popular vote | | | 25.8% |
Council control before election
Labour
Council control after election
Labour

Elections for Ipswich Borough Council were held on 4 May 2000. One third of the council was up for election and the Labour Party kept overall control of the council.

After the election, the composition of the council was:

- Labour 31
- Conservative 15
- Liberal Democrat 2

== Election result ==
Ipswich local election result 2000
| Party | Seats | Gains | Losses | Net gain/loss | Seats % | Votes % | Votes | +/− |
|---|---|---|---|---|---|---|---|---|
| Labour | 9 | | | -5 | 50.0 | | | |
| Conservative | 8 | | | +5 | 44.4 | | | |
| Liberal Democrats | 1 | | | +1 | 5.6 | | | |
| Independent | 0 | | | -1 | 0 | | | |

== Ward results ==
=== Bixley ===
Bixley
| Party | Candidate | Votes | % |
|---|---|---|---|
| Conservative | Gordon Terry | 1,136 | 64.4 |
| Labour | Colin Campbell | 409 | 23.2 |
| Liberal Democrats | J. Shirley | 218 | 12.4 |
| Turnout | | 1,763 | 30.2 |

=== Bridge ===
Bridge
| Party | Candidate | Votes | % |
|---|---|---|---|
| Labour | D. Turnbull | 621 | 51.4 |
| Conservative | Ms K. Kenna | 434 | 35.9 |
| Liberal Democrats | D. Cartwright | 153 | 12.7 |
| Turnout | | 1,208 | 21.0 |

=== Broom Hill ===
Broom Hill
| Party | Candidate | Votes | % |
|---|---|---|---|
| Conservative | David Goldsmith | 751 | 56.3 |
| Labour | Ms C. Le Grys | 415 | 31.1 |
| Liberal Democrats | M. Bardsley | 168 | 12.6 |
| Turnout | | 1,334 | 26.1 |

=== Castle Hill ===
Castle Hill
| Party | Candidate | Votes | % | ±% |
|---|---|---|---|---|
| Conservative | D. Ward | 1,115 | 60.3 | |
| Labour | G. Manuel | 521 | 28.2 | |
| Liberal Democrats | Dennis Day | 213 | 11.5 | |
| Turnout | | 1,848 | 26.0 | |
