= Westgate Mall (Madison) =

Shopping center in Madison, Wisconsin

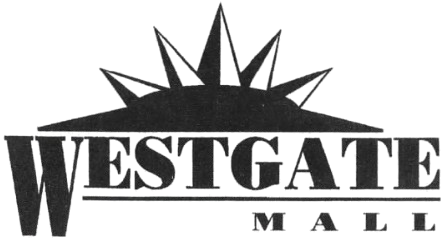
- Location: Madison, Wisconsin
- Coordinates: 43.0523°N 89.4716°W
- Opened: March 24, 1960
- Closed: 2021
- Developer: MJV Corporation
- Architect: Erie Building Company
- Floors: 1

Westgate Mall was a shopping mall located in Madison, Wisconsin. It opened in 1960 and was demolished in 2021.

== History ==
The Westgate Mall would open as the open air Westgate Shopping Center on March 24, 1960. It would open with JCPenney and Montgomery Ward. It was also developed by the MJV Corporation, and built by the Erie Building Company. Both company's were based out of Cleveland. sometime in the late 60s to early 70s, the mall was enclosed.
