= 2019 Ipswich Borough Council election =

2019 UK local government election

- 2 May 2019

16 seats (out of 48 seats) 25 seats needed for a majority
	First party	Second party	Third party
Party	Labour	Conservative	Liberal Democrats
Seats before	34	12	2
Seats won	36	9	3
Seat change	▲2	▼3	▲1
Popular vote	11,834	8,943	3,497
Percentage	40.1%	30.3%	11.8%
Swing	▼8.4%	▼5.7%	▲1.8%
- Map showing the May 2019 local election results in Ipswich.
Council control before election
Labour
Council control after election
Labour

The 2019 Ipswich Borough Council elections for the Ipswich Borough Council took place on 2 May: 16 seats were contested - one in each of the 16 wards and also on 26 September when a by-election took place where 1 seat was contested (Alexandra Ward).

== Results summary ==
2019 Ipswich Borough Council election
Party	This election				Full council			This election		
Party	Candidates	Seats	Net	Seats %	Other	Total	Total %	Votes	Votes %	+/−
Labour	{{{candidates}}}	11	▲2	68.8	25	36	75.0	11,834	40.1	-8.3
Conservative	{{{candidates}}}	4	▼3	25.0	5	9	18.8	8,943	30.3	-6.5
Liberal Democrats	{{{candidates}}}	1	▲1	6.3	2	3	6.3	3,497	11.8	+1.7
Green	{{{candidates}}}	0	Steady	0.0	0	0	0.0	2,742	9.3	+6.0
UKIP	{{{candidates}}}	0	Steady	0.0	0	0	0.0	2,275	7.7	+6.3
Independent	{{{candidates}}}	0	Steady	0.0	0	0	0.0	252	0.9	+0.8

== Ward results ==
These are the results for all 16 wards.

=== Alexandra ===
Alexandra
Party	Candidate	Votes	%	±%
Labour	Jane Riley	1,034	53.7	−6.1
Conservative	Katherine West	379	19.7	−4.3
Green	Tom Wilmot	341	17.7	+8.6
Liberal Democrats	Henry Williams	172	8.9	+1.8
Majority		655	34.0	
Turnout		1,926	28.18	
Labour hold		Swing		

=== Bixley ===
Bixley
Party	Candidate	Votes	%	±%
Conservative	Richard Pope	1,026	50.1	−9.0
Labour	Paul Anderson	522	25.5	−6.8
Green	Lesley Packwood	326	15.9	New
Liberal Democrats	Robert Chambers	173	8.5	−0.1
Majority		504	24.6	
Turnout		2,047	36.25	
Conservative hold		Swing		

=== Bridge ===
Bridge
Party	Candidate	Votes	%	±%
Labour	Philip Smart	738	44.8	−14.8
Conservative	Murray Brunning	351	21.3	−7.7
UKIP	Catherine Kersey	250	15.2	New
Green	Charlotte Armstrong	221	13.4	+6.0
Liberal Democrats	Immo Weichert	87	5.3	+1.3
Majority		387	23.5	
Turnout		1,647	25.54	
Labour hold		Swing		

=== Castle Hill ===
Castle Hill
Party	Candidate	Votes	%	±%
Conservative	Erion Xhaferaj	876	51.6	−1.4
Labour	John Harris	511	30.1	−5.7
Liberal Democrats	Sophie Willians	311	18.3	+7.1
Majority		365	21.5	
Turnout		1,698	30.36	
Conservative hold		Swing		

=== Gainsborough ===
Gainsborough
Party	Candidate	Votes	%	±%
Labour	Martin Cook	736	45.3	−8.8
UKIP	Shayne Pooley	384	23.7	+13.6
Conservative	Joshua Owens	359	22.1	−8.4
Green	Brieanna Patmore	92	5.7	+2.1
Liberal Democrats	Robin Whitmore	52	3.2	+1.4
Majority		352	21.6	
Turnout		1,623	26.33	
Labour hold		Swing		

=== Gipping ===
Gipping
Party	Candidate	Votes	%	±%
Labour	Peter Gardiner	738	48.1	−12.1
Conservative	Paul Cawthorn	344	22.4	−9.1
UKIP	Karl Pickering	212	13.8	New
Green	Nigel Storry	127	8.3	New
Liberal Democrats	Gerald Pryke	112	7.3	−1.0
Majority		394	25.7	
Turnout		1,533	22.40	
Labour hold		Swing		

=== Holywells ===
Holywells
Party	Candidate	Votes	%	±%
Conservative	Elizabeth Harsant	918	44.9	+0.6
Labour	Shofik Ali	733	35.9	−10.3
Green	Jennifer Rivett	272	13.3	+7.3
Liberal Democrats	Paul Daley	120	5.9	+2.5
Majority		185	9.0	
Turnout		2,043	35.87	
Conservative hold		Swing		

=== Priory Heath ===
Priory Heath
Party	Candidate	Votes	%	±%
Labour	Luke Richardson	925	46.8	−7.4
Conservative	Samantha Murray	538	27.2	−8.2
Independent	Christopher Newbury	252	12.8	New
Green	Andrew Patmore	153	7.7	+2.4
Liberal Democrats	Lucy Drake	108	5.5	+0.4
Majority		387	19.6	
Turnout		1,976	30.05	
Labour hold		Swing		

=== Rushmere ===
Rushmere
Party	Candidate	Votes	%	±%
Labour	Kelvin Cracknell	935	43.0	−14.0
Conservative	Stephen Ion	812	37.4	+1.4
Green	Lee Morris	256	11.8	New
Liberal Democrats	Nicholas Jacob	169	7.8	+0.8
Majority		123	5.6	
Turnout		2,172	35.37	
Labour gain from Conservative		Swing		

=== Sprites ===
Sprites
Party	Candidate	Votes	%	±%
Labour	Jennifer Smith	717	48.8	−10.2
Conservative	Michael Scanes	414	28.2	−3.0
UKIP	Julie Hassell	210	14.3	+6.3
Green	Adria Pittock	67	4.6	New
Liberal Democrats	Conrad Packwood	60	4.1	+2.1
Majority		303	20.6	
Turnout		1,468	28.68	
Labour hold		Swing		

=== St John's ===
St John's
Party	Candidate	Votes	%	±%
Labour	Michelle Darwin	1,030	48.6	−6.5
Conservative	Mark Phillips	474	22.4	−10.4
UKIP	Josephine Grant	251	11.9	New
Green	Judith Hook	236	11.1	+6.0
Liberal Democrats	Edward Packwood	127	6.0	−1.0
Majority		556	26.2	
Turnout		2,118	32.24	
Labour hold		Swing		

=== St Margaret's ===
St Margaret's
Party	Candidate	Votes	%	±%
Liberal Democrats	Timothy Lockington	1,533	53.4	+3.0
Conservative	Lee Reynolds	627	21.9	−2.9
Labour	Maggie Barradell	439	15.3	−5.4
Green	Kirsty Wilmot	270	9.4	+5.9
Majority		906	31.5	
Turnout		2,869	44.95	
Liberal Democrats gain from Conservative		Swing		

=== Stoke Park ===
Stoke Park
Party	Candidate	Votes	%	±%
Conservative	Robert Hall	684	39.7	−13.8
Labour	Tony Blacker	615	35.7	−3.5
UKIP	Alan Cotterell	240	13.9	New
Green	Barry Broom	110	6.4	+1.8
Liberal Democrats	Maureen Haaker	72	4.2	+1.6
Majority		69	4.0	
Turnout		1,721	35.7	
Conservative hold		Swing		

=== Westgate ===
Westgate
Party	Candidate	Votes	%	±%
Labour Co-op	Julian Gibbs	807	50.6	−6.6
Conservative	Christopher Chambers	301	18.9	−8.1
UKIP	Mark Schueller	186	11.7	New
Green	John Mann	170	10.7	+3.7
Liberal Democrats	Martin Hore	132	8.3	−0.5
Majority		506	31.7	
Turnout		1,596	24.97	
Labour Co-op hold		Swing		

=== Whitehouse ===
Whitehouse
Party	Candidate	Votes	%	±%
Labour	Lucinda Trenchard	578	42.3	−14.9
Conservative	Stephen Lark	288	21.1	−7.2
UKIP	Colin Gould	283	20.7	+10.9
Liberal Democrats	Michelle Brown	117	8.6	+3.9
Green	Edmund Harrison	101	7.4	New
Majority		290	21.2	
Turnout		1,367	21.96	
Labour hold		Swing		

=== Whitton ===
Whitton
Party	Candidate	Votes	%	±%
Labour	Darren Heaps	776	44.6	−8.0
Conservative	John Downie	552	31.7	−10.9
UKIP	David Hurlbut	259	14.9	New
Liberal Democrats	Daniel Davey	152	8.7	+3.8
Majority		224	12.9	
Turnout		1,739	29.37	
Labour gain from Conservative		Swing		

== By-Elections ==
=== Alexandra By-Election ===
Alexandra
Party	Candidate	Votes	%	±%
Labour	Adam Rae	734	50.2	−3.7
Liberal Democrats	Henry Williams	287	19.6	+10.3
Conservative	Lee Reynolds	278	19.0	−6.2
Green	Tom Wilmot	164	11.2	−0.4
Majority		447	30.6	
Turnout		1,471	21	
Labour hold		Swing		
