= List of places in Alaska (W) =

This list of cities, towns, unincorporated communities, counties, and other recognized places in the U.S. state of Alaska also includes information on the number and names of counties in which the place lies, and its lower and upper zip code bounds, if applicable.

Name of place	Number of counties	Principal county	Lower zip code	Upper zip code
Wacker	1	Ketchikan Gateway Borough		
Wade Hampton	1	Kusilvak Census Area		
Wainwright	1	North Slope Borough	99782	
Wales	1	Nome Census Area	99783	
Ward Cove	1	Ketchikan Gateway Borough	99928	
Warm Chuck	1	Prince of Wales-Outer Census Area		
Wasilla	1	Matanuska-Susitna Borough	99687	
Waterfall	1	Prince of Wales-Outer Census Area	99901	
Wells	1	Haines Borough		
Westgate	1	Fairbanks North Star Borough	99701	
West Juneau	1	City and Borough of Juneau	99801	
West Petersburg	1	Wrangell-Petersburg Census Area		
Wevok	1	North Slope Borough		
Whale Pass	1	Prince of Wales-Outer Census Area		
White Mountain	1	Nome Census Area	99784	
Whitestone Logging Camp	1	Skagway-Hoonah-Angoon Census Area		
Whitney	1	Municipality of Anchorage	99506	
Whittier	1	Valdez-Cordova Census Area	99693	
Wildwood Air Force Station	1	Kenai Peninsula Borough	98728	
Wildwood Station	1	Kenai Peninsula Borough		
Wiley Post-Will Rogers Memorial Airport	1	North Slope Borough	99723	
Willow	1	Matanuska-Susitna Borough	99688	
Willow Creek	1	Valdez-Cordova Census Area		
Willow Lake	1	Matanuska-Susitna Borough		
Wilson Village	1	Municipality of Anchorage		
Windham Post Office	1	Skagway-Hoonah-Angoon Census Area		
Windy	1	Yukon-Koyukuk Census Area		
Wiseman	1	Yukon-Koyukuk Census Area	99726	
Wiseman	1	Yukon-Koyukuk Census Area		
Womens Bay	1	Kodiak Island Borough		
Woodchopper	1	Yukon-Koyukuk Census Area		
Wood River	1	Dillingham Census Area	99576	
Woodrow	1	Kenai Peninsula Borough		
Woody Island	1	Kodiak Island Borough	99615	
Wortmanns	1	Valdez-Cordova Census Area		
Wrangell	1	Wrangell-Petersburg Census Area	99929	
Wrangell	1	Wrangell-Petersburg Census Area		
Wrangell Airport	1	Wrangell-Petersburg Census Area	99929	
Wrangell City School District	1	Wrangell-Petersburg Census Area		
Wrangell Narrows	1	Wrangell-Petersburg Census Area		
Wrangell-Petersburg	1	Wrangell-Petersburg Census Area		
Wrangell – St. Elias National Park and Preserve	3	Southeast Fairbanks Census Area	99501	
Wrangell – St. Elias National Park and Preserve	3	Valdez-Cordova Census Area	99501	
Wrangell – St. Elias National Park and Preserve	3	City and Borough of Yakutat	99501	
