= Giles Penny =

British sculptor and painter

Giles Penny (born 1962) is an English sculptor and painter. He has created many public sculptures by commission, which stand in locations in Britain.

== Life ==
Penny was born in Dorset. He attended the Heatherley School of Fine Art in Chelsea, the Bournemouth and Poole College of Art and the Newport College of Art.

In the late 1980s he completed two portrait commissions, of Richard Branson and Anita Roddick, and afterwards became artist-in-residence at Anita Roddick's The Body Shop, creating many sculptures for the grounds of the company's headquarters in Littlehampton. He has exhibited in England and France, including in 2023 at an exhibition of works by several sculptors in the gardens of Ashridge House, Hertfordshire.

He was elected in 1994 an Associate of the Royal Society of Sculptors. In 2017, he was elected an Academician of the Royal West of England Academy.

== Works ==
Penny has written that "when I reflect on my work over the past forty years I've found it's the idea in conjunction with the making that completes the experience." He acknowledges the influence of Giacomo Manzù. His works include the following:

"Man with Arms Open" in West India Avenue, Canary Wharf, and "Two Men on a Bench" in Wren Landing, Canary Wharf, are bronze sculptures dating from 1995. After they were shown in 1999 in the millennium exhibition The Shape of the Century; they were purchased by the Canary Wharf Group.

"Man and Ball", of 1995, is a bronze sculpture, height 1.84 metres (6 ft 0 in), commissioned by Ransomes Europark in Ipswich, where it is situated.

"Man and Animal", of 2004, is a bronze sculpture, height 2 metres (6 ft 7 in), in Camomile Walk, Portishead, Somerset. It was commissioned by Crest Nicholson.

== Gallery ==
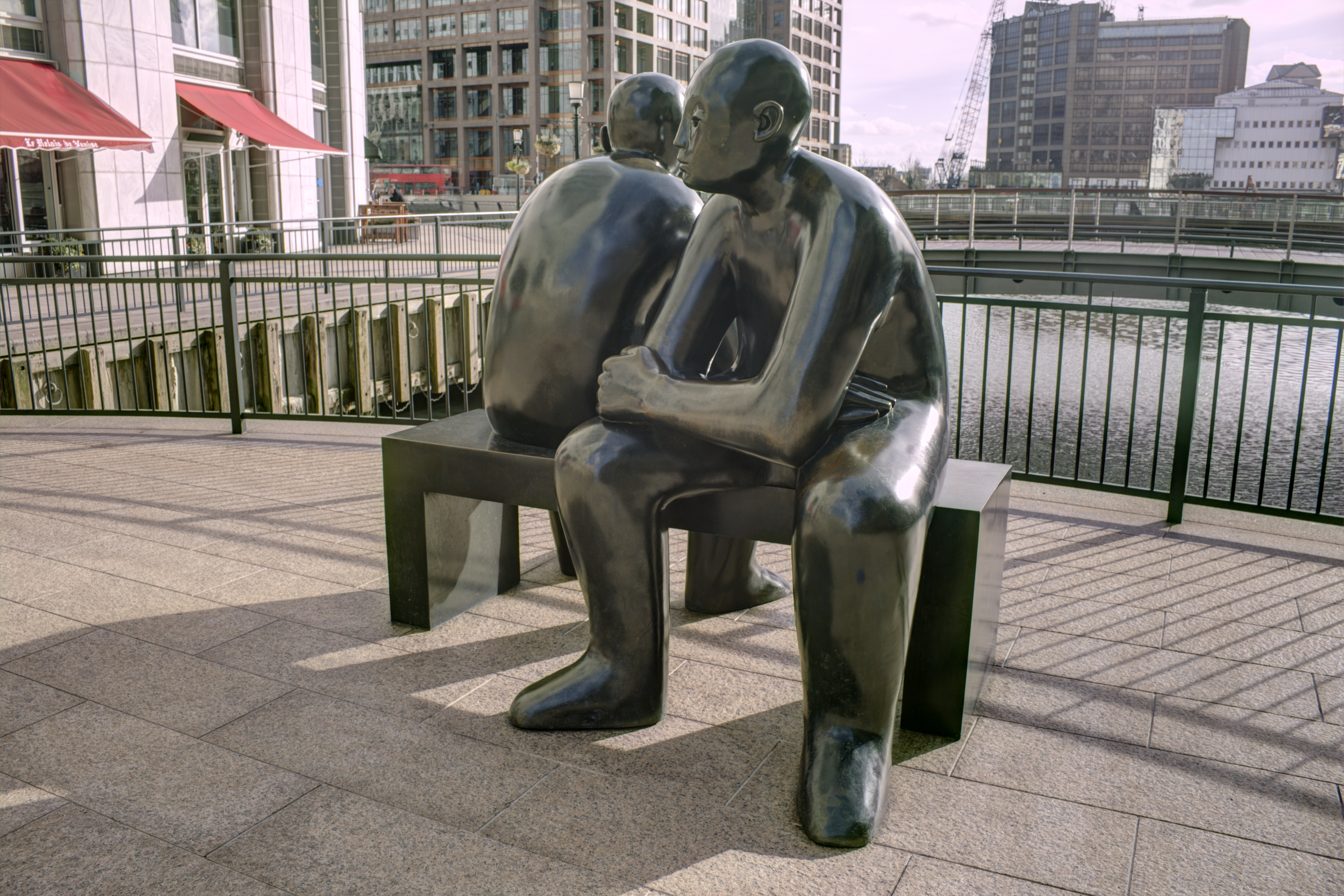
Two Men on a Bench, at Wren Landing, Canary Wharf, London

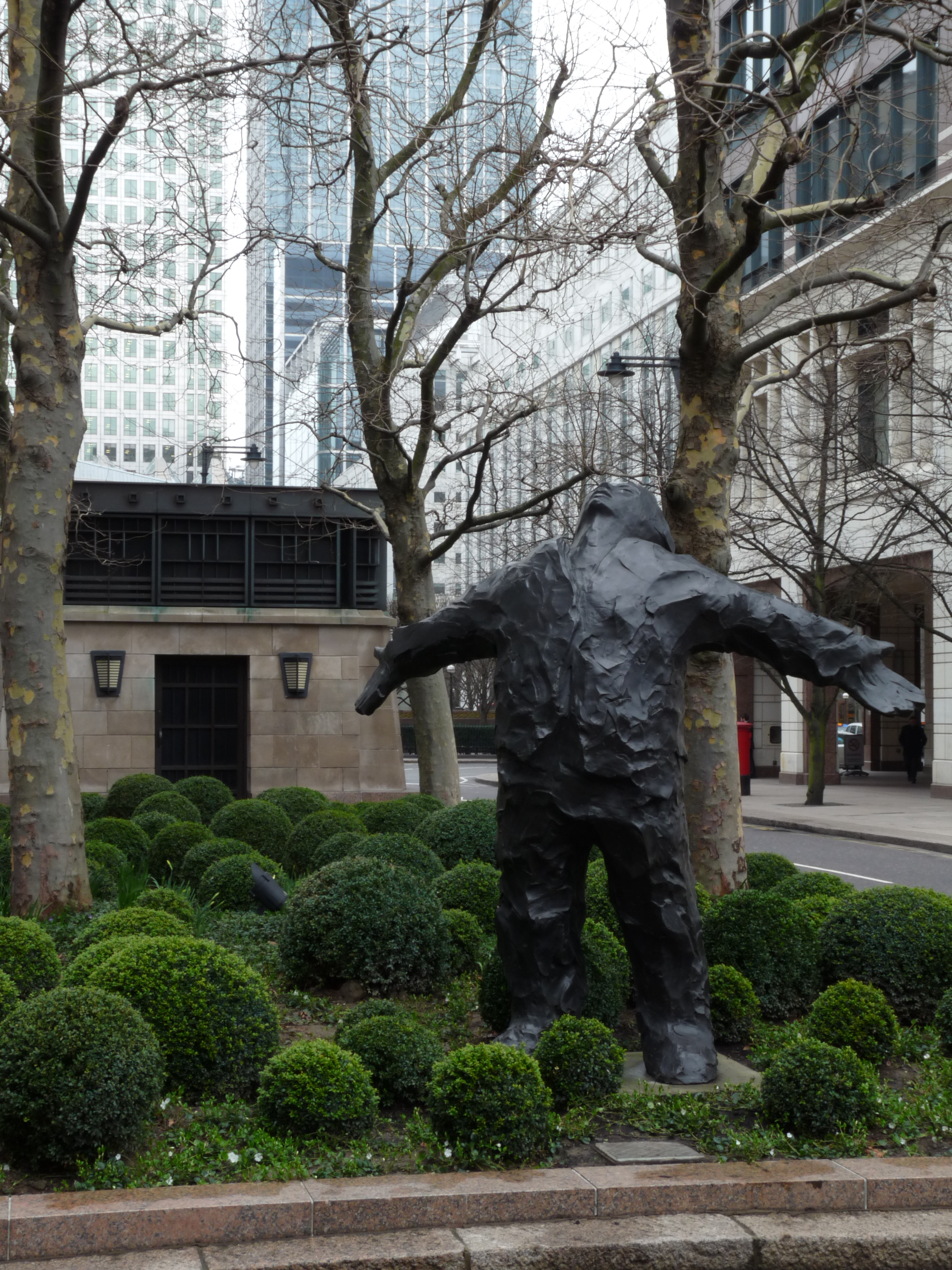
Man With Arms Open, at West India Avenue, Canary Wharf

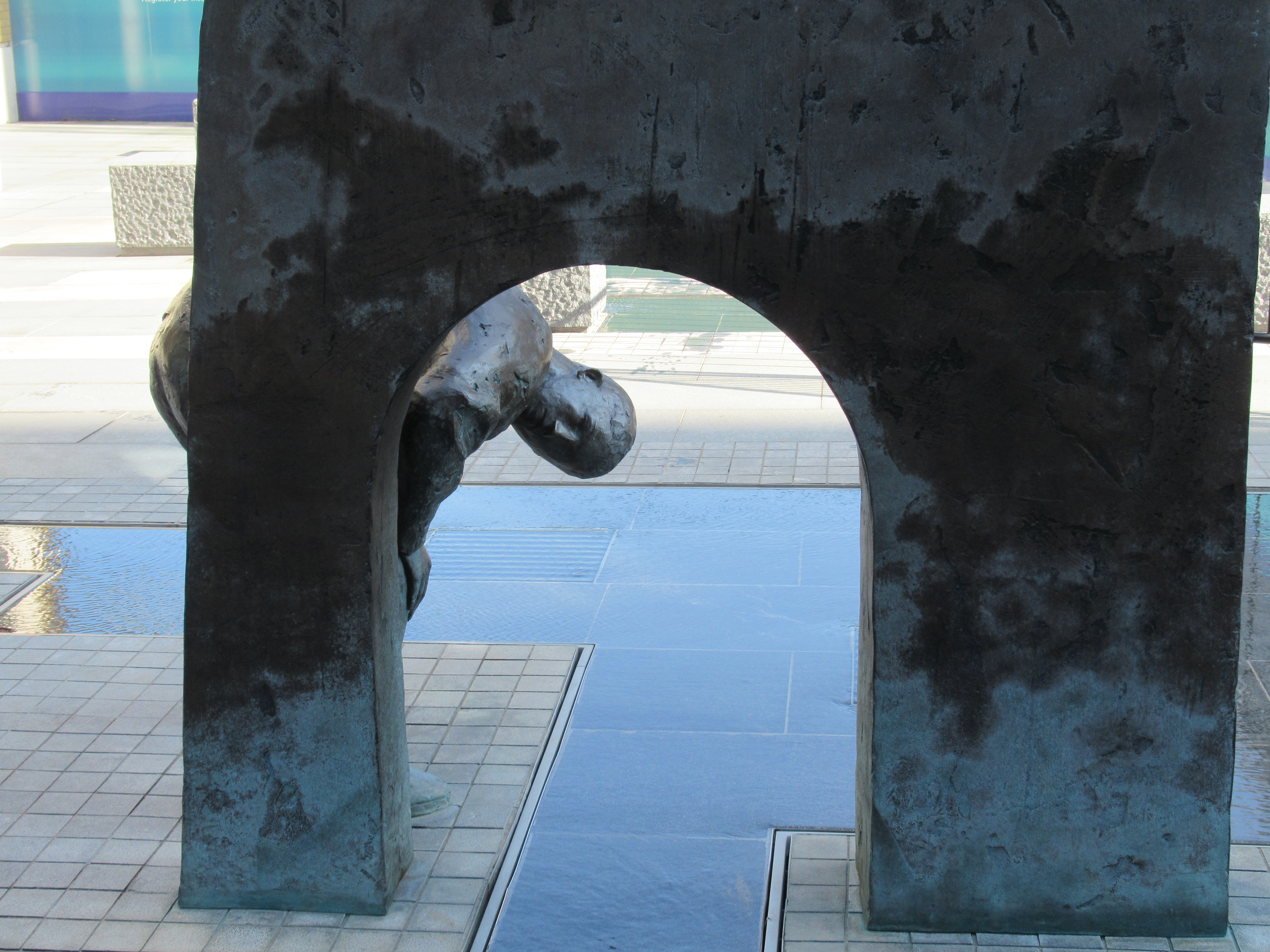
Man and Arch, at Fulham Reach, London, commissioned by St. George Central London Ltd.

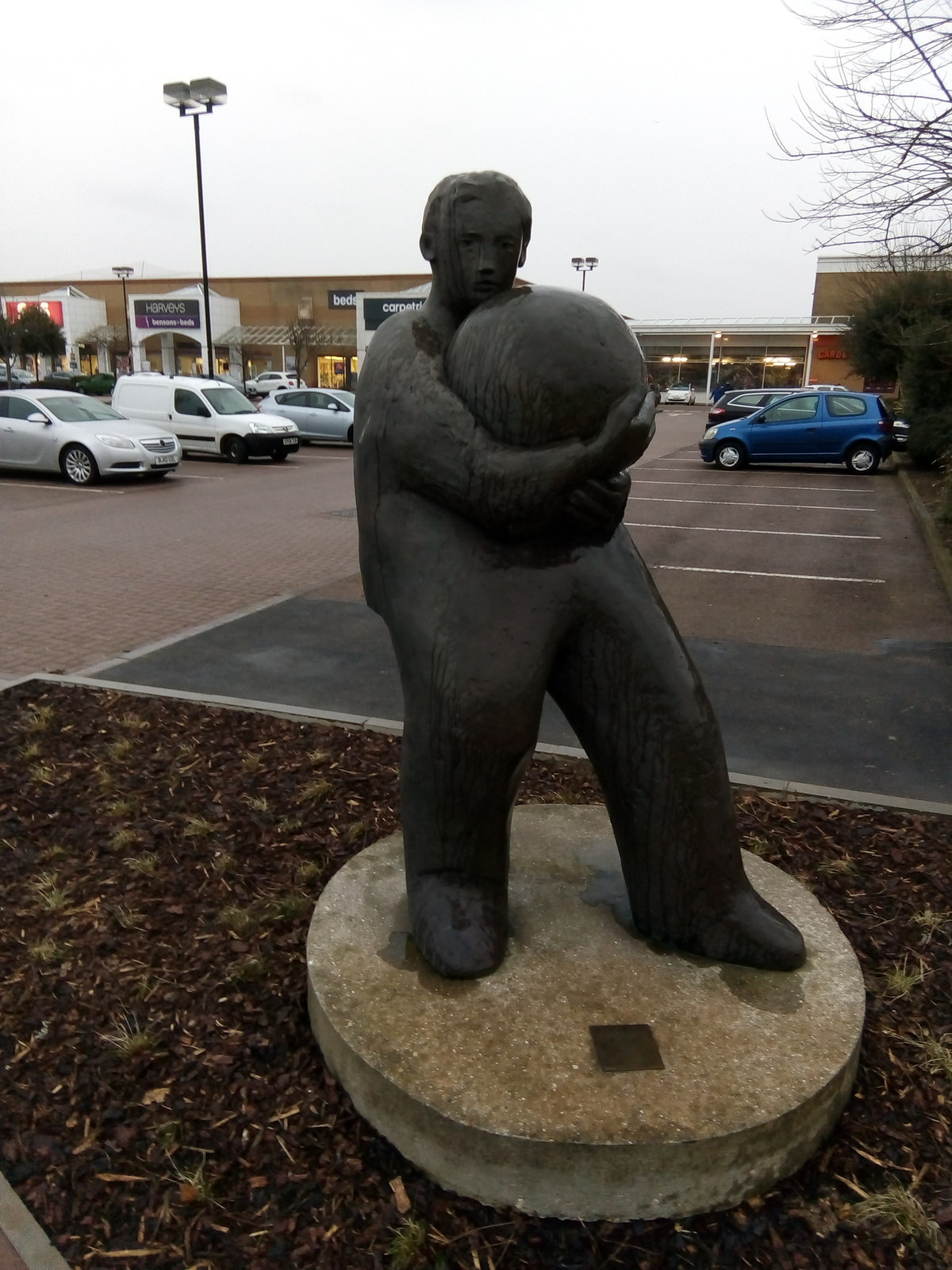
Man and Ball, at Ransomes Europark, Ipswich

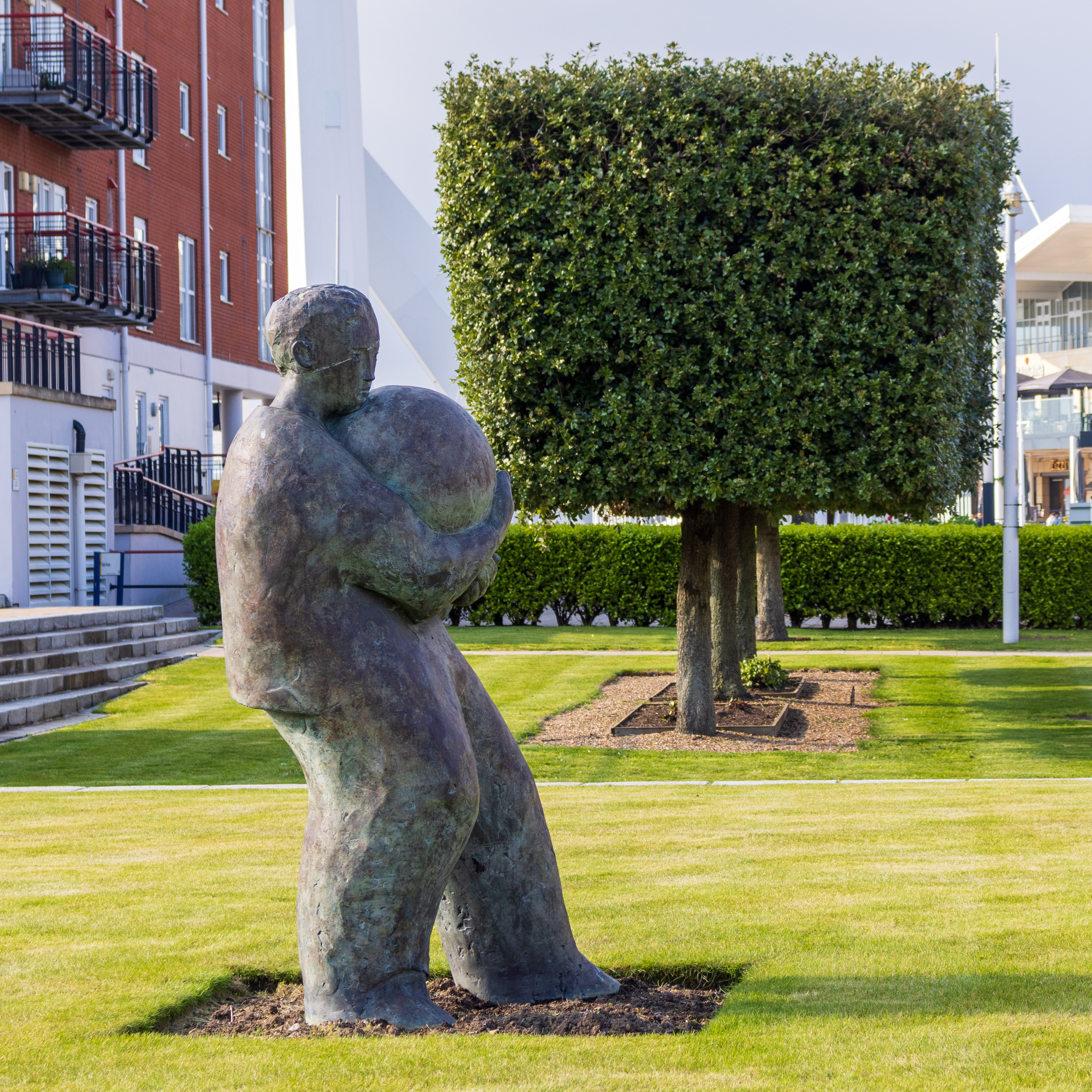
Man and Globe, at Gunwharf Quays, Portsmouth

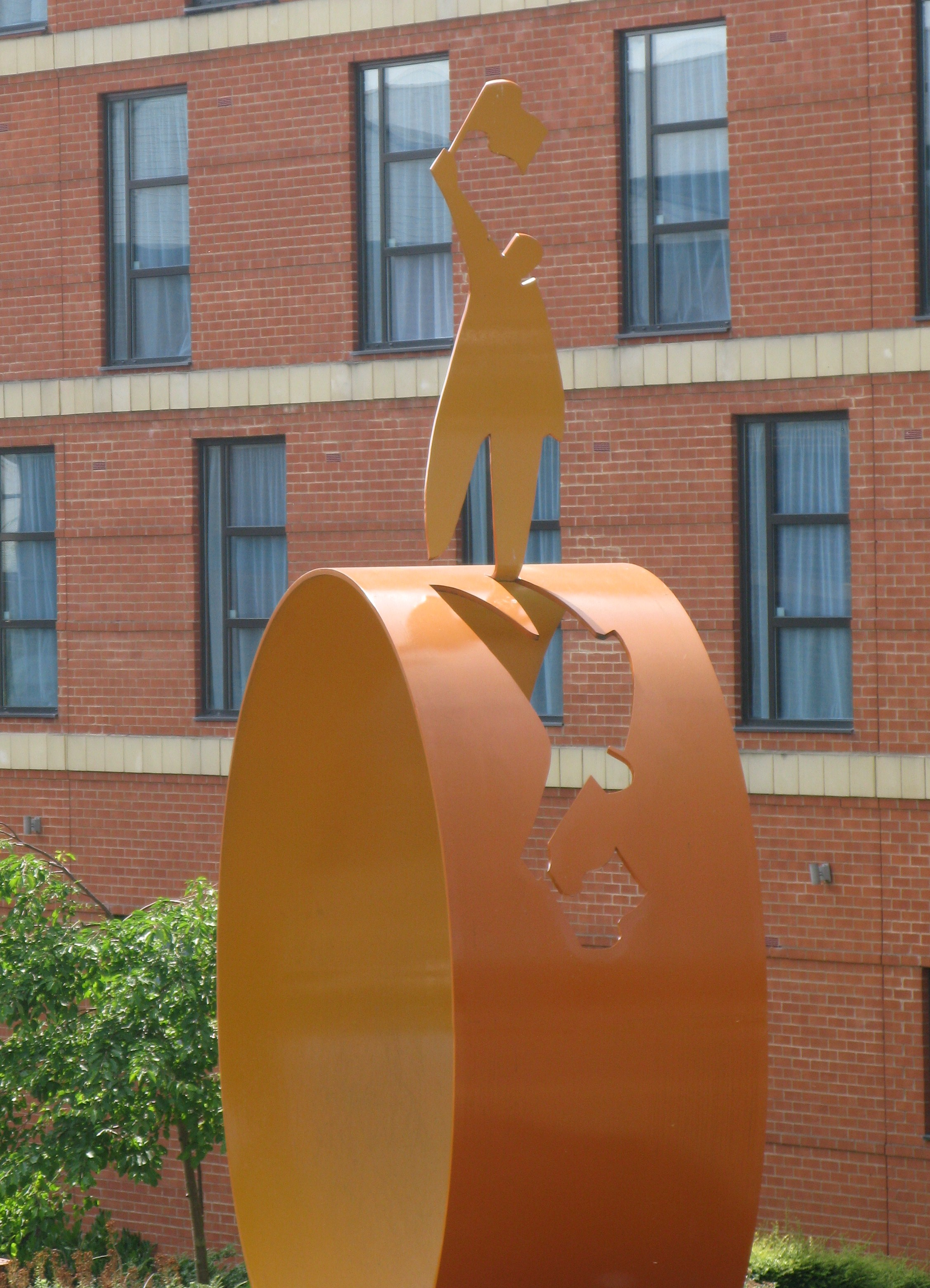
Signalman, Wolverhampton
