= Westgate (surname) =

Westgate is an English surname. Notable people with the surname include:

- Brandon Westgate (born 1989), American skateboarder
- Murray Westgate (1918–2018), Canadian actor
- Ross Westgate (born 1967), English journalist and businessman
