= Ransomes Industrial Estate =

Industrial Estate in Ipswich

Coordinates: 52.0302°N 1.2110°E

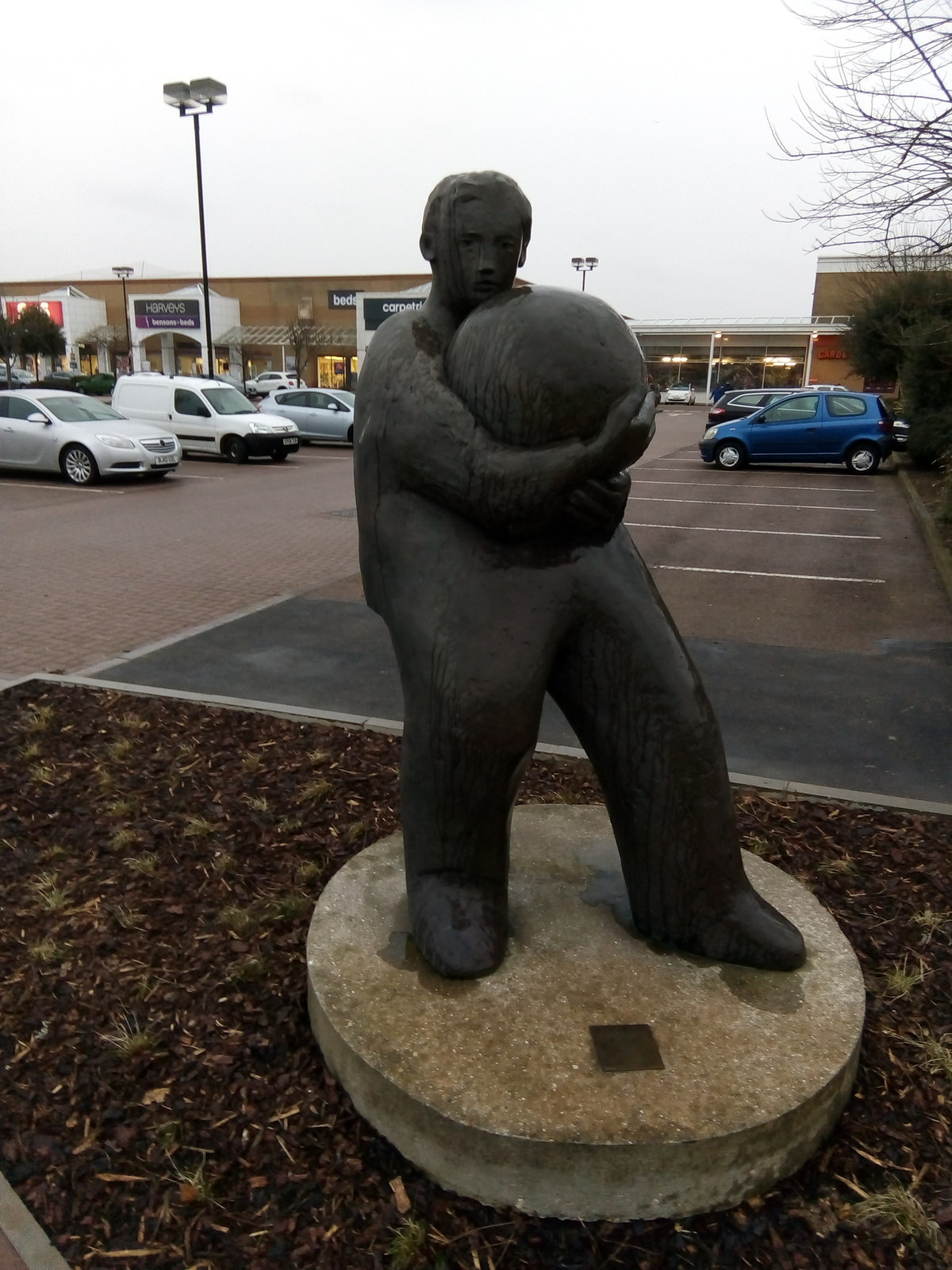
Man and Ball, sculpture by Giles Penny commissioned by Ransomes Industrial Estate and situated in the park

Ransomes Industrial Estate, also known as Ransomes Europark, is a combined retail and business park located in Priory Heath Ward, Ipswich, on the southeastern edge of Ipswich, Suffolk, UK. It is named after Ransomes, Sims & Jefferies, which still maintains a presence on the park.

Primarily the park is home to light industrial and logistics companies, although there is a growing number of retailers and offices, including the headquarters of KDM International and MSC UK.

In February 2008, it was announced that IKEA was in talks to take on part of the estate occupied by Crane Fluid Systems for a new store.
