= North West Area, Ipswich =

Administrative area of Ipswich, England

Coordinates: 52°04′44″N 1°07′33″E

The North West Area, Ipswich is one of five administrative areas in Ipswich, through which Ipswich Borough Council divides its spending and enables feedback from local residents, businesses and community groups.

The area is composed of three wards, each represented by three councillors. Each ward is also a Middle Layer Super Output Area (MSOA). As of the 2019 Ipswich Borough Council election, the councillors are as follows:

Ward	Councillor	Councillor	Councillor	MSOA
Castle Hill	Ian Fisher	Sam Murray	Erion Xhaferaj	Ipswich 002
Whitehouse	Tracy Grant	Colin Wright	Lucinda Trenchard	Ipswich 003
Whitton	Patricia Bruce-Browne	Christine Shaw	Darren Heaps	Ipswich 001

These Councillors form the North West Area Committee of which Colin Wright is the chair.

The area is also covered by a Neighbourhood Watch network which comprises 35 neighbourhood watch schemes.
