= The Westgate School, Slough =

Coordinates: 51.5140°N 0.6282°W

The Westgate School

Location
- Cippenham Lane; Cippenham; Slough, Berkshire, SL1 5AH; England

Information
- Type: Academy
- Motto: "Equipped for life"
- Established: September 1958
- Founder: Jonathan Kirk
- Local authority: Slough Borough Council
- Department for Education URN: 138012 Tables
- Ofsted: Reports
- Headteacher: Jon Gargan
- Gender: Coeducational
- Age: 11 to 18
- Enrolment: 1145
- Website: https://www.westgate.slough.sch.uk/

The Westgate School is a co-educational secondary school with academy status in the Cippenham area of the town of Slough in the English county of Berkshire. It educates around 900 pupils.

The school celebrated its 60th anniversary on 27 September 2018.
