= 2002 Ipswich Borough Council election =

2002 election results for Ipswich Borough Council

← 2000	2 May 2002	2003 →

All 48 seats 25 seats needed for a majority
	First party	Second party	Third party
Party	Labour	Conservative	Liberal Democrats
Last election	31	15	2
Seats won	35	9	4
Seat change	▲4	▼6	▲2
Popular vote	11,501	10,522	6,201
Percentage	39.8%	36.4%	21.5%
- Map showing the 2002 local election results in Ipswich.
Council control before election
Labour
Council control after election
Labour

The 2002 Ipswich Borough Council election was an election for Ipswich Borough Council held on 2 May 2002. The whole council was up for election with boundary changes since the last election in 2000. The Labour Party kept overall control of the council.

== Election result ==
Election apportionment diagram

2002 Ipswich local election result
Party	Seats	Gains	Losses	Net gain/loss	Seats %	Votes %	Votes	+/−
Labour	35			+3	72.9	41.1	33,082	
Conservative	9			-4	18.8	37.4	30,150	
Liberal Democrats	4			+1	8.3	20.7	16,675	
CPA	0			0	0	0.6	519	
Green	0			0	0	0.2	143	

== Ward results ==
=== Alexandra ===
Alexandra (3 seats)
Party	Candidate	Votes	%
Labour	Penelope Breakwell	794	
Labour	Maureen Carrington-Brown	720	
Liberal Democrats	Jane Chambers	687	
Liberal Democrats	Kenneth Toye	675	
Labour	Dianne Hosking	672	
Liberal Democrats	Robin Whitmore	651	
Conservative	Susan Rush	355	
Conservative	Maureen Springle	328	
Conservative	Margaret Saunders	316	
Turnout		5,198	

=== Bixley ===
Bixley (3 seats)
Party	Candidate	Votes	%
Conservative	William Wright	1,285	
Conservative	Gordon Terry	1,220	
Conservative	Stephen Barker	1,199	
Liberal Democrats	Adam Beaton	522	
Labour	Colin Campbell	502	
Labour	Susan Maguire	463	
Liberal Democrats	John Rivett	451	
Labour	Susan Smart	450	
Liberal Democrats	Brian Fearnley	354	
CPA	Dave Cooper	220	
Turnout		6,666	

=== Bridge ===
Bridge (3 seats)
Party	Candidate	Votes	%
Labour	James Powell	764	
Labour	Harold Mangar	690	
Labour	Philip Smart	676	
Conservative	Andrew Booth	402	
Conservative	Albie Kingham	382	
Conservative	Maureen Mott	376	
Liberal Democrats	Elisabeth Williams	248	
Liberal Democrats	Juliet Lloyd	246	
Liberal Democrats	Denise Earle	221	
Turnout		4,005	

=== Castle Hill ===
Castle Hill (3 seats)
Party	Candidate	Votes	%
Conservative	Henry Davies	1,160	
Conservative	Dale Jackson	1,079	
Conservative	David Goldsmith	1,053	
Labour	Mary Manuel	653	
Labour	James Adams	573	
Labour	Peter Shaw	528	
Liberal Democrats	Nina Day	361	
Liberal Democrats	John Goodall	264	
Liberal Democrats	Clive Whitter	235	
Turnout		5,906	

=== Gainsborough ===
Gainsborough (3 seats)
Party	Candidate	Votes	%
Labour	Sally Brown	902	
Labour	John Mowles	892	
Labour	Don Edwards	883	
Conservative	William Cook	453	
Conservative	Keith Matthews	423	
Conservative	Nico Mott	405	
Liberal Democrats	Louise Gooch	164	
Liberal Democrats	Nicholas Jacob	138	
Liberal Democrats	Charles Tracy	127	
Turnout		4,387	

=== Gipping ===
Gipping (3 seats)
Party	Candidate	Votes	%
Labour	Jeanette Macartney	776	
Labour	David Ellesmere	754	
Labour	Peter Gardiner	753	
Conservative	Michael Irvine	369	
Conservative	Helen Last	347	
Conservative	Robert Strutt	333	
Liberal Democrats	Jill Atkins	224	
Liberal Democrats	Donald Perkins	202	
Liberal Democrats	Amy Luke	194	
Turnout		3,952	

=== Holywells ===
Holywells (3 seats)
Party	Candidate	Votes	%
Conservative	George Debman	792	
Conservative	David Hale	760	
Conservative	Elizabeth Harsant	745	
Labour	John Cook	532	
Labour	Robert Daines	506	
Labour	Richard Kirby	477	
Liberal Democrats	Catherine Chambers	254	
Liberal Democrats	Velina Walden	206	
Liberal Democrats	Bob Zablok	184	
Turnout		4,456	

=== Priory Heath ===
Priory Heath (3 seats)
Party	Candidate	Votes	%
Labour	Bradley Maguire	603	
Labour	William Quinton	601	
Labour	Dale Jabbar	588	
Conservative	Sarah Dodwell	412	
Conservative	Peter Rush	369	
Conservative	Benjamin Redsell	359	
Liberal Democrats	Frank Atkins	231	
Liberal Democrats	Catherine French	220	
Liberal Democrats	Martin Pakes	194	
Turnout		3,577	

=== Rushmere ===
Rushmere (3 seats)
Party	Candidate	Votes	%
Labour	Robert Ray-Dobson	924	
Labour	Keith Herod	868	
Labour	David Isaacs	842	
Conservative	Mark Rush	838	
Conservative	Stephen Ion	823	
Conservative	Keith Wood	767	
Liberal Democrats	Gillian Auton	467	
Liberal Democrats	Roberta Kerslake	400	
Liberal Democrats	Graham Lucas	333	
CPA	Stephen Bloomfield	182	
Turnout		6,444	

=== St Johns ===
St Johns (3 seats)
Party	Candidate	Votes	%
Labour	Alexander Martin	892	
Labour	Elizabeth Cooper	875	
Labour	Neil MacDonald	868	
Conservative	Stephen Cook	740	
Conservative	Edward Phillips	698	
Conservative	Carlton Vajzovic	637	
Liberal Democrats	Elizabeth Hubbard	316	
Liberal Democrats	David Kitchen	267	
Liberal Democrats	John Whitear	233	
Green	Jack Phipps	143	
CPA	Gavin Stone	117	
Turnout		5,786	

=== St Margaret's ===
St Margaret's (3 seats)
Party	Candidate	Votes	%
Liberal Democrats	Inga Lockington	1,366	
Liberal Democrats	Richard Atkins	1,222	
Liberal Democrats	John Cooper	1,191	
Conservative	David Brown	1,093	
Conservative	Jeffrey Stansfield	1,049	
Conservative	Carole Leggett	993	
Labour	Jane Shaw	386	
Labour	Adele Cook	382	
Labour	Steve Reynolds	380	
Turnout		8,062	

=== Sprites ===
Sprites (3 seats)
Party	Candidate	Votes	%
Labour	Ian Grimwood	915	
Labour	Richard Risebrow	860	
Labour	John Le Grys	858	
Conservative	Bob Hall	529	
Conservative	Roy Dovaston	511	
Conservative	Kathleen Kenna	507	
Liberal Democrats	Gwynne Chipperfield	226	
Liberal Democrats	Philip Richardson	217	
Liberal Democrats	James Williams	201	
Turnout		4,824	

=== Stoke Park ===
Stoke Park (3 seats)
Party	Candidate	Votes	%
Labour	Roger Fern	754	
Labour	Barry Studd	738	
Labour	Keith Rawlingson	730	
Conservative	Duncan Titchmarsh	638	
Conservative	Paul West	638	
Conservative	Don Ward	616	
Liberal Democrats	David Mullett	267	
Liberal Democrats	Catherine Stafford	219	
Liberal Democrats	Tim Starkey	211	
Turnout		4,811	

=== Westgate ===
Westgate (3 seats)
Party	Candidate	Votes	%
Labour	Mary Blake	716	
Labour	John Harris	654	
Labour	Martin Cook	651	
Conservative	Julia Schubert	414	
Conservative	Stella Fuller	393	
Conservative	Robert Watson	381	
Liberal Democrats	Dennis Day	256	
Liberal Democrats	Timothy Lockington	248	
Liberal Democrats	Cynthia Toye	238	
Turnout		3,951	

=== Whitehouse ===
Whitehouse (3 seats)
Party	Candidate	Votes	%
Labour	Albert Grant	574	
Labour	Trevor Payne	561	
Labour	Christopher Newbury	513	
Liberal Democrats	George King	364	
Conservative	Colin Morgan	356	
Conservative	Mary Young	322	
Conservative	Tracy Rivers	313	
Liberal Democrats	Charlie Blue	281	
Liberal Democrats	Michael Higgins	246	
Turnout		3,530	

=== Whitton ===
Whitton (3 seats)
Party	Candidate	Votes	%
Labour	George Clarke	814	
Labour	Graham Manuel	809	
Labour	Martyn Green	766	
Conservative	Sandie Doyle	686	
Conservative	Neville Jackson	649	
Conservative	Stephen Lark	637	
Liberal Democrats	Adrian Brown	248	
Liberal Democrats	Santa Richardson	210	
Liberal Democrats	Julie Fletcher	195	
Turnout		5,014	
