= 2006 Ipswich Borough Council election =

2006 UK local government election

| ← 2004 | 4 May 2006 | 2007 → |

16 of the 48 seats 25 seats needed for a majority
| | First party | Second party |
|---|---|---|
| Party | Conservative | Labour |
| Last election | 18 | 23 |
| Seats before | 16 | 23 |
| Seats won | 7 | 6 |
| Seats after | 19 | 18 |
| Seat change | ▲3 | ▼5 |
| Popular vote | 12,817 | 10,278 |
| Percentage | 39.8% | 31.9% |
| Swing | ▼0.6% | ▼0.2% |
| | Third party | Fourth party |
| Party | Liberal Democrats | Independent |
| Last election | 7 | 0 |
| Seats before | 7 | 2 |
| Seats won | 3 | 0 |
| Seats after | 9 | 2 |
| Seat change | ▲2 | Steady |
| Popular vote | 8,198 | 125 |
| Percentage | 25.5% | 0.4% |
| Swing | ▼0.5% | 0.0% |
- Map showing the 2006 local election results in Ipswich.
Council control before election
Labour Party (UK)
Council control after election
Labour Party (UK)

Elections for Ipswich Borough Council were held on 4 May 2006. One third of the council was up for election and the council stayed under no overall control with the Conservative-Liberal Democrat coalition continuing.

After the election, the composition of the council was:

- Conservative 19
- Labour 18
- Liberal Democrat 9
- Independent 2

== Election result ==
Ipswich local election result 2006
| Party | Seats | Gains | Losses | Net gain/loss | Seats % | Votes % | Votes | +/− |
|---|---|---|---|---|---|---|---|---|
| Conservative | 7 | 3 | 0 | +3 | 43.8 | 39.8 | 12,817 | -0.6 |
| Labour | 6 | 0 | 5 | -5 | 37.5 | 31.9 | 10,278 | -0.2 |
| Liberal Democrats | 3 | 2 | 0 | +2 | 18.8 | 25.5 | 8,198 | -0.5 |
| Green | 0 | 0 | 0 | 0 | 0.0 | 2.2 | 696 | +2.2 |
| Independent | 0 | 0 | 0 | 0 | 0.0 | 0.4 | 125 | 0.0 |
| Monster Raving Loony | 0 | 0 | 0 | 0 | 0.0 | 0.3 | 88 | +0.1 |

== Ward results ==
=== Alexandra ===
Alexandra
| Party | Candidate | Votes | % | ±% |
|---|---|---|---|---|
| Liberal Democrats | Philip Green | 734 | 37.4 | −3.8 |
| Labour | Elizabeth Cooper | 603 | 30.7 | −3.3 |
| Conservative | Edward Phillips | 413 | 21.0 | −3.8 |
| Green | John Taylor | 213 | 10.9 | +10.9 |
| Majority | | 131 | 6.7 | −0.5 |
| Turnout | | 1,963 | 33.4 | |
| Liberal Democrats gain from Labour | | Swing | | |

=== Bixley ===
Bixley
| Party | Candidate | Votes | % | ±% |
|---|---|---|---|---|
| Conservative | William Wright | 1,438 | 62.8 | +9.0 |
| Liberal Democrats | Gareth Jones | 503 | 22.0 | −6.6 |
| Labour | Barry Studd | 347 | 15.2 | +1.0 |
| Majority | | 935 | 40.8 | +15.6 |
| Turnout | | 2,288 | 39.2 | |
| Conservative hold | | Swing | | |

=== Bridge ===
Bridge
| Party | Candidate | Votes | % | ±% |
|---|---|---|---|---|
| Labour | James Powell | 786 | 46.7 | +8.1 |
| Conservative | Richard Pope | 602 | 35.7 | −4.0 |
| Liberal Democrats | Christine Chambers | 296 | 17.6 | −4.1 |
| Majority | | 184 | 11.0 | |
| Turnout | | 1,684 | 29.3 | |
| Labour hold | | Swing | | |

=== Castle Hill ===
Castle Hill
| Party | Candidate | Votes | % | ±% |
|---|---|---|---|---|
| Conservative | Henry Davies | 1,411 | 59.7 | +3.9 |
| Liberal Democrats | Nigel Cheeseman | 502 | 21.2 | −0.8 |
| Labour | John Harris | 451 | 19.1 | −3.1 |
| Majority | | 909 | 38.5 | +4.9 |
| Turnout | | 2,364 | 39.7 | |
| Conservative hold | | Swing | | |

=== Gainsborough ===
Gainsborough
| Party | Candidate | Votes | % | ±% |
|---|---|---|---|---|
| Labour | June Brown | 842 | 47.3 | +2.4 |
| Conservative | Kevern Mulley | 569 | 31.9 | +0.9 |
| Liberal Democrats | Robin Whitmore | 283 | 15.9 | −0.9 |
| Monster Raving Loony | Paul Billingham | 88 | 4.9 | +0.8 |
| Majority | | 273 | 15.4 | +1.5 |
| Turnout | | 1,782 | 28.9 | |
| Labour hold | | Swing | | |

=== Gipping ===
Gipping
| Party | Candidate | Votes | % | ±% |
|---|---|---|---|---|
| Labour | Jeannette MacArtney | 724 | 45.1 | +1.1 |
| Conservative | Maureen Springle | 554 | 34.5 | +4.5 |
| Liberal Democrats | Dafydd Taylor | 329 | 20.5 | −5.5 |
| Majority | | 170 | 10.6 | −2.4 |
| Turnout | | 1,607 | 27.9 | |
| Labour hold | | Swing | | |

=== Holywells ===
Holywells
| Party | Candidate | Votes | % | ±% |
|---|---|---|---|---|
| Conservative | George Debman | 802 | 47.3 | −2.2 |
| Liberal Democrats | Robert Chambers | 520 | 30.6 | +8.9 |
| Labour | Steve Buckingham | 375 | 22.1 | −6.8 |
| Majority | | 282 | 16.7 | −3.9 |
| Turnout | | 1,697 | 34.5 | |
| Conservative hold | | Swing | | |

=== Priory Heath ===
Priory Heath
| Party | Candidate | Votes | % | ±% |
|---|---|---|---|---|
| Labour | John Cook | 704 | 39.9 | −2.3 |
| Conservative | Michelle Bevan-Margetts | 626 | 35.5 | −1.6 |
| Liberal Democrats | Jill Atkins | 308 | 17.5 | −3.2 |
| Independent | Sally Wainman | 125 | 7.1 | +7.1 |
| Majority | | 78 | 4.4 | −0.7 |
| Turnout | | 1,763 | 30.0 | |
| Labour hold | | Swing | | |

=== Rushmere ===
Rushmere
| Party | Candidate | Votes | % | ±% |
|---|---|---|---|---|
| Conservative | Denise Terry | 982 | 40.6 | |
| Labour | Alasdair Ross | 805 | 33.3 | |
| Liberal Democrats | Catherine French | 630 | 26.1 | |
| Majority | | 177 | 7.3 | |
| Turnout | | 2,417 | 39.6 | |
| Conservative hold | | Swing | | |

=== Sprites ===
Sprites
| Party | Candidate | Votes | % | ±% |
|---|---|---|---|---|
| Conservative | Robert Hall | 926 | 46.7 | +4.9 |
| Labour | Ian Grimwood | 841 | 42.4 | −0.8 |
| Liberal Democrats | John Whitear | 215 | 10.8 | −4.2 |
| Majority | | 85 | 4.3 | |
| Turnout | | 1,982 | 36.3 | |
| Conservative gain from Labour | | Swing | | |

=== St John's ===
St John's
| Party | Candidate | Votes | % | ±% |
|---|---|---|---|---|
| Labour | Alexander Martin | 946 | 39.2 | +2.2 |
| Conservative | Gavin Maclure | 826 | 34.2 | −5.0 |
| Liberal Democrats | Howard Stanley | 493 | 20.4 | −3.4 |
| Green | Lois Hickey | 150 | 6.2 | +6.2 |
| Majority | | 120 | 5.0 | |
| Turnout | | 2,415 | 39.9 | |
| Labour hold | | Swing | | |

=== St Margaret's ===
St Margaret's
| Party | Candidate | Votes | % | ±% |
|---|---|---|---|---|
| Liberal Democrats | Inga Lockington | 1,426 | 50.4 | +2.5 |
| Conservative | Andrew Booth | 929 | 32.8 | −7.3 |
| Labour | William Knowles | 280 | 9.9 | −2.2 |
| Green | Amelia Drayson | 197 | 7.0 | +7.0 |
| Majority | | 497 | 17.6 | +9.8 |
| Turnout | | 2,832 | 47.4 | |
| Liberal Democrats hold | | Swing | | |

=== Stoke Park ===
Stoke Park
| Party | Candidate | Votes | % | ±% |
|---|---|---|---|---|
| Conservative | Nadia Cenci | 847 | 47.6 | −0.4 |
| Labour | Roger Fern | 655 | 36.8 | +4.1 |
| Liberal Democrats | Adrian Brown | 277 | 15.6 | −3.6 |
| Majority | | 192 | 10.8 | −4.5 |
| Turnout | | 1,779 | 31.5 | |
| Conservative gain from Labour | | Swing | | |

=== Westgate ===
Westgate
| Party | Candidate | Votes | % | ±% |
|---|---|---|---|---|
| Labour | Mary Blake | 670 | 35.8 | −1.0 |
| Liberal Democrats | Andrew Cann | 650 | 34.7 | +7.3 |
| Conservative | Clare Disney | 418 | 22.3 | −5.6 |
| Green | Colin Rodgers | 136 | 7.3 | +7.3 |
| Majority | | 20 | 1.1 | −7.8 |
| Turnout | | 1,874 | 30.4 | |
| Labour hold | | Swing | | |

=== Whitehouse ===
Whitehouse
| Party | Candidate | Votes | % | ±% |
|---|---|---|---|---|
| Liberal Democrats | Stephen Williams | 757 | 44.4 | +9.4 |
| Labour | Albert Grant | 544 | 31.9 | −2.6 |
| Conservative | Christopher Stewart | 405 | 23.7 | −6.8 |
| Majority | | 213 | 12.5 | +12.0 |
| Turnout | | 1,706 | 29.7 | |
| Liberal Democrats gain from Labour | | Swing | | |

=== Whitton ===
Whitton
| Party | Candidate | Votes | % | ±% |
|---|---|---|---|---|
| Conservative | Steven Wells | 1,069 | 52.2 | +7.9 |
| Labour | George Clarke | 705 | 34.4 | −1.2 |
| Liberal Democrats | Sally Scott | 275 | 13.4 | −6.7 |
| Majority | | 364 | 17.8 | +9.1 |
| Turnout | | 2,049 | 34.4 | |
| Conservative gain from Labour | | Swing | | |
