= Stoke Park Ward, Ipswich =

Ward in Ipswich

Stoke Park
- ward for Ipswich Council
- Local government in East of England: Suffolk
- Electorate: 5160

Current ward
- Created: 2002
- Councillor: Tony Blacker (Labour)
- Councillor: Rhys Ellis (Conservative)
- Councillor: Nathan Wilson (Conservative)

Stoke Park Ward is a ward in the South West Area of Ipswich, Suffolk, England. It returns three councillors to Ipswich Borough Council.

It is designated Middle Layer Super Output Area Ipswich 015 by the Office for National Statistics. It is composed of 5 Lower Layer Super Output Areas.

== Ward profile, 2008 ==
Stoke Park Ward is located to the south of central Ipswich. In 2005 it had a population of about 7,100. In many ways it is quite representative of Ipswich as a whole .
