= Sprites Ward, Ipswich =

Ward in Ipswich

Sprites Ward
- ward for Ipswich Council
- Local government in East of England: Suffolk
- Electorate: 5080

Current ward
- Created: 2002
- Councillor: Colin Smart (Labour)
- Councillor: Jenny Smith (Labour)
- Councillor: Philip McSweeney (Labour)

Sprites Ward is a ward in the South West Area of Ipswich, Suffolk, England. It returns three councillors to Ipswich Borough Council.

It is designated Middle Layer Super Output Area Ipswich 013 by the Office for National Statistics. It is composed of 5 Lower Layer Super Output Areas.

Stephen Flood was elected to represent the conservative Party in 2021. He was expelled in October 2022 following an investigation conducted by the Ipswich Conservative Association, following complaints about Islamophobia.
