= Whitehouse Ward, Ipswich =

Ward of the borough of Ipswich, Suffolk, United Kingdom

Coordinates: 52°4′38″N 1°6′56″E

Whitehouse
- ward for Ipswich Council
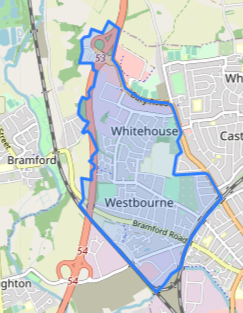
- Boundary of Whitehouse in Ipswich from 2019.
- Local government in East of England: Suffolk

Current ward
- Created: 2002
- Councillor: Glen Chisholm (Labour)
- Councillor: Colin Wright (Labour)
- Councillor: Lucinda Trenchard (Labour)

Whitehouse Ward is a ward in the North West Area of the town and district of Ipswich in the English county of Suffolk. It returns three councillors to Ipswich Borough Council.

It is designated Middle Layer Super Output Area Ipswich 003 by the Office for National Statistics. It is composed of 5 Lower Layer Super Output Areas.

== History ==
The area was developed as a council housing in the 1950s and 60s. It has been extended by private housing development since the 1980s and now has a mix of housing.

The White House itself, next to White House Park, was a substantial country house on the edge of the village – until it became absorbed into Ipswich as the town grew during the first half of the 20th century. It can be accessed from Limerick Close. It is listed Grade II which still stands on the edge of the White House estate. It also boasts a gate lodge on Norwich Road. Built as small country house in the late 17th century and altered early 19th century with late 19th-century additions. It retains its complete 17th century roof structure. It was used for many years as local government offices.

Lovetofts Drive: running north from the end of Bramford Lane to Whitehouse Road is named after John de Lovetoft who had a grant of free warren there in 1277 and died in 1295. There was a manor house known as Lovetofts Hall and a nearby farmhouse which was still shown on the 1955 Ordnance Survey map, but had disappeared by the 1959 map.

== Amenities ==
The area is the main catchment for Westbourne Sports College (Secondary), which is fed by Primary feeder schools, Springfield and Whitehouse Junior School. A small shopping arcade serves the area. The local pub is the Flying Horse.

== Ward profile, 2008 ==
Whitehouse Ward is located at the north western edge of Ipswich. In 2005 it had a population of about 7,600. The population is slightly younger than the Ipswich average with a high proportion of young families.
