= Whitton Ward, Ipswich =

Electoral ward in Ipswich, Suffolk, England

Whitton
- ward for Ipswich Council
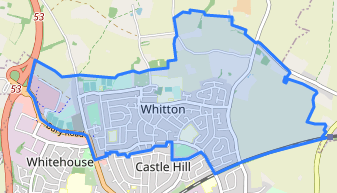
- Boundary of Whitton in Ipswich from 2019.
- Local government in East of England: Suffolk
- Electorate: 6190

Current ward
- Created: 2002
- Councillor: Patricia Bruce Brown (Labour)
- Councillor: Christine Shaw (Labour)
- Councillor: Darren Heaps (Labour)

Whitton Ward is a ward in the North West Area of Ipswich, Suffolk, England. It returns three councillors to Ipswich Borough Council.

It is designated Middle Layer Super Output Area Ipswich 001 by the Office for National Statistics. It is composed of 5 Lower Layer Super Output Areas.

== Ward profile, 2008 ==
Whitton Ward is located at the north western edge of Ipswich. In 2005 it had a population of almost 8,000. The area has more than the Ipswich average number of households with children.
