= Westgate Ward, Ipswich =

Electoral ward of Ipswich, Suffolk, England

Westgate
- ward for Ipswich Council
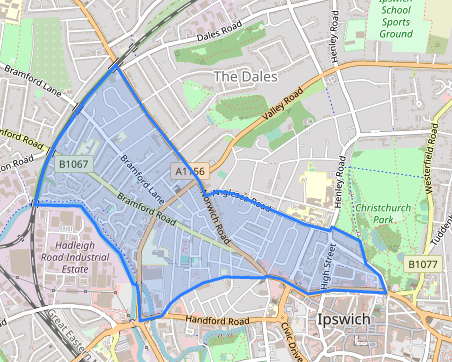
- Boundary of Westgate in Ipswich from 2019.
- Local government in East of England: Suffolk

Current ward
- Created: 2002
- Councillor: Julian Gibbs (Labour)
- Councillor: Colin Kreidewolf (Labour)
- Councillor: Caroline Jones (Labour)

Westgate Ward is a ward in the central Area of Ipswich, Suffolk, England. It returns three councillors to Ipswich Borough Council.

It is designated Middle Layer Super Output Area Ipswich 006 by the Office for National Statistics. It is composed of 5 Lower Layer Super Output Areas.

== Ward profile, 2008 ==
Westgate Ward is located to the north western of Ipswich town centre. In 2005 it had a population of a little over 8,400. At that time a relatively high proportion of the residents were adults living alone
