= Ipswich Borough Council elections =

Local government elections in Suffolk, England

Ipswich Borough Council elections are held three years out of every four to elect members of Ipswich Borough Council in Suffolk, England. Since the last boundary changes in 2002 the council has comprised 48 councillors representing 16 wards with each ward electing three councillors.

== Council elections ==
Composition of the council
Year	Labour	Conservative	Reform	Liberal Democrats (Note: Includes totals for the predecessors of the Liberal Democrats, the Liberal Party and SDP (both of which participated in the Alliance).)	Green (Note: Includes totals for the predecessors of the Greens, the Ecology Party and the Green Party.)	Independents & Others	Council control after election
Local government reorganisation; council established (47 seats)
1973	36	11	-	0	-	0	Labour
1976	26	21	-	0	0	0	Labour
New ward boundaries (48 seats)
1979	29	19	-	0	0	0	Labour
1980	32	16	-	0	0	0	Labour
1982	32	16	-	0	0	0	Labour
1983	31	17	-	0	0	0	Labour
1984	30	18	-	0	0	0	Labour
1986	32	16	-	0	0	0	Labour
1987	33	15	-	0	0	0	Labour
1988	34	14	-	0	0	0	Labour
1990	36	12	-	0	0	0	Labour
1991	37	11	-	0	0	0	Labour
1992	33	15	-	0	0	0	Labour
1994	33	14	-	1	0	0	Labour
1995	36	11	-	1	0	0	Labour
1996	41	6	-	1	0	0	Labour
1998	40	8	-	0	0	0	Labour
1999	37	10	-	1	0	0	Labour
2000	31	15	-	2	0	0	Labour
New ward boundaries (48 seats)
2002	35	9	-	4	0	0	Labour
2003	31	12	-	5	0	0	Labour
2004	23	18	-	7	0	0	No overall control
2006	18	19	-	9	0	2	No overall control
2007	18	20	-	9	0	1	No overall control
2008	21	19	-	8	0	0	No overall control
2010	23	18	-	7	0	0	No overall control
2011	28	16	-	4	0	0	Labour
2012	32	12	-	4	0	0	Labour
2014	35	10	-	3	0	0	Labour
2015	31	15	-	2	0	0	Labour
2016	33	13	-	2	0	0	Labour
2018	34	12	-	2	0	0	Labour
2019	36	9	-	3	0	0	Labour
2021	30	15	0	3	0	0	Labour
2022	32	13	0	3	0	0	Labour
2023	33	10	0	3	0	2	Labour
2024	38	7	0	3	0	0	Labour
2026	29	5	10	3	1	0	Labour

== Result maps ==
1979 results map

1980 results map

1982 results map

1983 results map

1984 results map

1986 results map

1987 results map

1988 results map

1990 results map

1991 results map

1992 results map

1994 results map

1995 results map

2002 results map

2003 results map

2004 results map

2006 results map

2007 results map

2008 results map

2010 results map

2011 results map

2012 results map

2014 results map

2015 results map

2016 results map

2018 results map

2019 results map

2021 results map

2022 results map

2023 results map

2024 results map

2026 results map

== Election apportionment diagrams ==
2002 Election apportionment diagram

2003 Election apportionment diagram

2016 Election apportionment diagram

2019 Election apportionment diagram

2021 Election apportionment diagram

== By-election results ==
=== 1998-2002 ===
St Margarets By-Election 18 March 1999
Party	Candidate	Votes	%	±%
Conservative		883	43.2	+2.9
Liberal Democrats		764	37.4	+1.6
Labour		397	19.4	−4.6
Majority		119	5.8	
Turnout		2,044	33.2	
Conservative hold		Swing		

Town By-Election 20 July 2000
Party	Candidate	Votes	%	±%
Labour		629	53.4	+0.1
Conservative		411	34.9	+3.6
Liberal Democrats		137	11.6	−3.8
Majority		218	18.5	
Turnout		1,177	19.1	
Labour hold		Swing		

Sprites By-Election 7 June 2001
Party	Candidate	Votes	%	±%
Labour		1,800	59.5	+10.8
Conservative		839	27.7	−13.0
Liberal Democrats		386	12.8	+2.2
Majority		961	31.8	
Turnout		3,025		
Labour hold		Swing		

=== 2006-2010 ===
Castle Hill By-Election 19 July 2007
Party	Candidate	Votes	%	±%
Conservative	Robin Vickery	1,028	60.6	+11.8
Labour	John Harris	385	22.7	+3.5
Liberal Democrats	Nigel Cheeseman	284	16.7	−6.0
Majority		643	37.9	
Turnout		1,697	28.7	
Conservative hold		Swing		

Castle Hill By-Election 24 July 2008
Party	Candidate	Votes	%	±%
Conservative	Mary Young	843	64.3	+3.3
Labour	John Harris	282	21.5	+2.9
Liberal Democrats	Nigel Cheeseman	186	14.2	−0.4
Majority		561	42.8	
Turnout		1,311	22.3	
Conservative hold		Swing		

=== 2010-2014 ===
St Margaret's By-Election 10 November 2011
Party	Candidate	Votes	%	±%
Liberal Democrats	Cathy French	942	41.8	+6.7
Conservative	Stephen Ion	871	38.7	+1.7
Labour	Glen Chisholm	439	19.5	−1.8
Majority		71	3.1	
Turnout		2,252	35.8	
Liberal Democrats gain from Conservative		Swing	2.5	

Alexandra By-Election 2 May 2013
Party	Candidate	Votes	%	±%
Labour	John Cook	772	47.0	−7.0
UKIP	Alan Cotterell	279	17.0	+17.0
Conservative	Edward Phillips	274	16.7	+0.0
Green	Tom Wilmot	193	11.7	+1.1
Liberal Democrats	Ken Toye	126	7.7	−11.0
Majority		493	30.0	
Turnout		1,644		
Labour gain from Liberal Democrats		Swing		

Whitehouse By-Election 2 May 2013
Party	Candidate	Votes	%	±%
Labour	Colin Wright	630	41.7	−19.9
UKIP	James Crossley	537	35.5	+35.5
Conservative	Paul West	238	15.7	−12.1
Green	Geoff Reynish	55	3.6	+3.6
Liberal Democrats	Moira Kleissner	52	3.4	−7.2
Majority		93	6.2	
Turnout		1,512		
Labour hold		Swing		

=== 2014-2018 ===
Stoke Park By-Election 4 May 2017
Party	Candidate	Votes	%	±%
Conservative	Bob Hall	899	49.6	+4.0
Labour	Collette Allen	659	36.3	−10.4
UKIP	Alan Cotterell	143	7.9	+7.9
Liberal Democrats	Maureen Haaker	59	3.3	−4.4
Green	Adria Pittock	53	2.9	+2.9
Majority		240	13.2	
Turnout		1,813		
Conservative hold		Swing		

=== 2018-2022 ===
Alexandra By-Election 26 September 2019
Party	Candidate	Votes	%	±%
Labour	Adam Rae	734	50.2	−3.5
Liberal Democrats	Henry Williams	287	19.6	+10.7
Conservative	Lee Reynolds	278	19.0	−0.7
Green	Tom Wilmot	164	11.2	−6.5
Majority		447	30.6	
Turnout		1,463		
Labour hold		Swing		

=== 2022-2026 ===
Priory Heath By-Election 15 December 2022
Party	Candidate	Votes	%	±%
Labour	Roxanne Downes	653	59.9	+6.3
Conservative	Gregor McNie	314	28.8	−4.1
Liberal Democrats	Trevor Powell	123	11.3	+5.9
Majority		339	31.1	
Turnout		1,090		
Labour hold		Swing		
