= 1979 Ipswich Borough Council election =

1976 election results for Ipswich Borough Council

- 3 May 1979

All 48 seats to Ipswich Borough Council 25 seats needed for a majority
	First party	Second party
Party	Labour	Conservative
Last election	21 seats, 44.9%	26 seats, 52.2%
Seats won	29	19
Seat change	▲8	▼7
Popular vote	97,975	88,579
Percentage	52.0%	47.0%
Swing	▲7.1%	▼5.2%
- Winner of each seat at the 1979 Ipswich Borough Council election.
Control before election
Conservative
Control after election
Labour

The 1979 Ipswich Borough Council election took place on 3 May 1979 to elect members of Ipswich Borough Council in Suffolk, England. This was on the same day as local elections across the United Kingdom.

This was the first election to Ipswich Borough Council under the new arrangements determined by the Local Government Boundary Commission as laid out in their Report 280. In accordance with the Local Government Act 1972, the Council had request a system of electing by thirds. Originally, the Council had argued for 18 wards with 3 councillors each, making 54 in total. However, when this was analysed in terms of the Suffolk County Council (SCC), this was more numerous than would be compatible with SCC's desired size of 75 members. Ipswich Borough Council was invited to submit a revised proposal, leading to the creation of 16 wards with 3 councillors each. This became the finalised structure of the wards for the 1979 election.

There were 16 wards returning between 3 councillors each. The Labour Party gained control of the Council.

== Summary ==
=== Election result ===
1979 Ipswich Borough Council election
Party	Candidates	Seats	Gains	Losses	Net gain/loss	Seats %	Votes %	Votes	+/−
Labour	48	29	N/A	N/A	▲8	60.4	52.0	97,975	+7.1
Conservative	48	19	N/A	N/A	▼7	39.6	47.0	88,579	–5.2
Liberal	3	0	N/A	N/A	Steady	0.0	0.9	1,721	–2.0
Independent	1	0	N/A	N/A	Steady	0.0	0.1	157	N/A

== Ward results ==
=== Bixley ===
Bixley (3 seats)
Party	Candidate	Votes	%
Conservative	A. Seabrooke*	3,370	69.2
Conservative	B. Pinner*	3,254	66.8
Conservative	J. Shorten*	3,183	65.3
Labour	F. Coates	1,270	26.1
Labour	C. James	1,204	24.7
Labour	F. Phelps	1,128	23.2
Turnout		~4,871	81.5
Registered electors		5,977	
Conservative win (new boundaries)			
Conservative win (new boundaries)			
Conservative win (new boundaries)			

=== Bridge ===
Bridge (3 seats)
Party	Candidate	Votes	%
Labour	V. Girling*	2,675	60.5
Labour	M. Sharman*	2,312	52.3
Labour	W. Moszczynski	2,158	48.8
Conservative	S. Knights	1,505	34.1
Conservative	R. Compton	1,428	32.3
Conservative	W. White	1,286	29.1
Turnout		~4,419	77.6
Registered electors		5,695	
Labour win (new boundaries)			
Labour win (new boundaries)			
Labour win (new boundaries)			

=== Broom Hill ===
Broom Hill (3 seats)
Party	Candidate	Votes	%
Conservative	S. Manthorpe*	2,441	56.5
Conservative	A. Rampling*	2,407	55.7
Conservative	R. Soloman	2,232	51.6
Labour	B. Collings	1,452	33.6
Labour	P. Savage	1,426	33.0
Labour	D. North	1,422	32.9
Turnout		~4,324	79.1
Registered electors		5,467	
Conservative win (new boundaries)			
Conservative win (new boundaries)			
Conservative win (new boundaries)			

=== Castle Hill ===
Castle Hill (3 seats)
Party	Candidate	Votes	%
Conservative	K. Clark*	2,781	55.5
Conservative	G. Scotcher*	2,732	54.5
Conservative	P. Claxton*	2,728	54.5
Labour	J. Watkins	1,856	37.0
Labour	J. Metcalfe	1,814	36.2
Labour	J. Elston	1,693	33.8
Turnout		~5,010	84.3
Registered electors		5,943	
Conservative win (new seat)			
Conservative win (new seat)			
Conservative win (new seat)			

=== Chantry ===
Chantry (3 seats)
Party	Candidate	Votes	%
Labour	D. Grimwood*	2,083	64.5
Labour	A. Smith*	2,053	63.6
Labour	J. Cann*	2,000	61.9
Conservative	N. Childs	880	27.2
Conservative	A. Eaton	821	25.4
Conservative	C. Pinner	800	24.8
Turnout		~3,230	78.6
Registered electors		4,109	
Labour win (new boundaries)			
Labour win (new boundaries)			
Labour win (new boundaries)			

=== Gainsborough ===
Gainsborough (3 seats)
Party	Candidate	Votes	%
Labour	M. Mickleburgh*	2,916	64.4
Labour	D. Edwards	2,498	55.1
Labour	J. Mowles*	2,424	53.5
Conservative	B. Moore	1,256	27.7
Conservative	W. Wright	1,249	27.6
Conservative	J. Young	937	20.7
Turnout		~4,530	80.2
Registered electors		5,649	
Labour win (new boundaries)			
Labour win (new boundaries)			
Labour win (new boundaries)			

=== Priory Heath ===
Priory Heath (3 seats)
Party	Candidate	Votes	%
Labour	B. James*	2,635	58.2
Labour	R. Elliott*	2,460	54.4
Labour	B. O'Reilly	2,339	51.7
Conservative	R. Coates	1,533	33.9
Conservative	N. Cook-Abbott	1,461	32.3
Conservative	J. Pinner	1,454	32.1
Independent	P. Watkins (Note: Stood under the abbreviation 'NDP'.)	157	3.5
Turnout		~4,524	77.5
Registered electors		5,838	
Labour win (new seat)			
Labour win (new seat)			
Labour win (new seat)			

=== Rushmere ===
Rushmere (3 seats)
Party	Candidate	Votes	%
Conservative	W. Pipe*	2,503	53.5
Conservative	O. Cook*	2,467	52.8
Conservative	R. Strutt*	2,455	52.5
Labour	I. Grimwood	2,171	46.4
Labour	C. Rawlinson	2,079	44.5
Labour	P. Mowles	2,070	44.3
Turnout		~4,676	78.7
Registered electors		5,942	
Conservative win (new boundaries)			
Conservative win (new boundaries)			
Conservative win (new boundaries)			

=== Sprites ===
Sprites (3 seats)
Party	Candidate	Votes	%
Labour	K. Cartwright*	2,900	58.7
Labour	D. Packard*	2,833	57.4
Labour	M. Fricska	2,682	54.3
Conservative	P. Borrett	1,693	34.3
Conservative	M. Hudson	1,602	32.4
Conservative	T. Seymour	1,599	32.4
Turnout		~4,939	79.4
Registered electors		6,220	
Labour win (new seat)			
Labour win (new seat)			
Labour win (new seat)			

=== St Clements ===
St Clements (3 seats)
Party	Candidate	Votes	%
Labour	J. Hill	2,282	47.4
Labour	E. Grant	2,279	47.3
Conservative	J. Cooper*	2,235	46.4
Conservative	J. Driver*	2,197	45.6
Labour	B. Messenger	2,197	45.6
Conservative	S. Sheldrake	2,105	43.7
Turnout		~4,817	81.5
Registered electors		5,910	
Labour win (new boundaries)			
Labour win (new boundaries)			
Conservative win (new boundaries)			

=== St John's ===
St John's (3 seats)
Party	Candidate	Votes	%
Conservative	F. Brown*	2,226	49.2
Conservative	W. Hammond*	2,066	45.6
Labour	P. Allan	2,027	44.8
Labour	D. Worsop	2,000	44.2
Conservative	O. Nunn*	1,908	42.1
Labour	K. Wilson	1,860	41.1
Turnout		~4,527	80.4
Registered electors		5,631	
Conservative win (new boundaries)			
Conservative win (new boundaries)			
Labour win (new boundaries)			

=== St Margaret's ===
St Margaret's (3 seats)
Party	Candidate	Votes	%
Conservative	H. Davis	2,889	59.5
Conservative	D. Marrlott*	2,779	57.2
Conservative	J. Swindin	2,631	54.2
Labour	B. Chaplin	1,484	30.6
Labour	S. Rodwell	1,461	30.1
Labour	T. Gondris	1,424	29.3
Turnout		~4,857	78.4
Registered electors		6,195	
Conservative win (new boundaries)			
Conservative win (new boundaries)			
Conservative win (new boundaries)			

=== Stoke Park ===
Stoke Park (3 seats)
Party	Candidate	Votes	%
Labour	R. Kirby	1,463	40.8
Labour	J. Dewhurst	1,443	40.3
Conservative	R. Mudd	1,381	38.6
Labour	A. White	1,368	38.2
Conservative	J. Mudd	1,299	36.3
Conservative	M. Lambert	1,182	33.0
Liberal	R. Knights	609	17.0
Liberal	W. Oliver	566	15.8
Liberal	A. Tuffin	546	15.2
Turnout		~3,582	78.7
Registered electors		4,551	
Labour win (new seat)			
Labour win (new seat)			
Conservative win (new seat)			

=== Town ===
Town (3 seats)
Party	Candidate	Votes	%
Labour	P. Ross*	2,005	53.5
Labour	F. Yule	1,900	50.7
Labour	I. Chevous	1,895	50.6
Conservative	A. Barker*	1,536	41.0
Conservative	G. Dalby	1,444	38.5
Conservative	M. Hammond	1,427	38.1
Turnout		~3,746	68.1
Registered electors		5,501	
Labour win (new seat)			
Labour win (new seat)			
Labour win (new seat)			

=== Whitehouse ===
Whitehouse (3 seats)
Party	Candidate	Votes	%
Labour	S. Mason*	2,326	54.9
Labour	H. Beales*	2,265	53.4
Labour	D. Eaton*	2,206	52.1
Conservative	D. Baldwin	1,405	33.2
Conservative	W. Bloomfield	1,322	31.2
Conservative	J. Baldwin	1,313	31.0
Turnout		~4,238	78.9
Registered electors		5,371	
Labour win (new seat)			
Labour win (new seat)			
Labour win (new seat)			

=== Whitton ===
Whitton (3 seats)
Party	Candidate	Votes	%
Labour	K. Wilcox	2,570	66.2
Labour	P. Gardiner	2,501	64.5
Labour	R. Caley	2,466	63.6
Conservative	J. Bealing	1,450	37.4
Conservative	N. Paternoster	1,407	36.3
Conservative	N. Lee-Frampton	1,320	34.0
Turnout		~3,880	69.7
Registered electors		5,567	
Labour win (new boundaries)			
Labour win (new boundaries)			
Labour win (new boundaries)			
