= 1983 Ipswich Borough Council election =

1983 English local government election

- 5 May 1983

16 out of 48 seats to Ipswich Borough Council 25 seats needed for a majority
	First party	Second party
Party	Labour	Conservative
Last election	32 seats, 44.2%	16 seats, 37.9%
Seats won	9	7
Seats after	31	17
Seat change	▼1	▲1
Popular vote	17,049	15,676
Percentage	45.3%	41.6%
Swing	▲1.1%	▲3.7%
- Winner of each seat at the 1983 Ipswich Borough Council election.
Control before election
Labour
Control after election
Labour

The 1983 Ipswich Borough Council election using the system of electing by thirds was completed as this was the third election to the Ipswich Borough Council under the arrangement, whereby a third of the councillors were to stand for election, each time. These new arrangements had been determined by the Local Government Boundary Commission as laid out in their Report 280.

It took place as part of the 1983 United Kingdom local elections.

There were 16 wards each returning one councillor. The Labour Party retained control of the council.

== Summary ==
=== Election result ===
1983 Ipswich Borough Council election
Party	This election				Full council			This election		
Party	Candidates	Seats	Net	Seats %	Other	Total	Total %	Votes	Votes %	+/−
Labour	16	9	▼1	56.3	22	31	64.6	17,049	45.3	+1.1
Conservative	16	7	▲1	43.8	10	17	35.4	15,676	41.6	+3.7
Alliance	16	0	Steady	0.0	0	0	0.0	4,726	12.6	–5.0
Independent	2	0	Steady	0.0	0	0	0.0	204	0.5	+0.3

== Ward results ==
Incumbent councillors standing for re-election are marked with an asterisk (*). Changes in seats do not take into account defections.

=== Bixley ===
Bixley
Party	Candidate	Votes	%	±%
Conservative	S. Sheldrake	1,868	71.5	+3.3
Labour	E. Urry	417	16.0	+0.5
Alliance	L. Miernik	328	12.6	−2.7
Majority		1,451	55.5	+2.8
Turnout		2,613	44.4	+3.8
Registered electors		5,886		
Conservative hold		Swing	▲1.4	

=== Bridge ===
Bridge
Party	Candidate	Votes	%	±%
Labour	P. Smart	1,291	58.9	−4.8
Conservative	S. Knights	658	30.0	+5.6
Alliance	B. Oliver	244	11.1	−0.8
Majority		633	28.9	−10.4
Turnout		2,193	40.1	+3.2
Registered electors		5,504		
Labour hold		Swing	▼5.2	

=== Broom Hill ===
Broom Hill
Party	Candidate	Votes	%	±%
Conservative	R. Driver	1,446	58.1	+2.0
Labour	J. Selway	660	26.5	+5.1
Alliance	J. Odell	381	15.3	−7.2
Majority		786	31.6	−2.0
Turnout		2,487	45.5	+4.6
Registered electors		5,462		
Conservative hold		Swing	▼1.6	

=== Castle Hill ===
Castle Hill
Party	Candidate	Votes	%	±%
Conservative	J. Cooper*	1,342	66.2	+9.0
Labour	D. Eaton	546	26.9	+3.1
Alliance	C. Betts	138	6.8	−12.2
Majority		796	33.1	−0.3
Turnout		2,026	39.9	+0.8
Registered electors		6,037		
Conservative hold		Swing	▲3.0	

=== Chantry ===
Chantry
Party	Candidate	Votes	%	±%
Labour	D. Grimwood*	1,082	71.4	+6.7
Conservative	L. Howard	295	19.5	+3.3
Alliance	C. Betts	138	9.1	−10.0
Majority		787	51.9	+6.3
Turnout		1,515	35.5	+4.7
Registered electors		4,290		
Labour hold		Swing	▲1.7	

=== Gainsborough ===
Gainsborough
Party	Candidate	Votes	%	±%
Labour	M. Alderton	1,614	74.4	+2.9
Conservative	W. Bloomfield	382	17.6	+0.7
Alliance	N. Cheeseman	173	8.0	−1.7
Majority		1,232	56.8	+2.2
Turnout		2,169	38.5	+3.8
Registered electors		5,644		
Labour hold		Swing	▲1.1	

=== Priory Heath ===
Priory Heath
Party	Candidate	Votes	%	±%
Labour	J. Tricker	1,394	58.3	+1.1
Conservative	B. Moore	705	29.5	+5.6
Alliance	A. Howlett	266	11.1	−6.7
Independent	P. Watkins	25	1.0	N/A
Majority		689	28.8	−4.6
Turnout		2,390	40.8	+1.8
Registered electors		5,688		
Labour hold		Swing	▼2.3	

=== Rushmere ===
Rushmere
Party	Candidate	Votes	%	±%
Conservative	K. Boynes	1,500	45.7	+4.5
Labour	I. Grimwood	1,288	39.2	+1.0
Alliance	B. Taylor	496	15.1	−5.5
Majority		212	6.5	+3.5
Turnout		3,284	55.4	+3.5
Registered electors		5,927		
Conservative hold		Swing	▲1.8	

=== Sprites ===
Sprites
Party	Candidate	Votes	%	±%
Labour	G. Rusher	1,126	55.2	−0.3
Conservative	G. Dalby	637	31.2	+3.6
Alliance	N. Sanderson	277	13.6	−3.3
Majority		489	24.0	−3.9
Turnout		2,040	33.0	+4.6
Registered electors		6,190		
Labour hold		Swing	▼2.0	

=== St Clements ===
St Clements
Party	Candidate	Votes	%	±%
Conservative	R. Harsant	1,303	42.9	+4.8
Labour	W. Quinton	1,171	38.5	−4.4
Alliance	K. Prior	566	18.6	−0.4
Majority		132	4.4	N/A
Turnout		3,040	51.6	+6.4
Registered electors		5,894		
Conservative gain from Labour		Swing	▲4.6	

=== St John's ===
St John's
Party	Candidate	Votes	%	±%
Conservative	K. Clark	1,315	45.8	+3.6
Labour	R. Canty	1,285	44.8	+3.4
Alliance	A. Holden	270	9.4	−7.0
Majority		30	1.0	+0.2
Turnout		2,870	49.3	+5.1
Registered electors		5,832		
Conservative hold		Swing	▲0.1	

=== St Margaret's ===
St Margaret's
Party	Candidate	Votes	%	±%
Conservative	H. Davis*	1,561	57.8	−2.4
Labour	G. Goodall	640	23.7	±0.0
Alliance	K. Pettican	500	18.5	+2.4
Majority		921	34.1	−2.4
Turnout		2,701	45.0	+4.5
Registered electors		6,023		
Conservative hold		Swing	▼1.2	

=== Stoke Park ===
Stoke Park
Party	Candidate	Votes	%	±%
Labour	M. Pickard	981	46.0	+4.0
Conservative	N. Lee-Frampton	892	41.8	+6.9
Alliance	E. Pearl	260	12.2	−10.9
Majority		89	4.2	−2.9
Turnout		2,133	35.9	+0.7
Registered electors		5,940		
Labour hold		Swing	▼1.5	

=== Town ===
Town
Party	Candidate	Votes	%	±%
Labour	S. Baguley	1,283	57.3	+4.0
Conservative	B. Castle	699	31.2	+1.9
Alliance	M. Redbond	258	11.5	−5.9
Majority		584	26.1	+2.1
Turnout		2,240	42.0	+2.8
Registered electors		5,337		
Labour hold		Swing	▲1.1	

=== Whitehouse ===
Whitehouse
Party	Candidate	Votes	%	±%
Labour	J. Dymond	1,019	51.8	−3.4
Conservative	A. Barker	502	25.5	+3.8
Alliance	J. Manley	266	13.5	−9.6
Independent	S. Mason*	179	9.1	N/A
Majority		517	26.3	−5.8
Turnout		1,966	36.0	+2.3
Registered electors		5,468		
Labour hold		Swing	▼3.6	

=== Whitton ===
Whitton
Party	Candidate	Votes	%	±%
Labour	K. Wilcox*	1,252	63.0	−1.9
Conservative	A. Carlton	571	28.7	+6.7
Alliance	F. Jackson	165	8.3	−4.8
Majority		681	34.3	−8.6
Turnout		1,988	36.5	+1.2
Registered electors		5,455		
Labour hold		Swing	▼4.3	
