= 1992 Ipswich Borough Council election =

1992 election results for Ipswich Borough Council

- 7 May 1992

16 out of 48 seats to Ipswich Borough Council 25 seats needed for a majority
	First party	Second party
Party	Labour	Conservative
Last election	37 seats, 49.8%	11 seats, 43.1%
Seats won	8	8
Seats after	33	15
Seat change	▼4	▲4
Popular vote	14,598	15,327
Percentage	46.5%	48.8%
Swing	▼3.3%	▲5.7%
- Winner of each seat at the 1992 Ipswich Borough Council election.
Control before election
Labour
Control after election
Labour

The 1992 Ipswich Borough Council election was an election to the Ipswich Borough Council under the arrangement, whereby a third of the councillors were to stand for election, each time.

It took place as part of the 1992 United Kingdom local elections.

There were 16 wards each returning one councillor. The Labour Party retained control of the Council.

== Summary ==
=== Election result ===
1992 Ipswich Borough Council election
Party	This election				Full council			This election		
Party	Candidates	Seats	Net	Seats %	Other	Total	Total %	Votes	Votes %	+/−
Labour	16	8	▼4	50.0	25	33	68.8	14,598	46.5	–3.3
Conservative	16	8	▲4	50.0	7	15	31.3	15,327	48.8	+5.7
Liberal Democrats	7	0	Steady	0.0	0	0	0.0	1,480	4.7	–0.3

== Ward results ==
Incumbent councillors standing for re-election are marked with an asterisk (*). Changes in seats do not take into account defections.

=== Bixley ===
Bixley
Party	Candidate	Votes	%	±%
Conservative	J. Shorten*	1,644	67.5	+6.2
Labour	C. Campbell	467	19.2	−0.3
Liberal Democrats	M. Pakes	324	13.3	−5.9
Majority		1,177	48.3	+6.5
Turnout		2,435	42.6	−6.6
Registered electors		5,764		
Conservative hold		Swing	▲3.3	

=== Bridge ===
Bridge
Party	Candidate	Votes	%	±%
Labour	D. Turnbull*	1,073	61.3	−2.2
Conservative	P. Murray-Cowen	677	38.7	+2.2
Majority		396	22.6	−4.4
Turnout		1,750	32.6	−2.1
Registered electors		5,432		
Labour hold		Swing	▼2.2	

=== Broom Hill ===
Broom Hill
Party	Candidate	Votes	%	±%
Conservative	H. Davies*	1,113	57.3	+9.7
Labour	R. Penn	602	31.0	−6.7
Liberal Democrats	J. Odell	226	11.6	−3.1
Majority		511	26.3	+16.4
Turnout		1,941	38.0	−9.7
Registered electors		5,151		
Conservative hold		Swing	▲8.2	

=== Castle Hill ===
Castle Hill
Party	Candidate	Votes	%	±%
Conservative	B. Jay*	1,464	65.0	+9.8
Labour	N. Long	787	35.0	+5.7
Majority		677	30.0	+4.1
Turnout		2,251	39.7	−7.4
Registered electors		5,793		
Conservative hold		Swing	▲2.1	

=== Chantry ===
Chantry
Party	Candidate	Votes	%	±%
Labour	J. McCartney	884	64.1	−5.7
Conservative	A. Barker	496	35.9	+5.7
Majority		388	28.2	−11.4
Turnout		1,380	29.6	−6.9
Registered electors		4,712		
Labour hold		Swing	▼5.7	

=== Gainsborough ===
Gainsborough
Party	Candidate	Votes	%	±%
Labour	J. Mowles*	1,088	62.7	−1.1
Conservative	G. Morris	647	37.3	+10.1
Majority		441	25.4	−11.2
Turnout		1,735	30.0	−9.8
Registered electors		5,870		
Labour hold		Swing	▼6.2	

=== Priory Heath ===
Priory Heath
Party	Candidate	Votes	%	±%
Labour	W. Quinton*	1,073	60.1	−6.0
Conservative	M. Baldry	711	39.9	+6.0
Majority		362	20.2	−12.0
Turnout		1,784	30.9	−7.8
Registered electors		5,450		
Labour hold		Swing	▼6.0	

=== Rushmere ===
Rushmere
Party	Candidate	Votes	%	±%
Conservative	W. Fraser	1,247	48.5	−0.3
Labour	G. Auton*	1,173	45.6	−5.6
Liberal Democrats	A. Munro	153	5.9	N/A
Majority		74	2.9	N/A
Turnout		2,573	41.4	−5.9
Registered electors		5,898		
Conservative gain from Labour		Swing	▲2.7	

=== Sprites ===
Sprites
Party	Candidate	Votes	%	±%
Labour	J. Cubbin*	1,079	60.2	−2.4
Conservative	R. Patient	714	39.8	+2.4
Majority		365	20.4	−4.8
Turnout		1,793	32.5	−5.5
Registered electors		5,579		
Labour hold		Swing	▼2.4	

=== St Clements ===
St Clements
Party	Candidate	Votes	%	±%
Conservative	P. Button	1,232	49.9	+1.8
Labour	A. Elliott*	1,026	41.5	−0.5
Liberal Democrats	V. Finbow	212	8.6	N/A
Majority		206	8.4	+2.3
Turnout		2,470	43.5	−8.2
Registered electors		5,730		
Conservative gain from Labour		Swing	▲1.2	

=== St John's ===
St John's
Party	Candidate	Votes	%	±%
Conservative	G. Spong	1,232	52.6	+10.3
Labour	A. Macknelly*	1,109	47.4	+1.6
Majority		123	5.2	N/A
Turnout		2,341	39.1	−4.5
Registered electors		6,076		
Conservative gain from Labour		Swing	▲4.4	

=== St Margaret's ===
St Margaret's
Party	Candidate	Votes	%	±%
Conservative	A. Thrussell*	1,337	56.8	+2.7
Labour	D. Hampson	774	32.9	±0.0
Liberal Democrats	J. Whitear	241	10.2	−2.9
Majority		563	23.9	+2.7
Turnout		2,352	38.2	−9.9
Registered electors		5,830		
Conservative hold		Swing	▲1.4	

=== Stoke Park ===
Stoke Park
Party	Candidate	Votes	%	±%
Conservative	S. Evans	1,098	52.1	+5.3
Labour	K. Wilson*	809	38.4	−14.8
Liberal Democrats	J. Logan-Smith	201	9.5	N/A
Majority		289	13.7	N/A
Turnout		2,108	36.6	−0.6
Registered electors		5,855		
Conservative gain from Labour		Swing	▲10.1	

=== Town ===
Town
Party	Candidate	Votes	%	±%
Labour	P. Breakwell	1,126	62.9	−1.2
Conservative	D. Goldsmith	664	37.1	+1.2
Majority		462	25.8	−2.4
Turnout		1,790	31.2	−3.5
Registered electors		5,789		
Labour hold		Swing	▼1.2	

=== Whitehouse ===
Whitehouse
Party	Candidate	Votes	%	±%
Labour	G. King*	787	55.2	+0.6
Conservative	S. Laine	516	36.2	+4.9
Liberal Democrats	E. Beattie	123	8.6	−5.4
Majority		271	19.0	−4.3
Turnout		1,426	26.6	−7.5
Registered electors		5,426		
Labour hold		Swing	▼2.2	

=== Whitton ===
Whitton
Party	Candidate	Votes	%	±%
Labour	J. Harris	741	58.1	−4.0
Conservative	L. Green	535	41.9	+4.0
Majority		206	16.2	−8.0
Turnout		1,276	25.3	−7.5
Registered electors		5,220		
Labour hold		Swing	▼4.0	
