= 1996 Ipswich Borough Council election =

1996 election results for Ipswich Borough Council

- 2 May 1996

18 out of 48 seats to Ipswich Borough Council 25 seats needed for a majority
| | First party | Second party | Third party |
|---|---|---|---|
| Party | Labour | Conservative | Liberal Democrats |
| Last election | 36 seats, 63.0% | 11 seats, 23.9% | 1 seat, 12.9% |
| Seats won | 16 | 2 | 0 |
| Seats after | 41 | 6 | 1 |
| Seat change | ▲5 | ▼5 | Steady |
| Popular vote | 19,076 | 7,844 | 3,615 |
| Percentage | 62.4% | 25.7% | 11.8% |
| Swing | ▼0.6% | ▲1.8% | ▼1.1% |
- Winner of each seat at the 1996 Ipswich Borough Council election.
Control before election
Labour
Control after election
Labour

The 1996 Ipswich Borough Council election was an election to the Ipswich Borough Council under the arrangement, whereby a third of the councillors were to stand for election, each time.

It took place as part of the 1996 United Kingdom local elections.

There were 16 wards each returning one councillor plus three bye-elections, one each for Chantry, Stoke Park and Town Wards. The Labour Party retained control of the Council.

== Summary ==
=== Election result ===
1996 Ipswich Borough Council election
| Party | This election | | | | Full council | | | This election | | |
| Party | Candidates | Seats | Net | Seats % | Other | Total | Total % | Votes | Votes % | +/− |
|---|---|---|---|---|---|---|---|---|---|---|
| Labour | 18 | 16 | ▲5 | 88.9 | 25 | 41 | 85.4 | 19,076 | 62.4 | –0.6 |
| Conservative | 18 | 2 | ▼5 | 11.1 | 4 | 6 | 12.5 | 7,844 | 25.7 | +1.8 |
| Liberal Democrats | 16 | 0 | Steady | 0.0 | 1 | 1 | 2.1 | 3,615 | 11.8 | –1.1 |
| Independent | 1 | 0 | Steady | 0.0 | 0 | 0 | 0.0 | 30 | 0.1 | N/A |

== Ward results ==
Incumbent councillors standing for re-election are marked with an asterisk (*). Changes in seats do not take into account defections.

=== Bixley ===
Bixley
| Party | Candidate | Votes | % | ±% |
|---|---|---|---|---|
| Conservative | J. Shorten* | 1,040 | 50.5 | +6.9 |
| Labour | A. Martin | 758 | 36.8 | +4.3 |
| Liberal Democrats | P. Richardson | 261 | 12.7 | −11.1 |
| Majority | | 282 | 13.7 | +2.6 |
| Turnout | | 2,059 | 35.4 | −2.6 |
| Registered electors | | 5,835 | | |
| Conservative hold | | Swing | ▲1.3 | |

=== Bridge ===
Bridge
| Party | Candidate | Votes | % | ±% |
|---|---|---|---|---|
| Labour | D. Turnbull* | 1,005 | 70.6 | −4.0 |
| Conservative | G. Morris | 245 | 17.2 | +0.9 |
| Liberal Democrats | D. Mullett | 174 | 12.2 | +3.1 |
| Majority | | 760 | 53.4 | −4.9 |
| Turnout | | 1,424 | 25.3 | −3.1 |
| Registered electors | | 5,640 | | |
| Labour hold | | Swing | ▼2.5 | |

=== Broom Hill ===
Broom Hill
| Party | Candidate | Votes | % | ±% |
|---|---|---|---|---|
| Labour | A. Carruthers | 807 | 45.5 | −5.1 |
| Conservative | H. Davis* | 692 | 39.0 | +4.2 |
| Liberal Democrats | N. Cheeseman | 276 | 15.5 | +0.9 |
| Majority | | 115 | 6.5 | −9.3 |
| Turnout | | 1,775 | 35.1 | −0.2 |
| Registered electors | | 5,053 | | |
| Labour gain from Conservative | | Swing | ▼4.7 | |

=== Castle Hill ===
Castle Hill
| Party | Candidate | Votes | % | ±% |
|---|---|---|---|---|
| Labour | N. Fawkes | 1,154 | 52.3 | −5.6 |
| Conservative | J. Cooper | 850 | 38.5 | +4.6 |
| Liberal Democrats | D. Day | 204 | 9.2 | +0.9 |
| Majority | | 304 | 13.8 | −10.2 |
| Turnout | | 2,208 | 38.3 | −5.0 |
| Registered electors | | 5,769 | | |
| Labour gain from Conservative | | Swing | ▼5.1 | |

=== Chantry ===
Chantry
| Party | Candidate | Votes | % | ±% |
|---|---|---|---|---|
| Labour | J. McCartney* | 960 | 78.6 | −0.2 |
| Labour | T. Watson | 840 | 68.8 | −10.0 |
| Conservative | K. Matthews | 153 | 12.5 | −0.4 |
| Conservative | D. Webb | 123 | 10.1 | −2.8 |
| Liberal Democrats | D. Perkins | 99 | 8.1 | −0.2 |
| Turnout | | ~1,221 | 27.1 | −3.5 |
| Registered electors | | 4,505 | | |
| Labour hold | | | | |
| Labour hold | | | | |

=== Gainsborough ===
Gainsborough
| Party | Candidate | Votes | % | ±% |
|---|---|---|---|---|
| Labour | J. Mowles* | 1,188 | 68.9 | −8.3 |
| Conservative | D. Ward | 281 | 16.3 | +2.7 |
| Liberal Democrats | N. Roberts | 255 | 14.8 | +5.6 |
| Majority | | 907 | 52.6 | −11.0 |
| Turnout | | 1,724 | 29.8 | −3.4 |
| Registered electors | | 5,799 | | |
| Labour hold | | Swing | ▼5.5 | |

=== Priory Heath ===
Priory Heath
| Party | Candidate | Votes | % | ±% |
|---|---|---|---|---|
| Labour | W. Quinton* | 1,087 | 70.7 | −1.6 |
| Conservative | M. Baldry | 297 | 19.3 | +2.6 |
| Liberal Democrats | N. Moloney | 153 | 10.0 | −1.0 |
| Majority | | 790 | 51.4 | −4.2 |
| Turnout | | 1,537 | 29.0 | −3.6 |
| Registered electors | | 5,308 | | |
| Labour hold | | Swing | ▼2.1 | |

=== Rushmere ===
Rushmere
| Party | Candidate | Votes | % | ±% |
|---|---|---|---|---|
| Labour | R. Risebrow | 1,502 | 63.6 | +1.6 |
| Conservative | S. Ion | 595 | 25.2 | +1.7 |
| Liberal Democrats | G. Auton | 263 | 11.1 | −3.4 |
| Majority | | 907 | 38.4 | −0.1 |
| Turnout | | 2,360 | 39.0 | −2.0 |
| Registered electors | | 6,019 | | |
| Labour gain from Conservative | | Swing | ▼0.1 | |

=== Sprites ===
Sprites
| Party | Candidate | Votes | % | ±% |
|---|---|---|---|---|
| Labour | J. Cubbin* | 1,222 | 78.3 | +2.5 |
| Conservative | J. Langley | 199 | 12.8 | −1.7 |
| Liberal Democrats | J. Eddy | 139 | 8.9 | −0.9 |
| Majority | | 1,023 | 65.5 | +4.2 |
| Turnout | | 1,560 | 29.1 | −4.8 |
| Registered electors | | 5,359 | | |
| Labour hold | | Swing | ▲2.1 | |

=== St Clements ===
St Clements
| Party | Candidate | Votes | % | ±% |
|---|---|---|---|---|
| Labour | C. Tournay-Godfrey | 1,232 | 62.0 | −1.1 |
| Conservative | T. Kenna-Bates | 504 | 25.4 | +1.3 |
| Liberal Democrats | R. Whitmore | 250 | 12.6 | −0.3 |
| Majority | | 728 | 36.6 | −2.4 |
| Turnout | | 1,986 | 34.3 | −2.8 |
| Registered electors | | 5,800 | | |
| Labour gain from Conservative | | Swing | ▼1.2 | |

=== St John's ===
St John's
| Party | Candidate | Votes | % | ±% |
|---|---|---|---|---|
| Labour | M. Pluke | 1,235 | 62.8 | −8.2 |
| Conservative | M. Staggs | 401 | 20.4 | −8.6 |
| Liberal Democrats | J. Cowan | 329 | 16.7 | N/A |
| Majority | | 834 | 42.4 | +0.4 |
| Turnout | | 1,965 | 31.0 | −2.9 |
| Registered electors | | 6,083 | | |
| Labour gain from Conservative | | Swing | ▲0.2 | |

=== St Margaret's ===
St Margaret's
| Party | Candidate | Votes | % | ±% |
|---|---|---|---|---|
| Conservative | C. Fisher | 1,092 | 39.2 | +3.2 |
| Labour | E. Cooper | 1,076 | 38.6 | +6.0 |
| Liberal Democrats | R. Atkins | 618 | 22.2 | −9.2 |
| Majority | | 16 | 0.6 | −2.8 |
| Turnout | | 2,786 | 46.9 | +2.9 |
| Registered electors | | 5,944 | | |
| Conservative hold | | Swing | ▼1.4 | |

=== Stoke Park ===
Stoke Park
| Party | Candidate | Votes | % | ±% |
|---|---|---|---|---|
| Labour | M. Carrington-Brown | 969 | 64.9 | −2.2 |
| Conservative | G. Terry | 377 | 25.2 | +5.5 |
| Liberal Democrats | K. Wroe | 148 | 9.9 | −3.3 |
| Majority | | 592 | 39.7 | −7.7 |
| Turnout | | 1,494 | 26.4 | −1.9 |
| Registered electors | | 5,699 | | |
| Labour hold | | Swing | ▼3.9 | |

=== Town ===
Town (2 seats due to by-election)
| Party | Candidate | Votes | % | ±% |
|---|---|---|---|---|
| Labour | P. Breakwell* | 1,106 | 67.5 | −4.0 |
| Labour | D. Hosking | 1,011 | 61.7 | −9.8 |
| Conservative | R. Harris | 323 | 19.7 | +5.3 |
| Conservative | M. Young | 278 | 17.0 | +2.6 |
| Liberal Democrats | A. Houseley | 207 | 12.6 | +1.9 |
| Independent | S. Navalkar | 30 | 1.8 | N/A |
| Turnout | | ~1,639 | 27.4 | −4.1 |
| Registered electors | | 5,983 | | |
| Labour hold | | | | |
| Labour hold | | | | |

=== Whitehouse ===
Whitehouse
| Party | Candidate | Votes | % | ±% |
|---|---|---|---|---|
| Labour | G. King* | 973 | 75.6 | −1.5 |
| Conservative | D. Read | 196 | 15.2 | +2.0 |
| Liberal Democrats | N. Day | 118 | 9.2 | −0.5 |
| Majority | | 777 | 60.4 | −3.5 |
| Turnout | | 1,287 | 23.9 | −3.2 |
| Registered electors | | 5,378 | | |
| Labour hold | | Swing | ▼1.8 | |

=== Whitton ===
Whitton
| Party | Candidate | Votes | % | ±% |
|---|---|---|---|---|
| Labour | J. Harris* | 951 | 74.9 | −0.1 |
| Conservative | S. Lark | 198 | 15.6 | +0.6 |
| Liberal Democrats | B. Fearnley | 121 | 9.5 | −0.5 |
| Majority | | 753 | 59.3 | −0.7 |
| Turnout | | 1,270 | 25.6 | −2.6 |
| Registered electors | | 4,968 | | |
| Labour hold | | Swing | ▼0.4 | |
