= 1980 Ipswich Borough Council election =

1980 election results for Ipswich Borough Council

- 1 May 1980

16 out of 48 seats to Ipswich Borough Council 25 seats needed for a majority
	First party	Second party
Party	Labour	Conservative
Last election	29 seats, 52.0%	19 seats, 47.0%
Seats won	12	4
Seats after	32	16
Seat change	▲3	▼3
Popular vote	18,930	13,602
Percentage	57.1%	41.0%
Swing	▲5.1%	▼6.0%
- Winner of each seat at the 1980 Ipswich Borough Council election.
Control before election
Labour
Control after election
Labour

The 1980 Ipswich Borough Council election was the first election to the Ipswich Borough Council under the system of electing by thirds, whereby a third of the councillors were to stand for election, each time. These new arrangements had been determined by the Local Government Boundary Commission as laid out in their Report 280.

It took place as part of the 1980 United Kingdom local elections.

There were 16 wards each returning one councillor. The Labour Party retained control of the Council.

== Summary ==
=== Election result ===
1980 Ipswich Borough Council election
Party	This election				Full council			This election		
Party	Candidates	Seats	Net	Seats %	Other	Total	Total %	Votes	Votes %	+/−
Labour	16	12	▲3	75.0	20	32	66.7	18,930	57.1	+5.1
Conservative	16	4	▼3	25.0	12	16	33.3	13,602	41.0	–6.0
Liberal	3	0	Steady	0.0	0	0	0.0	615	1.9	+1.0

== Ward results ==
Incumbent councillors standing for re-election are marked with an asterisk (*). Changes in seats do not take into account defections.

=== Bixley ===
Bixley
Party	Candidate	Votes	%	±%
Conservative	J. Shorton*	1,550	77.4	+4.8
Labour	C. James	453	22.6	−4.8
Majority		1,097	54.8	N/A
Turnout		2,003	33.9	–47.6
Registered electors		5,915		
Conservative hold		Swing	▲4.8	

=== Bridge ===
Bridge
Party	Candidate	Votes	%	±%
Labour	W. Moszczynski*	1,542	75.5	+11.5
Conservative	E. Lee	500	24.5	−11.5
Majority		1,042	51.0	N/A
Turnout		2,042	65.2	−12.4
Registered electors		3,133		
Labour hold		Swing	▲11.5	

=== Broom Hill ===
Broom Hill
Party	Candidate	Votes	%	±%
Conservative	R. Soloman*	1,225	59.0	−3.7
Labour	D. North	636	30.7	−6.6
Liberal	R. Knights	214	10.3	N/A
Majority		589	28.3	N/A
Turnout		2,075	38.5	−40.6
Registered electors		5,383		
Conservative hold		Swing	▲1.5	

=== Castle Hill ===
Castle Hill
Party	Candidate	Votes	%	±%
Conservative	P. Claxton*	1,280	59.6	−0.4
Labour	J. Metcalfe	866	40.4	+0.4
Majority		414	19.2	N/A
Turnout		2,146	36.3	−48.0
Registered electors		5,910		
Conservative hold		Swing	▼0.4	

=== Chantry ===
Chantry
Party	Candidate	Votes	%	±%
Labour	J. Cann*	1,109	80.8	+10.5
Conservative	N. Childs	263	19.2	−10.5
Majority		846	61.6	N/A
Turnout		1,372	34.1	−44.5
Registered electors		4,027		
Labour hold		Swing	▲10.5	

=== Gainsborough ===
Gainsborough
Party	Candidate	Votes	%	±%
Labour	J. Mowles*	1,667	79.8	+9.9
Conservative	B. Moore	421	20.2	−9.9
Majority		1,246	59.6	N/A
Turnout		2,088	37.2	−43.0
Registered electors		5,611		
Labour hold		Swing	▲9.9	

=== Priory Heath ===
Priory Heath
Party	Candidate	Votes	%	±%
Labour	D. Warsop	1,330	69.6	+8.7
Conservative	G. Dolby	580	30.4	−5.0
Majority		740	39.2	N/A
Turnout		1,910	33.2	−44.3
Registered electors		5,748		
Labour hold		Swing	▲6.9	

=== Rushmere ===
Rushmere
Party	Candidate	Votes	%	±%
Labour	G. Auton	1,539	50.5	+4.1
Conservative	R. Coates	1,510	49.5	−4.1
Majority		29	1.0	N/A
Turnout		3,049	51.4	−27.3
Registered electors		5,929		
Labour gain from Conservative		Swing	▲4.1	

=== Sprites ===
Sprites
Party	Candidate	Votes	%	±%
Labour	M. Friscka*	1,411	74.9	+11.8
Conservative	M. Hudson	472	25.1	−11.8
Majority		939	49.8	N/A
Turnout		1,883	30.5	−48.9
Registered electors		6,182		
Labour hold		Swing	▲11.8	

=== St Clements ===
St Clements
Party	Candidate	Votes	%	±%
Labour	B. Messenger	1,404	55.5	+5.0
Conservative	J. Cooper*	1,128	44.5	−5.0
Majority		276	11.0	N/A
Turnout		2,532	43.3	−38.2
Registered electors		5,848		
Labour gain from Conservative		Swing	▲5.0	

=== St John's ===
St John's
Party	Candidate	Votes	%	±%
Labour	P. Allan*	1,447	58.1	+10.4
Conservative	T. Seymour	1,045	41.9	−10.4
Majority		402	16.2	N/A
Turnout		2,492	43.7	−36.7
Registered electors		5,709		
Labour hold		Swing	▲10.4	

=== St Margaret's ===
St Margaret's
Party	Candidate	Votes	%	±%
Conservative	J. Swindin*	1,585	67.9	+1.8
Labour	T. Gondris	749	32.1	−1.8
Majority		836	35.8	N/A
Turnout		2,334	38.2	−40.2
Registered electors		6,113		
Conservative hold		Swing	▲1.8	

=== Stoke Park ===
Stoke Park
Party	Candidate	Votes	%	±%
Labour	K. Wilson	938	54.6	+12.2
Conservative	S. Knights	536	31.2	−8.8
Liberal	A. Tuffin	244	14.2	−3.4
Majority		402	23.4	N/A
Turnout		1,718	35.8	−42.9
Registered electors		4,802		
Labour gain from Conservative		Swing	▲10.5	

=== Town ===
Town
Party	Candidate	Votes	%	±%
Labour	I. Cheevous*	1,235	65.5	+8.9
Conservative	P. Paternoster	650	34.5	−8.9
Majority		585	31.0	N/A
Turnout		1,885	35.5	−32.6
Registered electors		5,303		
Labour hold		Swing	▲8.9	

=== Whitehouse ===
Whitehouse
Party	Candidate	Votes	%	±%
Labour	G. King	1,165	66.8	+4.5
Conservative	J. Baldwin	423	24.2	−13.5
Liberal	W. Oliver	157	9.0	N/A
Majority		742	42.6	N/A
Turnout		1,745	32.8	−46.1
Registered electors		5,320		
Labour hold		Swing	▲9.0	

=== Whitton ===
Whitton
Party	Candidate	Votes	%	±%
Labour	R. Caley*	1,439	76.8	+12.9
Conservative	G. Pulford	434	23.2	−12.9
Majority		1,005	53.6	N/A
Turnout		1,873	34.2	−35.5
Registered electors		5,479		
Labour hold		Swing	▲12.9	
