= 1994 Ipswich Borough Council election =

1992 election results for Ipswich Borough Council

- 5 May 1994

18 out of 48 seats to Ipswich Borough Council 25 seats needed for a majority
	First party	Second party	Third party
Party	Labour	Conservative	Liberal Democrats
Last election	33 seats, 46.5%	15 seats, 48.8%	0 seats, 4.7%
Seats won	15	2	1
Seats after	33	14	1
Seat change	Steady	▼1	▲1
Popular vote	19,892	10,725	7,376
Percentage	51.6%	27.8%	19.1%
Swing	▲5.1%	▼21.0%	▲14.4%
- Winner of each seat at the 1994 Ipswich Borough Council election.
Control before election
Labour
Control after election
Labour

The 1994 Ipswich Borough Council election was an election to the Ipswich Borough Council under the arrangement, whereby a third of the councillors were to stand for election, each time.

It took place as part of the 1994 United Kingdom local elections.

There were 16 wards each returning one councillor plus two bye-elections, one each for St John's and Stoke Park Wards. The Labour Party retained control of the Council.

== Summary ==
=== Election result ===
1994 Ipswich Borough Council election
Party	This election				Full council			This election		
Party	Candidates	Seats	Net	Seats %	Other	Total	Total %	Votes	Votes %	+/−
Labour	18	15	Steady	83.3	18	33	68.8	19,892	51.6	+5.1
Conservative	18	2	▼1	11.1	12	14	29.2	10,725	27.8	–21.0
Liberal Democrats	18	1	▲1	5.6	0	1	2.1	7,376	19.1	+14.4
Independent	1	0	Steady	0.0	0	0	0.0	277	0.7	N/A
Green	3	0	Steady	0.0	0	0	0.0	265	0.7	N/A

== Ward results ==
Incumbent councillors standing for re-election are marked with an asterisk (*). Changes in seats do not take into account defections.

=== Bixley ===
Bixley
Party	Candidate	Votes	%	±%
Conservative	G. Pulford*	1,220	48.2	−19.3
Liberal Democrats	K. Kirkwood	671	26.5	+13.2
Labour	B. Maguire	639	25.3	+6.1
Majority		549	21.7	−26.6
Turnout		2,530	44.6	+2.0
Registered electors		5,676		
Conservative hold		Swing	▼16.3	

=== Bridge ===
Bridge
Party	Candidate	Votes	%	±%
Labour	J. Powell*	1,241	66.5	+5.2
Conservative	S. Barker	346	18.5	−20.2
Liberal Democrats	V. Hendry	204	10.9	N/A
Green	J. Scott	76	4.1	N/A
Majority		895	48.0	+25.4
Turnout		1,867	34.0	+1.4
Registered electors		5,485		
Labour hold		Swing	▲12.7	

=== Broom Hill ===
Broom Hill
Party	Candidate	Votes	%	±%
Conservative	J. Le Mare	820	39.5	−17.8
Labour	L. Hardcastle*	757	36.4	+5.4
Liberal Democrats	N. Cheeseman	500	24.1	+12.5
Majority		63	3.1	−23.2
Turnout		2,077	41.0	+3.0
Registered electors		5,083		
Conservative gain from Labour		Swing	▼11.6	

=== Castle Hill ===
Castle Hill
Party	Candidate	Votes	%	±%
Labour	D. Jabbar*	1,015	40.4	+5.4
Conservative	D. Jackson	968	38.6	−26.4
Liberal Democrats	D. Day	527	21.0	N/A
Majority		47	1.8	N/A
Turnout		2,510	43.0	+3.3
Registered electors		5,792		
Labour hold		Swing	▲15.9	

=== Chantry ===
Chantry
Party	Candidate	Votes	%	±%
Labour	A. Smith*	1,113	71.7	+7.6
Conservative	M. Baldry	246	15.8	−20.1
Liberal Democrats	P. Richardson	194	12.5	N/A
Majority		867	55.9	+27.7
Turnout		1,553	34.0	+4.4
Registered electors		4,593		
Labour hold		Swing	▲13.9	

=== Gainsborough ===
Gainsborough
Party	Candidate	Votes	%	±%
Labour	D. Edwards*	1,306	57.8	−4.9
Liberal Democrats	R. Whitmore	537	23.8	N/A
Conservative	D. Ward	416	18.4	−18.9
Majority		769	34.0	+8.6
Turnout		2,259	38.9	+8.9
Registered electors		5,833		
Labour hold				

=== Priory Heath ===
Priory Heath
Party	Candidate	Votes	%	±%
Labour	D. Warsop*	1,225	62.0	+1.9
Conservative	S. Lark	384	19.4	−20.5
Liberal Democrats	J. Eddy	366	18.5	N/A
Majority		841	42.6	+22.4
Turnout		1,975	34.6	+3.7
Registered electors		5,401		
Labour hold		Swing	▲11.2	

=== Rushmere ===
Rushmere
Party	Candidate	Votes	%	±%
Labour	J. Le Grys	1,469	55.2	+9.6
Conservative	T. Wright	791	29.7	−18.8
Liberal Democrats	N. Godger	400	15.0	+9.1
Majority		678	25.5	N/A
Turnout		2,660	44.8	+3.4
Registered electors		5,972		
Labour hold		Swing	▲14.2	

=== Sprites ===
Sprites
Party	Candidate	Votes	%	±%
Labour	I. Grimwood*	1,374	68.6	+8.4
Conservative	J. Williams	347	17.3	−22.5
Liberal Democrats	N. Moloney	282	14.1	N/A
Majority		1,027	51.3	+30.9
Turnout		2,003	36.9	+4.4
Registered electors		5,428		
Labour hold		Swing	▲15.5	

=== St Clements ===
St Clements
Party	Candidate	Votes	%	±%
Labour	E. Grant*	1,316	51.5	+10.0
Conservative	J. Morgan	650	25.4	−24.5
Liberal Democrats	V. Finbow	471	18.4	+9.8
Green	C. Scott	120	4.7	N/A
Majority		666	26.1	N/A
Turnout		2,557	45.1	+1.6
Registered electors		5,670		
Labour hold		Swing	▲17.3	

=== St John's ===
St John's (2 seats due to by-election)
Party	Candidate	Votes	%	±%
Labour	D. Ball*	1,246	53.3	+5.9
Labour	A. Macknelly	1,200	51.4	+4.0
Conservative	R. Harris	717	30.7	−21.9
Conservative	E. Spong	711	30.4	−22.2
Liberal Democrats	N. Day	407	17.4	N/A
Liberal Democrats	A. Marks	356	15.2	N/A
Turnout		~2,336	39.2	+0.1
Registered electors		5,958		
Labour hold				
Labour hold				

=== St Margaret's ===
St Margaret's
Party	Candidate	Votes	%	±%
Liberal Democrats	M. Pakes	1,141	38.2	+28.0
Conservative	M. Hammond*	1,044	35.0	−21.8
Labour	D. Ellesmere	732	24.5	−8.4
Green	A. Slade	69	2.3	N/A
Majority		97	3.2	N/A
Turnout		2,986	50.0	+11.8
Registered electors		5,970		
Liberal Democrats gain from Conservative		Swing	▲24.9	

=== Stoke Park ===
Stoke Park (2 seats due to by-election)
Party	Candidate	Votes	%	±%
Labour	C. West*	964	47.8	+9.4
Labour	Y. Marsen	927	46.0	+7.6
Conservative	P. Atherton	574	28.5	−23.6
Conservative	P. West	565	28.0	−24.1
Liberal Democrats	J. Logan-Smith	282	14.0	+4.5
Liberal Democrats	E. Beattie	238	11.8	+2.3
Turnout		~2,016	35.7	−0.9
Registered electors		5,648		
Labour hold				
Labour gain from Conservative				

=== Town ===
Town
Party	Candidate	Votes	%	±%
Labour	M. Harvey*	1,255	63.0	+0.1
Conservative	D. Goldsmith	370	18.6	−18.5
Liberal Democrats	A. Houseley	367	18.4	N/A
Majority		885	44.4	+18.6
Turnout		1,992	33.5	+2.3
Registered electors		5,937		
Labour hold		Swing	▲9.3	

=== Whitehouse ===
Whitehouse
Party	Candidate	Votes	%	±%
Labour	A. Grant*	1,007	57.3	+2.1
Independent	C. Richardson	277	15.8	N/A
Conservative	D. Read	273	15.5	−20.7
Liberal Democrats	N. Ramsden	200	11.4	+2.8
Majority		730	41.5	+22.5
Turnout		1,757	32.5	+5.9
Registered electors		5,411		
Labour hold				

=== Whitton ===
Whitton
Party	Candidate	Votes	%	±%
Labour	P. Gardiner*	1,106	68.2	+10.1
Conservative	S. Fuller	283	17.4	−24.5
Liberal Democrats	B. Fearnley	233	14.4	N/A
Majority		823	50.8	+34.6
Turnout		1,622	32.3	+7.0
Registered electors		5,033		
Labour hold		Swing	▲17.3	
