= 1984 Ipswich Borough Council election =

1984 election results for Ipswich Borough Council

- 5 May 1984

17 out of 48 seats to Ipswich Borough Council 25 seats needed for a majority
	First party	Second party
Party	Labour	Conservative
Last election	31 seats, 45.3%	17 seats, 41.6%
Seats won	12	5
Seats after	30	18
Seat change	▼1	▲1
Popular vote	17,881	13,396
Percentage	50.6%	37.9%
Swing	▲5.3%	▼3.7%
- Winner of each seat at the 1984 Ipswich Borough Council election.
Control before election
Labour
Control after election
Labour

The 1984 Ipswich Borough Council election was an election to the Ipswich Borough Council under the arrangement, whereby a third of the councillors were to stand for election, each time.

It took place as part of the 1984 United Kingdom local elections.

There were 16 wards each returning one councillor plus one bye-election for Priory Heath Ward. The Labour Party retained control of the council.

== Summary ==
=== Election result ===
1984 Ipswich Borough Council election
Party	This election				Full council			This election		
Party	Candidates	Seats	Net	Seats %	Other	Total	Total %	Votes	Votes %	+/−
Labour	17	12	▼1	70.6	18	30	62.5	17,881	50.6	+5.3
Conservative	17	5	▲1	29.4	13	18	37.5	13,396	37.9	–3.7
Alliance	16	0	Steady	0.0	0	0	0.0	4,069	11.5	–1.1
Ecology	1	0	Steady	0.0	0	0	0.0	16	<0.1	N/A

== Ward results ==
Incumbent councillors standing for re-election are marked with an asterisk (*). Changes in seats do not take into account defections.

=== Bixley ===
Bixley
Party	Candidate	Votes	%	±%
Conservative	J. Shorten*	1,397	66.9	−4.6
Labour	E. Urry	394	18.9	+2.9
Alliance	A. Howlett	297	14.2	+1.6
Majority		1,003	48.0	−7.5
Turnout		2,088	35.4	−9.0
Registered electors		5,898		
Conservative hold		Swing	▼3.8	

=== Bridge ===
Bridge
Party	Candidate	Votes	%	±%
Labour	D. Turnbull	1,265	66.4	+7.5
Conservative	S. Knight	458	24.0	−6.0
Alliance	E. Pearl	182	9.6	−1.5
Majority		807	42.4	+13.5
Turnout		1,905	34.8	−4.3
Registered electors		5,474		
Labour hold		Swing	▲6.8	

=== Broom Hill ===
Broom Hill
Party	Candidate	Votes	%	±%
Conservative	C. Carlton	1,171	58.8	+0.7
Labour	J. Selway	538	27.0	+0.5
Alliance	D. Eaton	281	14.1	−1.2
Majority		633	31.8	+0.2
Turnout		1,990	36.8	−8.7
Registered electors		5,408		
Conservative hold		Swing	▲0.1	

=== Castle Hill ===
Castle Hill
Party	Candidate	Votes	%	±%
Conservative	P. Claxton*	1,133	52.8	−13.4
Labour	I. Grimwood	662	30.9	+4.0
Alliance	R. Howell	350	16.3	+9.5
Majority		471	21.9	−11.2
Turnout		2,145	35.7	−4.2
Registered electors		6,008		
Conservative hold		Swing	▼8.7	

=== Chantry ===
Chantry
Party	Candidate	Votes	%	±%
Labour	J. Cann*	960	74.2	+2.8
Conservative	L. Howard	248	19.2	−0.3
Alliance	C. Betts	86	6.6	−2.5
Majority		712	55.0	+3.1
Turnout		1,294	29.3	−6.2
Registered electors		4,416		
Labour hold		Swing	▲1.6	

=== Gainsborough ===
Gainsborough
Party	Candidate	Votes	%	±%
Labour	J. Mowles*	1,488	78.8	+4.4
Conservative	M. Allen	300	15.9	−1.7
Alliance	N. Cheeseman	100	5.3	−2.7
Majority		1,188	62.9	+6.1
Turnout		1,888	33.5	−5.0
Registered electors		5,636		
Labour hold		Swing	▲3.1	

=== Priory Heath ===
Priory Heath (2 seats due to by-election)
Party	Candidate	Votes	%	±%
Labour	W. Quinton	1,249	65.2	+6.9
Labour	D. Warsop*	1,195	62.4	+4.1
Conservative	P. Bartlett	527	27.5	−2.0
Conservative	F. Brown	469	24.5	−5.0
Alliance	A. Holden	139	7.3	−3.8
Turnout		~1,915	34.9	−5.9
Registered electors		5,487		
Labour hold				
Labour hold				

=== Rushmere ===
Rushmere
Party	Candidate	Votes	%	±%
Labour	G. Auton*	1,460	46.5	+7.3
Conservative	J. William	1,228	39.1	−6.6
Alliance	B. Taylor	454	14.4	−0.7
Majority		232	7.4	N/A
Turnout		3,142	52.4	−3.0
Registered electors		5,996		
Labour hold		Swing	▲7.0	

=== Sprites ===
Sprites
Party	Candidate	Votes	%	±%
Labour	M. Fricska*	1,102	57.9	+2.7
Conservative	D. Morris	584	30.7	−0.5
Alliance	M. Smith	201	10.6	−3.0
Ecology	P. Watkins	16	0.8	N/A
Majority		518	27.2	+3.2
Turnout		1,903	30.9	−2.1
Registered electors		6,159		
Labour hold		Swing	▲1.6	

=== St Clements ===
St Clements
Party	Candidate	Votes	%	±%
Conservative	R. Baldry	1,227	41.8	−1.1
Labour	B. Messenger*	1,223	41.6	+3.1
Alliance	K. Prior	487	16.6	−2.0
Majority		4	0.2	−4.2
Turnout		2,937	50.2	−1.4
Registered electors		5,851		
Conservative gain from Labour		Swing	▼2.1	

=== St John's ===
St John's
Party	Candidate	Votes	%	±%
Labour	R. Canty	1,352	49.2	+4.4
Conservative	G. Morris	1,142	41.5	−4.3
Alliance	N. Sanderson	256	9.3	−0.1
Majority		210	7.7	N/A
Turnout		2,750	46.5	−2.8
Registered electors		5,914		
Labour hold		Swing	▲4.4	

=== St Margaret's ===
St Margaret's
Party	Candidate	Votes	%	±%
Conservative	J. Swindin*	1,367	55.5	−2.4
Labour	I. Chevous	777	31.5	+7.8
Alliance	J. Groves	321	13.0	−5.5
Majority		590	24.0	−10.1
Turnout		2,465	40.5	−4.5
Registered electors		6,086		
Conservative hold		Swing	▼5.1	

=== Stoke Park ===
Stoke Park
Party	Candidate	Votes	%	±%
Labour	K. Wilson*	934	44.9	−1.1
Conservative	M. Doyle	749	36.0	−5.8
Alliance	K. Pettican	396	19.0	+6.8
Majority		185	8.9	+4.7
Turnout		2,079	35.0	−0.9
Registered electors		5,940		
Labour hold		Swing	▲2.4	

=== Town ===
Town
Party	Candidate	Votes	%	±%
Labour	A. Nicholls	1,240	62.2	+4.9
Conservative	B. Castle	552	27.7	−3.5
Alliance	J. Marley	200	10.0	−1.5
Majority		688	34.5	+8.4
Turnout		1,992	37.1	−4.9
Registered electors		4,830		
Labour hold		Swing	▲4.2	

=== Whitehouse ===
Whitehouse
Party	Candidate	Votes	%	±%
Labour	G. King*	992	61.4	+9.6
Conservative	B. Ferguson	469	29.0	+3.5
Alliance	M. Redband	155	9.6	−3.9
Majority		523	32.4	+6.1
Turnout		1,616	29.4	−6.6
Registered electors		5,497		
Labour hold		Swing	▲3.1	

=== Whitton ===
Whitton
Party	Candidate	Votes	%	±%
Labour	R. Caley*	1,050	66.1	+3.1
Conservative	B. Moore	375	23.6	−5.1
Alliance	T. Davis	164	10.3	+2.0
Majority		675	42.5	+8.2
Turnout		1,589	28.9	−7.6
Registered electors		5,498		
Labour hold		Swing	▲4.1	
