= 1990 Ipswich Borough Council election =

1990 English local government election

- 3 May 1990

18 out of 48 seats to Ipswich Borough Council 25 seats needed for a majority
	First party	Second party
Party	Labour	Conservative
Last election	34 seats, 59.3%	14 seats, 34.4%
Seats won	16	2
Seats after	36	12
Seat change	▲2	▼2
Popular vote	28,677	14,026
Percentage	60.4%	29.5%
Swing	▲1.1%	▼4.9%
- Winner of each seat at the 1990 Ipswich Borough Council election.
Control before election
Labour
Control after election
Labour

The 1990 Ipswich Borough Council election was an election to the Ipswich Borough Council under the arrangement, whereby a third of the councillors were to stand for election, each time.

It took place as part of the 1990 United Kingdom local elections.

There were 16 wards each returning one councillor plus two bye-elections one each for Whitehouse and Whitton Wards. The Labour Party retained control of the council.

== Summary ==
=== Election result ===
1990 Ipswich Borough Council election
Party	This election				Full council			This election		
Party	Candidates	Seats	Net	Seats %	Other	Total	Total %	Votes	Votes %	+/−
Labour	18	16	▲2	88.9	20	36	75.0	28,677	60.4	+1.1
Conservative	18	2	▼2	11.1	10	12	25.0	14,026	29.5	–4.9
Liberal Democrats	7	0	Steady	0.0	0	0	0.0	2,624	5.5	–0.5
Green	7	0	Steady	0.0	0	0	0.0	2,140	4.5	+4.2

== Ward results ==
Incumbent councillors standing for re-election are marked with an asterisk (*). Changes in seats do not take into account defections.

=== Bixley ===
Bixley
Party	Candidate	Votes	%	±%
Conservative	G. Pulford*	1,639	52.5	+1.3
Labour	T. Flurrie	765	24.5	+12.1
Liberal Democrats	M. Pakes	720	23.0	−13.4
Majority		874	28.0	+13.2
Turnout		3,124	54.4	+10.4
Registered electors		5,743		
Conservative hold		Swing	▼5.4	

=== Bridge ===
Bridge
Party	Candidate	Votes	%	±%
Labour	J. Powell*	1,670	67.4	−8.4
Conservative	D. Webb	445	18.4	−5.9
Green	J. Scott	351	14.2	N/A
Majority		1,225	49.0	−3.2
Turnout		2,466	44.5	+12.9
Registered electors		5,564		
Labour hold		Swing	▼1.3	

=== Broom Hill ===
Broom Hill
Party	Candidate	Votes	%	±%
Labour	L. Hardcastle	1,246	45.4	+7.2
Conservative	K. Roper*	942	34.3	−13.2
Liberal Democrats	J. Odell	323	11.8	+3.9
Green	S. Tooke	234	8.5	+2.1
Majority		304	11.1	N/A
Turnout		2,745	53.8	+16.6
Registered electors		5,102		
Labour gain from Conservative		Swing	▲10.2	

=== Castle Hill ===
Castle Hill
Party	Candidate	Votes	%	±%
Labour	D. Jabbar	1,326	41.6	+3.2
Conservative	R. Hunwicks*	1,302	40.8	−10.1
Liberal Democrats	G. Gray	560	17.6	+7.0
Majority		24	0.8	N/A
Turnout		3,188	54.2	+21.1
Registered electors		5,882		
Labour gain from Conservative		Swing	▲6.7	

=== Chantry ===
Chantry
Party	Candidate	Votes	%	±%
Labour	A. Smith*	1,648	78.3	±0.0
Conservative	N. Harrison	456	21.7	±0.0
Majority		1,192	56.6	±0.0
Turnout		2,104	45.1	+10.7
Registered electors		4,665		
Labour hold		Swing	0.0	

=== Gainsborough ===
Gainsborough
Party	Candidate	Votes	%	±%
Labour	D. Edwards*	2,383	81.9	+0.3
Conservative	A. Nunn	525	18.1	−0.3
Majority		1,858	63.8	+0.6
Turnout		2,908	48.7	+14.3
Registered electors		5,971		
Labour hold		Swing	▲0.3	

=== Priory Heath ===
Priory Heath
Party	Candidate	Votes	%	±%
Labour	D. Warsop*	1,916	72.4	−0.3
Conservative	D. Jackson	523	19.8	−3.0
Green	S. Budworth	208	7.9	N/A
Majority		1,393	52.6	+2.7
Turnout		2,647	47.9	+13.4
Registered electors		5,526		
Labour hold		Swing	▲1.4	

=== Rushmere ===
Rushmere
Party	Candidate	Votes	%	±%
Labour	C. Rawlinson*	2,015	62.1	+8.6
Conservative	M. Staggs	1,231	37.9	–3.6
Majority		784	24.2	+12.2
Turnout		3,246	55.7	+7.5
Registered electors		5,828		
Labour hold		Swing	▲6.1	

=== Sprites ===
Sprites
Party	Candidate	Votes	%	±%
Labour	I. Grimwood*	1,983	76.0	+2.7
Conservative	P. Hammond	626	24.0	−2.7
Majority		1,357	52.0	N/A
Turnout		2,609	45.0	+12.0
Registered electors		5,798		
Labour hold		Swing	▲2.7	

=== St Clements ===
St Clements
Party	Candidate	Votes	%	±%
Labour	E. Grant*	1,694	56.8	+5.7
Conservative	J. Goodwin	861	28.9	−15.0
Green	A. Slade	429	14.4	N/A
Majority		833	27.9	+20.7
Turnout		2,984	50.5	±0.0
Registered electors		5,904		
Labour hold		Swing	▲10.4	

=== St John's ===
St John's
Party	Candidate	Votes	%	±%
Labour	D. Ball*	1,634	55.6	−3.2
Conservative	A. Kingham	911	31.0	−3.1
Green	J. Sperling	392	13.3	N/A
Majority		723	24.6	−0.1
Turnout		2,937	48.0	+6.4
Registered electors		6,119		
Labour hold		Swing	▼0.1	

=== St Margaret's ===
St Margaret's
Party	Candidate	Votes	%	±%
Conservative	M. Hammond*	1,399	44.2	−5.6
Labour	Y. Marsen	1,294	40.9	+0.5
Liberal Democrats	D. McNulty	265	8.4	−1.4
Green	J. Mayhew	205	6.5	N/A
Majority		105	3.3	−6.1
Turnout		3,163	55.3	+17.5
Registered electors		5,720		
Conservative hold		Swing	▼3.1	

=== Stoke Park ===
Stoke Park
Party	Candidate	Votes	%	±%
Labour	C. West*	1,492	60.6	+2.2
Conservative	L. Green	720	29.2	−7.0
Liberal Democrats	J. Logan-Smith	251	10.2	+4.8
Majority		772	31.4	+9.2
Turnout		2,463	42.0	+6.0
Registered electors		5,864		
Labour hold		Swing	▲4.6	

=== Town ===
Town
Party	Candidate	Votes	%	±%
Labour	M. Harvey	1,471	65.0	−10.8
Conservative	C. Castle	472	20.8	−3.4
Green	B. Westren	321	14.2	N/A
Majority		999	44.2	−7.4
Turnout		2,264	40.3	+4.5
Registered electors		5,618		
Labour hold		Swing	▼3.7	

=== Whitehouse ===
Whitehouse (2 seats due to by-election)
Party	Candidate	Votes	%	±%
Labour	A. Grant	1,525	73.4	−1.5
Labour	D. Long	1,477	71.1	−3.8
Conservative	S. Laine	468	22.5	−2.6
Conservative	K. Thomas	403	19.4	−5.7
Liberal Democrats	E. Beattie	283	13.6	N/A
Turnout		~2,078	42.0	+9.7
Registered electors		4,948		
Labour hold				
Labour hold				

=== Whitton ===
Whitton (2 seats due to by-election)
Party	Candidate	Votes	%	±%
Labour	P. Gardiner*	1,610	72.2	+0.1
Labour	G. Clarke	1,528	68.5	−3.6
Conservative	E. Harsant	555	24.9	−3.0
Conservative	D. Thomas	548	24.6	−3.3
Liberal Democrats	D. Kennedy	222	9.9	N/A
Turnout		~2,231	45.5	+13.0
Registered electors		4,904		
Labour hold				
Labour hold				
