= 1991 Ipswich Borough Council election =

1991 English local government election

- 3 May 1991

17 out of 48 seats to Ipswich Borough Council 25 seats needed for a majority
	First party	Second party
Party	Labour	Conservative
Last election	36 seats, 60.4%	12 seats, 29.5%
Seats won	12	5
Seats after	37	11
Seat change	▲1	▼1
Popular vote	19,386	16,772
Percentage	49.8%	43.1%
Swing	▼10.6%	▲13.6%
- Winner of each seat at the 1991 Ipswich Borough Council election.
Control before election
Labour
Control after election
Labour

The 1991 Ipswich Borough Council election was an election to the Ipswich Borough Council under the arrangement, whereby a third of the councillors were to stand for election, each time.

It took place as part of the 1991 United Kingdom local elections.

There were 16 wards each returning one councillor plus one bye-election for Town Ward. The Labour Party retained control of the Council.

== Summary ==
=== Election result ===
1991 Ipswich Borough Council election
Party	This election				Full council			This election		
Party	Candidates	Seats	Net	Seats %	Other	Total	Total %	Votes	Votes %	+/−
Labour	17	12	▲1	70.6	25	37	77.1	19,386	49.8	–10.6
Conservative	17	5	▼1	29.4	6	11	22.9	16,772	43.1	+13.6
Liberal Democrats	5	0	Steady	0.0	0	0	0.0	1,956	5.0	–0.5
Green	3	0	Steady	0.0	0	0	0.0	822	2.1	–2.4

== Ward results ==
Incumbent councillors standing for re-election are marked with an asterisk (*). Changes in seats do not take into account defections.

=== Bixley ===
Bixley
Party	Candidate	Votes	%	±%
Conservative	W. Wright*	1,738	61.3	+8.8
Labour	C. Campbell	552	19.5	−5.0
Liberal Democrats	M. Pakes	545	19.2	−3.8
Majority		1,186	41.8	+13.8
Turnout		2,835	49.2	−5.2
Registered electors		5,757		
Conservative hold		Swing	▲6.9	

=== Bridge ===
Bridge
Party	Candidate	Votes	%	±%
Labour	P. Smart*	1,217	63.5	−3.9
Conservative	J. Smythe	699	36.5	+18.1
Majority		518	27.0	−22.0
Turnout		1,916	34.7	−9.8
Registered electors		5,521		
Labour hold		Swing	▼11.0	

=== Broom Hill ===
Broom Hill
Party	Candidate	Votes	%	±%
Conservative	R. Hunwicks	1,155	47.6	+13.3
Labour	S. Gibb	914	37.7	−7.7
Liberal Democrats	J. Odell	356	14.7	+2.9
Majority		241	9.9	N/A
Turnout		2,425	47.7	−6.1
Registered electors		5,089		
Conservative hold		Swing	▲10.5	

=== Castle Hill ===
Castle Hill
Party	Candidate	Votes	%	±%
Conservative	J. Cooper*	1,523	55.2	+14.4
Labour	N. Long	809	29.3	−12.3
Liberal Democrats	A. Grimsey	428	15.5	−2.1
Majority		714	25.9	N/A
Turnout		2,760	47.1	−7.1
Registered electors		5,858		
Conservative hold		Swing	▲13.4	

=== Chantry ===
Chantry
Party	Candidate	Votes	%	±%
Labour	D. Grimwood*	1,200	69.8	−8.5
Conservative	P. Murray-Cowan	519	30.2	+8.5
Majority		681	39.6	−17.0
Turnout		1,719	36.5	−8.6
Registered electors		4,715		
Labour hold		Swing	▼8.5	

=== Gainsborough ===
Gainsborough
Party	Candidate	Votes	%	±%
Labour	M. Alderton*	1,503	63.8	−18.1
Conservative	K. Matthews	640	27.2	+9.1
Green	V. Linehan	213	9.0	N/A
Majority		863	36.6	−27.2
Turnout		2,356	39.8	−8.9
Registered electors		5,915		
Labour hold		Swing	▼13.6	

=== Priory Heath ===
Priory Heath
Party	Candidate	Votes	%	±%
Labour	R. Brame*	1,413	66.1	−6.3
Conservative	D. Jackson	724	33.9	+14.1
Majority		689	32.2	−20.4
Turnout		2,137	38.7	−9.2
Registered electors		5,517		
Labour hold		Swing	▼10.2	

=== Rushmere ===
Rushmere
Party	Candidate	Votes	%	±%
Labour	R. Ray-Dobson	1,434	51.2	−10.9
Conservative	W. Fraser	1,368	48.8	+10.9
Majority		66	2.4	−21.8
Turnout		2,802	47.3	−8.4
Registered electors		5,922		
Labour gain from Conservative		Swing	▼10.9	

=== Sprites ===
Sprites
Party	Candidate	Votes	%	±%
Labour	A. Towns	1,355	62.6	−13.4
Conservative	J. Williams	808	37.4	+13.4
Majority		547	25.2	−16.8
Turnout		2,163	38.0	−7.0
Registered electors		5,692		
Labour hold		Swing	▼13.4	

=== St Clements ===
St Clements
Party	Candidate	Votes	%	±%
Conservative	R. Harsant*	1,417	48.1	+19.2
Labour	B. Coleman	1,240	42.0	−14.8
Green	J. Scott	292	9.9	−4.5
Majority		177	6.1	N/A
Turnout		2,949	51.7	+1.2
Registered electors		5,704		
Conservative hold		Swing	▲17.0	

=== St John's ===
St John's
Party	Candidate	Votes	%	±%
Labour	I. Warren	1,213	45.8	−9.8
Conservative	A. Nunn	1,120	42.3	+11.3
Green	A. Slade	317	12.0	−1.3
Majority		93	3.5	−21.1
Turnout		2,650	43.6	−4.4
Registered electors		6,082		
Labour hold		Swing	▼10.6	

=== St Margaret's ===
St Margaret's
Party	Candidate	Votes	%	±%
Conservative	D. Wright*	1,500	54.1	+9.9
Labour	D. Hampson	912	32.9	−8.0
Liberal Democrats	D. McNulty	363	13.1	+4.7
Majority		588	21.2	+17.9
Turnout		2,775	48.1	−7.2
Registered electors		5,775		
Conservative hold		Swing	▲9.0	

=== Stoke Park ===
Stoke Park
Party	Candidate	Votes	%	±%
Labour	D. Powell*	1,156	53.2	−7.4
Conservative	P. Button	1,015	46.8	+17.6
Majority		141	6.4	−25.0
Turnout		2,171	37.2	−4.8
Registered electors		5,832		
Labour hold		Swing	▼12.5	

=== Town ===
Town (2 seats due to by-election)
Party	Candidate	Votes	%	±%
Labour	S. Baguley*	1,272	64.1	−0.9
Labour	P. Breakwell	1,096	55.3	−9.7
Conservative	M. Baldry	711	35.8	+15.0
Conservative	A. Shave	592	29.8	+9.0
Turnout		~1,983	34.7	−5.6
Registered electors		5,716		
Labour hold				
Labour hold				

=== Whitehouse ===
Whitehouse
Party	Candidate	Votes	%	±%
Labour	D. Long	1,027	54.6	−12.4
Conservative	S. Laine	589	31.3	+10.7
Liberal Democrats	E. Beattie	264	14.0	+1.6
Majority		438	23.3	N/A
Turnout		1,880	34.1	−7.9
Registered electors		5,507		
Labour hold		Swing	▼11.6	

=== Whitton ===
Whitton
Party	Candidate	Votes	%	±%
Labour	G. Clarke	1,073	62.1	−5.3
Conservative	L. Green	654	37.9	+14.6
Majority		419	24.2	N/A
Turnout		1,727	32.8	−12.7
Registered electors		5,273		
Labour hold		Swing	▼10.0	
