= 1988 Ipswich Borough Council election =

1988 election results for Ipswich Borough Council

- 5 May 1988

18 out of 48 seats to Ipswich Borough Council 25 seats needed for a majority
	First party	Second party
Party	Labour	Conservative
Last election	33 seats, 43.4%	15 seats, 39.4%
Seats won	14	4
Seats after	34	14
Seat change	▲1	▼1
Popular vote	21,883	12,687
Percentage	59.3%	34.4%
Swing	▲15.9%	▼5.0%
- Winner of each seat at the 1988 Ipswich Borough Council election.
Control before election
Labour
Control after election
Labour

The 1988 Ipswich Borough Council election was an election to the Ipswich Borough Council under the arrangement, whereby a third of the councillors were to stand for election, each time.

It took place as part of the 1988 United Kingdom local elections.

There were 16 wards each returning one councillor plus two bye-elections one each for Sprites and Whitehouse Wards. The Labour Party retained control of the council.

== Summary ==
=== Election result ===
1988 Ipswich Borough Council election
Party	This election				Full council			This election		
Party	Candidates	Seats	Net	Seats %	Other	Total	Total %	Votes	Votes %	+/−
Labour	18	14	▲1	77.8	20	34	70.8	21,883	59.3	+15.9
Conservative	18	4	▼1	22.2	10	14	29.2	12,687	34.4	–5.0
SLD	9	0	Steady	0.0	0	0	0.0	2,196	6.0	–11.2
Green	1	0	Steady	0.0	0	0	0.0	123	0.3	N/A

== Ward results ==
Incumbent councillors standing for re-election are marked with an asterisk (*). Changes in seats do not take into account defections.

=== Bixley ===
Bixley
Party	Candidate	Votes	%	±%
Conservative	J. Shorten*	1,333	51.2	±0.0
SLD	K. Howkins	949	36.4	−0.3
Labour	J. Peacock	322	12.4	+0.3
Majority		384	14.8	+0.3
Turnout		2,604	44.0	−7.2
Registered electors		5,918		
Conservative hold		Swing	▲0.2	

=== Bridge ===
Bridge
Party	Candidate	Votes	%	±%
Labour	D. Turnbull*	1,332	76.1	+18.1
Conservative	L. Green	419	23.9	−4.0
Majority		913	52.2	+22.1
Turnout		1,751	31.6	−2.7
Registered electors		5,541		
Labour hold		Swing	▲11.1	

=== Broom Hill ===
Broom Hill
Party	Candidate	Votes	%	±%
Conservative	H. Davies	911	47.5	−9.3
Labour	D. Aitchison	733	38.2	+11.4
SLD	G. Gray	151	7.9	−8.5
Green	S. Tooke	123	6.4	N/A
Majority		178	9.3	−20.7
Turnout		1,918	37.2	−7.3
Registered electors		5,156		
Conservative hold		Swing	▼10.4	

=== Castle Hill ===
Castle Hill
Party	Candidate	Votes	%	±%
Conservative	B. Jay	1,010	50.9	−2.8
Labour	J. Metcalfe	762	38.4	+16.4
SLD	N. Cheeseman	211	10.6	−13.7
Majority		248	12.5	−16.9
Turnout		1,983	33.1	−8.3
Registered electors		5,991		
Conservative hold		Swing	▼9.6	

=== Chantry ===
Chantry
Party	Candidate	Votes	%	±%
Labour	J. Cann*	1,270	78.3	+14.4
Conservative	C. Body	351	21.7	−3.6
Majority		919	56.6	+18.0
Turnout		1,621	34.4	−0.4
Registered electors		4,712		
Labour hold		Swing	▲9.0	

=== Gainsborough ===
Gainsborough
Party	Candidate	Votes	%	±%
Labour	J. Mowles*	1,656	81.6	+8.7
Conservative	G. Morris	374	18.4	+0.4
Majority		1,282	63.2	+8.3
Turnout		2,030	34.4	−2.9
Registered electors		5,901		
Labour hold		Swing	▲4.2	

=== Priory Heath ===
Priory Heath
Party	Candidate	Votes	%	±%
Labour	W. Quinton*	1,420	72.7	+9.4
Conservative	K. Thomas	445	22.8	−2.6
SLD	A. Howlett	88	4.5	−6.7
Majority		975	49.9	+12.0
Turnout		1,953	34.5	−3.0
Registered electors		5,661		
Labour hold		Swing	▲6.0	

=== Rushmere ===
Rushmere
Party	Candidate	Votes	%	±%
Labour	G. Auton*	1,532	53.5	+13.7
Conservative	T. Wright	1,189	41.5	−2.8
SLD	D. Jackson	144	5.0	−10.9
Majority		343	12.0	N/A
Turnout		2,865	48.2	−7.5
Registered electors		5,944		
Labour hold		Swing	▲8.3	

=== Sprites ===
Sprites (2 seats due to by-election)
Party	Candidate	Votes	%	±%
Labour	J. Cubbin	1,411	77.2	+22.0
Labour	A. Towns	1,287	70.4	+15.2
Conservative	P. Hammond	513	28.1	−1.5
Conservative	J. Young	445	24.3	−5.3
Turnout		~1,828	33.0	−2.0
Registered electors		5,539		
Labour hold				
Labour hold				

=== St Clements ===
St Clements
Party	Candidate	Votes	%	±%
Labour	A. Elliott	1,479	51.1	+9.1
Conservative	R. Baldry*	1,271	43.9	−1.8
SLD	B. Carter	147	5.1	−7.2
Majority		208	7.2	N/A
Turnout		2,897	50.5	−2.5
Registered electors		5,737		
Labour gain from Conservative		Swing	▲5.5	

=== St John's ===
St John's
Party	Candidate	Votes	%	±%
Labour	A. Macknelly	1,471	58.8	+14.2
Conservative	A. Kingham	853	34.1	−4.8
SLD	F. Cornish	176	7.0	−9.5
Majority		618	24.7	+19.0
Turnout		2,500	41.6	−4.5
Registered electors		6,010		
Labour hold		Swing	▲9.5	

=== St Margaret's ===
St Margaret's
Party	Candidate	Votes	%	±%
Conservative	A. Thrussell	1,101	49.8	+0.8
Labour	J. Harris	893	40.4	+12.3
SLD	J. Groves	217	9.8	−13.1
Majority		208	9.4	N/A
Turnout		2,211	37.8	−11.0
Registered electors		5,849		
Conservative hold		Swing	▼5.8	

=== Stoke Park ===
Stoke Park
Party	Candidate	Votes	%	±%
Labour	K. Wilson*	1,218	58.4	+13.0
Conservative	P. De Bankes	754	36.2	−4.5
SLD	M. Redbond	113	5.4	−8.5
Majority		464	22.2	+17.5
Turnout		2,085	36.0	−1.6
Registered electors		5,792		
Labour hold		Swing	▲8.8	

=== Town ===
Town
Party	Candidate	Votes	%	±%
Labour	B. Shelley	1,484	75.8	+17.5
Conservative	D. Goldsmith	474	24.2	−4.9
Majority		1,010	51.6	+22.4
Turnout		1,958	35.8	−2.0
Registered electors		5,469		
Labour hold		Swing	▲11.2	

=== Whitehouse ===
Whitehouse (2 seats due to by-election)
Party	Candidate	Votes	%	±%
Labour	G. King*	1,255	81.3	+21.8
Labour	A. Grant	1,083	70.1	+10.6
Conservative	M. Bronn	421	27.3	+2.3
Conservative	S. Laine	330	21.4	−3.6
Turnout		~1,545	32.3	−1.9
Registered electors		4,782		
Labour hold				
Labour hold				

=== Whitton ===
Whitton
Party	Candidate	Votes	%	±%
Labour	R. Caley*	1,275	72.1	+13.1
Conservative	S. Fuller	493	27.9	−1.7
Majority		782	44.2	+14.8
Turnout		1,768	32.5	−1.8
Registered electors		5,440		
Labour hold		Swing	▲7.4	
