= 1982 Ipswich Borough Council election =

1982 election results for Ipswich Borough Council

- 1 May 1982

16 out of 48 seats to Ipswich Borough Council 25 seats needed for a majority
	First party	Second party
Party	Labour	Conservative
Last election	32 seats, 57.1%	16 seats, 41.0%
Seats won	10	6
Seats after	32	16
Seat change	Steady	Steady
Popular vote	15,455	13,266
Percentage	44.2%	37.9%
Swing	▼12.9%	▼3.1%
- Winner of each seat at the 1982 Ipswich Borough Council election.
Control before election
Labour
Control after election
Labour

The 1982 Ipswich Borough Council election was the second election to the Ipswich Borough Council under the system of electing by thirds, whereby a third of the councillors were to stand for election, each time. These new arrangements had been determined by the Local Government Boundary Commission as laid out in their Report 280.

It took place as part of the 1982 United Kingdom local elections.

There were 16 wards each returning one councillor. The Labour Party retained control of the Council.

== Summary ==
=== Election result ===
1982 Ipswich Borough Council election
Party	This election				Full council			This election		
Party	Candidates	Seats	Net	Seats %	Other	Total	Total %	Votes	Votes %	+/−
Labour	16	10	Steady	62.5	22	32	66.7	15,455	44.2	–12.9
Conservative	16	6	Steady	37.5	10	16	33.3	13,266	37.9	–3.1
Alliance	16	0	Steady	0.0	0	0	0.0	6,164	17.6	+15.7
Independent	2	0	Steady	0.0	0	0	0.0	62	0.2	N/A
SDP	1	0	Steady	0.0	0	0	0.0	25	0.1	N/A

== Ward results ==
Incumbent councillors standing for re-election are marked with an asterisk (*). Changes in seats do not take into account defections.

=== Bixley ===
Bixley
Party	Candidate	Votes	%	±%
Conservative	G. Pulford	1,637	68.2	−9.2
Labour	I. Grimwood	372	15.5	−7.1
Alliance	J. Coombes	368	15.3	N/A
Independent	P. Watkins	25	1.0	N/A
Majority		1,265	52.7	−2.1
Turnout		2,402	40.6	+6.7
Registered electors		5,921		
Conservative hold		Swing	▼1.1	

=== Bridge ===
Bridge
Party	Candidate	Votes	%	±%
Labour	J. Powell	1,282	63.7	−11.8
Conservative	S. Knights	492	24.4	−0.1
Alliance	B. Oliver	240	11.9	N/A
Majority		790	39.3	−11.7
Turnout		2,014	36.9	−28.3
Registered electors		5,452		
Labour hold		Swing	▼5.9	

=== Broom Hill ===
Broom Hill
Party	Candidate	Votes	%	±%
Conservative	A. Rampling*	1,231	56.1	−2.9
Alliance	T. Barnard	494	22.5	+12.2
Labour	A. Ross	470	21.4	−9.3
Majority		737	33.6	+5.3
Turnout		2,195	40.9	+2.4
Registered electors		5,361		
Conservative hold		Swing	▼7.6	

=== Castle Hill ===
Castle Hill
Party	Candidate	Votes	%	±%
Conservative	G. Scotcher*	1,334	57.2	−2.4
Labour	J. Dymond	554	23.8	−16.6
Alliance	E. Pearl	443	19.0	N/A
Majority		780	33.4	+14.2
Turnout		2,331	39.1	+2.8
Registered electors		5,960		
Conservative hold		Swing	▲7.1	

=== Chantry ===
Chantry
Party	Candidate	Votes	%	±%
Labour	A. Smith*	866	64.7	−16.1
Alliance	A. Cook	255	19.1	N/A
Conservative	M. Levett	217	16.2	−3.0
Majority		611	45.6	−16.0
Turnout		1,338	30.8	−3.3
Registered electors		4,348		
Labour hold				

=== Gainsborough ===
Gainsborough
Party	Candidate	Votes	%	±%
Labour	D. Edwards*	1,383	71.5	−8.3
Conservative	J. Young	327	16.9	−3.3
Alliance	I. Roche	187	9.7	N/A
Independent	D. Patten	37	1.9	N/A
Majority		1,056	54.6	−5.0
Turnout		1,934	34.7	−2.5
Registered electors		5,580		
Labour hold		Swing	▼2.5	

=== Priory Heath ===
Priory Heath
Party	Candidate	Votes	%	±%
Labour	R. Risebrow	1,280	57.2	−12.4
Conservative	B. Moore	534	23.9	−6.5
Alliance	P. Hennessey	398	17.8	N/A
SDP	P. Green	25	1.1	N/A
Majority		746	33.4	−5.8
Turnout		2,237	39.0	+5.8
Registered electors		5,737		
Labour hold		Swing	▼3.0	

=== Rushmere ===
Rushmere
Party	Candidate	Votes	%	±%
Conservative	R. Cook	1,267	41.2	−8.3
Labour	G. Rusher	1,174	38.2	−12.3
Alliance	B. Taylor	633	20.6	N/A
Majority		93	3.0	N/A
Turnout		3,074	51.9	+0.5
Registered electors		5,927		
Conservative hold		Swing	▲2.0	

=== Sprites ===
Sprites
Party	Candidate	Votes	%	±%
Labour	D. Packard*	1,068	55.5	−19.4
Conservative	B. Paternoster	532	27.6	+2.5
Alliance	N. Sanderson	326	16.9	N/A
Majority		536	27.9	−21.9
Turnout		1,926	28.4	−2.1
Registered electors		6,789		
Labour hold		Swing	▼11.0	

=== St Clements ===
St Clements
Party	Candidate	Votes	%	±%
Labour	E. Grant*	1,140	42.9	−12.6
Conservative	J. Cooper	1,013	38.1	−6.4
Alliance	K. Prior	504	19.0	N/A
Majority		127	4.8	−6.2
Turnout		2,657	45.2	+1.9
Registered electors		5,876		
Labour hold		Swing	▼3.1	

=== St John's ===
St John's
Party	Candidate	Votes	%	±%
Conservative	M. Hammond*	1,085	42.2	+0.3
Labour	R. Canty	1,065	41.4	−16.7
Alliance	P. Saunders	422	16.4	N/A
Majority		20	0.8	N/A
Turnout		2,572	44.2	+0.5
Registered electors		5,818		
Conservative hold		Swing	▲8.5	

=== St Margaret's ===
St Margaret's
Party	Candidate	Votes	%	±%
Conservative	D. Marrlott*	1,453	60.2	−7.7
Labour	T. Hagan	573	23.7	−8.4
Alliance	A. Holden	388	16.1	N/A
Majority		880	36.5	+0.7
Turnout		2,414	40.5	+2.3
Registered electors		5,958		
Conservative hold		Swing	▲0.4	

=== Stoke Park ===
Stoke Park
Party	Candidate	Votes	%	±%
Labour	J. West	857	42.0	−12.6
Conservative	G. Catling	711	34.9	+3.7
Alliance	K. Pettican	471	23.1	+8.9
Majority		146	7.1	−16.3
Turnout		2,039	35.2	−0.6
Registered electors		5,786		
Labour hold		Swing	▼8.2	

=== Town ===
Town
Party	Candidate	Votes	%	±%
Labour	F. Yule*	1,112	53.3	−12.2
Conservative	G. Dalby	612	29.3	−5.2
Alliance	R. Hyde	362	17.4	N/A
Majority		500	24.0	−7.0
Turnout		2,086	39.2	+3.7
Registered electors		5,326		
Labour hold		Swing	▼3.5	

=== Whitehouse ===
Whitehouse
Party	Candidate	Votes	%	±%
Labour	H. Beales*	1,008	55.2	−11.6
Alliance	D. Eaton	421	23.1	+14.1
Conservative	M. Hutton	397	21.7	−2.5
Majority		587	32.1	−10.5
Turnout		1,826	33.7	+0.9
Registered electors		5,411		
Labour hold		Swing	▼12.9	

=== Whitton ===
Whitton
Party	Candidate	Votes	%	±%
Labour	P. Gardiner*	1,251	64.9	−11.9
Conservative	P. Bartrum	424	22.0	−1.2
Alliance	L. Miernik	252	13.1	N/A
Majority		827	42.9	−10.7
Turnout		1,927	35.3	+1.1
Registered electors		5,460		
Labour hold		Swing	▼5.4	
