= 1995 Ipswich Borough Council election =

1995 election results for Ipswich Borough Council

- 4 May 1995

16 out of 48 seats to Ipswich Borough Council 25 seats needed for a majority
	First party	Second party	Third party
Party	Labour	Conservative	Liberal Democrats
Last election	33 seats, 51.6%	14 seats, 27.8%	1 seat, 19.1%
Seats won	14	2	0
Seats after	36	11	1
Seat change	▲3	▼3	Steady
Popular vote	19,240	7,293	3,952
Percentage	63.0%	23.9%	12.9%
Swing	▲11.4%	▼3.9%	▼6.2%
- Winner of each seat at the 1995 Ipswich Borough Council election.
Control before election
Labour
Control after election
Labour

The 1995 Ipswich Borough Council election was an election to the Ipswich Borough Council under the arrangement, whereby a third of the councillors were to stand for election, each time.

It took place as part of the 1995 United Kingdom local elections.

There were 16 wards each returning one councillor plus one bye-election for Sprites Ward. The Labour Party retained control of the Council.

== Summary ==
=== Election result ===
1995 Ipswich Borough Council election
Party	This election				Full council			This election		
Party	Candidates	Seats	Net	Seats %	Other	Total	Total %	Votes	Votes %	+/−
Labour	16	14	▲3	87.5	22	36	75.0	19,240	63.0	+11.4
Conservative	16	2	▼3	12.5	9	11	22.9	7,293	23.9	–3.9
Liberal Democrats	15	0	Steady	0.0	1	1	2.1	3,952	12.9	–6.2
Militant Labour	1	0	Steady	0.0	0	0	0.0	63	0.2	N/A

== Ward results ==
Incumbent councillors standing for re-election are marked with an asterisk (*). Changes in seats do not take into account defections.

=== Bixley ===
Bixley
Party	Candidate	Votes	%	±%
Conservative	W. Wright*	942	43.6	−4.6
Labour	C. Le Grys	703	32.5	+7.2
Liberal Democrats	R. Whitmore	515	23.8	−2.7
Majority		239	11.1	−10.6
Turnout		2,160	38.0	−6.6
Registered electors		5,677		
Conservative hold		Swing	▼5.9	

=== Bridge ===
Bridge
Party	Candidate	Votes	%	±%
Labour	P. Smart*	1,180	74.6	+8.1
Conservative	M. Parnell	258	16.3	−2.2
Liberal Democrats	N. Day	144	9.1	−1.8
Majority		922	58.3	+10.3
Turnout		1,582	28.4	−5.6
Registered electors		5,585		
Labour hold		Swing	▲5.2	

=== Broom Hill ===
Broom Hill
Party	Candidate	Votes	%	±%
Labour	G. Goodall	912	50.6	+14.2
Conservative	R. Hunwicks*	628	34.8	−4.7
Liberal Democrats	D. Day	264	14.6	−9.5
Majority		284	15.8	N/A
Turnout		1,804	35.3	−5.7
Registered electors		5,117		
Labour gain from Conservative		Swing	▲9.5	

=== Castle Hill ===
Castle Hill
Party	Candidate	Votes	%	±%
Labour	T. Payne	1,445	57.9	+17.5
Conservative	J. Cooper*	845	33.9	−4.7
Liberal Democrats	A. Houseley	206	8.3	−12.7
Majority		600	24.0	+22.2
Turnout		2,496	43.3	+0.3
Registered electors		5,766		
Labour gain from Conservative		Swing	▲11.1	

=== Chantry ===
Chantry
Party	Candidate	Votes	%	±%
Labour	D. Ellesmere	1,085	78.8	+7.1
Conservative	S. Lark	178	12.9	−2.9
Liberal Democrats	D. Perkins	114	8.3	−4.2
Majority		907	65.9	+10.0
Turnout		1,377	30.6	−3.4
Registered electors		4,512		
Labour hold		Swing	▲5.0	

=== Gainsborough ===
Gainsborough
Party	Candidate	Votes	%	±%
Labour	M. Alderton*	1,486	77.2	+19.4
Conservative	K. Matthews	261	13.6	−4.8
Liberal Democrats	R. Atkins	177	9.2	−14.6
Majority		1,225	63.6	+29.6
Turnout		1,924	33.2	−5.7
Registered electors		5,791		
Labour hold		Swing	▲12.1	

=== Priory Heath ===
Priory Heath
Party	Candidate	Votes	%	±%
Labour	B. Maguire	1,258	72.3	+10.3
Conservative	M. Baldry	291	16.7	−2.7
Liberal Democrats	N. Moloney	192	11.0	−7.5
Majority		967	55.6	+13.0
Turnout		1,741	32.6	−2.0
Registered electors		5,349		
Labour hold		Swing	▲6.5	

=== Rushmere ===
Rushmere
Party	Candidate	Votes	%	±%
Labour	R. Ray-Dobson*	1,524	62.0	+6.8
Conservative	D. Ward	578	23.5	−6.2
Liberal Democrats	G. Auton	357	14.5	−0.5
Majority		946	38.5	+13.0
Turnout		2,459	41.0	−3.8
Registered electors		6,001		
Labour hold		Swing	▲6.5	

=== Sprites ===
Sprites
Party	Candidate	Votes	%	±%
Labour	M. Ketteringham*	1,382	75.8	+7.2
Conservative	C. Fisher	264	14.5	−2.8
Liberal Democrats	J. Eddy	178	9.8	−4.3
Majority		1,118	61.1	+10.0
Turnout		1,824	33.9	−3.0
Registered electors		5,383		
Labour hold		Swing	▲5.0	

=== St Clements ===
St Clements
Party	Candidate	Votes	%	±%
Labour	A. Elliott	1,337	63.1	+11.6
Conservative	G. Morris	510	24.1	−1.3
Liberal Democrats	P. Richardson	273	12.9	−5.5
Majority		827	39.0	+12.9
Turnout		2,120	37.1	−8.0
Registered electors		5,730		
Labour gain from Conservative		Swing	▲6.5	

=== St John's ===
St John's
Party	Candidate	Votes	%	±%
Labour	A. Macknelly*	1,436	71.0	+18.4
Conservative	E. Spong	587	29.0	−1.3
Majority		849	42.0	+19.7
Turnout		2,023	33.9	−5.3
Registered electors		5,973		
Labour hold		Swing	▲9.9	

=== St Margaret's ===
St Margaret's
Party	Candidate	Votes	%	±%
Conservative	P. West	956	36.0	+1.0
Labour	A. Murray	865	32.6	+8.1
Liberal Democrats	N. Cheeseman	834	31.4	−6.8
Majority		91	3.4	N/A
Turnout		2,655	44.0	−6.0
Registered electors		6,027		
Conservative hold		Swing	▼3.6	

=== Stoke Park ===
Stoke Park
Party	Candidate	Votes	%	±%
Labour	M. Cook	1,066	67.1	+14.1
Conservative	G. Terry	313	19.7	−11.8
Liberal Democrats	J. Logan-Smith	210	13.2	−2.3
Majority		753	47.4	N/A
Turnout		1,589	28.3	−7.4
Registered electors		5,616		
Labour hold		Swing	▲13.0	

=== Town ===
Town
Party	Candidate	Votes	%	±%
Labour	S. Baguley*	1,339	71.5	+8.5
Conservative	D. Goldsmith	270	14.4	−4.2
Liberal Democrats	L. Redpath	200	10.7	−7.7
Militant Labour	T. Mackay	63	3.4	N/A
Majority		1,069	57.1	+12.7
Turnout		1,872	31.5	−2.0
Registered electors		5,953		
Labour hold		Swing	▲6.4	

=== Whitehouse ===
Whitehouse
Party	Candidate	Votes	%	±%
Labour	R. Penn*	1,141	77.1	+19.8
Conservative	D. Read	195	13.2	−2.3
Liberal Democrats	E. Beattie	144	9.7	−1.7
Majority		946	63.9	+22.4
Turnout		1,480	27.1	−5.4
Registered electors		5,469		
Labour hold		Swing	▲11.1	

=== Whitton ===
Whitton
Party	Candidate	Votes	%	±%
Labour	G. Clarke*	1,081	75.0	+6.8
Conservative	S. Fuller	217	15.0	−2.4
Liberal Democrats	B. Fearnley	144	10.0	−4.4
Majority		864	60.0	+9.2
Turnout		1,442	28.2	−4.1
Registered electors		5,012		
Labour hold		Swing	▲4.6	
