= 1987 Ipswich Borough Council election =

1987 election results for Ipswich Borough Council

- 8 May 1987

17 out of 48 seats to Ipswich Borough Council 25 seats needed for a majority
	First party	Second party
Party	Labour	Conservative
Last election	32 seats, 54.4%	16 seats, 30.7%
Seats won	10	7
Seats after	33	15
Seat change	▲1	▼1
Popular vote	17,447	15,856
Percentage	43.4%	39.4%
Swing	▼11.0%	▲8.7%
- Winner of each seat at the 1987 Ipswich Borough Council election.
Control before election
Labour
Control after election
Labour

The 1987 Ipswich Borough Council election was an election to the Ipswich Borough Council under the arrangement, whereby a third of the councillors were to stand for election, each time.

It took place as part of the 1987 United Kingdom local elections.

There were 16 wards each returning one councillor plus one bye-election for St Margaret's Ward. The Labour Party retained control of the council.

== Summary ==
=== Election result ===
1987 Ipswich Borough Council election
Party	This election				Full council			This election		
Party	Candidates	Seats	Net	Seats %	Other	Total	Total %	Votes	Votes %	+/−
Labour	17	10	▲1	58.8	22	33	68.8	17,447	43.4	–11.0
Conservative	17	7	▼1	41.2	8	15	31.3	15,856	39.4	+8.7
Alliance	17	0	Steady	0.0	0	0	0.0	6,915	17.2	+2.3

== Ward results ==
Incumbent councillors standing for re-election are marked with an asterisk (*). Changes in seats do not take into account defections.

=== Bixley ===
Bixley
Party	Candidate	Votes	%	±%
Conservative	B. Wright	1,541	51.2	+0.3
Alliance	K. Howkins	1,104	36.7	+4.4
Labour	J. Peacock	364	12.1	−4.7
Majority		437	14.5	−4.1
Turnout		3,009	51.2	+9.3
Registered electors		5,872		
Conservative hold		Swing	▼2.1	

=== Bridge ===
Bridge
Party	Candidate	Votes	%	±%
Labour	P. Smart*	1,103	58.0	−14.5
Conservative	D. Baxter	530	27.9	+11.1
Alliance	I. Goddard	268	14.1	+3.4
Majority		573	30.1	−25.6
Turnout		1,901	34.3	+2.4
Registered electors		5,548		
Labour hold		Swing	▼12.8	

=== Broom Hill ===
Broom Hill
Party	Candidate	Votes	%	±%
Conservative	R. Driver*	1,319	56.8	+7.3
Labour	R. Sudds	623	26.8	−1.9
Alliance	M. Gray	381	16.4	−5.4
Majority		696	30.0	+9.2
Turnout		2,323	44.5	+10.1
Registered electors		5,226		
Conservative hold		Swing	▲4.6	

=== Castle Hill ===
Castle Hill
Party	Candidate	Votes	%	±%
Conservative	J. Cooper*	1,327	53.7	+6.2
Alliance	N. Cheeseman	601	24.3	+2.8
Labour	A. Grant	545	22.0	−9.0
Majority		726	29.4	+12.9
Turnout		2,473	41.4	+7.9
Registered electors		5,973		
Conservative hold		Swing	▲6.5	

=== Chantry ===
Chantry
Party	Candidate	Votes	%	±%
Labour	D. Grimwood*	1,029	63.9	−13.1
Conservative	A. Kingham	407	25.3	+10.0
Alliance	N. Ramsden	174	10.8	+3.0
Majority		622	38.6	−23.1
Turnout		1,610	34.8	+6.2
Registered electors		4,625		
Labour hold		Swing	▼11.6	

=== Gainsborough ===
Gainsborough
Party	Candidate	Votes	%	±%
Labour	M. Alderton*	1,606	72.9	−7.8
Conservative	J. Young	397	18.0	+5.3
Alliance	P. Ablett	199	9.0	+2.4
Majority		1,209	54.9	−13.1
Turnout		2,202	37.3	+4.0
Registered electors		5,896		
Labour hold		Swing	▼6.6	

=== Priory Heath ===
Priory Heath
Party	Candidate	Votes	%	±%
Labour	R. Brame	1,342	63.3	−4.5
Conservative	L. Howard	539	25.4	+4.4
Alliance	B. Taylor	237	11.2	+0.1
Majority		803	37.9	−9.0
Turnout		2,118	37.5	+4.2
Registered electors		5,649		
Labour hold		Swing	▼4.5	

=== Rushmere ===
Rushmere
Party	Candidate	Votes	%	±%
Conservative	K. Boynes*	1,472	44.3	+7.3
Labour	B. Shelley	1,325	39.8	−7.4
Alliance	B. Taylor	528	15.9	±0.0
Majority		147	4.5	N/A
Turnout		3,325	55.7	+8.5
Registered electors		5,972		
Conservative hold		Swing	▲7.4	

=== Sprites ===
Sprites
Party	Candidate	Votes	%	±%
Labour	V. Nice	1,092	55.2	−13.6
Conservative	K. Thomas	586	29.6	+10.1
Alliance	J. Buckle	301	15.2	+3.5
Majority		506	25.6	N/A
Turnout		1,979	35.0	+6.4
Registered electors		5,659		
Labour hold		Swing	▼11.9	

=== St Clements ===
St Clements
Party	Candidate	Votes	%	±%
Conservative	R. Harsant*	1,395	45.7	+7.5
Labour	A. Elliott	1,283	42.0	−4.8
Alliance	K. Prior	374	12.3	−2.7
Majority		112	3.7	N/A
Turnout		3,052	53.0	+4.7
Registered electors		5,761		
Conservative hold		Swing	▲6.2	

=== St John's ===
St John's
Party	Candidate	Votes	%	±%
Labour	I. Macy	1,234	44.6	−6.4
Conservative	A. Ford	1,076	38.9	+2.6
Alliance	A. Howlett	456	16.5	+3.9
Majority		158	5.7	−9.0
Turnout		2,766	46.1	+4.5
Registered electors		5,998		
Labour gain from Conservative		Swing	▼4.5	

=== St Margaret's ===
St Margaret's (2 seats due to by-election)
Party	Candidate	Votes	%	±%
Conservative	D. Wright	1,390	49.0	+5.8
Conservative	A. Thrussell	1,385	48.8	+5.6
Labour	S. Goodall	797	28.1	−1.1
Labour	S. Sanford	751	26.5	−2.7
Alliance	R. Atkins	650	22.9	−4.7
Alliance	J. Manley	590	20.8	−6.8
Turnout		~2,839	48.8	+7.6
Registered electors		5,817		
Conservative hold				
Conservative hold				

=== Stoke Park ===
Stoke Park
Party	Candidate	Votes	%	±%
Labour	D. Powell	998	45.4	−10.3
Conservative	C. Body	896	40.7	+9.6
Alliance	M. Redbond	306	13.9	+0.7
Majority		102	4.7	−19.9
Turnout		2,200	37.6	+6.9
Registered electors		5,850		
Labour hold		Swing	▼10.0	

=== Town ===
Town
Party	Candidate	Votes	%	±%
Labour	S. Baguley*	1,208	58.3	−9.7
Conservative	D. Goldsmith	603	29.1	+7.5
Alliance	M. Eggleston	261	12.6	+2.2
Majority		605	29.2	−17.2
Turnout		2,072	37.8	+4.1
Registered electors		5,481		
Labour hold		Swing	▼8.6	

=== Whitehouse ===
Whitehouse
Party	Candidate	Votes	%	±%
Labour	J. Selway	1,042	59.5	−7.6
Conservative	L. Green	438	25.0	+5.5
Alliance	E. Beattie	272	15.5	+2.1
Majority		604	34.5	−13.1
Turnout		1,752	34.2	+5.1
Registered electors		5,116		
Labour hold		Swing	▼6.6	

=== Whitton ===
Whitton
Party	Candidate	Votes	%	±%
Labour	K. Wilcox*	1,105	59.0	−17.7
Conservative	S. Fuller	555	29.6	+6.3
Alliance	D. Kennedy	213	11.4	N/A
Majority		550	29.4	−24.0
Turnout		1,873	34.3	+4.7
Registered electors		5,453		
Labour hold		Swing	▼12.0	
