= 1986 Ipswich Borough Council election =

1984 election results for Ipswich Borough Council

- 8 May 1986

18 out of 48 seats to Ipswich Borough Council 25 seats needed for a majority
	First party	Second party
Party	Labour	Conservative
Last election	30 seats, 50.6%	18 seats, 37.9%
Seats won	14	4
Seats after	32	16
Seat change	▲2	▼2
Popular vote	19,226	10,873
Percentage	54.4%	30.7%
Swing	▲3.8%	▼7.2%
- Winner of each seat at the 1986 Ipswich Borough Council election.
Control before election
Labour
Control after election
Labour

The 1986 Ipswich Borough Council election was an election to the Ipswich Borough Council under the arrangement, whereby a third of the councillors were to stand for election, each time.

It took place as part of the 1986 United Kingdom local elections.

There were 16 wards each returning one councillor plus two bye-elections for Sprites Ward. The Labour Party retained control of the Council.

== Summary ==
=== Election result ===
1986 Ipswich Borough Council election
Party	This election				Full council			This election		
Party	Candidates	Seats	Net	Seats %	Other	Total	Total %	Votes	Votes %	+/−
Labour	18	14	▲2	77.8	18	32	66.7	19,226	54.4	+3.8
Conservative	18	4	▼2	22.2	12	16	33.3	10,873	30.7	–7.2
Alliance	17	0	Steady	0.0	0	0	0.0	5,272	14.9	+3.4

== Ward results ==
Incumbent councillors standing for re-election are marked with an asterisk (*). Changes in seats do not take into account defections.

=== Bixley ===
Bixley
Party	Candidate	Votes	%	±%
Conservative	G. Pulford*	1,243	50.9	−16.0
Alliance	K. Howkins	788	32.3	+18.1
Labour	E. Urry	410	16.8	−2.1
Majority		455	18.6	−29.4
Turnout		2,441	41.9	+6.5
Registered electors		5,826		
Conservative hold		Swing	▼17.1	

=== Bridge ===
Bridge
Party	Candidate	Votes	%	±%
Labour	J. Powell*	1,285	72.5	+6.1
Conservative	J. Young	298	16.8	−7.2
Alliance	M. Eggleston	189	10.7	+1.1
Majority		987	55.7	+13.3
Turnout		1,772	31.9	−2.9
Registered electors		5,555		
Labour hold		Swing	▲6.7	

=== Broom Hill ===
Broom Hill
Party	Candidate	Votes	%	±%
Conservative	K. Roper	901	49.5	−9.3
Labour	M. Vaughan	523	28.7	+1.7
Alliance	G. Gray	398	21.8	+7.7
Majority		378	20.8	−11.0
Turnout		1,822	34.4	−2.4
Registered electors		5,297		
Conservative hold		Swing	▼5.5	

=== Castle Hill ===
Castle Hill
Party	Candidate	Votes	%	±%
Conservative	R. Hunwicks	948	47.5	−5.3
Labour	S. Sandford	619	31.0	+0.1
Alliance	N. Cheeseman	428	21.5	+5.2
Majority		329	16.5	−5.4
Turnout		1,995	33.5	−2.2
Registered electors		5,955		
Conservative hold		Swing	▼2.7	

=== Chantry ===
Chantry
Party	Candidate	Votes	%	±%
Labour	A. Smith*	999	77.0	+2.8
Conservative	P. Murray-Cowan	198	15.3	−3.9
Alliance	A. Cook	101	7.8	+1.2
Majority		801	61.7	+6.7
Turnout		1,298	28.6	−0.7
Registered electors		4,358		
Labour hold		Swing	▲3.4	

=== Gainsborough ===
Gainsborough
Party	Candidate	Votes	%	±%
Labour	D. Edwards*	1,583	80.7	+1.9
Conservative	G. Morris	249	12.7	−3.2
Alliance	P. Ablitt	130	6.6	+1.3
Majority		1,334	68.0	+5.1
Turnout		1,962	33.3	−0.2
Registered electors		5,892		
Labour hold		Swing	▲2.6	

=== Priory Heath ===
Priory Heath
Party	Candidate	Votes	%	±%
Labour	D. Warsop*	1,275	67.9	+2.7
Conservative	P. Hammond	394	21.0	−6.5
Alliance	R. Hawkins	208	11.1	+3.8
Majority		881	46.9	+9.2
Turnout		1,877	33.3	−1.6
Registered electors		5,637		
Labour hold		Swing	▲4.6	

=== Rushmere ===
Rushmere
Party	Candidate	Votes	%	±%
Labour	C. Rawlinson	1,336	47.2	+0.7
Conservative	O. Cook	1,047	37.0	−2.1
Alliance	B. Taylor	449	15.9	+1.5
Majority		289	10.2	+2.8
Turnout		2,832	47.2	−5.2
Registered electors		6,000		
Labour gain from Conservative		Swing	▲1.4	

=== Sprites ===
Sprites (3 seats due to by-elections)
Party	Candidate	Votes	%	±%
Labour	I. Grimwood	1,138	68.8	+10.9
Labour	J. Cubbin	1,121	67.8	+9.9
Labour	V. Nice	1,090	65.9	+8.0
Conservative	P. Bartlett	322	19.5	−11.2
Conservative	S. Patten	310	18.8	−11.9
Conservative	P. Steward	308	18.6	−12.1
Alliance	J. Manley	193	11.7	+1.1
Alliance	J. Sanderson	179	10.8	+0.2
Alliance	N. Sanderson	174	10.5	−0.1
Turnout		~1,653	28.6	−2.3
Registered electors		5,780		
Labour hold				
Labour hold				
Labour hold				

=== St Clements ===
St Clements
Party	Candidate	Votes	%	±%
Labour	E. Grant*	1,308	46.8	+5.2
Conservative	M. Morton	1,067	38.2	−3.6
Alliance	K. Prior	419	15.0	−1.6
Majority		241	8.6	N/A
Turnout		2,794	48.3	−1.9
Registered electors		5,785		
Labour hold		Swing	▲4.4	

=== St John's ===
St John's
Party	Candidate	Votes	%	±%
Labour	D. Ball	1,271	51.0	+1.8
Conservative	F. Brown	905	36.3	−5.2
Alliance	A. Howlett	314	12.6	+3.3
Majority		366	14.7	+7.0
Turnout		2,490	41.6	−4.9
Registered electors		5,986		
Labour gain from Conservative		Swing	▲3.5	

=== St Margaret's ===
St Margaret's
Party	Candidate	Votes	%	±%
Conservative	M. Hammond*	1,031	43.2	−12.3
Labour	I. Chevous	695	29.2	−2.3
Alliance	J. Groves	658	27.6	+14.6
Majority		336	14.0	−10.0
Turnout		2,384	41.2	+0.7
Registered electors		5,786		
Conservative hold		Swing	▼5.0	

=== Stoke Park ===
Stoke Park
Party	Candidate	Votes	%	±%
Labour	C. West	1,010	55.7	+10.8
Conservative	C. Body	565	31.1	−4.9
Alliance	M. Redbond	239	13.2	−5.8
Majority		445	24.6	+15.7
Turnout		1,814	30.7	−4.3
Registered electors		5,909		
Labour hold		Swing	▲7.9	

=== Town ===
Town
Party	Candidate	Votes	%	±%
Labour	F. Yule*	1,258	68.0	+5.8
Conservative	K. Thomas	400	21.6	−6.1
Alliance	A. Holden	193	10.4	+0.4
Majority		858	46.4	+11.9
Turnout		1,851	33.7	−3.4
Registered electors		5,493		
Labour hold		Swing	▲6.0	

=== Whitehouse ===
Whitehouse
Party	Candidate	Votes	%	±%
Labour	H. Beales*	1,064	67.1	+5.7
Conservative	R. O'Malley	310	19.5	−9.5
Alliance	E. Beattie	212	13.4	+3.8
Majority		754	47.6	+15.2
Turnout		1,586	29.1	−0.3
Registered electors		5,450		
Labour hold		Swing	▲7.6	

=== Whitton ===
Whitton
Party	Candidate	Votes	%	±%
Labour	P. Gardiner*	1,241	76.7	+10.6
Conservative	S. Fuller	377	23.3	−0.3
Majority		864	53.4	+10.9
Turnout		1,618	29.6	+0.7
Registered electors		5,466		
Labour hold		Swing	▲5.5	
