= 1976 Ipswich Borough Council election =

1976 English local government election

- 6 May 1976

All 47 seats to Ipswich Borough Council 24 seats needed for a majority
	First party	Second party
Party	Conservative	Labour
Last election	11 seats, 37.8%	36 seats, 60.6%
Seats won	26	21
Seat change	▲15	▼15
Popular vote	58,986	50,668
Percentage	52.2%	44.9%
Swing	▲14.4%	▼15.7%
Control before election
Labour
Control after election
Conservative

The 1976 Ipswich Borough Council election was held on 6 May 1976 to elect members to Ipswich Borough Council, which had been established by the Local Government Act 1972 in England and Wales. It took place as part of the 1976 United Kingdom local elections.

There were 14 wards returning between 2 and 5 councillors each. The Conservative Party gained control of the Council from Labour. It took place as part of the 1976 United Kingdom local elections.

== Summary ==
=== Election result ===
1976 Ipswich Borough Council election
Party	Candidates	Seats	Gains	Losses	Net gain/loss	Seats %	Votes %	Votes	+/−
Conservative	47	26	15	0	▲15	55.3	52.2	58,986	+14.4
Labour	47	21	0	15	▼15	44.7	44.9	50,668	–15.7
Liberal	9	0	0	0	Steady	0.0	2.9	3,316	+1.3

== Ward results ==
=== Bixley ===
Bixley (4 seats)
Party	Candidate	Votes	%	±%
Conservative	J. Price	2,102	78.5	+1.4
Conservative	J. Shorten*	2,095	78.3	+1.9
Conservative	A. Seabrook	2,065	77.1	+1.8
Conservative	O. Nunn*	2,032	75.9	+2.1
Labour	P. Allan	547	20.4	−4.4
Labour	J. Hill	512	19.1	−5.4
Labour	F. Phelps	480	17.9	−6.6
Liberal	M. Talbot	445	16.6	N/A
Labour	W. Moszczynski	431	16.1	−7.5
Turnout		~3,094	43.6	+13.8
Registered electors		7,097		
Conservative hold				
Conservative hold				
Conservative hold				
Conservative hold				

=== Bridge ===
Bridge (4 seats)
Party	Candidate	Votes	%	±%
Labour	V. Girling	1,650	54.2	−15.7
Labour	J. Elston	1,532	50.4	−16.9
Labour	M. Sharman*	1,496	49.2	−17.0
Conservative	L. Knights	1,496	49.2	+17.2
Labour	L. Gondris	1,444	47.5	−18.3
Conservative	H. Bestow	1,440	47.3	N/A
Conservative	L. Warnes	1,408	46.3	N/A
Conservative	J. Saguiez	1,316	43.3	N/A
Liberal	G. Smith	386	12.7	N/A
Turnout		3,535	38.3	+13.8
Registered electors		9,231		
Labour hold				
Labour hold				
Labour hold				
Conservative gain from Labour				

=== Broom Hill ===
Broom Hill (3 seats)
Party	Candidate	Votes	%	±%
Conservative	D. Myer*	1,372	72.6	+3.8
Conservative	A. Rampling*	1,301	68.9	+6.4
Conservative	S. Manthorpe	1,154	61.1	−1.1
Labour	J. North	542	28.7	−8.6
Labour	D. Watkins	469	24.8	−10.3
Labour	K. Selway	455	24.1	−10.1
Liberal	M. Reckitt	375	19.8	N/A
Turnout		2,288	47.3	+17.1
Registered electors		4,837		
Conservative hold				
Conservative hold				
Conservative hold				

=== Chantry ===
Chantry (5 seats)
Party	Candidate	Votes	%	±%
Labour	D. Grimwood	1,776	65.0	−6.8
Labour	A. Smith*	1,715	62.8	−8.5
Labour	K. Cartwright	1,714	62.8	−7.9
Labour	J. Cann	1,691	61.9	−7.5
Labour	D. Eaton*	1,663	60.9	−7.2
Conservative	G. Dalby	1,041	38.1	+13.2
Conservative	D. Cooper	984	36.0	+12.3
Conservative	N. Lee-Frampton	947	34.7	N/A
Conservative	E. Schur	905	33.1	N/A
Conservative	S. Lowman	885	32.4	N/A
Liberal	K. Ball	336	12.3	N/A
Turnout		~3,156	28.8	+8.2
Registered electors		10,959		
Labour hold				
Labour hold				
Labour hold				
Labour hold				
Labour hold				

=== Gainsborough ===
Gainsborough (3 seats)
Party	Candidate	Votes	%	±%
Labour	M. Mickleburgh*	1,338	67.7	−2.6
Labour	R. Skerritt*	1,206	61.1	−7.7
Labour	P. Thurlow	1,182	59.8	−6.5
Conservative	J. Young	634	32.1	+6.8
Conservative	M. Grant	490	24.8	N/A
Conservative	C. Green	428	21.7	N/A
Turnout		~1,975	34.7	+9.9
Registered electors		5,691		
Labour hold				
Labour hold				
Labour hold				

=== Middle ===
Middle (2 seats)
Party	Candidate	Votes	%	±%
Conservative	O. Cook	694	45.9	+7.8
Labour	J. Beeston	637	42.2	−5.6
Labour	J. Metcalfe	630	41.7	−4.9
Conservative	B. Paternoster	577	38.2	+1.7
Liberal	M. Hale	179	11.8	−3.9
Turnout		~1,511	41.5	+3.2
Registered electors		3,641		
Conservative gain from Labour				
Labour hold				

=== Racecourse ===
Racecourse (3 seats)
Party	Candidate	Votes	%	±%
Labour	B. James*	942	55.6	−18.7
Labour	R. Elliott*	918	54.2	−16.0
Labour	P. Ross	850	50.2	−19.0
Conservative	M. Francis	550	32.5	+9.8
Conservative	M. Nunn	498	29.4	N/A
Conservative	N. Cooke-Abbott	461	27.2	N/A
Liberal	R. Holt	201	11.9	N/A
Turnout		~1,693	33.7	+8.5
Registered electors		5,023		
Labour hold				
Labour hold				
Labour hold				

=== Rushmere ===
Rushmere (3 seats)
Party	Candidate	Votes	%	±%
Conservative	M. Keeble*	1,848	51.9	+6.4
Conservative	W. Pipe	1,826	51.3	+6.2
Conservative	R. Strutt	1,770	49.7	+5.4
Labour	J. Wright*	1,166	32.7	−12.6
Labour	C. Rawlinson*	1,145	32.1	−13.1
Labour	I. Grimwood	1,140	32.0	−12.1
Liberal	J. Kippax	546	15.3	−1.3
Turnout		~3,562	57.6	+8.5
Registered electors		6,184		
Conservative hold				
Conservative gain from Labour				
Conservative gain from Labour				

=== St Clements ===
St Clements (3 seats)
Party	Candidate	Votes	%	±%
Conservative	J. Cooper	1,405	55.6	+6.0
Conservative	J. Driver	1,369	54.2	+5.3
Conservative	S. Brand	1,343	53.1	+5.5
Labour	E. Grant*	1,122	44.4	−7.7
Labour	C. James	1,002	39.6	−11.9
Labour	A. White	959	37.9	−12.5
Turnout		~2,528	49.2	+7.5
Registered electors		5,138		
Conservative gain from Labour				
Conservative gain from Labour				
Conservative gain from Labour				

=== St John's ===
St John's (3 seats)
Party	Candidate	Votes	%	±%
Labour	J. Mowles	1,305	46.1	−15.6
Conservative	W. Hammond	1,220	43.1	+7.7
Conservative	F. Brown	1,216	42.9	+7.9
Conservative	A. Gorham	1,203	42.5	+7.9
Labour	D. Warsop*	1,099	38.8	−22.6
Labour	B. O'Reilly*	1,089	38.5	−22.1
Liberal	K. Heales	307	10.8	N/A
Turnout		~2,832	55.6	+12.3
Registered electors		5,094		
Labour hold				
Conservative gain from Labour				
Conservative gain from Labour				

=== St Margarets ===
St Margarets (3 seats)
Party	Candidate	Votes	%	±%
Conservative	H. Davies*	1,991	80.5	+9.9
Conservative	D. Marrlott*	1,955	79.0	+9.9
Conservative	M. Macdonald*	1,924	77.8	+9.5
Labour	P. Gondris	482	19.5	−3.5
Labour	K. Wilson	467	18.9	−3.7
Labour	K. Wilson	438	17.7	−3.9
Turnout		~2,474	40.1	+5.8
Registered electors		6,170		
Conservative hold				
Conservative hold				
Conservative hold				

=== Valley ===
Valley (3 seats)
Party	Candidate	Votes	%	±%
Conservative	A. Barker	987	52.6	+6.7
Conservative	P. Claxton	974	51.9	+6.3
Conservative	B. Pinner	958	51.0	+6.7
Labour	L. Edwards	888	47.3	−2.6
Labour	R. Kirby	820	43.7	−5.3
Labour	I. Andrews	812	43.3	−5.4
Turnout		~1,877	45.0	+8.6
Registered electors		4,171		
Conservative gain from Labour				
Conservative gain from Labour				
Conservative gain from Labour				

=== Westbourne ===
Westbourne (3 seats)
Party	Candidate	Votes	%	±%
Labour	S. Mason*	1,204	57.6	−9.6
Labour	C. Packard*	1,169	55.9	−10.2
Labour	H. Beales	1,107	53.0	−10.3
Conservative	J. Mudd	884	42.3	+14.5
Conservative	R. Mudd	852	40.8	+14.1
Conservative	D. Rees	825	39.5	+13.1
Turnout		~2,090	35.3	+8.0
Registered electors		5,920		
Labour hold				
Labour hold				
Labour hold				

=== Whitton ===
Whitton (5 seats)
Party	Candidate	Votes	%	±%
Labour	W. Knowles*	1,545	42.6	−25.6
Conservative	K. Clark	1,540	42.5	+9.8
Conservative	D. Thomas	1,536	42.4	+10.5
Conservative	D. Scotcher	1,530	42.2	N/A
Labour	D. Rowland*	1,523	42.0	−22.8
Conservative	D. Baldwin	1,512	41.7	N/A
Labour	F. Wilding	1,499	41.4	−22.8
Labour	J. Watkins	1,477	40.8	−22.8
Conservative	D. Hamilton-Lowe	1,443	39.8	N/A
Labour	D. North*	1,390	38.4	−24.8
Liberal	R. Whiting	541	14.9	N/A
Turnout		~3,624	36.9	+10.7
Registered electors		9,821		
Labour hold				
Conservative gain from Labour				
Conservative gain from Labour				
Conservative gain from Labour				
Labour hold				
