= List of schools in Slough =

This is a list of schools in Slough in the English county of Berkshire.

== State-funded schools ==
=== Primary schools ===
- Castleview Primary School
- The Cippenham School
- Claycots School
- Colnbrook CE Primary School
- Foxborough Primary School
- The Godolphin Junior Academy
- Grove Academy
- Holy Family RC Primary School
- Iqra Slough Islamic Primary School
- James Elliman Academy
- Khalsa Primary School
- The Langley Academy Primary
- Langley Hall Primary Academy
- The Langley Heritage Primary
- Lynch Hill School Primary Academy
- Marish Primary School
- Montem Academy
- Our Lady of Peace RC Primary School
- Penn Wood Primary School
- Phoenix Infant Academy
- Pippins School
- Priory School
- Ryvers School
- St Anthony's RC Primary School
- St Ethelbert's RC Primary School
- St Mary's CE Primary School
- Western House Academy
- Wexham Court Primary School
- Willow Primary School

=== Non-selective secondary schools ===
- Baylis Court School
- Beechwood School
- Ditton Park Academy
- Eden Girls' School
- Grove Academy
- Langley Academy
- Lynch Hill Enterprise Academy
- St Joseph's Catholic High School
- Slough and Eton Church of England Business and Enterprise College
- The Westgate School
- Wexham School

=== Grammar schools ===
- Herschel Grammar School
- Langley Grammar School
- St Bernard's Catholic Grammar School
- Upton Court Grammar School

=== Special and alternative schools ===
- Arbour Vale School
- Haybrook College
- Littledown School

=== Further education ===
- East Berkshire College

== Independent schools ==
=== Primary and preparatory schools ===
- Islamic Shakhsiyah Foundation
- St Bernard's Preparatory School

=== Senior and all-through schools ===
- Langley Hall Arts Academy
- Long Close School

=== Special and alternative schools ===
- Darul Madinah
