= Beechwood =

Beechwood may refer to:

== Plants ==
- Beech wood, the wood from any of ten species of beech trees
- Malay beechwood, tree Gmelina arborea, and its wood
- Willow beechwood Faurea saligna, and its wood

== Places ==
=== Canada ===
- Beechwood, Ontario

=== United Kingdom ===
- Beechwood, Runcorn, Cheshire, England
- Beechwood, Merseyside, England
  - Beechwood railway station
- Beechwood, Middlesbrough, North Yorkshire, England
- Beechwood, Leeds, a location in England
- Beechwood, Solihull, West Midlands, a settlement in Berkswell parish
- Beechwood, Highland, a location in Scotland
- Beechwood, Newport, Wales

=== United States ===
- Beechwood, Indiana
- Beechwood, Michigan, in Ottawa County
- Beechwood, Iron County, Michigan
- Beechwood, Mississippi
- Beachwood, Ohio, formerly Beechwood
- Beechwood, Wood County, West Virginia
- Beechwood, Wyoming County, West Virginia
- Beechwood, Wisconsin

== Buildings ==
=== United States ===
- Beechwood (Astor mansion), Newport, Rhode Island
- Beechwood (Isaac Kinsey House), Washington Township, Indiana
- Beechwood (Southbridge, Massachusetts)
- Beechwood (Vanderlip mansion), Briarcliff Manor, New York
- Harewood and Beechwood, two historic homes in Middletown Township, Bucks County, Pennsylvania
- Beechwood (Beales, Virginia)
- Beechwood Hall, in Franklin, Tennessee

=== United Kingdom ===
- Beechwood House (disambiguation), several houses

== Schools ==
- Beechwood School, in Slough, England
- Beechwood School, Royal Tunbridge Wells, England
- Beechwood Elementary School, in Pittsburgh, Pennsylvania, U.S.
- Beechwood High School, in Fort Mitchell, Kentucky, U.S.

== Other uses ==
- Beechwood children's home, in Mapperley, Nottinghamshire, England
- Beechwood Luas stop, in Dublin, Ireland

== See also ==
- Beachwood (disambiguation)
- Beechwood Park (disambiguation)
- Beechwood Cemetery (disambiguation)
- "Beechwood 4-5789", a 1962 song by The Marvelettes, covered by The Carpenters in 1982
- Beechwoods, a nature reserve near Cambridge, England
