= Beechwood, West Virginia =

Beechwood, West Virginia may refer to:

- Beechwood, Wood County, West Virginia, an unincorporated community
- Beechwood, Wyoming County, West Virginia, an unincorporated community
