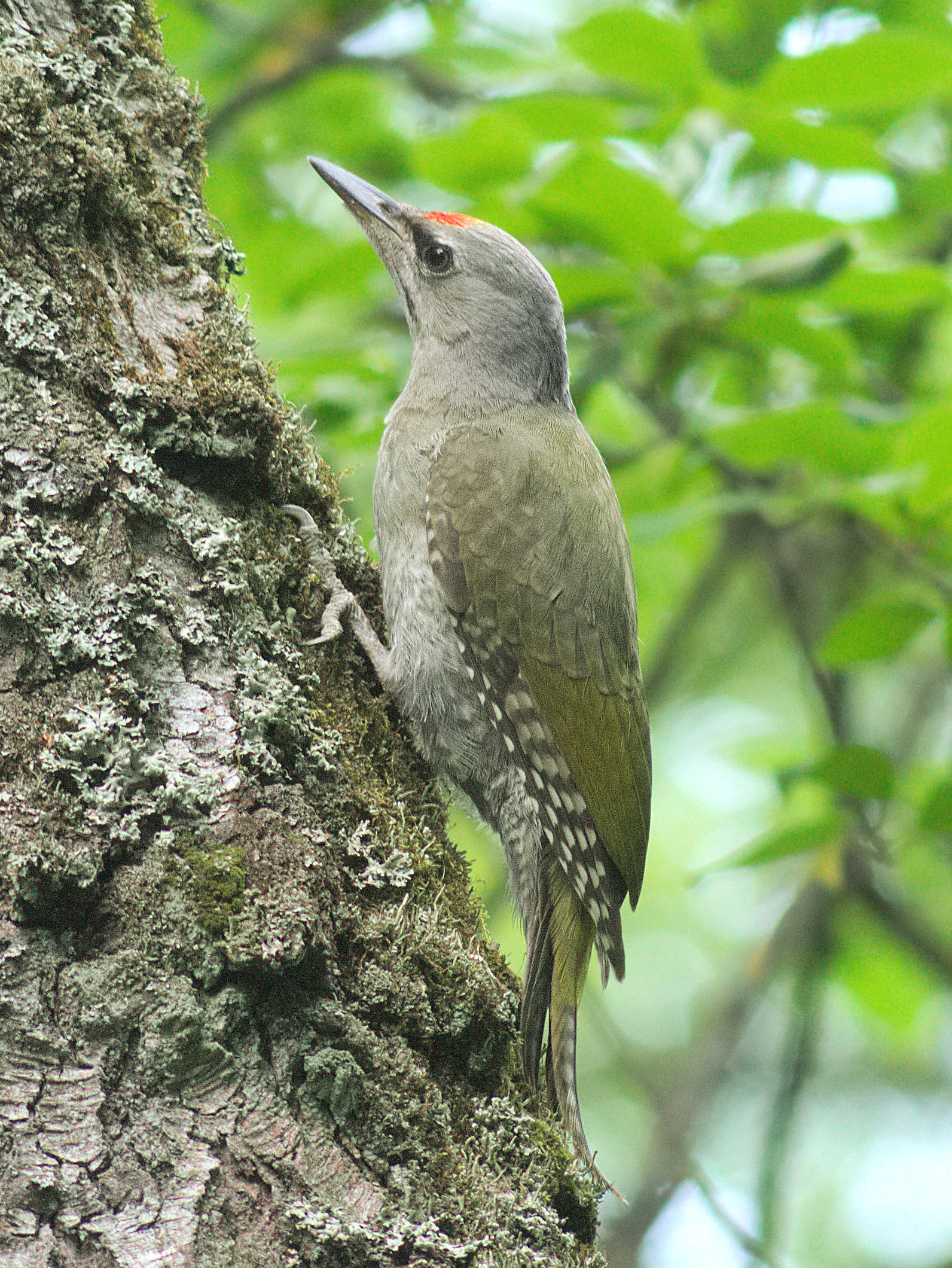
- Picus canus canus, male, Moscow, Russia
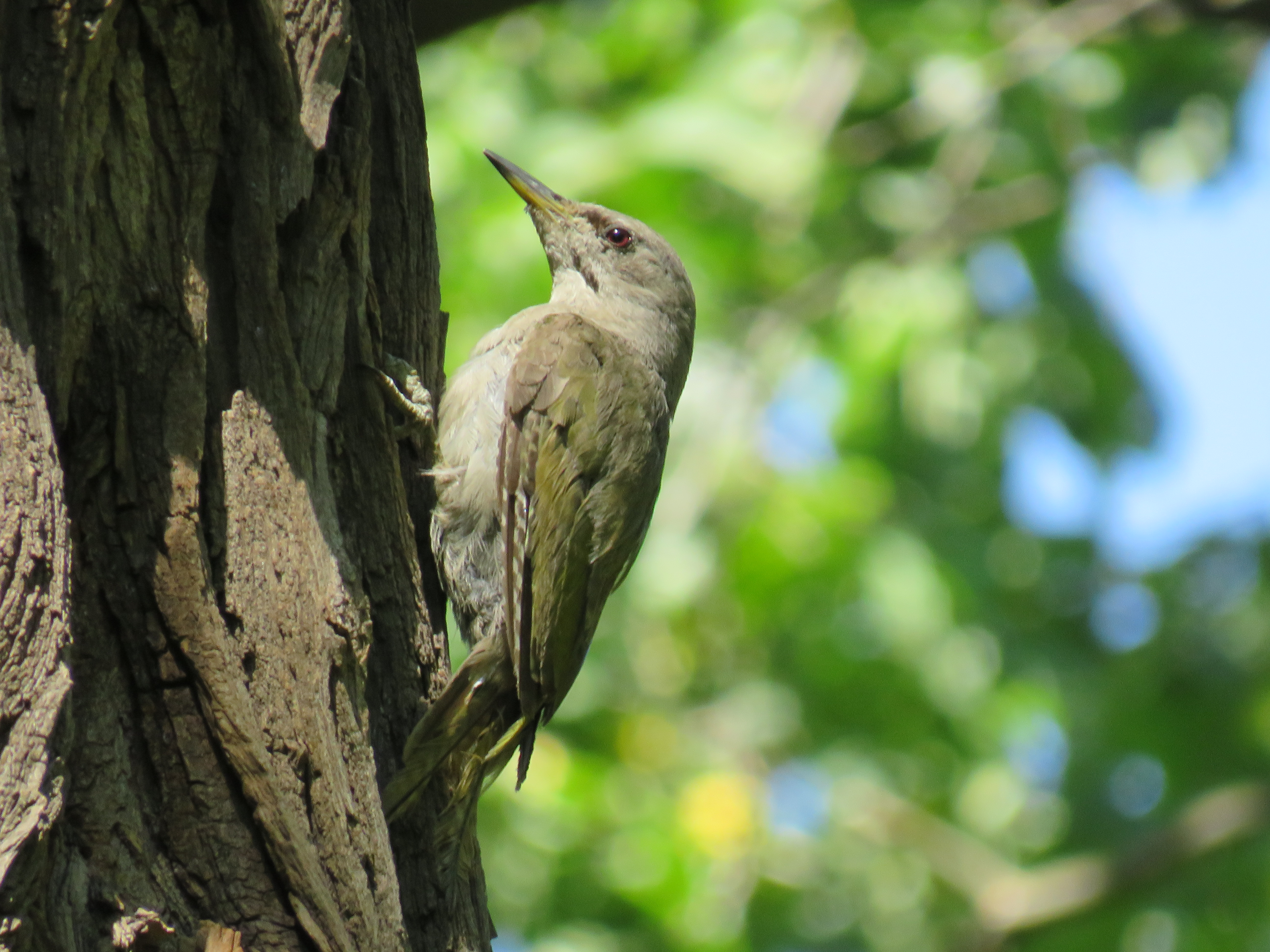
- Picus canus canus, female, Dnipro, Ukraine

Conservation status
- Least Concern (IUCN 3.1)

Scientific classification
- Kingdom: Animalia
- Phylum: Chordata
- Class: Aves
- Order: Piciformes
- Family: Picidae
- Genus: Picus
- Species: P. canus

Binomial name
- Picus canus Gmelin, JF, 1788
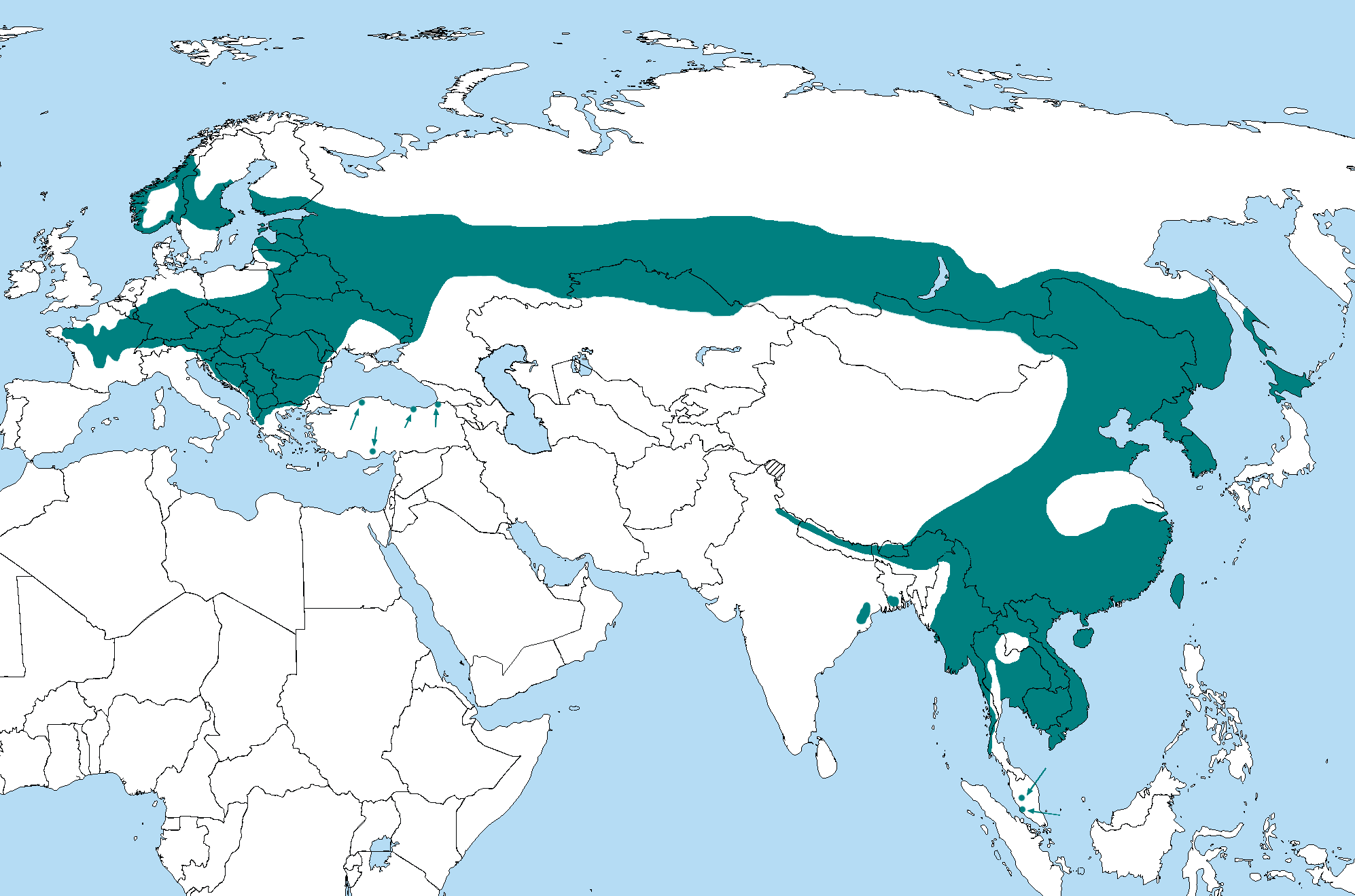
- Distribution

= Grey-headed woodpecker =

Species of bird

The grey-headed woodpecker (Picus canus), also known as the grey-faced woodpecker, is a Eurasian member of the woodpecker family, Picidae. Along with the more commonly found European green woodpecker and the Iberian green woodpecker, it is one of three closely related species found in Europe. Its distribution also stretches across large parts of the central and Eastern Palaearctic, all the way to the Pacific Ocean and south to the Himalaya and the Malay Peninsula.

The grey-headed woodpecker is more demanding than the European green woodpecker in terms of its habitat. It prefers deciduous forest with a high proportion of dead trees, feeding primarily on ants, although not being as exclusively dependent on this group as the green woodpecker. The grey-headed woodpecker's nest is typically excavated into dead or severely damaged trees.

In the majority of areas for which population numbers are available, the grey-headed woodpecker is in decline. IUCN's Least Concern rating is primarily based on the large distribution of the species.

== Taxonomy ==
The grey-headed woodpecker was formally described by the German naturalist Johann Friedrich Gmelin in 1788 in the 13th edition of the Systema Naturae under the current binomial name Picus canus. The specific epithet canus is Latin for "grey". Gmelin based his description on the "grey-headed green woodpecker" that had been described and illustrated in 1747 by the English naturalist George Edwards. Edwards' specimen had come from Norway.

Eleven subspecies are recognised; they divide into two groups, a northern group of two subspecies where the nape is grey, and a southeastern group of nine where the nape is black.

Grey-naped subspecies

- P. c. canus Gmelin, JF, 1788 – north and central Europe to west Siberia
- P. c. jessoensis Stejneger, 1886 – east Siberia to northeast China, Korea and north Japan (includes P. c. griseoviridis)

Black-naped subspecies

- P. c. kogo (Bianchi, 1906) – central China
- P. c. guerini (Malherbe, 1849) – north central and east central China
- P. c. sobrinus Peters, JL, 1948 – southeast China and northeast Vietnam
- P. c. tancolo (Gould, 1863) – Hainan Island (off southeast China) and Taiwan
- P. c. sordidior (Rippon, G, 1906) – southeast Tibet and southwest China to northeast Myanmar
- P. c. sanguiniceps Baker, ECS, 1926 – northeast Pakistan to north India and west Nepal
- P. c. hessei Gyldenstolpe, 1916 – Nepal and northeast India to Myanmar and Indochina
- P. c. robinsoni (Ogilvie-Grant, 1906) – west Malaysia
- P. c. dedemi (van Oort, ED, 1911) – highlands of Sumatra

The subspecies P. c. dedemi has sometimes been treated as a separate species, the Sumatran woodpecker.

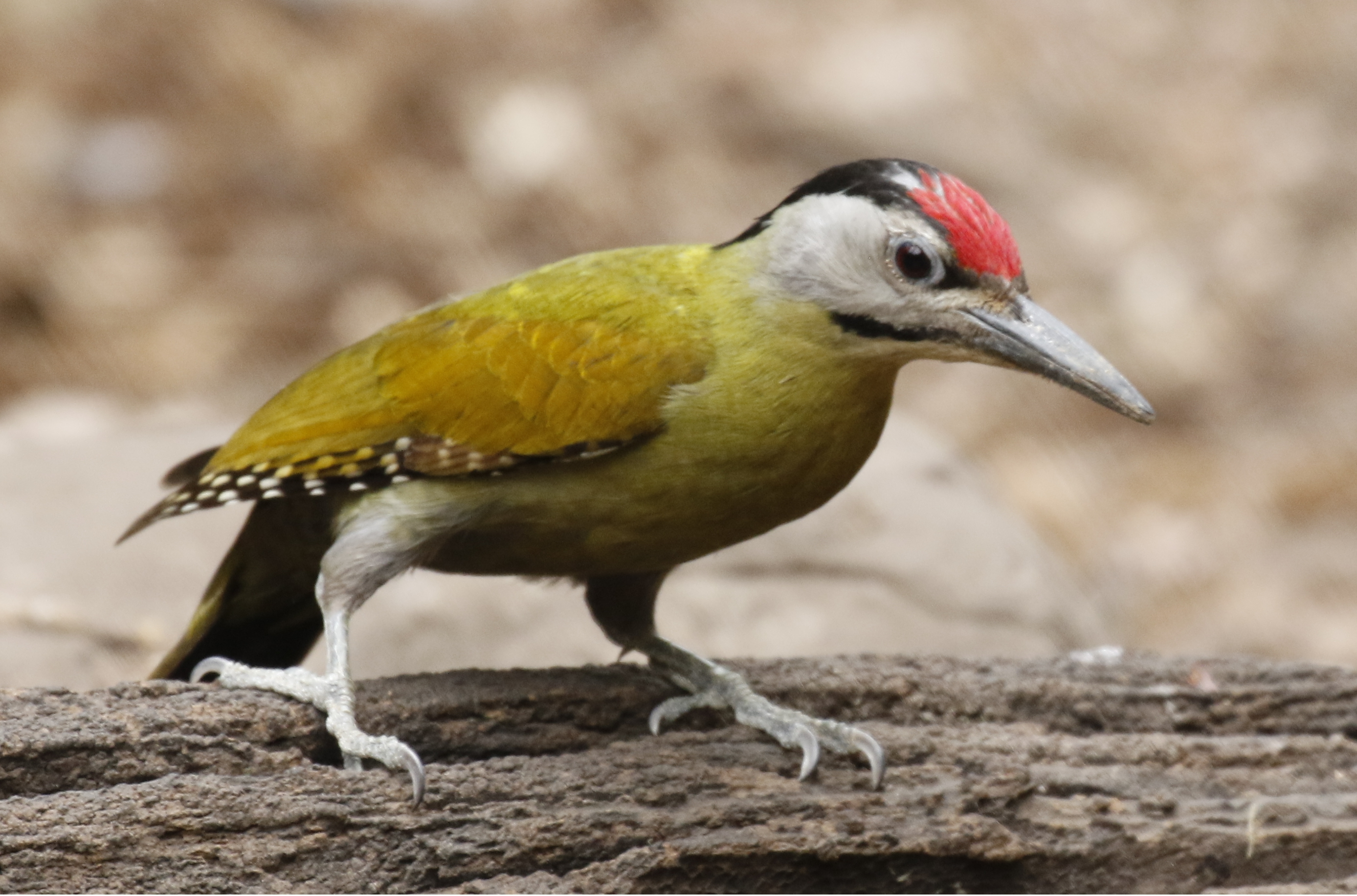
The subspecies Picus canus hessei has a black nape. Male in Kaeng Krachan National Park, Thailand

The nine subspecies with a black nape are treated as a separate species black-naped woodpecker (Picus guerini) by some authorities, including the IUCN; as a group, they occur in the southeast of the range, from central China south to the Malay Peninsula and southwest to the Himalaya. As well as having a black nape, they are also darker green to brownish-green on the wings than the two grey naped northern subspecies.

There is evidence for hybridisation between grey-headed and European green woodpeckers. However, these seem extremely rare. It appears that the female partner was invariably a grey-headed woodpecker. Nothing has been reported concerning the fertility of such hybrid offspring. Their plumage more closely resembles grey-headed woodpeckers, but with a red parting on the head, a reddish nape and a brighter iris, while some were conspicuous for their darker colour.

== Description ==
The grey-headed woodpecker is 25–26 cm (9.8–10.2 in) in length, has a wingspan of 38–40 cm (15–16 in) and weighs around 125 g (4.4 oz). The male of the nominate subspecies has a grey head with a red forecrown. There is a black line across the lores and a narrow black moustache stripe. The back, scapulars and wing coverts are green. The breast and underbody are pale grey. The folded primaries are barred brown-black on grey-white. The female lacks the red forecrown but has fine black streaks on the crown. The widely distributed Picus canus jessoensis is very similar to the nominate subspecies but is slightly greyer and less green. The Chinese subspecies Picus canus guerini has a black nape patch and a greenish underbody. The subspecies Picus canus hessei is similar to P. c. guerini but is more golden green above and a deeper green below. Specimens of the more widespread of the two Eastern subspecies, P. c. jessoensis, are usually a little larger and heavier than individuals from the type locality. On average, it is somewhat smaller and lighter than the European green woodpecker. In the field, this distinction in size is difficult to make. Its size is approximately that of a Eurasian collared dove. The subspecies dedemi is very distinctive in appearance. The male has brownish red upperparts, a bright red rump and a black tail.

Grey-headed woodpeckers have uniformly olive green upperparts, transitioning across the neck to a light grey, the head being that latter colour. The typical woodpecker markings are small and not particularly conspicuous. It has a grey head with black moustache, and the male has a red crown. It has a shorter neck, slimmer bill and slightly rounder head than the green woodpecker.

=== Sounds ===
Picus canus canus, call

Calls made by the European green woodpecker and grey-headed woodpecker resemble each other. The far-carrying territorial song of the grey-headed woodpecker is more melodic and cleaner than the explosive "laughter" of the green woodpecker. The call series consists of ten to fifteen utterances of declining pitch and gradual slowing. The verse may appear melancholic and "dying". The territorial song of females is similar, but somewhat quieter, less melodious, but more croaky and often shorter.

Besides these partner-specific vocalisations, aggressive noises can be heard from both sexes, but more often the male. Typical are individual, sharp kuek sounds that may, with increasing irritation, be placed in sequence and be continued as kek. A single kuek may also be a predator warning, as begging nestlings will immediately fall silent if this call is made by either parent. Individual drumming activity by grey-headed woodpeckers can be quite varied, but they drum on more occasions than European green woodpeckers. Drumming frequence can be 20 Hertz, with a "drum roll" lasting up to 40 beats, or two seconds. Both sexes drum, but the female less often than the male, and usually more quietly and shorter. Grey-headed woodpeckers often continue to use the same well-resonating drum sites for years – these can even be at a considerable distance from the nest. Grey-headed woodpeckers often use metal covers on masts and roofs as drumming substrate due to their favourable resonance characteristics.

== Distribution and habitat ==
The grey-headed woodpecker is found in wide parts of central, northern and eastern Europe, as well as a wide belt south of the boreal coniferous forests across Asia all the way to the Pacific coast, Sakhalin and Hokkaidō. Its northern limit is at the border between closed coniferous and mixed forest; the southern limit is where tree steppe transitions to treeless shrubby steppe. In East Asia, the species is most differentiated, and south of Manchuria covers the Korean Peninsula, as well as large parts of eastern China, the Himalaya, and the mountain forests of the Malay Peninsula.

In Europe, the nominate subspecies breeds within a wide belt from western France to the Urals. It has settled medium latitudes of Scandinavia as well as central, eastern and southern Europe. In Italy, it is confined to the northernmost areas. There is contradictory information regarding its occurrence in Turkey. Most likely, several hundred pairs breed in Mittelgebirge habitats of the Pontic Mountains. The species is absent from the North German Plain, British Isles, Iberian Peninsula, and Mediterranean islands.

== Behaviour and ecology ==
=== Breeding ===
Grey-headed woodpeckers breed in May and lay five to ten eggs which are brought up by both parents. The young hatch after 15–17 days, and fledge in 24–25 days.

=== Food and feeding ===
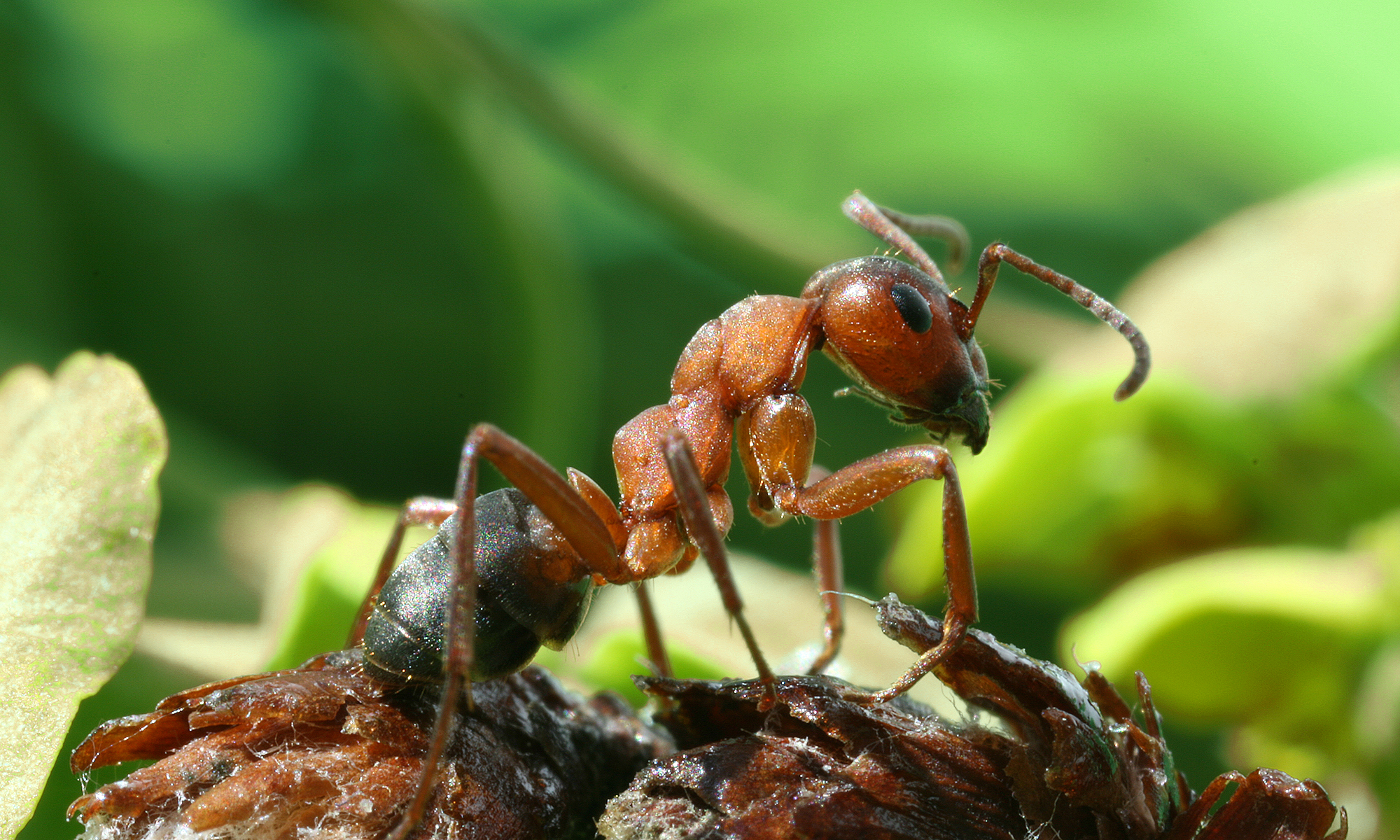
Formica rufa is one of the species eaten

The grey-headed woodpecker is a somewhat less specialised ant hunter than the European green woodpecker. In its foraging strategy it is intermediate between many Dendrocopos species on the one hand, and the often ant-specific members of the genus Picus. This reduced ant specialisation of the grey-headed woodpecker allows it to be sympatric with European green woodpeckers and even to breed at about 100 metres from them.

Nonetheless, ants and their immatures make up the great bulk of the grey-headed woodpecker's diet, particularly in spring and summer. Wood ants of the genus Formica as well as members of Lasius and Myrmicinae such as Myrmica spp. predominate, and with termites, may make up 90% of the diet. Besides those, caterpillars, crickets, bark and wood beetle larvae, flies, spiders and lice are part of the diet. In late autumn and early winter, grey-headed woodpeckers switch to including significant amounts of vegetable matter, such as berries and other fruit, in their diets on a regular basis.

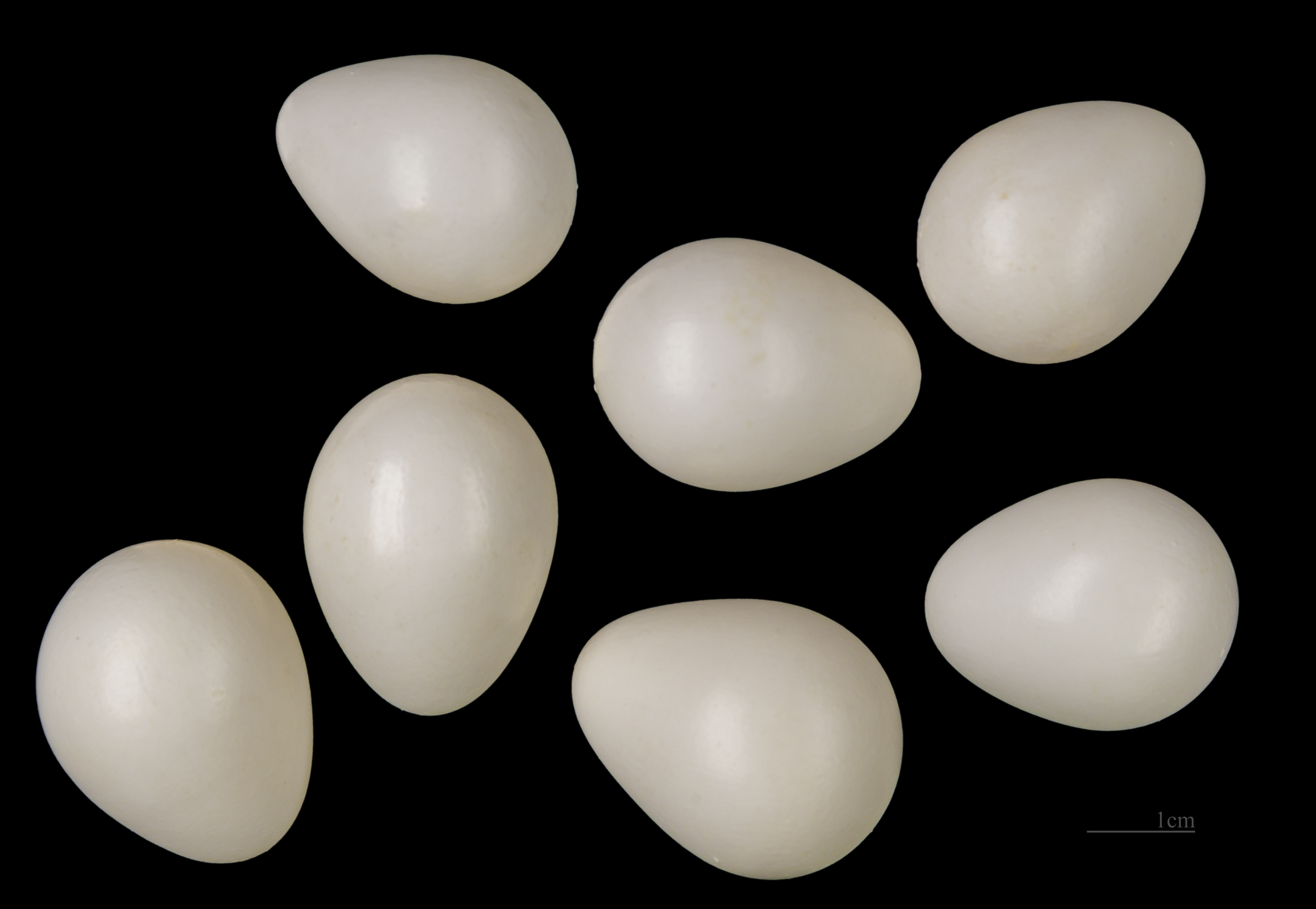
Eggs of Picus canus

== Conservation status ==
The grey-headed woodpecker is difficult to record, as isolated breeding pairs rarely call much. These are therefore easily overlooked, and population records have corresponding gaps. It is probable that European populations, especially at the north-western margin of the range, have receded in numbers and distribution. Since the 1990s, populations seem to be recovering as a result of mild winters. Globally, there is a slight reduction in population numbers, but insufficiently so for an elevated threat status. The species is therefore considered safe.

The observation of stable or slightly increasing populations in Europe may, however, be based solely on greater effort in recording the species. The overall European population is estimated at 180,000 to 320,000 breeding pairs. Key populations are found in European parts of Russia as well as Romania. Germany has around 15,000 pairs, Austria approximately 2,500 and Switzerland about 1,500. There are no summary figures for populations outside Europe.

As the grey-headed woodpecker prefers undisturbed and ancient forests with natural cohort structure as well as riparian forests for breeding, the destruction of such habitat is the greatest threat to the species.

== Sources ==
- Cramp, Stanley, ed. (1985). "Picus canus Grey-headed woodpecker". Handbook of the Birds of Europe the Middle East and North Africa. The Birds of the Western Palearctic. Vol. IV: Terns to Woodpeckers. Oxford: Oxford University Press. pp. 813–824. ISBN 978-0-19-857507-8.
- Gorman, Gerard (2004). Woodpeckers of Europe. A Study to European Picidae. Chalfont St Peter, Buckinghamshire, UK: Bruce Coleman Books. pp. 35, 44, 57–68. ISBN 1-872842-05-4.
