= Ravi Singh (humanitarian) =

British humanitarian (born 1969)

Ravinder Singh
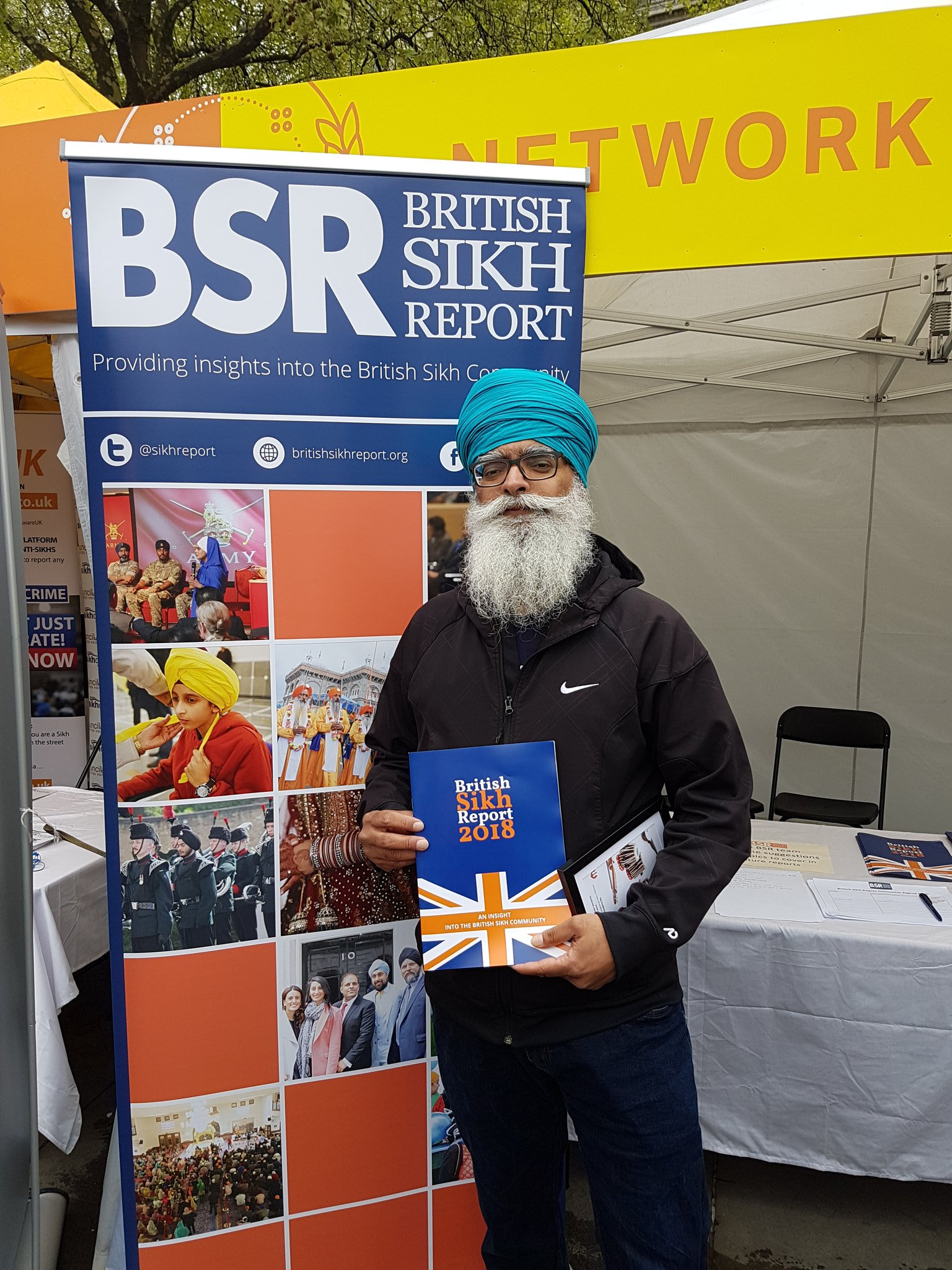
- Born: September 16, 1969 (age 57); Mundian Jattan, Hoshiarpur, Punjab, India
- Education: Slough and Eton Church of England Business and Enterprise College
- Occupation: CEO of Khalsa Aid
- Years active: 1999-Present
- Known for: Humanitarian work around the globe, Promoting sikhism
- Notable work: Founded Khalsa Aid 1999; Humanitarian Aid to Yazdi Families in Iraq escaped from ISIS
- Board member of: Khalsa Aid
- Awards: Sikh of the Year 2014; Bhagat Singh Thind community empowerment Award 2017; Darpan Award 2017

Ravinder "Ravi" Singh (born 16 September 1969) is a British humanitarian and founder and CEO of the Sikh international non-profit aid and relief organization Khalsa Aid.

== Career ==
Ravi has been working as a Sikh humanitarian since 1999, when he had the idea of taking the ideals of the Khalsa to regions of the world that needed it the most with the hope that it will help to rekindle people’s trust in humanity.

Ravi shot to fame in the UK in 2014 when he mobilized his charity to help the people of Somerset after heavy rain and high winds caused huge amounts of damage to property and land. Later that year the people of Somerset nominated him to appear on the national hit TV show 'Surprise Surprise' as a way of saying thank you for his support. He received a family holiday and a new car.

In 2015 Ravi helped the people of Nepal after an earthquake killed nearly 9,000 people and injured nearly 25,000. He encouraged his newly made friends from Somerset to help.

The BBC made a film about Ravi in 2016 titled 'The Selfless Sikh' which documented his journey to northern Iraq, where he provides aid to Yazidi families who have fled their homes to escape the brutality of Islamic State. The film follows Singh into the heart of Iraqi Kurdistan as he delivers aid to Yazidi refugees in makeshift camps, barely 70 kilometres from the IS stronghold of Mosul.

In 2016 Ravi's team assisted motorists stranded in the Dover traffic chaos by delivering 6000 water bottles. Some travelers spent up to 15 hours at a standstill on the M20. Ravi was praised widely on social media. Ravi Singh also stepped in to provide relief to flood victims in multiple Indian states impacted in the 2019 Indian floods.

== Awards and recognition ==
Sep 2018: Received 'The Award Of Excellence and Achievement' by the Punjabi Society Of British Isles at a ceremony in the British Parliament.

May 2018: He refused the ‘Indian of the Year’ Award nomination for his humanitarian contributions because he does not identify himself as an Indian but as a Punjabi/Khalsa.

Dec 2017: Honoured with the Bhagat Singh Thind Community Empowerment Award at a national gala dinner in Maryland USA.

Sep 2017: Received the 'International Sensation Award' at Darpan Awards ceremony in Surrey, Canada.

Dec 2014: Awarded 'Sikh of the Year 2014' at an award ceremony in Amritsar.

== See also ==
- List of British Sikhs
