= Beechwood Park =

Beechwood Park may refer to:

== Places ==
- Beechwood Park, Newport, a park in Newport, Wales
- Beechwood Park, Nova Scotia, a suburb of Halifax, Nova Scotia, Canada
- Beechwood Park (mansion), a building near Markyate, Hertfordshire, England, now housing Beechwood Park School
  - RAF Beechwood Park, a Royal Air Force Satellite Landing Ground

== Football grounds in Scotland ==
- Beechwood Park, Auchinleck, home of Auchinleck Talbot F.C.
- Beechwood Park, Dundee, home of Lochee Harp F.C. until 2017
- Beechwood Park, Glasgow, home of Thistle F.C. (1884–1892) then Strathclyde F.C. (1894–1919)
- Beechwood Park, Leith, Edinburgh, home of Leith Athletic

== Other uses ==
- "Beechwood Park", a song by the Zombies from the 1968 album Odessey and Oracle

== See also ==
- Beechwood (disambiguation)
