= Beachwood =

Beachwood may refer to:

== Places in the United States ==
- Beachwood, New Jersey, a borough
- Beachwood, Ohio, a city

== Other uses ==
- Beachwood City Schools, a public school system in Beachwood, Ohio, United States
- Beachwood High School, Beachwood, Ohio

== See also ==
- Beachwood Canyon, Los Angeles, a community in California, United States
- Beachwood Place, a mall in Beachwood, Ohio, United States
- The Beachwood Reporter, a Chicago-based Web publication
- Beechwood (disambiguation)
