= City Academy Norwich =

Public secondary school in Norwich, England

Location
- 299 Bluebell Road; Norwich, Norfolk, NR4 7LP; England; 52.6266°N 1.2463°E

Information
- Type: Single Academy Trust
- Trust: Supported by Sapientia Education Trust
- Department for Education URN: 135904 Tables
- Ofsted: Reports
- Chair of Governors (acting): Nicholas Vitkovitch
- Headteacher (interim): Joanna Franklin
- Gender: Mixed
- Age: 11 to 16
- Enrolment: 668 pupils
- Houses: Griffins, Phoenix, Titans
- Website: https://canorwich.org

City Academy Norwich is a secondary school in Norwich, England. It opened in September 2009, replacing Earlham High School. It is located near the University of East Anglia in Norwich. The academy, an 11-16 school, is a Single Academy trust, and working in support with Bohunt Education Trust.

== History ==
Earlham High School was a community comprehensive for boys and girls aged 12 to 18, with a specialism in sports. In 2008 it was one of the worst-performing secondary schools in England.

The school was made an academy and recruited a new principal, David Brunton, formerly head at Wymondham High School. Within three years, there were marked improvements in attendance and behaviour, and the City Academy reached the top 1% in the whole country for its value-added score.

Work began on an £18million new build in January 2011, and it was opened in May 2012. The new building was designed by Sheppard Robson Architects and Ramboll structural engineers and built by Kier Eastern. It includes radio and television studios and music rehearsal rooms.

Mary Sparrow, formerly headteacher of Wexham School in Slough, succeeded David Brunton as principal in January 2015.

== Philosophy ==
The school's philosophy includes "stage not age", i.e. pupils are able to study subjects and take exams when they are ready for them rather than at a set age. As an academy, the school day was extended from ending at 3 p.m. to 3.40. This enabled them to condense Key Stage 3 from 3 years study to 2, allowing up to 3 years for GCSE studies.

The new building features "anti-bullying toilets" which open directly onto corridors and are used by boys, girls and staff.

Other experimental policies include allowing the use of mobile phones as an aid to learning in the classroom.
