= Steve Rhodes (journalist) =

Steve Rhodes is a Chicago journalist and the founder and editor of The Beachwood Reporter, a Chicago-centric webzine that launched in February 2006.

Before starting the Reporter, Rhodes was a reporter for Chicago magazine and wrote "Press Box", a media column on the magazine's Web site. Before that, he worked for Newsweek and the Chicago Tribune.

Rhodes's duties include shaping and editing the site's content, as well as writing "The Papers", a media-criticism column that runs weekdays on the site's main page.
