= Herschel Grammar School =

Coordinates: 51.5188°N 0.6115°W

Herschel School

Location
- Northampton Avenue; Slough, Berkshire, SL1 3BW; England

Information
- Type: Grammar academy
- Motto: Responsibility, success, care
- Established: 1952
- Department for Education URN: 137726 Tables
- Ofsted: Reports
- Head teacher: Joanne Rockall
- Gender: Co-educational
- Age: 11 to 18
- Enrolment: 900
- Website: http://www.herschel.slough.sch.uk/

Herschel Grammar School is a co-educational grammar school with academy status, located in Slough, Berkshire, England. The headteacher is Mrs Joanne Rockall. The school has around 900 pupils, 250 of whom are in the sixth form. The school starts from Y7 and ends at Y13 (Sixth Form)

== History ==
The school was established in town centre buildings formerly occupied by Slough Secondary School in William Street (a site later occupied by the Slough campus of Thames Valley University) in about 1952. In 1958, the school moved to a purpose-built site on Northampton Avenue, occupying land that had (before the Second World War) been used as 'Timbertown', an area of temporary houses. The school has remained at Northampton Avenue, although for the 1988/89 academic year it temporarily moved to the site of the former Orchard Secondary Modern School while the permanent buildings were refurbished after damage to the roof in the storms of 1987.

Within its present buildings, the school has had a number of names and forms, including:

Slough Technical School
Slough Technical High School (to 1972)
Herschel High School (1972 to 1984)
Sir William Herschel Grammar School (from 1984)
Herschel Grammar School

In 2004, the school completed a sports centre, which now serves as Herschel Sports to the public when out of school hours. The sports complex includes a full-size astro-turf football, hockey pitch, four full-size tennis courts, six full-size indoor badminton courts, one full-size indoor basketball court, a dance studio and changing facilities with lockers.

== Sixth form ==
The school has a sixth form of about 325 pupils, both from the lower school and pupils who have moved from other schools. There is a sixth form block. The sixth form is a part of the Herschel Consortium.

== School links ==
Herschel Grammar School is part of the Schelwood Trust: an educational trust comprising Beechwood School and Herschel Grammar School.

Herschel Grammar School was a founding member-school of the Herschel Consortium - a co-operation of the sixth forms of Herschel Grammar School, The Westgate School and Baylis Court School, all of which are within the same district of Slough.

== Notable former pupils ==
- Gareth Unwin, Film Producer, The King's Speech
- Iain Lee, broadcaster
- Brian McDermott, footballer and manager of Reading FC.
- Ryan Bird, footballer
- Anthony Bryan Hayward, British businessman and former CEO of the oil and energy company BP.
