= Beechwoods =

Nature reserve in the United Kingdom

Coordinates: 52.167°N 0.17°E

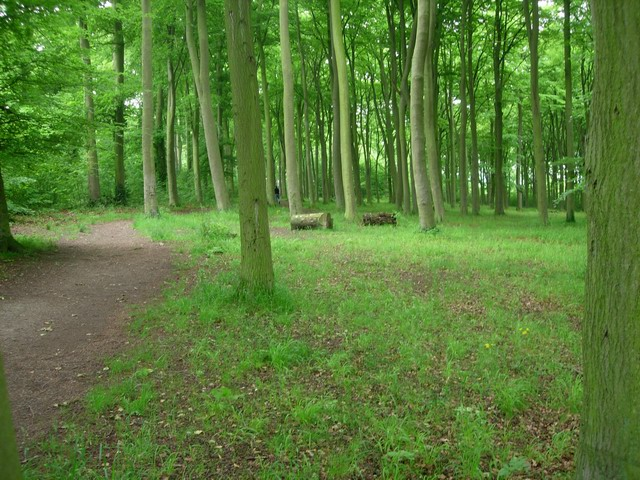
- Interactive map of Beechwoods
- Type: Local Nature Reserve
- Location: Cambridge
- OS grid: TL 485 545
- Area: 9.8 hectares (24 acres)
- Manager: Wildlife Trust for Bedfordshire, Cambridgeshire and Northamptonshire

Beechwoods is a 9.8 hectare Local Nature Reserve in Great Shelford, Cambridgeshire, south-east of Cambridge, England. It is owned by County Farms and managed by the Wildlife Trust for Bedfordshire, Cambridgeshire and Northamptonshire.

Beeches were planted on chalky farmland in the 1840s, and medieval plough terraces are still visible. Birds include green and great spotted woodpeckers, and nuthatches.

There is access from Worts' Causeway.
