= Beechwood Cemetery (disambiguation) =

Beechwood Cemetery is the national cemetery of Canada in Ottawa.

Beechwood Cemetery or Beechwoods Cemetery may also refer to:

- Beechwood Cemetery (Durham, North Carolina)
- Beechwoods Cemetery (New Rochelle, New York)
- Beechwoods Cemetery (Washington Township, Pennsylvania)
