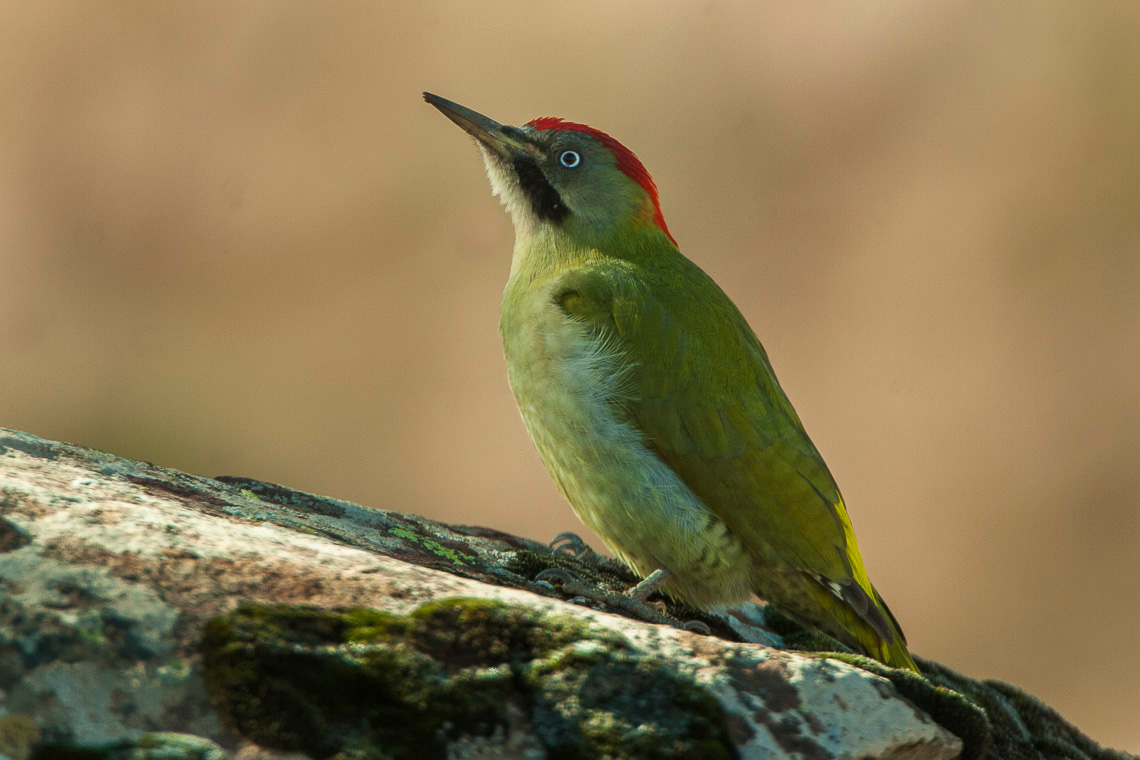
- male

Conservation status
- Least Concern (IUCN 3.1)

Scientific classification
- Kingdom: Animalia
- Phylum: Chordata
- Class: Aves
- Order: Piciformes
- Family: Picidae
- Genus: Picus
- Species: P. vaillantii

Binomial name
- Picus vaillantii (Malherbe, 1847)

= Levaillant's woodpecker =

Species of bird

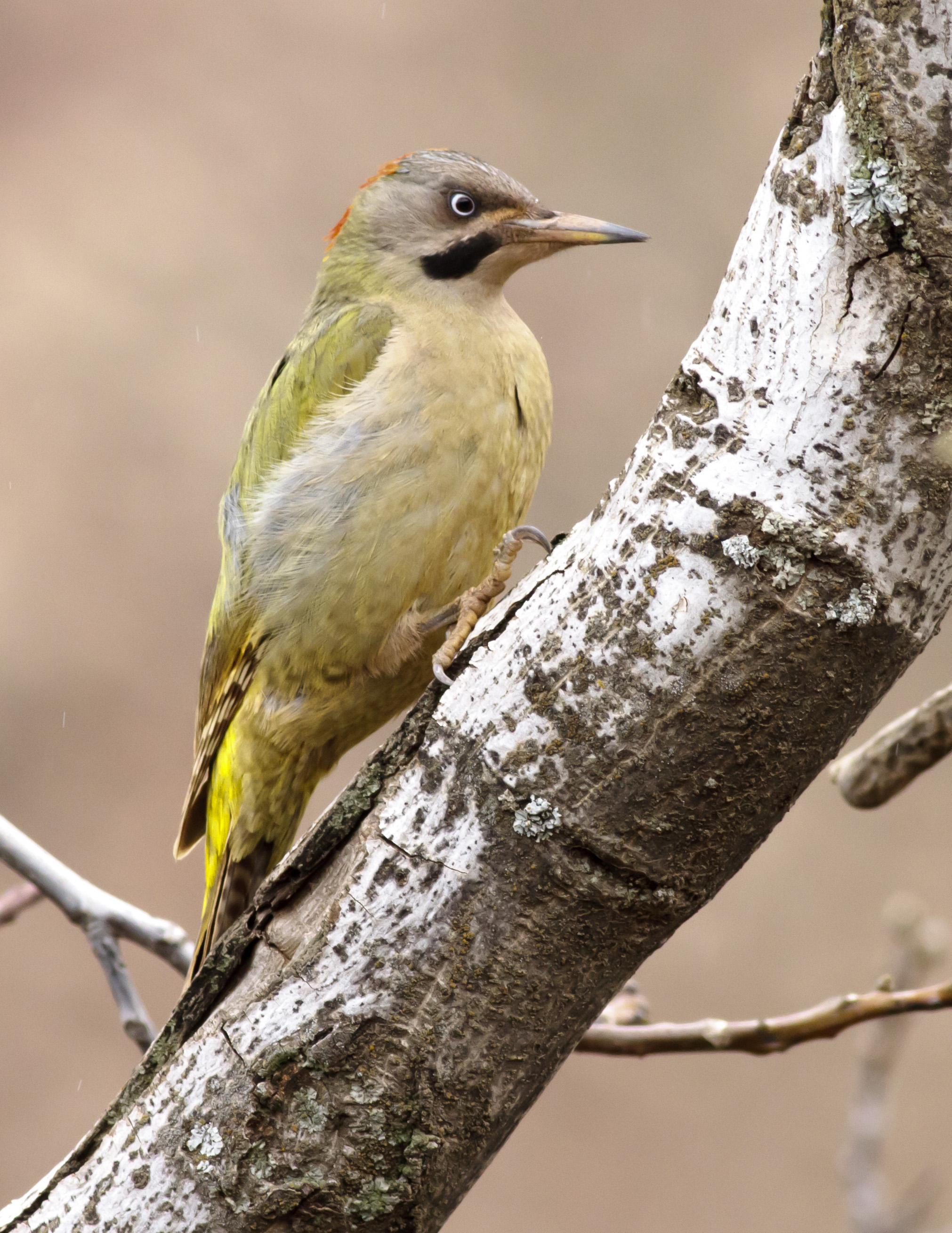
Levaillant's Woodpecker in the Ourika Valley, Morocco

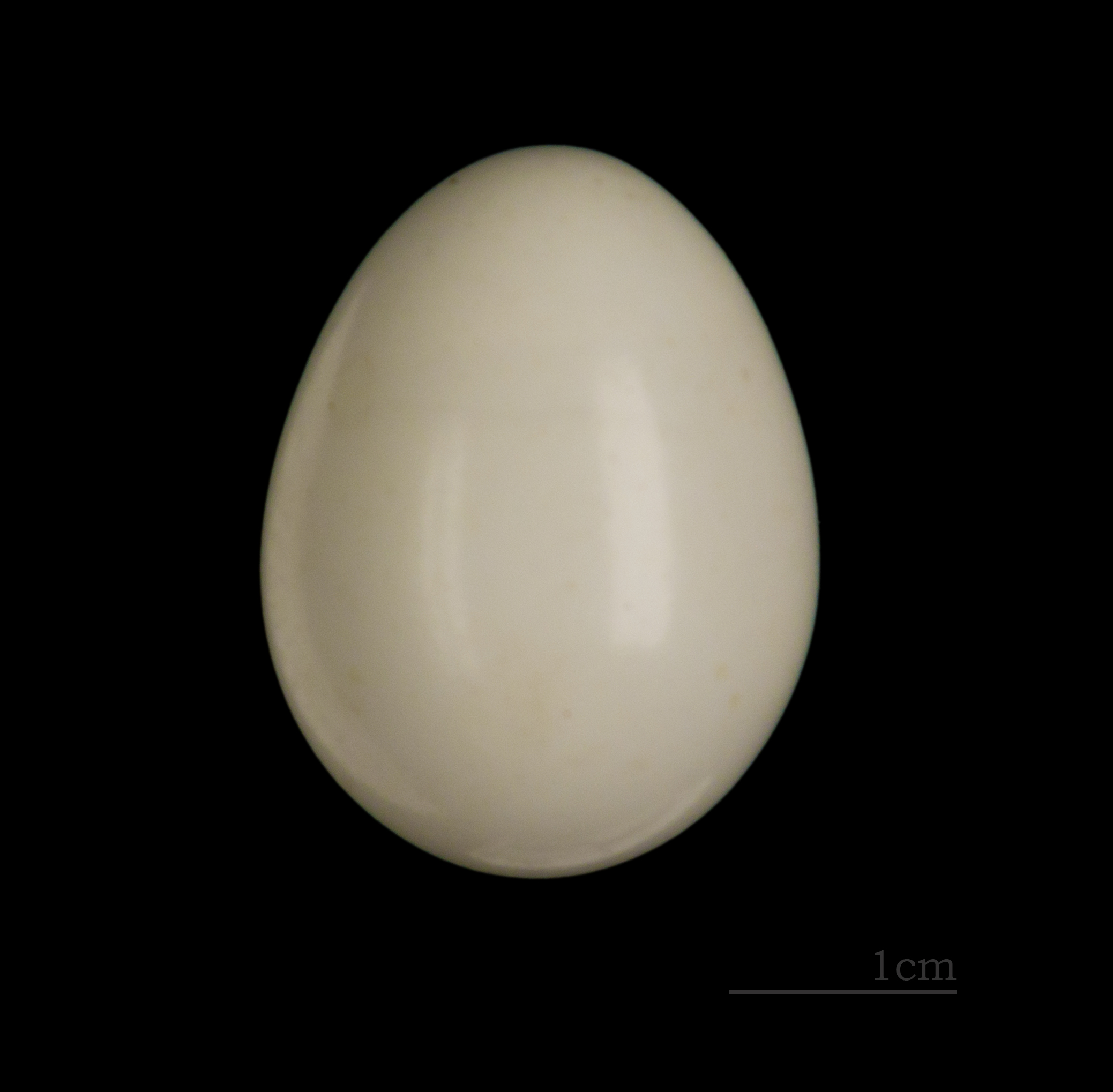
Egg of Picus vaillantii MHNT

Levaillant's woodpecker (Picus vaillantii) or Levaillant's green woodpecker, is a large northwest African member of the woodpecker family Picidae.

== Taxonomy ==
Levaillant's woodpecker is sometimes considered a subspecies of the European green woodpecker. It is monotypic, with no subspecies.

This species was named in honour of the French explorer, collector and ornithologist, François Le Vaillant.

== Distribution and habitat ==
Levaillant's woodpecker is found in the Atlas Mountains in the three Maghreb countries Morocco, Algeria, and Tunisia, in northwest Africa. It breeds in mountain forests up to the treeline at around 2000 metres.

== Description ==
Levaillant's woodpecker is 30–33 cm in length with a 45–51 cm wingspan. It is very similar to the European green woodpecker P. viridis and the Iberian green woodpecker P. sharpei (especially females). Both Levaillant's woodpecker and the Iberian Green woodpecker were formerly considered subspecies of P. viridis.

Levaillant's woodpecker is dark green above and yellowish green below, with a crimson nape. The black moustache has a pale border above. The rump is chrome yellow and the outer webs of the primaries are barred black and white. The bill and feet are slate grey.

Sexes are similar except that the male has a crimson crown, whereas the female's crown is grey. Like P. sharpei, both sexes lack the black on the lores and around the eye shown by most forms of the green woodpecker.

The call is a loud ringing laugh, plue, plue, plue, very like the green woodpecker's yaffle, but perhaps slightly faster.

== Behaviour ==
This woodpecker's insect food, mainly ants, is captured by a rapid outward flick of the long tongue, and gummed to its tip by sticky saliva. Though a large and heavy bird it has an easy, bounding flight. The nest is a hole in a tree, and 4-8 glossy white eggs are laid on wood chips.
