= Khalsa Aid =

Charitable organization

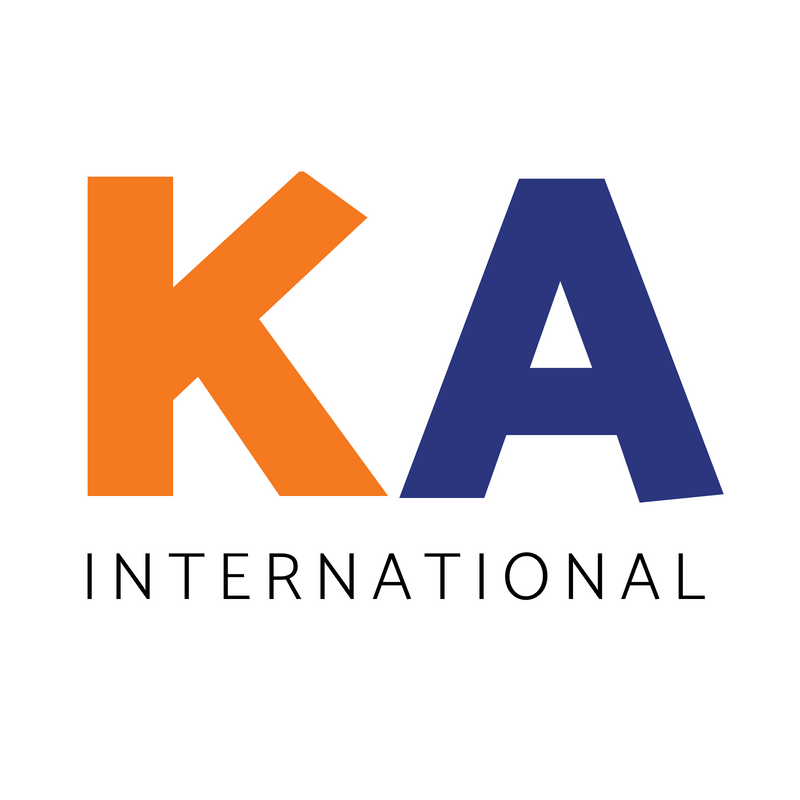
- Founded: 1999
- Founder: Ravi Singh
- Type: Charity
- Registration no.: 1163294
- Location: Berkshire
- Region served: Worldwide
- Services: Charitable services
- Website: www.khalsaaid.org

Khalsa Aid, founded in 2000, is a UK based international non profit humanitarian organization providing support to victims of natural and man made disasters around the world. The organization has been acknowledged for providing relief during 2016 London floods, in war-affected Syria in 2015, setting up refugee camps for Rohingyas on Bangladesh-Myanmar border in 2017, helping in rebuilding Kerala after 2018 floods, and feeding NHS workers in the UK and Khalsa Aid Provides Ration Kits, Essentials To Afghan Students Studying In Punjab and the poor in India during the COVID-19 pandemic.

== Key people ==
- Ravi Singh (CEO & Founder)
- Jindi Singh (Canada Director)
- Omar Singh (USA Director)
- Bal Sandhu (General Secretary)
- Sukhvinder Kaur Dhanjal (Trustee)
- Rajpal Singh Wilkhu (Trustee)
