= Langley Hall Primary Academy =

Location
- Station Road; Langley, Berkshire, SL3 8GW; England; 51.5042°N 0.5443°W

Information
- Type: Free school
- Motto: Ad Vitam Paramus (We are preparing for life)
- Established: 2011
- Department for Education URN: 136951 Tables
- Ofsted: Reports
- Head of School: Sally Eaton
- Gender: Mixed
- Age: 4 to 11
- Enrolment: 728
- Website: http://lhpa.co.uk/

Langley Hall Primary Academy is a Free School founded at Langley, Berkshire in 2011. It was established in a Grade II listed building under the coalition government's Free Schools initiative.

== History ==
=== The building ===
Langley Hall, at the centre of the village, is a Grade II listed building. The oldest parts of the present building date from the 17th century, but the façade was added in the 18th century.

In the early 20th century the Hall housed a preparatory school for boys and was known as Langley Place. In 1915 it was taken over by the Actors' Orphanage, which moved to Chertsey in 1938. During World War II it served as a Group Headquarters of RAF Bomber Command.

After the war the Hall was used by the Road Research Laboratory. Then in the 1970s it stood derelict for some years and was damaged by fire before serving a variety of purposes. In 1988 it became the home of Langley College, which formed part of East Berkshire College from 1992.

=== The school ===
A need had been identified for 300 new primary school places in Slough by September 2011 and in October 2010 it was announced that these were on track, although the timetable was tight. Mrs Sally Eaton, Educational Director of The Childcare Company, was confident that a scheme for a Free School, which she and her husband Chris had proposed, could meet the DfE's targets. In March 2011 Langley Hall was identified as the site and it was announced that Mrs Jane Sculpher, who had had more than ten years' experience in the field, had been appointed as Head. There would be 225 pupils in the second year and 67 jobs would be created, 30 of them in the first year. There was a plan to create six of the 14 proposed classrooms during the summer.

The business plan was signed off by the DfE in April 2011. It would now be possible to appoint staff. In August 2011 it was announced that the scheme was on course and there would be 182 places available in September. Sally Eaton would be Education Director and Chris Eaton would be Finance Manager. The couple had had 25 years' experience in local independent schools and nurseries.

The school opened as Langley Hall Primary Academy in September 2011 with 182 pupils aged between 4 and 11. Seven classrooms were in fact ready and there were two reception classes, as well as classes for other years. There was a waiting list of 62. A total of 25 staff had been appointed.

In November 2011 the school was officially opened by Sir Christopher Ball.
