= Beechwood House =

Beechwood House may refer to:

- Beechwood House, Highgate, London, England
- Beechwood House, Newport, Wales
- Beechwood House, Edinburgh, Scotland, former home of Alexander Asher
