= The Beachwood Reporter =

- Website type: News / Criticism
- Owner: The Beachwood Media Company
- Creator: Steve Rhodes
- Website: beachwoodreporter.com

The Beachwood Reporter was a web publication based in Chicago, Illinois, United States that focused on cultural criticism and critiques of Chicago's news outlets. It was launched on February 27, 2006. The publication shared the Society of Professional Journalists 2008 Sigma Delta Chi Award for online investigative reporting by an independent media outlet.

The Beachwood Reporter's most regularly updated feature is "The Papers," a column updated five days a week in which founder and editor Steve Rhodes comments on the coverage in local media outlets, especially the Chicago Tribune (one of Rhodes' former employers) and the Chicago Sun-Times. It currently dominates the site's main page. On Saturdays, "The Weekend Desk Report," a humorous roundup of the week's news, runs on the main page.

The site's other sections are: music, television, politics, sports, books, and people, places and things. So far, the site has avoided traditional reporting and straight-up reviews in favor of quirky but a\serious angles.

Early in its run, the Reporter attracted attention from media professionals in Chicago and beyond. Chicago Tribune blogger/columnists Steve Johnson and Eric Zorn, The Chicago Reader media critic Michael Miner and Reader blogger Harold Henderson have all name-checked the site, and media blogger Jim Romenesko linked to it from his Poynter Institute media news page.

Before starting the Reporter, Rhodes was a reporter for Chicago magazine and wrote "Press Box," a media column on the magazine's web site. Before that, he worked for Newsweek and the Chicago Tribune.
