= Baylis Court School =

Location
- Gloucester Avenue; Slough, Berkshire, SL1 3AH; England; 51°31′31″N 0°36′29″W

Information
- Type: Academy
- Motto: Inspiring leaders of tomorrow.
- Established: 1971
- Local authority: Slough
- Department for Education URN: 137259 Tables
- Ofsted: Reports
- Headteacher: Christine MacInnes
- Gender: Girls
- Age: 11 to 18
- Enrolment: 891
- Colours: Baylis blue, gold, white
- Website: www.bayliscourt.slough.sch.uk

Baylis Court School is a girls' secondary school with academy status in Slough, Berkshire, England, for students aged 11–18. It is the only single-sex non-selective school in Slough, and has a sixth form which was part of the Herschel Consortium.

== History and operations ==
The school was built in 1971 and converted into an academy in 2011.

After its 2004 inspection of Baylis Court School, the Office for Standards in Education, Children's Services and Skills reported:

[the school is] a good and effective school; it provides a good quality of education for its pupils.

After a Section 5 inspection on 15 October 2007, the school was rated as 'Outstanding' and, indeed, received this rating in all but two of the 26 criteria that are measured against this standard (i.e. the 1-4 Ofsted criteria).

Ofsted's 2004 report also states: The school population is made up of a very rich cultural mix and comprises:

- Asian or Asian British – Pakistani (57.7%)
- White – British (13.7%)
- Asian or Asian British – Indian (12%)
- Black or Black British – Caribbean (3.7%)
- Mixed – White and Asian (2.3%)
- Asian or Asian British – other (2%)
- Black or Black British – African (1.6%)
- Mixed – any other (1.5%)
- Mixed – White and Black Caribbean (1.5%)

The school was awarded specialist Arts College status in February 2007.

Baylis Court School is a school for girls aged 11–19.
