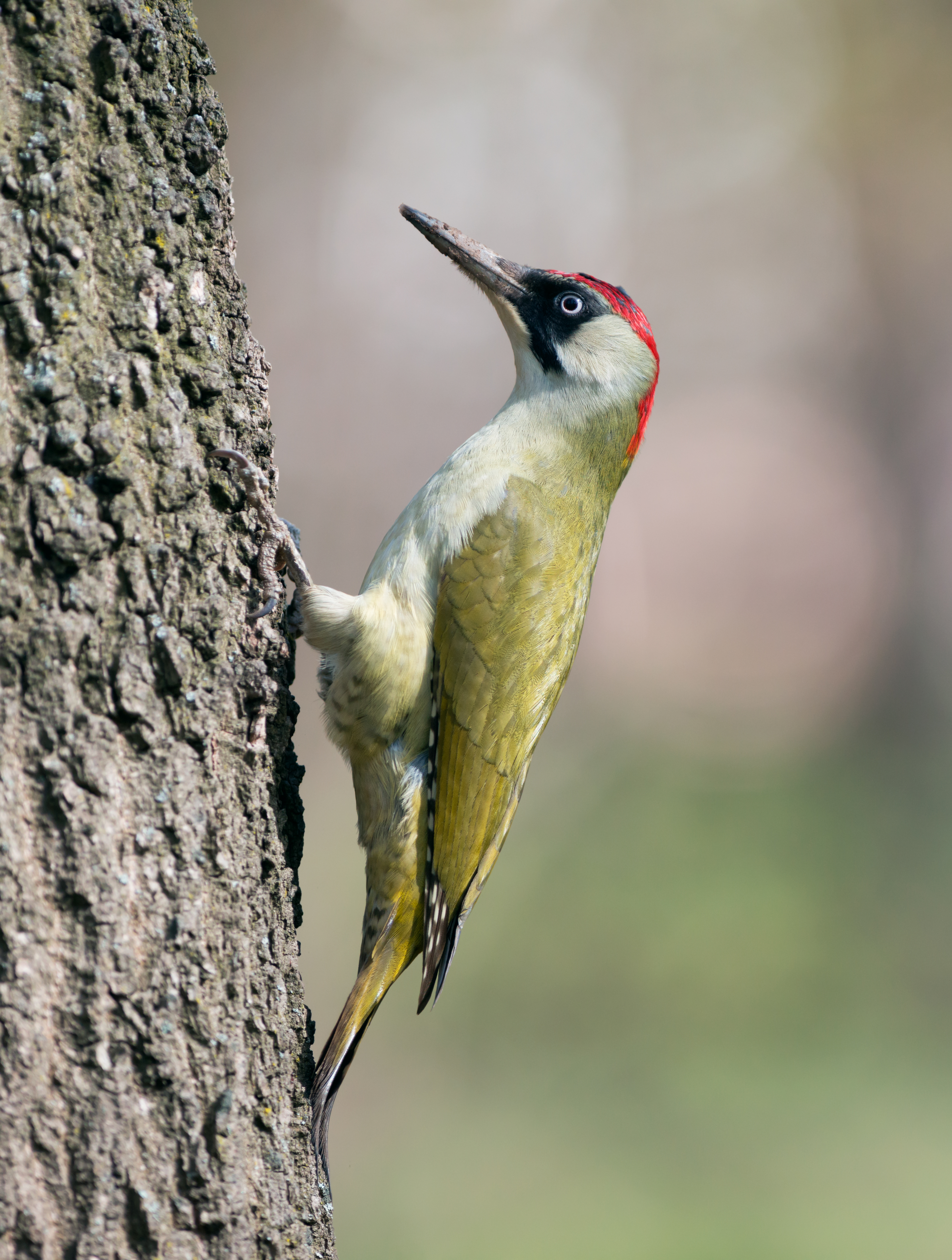
- Female, in Ukraine

Conservation status
- Least Concern (IUCN 3.1)

Scientific classification
- Kingdom: Animalia
- Phylum: Chordata
- Class: Aves
- Order: Piciformes
- Family: Picidae
- Genus: Picus
- Species: P. viridis

Binomial name
- Picus viridis Linnaeus, 1758
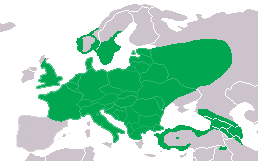
- Range

Synonyms
- Gecinus viridis

Audio
- Yaffle call, in England

= Eurasian green woodpecker =

Species of bird

The Eurasian green woodpecker (Picus viridis), also known as the yaffle and sometimes called a nickle, is a large green woodpecker with a bright red crown and a black moustache. Males have a red centre to the moustache stripe which is absent in females. It is resident across much of Europe and the western Palearctic but in Spain and Portugal it is replaced by the similar Iberian green woodpecker (Picus sharpei).

The Eurasian green woodpecker spends much of its time feeding on ants on the ground and does not often 'drum' on trees like other woodpecker species. Though its vivid green and red plumage is particularly striking, it is a shy bird, and is more often heard than seen, drawing attention with its loud calls. A nest hole is excavated in a tree; four to six eggs are laid which hatch after 19–20 days.

== Taxonomy ==
The Eurasian green woodpecker was formally described by the Swedish naturalist Carl Linnaeus in 1758 in the tenth edition of his Systema Naturae under its current binomial name Picus viridis. The type locality is Sweden. The scientific name is derived from the Latin picus, meaning "woodpecker", and viridis meaning "green". It is member of the order Piciformes and the woodpecker family Picidae.

=== Subspecies ===
There are three subspecies, with subtle and mostly clinal differences between them.

- P. v. viridis Linnaeus, 1758, which breeds in Europe south to France (except south Roussillon where it is replaced by the Iberian green woodpecker), the Alps, Croatia, Slovenia and Romania
- P. v. karelini von Brandt, JF, 1841, which breeds in Italy, south-east Europe south from North Macedonia, Montenegro, Serbia, Bulgaria, Asia Minor, northern Iran and south-west Turkmenistan. It has duller green upperparts, cheeks and underparts than viridis
- P. v. innominatus (Zarudny & Loudon, 1905), which breeds in south-west and southern Iran, is like karelini but with nearly white cheeks, throat and chest and more defined barring on the tail.

The Iberian green woodpecker (Picus sharpei) and Levaillant's woodpecker (Picus vaillantii) were formerly considered as subspecies of the Eurasian green woodpecker. They are now treated as separate species based on the results of two molecular phylogenetic studies published in 2011.

== Distribution and habitat ==
More than 75% of the range of the Eurasian green woodpecker is in Europe, where it is absent from some northern and eastern parts and from Ireland, Greenland and the Macaronesian Islands, but otherwise distributed widely. Over half of the European population is thought to be in France and Germany, with substantial numbers also in United Kingdom, Sweden, Russia, Croatia, Romania and Bulgaria. It also occurs in western Asia.

The Eurasian green woodpecker has a large range and an Estimated Global Extent of Occurrence of between 1 million to 10 million square kilometres, and a population in the region of 920,000 to 2.9 million birds. Populations appear to be stable, so the species is considered of Least Concern. The species is highly sedentary and individuals rarely move more than around 500 m between breeding seasons.

A combination of old deciduous trees for nesting, and nearby feeding grounds with plenty of ants, is essential. This is usually found in semi-open landscapes with small woodlands, hedges, scattered old trees, edges of forests and floodplain forests. Suitable habitats for foraging include grassland, heaths, plantations, orchards and lawns.

== Description ==
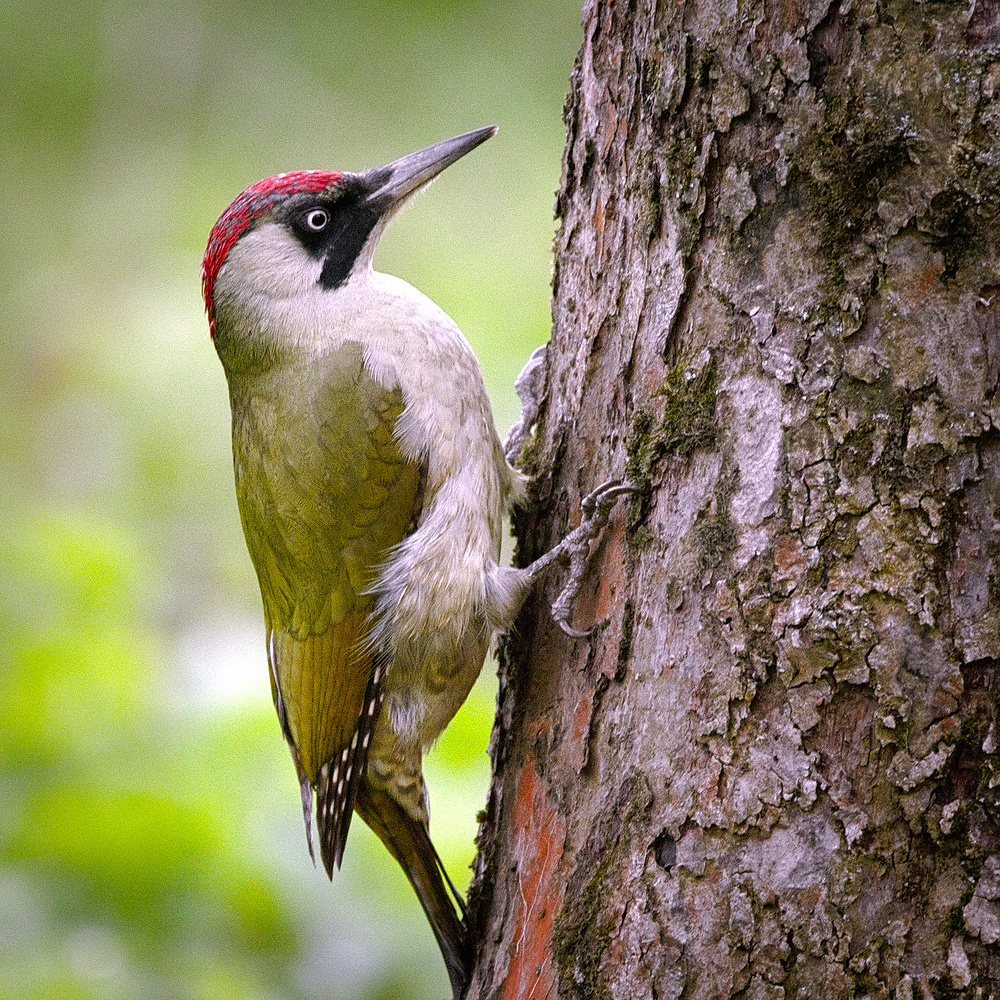
Female

Male

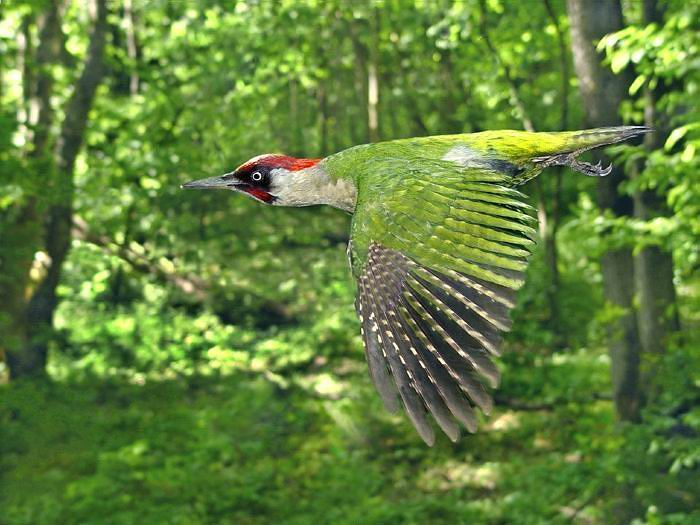
Male, in flight

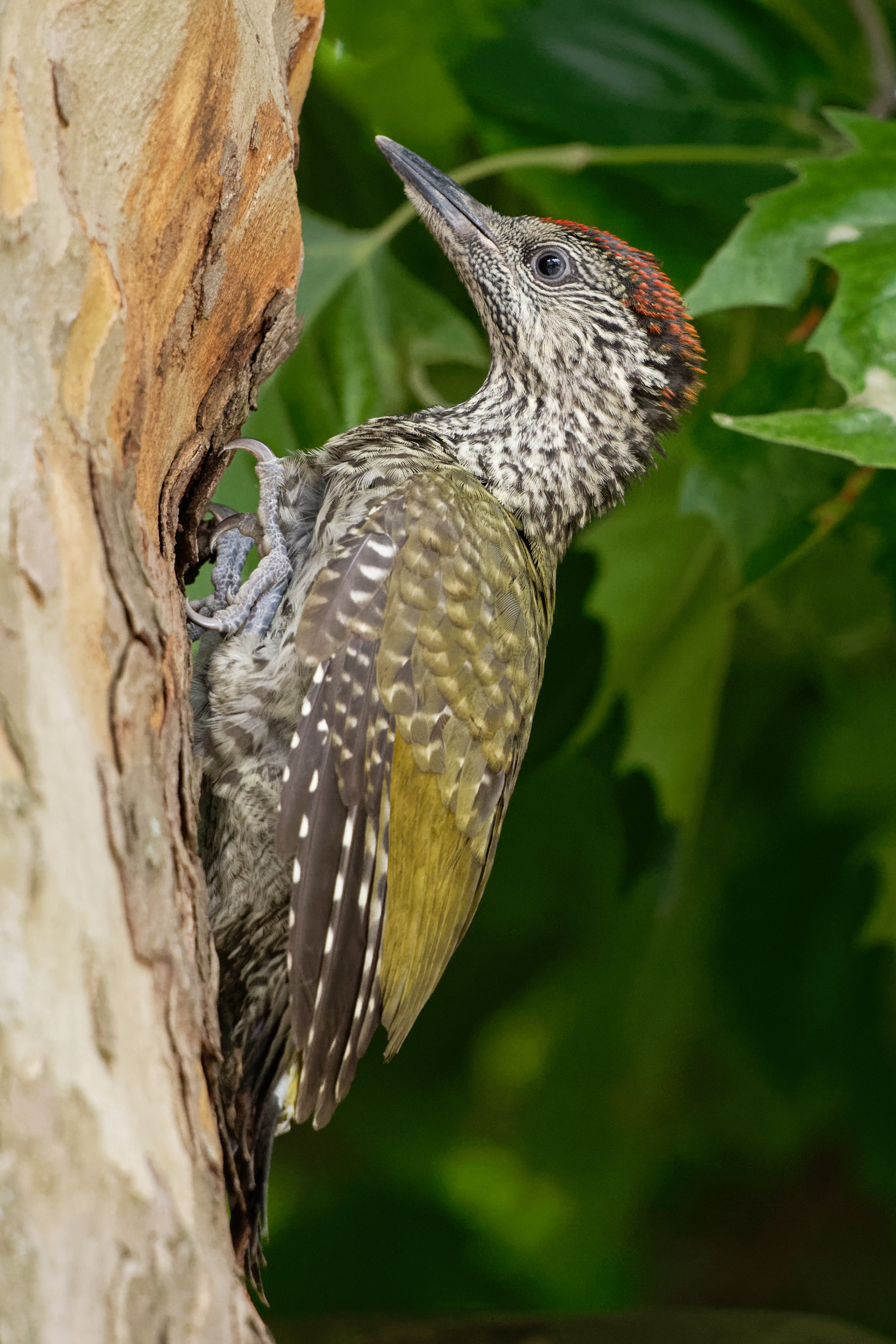
Juvenile

The Eurasian green woodpecker measures 30–36 cm (12–14 in) in length with a 45–51 cm (18–20 in) wingspan. Both sexes are green above and pale yellowish green below, with yellow rump and red crown and nape; the moustachial stripe has a red centre in the male but is solid black in the female. The lores and around the white eye are black in both male and female, except in the Iberian race P. v. subsp. sharpei, in which it is dark grey and males have only a lower black border to the moustache. Juveniles are spotty and streaked all over; the moustache is dark initially, though juvenile males can show some red feathers by early June or usually by July or August.

Moult takes place between June and November with the first flight feathers being lost around the time the young fledge. Juveniles moult quickly after fledging and gain their adult plumage between August and November.

Although the Eurasian green woodpecker is shy and wary, it usually draws attention with its loud calls known as yaffling. It 'drums' rarely (a soft, fast roll), but often gives a noisy kyü-kyü-kyück while flying. The song is a loud series of 10–18 'klü' sounds which gets slightly faster towards the end and falls slightly in pitch. The female makes a thinner pü-pü-pü-pü-pü-pü-pü. The flight is undulating, with 3–4 wingbeats followed by a short glide when the wings are held by the body.

It can be distinguished from the similar, but smaller, grey-headed woodpecker by its yellowish, not grey, underparts, and the black lores and facial 'mask'. In Europe, its green upperparts and yellow rump can lead to confusion with the grey-headed woodpecker or possibly the female golden oriole, though the latter is smaller and more slender with narrower wings and longer tail. The closely related, very similar Levaillant's woodpecker occurs only in north-west Africa.

== Behaviour ==
=== Breeding ===
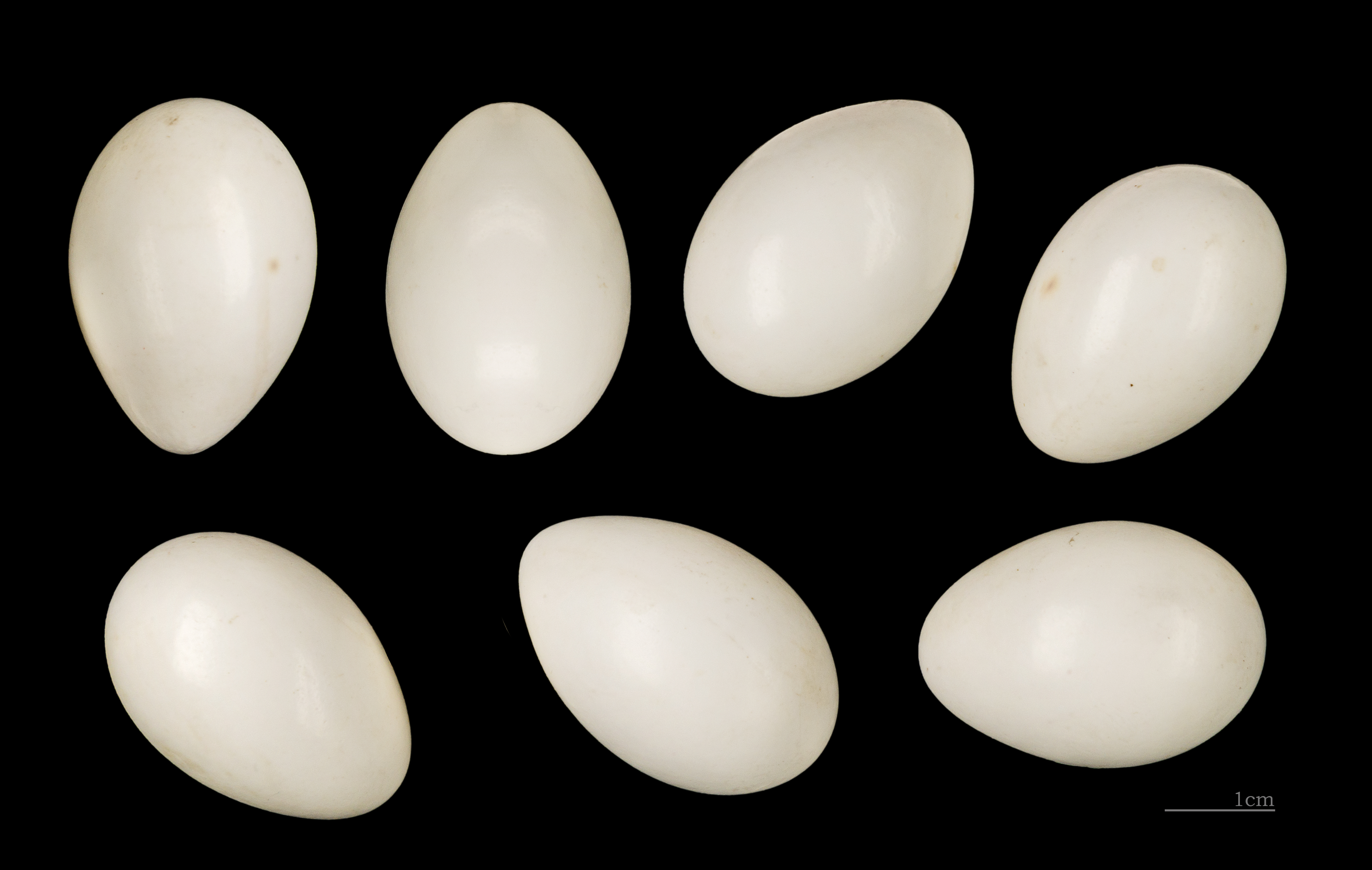
P. viridis eggs, MHNT

The nesting hole is larger but similar to those of the other woodpeckers. It may be a few feet above the ground or at the top of a tall tree; oaks, beeches, willows and fruit trees are the preferred nest trees in western and central Europe, and aspens in the north. The hole may be excavated in sound or rotten wood, with an entrance hole of 60 mm × 75 mm (2.4 in × 3.0 in). The cavity inside may be 150 mm wide and up to 40 cm (16 in) deep and the work is performed mostly by the male over 15–30 days. Some tree holes are used for breeding for more than 10 years, but not necessarily by the same pair.

There is a single brood of four to six white eggs, measuring 31 mm × 23 mm (1.22 in × 0.91 in) and weighing 8.9 g (0.31 oz) each, of which 7% is shell. After the last egg is laid, they are incubated for 19–20 days by both parents taking shifts of between 1.5 and 2.5 hours. The chicks are naked and altricial at hatching and fledge after 21–24 days.

=== Food and feeding ===
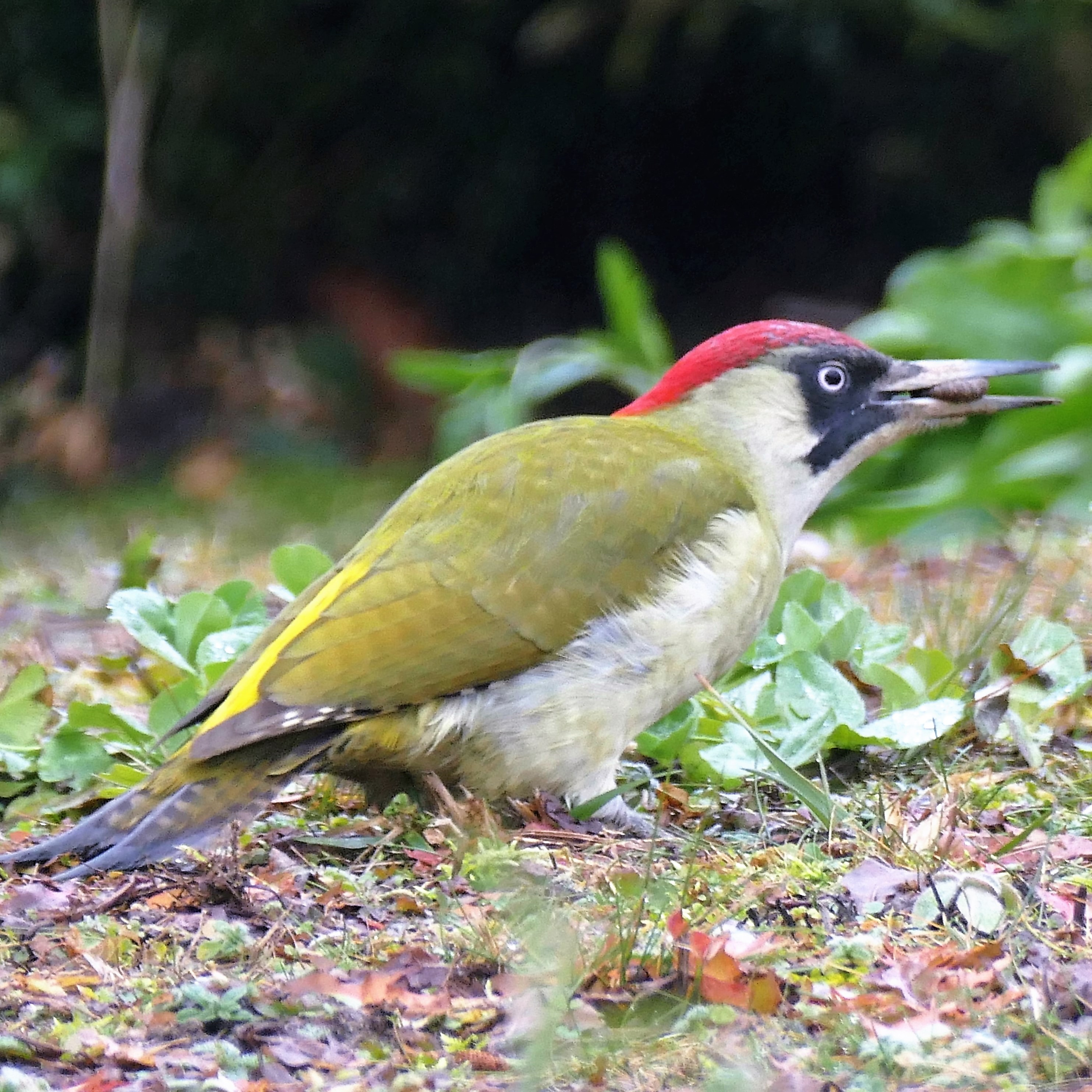
Female feeding, in Switzerland

The main food of the Eurasian green woodpecker is ants of the genera Lasius and Formica for which it spends much of its time foraging on the ground, though other insects and small reptiles are also taken occasionally. The bird's distinctive, elongated, cylindrical droppings often consist entirely of ant remains. At ant nests, it probes into the ground and licks up adult ants and their larvae. They have tongues that wrap to the back of their head.

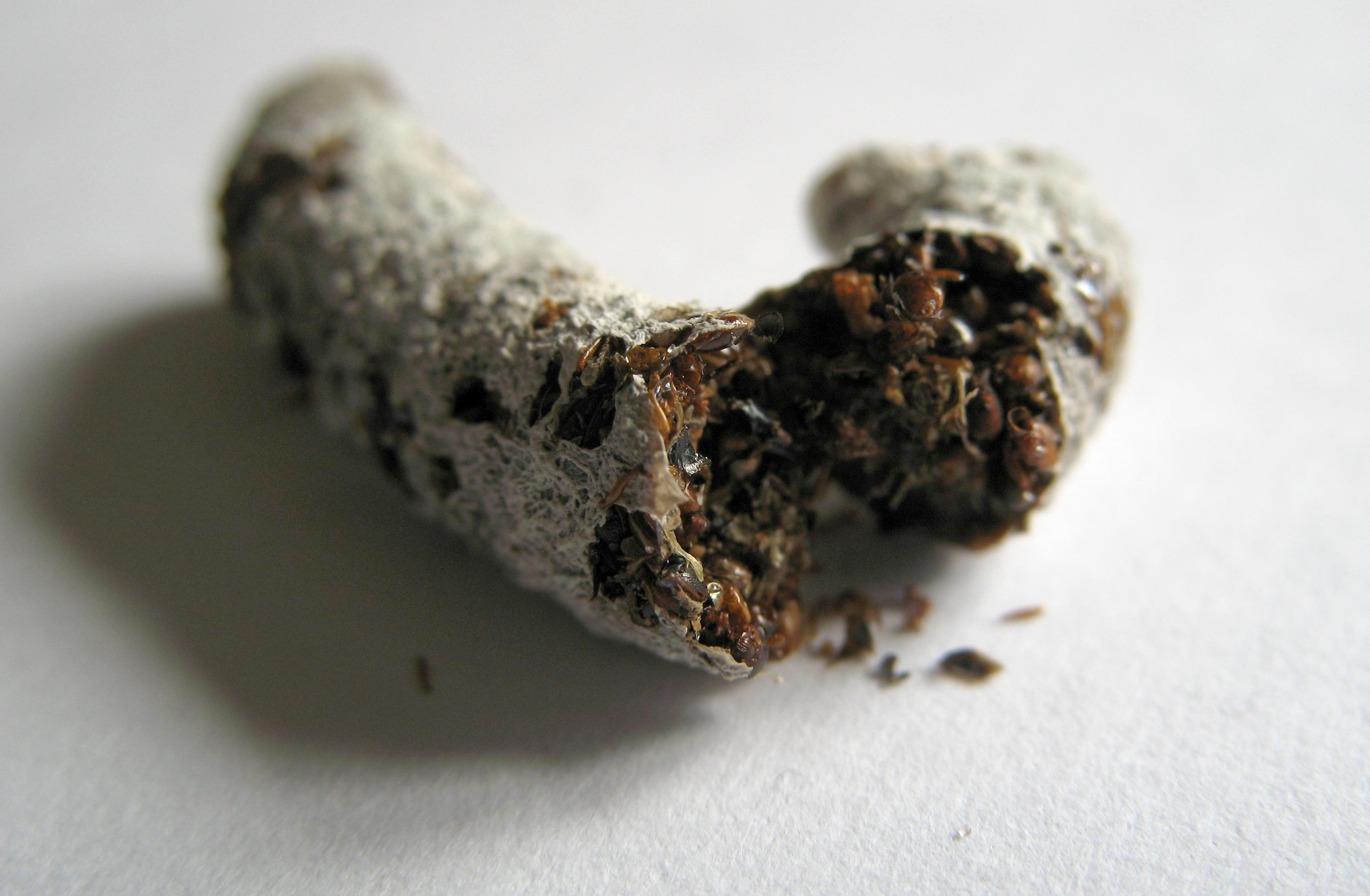
Dropping opened to show ant remains

A study of a nest in Romania found that 10 species of ant were fed to the chicks. During the first 10 days, the young received an average of 15 g (0.53 oz) each, from days 10–20, 39.5 g (1.39 oz), and from day 20, 49.3 g (1.74 oz). The seven chicks consumed an estimated 1.5 million ants and pupae before leaving the nest.

The beak is relatively weak and used for pecking in soft wood only. In common with other woodpecker species, the green woodpecker's tongue is long (10 cm) and has to be curled around its skull. It lacks the barbs of the Dendrocopos woodpeckers and black woodpecker (Dryocopus martius), but is made sticky by secretions from the enlarged salivary glands. Heavy, prolonged snow cover makes feeding difficult for the green woodpecker and can result in high mortality, from which it may take ten years for the population to recover. Ant nests can be located under the snow; one bird was observed to dig 85 cm to reach a nest.

== In culture ==
'Professor Yaffle', the wooden bookend character in the 1974 children's animation series Bagpuss, was based loosely upon the green woodpecker. 'Yaffle' was among many English folk names for the Eurasian green woodpecker relating to its laughing call; others include laughing Betsey, yaffingale, yappingale and Jack Eikle. Other names, including rain-bird, weather cock and wet bird, suggest its supposed ability to bring on rain. The species has been the subject of postage stamps from several countries. The Eurasian green woodpecker is associated with Woodpecker Cider, an image of the bird is used on the merchandise. The woodpecker was the totem of the Italic tribe of the Picentes, and features of the coat of arms and flag of the Italian region of the Marches.
