= Beechwood Park, Nova Scotia =

Beechwood Park
- Neighbourhood
- Location within Nova Scotia
- Country: Canada
- Province: Nova Scotia
- Municipality: Halifax
- Community: Halifax
- Municipal District: District 10 (Halifax-Bedford Basin West)

Area
  - Total: 75 ha (190 acres)
- Postal code: B3A
- Area code: 782, 902

Beechwood Park is a neighbourhood within the urban area of Municipality of Halifax, Nova Scotia, Canada.

== Geography ==
Beechwood Park is located within the urban area of Halifax--more specifically, between the communities of Fairview, and Rockingham. The landmass of Beechwood Park is fairly compact at 75 hectares (0.75 km^{2}).

== Demographics ==
Although Beechwood Park is a well-established neighbourhood within the urban area of Halifax, there are no demographic estimates for the neighbourhood.

== Transportation ==
The Bedford Highway goes through community, and connects Beechwood Park to Fairview to the south, and Rockingham to the north. Bayview Road connects to Lacewood Drive, which will connect the traveller to the community of Clayton Park. Several transit routes traverse its boundaries.

Halifax Transit Routes

- Route 39 (Flamingo)
- Route 90 (Larry Uteck)
- Route 91 (Hemlock Ravine)
- Route 93 (Bedford Highway)
- Route 196 (Basinview Express)
