= Beechwoods Cemetery (Washington Township, Pennsylvania) =

- Interactive map of Beechwoods Cemetery

Details
- Location: Falls Creek, Jefferson County, Pennsylvania
- Country: United States
- Coordinates: 41.1804°N 78.8627°W
- Find a Grave: Beechwoods Cemetery

Beechwoods Cemetery in Washington Township, Pennsylvania is a cemetery in Falls Creek, Jefferson County, Pennsylvania.

== History ==
In 1915, civic leaders in Jefferson County, recommended that a new monument be erected at Beechwoods Cemetery to honor deceased soldiers from Washington Township. Planners estimated that the memorial would cost approximately $5,000, and sent inquiries to surviving family members of the soldiers to solicit their input regarding the monument's design.

The cemetery has been an annual participant, since 2015, in the Wreaths Across America program, which places wreaths on the graves of more than one million veterans of the United States military each year during the month of December.

== Notable burials ==
Among those who have been buried at Beechwoods Cemetery are civic leaders and former members of the United States military, including veterans of World War II and the Korean War.

- James Bond (1793–1861): A son of Major William Bond, Sr. (1767–1863) and the father of William Bond (1823–1910), James Bond emigrated to America with his father in 1811. Shortly afterward, James Bond fought for the United States in War of 1812. He and his family then settled, in 1832, in the Beechwoods of Jefferson County, Pennsylvania, where he (James Bond) became a justice of the peace.
- Major William Bond, Sr. (1767–1836): A grandson of Lord Bond, Maj. William Bond, Sr. was a former soldier in the English army. He emigrated to America with his son, James, in 1811, and in 1832, settled with his family in the Beechwoods of Jefferson County, Pennsylvania.
- William Bond (1823–1910): A native of Adams County, Pennsylvania, William Bond was a grandson of Major William Bond, Sr. (1767–1863), son of War of 1812 veteran and Jefferson County, Pennsylvania justice of the peace James Bond (1793–1861), and a civic leader in Jefferson County.
- William J. Crawford (1928–2014): Washington Township supervisor and veteran who served with the U.S. Army in Panama
- Robert Hemphill Longwell (1871–1930): A member of the Pennsylvania House of Representatives (elected in 1906 and 1908).
