= Lynch Hill Enterprise Academy =

Coordinates: 51°31′14.9″N 0°35′20.5″W

Location
- Stoke Road; Slough, Berkshire, SL2 5AY; England

Information
- Type: Free school
- Established: 2014
- Department for Education URN: 146820 Tables
- Ofsted: Reports
- Headteacher: Chris Thomas
- Gender: Coeducational
- Age: 11 to 18
- Colours: green blue and red
- Website: http://www.lhea.org.uk/

Lynch Hill Enterprise Academy (LHEA) is a secondary school with academy status which opened in September 2014. The school is located in Slough, in the English county of Berkshire. The school is non-selective and has an intake of 160-180 students per year at key stages 3 and 4.

The curriculum and learning opportunities at LHEA allow students to combine academic and vocational learning in purpose-built facilities.

== History ==
On 13 July 2012, Lynch Hill School Primary Academy bid to open a new enterprise academy free school, to extend their education provision into Key Stage 3 and 4. It was one of the 102 successful free school bids announced by the coalition Government. The new academy officially opened in September 2014, with the primary academy as a sponsor.

Both schools formed the basis of a multi-academy trust: The Learning Alliance Academy Trust. In 2019, the Learning Alliance Academy Trust became part of the Slough and East Berkshire Church of England Multi-Academy Trust (SEBMAT).
