= Beechwood (Beales, Virginia) =

Historic house in Virginia, United States

- U.S. National Register of Historic Places
- Virginia Landmarks Register
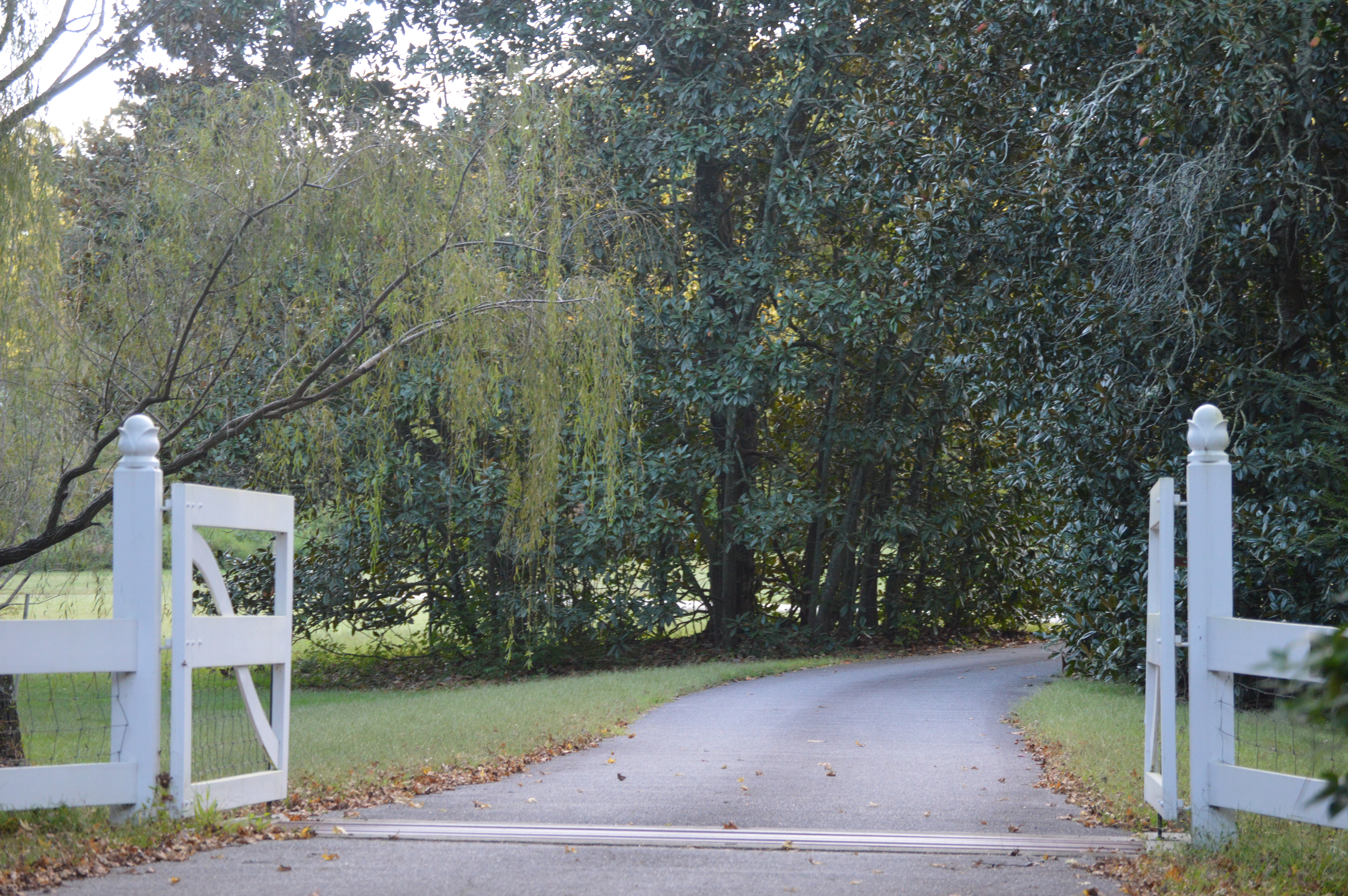
- Entrance to the property

- Location within Virginia Location within the United States
- Location: NE of Courtland on VA 643, near Beales, Virginia
- Coordinates: 36°45′10″N 77°0′6″W
- Area: 9 acres (3.6 ha)
- Built: c. 1790
- NRHP reference No.: 79003088
- VLR No.: 087-0002

Significant dates
- Added to NRHP: February 1, 1979
- Designated VLR: September 19, 1978

Beechwood, also known as Jericho, is a historic home located near Beales, Southampton County, Virginia. The frame dwelling was built in several sections between about 1790 and late-19th centuries. It consists of a two-story, three-bay main block dated to about 1790 with a side-hall, double pile plan. It has a small one-bay wing at the east end; a two-bay, one-cell wing at the west; and a two-story, two-room ell off the west wing. The front facade features a one-story pedimented porch with a dentil cornice and full entablature supported on Tuscan order columns.

It was listed on the National Register of Historic Places in 1979.
