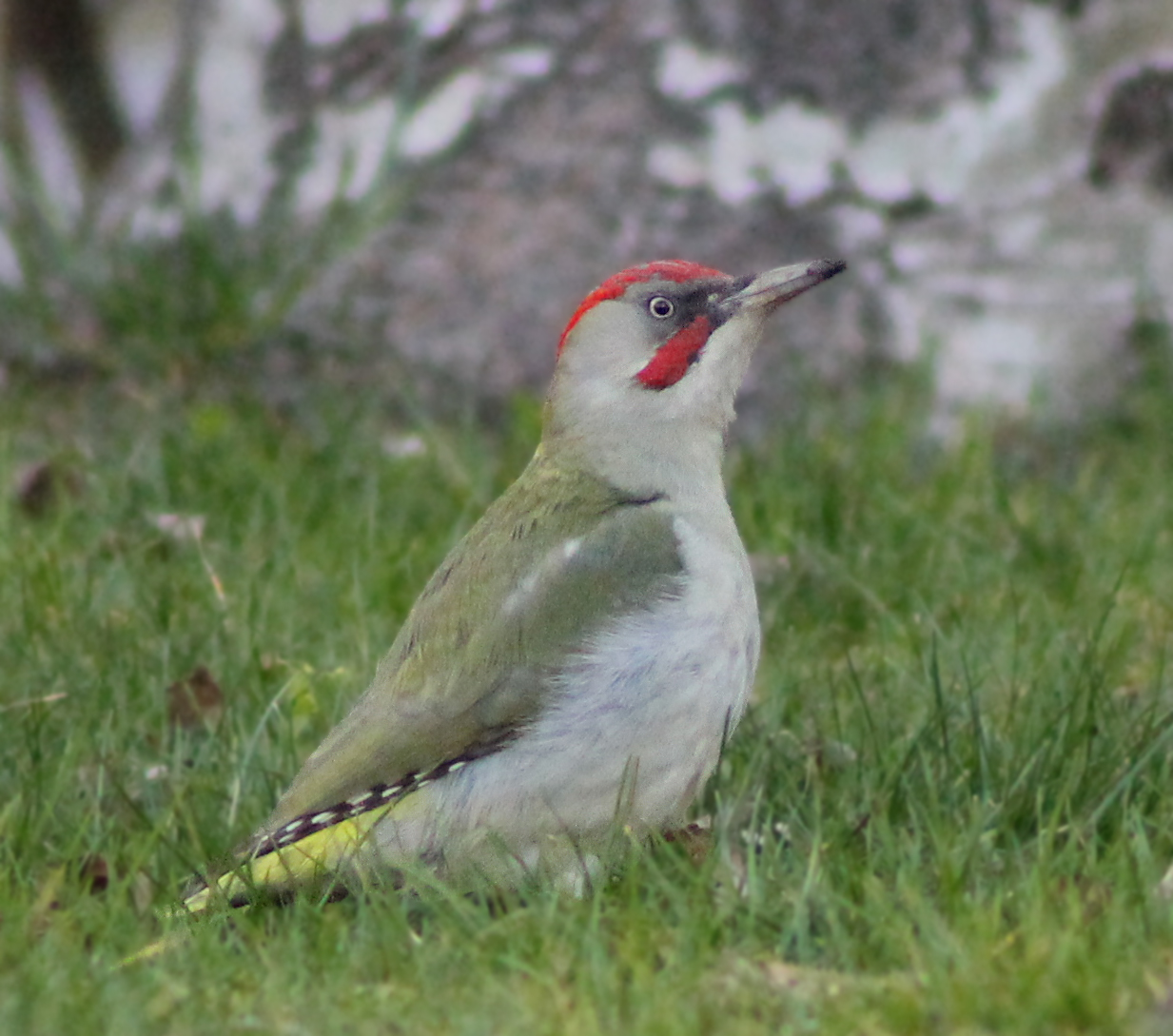
- Male
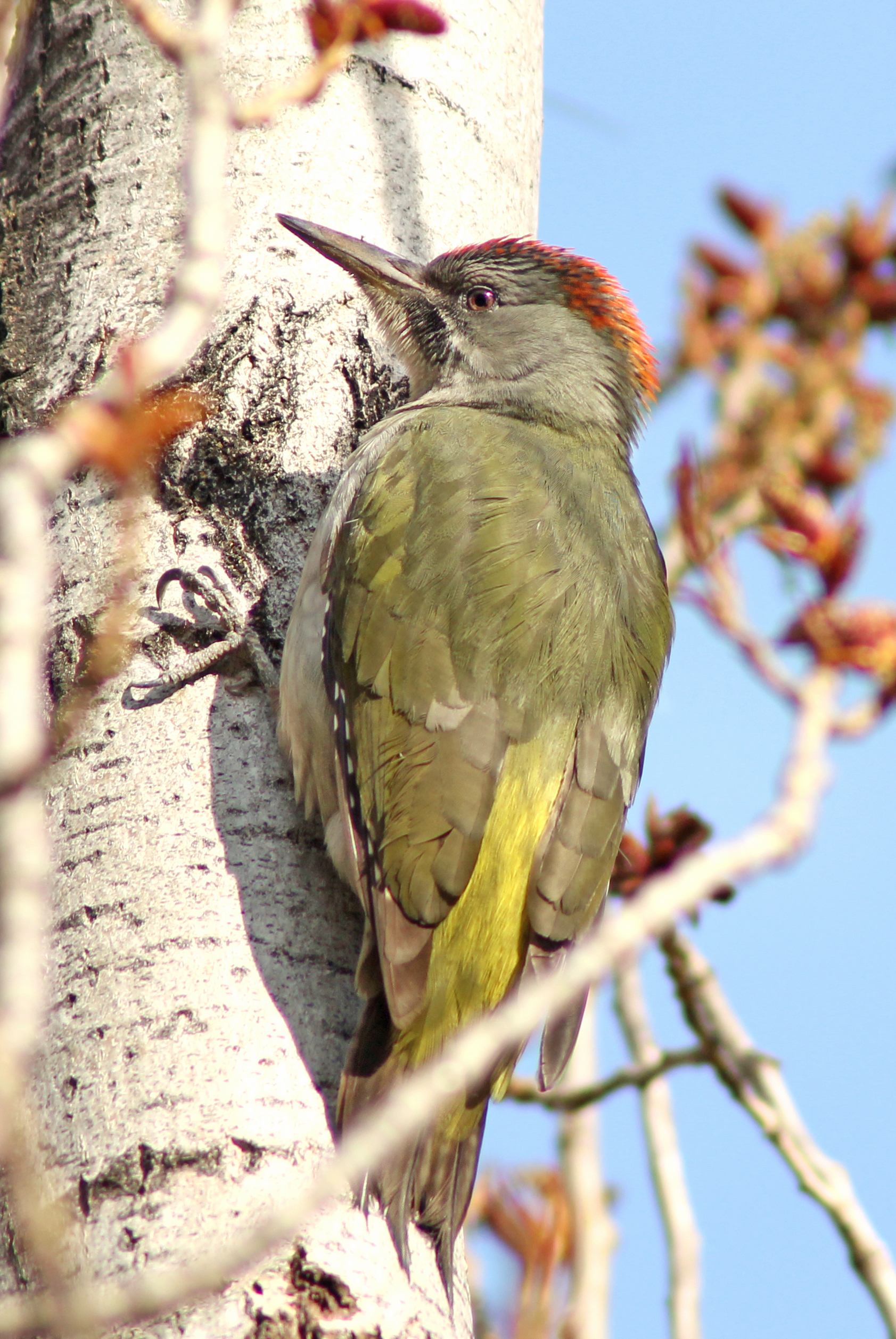
- Female

Conservation status
- Least Concern (IUCN 3.1)

Scientific classification
- Kingdom: Animalia
- Phylum: Chordata
- Class: Aves
- Order: Piciformes
- Family: Picidae
- Genus: Picus
- Species: P. sharpei

Binomial name
- Picus sharpei (Saunders, 1872)
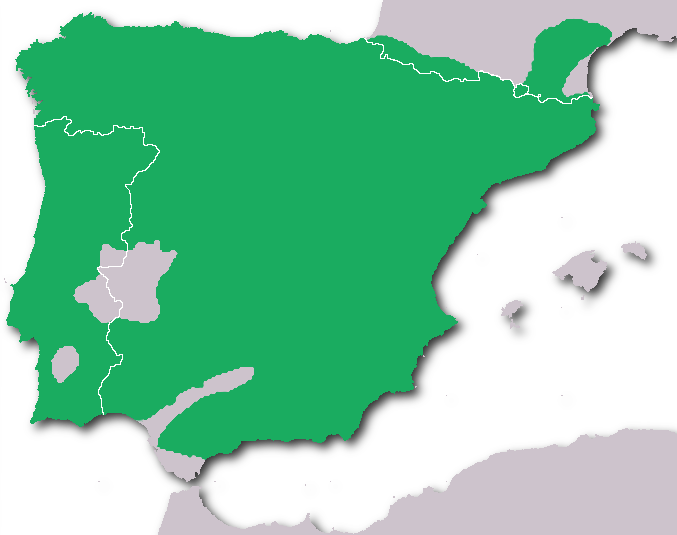
- Range

Synonyms
- Picus viridis sharpei; Gecinus sharpei

= Iberian green woodpecker =

Species of bird

The Iberian green woodpecker (Picus sharpei) is a medium-sized woodpecker endemic to the Iberian peninsula. It was formerly considered as a subspecies of the European green woodpecker but differs in having little black on the head and a dusky rather than a black ring around each eye. Its sound has been described as sibilant, or hiss-like.

== Taxonomy ==
The Iberian green woodpecker was described by Howard Saunders in 1872 and given the binomial name Gecinus sharpei. He chose the specific epithet to honour his friend, the English zoologist Richard Bowdler Sharpe, who he credited with first distinguishing it from the European green woodpecker (Picus viridis) and Levaillant's woodpecker (Picus vaillantii). The Iberian green woodpecker was usually treated as a subspecies of the European green woodpecker but two separate studies published in 2011 found that there were significant differences in both mitochondrial and nuclear DNA sequences between the two populations. Based on these results the Iberian green woodpecker is now considered as a separate species. The species is monotypic: no subspecies are recognised.
