= Beechwood, Wyoming County, West Virginia =

Community in West Virginia, US

Beechwood
- Unincorporated community
- Location within the state of West Virginia Beechwood (the United States)
- Coordinates: 37°34′56″N 81°19′28″W
- Country: United States
- State: West Virginia
- County: Wyoming
- Time zone: UTC-5 (Eastern (EST))
  - Summer (DST): UTC-4 (EDT)
- GNIS feature ID: 1553840

Beechwood is an unincorporated community in Wyoming County, West Virginia, United States.
