= Slough and Eton Church of England Business and Enterprise College =

Coordinates: 51.5042°N 0.6043°W

Slough Eton Church of England Business and Enterprise College

Location
- Ragstone Road; Chalvey; Slough, Berkshire, SL1 2PU; England

Information
- Type: Academy
- Religious affiliation: Church of England
- Established: October 1940
- Department for Education URN: 137287 Tables
- Ofsted: Reports
- Headteacher: Peter Collins
- Gender: Co-educational
- Age: 11 to 19
- Enrolment: 1,014 (2012)
- Houses: Ali; Parks; King; Winton; Angelou; Seacole
- Colour: Black
- Website: http://www.slougheton.com/

Slough and Eton Church of England Business and Enterprise College is a co-educational secondary academy in Chalvey, Slough, Berkshire for students aged 11–19, with a sixth form of around 83 students studying for A levels.

Since the May 2011 Ofsted report, the school has been described as "outstanding". (The previous report in 2008 described the school as "a good school with some outstanding aspects.")

Since opening, the school has operated in a series of wooden and temporary buildings. Most of the site was destroyed in a fire in 1973 and the school rebuilt over the next 20 years. A further rebuilding project was started in the summer of 2006 and was scheduled to be completed in October 2008 at a cost of £10 million. This includes a twenty four classroom teaching block, sports facilities, school hall, sixth form centre, science labs, students support centre, administration offices, restaurant and performing arts areas.
