= Wexham School =

Coordinates: 51.5268°N 0.5728°W

Wexham Secondary School

Location
- Norway Drive; Wexham; Slough, Berkshire, SL2 5QP; England

Information
- Type: Community school
- Motto: Opportunity, Inspiration, Success
- Established: September 1987
- Local authority: Slough, Berkshire
- Department for Education URN: 110078 Tables
- Ofsted: Reports
- Principal: Lawrence Smith
- Gender: Co-educational
- Age: 11 to 18
- Enrolment: 1200+
- Houses: Brunel, Seacole, Luther King, Mandela, Hadid, Gibson, Turing, Pankhurst
- Colour: (Blue)
- Website: http://www.wexhamschool.co.uk/

Wexham School is a co-educational community school in Wexham Court, Slough, Berkshire.

== Admissions ==
The school opened in 1987, and serves students aged 11–18, with a sixth form created in 2006.

In November 2017, the school was judged good in all categories by Ofsted and they said “the school’s work to promote pupils’ personal development and welfare is outstanding”.

In a recent inspection in 2023, the school was judged and continues to be a good school. Inspectors have said ‘ Wexham School is a friendly and highly inclusive school.
