= Beechwood, Wood County, West Virginia =

Unincorporated community in West Virginia, United States

Beechwood
- Unincorporated community
- Location within the state of West Virginia Beechwood (the United States)
- Coordinates: 39°17′20″N 81°32′45″W
- Country: United States
- State: West Virginia
- County: Wood
- Elevation: 617 ft (188 m)
- Time zone: UTC-5 (Eastern (EST))
  - Summer (DST): UTC-4 (EDT)
- GNIS ID: 1553841

Beechwood is an unincorporated community in Wood County, West Virginia, United States.
