= Beechwood School =

Coordinates: 51.5346°N 0.6204°W

Location
- Long Readings Lane; Britwell; Slough, Berkshire, SL2 1QE; England

Information
- Type: Academy
- Motto: Inspiring Success
- Established: 1961
- Local authority: Slough
- Trust: The Schelwood Trust
- Department for Education URN: 143327 Tables
- Ofsted: Reports
- Gender: Coeducational
- Age: 11 to 18
- Enrolment: 805
- Website: http://www.beechwood.slough.sch.uk/

Beechwood School is a coeducational secondary school and sixth form located in the Britwell area of Slough, Berkshire, England.

The school was established in 1982 when the former Haymill and Warren Field Secondary schools merged on the Warren Field site.

Ofsted in 2008 judged the school to be Good. In 2016 it was judged as Requires Improvement. Following that inspection the school converted to an academy.
